= 1960 NBA Finals =

1960 basketball championship series

Team	Coach	Wins
Boston Celtics	Red Auerbach	4
St. Louis Hawks	Ed Macauley	3
- Dates: March 27–April 9
- Hall of Famers: Celtics: Bob Cousy (1971); Bill Russell (1975); Bill Sharman (1976); Frank Ramsey (1982); Sam Jones (1984); Tom Heinsohn (1986 as player, 2015 as coach); K. C. Jones (1989); Hawks: Bob Pettit (1971); Cliff Hagan (1978); Slater Martin (1982; did not play); Clyde Lovellette (1988); Coaches: Red Auerbach (1969) (Note: Although Macauley was inducted to the Naismith Memorial Basketball Hall of Fame as a player in 1960, he has not been inducted as a coach.)
- Eastern finals: Celtics defeated Warriors, 4–2
- Western finals: Hawks defeated Lakers, 4–3

The 1960 NBA World Championship Series was the championship series of the 1960 NBA playoffs, which concluded the National Basketball Association 1959–60 season. The best-of-seven series was played between the Western Division champion St. Louis Hawks and the Eastern Division champion Boston Celtics. It was Boston's fourth trip to the NBA Finals and St. Louis' third. This was the fourth meeting between teams from Boston and St. Louis for a major professional sports championship.

The Celtics beat the Hawks 4–3. The Finals featured Hall of Famers Bill Russell, Bob Cousy, Tom Heinsohn, Bill Sharman, Frank Ramsey, Sam Jones, K.C. Jones, Coach Red Auerbach, Bob Pettit, Cliff Hagan, Slater Martin, Clyde Lovellette.

This was the last time the NBA Finals would be played in March.

== Series summary ==
Game	Date	Home team	Result	Road team
Game 1	March 27	Boston Celtics	140–122 (1–0)	St. Louis Hawks
Game 2	March 29	Boston Celtics	103–113 (1–1)	St. Louis Hawks
Game 3	April 2	St. Louis Hawks	86–102 (1–2)	Boston Celtics
Game 4	April 3	St. Louis Hawks	106–96 (2–2)	Boston Celtics
Game 5	April 5	Boston Celtics	127–102 (3–2)	St. Louis Hawks
Game 6	April 7	St. Louis Hawks	105–102 (3–3)	Boston Celtics
Game 7	April 9	Boston Celtics	122–103 (4–3)	St. Louis Hawks

Celtics win series 4–3

== Team rosters ==
=== Boston Celtics ===
1959–60 Boston Celtics roster
Players

Pos.	No.	Player	Height	Weight	DOB	From
PF	17	Gene Conley	6 ft 8 in (2.03 m)	225 lb (102 kg)	1930–11–10	Washington State
PG	14	Bob Cousy	6 ft 1 in (1.85 m)	175 lb (79 kg)	1928-08-09	Holy Cross
SF	20	Gene Guarilia	6 ft 5 in (1.96 m)	220 lb (100 kg)	1937-09-13	George Washington
PF	15, 20	Tom Heinsohn	6 ft 7 in (2.01 m)	218 lb (99 kg)	1934–08–26	Holy Cross
PG	25	K.C. Jones	6 ft 1 in (1.85 m)	200 lb (91 kg)	1932–05–25	San Francisco
SG	24	Sam Jones	6 ft 4 in (1.93 m)	198 lb (90 kg)	1933-06-24	North Carolina Central
SF	18	Jim Loscutoff	6 ft 5 in (1.96 m)	220 lb (100 kg)	1930–02–04	Oregon
SG	23	Frank Ramsey	6 ft 3 in (1.91 m)	190 lb (86 kg)	1931–07–13	Kentucky
C	16	John Richter	6 ft 9 in (2.06 m)	225 lb (102 kg)	1937-03-12	NC State
C	6	Bill Russell	6 ft 10 in (2.08 m)	215 lb (98 kg)	1934–02–12	San Francisco
SG	21	Bill Sharman	6 ft 1 in (1.85 m)	175 lb (79 kg)	1926–05–25	USC

Coaches
Head coach
- Red Auerbach

Legend
- (DP) Unsigned draft pick
- (FA) Free agent
- (S) Suspended
- Injured

Roster

=== St. Louis Hawks ===
1959–60 St. Louis Hawks roster
Players

Pos.	No.	Player	Height	Weight	DOB	From
SG	11	Al Ferrari	6 ft 4 in (1.93 m)	190 lb (86 kg)	1933–07–06	Michigan State
C	20	Bob Ferry	6 ft 8 in (2.03 m)	230 lb (104 kg)	1937–05–31	Saint Louis
C	13	Larry Foust	6 ft 9 in (2.06 m)	215 lb (98 kg)	1928–06–24	La Salle
SF	12	Dave Gambee	6 ft 6 in (1.98 m)	215 lb (98 kg)	1937–04–16	Oregon State
PG	17	Si Green	6 ft 2 in (1.88 m)	185 lb (84 kg)	1933–08–20	Duquesne
SF	16	Cliff Hagan	6 ft 4 in (1.93 m)	210 lb (95 kg)	1931–12–09	Kentucky
C	34	Clyde Lovellette	6 ft 9 in (2.06 m)	234 lb (106 kg)	1929–09–07	Kansas
PG	22	Slater Martin	5 ft 10 in (1.78 m)	170 lb (77 kg)	1925–10–22	Texas
SG	15	Johnny McCarthy	6 ft 1 in (1.85 m)	185 lb (84 kg)	1934–04–25	Canisius
PG	21	Jack McMahon	6 ft 1 in (1.85 m)	185 lb (84 kg)	1928–12–03	St. John's
PF	9	Bob Pettit	6 ft 9 in (2.06 m)	205 lb (93 kg)	1932–12–12	LSU
SG	12, 25	Dave Piontek	6 ft 6 in (1.98 m)	230 lb (104 kg)	1934–08–27	Xavier
SF	13	Cal Ramsey	6 ft 4 in (1.93 m)	200 lb (91 kg)	1937–07–13	NYU
C	19	Hub Reed	6 ft 9 in (2.06 m)	215 lb (98 kg)	1936–10–04	Oklahoma City
C	13	Chuck Share	6 ft 11 in (2.11 m)	235 lb (107 kg)	1927–03–14	Bowling Green

Coaches
Head coach
- Ed Macauley

Legend
- (DP) Unsigned draft pick
- (FA) Free agent
- (S) Suspended
- Injured

Roster

== Box scores ==
March 27

Boxscore

St. Louis Hawks 122, Boston Celtics 140
Scoring by quarter: 25–30, 26–46, 34–38, 37–26
Pts: Cliff Hagan 25; Rebs: Bob Pettit 17; Asts: Johnny McCarthy 6	Pts: Tom Heinsohn 24; Rebs: Bill Russell 19; Asts: Bob Cousy 12
Boston leads series, 1–0

Boston Garden, Boston, Massachusetts
Attendance: 10,002

March 29

Boxscore

St. Louis Hawks 113, Boston Celtics 103
Scoring by quarter: 25–21, 24–35, 34–23, 30–24
Pts: Bob Pettit 35; Rebs: Bob Pettit 22; Asts: Bob Pettit 7	Pts: Bill Sharman 30; Rebs: Bill Russell 40; Asts: Bob Cousy 8
Series tied, 1–1

Boston Garden, Boston, Massachusetts
Attendance: 13,909

- Bill Russell's 40 rebounds set a single-game Finals record for an individual player.

April 2

Boxscore

Boston Celtics 102, St. Louis Hawks 86
Scoring by quarter: 31–32, 23–23, 23–17, 25–14
Pts: Tom Heinsohn 30; Rebs: Bill Russell 19; Asts: Bob Cousy 13	Pts: Bob Pettit 23; Rebs: Bob Pettit 18; Asts: Green, Lovellette 6 each
Boston leads series, 2–1

Kiel Auditorium, St. Louis, Missouri
Attendance: 10,612
Referees: Sid Borgia, Arnie Heft

April 3

Boxscore

Boston Celtics 96, St. Louis Hawks 106
Scoring by quarter: 18–28, 21–22, 24–31, 33–25
Pts: Ramsey, Sharman 20 each Rebs: Bill Russell 19; Asts: Bob Cousy 4	Pts: Bob Pettit 32; Rebs: Bob Pettit 11; Asts: Johnny McCarthy 8
Series tied, 2–2

Kiel Auditorium, St. Louis, Missouri
Attendance: 10,612
Referees: Jim Duffy, Mendy Rudolph

April 5

Boxscore

St. Louis Hawks 102, Boston Celtics 127
Scoring by quarter: 26–34, 27–31, 25–30, 24–32
Pts: Cliff Hagan 28; Rebs: Cliff Hagan 12; Asts: Si Green 8	Pts: Tom Heinsohn 34; Rebs: Bill Russell 26; Asts: Bob Cousy 10
Boston leads series, 3–2

Boston Garden, Boston, Massachusetts
Attendance: 13,909

April 7

Boxscore

Boston Celtics 102, St. Louis Hawks 105
Scoring by quarter: 16–24, 36–30, 12–36, 38–15
Pts: Bill Russell 17; Rebs: Bill Russell 16; Asts: Bob Cousy 9	Pts: Cliff Hagan 36; Rebs: Clyde Lovellette 15; Asts: Johnny McCarthy 9
Series tied, 3–3

Kiel Auditorium, St. Louis, Missouri
Attendance: 10,612
Referees: Jim Duffy, Mendy Rudolph

April 9

Boxscore

St. Louis Hawks 103, Boston Celtics 122
Scoring by quarter: 30–29, 23–41, 25–26, 25–26
Pts: Bob Pettit 22; Rebs: Bob Pettit 14; Asts: Si Green 5	Pts: Frank Ramsey 24; Rebs: Bill Russell 35; Asts: Bob Cousy 14
Boston wins series, 4–3

Boston Garden, Boston, Massachusetts
Attendance: 13,909
