= 1959–60 Detroit Pistons season =

NBA team season

- Head coach: Red Rocha; Dick McGuire
- General manager: Nick Kerbawy
- Owner: Fred Zollner
- Arena: Detroit Olympia

Results
- Record: 30–45 (.400)
- Place: Division: 2nd (Western)
- Playoff finish: West Division Semifinals (eliminated 0–2)
- Stats at Basketball Reference

Local media
- Television: WJBK
- Radio: WXYZ

The 1959–60 Detroit Pistons season was the Detroit Pistons' 12th season in the NBA and third season in the city of Detroit. The team played at Olympia Stadium in Detroit.

The team finished with a 30-45 (.400) record, second in the Western Division, advancing to the playoffs, dropping the Western Conference semi-final 2–0 to the Minneapolis Lakers. The team was led guard Gene Shue (22.8 ppg, NBA All-Star) and center Walter Dukes (15.2 ppg, 13.4 rpg). The Pistons also featured rookie Bailey Howell who put up outstanding numbers (17.8 ppg, 10.5 rpg) on his way to a Hall of Fame career.

== Regular season ==
=== Season standings ===
Western Division	Wins	Losses	PCT	GB	Home	Road	Neutral	Division
x-St. Louis Hawks	46	29	.613	–	28–5	12–20	6–4	27–12
x-Detroit Pistons	30	45	.400	16	17–14	6–21	7–10	20–19
x-Minneapolis Lakers	25	50	.333	21	9–15	9–21	7–14	17–22
Cincinnati Royals	19	56	.253	27	9–22	2–20	8–14	14–25

x – clinched playoff spot

=== Game log ===
1959–60 Game log
#	Date	Opponent	Score	High points	Record
1	October 18	@ Minneapolis	W 106–105	Gene Shue (22)	1–0
2	October 24	@ Cincinnati	L 103–108	Bailey Howell (17)	1–1
3	October 28	Syracuse	W 117–102	Bailey Howell (22)	2–1
4	October 31	@ Philadelphia	L 112–120	Gene Shue (23)	2–2
5	November 4	New York	L 101–107	Bailey Howell (15)	2–3
6	November 6	@ Minneapolis	W 118–113 (2OT)	Gene Shue (22)	3–3
7	November 7	Minneapolis	L 111–113 (OT)	Gene Shue (28)	3–4
8	November 8	@ Syracuse	L 107–118	Earl Lloyd (19)	3–5
9	November 10	vs. Boston	L 109–128	Gene Shue (28)	3–6
10	November 11	Philadelphia	L 105–119	Walter Dukes (22)	3–7
11	November 12	vs. Minneapolis	W 107–93	Archie Dees (23)	4–7
12	November 14	Cincinnati	W 111–103	Bailey Howell (22)	5–7
13	November 15	@ New York	W 103–94	Gene Shue (26)	6–7
14	November 17	Boston	L 129–132 (2OT)	Gene Shue (35)	6–8
15	November 18	vs. Cincinnati	W 110–93	Bailey Howell (27)	7–8
16	November 20	@ Minneapolis	L 85–105	Chuck Noble (15)	7–9
17	November 21	@ St. Louis	W 109–107	Bailey Howell (27)	8–9
18	November 22	New York	W 115–104	Chuck Noble (26)	9–9
19	November 24	vs. Cincinnati	W 104–91	Gene Shue (43)	10–9
20	November 25	St. Louis	L 97–104	Gene Shue (22)	10–10
21	November 28	@ Boston	L 110–136	Bailey Howell (20)	10–11
22	December 4	Minneapolis	W 120–101	Chuck Noble (25)	11–11
23	December 5	@ New York	L 108–124	Gene Shue (20)	11–12
24	December 6	@ Philadelphia	L 116–118	Bailey Howell (25)	11–13
25	December 9	vs. Cincinnati	L 119–129	Gene Shue (26)	11–14
26	December 10	vs. St. Louis	L 111–129	Archie Dees (26)	11–15
27	December 13	New York	W 147–129	Walter Dukes (38)	12–15
28	December 16	St. Louis	L 106–107	Bailey Howell (33)	12–16
29	December 19	Syracuse	W 120–112	Gene Shue (32)	13–16
30	December 20	@ St. Louis	L 86–102	Walter Dukes (20)	13–17
31	December 22	Boston	L 104–136	Bailey Howell (25)	13–18
32	December 25	@ Cincinnati	L 103–121	Walter Dukes (19)	13–19
33	December 26	Minneapolis	W 108–105	Bailey Howell (25)	13–20
34	December 27	@ Minneapolis	L 109–119	Gene Shue (30)	13–21
35	December 30	vs. New York	L 109–124	Gene Shue (26)	13–22
36	January 1	St. Louis	W 119–107	Gene Shue (28)	14–22
37	January 2	@ St. Louis	L 113–114	Walter Dukes (27)	14–23
38	January 3	Cincinnati	W 114–112	Gene Shue (31)	15–23
39	January 5	@ New York	L 110–121	Gene Shue (23)	15–24
40	January 7	vs. Philadelphia	L 105–120	Earl Lloyd (20)	15–25
41	January 8	vs. Syracuse	L 107–118	Dukes, Howell (25)	15–26
42	January 9	Boston	L 103–126	Bailey Howell (19)	15–27
43	January 10	@ Syracuse	L 103–108	Gene Shue (26)	15–28
44	January 13	vs. New York	W 114–113	Gene Shue (29)	16–28
45	January 16	vs. Minneapolis	W 105–98	Howell, Shue (18)	17–28
46	January 17	Cincinnati	W 115–110	Bailey Howell (28)	18–28
47	January 23	Philadelphia	W 130–110	Dees, Shue (22)	19–28
48	January 25	vs. Philadelphia	L 117–127	Gene Shue (24)	19–29
49	January 26	vs. Syracuse	W 121–114	Gene Shue (31)	20–29
50	January 27	Syracuse	L 108–144	Bailey Howell (22)	20–30
51	January 29	@ St. Louis	L 125–130 (OT)	Bailey Howell (26)	20–31
52	January 30	St. Louis	W 117–107	Walter Dukes (26)	21–31
53	January 31	@ Boston	L 128–146	Gene Shue (22)	21–32
54	February 3	Cincinnati	W 117–105	Gene Shue (28)	22–32
55	February 4	@ Cincinnati	W 121–102	Chuck Noble (25)	23–32
56	February 6	Minneapolis	W 116–101	Archie Dees (27)	24–32
57	February 7	@ Minneapolis	L 102–104	Gene Shue (25)	24–33
58	February 9	Philadelphia	W 122–113	Gene Shue (30)	25–33
59	February 10	vs. Boston	L 121–153	Gene Shue (25)	25–34
60	February 12	vs. Cincinnati	L 101–133	Noble, Shue (16)	25–35
61	February 13	Minneapolis	L 117–123 (OT)	Gene Shue (34)	25–36
62	February 16	St. Louis	L 104–111	Gene Shue (31)	25–37
63	February 19	Boston	L 116–136	Chuck Noble (29)	25–38
64	February 20	@ Cincinnati	L 107–110	Gene Shue (26)	25–39
65	February 21	@ Syracuse	L 120–122	Gene Shue (39)	25–40
66	February 24	Syracuse	W 128–110	Gene Shue (37)	26–40
67	February 25	vs. Boston	L 107–121	Ed Conlin (27)	26–41
68	February 27	@ St. Louis	W 127–97	Archie Dees (25)	27–41
69	February 28	Philadelphia	L 111–113	Gene Shue (22)	27–42
70	March 1	vs. Cincinnati	W 108–106	Dick McGuire (22)	28–42
71	March 2	St. Louis	W 116–100	Bailey Howell (28)	29–42
72	March 3	@ Philadelphia	L 101–110	Gene Shue (23)	29–43
73	March 6	@ New York	L 112–120	Bailey Howell (22)	29–44
74	March 8	@ St. Louis	L 101–122	Gene Shue (18)	29–45
75	March 9	Minneapolis	W 117–116	Shellie McMillon (26)	30–45

== Playoffs ==
1960 playoff game log
Division Semifinals: 0–2 (home: 0–1; road: 0–1)

Game	Date	Team	Score	High points	Location	Series
1	March 12	Minneapolis	L 112–113	Bailey Howell (29)	Grosse Pointe South High School	0–1
2	March 13	@ Minneapolis	L 99–114	Gene Shue (27)	Minneapolis Armory	0–2

1960 schedule

== Awards and records ==
- Gene Shue, All-NBA First Team
