= Woody Sauldsberry =

American basketball player (1934–2007)

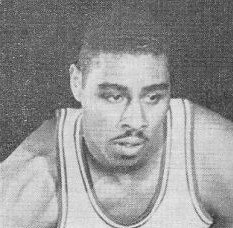

Personal information
- Born: July 11, 1934 Winnsboro, Louisiana, U.S.
- Died: September 3, 2007 (aged 73) Baltimore, Maryland, U.S.
- Listed height: 6 ft 7 in (2.01 m)
- Listed weight: 220 lb (100 kg)

Career information
- High school: Compton Union (Compton, California)
- College: Texas Southern (1953–1955)
- NBA draft: 1957: 8th round, 60th overall pick
- Drafted by: Philadelphia Warriors
- Playing career: 1955–1966
- Position: Power forward / center
- Number: 14, 21, 35, 18

Career history
- 1955–1957: Harlem Globetrotters
- 1957–1960: Philadelphia Warriors
- 1960–1961: St. Louis Hawks
- 1961–1963: Chicago Packers / Zephyrs
- 1963: St. Louis Hawks
- 1965: New Haven Elms
- 1965–1966: Boston Celtics

Career highlights
- NBA champion (1966); NBA All-Star (1959); NBA Rookie of the Year (1958)

Career NBA statistics
- Points: 4,930 (10.7 ppg)
- Rebounds: 3,618 (7.8 rpg)
- Assists: 498 (1.1 apg)
- Stats at NBA.com
- Stats at Basketball Reference

Woodrow Sauldsberry Jr. (July 11, 1934 – September 3, 2007) was an American basketball player. He was the NBA's Rookie of the Year in 1958 and in 1966 he won the NBA championship as a member of the Boston Celtics.

== Early life ==
Sauldsberry was born on July 11, 1934, in Winnsboro, Louisiana, and was raised in Los Angeles. He graduated from Compton Union High School (later Compton High School) in 1953.

Sauldsberry was a 6 ft 5 in (1.96 m) center on Compton's basketball team. Under coach Kenny Fagans, Compton's basketball team won the California Interscholastic Federation (CIF) championship in both the 1950–51 and 1951–52 seasons, including a 32-game winning streak over those two years. Sauldsberry started on the 1951–52 team. The 1952-53 Compton team, led by Sauldsberry, took the three-year winning streak to 53 games. Sauldsberry was the most valuable player in the Compton Tournament, during which the winning streak ended. Compton then won another 17 straight (including four CIF playoff wins) before losing in the 1953 CIF championship game. He was All-Conference two years and All-City as a senior.

== College ==
Sauldsberry received a basketball scholarship to attend Texas Southern University. He was an NAIA All-American in 1955, with the 1955 Texas Southern team winning the black college (HBCU) title (NAIA District 29) over three-time champion Tennessee State, 103–100. The 6 ft 6 in (1.98 m) Sauldsberry played a central role in the victory, scoring 31 points, and was the tournament's leading scorer. Texas Southern then went on to reach the semifinals of the NAIA tournament. Sauldsberry left college after two years to join the Harlem Globetrotters.

== Professional career ==
=== Harlem Globetrotters ===
After Sauldsberry's sophomore year in college, Abe Saperstein of the Harlem Globetrotters pursued Sauldsberry to join the Globetrotters. Sauldsberry left Texas Southern and became part of the Globetrotters for two seasons (1955–57), traveling the country and the world. He had to wait those two years before he was considered eligible for the NBA draft. He played the role of "straight man" on the Globetrotters, and had lost interest in continuing with them after two years.

=== NBA and Eastern League ===
==== Philadelphia Warriors ====
In 1957, the now 6 ft 7 in (2.01 m) and 220 pound (99.8 kg) Sauldsberry was drafted by the Philadelphia Warriors in the eighth round with the 60th overall pick. After his first season, he was named the league's Rookie of the Year — the second African American ever to win the award and becoming the lowest overall draft pick ever to win the award, a record he still holds. On January 2, 1959, he scored a career high 41 points against the Syracuse Nationals. The same month, he was selected to play in the NBA All-Star Game. His last season with the Warriors (1959–60) coincided with Wilt Chamberlain's rookie season on the team. In three years with the Warriors, he averaged 10.7 points and 7.8 rebounds in nearly 28 minutes per game.

==== St. Louis Hawks, Chicago Zephyrs/Packers, Eastern League, and Boston Celtics ====
In October 1960, the Warriors traded Sauldsberry and Ernie Beck to the St. Louis Hawks for Ed Conlin and cash. Sauldsberry was backup to future Naismith Memorial Basketball Hall of Fame forward Bob Pettit, averaging 7.5 points and 7.1 rebounds in 21.6 minutes per game. The Hawks reached the NBA Finals, losing four games to one against the Boston Celtics. Sauldsberry played in all five games, averaging 10 points, 9.2 rebounds and 2.6 assists in 32.4 minutes per game.

On October 17, 1961, while still with the Hawks, Sauldsberry was among seven players—the others being Bill Russell, Al Butler, Sam Jones, K. C. Jones, Tom Sanders, and Cleo Hill— to refuse to play in an exhibition basketball game over alleged discrimination. The five members of the Boston Celtics said that a hotel coffee shop denied them service, after which they told Coach Red Auerbach they wanted to return to Boston. Sauldsberry and Hill joined the five in refusing to play the game.

In November 1961, Sauldsberry was traded to the Chicago Packers (now the Washington Wizards) along with Joe Graboski, Si Green and Fred LaCour for Barney Cable, Archie Dees and Ralph Davis. He played in 49 games for the Packers, averaging 11.7 points and 9.5 rebounds in 30.1 minutes per game. He began the 1962–63 season with the Packers, averaging 12.9 points and 6.8 rebounds in nearly 31 minutes per game.

In January 1963, Sauldsberry was traded back to the Hawks for Barney Cable. On March 13, he was suspended by the Hawks for a week following a dispute with head coach Harry Gallatin. He did not return to the team and was left of its playoff roster. In June 1963, he was waived by the Hawks.

After two years away from the NBA, Sauldsberry worked out for the Boston Celtics during the 1965 pre-season before playing for the New Haven Elms in the Eastern League. In November 1965, he signed with the Celtics for the season. After the NBA refused to accept the contract, Sauldsberry filed a class action suit against J. Walter Kennedy and all the NBA teams, except the Celtics, for a conspiracy to keep him out of the league. In December, the NBA approved the contract when the Celtics and Sauldsberry agreed to conditions laid down to them and the suit was officially dropped in January 1966. He played his last NBA game on March 1, 1966, missing the rest of the regular season and playoffs due to a back injury.

== Later life ==
Sometime in the late 1990s, Sauldsberry was diagnosed with diabetes and had to have his leg amputated.

== Death ==
He died September 3, 2007, aged 73 in Baltimore, Maryland. An article by Dan Klores alleges that when Sauldsberry died, "he was broke, alone and on the verge of losing his left leg to diabetes, which took his right."

== NBA career statistics ==
Legend
GP	Games played	GS	Games started	MPG	Minutes per game
FG%	Field goal percentage	3P%	3-point field goal percentage	FT%	Free throw percentage
RPG	Rebounds per game	APG	Assists per game	SPG	Steals per game
BPG	Blocks per game	PPG	Points per game	**Bold**	Career high
†	Won an NBA championship

=== Regular season ===
Year	Team	GP	MPG	FG%	FT%	RPG	APG	PPG
1957–58	Philadelphia	71	33.5	.360	.615	10.3	.8	12.8
1958–59	Philadelphia	72	**38.1**	.363	.625	**11.5**	1.0	**15.4**
1959–60	Philadelphia	71	26.0	.334	.534	6.3	**1.6**	9.9
1960–61	St. Louis	69	21.6	.299	.560	7.1	1.1	7.5
1961–62	St. Louis	14	20.8	.336	.655	5.1	0.9	7.2
1961–62	Chicago	49	30.1	.344	.638	9.5	1.6	11.7
1962–63	Chicago	**54**	30.8	**.384**	.**685**	6.8	1.2	12.9
1962–63	St. Louis	**23**	16.1	.356	.545	3.5	.5	6.2
1965–66†	Boston	39	13.6	.321	.500	3.6	.4	4.4
Career		462	27.7	.348	.610	7.8	1.1	10.7

=== Playoffs ===
Year	Team	GP	MPG	FG%	FT%	RPG	APG	PPG
1958	Philadelphia	8	**36.3**	.344	.565	**10.9**	.8	12.9
1960	Philadelphia	9	33.1	.340	**.571**	7.1	1.3	12.9
1961	St. Louis	**12**	33.9	**.364**	.560	9.0	**2.8**	**13.7**
Career		29	34.3	.351	.565	8.9	1.8	13.2
