= Si Green =

American basketball player (1933–1980)

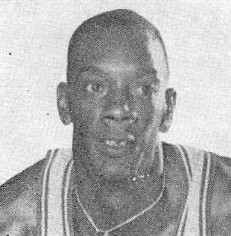
- Green with the Chicago Packers, c. 1962

Personal information
- Born: August 20, 1933 New York City, New York, U.S.
- Died: October 4, 1980 (aged 47) Pittsburgh, Pennsylvania, U.S.
- Listed height: 6 ft 2 in (1.88 m)
- Listed weight: 185 lb (84 kg)

Career information
- High school: Boys (Brooklyn, New York)
- College: Duquesne (1953–1956)
- NBA draft: 1956: 1st round, 1st overall pick
- Drafted by: Rochester Royals
- Playing career: 1956–1967
- Position: Point guard / shooting guard
- Number: 3, 12, 17, 16, 21, 11, 28

Career history
- 1956–1957: Rochester Royals
- 1957–1958: Easton Madisons
- 1958–1959: Cincinnati Royals
- 1959–1961: St. Louis Hawks
- 1961–1965: Chicago Packers / Zephyrs / Baltimore Bullets
- 1965: Boston Celtics
- 1965–1966: New Haven Elms
- 1967: Wilmington Blue Bombers

Career highlights
- All-EPBL First Team (1958); 2× Consensus first-team All-American (1955, 1956); Second-team All-American – NEA (1954); No. 11 retired by Duquesne Dukes

Career NBA statistics
- Points: 4,636 (9.2 ppg)
- Rebounds: 2,152 (4.3 rpg)
- Assists: 1,655 (3.2 apg)
- Stats at NBA.com
- Stats at Basketball Reference
- Collegiate Basketball Hall of Fame

Sihugo "Si" Green (né Lewis; August 20, 1933 – October 4, 1980) was an American professional basketball player. After playing college basketball for the Duquesne Dukes, he was selected as the first pick of the 1956 NBA draft by the Rochester Royals.

== Early life ==
Green was born as Sihugo Lewis in Brooklyn and raised in its Bedford–Stuyvesant neighborhood. He received his name, Sihugo, because of his Native American grandmother. Green did not know its meaning and when often asked would joke: "When they gave me the name, I was too young to remember why." He was nicknamed "Si" while growing up. His mother, Mrs. Lewis, remarried and changed her name to Mrs. Green; "Sihugo Lewis" was still Green's legal name when he enrolled in the United States Army in 1956.

== College career ==
Green attended Boys High School in Brooklyn, New York, where he played for coach Mickey Fisher.

Green then attended Duquesne (1953–1956), where he starred alongside teammate Dick Ricketts and his younger brother, Dave Ricketts. As a sophomore in 1953–1954, Green averaged 13.4 points and 8.2 rebounds, as the Dukes went 26–3 under Coach Dudey Moore, losing in the Final of the 1954 National Invitation Tournament to Holy Cross with future Hall of Famer Tommy Heinsohn.

In 1954–1955, Green averaged 22.0 points and 13.6 rebounds and the Dukes were 22–4, winning the 1955 National Invitation Tournament. In the Final, on March 20, 1955, Duquesne beat the Dayton Flyers 70–58 before a sellout crowd of 18,496 at Madison Square Garden, as Green scored 33 points and Dick Ricketts had 23.

As a senior in 1955–1956, Green averaged 24.5 points and 13.2 rebounds as Duquesne was 17–10 following Dick Ricketts's graduation the year prior. The Dukes won 7 of their last 8 after a slow start to advance to the quarterfinals of the 1956 National Invitation Tournament, losing to eventual champion Louisville.

== Professional career ==
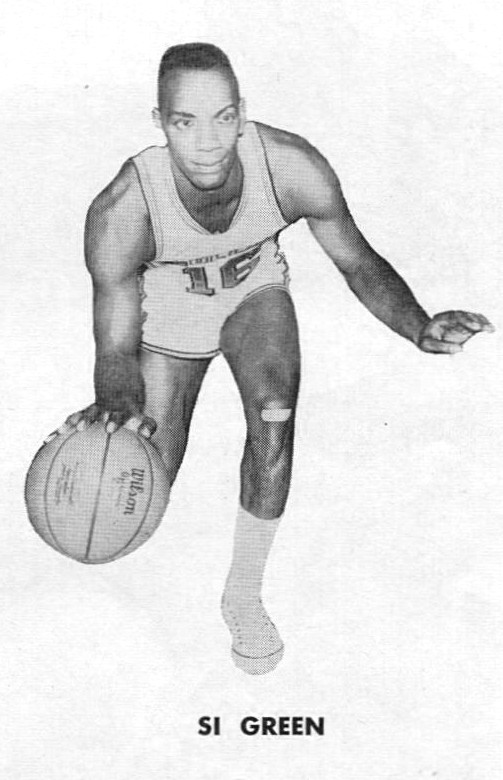
Green with the Baltimore Bullets, c. 1963

A 6-foot-2-inch (1.88 m) guard-forward, on April 30, Green was selected by the Rochester Royals as the first overall NBA draft pick of the 1956 NBA draft over Bill Russell, the University of San Francisco star center. The St. Louis Hawks chose Russell one spot later; the Hawks traded Russell to the Boston Celtics and the Celtics went on to win 11 of the next 13 NBA titles together.

As a rookie in 1956–1957, Green averaged 11.5 points, 5.2 rebounds and 3.6 assists in 14 games for the Royals. He played for the Easton Madisons of the EPBL during the 1957–58 season and was selected to the All-EPBL First Team. Green missed the next NBA season due to military service with the U.S. Army. There, he played on a Fort Dix team with Tom Gola and Alvin Clinkscales that won the U.S. Army championship.

On January 14, 1959, while averaging 12.5 points, 7.0 rebounds and 4.3 assists, Green was traded by the Cincinnati Royals to the St. Louis Hawks for Med Park and Jack Stephens. Green played four seasons for St. Louis, averaging 6.9 points and 4.4 rebounds.

Green was traded by the St. Louis Hawks to the Chicago Packers on November 21, 1961. He was traded, along with Joe Graboski and Woody Sauldsberry for Barney Cable and Archie Dees. With Chicago in 57 games that season, he averaged 13.2 points, 5.6 rebounds and 4.5 assists.

On October 10, 1965, Green was traded by the Baltimore Bullets to the Boston Celtics for a 1966 fifth round draft pick (John Jones was later selected). He averaged 3.2 points in 10 games in a reserve role for the Celtics, playing his last NBA game on November 20, 1965. With the Celtics, Green played with his fellow 1956 draft pick, Bill Russell.

Overall, Green played nine seasons in the NBA league with four teams, scoring 5,039 career points and averaging 9.2 points, 4.3 rebounds and 3.3. assists in 504 career games.

Green played for the New Haven Elms of the Eastern Professional Basketball League (EPBL) during the 1965–66 season. He did not report to the Elms for the 1966–67 season as they did not meet his salary demands. On February 10, 1967, Green was signed by the Wilmington Blue Bombers of the EPBL after they purchased his rights from the Elms.

== Playing style ==
"Si never said a word. He always wore his jumping socks, those thick gray ones with a green trim. The kind hunters wear. That was his superstition. Si's touch outside with a line-drive jumper was pretty good, but he could tell you he was going around you and he'd still get around you. He would give you a fake and a real big first stride," former Duquesne assistant coach Red Manning said in describing Green years later.

== Personal life ==
Green lived in the Pittsburgh neighborhood of Point Breeze with his wife and son. He worked for Associated Textile Systems Inc., a rental laundry, from 1967 until 1980. Green operated as its personnel manager and later vice president of operations. The business was owned by Hal Black, a former Duquesne Dukes basketball player from the 1940s who sponsored Green when he joined the team.

In April 1980, Green had a chest X-ray that revealed the presence of lung cancer. It spread to other parts of his body and led to him leaving work in September 1980. On October 2, 1980, he was reported as being ill in St. Margaret's Hospital in Pittsburgh, Pennsylvania, and entered a serious condition the following day. Green died in hospital from cancer on October 4, 1980.

== Career statistics ==
Legend
GP	Games played	GS	Games started	MPG	Minutes per game
FG%	Field goal percentage	3P%	3-point field goal percentage	FT%	Free throw percentage
RPG	Rebounds per game	APG	Assists per game	SPG	Steals per game
BPG	Blocks per game	PPG	Points per game	**Bold**	Career high
*	Led the league

=== NBA ===
==== Regular season ====
Year	Team	GP	MPG	FG%	FT%	RPG	APG	PPG
1956–57	Rochester	13	32.5	.350	.710	5.2	3.6	11.5
1958–59	Cincinnati	20	33.3	.373	.685	**7.0**	4.3	12.5
1958–59	St. Louis	26	17.0	.313	.621	4.3	1.1	5.6
1959–60	St. Louis	70	19.3	.372	.634	3.7	1.9	6.1
1960–61	St. Louis	**76**	25.9	.366	.704	5.0	3.4	9.2
1961–62	St. Louis	14	19.4	.388	**.800**	3.5	2.6	8.0
1961–62	Chicago	57	**37.1**	.375	.686	6.1	4.9	**13.8**
1962–63	Chicago	73	36.3	.411	.683	4.6	**5.8**	11.7
1963–64	Baltimore	75	27.5	**.415**	.683	3.8	2.9	10.3
1964–65	Baltimore	70	15.5	.413	.627	2.4	2.0	5.7
1965–66	Boston	10	9.2	.387	.500	1.1	.9	3.2
Career		504	26.1	.387	.676	4.3	3.3	9.2

==== Playoffs ====
Year	Team	GP	MPG	FG%	FT%	RPG	APG	PPG
1959	St. Louis	6	21.8	**.480**	.500	3.8	2.3	6.0
1960	St. Louis	**14***	**40.4**	.473	.603	**8.6**	**6.3**	**14.1**
1961	St. Louis	12*	29.2	.378	.676	5.9	4.0	11.4
1965	Baltimore	9	7.2	.438	**.800**	.8	1.7	2.0
Career		41	27.1	.433	.613	5.4	4.0	9.5

== Honors ==
- No. 11 retired by Duquesne University
- Green was named to the Duquesne All-Century Team in 2016.
