= 1960 NBA playoffs =

Playoffs of the 14th NBA Championship (1959-60)

Tournament details
- Dates: March 11 – April 9, 1960
- Season: 1959–60
- Teams: 6

Final positions
- Champions: Boston Celtics (3rd title)
- Runner-up: St. Louis Hawks
- Semifinalists: Minneapolis Lakers; Philadelphia Warriors

The 1960 NBA playoffs was the postseason tournament of the National Basketball Association's 1959–60 season. The tournament concluded with the Eastern Division champion Boston Celtics defeating the Western Division champion St. Louis Hawks 4 games to 3 in the NBA Finals.

This was the second straight and third overall NBA title for Boston, who got revenge for the Hawks' win over them in 1958. The 1960 Finals was the third Celtics–Hawks Finals in the past four years.

== Bracket ==
Division Semifinals
E3	Syracuse	1
E2	Philadelphia	2
W3	Minneapolis	2
W2	Detroit	0

Division Finals
Eastern Division
E1	Boston*	4
E2	Philadelphia	2
Western Division
W1	St. Louis*	4
W3	Minneapolis	3

NBA Finals
E1	Boston*	4
W1	St. Louis*	3

- * Division winner
- Bold Series winner
- Italic Team with home-court advantage in NBA Finals

== Division Semifinals ==
=== Eastern Division Semifinals ===
==== (2) Philadelphia Warriors vs. (3) Syracuse Nationals ====
March 11

Boxscore

Syracuse Nationals 92, Philadelphia Warriors 115
Scoring by quarter: 26–33, 20–22, 28–28, 18–32
Pts: Dick Barnett 19; Rebs: Barney Cable 13; Asts: Larry Costello 4	Pts: Paul Arizin 40; Rebs: Wilt Chamberlain 27; Asts: Tom Gola 7
Philadelphia leads series, 1–0

Philadelphia Civic Center, Philadelphia, Pennsylvania

March 13

Boxscore

Philadelphia Warriors 119, Syracuse Nationals 125
Scoring by quarter: 24–23, 28–33, 33–32, 34–37
Pts: Paul Arizin 29; Rebs: Wilt Chamberlain 18; Asts: Guy Rodgers 6	Pts: Dolph Schayes 40; Rebs: Dolph Schayes 22; Asts: Larry Costello 9
Series tied, 1–1

Onondaga War Memorial, Syracuse, New York

March 14

Boxscore

Syracuse Nationals 112, Philadelphia Warriors 132
Scoring by quarter: 28–31, 26–38, 28–34, 30–29
Pts: Dolph Schayes 31; Rebs: Dolph Schayes 14; Asts: Larry Costello 7	Pts: Wilt Chamberlain 53; Rebs: Tom Gola 23; Asts: Tom Gola 11
Philadelphia wins series, 2–1

Philadelphia Civic Center, Philadelphia, Pennsylvania

- George Yardley's final NBA game.

This was the seventh playoff meeting between these two teams, with the 76ers/Nationals winning four of the first six meetings.

Previous playoff series
Philadelphia 76ers/ Syracuse Nationals leads 4–2 in all-time playoff series

1950

Philadelphia Warriors 0, Syracuse Nationals 2

1950 Eastern Division Semifinals

1951

Philadelphia Warriors 0, Syracuse Nationals 2

1951 Eastern Division Semifinals

1952

Philadelphia Warriors 1, Syracuse Nationals 2

1952 Eastern Division Semifinals

1956

Philadelphia Warriors 3, Syracuse Nationals 2

1956 Eastern Division Finals

1957

Philadelphia Warriors 0, Syracuse Nationals 2

1957 Eastern Division Semifinals

1958

Philadelphia Warriors 2, Syracuse Nationals 1

1958 Eastern Division Semifinals

=== Western Division Semifinals ===
==== (2) Detroit Pistons vs. (3) Minneapolis Lakers ====
March 12

Boxscore

Minneapolis Lakers 113, Detroit Pistons 112
Scoring by quarter: 25–26, 32–25, 23–38, 33–23
Pts: Elgin Baylor 40	Pts: Bailey Howell 29
Minneapolis leads series, 1–0

Grosse Pointe High School, Grosse Pointe Farms, Michigan

March 13

Boxscore

Detroit Pistons 99, Minneapolis Lakers 114
Scoring by quarter: 25–22, 28–34, 21–35, 25–23
Pts: Gene Shue 27	Pts: Frank Selvy 30
Minneapolis wins series, 2–0

Minneapolis Armory, Minneapolis, Minnesota

- Dick McGuire's final NBA game.

This was the seventh playoff meeting between these two teams, with the Lakers winning five of the first six meetings.

Previous playoff series
Minneapolis leads 5–1 in all-time playoff series

1950

Fort Wayne Pistons 0, Minneapolis Lakers 2

1950 Central Division Finals

1953

Fort Wayne Pistons 2, Minneapolis Lakers 3

1953 Western Division Finals

1954

Fort Wayne Pistons 0, Minneapolis Lakers 2

1954 Western Division Round Robin Semifinals

1955

Fort Wayne Pistons 3, Minneapolis Lakers 1

1955 Western Division Finals

1957

Fort Wayne Pistons 0, Minneapolis Lakers 2

1957 Western Division Semifinals

1959

Detroit Pistons 1, Minneapolis Lakers 2

1959 Western Division Semifinals

== Division Finals ==
=== Eastern Division Finals ===
==== (1) Boston Celtics vs. (2) Philadelphia Warriors ====
March 16

Boxscore

Philadelphia Warriors 105, Boston Celtics 111
Scoring by quarter: 24–37, 29–27, 28–25, 24–22
Pts: Wilt Chamberlain 42; Rebs: Wilt Chamberlain 29; Asts: Paul Arizin 5	Pts: Bill Sharman 25; Rebs: Bill Russell 30; Asts: Bob Cousy 13
Boston leads series, 1–0

Boston Garden, Boston, Massachusetts

March 18

Boxscore

Boston Celtics 110, Philadelphia Warriors 115
Scoring by quarter: 27–31, 26–32, 32–27, 25–25
Pts: Tom Heinsohn 26; Rebs: Bill Russell 20; Asts: Bob Cousy 6	Pts: Paul Arizin 30; Rebs: Wilt Chamberlain 28; Asts: Guy Rodgers 9
Series tied, 1–1

Philadelphia Civic Center, Philadelphia, Pennsylvania

March 19

Boxscore

Philadelphia Warriors 90, Boston Celtics 120
Scoring by quarter: 23–22, 16–28, 25–37, 26–33
Pts: Woody Sauldsberry 22; Rebs: Wilt Chamberlain 15; Asts: Wilt Chamberlain 6	Pts: Bill Russell 26; Rebs: Bill Russell 39; Asts: Bob Cousy 8
Boston leads series, 2–1

Boston Garden, Boston, Massachusetts

March 20

Boxscore

Boston Celtics 112, Philadelphia Warriors 104
Scoring by quarter: 38–22, 20–29, 22–25, 32–28
Pts: Tom Heinsohn 28; Rebs: Bill Russell 21; Asts: Bob Cousy 8	Pts: Paul Arizin 35; Rebs: Wilt Chamberlain 34; Asts: Guy Rodgers 5
Boston leads series, 3–1

Philadelphia Civic Center, Philadelphia, Pennsylvania

March 22

Boxscore

Philadelphia Warriors 128, Boston Celtics 107
Scoring by quarter: 33–18, 32–27, 32–30, 31–32
Pts: Wilt Chamberlain 50; Rebs: Wilt Chamberlain 35; Asts: Tom Gola 10	Pts: Bill Russell 22; Rebs: Bill Russell 27; Asts: Bob Cousy 7
Boston leads series, 3–2

Boston Garden, Boston, Massachusetts

March 24

Boxscore

Boston Celtics 119, Philadelphia Warriors 117
Scoring by quarter: 24–33, 27–17, 33–34, 35–33
Pts: Bill Russell 25; Rebs: Bill Russell 25; Asts: Bob Cousy 4	Pts: Guy Rodgers 31; Rebs: Wilt Chamberlain 24; Asts: Guy Rodgers 9
Boston wins series, 4–2

Philadelphia Civic Center, Philadelphia, Pennsylvania

This was the second playoff meeting between these two teams, with the Celtics winning the first meeting.

Previous playoff series
Boston leads 1–0 in all-time playoff series

1958

Boston Celtics 4, Philadelphia Warriors 1

1958 Eastern Division Finals

=== Western Division Finals ===
==== (1) St. Louis Hawks vs. (3) Minneapolis Lakers ====
March 16

Boxscore

Minneapolis Lakers 99, St. Louis Hawks 112
Scoring by quarter: 19–27, 23–28, 28–31, 29–26
Pts: Elgin Baylor 19; Rebs: Baylor, Hundley 9 each	Pts: Cliff Hagan 29; Rebs: Bob Pettit 19
St. Louis leads series, 1–0

Kiel Auditorium, St. Louis, Missouri
Attendance: 8,377
Referees: Arnie Heft, Richie Powers

March 17

Boxscore

Minneapolis Lakers 120, St. Louis Hawks 113
Scoring by quarter: 24–31, 29–29, 33–30, 34–23
Pts: Elgin Baylor 40; Rebs: Elgin Baylor 14	Pts: Clyde Lovellette 30; Rebs: Bob Pettit 15
Series tied, 1–1

Kiel Auditorium, St. Louis, Missouri
Attendance: 8,614
Referees: Arnie Heft, Richie Powers

March 19

Boxscore

St. Louis Hawks 93, Minneapolis Lakers 89
Scoring by quarter: 26–15, 22–31, 24–24, 21–19
Pts: Bob Pettit 35	Pts: Elgin Baylor 27
St. Louis leads series, 2–1

Minneapolis Armory, Minneapolis, Minnesota

March 20

Boxscore

St. Louis Hawks 101, Minneapolis Lakers 103
Scoring by quarter: 32–22, 27–25, 20–25, 22–31
Pts: Cliff Hagan 28; Rebs: Clyde Lovellette 15	Pts: Elgin Baylor 39; Rebs: Elgin Baylor 16
Series tied, 2–2

Minneapolis Armory, Minneapolis, Minnesota
Attendance: 6,852
Referees: Sid Borgia, Richie Powers

March 22

Boxscore

Minneapolis Lakers 117, St. Louis Hawks 110 (OT)
Scoring by quarter: 14–26, 33–21, 28–26, 28–30, Overtime: 14–7
Pts: Elgin Baylor 40; Rebs: Elgin Baylor 18	Pts: Bob Pettit 25; Rebs: Bob Pettit 19
Minneapolis leads series, 3–2

Kiel Auditorium, St. Louis, Missouri
Attendance: 10,043
Referees: Arnie Heft, Richie Powers

- Slater Martin's final NBA game.

March 24

Boxscore

St. Louis Hawks 117, Minneapolis Lakers 96
Scoring by quarter: 30–19, 26–32, 26–17, 35–28
Pts: Bob Pettit 30; Rebs: Bob Pettit 18	Pts: Elgin Baylor 38; Rebs: Frank Selvy 12
Series tied, 3–3

Minneapolis Armory, Minneapolis, Minnesota

March 26

Boxscore

Minneapolis Lakers 86, St. Louis Hawks 97
Scoring by quarter: 19–26, 19–25, 26–24, 22–22
Pts: Elgin Baylor 33; Rebs: Elgin Baylor 13	Pts: Bob Pettit 28; Rebs: Bob Pettit 20
St. Louis wins series, 4–3

Kiel Auditorium, St. Louis, Missouri
Attendance: 6,195
Referees: Arnie Heft, Mendy Rudolph

This was the fourth playoff meeting between these two teams, with the Hawks winning two of the first three meetings.

Previous playoff series
St. Louis leads 2–1 in all-time playoff series

1956

St. Louis Hawks 2, Minneapolis Lakers 1

1956 Western Division Semifinals

1957

St. Louis Hawks 3, Minneapolis Lakers 0

1957 Western Division Finals

1959

St. Louis Hawks 2, Minneapolis Lakers 4

1959 Western Division Finals

== NBA Finals: (E1) Boston Celtics vs. (W1) St. Louis Hawks ==
March 27

Boxscore

St. Louis Hawks 122, Boston Celtics 140
Scoring by quarter: 25–30, 26–46, 34–38, 37–26
Pts: Cliff Hagan 25; Rebs: Bob Pettit 17; Asts: Johnny McCarthy 6	Pts: Tom Heinsohn 24; Rebs: Bill Russell 19; Asts: Bob Cousy 12
Boston leads series, 1–0

Boston Garden, Boston, Massachusetts
Attendance: 10,002

March 29

Boxscore

St. Louis Hawks 113, Boston Celtics 103
Scoring by quarter: 25–21, 24–35, 34–23, 30–24
Pts: Bob Pettit 35; Rebs: Bob Pettit 22; Asts: Bob Pettit 7	Pts: Bill Sharman 30; Rebs: Bill Russell 40; Asts: Bob Cousy 8
Series tied, 1–1

Boston Garden, Boston, Massachusetts
Attendance: 13,909

- Bill Russell's 40 rebounds set a single-game Finals record for an individual player.

April 2

Boxscore

Boston Celtics 102, St. Louis Hawks 86
Scoring by quarter: 31–32, 23–23, 23–17, 25–14
Pts: Tom Heinsohn 30; Rebs: Bill Russell 19; Asts: Bob Cousy 13	Pts: Bob Pettit 23; Rebs: Bob Pettit 18; Asts: Green, Lovellette 6 each
Boston leads series, 2–1

Kiel Auditorium, St. Louis, Missouri
Attendance: 10,612
Referees: Sid Borgia, Arnie Heft

April 3

Boxscore

Boston Celtics 96, St. Louis Hawks 106
Scoring by quarter: 18–28, 21–22, 24–31, 33–25
Pts: Ramsey, Sharman 20 each Rebs: Bill Russell 19; Asts: Bob Cousy 4	Pts: Bob Pettit 32; Rebs: Bob Pettit 11; Asts: Johnny McCarthy 8
Series tied, 2–2

Kiel Auditorium, St. Louis, Missouri
Attendance: 10,612
Referees: Jim Duffy, Mendy Rudolph

April 5

Boxscore

St. Louis Hawks 102, Boston Celtics 127
Scoring by quarter: 26–34, 27–31, 25–30, 24–32
Pts: Cliff Hagan 28; Rebs: Cliff Hagan 12; Asts: Si Green 8	Pts: Tom Heinsohn 34; Rebs: Bill Russell 26; Asts: Bob Cousy 10
Boston leads series, 3–2

Boston Garden, Boston, Massachusetts
Attendance: 13,909

April 7

Boxscore

Boston Celtics 102, St. Louis Hawks 105
Scoring by quarter: 16–24, 36–30, 12–36, 38–15
Pts: Bill Russell 17; Rebs: Bill Russell 16; Asts: Bob Cousy 9	Pts: Cliff Hagan 36; Rebs: Clyde Lovellette 15; Asts: Johnny McCarthy 9
Series tied, 3–3

Kiel Auditorium, St. Louis, Missouri
Attendance: 10,612
Referees: Jim Duffy, Mendy Rudolph

April 9

Boxscore

St. Louis Hawks 103, Boston Celtics 122
Scoring by quarter: 30–29, 23–41, 25–26, 25–26
Pts: Bob Pettit 22; Rebs: Bob Pettit 14; Asts: Si Green 5	Pts: Frank Ramsey 24; Rebs: Bill Russell 35; Asts: Bob Cousy 14
Boston wins series, 4–3

Boston Garden, Boston, Massachusetts
Attendance: 13,909

This was the third playoff meeting between these two teams, with both teams splitting the first two meetings.

Previous playoff series
Tied 1–1 in all-time playoff series

1957

Boston Celtics 4, St. Louis Hawks 3

1957 NBA Finals

1958

Boston Celtics 2, St. Louis Hawks 4

1958 NBA Finals
