= Chuck Share =

American basketball player (1927–2012)

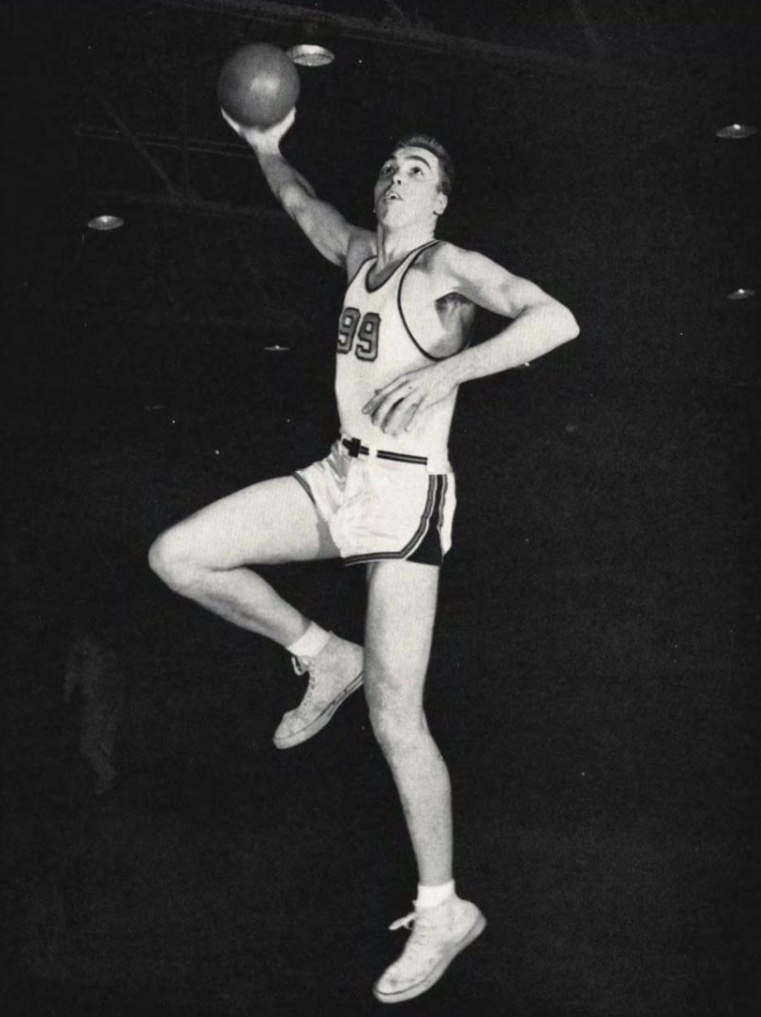
- Share during his senior season at Bowling Green

Personal information
- Born: March 14, 1927 Akron, Ohio, U.S.
- Died: June 7, 2012 (aged 85) Chesterfield, Missouri, U.S.
- Listed height: 6 ft 11 in (2.11 m)
- Listed weight: 235 lb (107 kg)

Career information
- High school: Western Hills (Cincinnati, Ohio)
- College: Bowling Green (1946–1950)
- NBA draft: 1950: 1st round, 1st overall pick
- Drafted by: Boston Celtics
- Playing career: 1950–1960
- Position: Center
- Number: 18, 5, 70, 13, 44

Career history
- 1950–1951: Waterloo Hawks
- 1951–1953: Fort Wayne Pistons
- 1953–1960: Milwaukee / St. Louis Hawks
- 1960: Minneapolis Lakers

Career highlights
- NBA champion (1958); Third-team All-American – AP, UPI (1950)

Career NBA statistics
- Points: 4,928 (8.3 ppg)
- Rebounds: 4,986 (8.4 rpg)
- Assists: 809 (1.4 apg)
- Stats at NBA.com
- Stats at Basketball Reference

Charles Edward Share (March 14, 1927 – June 7, 2012) was an American basketball player in the National Basketball Association (NBA). Share has the distinction of being the first NBA draft pick ever: he was selected by the Boston Celtics as the No. 1 overall pick in the inaugural 1950 NBA draft.

== Early life ==
Share attended Western Hills High School in Cincinnati, Ohio. He had an injured ankle and did not begin playing basketball until his junior year at Western Hills.

== College career ==
Share attended Bowling Green State University in Bowling Green, Ohio, after being recruited by Coach Harold Anderson. He was named a 1950 All-American his senior year.

Share graduated as the Bowling Green College Falcons' all-time scoring leader with 1,730 points. With Share, Bowling Green won 28 games in 1946–47, 27 games in 1947–48, 24 games in 1948-49 and 19 games in 1949–50. Share has his career-high 39 points against Loyola (Calif.) on Dec. 22, 1949 in Madison Square Garden.

== NBA career ==
=== Celtics/Waterloo Hawks ===
Share was drafted by the Celtics, whose fans wanted the team to draft local Holy Cross star, Bob Cousy with the pick. The Celtics' new Coach Red Auerbach defended the unpopular pick of Share, saying "We need a big man. Little men are a dime a dozen. I'm supposed to win, not go after local yokels."

In an irony, future Hall of Famer Cousy ended up being drafted third by the Tri-Cities Blackhawks. Cousy then balked at playing in Moline, Illinois, eventually forcing his rights to be sold to the Chicago Stags. The Stags then folded before the season and the Celtics chose Cousy in the dispersal draft.

For his part, Share did not sign with the Celtics. Instead he signed with the Waterloo Hawks in the fledgling National Professional Basketball League (1950–51), playing for Coach Jack Smiley. Share averaged 11.0 points for the Hawks, playing in 19 games. The NPBL, composed of some former NBA teams in small markets and new teams in major markets, folded after the season.

Then on April 26, 1951, Share's rights were traded by the Celtics to the Fort Wayne Pistons for future Hall of Famer Bill Sharman, who had refused to sign with the Pistons.

In two-and-a-half seasons with Fort Wayne, Share averaged 4.2 points and 5.1 rebounds in limited playing time.

=== St. Louis: 2 NBA Finals, Championship ===
On December 21, 1953, Share was traded by the Fort Wayne Pistons to the Milwaukee Hawks for Max Zaslofsky.

In seven seasons with the Milwaukee/St Louis Hawks, Share averaged a near double-double of 9.2 points and 9.9 rebounds. His role as a rebounding force in the middle, setting screens and playing strong defense freed Naismith Basketball Hall of Fame teammates Bob Pettit, Ed Macauley, Cliff Hagan and Slater Martin to better play their games. Share was named as the team captain and the Hawks made the NBA Finals against the Celtics in 1957 and 1958.

Share was the captain of the 1958 NBA champion St. Louis Hawks team. In the 1958 NBA Finals victory against the Celtics, Share averaged 6.2 points and 6.0 rebounds in the six-game series, in a key reserve role.

On February 1, 1960, the Hawks traded Share, Nick Mantis and Willie Merriweather to the Minneapolis Lakers for Larry Foust. Initially, Share refused to go to the Lakers, but he reconsidered and went to Minneapolis in time for the playoffs. The Lakers were eventually defeated by the Hawks in the Western Division Finals.

Share then retired at the end of the 1959–1960 season.

Overall, Share played nine years in the NBA for the Fort Wayne Pistons, Milwaukee/St. Louis Hawks and the Minneapolis Lakers. He played 596 games, with 4,928 points and 4,986 rebounds. His career averages were 8.3 points and 8.4 rebounds. Share led the NBA in disqualifications during the 1954–55 season.

== Personal life ==
After retiring from basketball, Share never left the St. Louis area and pursued business ventures. Share started Sharick Packaging, Inc.and then sold Sharick in 1985. He then formed Sylvan-Edge Farm with his wife, Rose.

Share died on June 7, 2012, in Chesterfield, Missouri, at age 85. He had lived in Creve Coeur, Missouri, and was survived by his wife Rose and daughters Ann and Cindy.

== Career statistics ==
Legend
GP	Games played	GS	Games started	MPG	Minutes per game
FG%	Field goal percentage	3P%	3-point field goal percentage	FT%	Free throw percentage
RPG	Rebounds per game	APG	Assists per game	SPG	Steals per game
BPG	Blocks per game	PPG	Points per game	**Bold**	Career high
†	Won an NBA championship	*	Led the league

=== NBA ===
==== Regular season ====
Year	Team	GP	MPG	FG%	FT%	RPG	APG	PPG
1951–52	Fort Wayne	63	14.0	.322	.619	5.3	1.0	3.9
1952–53	Fort Wayne	67	15.6	.358	.735	5.6	1.1	5.3
1953–54	Fort Wayne	21	7.4	.257	.600	3.0	.5	1.7
1953–54	Milwaukee	47	**30.2**	.391	.694	10.5	1.5	11.2
1954–55	Milwaukee	69	24.4	.407	.713	9.9	1.2	11.9
1955–56	St. Louis	**72**	27.4	.430	.695	**10.8**	**1.8**	**13.6**
1956–57	St. Louis	**72***	23.2	.439	.684	8.9	1.1	10.3
1957–58†	St. Louis	**72***	25.3	.396	.648	10.4	**1.8**	8.6
1958–59	St. Louis	**72***	23.8	.386	.755	9.1	1.4	6.0
1959–60	St. Louis	38	16.7	.381	.658	5.7	1.6	4.3
1959–60	Minneapolis	3	6.0	**.750**	**1.000**	2.0	.7	2.3
Career		596	21.9	.400	.693	8.4	1.4	8.3

==== Playoffs ====
Year	Team	GP	MPG	FG%	FT%	RPG	APG	PPG
1952	Fort Wayne	2	17.5	**.727**	.600	5.0	1.5	9.5
1953	Fort Wayne	8	24.8	.407	.667	6.5	1.5	6.0
1956	St. Louis	8	**28.9**	.493	.646	**9.1**	**1.6**	**12.9**
1957	St. Louis	10*	16.8	.431	.600	6.3	.6	9.2
1958†	St. Louis	**11***	18.3	.393	.658	6.2	1.0	6.6
1959	St. Louis	6	20.3	.296	.714	8.7	1.5	4.3
1960	Minneapolis	9	13.7	.429	**.909**	3.8	.6	2.4
Career		57	19.9	.435	.659	6.5	1.1	7.1

== Honors ==
- Share was inducted into the St. Louis Sports Hall of Fame in 2017.
- Share was inducted into the Bowling Green State University Athletics Hall of Fame in 1964.
