= Bobby Smith (basketball) =

American basketball player and coach (1937–2020)

Personal information
- Born: August 20, 1937 Charleston, West Virginia, U.S.
- Died: October 24, 2020 (aged 83) Naples, Florida, U.S.
- Listed height: 6 ft 4 in (1.93 m)
- Listed weight: 190 lb (86 kg)

Career information
- High school: Stonewall Jackson (Charleston, West Virginia)
- College: West Virginia (1956–1959)
- NBA draft: 1959: 3rd round, 18th overall pick
- Drafted by: Minneapolis Lakers
- Position: Guard
- Number: 24, 21

Career history
- 1959–1960, 1961–1962: Minneapolis / Los Angeles Lakers
- Stats at NBA.com
- Stats at Basketball Reference

Robert Joseph Smith (born August 20, 1937 – October 24, 2020) was an American professional basketball player and coach.

A 6'4" guard from West Virginia University, Smith was drafted by the Minneapolis Lakers in the third round of the 1959 NBA draft and appeared in 13 games with the Lakers over two seasons. He scored 37 points in his career. Smith was head coach for the men's varsity basketball at George C. Marshall High School during the 1960s and 1970s. Smith returned to West Virginia University (WVU) to serve as assistant coach from 1978 to 1985. He was inducted into the WVU Sports Hall of Fame in 2009.

== Career statistics ==
Legend
GP	Games played	GS	Games started	MPG	Minutes per game
FG%	Field goal percentage	3P%	3-point field goal percentage	FT%	Free throw percentage
RPG	Rebounds per game	APG	Assists per game	SPG	Steals per game
BPG	Blocks per game	PPG	Points per game	**Bold**	Career high

=== NBA ===
==== Regular season ====
Year	Team	GP	MPG	FG%	FT%	RPG	APG	PPG
1959–60	Minneapolis	**10**	**13.0**	**.241**	**.688**	**3.3**	**1.4**	**3.7**
1961–62	L.A. Lakers	3	2.3	.000	–	.0	.0	.0
Career		13	10.5	.236	.688	2.5	1.1	2.8
