= 1959–60 Boston Celtics season =

NBA basketball team season (won championship)

- NBA champions
- Division champions
- Head coach: Red Auerbach
- Arena: Boston Garden

Results
- Record: 59–16 (.787)
- Place: Division: 1st (Eastern)
- Playoff finish: NBA champions (Defeated Hawks 4–3)
- Stats at Basketball Reference

Local media
- Television: WHDH-TV
- Radio: WHDH

The 1959–60 Boston Celtics season was the 14th season for the franchise in the National Basketball Association (NBA). The Celtics finished the season by winning their third NBA Championship.

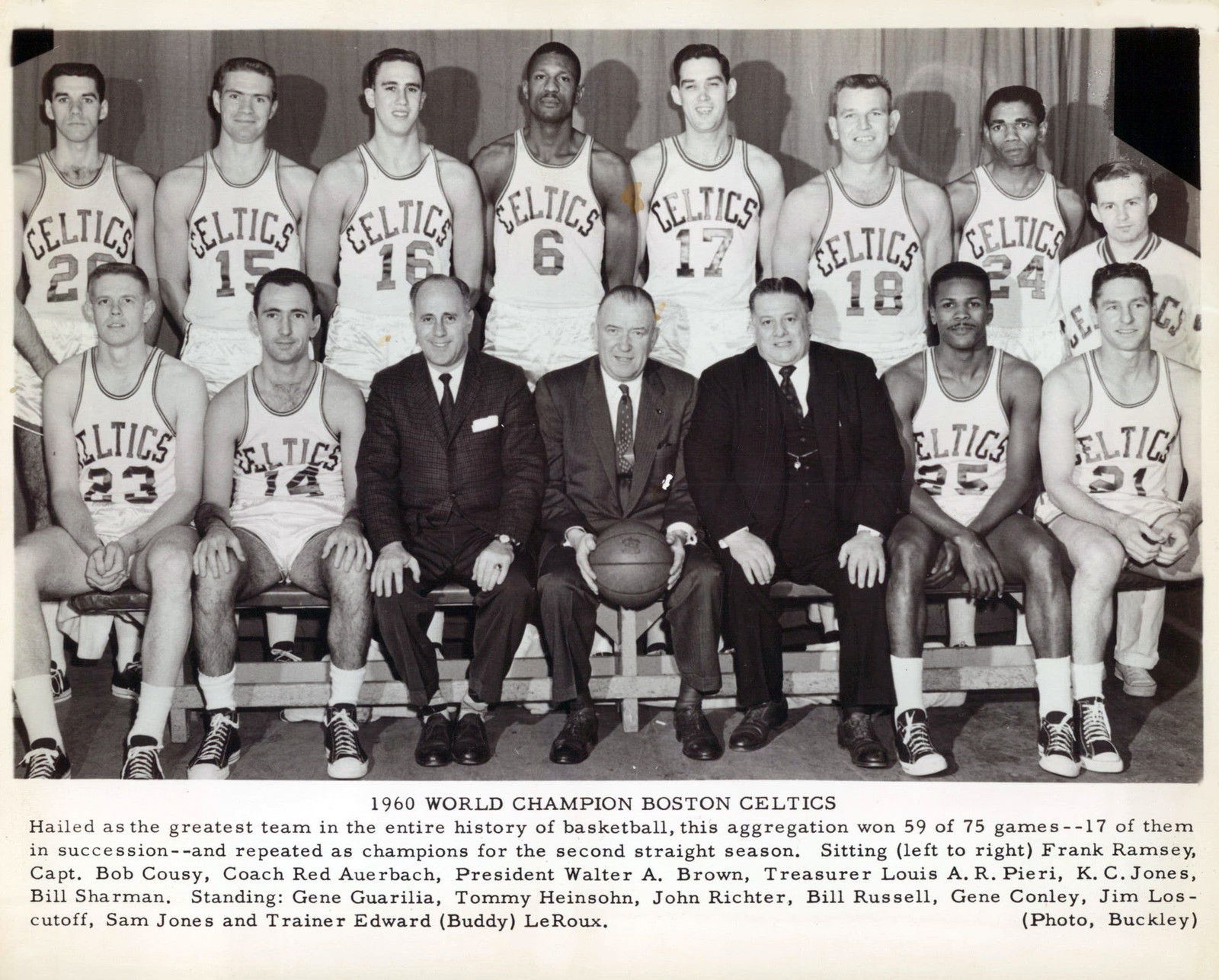
The complete Celtics roster.

== Regular season ==
=== Season standings ===
Eastern Division	W	L	PCT	GB	Home	Road	Neutral	Div
x-Boston Celtics	59	16	.787	–	25–2	24–9	10–5	28–11
x-Philadelphia Warriors	49	26	.653	10	22–6	12–19	15–1	22–17
x-Syracuse Nationals	45	30	.600	14	25–4	12–19	8–7	21–18
New York Knicks	27	48	.360	32	13–18	9–19	5–11	7–32

=== Game log ===
1959–60 game log
#	Date	Opponent	Score	High points	Record
1	October 17	Cincinnati	125–129	Bill Russell (32)	1–0
2	October 24	@ Syracuse	121–109	Tom Heinsohn (24)	2–0
3	October 31	@ New York	123–109	Bill Russell (29)	3–0
4	November 1	@ Cincinnati	124–109	Bill Sharman (25)	4–0
5	November 3	@ St. Louis	103–98	Cousy, Russell (17)	5–0
6	November 7	Philadelphia	106–115	Bill Sharman (25)	6–0
7	November 8	@ Minneapolis	115–136	Sam Jones (22)	6–1
8	November 10	vs. Detroit	109–128	Bob Cousy (26)	7–1
9	November 11	Cincinnati	118–151	Bill Sharman (32)	8–1
10	November 14	St. Louis	111–113	Sam Jones (27)	9–1
11	November 15	@ Cincinnati	134–128	Bob Cousy (38)	10–1
12	November 17	@ Detroit	132–129 (2OT)	S. Jones, Sharman (28)	11–1
13	November 18	@ Syracuse	103–138	Sam Jones (28)	11–2
14	November 20	Syracuse	101–114	Bill Sharman (25)	12–2
15	November 21	@ New York	128–127	Bob Cousy (32)	13–2
16	November 25	Philadelphia	123–113	Sam Jones (20)	13–3
17	November 26	@ Philadelphia	130–143	Gene Conley (24)	13–4
18	November 28	Detroit	110–136	Frank Ramsey (24)	14–4
19	November 29	vs. Minneapolis	109–93	Bill Sharman (29)	15–4
20	December 3	vs. Cincinnati	111–114	Bill Sharman (27)	16–4
21	December 4	New York	107–122	Bill Russell (26)	17–4
22	December 6	@ Minneapolis	121–104	Bill Sharman (24)	18–4
23	December 8	@ New York	121–105	Frank Ramsey (27)	19–4
24	December 9	Philadelphia	116–137	Frank Ramsey (29)	20–4
25	December 11	St. Louis	99–122	Tom Heinsohn (29)	21–4
26	December 12	@ Philadelphia	126–117	Bill Russell (26)	22–4
27	December 17	vs. New York	126–137	Tom Heinsohn (32)	23–4
28	December 19	New York	116–119	Bill Sharman (25)	24–4
29	December 20	@ Syracuse	132–127	Bill Sharman (30)	25–4
30	December 22	@ Detroit	136–104	Bill Sharman (26)	26–4
31	December 25	@ New York	123–119	Sam Jones (27)	27–4
32	December 27	@ Cincinnati	122–111	Bob Cousy (25)	28–4
33	December 28	Minneapolis	104–107	Tom Heinsohn (21)	29–4
34	December 30	@ St. Louis	96–82	Frank Ramsey (17)	30–4
35	January 1	vs. Cincinnati	128–115	Bill Sharman (34)	30–5
36	January 2	@ Philadelphia	117–118	Sam Jones (22)	30–6
37	January 3	@ Syracuse	113–114	Tom Heinsohn (40)	30–7
38	January 4	Syracuse	120–127	Bill Russell (32)	31–7
39	January 5	vs. Syracuse	145–143 (OT)	Bob Cousy (35)	31–8
40	January 9	@ Detroit	126–103	Bob Cousy (26)	32–8
41	January 10	@ St. Louis	111–121	Tom Heinsohn (29)	32–9
42	January 12	vs. Syracuse	127–120	Heinsohn, Ramsey (22)	32–10
43	January 13	St. Louis	112–134	Frank Ramsey (27)	33–10
44	January 15	@ Philadelphia	124–112	Heinsohn, Ramsey (21)	34–10
45	January 17	Philadelphia	123–129	Bill Sharman (31)	35–10
46	January 20	New York	126–144	Tom Heinsohn (43)	36–10
47	January 23	Syracuse	121–130	Tom Heinsohn (32)	37–10
48	January 24	@ Syracuse	131–110	Bill Russell (28)	38–10
49	January 27	St. Louis	114–127	Cousy, Heinsohn (25)	39–10
50	January 29	@ Philadelphia	116–124	Cousy, Heinsohn (29)	39–11
51	January 30	vs. Cincinnati	107–129	Bill Sharman (26)	40–11
52	January 31	Detroit	128–146	Tom Heinsohn (28)	41–11
53	February 2	vs. St. Louis	114–113	Bob Cousy (23)	41–12
54	February 3	Minneapolis	108–128	Bill Sharman (26)	42–12
55	February 5	Syracuse	100–124	Frank Ramsey (25)	43–12
56	February 6	@ New York	143–117	Heinsohn, Russell (29)	44–12
57	February 7	New York	142–135	Bob Cousy (46)	44–13
58	February 9	vs. Minneapolis	90–129	Tom Heinsohn (24)	45–13
59	February 10	vs. Detroit	121–153	Heinsohn, Sharman (28)	46–13
60	February 13	Philadelphia	120–122	Tom Heinsohn (39)	47–13
61	February 14	@ Philadelphia	125–115	Tom Heinsohn (30)	48–13
62	February 16	vs. Minneapolis	122–130	Bill Sharman (26)	49–13
63	February 18	vs. New York	104–109	Tom Heinsohn (24)	50–13
64	February 19	@ Detroit	136–116	Tom Heinsohn (32)	51–13
65	February 20	@ St. Louis	105–121	Tom Heinsohn (20)	51–14
66	February 21	@ Cincinnati	115–108	Bill Russell (27)	52–14
67	February 23	vs. Philadelphia	126–108	Tom Heinsohn (26)	52–15
68	February 24	vs. Minneapolis	110–131	Frank Ramsey (25)	53–15
69	February 25	vs. Detroit	107–121	Bill Russell (29)	54–15
70	February 26	Minneapolis	111–128	Bob Cousy (26)	55–15
71	February 28	@ New York	129–125	Cousy, Russell (27)	56–15
72	March 2	Philadelphia	119–133	Bill Sharman (31)	57–15
73	March 3	@ Syracuse	108–149	Bill Sharman (22)	57–16
74	March 6	Syracuse	117–126	Tom Heinsohn (37)	58–16
75	March 9	New York	128–148	Bill Sharman (22)	59–16

== Playoffs ==
1960 playoff game log
Division Finals: 4–2 (home: 2–1; road: 2–1)

Game	Date	Team	Score	High points	High rebounds	High assists	Location	Series
1	March 16	Philadelphia	W 111–105	Bill Sharman (25)	Bill Russell (30)	Bob Cousy (13)	Boston Garden	1–0
2	March 18	@ Philadelphia	L 110–115	Tom Heinsohn (26)	Bill Russell (20)	Bob Cousy (6)	Philadelphia Civic Center	1–1
3	March 19	Philadelphia	W 120–90	Bill Russell (26)	Bill Russell (39)	Bob Cousy (8)	Boston Garden	2–1
4	March 20	@ Philadelphia	W 112–104	Tom Heinsohn (28)	Bill Russell (21)	Bob Cousy (8)	Philadelphia Civic Center	3–1
5	March 22	Philadelphia	L 107–128	Bill Russell (22)	Bill Russell (27)	Bob Cousy (7)	Boston Garden	3–2
6	March 24	@ Philadelphia	W 119–117	Bill Russell (25)	Bill Russell (25)	Bob Cousy (4)	Philadelphia Civic Center	4–2

NBA Finals: 4–3 (home: 3–1; road: 1–2)

Game	Date	Team	Score	High points	High rebounds	High assists	Location Attendance	Series
1	March 27	St. Louis	W 140–122	Tom Heinsohn (24)	Bill Russell (19)	Bob Cousy (12)	Boston Garden; 10,002	1–0
2	March 29	St. Louis	L 103–113	Bill Sharman (30)	Bill Russell (40)	Bob Cousy (8)	Boston Garden; 13,909	1–1
3	April 2	@ St. Louis	W 102–86	Tom Heinsohn (30)	Bill Russell (16)	Bob Cousy (13)	Kiel Auditorium; 10,612	2–1
4	April 3	@ St. Louis	L 96–106	Ramsey, Sharman (20)	Bill Russell (19)	Bob Cousy (4)	Kiel Auditorium; 10,612	2–2
5	April 5	St. Louis	W 127–102	Tom Heinsohn (34)	Bill Russell (26)	Bob Cousy (10)	Boston Garden; 13,909	3–2
6	April 7	@ St. Louis	L 102–105	Bill Russell (17)	Bill Russell (16)	Bob Cousy (9)	Kiel Auditorium; 10,612	3–3
7	April 9	St. Louis	W 122–103	Frank Ramsey (24)	Bill Russell (35)	Bob Cousy (14)	Boston Garden; 13,909	4–3

1960 schedule

=== Roster ===
1959–60 Boston Celtics roster
Players

Pos.	No.	Player	Height	Weight	DOB	From
PF	17	Gene Conley	6 ft 8 in (2.03 m)	225 lb (102 kg)	1930–11–10	Washington State
PG	14	Bob Cousy	6 ft 1 in (1.85 m)	175 lb (79 kg)	1928-08-09	Holy Cross
SF	20	Gene Guarilia	6 ft 5 in (1.96 m)	220 lb (100 kg)	1937-09-13	George Washington
PF	15, 20	Tom Heinsohn	6 ft 7 in (2.01 m)	218 lb (99 kg)	1934–08–26	Holy Cross
PG	25	K.C. Jones	6 ft 1 in (1.85 m)	200 lb (91 kg)	1932–05–25	San Francisco
SG	24	Sam Jones	6 ft 4 in (1.93 m)	198 lb (90 kg)	1933-06-24	North Carolina Central
PG	19	Maurice King	6 ft 2 in (1.88 m)	195 lb (88 kg)	1935-03-12	Kansas
SF	18	Jim Loscutoff	6 ft 5 in (1.96 m)	220 lb (100 kg)	1930–02–04	Oregon
SG	23	Frank Ramsey	6 ft 3 in (1.91 m)	190 lb (86 kg)	1931–07–13	Kentucky
C	16	John Richter	6 ft 9 in (2.06 m)	225 lb (102 kg)	1937-03-12	NC State
C	6	Bill Russell	6 ft 10 in (2.08 m)	215 lb (98 kg)	1934–02–12	San Francisco
SG	21	Bill Sharman	6 ft 1 in (1.85 m)	175 lb (79 kg)	1926–05–25	USC

Coaches
Head coach
- Red Auerbach

Legend
- (DP) Unsigned draft pick
- (FA) Free agent
- (S) Suspended
- Injured

Roster

== Awards and honors ==
- Bob Cousy, All-NBA First Team
- Bill Russell, All-NBA Second Team
- Bill Sharman, All-NBA Second Team
