= Barney Cable =

American basketball player (1935–2026)

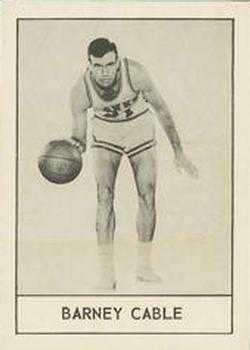

Personal information
- Born: July 29, 1935 Rochester, Pennsylvania, U.S.
- Died: January 26, 2026 (aged 90)
- Listed height: 6 ft 7 in (2.01 m)
- Listed weight: 175 lb (79 kg)

Career information
- High school: Rochester (Rochester, Pennsylvania)
- College: Bradley (1955–1958)
- NBA draft: 1958: 2nd round, 10th overall pick
- Drafted by: Detroit Pistons
- Playing career: 1958–1967
- Position: Small forward / power forward
- Number: 10, 23, 35, 21
- Coaching career: 1966–1970

Career history

Playing
- 1958–1959: Detroit Pistons
- 1959–1961: Syracuse Nationals
- 1961: Chicago Packers
- 1961–1963: St. Louis Hawks
- 1963–1964: Chicago Zephyrs / Baltimore Bullets
- 1964–1967: Wilmington Blue Bombers

Coaching
- 1966–1968: Wilmington Blue Bombers
- 1969–1970: Scranton Miners

Career highlights
- As player: 2× EPBL champion (1966, 1967); First-team All-MVC (1957); As head coach: EPBL champion (1967); EPBL Coach of the Year (1967)

Career NBA statistics
- Points: 2,372 (6.6 ppg)
- Rebounds: 1,884 (5.2 rpg)
- Assists: 381 (1.1 apg)
- Stats at NBA.com
- Stats at Basketball Reference

Byrum William "Barney" Cable (July 29, 1935 – January 26, 2026) was an American professional basketball player. Barney Cable, a six-foot-seven forward from Rochester, Pennsylvania, was the third Bradley University player to be selected in the NBA draft.

Cable was selected by the Detroit Pistons in the second round (11th pick overall) of the 1958 NBA draft.

He played for the Pistons (1958–59), Syracuse Nationals (1959–61), Chicago Packers / Zephyrs / Baltimore Bullets (1961, 1963–64) and St. Louis Hawks (1961–63) in the National Basketball Association (NBA) for 362 games.

Cable played for the Wilmington Blue Bombers of the Eastern Professional Basketball League (EPBL) from 1964 to 1967. He won EPBL championships in 1966 and 1967. Cable also served as head coach of the Blue Bombers from 1966 to 1968. He was named the EPBL Coach of the Year in 1967. He is honored in the Greater Peoria Sports Hall of Fame.

After retirement, Cable lived in Hampstead, Maryland for 55 years. He died on January 26, 2026, at the age of 90.

== Career statistics ==
Legend
GP	Games played	GS	Games started	MPG	Minutes per game
FG%	Field goal percentage	3P%	3-point field goal percentage	FT%	Free throw percentage
RPG	Rebounds per game	APG	Assists per game	SPG	Steals per game
BPG	Blocks per game	PPG	Points per game	**Bold**	Career high

=== NBA ===
==== Regular season ====
Year	Team	GP	MPG	FG%	FT%	RPG	APG	PPG
1958–59	Detroit	31	8.7	.341	**.793**	2.8	.4	3.5
1959–60	Detroit	7	16.6	.367	.400	6.9	.9	6.9
1959–60	Syracuse	50	12.0	.378	.702	3.5	.7	4.3
1960–61	Syracuse	**75**	21.9	.463	.676	6.3	1.1	8.1
1961–62	Chicago	15	**33.2**	.378	.712	5.5	2.1	**13.7**
1961–62	St. Louis	52	26.2	.419	.623	**9.2**	1.6	10.0
1962–63	St. Louis	42	15.8	**.495**	.651	3.1	1.0	6.1
1962–63	Chicago	19	28.5	.402	.636	5.7	**2.2**	8.1
1963–64	Baltimore	71	15.8	.400	.667	4.2	.7	3.7
Career		362	18.8	.420	.665	5.2	1.1	6.6

==== Playoffs ====
Year	Team	GP	MPG	FG%	FT%	RPG	APG	PPG
1960	Syracuse	3	21.0	.357	.500	**9.3**	.3	4.7
1961	Syracuse	**8**	**23.1**	**.400**	**.588**	7.6	**.9**	**7.8**
Career		11	22.5	.392	.560	8.1	.7	6.9
