= Johnny McCarthy =

American basketball player and coach (1934–2020)

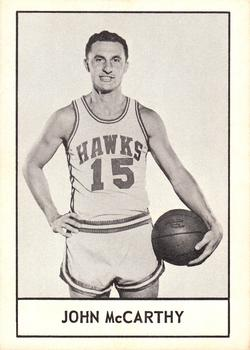

Personal information
- Born: April 25, 1934 Buffalo, New York, U.S.
- Died: May 9, 2020 (aged 86) Buffalo, New York, U.S.
- Listed height: 6 ft 1 in (1.85 m)
- Listed weight: 185 lb (84 kg)

Career information
- High school: Timon (Buffalo, New York)
- College: Canisius (1953–1956)
- NBA draft: 1956: 4th round, 24th overall pick
- Drafted by: Rochester Royals
- Playing career: 1956–1964
- Position: Point guard
- Number: 7, 26, 15, 21

Career history

Playing
- 1956–1957, 1958–1959: Rochester / Cincinnati Royals
- 1959–1962: St. Louis Hawks
- 1962–1963: Pittsburgh Rens
- 1963–1964: Boston Celtics

Coaching
- 1971–1972: Buffalo Braves
- 1974–1977: Canisius

Career highlights
- NBA champion (1964)

Career NBA statistics
- Points: 2,450 (7.8 ppg)
- Rebounds: 1,145 (3.6 rpg)
- Assists: 1,184 (3.7 apg)
- Stats at NBA.com
- Stats at Basketball Reference

John Joseph McCarthy (April 25, 1934 – May 9, 2020) was an American basketball player and coach. A 6 ft 1 in (1.85 m) point guard, he played college basketball and was an All-American at Canisius College. He was selected by the Rochester Royals in the 1956 NBA draft. He played a total of six seasons in the National Basketball Association (NBA)—two for the Royals, three for the St. Louis Hawks, and one for the Boston Celtics.

McCarthy is the first of only four players in NBA history to record a triple-double in his playoff debut, with 13 points, 11 rebounds and 11 assists against the Minneapolis Lakers on March 16, 1960; he was later joined by Magic Johnson in 1980, LeBron James in 2006 and Nikola Jokić in 2019.

McCarthy later coached the Buffalo Braves, his hometown team, for part of a season. McCarthy died on May 9, 2020.

== Career statistics ==
Legend
GP	Games played	GS	Games started	MPG	Minutes per game
FG%	Field goal percentage	3P%	3-point field goal percentage	FT%	Free throw percentage
RPG	Rebounds per game	APG	Assists per game	SPG	Steals per game
BPG	Blocks per game	PPG	Points per game	**Bold**	Career high
†	Won an NBA championship	*	Led the league

=== NBA ===
==== Regular season ====
Year	Team	GP	MPG	FG%	FT%	RPG	APG	PPG
1956–57	Rochester	72*	21.7	**.376**	**.674**	2.8	1.5	6.6
1958–59	Cincinnati	47	**38.9**	.373	.667	**4.8**	4.8	**12.9**
1959–60	St. Louis	75	31.8	.329	.659	4.0	4.4	8.4
1960–61	St. Louis	**79***	31.9	.357	.540	4.1	**5.4**	8.3
1961–62	St. Louis	15	22.2	.247	.444	3.7	4.7	3.2
1963–64†	Boston	28	7.4	.333	.385	1.3	.9	1.3
Career		316	27.9	.353	.622	3.6	3.7	7.8

==== Playoffs ====
Year	Team	GP	MPG	FG%	FT%	RPG	APG	PPG
1960	St. Louis	**14***	**40.4**	.406	**.750**	**4.6**	**7.0**	**8.1**
1961	St. Louis	12*	19.7	.345	.667	2.6	2.8	3.7
1964†	Boston	1	8.0	**1.000**	–	1.0	1.0	2.0
Career		27	30.0	.389	.733	3.6	4.9	5.9

== Head coaching record ==
Team	Year	G	W	L	W–L%	Finish	PG	PW	PL	PW–L%	Result
Buffalo	1971–72	81	22	59	.272	4th in Atlantic	—	—	—	—	Missed playoffs
Career		81	22	59	.272		0	0	0	–	
