= Dick McGuire =

American basketball player and coach (1926–2010)

Personal information
- Born: January 25, 1926 The Bronx, New York, U.S.
- Died: February 3, 2010 (aged 84) Huntington, New York, U.S.
- Listed height: 6 ft 0 in (1.83 m)
- Listed weight: 180 lb (82 kg)

Career information
- High school: La Salle Academy (New York City, New York)
- College: St. John's (1943–1944, 1946–1949); Dartmouth (1944)
- BAA draft: 1949: 1st round, 7th overall pick
- Drafted by: New York Knicks
- Playing career: 1949–1960
- Position: Point guard
- Number: 15

Career history

Playing
- 1949–1957: New York Knicks
- 1957–1960: Detroit Pistons

Career highlights
- As player: 7× NBA All-Star (1951, 1952, 1954–1956, 1958, 1959); All-NBA Second Team (1951); NBA assists leader (1950); No. 15 retired by New York Knicks; Second-team All-American – SN (1944); Third-team All-American – UPI (1949); 2× Haggerty Award (1944, 1949); As assistant coach: NBA champion (1973)

Career statistics
- Points: 5,921 (8.0 ppg)
- Rebounds: 2,784 (4.2 rpg)
- Assists: 4,205 (5.7 apg)
- Stats at NBA.com
- Stats at Basketball Reference
- Basketball Hall of Fame
- Collegiate Basketball Hall of Fame

Richard Joseph McGuire (January 26, 1926 – February 3, 2010) was an American professional basketball player and coach. McGuire was one of the premier guards of the 1950s, playing 11 seasons in the NBA (1949–60), eight with the New York Knicks and three with the Detroit Pistons. He was inducted into the Naismith Memorial Basketball Hall of Fame in 1993. His number 15 jersey was retired by the Knicks in 1992.

McGuire led the league in assists during his rookie season with a then-record 386 assists, and was among the league's top ten playmakers for ten of his 11 seasons. He was an NBA All-Star seven times (1951,'52, '54-'56, '58, '59), and was named to the All-NBA Second Team in 1951. Dave Cobert portrayed him in the 2023 movie Sweetwater.

McGuire became player-coach for the Pistons in his last season (1959–60), and coached them until 1963. He also coached the Knicks for three seasons, beginning in 1965. He compiled a 197-260 coaching record. McGuire was working as a senior consultant for the Knicks when he died on February 3, 2010, of a ruptured aortic aneurysm at age 84.

McGuire's brother Al was also a prominent figure in basketball who coached Marquette University to the 1977 NCAA basketball championship. They are the only pair of brothers inducted into the Naismith Memorial Basketball Hall of Fame. His nephew, Allie, also played in the NBA.

The Knicks retired number 15 a second time for McGuire in 1992 (six years earlier, it had been retired for Earl Monroe).

McGuire was inducted into the Suffolk Sports Hall of Fame on Long Island in the Basketball Category with the Class of 1994.

== NBA career statistics ==
Legend
GP	Games played	GS	Games started	MPG	Minutes per game
FG%	Field goal percentage	3P%	3-point field goal percentage	FT%	Free throw percentage
RPG	Rebounds per game	APG	Assists per game	SPG	Steals per game
BPG	Blocks per game	PPG	Points per game	**Bold**	Career high
*	Led the league

=== Regular season ===
Year	Team	GP	MPG	FG%	FT%	RPG	APG	PPG
1949–50	New York	68	–	.337	.652	–	5.7	8.6
1950–51	New York	64	–	.371	.649	**5.2**	6.3	8.4
1951–52	New York	64	31.5	.430	.631	**5.2**	6.1	**9.2**
1952–53	New York	61	29.2	.381	.569	4.6	4.9	7.2
1953–54	New York	68	34.5	.408	.638	4.6	5.2	9.1
1954–55	New York	71	32.5	.389	.644	4.5	**7.6**	9.1
1955–56	New York	62	27.2	.347	.637	3.5	5.8	6.9
1956–57	New York	**72**	16.5	.383	.644	2.0	3.1	5.3
1957–58	Detroit	69	33.5	.373	.667	4.2	6.6	8.1
1958–59	Detroit	71	29.1	.427	**.740**	4.0	6.2	**9.2**
1959–60	Detroit	68	21.6	**.445**	.617	3.9	5.3	7.1
Career		738	28.3	.389	.644	4.2	5.7	8.0
All-Star		7	21.6	.387	.417	3.3	5.4	4.1

=== Playoffs ===
Year	Team	GP	MPG	FG%	FT%	RPG	APG	PPG
1950	New York	5	–	.423	**.731**	–	5.4*	12.6
1951	New York	**14**	–	.313	.453	**5.9**	5.6*	5.3
1952	New York	**14**	**39.0**	.449	.570	5.1	**6.4***	10.4
1953	New York	11	32.7	.407	.636	5.7	**6.4***	7.5
1954	New York	4	17.0	.250	.600	1.0	1.3	2.8
1955	New York	3	25.0	.316	.667	3.0	4.0	6.7
1958	Detroit	7	33.7	.417	.708	4.7	5.7	9.6
1959	Detroit	3	36.3	**.625***	.636	5.7	6.3	**15.7**
1960	Detroit	2	21.0	.417	.333	2.0	4.5	5.5
Career		63	32.6	.410	.593	4.9	5.6	8.3

== Head coaching record ==
Team	Year	G	W	L	W–L%	Finish	PG	PW	PL	PW–L%	Result
Detroit	1959–60	41	17	24	.415	2nd in Western	2	0	2	.000	Lost in Division semifinals
Detroit	1960–61	79	34	45	.430	3rd in Western	5	2	3	.400	Lost in Division semifinals
Detroit	1961–62	80	37	43	.463	3rd in Western	10	5	5	.500	Lost in Division finals
Detroit	1962–63	80	34	46	.425	3rd in Western	4	1	3	.250	Lost in Division semifinals
New York	1965–66	59	24	35	.407	4th in Eastern	—	—	—	—	Missed playoffs
New York	1966–67	81	36	45	.444	4th in Eastern	4	1	3	.250	Lost in Division seminars
New York	1967–68	38	15	23	.395	left mid-season	—	—	—	—	—
Career		458	197	261	.430		25	9	16	.360	
