= 1959–60 St. Louis Hawks season =

NBA professional basketball team season

- Division champions
- Head coach: Ed Macauley
- Arena: Kiel Auditorium

Results
- Record: 46–29 (.613)
- Place: Division: 1st (Western)
- Playoff finish: NBA Finals (Eliminated 3–4)

Local media
- Television: KPLR 11
- Radio: KMOX

The 1959–1960 Saint Louis Hawks season was the 14th season for the franchise in the National Basketball Association (NBA). The Hawks claimed their 4th straight division title. They won the division by 16 games with a 46–29 record. Bob Pettit, Cliff Hagan, and Clyde Lovellette all averaged more than 20 points per game. In the Western Finals, the Hawks faced the Minneapolis Lakers and needed a win in Game 6 to stay alive. Game 6 was played in Minneapolis and the Hawks dominated the Lakers, as they won the match by 21 points to force a 7th game. In St. Louis the Hawks won 97–86 to earn a trip to the NBA Finals. The Hawks challenged the Boston Celtics for the 3rd time in 4 years. The Hawks and Celtics alternated wins as the series went to a 7th game. In Game 7 the Celtics would claim the title as Bill Russell scored 18 points in the 2nd Quarter.

== Roster ==
1959–60 St. Louis Hawks roster
Players

Pos.	No.	Player	Height	Weight	DOB	From
SG	11	Al Ferrari	6 ft 4 in (1.93 m)	190 lb (86 kg)	1933–07–06	Michigan State
C	20	Bob Ferry	6 ft 8 in (2.03 m)	230 lb (104 kg)	1937–05–31	Saint Louis
C	13	Larry Foust	6 ft 9 in (2.06 m)	215 lb (98 kg)	1928–06–24	La Salle
SF	12	Dave Gambee	6 ft 6 in (1.98 m)	215 lb (98 kg)	1937–04–16	Oregon State
PG	17	Si Green	6 ft 2 in (1.88 m)	185 lb (84 kg)	1933–08–20	Duquesne
SF	16	Cliff Hagan	6 ft 4 in (1.93 m)	210 lb (95 kg)	1931–12–09	Kentucky
C	34	Clyde Lovellette	6 ft 9 in (2.06 m)	234 lb (106 kg)	1929–09–07	Kansas
PG	22	Slater Martin	5 ft 10 in (1.78 m)	170 lb (77 kg)	1925–10–22	Texas
SG	15	Johnny McCarthy	6 ft 1 in (1.85 m)	185 lb (84 kg)	1934–04–25	Canisius
PG	21	Jack McMahon	6 ft 1 in (1.85 m)	185 lb (84 kg)	1928–12–03	St. John's
PF	9	Bob Pettit	6 ft 9 in (2.06 m)	205 lb (93 kg)	1932–12–12	LSU
SG	12 — 25	Dave Piontek	6 ft 6 in (1.98 m)	230 lb (104 kg)	1934–08–27	Xavier
SF	13	Cal Ramsey	6 ft 4 in (1.93 m)	200 lb (91 kg)	1937–07–13	NYU
C	19	Hub Reed	6 ft 9 in (2.06 m)	215 lb (98 kg)	1936–10–04	Oklahoma City
C	13	Chuck Share	6 ft 11 in (2.11 m)	235 lb (107 kg)	1927–03–14	Bowling Green

Coaches
Head coach
- Ed Macauley

Legend
- (DP) Unsigned draft pick
- (FA) Free agent
- (S) Suspended
- Injured

Roster

== Regular season ==
=== Season standings ===
Western Division	Wins	Losses	PCT	GB	Home	Road	Neutral	Division
x-St. Louis Hawks	46	29	.613	–	28–5	12–20	6–4	27–12
x-Detroit Pistons	30	45	.400	16	17–14	6–21	7–10	20–19
x-Minneapolis Lakers	25	50	.333	21	9–15	9–21	7–14	17–22
Cincinnati Royals	19	56	.253	27	9–22	2–20	8–14	14–25

=== Game log ===
1959–60 Game log
#	Date	Opponent	Score	High points	Record
1	October 24	Minneapolis	94–87	Bob Pettit (33)	0–1
2	October 31	Cincinnati	102–109	Clyde Lovellette (33)	1–1
3	November 1	@ Minneapolis	138–101	Bob Pettit (28)	2–1
4	November 3	Boston	103–98	Bob Pettit (25)	2–2
5	November 7	New York	113–117	Bob Pettit (28)	3–2
6	November 10	Minneapolis	105–134	Cliff Hagan (35)	4–2
7	November 14	@ Boston	111–113	Bob Pettit (34)	4–3
8	November 17	@ New York	97–105	Cliff Hagan (27)	4–4
9	November 20	@ Philadelphia	118–117	Bob Pettit (28)	5–4
10	November 21	Detroit	109–107	Bob Pettit (33)	5–5
11	November 22	@ Cincinnati	100–106	Bob Pettit (39)	5–6
12	November 25	@ Detroit	104–97	Bob Pettit (36)	6–6
13	November 26	Syracuse	95–112	Cliff Hagan (31)	7–6
14	November 28	Minneapolis	91–102	Bob Pettit (31)	8–6
15	December 1	N Syracuse	101–106	Bob Pettit (38)	9–6
16	December 2	@ Syracuse	121–130	Cliff Hagan (37)	9–7
17	December 4	N Philadelphia	112–124	Bob Pettit (27)	9–8
18	December 5	Philadelphia	112–113	Cliff Hagan (27)	10–8
19	December 6	@ Cincinnati	118–104	Cliff Hagan (32)	11–8
20	December 8	N Cincinnati	101–105	Cliff Hagan (30)	11–9
21	December 10	N Detroit	129–111	Cliff Hagan (31)	12–9
22	December 11	@ Boston	99–122	Hagan, Pettit (23)	12–10
23	December 13	Cincinnati	98–118	Cliff Hagan (27)	13–10
24	December 15	@ New York	119–110	Bob Pettit (40)	14–10
25	December 16	@ Detroit	107–106	Bob Pettit (32)	15–10
26	December 19	Philadelphia	89–102	Cliff Hagan (23)	16–10
27	December 20	Detroit	86–102	Cliff Hagan (21)	17–10
28	December 25	Minneapolis	96–112	Cliff Hagan (32)	18–10
29	December 26	@ Syracuse	104–117	Clyde Lovellette (23)	18–11
30	December 28	Syracuse	106–120	Cliff Hagan (28)	19–11
31	December 30	Boston	96–82	Bob Pettit (25)	19–12
32	January 1	@ Detroit	107–119	Bob Pettit (32)	19–13
33	January 2	Detroit	113–114	Cliff Hagan (34)	20–13
34	January 3	New York	108–110	Clyde Lovellette (37)	21–13
35	January 6	@ Philadelphia	101–121	Bob Pettit (24)	21–14
36	January 8	@ Cincinnati	102–112	Clyde Lovellette (25)	21–15
37	January 10	Boston	111–121	Bob Pettit (39)	22–15
38	January 12	@ Philadelphia	108–126	Cliff Hagan (26)	22–16
39	January 13	@ Boston	112–134	Clyde Lovellette (26)	22–17
40	January 14	@ Syracuse	112–119	Bob Pettit (38)	22–18
41	January 15	Syracuse	140–141 (OT)	Bob Pettit (39)	23–18
42	January 17	Minneapolis	119–135	Hagan, Pettit (34)	24–18
43	January 20	@ Cincinnati	119–108	Bob Pettit (30)	25–18
44	January 23	Cincinnati	100–108	Cliff Hagan (32)	26–18
45	January 24	New York	129–155	Clyde Lovellette (39)	27–18
46	January 26	@ New York	119–123	Bob Pettit (28)	27–19
47	January 27	@ Boston	114–127	Cliff Hagan (33)	27–20
48	January 29	Detroit	125–130 (OT)	Lovellette, Pettit (30)	28–20
49	January 30	@ Detroit	107–117	Bob Pettit (21)	28–21
50	January 31	Syracuse	110–117	Clyde Lovellette (39)	29–21
51	February 2	N Boston	114–113	Bob Pettit (32)	30–21
52	February 3	N New York	125–115	Bob Pettit (31)	31–21
53	February 5	@ Minneapolis	114–96	Bob Pettit (31)	32–21
54	February 7	Philadelphia	108–130	Bob Pettit (38)	33–21
55	February 9	New York	104–114	Bob Pettit (25)	34–21
56	February 10	@ Cincinnati	120–110	Cliff Hagan (39)	35–21
57	February 11	@ Philadelphia	120–139	Dave Piontek (20)	35–22
58	February 13	@ New York	104–122	Hagan, Lovellette (16)	35–23
59	February 14	Cincinnati	105–107	Clyde Lovellette (33)	36–23
60	February 16	@ Detroit	111–104	Cliff Hagan (26)	37–23
61	February 17	N Minneapolis	131–127	Cliff Hagan (44)	38–23
62	February 19	@ Minneapolis	101–111	Clyde Lovellette (26)	38–24
63	February 20	Boston	105–121	Bob Pettit (39)	39–24
64	February 21	N Minneapolis	98–112	Bob Pettit (31)	39–25
65	February 22	N Minneapolis	113–103	Cliff Hagan (25)	40–25
66	February 24	N Cincinnati	122–124	Clyde Lovellette (26)	40–26
67	February 25	@ Syracuse	105–110	Cliff Hagan (33)	40–27
68	February 27	Detroit	116–114	Clyde Lovellette (34)	40–28
69	February 28	Cincinnati	105–122	Cliff Hagan (39)	41–28
70	March 1	Minneapolis	101–109	Cliff Hagan (33)	42–28
71	March 2	@ Detroit	100–116	Cliff Hagan (25)	42–29
72	March 5	@ Minneapolis	107–106 (OT)	Bob Pettit (41)	43–29
73	March 6	Philadelphia	109–128	Cliff Hagan (29)	44–29
74	March 8	Detroit	101–122	Bob Pettit (34)	45–29
75	March 9	@ Cincinnati	123–116	Cliff Hagan (33)	46–29

== Playoffs ==
1960 playoff game log
Division Finals: 4–3 (home: 2–2; road: 2–1)

Game	Date	Team	Score	High points	High rebounds	Location Attendance	Series
1	March 16	Minneapolis	W 112–99	Cliff Hagan (29)	Bob Pettit (19)	Kiel Auditorium; 8,377	1–0
2	March 17	Minneapolis	L 113–120	Clyde Lovellette (30)	Bob Pettit (15)	Kiel Auditorium; 8,614	1–1
3	March 19	@ Minneapolis	W 93–89	Bob Pettit (35)	—	Minneapolis Armory	2–1
4	March 20	@ Minneapolis	L 101–103	Cliff Hagan (28)	Clyde Lovellette (15)	Minneapolis Armory; 6,852	2–2
5	March 22	Minneapolis	L 110–117 (OT)	Bob Pettit (25)	Bob Pettit (19)	Kiel Auditorium; 10,043	2–3
6	March 24	@ Minneapolis	W 117–96	Bob Pettit (30)	Bob Pettit (18)	Minneapolis Armory	3–3
7	March 26	Minneapolis	W 97–86	Bob Pettit (28)	Bob Pettit (20)	Kiel Auditorium; 6,195	4–3

NBA Finals: 3–4 (home: 2–1; road: 1–3)

Game	Date	Team	Score	High points	High rebounds	High assists	Location Attendance	Series
1	March 27	@ Boston	L 122–140	Cliff Hagan (25)	Bob Pettit (17)	Johnny McCarthy (6)	Boston Garden; 10,002	0–1
2	March 29	@ Boston	W 113–103	Bob Pettit (35)	Bob Pettit (22)	Bob Pettit (7)	Boston Garden; 13,909	1–1
3	April 2	Boston	L 86–102	Bob Pettit (23)	Bob Pettit (18)	Green, Lovellette (6)	Kiel Auditorium; 10,612	1–2
4	April 3	Boston	W 106–96	Bob Pettit (32)	Bob Pettit (11)	Johnny McCarthy (8)	Kiel Auditorium; 10,612	2–2
5	April 5	@ Boston	L 102–127	Cliff Hagan (28)	Cliff Hagan (12)	Si Green (8)	Boston Garden; 13,909	2–3
6	April 7	Boston	W 105–102	Cliff Hagan (36)	Clyde Lovellette (15)	Johnny McCarthy (9)	Kiel Auditorium; 10,612	3–3
7	April 9	@ Boston	L 103–122	Bob Pettit (22)	Bob Pettit (14)	Si Green (5)	Boston Garden; 13,909	3–4

1960 schedule

== Awards and honors ==
- Bob Pettit, All-NBA First Team
