= 1959–60 Syracuse Nationals season =

Season for the Nationals in the National Basketball Association

- Head coach: Paul Seymour
- Arena: Onondaga War Memorial

Results
- Record: 45–30 (.600)
- Place: Division: 3rd (Eastern)
- Playoff finish: East Division Semifinals (eliminated 1–2)
- Stats at Basketball Reference

Local media
- Television: WSYR-TV
- Radio: WSYR

The 1959–60 Syracuse Nationals season was the Nationals' 11th season in the NBA.

== Roster ==
1959-60 Syracuse Nationals roster
Players

Pos.	No.	Player	Height	Weight	DOB	From
G/F	5	Dick Barnett	6 ft 4 in (1.93 m)	190 lb (86 kg)	1936-10-02	Tennessee State
G	24	Al Bianchi	6 ft 3 in (1.91 m)	185 lb (84 kg)	1932-03-26	Bowling Green
F	23	Barney Cable	6 ft 7 in (2.01 m)	175 lb (79 kg)	1935-07-29	Bradley
G	21	Larry Costello	6 ft 1 in (1.85 m)	185 lb (84 kg)	1931-07-02	Niagara
G/F	8	Connie Dierking	6 ft 9 in (2.06 m)	222 lb (101 kg)	1936-10-02	Cincinnati
G/F	15	Hal Greer	6 ft 2 in (1.88 m)	175 lb (79 kg)	1936-06-26	Marshall
G/F	9	Bob Hopkins	6 ft 8 in (2.03 m)	205 lb (93 kg)	1934-11-03	Grambling State
F/C	10	Johnny Kerr	6 ft 9 in (2.06 m)	230 lb (104 kg)	1932-08-17	Illinois
G/F	17	Togo Palazzi	6 ft 4 in (1.93 m)	205 lb (93 kg)	1932-08-08	Holy Cross
G	3	Jim Ray	6 ft 0 in (1.83 m)	180 lb (82 kg)	1934-01-12	Toledo
F/C	4	Dolph Schayes	6 ft 7 in (2.01 m)	195 lb (88 kg)	1928-05-19	NYU
G/F	11	Frank Selvy	6 ft 2 in (1.88 m)	180 lb (82 kg)	1932-11-09	Furman
G/F	5	Paul Seymour	6 ft 1 in (1.85 m)	180 lb (82 kg)	1928-01-30	Toledo
G/F	12	George Yardley	6 ft 5 in (1.96 m)	190 lb (86 kg)	1928-11-03	Stanford

Coaches
Head coach

Paul Seymour

Legend
- (DP) Unsigned draft pick
- (FA) Free agent
- (S) Suspended
- Injured

Roster

== Regular season ==
=== Season standings ===
Eastern Division	W	L	PCT	GB	Home	Road	Neutral	Div
x-Boston Celtics	59	16	.787	–	25–2	24–9	10–5	28–11
x-Philadelphia Warriors	49	26	.653	10	22–6	12–19	15–1	22–17
x-Syracuse Nationals	45	30	.600	14	25–4	12–19	8–7	21–18
New York Knicks	27	48	.360	32	13–18	9–19	5–11	7–32

x – clinched playoff spot

=== Game log ===
1959–60 Game log
#	Date	Opponent	Score	High points	Record
1	October 24	Boston	L 109–121	George Yardley (26)	0–1
2	October 28	@ Detroit	L 102–117	Hal Greer (22)	0–2
3	October 30	@ Cincinnati	W 136–127	Larry Costello (29)	1–2
4	October 31	Minneapolis	W 117–108	George Yardley (31)	2–2
5	November 4	@ Philadelphia	L 113–124	Johnny Kerr (20)	2–3
6	November 7	N Cincinnati	101–103	Dolph Schayes (25)	2–4
7	November 8	Detroit	107–118	Dolph Schayes (28)	3–4
8	November 12	@ New York	113–104	George Yardley (23)	4–4
9	November 14	New York	108–116	George Yardley (27)	5–4
10	November 17	N Cincinnati	121–116	Dolph Schayes (30)	6–4
11	November 18	Boston	103–138	Dolph Schayes (32)	7–4
12	November 20	@ Boston	101–114	George Yardley (24)	7–5
13	November 21	Philadelphia	107–116	Hal Greer (28)	8–5
14	November 22	N Philadelphia	103–114	Larry Costello (22)	8–6
15	November 24	@ New York	120–107	Johnny Kerr (22)	9–6
16	November 25	@ Minneapolis	100–93	Johnny Kerr (23)	10–6
17	November 26	@ St. Louis	95–112	George Yardley (19)	10–7
18	November 28	@ Cincinnati	111–105	Dolph Schayes (32)	11–7
19	December 1	N St. Louis	101–106	George Yardley (24)	11–8
20	December 2	St. Louis	121–130	Hal Greer (29)	12–8
21	December 5	Minneapolis	95–108	Schayes, Yardley (24)	13–8
22	December 8	N Minneapolis	93–89	George Yardley (20)	14–8
23	December 9	N Minneapolis	86–96	Johnny Kerr (15)	14–9
24	December 11	@ New York	121–152	Dick Barnett (19)	14–10
25	December 13	Philadelphia	121–150	Johnny Kerr (36)	15–10
26	December 16	New York	113–116	Johnny Kerr (26)	16–10
27	December 19	@ Detroit	112–120	Dolph Schayes (22)	16–11
28	December 20	Boston	132–127	Dolph Schayes (32)	16–12
29	December 25	N Philadelphia	121–129	Dick Barnett (27)	16–13
30	December 26	St. Louis	104–117	Dolph Schayes (31)	17–13
31	December 28	@ St. Louis	106–120	Dick Barnett (24)	17–14
32	December 30	@ Cincinnati	131–127	Dolph Schayes (36)	18–14
33	January 1	@ Minneapolis	109–98	George Yardley (29)	19–14
34	January 3	Boston	113–114	George Yardley (26)	20–14
35	January 4	@ Boston	120–127	Dolph Schayes (26)	20–15
36	January 5	N Boston	145–143 (OT)	Hal Greer (24)	21–15
37	January 7	Cincinnati	114–132	George Yardley (24)	22–15
38	January 8	N Detroit	118–107	George Yardley (30)	23–15
39	January 9	@ Philadelphia	112–119	George Yardley (29)	23–16
40	January 10	Detroit	103–108	George Yardley (27)	24–16
41	January 12	N Boston	127–120	George Yardley (47)	25–16
42	January 13	N Philadelphia	131–132 (OT)	Dolph Schayes (25)	25–17
43	January 14	St. Louis	112–119	Dolph Schayes (29)	26–17
44	January 15	@ St. Louis	140–141 (OT)	Dolph Schayes (34)	26–18
45	January 17	New York	117–129	Larry Costello (31)	27–18
46	January 20	Philadelphia	129–123	Dolph Schayes (26)	27–19
47	January 23	@ Boston	121–130	Barnett, Yardley (20)	27–20
48	January 24	Boston	131–110	George Yardley (29)	27–21
49	January 26	N Detroit	114–121	George Yardley (30)	27–22
50	January 27	@ Detroit	144–108	Dolph Schayes (30)	28–22
51	January 29	@ Minneapolis	119–112	Johnny Kerr (26)	29–22
52	January 31	@ St. Louis	110–117	Johnny Kerr (38)	29–23
53	February 2	@ New York	119–102	Dolph Schayes (24)	30–23
54	February 4	Philadelphia	110–137	Dick Barnett (25)	31–23
55	February 5	@ Boston	100–124	Barnett, Yardley (19)	31–24
56	February 6	@ Philadelphia	126–129	Dolph Schayes (39)	31–25
57	February 7	Cincinnati	112–135	Dolph Schayes (21)	32–25
58	February 9	N Cincinnati	117–111	Dolph Schayes (29)	33–25
59	February 10	N Minneapolis	110–109	George Yardley (30)	34–25
60	February 11	New York	109–116	Dolph Schayes (33)	35–25
61	February 14	Minneapolis	119–121	George Yardley (31)	36–25
62	February 16	@ New York	116–125	Dolph Schayes (26)	36–26
63	February 17	@ Philadelphia	116–123	Dick Barnett (22)	36–27
64	February 18	Philadelphia	122–136	Dolph Schayes (31)	37–27
65	February 20	N New York	126–121	Barnett, Schayes (23)	38–27
66	February 21	Detroit	120–122	George Yardley (26)	39–27
67	February 23	@ Cincinnati	133–135	Dolph Schayes (33)	39–28
68	February 24	@ Detroit	110–128	Bob Hopkins (18)	39–29
69	February 25	St. Louis	105–110	Dolph Schayes (27)	40–29
70	February 27	New York	111–114	Hal Greer (25)	41–29
71	March 1	@ New York	124–121	Dolph Schayes (27)	42–29
72	March 3	Boston	108–149	Dolph Schayes (29)	43–29
73	March 5	New York	115–132	Dick Barnett (22)	44–29
74	March 6	@ Boston	117–126	Dolph Schayes (34)	44–30
75	March 9	Philadelphia	126–137	Larry Costello (24)	45–30

== Playoffs ==
1960 playoff game log
Division Semifinals: 1–2 (home: 1–0; road: 0–2)

Game	Date	Team	Score	High points	High rebounds	High assists	Location	Series
1	March 11	@ Philadelphia	L 92–115	Dick Barnett (19)	Barney Cable (13)	Larry Costello (4)	Philadelphia Civic Center	0–1
2	March 13	Philadelphia	W 125–119	Dolph Schayes (40)	Dolph Schayes (22)	Larry Costello (9)	Onondaga War Memorial	1–1
3	March 14	@ Philadelphia	L 112–132	Dolph Schayes (31)	Dolph Schayes (14)	Larry Costello (7)	Philadelphia Civic Center	1–2

1960 schedule

== Awards and records ==
- Dolph Schayes, All-NBA Second Team
