= 1959–60 New York Knicks season =

Season of National Basketball Association team the New York Knicks

- Head coach: Andrew Levane; Carl Braun
- General manager: Fred Podesta; Vince Boryla
- Arena: Madison Square Garden

Results
- Record: 27–48 (.360)
- Place: Division: 4th (Eastern)
- Playoff finish: Did not qualify
- Stats at Basketball Reference

Local media
- Television: WPIX
- Radio: WINS

The 1959–60 New York Knicks season was the Knicks' 14th season in the NBA.

== Regular season ==
=== Season standings ===
Eastern Division	W	L	PCT	GB	Home	Road	Neutral	Div
x-Boston Celtics	59	16	.787	–	25–2	24–9	10–5	28–11
x-Philadelphia Warriors	49	26	.653	10	22–6	12–19	15–1	22–17
x-Syracuse Nationals	45	30	.600	14	25–4	12–19	8–7	21–18
New York Knicks	27	48	.360	32	13–18	9–19	5–11	7–32

x – clinched playoff spot

=== Game log ===
1959–60 game log
#	Date	Opponent	Score	High points	Record
1	October 24	Philadelphia	118–109	Ken Sears (35)	0–1
2	October 31	Boston	123–109	Richie Guerin (25)	0–2
3	November 3	N Minneapolis	99–93	Richie Guerin (35)	1–2
4	November 4	@ Detroit	107–101	Richie Guerin (27)	2–2
5	November 7	@ St. Louis	113–117	Guerin, Naulls (26)	2–3
6	November 10	@ Philadelphia	125–126	Naulls, Sobieszczyk (26)	2–4
7	November 12	Syracuse	113–104	Richie Guerin (22)	2–5
8	November 14	@ Syracuse	108–116	Jack George (20)	2–6
9	November 15	Detroit	103–94	Willie Naulls (19)	2–7
10	November 17	St. Louis	97–105	Ken Sears (25)	3–7
11	November 18	@ Minneapolis	106–105	Willie Naulls (23)	4–7
12	November 19	@ Cincinnati	130–109	Richie Guerin (25)	5–7
13	November 21	Boston	128–127	Guerin, Naulls, Sears (23)	5–8
14	November 22	@ Detroit	104–115	Willie Naulls (23)	5–9
15	November 24	Syracuse	120–107	Ken Sears (29)	5–10
16	November 28	Philadelphia	109–108	Carl Braun (25)	5–11
17	November 29	@ Philadelphia	127–126	Willie Naulls (30)	6–11
18	December 1	Minneapolis	103–100	Ken Sears (28)	6–12
19	December 2	N Cincinnati	118–135	Richie Guerin (29)	6–13
20	December 4	@ Boston	107–122	Willie Naulls (30)	6–14
21	December 5	Detroit	108–124	Willie Naulls (22)	7–14
22	December 8	Boston	121–105	Naulls, Sears (22)	7–15
23	December 11	Syracuse	121–152	Richie Guerin (57)	8–15
24	December 13	@ Detroit	129–147	Richie Guerin (28)	8–16
25	December 15	St. Louis	119–110	Richie Guerin (30)	8–17
26	December 16	@ Syracuse	113–116	Richie Guerin (30)	8–18
27	December 17	N Boston	126–137	Richie Guerin (42)	8–19
28	December 19	@ Boston	116–119	Ken Sears (25)	8–20
29	December 20	Cincinnati	118–132	Willie Naulls (28)	9–20
30	December 22	N Cincinnati	127–119	George, Sears (24)	10–20
31	December 25	Boston	123–119	Richie Guerin (26)	10–21
32	December 26	@ Philadelphia	122–116	Richie Guerin (28)	11–21
33	December 30	N Detroit	124–109	Willie Naulls (31)	12–21
34	December 31	Minneapolis	102–127	Richie Guerin (24)	13–21
35	January 2	@ Cincinnati	126–118	Richie Guerin (32)	14–21
36	January 3	@ St. Louis	108–110	Ken Sears (28)	14–22
37	January 5	Detroit	110–121	Willie Naulls (26)	15–22
38	January 6	N Cincinnati	113–129	Carl Braun (25)	15–23
39	January 10	Philadelphia	116–103	Charlie Tyra (25)	15–24
40	January 12	@ Cincinnati	141–123	Willie Naulls (25)	16–24
41	January 13	N Detroit	113–114	Richie Guerin (34)	16–25
42	January 14	N Minneapolis	131–126	Willie Naulls (36)	17–25
43	January 16	Cincinnati	106–132	Willie Naulls (23)	18–25
44	January 17	@ Syracuse	117–129	Willie Naulls (26)	18–26
45	January 19	N Philadelphia	114–93	Richie Guerin (20)	18–27
46	January 20	@ Boston	126–144	Willie Naulls (33)	18–28
47	January 23	@ Minneapolis	115–104	Ken Sears (30)	19–28
48	January 24	@ St. Louis	129–155	Ken Sears (26)	19–29
49	January 26	St. Louis	119–123	Naulls, Sears (30)	20–29
50	January 27	N Philadelphia	129–117	Richie Guerin (35)	20–30
51	January 29	N Cincinnati	128–113	Ken Sears (24)	21–30
52	January 30	Philadelphia	108–115	Willie Naulls (27)	22–30
53	February 2	Syracuse	119–102	Willie Naulls (30)	22–31
54	February 3	N St. Louis	125–115	Richie Guerin (32)	22–32
55	February 6	Boston	143–117	Richie Guerin (27)	22–33
56	February 7	@ Boston	142–135	Ken Sears (39)	23–33
57	February 9	@ St. Louis	104–114	Guerin, Tyra (22)	23–34
58	February 10	Philadelphia	117–125	Richie Guerin (38)	24–34
59	February 11	@ Syracuse	109–116	Charlie Tyra (24)	24–35
60	February 13	St. Louis	104–122	Willie Naulls (27)	25–35
61	February 16	Syracuse	116–125	Dick Garmaker (33)	26–35
62	February 18	N Boston	104–109	Ken Sears (19)	26–36
63	February 20	N Syracuse	126–121	Willie Naulls (25)	26–37
64	February 21	Philadelphia	129–122	Richie Guerin (41)	26–38
65	February 23	Minneapolis	117–112	Charlie Tyra (27)	26–39
66	February 25	@ Philadelphia	121–131	Jim Palmer (27)	26–40
67	February 27	@ Syracuse	111–114	Sears, Tyra (22)	26–41
68	February 28	Boston	129–125	Richie Guerin (39)	26–42
69	March 1	Syracuse	124–121	Jim Palmer (23)	26–43
70	March 2	N Minneapolis	113–123	Richie Guerin (28)	26–44
71	March 4	N Philadelphia	136–134 (OT)	Willie Naulls (23)	26–45
72	March 5	@ Syracuse	115–132	Willie Naulls (28)	26–46
73	March 6	Detroit	112–120	Dick Garmaker (30)	27–46
74	March 9	@ Boston	128–148	Willie Naulls (29)	27–47
75	March 10	@ Minneapolis	108–133	Willie Naulls (25)	27–48

== Awards and records ==
- Richie Guerin, All-NBA Second Team
