= 1959–60 Minneapolis Lakers season =

NBA professional basketball team season

- Head coach: John Castellani; Jim Pollard
- Arena: Minneapolis Armory

Results
- Record: 25–50 (.333)
- Place: Division: 3rd (Western)
- Playoff finish: Division finals (lost to Hawks 3–4)
- Stats at Basketball Reference

Local media
- Television: KSTP-TV
- Radio: WLOL

The 1959–60 Minneapolis Lakers season was the 12th season for the franchise in the NBA and final season in Minneapolis. The Lakers finished in third-place in the NBA Western Division with a record of 25–50, 21 games behind the St. Louis Hawks. In their final season in the Twin Cities, the Lakers made the playoffs and defeated the Detroit Pistons two games to none in the Western Division semifinals, before losing the West Finals to the Hawks, four games to three. The Lakers roster had five 1st overall picks: Elgin Baylor, Hot Rod Hundley, Chuck Share, Ray Felix, and Frank Selvy, the most among any NBA teams in a season.

On January 18, the team had a harrowing flight in a snowstorm, returning to Minneapolis from St. Louis. The team's DC-3 had electrical problems and made an emergency landing in a cornfield near Carroll, Iowa.

On April 27, 1960, the NBA approved the relocation of the Lakers to Southern California and they became the Los Angeles Lakers for the 1960–61 season.

== Roster ==
1959–60 Minneapolis Lakers roster
Players

| Pos. | No. | Player | Height | Weight | DOB | From |
|---|---|---|---|---|---|---|
| SF | 22 | Elgin Baylor | 6 ft 5 in (1.96 m) | 225 lb (102 kg) | 1934–09–16 | Seattle |
| PF | 12, 23 | Boo Ellis | 6 ft 5 in (1.96 m) | 185 lb (84 kg) | 1936-12-11 | Niagra |
| C | 14 | Ray Felix | 6 ft 11 in (2.11 m) | 220 lb (100 kg) | 1930-12-10 | Long Island |
| SG | 50 | Ed Fleming | 6 ft 3 in (1.91 m) | 189 lb (86 kg) | 1933–07–25 | Niagra |
| C | 14 | Larry Foust | 6 ft 9 in (2.06 m) | 215 lb (98 kg) | 1928–06–24 | La Salle |
| SG | 16 | Dick Garmaker | 6 ft 3 in (1.91 m) | 200 lb (91 kg) | 1932-10-29 | Minnesota |
| SF | 30 | Steve Hamilton | 6 ft 6 in (1.98 m) | 190 lb (86 kg) | 1934–11–30 | Morehead State |
| SF | 20 | Tom Hawkins | 6 ft 5 in (1.96 m) | 210 lb (95 kg) | 1936-12-22 | Notre Dame |
| PG | 33 | Hot Rod Hundley | 6 ft 4 in (1.93 m) | 185 lb (84 kg) | 1934–10–26 | West Virginia |
| C | 32 | Jim Krebs | 6 ft 8 in (2.03 m) | 230 lb (104 kg) | 1935–09–08 | SMU |
| PF | 35 | Rudy LaRusso | 6 ft 7 in (2.01 m) | 220 lb (100 kg) | 1937-11-11 | Dartmouth |
| PG | 21 | Bobby Leonard | 6 ft 3 in (1.91 m) | 185 lb (84 kg) | 1932–09–17 | Indiana |
| SG | 16 | Nick Mantis | 6 ft 3 in (1.91 m) | 190 lb (86 kg) | 1935-12-07 | Northwestern |
| SG | 70 | Frank Selvy | 6 ft 3 in (1.91 m) | 180 lb (82 kg) | 1932-11-09 | Furman |
| C | 44 | Chuck Share | 6 ft 11 in (2.11 m) | 235 lb (107 kg) | 1927-03-14 | Bowling Green |
| G | 24 | Bobby Smith | 6 ft 4 in (1.93 m) | 190 lb (86 kg) | 1937-08-20 | West Virginia |
| PG | 17 | Ron Sobieszczyk | 6 ft 3 in (1.91 m) | 185 lb (84 kg) | 1934-09-21 | DePaul |

Coaches
Head coach
- John Castellani / Jim Pollard

Legend
- (DP) Unsigned draft pick
- (FA) Free agent
- (S) Suspended
- Injured

Roster

== Regular season ==
=== Season standings ===
| Western Division | Wins | Losses | PCT | GB | Home | Road | Neutral | Division |
|---|---|---|---|---|---|---|---|---|
| x-St. Louis Hawks | 46 | 29 | .613 | – | 28–5 | 12–20 | 6–4 | 27–12 |
| x-Detroit Pistons | 30 | 45 | .400 | 16 | 17–14 | 6–21 | 7–10 | 20–19 |
| x-Minneapolis Lakers | 25 | 50 | .333 | 21 | 9–15 | 9–21 | 7–14 | 17–22 |
| Cincinnati Royals | 19 | 56 | .253 | 27 | 9–22 | 2–20 | 8–14 | 14–25 |

x – clinched playoff spot

=== Game log ===
| # | Date | Opponent | Score | High points | Record |
| 1 | October 18 | Detroit | 106–105 | Elgin Baylor (52) | 0–1 |
| 2 | October 24 | @ St. Louis | 94–87 | Dick Garmaker (27) | 1–1 |
| 3 | October 25 | @ Cincinnati | 102–103 | Elgin Baylor (30) | 1–2 |
| 4 | October 31 | @ Syracuse | 108–117 | Elgin Baylor (30) | 1–3 |
| 5 | November 1 | St. Louis | 138–101 | Elgin Baylor (27) | 1–4 |
| 6 | November 3 | N New York | 99–93 | Elgin Baylor (28) | 1–5 |
| 7 | November 6 | Detroit | 118–113 (2OT) | Elgin Baylor (33) | 1–6 |
| 8 | November 7 | @ Detroit | 113–111 (OT) | Elgin Baylor (40) | 2–6 |
| 9 | November 8 | Boston | 115–136 | Elgin Baylor (64) | 3–6 |
| 10 | November 10 | @ St. Louis | 105–134 | Elgin Baylor (37) | 3–7 |
| 11 | November 12 | N Detroit | 93–107 | Elgin Baylor (33) | 3–8 |
| 12 | November 14 | @ Philadelphia | 98–104 | Elgin Baylor (27) | 3–9 |
| 13 | November 15 | N Philadelphia | 100–106 | Dick Garmaker (23) | 4–9 |
| 14 | November 18 | New York | 106–105 | Elgin Baylor (20) | 4–10 |
| 15 | November 20 | Detroit | 85–105 | Rudy LaRusso (24) | 5–10 |
| 16 | November 21 | @ Cincinnati | 99–93 (OT) | Dick Garmaker (26) | 6–10 |
| 17 | November 25 | Syracuse | 100–93 | Larry Foust (21) | 6–11 |
| 18 | November 26 | @ Cincinnati | 95–114 | Hot Rod Hundley (24) | 6–12 |
| 19 | November 28 | @ St. Louis | 91–102 | Rudy LaRusso (18) | 6–13 |
| 20 | November 29 | N Boston | 109–93 | Hot Rod Hundley (18) | 6–14 |
| 21 | December 1 | @ New York | 103–100 | Elgin Baylor (20) | 7–14 |
| 22 | December 3 | @ Philadelphia | 109–123 | Rudy LaRusso (24) | 7–15 |
| 23 | December 4 | @ Detroit | 101–120 | Elgin Baylor (28) | 7–16 |
| 24 | December 5 | @ Syracuse | 95–108 | Elgin Baylor (35) | 7–17 |
| 25 | December 6 | Boston | 121–104 | Elgin Baylor (29) | 7–18 |
| 26 | December 8 | N Syracuse | 93–89 | Rudy LaRusso (22) | 7–19 |
| 27 | December 9 | N Syracuse | 86–96 | Elgin Baylor (29) | 8–19 |
| 28 | December 12 | Cincinnati | 107–97 | Dick Garmaker (29) | 8–20 |
| 29 | December 19 | @ Cincinnati | 131–113 | Baylor, Leonard (25) | 9–20 |
| 30 | December 25 | @ St. Louis | 96–112 | Elgin Baylor (23) | 9–21 |
| 31 | December 26 | @ Detroit | 108–105 | Elgin Baylor (28) | 10–21 |
| 32 | December 27 | Detroit | 109–119 | Elgin Baylor (28) | 11–21 |
| 33 | December 28 | @ Boston | 104–107 | Elgin Baylor (29) | 11–22 |
| 34 | December 30 | @ Philadelphia | 107–122 | Elgin Baylor (22) | 11–23 |
| 35 | December 31 | @ New York | 102–127 | Elgin Baylor (26) | 11–24 |
| 36 | January 1 | Syracuse | 109–98 | Tom Hawkins (20) | 11–25 |
| 37 | January 5 | N Philadelphia | 126–111 | Hot Rod Hundley (24) | 11–26 |
| 38 | January 9 | Cincinnati | 91–121 | Elgin Baylor (28) | 12–26 |
| 39 | January 10 | @ Cincinnati | 112–106 | Larry Foust (30) | 13–26 |
| 40 | January 14 | N New York | 131–126 | Elgin Baylor (26) | 13–27 |
| 41 | January 15 | @ Cincinnati | 118–122 | Elgin Baylor (43) | 13–28 |
| 42 | January 16 | N Detroit | 98–105 | Elgin Baylor (29) | 13–29 |
| 43 | January 17 | @ St. Louis | 119–135 | Elgin Baylor (43) | 13–30 |
| 44 | January 23 | New York | 115–104 | Elgin Baylor (30) | 13–31 |
| 45 | January 27 | N Cincinnati | 116–112 | Elgin Baylor (34) | 14–31 |
| 46 | January 29 | Syracuse | 119–112 | Elgin Baylor (34) | 14–32 |
| 47 | January 31 | N Philadelphia | 114–104 | Elgin Baylor (21) | 14–33 |
| 48 | February 1 | N Philadelphia | 103–96 | Elgin Baylor (36) | 14–34 |
| 49 | February 3 | @ Boston | 108–128 | Elgin Baylor (24) | 14–35 |
| 50 | February 5 | St. Louis | 114–96 | Elgin Baylor (36) | 14–36 |
| 51 | February 6 | @ Detroit | 101–116 | Elgin Baylor (34) | 14–37 |
| 52 | February 7 | Detroit | 102–104 | Elgin Baylor (26) | 15–37 |
| 53 | February 9 | N Boston | 90–129 | Elgin Baylor (23) | 15–38 |
| 54 | February 10 | N Syracuse | 110–109 | Elgin Baylor (37) | 15–39 |
| 55 | February 11 | Cincinnati | 111–108 | Elgin Baylor (32) | 15–40 |
| 56 | February 13 | @ Detroit | 123–117 (OT) | Elgin Baylor (37) | 16–40 |
| 57 | February 14 | @ Syracuse | 119–121 | Elgin Baylor (26) | 16–41 |
| 58 | February 16 | N Boston | 122–130 | Elgin Baylor (40) | 16–42 |
| 59 | February 17 | N St. Louis | 131–127 | Elgin Baylor (38) | 16–43 |
| 60 | February 19 | St. Louis | 101–111 | Elgin Baylor (28) | 17–43 |
| 61 | February 20 | @ Philadelphia | 106–122 | Elgin Baylor (32) | 17–44 |
| 62 | February 21 | N St. Louis | 98–112 | Elgin Baylor (35) | 18–44 |
| 63 | February 22 | N St. Louis | 113–103 | Rudy LaRusso (24) | 18–45 |
| 64 | February 23 | @ New York | 117–112 | Elgin Baylor (41) | 19–45 |
| 65 | February 24 | N Boston | 110–131 | Rudy LaRusso (27) | 19–46 |
| 66 | February 25 | N Cincinnati | 105–95 | Elgin Baylor (31) | 20–46 |
| 67 | February 26 | @ Boston | 111–128 | Elgin Baylor (28) | 20–47 |
| 68 | February 27 | Philadelphia | 91–109 | Elgin Baylor (23) | 21–47 |
| 69 | March 1 | @ St. Louis | 101–109 | Elgin Baylor (27) | 21–48 |
| 70 | March 2 | N New York | 113–123 | Elgin Baylor (48) | 22–48 |
| 71 | March 3 | N Cincinnati | 117–114 | Elgin Baylor (23) | 23–48 |
| 72 | March 5 | St. Louis | 107–106 (OT) | Elgin Baylor (35) | 23–49 |
| 73 | March 6 | Cincinnati | 105–114 | Elgin Baylor (43) | 24–49 |
| 74 | March 9 | @ Detroit | 116–117 | Elgin Baylor (31) | 24–50 |
| 75 | March 10 | New York | 108–133 | Elgin Baylor (37) | 25–50 |

== Playoffs ==
1960 playoff game log
Division semifinals: 2–0 (home: 1–0; road: 1–0)

| Game | Date | Team | Score | High points | Location | Series |
|---|---|---|---|---|---|---|
| 1 | March 12 | @ Detroit | W 113–112 | Elgin Baylor (40) | Grosse Pointe High School | 1–0 |
| 2 | March 13 | Detroit | W 114–99 | Frank Selvy (30) | Minneapolis Armory | 2–0 |

Division finals: 3–4 (home: 1–2; road: 2–2)

| Game | Date | Team | Score | High points | High rebounds | Location Attendance | Series |
|---|---|---|---|---|---|---|---|
| 1 | March 16 | @ St. Louis | L 99–112 | Elgin Baylor (19) | Baylor, Hundley (9) | Kiel Auditorium; 8,377 | 0–1 |
| 2 | March 17 | @ St. Louis | W 120–113 | Elgin Baylor (40) | Elgin Baylor (14) | Kiel Auditorium; 8,614 | 1–1 |
| 3 | March 19 | St. Louis | L 89–93 | Elgin Baylor (27) | — | Minneapolis Armory | 1–2 |
| 4 | March 20 | St. Louis | W 103–101 | Elgin Baylor (39) | Elgin Baylor (16) | Minneapolis Armory; 6,852 | 2–2 |
| 5 | March 22 | @ St. Louis | W 117–110 (OT) | Elgin Baylor (40) | Elgin Baylor (18) | Kiel Auditorium; 10,043 | 3–2 |
| 6 | March 24 | St. Louis | L 96–117 | Elgin Baylor (38) | Frank Selvy (12) | Minneapolis Armory | 3–3 |
| 7 | March 26 | @ St. Louis | L 86–97 | Elgin Baylor (33) | Elgin Baylor (13) | Kiel Auditorium; 6,195 | 3–4 |

1960 schedule

== Awards and records ==
- Elgin Baylor, All-NBA First Team
- Elgin Baylor, NBA All-Star Game
- Dick Garmaker, NBA All-Star Game
- Rod Hundley, NBA All-Star Game
