= 1959–60 Philadelphia Warriors season =

NBA professional basketball team season

- Head coach: Neil Johnston
- General manager: Eddie Gottlieb
- Owner: Eddie Gottlieb
- Arena: Philadelphia Civic Center

Results
- Record: 49–26 (.653)
- Place: Division: 2nd (Eastern)
- Playoff finish: Division finals (lost to Celtics 2–4)
- Stats at Basketball Reference

Local media
- Television: WPTZ; WCAU; WFIL
- Radio: WIBG (Bill Campbell)

The 1959–60 Philadelphia Warriors season was the Warriors' 14th season in the NBA.

Overbrook High School phenom Wilt Chamberlain joined the Warriors. He would have an immediate impact as he won the Rookie of the Year Award and the NBA Most Valuable Player. He led the league in scoring and rebounds. He averaged 37.6 points per game and 27.0 rebounds per game. The Warriors finished in 2nd place with a 49–26 record. In the playoffs, the Warriors played the Syracuse Nationals. The Warriors beat them 2 games to 1. In the Eastern Finals, Chamberlain was matched against Bill Russell of the Boston Celtics. In the end, Boston would emerge victorious in 6 games.

== Roster ==
1959–60 Philadelphia Warriors roster
Players

Pos.	No.	Player	Height	Weight	DOB	From
F	11	Paul Arizin	6 ft 4 in (1.93 m)	190 lb (86 kg)		Villanova
G	7	Ernie Beck	6 ft 4 in (1.93 m)	190 lb (86 kg)		Penn
C	13	Wilt Chamberlain	7 ft 1 in (2.16 m)	275 lb (125 kg)		Kansas
G/F	15	Tom Gola	6 ft 6 in (1.98 m)	205 lb (93 kg)		La Salle
F/C	9	Joe Graboski	6 ft 7 in (2.01 m)	195 lb (88 kg)		Tuley HS (IL)
G	52	Vern Hatton	6 ft 3 in (1.91 m)	195 lb (88 kg)		Kentucky
F	12	Andy Johnson	6 ft 5 in (1.96 m)	215 lb (98 kg)		Portland
G	5	Guy Rodgers	6 ft 0 in (1.83 m)	185 lb (84 kg)		Temple
F	17	Joe Ruklick	6 ft 9 in (2.06 m)	220 lb (100 kg)		Northwestern
F/C	14	Woody Sauldsberry	6 ft 7 in (2.01 m)	220 lb (100 kg)		Texas Southern
F	16	Guy Sparrow	6 ft 6 in (1.98 m)	218 lb (99 kg)		Detroit Mercy

Coaches
Head coach
- Neil Johnston (Ohio State)

Legend
- (DP) Unsigned draft pick
- (FA) Free agent
- (S) Suspended
- Injured

== Regular season ==
=== Season standings ===
Eastern Division	W	L	PCT	GB	Home	Road	Neutral	Div
x-Boston Celtics	59	16	.787	–	25–2	24–9	10–5	28–11
x-Philadelphia Warriors	49	26	.653	10	22–6	12–19	15–1	22–17
x-Syracuse Nationals	45	30	.600	14	25–4	12–19	8–7	21–18
New York Knicks	27	48	.360	32	13–18	9–19	5–11	7–32

=== Game log ===
1959–60 game log
#	Date	Opponent	Score	High points	Record
1	October 24	@ New York	118–109	Wilt Chamberlain (43)	1–0
2	October 31	Detroit	112–120	Wilt Chamberlain (36)	2–0
3	November 4	Syracuse	113–124	Wilt Chamberlain (41)	3–0
4	November 7	@ Boston	106–115	Wilt Chamberlain (30)	3–1
5	November 8	Cincinnati	106–134	Wilt Chamberlain (32)	4–1
6	November 10	New York	125–126	Wilt Chamberlain (39)	5–1
7	November 11	@ Detroit	119–105	Wilt Chamberlain (41)	6–1
8	November 12	@ Cincinnati	124–116	Wilt Chamberlain (55)	7–1
9	November 14	Minneapolis	98–104	Wilt Chamberlain (28)	8–1
10	November 15	N Minneapolis	100–106	Arizin, Chamberlain (26)	8–2
11	November 20	St. Louis	118–117	Paul Arizin (44)	8–3
12	November 21	@ Syracuse	107–116	Paul Arizin (29)	8–4
13	November 22	N Syracuse	103–114	Wilt Chamberlain (37)	9–4
14	November 25	@ Boston	123–113	Wilt Chamberlain (45)	10–4
15	November 26	Boston	130–143	Wilt Chamberlain (49)	11–4
16	November 28	@ New York	109–108	Guy Rodgers (30)	12–4
17	November 29	New York	127–126	Wilt Chamberlain (33)	12–5
18	December 3	Minneapolis	109–123	Wilt Chamberlain (41)	13–5
19	December 4	N St. Louis	112–124	Wilt Chamberlain (39)	14–5
20	December 5	@ St. Louis	112–113	Woody Sauldsberry (26)	14–6
21	December 6	Detroit	116–118	Paul Arizin (33)	15–6
22	December 9	@ Boston	116–137	Wilt Chamberlain (39)	15–7
23	December 10	Cincinnati	112–131	Wilt Chamberlain (34)	16–7
24	December 12	Boston	126–117	Paul Arizin (29)	16–8
25	December 13	@ Syracuse	121–150	Wilt Chamberlain (36)	16–9
26	December 15	N Cincinnati	131–107	Wilt Chamberlain (38)	17–9
27	December 16	@ Cincinnati	114–105	Wilt Chamberlain (43)	18–9
28	December 19	@ St. Louis	89–102	Wilt Chamberlain (30)	18–10
29	December 25	N Syracuse	121–129	Wilt Chamberlain (45)	19–10
30	December 26	New York	122–116	Wilt Chamberlain (39)	19–11
31	December 28	N Cincinnati	109–104	Wilt Chamberlain (39)	20–11
32	December 30	Minneapolis	107–122	Wilt Chamberlain (45)	21–11
33	January 2	Boston	117–118	Wilt Chamberlain (47)	22–11
34	January 5	N Minneapolis	126–111	Wilt Chamberlain (52)	23–11
35	January 6	St. Louis	101–121	Paul Arizin (34)	24–11
36	January 7	N Detroit	120–105	Wilt Chamberlain (44)	25–11
37	January 9	Syracuse	112–119	Wilt Chamberlain (48)	26–11
38	January 10	@ New York	116–103	Wilt Chamberlain (35)	27–11
39	January 12	St. Louis	108–126	Wilt Chamberlain (37)	28–11
40	January 13	N Syracuse	131–132 (OT)	Wilt Chamberlain (42)	29–11
41	January 15	Boston	124–112	Wilt Chamberlain (44)	29–12
42	January 17	@ Boston	123–129	Wilt Chamberlain (43)	29–13
43	January 19	N New York	114–93	Wilt Chamberlain (30)	30–13
44	January 20	@ Syracuse	129–123	Wilt Chamberlain (33)	31–13
45	January 23	@ Detroit	110–130	Wilt Chamberlain (44)	31–14
46	January 24	@ Cincinnati	104–95	Wilt Chamberlain (30)	32–14
47	January 25	N Detroit	127–117	Wilt Chamberlain (58)	33–14
48	January 27	N New York	129–117	Wilt Chamberlain (43)	34–14
49	January 29	Boston	116–124	Wilt Chamberlain (43)	35–14
50	January 30	@ New York	108–115	Wilt Chamberlain (45)	35–15
51	January 31	N Minneapolis	114–104	Wilt Chamberlain (41)	36–15
52	February 1	N Minneapolis	103–96	Wilt Chamberlain (23)	37–15
53	February 2	Cincinnati	107–109	Wilt Chamberlain (34)	38–15
54	February 4	@ Syracuse	110–137	Wilt Chamberlain (43)	38–16
55	February 6	Syracuse	126–129	Wilt Chamberlain (44)	39–16
56	February 7	@ St. Louis	108–130	Wilt Chamberlain (38)	39–17
57	February 9	@ Detroit	113–122	Wilt Chamberlain (41)	39–18
58	February 10	@ New York	117–125	Woody Sauldsberry (27)	39–19
59	February 11	St. Louis	120–139	Joe Graboski (36)	40–19
60	February 13	@ Boston	120–122	Paul Arizin (42)	40–20
61	February 14	Boston	125–115	Paul Arizin (28)	40–21
62	February 16	@ Cincinnati	117–112	Wilt Chamberlain (44)	41–21
63	February 17	Syracuse	116–123	Wilt Chamberlain (33)	42–21
64	February 18	@ Syracuse	122–136	Wilt Chamberlain (33)	42–22
65	February 20	Minneapolis	106–122	Wilt Chamberlain (41)	43–22
66	February 21	@ New York	129–122	Wilt Chamberlain (58)	44–22
67	February 23	N Boston	126–108	Wilt Chamberlain (53)	45–22
68	February 25	New York	121–131	Wilt Chamberlain (39)	46–22
69	February 27	@ Minneapolis	91–109	Wilt Chamberlain (34)	46–23
70	February 28	@ Detroit	113–111	Tom Gola (24)	47–23
71	March 2	@ Boston	119–133	Wilt Chamberlain (39)	47–24
72	March 3	Detroit	101–110	Wilt Chamberlain (41)	48–24
73	March 4	N New York	136–134 (OT)	Wilt Chamberlain (42)	49–24
74	March 6	@ St. Louis	109–128	Wilt Chamberlain (32)	49–25
75	March 9	@ Syracuse	126–137	Wilt Chamberlain (31)	49–26

== Playoffs ==
1960 playoff game log
Division semifinals: 2–1 (home: 2–0; road: 0–1)

Game	Date	Team	Score	High points	High rebounds	High assists	Location	Series
1	March 11	Syracuse	W 115–92	Paul Arizin (40)	Wilt Chamberlain (27)	Tom Gola (7)	Philadelphia Civic Center	1–0
2	March 13	@ Syracuse	L 119–125	Paul Arizin (29)	Wilt Chamberlain (18)	Guy Rodgers (6)	Onondaga War Memorial	1–1
3	March 14	Syracuse	W 132–112	Wilt Chamberlain (53)	Tom Gola (23)	Tom Gola (11)	Philadelphia Civic Center	2–1

Division finals: 2–4 (home: 1–2; road: 1–2)

Game	Date	Team	Score	High points	High rebounds	High assists	Location	Series
1	March 16	@ Boston	L 105–111	Wilt Chamberlain (42)	Wilt Chamberlain (29)	Paul Arizin (5)	Boston Garden	0–1
2	March 18	Boston	W 115–110	Paul Arizin (30)	Wilt Chamberlain (28)	Guy Rodgers (9)	Philadelphia Civic Center	1–1
3	March 19	@ Boston	L 90–120	Woody Sauldsberry (22)	Wilt Chamberlain (15)	Wilt Chamberlain (6)	Boston Garden	1–2
4	March 20	Boston	L 104–112	Paul Arizin (35)	Wilt Chamberlain (34)	Guy Rodgers (5)	Philadelphia Civic Center	1–3
5	March 22	@ Boston	W 128–107	Wilt Chamberlain (50)	Wilt Chamberlain (35)	Tom Gola (10)	Boston Garden	2–3
6	March 24	Boston	L 117–119	Guy Rodgers (31)	Wilt Chamberlain (24)	Guy Rodgers (9)	Philadelphia Civic Center	2–4

1960 schedule

== Awards and honors ==
- Wilt Chamberlain, NBA Most Valuable Player Award
- Wilt Chamberlain, NBA All-Star Game Most Valuable Player Award
- Wilt Chamberlain, NBA All-Star Game
- Paul Arizin, NBA All-Star Game
- Tom Gola, NBA All-Star Game
- Wilt Chamberlain, NBA Scoring Champion
- Wilt Chamberlain, NBA Rookie of the Year Award
- Wilt Chamberlain, All-NBA First Team
