= 1959–60 NBA season =

14th NBA season

- League: National Basketball Association
- Sport: Basketball
- Duration: October 17, 1959 – March 10, 1960; March 11–26, 1960 (Playoffs); March 27 – April 9, 1960 (Finals)
- Games: 75
- Teams: 8
- TV partner: NBC

Draft
- Top draft pick: Bob Boozer
- Picked by: Cincinnati Royals

Regular season
- Top seed: Boston Celtics
- Season MVP: Wilt Chamberlain (Philadelphia)
- Top scorer: Wilt Chamberlain (Philadelphia)

Playoffs
- Eastern champions: Boston Celtics
- Eastern runners-up: Philadelphia Warriors
- Western champions: St. Louis Hawks
- Western runners-up: Minneapolis Lakers

Finals
- Champions: Boston Celtics
- Runners-up: St. Louis Hawks

NBA seasons
- ← 1958–59 1960–61 →

The 1959–60 NBA season was the 14th season of the National Basketball Association. The season ended with the Boston Celtics winning their second straight NBA championship, beating the St. Louis Hawks 4 games to 3 in the NBA Finals.

== Notable occurrences ==
- On November 7, 1959, in a game between the Boston Celtics and the Philadelphia Warriors, Bill Russell and Wilt Chamberlain played the first game of their 10-year professional rivalry.
- The 1960 NBA All-Star Game was played in Philadelphia, with the East beating the West 125–115. Rookie Wilt Chamberlain of the local Philadelphia Warriors won the game's MVP award.
- The Minneapolis Lakers played their final season in the Twin Cities. There would not be another NBA team in Minnesota until the Minnesota Timberwolves in 1989–90.
- In an interesting quirk in the schedule, the Philadelphia Warriors and Minneapolis Lakers play a two-game series in California on January 31 – February 1, 1960, with the first game being played in San Francisco (the Warriors' future home) and the second in Los Angeles (the Lakers' future home).
- The NBA schedule was expanded from 72 games per team to 75.

Coaching changes
Offseason
Team	1958–59 coach	1959–60 coach
Philadelphia Warriors	Al Cervi	Neil Johnston
In-season
Team	Outgoing coach	Incoming coach
Detroit Pistons	Red Rocha	Dick McGuire
Minneapolis Lakers	John Castellani	Jim Pollard
New York Knicks	Andrew Levane	Carl Braun

== Final standings ==
=== Eastern Division ===
Eastern Division	W	L	PCT	GB	Home	Road	Neutral	Div
x-Boston Celtics	59	16	.787	–	25–2	24–9	10–5	28–11
x-Philadelphia Warriors	49	26	.653	10	22–6	12–19	15–1	22–17
x-Syracuse Nationals	45	30	.600	14	25–4	12–19	8–7	21–18
New York Knicks	27	48	.360	32	13–18	9–19	5–11	7–32

=== Western Division ===
Western Division	Wins	Losses	PCT	GB	Home	Road	Neutral	Division
x-St. Louis Hawks	46	29	.613	–	28–5	12–20	6–4	27–12
x-Detroit Pistons	30	45	.400	16	17–14	6–21	7–10	20–19
x-Minneapolis Lakers	25	50	.333	21	9–15	9–21	7–14	17–22
Cincinnati Royals	19	56	.253	27	9–22	2–20	8–14	14–25

x – clinched playoff spot

== Playoffs ==
Division Semifinals
E3	Syracuse	1
E2	Philadelphia	2
W3	Minneapolis	2
W2	Detroit	0

Division Finals
Eastern Division
E1	Boston*	4
E2	Philadelphia	2
Western Division
W1	St. Louis*	4
W3	Minneapolis	3

NBA Finals
E1	Boston*	4
W1	St. Louis*	3

- * Division winner
- Bold Series winner
- Italic Team with home-court advantage in NBA Finals

== Statistics leaders ==
Category	Player	Team	Stat
Points	Wilt Chamberlain	Philadelphia Warriors	2,707
Rebounds	Wilt Chamberlain	Philadelphia Warriors	1,941
Assists	Bob Cousy	Boston Celtics	715
FG%	Kenny Sears	New York Knicks	.477
FT%	Dolph Schayes	Syracuse Nationals	.893

Note: Prior to the 1969–70 season, league leaders in points, rebounds, and assists were determined by totals rather than averages.

== NBA awards ==
- Most Valuable Player: Wilt Chamberlain, Philadelphia Warriors
- Rookie of the Year: Wilt Chamberlain, Philadelphia Warriors
- All-NBA First Team:
  - F – Elgin Baylor, Minneapolis Lakers
  - F – Bob Pettit, St. Louis Hawks
  - C – Wilt Chamberlain, Philadelphia Warriors
  - G – Bob Cousy, Boston Celtics
  - G – Gene Shue, Detroit Pistons
- All-NBA Second Team:
  - F – Dolph Schayes, Syracuse Nationals
  - F – Jack Twyman, Cincinnati Royals
  - C – Bill Russell, Boston Celtics
  - G – Richie Guerin, New York Knicks
  - G – Bill Sharman, Boston Celtics

== See also ==
- List of NBA regular season records
