= 1958 NBA Finals =

1958 basketball championship series

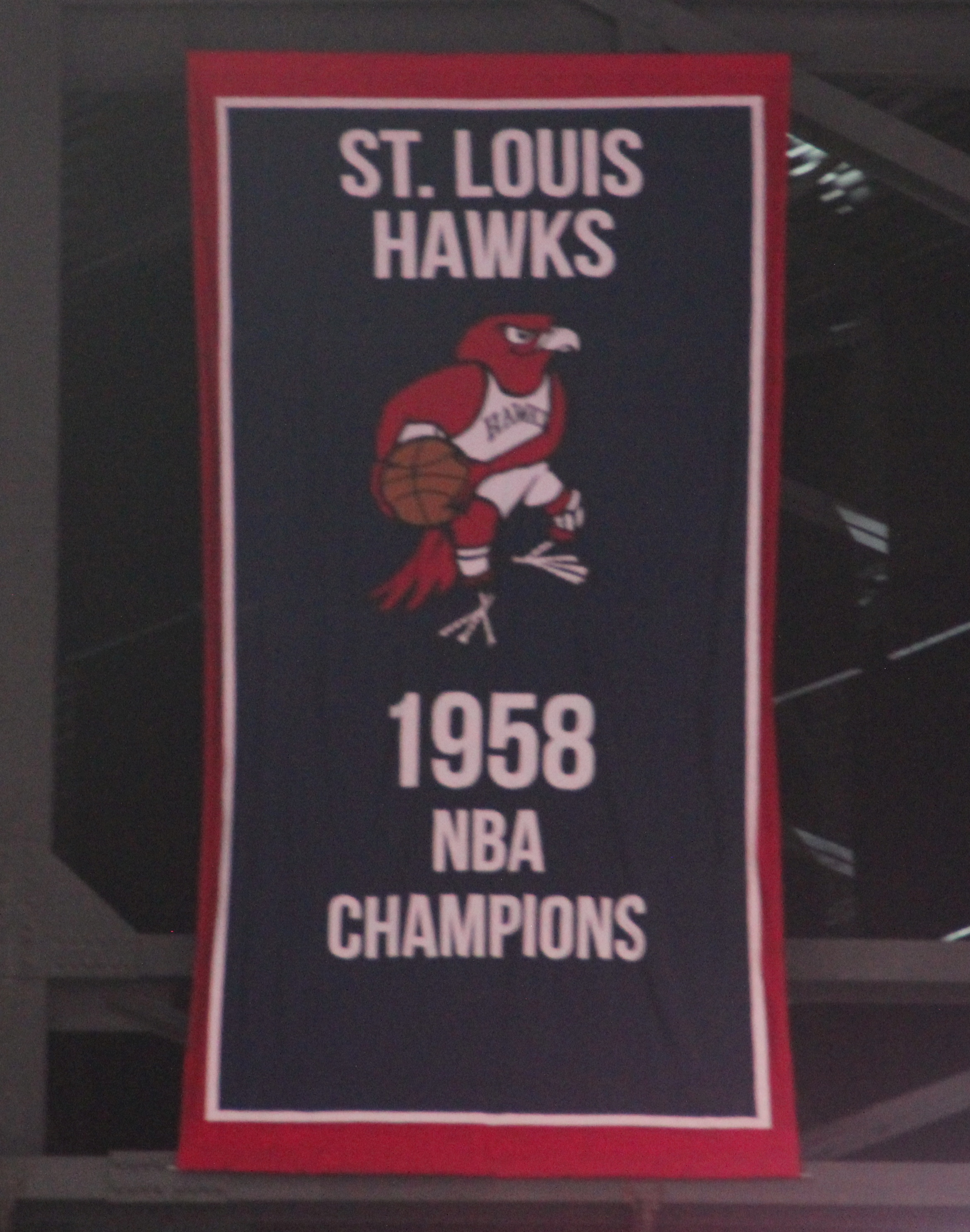
- 1958 NBA champions banner at State Farm Arena
Team	Coach	Wins
St. Louis Hawks	Alex Hannum	4
Boston Celtics	Red Auerbach	2
- Dates: March 29–April 12
- Hall of Famers: Celtics: Bill Russell (as a player and coach); Andy Phillip; Arnie Risen; Tom Heinsohn (as a player and coach); Bob Cousy; Frank Ramsey; Sam Jones; Bill Sharman (as a player and coach); Hawks: Slater Martin; Ed Macauley; Cliff Hagan; Bob Pettit; Coaches: Alex Hannum; Red Auerbach
- Eastern finals: Celtics defeated Warriors, 4–1
- Western finals: Hawks defeated Pistons, 4–1

The 1958 NBA World Championship Series was the championship series for the 1957–58 National Basketball Association (NBA) season, and the culmination of the season's playoffs. It pitted the Western Division champion St. Louis Hawks against the Eastern Division champion Boston Celtics. The Hawks won the series in six games to win the franchise's first and only NBA title. This was the last Finals until 1967 that was not won by the Celtics, and the last until 1971 that was won by the Western Division or Conference.

As of 2026, this is the only championship won by the Hawks, who currently possess the second longest championship drought in the NBA, and the fifth longest championship drought in North American sports.

== Recap ==
After being defeated by the Celtics in Game 7 of the 1957 NBA Finals, St. Louis survived a sometimes difficult 1957-58 NBA season en route to winning the Western Division crown with a 41–31 record. The Celtics, meanwhile, had dominated the Eastern Division with a 49–23 record. This was the third meeting between teams from Boston and St. Louis for a major professional sports championship.

The Hawks upset the Celtics (with a healthy Russell) in Game 1 at the Boston Garden, 104–102. Boston struck back with a wipeout in Game 2, 136–112. In St. Louis, the Hawks prevailed 111–108 in Game 3 when Russell severely sprained his ankle. Without Russell, the Celtics evened the series with a 109-98 surprise victory in Game 4. St. Louis forced a 102–100 win in Game 5 in Boston to take the series lead.

Back home in Kiel Auditorium on April 12, the Hawks weren't about to miss their opportunity to defeat the defending champions. Pettit turned in a spectacular performance. He scored 31 points in the first three quarters, then zoomed off in the final period, nailing 19 of his team's last 21 points. His last two points, on a tip-in with 15 seconds remaining, put the Hawks ahead 110–107. The Celtics scored one final bucket but could do no more. The Hawks finally had a title, 110–109. Pettit had scored 50 points, including 18 of the Hawks' final 21 points in propelling the Hawks to the championship. Pettit's 50 points set a new Finals record for most scored by a player in a series-clinching game, a record that would be tied by Giannis Antetokounmpo in 2021.

Most observers figured that the Celtics probably would have won the 1958 title if Russell had not suffered his ankle injury in game 3. Auerbach, however, found no comfort in that opinion. "You can always look for excuses," he said. "We just got beat."

== Series summary ==
Game	Date	Home team	Result	Road team
Game 1	March 29	Boston Celtics	102–104 (0–1)	St. Louis Hawks
Game 2	March 30	Boston Celtics	136–112 (1–1)	St. Louis Hawks
Game 3	April 2	St. Louis Hawks	111–108 (2–1)	Boston Celtics
Game 4	April 5	St. Louis Hawks	98–109 (2–2)	Boston Celtics
Game 5	April 9	Boston Celtics	100–102 (2–3)	St. Louis Hawks
Game 6	April 12	St. Louis Hawks	110–109 (4–2)	Boston Celtics

Hawks win series 4–2

== Team rosters ==
=== St. Louis Hawks ===
1957–58 St. Louis Hawks roster
Players

Pos.	No.	Player	Height	Weight	DOB	From
PF	11	Jack Coleman	6 ft 7 in (2.01 m)	195 lb (88 kg)	1924-05-23	Louisville
PF	12	Walt Davis	6 ft 8 in (2.03 m)	205 lb (93 kg)	1931-01-05	Texas A&M
SF	16	Cliff Hagan	6 ft 4 in (1.93 m)	210 lb (95 kg)	1931-12-09	Kentucky
C	20	Ed Macauley	6 ft 8 in (2.03 m)	185 lb (84 kg)	1928-03-22	Saint Louis
PG	22	Slater Martin	5 ft 10 in (1.78 m)	170 lb (77 kg)	1925-10-22	Texas
SG	21	Jack McMahon	6 ft 1 in (1.85 m)	185 lb (84 kg)	1928-12-03	St. John's
C	12	Red Morrison	6 ft 8 in (2.03 m)	220 lb (100 kg)	1932-04-26	Idaho
SG	17	Med Park	6 ft 2 in (1.88 m)	205 lb (93 kg)	1933-04-11	Missouri
PF	9	Bob Pettit	6 ft 9 in (2.06 m)	205 lb (93 kg)	1932-12-12	LSU
G/F	19	Frank Selvy	6 ft 3 in (1.91 m)	180 lb (82 kg)	1932-11-09	Furman
C	13	Chuck Share	6 ft 11 in (2.11 m)	235 lb (107 kg)	1927-03-14	Bowling Green
PG	15	Win Wilfong	6 ft 2 in (1.88 m)	185 lb (84 kg)	1933-03-18	Memphis

Coaches
Head coach

Alex Hannum

Legend
- (DP) Unsigned draft pick
- (FA) Free agent
- (S) Suspended
- Injured

Roster

=== Boston Celtics ===
1957–58 Boston Celtics roster
Players

Pos.	No.	Player	Height	Weight	DOB	From
G	14	Bob Cousy	6 ft 1 in (1.85 m)	175 lb (79 kg)	1928-08-09	Holy Cross
F/C	15	Tom Heinsohn	6 ft 7 in (2.01 m)	218 lb (99 kg)	1934-08-26	Holy Cross
SG	24	Sam Jones	6 ft 4 in (1.93 m)	198 lb (90 kg)	1933-06-24	North Carolina Central
F/C	16	Jack Nichols	6 ft 7 in (2.01 m)	222 lb (101 kg)	1926-04-09	Washington
G	17	Andy Phillip	6 ft 2 in (1.88 m)	195 lb (88 kg)	1922-03-07	Illinois
G/F	23	Frank Ramsey	6 ft 3 in (1.91 m)	190 lb (86 kg)	1931-07-13	Kentucky
F/C	19	Arnie Risen	6 ft 9 in (2.06 m)	200 lb (91 kg)	1924-10-09	Ohio State
C	6	Bill Russell	6 ft 9 in (2.06 m)	215 lb (98 kg)	1934-02-12	San Francisco
G	21	Bill Sharman	6 ft 1 in (1.85 m)	175 lb (79 kg)	1926-05-25	USC
F	29	Lou Tsioropoulos	6 ft 5 in (1.96 m)	190 lb (86 kg)	1930-08-31	Kentucky

Coaches
Head coach
- Red Auerbach

Legend
- (DP) Unsigned draft pick
- (FA) Free agent
- (S) Suspended
- Injured

Roster

== Game summaries ==
=== Game 1 ===
March 29

Recap

St. Louis Hawks 104, Boston Celtics 102 (OT)
Scoring by quarter: 17–23, 42–30, 21–30, 24–19
Pts: Cliff Hagan 33; Rebs: Bob Pettit 19; Asts: Jack McMahon 5	Pts: Bob Cousy 27; Rebs: Bill Russell 29; Asts: Bob Cousy 5
St. Louis leads the series, 1–0

Boston Garden, Boston, Massachusetts
Referees: Heft, Rudolph

=== Game 2 ===
March 30

Recap

St. Louis Hawks 112, Boston Celtics 136
Scoring by quarter: 25–33, 35–35, 28–38, 24–30
Pts: Cliff Hagan 37; Rebs: Cliff Hagan 12; Asts: Hagan, Pettit, McMahon 3	Pts: Bob Cousy 25; Rebs: Bill Russell 27; Asts: Bob Cousy 10
Series tied, 1–1

Boston Garden, Boston, Massachusetts
Referees: Rudolph, Heft

=== Game 3 ===
April 2

Recap

Boston Celtics 108, St. Louis Hawks 111
Scoring by quarter: 25–23, 24–26, 26–34, 33–28
Pts: Frank Ramsey 29; Rebs: Bill Russell 13; Asts: Bob Cousy 7	Pts: Bob Pettit 32; Rebs: Bob Pettit 19; Asts: Jack McMahon 7
St. Louis leads the series, 2–1

Kiel Auditorium, St. Louis, Missouri
Referees: Heft, Rudolph

=== Game 4 ===
April 5

Recap

Boston Celtics 109, St. Louis Hawks 98
Scoring by quarter: 25–16, 32–35, 27–20, 25–27
Pts: Bob Cousy 24; Rebs: Cousy, Ramsey, Heinsohn 13 each Asts: Bob Cousy 10	Pts: Cliff Hagan 27; Rebs: Bob Pettit 17; Asts: Wilfong Share 9 each
Series tied, 2–2

Kiel Auditorium, St. Louis, Missouri
Referees: Heft, Rudolph

=== Game 5 ===
April 9

Recap

St. Louis Hawks 102, Boston Celtics 100
Scoring by quarter: 26–18, 32–25, 26–27, 18–30
Pts: Bob Pettit 33; Rebs: Bob Pettit 21; Asts: Slater Martin 5	Pts: Frank Ramsey 30; Rebs: Frank Ramsey 20; Asts: Bob Cousy 5
St. Louis leads the series, 3–2

Boston Garden, Boston, Massachusetts
Referees: Rudolph, Heft

=== Game 6 ===
April 12

Recap

Boston Celtics 108, St. Louis Hawks 111
Scoring by quarter: 18–22, 34–35, 25–21, 32–32
Pts: Bill Sharman 26; Rebs: Arnie Risen 13; Asts: Bob Cousy 9	Pts: Bob Pettit 50; Rebs: Bob Pettit 19
St. Louis wins the NBA Finals, 4–2

Kiel Auditorium, St. Louis, Missouri
Referees: Rudolph, Heft

== See also ==
- 1958 NBA playoffs
