= Joe Holup =

American basketball player

Personal information
- Born: February 26, 1934 Swoyersville, Pennsylvania, U.S.
- Died: January 28, 1998 (aged 63) Rexford, New York, U.S.
- Listed height: 6 ft 6 in (1.98 m)
- Listed weight: 215 lb (98 kg)

Career information
- High school: Swoyersville (Swoyersville, Pennsylvania)
- College: George Washington (1952–1956)
- NBA draft: 1956: 1st round, 5th overall pick
- Drafted by: Syracuse Nationals
- Playing career: 1956–1963
- Position: Power forward
- Number: 12, 9

Career history

Playing
- 1956–1957: Syracuse Nationals
- 1957–1959: Detroit Pistons
- 1959–1960: Williamsport Billies
- 1960–1961: Baltimore Bullets
- 1961–1963: Wilkes-Barre Barons

Coaching
- 1960: Williamsport Billies

Career highlights
- First-team All-American – Look (1956); Third-team All-American – AP, NEA, Collier's (1956); NCAA rebounding leader (1956)

Career NBA statistics
- Points: 1,347 (7.0 ppg)
- Rebounds: 852 (4.4 rpg)
- Assists: 193 (1.0 apg)
- Stats at NBA.com
- Stats at Basketball Reference

Joseph J. Holup (February 26, 1934 – January 28, 1998) was an American basketball player. He played college basketball for George Washington University and later professionally in the National Basketball Association and the Eastern Professional Basketball League.

== College career ==
A 6'6' forward, Holup starred at George Washington University from 1953 to 1956. He tallied 2,226 points and 2,030 rebounds in 104 varsity games, and led the NCAA in rebounds per game (25.6) during the 1955–56 season. Holup held George Washington's record for most career points until 2003, when he was surpassed by Chris Monroe. He ranks second among NCAA Division I rebounding leaders with his 2,030 career rebounds.

== Professional career ==
After college, Holup was selected with the fifth overall pick of the 1956 NBA draft by the Syracuse Nationals. He played three seasons in the NBA with the Nationals and Detroit Pistons, averaging 7.0 points per game and 4.4 rebounds per game. He later played several seasons in the Eastern Professional Basketball League. He spent the 1959–1960 season with the Williamssport Billies where he averaged 12.4 points and 6.9 rebounds. He was named the Billies acting head coach for the remainder of the season in February 1960 after head coach Bobby Sand was injured in an automobile accident. He started the following season with the Baltimore Bullets before being obtained by the Wilkes-Barre Barons in a cash deal in January 1961.

== Death ==
Holup died in Rexford, New York in 1998.

== Career statistics ==
Legend
GP	Games played	GS	Games started	MPG	Minutes per game
FG%	Field goal percentage	3P%	3-point field goal percentage	FT%	Free throw percentage
RPG	Rebounds per game	APG	Assists per game	SPG	Steals per game
BPG	Blocks per game	PPG	Points per game	**Bold**	Career high

=== NBA ===
==== Regular season ====
Year	Team	GP	MPG	FG%	FT%	RPG	APG	PPG
1956–57	Syracuse	**71**	18.1	.329	**.806**	3.9	**1.2**	7.4
1957–58	Syracuse	16	8.3	.246	.696	1.4	.8	2.8
1957–58	Detroit	37	16.4	.348	.775	**5.4**	.6	5.6
1958–59	Detroit	68	**22.1**	**.360**	.760	5.2	1.1	**8.4**
Career		192	18.4	.342	.781	4.4	1.0	7.0

==== Playoffs ====
Year	Team	GP	MPG	FG%	FT%	RPG	APG	PPG
1957	Syracuse	5	17.6	.214	.667	4.0	.2	4.0
1958	Detroit	**7**	**19.1**	**.349**	.750	**5.1**	.4	**6.0**
1959	Detroit	3	12.0	.214	**.857**	2.7	**1.0**	4.0
Career		15	17.2	.282	.743	4.3	.5	4.9

== See also ==
- List of NCAA Division I men's basketball players with 2000 points and 1000 rebounds
- List of NCAA Division I men's basketball career free throw scoring leaders
- List of NCAA Division I men's basketball season rebounding leaders
- List of NCAA Division I men's basketball career rebounding leaders
