= 1957–58 Detroit Pistons season =

NBA team season

- Head coach: Charles Eckman; Red Rocha
- General manager: Fred DeLano
- Owner: Fred Zollner
- Arena: Detroit Olympia

Results
- Record: 33–39 (.458)
- Place: Division: 2nd (Western)
- Playoff finish: West Division Finals (eliminated 1–4)
- Stats at Basketball Reference

Local media
- Television: WJBK/WWJ-TV & WXYZ-TV
- Radio: WJR

The 1957–58 Detroit Pistons season was the Detroit Pistons' tenth season in the NBA and first season in the city of Detroit.

The new Detroit Pistons played home games at Olympia Stadium, home of the Detroit Red Wings, and struggled to find a footing in their new hometown. Team owner Fred Zollner provided the team with their own aircraft to travel for road games, but the NBA responded with a difficult travel schedule, especially during the winter, as the Pistons could avoid commercial air delays. The Pistons went 33–39 (.458) during the season, tied for second in the Western Division, with the Cincinnati Royals, eight games behind the St. Louis Hawks, but were awarded the second seed on tie-breakers.

The Pistons defeated the Royals in two straight games in the West Semifinal series, but lost the West Finals to the Hawks 4–1. The team was led by forward George Yardley (27.8 ppg, 10.7 rpg, NBA All-Star) and guards Gene Shue (15.6 ppg, NBA All-Star) and Dick McGuire (8.1 ppg, 6.6 apg, NBA All-Star).

== Regular season ==
=== Season standings ===
Western Division	W	L	PCT	GB	Home	Road	Neutral	Div
x-St. Louis Hawks	41	31	.569	-	23-8	8-19	10-4	24-12
x-Detroit Pistons	33	39	.458	8	14-14	13-17	6-8	18-18
x-Cincinnati Royals	33	39	.458	8	17-12	10-19	6-8	17-19
Minneapolis Lakers	19	53	.264	22	10-15	4-21	5-17	13-23

x – clinched playoff spot

=== Game log ===
1957–58 Game log
#	Date	Opponent	Score	High points	Record
1	October 23	Boston	L 94–105	George Yardley (20)	0–1
2	October 26	Philadelphia	L 100–112	George Yardley (41)	0–2
3	October 30	@ Minneapolis	W 115–96	George Yardley (28)	1–2
4	November 3	@ Cincinnati	W 94–88	George Yardley (23)	2–2
5	November 5	vs. Boston	L 105–111	Harry Gallatin (25)	2–3
6	November 12	New York	W 109–107	George Yardley (32)	3–3
7	November 15	Minneapolis	L 104–112	George Yardley (31)	3–4
8	November 16	@ New York	W 109–105	George Yardley (35)	4–4
9	November 17	@ Philadelphia	W 95–91	George Yardley (26)	5–4
10	November 19	vs. Cincinnati	L 75–92	George Yardley (17)	5–5
11	November 21	Boston	L 90–112	George Yardley (22)	5–6
12	November 23	@ St. Louis	L 110–115	Bob Houbregs (24)	5–7
13	November 26	vs. Minneapolis	W 109–91	George Yardley (31)	6–7
14	November 27	St. Louis	L 110–121	George Yardley (30)	6–8
15	November 29	@ Cincinnati	L 87–92 (OT)	George Yardley (26)	6–9
16	November 30	Cincinnati	W 100–96	George Yardley (32)	7–9
17	December 1	@ New York	L 102–109	George Yardley (39)	7–10
18	December 3	Boston	L 113–124	George Yardley (34)	7–11
19	December 5	vs. Cincinnati	L 99–109	George Yardley (32)	7–12
20	December 6	@ Syracuse	L 91–118	George Yardley (34)	7–13
21	December 7	Cincinnati	W 109–105	George Yardley (25)	8–13
22	December 10	Philadelphia	L 97–100	George Yardley (30)	8–14
23	December 12	@ Philadelphia	W 101–96	George Yardley (28)	9–14
24	December 15	New York	L 109–116	George Yardley (27)	9–15
25	December 17	vs. St. Louis	L 99–106	George Yardley (22)	9–16
26	December 21	Cincinnati	W 112–101	George Yardley (31)	10–16
27	December 22	@ Syracuse	L 93–119	Shue, Thieben (12)	10–17
28	December 25	Minneapolis	L 104–106	George Yardley (29)	10–18
29	December 26	@ St. Louis	W 110–106	George Yardley (48)	11–18
30	December 27	@ New York	L 120–125	George Yardley (31)	11–19
31	December 28	Syracuse	W 117–111	George Yardley (20)	12–19
32	December 31	@ Cincinnati	L 96–130	George Yardley (22)	12–20
33	January 4	Philadelphia	W 81–78	Gene Shue (17)	13–20
34	January 5	@ St. Louis	L 93–95	Walter Dukes (18)	13–21
35	January 7	vs. Cincinnati	L 99–114	Walter Dukes (17)	13–22
36	January 8	Syracuse	W 109–107	Gallatin, Yardley (26)	14–22
37	January 10	vs. Minneapolis	L 114–124	George Yardley (23)	14–23
38	January 11	Minneapolis	W 129–102	George Yardley (23)	15–23
39	January 12	@ Syracuse	L 109–135	George Yardley (25)	15–24
40	January 15	@ Boston	L 113–131	George Yardley (51)	15–25
41	January 16	@ Philadelphia	W 113–108	George Yardley (25)	16–25
42	January 17	Cincinnati	W 115–94	George Yardley (31)	17–25
43	January 18	@ St. Louis	L 103–105	George Yardley (36)	17–26
44	January 19	@ Minneapolis	L 111–118	Jordon, Yardley (24)	17–27
45	January 22	New York	L 92–115	Harry Gallatin (16)	17–28
46	January 23	@ Minneapolis	L 125–128 (OT)	George Yardley (44)	17–29
47	January 25	St. Louis	W 105–98	Harry Gallatin (27)	18–29
48	January 26	@ Cincinnati	L 103–107	George Yardley (33)	18–30
49	January 27	Philadelphia	W 115–93	Gene Shue (25)	19–30
50	January 30	vs. Syracuse	W 87–83	Walter Dukes (21)	20–30
51	January 31	vs. New York	W 119–105	George Yardley (36)	21–30
52	February 1	vs. Philadelphia	L 86–106	Walter Dukes (18)	21–31
53	February 2	@ Boston	L 115–119	George Yardley (31)	21–32
54	February 4	Syracuse	W 118–113	George Yardley (52)	22–32
55	February 7	vs. St. Louis	W 125–107	George Yardley (37)	23–32
56	February 9	New York	L 98–100	Gallatin, Yardley (16)	23–33
57	February 11	@ Philadelphia	L 98–115	George Yardley (27)	23–34
58	February 12	St. Louis	L 105–122	Chuck Noble (19)	23–35
59	February 14	@ Boston	W 111–109	George Yardley (29)	24–35
60	February 15	Minneapolis	L 110–111	Phil Jordon (29)	24–36
61	February 16	@ St. Louis	W 100–98	Gene Shue (21)	25–36
62	February 18	Syracuse	W 120–98	George Yardley (48)	26–36
63	February 19	@ Minneapolis	W 117–115 (OT)	George Yardley (43)	27–36
64	February 21	@ Cincinnati	W 109–107	George Yardley (32)	28–36
65	February 22	St. Louis	W 98–96	Harry Gallatin (22)	29–36
66	February 25	vs. St. Louis	W 114–113 (OT)	George Yardley (44)	30–36
67	February 26	Boston	L 99–106	Gene Shue (30)	30–37
68	February 27	vs. Minneapolis	W 112–109	George Yardley (41)	31–37
69	March 1	@ New York	W 103–101	George Yardley (36)	32–37
70	March 6	@ Minneapolis	W 132–116	George Yardley (49)	33–37
71	March 8	@ Boston	L 103–108	George Yardley (22)	33–38
72	March 9	@ Syracuse	L 90–111	George Yardley (26)	33–39

== Playoffs ==
1958 playoff game log
Division Semifinals: 2–0 (home: 1–0; road: 1–0)

Game	Date	Team	Score	High points	Location	Series
1	March 15	Cincinnati	W 100–83	George Yardley (29)	Detroit Olympia	1–0
2	March 16	@ Cincinnati	W 124–104	Yardley, Dukes (24)	Cincinnati Gardens	2–0

Division Finals: 1–4 (home: 0–2; road: 1–2)

Game	Date	Team	Score	High points	Location Attendance	Series
1	March 19	@ St. Louis	L 111–114	Gene Shue (29)	Kiel Auditorium; 7,328	0–1
2	March 22	St. Louis	L 96–99	George Yardley (26)	University of Detroit Fieldhouse	0–2
3	March 23	@ St. Louis	W 109–89	George Yardley (31)	Kiel Auditorium; 9,321	1–2
4	March 25	St. Louis	L 101–145	Yardley, Dukes (16)	Detroit Olympia	1–3
5	March 27	@ St. Louis	L 96–120	Yardley, Dukes (18)	Kiel Auditorium; 7,661	1–4

1958 schedule

== Awards and records ==
- George Yardley, All-NBA First Team
