= Walter Davis =

Walter Davis may refer to:

== Politics ==
- Walter Scott Davis (1866–1943), Washington state senator
- Walter Naylor Davis (1876–1951), Missouri Democrat
- Walter Davis (politician) (1915–1971), Australian

== Sports ==
- Walter Davis (basketball) (1954–2023), American
- Walter Davis (footballer) (1888–1937), British
- Walter Davis (rugby union), Australian
- Walter Davis (triple jumper) (born 1979), American
- Steel Arm Davis (Walter C. Davis, 1896–1941), American Negro league baseball player
- Walter S. Davis (1905–1979), American football coach for Tennessee State
- Walt Davis (1931–2020), American basketball player and high jumper

== Other ==
- Walter Davis (botanist) (1847–1930), British
- Walter Davis (blues) (1911–1963), blues singer and pianist
- Walter Davis Jr. (1932–1990), jazz pianist
- Walter A. Davis (born 1942), American philosopher, critic, and writer
- Walter J. Davis Jr. (born 1936), U.S. naval aviator and vice admiral
- Walter R. Davis (1920–2008), Texas oil tycoon and philanthropist
- Walter Davis, Illinois mechanic who assisted in Abraham Lincoln's patent
- Walter Swindell Davis (1887–1973), American architect

== See also ==
- Walter Davies (disambiguation)
