= Walt Davis =

American basketball player (1931–2020)

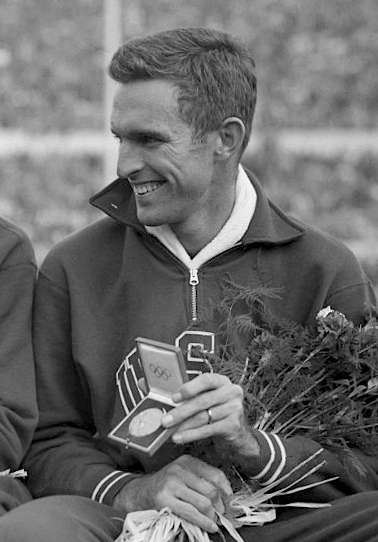
- Davis at the 1952 Olympics

Personal information
- Born: January 5, 1931 Beaumont, Texas, U.S.
- Died: November 17, 2020 (aged 89) Port Arthur, Texas, U.S.
- Listed height: 6 ft 8 in (2.03 m)
- Listed weight: 205 lb (93 kg)

Career information
- High school: Nederland (Nederland, Texas)
- College: Texas A&M (1949–1952)
- NBA draft: 1952: 2nd round, 13th overall pick
- Drafted by: Philadelphia Warriors
- Playing career: 1953–1958
- Position: Power forward / center
- Number: 12

Career history
- 1953–1958: Philadelphia Warriors
- 1958: St. Louis Hawks

Career highlights
- 2× NBA champion (1956, 1958)

Career statistics
- Points: 1,558 (4.8 ppg)
- Rebounds: 1,397 (4.3 rpg)
- Assists: 231 (0.7 apg)
- Stats at NBA.com
- Stats at Basketball Reference
Medals
Athletics
Representing United States
Gold medal – first place	1952 Helsinki	High jump

Walter Francis "Buddy" Davis (January 5, 1931 – November 17, 2020) was an American athlete. After winning a gold medal in the high jump at the 1952 Olympics he became a professional basketball player.

Despite contracting polio at age nine and being unable to walk for three years, Davis had a standout athletic career at Texas A&M University and later won Olympic gold in the 1952 Summer Olympics in Helsinki, Finland, with a leap of 2.04 metres (6 ft 8 1/4 in).

The Philadelphia Warriors selected the 6-foot-8-inch (2.03 m) Davis in the second round of the 1952 NBA draft. He spent five seasons with the Warriors and St. Louis Hawks, averaging 4.8 points and 4.3 rebounds per game.

Davis was Inducted into the Texas Sports Hall of Fame in 1964 and to the Texas Track and Field Coaches Association Hall of Fame in 2016.

Davis died on November 17, 2020, in Port Arthur, Texas at age 89.

== Career statistics ==
Legend
GP	Games played	GS	Games started	MPG	Minutes per game
FG%	Field goal percentage	3P%	3-point field goal percentage	FT%	Free throw percentage
RPG	Rebounds per game	APG	Assists per game	SPG	Steals per game
BPG	Blocks per game	PPG	Points per game	**Bold**	Career high
†	Won an NBA championship	*	Led the league

=== NBA ===
==== Regular season ====
Year	Team	GP	MPG	FG%	FT%	RPG	APG	PPG
1953–54	Philadelphia	68	**23.1**	.367	.644	**6.4**	**.9**	5.9
1954–55	Philadelphia	61	12.6	.385	.729	3.4	.6	2.9
1955–56†	Philadelphia	**70**	15.7	.369	.688	3.9	.8	4.6
1956–57	Philadelphia	65	19.2	**.407**	.698	4.7	.8	**6.6**
1957–58	Philadelphia	35	10.7	.341	.667	2.5	.5	3.0
1957–58†	St. Louis	26	11.0	.357	**.776**	3.3	.4	4.9
Career		325	16.4	.377	.695	4.3	.7	4.8

==== Playoffs ====
Year	Team	GP	MPG	FG%	FT%	RPG	APG	PPG
1956†	Philadelphia	**10***	6.9	**.455**	.500	2.8	.3	2.3
1957	Philadelphia	2	**18.5**	.308	**1.000**	**7.0**	**.5**	**6.0**
1958†	St. Louis	9	7.3	.379	.833	3.0	.3	3.6
Career		21	8.2	.391	.773	3.3	.3	3.2

Records
Preceded by Les Steers	Men's High Jump World Record Holder; 1953-06-27 — 1956-06-29	Succeeded by Charles Dumas
