= Lou Tsioropoulos =

Greek-American basketball player (1930–2015)

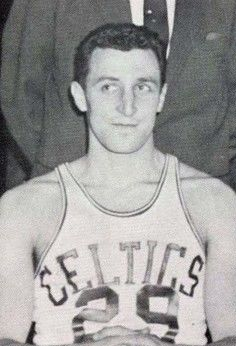
- Tsioropoulos in 1957

Personal information
- Born: August 31, 1930 Lynn, Massachusetts, U.S.
- Died: August 22, 2015 (aged 84) Louisville, Kentucky, U.S.
- Listed height: 6 ft 5 in (1.96 m)
- Listed weight: 190 lb (86 kg)

Career information
- High school: Lynn English (Lynn, Massachusetts)
- College: Kentucky (1950–1953)
- NBA draft: 1953: 7th round, 58th overall pick
- Drafted by: Boston Celtics
- Playing career: 1956–1959
- Position: Small forward
- Number: 29, 20

Career history
- 1956–1959: Boston Celtics

Career highlights
- 2× NBA champion (1957, 1959); NCAA champion (1951); Second-team All-SEC (1956)

Career NBA statistics
- Points: 910 (5.8 ppg)
- Rebounds: 751 (4.8 rpg)
- Assists: 165 (1.1 apg)
- Stats at NBA.com
- Stats at Basketball Reference

Louis Charles Tsioropoulos (Greek: Λουδοβίκος Τσιωρόπουλος; 31 August 1930 – 22 August 2015) was a Greek-American professional basketball player who played for the National Basketball Association's Boston Celtics for three seasons from 1956 to 1959. He was born in Lynn, Massachusetts.

== College career ==
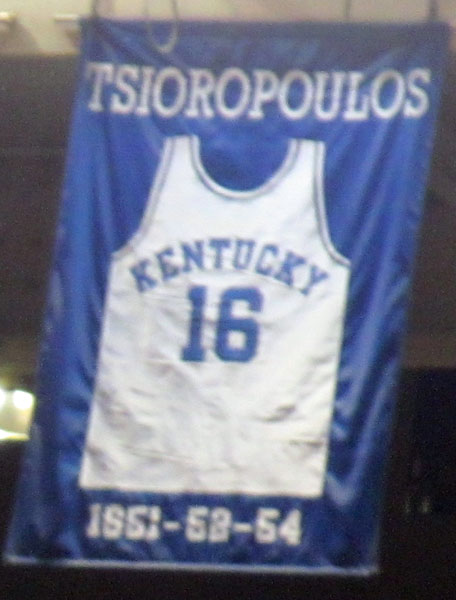
A jersey honoring Tsioropoulos hangs in Rupp Arena.

Tsioropoulos played college basketball for the Kentucky Wildcats under legendary coach Adolph Rupp. As a sophomore in 1951, he was a member of Kentucky's NCAA Championship team, which defeated Kansas State 68–58 in the Championship game.

In the fall of 1952, a point shaving scandal involving three Kentucky players (a fourth player, Bill Spivey, a teammate of Tsioropoulos on the 1951 National Championship team, was alleged to have been involved in the scandal but denied the charge) over a four-year period forced Kentucky to forfeit its upcoming season, which would have been the senior year for Tsiroropoulos and future Hall-of-Famers Frank Ramsey and Cliff Hagan. The suspension of the season made Kentucky's basketball team, in effect, the first college sports team to get the "death penalty", which actually was nothing more than the NCAA asking members schools not to schedule Kentucky, and not mandating it.

Tsioropoulos, Ramsey and Hagan all graduated from Kentucky in 1953, and as a result, became eligible for the NBA draft. All three players were selected by the Boston Celtics: Ramsey in the first round, Hagan in the third, and Tsioropoulos in the seventh. All three also returned to Kentucky for one more season, despite graduating. After finishing the regular season (one in which Tsioropoulos averaged 14.5 points per game) with a perfect 25–0 record and a #1 ranking in the Associated Press, Kentucky had been offered a bid into the NCAA Tournament. However, then-existing NCAA rules prohibited graduate students from participating in post-season play. The Wildcats declined the bid because their participation would have forced them to play without Tsioropoulos, Ramsey and Hagan, thus jeopardizing their perfect season.

Tsioropoulos' #16 jersey was retired by his alma mater, and he is in the University of Kentucky Athletics Hall of Fame.

== Professional career ==
=== Boston Celtics (1956-1959) ===
Tsioropoulos spent some time in the Air Force before joining the Celtics in 1956.

As Tom Heinsohn's backup at small forward, Tsioropoulos played three seasons with the Celtics, winning NBA championships in 1957 and 1959. In 157 NBA games, he averaged 5.8 points per game. His best NBA season was 1957–58; in which he averaged 7.7 points per game. This season was the only one of his three NBA seasons in which he played in the playoffs; he averaged 6.3 points per game. That year, the Bob Pettit-led St. Louis Hawks (which also featured Tsioropoulos' ex-college teammate Hagan, who had been traded to the Hawks in the Bill Russell deal) defeated the Celtics in the NBA Finals.

== Post basketball career ==
Tsioropoulos was a principal of Jefferson County High School, and later lived in Florida. He died in Louisville on 22 August 2015 at the age of 84.

== Career statistics ==
Legend
GP	Games played	GS	Games started	MPG	Minutes per game
FG%	Field goal percentage	3P%	3-point field goal percentage	FT%	Free throw percentage
RPG	Rebounds per game	APG	Assists per game	SPG	Steals per game
BPG	Blocks per game	PPG	Points per game	**Bold**	Career high
†	Won an NBA championship	*	Led the league

=== NBA ===
==== Regular season ====
Year	Team	GP	MPG	FG%	FT%	RPG	APG	PPG
1956–57†	Boston	52	12.9	.309	**.775**	4.0	.6	4.4
1957–58	Boston	**70**	**26.0**	**.317**	.686	**6.2**	**1.6**	**7.7**
1958–59†	Boston	35	13.9	.316	.758	3.1	.6	4.1
Career		157	19.0	.315	.717	4.8	1.1	5.8

==== Playoffs ====
Year	Team	GP	MPG	FG%	FT%	RPG	APG	PPG
1958	Boston	11*	21.7	.294	.655	5.8	1.3	6.3
