= 1957–58 St. Louis Hawks season =

NBA professional basketball team season

- NBA champions
- Division champions
- Head coach: Alex Hannum
- Arena: Kiel Auditorium

Results
- Record: 41–31 (.569)
- Place: Division: 1st (Western)
- Playoff finish: NBA champions (Defeated Celtics 4–2)
- Stats at Basketball Reference

The 1957–58 St. Louis Hawks season was the third for the franchise in St. Louis, ninth in the National Basketball Association (NBA), and 12th overall. Coming off their trip to the 1957 NBA Finals, the Hawks won the Western Division by 8 games with a record of 41 wins and 31 losses. Bob Pettit ranked 3rd in scoring and 2nd in rebounding. In the Western Finals, the Hawks would beat the Detroit Pistons in 5 games. The Hawks would then face the Boston Celtics in the NBA Finals. After Games 1 and 2, the teams headed to St. Louis with the series tied at a game apiece. The Hawks took Game 3, as the Celtics lost Bill Russell to an ankle injury. Despite playing without Russell, the Celtics were triumphant in Game 4. The Hawks pulled out a 2-point victory in Game 5 to take control of the series. Needing one more win for their first NBA Championship, the Hawks beat the Celtics 110–109 in Game 6. Bob Pettit scored 50 points playing against an injured Bill Russell as the Hawks and owner Ben Kerner won their first NBA Title.

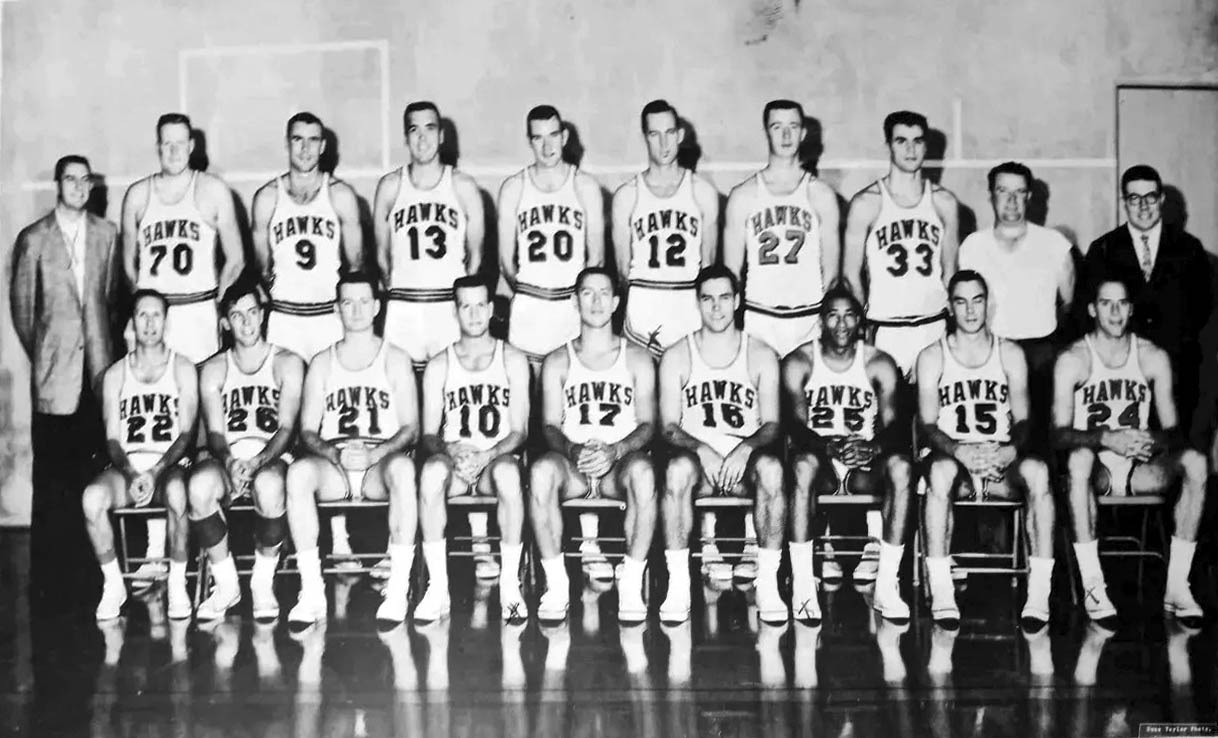
Team photo

The Hawks were the second St. Louis–based pro sports team to win a major championship, joining the, then, six-time World Series Champion St. Louis Cardinals of Major League Baseball. They would be followed by five more World Series championships by the Cardinals, a championship by the St. Louis Rams in Super Bowl XXXIV, and a championship by the St. Louis Blues in the 2019 Stanley Cup Finals which made St. Louis the eighth city to win a championship in each of the four major U.S. sports. The Hawks were the last non-integrated team to win an NBA title; every NBA champion since then has had at least one African-American player included.

The 1958 title remains the only one to be won by the franchise, which has been based in Atlanta since 1968. As such, it remains the second-longest drought for championship teams in NBA history behind only the Sacramento Kings, who had previously last won their only NBA Finals championship in 1951 back when they played as the Rochester Royals. HoopsHype later ranked this squad as the team with the 16th easiest route to the NBA Finals, primarily due to their first opponent being a 33–39 Detroit Pistons team that had recently moved to Detroit that season.

== Roster ==
1957–58 St. Louis Hawks roster
Players

Pos.	No.	Player	Height	Weight	DOB	From
PF	11	Jack Coleman	6 ft 7 in (2.01 m)	195 lb (88 kg)	1924-05-23	Louisville
PF	12	Walt Davis	6 ft 8 in (2.03 m)	205 lb (93 kg)	1931-01-05	Texas A&M
SF	16	Cliff Hagan	6 ft 4 in (1.93 m)	210 lb (95 kg)	1931-12-09	Kentucky
C	20	Ed Macauley	6 ft 8 in (2.03 m)	185 lb (84 kg)	1928-03-22	Saint Louis
PG	22	Slater Martin	5 ft 10 in (1.78 m)	170 lb (77 kg)	1925-10-22	Texas
SG	21	Jack McMahon	6 ft 1 in (1.85 m)	185 lb (84 kg)	1928-12-03	St. John's
C	12	Red Morrison	6 ft 8 in (2.03 m)	220 lb (100 kg)	1932-04-26	Idaho
SG	17	Med Park	6 ft 2 in (1.88 m)	205 lb (93 kg)	1933-04-11	Missouri
PF	9	Bob Pettit	6 ft 9 in (2.06 m)	205 lb (93 kg)	1932-12-12	LSU
G/F	19	Frank Selvy	6 ft 3 in (1.91 m)	180 lb (82 kg)	1932-11-09	Furman
C	13	Chuck Share	6 ft 11 in (2.11 m)	235 lb (107 kg)	1927-03-14	Bowling Green
PG	15	Win Wilfong	6 ft 2 in (1.88 m)	185 lb (84 kg)	1933-03-18	Memphis

Coaches
Head coach

Alex Hannum

Legend
- (DP) Unsigned draft pick
- (FA) Free agent
- (S) Suspended
- Injured

Roster

== Regular season ==
=== Season standings ===
Western Division	W	L	PCT	GB	Home	Road	Neutral	Div
x-St. Louis Hawks	41	31	.569	-	23-8	8-19	10-4	24-12
x-Detroit Pistons	33	39	.458	8	14-14	13-17	6-8	18-18
x-Cincinnati Royals	33	39	.458	8	17-12	10-19	6-8	17-19
Minneapolis Lakers	19	53	.264	22	10-15	4-21	5-17	13-23

=== Game log ===
1957–58 Game log
#	Date	Opponent	Score	High points	Record
1	October 22	Boston	L 90–115	Bob Pettit (26)	0–1
2	October 23	vs. New York	L 95–112	Cliff Hagan (19)	0–2
3	October 26	Minneapolis	W 112–84	Bob Pettit (27)	1–2
4	November 1	@ Cincinnati	L 92–99	Bob Pettit (45)	1–3
5	November 2	Cincinnati	W 102–93	Slater Martin (25)	2–3
6	November 5	Syracuse	W 115–101	Bob Pettit (34)	3–3
7	November 9	Philadelphia	W 105–100	Bob Pettit (23)	4–3
8	November 11	@ Boston	L 88–92	Ed Macauley (19)	4–4
9	November 15	@ Syracuse	L 86–91	Cliff Hagan (22)	4–5
10	November 16	Syracuse	W 118–101	Bob Pettit (33)	5–5
11	November 17	@ Cincinnati	W 98–97	Bob Pettit (24)	6–5
12	November 19	New York	W 118–115	Bob Pettit (38)	7–5
13	November 23	Detroit	W 115–110	Cliff Hagan (40)	8–5
14	November 26	@ New York	W 120–110	Bob Pettit (27)	9–5
15	November 27	@ Detroit	W 121–110	Bob Pettit (27)	10–5
16	November 28	Cincinnati	W 112–96	Bob Pettit (28)	11–5
17	November 30	@ Minneapolis	L 113–118	Bob Pettit (28)	11–6
18	December 3	vs. Minneapolis	W 115–108	Bob Pettit (31)	12–6
19	December 5	@ Philadelphia	L 109–124	Slater Martin (27)	12–7
20	December 6	@ Boston	L 97–111	Bob Pettit (28)	12–8
21	December 8	New York	L 110–113	Cliff Hagan (24)	12–9
22	December 10	vs. Cincinnati	W 102–90	Bob Pettit (31)	13–9
23	December 11	vs. New York	W 135–126	Bob Pettit (43)	14–9
24	December 12	vs. Boston	W 97–94	Cliff Hagan (28)	15–9
25	December 14	New York	W 136–124	Bob Pettit (23)	16–9
26	December 15	@ Minneapolis	W 138–118	Cliff Hagan (40)	17–9
27	December 17	vs. Detroit	W 106–99	Bob Pettit (36)	18–9
28	December 21	vs. Syracuse	W 146–136	Bob Pettit (51)	19–9
29	December 22	Minneapolis	W 123–115	Cliff Hagan (31)	20–9
30	December 26	Detroit	L 106–110	Cliff Hagan (21)	20–10
31	December 27	@ Cincinnati	W 97–96	Ed Macauley (25)	21–10
32	December 28	Boston	W 112–107	Cliff Hagan (33)	22–10
33	December 30	vs. Minneapolis	W 105–98	Ed Macauley (27)	23–10
34	January 2	@ Philadelphia	L 93–95	Ed Macauley (26)	23–21
35	January 5	Detroit	W 95–93	Bob Pettit (26)	24–11
36	January 7	@ New York	W 114–112	Ed Macauley (25)	25–11
37	January 10	@ Philadelphia	L 93–124	Share, Wilfong (15)	25–12
38	January 11	Boston	W 102–98	Cliff Hagan (25)	26–12
39	January 12	Minneapolis	W 111–105	Cliff Hagan (27)	27–12
40	January 14	Philadelphia	L 109–110	Cliff Hagan (36)	27–13
41	January 16	@ Syracuse	L 96–112	Hagan, Pettit (24)	27–14
42	January 17	vs. Minneapolis	L 110–112 (OT)	Cliff Hagan (32)	27–15
43	January 18	Detroit	W 105–103	Bob Pettit (40)	28–15
44	January 19	Cincinnati	W 108–90	Bob Pettit (28)	29–15
45	January 25	@ Detroit	L 98–105	Ed Macauley (24)	29–16
46	January 26	Philadelphia	L 112–125	Cliff Hagan (32)	29–17
47	January 28	vs. Philadelphia	W 123–109	Bob Pettit (29)	30–17
48	January 29	@ Boston	L 101–111	Bob Pettit (22)	30–18
49	January 31	@ Cincinnati	L 92–100	Cliff Hagan (23)	30–19
50	February 1	Cincinnati	W 127–88	Cliff Hagan (24)	31–19
51	February 2	Syracuse	L 100–102	Cliff Hagan (29)	31–20
52	February 4	@ New York	L 116–120	Cliff Hagan (41)	31–21
53	February 7	vs. Detroit	L 107–125	Cliff Hagan (19)	31–22
54	February 8	@ Syracuse	W 103–102	Bob Pettit (32)	32–22
55	February 9	@ Philadelphia	L 98–105	Bob Pettit (29)	32–23
56	February 11	New York	W 107–105	Win Wilfong (25)	33–23
57	February 12	@ Detroit	W 122–105	Bob Pettit (25)	34–23
58	February 14	@ Minneapolis	W 104–100	Bob Pettit (23)	35–23
59	February 16	Detroit	L 98–100	Bob Pettit (27)	35–24
60	February 18	Minneapolis	118–98	Bob Pettit (33)	36–24
61	February 21	Boston	W 119–100	Bob Pettit (29)	37–24
62	February 22	@ Detroit	L 96–98	Cliff Hagan (32)	37–25
63	February 23	@ Syracuse	L 92–101	Bob Pettit (21)	37–26
64	February 25	vs. Detroit	L 113–114 (OT)	Cliff Hagan (34)	37–27
65	February 26	vs. Cincinnati	W 105–103	Ed Macauley (29)	38–27
66	March 2	Cincinnati	W 103–93	Bob Pettit (21)	39–27
67	March 5	@ Boston	L 102–109	Bob Pettit (30)	39–28
68	March 7	Syracuse	W 102–100	Bob Pettit (39)	40–28
69	March 8	Minneapolis	W 126–123	Hagan, Pettit (25)	41–28
70	March 9	@ Minneapolis	L 99–107	Bob Pettit (28)	41–29
71	March 10	@ Cincinnati	L 84–122	Hagan, Pettit (17)	41–30
72	March 11	Philadelphia	L 101–106	Bob Pettit (30)	41–31

== Playoffs ==
1958 playoff game log
Division Finals: 4–1 (home: 2–1; road: 2–0)

Game	Date	Team	Score	High points	Location Attendance	Series
1	March 19	Detroit	W 114–111	Cliff Hagan (38)	Kiel Auditorium; 7,328	1–0
2	March 22	@ Detroit	W 99–96	Cliff Hagan (27)	University of Detroit Fieldhouse	2–0
3	March 23	Detroit	L 89–109	Cliff Hagan (29)	Kiel Auditorium; 9,321	2–1
4	March 25	@ Detroit	W 145–101	Cliff Hagan (28)	Detroit Olympia	3–1
5	March 27	Detroit	W 120–96	Cliff Hagan (32)	Kiel Auditorium; 7,661	4–1

NBA Finals: 4–2 (home: 2–1; road: 2–1)

Game	Date	Team	Score	High points	High rebounds	Location Attendance	Series
1	March 29	@ Boston	W 104–102	Cliff Hagan (33)	Bob Pettit (19)	Boston Garden; 3,652	1–0
2	March 30	@ Boston	L 112–136	Cliff Hagan (37)	Cliff Hagan (12)	Boston Garden; 10,249	1–1
3	April 2	Boston	W 111–108	Bob Pettit (32)	Bob Pettit (19)	Kiel Auditorium; 10,148	2–1
4	April 5	Boston	L 98–109	Cliff Hagan (27)	Bob Pettit (17)	Kiel Auditorium; 10,216	2–2
5	April 9	@ Boston	W 102–100	Bob Pettit (33)	Bob Pettit (21)	Boston Garden; 13,909	3–2
6	April 12	Boston	W 110–109	Bob Pettit (50)	Bob Pettit (19)	Kiel Auditorium; 10,216	4–2

1958 schedule

== Awards and honors ==
- Bob Pettit, All-NBA First Team
- Slater Martin, All-NBA Second Team
- Cliff Hagan, All-NBA Second Team
