= Togo Palazzi =

American basketball player (1932–2022)

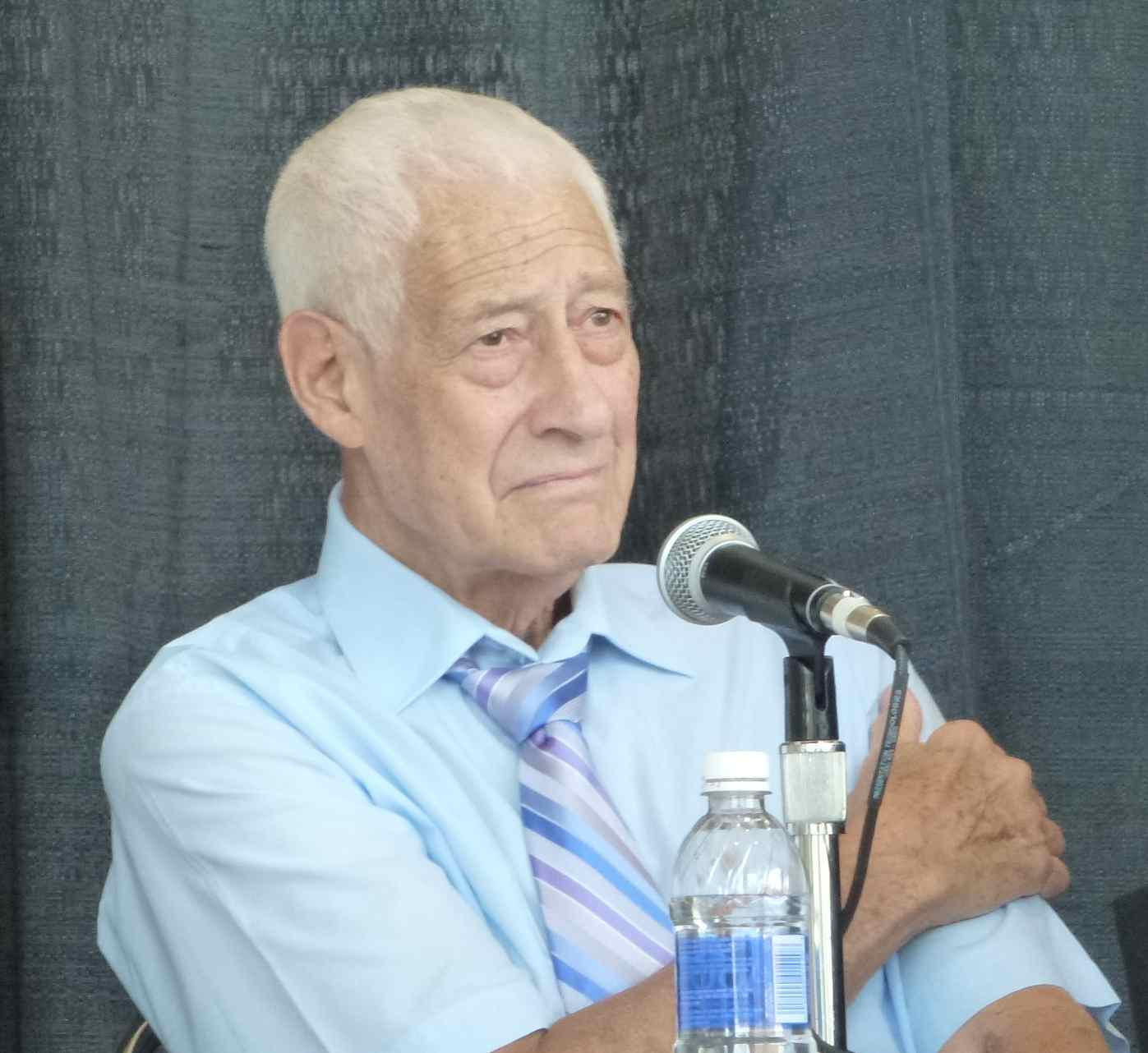
- Palazzi in 2013

Personal information
- Born: August 8, 1932 Union City, New Jersey, U.S.
- Died: August 12, 2022 (aged 90) Worcester, Massachusetts, U.S.
- Listed height: 6 ft 4 in (1.93 m)
- Listed weight: 205 lb (93 kg)

Career information
- High school: Union Hill (Union City, New Jersey)
- College: Holy Cross (1951–1954)
- NBA draft: 1954: 1st round, 5th overall pick
- Drafted by: Boston Celtics
- Playing career: 1954–1962
- Position: Small forward / shooting guard
- Number: 12, 6, 17
- Coaching career: 1960–1961, 1980–1985

Career history

Playing
- 1954–1956: Boston Celtics
- 1956–1960: Syracuse Nationals
- 1960–1962: Scranton Miners

Coaching
- 1960: Babson (interim)
- 1960–1961: Scranton Miners
- 1980–1985: Holy Cross (women's)

Career highlights
- All-EPBL Second Team (1961); Second-team All-American – Collier's (1954); Third-team All-American – AP, UPI, Look (1954); NIT champion (1954); NIT MVP (1954); No. 22 retired by Holy Cross Crusaders

Career NBA statistics
- Points: 2,382 (7.4 ppg)
- Rebounds: 1,113 (3.4 rpg)
- Assists: 233 (0.7 apg)
- Stats at NBA.com
- Stats at Basketball Reference

Togo Anthony Palazzi (August 8, 1932 – August 12, 2022) was an American basketball player who played in the National Basketball Association (NBA) for the Boston Celtics and Syracuse Nationals.

== Playing and coaching career ==
Palazzi was named by his father after Japanese admiral Tōgō Heihachirō. A 6'4" forward/guard born and raised in Union City, New Jersey, Palazzi played at Union Hill High School, where he was recognized as one of the top prep basketball players nationwide. He played at the College of the Holy Cross in the 1950s and was captain of the Crusaders team that won the 1954 NIT Championship and was named MVP of the tournament.

Palazzi was selected by the Boston Celtics with the fifth pick of the 1954 NBA draft. He played six seasons in the NBA as a member of the Celtics and Syracuse Nationals and averaged 7.4 points per game in his career.

Palazzi played for the Scranton Miners in the Eastern Professional Basketball League (EPBL) from 1960 to 1962. He was selected to the All-EPBL Second Team in 1961. Palazzi served as head coach of the Miners during the 1960–61 season and accumulated an 11–7 record.

In January 1960, Palazzi took over as interim basketball coach at Babson College after head coach and athletic director Tom Smith was seriously injured in an automobile accident. The Beavers went 10–8 under Palazzi.

Palazzi coached the Holy Cross women's team from 1980 to 1985, going 103–28 as coach; he coached them to an NCAA Women's Division I Basketball Tournament appearance in his final year, the first ever appearance by the women's team.

== Later life and death ==
Palazzi later gave speeches at basketball camps for young adults interested in the sport. He was a prominent fixture at camps such as the Scatlet Hawks Basketball Camp run by Steve Manguso in Milford, MA. Along with conducting area speeches he was the camp director of the Togo Palazzi/Sterling Recreation Basketball Camp in Sterling, Massachusetts.

Palazzi died on August 12, 2022, at the age of 90.

== Career statistics ==
Legend
GP	Games played	GS	Games started	MPG	Minutes per game
FG%	Field goal percentage	3P%	3-point field goal percentage	FT%	Free throw percentage
RPG	Rebounds per game	APG	Assists per game	SPG	Steals per game
BPG	Blocks per game	PPG	Points per game	**Bold**	Career high

=== NBA ===
==== Regular season ====
Year	Team	GP	MPG	FG%	FT%	RPG	APG	PPG
1954–55	Boston	53	9.5	**.399**	.750	2.8	.6	4.7
1955–56	Boston	63	11.2	.389	.685	2.9	.7	6.0
1956–57	Boston	21	11.1	.347	.719	3.6	.4	5.0
1956–57	Syracuse	42	**18.6**	.373	**.790**	**4.5**	**1.0**	**10.7**
1957–58	Syracuse	67	14.9	.394	.719	3.6	.6	8.6
1958–59	Syracuse	**71**	14.8	.392	.728	3.7	.9	8.4
1959–60	Syracuse	7	10.0	.317	.500	2.0	.4	4.3
Career		324	13.4	.386	.730	3.4	.7	7.4

==== Playoffs ====
Year	Team	GP	MPG	FG%	FT%	RPG	APG	PPG
1955	Boston	5	6.0	**.500**	.500	2.8	.2	5.8
1956	Boston	2	3.5	.200	–	1.0	.0	1.0
1957	Syracuse	5	**17.4**	.388	**.778**	**3.6**	**1.0**	**9.0**
1958	Syracuse	3	8.3	.214	.500	1.3	.0	3.0
1959	Syracuse	**8**	8.4	.295	.714	2.6	.8	4.5
Career		23	9.4	.353	.641	2.6	.5	5.3
