= Bob Hopkins =

American basketball player and coach (1934–2015)

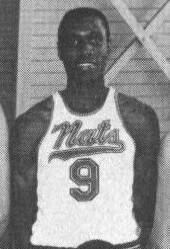
- Hopkins with the Syracuse Nationals in 1958

Personal information
- Born: November 3, 1934 Jonesboro, Louisiana, U.S.
- Died: May 15, 2015 (aged 80) Bellevue, Washington, U.S.
- Listed height: 6 ft 8 in (2.03 m)
- Listed weight: 205 lb (93 kg)

Career information
- High school: Jackson (Jonesboro, Louisiana)
- College: Grambling State (1952–1956)
- NBA draft: 1956: 10th round, 74th overall pick
- Drafted by: Syracuse Nationals
- Playing career: 1956–1962
- Position: Power forward / center
- Number: 9
- Coaching career: 1964–1991

Career history

Playing
- 1956–1960: Syracuse Nationals
- 1960–1962: Philadelphia Tapers

Coaching
- 1964–1965: Prairie View A&M
- 1966–1969: Alcorn State
- 1969–1974: Xavier (Louisiana)
- 1974–1977: Seattle SuperSonics (assistant)
- 1977: Seattle SuperSonics
- 1978–1979: New York Knicks (assistant)
- 1984–1986: Southern
- 1986–1989: Grambling State
- 1990–1991: Maryland Eastern Shore

Career highlights
- 6x SWAC regular season champion (1967-1969, 1986, 1987, 1989); SWAC Tournament (1985)

Career NBA statistics
- Points: 2,237 (8.2 ppg)
- Rebounds: 1,526 (5.6 rpg)
- Assists: 189 (0.7 apg)
- Stats at NBA.com
- Stats at Basketball Reference
- Collegiate Basketball Hall of Fame

Robert M. Hopkins (November 3, 1934 – May 15, 2015) was an American basketball player and coach.

== Biography ==
A native of Jonesboro, La., Hopkins participated in football, basketball, baseball, and track (He was invited to participate in the 1956 Olympic Games as a broad jumper but declined in order to sign with the Syracuse Nationals.) Over the course of his career he achieved all-state honors in football (twice). basketball (twice) and baseball (four times). He is most noted for playing college basketball at Grambling State University, where he scored 3,759 points (averaging 29.8 points per game for his career). He was the first Grambling player to make an all-American basketball team and the school's first professional player. Hopkins was an all-conference selection at Grambling all four years and made all-American three times. Over the course of his career he held the NAIA records for most career points (3,759), field goals made (1,403), free throws made (953), and rebounds (12,191). Hopkins was college basketball's all-time leading scorer until 1972 when Travis Grant of Kentucky State University set the new record of 4,045 points. Hopkins then played in the National Basketball Association (NBA) for four seasons (1956–1960) with the Syracuse Nationals and then the Philadelphia Tapers (1960–1962), but his career was eventually cut short due to a leg injury.

In his first venture as head coach (1965–66) at Prairie View College, Hopkins' squad posted a 16–10 record and a second-place finish in the Southwestern Athletic Conference (SAC). Moving next to Alcorn A&M (State) in Mississippi in 1966, Hopkins coached the Braves to three straight SAC championships, obtaining Coach of the Year honors following each season. His first two Alcorn teams participated in the national tournament at Kansas City, Mo. advancing to the second and third rounds respectively. In his third year, his team sported a 27–0 record before they were defeated in the finals of the NCAA College Division by Kentucky Wesleyan. He was voted regional Coach of the Year during his last two years at Alcorn by the NAIA.

Hopkins next served as the head coach for the Xavier University of Louisiana Gold Rush from 1969 to 1974, coaching future ABA and NBA stars Bruce Seals and "Slick" Watts. During his tenure, coach Hopkins led the team to 89 wins and 47 losses, four winning seasons, and two NAIA District 30 Championships, leading Xavier to the national NAIA Tournament in Kansas City for two consecutive years (1972 and 1973). He would next serve on Bill Russell's coaching staff with the Seattle SuperSonics and replaced Russell, his cousin, after the 1976–77 season. Hopkins posted a 5–17 record during the 1977–78 season before being fired; he was replaced by Lenny Wilkens, who led the Sonics to the NBA Finals that season and the following, winning the NBA championship in 1979.

Hopkins was inducted into the NAIA Hall of Fame in 1963, and elected into the College Basketball Hall of Fame in 2013.

Hopkins died of heart and kidney failure on May 15, 2015, and his funeral was held at St Monica Catholic Church on Mercer Island.

== Career playing statistics ==
Legend
GP	Games played	GS	Games started	MPG	Minutes per game
FG%	Field goal percentage	3P%	3-point field goal percentage	FT%	Free throw percentage
RPG	Rebounds per game	APG	Assists per game	SPG	Steals per game
BPG	Blocks per game	PPG	Points per game	**Bold**	Career high

=== NBA ===
==== Regular season ====
Year	Team	GP	MPG	FG%	FT%	RPG	APG	PPG
1956–57	Syracuse	62	12.3	.379	.746	3.8	.4	5.7
1957–58	Syracuse	69	17.7	.399	.764	5.7	.7	8.2
1958–59	Syracuse	67	**22.7**	**.403**	.752	**6.5**	**1.0**	**10.0**
1959–60	Syracuse	**75**	21.5	.389	**.782**	6.2	.7	8.7
Career		273	18.8	.394	.761	5.6	.7	8.2

==== Playoffs ====
Year	Team	GP	MPG	FG%	FT%	RPG	APG	PPG
1957	Syracuse	5	14.6	**.360**	.667	3.8	.4	5.6
1958	Syracuse	3	13.0	.250	.667	4.7	.0	4.0
1959	Syracuse	**9**	**22.6**	.338	.824	**6.7**	**1.0**	**8.2**
1960	Syracuse	1	19.0	.250	**1.000**	6.0	.0	7.0
Career		18	18.6	.325	.776	5.5	.6	6.7

== Head coaching record ==
=== NBA ===
Team	Year	G	W	L	W–L%	Finish	PG	PW	PL	PW–L%	Result
Seattle	1977–78	22	5	17	.227	(fired)	—	—	—	—	
Career		22	5	17	.227		—	—	—	—	
