= Frank Ramsey (basketball) =

American basketball player and coach (1931–2018)

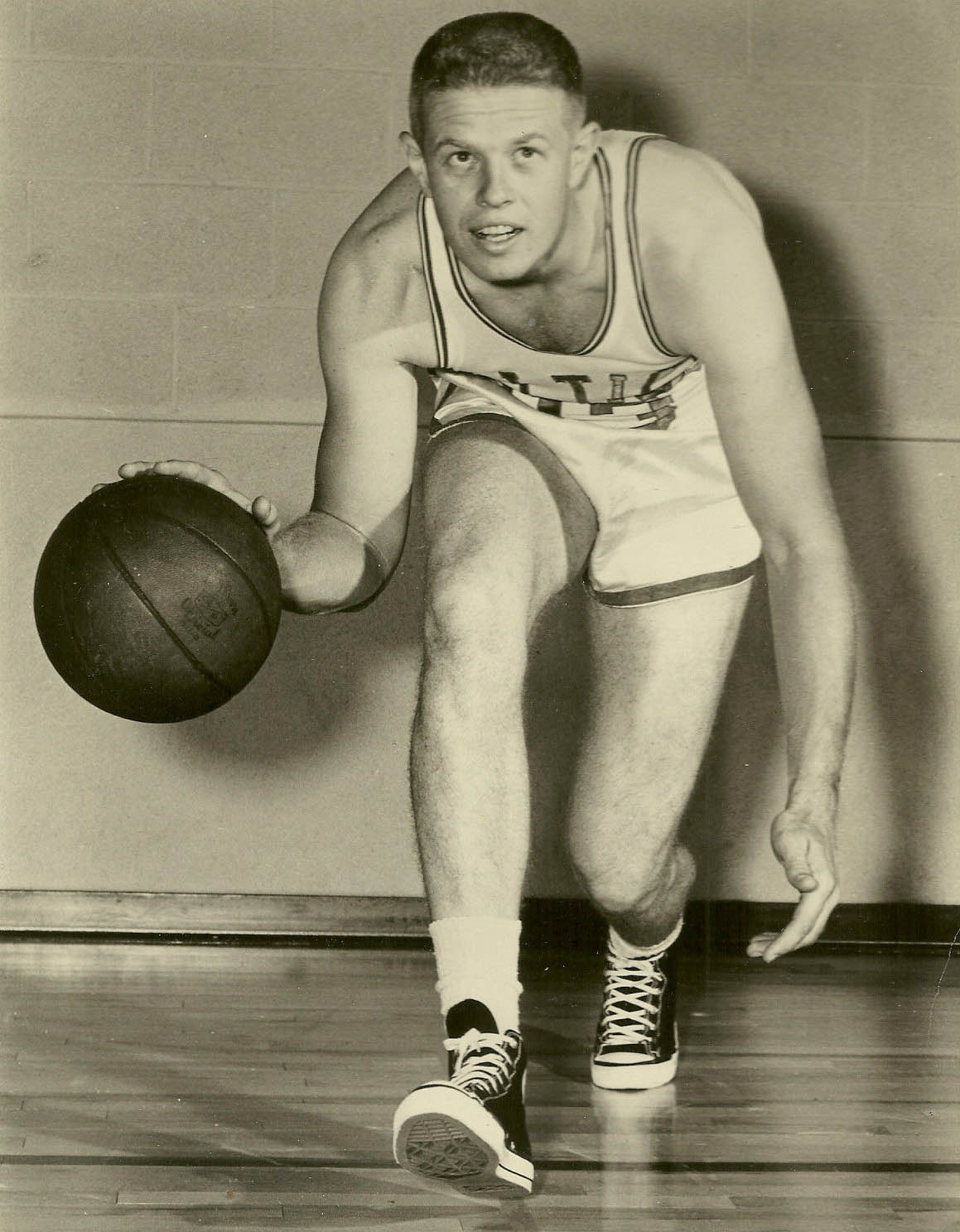

Personal information
- Born: July 13, 1931 Corydon, Kentucky, U.S.
- Died: July 8, 2018 (aged 86) Madisonville, Kentucky, U.S.
- Listed height: 6 ft 3 in (1.91 m)
- Listed weight: 190 lb (86 kg)

Career information
- High school: Madisonville (Madisonville, Kentucky)
- College: Kentucky (1950–1954)
- NBA draft: 1953: 1st round, 5th overall pick
- Drafted by: Boston Celtics
- Playing career: 1954–1964
- Position: Small forward / shooting guard
- Number: 23

Career history

Playing
- 1954–1955, 1956–1964: Boston Celtics

Coaching
- 1970–1971: Kentucky Colonels

Career highlights
- 7× NBA champion (1957, 1959–1964); No. 23 retired by Boston Celtics; NCAA champion (1951); Consensus second-team All-American (1954); Second-team All-American – AP, UPI (1952); Third-team All-American – AP, UPI (1951)

Career statistics
- Points: 8,378 (13.4 ppg)
- Rebounds: 3,410 (5.5 rpg)
- Assists: 1,134 (1.8 apg)
- Stats at NBA.com
- Stats at Basketball Reference
- Basketball Hall of Fame
- Collegiate Basketball Hall of Fame

Frank Vernon Ramsey Jr. (July 13, 1931 – July 8, 2018) was an American professional basketball player and coach. A 6-3 swingman, he played his entire nine-year (1954–1964) National Basketball Association (NBA) career with the Boston Celtics and played a major role in the early part of their dynasty, winning seven championships as part of the team. Ramsey was also a head coach for the Kentucky Colonels of the American Basketball Association (ABA) during the 1970–71 season. Ramsey was inducted into the Naismith Basketball Hall of Fame in 1982.

== University of Kentucky ==
Raised in Madisonville, Kentucky, Ramsey was a multi-sport athlete at the University of Kentucky, playing baseball as well as basketball. Playing under coach Adolph Rupp, Ramsey, as a sophomore in 1951, helped the Wildcats win the NCAA Championship with a 68–58 victory over Kansas State.

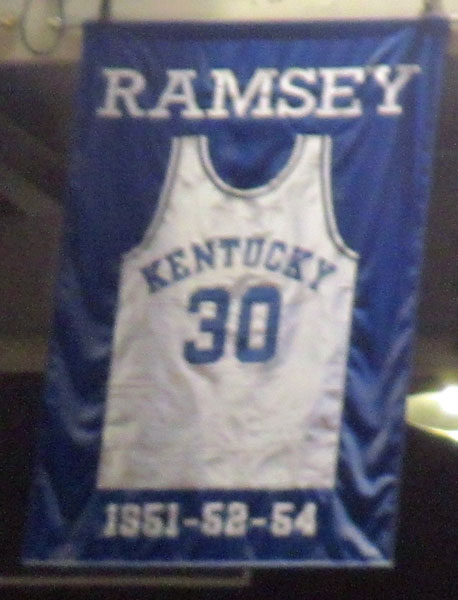
A jersey honoring Ramsey hangs in Rupp Arena.

In the fall of 1952, a point shaving scandal involving three Kentucky players (a fourth player, Bill Spivey, a teammate of Ramsey's on the 1951 championship team, was accused of being involved in the scandal but denied the charge) over a four-year period forced Kentucky to forfeit its upcoming season, Ramsey's senior year, as well as that of Cliff Hagan and Lou Tsioropoulos. The suspension of the season made Kentucky's basketball team, in effect, the first college sports team to get the "death penalty," although it was nothing more than the NCAA asking members schools not to schedule Kentucky, and not mandating it.

Ramsey, Hagan and Tsioropoulos all graduated from Kentucky in 1953 and, as a result, became eligible for the NBA draft. All three players were selected by the Boston Celtics—Ramsey in the first round, Hagan in the third, and Tsioropoulos in the seventh. All three also returned to Kentucky for one more season despite graduating. After finishing the regular season (one in which Ramsey averaged 19.6 points per game) with a perfect 25–0 record and a #1 ranking in the Associated Press, Kentucky had been offered a bid into the NCAA Tournament. However, then-existing NCAA rules prohibited graduate students from participating in post-season play; the Wildcats declined the bid because their participation would have forced them to play without Ramsey, Hagan and Tsioropoulos, thus jeopardizing their perfect season.

Ramsey also played on Kentucky Wildcats baseball team, earning All-SEC honors as an outfielder in 1951, 1952 and 1954.

Upon completion of his college basketball career, Ramsey scored 1344 points (14.8 ppg), which at the time ranked him fourth in the school's history, and grabbed 1038 rebounds (11.4 rpg), a school record later surpassed by one of his future Kentucky Colonels players, Dan Issel.

== Boston Celtics ==
After playing his rookie season with the Celtics (1954–1955), Ramsey spent one year in the military before rejoining the team. In the eight seasons he played after military service, he was a member of seven championship teams (1957, 1959–1964). He was a major contributor of the Celtics dynasty, playing behind the duo of Bob Cousy and Bill Sharman and playing with Bill Russell, Sam Jones, K. C. Jones, Tom Heinsohn, John Havlicek and Satch Sanders. In his 623 NBA games Ramsey scored 8378 points for an average of 13.4 points per game. He was inducted into the Naismith Memorial Basketball Hall of Fame in 1981. His #23 is retired by the Celtics.

Ramsey's best statistical season was 1957–1958; he averaged 16.5 points and 7.3 rebounds per game. It was also his only post-military season in which the Celtics did not win the NBA championship; the Bob Pettit-led St. Louis Hawks (who also featured Cliff Hagan, Ramsey's ex-college teammate) defeated them in the NBA Finals.

== Brief coaching career ==
Ramsey was also a head coach for one season (1970–71) in the ABA with the Kentucky Colonels, who were led by two former Kentucky Wildcats – Issel, a rookie, and Louie Dampier. Ramsey was named coach 17 games into an 84-game season (which began with Gene Rhodes coaching the first 15 games and fellow Kentucky alum Alex Groza coaching the next two), albeit on his own terms, where he commuted from Madisonville, Kentucky by plane without moving to Louisville, Kentucky. In Loose Balls, several associates noted Ramsey's methods of precision that ranged from specifically taping the player's ankles himself to taking the first flight out in the morning to even bringing in ammonia to sniff to help deal with thin air for games in Denver. While the team went just 32–35 with Ramsey in the regular season, he coached the Colonels into the playoffs. The Colonels made it all the way to the ABA Finals, where he put an oxygen tank on the bench to apparently deal with the high altitude (apparently, the tank actually had no oxygen in it). They lost to the Utah Stars, as coached by Bill Sharman, Ramsey's ex-Celtic teammate that went the full seven games. On June 20, Ramsey was fired and replaced by Joe Mullaney, who had just been fired by the Los Angeles Lakers.

Prior to coaching in the ABA, Ramsey had been Red Auerbach's first choice to replace his mentor as Celtics coach after Auerbach retired at the end of the 1965–66 season. However, Ramsey decided to move back to Madisonville; his father, Frank Sr., wasn't in good health and Frank Jr. had three children to raise.

== The NBA's first sixth man ==
Auerbach is often credited throughout basketball with creating the sixth man. Though Ramsey was one of the Celtics' best players, he felt more comfortable coming off the bench and Auerbach wanted him fresh and in the lineup at the end of close games. Ramsey was the first in a series of sixth men who won championship rings with the Celtics. In the championships the Celtics won after Ramsey's retirement, they have had successful sixth men such as Havlicek, Paul Silas, Kevin McHale, Bill Walton, and James Posey.

Ramsey was mentioned in the episode "If I Could See Me Now" of Married... with Children. Bud asked Al the trivia question, "Who was known as the best sixth man in basketball? He played for the Celtics", to which Al nonchalantly replied, "Frank Ramsey".

== Personal life ==
On November 15, 2005, Ramsey's house was destroyed in a tornado that hit his residence in Madisonville. One of his plaques was found miles away from his home, and Ramsey himself was found unhurt.

As of June 2008, Ramsey was a bank president in Dixon, Kentucky.

Ramsey died of natural causes in his hometown of Madisonville, Kentucky on July 8, 2018, at the age of 86.

== Honors ==
- Ramsey was inducted into the Naismith Basketball Hall of Fame in 1982.
- In 2005, Ramsey was inducted into the University of Kentucky Athletics Hall of Fame.
- In 2006, Ramsey was a charter inductee to the College Basketball Hall of Fame.
- Ramsey's #23 jersey is retired by the Boston Celtics.
- Ramsey's #30 jersey is retired by the University of Kentucky Wildcats.

== NBA career statistics ==
Legend
GP	Games played	GS	Games started	MPG	Minutes per game
FG%	Field goal percentage	3P%	3-point field goal percentage	FT%	Free throw percentage
RPG	Rebounds per game	APG	Assists per game	SPG	Steals per game
BPG	Blocks per game	PPG	Points per game	**Bold**	Career high
†	Won an NBA championship

=== Regular season ===
Year	Team	GP	MPG	FG%	FT%	RPG	APG	PPG
1954–55	Boston	64	27.4	.399	.755	6.3	**2.9**	11.2
1956–57†	Boston	35	23.1	.393	.791	5.1	1.9	11.9
1957–58	Boston	69	**29.7**	.419	.811	**7.3**	2.4	**16.5**
1958–59†	Boston	72	28.0	.378	.782	6.8	2.0	15.4
1959–60†	Boston	73	27.5	.397	.787	6.9	1.9	15.3
1960–61†	Boston	**79**	25.6	.407	.833	5.5	1.8	15.1
1961–62†	Boston	**79**	24.2	**.428**	.825	4.9	1.4	15.3
1962–63†	Boston	77	20.0	.382	.816	3.7	1.2	10.9
1963–64†	Boston	75	16.4	.374	.**841**	3.0	1.1	8.6
Career		623	24.6	.399	.804	5.5	1.8	13.4

=== Playoffs ===
Year	Team	GP	MPG	FG%	FT%	RPG	APG	PPG
1955	Boston	7	22.0	**.519**	.731	5.0	**2.3**	10.7
1957†	Boston	10	22.9	.463	.780	4.3	1.7	12.2
1958	Boston	11	32.0	.425	.915	**8.2**	1.5	18.4
1959†	Boston	11	27.5	.495	.802	6.2	1.8	**23.2**
1960†	Boston	**13**	**35.3**	.413	.873	7.7	2.1	16.7
1961†	Boston	10	30.0	.404	.813	6.4	**2.3**	17.1
1962†	Boston	**13**	16.2	.375	.911	2.9	0.8	9.2
1963†	Boston	**13**	19.3	.356	.723	2.7	0.9	8.3
1964†	Boston	10	13.8	.349	.857	2.1	1.0	6.2
Career		98	24.4	.424	.826	5.0	1.5	13.6

== Head coaching record ==
Legend
Regular season	G	Games coached	W	Games won	L	Games lost	W–L %	Win–loss %
Playoffs	PG	Playoff games	PW	Playoff wins	PL	Playoff losses	PW–L %	Playoff win–loss %

=== ABA ===
Team	Year	G	W	L	W–L%	Finish	PG	PW	PL	PW–L%	Result
Kentucky	1970–71	67	32	35	.478	2nd in Eastern	19	11	8	.579	Lost ABA Finals
