= Senator Davis =

Senator Davis may refer to:

== Members of the United States Senate ==
- Cushman Kellogg Davis (1838–1900), U.S. Senator from Minnesota from 1887 to 1900
- David Davis (Supreme Court justice) (1815–1886), U.S. Senator from Illinois from 1877 to 1883
- Garrett Davis (1801–1872), U.S. Senator from Kentucky from 1861 to 1872
- Henry Gassaway Davis (1823–1916), U.S. Senator from West Virginia from 1871 to 1883
- James J. Davis (1873–1947), U.S. Senator from Pennsylvania from 1930 to 1945
- Jeff Davis (Arkansas governor) (1862–1913), U.S. Senator from Arkansas from 1907 to 1913
- Jefferson Davis (1808–1889), U.S. Senator from Mississippi from 1857 to 1861
- John Davis (Massachusetts governor) (1787–1854), U.S. Senator from Massachusetts from 1835 to 1841

== United States state senate members ==
=== Alaska State Senate ===
- Bettye Davis (1938–2018)

=== Arizona State Senate ===
- Billy Davis (Arizona politician) (born 1945)
- Debbie McCune Davis (born 1951)

=== Arkansas State Senate ===
- Breanne Davis (fl. 2010s)

=== California State Senate ===
- Edward M. Davis (1916–2006)

=== Florida State Senate ===
- Hayward Davis (1928–2014)
- Helen Gordon Davis (1926–2015)
- LaVon Bracy Davis (born 1979)
- Tracie Davis (born 1970)
- W. Turner Davis (1901–1988)

=== Georgia State Senate ===
- Hardie Davis (born 1968)

=== Idaho State Senate ===
- Bart Davis (born 1955)

=== Illinois State Senate ===
- David Davis IV (1906–1978)
- Jacob C. Davis (1820–1883)
- Lloyd E. Davis (1899–1955)

=== Indiana State Senate ===
- John Wesley Davis (1799–1859)

=== Kansas State Senate ===
- Jonathan M. Davis (1871–1943)

=== Louisiana State Senate ===
- Jackson B. Davis (1918–2016)

=== Maine State Senate ===
- Daniel F. Davis (1843–1897)
- Gerald Davis (politician) (born 1936)
- Paul Davis (Maine politician) (born 1947)

=== Massachusetts State Senate ===
- George T. Davis (1810–1877)
- Isaac Davis (lawyer) (1799–1883)
- John Davis (U.S. district court judge) (1761–1847)

=== Michigan State Senate ===
- Jonathan D. Davis (1795–1853)
- Robert William Davis (1932–2009)

=== Minnesota State Senate ===
- Charles Russell Davis (1849–1930)

=== Mississippi State Senate ===
- Doug E. Davis (born 1977)
- Joseph R. Davis (1825–1896)
- Vincent Davis (born 1963)

=== Missouri State Senate ===
- Manvel H. Davis (1891–1959)

=== Nebraska State Senate ===
- Al Davis (Nebraska politician) (born 1952)

=== New Jersey State Senate ===
- John Warren Davis (judge) (1867–1945)

=== New York State Senate ===
- David Floyd Davis (1867–1951)
- George Allen Davis (1857–1920)

=== North Carolina State Senate ===
- Don Davis (North Carolina politician) (born 1971)
- Jim Davis (North Carolina politician) (born 1947)

=== North Dakota State Senate ===
- John E. Davis (North Dakota politician) (1913–1990)

=== Pennsylvania State Senate ===
- Preston Davis (politician) (1907–1990)

=== Rhode Island State Senate ===
- John W. Davis (governor) (1826–1907)
- Thomas Davis (Rhode Island politician) (1806–1895)

=== South Carolina State Senate ===
- Tom Davis (South Carolina politician) (born 1960)

=== South Dakota State Senate ===
- Sydney Davis (South Dakota politician) (fl. 2020s)

=== Texas State Senate ===
- Wendy Davis (politician) (born 1963)

=== Utah State Senate ===
- Gene Davis (politician) (born 1945)

=== Vermont State Senate ===
- Bliss N. Davis (1801–1885)

=== Virginia State Senate ===
- Alexander Davis (politician) (1833–1889)
- Beverly A. Davis (1868–1944)
- Jeannemarie Devolites Davis (born 1956)

=== Washington State Senate ===
- Walter Scott Davis (1866–1943)

=== Wisconsin State Senate ===
- Charles W. Davis (politician) (1827–1912)
- Horatio N. Davis (1812–1907)
- J. Mac Davis (born 1952)
- Romanzo E. Davis (1831–1908)

== Fictional senators ==
- Clay Davis, a state senator in the drama series The Wire

== Other ==
- George Davis (1820-1896), Confederate States Senator from North Carolina from 1862 to 1865

== See also ==
- Senator Davies (disambiguation)
