= Walter Davies =

Walter Davies may refer to:

- Walter Davies (politician), British Liberal Party politician
- Walter Davies (footballer), Welsh international footballer
- Walter Davies, commonly known by his bardic name Gwallter Mechain, Welsh poet, editor, translator, antiquary and Anglican clergyman
- Walter C. Davies, pen-name used by Cyril M. Kornbluth, American science fiction author

== See also ==
- Walter Davis (disambiguation)
