= Senator Davies =

Senator Davies may refer to:

- Elmer David Davies (1899–1957), Tennessee State Senate
- John T. Davies (politician) (born 1932), Minnesota State Senate
- William T. Davies (1831–1912), Pennsylvania State Senate
- William Davies (Georgia judge) (1775–1829), Georgia State Senate

== See also ==
- Senator Davis (disambiguation)
