= Fred DeLano =

American publicist and journalist

Fred Hurst DeLano (April 1, 1916 – February 24, 1989) was an American publicist and journalist who worked for the University of Michigan, Detroit Lions, and Detroit Pistons.

== Early life ==
DeLano was born on April 1, 1916, in Dowagiac, Michigan. He attended the University of Michigan, where he was the sports editor for the Michigan Daily. In 1936, he wrote two columns challenging head football coach Fielding H. Yost's decision to not play Notre Dame. Despite DeLano's efforts, the Michigan–Notre Dame football rivalry would not resume until 1942. He graduated from Michigan in 1937 with degrees in history and journalism and embarked upon a career in journalism.

== Career ==
In 1940, DeLano became the acting director of publicity for the University of Michigan athletic department when Philip C. Pack entered the Army National Guard. Pack resigned the following year and DeLano replaced him on a permanent basis. In 1944, he resigned to join the sports staff at the Chicago Tribune. He returned to Michigan later that year to become the publicity manager for the Detroit Lions of the National Football League. From 1946 to 1947, he was the director of public relations for Alma College.

From 1948 to 1953, DeLano was the sports editor of the Press-Telegram in Long Beach, California. He returned to publicity work with the West-Marquis Agency. He was the publicity director of the Long Beach Convention Authority and managed publicity for the Miss Universe pageant.

In 1955, DeLano returned to Michigan as the publicity manager for the University of Detroit. In 1957, he became the vice president and general manager of the Detroit Pistons of the National Basketball Association after the team relocated from Fort Wayne, Indiana. He resigned after one season to return to publicity work. He was the director of public relations and publicity for the Detroit Race Course until he was replaced by Budd Lynch in 1962. He also managed media coverage of the Archery Manufacturers and Dealers Association's national archery tournament and was a promotional assistant for Carling Brewery's world championship golf tournament.

DeLano returned to journalism in 1967 as a reporter for the Plymouth Mail & Observer. He briefly worked for the Farmington Enterprise and Observer before returning to the Mail & Observer in 1968 as editor. In 1972, he became the assistant news editor at Observer Newspapers Inc.

DeLano died on February 24, 1989.
