= 1957–58 New York Knicks season =

Season of National Basketball Association team the New York Knicks

- Head coach: Vince Boryla
- General manager: Fred Podesta
- Arena: Madison Square Garden

Results
- Record: 35–37 (.486)
- Place: Division: 4th (Eastern)
- Playoff finish: Did not qualify
- Stats at Basketball Reference

Local media
- Television: WPIX
- Radio: WINS

The 1957–58 New York Knicks season was the 12th season for the team in the National Basketball Association (NBA). With a 35–37 regular season record, the Knicks did not qualify for the 1958 NBA Playoffs.

== NBA draft ==
Note: This is not an extensive list; it only covers the first and second rounds, and any other players picked by the franchise that played at least one game in the league.

Round	Pick	Player	Position	Nationality	School/Club team
1	5	Brendan McCann	G	United States	St. Bonaventure
2	13	Larry Friend	G/F	United States	California

== Regular season ==
=== Season standings ===
Eastern Division	W	L	PCT	GB	Home	Road	Neutral	Div
x-Boston Celtics	49	23	.681	-	25-4	16-13	8-6	20-16
x-Syracuse Nationals	41	31	.569	8	26-5	8-20	7-6	21-15
x-Philadelphia Warriors	37	35	.514	12	15-11	11-19	11-5	17-19
New York Knicks	35	37	.486	14	16-12	11-18	8-7	14-22

x – clinched playoff spot

=== Game log ===
1957–58 Game log
#	Date	Opponent	Score	High points	Record
1	October 23	N St. Louis	95–112	Ray Felix (22)	1–0
2	October 26	Boston	131–121	Guy Sparrow (24)	1–1
3	November 3	Philadelphia	105–123	Carl Braun (22)	2–1
4	November 7	@ Philadelphia	101–113	Ken Sears (26)	2–2
5	November 8	@ Syracuse	104–99	Carl Braun (19)	3–2
6	November 12	@ Detroit	107–109	Willie Naulls (24)	3–3
7	November 13	@ Minneapolis	106–124	Ron Sobieszczyk (21)	3–4
8	November 15	@ Cincinnati	99–101	Willie Naulls (24)	3–5
9	November 16	Detroit	109–105	Naulls, Sears (21)	3–6
10	November 19	@ St. Louis	115–118	Richie Guerin (20)	3–7
11	November 20	@ Minneapolis	105–101	Richie Guerin (22)	4–7
12	November 21	N Minneapolis	124–123 (OT)	Willie Naulls (33)	5–7
13	November 23	Syracuse	119–115	Ken Sears (33)	5–8
14	November 26	St. Louis	120–110	Willie Naulls (24)	5–9
15	November 27	@ Boston	107–120	Richie Guerin (25)	5–10
16	November 28	N Boston	97–80	Carl Braun (21)	6–10
17	November 30	@ Philadelphia	83–111	Ken Sears (17)	6–11
18	December 1	Detroit	102–109	Willie Naulls (25)	7–11
19	December 3	Cincinnati	104–110	Sears, Sobieszczyk (21)	8–11
20	December 6	@ Cincinnati	112–97	Richie Guerin (21)	9–11
21	December 8	@ St. Louis	113–110	Ron Sobieszczyk (32)	10–11
22	December 10	Boston	103–106	Richie Guerin (28)	11–11
23	December 11	N St. Louis	135–126	Guerin, Naulls (30)	11–12
24	December 14	@ St. Louis	124–136	Ken Sears (24)	11–13
25	December 15	@ Detroit	116–109	Carl Braun (24)	12–13
26	December 17	Syracuse	117–123	Ray Felix (24)	13–13
27	December 22	Philadelphia	100–126	Guerin, Sears (23)	14–13
28	December 25	@ Syracuse	130–134 (OT)	Guerin, Naulls (22)	14–14
29	December 26	@ Boston	110–120	Richie Guerin (22)	14–15
30	December 27	Detroit	120–125	Carl Braun (28)	15–15
31	December 28	@ Philadelphia	115–122	Carl Braun (27)	15–16
32	December 31	Minneapolis	116–142	Guerin, Sparrow (23)	16–16
33	January 2	N Syracuse	98–131	Carl Braun (27)	17–16
34	January 5	Cincinnati	101–100	Ray Felix (23)	17–17
35	January 7	St. Louis	114–112	Richie Guerin (26)	17–18
36	January 8	N Cincinnati	123–105	Ray Felix (26)	18–18
37	January 9	N Boston	136–123	Willie Naulls (33)	19–18
38	January 10	@ Cincinnati	104–107	Carl Braun (19)	19–19
39	January 12	Philadelphia	115–110 (OT)	Ken Sears (29)	19–20
40	January 14	N Cincinnati	111–117	Braun, Felix (20)	19–21
41	January 17	N Philadelphia	117–116	Willie Naulls (24)	19–22
42	January 18	Syracuse	120–123	Willie Naulls (31)	20–22
43	January 19	@ Syracuse	108–112	Ken Sears (21)	20–23
44	January 22	@ Detroit	115–92	Charlie Tyra (17)	21–23
45	January 24	@ Boston	104–125	Guy Sparrow (17)	21–24
46	January 25	Minneapolis	116–128	Ken Sears (28)	22–24
47	January 26	@ Minneapolis	109–106	Willie Naulls (23)	23–24
48	January 27	N Minneapolis	113–102	Richie Guerin (22)	24–24
49	January 28	Syracuse	110–102	Willie Naulls (29)	24–25
50	January 31	N Detroit	105–119	Braun, Naulls (26)	24–26
51	February 1	Boston	121–114	Carl Braun (28)	24–27
52	February 2	@ Philadelphia	120–131	Willie Naulls (22)	24–28
53	February 4	St. Louis	116–120	Willie Naulls (35)	25–28
54	February 7	N Syracuse	105–102	Carl Braun (27)	25–29
55	February 8	Minneapolis	93–94	Ken Sears (24)	26–29
56	February 9	@ Detroit	100–98	Carl Braun (20)	27–29
57	February 11	@ St. Louis	105–107	Ken Sears (26)	27–30
58	February 12	@ Minneapolis	106–97	Willie Naulls (28)	28–30
59	February 14	@ Cincinnati	103–92	Willie Naulls (21)	29–30
60	February 15	Cincinnati	97–99	Ken Sears (22)	30–30
61	February 18	Boston	113–111	Ken Sears (38)	30–31
62	February 19	@ Syracuse	110–116	Carl Braun (29)	30–32
63	February 21	@ Philadelphia	111–117 (OT)	Carl Braun (26)	30–33
64	February 22	Syracuse	112–115	Richie Guerin (29)	31–33
65	February 25	Philadelphia	132–110	Ken Sears (27)	31–34
66	February 26	N Philadelphia	96–112	Ken Sears (25)	32–34
67	March 1	Detroit	103–101	Felix, Sears (19)	32–35
68	March 4	Boston	99–104	Guy Sparrow (29)	33–35
69	March 5	@ Syracuse	91–102	Willie Naulls (21)	33–36
70	March 9	Philadelphia	81–123	Ken Sears (20)	34–36
71	March 11	@ Boston	119–126	Richie Guerin (31)	34–37
72	March 12	@ Boston	127–125	Richie Guerin (28)	35–37
