= Walter Scott Davis =

American politician

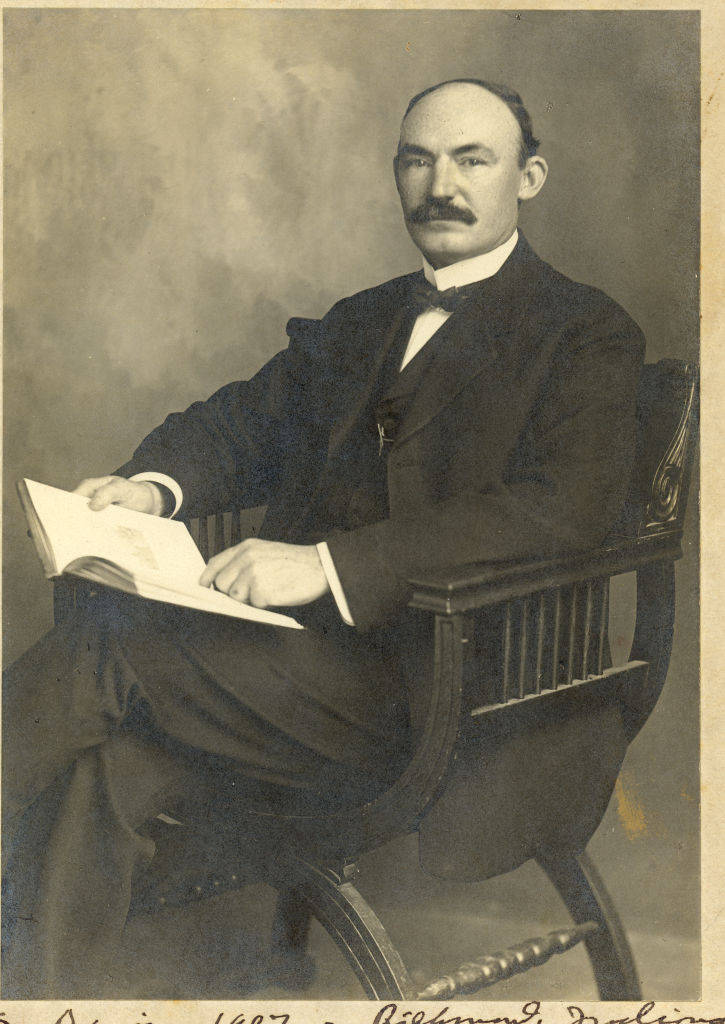
Portrait of Walter S. Davis, circa 1907

Walter Scott Davis (1866–1943) was a Washington state senator, a professor of history and political science at the College of Puget Sound in Tacoma (later renamed the University of Puget Sound), as well as a member of the Washington State Historical Society.

== Work as a senator ==
Davis was a Republican member of the Washington State Senate who represented Washington's 27th legislative district from 1912 to 1928, or the 13th legislative session through the 20th legislative session. In the session of 1916, Davis was appointed as the chairman of the Senate Committee on Education and Public Morals and introduced a bill to make courses in American government a requirement for graduation from high schools in Washington State.

== Teaching career ==
Davis began teaching at the college in 1906, eventually becoming the head of the history department. For the college's 50th anniversary, in 1938, Davis researched and wrote a historical account of its development, including its consolidation with Portland University in the college's early years, its move back to Tacoma following the consolidation, and the development of the school of music at the college, as well as the college's acceptance by, and involvement with, the larger Tacoma community.

As a historian himself, Davis volunteered as a curator for the Washington State Historical Society for almost 29 years, beginning in 1915.
