= 1957–58 Boston Celtics season =

NBA basketball team season

- Division champions
- Head coach: Red Auerbach
- Arena: Boston Garden

Results
- Record: 49–23 (.681)
- Place: Division: 1st (Eastern)
- Playoff finish: NBA Finals (lost to Hawks 2–4)
- Stats at Basketball Reference

The 1957–58 Boston Celtics season was the 12th season for the Celtics in the NBA. The Celtics made their second consecutive NBA Finals appearance, but were unable to defend their title, losing in a rematch of the Finals of the previous year to the St. Louis Hawks in six games.

== Roster ==
1957–58 Boston Celtics roster
Players

Pos.	No.	Player	Height	Weight	DOB	From
G	14	Bob Cousy	6 ft 1 in (1.85 m)	175 lb (79 kg)	1928-08-09	Holy Cross
F/C	15	Tom Heinsohn	6 ft 7 in (2.01 m)	218 lb (99 kg)	1934-08-26	Holy Cross
SG	24	Sam Jones	6 ft 4 in (1.93 m)	198 lb (90 kg)	1933-06-24	North Carolina Central
F	18	Jim Loscutoff	6 ft 5 in (1.96 m)	220 lb (100 kg)	1930-02-04	Oregon
F/C	16	Jack Nichols	6 ft 7 in (2.01 m)	222 lb (101 kg)	1926-04-09	Washington
G	17	Andy Phillip	6 ft 2 in (1.88 m)	195 lb (88 kg)	1922-03-07	Illinois
G/F	23	Frank Ramsey	6 ft 3 in (1.91 m)	190 lb (86 kg)	1931-07-13	Kentucky
F/C	19	Arnie Risen	6 ft 9 in (2.06 m)	200 lb (91 kg)	1924-10-09	Ohio State
C	6	Bill Russell	6 ft 9 in (2.06 m)	215 lb (98 kg)	1934-02-12	San Francisco
G	21	Bill Sharman	6 ft 1 in (1.85 m)	175 lb (79 kg)	1926-05-25	USC
F	29	Lou Tsioropoulos	6 ft 5 in (1.96 m)	190 lb (86 kg)	1930-08-31	Kentucky

Coaches
Head coach
- Red Auerbach

Legend
- (DP) Unsigned draft pick
- (FA) Free agent
- (S) Suspended
- Injured

Roster

== Season standings ==
Eastern Division	W	L	PCT	GB	Home	Road	Neutral	Div
x-Boston Celtics	49	23	.681	-	25-4	16-13	8-6	20-16
x-Syracuse Nationals	41	31	.569	8	26-5	8-20	7-6	21-15
x-Philadelphia Warriors	37	35	.514	12	15-11	11-19	11-5	17-19
New York Knicks	35	37	.486	14	16-12	11-18	8-7	14-22

x = clinched playoff spot

=== Game log ===
1957–58 game log
#	Date	Opponent	Score	High points	Record
1	October 22	@ St. Louis	115–90	Bob Cousy (24)	1–0
2	October 23	@ Detroit	105–94	Bill Sharman (24)	2–0
3	October 26	@ New York	131–121	Bob Cousy (33)	3–0
4	November 2	Syracuse	83–107	Frank Ramsey (27)	4–0
5	November 3	N Syracuse	95–113	Bill Sharman (27)	5–0
6	November 5	N Detroit	105–111	Bill Sharman (28)	6–0
7	November 6	@ Minneapolis	103–94	Bill Sharman (29)	7–0
8	November 8	@ Cincinnati	122–110 (OT)	Bill Sharman (34)	8–0
9	November 11	St. Louis	88–92	Heinsohn, Ramsey (20)	9–0
10	November 12	N Minneapolis	104–107	Bob Cousy (23)	10–0
11	November 16	Philadelphia	89–111	Bill Russell (28)	11–0
12	November 21	@ Detroit	112–90	Bill Sharman (26)	12–0
13	November 23	Minneapolis	107–131	Tom Heinsohn (27)	13–0
14	November 27	New York	107–120	Bill Russell (30)	14–0
15	November 28	N New York	97–80	Bill Sharman (19)	14–1
16	November 30	Syracuse	112–118	Bill Sharman (34)	15–1
17	December 1	@ Syracuse	109–118	Bill Russell (27)	15–2
18	December 3	@ Detroit	124–113	Frank Ramsey (35)	16–2
19	December 4	@ Minneapolis	108–98	Bill Sharman (20)	17–2
20	December 6	St. Louis	97–111	Ramsey, Sharman (31)	18–2
21	December 7	@ Philadelphia	112–106	Bill Sharman (26)	19–2
22	December 10	@ New York	103–106	Bill Russell (25)	19–3
23	December 11	Cincinnati	104–116	Tom Heinsohn (26)	20–3
24	December 12	N St. Louis	97–94	Bill Sharman (24)	20–4
25	December 14	Philadelphia	94–112	Bob Cousy (36)	21–4
26	December 21	Minneapolis	119–140	Bill Sharman (41)	22–4
27	December 22	@ Cincinnati	115–98	Bill Sharman (24)	23–4
28	December 25	@ Philadelphia	105–115	Bill Sharman (24)	23–5
29	December 26	New York	110–120	Bill Sharman (44)	24–5
30	December 27	N Philadelphia	110–106	Bob Cousy (28)	24–6
31	December 28	@ St. Louis	107–112	Tom Heinsohn (23)	24–7
32	January 4	@ Syracuse	106–115	Bill Russell (23)	24–8
33	January 5	N Minneapolis	100–113	Tom Heinsohn (25)	25–8
34	January 8	@ Minneapolis	107–87	Tom Heinsohn (16)	26–8
35	January 9	N New York	136–123	Bill Sharman (39)	26–9
36	January 11	@ St. Louis	98–102	Heinsohn, Risen (18)	26–10
37	January 12	@ Cincinnati	97–115	Bob Cousy (16)	26–11
38	January 15	Detroit	113–131	Heinsohn, Sharman (26)	27–11
39	January 17	Syracuse	99–120	Bill Sharman (30)	28–11
40	January 18	@ Philadelphia	104–116	Bill Sharman (29)	28–12
41	January 19	Philadelphia	113–114	Bob Cousy (27)	29–12
42	January 22	@ Minneapolis	97–87	Heinsohn, Ramsey (24)	30–12
43	January 24	New York	104–125	Tom Heinsohn (27)	31–12
44	January 25	@ Syracuse	100–112	Bill Sharman (33)	31–13
45	January 26	Syracuse	95–118	Bob Cousy (22)	32–13
46	January 29	St. Louis	101–111	Bob Cousy (39)	33–13
47	January 30	@ Philadelphia	96–116	Bill Sharman (17)	33–14
48	January 31	Philadelphia	110–101	Bill Russell (32)	33–15
49	February 1	@ New York	121–114	Bill Sharman (32)	34–15
50	February 2	Detroit	115–119	Frank Ramsey (32)	35–15
51	February 4	N Cincinnati	87–107	Tom Heinsohn (18)	36–15
52	February 5	Cincinnati	89–116	Tom Heinsohn (18)	37–15
53	February 7	Minneapolis	88–114	Tom Heinsohn (20)	38–15
54	February 8	N Cincinnati	91–109	Bob Cousy (38)	39–15
55	February 9	@ Syracuse	98–123	Bob Cousy (24)	39–16
56	February 11	N Syracuse	84–76	Bob Cousy (14)	39–17
57	February 12	Syracuse	101–119	Frank Ramsey (28)	40–17
58	February 14	Detroit	111–109	Bob Cousy (32)	40–18
59	February 15	@ Philadelphia	110–96	Frank Ramsey (35)	41–18
60	February 18	@ New York	113–111	Bob Cousy (27)	42–18
61	February 19	N Philadelphia	123–103	Tom Heinsohn (18)	42–19
62	February 20	Cincinnati	92–94	Frank Ramsey (27)	43–19
63	February 21	@ St. Louis	100–119	Tom Heinsohn (18)	43–20
64	February 23	N Philadelphia	97–99	Bob Cousy (30)	44–20
65	February 26	@ Detroit	106–99	Bill Russell (19)	45–20
66	March 2	@ Syracuse	107–100	Frank Ramsey (29)	46–20
67	March 4	@ New York	99–104	Heinsohn, Sharman (18)	46–21
68	March 5	St. Louis	102–109	Bob Cousy (22)	47–21
69	March 8	Detroit	103–108	Bob Cousy (28)	48–21
70	March 9	Cincinnati	121–107	Bill Russell (29)	48–22
71	March 11	New York	119–126	Cousy, Russell (22)	49–22
72	March 12	New York	127–125	Bill Sharman (27)	49–23

== Playoffs ==
1958 playoff game log
Division finals: 4–1 (home: 3–0; road: 1–1)

Game	Date	Team	Score	High points	High rebounds	High assists	Location	Series
1	March 19	Philadelphia	W 107–98	Bob Cousy (29)	Bill Russell (25)	Bob Cousy (8)	Boston Garden	1–0
2	March 22	@ Philadelphia	W 109–87	Bill Sharman (32)	Bill Russell (28)	Sharman, Cousy (4)	Philadelphia Civic Center	2–0
3	March 23	Philadelphia	W 106–92	Bill Sharman (27)	Bill Russell (40)	Bob Cousy (14)	Boston Garden	3–0
4	March 26	@ Philadelphia	L 97–112	Tom Heinsohn (20)	Bill Russell (21)	Cousy, Ramsey (5)	Philadelphia Civic Center	3–1
5	March 27	Philadelphia	W 93–88	Heinsohn, Ramsey (22)	Bill Russell (30)	Bob Cousy (5)	Boston Garden	4–1

NBA Finals: 2–4 (home: 1–2; road: 1–2)

Game	Date	Team	Score	High points	High rebounds	Location Attendance	Series
1	March 29	St. Louis	L 102–104	Bob Cousy (27)	Bill Russell (29)	Boston Garden; 3,652	0–1
2	March 30	St. Louis	W 136–112	Bob Cousy (25)	Bill Russell (27)	Boston Garden; 10,249	1–1
3	April 2	@ St. Louis	L 108–111	Frank Ramsey (29)	Bill Russell (13)	Kiel Auditorium; 10,148	1–2
4	April 5	@ St. Louis	W 109–98	Bob Cousy (24)	three players tied (13)	Kiel Auditorium; 10,216	2–2
5	April 9	St. Louis	L 100–102	Frank Ramsey (30)	Tom Heinsohn (20)	Boston Garden; 13,909	2–3
6	April 12	@ St. Louis	L 109–110	Bill Sharman (26)	Arnie Risen (13)	Kiel Auditorium; 10,216	2–4

1958 schedule

== Awards and records ==
- Bill Russell, NBA Most Valuable Player Award
- Bob Cousy, All-NBA First Team
- Bill Sharman, All-NBA First Team
- Bill Russell, All-NBA Second Team
