= 1957–58 Syracuse Nationals season =

Season for the Nationals in the National Basketball Association

- Head coach: Paul Seymour
- Arena: Onondaga War Memorial

Results
- Record: 41–31 (.569)
- Place: Division: 2nd (Eastern)
- Playoff finish: East Division Semifinals (eliminated 1–2)
- Stats at Basketball Reference

The 1957–58 Syracuse Nationals season was the Nationals' 9th season in the NBA.

== Roster ==
1957-58 Syracuse Nationals roster
Players

Pos.	No.	Player	Height	Weight	DOB	From
SG	16	Al Bianchi	6 ft 3 in (1.91 m)	185 lb (84 kg)	1932-03-26	Bowling Green
SF	8	Ed Conlin	6 ft 5 in (1.96 m)	200 lb (91 kg)	1933-09-02	Fordham
PG	6	Larry Costello	6 ft 1 in (1.85 m)	186 lb (84 kg)	1931-07-02	Niagara
SG	3	Bob Harrison	6 ft 1 in (1.85 m)	190 lb (86 kg)	1927-08-12	Michigan
SF	12	Joe Holup	6 ft 6 in (1.98 m)	215 lb (98 kg)	1934-02-26	George Washington
PF	9	Bob Hopkins	6 ft 8 in (2.03 m)	205 lb (93 kg)	1934-11-03	Grambling State
C	10	Red Kerr	6 ft 9 in (2.06 m)	230 lb (104 kg)	1932-07-17	Illinois
SF	8	Earl Lloyd	6 ft 5 in (1.96 m)	200 lb (91 kg)	1928-04-03	West Virginia State
SF	6	Togo Palazzi	6 ft 4 in (1.93 m)	205 lb (93 kg)	1932-08-08	Holy Cross
PF	4	Dolph Schayes	6 ft 8 in (2.03 m)	220 lb (100 kg)	1928-05-19	NYU
PG	5	Paul Seymour	6 ft 1 in (1.85 m)	180 lb (82 kg)	1928-01-30	Toledo

Coaches
Head coach

Paul Seymour

Legend
- (DP) Unsigned draft pick
- (FA) Free agent
- (S) Suspended
- Injured

Roster

== Regular season ==
=== Season standings ===
Eastern Division	W	L	PCT	GB	Home	Road	Neutral	Div
x-Boston Celtics	49	23	.681	-	25-4	16-13	8-6	20-16
x-Syracuse Nationals	41	31	.569	8	26-5	8-20	7-6	21-15
x-Philadelphia Warriors	37	35	.514	12	15-11	11-19	11-5	17-19
New York Knicks	35	37	.486	14	16-12	11-18	8-7	14-22

x – clinched playoff spot

=== Game log ===
1957–58 Game log
#	Date	Opponent	Score	High points	Record
1	October 25	Philadelphia	85–103	Johnny Kerr (22)	1–0
2	October 26	@ Cincinnati	100–110	Dolph Schayes (32)	1–1
3	November 1	Minneapolis	100–113	Lloyd, Schayes (22)	2–1
4	November 2	@ Boston	83–107	Dolph Schayes (24)	2–2
5	November 3	N Boston	95–113	Bob Hopkins (23)	2–3
6	November 5	@ St. Louis	101–115	Dolph Schayes (20)	2–4
7	November 8	New York	104–99	Dolph Schayes (33)	2–5
8	November 14	@ Philadelphia	97–94	Dolph Schayes (29)	3–5
9	November 15	St. Louis	86–91	Dolph Schayes (24)	4–5
10	November 16	@ St. Louis	101–118	Dolph Schayes (29)	4–6
11	November 17	@ Minneapolis	110–98	Kerr, Schayes (28)	5–6
12	November 22	Cincinnati	102–98	Dolph Schayes (24)	5–7
13	November 23	@ New York	119–115	Johnny Kerr (28)	6–7
14	November 27	Philadelphia	87–92	Dolph Schayes (20)	7–7
15	November 28	@ Philadelphia	98–102	Dolph Schayes (25)	7–8
16	November 30	@ Boston	112–118	Ed Conlin (25)	7–9
17	December 1	Boston	109–118	Dolph Schayes (37)	8–9
18	December 3	N Philadelphia	119–96	Dolph Schayes (27)	9–9
19	December 6	Detroit	91–118	Larry Costello (20)	10–9
20	December 7	@ Minneapolis	113–121	Dolph Schayes (31)	10–10
21	December 10	N Minneapolis	114–104	Dolph Schayes (26)	11–10
22	December 11	@ Minneapolis	95–110	Ed Conlin (23)	11–11
23	December 14	N Cincinnati	104–100	Johnny Kerr (22)	12–11
24	December 15	Cincinnati	83–109	Larry Costello (24)	13–11
25	December 17	@ New York	117–123	Dolph Schayes (30)	13–12
26	December 20	@ Cincinnati	122–113	Johnny Kerr (42)	14–12
27	December 21	N St. Louis	136–146	Dolph Schayes (35)	14–13
28	December 22	Detroit	93–119	Johnny Kerr (26)	15–13
29	December 25	New York	130–134 (OT)	Dolph Schayes (33)	16–13
30	December 26	N Cincinnati	104–100	Johnny Kerr (26)	17–13
31	December 28	@ Detroit	111–117	Dolph Schayes (24)	17–14
32	December 29	Philadelphia	97–105	Dolph Schayes (23)	18–14
33	January 1	Minneapolis	109–120	Dolph Schayes (21)	19–14
34	January 2	N New York	98–131	Ed Conlin (23)	19–15
35	January 4	Boston	106–115	Dolph Schayes (34)	20–15
36	January 5	@ Philadelphia	111–96	Larry Costello (33)	21–15
37	January 8	@ Detroit	107–109	Dolph Schayes (31)	21–16
38	January 9	Minneapolis	122–127	Ed Conlin (26)	22–16
39	January 11	@ Cincinnati	100–105	Dolph Schayes (32)	22–17
40	January 12	Detroit	109–135	Larry Costello (26)	23–17
41	January 16	St. Louis	96–112	Dolph Schayes (31)	24–17
42	January 17	@ Boston	99–120	Dolph Schayes (27)	24–18
43	January 18	@ New York	120–123	Togo Palazzi (31)	24–19
44	January 19	New York	108–112	Dolph Schayes (33)	25–19
45	January 22	Cincinnati	115–109	Dolph Schayes (36)	25–20
46	January 23	@ Philadelphia	101–88	Dolph Schayes (35)	26–20
47	January 25	Boston	100–112	Dolph Schayes (31)	27–20
48	January 26	@ Boston	95–118	Ed Conlin (22)	27–21
49	January 28	@ New York	110–102	Dolph Schayes (28)	28–21
50	January 30	N Detroit	83–87	Dolph Schayes (23)	28–22
51	February 1	@ Minneapolis	97–91	Dolph Schayes (29)	29–22
52	February 2	@ St. Louis	102–100	Dolph Schayes (35)	30–22
53	February 4	@ Detroit	113–118	Ed Conlin (24)	30–23
54	February 7	N New York	105–102	Larry Costello (27)	31–23
55	February 8	St. Louis	103–102	Dolph Schayes (33)	31–24
56	February 9	Boston	98–123	Dolph Schayes (25)	32–24
57	February 11	N Boston	84–76	Larry Costello (28)	33–24
58	February 12	@ Boston	101–119	Ed Conlin (25)	33–25
59	February 13	Philadelphia	98–108	Dolph Schayes (38)	34–25
60	February 16	Cincinnati	105–113	Dolph Schayes (25)	35–25
61	February 18	@ Detroit	98–120	Al Bianchi (22)	35–26
62	February 19	New York	110–116	Johnny Kerr (31)	36–26
63	February 20	N Philadelphia	97–110	Togo Palazzi (28)	36–27
64	February 22	@ New York	112–115	Kerr, Schayes (24)	36–28
65	February 23	St. Louis	92–101	Dolph Schayes (30)	37–28
66	February 26	Minneapolis	90–119	Costello, Schayes (20)	38–28
67	February 27	@ Philadelphia	91–97	Ed Conlin (17)	38–29
68	March 2	Boston	107–100	Dolph Schayes (34)	38–30
69	March 5	New York	91–102	Dolph Schayes (20)	39–30
70	March 7	@ St. Louis	100–102	Dolph Schayes (27)	39–31
71	March 9	Detroit	90–111	Dolph Schayes (23)	40–31
72	March 12	Philadelphia	99–110	Harrison, Schayes (13)	41–31

== Playoffs ==
1958 playoff game log
Division Semifinals: 1–2 (home: 1–1; road: 0–1)

Game	Date	Team	Score	High points	High rebounds	High assists	Location	Series
1	March 15	Philadelphia	W 86–82	Dolph Schayes (22)	Red Kerr (22)	Schayes, Costello (4)	Onondaga War Memorial	1–0
2	March 16	@ Philadelphia	L 93–95	Dolph Schayes (32)	Red Kerr (20)	Paul Seymour (4)	Philadelphia Civic Center	1–1
3	March 18	Philadelphia	L 88–101	Dolph Schayes (26)	Red Kerr (19)	Larry Costello (7)	Onondaga War Memorial	1–2

1958 schedule

== Awards and records ==
- Dolph Schayes, All-NBA First Team
