= 1957–58 Philadelphia Warriors season =

NBA professional basketball team season

- Head coach: George Senesky
- Arena: Philadelphia Civic Center

Results
- Record: 37–35 (.514)
- Place: Division: 3rd (Eastern)
- Playoff finish: East Division Finals (lost to Celtics 1–4)
- Stats at Basketball Reference

Local media
- Television: WVUE (Jim Leaming & Bill Pfeiffer)
- Radio: WCAU (Bill Campbell & Tommy Roberts)

The 1957–58 Philadelphia Warriors season was the Warriors' 12th season in the NBA.

== Roster ==
1957–58 Philadelphia Warriors roster
Players

Pos.	No.	Player	Height	Weight	DOB	From
F	11	Paul Arizin	6 ft 4 in (1.93 m)	190 lb (86 kg)		Villanova
G	7	Ernie Beck	6 ft 4 in (1.93 m)	190 lb (86 kg)		Penn
G	5	George Dempsey	6 ft 2 in (1.88 m)	190 lb (86 kg)		King's (NY)
G	19	Pat Dunn	6 ft 2 in (1.88 m)	170 lb (77 kg)		Utah State
G	17	Jack George	6 ft 2 in (1.88 m)	190 lb (86 kg)		La Salle
G/F	15	Tom Gola	6 ft 6 in (1.98 m)	205 lb (93 kg)		La Salle
F/C	9	Joe Graboski	6 ft 7 in (2.01 m)	195 lb (88 kg)		Tuley HS (IL)
C	6	Neil Johnston	6 ft 8 in (2.03 m)	210 lb (95 kg)		Ohio State
F	19	Ray Radziszewski	6 ft 5 in (1.96 m)	210 lb (95 kg)		Saint Joseph's
F	18	Lennie Rosenbluth	6 ft 4 in (1.93 m)	190 lb (86 kg)		North Carolina
F/C	14	Woody Sauldsberry	6 ft 7 in (2.01 m)	220 lb (100 kg)		Texas Southern
F	20	Walsh, Jim	6 ft 4 in (1.93 m)	195 lb (88 kg)		Stanford

Coaches
Head coach
- George Senesky (Saint Joseph's)

Legend
- (DP) Unsigned draft pick
- (FA) Free agent
- (S) Suspended
- Injured

== Regular season ==
=== Season standings ===
Eastern Division	W	L	PCT	GB	Home	Road	Neutral	Div
x-Boston Celtics	49	23	.681	-	25-4	16-13	8-6	20-16
x-Syracuse Nationals	41	31	.569	8	26-5	8-20	7-6	21-15
x-Philadelphia Warriors	37	35	.514	12	15-11	11-19	11-5	17-19
New York Knicks	35	37	.486	14	16-12	11-18	8-7	14-22

x – clinched playoff spot

=== Game log ===
1957–58 Game log
#	Date	Opponent	Score	High points	Record
1	October 25	@ Syracuse	85–103	Neil Johnston (22)	0–1
2	October 26	@ Detroit	112–100	Neil Johnston (25)	1–1
3	November 2	Minneapolis	108–118	Neil Johnston (23)	2–1
4	November 3	@ New York	105–123	Neil Johnston (31)	2–2
5	November 7	New York	101–113	Neil Johnston (34)	3–2
6	November 8	N Minneapolis	119–108	Joe Graboski (34)	4–2
7	November 9	@ St. Louis	100–105	Graboski, Johnston (26)	4–3
8	November 10	@ Cincinnati	106–101	Neil Johnston (34)	5–3
9	November 14	Syracuse	97–94	Woody Sauldsberry (21)	5–4
10	November 16	@ Boston	89–111	Joe Graboski (23)	5–5
11	November 17	Detroit	95–91	Ernie Beck (22)	5–6
12	November 20	Cincinnati	99–89	Neil Johnston (26)	5–7
13	November 24	Minneapolis	98–105	Neil Johnston (28)	6–7
14	November 27	@ Syracuse	87–92	Neil Johnston (27)	6–8
15	November 28	Syracuse	98–102	Graboski, Johnston (24)	7–8
16	November 30	New York	83–111	Neil Johnston (32)	8–8
17	December 3	N Syracuse	119–96	Paul Arizin (22)	8–9
18	December 5	St. Louis	109–124	Ernie Beck (27)	9–9
19	December 7	Boston	112–106	Paul Arizin (33)	9–10
20	December 8	@ Cincinnati	88–99	Joe Graboski (19)	9–11
21	December 10	@ Detroit	100–97	Tom Gola (19)	10–11
22	December 12	Detroit	101–96	Paul Arizin (24)	10–12
23	December 14	@ Boston	94–112	Paul Arizin (20)	10–13
24	December 18	@ Minneapolis	102–108	Neil Johnston (30)	10–14
25	December 22	@ New York	100–126	Arizin, Rosenbluth (17)	10–15
26	December 25	Boston	105–115	Paul Arizin (35)	11–15
27	December 27	N Boston	110–106	Paul Arizin (25)	12–15
28	December 28	New York	115–122	Joe Graboski (35)	13–15
29	December 29	@ Syracuse	97–105	Paul Arizin (31)	13–16
30	January 2	St. Louis	93–95	Arizin, Johnston (22)	14–16
31	January 3	@ Cincinnati	94–106	Neil Johnston (13)	14–17
32	January 4	@ Detroit	78–81	Tom Gola (18)	14–18
33	January 5	Syracuse	111–96	Woody Sauldsberry (28)	14–19
34	January 10	St. Louis	93–124	Paul Arizin (21)	15–19
35	January 12	@ New York	115–110 (OT)	Neil Johnston (33)	16–19
36	January 14	@ St. Louis	110–109	Neil Johnston (33)	17–19
37	January 16	Detroit	113–108	Paul Arizin (24)	17–20
38	January 17	N New York	117–116	Tom Gola (27)	18–20
39	January 18	Boston	104–116	Neil Johnston (31)	19–20
40	January 19	@ Boston	113–114	Neil Johnston (26)	19–21
41	January 23	Syracuse	101–88	Paul Arizin (20)	19–22
42	January 24	@ Cincinnati	102–92	Neil Johnston (33)	20–22
43	January 26	@ St. Louis	125–112	Neil Johnston (26)	21–22
44	January 27	@ Detroit	93–115	Tom Gola (18)	21–23
45	January 28	N St. Louis	123–109	Paul Arizin (25)	21–24
46	January 30	Boston	96–116	Arizin, Sauldsberry (19)	22–24
47	January 31	@ Boston	110–101	Paul Arizin (25)	23–24
48	February 1	N Detroit	106–86	Neil Johnston (20)	24–24
49	February 2	New York	120–131	Paul Arizin (22)	25–24
50	February 4	N Minneapolis	107–103	Paul Arizin (32)	26–24
51	February 5	@ Minneapolis	112–102	Neil Johnston (24)	27–24
52	February 7	Cincinnati	103–100	Johnston, Sauldsberry (20)	27–25
53	February 9	St. Louis	98–105	Paul Arizin (25)	28–25
54	February 11	Detroit	98–115	Paul Arizin (25)	29–25
55	February 13	@ Syracuse	98–108	Paul Arizin (33)	29–26
56	February 15	Boston	110–96	Paul Arizin (26)	29–27
57	February 16	@ Minneapolis	99–106	Paul Arizin (26)	29–28
58	February 19	N Boston	123–103	Woody Sauldsberry (24)	30–28
59	February 20	N Syracuse	97–110	Woody Sauldsberry (34)	31–28
60	February 21	New York	111–117 (OT)	Jack George (26)	32–28
61	February 23	N Boston	97–99	Woody Sauldsberry (26)	32–29
62	February 24	N Minneapolis	110–95	Paul Arizin (29)	33–29
63	February 25	@ New York	132–110	Jack George (31)	34–29
64	February 26	N New York	96–112	Arizin, Gola, Graboski (18)	34–30
65	February 27	Syracuse	91–97	Paul Arizin (23)	35–30
66	March 1	Cincinnati	101–88	Neil Johnston (25)	35–31
67	March 2	@ Minneapolis	92–102	Paul Arizin (32)	35–32
68	March 4	N Cincinnati	97–91	Jack George (24)	36–32
69	March 6	Cincinnati	110–108	Paul Arizin (36)	36–33
70	March 9	@ New York	81–123	Ernie Beck (19)	36–34
71	March 11	@ St. Louis	106–101	Neil Johnston (19)	37–34
72	March 12	@ Syracuse	99–110	Paul Arizin (25)	37–35

== Playoffs ==
1958 playoff game log
Division Semifinals: 2–1 (home: 1–0; road: 1–1)

Game	Date	Team	Score	High points	High rebounds	High assists	Location	Series
1	March 15	@ Syracuse	L 82–86	Paul Arizin (24)	Graboski, Gola (13)	Jack George (5)	Onondaga War Memorial	0–1
2	March 16	Syracuse	W 95–93	Joe Graboski (23)	Woody Sauldsberry (14)	George, Gola (5)	Philadelphia Civic Center	1–1
3	March 18	@ Syracuse	W 101–88	Paul Arizin (25)	Joe Graboski (15)	Joe Graboski (7)	Onondaga War Memorial	2–1

Division Finals: 1–4 (home: 1–1; road: 0–3)

Game	Date	Team	Score	High points	High rebounds	High assists	Location	Series
1	March 19	@ Boston	L 98–107	Woody Sauldsberry (25)	Woody Sauldsberry (12)	Paul Arizin (5)	Boston Garden	0–1
2	March 22	Boston	L 87–109	Paul Arizin (25)	Joe Graboski (15)	George, Beck (4)	Philadelphia Civic Center	0–2
3	March 23	@ Boston	L 92–106	Paul Arizin (25)	Joe Graboski (15)	Joe Graboski (8)	Boston Garden	0–3
4	March 26	Boston	W 112–97	Gola, Arizin (31)	Neil Johnston (17)	Neil Johnston (7)	Philadelphia Civic Center	1–3
5	March 27	@ Boston	L 88–93	Paul Arizin (28)	Woody Sauldsberry (18)	Tom Gola (6)	Boston Garden	1–4

1958 schedule

== Awards and records ==
- Paul Arizin, NBA All-Star Game
- Neil Johnston, NBA All-Star Game
- Woody Sauldsberry, NBA Rookie of the Year Award
- Tom Gola, All-NBA Second Team
