= 1958 NBA playoffs =

Playoffs of the 12th NBA championships (1957-58)

Tournament details
- Dates: March 15 – April 12, 1958
- Season: 1957–58
- Teams: 6

Final positions
- Champions: St. Louis Hawks (1st title)
- Runners-up: Boston Celtics
- Semifinalists: Detroit Pistons; Philadelphia Warriors

Tournament statistics
- Scoring leader(s): Cliff Hagan (Hawks) (27.7 PPG)

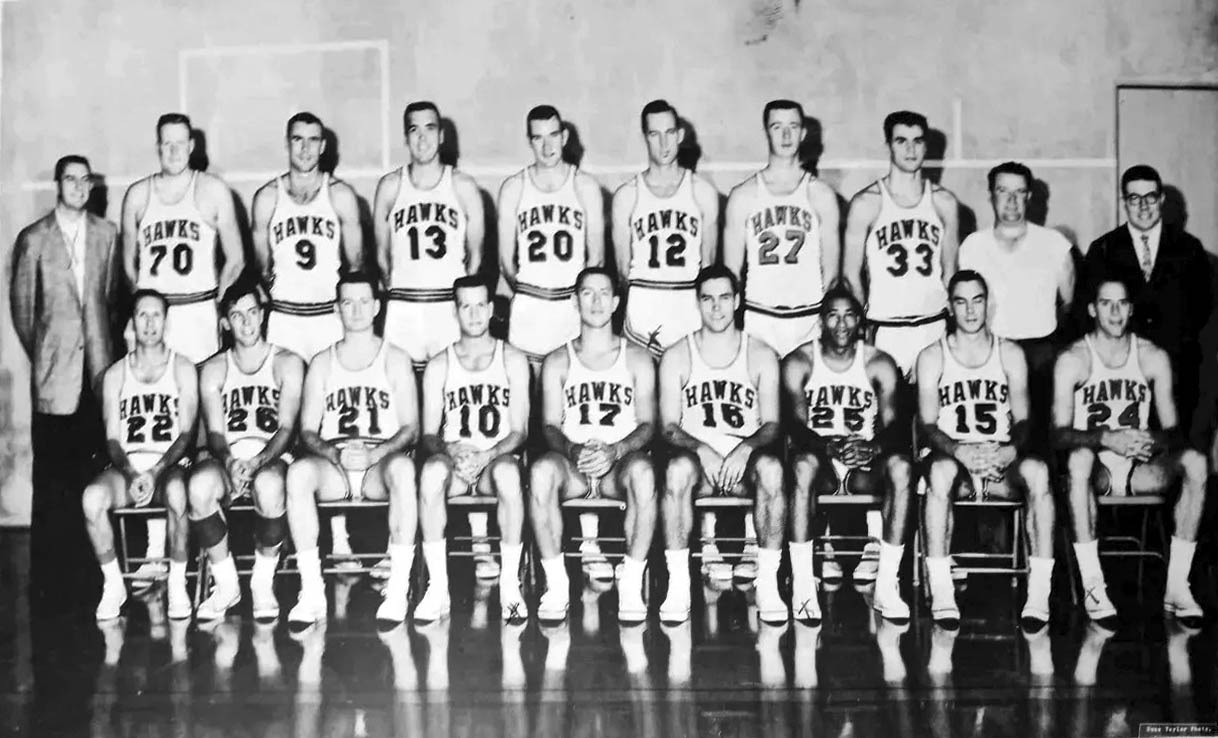
St. Louis, champions

The 1958 NBA playoffs was the postseason tournament of the National Basketball Association's 1957–58 season. The tournament concluded with the Western Division champion St. Louis Hawks defeating the Eastern Division champion Boston Celtics 4 games to 2 in the NBA Finals.

It was the second straight year the Celtics and Hawks met in the Finals; they met four out of five years, with the Celtics winning three series and the Hawks one.

This was the first (and as of 2026, only) title in Hawks franchise history. St. Louis made it to the NBA Finals four times in five years between 1957–1961, but since moving to Atlanta in 1968, they have had considerably less success in the playoffs.

== Bracket ==
Division Semifinals
E3	Philadelphia	2
E2	Syracuse	1
W3	Cincinnati	0
W2	Detroit	2

Division Finals
Eastern Division
E1	Boston*	4
E3	Philadelphia	1
Western Division
W1	St. Louis*	4
W2	Detroit	1

NBA Finals
E1	Boston*	2
W1	St. Louis*	4

- * Division winner
- Bold Series winner
- Italic Team with home-court advantage in NBA Finals

== Division Semifinals ==
=== Eastern Division Semifinals ===
==== (2) Syracuse Nationals vs. (3) Philadelphia Warriors ====
March 15

Boxscore

Philadelphia Warriors 82, Syracuse Nationals 86
Scoring by quarter: 20–31, 24–18, 22–18, 16–19
Pts: Paul Arizin 24; Rebs: Graboski, Gola 13 each Asts: Jack George 5	Pts: Dolph Schayes 22; Rebs: Red Kerr 22; Asts: Schayes, Costello 4 each
Syracuse leads series, 1–0

Onondaga War Memorial, Syracuse, New York

March 16

Boxscore

Syracuse Nationals 93, Philadelphia Warriors 95
Scoring by quarter: 16–21, 22–25, 29–23, 26–26
Pts: Dolph Schayes 32; Rebs: Red Kerr 20; Asts: Paul Seymour 4	Pts: Joe Graboski 23; Rebs: Woody Sauldsberry 14; Asts: George, Gola 5 each
Series tied, 1–1

Philadelphia Civic Center, Philadelphia, Pennsylvania

March 18

Boxscore

Philadelphia Warriors 101, Syracuse Nationals 88
Scoring by quarter: 26–27, 25–19, 24–27, 26–15
Pts: Paul Arizin 25; Rebs: Joe Graboski 15; Asts: Joe Graboski 7	Pts: Dolph Schayes 26; Rebs: Red Kerr 19; Asts: Larry Costello 7
Philadelphia wins series, 2–1

Onondaga War Memorial, Syracuse, New York

This was the sixth playoff meeting between these two teams, with the 76ers/Nationals winning four of the first five meetings.

Previous playoff series
Philadelphia 76ers/ Syracuse Nationals leads 4–1 in all-time playoff series

1950

Philadelphia Warriors 0, Syracuse Nationals 2

1950 Eastern Division Semifinals

1951

Philadelphia Warriors 0, Syracuse Nationals 2

1951 Eastern Division Semifinals

1952

Philadelphia Warriors 1, Syracuse Nationals 2

1952 Eastern Division Semifinals

1956

Philadelphia Warriors 3, Syracuse Nationals 2

1956 Eastern Division Finals

1957

Philadelphia Warriors 0, Syracuse Nationals 2

1957 Eastern Division Semifinals

=== Western Division Semifinals ===
==== (2) Detroit Pistons vs. (3) Cincinnati Royals ====
March 15

Boxscore

Cincinnati Royals 83, Detroit Pistons 100
Scoring by quarter: 18–32, 18–24, 29–19, 18–25
Pts: Clyde Lovellette 15	Pts: George Yardley 29
Detroit leads series, 1–0

Detroit Olympia, Detroit, Michigan

March 16

Boxscore

Detroit Pistons 124, Cincinnati Royals 104
Scoring by quarter: 29–20, 28–27, 28–27, 39–30
Pts: Yardley, Dukes 24 each	Pts: Jack Twyman 24
Detroit wins series, 2–0

Cincinnati Gardens, Cincinnati, Ohio

This was the sixth playoff meeting between these two teams, with the Royals winning three of the first five meetings while the Pistons were based in Fort Wayne and the Royals were based in Rochester.

Previous playoff series
Cincinnati/ Rochester leads 3–2 in all-time playoff series

1950

Fort Wayne Pistons 2, Rochester Royals 0

1950 Central Division Semifinals

1951

Fort Wayne Pistons 1, Rochester Royals 2

1951 Western Division Semifinals

1952

Fort Wayne Pistons 0, Rochester Royals 2

1952 Western Division Semifinals

1953

Fort Wayne Pistons 2, Rochester Royals 0

1953 Western Division Semifinals

1954

Fort Wayne Pistons 0, Rochester Royals 2

1954 Western Division Round Robin Semifinals

== Division Finals ==
=== Eastern Division Finals ===
==== (1) Boston Celtics vs. (3) Philadelphia Warriors ====
March 19

Boxscore

Philadelphia Warriors 98, Boston Celtics 107
Scoring by quarter: 20–33, 25–26, 24–25, 29–23
Pts: Woody Sauldsberry 25; Rebs: Woody Sauldsberry 12; Asts: Paul Arizin 5	Pts: Bob Cousy 29; Rebs: Bill Russell 25; Asts: Bob Cousy 8
Boston leads series, 1–0

Boston Garden, Boston, Massachusetts

March 22

Boxscore

Boston Celtics 109, Philadelphia Warriors 87
Scoring by quarter: 18–21, 30–28, 30–21, 31–17
Pts: Bill Sharman 32; Rebs: Bill Russell 28; Asts: Sharman, Cousy 4 each	Pts: Paul Arizin 25; Rebs: Joe Graboski 15; Asts: George, Beck 4 each
Boston leads series, 2–0

Philadelphia Civic Center, Philadelphia, Pennsylvania

March 23

Boxscore

Philadelphia Warriors 92, Boston Celtics 106
Scoring by quarter: 28–26, 20–22, 20–28, 24–30
Pts: Paul Arizin 25; Rebs: Joe Graboski 15; Asts: Joe Graboski 8	Pts: Bill Sharman 27; Rebs: Bill Russell 40; Asts: Bob Cousy 14
Boston leads series, 3–0

Boston Garden, Boston, Massachusetts

March 26

Boxscore

Boston Celtics 97, Philadelphia Warriors 112
Scoring by quarter: 16–23, 25–22, 29–34, 27–33
Pts: Tom Heinsohn 20; Rebs: Bill Russell 21; Asts: Cousy, Ramsey 5 each	Pts: Gola, Arizin 31 each Rebs: Neil Johnston 17; Asts: Neil Johnston 7
Boston leads series, 3–1

Philadelphia Civic Center, Philadelphia, Pennsylvania

March 27

Boxscore

Philadelphia Warriors 88, Boston Celtics 93
Scoring by quarter: 15–20, 29–21, 23–25, 21–27
Pts: Paul Arizin 28; Rebs: Woody Sauldsberry 18; Asts: Tom Gola 6	Pts: Heinsohn, Ramsey 22 each Rebs: Bill Russell 30; Asts: Bob Cousy 5
Boston wins series, 4–1

Boston Garden, Boston, Massachusetts

This was the first playoff meeting between these two teams.

=== Western Division Finals ===
==== (1) St. Louis Hawks vs. (2) Detroit Pistons ====
March 19

Boxscore

Detroit Pistons 111, St. Louis Hawks 114
Scoring by quarter: 30–23, 32–35, 28–26, 21–30
Pts: Gene Shue 29	Pts: Cliff Hagan 38
St. Louis leads series, 1–0

Kiel Auditorium, St. Louis, Missouri
Attendance: 7,328
Referees: Mendy Rudolph, Jim Duffy

March 22

Boxscore

St. Louis Hawks 99, Detroit Pistons 96
Scoring by quarter: 29–28, 32–22, 13–27, 25–19
Pts: Cliff Hagan 27	Pts: George Yardley 26
St. Louis leads series, 2–0

University of Detroit Fieldhouse, Detroit, Michigan
Referees: Mendy Rudolph, Jim Duffy

March 23

Boxscore

Detroit Pistons 109, St. Louis Hawks 89
Scoring by quarter: 35–21, 20–23, 23–15, 31–30
Pts: George Yardley 31	Pts: Cliff Hagan 29
St. Louis leads series, 2–1

Kiel Auditorium, St. Louis, Missouri
Attendance: 9,321
Referees: Mendy Rudolph, Jim Duffy

March 25

Boxscore

St. Louis Hawks 145, Detroit Pistons 101
Scoring by quarter: 40–20, 32–24, 31–26, 42–31
Pts: Cliff Hagan 28	Pts: Yardley, Dukes 16 each
St. Louis leads series, 3–1

Detroit Olympia, Detroit, Michigan

March 27

Boxscore

Detroit Pistons 96, St. Louis Hawks 120
Scoring by quarter: 20–18, 22–31, 26–39, 28–32
Pts: Yardley, Dukes 18 each	Pts: Cliff Hagan 32
St. Louis wins series, 4–1

Kiel Auditorium, St. Louis, Missouri
Attendance: 7,661
Referees: Mendy Rudolph, Jim Duffy

This was the second playoff meeting between these two teams, with the Pistons winning the first meeting while being based in Fort Wayne.

Previous playoff series
Detroit/ Fort Wayne leads 1–0 in all-time playoff series

1956

Fort Wayne Pistons 3, St. Louis Hawks 2

1956 Western Division Finals

== NBA Finals: (E1) Boston Celtics vs. (W1) St. Louis Hawks ==
March 29

Boxscore

St. Louis Hawks 104, Boston Celtics 102
Scoring by quarter: 17–23, 42–30, 21–30, 24–19
Pts: Cliff Hagan 33; Rebs: Bob Pettit 19	Pts: Bob Cousy 27; Rebs: Bill Russell 29
St. Louis leads series, 1–0

Boston Garden, Boston, Massachusetts
Attendance: 3,652
Referees: Arnie Heft, Mendy Rudolph

March 30

Boxscore

St. Louis Hawks 112, Boston Celtics 136
Scoring by quarter: 25–33, 35–35, 28–38, 24–30
Pts: Cliff Hagan 37; Rebs: Cliff Hagan 12	Pts: Bob Cousy 25; Rebs: Bill Russell 27
Series tied, 1–1

Boston Garden, Boston, Massachusetts
Attendance: 10,249

April 2

Boxscore

Boston Celtics 108, St. Louis Hawks 111
Scoring by quarter: 25–23, 24–26, 26–34, 33–28
Pts: Frank Ramsey 29; Rebs: Bill Russell 13	Pts: Bob Pettit 32; Rebs: Bob Pettit 19
St. Louis leads series, 2–1

Kiel Auditorium, St. Louis, Missouri
Attendance: 10,148

April 5

Boxscore

Boston Celtics 109, St. Louis Hawks 98
Scoring by quarter: 25–16, 32–35, 27–20, 25–27
Pts: Bob Cousy 24; Rebs: three players 13 each	Pts: Cliff Hagan 27; Rebs: Bob Pettit 17
Series tied, 2–2

Kiel Auditorium, St. Louis, Missouri
Attendance: 10,216

April 9

Boxscore

St. Louis Hawks 102, Boston Celtics 100
Scoring by quarter: 26–18, 32–25, 26–27, 18–30
Pts: Bob Pettit 33; Rebs: Bob Pettit 21	Pts: Frank Ramsey 30; Rebs: Tom Heinsohn 20
St. Louis leads series, 3–2

Boston Garden, Boston, Massachusetts
Attendance: 13,909

April 12

Boxscore

Boston Celtics 109, St. Louis Hawks 110
Scoring by quarter: 18–22, 34–35, 25–21, 32–32
Pts: Bill Sharman 26; Rebs: Arnie Risen 13	Pts: Bob Pettit 50; Rebs: Bob Pettit 19
St. Louis wins series, 4–2

Kiel Auditorium, St. Louis, Missouri
Attendance: 10,216

- Andy Phillip and Arnie Risen’s final NBA game.
- Bob Pettit's 50 points tied the then-NBA playoff record at the time.

This was the second playoff meeting between these two teams, with the Celtics winning the first meeting.

Previous playoff series
Boston leads 1–0 in all-time playoff series

1957

Boston Celtics 4, St. Louis Hawks 3

1957 NBA Finals
