= 1957–58 NBA season =

12th NBA season

- League: National Basketball Association
- Sport: Basketball
- Duration: October 22, 1957 – March 12, 1958; March 15–27, 1958 (Playoffs); March 29 – April 12, 1958 (Finals)
- Games: 72
- Teams: 8
- TV partner: NBC

Draft
- Top draft pick: Rod Hundley
- Picked by: Cincinnati Royals

Regular season
- Top seed: Boston Celtics
- Season MVP: Bill Russell (Boston)
- Top scorer: George Yardley (Detroit)

Playoffs
- Eastern champions: Boston Celtics
- Eastern runners-up: Philadelphia Warriors
- Western champions: St. Louis Hawks
- Western runners-up: Detroit Pistons

Finals
- Champions: St. Louis Hawks
- Runners-up: Boston Celtics

NBA seasons
- ← 1956–57 1958–59 →

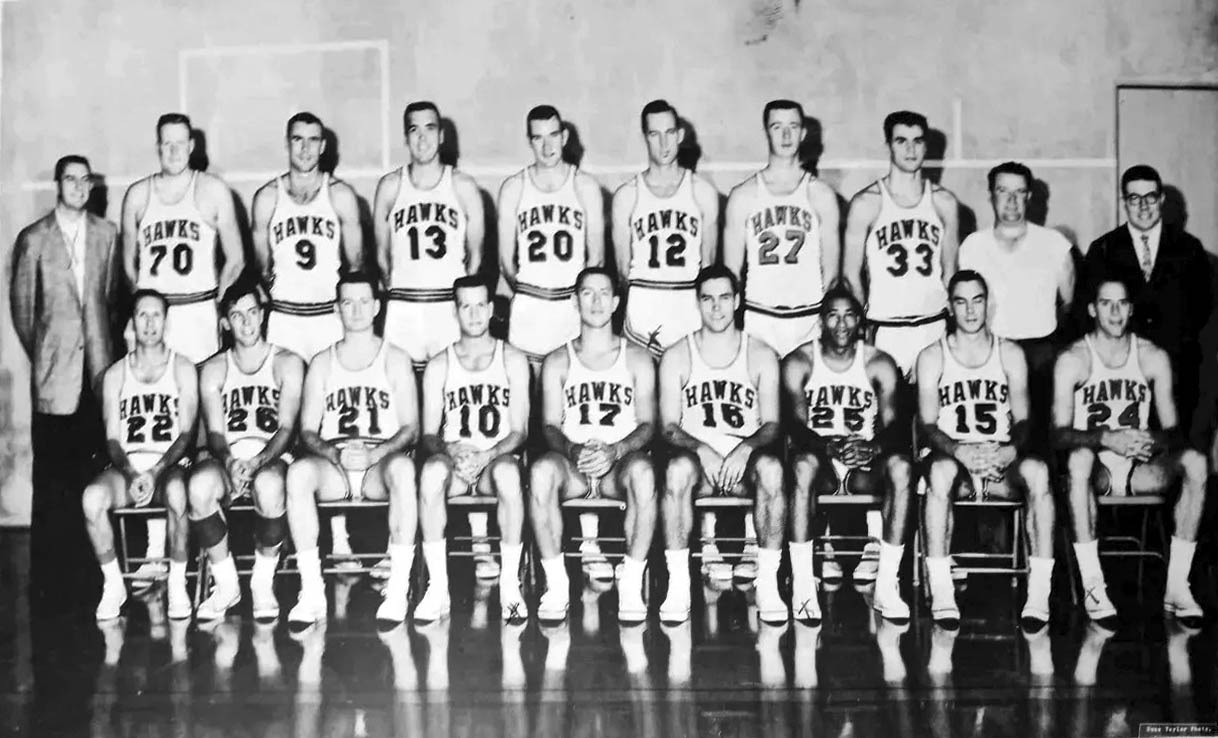
St. Louis Hawks, 1957–58 NBA champions

The 1957–58 NBA season was the 12th season of the National Basketball Association. The season ended with the St. Louis Hawks winning the NBA championship, beating the Boston Celtics 4 games to 2 in the NBA Finals.

== Notable occurrences ==
- The Pistons relocate from Fort Wayne, Indiana to Detroit, Michigan.
- The Royals relocate from Rochester, New York to Cincinnati, Ohio
- Royals player Maurice Stokes suffers major head injury during the last game of the regular season. Stokes would later become paralyzed from the injury and cared for by teammate/life long friend Jack Twyman. The Twyman–Stokes Teammate of the Year Award is given in their honor.
- The 1958 NBA All-Star Game was played in St. Louis, Missouri, with the East beating the West 130–118. Local hero Bob Pettit of the St. Louis Hawks wins the game's MVP award.

Coaching changes
Offseason
Team	1956–57 coach	1957–58 coach
Minneapolis Lakers	John Kundla	George Mikan
In-season
Team	Outgoing coach	Incoming coach
Detroit Pistons	Charles Eckman	Red Rocha

== Final standings ==
=== Eastern Division ===
Eastern Division	W	L	PCT	GB	Home	Road	Neutral	Div
x-Boston Celtics	49	23	.681	-	25-4	16-13	8-6	20-16
x-Syracuse Nationals	41	31	.569	8	26-5	8-20	7-6	21-15
x-Philadelphia Warriors	37	35	.514	12	15-11	11-19	11-5	17-19
New York Knicks	35	37	.486	14	16-12	11-18	8-7	14-22

=== Western Division ===
Western Division	W	L	PCT	GB	Home	Road	Neutral	Div
x-St. Louis Hawks	41	31	.569	-	23-8	8-19	10-4	24-12
x-Detroit Pistons	33	39	.458	8	14-14	13-17	6-8	18-18
x-Cincinnati Royals	33	39	.458	8	17-12	10-19	6-8	17-19
Minneapolis Lakers	19	53	.264	22	10-15	4-21	5-17	13-23

x – clinched playoff spot

== Playoffs ==
Division Semifinals
E3	Philadelphia	2
E2	Syracuse	1
W3	Cincinnati	0
W2	Detroit	2

Division Finals
Eastern Division
E1	Boston*	4
E3	Philadelphia	1
Western Division
W1	St. Louis*	4
W2	Detroit	1

NBA Finals
E1	Boston*	2
W1	St. Louis*	4

- * Division winner
- Bold Series winner
- Italic Team with home-court advantage in NBA Finals

== Statistics leaders ==
Category	Player	Team	Stat
Points	George Yardley	Detroit Pistons	2,001
Rebounds	Bill Russell	Boston Celtics	1,564
Assists	Bob Cousy	Boston Celtics	463
FG%	Jack Twyman	Cincinnati Royals	.452
FT%	Dolph Schayes	Syracuse Nationals	.904

Note: Prior to the 1969–70 season, league leaders in points, rebounds, and assists were determined by totals rather than averages.

== NBA awards ==
- Most Valuable Player: Bill Russell, Boston Celtics
- Rookie of the Year: Woody Sauldsberry, Philadelphia Warriors
- All-NBA First Team:
  - F – Dolph Schayes, Syracuse Nationals
  - F – George Yardley, Detroit Pistons
  - C – Bob Pettit, St. Louis Hawks
  - G – Bob Cousy, Boston Celtics
  - G – Bill Sharman, Boston Celtics
- All-NBA Second Team:
  - F – Cliff Hagan, St. Louis Hawks
  - F – Maurice Stokes, Cincinnati Royals
  - C – Bill Russell, Boston Celtics
  - G – Tom Gola, Philadelphia Warriors
  - G – Slater Martin, St. Louis Hawks

== See also ==
- List of NBA regular season records
