= List of 1958–59 NBA season transactions =

This is a list of all personnel changes for the 1958 NBA off-season and 1958-59 NBA season.

== Events ==
=== August 5, 1958 ===
- The St. Louis Hawks traded Wayne Embry, Jim Palmer, Darrell Floyd, Gerry Calvert and Ken Sidle to the Cincinnati Royals for Clyde Lovellette. Lovellette was sent as player to be named later on September 16, 1958.

=== September 12, 1958 ===
- The Philadelphia Warriors hired Al Cervi as head coach.

=== November 20, 1958 ===
- The St. Louis Hawks fired Andy Phillip as head coach.
- The St. Louis Hawks hired Ed Macauley as head coach.

=== December 1, 1958 ===
- The Cincinnati Royals fired Bobby Wanzer as head coach.
- The Cincinnati Royals hired Tom Marshall as head coach.

=== December 16, 1958 ===
- The Cincinnati Royals traded Vern Hatton to the Philadelphia Warriors for Phil Rollins.
- The Syracuse Nationals claimed George Dempsey on waivers from the Philadelphia Warriors.

=== January 14, 1959 ===
- The Cincinnati Royals traded Si Green to the St. Louis Hawks for Med Park and Jack Stephens.

=== January 27, 1959 ===
- The Philadelphia Warriors traded Jack George to the New York Knicks for Guy Sparrow.

=== February 13, 1959 ===
- The Detroit Pistons traded George Yardley to the Syracuse Nationals for Ed Conlin.

=== March 18, 1959 ===
- Al Cervi resigns as head coach for Philadelphia Warriors.

=== March 31, 1959 ===
- The Cincinnati Royals traded Archie Dees and a 1959 2nd round draft pick (Tom Robitaille was later selected) to the Detroit Pistons for Phil Jordon.

== Notes ==
- ^{a} Number of years played in the NBA prior to the draft
- ^{b} Career with the franchise that drafted the player
- ^{c} Never played a game for the franchise
