= List of 1961–62 NBA season transactions =

These are the list of personnel changes in the NBA from the 1961–62 NBA season.

== Events ==
=== August ?, 1961 ===
- The Cincinnati Royals sold Mike Farmer to the St. Louis Hawks. Farmer played in the ABL in between.

=== August 2, 1961 ===
- The Philadelphia Warriors hired Frank McGuire as head coach.

=== August 19, 1961 ===
- The Philadelphia Warriors traded Joe Graboski to the St. Louis Hawks for Frank Radovich, Bob McDonald and cash.

=== September 12, 1961 ===
- Dick Garmaker retired from the New York Knicks.

=== October 3, 1961 ===
- The Detroit Pistons signed George Patterson as a free agent.

=== October 31, 1961 ===
- The New York Knicks signed Doug Kistler as a free agent.

=== November 18, 1961 ===
- The St. Louis Hawks fired Paul Seymour as head coach.

=== November 20, 1961 ===
- The St. Louis Hawks hired Andrew Levane as head coach.

=== November 21, 1961 ===
- The St. Louis Hawks traded Joe Graboski, Si Green and Woody Sauldsberry to the Chicago Packers for Barney Cable and Archie Dees.

=== November 29, 1961 ===
- The Chicago Packers sold Vern Hatton to the Philadelphia Warriors.
- The Chicago Packers waived York Larese.

=== November 30, 1961 ===
- The Philadelphia Warriors sold Vern Hatton to the St. Louis Hawks.
- The Philadelphia Warriors signed York Larese as a free agent.

=== December ?, 1961 ===
- The Philadelphia Warriors sold Bob McNeill to the Los Angeles Lakers.
- The Los Angeles Lakers sold Bob Sims to the St. Louis Hawks.

=== December 1, 1961 ===
- The Detroit Pistons sold Shellie McMillon to the St. Louis Hawks.

=== December 10, 1961 ===
- The New York Knicks waived Doug Kistler.

=== December 11, 1961 ===
- The Boston Celtics sold Al Butler to the New York Knicks.

=== December 28, 1961 ===
- The Chicago Packers sold Joe Graboski to the Syracuse Nationals.

=== March 6, 1962 ===
- The St. Louis Hawks signed Stacey Arceneaux as a free agent.

=== March 7, 1962 ===
- The St. Louis Hawks reassigned Head Coach Andrew Levane.

=== March 9, 1962 ===
- The St. Louis Hawks appointed Bob Pettit as head coach.

=== March 13, 1962 ===
- The St. Louis Hawks hired Harry Gallatin as head coach.

=== June ?, 1962 ===
- The St. Louis Hawks sold Clyde Lovellette to the Boston Celtics.

=== June 12, 1962 ===
- The Chicago Packers fired Jim Pollard as head coach.

=== June 13, 1962 ===
- The St. Louis Hawks waived Bob Sims.
- The St. Louis Hawks waived Stacey Arceneaux.

=== June 14, 1962 ===
- The St. Louis Hawks traded Al Ferrari and Shellie McMillon to the Chicago Packers for Bill Bridges and Ralph Davis.

=== June 26, 1962 ===
- The Chicago Packers signed Ralph Wells as a free agent.

=== July 24, 1962 ===
- The Chicago Zephyrs hired Jack McMahon as head coach.
