= Jack George (basketball) =

American basketball player (1928–1989)

Personal information
- Born: November 13, 1928 Swissvale, Pennsylvania, U.S.
- Died: January 30, 1989 (aged 60)
- Listed height: 6 ft 2 in (1.88 m)
- Listed weight: 190 lb (86 kg)

Career information
- High school: St. John's College HS (Washington, D.C.)
- College: La Salle (1949–1951)
- NBA draft: 1953: 13th round, 102nd overall pick
- Drafted by: Philadelphia Warriors
- Playing career: 1953–1961
- Position: Point guard / shooting guard
- Number: 4, 17, 5

Career history
- 1953–1959: Philadelphia Warriors
- 1959–1961: New York Knicks

Career highlights
- NBA champion (1956); 2× NBA All-Star (1956, 1957); All-NBA Second Team (1956)

Career statistics
- Points: 5,153 (10.2 ppg)
- Rebounds: 2,129 (4.2 rpg)
- Assists: 2,169 (4.3 apg)
- Stats at NBA.com
- Stats at Basketball Reference

John Edwin George Jr. (November 13, 1928 – January 30, 1989) was an American professional basketball player in the National Basketball Association (NBA). He was born in the Pittsburgh suburb of Swissvale, Pennsylvania.

George attended St. John's College High School in Washington, D.C. He played basketball and baseball at La Salle University in the early 1950s. He was selected by the Philadelphia Warriors in the 1953 NBA draft and played eight seasons in the league with the Warriors and New York Knicks. Among the highlights of his NBA career were his NBA Championship with the Warriors in 1956 and his NBA All-Star Game appearances in 1956 and 1957. The 6'2" guard ranked within the NBA's top ten in assists per game six times throughout his career and led the league in total minutes played (2,840) in 1955–56.

== NBA career statistics ==
Legend
GP	Games played	GS	Games started	MPG	Minutes per game
FG%	Field goal percentage	3P%	3-point field goal percentage	FT%	Free throw percentage
RPG	Rebounds per game	APG	Assists per game	SPG	Steals per game
BPG	Blocks per game	PPG	Points per game	**Bold**	Career high
†	Won an NBA championship	*	Led the league

†	Denotes season in which George won an NBA championship
*	Led the league

=== Regular season ===
Year	Team	GP	MPG	FG%	FT%	RPG	APG	PPG
1953–54	Philadelphia	71	37.3	.352	.590	**5.4**	4.4	9.5
1954–55	Philadelphia	68	36.5	**.385**	.660	4.4	5.3	11.4
1955–56†	Philadelphia	**72**	**39.4***	.374	.757	4.3	**6.3**	**13.9**
1956–57	Philadelphia	67	33.3	.337	.683	4.7	4.6	10.5
1957–58	Philadelphia	**72**	26.5	.370	.736	4.0	3.3	8.9
1958–59	Philadelphia	46	30.2	.341	.730	4.6	3.6	9.8
1958–59	New York	25	19.8	.358	**.824**	3.3	2.2	6.6
1959–60	New York	69	23.2	**.385**	.767	2.9	3.5	9.5
1960–61	New York	16	16.8	.333	.667	2.0	2.4	5.1
Career		506	31.3	.364	.704	4.2	4.3	10.2
All-Star		2	21.0	.385	1.000	2.0	3.5	7.0

=== Playoffs ===
Year	Team	GP	MPG	FG%	FT%	RPG	APG	PPG
1955–56†	Philadelphia	**10**	**40.5**	.390	.746	4.7	**5.2**	**13.6**
1956–57	Philadelphia	2	31.5	**.467**	.667	3.5	3.0	9.0
1957–58	Philadelphia	8	34.6	.370	**.800**	**4.8**	3.9	9.5
1958–59	New York	2	15.5	.333	–	2.0	1.5	4.0
Career		22	35.3	.385	.753	4.4	4.2	10.8

== See also ==
- List of National Basketball Association annual minutes leaders
