= Bennie Swain =

American basketball player

Personal information
- Born: December 16, 1933 Talladega, Alabama, U.S.
- Died: June 19, 2008 (aged 74) Houston, Texas, U.S.
- Listed height: 6 ft 8 in (2.03 m)
- Listed weight: 220 lb (100 kg)

Career information
- High school: Westside (Talladega, Alabama)
- College: Texas Southern (1954–1958)
- NBA draft: 1958: 1st round, 7th overall pick
- Drafted by: Boston Celtics
- Playing career: 1958–1959
- Position: Power forward
- Number: 16

Career history
- 1958–1959: Boston Celtics

Career highlights
- NBA champion (1959); Second-team All-American – NEA (1957); 4× All-SWAC (1955–1958)

Career statistics
- Points: 265 (4.6 ppg)
- Rebounds: 262 (4.5 rpg)
- Assists: 29 (0.5 apg)
- Stats at NBA.com
- Stats at Basketball Reference

Bennie Samuel Swain (December 16, 1933 – June 19, 2008) was an American professional basketball player.

A 6'8" power forward, Swain played at Texas Southern University in the 1950s. He led the NAIA in scoring during the 1957–58 season and was named an NAIA All-American. After graduating, Swain was selected by the Boston Celtics with the seventh pick of the 1958 NBA draft. He played one season for the Celtics, contributing 4.6 points and 4.5 rebounds per game en route to the 1959 NBA Championship.

He was the first Texas Southern University player to earn an NBA Championship ring.

Swain later served as a high school basketball coach.

== Career statistics ==
Legend
GP	Games played	GS	Games started	MPG	Minutes per game
FG%	Field goal percentage	3P%	3-point field goal percentage	FT%	Free throw percentage
RPG	Rebounds per game	APG	Assists per game	SPG	Steals per game
BPG	Blocks per game	PPG	Points per game	**Bold**	Career high
†	Won an NBA championship

=== NBA ===
==== Regular season ====
Year	Team	GP	MPG	FG%	FT%	RPG	APG	PPG
1958–59†	Boston	58	12.2	.406	.609	4.5	.5	4.6

==== Playoffs ====
Year	Team	GP	MPG	FG%	FT%	RPG	APG	PPG
1959†	Boston	5	5.4	.333	.500	2.8	.2	1.0
