= Mike Farmer (basketball) =

American basketball player and coach (born 1936)

Personal information
- Born: September 26, 1936 Oklahoma City, Oklahoma, U.S.
- Died: January 1, 2025 (aged 88)
- Listed height: 6 ft 7 in (2.01 m)
- Listed weight: 210 lb (95 kg)

Career information
- High school: Richmond (Richmond, California)
- College: San Francisco (1955–1958)
- NBA draft: 1958: 1st round, 3rd overall pick
- Drafted by: New York Knicks
- Playing career: 1958–1966
- Position: Small forward
- Number: 8, 51, 12
- Coaching career: 1965–1966

Career history

Playing
- 1958–1960: New York Knicks
- 1960–1961: Cincinnati Royals
- 1961–1962: San Francisco Saints
- 1962–1966: St. Louis Hawks

Coaching
- 1965–1966: St. Louis Hawks (assistant)
- 1966: Baltimore Bullets

Career highlights
- NCAA champion (1956); Consensus second-team All-American (1958); 2× WCC Player of the Year (1957, 1958); 2× First-team All-WCC (1957, 1958); No. 17 retired by San Francisco Dons

Career NBA playing statistics
- Points: 2,816 (6.7 ppg)
- Rebounds: 1,950 (4.6 rpg)
- Assists: 550 (1.3 apg)
- Stats at NBA.com
- Stats at Basketball Reference

Career coaching record
- NBA: 1–8 (.111)
- Record at Basketball Reference

Don Michael Farmer (September 26, 1936 – January 1, 2025) was an American professional basketball player and coach. A 6 ft 7 in (2.01 m) forward, he was selected with the third pick in the 1958 NBA draft by the New York Knicks after a college career at the University of San Francisco (USF). He also played one year in the American Basketball League. He was known throughout his basketball career for his defensive skill.

Farmer was a member of the 1955–56 USF Dons team that had a 29–0 record and won the 1956 NCAA men's basketball tournament; and which has been considered one of the greatest college basketball teams in NCAA history. He was a consensus second-team All-American in 1958, and was twice named the West Coast Athletic Conference's Player of the Year (1957 and 1958).

== Early life ==
Farmer was born on September 26, 1936, in Oklahoma City, Oklahoma. He attended Richmond High School in Richmond, California, where he played on the basketball team. He was reported to be 6 ft 7 in (2.01 m) as a 16-year old junior center in 1953. He was noted for his ball handling and rebounding skills. As a senior in 1954, Farmer was selected second-team All-Alameda County Athletic League (ACAL). He was also selected among the Top 10 players in the Acker Round Robin Basketball Tournament that same year.

== College career ==
Farmer attended the University of San Francisco (USF), where he played basketball for the Dons. He was recruited to USF by Hal DeJulio. He led the freshman team in scoring (1954–55). As a sophomore (1955–56) Farmer's teammates included future Naismith Basketball Hall of Fame center Bill Russell (also recruited by DeJulio) and Hall of Fame guard K. C. Jones; playing under future Hall of Fame head coach Phil Woolpert. He was a starting forward on the 1955–56 Dons team that had a 29–0 record and won the NCAA men's basketball tournament. The 1955–56 Dons team was the first undefeated team in college basketball history, and has been considered among the greatest college basketball teams of all time.

In the Dons' 1956 tournament semifinal (final four) win over Southern Methodist, Farmer had 26 points and 10 rebounds. In the championship game victory over the Iowa Hawkeyes, 83–71, Farmer started and missed all ten of his field goal attempts, but pulled down 12 rebounds. In the first round of the West Regional tournament, he had 15 points and 15 rebounds in the Dons win over UCLA. On the season, Farmer played in 28 games, averaging 8.4 points and 7.8 rebounds per game.

As a junior (1956–57), Farmer averaged 12 points and 9.5 rebounds per game on a 21–7 Dons team. He was named to the first-team All-West Regional team in the 1957 NCAA men's basketball tournament. San Francisco was the West Regional champion and went on to the national finals. The Dons reached the final four teams in the 1957 national tournament, but lost to the Kansas Jayhawks, 80–56. Farmer was assigned to guard future Hall of Fame center Wilt Chamberlain during the first half of that game. The Dons defeated Michigan State in the game for third place, with Farmer scoring 16 points in that game. Farmer was named the West Coast Athletic Conference's (WCAC) Player of the Year for the 1956–57 season. United Press named him first-team All-Coast that season.

As a senior (1957–58), Farmer averaged 11.3 points and 8.2 rebounds per game. The Dons had a 25–2 record and finished the season ranked No. 4 by the Associated Press. Farmer was a consensus second-team All-American. He was considered to be a top player nationally on defense. Throughout his basketball career, Farmer focused as much on defense as offense, and when he was having a poor night offensively he would put in extra effort on defense. In the 1956–57 and 1957–58 seasons, Woolpert regularly gave Farmer the toughest defensive assignments in each game, and Farmer was considered the team's "defensive stopper".

The Dons lost in the first round of the 1958 West Regional tournament to the University of Seattle, 69–67, led by future NBA Hall of Fame forward Elgin Baylor's 35 points; with Baylor's last second shot winning the game for Seattle. Farmer had 10 points and seven rebounds. Farmer and Leroy Wright of the University of the Pacific were both selected to receive the 1957–58 season WCAC Player of the Year Award. Farmer was also named first-team All-WCAC that season.

== Professional career ==
The New York Knicks selected Farmer in the first round of the 1958 NBA draft, third overall (Baylor being the draft's first pick). Farmer played in the National Basketball Association (NBA) for a total of seven seasons with New York, the Cincinnati Royals, and the St. Louis Hawks. He averaged 6.7 points and 4.6 rebounds per game during his little over six years in the NBA, and was known for playing good defense.

=== New York Knicks and Cincinnati Royals ===
As a rookie with the Knicks (1958–59), Farmer was a reserve small forward playing behind Willie Naulls. Farmer averaged 21.5 minutes, six points, and 4.4 rebounds per game on the season. He continued as a reserve behind Naulls in the 1959–60 season, averaging 22.9 minutes, 7.4 points, and 5.7 rebounds per game. He missed seven games during the early part of that season with a hip injury. He had played in only two games for the Knicks at the beginning of the 1960–61 season, when his contract was sold to the Cincinnati Royals in mid-November 1960.

Farmer played 57 games in his sole season with Cincinnati, as a reserve small forward behind Jack Twyman. Farmer averaged 22.5 minutes, 7.5 points, 6.6 rebounds, and 1.4 assists per game for the Royals that season. Over the season's final 17 games, Farmer averaged nearly 13 points per game. During an altercation in a February 1961 game with the Los Angeles Lakers, Farmer was knocked unconscious by a single punch thrown by 6 ft 11 in (2.11) Ray Felix and was unable to finish the game. Felix was ejected and later fined by NBA commissioner Maurice Podoloff.

=== San Francisco Saints ===
In May 1961, Farmer expressed his intention to join the San Francisco Saints in the newly created American Basketball League (ABL), and the Royals threatened a lawsuit to prevent Farmer from joining the new league. However, Farmer had personal reasons for wanting to play in San Francisco, including being closer to his home in Richmond, and he later said the Royals ultimately respected his wishes and their parting was without hard feelings. Farmer played for the Saints during the 1961–62 season, under his former college head coach, Phil Woolpert. He average 14.6 points per game during the season. In late December 1961, Farmer was hospitalized with a back injury after suffering collisions with the Los Angeles Jets' 7 ft 2 in (2.18 m) Bill Spivey over two successive games in three days, having to be placed in traction. The ABL finanancially folded by the end of 1962.

=== St. Louis Hawks ===
The Saints failed to make a timely contract offer to Farmer in August 1962, and he became a free agent. Within days he signed with the St. Louis Hawks of the NBA. The Hawks had paid the Royals for the NBA rights to Farmer a year earlier. Farmer played in a career-high 80 games for the Hawks in the 1962–63 season. He averaged, 21.6 minutes, 7.4 points, 4.6 rebounds, and 1.8 assists per game, sharing time with Cliff Hagan at small forward (who averaged 21.7 minutes per game). Farmer's defensive play helped improve the team's record from its 29–51 record the previous season, to a 48–32 second place finish and a place in the playoffs. At the beginning of the season, Hawks' coach Harry Gallatin described Farmer as a "defensive specialist", who he intended to use against players like Elgin Baylor in an effort to alter their play on offense.

In 11 playoffs games that season he averaged nearly 24 minutes per game, and 6.1 points, 4.7 rebounds, and 2.5 assists per game. The Hawks lost four games to three to the Lakers in the NBA Western Division finals, with Farmer averaging 21.3 minutes per game in that series, where he had the defensive task of guarding Elgin Baylor (whom Farmer had faced in the 1958 NCAA tournament). Farmer's second quarter defense played a decisive factor in the Hawks' Game 6 win in that series, but he was also injured in the game.

In 1963–64, he was again a reserve small forward, averaging 17.9 minutes per game behind Cliff Hagan. During the 1964–65 season with the Hawks, Farmer missed at least 20 games with injuries. He played in 60 games that season, averaging 21.2 minutes, 6.8 points, and 4.3 rebounds per game. In November 1965, after playing in only nine games for the Hawks and averaging less than 10 minutes per game, Farmer announced his retirement from the NBA. The Hawks made him an assistant coach to head coach Richie Guerin, Farmer's former teammate with the Knicks.

In a little over six seasons in the NBA, Farmer played in 423 games, averaging nearly 21 minutes, 6.7 points, 4.6 rebounds, and 1.3 assists per game.

== Coaching career ==
During the 1965–66 season, Farmer served as an assistant coach and chief scout for the St. Louis Hawks. On April 28, 1966, Farmer was announced as head coach of the Baltimore Bullets. He was still permitted to advise the Hawks on the college draft, even after his April 1966 signing with the Bullets. His appointment was considered as a surprise. At the age of 30, Farmer was the youngest coach in the NBA during the 1966–67 season. On November 5, 1966, Farmer was fired by the Bullets after he led the team to a 1–8 record and was replaced by general manager Buddy Jeannette.He was later a volunteer assistant basketball coach at the University of San Francisco in the 1980s, after returning to complete his education.

== Legacy and honors ==
In 1971, Farmer was inducted into the University of San Francisco's Athletics Hall of Fame. In May 2000, USF retired his jersey No. 17.

== Personal life and death ==
After retiring from basketball, Farmer owned a tire company and was a restauranteur. He also worked as a sales executive and construction company supervisor. While a student at USF in the 1950s, in addition to playing basketball, he was married, had two jobs, and commuted to school from Richmond each day; never earning his degree before going into professional basketball. He was bothered for many years that he had never obtained an academic degree, and even believed it limited his ability to obtain a coaching position.

In 1985, at age 48, Farmer returned to USF as a student through the National Consortium for Academics and Sports program, even living in a freshman dorm. He was divorced at the time, and his children were all adults. He earned a bachelor's degree in business in 1987, calling it "probably the most beautiful experience of my life". He was an assistant coach with the Dons basketball team and/or golf team, and was the school's coordinator of degree completion. After receiving his degree, Farmer earned a position at USF teaching in the school's exercise and sport science program until his retirement, teaching into his seventies.

Farmer died in Santa Rosa, California on January 1, 2025, survived by four children, nine grandchildren and six great grandchildren.

== Career playing statistics ==
Legend
GP	Games played	GS	Games started	MPG	Minutes per game
FG%	Field goal percentage	3P%	3-point field goal percentage	FT%	Free throw percentage
RPG	Rebounds per game	APG	Assists per game	SPG	Steals per game
BPG	Blocks per game	PPG	Points per game	**Bold**	Career high
*	Led the league

=== NBA ===
==== Regular season ====
Year	Team	GP	MPG	FG%	FT%	RPG	APG	PPG
1958–59	New York	72*	21.5	.353	.838	4.4	.9	6.0
1959–60	New York	67	**22.9**	.373	**.843**	5.7	.9	7.4
1960–61	New York	2	3.0	.000	–	1.0	.0	.0
1960–61	Cincinnati	57	22.7	.391	.734	**6.6**	1.4	**7.5**
1962–63	St. Louis	**80***	21.6	.425	.842	4.6	**1.8**	7.4
1963–64	St. Louis	76	17.9	.406	.819	3.0	1.4	5.6
1964–65	St. Louis	60	21.2	.409	.798	4.3	1.5	6.8
1965–66	St. Louis	9	8.8	**.433**	.800	2.0	.7	3.3
Career		423	20.8	.393	.814	4.6	1.3	6.7

==== Playoffs ====
Year	Team	GP	MPG	FG%	FT%	RPG	APG	PPG
1959	New York	2	17.0	.294	.400	**5.0**	.0	6.0
1963	St. Louis	**11**	**23.8**	.365	.765	4.7	**2.5**	**6.1**
1964	St. Louis	**11**	10.8	**.559**	**.800**	1.5	.8	4.2
1965	St. Louis	1	7.0	.500	–	1.0	.0	4.0
Career		25	16.9	.411	.719	3.2	1.4	5.2

== Head coaching record ==
Legend
Regular season	G	Games coached	W	Games won	L	Games lost	W–L %	Win–loss %
Playoffs	PG	Playoff games	PW	Playoff wins	PL	Playoff losses	PW–L %	Playoff win–loss %

=== NBA ===
Team	Year	G	W	L	W–L%	Finish	PG	PW	PL	PW–L%	Result
Baltimore	1966–67	9	1	8	.111	(fired)	—	—	—	—	
