= George Dempsey (basketball) =

American basketball player (1927–2017)

Personal information
- Born: July 19, 1929 Philadelphia, Pennsylvania
- Died: October 7, 2017 (aged 88)
- Listed height: 6 ft 2 in (1.88 m)
- Listed weight: 190 lb (86 kg)

Career information
- High school: Merchantville (Merchantville, New Jersey)
- College: The King's College (New York)
- NBA draft: 1951: 7th round, 68th overall pick
- Drafted by: Philadelphia Warriors
- Playing career: 1954–1959
- Position: Point guard
- Number: 19, 5, 3

Career history
- 1954–1959: Philadelphia Warriors
- 1959: Syracuse Nationals

Career highlights
- NBA champion (1956)

Career statistics
- Points: 1,574 (5.0 ppg)
- Rebounds: 1,125 (3.6 rpg)
- Assists: 711 (2.3 apg)
- Stats at NBA.com
- Stats at Basketball Reference

George P. Dempsey (July 19, 1929 – October 7, 2017) was an American professional basketball player.

Born in Philadelphia, Dempsey moved to Merchantville, New Jersey, and played for the 1947 Merchantville High School team that won the New Jersey Group II state championship.

Dempsey played as a guard for The King's College for five seasons from 1954 to 1959. He then played in the National Basketball Association as a member of the Philadelphia Warriors and Syracuse Nationals. He averaged 5.0 points per game in his career and won a league championship with Philadelphia in 1956.

Dempsey was a resident of Pennsauken Township, New Jersey, until his death in 2017.

== Career statistics ==
Legend
| GP | Games played | GS | Games started | MPG | Minutes per game |
| FG% | Field goal percentage | 3P% | 3-point field goal percentage | FT% | Free throw percentage |
| RPG | Rebounds per game | APG | Assists per game | SPG | Steals per game |
| BPG | Blocks per game | PPG | Points per game | **Bold** | Career high |
| † | Won an NBA championship | * | Led the league |

=== NBA ===
==== Regular season ====
| Year | Team | GP | MPG | FG% | FT% | RPG | APG | PPG |
|---|---|---|---|---|---|---|---|---|
| 1954–55 | Philadelphia | 48 | **28.9** | .353 | .695 | **4.9** | **3.6** | **7.5** |
| 1955–56† | Philadelphia | **72** | 20.1 | .475 | .633 | 3.7 | 2.8 | 4.7 |
| 1956–57 | Philadelphia | 71 | 16.2 | .444 | .539 | 3.5 | 1.9 | 4.5 |
| 1957–58 | Philadelphia | 67 | 15.6 | .360 | .667 | 3.2 | 1.9 | 4.4 |
| 1958–59 | Philadelphia | 23 | 12.3 | **.480** | .697 | 2.6 | 1.4 | 4.1 |
| 1958–59 | Syracuse | 34 | 12.1 | .400 | **.795** | 2.9 | 1.1 | 5.0 |
| Career | | 315 | 18.2 | .407 | .661 | 3.6 | 2.3 | 5.0 |

==== Playoffs ====
| Year | Team | GP | MPG | FG% | FT% | RPG | APG | PPG |
|---|---|---|---|---|---|---|---|---|
| 1956† | Philadelphia | **10*** | 13.4 | .400 | .700 | 2.5 | 1.3 | 3.8 |
| 1957 | Philadelphia | 2 | **37.0** | .429 | .438 | **7.5** | **6.0** | **12.5** |
| 1958 | Philadelphia | 8 | 12.6 | **.500** | .556 | 2.3 | .8 | 4.1 |
| 1959 | Syracuse | 5 | 6.0 | .375 | **.750** | 1.2 | .8 | 1.8 |
| Career | | 25 | 13.6 | .437 | .592 | 2.6 | 1.4 | 4.2 |
