= Ernie Beck =

American basketball player (1931–2024)

Personal information
- Born: December 11, 1931 Philadelphia, Pennsylvania, U.S.
- Died: December 12, 2024 (aged 93) West Chester, Pennsylvania, U.S.
- Listed height: 6 ft 4 in (1.93 m)
- Listed weight: 190 lb (86 kg)

Career information
- High school: West Philadelphia Catholic (Philadelphia, Pennsylvania)
- College: Penn (1950–1953)
- NBA draft: 1953: territorial pick
- Drafted by: Philadelphia Warriors
- Playing career: 1953–1964
- Position: Small forward / shooting guard
- Number: 7, 12, 3

Career history

Playing
- 1953–1954: Philadelphia Warriors
- 1954: Lancaster Red Roses
- 1955–1960: Philadelphia Warriors
- 1961: St. Louis Hawks
- 1961: Syracuse Nationals
- 1961–1964: Sunbury Mercuries

Coaching
- 1963–1964: Sunbury Mercuries

Career highlights
- NBA champion (1956); All-EPBL Second Team (1963); Consensus first-team All-American (1953); NCAA rebounding leader (1951)

Career NBA statistics
- Points: 2,325 (6.3 ppg)
- Rebounds: 1,191 (3.2 rpg)
- Assists: 669 (1.8 apg)
- Stats at NBA.com
- Stats at Basketball Reference

Ernest Joseph Beck (December 11, 1931 – December 12, 2024) was an American professional basketball player. Born in Philadelphia, Beck played seven years in the National Basketball Association for the Philadelphia Warriors, St. Louis Hawks, and Syracuse Nationals. He was a territorial pick in the 1953 NBA draft, selected by the Warriors. Beck attended the University of Pennsylvania.

Beck played one game for the Lancaster Red Roses of the Eastern Professional Basketball League (EPBL) in 1954. He played for the Sunbury Mercuries of the EPBL from 1960 to 1964. Beck was selected to the All-EPBL Second Team in 1963. He served as head coach of the Mercuries during the 1963–64 season and accumulated a 2–6 record.

He died in West Chester, Pennsylvania on December 12, 2024, one day after his 93rd birthday.

== NBA career statistics ==
Legend
GP	Games played	GS	Games started	MPG	Minutes per game
FG%	Field goal percentage	3P%	3-point field goal percentage	FT%	Free throw percentage
RPG	Rebounds per game	APG	Assists per game	SPG	Steals per game
BPG	Blocks per game	PPG	Points per game	**Bold**	Career high
†	Won an NBA championship	*	Led the league

=== Regular season ===
Year	Team	GP	GS	MPG	FG%	3P%	FT%	RPG	APG	SPG	BPG	PPG
1953–54	Philadelphia	15	-	**28.1**	.275	-	.791	3.3	2.3	-	-	7.5
1955–56†	Philadelphia	67	-	15.0	.387	-	.717	2.9	1.2	-	-	5.2
1956–57	Philadelphia	**72***	-	24.2	.384	-	.707	**4.3**	2.6	-	-	7.0
1957–58	Philadelphia	71	-	27.8	**.398**	-	.837	**4.3**	**2.7**	-	-	**10.1**
1958–59	Philadelphia	70	-	14.5	.390	-	.662	2.5	1.3	-	-	5.3
1959–60	Philadelphia	66	-	12.3	.388	-	.844	1.9	1.1	-	-	3.9
1960–61	St. Louis	7	-	8.9	.333	-	**1.000**	1.7	1.9	-	-	2.7
1960–61	Syracuse	3	-	6.7	.375	-	.500	3.7	0.7	-	-	2.3
Career		371	-	19.0	.383	-	.762	3.2	1.8	-	-	6.3

=== Playoffs ===
Year	Team	GP	GS	MPG	FG%	3P%	FT%	RPG	APG	SPG	BPG	PPG
1955–56†	Philadelphia	**10***	-	25.0	.431	-	.710	**5.1**	2.2	-	-	8.4
1956–57	Philadelphia	2	-	**44.5**	.368	-	**1.000**	5.0	**2.5**	-	-	**15.5**
1957–58	Philadelphia	8	-	19.5	.377	-	.667	4.0	1.6	-	-	6.5
1959–60	Philadelphia	4	-	5.5	**.444**	-	.000	1.5	0.8	-	-	2.0
Career		24	-	21.5	.400	-	.705	4.1	1.8	-	-	7.3

== See also ==
- List of NCAA Division I men's basketball season rebounding leaders
- List of NCAA Division I men's basketball career rebounding leaders
