= Paul Arizin =

American basketball player (1928–2006)

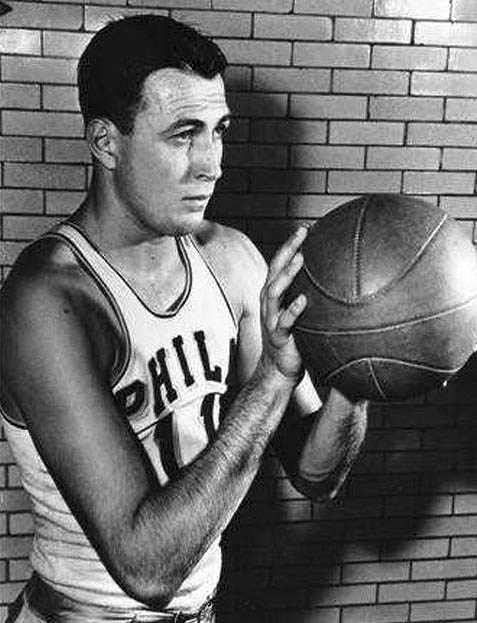
- Arizin with the Philadelphia Warriors

Personal information
- Born: April 9, 1928 Philadelphia, Pennsylvania, U.S.
- Died: December 12, 2006 (aged 78) Springfield Township, Pennsylvania, U.S.
- Listed height: 6 ft 4 in (1.93 m)
- Listed weight: 190 lb (86 kg)

Career information
- High school: La Salle (Wyndmoor, Pennsylvania)
- College: Villanova (1947–1950)
- NBA draft: 1950: territorial pick
- Drafted by: Philadelphia Warriors
- Playing career: 1950–1965
- Position: Small forward
- Number: 11

Career history
- 1950–1952: Philadelphia Warriors
- 1954: Berwick Carbuilders
- 1954–1962: Philadelphia Warriors
- 1962–1965: Camden Bullets

Career highlights
- NBA champion (1956); 10× NBA All-Star (1951, 1952, 1955–1962); NBA All-Star Game MVP (1952); 3× All-NBA First Team (1952, 1956, 1957); All-NBA Second Team (1959); 2× NBA scoring champion (1952, 1957); NBA anniversary team (25th, 50th, 75th); EPBL champion (1964); EPBL Most Valuable Player (1963); 2× All-EPBL First Team (1963, 1964); All-EPBL Second Team (1965); Helms Foundation Player of the Year (1950); Sporting News Player of the Year (1950); Consensus first-team All-American (1950); NCAA scoring champion (1950); No. 11 retired by Villanova Wildcats

Career statistics
- Points: 16,266 (22.8 ppg)
- Rebounds: 6,129 (8.6 rpg)
- Assists: 1,665 (2.3 apg)
- Stats at NBA.com
- Stats at Basketball Reference
- Basketball Hall of Fame
- Collegiate Basketball Hall of Fame

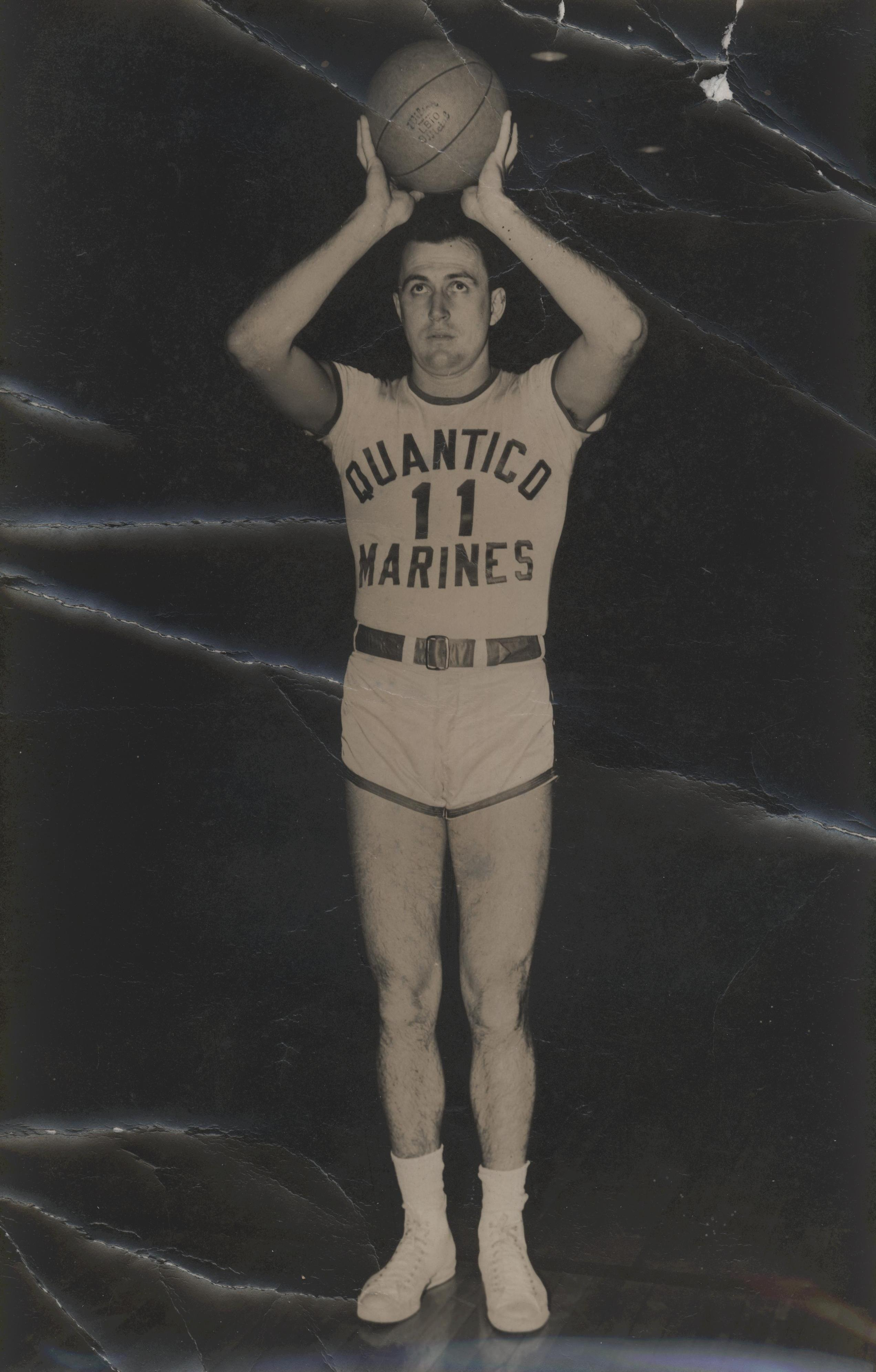
Paul J. Arizin in his Quantico Marine basketball uniform

Paul Joseph Arizin (April 9, 1928 – December 12, 2006), nicknamed "Pitchin Paul", was an American basketball player who spent his entire National Basketball Association (NBA) career with the Philadelphia Warriors from 1950 to 1962. He retired with the then third highest career point total (16,266) in NBA history, and was named to the NBA's 25th, 50th and 75th anniversary teams. He was a high-scoring forward at Villanova University before being drafted by the Warriors of the fledgling NBA.

== Early life ==
Paul Joseph Arizin was born on April 9, 1928, in Philadelphia, Pennsylvania, to French immigrants. Arizin did not play basketball at La Salle College High School, failing to make the team in his only tryout as a senior. Arizin graduated just a year before another Basketball Hall of Famer, Tom Gola, entered La Salle College High School as a freshman.

== College career ==
During his freshman year at Villanova, Arizin played CYO (Catholic Youth Organization) basketball in Philadelphia. Late in that season, Al Severance, then the Villanova varsity basketball coach, attended one of Arizin's CYO games. Afterwards, Severance approached Arizin and asked him if he would like to go to Villanova, to which Arizin answered: "I already go to Villanova."

Arizin made the team in 1947, his sophomore year, and played for three years. In 1950 he was named the collegiate basketball player of the year after leading the nation with 25.3 points per game. During a game on February 12, 1949, Arizin scored 85 points against the Naval Air Materials Center roster. Arizin also scored at least 100 points in a game while playing for Villanova, but the game is not recognized by the NCAA because the opponent was a junior college.

== Professional career ==
=== Philadelphia Warriors (1950–1962) ===
After being selected by the Warriors with their first pick in the 1950 NBA draft, Arizin averaged 17.2 points per game in his rookie season and was named NBA Rookie of the Year — a designation not currently sanctioned by the NBA for the 1950–51 season. He became one of the greatest NBA players of the 1950s, leading the league in scoring during the 1951–52 and 1956–57 seasons and leading in field goal percentage in 1951–52. Arizin sat out the 1952–53 and 1953–54 NBA seasons while serving in the Marines during the Korean War. On March 20, 1954, he appeared in a game for the Berwick Carbuilders of the Eastern Professional Basketball League (EPBL) and scored 32 points.

Arizin became famous for his line-drive jump shots, and teamed with center Neil Johnston to form the best offensive one-two punch in the NBA at the time, leading the Warriors to the 1956 NBA title. He also played with scoring star Joe Fulks early in his career, and with Philadelphia legends Tom Gola and Wilt Chamberlain toward the end of his career in the early 1960s. Arizin chose to retire from the NBA rather than move with the Warriors to San Francisco. At the time of his retirement, no player had retired from the game with a higher scoring average (21.9 points per game) in his final season. This record would stand until Bob Pettit's retirement in 1965 following a season in which he averaged 22.5 PPG.

Arizin played in a total of 10 NBA All-Star Games (he was the 1952 NBA All-Star Game MVP) and was named to the All-NBA First-Team in 1952, 1956, and 1957.

=== Camden Bullets (1962–1965) ===
After retiring from the NBA, Arizin played for three seasons with the Camden Bullets of the Eastern Professional Basketball League (EPBL), who won the 1964 title. Averaging over 20 points per game each season, he was named the EPBL MVP in 1963, was named to the EPBL All-Star First Team in 1963 and 1964 and to the EPBL All-Star Second Team in 1965.

=== Legacy ===
Arizin was named to the NBA 25th Anniversary Team in 1971. He was inducted into the Naismith Memorial Basketball Hall of Fame in 1978, and was selected to the 50 Greatest Players in NBA History in 1996. In October 2021, Arizin was honored as one of the league's greatest players of all time by being named to the NBA's 75th Anniversary Team. He was inducted into the inaugural class of the Philadelphia Sports Hall of Fame in 2004. Arizin died in his sleep at age 78 on December 12, 2006, in Springfield, Pennsylvania.

== NBA career statistics ==
Legend
GP	Games played	GS	Games started	MPG	Minutes per game
FG%	Field goal percentage	3P%	3-point field goal percentage	FT%	Free throw percentage
RPG	Rebounds per game	APG	Assists per game	SPG	Steals per game
BPG	Blocks per game	PPG	Points per game	**Bold**	Career high
†	Won an NBA championship	*	Led the league

=== Regular season ===
Year	Team	GP	MPG	FG%	FT%	RPG	APG	PPG
1950–51	Philadelphia	65	—	.407	.793	9.8	2.1	17.2
1951–52	Philadelphia	66	**44.5***	**.448***	.818	**11.3**	2.6	25.4*
1954–55	Philadelphia	72	41.0*	.399	.776	9.4	**2.9**	21.0
1955–56†	Philadelphia	72	37.8	**.448**	.810	7.5	2.6	24.2
1956–57	Philadelphia	71	39.0	.422	.829	7.9	2.1	25.6*
1957–58	Philadelphia	68	35.0	.393	.809	7.4	2.0	20.7
1958–59	Philadelphia	70	40.0	.431	.813	9.1	1.7	**26.4**
1959–60	Philadelphia	72	36.4	.424	.798	8.6	2.3	22.3
1960–61	Philadelphia	**79**	37.2	.425	**.833**	8.6	2.4	23.2
1961–62	Philadelphia	78	35.7	.410	.805	6.8	2.6	21.9
Career		713	38.4	.421	.810	8.6	2.3	22.8
All-Star		9	22.9	.466	.806	5.2	0.7	15.2

=== Playoffs ===
Year	Team	GP	MPG	FG%	FT%	RPG	APG	PPG
1951	Philadelphia	2	—	**.519**	.813	10.0	1.5	20.5
1952	Philadelphia	3	40.0	.453	**.879**	**12.7**	2.7	25.7
1956†	Philadelphia	10	40.9	.450	.838	8.4	2.9	**28.9***
1957	Philadelphia	2	11.0	.375	.600	4.0	0.5	4.5
1958	Philadelphia	8	38.6	.391	.778	7.8	2.0	23.5
1960	Philadelphia	9	41.2	.431	.873	9.6	3.7	26.3
1961	Philadelphia	3	**41.7**	.328	.697	8.7	**4.0**	22.3
1962	Philadelphia	**12**	38.3	.375	.863	6.7	2.2	23.2
Career		49	38.6	.411	.829	8.2	2.6	24.2

== See also ==
- List of individual National Basketball Association scoring leaders by season
- List of National Basketball Association career free throw scoring leaders
- List of basketball players who have scored 100 points in a single game
- List of NCAA Division I men's basketball players with 60 or more points in a game
- List of NCAA Division I men's basketball season scoring leaders
- List of National Basketball Association annual minutes leaders
- Naismith Memorial Basketball Hall of Fame
- List of NBA players who have spent their entire career with one franchise
