= 1954–55 Philadelphia Warriors season =

NBA professional basketball team season

- Head coach: Edward Gottlieb
- Arena: Philadelphia Civic Center

Results
- Record: 33–39 (.458)
- Place: Division: 4th (Eastern)
- Playoff finish: Did not qualify
- Stats at Basketball Reference

Local media
- Television: WFIL-TV
- Radio: WCAU

The 1954–55 Philadelphia Warriors season was the Warriors' 9th season in the NBA. During a very early portion of the season, the Warriors played a game against the Baltimore Bullets on Halloween in 1954, winning that game 102–97 before the original Bullets team later folded operations early in the season on November 27, 1954; that game they played would ultimately end up being wiped out from the official record books for the NBA's history. If the game they played was officially kept as a part of the season's record for the Warriors, their official record would have had Philadelphia get a losing record of 34–39 instead of 33–39 for their season.

== Roster ==
Philadelphia Warriors roster
Players

Pos.	No.	Player	Height	Weight	DOB	From
F	11	Paul Arizin	6 ft 4 in (1.93 m)	190 lb (86 kg)		Villanova
G	5	Larry Costello	6 ft 1 in (1.85 m)	186 lb (84 kg)		Niagara
F/C	12	Walt Davis	6 ft 8 in (2.03 m)	205 lb (93 kg)		Texas A&M
G	19	George Dempsey	6 ft 2 in (1.88 m)	190 lb (86 kg)		King's (NY)
G	7	Danny Finn	6 ft 1 in (1.85 m)	185 lb (84 kg)		St. John's
G	17	Jack George	6 ft 2 in (1.88 m)	190 lb (86 kg)		La Salle
F/C	9	Joe Graboski	6 ft 7 in (2.01 m)	195 lb (88 kg)		Tuley HS (IL)
G	14	Paul Hoffman	6 ft 2 in (1.88 m)	195 lb (88 kg)		Purdue
C	6	Neil Johnston	6 ft 8 in (2.03 m)	210 lb (95 kg)		Ohio State
G	7	Mike Kearns	6 ft 2 in (1.88 m)	178 lb (81 kg)		Princeton
F	14	Jackie Moore	6 ft 5 in (1.96 m)	180 lb (82 kg)		La Salle
G	4	Murray, Ken	6 ft 2 in (1.88 m)	190 lb (86 kg)		St. Bonaventure
F	15	Zeke Zawoluk	6 ft 7 in (2.01 m)	215 lb (98 kg)		St. John's

Coaches
Head coach
- Edward Gottlieb

Legend
- (DP) Unsigned draft pick
- (FA) Free agent
- (S) Suspended
- Injured

== Regular season ==
=== Season standings ===
Eastern Division	W	L	PCT	GB	Home	Road	Neutral	Div
x-Syracuse Nationals	43	29	.597	–	25–7	10–17	8–5	21–15
x-New York Knicks	38	34	.528	5	17–9	8–17	13–8	15–21
x-Boston Celtics	36	36	.500	7	21–5	4–22	11–9	19–17
Philadelphia Warriors	33	39	.458	10	14–5	6–20	13–14	17–19

x – clinched playoff spot

=== Game log ===
1954–55 Game log
#	Date	Opponent	Score	High points	Record
—	October 31	vs. Baltimore	102–97	—	0–0
1	November 13	New York	86–87	Arizin, Graboski, Johnston (22)	1–0
2	November 16	vs. Syracuse	86–85	Joe Graboski (26)	1–1
3	November 18	vs. New York	94–96	Paul Arizin (29)	1–2
4	November 20	Fort Wayne	82–99	Paul Arizin (23)	2–2
5	November 24	vs. Fort Wayne	91–87	Paul Arizin (28)	3–2
6	November 25	Boston	98–103	Arizin, Johnston (28)	4–2
7	November 30	@ New York	91–95 (OT)	Neil Johnston (32)	4–3
8	December 1	Minneapolis	91–88	Paul Arizin (28)	4–4
9	December 3	vs. Milwaukee	110–91	Neil Johnston (25)	5–4
10	December 4	Syracuse	73–79	Neil Johnston (27)	6–4
11	December 5	@ Syracuse	72–89	Neil Johnston (21)	6–5
12	December 7	vs. Syracuse	88–81	Paul Arizin (20)	6–6
13	December 8	vs. New York	86–77	Jack George (21)	7–6
14	December 9	New York	98–96	Neil Johnston (23)	7–7
15	December 12	@ Syracuse	96–87	Neil Johnston (25)	8–7
16	December 15	vs. Fort Wayne	99–90	Neil Johnston (26)	9–7
17	December 18	@ Boston	103–107	Arizin, Johnston (22)	9–8
18	December 19	vs. Rochester	92–79	Paul Arizin (22)	9–9
19	December 23	vs. Fort Wayne	92–82	Paul Arizin (17)	9–10
20	December 25	@ Minneapolis	91–99	Paul Arizin (32)	9–11
21	December 26	@ Fort Wayne	96–109	Paul Arizin (20)	9–12
22	December 28	@ New York	84–78	Neil Johnston (25)	10–12
23	December 29	Syracuse	70–72	Paul Arizin (23)	11–12
24	December 31	vs. Boston	113–119	Paul Arizin (38)	11–13
25	January 1	@ Rochester	92–96	Neil Johnston (25)	11–14
26	January 2	@ Fort Wayne	66–89	Neil Johnston (17)	11–15
27	January 3	vs. Minneapolis	74–76	Neil Johnston (21)	11–16
28	January 5	Minneapolis	85–106	Neil Johnston (24)	12–16
29	January 6	vs. Milwaukee	92–79	Neil Johnston (27)	13–16
30	January 8	@ Boston	105–117	Neil Johnston (27)	13–17
31	January 9	@ New York	84–86	Neil Johnston (21)	13–18
32	January 13	Minneapolis	96–102 (OT)	Joe Graboski (31)	14–18
33	January 14	@ Milwaukee	84–86	Paul Arizin (28)	14–19
34	January 15	@ Milwaukee	93–88	George Dempsey (21)	15–19
35	January 16	@ Minneapolis	98–106	Neil Johnston (34)	15–20
36	January 19	vs. Syracuse	98–97 (OT)	Neil Johnston (22)	15–21
37	January 21	vs. Boston	89–90	Paul Arizin (22)	15–22
38	January 22	@ New York	102–99	Neil Johnston (31)	16–22
39	January 23	@ Boston	91–94 (OT)	Paul Arizin (29)	16–23
40	January 26	vs. Syracuse	107–99	Joe Graboski (33)	16–24
41	January 27	New York	83–92	Paul Arizin (25)	17–24
42	January 29	@ Rochester	85–87	Neil Johnston (26)	17–25
43	January 30	@ Syracuse	93–83	Paul Arizin (21)	18–25
44	February 2	vs. Boston	122–107	Paul Arizin (28)	19–25
45	February 4	Rochester	101–109	Neil Johnston (45)	20–25
46	February 5	Fort Wayne	96–88	Neil Johnston (30)	20–26
47	February 6	@ Boston	113–109	Neil Johnston (28)	21–26
48	February 8	vs. Milwaukee	95–102	Joe Graboski (25)	21–27
49	February 10	@ Fort Wayne	97–105	Arizin, Graboski (18)	21–28
50	February 11	Boston	101–105	Paul Arizin (34)	22–28
51	February 13	@ Minneapolis	93–103	Neil Johnston (34)	22–29
52	February 14	vs. Rochester	72–79	Neil Johnston (21)	23–29
53	February 15	vs. Rochester	113–114	Paul Arizin (36)	24–29
54	February 16	vs. Rochester	96–98	Neil Johnston (26)	25–29
55	February 17	vs. Rochester	73–78	Paul Arizin (22)	26–29
56	February 18	Syracuse	86–110	Neil Johnston (35)	27–29
57	February 20	@ Boston	99–114	Neil Johnston (27)	27–30
58	February 22	@ New York	102–103	Neil Johnston (22)	27–31
59	February 23	vs. New York	98–96	Neil Johnston (34)	28–31
60	February 25	New York	111–113 (3OT)	Paul Arizin (26)	29–31
61	February 26	@ Rochester	80–88	Neil Johnston (25)	29–32
62	February 27	@ Syracuse	77–105	Neil Johnston (23)	29–33
63	February 28	vs. Milwaukee	101–84	Paul Arizin (23)	30–33
64	March 1	Milwaukee	91–88	Neil Johnston (26)	30–34
65	March 2	vs. Milwaukee	78–75	Paul Arizin (22)	31–34
66	March 5	Boston	89–95	Paul Arizin (30)	32–34
67	March 6	@ Syracuse	101–107	Neil Johnston (24)	32–35
68	March 8	vs. Boston	103–112	Neil Johnston (24)	32–36
69	March 9	Minneapolis	89–102	Neil Johnston (29)	33–36
70	March 10	vs. Fort Wayne	91–93 (OT)	Walt Davis (19)	33–37
71	March 12	vs. Minneapolis	78–86	Neil Johnston (20)	33–38
72	March 14	vs. Milwaukee	84–99	Paul Arizin (37)	33–39

== Awards and records ==
- Paul Arizin, NBA All-Star Game
- Neil Johnston, NBA All-Star Game
- Neil Johnston, NBA Scoring Champion
- Neil Johnston, All-NBA First Team
