= Neil Johnston =

American basketball player

Personal information
- Born: February 4, 1929 Chillicothe, Ohio, U.S.
- Died: September 28, 1978 (aged 49) Irving, Texas, U.S.
- Listed height: 6 ft 8 in (2.03 m)
- Listed weight: 210 lb (95 kg)

Career information
- High school: Chillicothe (Chillicothe, Ohio)
- College: Ohio State (1946–1948)
- NBA draft: 1950: undrafted
- Playing career: 1951–1959
- Position: Center
- Number: 6
- Coaching career: 1959–1965

Career history

Playing
- 1951–1959: Philadelphia Warriors
- 1961–1962: Pittsburgh Rens

Coaching
- 1959–1961: Philadelphia Warriors
- 1961–1963: Pittsburgh Rens
- 1964–1966: Wilmington Blue Bombers

Career highlights
- As player: NBA champion (1956); 6× NBA All-Star (1953–1958); 4× All-NBA First Team (1953–1956); All-NBA Second Team (1957); 3× NBA scoring champion (1953–1955); NBA rebounding leader (1955); As head coach: EPBL champion (1966)

Career playing statistics
- Points: 10,023 (19.4 ppg)
- Rebounds: 5,856 (11.3 rpg)
- Assists: 1,269 (2.5 apg)
- Stats at NBA.com
- Stats at Basketball Reference

Career coaching record
- NBA: 95–59 (.617)
- Record at Basketball Reference
- Basketball Hall of Fame
- Collegiate Basketball Hall of Fame

Donald Neil Johnston (February 4, 1929 – September 28, 1978) was an American basketball player and coach. A center, Johnston played in the National Basketball Association (NBA) from 1951 to 1959. He was a member of the Philadelphia Warriors for his entire career. Known for his hook shot, Johnston was a six-time NBA All-Star; he led the NBA in scoring three times and led the league in rebounding once. He won an NBA championship with the Warriors in 1956. After his playing career ended due to a knee injury, Johnston coached in the NBA, in other professional basketball leagues, and at the collegiate level. He was inducted into the Naismith Memorial Basketball Hall of Fame as a player in 1990.

== Early life ==
Johnston was born on February 4, 1929. He was a 1946 graduate of Chillicothe High School in Chillicothe, Ohio, where he was an all-state player in basketball. He led the Red Devils to an undefeated 16–0 regular season and ranked second in Ohio in 1945–46 as the team won its finale 82–19 behind Johnston's 38 points. He averaged 23.7 per game that year, playing only about half of some games. The team was upset in their second postseason game. Johnston was named second team All-Ohio Associated Press Class A (large school). He was also a high jumper on the track team and qualified for the state track meet and he was on the tennis team.

Johnston attended Ohio State University, where he played both baseball and basketball.

Johnston signed a professional baseball contract with the Philadelphia Phillies after two years of college. After failing to distinguish himself in minor league baseball, he tried out for the NBA's Philadelphia Warriors at the team camp in Hershey, Pennsylvania in 1951 and was signed to a contract.

== Professional basketball career ==
Johnston played for the Philadelphia Warriors from 1951 to 1959. He spent his entire playing career with the Warriors. The 6-foot-8-inch (2.03 m) Johnston was known for his sweeping right-handed hook shot.

Johnston led the NBA in scoring for three consecutive seasons: 1952–53, 1953–54, and 1954–55. During the 1954–55 season, he also won the league's rebounding title. He led the league in field goal percentage in the 1952–53, 1955–56, and 1956–57 seasons.

Johnston was a member of the Warriors' NBA championship-winning 1956 team. He played in six NBA All-Star Games, was an All-NBA First Team selection four times, and was an All-NBA Second Team selection once.

Johnston was forced to retire after the 1958–59 season due to a knee injury. During his eight-year career, he averaged 19.4 points per game, 11.5 rebounds and 2.5 assists, with a field goal percentage of .444 and a free throw percentage of .768.

== Coaching career ==
After his playing career ended, Johnston was head coach of the Philadelphia Warriors during the 1959–60 and 1960–61 seasons before resigning. Johnston coached the Warriors during the first two seasons of Wilt Chamberlain's NBA career, compiling a record of 95–59. He also worked as an assistant coach under Jack McCloskey with the Portland Trail Blazers and at Wake Forest University.

Johnston coached the Pittsburgh Rens of the American Basketball League and the Wilmington Blue Bombers of the Eastern Professional Basketball League (EPBL); he won an EPBL championship in 1966. In addition, he coached at Chemeketa Community College. His last job was as athletic director at North Lake College in Irving, Texas.

== Death and legacy ==
On September 28, 1978, Johnston died of a heart attack at age 49 while playing basketball with his son, Scott, in Bedford, Texas. A memorial service was held at North Lake College and at St. Paul's Methodist Church in Hurst, Texas. He was survived by his wife, Phyllis (Wilson); three daughters, Nancy, Barbara and Kay; and twin sons Daniel and Scott; and three brothers.

In 1980, Johnston was inducted into the Pennsylvania Sports Hall of Fame. In 1990, he was enshrined in the Naismith Memorial Basketball Hall of Fame and the Ohio Basketball Hall of Fame. Johnston was inducted into the National Collegiate Basketball Hall of Fame in 2006.

== NBA career statistics ==
Legend
GP	Games played	GS	Games started	MPG	Minutes per game
FG%	Field goal percentage	3P%	3-point field goal percentage	FT%	Free throw percentage
RPG	Rebounds per game	APG	Assists per game	SPG	Steals per game
BPG	Blocks per game	PPG	Points per game	**Bold**	Career high
†	Won an NBA championship	*	Led the league

=== Regular season ===
Year	Team	GP	MPG	FG%	FT%	RPG	APG	PPG
1951–52	Philadelphia	64	15.5	**.472**	.662	5.3	0.6	6.0
1952–53	Philadelphia	70	45.2*	.452*	.700	13.9	2.8	22.3*
1953–54	Philadelphia	**72**	**45.8***	.449	.747	11.1	2.8	**24.4***
1954–55	Philadelphia	**72**	40.5	.440	.766	**15.1***	3.0	22.7*
1955–56†	Philadelphia	70	37.1	.457*	.801	12.5	**3.2**	22.1
1956–57	Philadelphia	69	36.7	.447*	**.826**	12.4	2.9	22.8
1957–58	Philadelphia	71	33.9	.429	.819	11.1	2.3	19.5
1958–59	Philadelphia	28	14.0	.329	.784	5.0	0.8	6.3
Career		516	35.5	.444	.768	11.3	2.5	19.4
All-Star		6	22.0	.429	.696	8.6	1.0	11.7

=== Playoffs ===
Year	Team	GP	MPG	FG%	FT%	RPG	APG	PPG
1952	Philadelphia	3	10.7	**.500**	.750	3.3	0.3	5.3
1956†	Philadelphia	**10**	39.7	.408	.707	14.3	**5.1**	**20.3**
1957	Philadelphia	2	**42.0**	.321	.667	**17.5**	4.5	19.0
1958	Philadelphia	8	23.6	.385	**.818**	8.6	1.8	10.9
Career		23	30.5	.390	.734	11.2	3.3	15.0

== Head coaching record ==
Legend
Regular season	G	Games coached	W	Games won	L	Games lost	W–L %	Win–loss %
Playoffs	PG	Playoff games	PW	Playoff wins	PL	Playoff losses	PW–L %	Playoff win–loss %

Team	Year	G	W	L	W–L%	Finish	PG	PW	PL	PW–L%	Result
Philadelphia	1959–60	75	49	26	.653	2nd in Eastern	9	4	5	.444	Lost in Division finals
Philadelphia	1960–61	79	46	33	.582	2nd in Eastern	3	0	3	.000	Lost in Division semifinals
Career		154	95	59	.617		12	4	8	.333	

== See also ==
- List of NBA annual minutes leaders
- List of NBA annual scoring leaders
- List of NBA annual rebounding leaders
