= Ken Sears =

American basketball player (1933–2017)

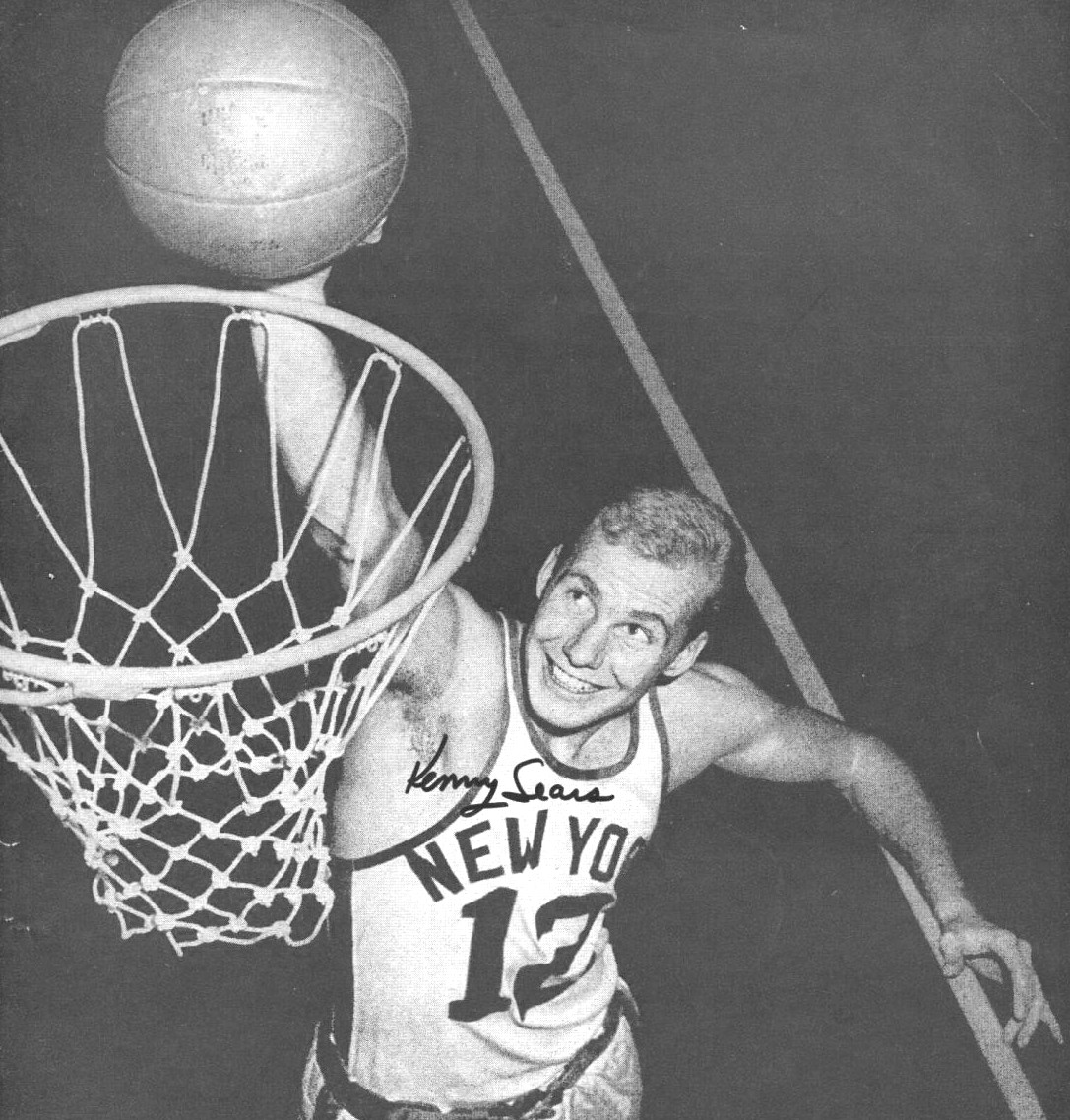
- c. 1958

Personal information
- Born: August 17, 1933 Watsonville, California, U.S.
- Died: April 23, 2017 (aged 83) Watsonville, California, U.S.
- Listed height: 6 ft 9 in (2.06 m)
- Listed weight: 198 lb (90 kg)

Career information
- High school: Watsonville (Watsonville, California)
- College: Santa Clara (1951–1955)
- NBA draft: 1955: 1st round, 5th overall pick
- Drafted by: New York Knicks
- Playing career: 1955–1964
- Position: Power forward / small forward
- Number: 12, 20, 17

Career history
- 1955–1961: New York Knicks
- 1961–1962: San Francisco Saints
- 1962: New York Knicks
- 1962–1964: San Francisco Warriors

Career highlights
- 2× NBA All-Star (1958, 1959); All-ABL Second Team (1962); Third-team All-American – UP, NEA (1955); 2× WCC Player of the Year (1953, 1955); No. 55 retired by Santa Clara Broncos; California Mr. Basketball (1951)

Career NBA statistics
- Points: 7,355 (13.9 ppg)
- Rebounds: 4,142 (7.8 rpg)
- Assists: 843 (1.6 apg)
- Stats at NBA.com
- Stats at Basketball Reference

Kenneth Robert Sears (August 17, 1933 – April 23, 2017) was an American professional basketball player in the National Basketball Association (NBA). He was the first basketball player on the cover of Sports Illustrated magazine, appearing on the December 20, 1954, issue during his senior season in college.

A 6 ft 9 in (2.06 m) forward, Sears was a first round selection of the New York Knicks in the 1955 NBA draft and played eight seasons (1955–1961, 1962–1964) in the NBA with the Knicks and San Francisco Warriors. He averaged 13.9 points per game and 7.8 rebounds per game in his NBA career, appearing as an NBA All-Star in 1958 and 1959. Sears also led the NBA in field goal percentage in consecutive years (1959, 1960).

== College career ==
Born and raised in Watsonville, California, Sears graduated from its high school in 1951 and played college basketball at nearby Santa Clara University. As a freshman, Sears led the Broncos to the final four (semifinals) of the NCAA tournament in 1952, held in Seattle.

Sears spent four years at Santa Clara, twice being named the West Coast Conference player of the year, in 1953 and 1955. Leading the Broncos to the NCAA tournament in three consecutive years from 1952 to 1954, Sears was named the NCAA Tournament All-Region teams in all three tournaments. In addition to making the NCAA final four in 1952, he led the Broncos to the NCAA elite eight in 1953 and 1954. In Sears' senior season with the Broncos he was named an all-American before leaving for the NBA.

== Professional career ==
=== New York Knicks (1956-1961) ===
Sears was selected with the fifth overall selection in the 1955 NBA draft by the New York Knicks. He led the Knicks in scoring in two seasons, averaging 18.6 points per game in 1958 and 21 points per game in 1959. In 1958 and 1959, Sears was selected as an NBA All-Star.

The 1961 season was frustrating for Sears and the Knicks, who went 21–58. Sears would miss several games due to breaking his jaw after a fight with George Lee of the Detroit Pistons. He would eventually leave the Knicks, breaching his contract to join the San Francisco Saints of the American Basketball League (ABL).

=== San Francisco Saints (1962) ===
Sears spent the 1961–62 season with the San Francisco Saints in the short-lived American Basketball League (ABL).

=== Return to the Knicks (1963) ===
After his return from the ABL, Sears would only play in 23 games for the Knicks before being traded to the San Francisco Warriors. In the 1963 season with the Knicks, Sears would average just 5.3 points per game.

=== San Francisco Warriors (1963-1964) ===
Sears played two seasons with the Warriors, making the NBA finals in 1964 before losing to the Boston Celtics. After losing the championship to the Celtics in five games, Sears would retire from basketball.

== NBA career statistics ==
Legend
GP	Games played	GS	Games started	MPG	Minutes per game
FG%	Field goal percentage	3P%	3-point field goal percentage	FT%	Free throw percentage
RPG	Rebounds per game	APG	Assists per game	SPG	Steals per game
BPG	Blocks per game	PPG	Points per game	**Bold**	Career high
†	Won an NBA championship	*	Led the league

=== Regular season ===
Year	Team	GP	MPG	FG%	FT%	RPG	APG	PPG
1955–56	New York	70	29.6	.438	.796	8.8	1.6	12.8
1956–57	New York	**72***	34.9	.418	.790	8.5	1.4	14.8
1957–58	New York	**72***	**37.3**	.439	.822	10.9	1.8	18.6
1958–59	New York	71	35.2	.490*	.861	9.3	1.9	**21.0**
1959–60	New York	64	32.8	.477*	**.868**	**13.6**	**2.0**	18.5
1960–61	New York	52	26.8	.424	.825	5.6	**2.0**	14.4
1962–63	New York	23	15.6	.522	.565	2.9	1.7	5.3
1962-63	San Francisco	54	14.5	**.533**	.861	2.6	1.0	6.1
1963–64	San Francisco	51	10.2	.442	.810	1.8	0.8	3.3
Career		529	28.2	.455	.826	7.8	1.6	13.9
All-Star		2	20.0	.529	.900	4.5	0.5	13.5

=== Playoffs ===
Year	Team	GP	MPG	FG%	FT%	RPG	APG	PPG
1959	New York	2	**32.0**	.370	**.867**	**8.5**	**3.0**	**16.5**
1964	San Francisco	**7**	3.4	**.432**	–	1.7	0.4	1.7
Career		9	9.8	.432	.867	3.2	1.0	5.0
