= 1958–59 Boston Celtics season =

NBA basketball team season (won NBA championship)

- NBA champions
- Division champions
- Head coach: Red Auerbach
- Arena: Boston Garden

Results
- Record: 52–20 (.722)
- Place: Division: 1st (Eastern)
- Playoff finish: NBA champions (Defeated Lakers 4–0)
- Stats at Basketball Reference
- Radio: WHDH

The 1958–59 Boston Celtics season was the 13th season for the franchise in the National Basketball Association (NBA). The Celtics finished the season by winning the first of eight consecutive NBA World Championships, and their second title overall. On February 27, 1959, the Celtics blew out the Minneapolis Lakers 173-139 and set a still-standing franchise-record for points in a game. 173 points scored by Boston would also be the record for the highest-scoring amount done before the three-point line would be implemented by the NBA in the 1979–80 season (albeit initially as a gimmick), though that specific record would be tied without a three-pointer made in 1990 by the Phoenix Suns. HoopsHype would later rank this championship squad as the team with the easiest path to the NBA Finals ever in 2024 due to them being the only championship team who had playoff opponents that averaged less than an average .500 record during their championship run.

== Regular season ==
=== Season standings ===
Eastern Division	W	L	PCT	GB	Home	Road	Neutral	Div
x-Boston Celtics	52	20	.722	–	26–4	13–15	13–1	23–13
x-New York Knicks	40	32	.556	12	21–9	15–15	4–8	19–17
x-Syracuse Nationals	35	37	.486	17	17–9	7–24	8–7	14–22
Philadelphia Warriors	32	40	.444	20	17–9	7–24	8–7	14–22

=== Game log ===
1958–59 Game log
#	Date	Opponent	Score	High points	Record
1	October 25	@ New York	125–127 (OT)	Bill Sharman (28)	0–1
2	November 1	Detroit	98–112	Tom Heinsohn (31)	1–1
3	November 5	@ Syracuse	117–115	Bill Russell (28)	2–1
4	November 8	@ St. Louis	84–87	Tom Heinsohn (22)	2–2
5	November 9	@ Detroit	133–136	Bill Russell (32)	2–3
6	November 11	Minneapolis	113–116 (OT)	Bill Russell (20)	3–3
7	November 15	Cincinnati	105–130	Frank Ramsey (33)	4–3
8	November 18	N Detroit	102–115	Russell, Sharman (20)	5–3
9	November 19	@ Cincinnati	103–119	Bill Russell (27)	5–4
10	November 21	N New York	112–106	Bill Russell (25)	5–5
11	November 22	Philadelphia	100–105	Bill Sharman (26)	6–5
12	November 24	N Minneapolis	104–123	Bob Cousy (23)	7–5
13	November 26	New York	109–121	Bill Sharman (22)	8–5
14	November 27	@ Philadelphia	107–94	Bill Sharman (31)	9–5
15	November 29	Detroit	96–110	Tom Heinsohn (19)	10–5
16	December 2	@ New York	109–90	Bill Sharman (23)	11–5
17	December 3	St. Louis	119–110	Bill Sharman (28)	11–6
18	December 4	N Syracuse	114–116	Bill Sharman (29)	12–6
19	December 6	Syracuse	101–92	Bill Russell (21)	12–7
20	December 7	@ Syracuse	104–108	Frank Ramsey (17)	12–8
21	December 10	Philadelphia	97–100	Bob Cousy (23)	13–8
22	December 11	@ Philadelphia	123–114	Bob Cousy (28)	14–8
23	December 12	Cincinnati	115–125 (OT)	Bob Cousy (30)	15–8
24	December 16	N Syracuse	104–108	Frank Ramsey (25)	16–8
25	December 17	@ Detroit	102–95	Bill Sharman (25)	17–8
26	December 18	@ Cincinnati	104–90	Bill Sharman (21)	18–8
27	December 20	New York	106–135	Bob Cousy (21)	19–6
28	December 25	@ New York	129–120	Bill Russell (32)	20–8
29	December 26	N Minneapolis	99–107	Frank Ramsey (26)	21–8
30	December 27	@ Minneapolis	112–94	Bob Cousy (34)	22–8
31	December 29	Syracuse	105–107	Bill Russell (28)	23–8
32	December 30	@ Philadelphia	105–112	Bill Sharman (26)	23–9
33	January 3	@ St. Louis	110–116	Bill Sharman (24)	23–10
34	January 4	@ Cincinnati	111–108	Bob Cousy (26)	24–10
35	January 5	Minneapolis	106–118	Bob Cousy (30)	25–10
36	January 6	N Cincinnati	95–109	Bill Sharman (23)	26–10
37	January 7	N New York	78–109	Tom Heinsohn (23)	27–10
38	January 9	@ Detroit	103–90	Bob Cousy (25)	28–10
39	January 11	N Minneapolis	106–109 (OT)	Heinsohn, Sharman (26)	29–10
40	January 12	N Minneapolis	108–117	Tom Heinsohn (38)	30–10
41	January 14	New York	112–123	Heinsohn, Russell (25)	31–10
42	January 16	@ Philadelphia	98–105	Bob Cousy (27)	31–11
43	January 18	St. Louis	117–139	Bill Sharman (36)	32–11
44	January 20	@ St. Louis	114–119	Bill Russell (23)	32–12
45	January 21	@ Syracuse	112–134	Bill Sharman (27)	32–13
46	January 24	Philadelphia	104–132	Tom Heinsohn (26)	33–13
47	January 25	Detroit	118–119 (OT)	Bob Cousy (29)	34–13
48	January 28	St. Louis	111–120 (OT)	Frank Ramsey (30)	35–13
49	January 31	Philadelphia	102–137	Bill Sharman (30)	36–13
50	February 1	Syracuse	137–139 (OT)	Bob Cousy (32)	37–13
51	February 3	N St. Louis	97–104	Cousy, Ramsey (23)	38–13
52	February 4	New York	129–126	Ramsey, Russell (22)	38–14
53	February 6	St. Louis	95–122	Tom Heinsohn (29)	39–14
54	February 7	@ New York	124–116	Cousy, Heinsohn (28)	40–14
55	February 8	Cincinnati	117–136	Tom Heinsohn (36)	41–14
56	February 9	@ Philadelphia	113–121	Bob Cousy (32)	41–15
57	February 11	Philadelphia	118–120	Bob Cousy (31)	42–15
58	February 14	Syracuse	121–124	Tom Heinsohn (24)	43–15
59	February 15	Detroit	94–120	Bill Sharman (31)	44–15
60	February 17	N Philadelphia	84–95	Bill Sharman (24)	45–15
61	February 19	@ Syracuse	105–113	Tom Heinsohn (24)	45–16
62	February 20	@ Detroit	111–106 (OT)	Frank Ramsey (31)	46–16
63	February 22	@ Cincinnati	129–112	Tom Heinsohn (27)	47–16
64	February 24	@ New York	122–134	Bob Cousy (33)	47–17
65	February 26	N Philadelphia	109–125	Heinsohn, Ramsey (21)	48–17
66	February 27	Minneapolis	139–173	Tom Heinsohn (43)	49–17
67	March 1	@ St. Louis	102–104	Tom Heinsohn (23)	49–18
68	March 3	N Minneapolis	112–119	Tom Heinsohn (30)	50–18
69	March 4	Syracuse	114–120	Bill Sharman (26)	51–18
70	March 5	@ Syracuse	118–142	Bill Sharman (23)	51–19
71	March 8	Cincinnati	131–141	Bill Sharman (29)	52–19
72	March 10	New York	138–116	Bob Cousy (37)	52–20

== Playoffs ==
1959 playoff game log
Division Finals: 4–3 (home: 4–0; road: 0–3)

Game	Date	Team	Score	High points	High rebounds	High assists	Location	Series
1	March 18	Syracuse	W 131–109	Tom Heinsohn (28)	Bill Russell (32)	—	Boston Garden	1–0
2	March 21	@ Syracuse	L 118–120	Bob Cousy (27)	Bill Russell (19)	—	Onondaga War Memorial	1–1
3	March 22	Syracuse	W 133–111	Frank Ramsey (24)	Bill Russell (27)	—	Boston Garden	2–1
4	March 25	@ Syracuse	L 107–119	Frank Ramsey (29)	Bill Russell (21)	—	Onondaga War Memorial	2–2
5	March 28	Syracuse	W 129–108	Bob Cousy (27)	Bill Russell (32)	—	Boston Garden	3–2
6	March 29	@ Syracuse	L 121–133	Frank Ramsey (26)	Bill Russell (24)	—	Onondaga War Memorial	3–3
7	April 1	Syracuse	W 130–125	Frank Ramsey (28)	Bill Russell (32)	Bob Cousy (10)	Boston Garden	4–3

NBA Finals: 4–0 (home: 2–0; road: 2–0)

Game	Date	Team	Score	High points	High rebounds	Location Attendance	Series
1	April 4	Minneapolis	W 118–115	Frank Ramsey (29)	Bill Russell (28)	Boston Garden; 8,195	1–0
2	April 5	Minneapolis	W 128–108	Bill Sharman (28)	Bill Russell (30)	Boston Garden; 11,082	2–0
3	April 7	@ Minneapolis	W 123–110	Tom Heinsohn (26)	Bill Russell (30)	St. Paul Auditorium; 11,272	3–0
4	April 9	@ Minneapolis	W 118–113	Bill Sharman (29)	Bill Russell (30)	Minneapolis Auditorium; 8,124	4–0

1959 schedule

=== Roster ===
1958-59 Boston Celtics roster
Players

Pos.	No.	Player	Height	Weight	DOB	From
PF	17	Gene Conley	6 ft 8 in (2.03 m)	225 lb (102 kg)	1930–11–10	Washington State
PG	14	Bob Cousy	6 ft 1 in (1.85 m)	175 lb (79 kg)	1928-08-09	Holy Cross
PF	15	Tom Heinsohn	6 ft 7 in (2.01 m)	218 lb (99 kg)	1934–08–26	Holy Cross
PG	25, 27	K.C. Jones	6 ft 1 in (1.85 m)	200 lb (91 kg)	1932–05–25	San Francisco
SG	24	Sam Jones	6 ft 4 in (1.93 m)	198 lb (90 kg)	1933-06-24	North Carolina Central
SF	18	Jim Loscutoff	6 ft 5 in (1.96 m)	220 lb (100 kg)	1930–02–04	Oregon
SG	23	Frank Ramsey	6 ft 3 in (1.91 m)	190 lb (86 kg)	1931–07–13	Kentucky
C	6	Bill Russell	6 ft 10 in (2.08 m)	215 lb (98 kg)	1934–2–12	San Francisco
SG	21	Bill Sharman	6 ft 1 in (1.85 m)	175 lb (79 kg)	1926–05–25	USC
PF	16	Bennie Swain	6 ft 8 in (2.03 m)	220 lb (100 kg)	1933–12–16	Texas Southern
SF	20	Lou Tsioropoulos	6 ft 5 in (1.96 m)	190 lb (86 kg)	1930–08–31	Kentucky

Coaches
Head coach
- Red Auerbach

Legend
- (DP) Unsigned draft pick
- (FA) Free agent
- (S) Suspended
- Injured

Roster

== Awards and honors ==
- Bob Cousy, All-NBA First Team
- Bill Russell, All-NBA First Team
- Bill Sharman, All-NBA First Team
