= Willie Naulls =

American basketball player (1934–2018)

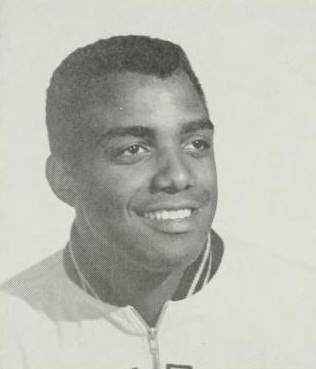
- Naulls from 1956 UCLA yearbook

Personal information
- Born: October 7, 1934 Dallas, Texas, U.S.
- Died: November 22, 2018 (aged 84) Laguna Niguel, California, U.S.
- Listed height: 6 ft 6 in (1.98 m)
- Listed weight: 225 lb (102 kg)

Career information
- High school: San Pedro (San Pedro, California)
- College: UCLA (1953–1956)
- NBA draft: 1956: 2nd round, 9th overall pick
- Drafted by: St. Louis Hawks
- Playing career: 1956–1966
- Position: Small forward
- Number: 33, 6, 71, 12

Career history
- 1956: St. Louis Hawks
- 1956–1962: New York Knicks
- 1962–1963: San Francisco Warriors
- 1963–1966: Boston Celtics

Career highlights
- 3× NBA champion (1964–1966); 4× NBA All-Star (1958, 1960–1962); Consensus second-team All-American (1956); 2× First-team All-PCC (1955, 1956); California Mr. Basketball (1952)

Career NBA statistics
- Points: 11,305 (15.8 ppg)
- Rebounds: 6,508 (9.1 rpg)
- Assists: 1,114 (1.6 apg)
- Stats at NBA.com
- Stats at Basketball Reference

William Dean Naulls (October 7, 1934 – November 22, 2018) was an American professional basketball player for 10 years in the National Basketball Association (NBA). He was a four-time NBA All-Star with the New York Knicks and won three NBA championships with the Boston Celtics.

Naulls grew up in California, where he was named the state's Mr. Basketball in high school. He played college basketball with the UCLA Bruins, and earned All-American honors as a senior in 1956. Naulls was selected by the St. Louis Hawks (known now as the Atlanta Hawks) with the ninth overall pick of the 1956 NBA draft. He played briefly with St. Louis before being traded to New York, where he spent most of his career. With the Knicks, he became the first African American to be named a captain of a professional team in a major American sport. After a brief stint with the San Francisco Warriors (now the Golden State Warriors), Naulls finished his career with Boston Celtics. In December 1964, he was part of a Celtics unit that became the first all-black starting lineup in the NBA history.

== Early life ==
Naulls was born in Dallas, Texas, to Daily and Bettie (Artis) Naulls. During World War II, the family moved to Los Angeles when he was nine to escape racial segregation. His father worked at shipyards in San Pedro, and his mother was a domestic worker. Naulls was a basketball star at San Pedro High, where he was named California Mr. Basketball in 1952.

== College career ==
Naulls attended the University of California, Los Angeles (UCLA), where he played for the Bruins under future Basketball Hall of Fame coach John Wooden. In December 1954 during his junior year, UCLA won 47–40 over San Francisco, who were led by Naulls' future Boston teammates Bill Russell and K. C. Jones. Naulls outplayed Russell in the Dons' lone defeat of the season en route to their first of two consecutive national championships.

As a senior in 1955–56, Naulls set the Bruins single-game rebounding record with 28 against Arizona State, and he finished the season with 582 field goal attempts to set the school's single-season record. UCLA won the Pacific Coast Conference championship and advanced to the NCAA tournament that season, while Naulls was named a consensus second-team All-American.

In his three seasons at UCLA, Naulls averaged 15.5 points and 11.4 rebounds per game. At the time his career ended, he was the Bruins' career leader in both points (1,225) and rebounds (900). He was inducted into the UCLA Athletics Hall of Fame in 1986.

== NBA career ==
Naulls was selected by the St. Louis Hawks in the second round of the 1956 NBA draft with the ninth overall pick. He called it a "culture shock" to see the segregation that existed in St. Louis, the likes of which he had not seen since he was eight before moving to Southern California. He spent just 19 games with the Hawks before being traded to the New York Knicks, with whom he would spend the next several seasons.

Naulls averaged a double-double (19.3 points and 10.7 rebounds per game) during his seven-year tenure with the Knicks, and he appeared as an NBA All-Star four times. The Knicks named him their captain in 1960, making him the first African-American athlete to hold the position for any pro team in a major American sport. In 1960–61, Naulls scored a single-season team record of 1,846 points, averaging 23.4 points per game. The record was broken the following season by teammate Richie Guerin. On March 2, 1962, Naulls scored 31 points and established another team record with his seventh straight game scoring 30 points or more. In that same game, Philadelphia Warriors center Wilt Chamberlain notched his NBA record 100-point game against the Knicks. Naulls' 30+ streak stood until 2010, when it was broken by Amar'e Stoudemire.

During the 1962–63 NBA season, the Knicks traded Naulls to the San Francisco Warriors, with whom he played briefly before being traded to the Boston Celtics. Naulls spent his last three professional seasons with the Celtics, winning three consecutive NBA championships in the process. In December 1964 against St. Louis, he replaced an injured Tom Heinsohn to form NBA's first all-black starting lineup along with Russell at center, K. C. and Sam Jones at the guards and Satch Sanders at forward. That 1964–65 Celtics team was named one of the 10 best teams in NBA history during the league's 50th anniversary. The 6-foot-6-inch (1.98 m) Naulls finished his 10-year NBA career with averages of 15.8 points and 9.1 rebounds per game.

== NBA career statistics ==
Legend
GP	Games played	GS	Games started	MPG	Minutes per game
FG%	Field goal percentage	3P%	3-point field goal percentage	FT%	Free throw percentage
RPG	Rebounds per game	APG	Assists per game	SPG	Steals per game
BPG	Blocks per game	PPG	Points per game	**Bold**	Career high
†	Won an NBA championship	*	Led the league

=== Regular season ===
Year	Team(s)	GP	MPG	FG%	FT%	RPG	APG	PPG
1956–57	St. Louis	19	23.1	.365	.683	8.8	1.2	10.3
1956–57	New York	52	25.8	.355	.504	8.7	1.2	10.1
1957–58	New York	68	34.8	.397	.826	11.8	1.4	18.1
1958–59	New York	68	30.3	.378	.830	10.6	1.5	15.7
1959–60	New York	65	34.6	**.428**	.836	**14.2**	2.1	21.4
1960–61	New York	**79***	37.7	**.428**	.816	13.4	2.4	23.4
1961–62	New York	75	**39.7**	.415	**.842**	11.6	**2.6**	**25.0**
1962–63	New York	23	29.4	.413	.813	8.7	1.9	16.9
1962-63	San Francisco	47	26.1	.420	.793	6.7	1.2	11.0
1963–64†	Boston	78	18.1	.417	.796	4.6	0.8	9.8
1964–65†	Boston	71	20.5	.384	.813	4.7	1.0	10.5
1965–66†	Boston	71	20.2	.402	.794	4.5	1.0	10.7
Career		716	28.8	.406	.812	9.1	1.6	15.8
All-Star		4	19.3	.340	.750	6.5	0.5	10.0

=== Playoffs ===
Year	Team	GP	MPG	FG%	FT%	RPG	APG	PPG
1959	New York	2	**31.5**	.333	.750	**10.5**	**1.5**	**17.0**
1964†	Boston	10	16.7	.389	.739	4.6	0.8	9.1
1965†	Boston	**12**	15.0	**.411**	.667	4.3	0.8	7.3
1966†	Boston	11	6.8	.257	**.810**	1.5	0.1	3.2
Career		35	13.9	.371	.746	3.8	0.6	7.1

== Death ==
Naulls died on November 22, 2018, in Laguna Niguel, California, from respiratory failure due to eosinophilic granulomatosis with polyangiitis, which he had been battling for eight years.

== See also ==
- Race and ethnicity in the NBA
