= Joe Graboski =

American basketball player (1930–1998)

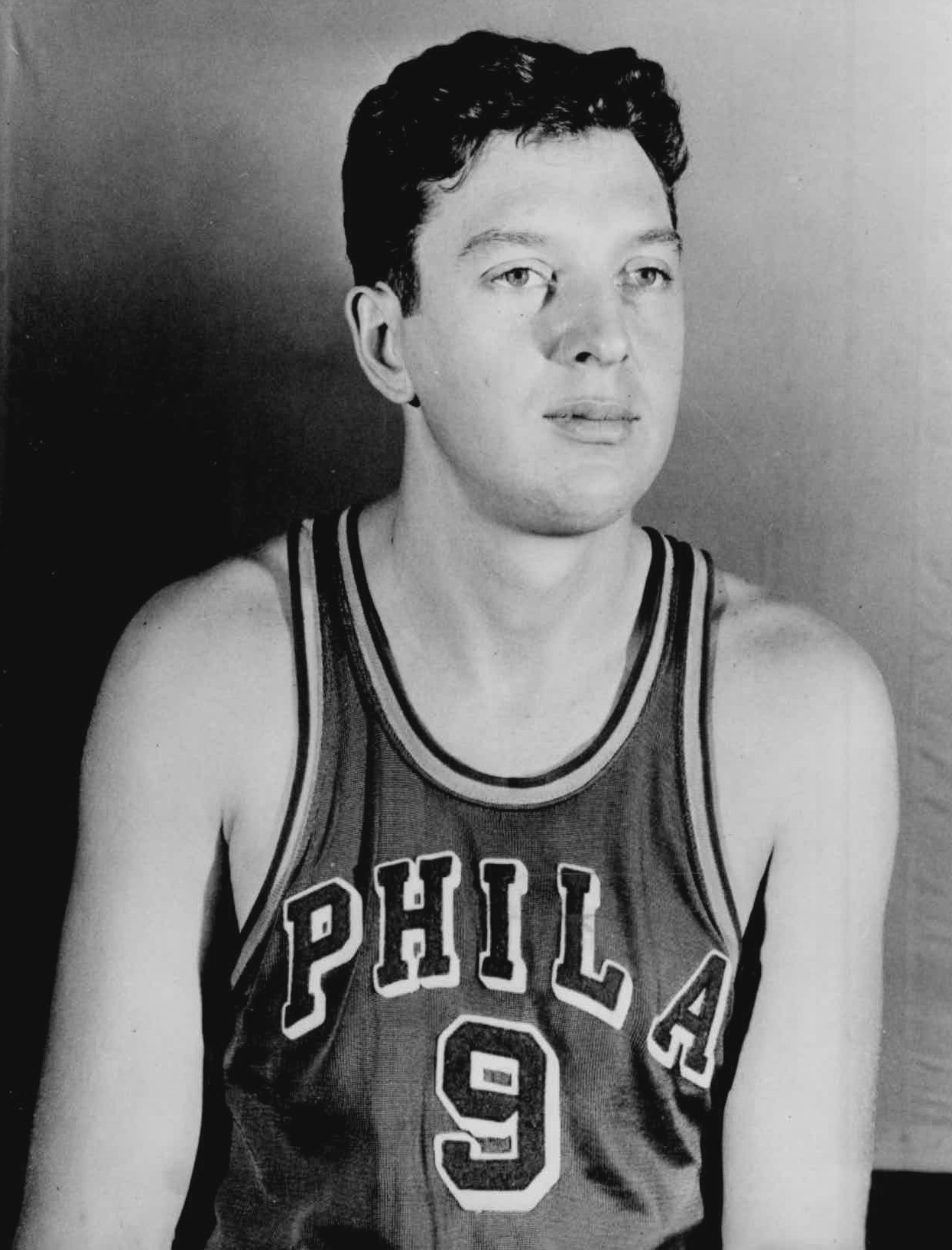

Personal information
- Born: January 15, 1930 Chicago, Illinois, U.S.
- Died: July 2, 1998 (aged 68) Columbus, Ohio, U.S.
- Listed height: 6 ft 7 in (2.01 m)
- Listed weight: 195 lb (88 kg)

Career information
- High school: Tuley (Chicago, Illinois)
- Playing career: 1948–1967
- Position: Power forward / center
- Number: 15, 9, 29, 23, 44

Career history
- 1948–1950: Chicago Stags
- 1950–1951: Kansas City Hi-Spots
- 1951: Louisville Alumnites
- 1951–1953: Indianapolis Olympians
- 1953–1961: Philadelphia Warriors
- 1961: St. Louis Hawks
- 1961: Chicago Packers
- 1961–1962: Syracuse Nationals
- 1962–1963: Camden Bullets
- 1966–1967: Asbury Park Boardwalkers

Career highlights
- NBA champion (1956)

Career NBA statistics
- Points: 9,280
- Rebounds: 5,999
- Assists: 1,502
- Stats at NBA.com
- Stats at Basketball Reference

Joseph William Graboski (January 15, 1930 – July 2, 1998) was an American professional basketball player. He spent 13 seasons in the National Basketball Association (NBA). He was the third player to enter the NBA without having played in college: (Tony Kappen and Connie Simmons being the first two prep-to-pro players). He was also the second player to play in the league while still being 18 years old. A star at Tuley High School in Chicago, the 6'7" power forward had previously played some basketball with the Illinois Tool Works while he was a high school junior and senior before he began his professional career with the hometown Chicago Stags, with whom he played from 1949 to 1950. He also played for the Indianapolis Olympians, Philadelphia Warriors, St. Louis Hawks, and Chicago Packers, and he left the NBA in 1962 with 9,398 career points and 6,104 career rebounds.

== BAA/NBA career statistics ==
Legend
| GP | Games played | GS | Games started | MPG | Minutes per game |
| FG% | Field goal percentage | 3P% | 3-point field goal percentage | FT% | Free throw percentage |
| RPG | Rebounds per game | APG | Assists per game | SPG | Steals per game |
| BPG | Blocks per game | PPG | Points per game | **Bold** | Career high |
| † | Won an NBA championship |

=== Regular season ===
| Year | Team | GP | MPG | FG% | FT% | RPG | APG | PPG |
|---|---|---|---|---|---|---|---|---|
| 1948–49 | Chicago | 45 | – | .344 | .357 | – | .4 | 2.8 |
| 1949–50 | Chicago | 57 | – | .304 | .596 | – | .6 | 3.6 |
| 1951–52 | Indianapolis | 66 | 37.0 | **.387** | .667 | 9.9 | 2.0 | 13.7 |
| 1952–53 | Indianapolis | 69 | **40.1** | .340 | .682 | 10.0 | 2.3 | 13.0 |
| 1953–54 | Philadelphia | 71 | 38.9 | .354 | .674 | 9.4 | 2.3 | 13.3 |
| 1954–55 | Philadelphia | 70 | 35.9 | .340 | .686 | 9.1 | **2.6** | 13.6 |
| 1955–56† | Philadelphia | 72 | 33.0 | .369 | .706 | 8.9 | **2.6** | 14.4 |
| 1956–57 | Philadelphia | 72 | 34.7 | .349 | **.783** | 8.5 | 1.9 | 14.3 |
| 1957–58 | Philadelphia | 72 | 28.8 | .335 | .749 | 7.9 | 1.7 | 12.6 |
| 1958–59 | Philadelphia | 72 | 34.5 | .353 | .750 | **10.4** | 2.1 | **14.7** |
| 1959–60 | Philadelphia | **73** | 17.4 | .372 | .753 | 4.9 | 1.5 | 7.7 |
| 1960–61 | Philadelphia | 68 | 14.9 | .333 | .694 | 3.9 | 1.1 | 6.8 |
| 1961–62 | St. Louis / Chicago / Syracuse | 38 | 12.3 | .348 | .600 | 4.1 | .7 | 5.1 |
| Career | | 845 | 30.5 | .352 | .700 | 8.1 | 1.8 | 11.0 |

=== Playoffs ===
| Year | Team | GP | MPG | FG% | FT% | RPG | APG | PPG |
|---|---|---|---|---|---|---|---|---|
| 1949 | Chicago | 1 | – | .000 | .000 | – | .0 | .0 |
| 1950 | Chicago | 1 | – | .000 | .000 | – | .0 | .0 |
| 1952 | Indianapolis | 2 | **48.0** | .396 | .533 | **11.5** | 1.5 | **23.0** |
| 1953 | Indianapolis | 2 | 38.0 | **.500** | .750 | 8.0 | .0 | 17.0 |
| 1956† | Philadelphia | **10** | 31.3 | .344 | .743 | 9.4 | 2.7 | 13.2 |
| 1957 | Philadelphia | 2 | 45.5 | .325 | .818 | 11.0 | 2.0 | 17.5 |
| 1958 | Philadelphia | 8 | 31.5 | .290 | .783 | 10.3 | **3.8** | 12.3 |
| 1960 | Philadelphia | 9 | 14.3 | .293 | .778 | 3.3 | 1.0 | 4.6 |
| 1961 | Philadelphia | 1 | 1.0 | .000 | .000 | .0 | .0 | .0 |
| 1962 | Syracuse | 4 | 6.0 | .143 | **1.000** | 1.0 | .0 | .8 |
| Career | | 40 | 25.8 | .328 | .735 | 7.1 | 1.8 | 9.7 |
