= 1956–57 Philadelphia Warriors season =

NBA professional basketball team season

- Head coach: George Senesky
- Arena: Philadelphia Civic Center

Results
- Record: 37–35 (.514)
- Place: Division: 3rd (Eastern)
- Playoff finish: East Division Semifinals (lost to Nationals 0–2)
- Stats at Basketball Reference

Local media
- Television: WPTZ/WCAU/WFIL
- Radio: WIBG (Bill Campbell)

The 1956–57 Philadelphia Warriors season was the Warriors' 11th season in the NBA. The team entered the season as the defending NBA champions. Finishing 3rd in the East with a 37–35 record, they clinched a berth in the 1957 NBA playoffs. However, they were unable to defend their title as they suffered a two-game sweep by the Syracuse Nationals in the East Division Semifinals.

== Roster ==
1956–57 Philadelphia Warriors roster
Players

Pos.	No.	Player	Height	Weight	DOB	From
F	11	Paul Arizin	6 ft 4 in (1.93 m)	190 lb (86 kg)		Villanova
F/C	19	Bob Armstrong	6 ft 8 in (2.03 m)	220 lb (100 kg)		Michigan State
G	7	Ernie Beck	6 ft 4 in (1.93 m)	190 lb (86 kg)		Penn
G	18	Larry Costello	6 ft 1 in (1.85 m)	186 lb (84 kg)		Niagara
F/C	12	Walt Davis	6 ft 8 in (2.03 m)	205 lb (93 kg)		Texas A&M
G	5	George Dempsey	6 ft 2 in (1.88 m)	190 lb (86 kg)		King's (NY)
G	17	Jack George	6 ft 2 in (1.88 m)	190 lb (86 kg)		La Salle
F/C	9	Joe Graboski	6 ft 7 in (2.01 m)	195 lb (88 kg)		Tuley HS (IL)
F	14	Lew Hitch	6 ft 8 in (2.03 m)	200 lb (91 kg)		Kansas State
C	6	Neil Johnston	6 ft 8 in (2.03 m)	210 lb (95 kg)		Ohio State
G	16	Hal Lear	6 ft 0 in (1.83 m)	163 lb (74 kg)		Temple
F	4	Jackie Moore	6 ft 5 in (1.96 m)	180 lb (82 kg)		La Salle

Coaches
Head coach
- George Senesky (Saint Joseph's)

Legend
- (DP) Unsigned draft pick
- (FA) Free agent
- (S) Suspended
- Injured

== Regular season ==
=== Season standings ===
Eastern Division	W	L	PCT	GB	Home	Road	Neutral	Div
x-Boston Celtics	44	28	.611	-	24-4	11-18	9-6	20-16
x-Syracuse Nationals	38	34	.528	6	23-9	9-15	6-10	20-16
x-Philadelphia Warriors	37	35	.514	7	20-5	5–25	12-5	17-19
New York Knicks	36	36	.500	8	18-10	9-19	9-7	15-21

x – clinched playoff spot

=== Game log ===
1956–57 Game log
#	Date	Opponent	Score	High points	Record
1	October 27	N Syracuse	109–103 (2OT)	Neil Johnston (31)	0–1
2	November 3	Fort Wayne	81–116	Paul Arizin (26)	1–1
3	November 7	@ Rochester	80–81	Neil Johnston (23)	1–2
4	November 9	Rochester	95–93	Paul Arizin (25)	1–3
5	November 10	New York	81–83	Neil Johnston (31)	2–3
6	November 11	@ New York	95–106	Neil Johnston (26)	2–4
7	November 15	N Rochester	83–92	Arizin, Johnston (23)	3–4
8	November 16	Minneapolis	97–123	Paul Arizin (27)	4–4
9	November 17	N Syracuse	96–109	Neil Johnston (31)	5–4
10	November 18	@ Syracuse	97–99	Neil Johnston (24)	5–5
11	November 21	@ Boston	83–95	Paul Arizin (22)	5–6
12	November 22	Boston	101–78	Paul Arizin (29)	5–7
13	November 24	Fort Wayne	88–98	Neil Johnston (27)	6–7
14	November 25	@ Fort Wayne	88–112	Neil Johnston (22)	6–8
15	November 27	N Minneapolis	98–113	Paul Arizin (28)	6–9
16	November 30	New York	99–110	Neil Johnston (31)	7–9
17	December 1	@ St. Louis	107–95	Paul Arizin (37)	8–9
18	December 2	@ Minneapolis	96–106	Joe Graboski (29)	8–10
19	December 6	Boston	111–113	Paul Arizin (26)	9–10
20	December 8	@ Rochester	91–92	Paul Arizin (32)	9–11
21	December 11	Minneapolis	111–114	Paul Arizin (30)	10–11
22	December 12	St. Louis	99–115	Neil Johnston (35)	11–11
23	December 15	@ Syracuse	117–108	Neil Johnston (26)	12–11
24	December 16	N Boston	116–104	Paul Arizin (31)	13–11
25	December 23	@ New York	95–90	Neil Johnston (26)	14–11
26	December 25	N Boston	89–82	Paul Arizin (22)	15–11
27	December 26	@ Boston	97–120	Paul Arizin (25)	15–12
28	December 27	New York	87–112	Neil Johnston (23)	16–12
29	December 29	Syracuse	104–103 (OT)	Neil Johnston (30)	16–13
30	December 30	@ Fort Wayne	99–104	Paul Arizin (35)	16–14
31	January 1	N Boston	87–100	Neil Johnston (20)	16–15
32	January 3	N St. Louis	81–82	Paul Arizin (22)	17–15
33	January 4	St. Louis	92–96	Paul Arizin (28)	18–15
34	January 5	@ Rochester	81–78	Paul Arizin (30)	19–15
35	January 6	@ Syracuse	123–128	Paul Arizin (37)	19–16
36	January 8	N Rochester	95–94	Paul Arizin (28)	19–17
37	January 10	Rochester	93–112	Arizin, George (23)	20–17
38	January 12	New York	82–116	Joe Graboski (29)	21–17
39	January 13	@ New York	90–101	Paul Arizin (26)	21–18
40	January 17	Syracuse	108–103	Neil Johnston (23)	21–19
41	January 18	N Syracuse	94–96	Paul Arizin (33)	22–19
42	January 20	@ St. Louis	102–104 (OT)	Neil Johnston (33)	22–20
43	January 23	N New York	99–93	Neil Johnston (27)	23–20
44	January 24	St. Louis	96–107	Paul Arizin (29)	24–20
45	January 26	@ Fort Wayne	98–101	Neil Johnston (27)	24–21
46	January 27	Boston	107–87	Neil Johnston (30)	24–22
47	January 28	@ Boston	95–105	Paul Arizin (24)	24–23
48	January 29	@ New York	110–114	Neil Johnston (38)	24–24
49	January 31	N New York	106–102	Paul Arizin (35)	25–24
50	February 2	Syracuse	100–107	Paul Arizin (31)	26–24
51	February 3	N Rochester	108–110	Neil Johnston (31)	27–24
52	February 4	@ Fort Wayne	91–103	Neil Johnston (19)	27–25
53	February 5	@ St. Louis	101–87	Paul Arizin (33)	28–25
54	February 6	@ Minneapolis	100–101	Neil Johnston (35)	28–26
55	February 8	St. Louis	90–93	Paul Arizin (35)	29–26
56	February 10	@ Boston	98–103 (OT)	Paul Arizin (26)	29–27
57	February 13	Fort Wayne	89–99	Paul Arizin (28)	30–27
58	February 15	N Minneapolis	104–105	Neil Johnston (30)	31–27
59	February 17	New York	115–123	Arizin, Graboski (25)	32–27
60	February 21	@ Syracuse	86–92	Paul Arizin (28)	32–28
61	February 22	Boston	109–117	Joe Graboski (31)	33–28
62	February 24	@ St. Louis	112–113	Paul Arizin (37)	33–29
63	February 28	Minneapolis	112–129	Paul Arizin (32)	34–29
64	March 1	@ Boston	80–90	Paul Arizin (22)	34–30
65	March 2	N Syracuse	85–98	Paul Arizin (37)	35–30
66	March 3	@ Syracuse	86–112	Arizin, Graboski (22)	35–31
67	March 5	N Fort Wayne	114–80	Paul Arizin (23)	36–31
68	March 6	@ Rochester	79–82	Paul Arizin (27)	36–32
69	March 7	Fort Wayne	100–114	Arizin, Graboski (28)	37–32
70	March 10	@ New York	103–104	Paul Arizin (27)	37–33
71	March 12	N Minneapolis	94–100	Neil Johnston (24)	37–34
72	March 13	@ Minneapolis	97–114	Neil Johnston (22)	37–35

== Playoffs ==
1957 playoff game log
Division Semifinals: 0–2 (home: 0–1; road: 0–1)

Game	Date	Team	Score	High points	High rebounds	High assists	Location	Series
1	March 16	Syracuse	L 96–103	Neil Johnston (25)	Neil Johnston (26)	George Dempsey (8)	Philadelphia Civic Center	0–1
2	March 18	@ Syracuse	L 80–91	Joe Graboski (16)	Walt Davis (10)	Neil Johnston (5)	Onondaga War Memorial	0–2

1957 schedule

== Awards and records ==
- Paul Arizin, NBA All-Star Game
- Neil Johnston, NBA All-Star Game
- Paul Arizin, NBA scoring champion
- Paul Arizin, All-NBA First Team
- Neil Johnston, All-NBA Second Team
