= 1958–59 Syracuse Nationals season =

Season for the Nationals in the National Basketball Association

- Head coach: Paul Seymour
- Arena: Onondaga War Memorial

Results
- Record: 35–37 (.486)
- Place: Division: 3rd (Eastern)
- Playoff finish: East Division Finals (eliminated 3–4)
- Stats at Basketball Reference

The 1958–59 Syracuse Nationals season was the Nationals' 10th season in the NBA.

== Roster ==
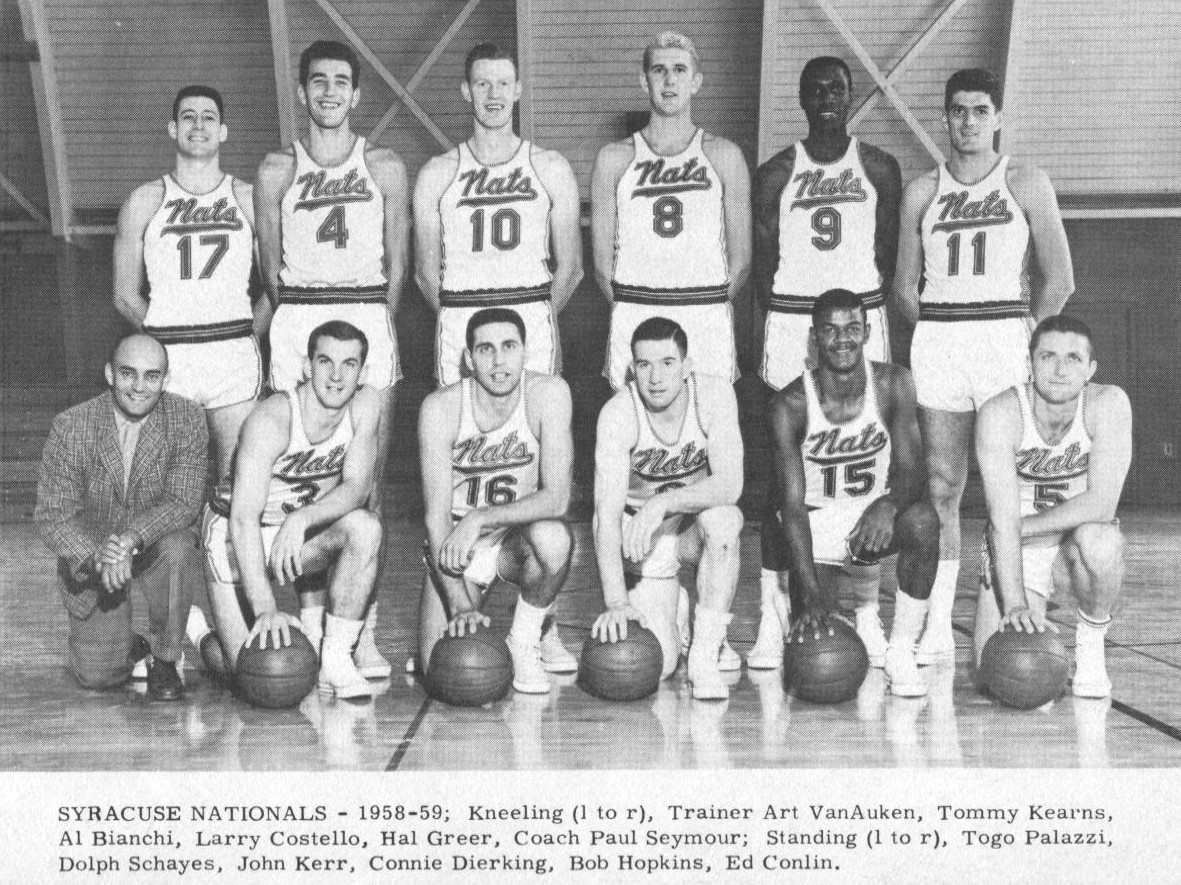
The 1958–59 Syracuse Nationals

1958-59 Syracuse Nationals roster
Players

Pos.	No.	Player	Height	Weight	DOB	From
PG	16	Al Bianchi	6 ft 3 in (1.91 m)	185 lb (84 kg)	1932-03-26	Bowling Green
G/F	11	Ed Conlin	6 ft 5 in (1.96 m)	200 lb (91 kg)	1933-09-02	Fordham
PG	6	Larry Costello	6 ft 1 in (1.85 m)	186 lb (84 kg)	1931-07-02	Niagara
PG	3	George Dempsey	6 ft 2 in (1.88 m)	190 lb (86 kg)	1929-07-19	King's (NY)
C	8	Connie Dierking	6 ft 9 in (2.06 m)	222 lb (101 kg)	1936-10-02	Cincinnati
SG	15	Hal Greer	6 ft 2 in (1.88 m)	175 lb (79 kg)	1936-06-26	Marshall
PF	9	Bob Hopkins	6 ft 8 in (2.03 m)	205 lb (93 kg)	1934-11-03	Grambling State
G	3	Tommy Kearns	5 ft 11 in (1.80 m)	185 lb (84 kg)	1936-10-06	North Carolina
C	10	Red Kerr	6 ft 9 in (2.06 m)	230 lb (104 kg)	1932-07-17	Illinois
SF	17	Togo Palazzi	6 ft 4 in (1.93 m)	205 lb (93 kg)	1932-08-08	Holy Cross
PF	4	Dolph Schayes	6 ft 8 in (2.03 m)	220 lb (100 kg)	1928-05-19	NYU
SG	5	Paul Seymour	6 ft 1 in (1.85 m)	180 lb (82 kg)	1928-01-30	Toledo
SF	12	George Yardley	6 ft 5 in (1.96 m)	190 lb (86 kg)	1928-11-03	Stanford

Coaches
Head coach

Paul Seymour

Legend
- (DP) Unsigned draft pick
- (FA) Free agent
- (S) Suspended
- Injured

Roster

== Regular season ==
=== Season standings ===
Eastern Division	W	L	PCT	GB	Home	Road	Neutral	Div
x-Boston Celtics	52	20	.722	–	26–4	13–15	13–1	23–13
x-New York Knicks	40	32	.556	12	21–9	15–15	4–8	19–17
x-Syracuse Nationals	35	37	.486	17	17–9	7–24	8–7	14–22
Philadelphia Warriors	32	40	.444	20	17–9	7–24	8–7	14–22

x – clinched playoff spot

=== Game log ===
1958–59 Game log
#	Date	Opponent	Score	High points	Record
1	October 19	Detroit	94–103	Dolph Schayes (18)	1–0
2	October 25	Philadelphia	110–109	Dolph Schayes (34)	1–1
3	November 1	Cincinnati	108–130	Bob Hopkins (23)	2–1
4	November 5	Boston	117–115	Bob Hopkins (26)	2–2
5	November 8	@ Philadelphia	103–98	Johnny Kerr (24)	3–2
6	November 9	Minneapolis	97–101	Al Bianchi (21)	4–2
7	November 12	@ Cincinnati	116–115	Dolph Schayes (32)	5–2
8	November 14	@ Detroit	111–109	Johnny Kerr (30)	6–2
9	November 15	New York	96–92	Al Bianchi (18)	6–3
10	November 18	@ St. Louis	120–94	Larry Costello (28)	7–3
11	November 20	@ Minneapolis	102–121	Johnny Kerr (17)	7–4
12	November 22	@ New York	99–114	Dolph Schayes (17)	7–5
13	November 23	@ Philadelphia	107–110	Johnny Kerr (25)	7–6
14	November 26	St. Louis	112–107	Johnny Kerr (20)	7–7
15	November 27	@ St. Louis	98–107	Kerr, Schayes (23)	7–8
16	November 28	@ Detroit	93–101	Larry Costello (20)	7–9
17	November 29	Minneapolis	108–105	Dolph Schayes (25)	7–10
18	December 4	N Boston	114–116	Johnny Kerr (28)	7–11
19	December 6	@ Boston	101–92	Dolph Schayes (23)	8–11
20	December 7	Boston	104–108	Johnny Kerr (24)	9–11
21	December 9	N Philadelphia	106–90	Johnny Kerr (22)	10–11
22	December 10	@ Cincinnati	97–94	Costello, Kerr (19)	11–11
23	December 11	@ Minneapolis	101–99 (OT)	Al Bianchi (27)	12–11
24	December 13	Philadelphia	100–115	Dolph Schayes (28)	13–11
25	December 14	@ Detroit	101–95	Costello, Schayes (23)	14–11
26	December 16	N Boston	104–108	Dolph Schayes (23)	14–12
27	December 20	Cincinnati	121–120 (OT)	Johnny Kerr (24)	14–13
28	December 21	@ New York	94–108	Dolph Schayes (20)	14–14
29	December 27	New York	106–102	Larry Costello (23)	14–15
30	December 29	@ Boston	105–107	Bob Hopkins (25)	14–16
31	December 30	N Minneapolis	113–118	Dolph Schayes (30)	14–17
32	January 1	Minneapolis	106–105	Dolph Schayes (32)	14–18
33	January 2	@ Philadelphia	117–107	Larry Costello (29)	15–18
34	January 4	Detroit	94–118	Johnny Kerr (31)	16–18
35	January 6	@ New York	108–118	Dolph Schayes (24)	16–19
36	January 7	Philadelphia	99–111	Johnny Kerr (26)	17–19
37	January 8	@ Cincinnati	145–138 (3OT)	Johnny Kerr (30)	18–19
38	January 11	Cincinnati	110–127	Johnny Kerr (33)	19–19
39	January 14	N Philadelphia	119–104	Johnny Kerr (25)	20–19
40	January 15	Minneapolis	105–111	Greer, Schayes (21)	21–19
41	January 16	@ St. Louis	89–102	Dolph Schayes (19)	21–20
42	January 18	New York	120–118	Johnny Kerr (28)	21–21
43	January 21	Boston	112–134	Hal Greer (22)	22–21
44	January 24	Cincinnati	102–123	Dierking, Greer (17)	23–21
45	January 25	@ Cincinnati	104–109	Dolph Schayes (34)	23–22
46	January 27	@ Detroit	121–107	Dolph Schayes (28)	24–22
47	January 28	@ Minneapolis	109–112	Dolph Schayes (34)	24–23
48	January 29	N Minneapolis	117–91	Costello, Greer (18)	25–23
49	January 31	N New York	117–119	Hal Greer (28)	25–24
50	February 1	@ Boston	137–139 (OT)	Dolph Schayes (50)	25–25
51	February 3	@ New York	114–115	Dolph Schayes (24)	25–26
52	February 4	St. Louis	113–111	Ed Conlin (23)	25–27
53	February 5	N New York	98–111	Dolph Schayes (20)	25–28
54	February 6	N Detroit	122–103	Costello, Schayes (25)	26–28
55	February 8	New York	104–113	Kerr, Schayes (25)	27–28
56	February 9	N St. Louis	94–99	Costello, Schayes (16)	27–29
57	February 11	Detroit	118–114 (OT)	Johnny Kerr (33)	27–30
58	February 14	@ Boston	121–124	Hal Greer (45)	27–31
59	February 15	Philadelphia	101–121	Dolph Schayes (25)	28–31
60	February 19	Boston	105–113	Dolph Schayes (33)	29–31
61	February 21	@ Philadelphia	112–113	Larry Costello (22)	29–32
62	February 22	Detroit	108–139	George Yardley (33)	30–32
63	February 24	N Cincinnati	109–113	George Yardley (26)	30–33
64	February 26	St. Louis	111–130	Dolph Schayes (31)	31–33
65	February 27	@ St. Louis	113–128	George Yardley (30)	31–34
66	March 1	New York	115–140	Dolph Schayes (20)	32–34
67	March 3	@ New York	127–120	Al Bianchi (22)	33–34
68	March 4	@ Boston	114–120	Dolph Schayes (24)	33–35
69	March 5	Boston	118–142	Dolph Schayes (25)	34–35
70	March 6	N Philadelphia	114–118	Togo Palazzi (37)	34–36
71	March 8	Philadelphia	103–133	Hal Greer (22)	35–36
72	March 11	St. Louis	132–130 (OT)	Dolph Schayes (29)	35–37

== Playoffs ==
1959 playoff game log
Division Semifinals: 2–0 (home: 1–0; road: 1–0)

Game	Date	Team	Score	High points	Location	Series
1	March 13	@ New York	W 129–123	Dolph Schayes (35)	Madison Square Garden III	1–0
2	March 15	New York	W 131–115	Red Kerr (34)	Onondaga War Memorial	2–0

Division Finals: 3–4 (home: 3–0; road: 0–4)

Game	Date	Team	Score	High points	High rebounds	High assists	Location	Series
1	March 18	@ Boston	L 109–131	George Yardley (30)	George Yardley (17)	—	Boston Garden	0–1
2	March 21	Boston	W 120–118	Dolph Schayes (34)	Schayes, Kerr (17)	—	Onondaga War Memorial	1–1
3	March 22	@ Boston	L 111–133	Dolph Schayes (21)	Connie Dierking (11)	—	Boston Garden	1–2
4	March 25	Boston	W 119–107	Dolph Schayes (28)	Dolph Schayes (18)	—	Onondaga War Memorial	2–2
5	March 28	@ Boston	L 108–129	George Yardley (23)	Schayes, Kerr (11)	—	Boston Garden	2–3
6	March 29	Boston	W 133–121	Dolph Schayes (39)	Dolph Schayes (12)	—	Onondaga War Memorial	3–3
7	April 1	@ Boston	L 125–130	Dolph Schayes (35)	Dolph Schayes (16)	Schayes, Costello (9)	Boston Garden	3–4

1959 schedule

== Awards and records ==
- Dolph Schayes, All-NBA Second Team
