= Vern Hatton =

American basketball player (1936–2025)

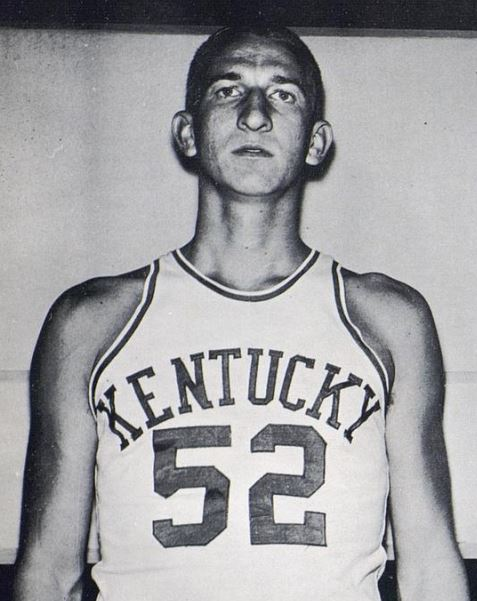
- Hatton from the 1958 Kentuckian

Personal information
- Born: January 13, 1936 Owingsville, Kentucky, U.S.
- Died: March 21, 2025 (aged 89)
- Listed height: 6 ft 3 in (1.91 m)
- Listed weight: 195 lb (88 kg)

Career information
- High school: Lafayette (Lexington, Kentucky)
- College: Kentucky (1955–1958)
- NBA draft: 1958: 2nd round, 9th overall pick
- Drafted by: Cincinnati Royals
- Playing career: 1958–1962
- Position: Shooting guard / point guard
- Number: 11, 20, 52, 17

Career history
- 1958: Cincinnati Royals
- 1958–1961: Philadelphia Warriors
- 1961: Chicago Packers
- 1961–1962: St. Louis Hawks

Career highlights
- NCAA champion (1958); Second-team All-SEC (1958); Kentucky Mr. Basketball (1954)

Career NBA statistics
- Points: 1,244 (5.5 ppg)
- Rebounds: 531 (2.4 rpg)
- Assists: 318 (1.4 apg)
- Stats at NBA.com
- Stats at Basketball Reference

Walter Vernon Hatton (January 13, 1936 – March 21, 2025) was an American basketball player who won a national championship as a player at the University of Kentucky and played professionally in the National Basketball Association (NBA).

== Kentucky career ==
Hatton played under Kentucky coach Adolph Rupp. He is considered a Kentucky basketball legend largely due to a memorable half-court shot he made to force a third overtime in a victory over Temple University. He was voted an honorable mention All-American his senior year and scored 30 points to lead the Kentucky Wildcats over Elgin Baylor-led Seattle in winning the 1958 NCAA men's basketball championship. Hatton was named a member of the NCAA All-Tournament team for 1958 along with Baylor, Johnny Cox, and Guy Rodgers. Hatton said of playing for Rupp, "It takes you six to eight years to get over playing for Adolph Rupp, but once you get over it, you get to like him."

== Professional career ==
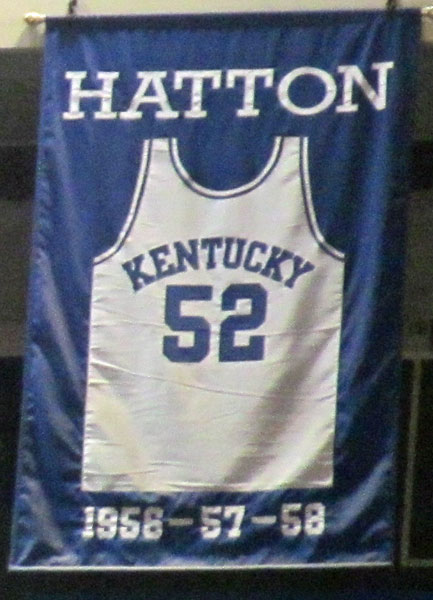
A jersey honoring Hatton hangs in Rupp Arena.

He was drafted 9th overall in the 1958 NBA draft by the Cincinnati Royals.

== Personal life and death ==
Hatton was married with three sons and was a member of the Church of Jesus Christ of Latter-day Saints.

Hatton died on March 21, 2025, at the age of 89.

== Career statistics ==
Legend
GP	Games played	GS	Games started	MPG	Minutes per game
FG%	Field goal percentage	3P%	3-point field goal percentage	FT%	Free throw percentage
RPG	Rebounds per game	APG	Assists per game	SPG	Steals per game
BPG	Blocks per game	PPG	Points per game	**Bold**	Career high

=== NBA ===
==== Regular season ====
Year	Team	GP	MPG	FG%	FT%	RPG	APG	PPG
1958–59	Cincinnati	22	**29.9**	.319	.667	**3.7**	1.4	7.5
1958–59	Philadelphia	42	10.8	**.393**	.796	2.3	1.0	5.0
1959–60	Philadelphia	**67**	15.7	.357	.609	2.4	1.2	4.6
1960–61	Philadelphia	54	11.3	.319	**.821**	1.7	1.1	4.4
1961–62	Chicago	15	26.4	.308	.754	3.0	**2.9**	**9.5**
1961–62	St. Louis	25	20.1	.362	**.821**	2.3	2.2	7.2
Career		225	16.3	.344	.735	2.4	1.4	5.5

==== Playoffs ====
Year	Team	GP	MPG	FG%	FT%	RPG	APG	PPG
1960	Philadelphia	6	2.8	.308	.333	.5	.2	1.5

== Additional reading ==
- Clark, Ryan (2007), Game of my Life: Kentucky – Memorable Stories of Wildcats Basketball, Champaign, Illinois: Sports Publishing
