= 1958–59 New York Knicks season =

Season of National Basketball Association team the New York Knicks

- Head coach: Andrew Levane
- General manager: Fred Podesta
- Arena: Madison Square Garden

Results
- Record: 40–32 (.556)
- Place: Division: 2nd (Eastern)
- Playoff finish: East Division semifinals (lost to Nationals 0–2)
- Stats at Basketball Reference

Local media
- Television: WPIX
- Radio: WINS

The 1958–59 New York Knicks season was the 13th season for the team in the National Basketball Association (NBA). In the regular season, the Knicks finished in second place in the Eastern Division with a 40–32 win–loss record, qualifying for the NBA playoffs for the first time since the 1955–56 season. New York lost in the first round to the Syracuse Nationals, two games to none.

== NBA draft ==
Note: This is not an extensive list; it only covers the first and second rounds, and any other players picked by the franchise that played at least one game in the league.

Round	Pick	Player	Position	Nationality	School/Club team
1	3	Mike Farmer	F	United States	San Francisco
1	4	Pete Brennan	F	United States	North Carolina
2	11	Joe Quigg	F/C	United States	North Carolina
4	27	Johnny Cox	G	United States	Kentucky

== Regular season ==
=== Season standings ===
Eastern Division	W	L	PCT	GB	Home	Road	Neutral	Div
x-Boston Celtics	52	20	.722	–	26–4	13–15	13–1	23–13
x-New York Knicks	40	32	.556	12	21–9	15–15	4–8	19–17
x-Syracuse Nationals	35	37	.486	17	17–9	7–24	8–7	14–22
Philadelphia Warriors	32	40	.444	20	17–9	7–24	8–7	14–22

x – clinched playoff spot

=== Game log ===
1958–59 game log
#	Date	Opponent	Score	High points	Record
1	October 25	Boston	125–127 (OT)	Ken Sears (33)	1–0
2	October 26	@ Philadelphia	100–94 (OT)	Willie Naulls (30)	2–0
3	November 1	Philadelphia	111–92	Ken Sears (20)	2–1
4	November 5	@ Cincinnati	108–97	Ken Sears (22)	3–1
5	November 7	@ Detroit	115–101	Ken Sears (41)	4–1
6	November 8	@ Minneapolis	108–100	Ken Sears (21)	5–1
7	November 13	St. Louis	102–119	Ken Sears (27)	6–1
8	November 15	@ Syracuse	96–92	Farmer, Guerin (16)	7–1
9	November 16	Minneapolis	90–98	Charlie Tyra (22)	8–1
10	November 21	N Boston	112–106	Carl Braun (26)	9–1
11	November 22	Syracuse	99–114	Ken Sears (23)	10–1
12	November 25	Cincinnati	115–113	Ken Sears (23)	10–2
13	November 26	@ Boston	109–121	Willie Naulls (28)	10–3
14	November 29	Philadelphia	103–115	Ken Sears (25)	11–3
15	November 30	@ Philadelphia	100–103	Richie Guerin (28)	11–4
16	December 2	Boston	109–90	Ken Sears (19)	11–5
17	December 3	@ Cincinnati	108–110	Ken Sears (23)	11–6
18	December 5	@ Detroit	110–108	Ken Sears (23)	12–6
19	December 6	Detroit	99–92	Ken Sears (24)	12–7
20	December 9	Minneapolis	97–110	Frank Selvy (24)	13–7
21	December 12	St. Louis	104–106	Ken Sears (25)	14–7
22	December 13	@ St. Louis	94–108	Frank Selvy (19)	14–8
23	December 14	@ Minneapolis	100–99	Richie Guerin (25)	15–8
24	December 16	Cincinnati	106–118	Ken Sears (21)	16–8
25	December 17	N St. Louis	136–122	Richie Guerin (25)	16–9
26	December 20	@ Boston	106–135	Guerin, Sears (16)	16–10
27	December 21	Syracuse	94–108	Willie Naulls (26)	17–10
28	December 25	Boston	129–120	Richie Guerin (34)	17–11
29	December 26	N Philadelphia	106–93	Ken Sears (23)	17–12
30	December 27	@ Syracuse	106–102	Ken Sears (32)	18–12
31	December 30	Detroit	90–93	Guerin, Sears (24)	19–12
32	January 2	@ Minneapolis	97–107	Ken Sears (24)	19–13
33	January 3	@ Detroit	106–102	Ken Sears (26)	20–13
34	January 4	@ St. Louis	122–114	Richie Guerin (25)	21–13
35	January 6	Syracuse	108–118	Ken Sears (24)	22–13
36	January 7	N Boston	78–109	Ken Sears (16)	22–14
37	January 10	@ Philadelphia	97–103	Willie Naulls (25)	22–15
38	January 11	Philadelphia	105–111	Ken Sears (36)	23–15
39	January 14	@ Boston	112–123	Ken Sears (24)	23–16
40	January 15	N Philadelphia	95–91	Ken Sears (17)	23–17
41	January 17	Cincinnati	105–117	Ken Sears (28)	24–17
42	January 18	@ Syracuse	120–118	Richie Guerin (23)	25–17
43	January 20	N Cincinnati	108–114	Frank Selvy (21)	25–18
44	January 21	@ Cincinnati	130–109	Guerin, Selvy (25)	26–18
45	January 24	Detroit	118–122 (OT)	Ken Sears (30)	27–18
46	January 25	@ St. Louis	111–115	Richie Guerin (41)	27–19
47	January 27	St. Louis	112–111 (OT)	Ken Sears (31)	27–20
48	January 31	N Syracuse	117–119	Ken Sears (26)	28–20
49	February 1	Philadelphia	113–105	Ken Sears (25)	28–21
50	February 3	Syracuse	114–115	Frank Selvy (21)	29–21
51	February 4	@ Boston	129–126	Richie Guerin (39)	30–21
52	February 5	N Syracuse	98–111	Frank Selvy (21)	31–21
53	February 7	Boston	124–116	Willie Naulls (23)	31–22
54	February 8	@ Syracuse	104–113	Richie Guerin (21)	31–23
55	February 9	@ Minneapolis	122–128	Willie Naulls (27)	31–24
56	February 12	@ St. Louis	105–106	Frank Selvy (27)	31–25
57	February 13	@ Detroit	90–96	Willie Naulls (26)	31–26
58	February 15	Cincinnati	97–124	Ken Sears (25)	32–26
59	February 17	St. Louis	93–112	Ken Sears (26)	33–26
60	February 18	@ Cincinnati	118–116	Richie Guerin (33)	34–26
61	February 20	N Minneapolis	106–116	Willie Naulls (17)	34–27
62	February 21	N Detroit	101–114	Ray Felix (19)	34–28
63	February 22	Philadelphia	90–111	Richie Guerin (22)	35–28
64	February 24	Boston	122–134	Richie Guerin (37)	36–28
65	February 25	@ Philadelphia	123–134	Willie Naulls (26)	36–29
66	February 28	Minneapolis	107–112	Ken Sears (28)	37–29
67	March 1	@ Syracuse	115–140	Willie Naulls (28)	37–30
68	March 3	Syracuse	127–120	Willie Naulls (27)	37–31
69	March 4	N Philadelphia	115–118	Richie Guerin (32)	38–31
70	March 5	N Minneapolis	115–135	Willie Naulls (22)	38–32
71	March 8	Detroit	120–127	Willie Naulls (24)	39–32
72	March 10	@ Boston	138–116	Guerin, Sears (22)	40–32

== Playoffs ==
1959 playoff game log
Division semifinals: 0–2 (home: 0–1; road: 0–1)

Game	Date	Team	Score	High points	Location	Series
1	March 13	Syracuse	L 123–129	Richie Guerin (24)	Madison Square Garden III	0–1
2	March 15	@ Syracuse	L 115–131	Willie Naulls (26)	Onondaga War Memorial	0–2

1959 schedule

== Awards and records ==
- Richie Guerin, All-NBA Second Team
