= 1958–59 Philadelphia Warriors season =

NBA professional basketball team season

- Head coach: Al Cervi
- Arena: Philadelphia Civic Center

Results
- Record: 32–40 (.444)
- Place: Division: 4th (Eastern)
- Playoff finish: Did not qualify
- Stats at Basketball Reference

Local media
- Television: WPTZ/WCAU/WFIL
- Radio: WIBG (Bill Campbell)

The 1958–59 Philadelphia Warriors season was the Warriors' 13th season in the NBA.

== Roster ==
1958–59 Philadelphia Warriors roster
Players

Pos.	No.	Player	Height	Weight	DOB	From
F	11	Paul Arizin	6 ft 4 in (1.93 m)	190 lb (86 kg)		Villanova
G	7	Ernie Beck	6 ft 4 in (1.93 m)	190 lb (86 kg)		Penn
G/F	15	Tom Gola	6 ft 6 in (1.98 m)	205 lb (93 kg)		La Salle
F/C	9	Joe Graboski	6 ft 7 in (2.01 m)	195 lb (88 kg)		Tuley HS (IL)
G	20	Vern Hatton	6 ft 3 in (1.91 m)	195 lb (88 kg)		Kentucky
F	12	Andy Johnson	6 ft 5 in (1.96 m)	215 lb (98 kg)		Portland
C	6	Neil Johnston	6 ft 8 in (2.03 m)	210 lb (95 kg)		Ohio State
G	25	Guy Rodgers	6 ft 0 in (1.83 m)	185 lb (84 kg)		Temple
F	18	Lennie Rosenbluth	6 ft 4 in (1.93 m)	190 lb (86 kg)		North Carolina
F/C	14	Woody Sauldsberry	6 ft 7 in (2.01 m)	220 lb (100 kg)		Texas Southern
F	16	Sparrow, Guy	6 ft 6 in (1.98 m)	218 lb (99 kg)		Detroit Mercy

Coaches
Head coach
- Al Cervi (East (HS))

Legend
- (DP) Unsigned draft pick
- (FA) Free agent
- (S) Suspended
- Injured

== Regular season ==
=== Season standings ===
Eastern Division	W	L	PCT	GB	Home	Road	Neutral	Div
x-Boston Celtics	52	20	.722	–	26–4	13–15	13–1	23–13
x-New York Knicks	40	32	.556	12	21–9	15–15	4–8	19–17
x-Syracuse Nationals	35	37	.486	17	17–9	7–24	8–7	14–22
Philadelphia Warriors	32	40	.444	20	17–9	7–24	8–7	14–22

x – clinched playoff spot

=== Game log ===
1958–59 game log
#	Date	Opponent	Score	High points	Record
1	October 25	@ Syracuse	110–109	Paul Arizin (27)	1–0
2	October 26	New York	100–94 (OT)	Paul Arizin (27)	1–1
3	November 1	@ New York	111–92	Paul Arizin (25)	2–1
4	November 2	Detroit	107–91	Paul Arizin (19)	2–2
5	November 6	@ Minneapolis	101–103	Tom Gola (22)	2–3
6	November 8	Syracuse	103–98	Paul Arizin (33)	2–4
7	November 9	@ Cincinnati	106–92	Paul Arizin (42)	3–4
8	November 14	@ St. Louis	100–110	Paul Arizin (27)	3–5
9	November 15	Minneapolis	101–106	Paul Arizin (36)	4–5
10	November 21	Cincinnati	90–108	Paul Arizin (25)	5–5
11	November 22	@ Boston	100–105	Paul Arizin (24)	5–6
12	November 23	Syracuse	107–110	Paul Arizin (30)	6–6
13	November 25	N St. Louis	105–106	Paul Arizin (20)	7–6
14	November 27	Boston	107–94	Woody Sauldsberry (25)	7–7
15	November 29	@ New York	103–115	Paul Arizin (25)	7–8
16	November 30	New York	100–103	Woody Sauldsberry (25)	8–8
17	December 2	@ Detroit	91–95	Woody Sauldsberry (21)	8–9
18	December 4	St. Louis	107–92	Paul Arizin (24)	8–10
19	December 6	@ St. Louis	97–107	Paul Arizin (29)	8–11
20	December 7	@ Cincinnati	103–90	Paul Arizin (26)	9–11
21	December 9	N Syracuse	106–90	Paul Arizin (30)	9–12
22	December 10	@ Boston	97–100	Paul Arizin (25)	9–13
23	December 11	Boston	123–114	Paul Arizin (29)	9–14
24	December 12	@ Detroit	95–97	Ernie Beck (20)	9–15
25	December 13	@ Syracuse	100–115	Paul Arizin (26)	9–16
26	December 20	@ Minneapolis	88–99	Paul Arizin (21)	9–17
27	December 21	@ St. Louis	86–98	Tom Gola (21)	9–18
28	December 26	N New York	106–93	Guy Rodgers (28)	10–18
29	December 27	St. Louis	108–114 (OT)	Woody Sauldsberry (25)	11–18
30	December 29	N Minneapolis	95–93	Paul Arizin (25)	12–18
31	December 30	Boston	105–112	Paul Arizin (35)	13–18
32	January 2	Syracuse	117–107	Woody Sauldsberry (41)	13–19
33	January 4	Minneapolis	111–95	Paul Arizin (23)	13–20
34	January 6	Detroit	107–105	Paul Arizin (34)	13–21
35	January 7	@ Syracuse	99–111	Paul Arizin (22)	13–22
36	January 10	New York	97–103	Paul Arizin (38)	14–22
37	January 11	@ New York	105–111	Arizin, Sauldsberry (21)	14–23
38	January 14	N Syracuse	119–104	Paul Arizin (34)	14–24
39	January 15	N New York	95–91	Paul Arizin (30)	15–24
40	January 16	Boston	98–105	Woody Sauldsberry (31)	16–24
41	January 17	@ Detroit	106–104	Woody Sauldsberry (24)	17–24
42	January 18	@ Minneapolis	98–119	Tom Gola (22)	17–25
43	January 21	Detroit	105–112	Paul Arizin (35)	18–25
44	January 24	@ Boston	104–132	Joe Graboski (24)	18–26
45	January 25	Minneapolis	111–125	Paul Arizin (39)	19–26
46	January 26	N Detroit	102–98	Joe Graboski (30)	20–26
47	January 27	N Cincinnati	92–100	Tom Gola (19)	20–27
48	January 28	Cincinnati	84–99	Tom Gola (26)	21–27
49	January 31	@ Boston	102–137	Woody Sauldsberry (18)	21–28
50	February 1	@ New York	113–105	Paul Arizin (36)	22–28
51	February 3	@ Cincinnati	103–120	Paul Arizin (23)	22–29
52	February 4	@ Detroit	117–119 (OT)	Paul Arizin (29)	22–30
53	February 5	St. Louis	95–106	Paul Arizin (28)	23–30
54	February 7	@ Minneapolis	97–109	Paul Arizin (25)	23–31
55	February 8	@ St. Louis	93–100	Paul Arizin (24)	23–32
56	February 9	Boston	113–121	Paul Arizin (25)	24–32
57	February 11	@ Boston	118–120	Guy Rodgers (27)	24–33
58	February 14	N Cincinnati	106–94	Paul Arizin (27)	25–33
59	February 15	@ Syracuse	101–121	Paul Arizin (29)	25–34
60	February 17	N Boston	84–95	Paul Arizin (26)	25–35
61	February 21	Syracuse	112–113	Paul Arizin (35)	26–35
62	February 22	@ New York	90–111	Paul Arizin (31)	26–36
63	February 25	New York	123–134	Paul Arizin (32)	27–36
64	February 26	N Boston	109–125	Paul Arizin (26)	27–37
65	March 1	N Minneapolis	98–100	Paul Arizin (24)	27–38
66	March 3	N Detroit	116–107	Paul Arizin (36)	28–38
67	March 4	N New York	115–118	Paul Arizin (36)	28–39
68	March 5	St. Louis	101–106	Paul Arizin (42)	29–39
69	March 6	N Syracuse	114–118	Paul Arizin (38)	30–39
70	March 7	Cincinnati	86–93	Paul Arizin (24)	31–39
71	March 8	@ Syracuse	103–133	Vernon Hatton (30)	31–40
72	March 10	@ Cincinnati	102–96	Andy Johnson (20)	32–40

== Awards and records ==
- Paul Arizin, NBA All-Star Game
- Paul Arizin, All-NBA Second Team
