= 1958–59 NBA season =

13th NBA season

- League: National Basketball Association
- Sport: Basketball
- Duration: October 17, 1958 – March 11, 1959; March 13 – April 1, 1959 (Playoffs); April 4–9, 1959 (Finals)
- Games: 72
- Teams: 8
- TV partner: NBC

Draft
- Top draft pick: Elgin Baylor
- Picked by: Minneapolis Lakers

Regular season
- Top seed: Boston Celtics
- Season MVP: Bob Pettit (St. Louis)
- Top scorer: Bob Pettit (St. Louis)

Playoffs
- Eastern champions: Boston Celtics
- Eastern runners-up: Syracuse Nationals
- Western champions: Minneapolis Lakers
- Western runners-up: St. Louis Hawks

Finals
- Champions: Boston Celtics
- Runners-up: Minneapolis Lakers

NBA seasons
- ← 1957–58 1959–60 →

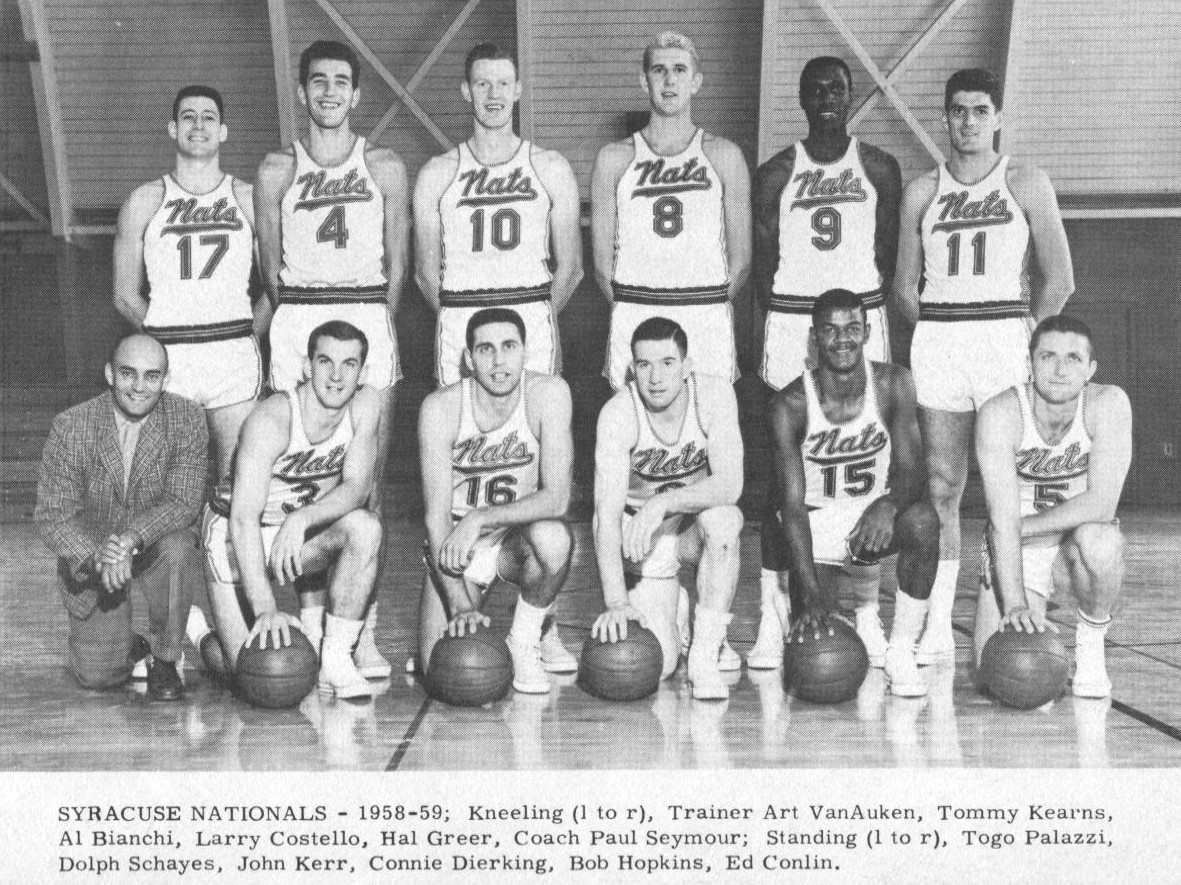
The 1958–59 Syracuse Nationals basketball team

The 1958–59 NBA season was the 13th season of the National Basketball Association. The season ended with the Boston Celtics winning the NBA championship (the first of what would be 8 straight), beating the Minneapolis Lakers 4 games to 0 in the NBA Finals.

== Notable occurrences ==
- The 1959 NBA All-Star Game was played in Detroit, Michigan, with the West beating the East 124–108. Bob Pettit of the St. Louis Hawks and Elgin Baylor of the Minneapolis Lakers shared the game's MVP award.
- The Boston Celtics set the record for the most points scored by a team in regulation, in their 173–139 victory over the Minneapolis Lakers.
- This is the only season in NBA history in which one team (Boston Celtics) has had three players (Bill Russell, Bob Cousy and Bill Sharman) on the All-NBA Team.

Coaching changes
Offseason
Team	1957–58 coach	1958–59 coach
Minneapolis Lakers	George Mikan	John Kundla
New York Knicks	Vince Boryla	Andrew Levane
Philadelphia Warriors	George Senesky	Al Cervi
In-season
Team	Outgoing coach	Incoming coach
Cincinnati Royals	Bobby Wanzer	Tom Marshall
St. Louis Hawks	Andy Phillip	Ed Macauley

== Final standings ==
=== Eastern Division ===
Eastern Division	W	L	PCT	GB	Home	Road	Neutral	Div
x-Boston Celtics	52	20	.722	–	26–4	13–15	13–1	23–13
x-New York Knicks	40	32	.556	12	21–9	15–15	4–8	19–17
x-Syracuse Nationals	35	37	.486	17	17–9	7–24	8–7	14–22
Philadelphia Warriors	32	40	.444	20	17–9	7–24	8–7	14–22

=== Western Division ===
Western Division	W	L	PCT	GB	Home	Road	Neutral	Div
x-St. Louis Hawks	49	23	.681	–	28–3	14–15	7–5	27–9
x-Minneapolis Lakers	33	39	.458	16	15–7	9–17	9–15	18–18
x-Detroit Pistons	28	44	.389	21	13–17	8–20	7–7	17–19
Cincinnati Royals	19	53	.264	30	9–19	2–25	8–9	10–26

x – clinched playoff spot

== Playoffs ==
Division Semifinals
E3	Syracuse	2
E2	New York	0
W3	Detroit	1
W2	Minneapolis	2

Division Finals
Eastern Division
E1	Boston*	4
E3	Syracuse	3
Western Division
W1	St. Louis*	2
W2	Minneapolis	4

NBA Finals
E1	Boston*	4
W2	Minneapolis	0

- * Division winner
- Bold Series winner
- Italic Team with home-court advantage in NBA Finals

== Statistics leaders ==
Category	Player	Team	Stat
Points	Bob Pettit	St. Louis Hawks	2,105
Rebounds	Bill Russell	Boston Celtics	1,612
Assists	Bob Cousy	Boston Celtics	557
FG%	Kenny Sears	New York Knicks	.490
FT%	Bill Sharman	Boston Celtics	.932

Note: Prior to the 1969–70 season, league leaders in points, rebounds, and assists were determined by totals rather than averages.

== NBA awards ==
- Most Valuable Player: Bob Pettit, St. Louis Hawks
- Rookie of the Year: Elgin Baylor, Minneapolis Lakers
- All-NBA First Team:
  - F – Elgin Baylor, Minneapolis Lakers
  - F – Bob Pettit, St. Louis Hawks
  - C – Bill Russell, Boston Celtics
  - G – Bob Cousy, Boston Celtics
  - G – Bill Sharman, Boston Celtics
- All-NBA Second Team:
  - F – Paul Arizin, Philadelphia Warriors
  - F – Cliff Hagan, St. Louis Hawks
  - C – Dolph Schayes, Syracuse Nationals
  - G – Richie Guerin, New York Knicks
  - G – Slater Martin, St. Louis Hawks

== See also ==
- List of NBA regular season records
