= 1959 NBA Finals =

1959 basketball championship series

| Team | Coach | Wins |
|---|---|---|
| Boston Celtics | Red Auerbach | 4 |
| Minneapolis Lakers | John Kundla | 0 |
- Dates: April 4–9
- Hall of Famers: Celtics: Bob Cousy (1971); Bill Russell (1975); Bill Sharman (1976, player/2004, coach); Tom Heinsohn (1986, player/2015, coach); Frank Ramsey (1982); Sam Jones (1984); K. C. Jones (1989); Lakers: Vern Mikkelsen (1995); Elgin Baylor (1977); Coaches: Red Auerbach (1969); John Kundla (1995)
- Eastern finals: Celtics defeated Nationals, 4–3
- Western finals: Lakers defeated Hawks, 4–2

The 1959 NBA World Championship Series was the championship series of the 1958–59 National Basketball Association season, and was the conclusion of the 1959 NBA playoffs. The best-of-seven series was played between the Western Division champion Minneapolis Lakers and the Eastern Division champion Boston Celtics. It was Boston's third trip to the NBA Finals and Minneapolis's sixth. This was the first Finals meeting in the history of the Celtics-Lakers rivalry, marking the start of the storied rivalry between the two franchises.

The Celtics swept the Lakers 4–0, the first ever NBA Finals sweep. This was the start of the streak of the Celtics' eight consecutive championships, from 1959 to 1966. To date, this is the most recent time that an NBA team from the Minneapolis-St. Paul area appeared in an NBA Finals, as well as the second time in three years (1957) a team with a losing record made the NBA Finals. This would be the most recent occurrence of a team with a losing record making the NBA Finals until 1981.

== Series summary ==
| Game | Date | Home team | Result | Road team |
|---|---|---|---|---|
| Game 1 | April 4 | Boston Celtics | 118–115 (1–0) | Minneapolis Lakers |
| Game 2 | April 5 | Boston Celtics | 128–108 (2–0) | Minneapolis Lakers |
| Game 3 | April 7 | Minneapolis Lakers | 110–123 (0–3) | Boston Celtics |
| Game 4 | April 9 | Minneapolis Lakers | 113–118 (0–4) | Boston Celtics |

Celtics win series 4–0

== Team rosters ==
=== Boston Celtics ===
1958–59 Boston Celtics roster
Players

| Pos. | No. | Player | Height | Weight | DOB | From |
|---|---|---|---|---|---|---|
| PF | 17 | Gene Conley | 6 ft 8 in (2.03 m) | 225 lb (102 kg) | 1930–11–10 | Washington State |
| PG | 14 | Bob Cousy | 6 ft 1 in (1.85 m) | 175 lb (79 kg) | 1928-08-09 | Holy Cross |
| PF | 15 | Tom Heinsohn | 6 ft 7 in (2.01 m) | 218 lb (99 kg) | 1934–08–26 | Holy Cross |
| PG | 25, 27 | K.C. Jones | 6 ft 1 in (1.85 m) | 200 lb (91 kg) | 1932–05–25 | San Francisco |
| SG | 24 | Sam Jones | 6 ft 4 in (1.93 m) | 198 lb (90 kg) | 1933-06-24 | North Carolina Central |
| SF | 18 | Jim Loscutoff | 6 ft 5 in (1.96 m) | 220 lb (100 kg) | 1930–02–04 | Oregon |
| SG | 23 | Frank Ramsey | 6 ft 3 in (1.91 m) | 190 lb (86 kg) | 1931–07–13 | Kentucky |
| C | 6 | Bill Russell | 6 ft 10 in (2.08 m) | 215 lb (98 kg) | 1934–2–12 | San Francisco |
| SG | 21 | Bill Sharman | 6 ft 1 in (1.85 m) | 175 lb (79 kg) | 1926–05–25 | USC |
| PF | 16 | Bennie Swain | 6 ft 8 in (2.03 m) | 220 lb (100 kg) | 1933–12–16 | Texas Southern |
| SF | 20 | Lou Tsioropoulos | 6 ft 5 in (1.96 m) | 190 lb (86 kg) | 1930–08–31 | Kentucky |

Coaches
Head coach
- Red Auerbach

Legend
- (DP) Unsigned draft pick
- (FA) Free agent
- (S) Suspended
- Injured

Roster

=== Minneapolis Lakers ===
1958–59 Minneapolis Lakers roster
Players

| Pos. | No. | Player | Height | Weight | DOB | From |
|---|---|---|---|---|---|---|
| SF | 22 | Elgin Baylor | 6 ft 5 in (1.96 m) | 225 lb (102 kg) | 1934–09–16 | Seattle |
| PF | 12, 23 | Boo Ellis | 6 ft 5 in (1.96 m) | 185 lb (84 kg) | 1936-12-11 | Niagara |
| SG | 50 | Ed Fleming | 6 ft 3 in (1.91 m) | 189 lb (86 kg) | 1933–07–25 | Niagara |
| C | 14 | Larry Foust | 6 ft 9 in (2.06 m) | 215 lb (98 kg) | 1928–06–24 | La Salle |
| SG | 16 | Dick Garmaker | 6 ft 3 in (1.91 m) | 200 lb (91 kg) | 1932-10-29 | Minnesota |
| SF | 30 | Steve Hamilton | 6 ft 6 in (1.98 m) | 190 lb (86 kg) | 1934–11–30 | Morehead State |
| PG | 33 | Hot Rod Hundley | 6 ft 4 in (1.93 m) | 185 lb (84 kg) | 1934–10–26 | West Virginia |
| C | 32 | Jim Krebs | 6 ft 8 in (2.03 m) | 230 lb (104 kg) | 1935–09–08 | SMU |
| PG | 21 | Bobby Leonard | 6 ft 3 in (1.91 m) | 185 lb (84 kg) | 1932–09–17 | Indiana |
| PF | 19 | Vern Mikkelsen | 6 ft 7 in (2.01 m) | 230 lb (104 kg) | 1928–10–21 | Hamline |

Coaches
Head coach
- John Kundla

Legend
- (DP) Unsigned draft pick
- (FA) Free agent
- (S) Suspended
- Injured

Roster

== Boxscores ==
April 4

Boxscore

Minneapolis Lakers 115, Boston Celtics 118
Scoring by quarter: 29–29, 24–36, 31–19, 31–34
| Pts: Elgin Baylor 34; Rebs: Larry Foust 19 | Pts: Frank Ramsey 29; Rebs: Bill Russell 28 |
Boston leads series, 1–0

Boston Garden, Boston, Massachusetts
Attendance: 8,195

April 5

Boxscore

Minneapolis Lakers 108, Boston Celtics 128
Scoring by quarter: 17–32, 31–40, 37–28, 23–28
| Pts: Vern Mikkelsen 24; Rebs: Steve Hamilton 13 | Pts: Bill Sharman 28; Rebs: Bill Russell 30 |
Boston leads series, 2–0

Boston Garden, Boston, Massachusetts
Attendance: 11,082

April 7

Boxscore

Boston Celtics 123, Minneapolis Lakers 110
Scoring by quarter: 35–27, 34–26, 32–32, 22–25
| Pts: Tom Heinsohn 26; Rebs: Bill Russell 30 | Pts: Larry Foust 26; Rebs: Larry Foust 22 |
Boston leads series, 3–0

St. Paul Auditorium, Saint Paul, Minnesota
Attendance: 11,272

April 9

Boxscore

Boston Celtics 118, Minneapolis Lakers 113
Scoring by quarter: 34–34, 30–28, 24–25, 30–26
| Pts: Bill Sharman 29; Rebs: Bill Russell 30 | Pts: Elgin Baylor 30; Rebs: Elgin Baylor 14 |
Boston wins series, 4–0

Minneapolis Auditorium, Minneapolis, Minnesota
Attendance: 8,124

- Vern Mikkelsen played his last NBA game as the Celtics completed the sweep.
