= Steve Hamilton (sportsman, born 1934) =

American baseball and basketball player (1934–1997)

- Pitcher
- Born: November 30, 1934; Columbia, Kentucky, U.S.
- Died: December 2, 1997 (aged 63); Morehead, Kentucky, U.S.
- Batted: Left Threw: Left

MLB debut
- April 23, 1961, for the Cleveland Indians

Last MLB appearance
- August 16, 1972, for the Chicago Cubs

MLB statistics
- Win–loss record: 40–31
- Earned run average: 3.05
- Strikeouts: 531
- Stats at Baseball Reference

Teams
- Cleveland Indians (1961); Washington Senators (1962–1963); New York Yankees (1963–1970); Chicago White Sox (1970); San Francisco Giants (1971); Chicago Cubs (1972)
Basketball career
Personal information
Listed height	6 ft 6 in (1.98 m)
Listed weight	190 lb (86 kg)
Career information
High school	Charlestown (Charlestown, Indiana)
College	Morehead State (1954–1958)
NBA draft	1958: 2nd round, 8th overall pick
Drafted by	Minneapolis Lakers
Playing career	1958–1960
Position	Forward / center
Number	30
Career history
1958–1960	Minneapolis Lakers
Career NBA statistics
Points	368 (4.5 ppg)
Rebounds	278 (3.4 rpg)
Assists	43 (0.5 apg)
Stats at NBA.com
Stats at Basketball Reference

Steven Absher Hamilton (November 30, 1934 – December 2, 1997) was an American Major League Baseball (MLB) and National Basketball Association (NBA) player.

== Basketball career ==
=== College ===
Hamilton attended Morehead State University in Morehead, Kentucky, from 1954 to 1958, where he excelled in basketball. He scored 1,829 points (4th all-time) and established five MSU rebounding records—single-season average (20.1), average career (16.4), single game (38), single season (543), and career (1,675). He was an All-American in 1957, and a two-time All-Ohio Valley Conference First-Team selection.

=== NBA ===
From 1958 to 1960, Hamilton was a power forward/center for the Minneapolis Lakers. He played for the 1958–59 team that lost to the Boston Celtics during the 1959 NBA Finals. Over two seasons, he averaged 4.5 points per game, 3.4 rebounds per game, and 0.5 assists per game.

== Baseball career ==
=== Minors ===
Hamilton began pitching full time in the American League for the Cleveland Indians' farm system in 1958. A starter, he pitched four full years in the minor leagues, posting records of 15–14, 14–10, 13–9, and 10–12, and throwing between 172 and 210 innings pitched each season.

Early in the 1961 season, Hamilton pitched briefly for the major league franchise, logging three innings in two appearances for the Indians, after which he pitched the balance of the season at the top level of the minors, AAA.

=== Major league pitcher ===
Hamilton broke into the Major Leagues as a 26-year-old rookie in 1961. He was a lanky 6' 6" lefty, who took advantage of his immense NBA-sized wingspan to throw sidearm, creating a particularly difficult angle for left-handed batters. While an occasional starter, Hamilton was mostly a middle relief pitcher during his 12 MLB seasons – though he had a stint as the New York Yankees' closer during the 1968 season. His best won-loss record was 7–2 (.778% win percentage) with New York in 1964, followed by 8–3 (.727%) in 1966. Hamilton's lowest ERA was 1.39 in 1965, then 2.13 in 1968. In 1963, his first season with the Yankees, he struck out over one batter per inning (63 in 62.1).

In 421 career games (17 starts, 10 in 1962 alone), from 1961 to 1972 Hamilton had a 40–31 record with 42 saves and a 3.05 earned run average. He pitched one inning during the Yankees 1963 World Series loss to the Los Angeles Dodgers and two innings during the Yankees' 1964 World Series loss to the St. Louis Cardinals, including one save. Hamilton also pitched in the 1971 NLCS for the San Francisco Giants.

Hamilton's one complete game shutout was on August 5, 1966, against the Cleveland Indians, while pitching for the New York Yankees. He gave up five hits, walked one and struck out three. It was one of only three starts Hamilton had in the 1966 season. Late in his career, Hamilton threw what famously became known as "The Folly Floater", a high, slow eephus pitch. Other pitchers who have thrown a lob pitch include Rip Sewell and Dave LaRoche.

== Playing both sports ==
Hamilton pitched a full season in the minors in 1958 before he began his NBA career. In the late 1950s both the NBA and MLB seasons were much more compact, with shorter seasons (just 72 games in the NBA, and 154 in MLB), shorter preseasons, and shorter postseasons (much shorter in MLB's case, with only a single round seven-game championship series for each sport, compared to a best-of-3 followed by two rounds of best of 7 in the NBA).

Hamilton pitched all of the 1958 baseball season for the B-level minor league franchise of the big league Cleveland Indians. Its season ended in or before early September, well before the major league did (in order to allow top AAA-level minor league "call-ups" to be added to expanded big league rosters, that rose from 24 to 40 that month). Hamilton was not one of them.

The 1958–59 NBA season began on October 17. The 1958 Minneapolis Lakers were swept in the finals 0–4 by the Boston Celtics, with the last game of the series being played on April 8, 1959.

Hamilton played for the Single-A Cleveland minor league franchise in 1959, which also would have ended its season around or before September 1. The 1959 Minneapolis Lakers made the playoffs, but fell in the division finals, with the last game being played on March 25, 1960.

Hamilton pitched for Cleveland's Double-A minor league franchise in 1960. The 1960 Los Angeles Lakers fell 3–4 in the division finals, the last game of which was played on April 1, 1961. Hamilton made his major league debut with the Indians on April 23, 1961, pitched in two games, then spent the balance of his season at the AAA level.

By 1962 Hamilton was out of the NBA, and pitching regularly in the major leagues with the Washington Senators franchise.

== Personal ==
After his major league career ended, Hamilton was a Detroit Tigers coach in 1975 and was the athletic director at his alma mater, Morehead State University. Tommy John, who met Hamilton while both were in the Indians organization, recalled that "he had two prominent physical characteristics, other than his height: a protruding Adam's apple that bobbed as he spoke, and a Nellie Fox-sized wad of chewing tobacco in his cheek."

Hamilton was interviewed for Studs Terkel's bestselling book, Working: What People do all Day and How They Feel About What They Do.

Hamilton died of colon cancer at his home in Morehead, Kentucky, on December 2, 1997, and was buried in nearby Forest Lawn Garden of Memories.

== Honors ==
Hamilton is one of only two people to have played in both a World Series and an NBA finals. (The other is Gene Conley, who won both a World Series (in 1957 with the Milwaukee Braves) and an NBA finals (from 1959 to 1961 with the Boston Celtics).)

Hamilton is one of 13 athletes to have played in both the National Basketball Association and Major League Baseball. The thirteen are: Danny Ainge, Frank Baumholtz, Hank Biasatti, Gene Conley, Chuck Connors, Dave DeBusschere, Dick Groat, Hamilton, Mark Hendrickson, Cotton Nash, Ron Reed, Dick Ricketts and Howie Schultz.

Hamilton is the only athlete to compete in the MLB World Series as member of the New York Yankees in the 1963 season vs Dodgers and 1964 season vs Cardinals and competed in the NBA Finals as a member of the Minneapolis Lakers in 1959 season losing to the Boston Celtics plus competed twice in the NCAA Division 1 Men's Basketball Tournament.

== Career statistics ==
Legend
GP	Games played	GS	Games started	MPG	Minutes per game
FG%	Field goal percentage	3P%	3-point field goal percentage	FT%	Free throw percentage
RPG	Rebounds per game	APG	Assists per game	SPG	Steals per game
BPG	Blocks per game	PPG	Points per game	**Bold**	Career high

=== NBA ===
==== Regular season ====
Year	Team	GP	MPG	FG%	FT%	RPG	APG	PPG
1958–59	Minneapolis	**67**	12.6	.371	.679	3.3	**.5**	4.4
1959–60	Minneapolis	15	**16.5**	**.377**	**.783**	**3.9**	**.5**	**5.1**
Career		82	13.3	.372	.697	3.4	.5	4.5

==== Playoffs ====
Year	Team	GP	MPG	FG%	FT%	RPG	APG	PPG
1959	Minneapolis	10	8.7	.279	.800	3.5	.5	3.2

== See also ==
- List of NCAA Division I men's basketball players with 30 or more rebounds in a game
- List of NCAA Division I men's basketball career rebounding leaders

Preceded by Cot Deal	Detroit Tigers pitching coach 1975	Succeeded by Fred Gladding
