= Gene Shue =

American basketball player and coach (1931–2022)

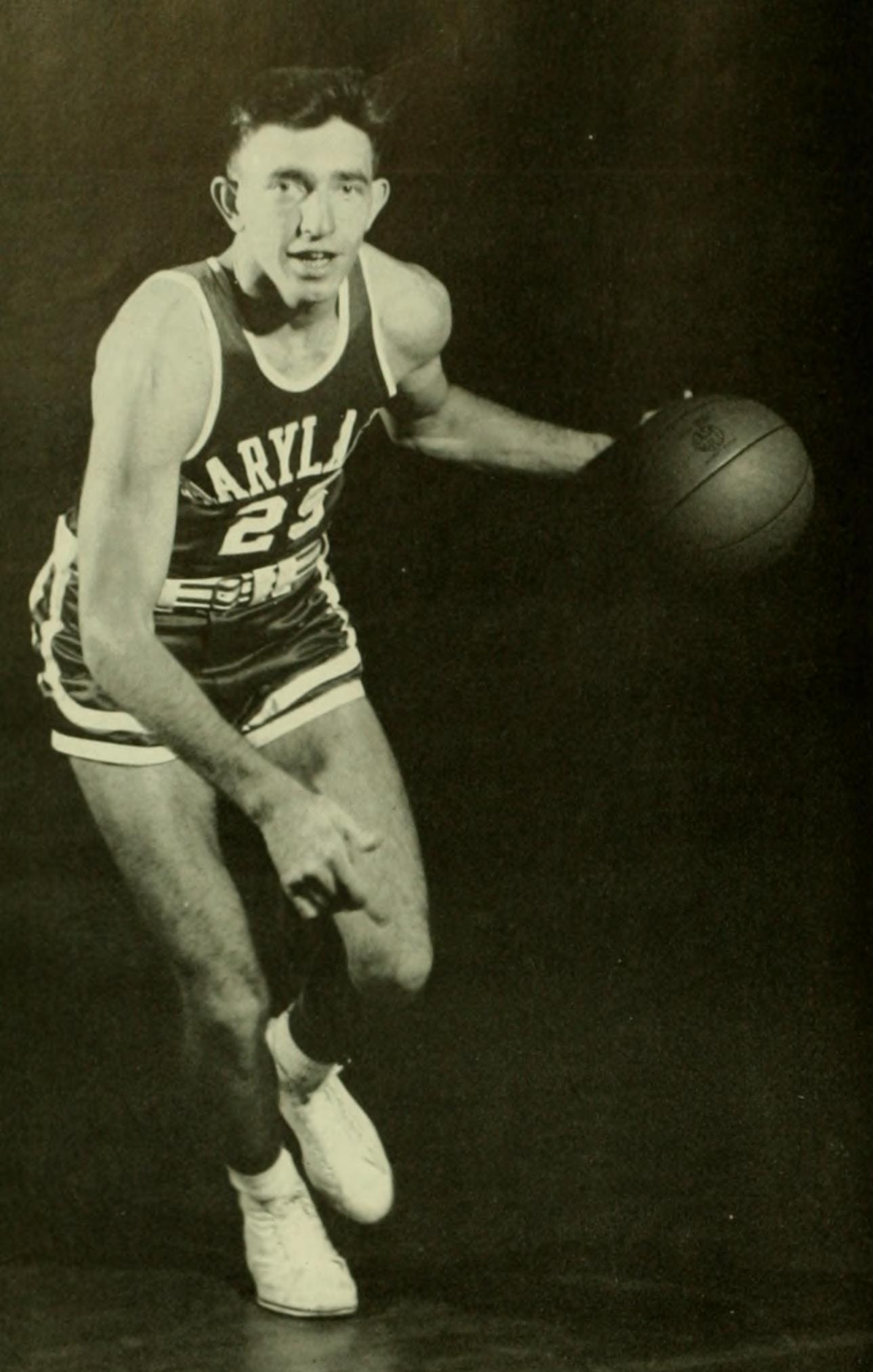
- Shue at Maryland in 1954

Personal information
- Born: December 18, 1931 Baltimore, Maryland, U.S.
- Died: April 3, 2022 (aged 90) Marina del Rey, California, U.S.
- Listed height: 6 ft 2 in (1.88 m)
- Listed weight: 170 lb (77 kg)

Career information
- High school: Towson Catholic (Towson, Maryland)
- College: Maryland (1951–1954)
- NBA draft: 1954: 1st round, 3rd overall pick
- Drafted by: Philadelphia Warriors
- Playing career: 1954–1964
- Position: Point guard / shooting guard
- Number: 4, 6, 7, 21, 12
- Coaching career: 1966–1989

Career history

Playing
- 1954: Philadelphia Warriors
- 1954–1956: New York Knicks
- 1956–1962: Fort Wayne / Detroit Pistons
- 1962–1963: New York Knicks
- 1963–1964: Baltimore Bullets

Coaching
- 1966–1973: Baltimore Bullets
- 1973–1977: Philadelphia 76ers
- 1978–1980: San Diego Clippers
- 1980–1986: Washington Bullets
- 1987–1989: Los Angeles Clippers

Career highlights
- 5× NBA All-Star (1958–1962); All-NBA First Team (1960); All-NBA Second Team (1961); First-team All-ACC (1954); As coach: 2× NBA Coach of the Year (1969, 1982); 2× NBA All-Star Game head coach (1969, 1977)

Career playing statistics
- Points: 10,068 (14.4 ppg)
- Rebounds: 2,855 (4.1 rpg)
- Assists: 2,608 (3.7 apg)
- Stats at NBA.com
- Stats at Basketball Reference

Career coaching record
- NBA: 784–861 (.477)
- Record at Basketball Reference

Eugene William Shue (December 18, 1931 – April 3, 2022) was an American professional basketball player and coach in the National Basketball Association (NBA). Shue was one of the top guards of the early days of the NBA and an influential figure in the development of basketball. He is credited with having invented the "spin move" while being an early harbinger of other plays and strategies. Shue was an NBA All-Star in five consecutive times from 1958 to 1962.

After his playing career, he became a long-serving coach for three franchises. With his first tenure with the Baltimore Bullets, Shue coached the team for seven seasons and won four division championships with five playoff berths, with one trip to the NBA Finals in 1971. He resigned at the end of the 1972-73 season and soon became coach of the Philadelphia 76ers, where he helped the team rise in victories to where they won 50 games and reached the NBA Finals in 1977, where they lost in a six-game series to Portland. After six games of the 1977-78 season, Shue was unceremoniously fired. Shue was the first coach of the newly relocated San Diego Clippers in 1978. His first season resulted in 43 wins, which ended up being the high-water mark for the franchise until 1992; Shue was fired after the second season.

Shue returned to coach the Bullets in 1980, reaching the post-season three times in six seasons but never winning more than 43 games before the Clippers (now in Los Angeles) hired him to coach in 1987, where he closed his tenure as a coach with 27 wins in 120 total games. While Shue had a total record of 784–861 as a head coach, he was twice awarded NBA Coach of the Year; he is one of just twelve coaches to win multiple Coach of the Year awards. Throughout his career as player, coach, and executive, Shue was "a specialist at taking over faltering teams".

== Early life ==
Shue was born on December 18, 1931, in Baltimore, Maryland. He grew up in the city's Govans neighborhood and attended Towson Catholic High School. His family lived on welfare and he did not own a basketball as a child. He grew up a fan of the Baltimore Bullets and Buddy Jeannette, recollecting in 1994:

When I was a kid growing up in Govans and Buddy was the leader of the Bullets, I was such a fan of his. Those were the early days of TV. We kids used to stand outside J.V. Stout's electronics store on York Road and watch through the window on little black-and-white TVs.

== College career ==
As a prospect in 1950, Shue was lightly recruited by University of Maryland's newly hired coach Bud Millikan. However, he wanted to play for the more-established programs at Loyola or Georgetown. After getting turned down by Loyola and getting wait listed by Georgetown after two underwhelming tryouts, Shue opted to instead play for Maryland. Shue did not receive a scholarship and instead worked odd jobs, including cleaning the basketball court (only receiving a scholarship his senior season). Joining a program with Coach Millikan that had losing records in eight of its last 10 seasons, Shue later remarked:

When Bud took over the program, there really was no program. Boxing was more important than basketball. We had a terrific boxing team at the time and they would feature the boxing match [as the featured event] if we had a doubleheader.

In his tenure with Maryland, Shue and Millikan led the school's team to new heights, including their first 20-plus win regular season (23 his senior year), their first appearance in national rankings (peaked at #13 in 1954), and entrance into the Atlantic Coast Conference. While at Maryland, Shue joined Delta Kappa Epsilon fraternity.

Shue left Maryland as its star player and their first high-profile NBA prospect. He broke all of the school scoring records and made the All-ACC team.

== Professional career ==
=== Philadelphia Warriors (1954) ===
Following his collegiate graduation, Shue was drafted third overall in the 1954 NBA draft by the Philadelphia Warriors on April 24, 1954.

=== New York Knicks (1954–1956) ===
On November 28, 1954, after just six games with the Warriors, Shue's player rights were sold to the New York Knicks, after notifying then-owner Eddie Gottlieb that his paycheck was $10 short ($110.15 in 2022).

=== Fort Wayne / Detroit Pistons (1956–1962) ===
After the 1955–56 season, on April 30, 1956, Shue was traded to the Fort Wayne Pistons for Ron Sobie. In 1956–57 season he played his first full season for the Pistons.

The franchise moved to Detroit the following season. Shue recalled the struggles during the opening game at the Detroit Olympia: "There were so many delays during the game because the floor was slippery from the ice below it, a problem that often happened. I didn’t like playing there because it was a large building with small crowds and you were always freezing your butt off."

In Detroit, Shue blossomed as a player and became popular enough for the P.A. to develop the catchphrase "Two for Shue". He started a streak of five All-Star Game appearances and five playoff berths.

In 1959–60 season, Shue recorded 22.8 pts/game (6th-most in the NBA) and 5.5 rebounds/game, leading the NBA in minutes (3,338) and finishing second in free throw percentage (.872) while earning All-NBA First Team honors. Eleven times during the season he played all 48 minutes. The following year, he averaged 4.3 rebounds/game, 6.8 assists/game (4th in the NBA) and 22.6 points/game (10th-most in the NBA). He also marked his highest field goal percentage (.421) and was named to the All-NBA Second Team. The 1961–62 season was his last one as star player; he averaged 19.0 pts/game and 5.8 assists/game (5th in the NBA).

=== New York Knicks (1962–1963) ===
On August 29, 1962, Shue was traded back to the New York Knicks for Darrall Imhoff and cash. On January 3, 1963, Shue was honored with a "Gene Shue Night" as a part of a promotion when the Knicks played the Baltimore Bullets, complete with him being the featured speaker at a luncheon sponsored by Baltimore’s Sports Reporters Association and receiving the ceremonial key to the city.

=== Baltimore Bullets (1963–1964) ===
On October 29, 1963, Shue was traded along with Paul Hogue to his hometown team, the Baltimore Bullets, for Bill McGill.

== Coaching career ==
As Shue moved on from playing, he began an NBA coaching career which would last over 22 years. He developed a reputation for helping bad teams become competitive. In 1986, the Los Angeles Times remarked, "Gene Shue has lost more games than any coach in NBA history, which is more of a testimony of Shue's coaching ability than a criticism. Anybody who can lose 768 games—he has won 757—and still be employed must be a good coach."

=== Baltimore Bullets (1966–1973) ===
Shue succeeded Buddy Jeannette as coach of the Baltimore Bullets on December 5, 1966. In his first coaching stint, the then 35-year-old led the Bullets and took over a 4–21 team mid-season leading them to a dismal 16–40 record in the 1966–67 season. Two seasons later, he led the franchise to the best record in the league, also the franchise's first winning season. He oversaw the team's improvement with three 50-plus-win seasons and an Eastern Conference Championship in 1970–71, which saw the Bullets play the defending world champion New York Knicks and win Game 7 on the road after having lost the previous three games played in New York; Shue once called the game among the most memorable he ever participated in. He guided the Bullets to the NBA Finals in 1971, but got swept by the Milwaukee Bucks led by Kareem Abdul-Jabbar and Oscar Robertson.

Shue's seven seasons in Baltimore were also noted for the Bullets' rivalry with the New York Knicks, in which both teams faced each other in the NBA playoffs for five straight years from 1969 to 1973. The Bullets lost to the Knicks four times in 1969 (0–4), 1970 (3–4), 1972 (2–4) and 1973 (1–4), winning only in 1971 (4–3).

Shue announced his resignation on June 8, 1973. He was not comfortable with the franchise's move to the Washington, D.C. suburbs beginning with the 1973–74 campaign. He explained, "Living and coaching in Baltimore was a beautiful situation. Now it is just not the same. They think I am Baltimore‐oriented and I am. They are looking for somebody to fit better into the Washington scene." He was replaced by K. C. Jones ten days later on June 18.

=== Philadelphia 76ers (1973–1977) ===
On June 15, 1973, a week after his departure from the Bullets, Shue signed a two‐year contract to succeed Kevin Loughery as head coach of the Philadelphia 76ers. He inherited a team whose 73 losses in the previous season is an NBA record. Under his leadership, the team increased their total from 25 games, then 34, then 46, and 50 with an Eastern Conference Championship. For the 76ers' 50-win 1976–77 season, Shue led a talented team with raised expectations, of whom Turquoise Erving (wife of Julius Erving) lamented in March 1977, "I feel we have the talent to win, but I don't think they're playing much like a team. No one here respects Shue. How many guys want to win one for Shue? Not one. And sometimes not even for themselves." Julius Erving once replied to the words as such: “Those were her words. Our team had a lot of obstacles that season. That was just one more.” Although reaching the Finals, they eventually lost to the Bill Walton–led Portland Trail Blazers in the NBA Finals, a devastating loss as Shue had spent much of the season dealing with in-fighting among the team's many stars. Shue was fired six games into the following season on November 4, 1977, having clashed with new owner Fitz Dixon despite raising the expectations to a championship. The team went as far as start a "We Owe You One" advertising campaign in reaction to the loss; the Sixers proceeded to not win a title until 1983. Shue was succeeded by Billy Cunningham (the 76ers eventually won a championship, albeit in 1983).

=== San Diego Clippers (1978–1980) ===
The next season, Shue joined the newly relocated San Diego Clippers and surprised the league with a 43–39 record and a near-playoff berth. He was fired the next season after an 11-game losing streak.

=== Washington Bullets (1980–1986) ===
Shue finally agreed to head coach the Washington Bullets when he signed a three-year contract to succeed Dick Motta on May 27, 1980. On November 14, 1983, Shue participated in his 2,000th game in the NBA. He coached in Washington for six seasons. His combined tenure of 522 wins is still the most in franchise history.

=== Los Angeles Clippers (1987–1989) ===
Shue's final head coaching assignment began on May 21, 1987, when he signed a three-year contract to return to the Clippers, which had relocated to Los Angeles three years earlier. He succeeded Don Chaney and inherited a Clippers team which had an NBA-worst 12–70 record in an injury-riddled 1986–87 and had failed to qualify for the playoffs for eleven consecutive seasons. With the Clippers beginning 1988–89 at 10–28 and in the midst of an eleven-game losing streak, Shue was fired on January 19, 1989, and assistant Don Casey was promoted to replace him. The Charlotte Hornets and Miami Heat, that season's expansion entries, both earned their first-ever victories at the expense of the Clippers which had the same win total as the former at the time of the coaching change. Shue's record in 1 1/2 years in Los Angeles was 27–93.

Shue finished his coaching career with a regular-season record of 784–861 while going 30–47 in the playoffs. His 784 wins are the 16th-most in NBA history and his 861 losses are the sixth-most in NBA history. He won NBA Coach of the Year in 1968 and 1981, and was one of only eleven league coaches to win the award in multiple seasons at the time of his death. He was the Eastern Conference Coach for two All-Star Games, in 1969 and 1977.

== Broadcasting career ==
After his final coaching position, Shue opted to move to California to become vice president of a mortgage business and work for a bank, while also serving as an analyst for ESPN on Continental Basketball Association games.

== Executive career ==
Shue was soon chosen as the General Manager for the 76ers. He was the target of Charles Barkley, who called him "a clown" as part of Barkley's effort to force a trade, and rumored tampering from executives from other teams.

== Legacy ==
=== As a player ===
Shue's dynamic guard play was influential for the newly formed NBA. He was known as a "gunner" who also played superb defense. His flair for dribbling and weaving was not the norm of the time, but would later become so for point guards. He had an ability to drive to the basket and use acrobatics to score or pass. His twisting layup wowed competitors, Elgin Baylor describing it as "tricky". He was one of the few players of his time to have a jump shot instead of a set shot (a habit from his grammar school's low ceiling), and to emphasize transitional offense. He invented the "spin move", the 360-degree spin with the ball switching hands. An advocate for skill-based play, he once posited that "a basketball team composed of little men up to 6 feet 5 inches could beat a team of tall men 6 feet 5 inches and over."

=== As a coach ===
Throughout his coaching career, Shue was known for his mix of fundamental basketball and unconventional strategies, many of which went against the norms of the time, but were sometimes adopted in future generations. His playbooks were both celebrated for their innovation and maligned for their heftiness. In 1988, Gerald Henderson declared, "Gene Shue's teams always control the tempo." NBA.com stated that Shue was one of the only coaches that embraced set plays for the then-controversial three-point shots when the line was first introduced, stating that Shue "gave the shot the green light and red carpet." At times, he had his team's center bring up the ball. George McGinnis in describing the merits of Shue's coaching philosophy, said, "He has a lot of plays that use my individual talent and a lot of plays for the team." Earl Monroe noted Shue's ability to get star players, like Monroe himself, to adapt their flashy skills to sound, fundamental team play (noting the perceived racial segregation in styles of play of the time). Spencer Haywood described Shue's ability to instill confidence "My guy was Gene Shue, and still is Gene Shue, who had the faith in me to say, "Take this team, and let's go." Bill Walton wrote in his autobiography that Shue "was awesome, always so positive, upbeat, imaginative, and extremely creative."

In 1980, Sports Illustrated suggested that Shue "might be the reigning expert on the rehabilitation of players, judging from his penchant for taking in the league's rejects and wayward souls." In 2009, Fox Sports listed him as one of ten great players who became great coaches, noting that Shue "specialized in improving the fortunes of bad ball clubs, which is the only reason why he lost so many games." Although his lifelong tendency to seek out challenging situations to turn around resulted in fewer wins, trophies, and accolades as both a player and a coach; in 1987, he remarked, "I think when you come into any losing situation, the first thing you have to bring with you is a positive attitude, one that your players can begin to believe in. Not that I ignore problems. I'm both optimistic and realistic. I have always been honest. I don't try to kid people." In 1989, the Los Angeles Times stated, "Gene Shue has proven to be one of the best coaches the NBA has ever had."

=== Post-career honors ===
Shue was inducted into University of Maryland's Hall of Fame in 1991. He was first on a ballot as a coach for the Naismith Basketball Hall of Fame in 1994, but was not elected. He was nominated again the following year but again the bid was an unsuccessful one. He was re-introduced in the Contributor category, where he was nominated, but not a finalist, in 2011, 2012, 2013 and 2024.

Shue's basketball career included over 40 years in the NBA, although split as player, coach, and executive. Bleacher Report listed him first on their list of coaches not in the Hall of Fame (but factored in his playing career).

== Personal life ==
Shue married twice, both ending in divorce. His first wife was Dottie Shue, the marriage resulting in 3 children: Susan Shue, Linda Shue and Gregory Shue. After his divorce to Dottie, he was married to Sandy Shue. In 1985, when asked about the effect of basketball on home life, Sandy Shue remarked, "People think he's got the most violent temper. They say, 'He must be an absolute bear to live with.' When we first began dating I really didn't like it. If he lost a basketball game he wouldn't speak to anyone, even me. Now he pretends like things are okay, but he still stays awake all night."

Shue was the godfather of Danny Ferry (the son of Bob Ferry, whom he played alongside and coached), who would similarly become an NBA player and executive.

Shue was in a domestic partnership with Patti Amis Massey from 2009 until the time of his death. They lived together in Marina Del Rey, California. Shue died on April 3, 2022, at his home in Marina Del Rey, aged 90. He had suffered from melanoma prior to his death.

== NBA career statistics ==
Legend
GP	Games played	GS	Games started	MPG	Minutes per game
FG%	Field goal percentage	3P%	3-point field goal percentage	FT%	Free throw percentage
RPG	Rebounds per game	APG	Assists per game	SPG	Steals per game
BPG	Blocks per game	PPG	Points per game	**Bold**	Career high

=== Regular season ===
Year	Team	GP	MPG	FG%	FT%	RPG	APG	PPG
1954–55	Philadelphia	6	10.8	.200	.833	1.7	1.8	1.8
1954–55	New York	56	15.8	.354	.750	2.6	1.4	4.4
1955–56	New York	72	24.3	.384	.764	2.9	2.5	9.2
1956–57	Fort Wayne	72	34.3	.385	.763	**5.8**	3.3	10.9
1957–58	Detroit	63	37.0	.384	.844	5.3	2.7	15.6
1958–59	Detroit	72	38.1	.388	.803	4.7	3.2	17.6
1959–60	Detroit	75	**44.5**	.413	**.872**	5.5	3.9	**22.8**
1960–61	Detroit	78	43.1	**.421**	.856	4.3	**6.8**	22.6
1961–62	Detroit	**80**	39.3	.408	.810	4.7	5.8	19.0
1962–63	New York	78	29.3	.396	.689	2.4	3.3	11.7
1963–64	Baltimore	47	20.5	.293	.590	2.0	3.2	4.2
Career		699	33.4	.396	.806	4.1	3.7	14.4
All-Star		5	26.0	.569	.667	4.0	3.8	13.2

=== Playoffs ===
Year	Team	GP	MPG	FG%	FT%	RPG	APG	PPG
1955	New York	3	16.3	.471	.857	4.0	1.3	7.3
1957	Fort Wayne	2	39.5	**.519**	**1.000**	3.5	4.0	16.0
1958	Detroit	7	40.1	.366	.930	**6.6**	4.7	18.6
1959	Detroit	3	39.3	.467	.818	4.7	3.3	**27.7**
1960	Detroit	2	**44.5**	.395	.900	6.0	3.0	24.0
1961	Detroit	5	37.2	.486	.793	2.4	4.4	18.6
1962	Detroit	**10**	36.9	.411	.771	3.0	**4.9**	16.1
Career		32	36.6	.424	.842	4.2	4.1	17.8

== Head coaching record ==
Legend
Regular season	G	Games coached	W	Games won	L	Games lost	W–L %	Win–loss %
Playoffs	PG	Playoff games	PW	Playoff wins	PL	Playoff losses	PW–L %	Playoff win–loss %

Team	Year	G	W	L	W–L%	Finish	PG	PW	PL	PW–L%	Result
Baltimore	1966–67	56	16	40	.286	5th in Eastern	—	—	—	—	—
Baltimore	1967–68	82	36	46	.439	6th in Eastern	—	—	—	—	—
Baltimore	1968–69	82	57	25	.695	1st in Eastern	4	0	4	.000	Lost in Conf. Semifinals
Baltimore	1969–70	82	50	32	.610	3rd in Eastern	7	3	4	.429	Lost in Conf. Semifinals
Baltimore	1970–71	82	42	40	.512	1st in Central	18	8	10	.444	Lost in NBA Finals
Baltimore	1971–72	82	38	44	.463	1st in Central	6	2	4	.333	Lost in Conf. Semifinals
Baltimore	1972–73	82	52	30	.634	1st in Central	5	1	4	.200	Lost in Conf. Semifinals
Philadelphia	1973–74	82	25	57	.321	4th in Atlantic	—	—	—	—	—
Philadelphia	1974–75	82	34	48	.415	4th in Atlantic	—	—	—	—	—
Philadelphia	1975–76	82	46	36	.561	2nd in Atlantic	3	1	2	.333	Lost in First Round
Philadelphia	1976–77	82	50	32	.610	1st in Atlantic	19	10	9	.526	Lost in NBA Finals
Philadelphia	1977–78	6	2	4	.333	(fired)	—	—	—	—	—
San Diego	1978–79	82	43	39	.524	5th in Pacific	—	—	—	—	—
San Diego	1979–80	82	35	47	.427	5th in Pacific	—	—	—	—	—
Washington	1980–81	82	39	43	.476	4th in Atlantic	—	—	—	—	—
Washington	1981–82	82	43	39	.524	4th in Atlantic	7	3	4	.429	Lost in Conf. Semifinals
Washington	1982–83	82	42	40	.512	5th in Atlantic	—	—	—	—	—
Washington	1983–84	82	35	47	.427	5th in Atlantic	4	1	3	.250	Lost in First Round
Washington	1984–85	82	40	42	.488	4th in Atlantic	4	1	3	.250	Lost in First Round
Washington	1985–86	69	32	37	.464	(fired)	—	—	—	—	—
Los Angeles	1987–88	82	17	65	.207	6th in Pacific	—	—	—	—	—
Los Angeles	1988–89	38	10	28	.263	(fired)	—	—	—	—	—
Career		1,645	784	861	.477		77	30	47	.390	
