= 1958–59 Detroit Pistons season =

NBA team season

- Head coach: Red Rocha
- General manager: Nick Kerbawy
- Owner: Fred Zollner
- Arena: Detroit Olympia

Results
- Record: 28–44 (.389)
- Place: Division: 3rd (Western)
- Playoff finish: West Division Semifinals (eliminated 1–2)
- Stats at Basketball Reference

The 1958–59 Detroit Pistons season was the Detroit Pistons' 11th season in the NBA and second season in the city of Detroit. The team played at Olympia Stadium in Detroit.

The team finished with a 28-44 (.389) record, third in the Western Division, but advanced to the playoffs, dropping the Western Conference semi-final 2–1 to the Minneapolis Lakers. The team was led guard Gene Shue (17.6 ppg, NBA All-Star) and center Walter Dukes (13.0 ppg, 13.3 rpg). The Pistons traded away NBA All-Star George Yardley to the Syracuse Nationals during the season in a trade that netted Ed Conlin.

== Regular season ==
=== Season standings ===
| Western Division | W | L | PCT | GB | Home | Road | Neutral | Div |
|---|---|---|---|---|---|---|---|---|
| x-St. Louis Hawks | 49 | 23 | .681 | – | 28–3 | 14–15 | 7–5 | 27–9 |
| x-Minneapolis Lakers | 33 | 39 | .458 | 16 | 15–7 | 9–17 | 9–15 | 18–18 |
| x-Detroit Pistons | 28 | 44 | .389 | 21 | 13–17 | 8–20 | 7–7 | 17–19 |
| Cincinnati Royals | 19 | 53 | .264 | 30 | 9–19 | 2–25 | 8–9 | 10–26 |

x – clinched playoff spot

=== Game log ===
1958–59 Game log
| # | Date | Opponent | Score | High points | Record |
| 1 | October 19 | @ Syracuse | L 94–103 | Gene Shue (18) | 0–1 |
| 2 | October 23 | @ St. Louis | L 103–104 | George Yardley (28) | 0–2 |
| 3 | October 25 | St. Louis | W 117–112 | Phil Jordon (33) | 1–2 |
| 4 | October 26 | @ Minneapolis | L 100–108 | George Yardley (36) | 1–3 |
| 5 | October 31 | Cincinnati | W 120–113 | Phil Jordon (31) | 2–3 |
| 6 | November 1 | @ Boston | L 98–112 | George Yardley (17) | 2–4 |
| 7 | November 2 | @ Philadelphia | W 107–91 | George Yardley (33) | 3–4 |
| 8 | November 7 | New York | L 101–115 | Chuck Noble (23) | 3–5 |
| 9 | November 9 | Boston | W 136–133 | Gene Shue (45) | 4–5 |
| 10 | November 13 | vs. Minneapolis | W 119–110 | Shue, Yardley (32) | 5–5 |
| 11 | November 14 | Syracuse | L 109–111 | George Yardley (25) | 5–6 |
| 12 | November 15 | @ St. Louis | L 91–102 | Phil Jordon (20) | 5–7 |
| 13 | November 18 | vs. Boston | L 102–115 | Phil Jordon (18) | 5–8 |
| 14 | November 22 | Cincinnati | W 103–86 | George Yardley (24) | 6–8 |
| 15 | November 23 | @ Minneapolis | W 124–109 | George Yardley (34) | 7–8 |
| 16 | November 25 | Minneapolis | L 90–98 | George Yardley (31) | 7–9 |
| 17 | November 26 | @ Cincinnati | W 112–95 | Phil Jordon (24) | 8–9 |
| 18 | November 28 | Syracuse | W 101–93 | Chuck Noble (20) | 9–9 |
| 19 | November 29 | @ Boston | L 96–110 | Farley, McMillon, Shue (14) | 9–10 |
| 20 | December 2 | Philadelphia | W 95–91 | George Yardley (37) | 10–10 |
| 21 | December 5 | New York | L 108–110 | George Yardley (24) | 10–11 |
| 22 | December 6 | @ New York | W 99–92 | Chuck Noble (20) | 11–11 |
| 23 | December 10 | vs. St. Louis | W 89–82 | Dukes, Jordon (12) | 12–11 |
| 24 | December 11 | vs. St. Louis | W 107–101 | George Yardley (37) | 13–11 |
| 25 | December 12 | Philadelphia | W 97–95 | Phil Jordon (32) | 14–11 |
| 26 | December 14 | Syracuse | L 95–101 | Dick McGuire (22) | 14–12 |
| 27 | December 17 | Boston | L 95–102 | George Yardley (33) | 14–13 |
| 28 | December 18 | @ Minneapolis | L 104–113 | George Yardley (27) | 14–14 |
| 29 | December 20 | St. Louis | L 104–111 | Gene Shue (20) | 14–15 |
| 30 | December 25 | vs. Minneapolis | W 98–97 (OT) | Gene Shue (17) | 15–15 |
| 31 | December 26 | Cincinnati | W 131–91 | George Yardley (28) | 16–15 |
| 32 | December 30 | @ New York | L 90–93 | George Yardley (21) | 16–16 |
| 33 | January 2 | vs. Cincinnati | L 104–111 | George Yardley (30) | 16–17 |
| 34 | January 3 | New York | L 102–106 | George Yardley (16) | 16–18 |
| 35 | January 4 | @ Syracuse | L 94–118 | Phil Jordon (24) | 16–19 |
| 36 | January 6 | @ Philadelphia | W 107–105 | George Yardley (27) | 17–19 |
| 37 | January 9 | Boston | L 90–103 | George Yardley (21) | 17–20 |
| 38 | January 10 | @ Cincinnati | W 101–69 | Gene Shue (24) | 18–20 |
| 39 | January 11 | @ St. Louis | L 100–111 | McGuire, Shue (14) | 18–21 |
| 40 | January 13 | vs. Cincinnati | W 112–92 | Phil Jordon (24) | 19–21 |
| 41 | January 14 | St. Louis | L 108–114 | Walter Dukes (25) | 19–22 |
| 42 | January 17 | Philadelphia | L 104–106 | Walter Dukes (23) | 19–23 |
| 43 | January 18 | @ Cincinnati | L 88–107 | Walter Dukes (26) | 19–24 |
| 44 | January 21 | @ Philadelphia | L 105–112 | George Yardley (33) | 19–25 |
| 45 | January 24 | @ New York | L 118–122 (OT) | Walter Dukes (24) | 19–26 |
| 46 | January 25 | @ Boston | L 118–119 (OT) | Gene Shue (29) | 19–27 |
| 47 | January 26 | vs. Philadelphia | L 98–102 | Phil Jordon (23) | 19–28 |
| 48 | January 27 | Syracuse | L 107–121 | Phil Jordon (23) | 19–29 |
| 49 | January 30 | vs. Minneapolis | L 86–88 | Gene Shue (20) | 19–30 |
| 50 | January 31 | Cincinnati | W 103–88 | Gene Shue (27) | 20–30 |
| 51 | February 1 | @ St. Louis | L 96–130 | Chuck Noble (18) | 20–31 |
| 52 | February 4 | Philadelphia | W 119–117 (2OT) | Walter Dukes (26) | 21–31 |
| 53 | February 6 | vs. Syracuse | L 103–122 | Joe Holup (21) | 21–32 |
| 54 | February 8 | Minneapolis | L 103–115 | Earl Lloyd (22) | 21–33 |
| 55 | February 9 | vs. Cincinnati | W 122–97 | Phil Jordon (20) | 22–33 |
| 56 | February 11 | @ Syracuse | W 118–114 (OT) | Phil Jordon (30) | 23–33 |
| 57 | February 13 | New York | W 96–90 | Phil Jordon (19) | 24–33 |
| 58 | February 15 | @ Boston | L 94–120 | Gene Shue (15) | 24–34 |
| 59 | February 17 | Minneapolis | L 90–97 | Earl Lloyd (20) | 24–35 |
| 60 | February 18 | @ Minneapolis | L 95–105 | Gene Shue (22) | 24–36 |
| 61 | February 20 | Boston | L 106–111 (OT) | Gene Shue (24) | 24–37 |
| 62 | February 21 | vs. New York | W 114–101 | Gene Shue (26) | 25–37 |
| 63 | February 22 | @ Syracuse | L 108–139 | Gene Shue (21) | 25–38 |
| 64 | February 25 | St. Louis | L 100–104 | Phil Jordon (20) | 25–39 |
| 65 | February 26 | vs. Cincinnati | L 101–106 | Gene Shue (16) | 25–40 |
| 66 | March 1 | Cincinnati | W 117–101 | Gene Shue (31) | 26–40 |
| 67 | March 3 | vs. Philadelphia | L 107–116 | Gene Shue (20) | 26–41 |
| 68 | March 4 | St. Louis | W 127–97 | Shellie McMillon (23) | 27–41 |
| 69 | March 6 | Minneapolis | L 98–99 | Conlin, Dukes (17) | 27–42 |
| 70 | March 7 | @ St. Louis | L 128–137 | Gene Shue (27) | 27–43 |
| 71 | March 8 | @ New York | L 120–127 | Phil Jordon (19) | 27–44 |
| 72 | March 11 | @ Minneapolis | W 123–118 | Phil Jordon (21) | 28–44 |

== Playoffs ==
1959 playoff game log
Division Semifinals: 1–2 (home: 1–0; road: 0–2)

| Game | Date | Team | Score | High points | Location | Series |
|---|---|---|---|---|---|---|
| 1 | March 14 | @ Minneapolis | L 89–92 | Phil Jordon (22) | Minneapolis Auditorium | 0–1 |
| 2 | March 15 | Minneapolis | W 117–103 | Gene Shue (32) | Detroit Olympia | 1–1 |
| 3 | March 18 | @ Minneapolis | L 102–129 | Gene Shue (31) | Minneapolis Auditorium | 1–2 |

1959 schedule
