= 1959 NBA playoffs =

Postseason tournament

Tournament details
- Dates: March 13 – April 9, 1959
- Season: 1958–59
- Teams: 6

Final positions
- Champions: Boston Celtics (2nd title)
- Runner-up: Minneapolis Lakers
- Semifinalists: St. Louis Hawks; Syracuse Nationals

The 1959 NBA playoffs was the postseason tournament of the National Basketball Association's 1958–59 season. The tournament concluded with the Eastern Division champion Boston Celtics defeating the Western Division champion Minneapolis Lakers 4 games to 0 in the NBA Finals. It was the Celtics' second NBA championship.

This was the first NBA Finals matchup between the Lakers and Celtics; as of 2020, they have met in the Finals 12 times. Boston won the first eight NBA Finals series of the rivalry, spanning 3 decades – the 1950s, 1960s and 1980s – before the Lakers finally defeated Boston for the title in 1985 and again in 1987. Boston again topped the Lakers in 2008, but the Lakers gained revenge in 2010. This was the only Celtics/Lakers NBA Finals series that took place while the Lakers were based in Minneapolis, Minnesota. They remained in Minneapolis one more year before moving to their current home of Los Angeles, California.

== Bracket ==
Division Semifinals
E3	Syracuse	2
E2	New York	0
W3	Detroit	1
W2	Minneapolis	2

Division Finals
Eastern Division
E1	Boston*	4
E3	Syracuse	3
Western Division
W1	St. Louis*	2
W2	Minneapolis	4

NBA Finals
E1	Boston*	4
W2	Minneapolis	0

- * Division winner
- Bold Series winner
- Italic Team with home-court advantage in NBA Finals

== Division Semifinals ==
=== Eastern Division Semifinals ===
==== (2) New York Knicks vs. (3) Syracuse Nationals ====
March 13

Boxscore

Syracuse Nationals 129, New York Knicks 123
Scoring by quarter: 36–29, 31–27, 40–38, 22–29
Pts: Dolph Schayes 35	Pts: Richie Guerin 24
Syracuse leads series, 1–0

Madison Square Garden III, Manhattan, New York

March 15

Boxscore

New York Knicks 115, Syracuse Nationals 131
Scoring by quarter: 27–26, 25–37, 25–29, 38–39
Pts: Willie Naulls 26	Pts: Red Kerr 34
Syracuse wins series, 2–0

Onondaga War Memorial, Syracuse, New York

This was the fifth playoff meeting between these two teams, with both teams splitting the first four meetings.

Previous playoff series
Tied 2–2 in all-time playoff series

1950

New York Knicks 1, Syracuse Nationals 2

1950 Eastern Division Finals

1951

New York Knicks 3, Syracuse Nationals 2

1951 Eastern Division Finals

1952

New York Knicks 3, Syracuse Nationals 1

1952 Eastern Division Finals

1954

New York Knicks 0, Syracuse Nationals 2

1954 Eastern Division Round Robin Semifinals

=== Western Division Semifinals ===
==== (2) Minneapolis Lakers vs. (3) Detroit Pistons ====
March 14

Boxscore

Detroit Pistons 89, Minneapolis Lakers 92
Scoring by quarter: 23–26, 15–19, 29–23, 22–24
Pts: Phil Jordon 22	Pts: Larry Foust 17
Minneapolis leads series, 1–0

Minneapolis Auditorium, Minneapolis, Minnesota

March 15

Boxscore

Minneapolis Lakers 103, Detroit Pistons 117
Scoring by quarter: 21–32, 19–20, 31–40, 32–25
Pts: Elgin Baylor 26	Pts: Gene Shue 32
Series tied, 1–1

Detroit Olympia, Detroit, Michigan

March 18

Boxscore

Detroit Pistons 102, Minneapolis Lakers 129
Scoring by quarter: 28–25, 26–31, 26–33, 22–40
Pts: Gene Shue 31	Pts: Elgin Baylor 30
Minneapolis wins series, 2–1

Minneapolis Auditorium, Minneapolis, Minnesota

This was the sixth playoff meeting between these two teams, with the Lakers winning four of the first five meetings while the Pistons were based in Fort Wayne.

Previous playoff series
Minneapolis leads 4–1 in all-time playoff series

1950

Fort Wayne Pistons 0, Minneapolis Lakers 2

1950 Central Division Finals

1953

Fort Wayne Pistons 2, Minneapolis Lakers 3

1953 Western Division Finals

1954

Fort Wayne Pistons 0, Minneapolis Lakers 2

1954 Western Division Round Robin Semifinals

1955

Fort Wayne Pistons 3, Minneapolis Lakers 1

1955 Western Division Finals

1957

Fort Wayne Pistons 0, Minneapolis Lakers 2

1957 Western Division Semifinals

== Division Finals ==
=== Eastern Division Finals ===
==== (1) Boston Celtics vs. (3) Syracuse Nationals ====
March 18

Boxscore

Syracuse Nationals 109, Boston Celtics 131
Scoring by quarter: 17–27, 38–42, 26–29, 28–33
Pts: George Yardley 30; Rebs: George Yardley 17	Pts: Tom Heinsohn 28; Rebs: Bill Russell 32
Boston leads series, 1–0

Boston Garden, Boston, Massachusetts

March 21

Boxscore

Boston Celtics 118, Syracuse Nationals 120
Scoring by quarter: 25–28, 35–29, 31–35, 27–28
Pts: Bob Cousy 27; Rebs: Bill Russell 19	Pts: Dolph Schayes 34; Rebs: Schayes, Kerr 17 each
Series tied, 1–1

Onondaga War Memorial, Syracuse, New York

March 22

Boxscore

Syracuse Nationals 111, Boston Celtics 133
Scoring by quarter: 27–31, 18–34, 33–37, 33–31
Pts: Dolph Schayes 21; Rebs: Connie Dierking 11	Pts: Frank Ramsey 24; Rebs: Bill Russell 27
Boston leads series, 2–1

Boston Garden, Boston, Massachusetts

March 25

Boxscore

Boston Celtics 107, Syracuse Nationals 119
Scoring by quarter: 21–22, 32–40, 30–27, 24–30
Pts: Frank Ramsey 29; Rebs: Bill Russell 21	Pts: Dolph Schayes 28; Rebs: Dolph Schayes 18
Series tied, 2–2

Onondaga War Memorial, Syracuse, New York

March 28

Boxscore

Syracuse Nationals 108, Boston Celtics 129
Scoring by quarter: 32–35, 27–28, 26–30, 23–36
Pts: George Yardley 23; Rebs: Schayes, Kerr 11 each	Pts: Bob Cousy 27; Rebs: Bill Russell 32
Boston leads series, 3–2

Boston Garden, Boston, Massachusetts

March 29

Boxscore

Boston Celtics 121, Syracuse Nationals 133
Scoring by quarter: 28–29, 30–38, 31–32, 32–34
Pts: Frank Ramsey 26; Rebs: Bill Russell 24	Pts: Dolph Schayes 39; Rebs: Dolph Schayes 12
Series tied, 3–3

Onondaga War Memorial, Syracuse, New York

April 1

Boxscore

Syracuse Nationals 125, Boston Celtics 130
Scoring by quarter: 32–26, 36–34, 26–35, 31–35
Pts: Dolph Schayes 35; Rebs: Dolph Schayes 16; Asts: Schayes, Costello 9 each	Pts: Frank Ramsey 28; Rebs: Bill Russell 32; Asts: Bob Cousy 10
Boston wins series, 4–3

Boston Garden, Boston, Massachusetts

This was the seventh playoff meeting between these two teams, with the Nationals winning four of the first six meetings.

Previous playoff series
Syracuse leads 4–2 in all-time playoff series

1953

Boston Celtics 2, Syracuse Nationals 0

1953 Eastern Division Semifinals

1954

Boston Celtics 0, Syracuse Nationals 2

1954 Eastern Division Round Robin Semifinals

1954

Boston Celtics 0, Syracuse Nationals 2

1954 Eastern Division Finals

1955

Boston Celtics 1, Syracuse Nationals 3

1955 Eastern Division Finals

1956

Boston Celtics 1, Syracuse Nationals 2

1956 Eastern Division Semifinals

1957

Boston Celtics 3, Syracuse Nationals 0

1957 Eastern Division Finals

=== Western Division Finals ===
==== (1) St. Louis Hawks vs. (2) Minneapolis Lakers ====
March 21

Boxscore

Minneapolis Lakers 90, St. Louis Hawks 124
Scoring by quarter: 20–27, 18–30, 30–30, 22–37
Pts: Elgin Baylor 21	Pts: Cliff Hagan 40
St. Louis leads series, 1–0

Kiel Auditorium, St. Louis, Missouri

March 22

Boxscore

St. Louis Hawks 98, Minneapolis Lakers 106
Scoring by quarter: 20–29, 25–21, 21–24, 32–32
Pts: Cliff Hagan 27; Rebs: Bob Pettit 7	Pts: Elgin Baylor 33; Rebs: Elgin Baylor 15
Series tied, 1–1

Minneapolis Auditorium, Minneapolis, Minnesota
Referees: Mendy Rudolph, Arnie Heft

March 24

Boxscore

Minneapolis Lakers 97, St. Louis Hawks 127
Scoring by quarter: 21–34, 18–29, 28–30, 30–34
Pts: Baylor, Fleming 15 each Rebs: Elgin Baylor 8	Pts: Bob Pettit 39; Rebs: Cliff Hagan 18
St. Louis leads series, 2–1

Kiel Auditorium, St. Louis, Missouri
Attendance: 9,324
Referees: Sid Borgia, Jim Duffy

March 26

Boxscore

St. Louis Hawks 98, Minneapolis Lakers 108
Scoring by quarter: 22–36, 23–23, 35–19, 18–30
Pts: Cliff Hagan 38	Pts: Elgin Baylor 32
Series tied, 2–2

Minneapolis Auditorium, Minneapolis, Minnesota
Referees: Sid Borgia, Jim Duffy

March 28

Boxscore

Minneapolis Lakers 98, St. Louis Hawks 97 (OT)
Scoring by quarter: 31–23, 18–25, 22–25, 19–17, Overtime: 8–7
Pts: Elgin Baylor 36	Pts: Bob Pettit 36
Minneapolis leads series, 3–2

Kiel Auditorium, St. Louis, Missouri

March 29

Boxscore

St. Louis Hawks 104, Minneapolis Lakers 106
Scoring by quarter: 28–32, 22–24, 29–32, 25–18
Pts: Bob Pettit 24; Rebs: Clyde Lovellette 15	Pts: Elgin Baylor 33; Rebs: Boo Ellis 15
Minneapolis wins series, 4–2

Minneapolis Auditorium, Minneapolis, Minnesota
Attendance: 10,179
Referees: Mendy Rudolph, Arnie Heft

This was the third playoff meeting between these two teams, with the Hawks winning the first two meetings.

Previous playoff series
St. Louis leads 2–0 in all-time playoff series

1956

St. Louis Hawks 2, Minneapolis Lakers 1

1956 Western Division Semifinals

1957

St. Louis Hawks 3, Minneapolis Lakers 0

1957 Western Division Finals

== NBA Finals: (E1) Boston Celtics vs. (W2) Minneapolis Lakers ==
April 4

Boxscore

Minneapolis Lakers 115, Boston Celtics 118
Scoring by quarter: 29–29, 24–36, 31–19, 31–34
Pts: Elgin Baylor 34; Rebs: Larry Foust 19	Pts: Frank Ramsey 29; Rebs: Bill Russell 28
Boston leads series, 1–0

Boston Garden, Boston, Massachusetts
Attendance: 8,195

April 5

Boxscore

Minneapolis Lakers 108, Boston Celtics 128
Scoring by quarter: 17–32, 31–40, 37–28, 23–28
Pts: Vern Mikkelsen 24; Rebs: Steve Hamilton 13	Pts: Bill Sharman 28; Rebs: Bill Russell 30
Boston leads series, 2–0

Boston Garden, Boston, Massachusetts
Attendance: 11,082

April 7

Boxscore

Boston Celtics 123, Minneapolis Lakers 110
Scoring by quarter: 35–27, 34–26, 32–32, 22–25
Pts: Tom Heinsohn 26; Rebs: Bill Russell 30	Pts: Larry Foust 26; Rebs: Larry Foust 22
Boston leads series, 3–0

St. Paul Auditorium, Saint Paul, Minnesota
Attendance: 11,272

April 9

Boxscore

Boston Celtics 118, Minneapolis Lakers 113
Scoring by quarter: 34–34, 30–28, 24–25, 30–26
Pts: Bill Sharman 29; Rebs: Bill Russell 30	Pts: Elgin Baylor 30; Rebs: Elgin Baylor 14
Boston wins series, 4–0

Minneapolis Auditorium, Minneapolis, Minnesota
Attendance: 8,124

- Vern Mikkelsen’s final NBA game.

This was the first playoff meeting between these two teams.
