= 1958–59 Minneapolis Lakers season =

NBA professional basketball team season

- Head coach: John Kundla
- Arena: Minneapolis Auditorium

Results
- Record: 33–39 (.458)
- Place: Division: 2nd (Western)
- Playoff finish: NBA Finals (lost to Celtics 0-4)
- Stats at Basketball Reference

The 1958–59 Minneapolis Lakers season was the 11th season for the franchise in the NBA.

Finishing 2nd in the West with a 33–39 record, the Lakers returned to the playoffs. They beat the Detroit Pistons in three games of the West Semifinals and then the St. Louis Hawks in six games of the West Finals, advancing to the NBA Finals for the first time since 1954. However, they were swept by the Boston Celtics in four games in their penultimate season in Minnesota.

== Preseason ==
=== Draft picks ===
Round	Pick	Player	Position	Nationality	School/Club team
6	40	Alvin Inniss	Center	United States	St. Francis (NY)

== Roster ==
1958–59 Minneapolis Lakers roster
Players

Pos.	No.	Player	Height	Weight	DOB	From
SF	22	Elgin Baylor	6 ft 5 in (1.96 m)	225 lb (102 kg)	1934–09–16	Seattle
PF	12, 23	Boo Ellis	6 ft 5 in (1.96 m)	185 lb (84 kg)	1936-12-11	Niagra
SG	50	Ed Fleming	6 ft 3 in (1.91 m)	189 lb (86 kg)	1933–07–25	Niagra
C	14	Larry Foust	6 ft 9 in (2.06 m)	215 lb (98 kg)	1928–06–24	La Salle
SG	16	Dick Garmaker	6 ft 3 in (1.91 m)	200 lb (91 kg)	1932-10-29	Minnesota
SF	30	Steve Hamilton	6 ft 6 in (1.98 m)	190 lb (86 kg)	1934–11–30	Morehead State
PG	33	Hot Rod Hundley	6 ft 4 in (1.93 m)	185 lb (84 kg)	1934–10–26	West Virginia
C	32	Jim Krebs	6 ft 8 in (2.03 m)	230 lb (104 kg)	1935–09–08	SMU
PG	21	Bobby Leonard	6 ft 3 in (1.91 m)	185 lb (84 kg)	1932–09–17	Indiana
PF	19	Vern Mikkelsen	6 ft 7 in (2.01 m)	230 lb (104 kg)	1928–10–21	Hamline

Coaches
Head coach
- John Kundla

Legend
- (DP) Unsigned draft pick
- (FA) Free agent
- (S) Suspended
- Injured

Roster

== Regular season ==
=== Season standings ===
Western Division	W	L	PCT	GB	Home	Road	Neutral	Div
x-St. Louis Hawks	49	23	.681	–	28–3	14–15	7–5	27–9
x-Minneapolis Lakers	33	39	.458	16	15–7	9–17	9–15	18–18
x-Detroit Pistons	28	44	.389	21	13–17	8–20	7–7	17–19
Cincinnati Royals	19	53	.264	30	9–19	2–25	8–9	10–26

x - clinched playoff spot

=== Game log ===
#	Date	Opponent	Score	High points	Record
1	October 22	Cincinnati	79–99	Elgin Baylor (25)	1–0
2	October 25	@ Cincinnati	94–110	Dick Garmaker (23)	1–1
3	October 26	Detroit	100–108	Vern Mikkelsen (22)	2–1
4	October 29	St. Louis	112–100	Baylor, Garmaker, Leonard (13)	2–2
5	November 1	@ St. Louis	108–101	Elgin Baylor (29)	3–2
6	November 6	Philadelphia	101–103	Elgin Baylor (26)	4–2
7	November 8	New York	108–100	Jim Krebs (18)	4–3
8	November 9	@ Syracuse	97–101	Elgin Baylor (34)	4–4
9	November 11	@ Boston	113–116 (OT)	Elgin Baylor (36)	4–5
10	November 13	N Detroit	110–119	Elgin Baylor (28)	4–6
11	November 15	@ Philadelphia	101–106	Elgin Baylor (26)	4–7
12	November 16	@ New York	90–98	Elgin Baylor (18)	4–8
13	November 20	Syracuse	102–121	Elgin Baylor (37)	5–8
14	November 22	@ St. Louis	109–114	Elgin Baylor (30)	5–9
15	November 23	Detroit	124–109	Elgin Baylor (30)	5–10
16	November 24	N Boston	104–123	Baylor, Leonard (22)	5–11
17	November 25	@ Detroit	98–90	Elgin Baylor (19)	6–11
18	November 28	Cincinnati	93–114	Elgin Baylor (26)	7–11
19	November 29	@ Syracuse	108–105	Elgin Baylor (35)	8–11
20	November 30	@ Cincinnati	84–77	Elgin Baylor (21)	9–11
21	December 6	N Cincinnati	128–132 (3OT)	Elgin Baylor (30)	9–12
22	December 9	@ New York	97–110	Elgin Baylor (23)	9–13
23	December 11	Syracuse	101–99 (OT)	Elgin Baylor (31)	9–14
24	December 14	New York	100–99	Elgin Baylor (21)	9–15
25	December 18	Detroit	104–113	Elgin Baylor (26)	10–15
26	December 20	Philadelphia	88–99	Elgin Baylor (33)	11–15
27	December 25	N Detroit	97–98 (OT)	Larry Foust (21)	11–16
28	December 26	N Boston	99–107	Vern Mikkelsen (20)	11–17
29	December 27	Boston	112–94	Vern Mikkelsen (16)	11–18
30	December 28	@ Cincinnati	116–120	Bobby Leonard (20)	11–19
31	December 29	N Philadelphia	95–93	Elgin Baylor (21)	11–20
32	December 30	N Syracuse	113–118	Dick Garmaker (27)	12–20
33	January 1	@ Syracuse	106–105	Elgin Baylor (22)	13–20
34	January 2	New York	97–107	Dick Garmaker (27)	14–20
35	January 4	@ Philadelphia	111–95	Elgin Baylor (28)	15–20
36	January 5	@ Boston	106–118	Elgin Baylor (30)	15–21
37	January 6	N St. Louis	112–95	Vern Mikkelsen (17)	15–22
38	January 7	N St. Louis	89–78	Elgin Baylor (21)	15–23
39	January 8	N St. Louis	93–95	Dick Garmaker (22)	16–23
40	January 11	N Boston	106–109 (OT)	Dick Garmaker (20)	16–24
41	January 12	N Boston	108–117	Elgin Baylor (30)	16–25
42	January 13	@ St. Louis	95–110	Boo Ellis (18)	16–26
43	January 15	@ Syracuse	105–111	Elgin Baylor (19)	16–27
44	January 16	N Cincinnati	91–95	Larry Foust (23)	16–28
45	January 18	Philadelphia	98–119	Elgin Baylor (30)	17–28
46	January 25	@ Philadelphia	111–125	Elgin Baylor (41)	17–29
47	January 28	Syracuse	109–112	Elgin Baylor (38)	18–29
48	January 29	N Syracuse	117–91	Vern Mikkelsen (16)	18–30
49	January 30	N Detroit	88–86	Elgin Baylor (23)	19–30
50	January 31	N St. Louis	120–96	Elgin Baylor (16)	19–31
51	February 7	Philadelphia	97–109	Vern Mikkelsen (27)	20–31
52	February 8	@ Detroit	115–103	Elgin Baylor (27)	21–31
53	February 9	New York	122–128	Elgin Baylor (31)	22–31
54	February 10	N Cincinnati	118–100	Vern Mikkelsen (43)	23–31
55	February 11	N Cincinnati	106–105	Larry Foust (36)	24–31
56	February 12	N Cincinnati	114–119	Baylor, Fleming (28)	24–34
57	February 14	@ St. Louis	96–139	Elgin Baylor (26)	24–33
58	February 15	St. Louis	98–109	Elgin Baylor (26)	25–33
59	February 17	@ Detroit	97–90	Larry Foust (22)	26–33
60	February 18	Detroit	95–105	Elgin Baylor (29)	27–33
61	February 20	N New York	106–116	Baylor, Garmaker (20)	28–33
62	February 22	@ St. Louis	106–120	Dick Garmaker (27)	28–34
63	February 25	N Cincinnati	116–96	Elgin Baylor (55)	29–34
64	February 27	@ Boston	139–173	Elgin Baylor (28)	29–35
65	February 28	@ New York	107–112	Elgin Baylor (34)	29–36
66	March 1	N Philadelphia	98–100	Elgin Baylor (23)	30–36
67	March 3	N Boston	112–119	Elgin Baylor (24)	30–37
68	March 4	@ Cincinnati	122–128	Elgin Baylor (33)	30–38
69	March 5	N New York	115–135	Elgin Baylor (32)	31–38
70	March 6	@ Detroit	99–98	Larry Foust (23)	32–38
71	March 8	St. Louis	104–120	Elgin Baylor (36)	33–38
72	March 11	Detroit	123–118	Elgin Baylor (39)	33–39

== Playoffs ==
1959 playoff game log
Division semifinals: 2–1 (home: 2–0; road: 0–1)

Game	Date	Team	Score	High points	Location	Series
1	March 14	Detroit	W 92–89	Larry Foust (17)	Minneapolis Auditorium	1–0
2	March 15	@ Detroit	L 103–117	Elgin Baylor (26)	Detroit Olympia	1–1
3	March 18	Detroit	W 129–102	Elgin Baylor (30)	Minneapolis Auditorium	2–1

Division finals: 4–2 (home: 3–0; road: 1–2)

Game	Date	Team	Score	High points	High rebounds	Location Attendance	Series
1	March 21	@ St. Louis	L 90–124	Elgin Baylor (21)	—	Kiel Auditorium	0–1
2	March 22	St. Louis	W 106–98	Elgin Baylor (33)	Elgin Baylor (15)	Minneapolis Auditorium	1–1
3	March 24	@ St. Louis	L 97–127	Baylor, Fleming (15)	Elgin Baylor (8)	Kiel Auditorium; 9,324	1–2
4	March 26	St. Louis	W 108–98	Elgin Baylor (32)	—	Minneapolis Auditorium	2–2
5	March 28	@ St. Louis	W 98–97 (OT)	Elgin Baylor (36)	—	Kiel Auditorium	3–2
6	March 29	St. Louis	W 106–104	Elgin Baylor (33)	Boo Ellis (15)	Minneapolis Auditorium; 10,179	4–2

NBA Finals: 0–4 (home: 0–2; road: 0–2)

Game	Date	Team	Score	High points	High rebounds	Location Attendance	Series
1	April 4	@ Boston	L 115–118	Elgin Baylor (34)	Larry Foust (19)	Boston Garden; 8,195	0–1
2	April 5	@ Boston	L 108–128	Vern Mikkelsen (24)	Steve Hamilton (13)	Boston Garden; 11,082	0–2
3	April 7	Boston	L 110–123	Larry Foust (26)	Larry Foust (22)	St. Paul Auditorium; 11,272	0–3
4	April 9	Boston	L 113–118	Elgin Baylor (30)	Elgin Baylor (14)	Minneapolis Auditorium; 8,124	0–4

1959 schedule

== Awards and records ==
- Elgin Baylor, NBA Rookie of the Year Award
- Elgin Baylor, All-NBA First Team
- Elgin Baylor, NBA All-Star Game
- Dick Garmaker, NBA All-Star Game
- Larry Foust, NBA All-Star Game
- Elgin Baylor, NBA All-Star Game Most Valuable Player Award
