= Archie Dees =

American basketball player

Personal information
- Born: February 22, 1936 Ethel, Mississippi, U.S.
- Died: April 4, 2016 (aged 80) Bloomington, Indiana, U.S.
- Listed height: 6 ft 8 in (2.03 m)
- Listed weight: 205 lb (93 kg)

Career information
- High school: Mount Carmel (Mount Carmel, Illinois)
- College: Indiana (1955–1958)
- NBA draft: 1958: 1st round, 2nd overall pick
- Drafted by: Cincinnati Royals
- Playing career: 1958–1962
- Position: Power forward / center
- Number: 22, 44, 29

Career history
- 1958–1959: Cincinnati Royals
- 1959–1961: Detroit Pistons
- 1961: Chicago Packers
- 1961: St. Louis Hawks
- 1961–1962: Cleveland Pipers

Career highlights
- Consensus second-team All-American (1958)

Career NBA statistics
- Points: 1,548 (8.1 ppg)
- Rebounds: 907 (4.8 rpg)
- Assists: 132 (0.7 apg)
- Stats at NBA.com
- Stats at Basketball Reference

William Archie Dees (February 22, 1936 – April 4, 2016) was an American professional basketball player. Dees was the second-overall pick in the 1958 NBA draft from Indiana University.

== Basketball career ==
A 6'8" forward/center born in Ethel, Mississippi, Dees started his basketball career at Mount Carmel High School in Mount Carmel, Illinois. He was later named an All-American his senior year, scoring a record 2,337 points.

Afterward, he attended Indiana University, where he received the Big Ten Conference Most Valuable Player award twice, in 1957 and 1958. Dees is one of three people (the others being Jerry Lucas and Scott May) to have received multiple Big Ten MVP honors.

When he graduated in 1958, Dees was drafted as the second-overall pick by the Cincinnati Royals of the National Basketball Association. He went on to play four seasons in the league with the Royals, Detroit Pistons, Chicago Packers, and St. Louis Hawks.

== Honors and personal life ==
Dees was inducted into the Indiana University Hall of Fame in 1983.

In 2001, he was named to the Indiana University All-Century Team.

Dees died April 4, 2016, in Bloomington, Indiana.

== Career statistics ==
Legend
GP	Games played	GS	Games started	MPG	Minutes per game
FG%	Field goal percentage	3P%	3-point field goal percentage	FT%	Free throw percentage
RPG	Rebounds per game	APG	Assists per game	SPG	Steals per game
BPG	Blocks per game	PPG	Points per game	**Bold**	Career high

=== NBA ===
==== Regular season ====
Year	Team	GP	MPG	FG%	FT%	RPG	APG	PPG
1958–59	Cincinnati	68	**18.4**	.356	.779	5.0	.8	8.2
1959–60	Detroit	**73**	17.0	.439	.809	**5.4**	.6	9.7
1960–61	Detroit	28	11.0	.393	**.830**	3.4	.6	5.2
1961–62	Chicago	13	16.7	.437	.771	4.5	**.9**	**7.9**
1961–62	St. Louis	8	8.9	**.464**	.727	2.4	.5	4.3
Career		190	16.3	.402	.794	4.8	.7	8.1

==== Playoffs ====
Year	Team	GP	MPG	FG%	FT%	RPG	APG	PPG
1960	Detroit	2	9.0	.333	1.000	2.0	1.0	5.5
