= 1958–59 Cincinnati Royals season =

NBA professional basketball team season

- Head coach: Bobby Wanzer; Tom Marshall
- Owners: Thomas E. Wood
- Arena: Cincinnati Gardens

Results
- Record: 19–53 (.264)
- Place: Division: 4th (Western)
- Playoff finish: Did not qualify
- Stats at Basketball Reference

Local media
- Television: WKRC-TV
- Radio: WKRC

The 1958–59 Cincinnati Royal season was the 14th season of the franchise, its 11th season in the NBA and second season in Cincinnati.

This season is being one of the most notorious seasons faced by an NBA team in the league's history. The reason was the tragic career-ending head injury to star Maurice Stokes, who became permanently hospitalized at the age of 24 at the end of the previous season, which had been the team's first in Cincinnati. The loss of Stokes shocked six other roster players into retirement. Also, the team had been sold to new, inexperienced local ownership and also soon had to replace their coach. Star shooter Jack Twyman returned for the club as the only returnee from the previous year. Had Twyman accepted other offers that year, the team would have likely folded.

St. Louis owner Ben Kerner, a long-time friend of previous owners Les and Jack Harrison, agreed to help the club. He sent five players to the Royals in return for All-Pro Clyde Lovellette and the rights to talented Si Green. The result was a diluted roster of rookies and journeymen. Two rookies were burly 6-foot 8-inch big man Wayne Embry and 6' 4 defender Arlen Bockhorn. They had to make the team before signing contracts Twyman was far and away the team's only star. He scored 25.8 points per game, trying more shots than any player in the league for his new team. The slender 6-foot 6-inch star also led the Royals in rebounds, and came within 16 assists of leading the team there as well. More than that, he mentored the new players and also carried on Stokes's charity causes off the court. He achieved a kind of fame, respect and notoriety unlike any NBA player ever. One of his creations to pay for his fallen teammate's soaring hospital bills was The Maurice Stokes Charity Game, which was played at Kutscher's Resort in Monticello, New York, every August. A slew of NBA notables came to play in the event for Stokes every year.

Despite Twyman's starring play, the Royals sank to 19–53 this season. To limit over-exposure of their difficult season, 17 home games were played elsewhere. Several times that year, the team failed to draw 2000 fans to Cincinnati Gardens.

Somehow, the new ownership made it through the season and vowed to carry on. The NBA helped by granting territorial draft picks to Oscar Robertson, Ralph Davis from the local University of Cincinnati, and a local high school player Jerry Lucas.

== Regular season ==
=== Season standings ===
Western Division	W	L	PCT	GB	Home	Road	Neutral	Div
x-St. Louis Hawks	49	23	.681	–	28–3	14–15	7–5	27–9
x-Minneapolis Lakers	33	39	.458	16	15–7	9–17	9–15	18–18
x-Detroit Pistons	28	44	.389	21	13–17	8–20	7–7	17–19
Cincinnati Royals	19	53	.264	30	9–19	2–25	8–9	10–26

x – clinched playoff spot

=== Game log ===
1958–59 Game log
#	Date	Opponent	Score	High points	Record
1	October 22	@ Minneapolis	79–99	Dave Piontek (17)	1–0
2	October 25	Minneapolis	94–110	Jack Twyman (29)	1–1
3	October 31	@ Detroit	113–120	Jack Twyman (27)	1–2
4	November 1	@ Syracuse	108–130	Jack Twyman (22)	1–3
5	November 2	St. Louis	97–90	Sihugo Green (19)	1–4
6	November 5	New York	108–97	Jack Twyman (26)	1–5
7	November 9	Philadelphia	106–92	Jim Palmer (20)	1–6
8	November 12	Syracuse	116–115	Jack Twyman (32)	1–7
9	November 15	@ Boston	105–130	Jack Twyman (33)	1–8
10	November 19	Boston	103–119	Jack Twyman (45)	2–8
11	November 21	@ Philadelphia	90–108	Vernon Hatton (22)	2–9
12	November 22	@ Detroit	86–103	Jack Twyman (23)	2–10
13	November 23	St. Louis	100–89	Jim Palmer (22)	2–11
14	November 25	@ New York	115–113	Jack Twyman (26)	3–11
15	November 26	Detroit	112–95	Jack Twyman (19)	3–12
16	November 28	@ Minneapolis	93–114	Jack Twyman (22)	3–13
17	November 29	@ St. Louis	86–98	Jack Twyman (18)	3–14
18	November 30	Minneapolis	84–77	Dave Piontek (22)	3–15
19	December 2	N St. Louis	105–81	Sihugo Green (22)	3–16
20	December 3	New York	108–110	Arlen Bockhorn (23)	4–16
21	December 6	N Minneapolis	128–132 (3OT)	Jack Twyman (34)	5–16
22	December 7	Philadelphia	103–90	Jack Twyman (20)	5–17
23	December 10	Syracuse	97–94	Jack Twyman (20)	5–18
24	December 12	@ Boston	115–125 (OT)	McCarthy, Twyman (22)	5–19
25	December 16	@ New York	106–118	Jack Twyman (24)	5–20
26	December 18	Boston	104–90	Jack Twyman (26)	5–21
27	December 20	@ Syracuse	121–120 (OT)	Jack Twyman (27)	6–21
28	December 25	St. Louis	100–92	Jack Twyman (29)	6–22
29	December 26	@ Detroit	91–131	Jack Twyman (28)	6–23
30	December 28	Minneapolis	116–120	Jack Twyman (32)	7–23
31	December 29	@ St. Louis	112–124	Jack Twyman (32)	7–24
32	December 30	St. Louis	119–104	Jack Twyman (20)	7–25
33	January 2	N Detroit	104–111	Jack Twyman (34)	8–25
34	January 4	Boston	111–108	Wayne Embry (27)	8–26
35	January 6	N Boston	95–109	Jack Twyman (33)	8–27
36	January 8	Syracuse	145–138 (3OT)	Jack Twyman (41)	8–28
37	January 9	N St. Louis	112–101	Arlen Bockhorn (27)	8–29
38	January 10	Detroit	101–69	Jack Twyman (14)	8–30
39	January 11	@ Syracuse	110–127	Wayne Embry (27)	8–31
40	January 13	N Detroit	112–92	Jim Palmer (14)	8–32
41	January 16	N Minneapolis	91–95	Jack Twyman (30)	9–32
42	January 17	@ New York	105–117	Jack Twyman (36)	9–33
43	January 18	Detroit	88–107	Archie Dees (18)	10–33
44	January 20	N New York	108–114	Jack Twyman (30)	11–33
45	January 21	New York	130–109	Arlen Bockhorn (27)	11–34
46	January 24	@ Syracuse	102–123	Archie Dees (23)	11–35
47	January 25	Syracuse	104–109	Jack Twyman (33)	12–35
48	January 27	N Philadelphia	92–100	Jack Twyman (37)	13–35
49	January 28	@ Philadelphia	84–99	Archie Dees (14)	13–36
50	January 30	@ St. Louis	87–118	Jack Twyman (21)	13–37
51	January 31	@ Detroit	88–103	Dees, Park (14)	13–38
52	February 3	Philadelphia	103–120	Jack Twyman (31)	14–38
53	February 8	@ Boston	117–136	Jack Twyman (30)	14–39
54	February 9	N Detroit	122–97	Jack Twyman (30)	14–40
55	February 10	N Minneapolis	118–100	Med Park (25)	14–41
56	February 11	N Minneapolis	106–105	Johnny McCarthy (31)	14–42
57	February 12	N Minneapolis	114–119	Jack Twyman (33)	15–42
58	February 14	N Philadelphia	106–94	Jack Twyman (35)	15–43
59	February 15	@ New York	97–124	Jack Twyman (27)	15–44
60	February 18	New York	118–116	Jack Twyman (34)	15–45
61	February 21	@ St. Louis	120–121	Jack Twyman (38)	15–46
62	February 22	Boston	129–112	Johnny McCarthy (26)	15–47
63	February 24	N Syracuse	109–113	Jack Twyman (29)	16–47
64	February 25	N Minneapolis	116–96	Jack Twyman (34)	16–48
65	February 26	N Detroit	101–106	Jack Twyman (27)	17–48
66	February 28	St. Louis	122–124 (OT)	Jack Twyman (50)	18–48
67	March 1	@ Detroit	101–117	Jack Twyman (30)	18–49
68	March 3	@ St. Louis	102–113	Jack Twyman (26)	18–50
69	March 4	Minneapolis	122–128	Jack Twyman (46)	19–50
70	March 7	@ Philadelphia	86–93	Jack Twyman (21)	19–51
71	March 8	@ Boston	131–141	Jack Twyman (45)	19–52
72	March 10	Philadelphia	102–96	Jack Twyman (26)	19–53

== Player statistics ==
Legend
GP	Games played	GS	Games started	MPG	Minutes per game
FG%	Field-goal percentage	3P%	3-point field-goal percentage	FT%	Free-throw percentage
RPG	Rebounds per game	APG	Assists per game	SPG	Steals per game
BPG	Blocks per game	PPG	Points per game

Player	GP	GS	MPG	FG%	3FG%	FT%	RPG	APG	SPG	BPG	PPG
Arlen Bockhorn											
Archie Dees											
Wayne Embry											
Si Green											
Vernon Hatton											
Tom Marshall											
Johnny McCarthy											
Jim Palmer											
Med Park											
Jack Parr											
Dave Piontek											
Phil Rollins											
Larry Staverman											
Jack Twyman											
