= Niagara Purple Eagles men's basketball =

Men's basketball team of Niagara University

Niagara Purple Eagles
2026–27 Niagara Purple Eagles men's basketball team
- University: Niagara University
- Head coach: Greg Paulus (8th season)
- Location: Lewiston, New York
- Arena: Gallagher Center (capacity: 2,400)
- Conference: MAAC
- Nickname: Purple Eagles
- Colors: Purple and white
- All-time record: 1508–1290–1 (.539)

NCAA Division I tournament Sweet Sixteen
- 1970

NCAA Division I tournament appearances
- 1970, 2005, 2007

Conference tournament champions
- 2005, 2007

Conference regular-season champions
- 1999, 2005, 2013; WNY3: 1948, 1949, 1950, 1953, 1954, 1955

Uniforms
Home	Away

For information on all Niagara University sports, see Niagara Purple Eagles

The Niagara Purple Eagles men's basketball team is the college basketball team that represents Niagara University in Lewiston, New York, United States. The school's team currently competes in the Metro Atlantic Athletic Conference. The team formerly played at the now-defunct Niagara Falls Convention and Civic Center from 1973 to 1982 and from 1988 to 1996.

== History ==
Niagara has played in the NCAA Tournament three times. They last played in the NCAA Division I men's basketball tournament in 2007. They played in the National Invitation Tournament on 14 occasions, advancing to the championship game in 1972 before losing to Maryland. Niagara has been ranked in the AP Final Polls twice, 16th in 1954 and 17th in 1970.

=== Coaching history ===
No.	Tenure	Coach	Years	Record	Pct.
1	1905–1906	Charles McGrath	1	4–2	.667
2	1906–1908	Jack Reed	2	11–11	.500
3	1908–1909	Bob Yates	1	2–7	.222
4	1909–1910	Claude Allen	1	13–3	.813
5	1910–1911	Alfred Heerdt	1	7–7	.500
6	1911–1915	A.V. Barrett	4	37–33	.529
7	1915–1916	Tom Tracey	2	6–11	.353
8	1916–1918	John O'Shea	2	9–3	.750
9	1918–1923	John Blake*	4	61–14	.813
10	1923–1927	Pete Dwyer	4	41–30	.577
11	1927–1931	William McCarthy	4	44–35	.557
12	1931–1943; 1946–1965	Taps Gallagher	31	465–261	.640
13	1944–1946	Edward T. Flynn	2	18–14	.563
14	1965–1968	James Maloney	3	35–38	.479
15	1968–1976	Frank Layden	8	119–97	.551
16	1976–1980	Dan Raskin	4	44–61	.419
17	1980–1985	Pete Lonergan	5	67–73	.479
18	1985–1989	Andy Walker	4	59–58	.504
19	1989–1998	Jack Armstrong	9	100–154	.394
20	1998–2013	Joe Mihalich	15	265–203	.566
21	2013–2019	Chris Casey	6	64–129	.332
	2019	Patrick Beilein		–	–
22	2019–present	Greg Paulus^	7	86–120	.417
Totals		22 coaches	120 seasons	1,557–1,364	.533
Records updated through end of 2025–26 season Source; *Alum^Promoted from assistant to head coach

== Roster ==
2023-2024 Niagara Purple Eagles
Number	Name	Position	Height	Year	Previous school	Hometown
1	Randy Tucker	Guard	6'4"	Graduate student	Green Bay	Rock Island, Illinois (United States)
2	Lance Erving	Guard	6'3"	Senior	Chipola Community College	Leesburg, Florida (United States)
4	Braxton Bayless	Guard	6'2"	Senior	Indian Hills Community College	Ankeny, Iowa (United States)
5	Luke Bumbalough	Guard	6'1"	Graduate student	Ball State	New Castle, Indiana (United States)
10	Jalen Brown	Guard	5'10"	Sophomore	De La Salle	Chicago, Illinois (United States)
11	Ahmad Henderson II	Guard	5'9"	Sophomore	Brother Rice	Chicago, Illinois (United States)
12	Kwane Marble Jr.	Guard	6'5"	Graduate student	Loyola Marymount	Denver, Colorado (United States)
13	Dre Bullock	Forward	6'6"	Junior	LA Tech	Franklinton, North Carolina (United States)
15	Yaw Obeng-Mensah	Forward	6'7"	Senior	UMBC	Toronto, Ontario (Canada)
20	Malik Edwards	Guard	6'2"	Junior	William Penn (NAIA)	Philadelphia, Pennsylvania (United States)
24	Aime Rutayisire	Forward	6'8"	Sophomore	Barton (NJCAA)	Adelaide, South Australia
55	Harlan Obioha	Forward	7'0"	Sophomore	Hoxie High School	Hoxie, Kansas (United States)

== Postseason ==
=== NCAA tournament results ===
The Purple Eagles have appeared in three NCAA Tournaments. Their combined record is 2–4.

Year	Round	Opponent	Result
1970	First Round; Sweet Sixteen; Regional third place Game	Pennsylvania; Villanova; North Carolina State	W 79–69; L 73–98; L 88–108
2005	First Round	Oklahoma	L 67–85
2007	Opening Round; First Round	Florida A&M; Kansas	W 77–69; L 67–107

=== NIT results ===
The Purple Eagles have appeared in 14 National Invitation Tournaments. Their combined record is 9–14.

Year	Round	Opponent	Result
1950	First Round	Western Kentucky	L 72–79
1953	First Round; Quarterfinals	BYU; Seton Hall	W 82–76; L 74–79
1954	Quarterfinals; Semifinals; 3rd Place Game	Dayton; Duquesne; Western Kentucky	W 77–74; L 51–66; W 71–65
1955	First Round; Quarterfinals	Lafayette; Cincinnati	W 83–70; L 83–85
1956	Quarterfinals	St. Francis (NY)	L 72–74
1958	First Round	Xavier	L 86–95
1961	Quarterfinals	Providence	L 68–71
1972	First Round; Quarterfinals; Semifinals; Finals	UTEP; Princeton; St. John's; Maryland	W 76–57; W 65–60; W 69–67; L 69–100
1976	First Round	Kentucky	L 61–67
1987	First Round; Second Round	Seton Hall; La Salle	W 74–65; L 81–89
1993	First Round	Boston College	L 83–87
2004	Opening Round; First Round	Troy; Nebraska	W 87–83; L 70–78
2009	First Round	Rhode Island	L 62–68
2013	First Round	Maryland	L 72–86

=== CIT results ===
The Purple Eagles made their first appearance in the CollegeInsider.com Postseason Tournament (CIT) in 2018. Their record is 0–1.

Year	Round	Opponent	Result
2018	First Round	Eastern Michigan	L 65–83

== All time MAAC Awards ==
Award	Name	Winner
All-MAAC First Team	Patrick Jones	1989-90
All-MAAC First Team	Brian Clifford	1991-92
All-MAAC First Team	Brian Clifford	1992-93
All-MAAC First Team	Chris Watson	1995-96
All-MAAC First Team	Alvin Young	1998-99
All-MAAC First Team	Demond Stewart	2000-01
All-MAAC First Team	Daryl Greene	2001-02
All-MAAC First Team	Juan Mendez	2002-03
All-MAAC First Team	Juan Mendez	2003-04
All-MAAC First Team	Juan Mendez	2004-05
All-MAAC First Team	Charron Fisher	2006-07
All-MAAC First Team	Charron Fisher	2007-08
All-MAAC First Team	Tyrone Lewis	2008-09
All-MAAC First Team	Bilal Benn	2008-09
All-MAAC First Team	Juan'ya Green	2012-13
All-MAAC First Team	Antoine Mason	2012-13
All-MAAC First Team	Kahlil Dukes	2017-18
All-MAAC First Team	Marcus Hammond	2019-20
All-MAAC First Team	Marcus Hammond	2021-22
All-MAAC First Team	Noah Thomasson	2022-23
All-MAAC Second Team	Brian Clifford	1990-91
All-MAAC Second Team	Rob Robinson	1992-93
All-MAAC Second Team	Chris Watson	1994-95
All-MAAC Second Team	Chris Watson	1996-97
All-MAAC Second Team	Jermaine Young	1997-98
All-MAAC Second Team	Jeremiah Johnson	1998-99
All-MAAC Second Team	Demond Stewart	1999-00
All-MAAC Second Team	Daryl Greene	1999-00
All-MAAC Second Team	Tremmell Darden	2002-03
All-MAAC Second Team	Tremmell Darden	2003-04
All-MAAC Second Team	Alvin Cruz	2004-05
All-MAAC Second Team	Clif Brown	2006-07
All-MAAC Second Team	Tyrone Lewis	2007-08
All-MAAC Second Team	Benson Egemonye	2008-09
All-MAAC Second Team	Tyrone Lewis	2009-10
All-MAAC Second Team	Bilal Benn	2009-10
All-MAAC Second Team	Anthony Nelson	2010-11
All-MAAC Second Team	Antoine Mason	2013-14
All-MAAC Second Team	Matt Scott	2017-18
All-MAAC Second Team	Marvin Prochet	2018-19
All-MAAC Second Team	Kobi Nwandu	2020-21
All-MAAC Second Team	Marcus Hammond	2020-21
All-MAAC Third Team	Alvin Young	1997-98
All-MAAC Third Team	Michael Schmidt	2000-01
All-MAAC Third Team	Tremmell Darden	2001-02
All-MAAC Third Team	David Brooks	2003-04
All-MAAC Third Team	James Reaves	2003-04
All-MAAC Third Team	Clif Brown	2005-06
All-MAAC Third Team	Lorenzo Miles	2006-07
All-MAAC Third Team	Stanley Hodge	2007-08
All-MAAC Third Team	Juan'ya Green	2011-12
All-MAAC Third Team	Matt Scott	2015-16
All-MAAC Third Team	Matt Scott	2016-17
All-MAAC Rookie Team	Juan Mendez	2001-02
All-MAAC Rookie Team	Tyrone Lewis	2006-07
All-MAAC Rookie Team	Anthony Nelson	2007-08
All-MAAC Rookie Team	Marvin Jordan	2010-11
All-MAAC Rookie Team	Juan'ya Green	2011-12
All-MAAC Rookie Team	Antoine Mason	2011-12
All-MAAC Rookie Team	T.J. Cline	2012-13
All-MAAC Rookie Team	Dominique Reid	2014-15
Player of the year	Alvin Young	1998-99
Player of the year	Demond Stewart	2000-01
Player of the year	Juan Mendez	2004-05
Player of the year	Kahlil Dukes	2017-18
Defensive player of the year	Tyrone Lewis	2008-09
Defensive player of the year	Anthony Nelson	2010-11
Rookie of the year	Brian Clifford	1990-91
Rookie of the year	Juan'ya Green	2011-12
Sixth man of the year	Juan Mendez	2001-02
Sixth man of the year	James Mathis	2004-05
Sixth man of the year	Clif Brown	2005-06
Coach of the Year	Jack Armstrong	1992-93
Coach of the Year	Joe Mihalich	1998-99
Coach of the Year	Joe Mihalich	2004-05
Coach of the Year	Joe Mihalich	2012-13

*Up to 2021-22 season

== Seasons ==
Record table
Season	Team	Overall	Conference	Standing	Postseason
1969–70	Niagara	22–7			NCAA Regional semifinals
1970–71	Niagara	15–11			
1971–72	Niagara	21–9			NIT Championship game
1972–73	Niagara	9–16			
1973–74	Niagara	12–14			
1974–75	Niagara	13–14			
1975–76	Niagara	17–12			
1976–77	Niagara	13–13			
1977–78	Niagara	14–12			
1978–79	Niagara	6–20			
Niagara University Purple Eagles (ECAC North) (1979–1987)
1979–80	Niagara	11–16	11–15	8th	
1980–81	Niagara	11–15	11–15	T–6th	
1981–82	Niagara	19–8	7–2	T–2nd	
1982–83	Niagara	11–18	5–4	5th	
1983–84	Niagara	10–18	5–9	6th	
1984–85	Niagara	16–12	11–5	4th	
1985–86	Niagara	14–14	10–8	T–5th	
1986–87	Niagara	21–10	14–4	2nd	NIT Second round
Niagara University Purple Eagles (North Atlantic Conference) (1987–1989)
1987–88	Niagara	15–15	12–6	T–3rd	
1988–89	Niagara	9–19	6–12	7th	
Niagara University Purple Eagles (Metro Atlantic Athletic Conference) (1989–Present)
1989–90	Niagara	6–22	5–11	T–4th	
1990–91	Niagara	8–20	6–10	6th	
1991–92	Niagara	14–14	8–8	T–5th	
1992–93	Niagara	23–7	11–3	2nd	NIT First round
1993–94	Niagara	6–21	3–11	T–7th	
1994–95	Niagara	5–25	2–12	8th	
1995–96	Niagara	13–15	6–8	6th	
1996–97	Niagara	11–17	5–9	T–5th	
1997–98	Niagara	14–13	10–8	T–3rd	
1998–99	Niagara	17–12	13–5	T–1st	
1999–00	Niagara	17–12	10–8	T–4th	
2000–01	Niagara	15–13	12–6	T–1st	
2001–02	Niagara	18–14	10–6	T–3rd	
2002–03	Niagara	17–12	12–6	T–3rd	
2003–04	Niagara	22–10	13–5	2nd	NIT First round
2004–05	Niagara	20–10	13–5	T–1st	NCAA first round
2005–06	Niagara	11–18	7–11	T–7th	
2006–07	Niagara	23–12	13–5	2nd	NCAA first round
2007–08	Niagara	19–10	12–6	T–3rd	
2008–09	Niagara	26–9	14–4	2nd	NIT First round
2009–10	Niagara	18–15	9–9	T–5th	
2010–11	Niagara	9–23	5–13	8th	
2011–12	Niagara	14–19	8–10	T–6th	
2012–13	Niagara	19–14	13–5	1st	NIT First round
2013–14	Niagara	7–26	3–17	11th	
2014–15	Niagara	8–22	7–13	T–8th	
2015–16	Niagara	7–25	5–15	10th	
2016–17	Niagara	10–23	6–14	9th	
2017–18	Niagara	19–14	12–6	3rd	CIT First round
2018–19	Niagara	13–19	6–12	T–9th	
2019–20	Niagara	12–20	9–11	T–6th	
2020–21	Niagara	9–11	7–9	5th	
2021–22	Niagara	14-16	9-11	5th	
2022–23	Niagara	16-15	10-10	5th	
2023–24	Niagara	16-16	11-9	6th	
Niagara Purple Eagles:		496–564 (.468)	305–311 (.495)		
Total:		496–564 (.468)			
National champion Postseason invitational champion Conference regular season champion Conference regular season and conference tournament champion Division regular season champion Division regular season and conference tournament champion Conference tournament champion

== Niagara wins vs. the AP Top 25 ==
Year	Opponent	Score	Site
1950–51	#17 St.Bonaventure #7 St.Johns	W 72–57; W 77–75	Home; Away
1953–54	#6 La Salle #16 La Salle #14 Dayton #4 Western Kentucky	W 74–66; W 69–50; W 77–74; W 71–65	Home; Home; Neutral; Neutral
1954–55	#14 Holy Cross	W 72–68	Away
1955–56	#18 La Salle	W 72–70	Away
1957–58	#16 Western Kentucky	W 77–74 OT	Neutral
1960–61	#2 St.Bonaventure	W 87–77	Away
1966–67	#9 Providence	W 77–76	Home
1969–70	#6 Tennessee #7 Pennsylvania	W 69–68; W 79–69	Neutral; Neutral
1970–71	#9 Drake	W 87–77	Neutral
1984–85	#4 St.Johns	W 62–59	Home

== Retired jerseys ==
Niagara has retired nine jerseys.

Niagara Purple Eagles retired numbers
No.	Player	Career
3	Boo Ellis	1955–1958
3	Phil Scaffidi	1975–1980
4	Al Butler	1958–1961
11	Tom Birch	1948–1951
19	Zeke Sinicola	1948–1951
21	James Moran	1948–1951
23	Calvin Murphy	1967–1970
69	Larry Costello	1951–1954
70	Ed Fleming	1951–1955

== Head coaches ==
Name	Years	Seasons	Wins	Losses	Pct
Greg Paulus*	2019–present	4	20	30	0.400
Patrick Beilein*	2019*	N/A	N/A	N/A	N/A
Chris Casey	2013–2019	6	64	129	0.332
Joe Mihalich	1998–2013	15	265	203	0.566
Jack Armstrong	1989–1998	9	100	154	0.394
Andy Walker	1985–1989	4	59	58	0.504
Pete Lonergan	1980–1985	5	67	73	0.479
Dan Raskin	1976–1980	4	44	61	0.419
Frank Layden	1968–1976	8	119	97	0.551
James Maloney	1965–1968	3	35	38	0.479
Taps Gallagher	1946–1965	19	300	172	0.636
Edward T. Flynn	1944–1946	2	18	14	0.562
Taps Gallagher	1931–1943	12	165	89	0.650
William McCarthy	1927–1931	4	44	35	0.557
Pete Dwyer	1923–1927	4	41	30	0.577
John Blake	1919–1923	4	61	14	0.813

* Beilein was hired in March 2019, but resigned in October 2019 without having coached a game; Paulus was named interim head coach in his place.

== Purple Eagles in the NBA or National leagues ==
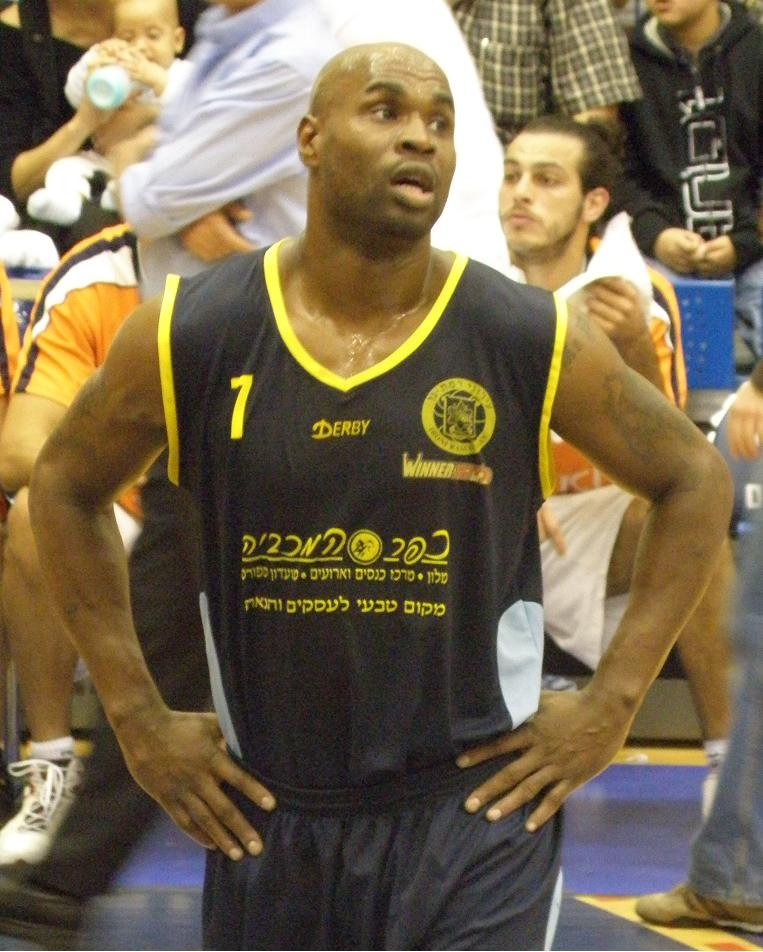
Chris Watson

- Joe Arlauckas
- Al Butler
- T. J. Cline (born 1994), American-Israeli basketball player
- Larry Costello
- Boo Ellis
- Bo Erias
- Ed Fleming
- Sam Iorio (born 1998), American-Israeli basketball player in the Israeli Basketball Premier League
- Manny Leaks
- Juan Mendez
- Calvin Murphy
- Zeke Sinicola
- Joe Smyth
- Andy Walker
- Chris Watson (born 1975), American-Israeli basketball player in the Israeli Premier League, in the Niagara University Hall of Fame
