= Boo Ellis =

American basketball player (1936–2010)

Personal information
- Born: February 11, 1936
- Died: May 6, 2010 (aged 74) Indianapolis, Indiana, U.S.
- Listed height: 6 ft 5 in (1.96 m)
- Listed weight: 185 lb (84 kg)

Career information
- High school: Hamilton (Hamilton, Ohio)
- College: Niagara (1955–1958)
- NBA draft: 1958: 3rd round, 16th overall pick
- Drafted by: Minneapolis Lakers
- Playing career: 1958–1966
- Position: Power forward
- Number: 23, 12, 30

Career history
- 1958–1960: Minneapolis Lakers
- 1960–1962: Wilkes-Barre Barons
- 1962–1963: Allentown Jets
- 1963–1966: Wilmington Blue Bombers

Career highlights
- EPBL champion (1963); EPBL Most Valuable Player (1961); All-EPBL First Team (1961); All-EPBL Second Team (1962); NCAA rebounding leader (1958); No. 3 retired by Niagara Purple Eagles

Career NBA statistics
- Points: 607 (5.1 ppg)
- Rebounds: 616 (5.2 rpg)
- Assists: 86 (0.7 apg)
- Stats at NBA.com
- Stats at Basketball Reference

Alex "Boo" Ellis (February 11, 1936 – May 6, 2010) was an American professional basketball player for the Minneapolis Lakers of the National Basketball Association (NBA). Ellis played in the league for just the 1958–59 and 1959–60 seasons and averaged 5.1 points and 5.2 rebounds per game.

Ellis grew up in Hamilton, Ohio, and attended Hamilton High School. He led the school to 25–3 record and a 1954 state championship as a senior, garnering first team all-state and state tournament MVP honors that year. Ellis then went on to play college basketball for Niagara University.

A 6 ft 5 in (1.96 m), 185 lb. forward/center, he quickly became a dominant force in both scoring and rebounding. Since the rules back then did not allow freshmen to play varsity sports, Ellis had to wait until his sophomore year in 1955–56 to suit up officially for the Purple Eagles. In his three seasons, he accumulated 1,656 points and a still-standing school record 1,533 rebounds. In his first season of eligibility, Ellis grabbed a school single season record 485 rebounds, only to break his own record the next two consecutive years with 522 and 526, respectively. During a game against Kent State in his junior year, he recorded a 31-point, 31-rebound effort. In Ellis' final season, he led NCAA Division I in rebounding and was named the Western New York Athlete of the Year. He also guided the Purple Eagles to two National Invitation Tournament (NIT) berths in his three-year career.

Following his standout collegiate career, the Minneapolis Lakers selected him as the first pick in the third round (16th overall) in the 1958 NBA draft. After two NBA seasons, Ellis played seven seasons in the Eastern Professional Basketball League (EPBL). He won an EPBL championship with the Allentown Jets in 1963. Ellis was selected as the EPBL Most Valuable Player and a member of the All-EPBL First Team in 1961 and to the All-EPBL Second Team in 1962. He also played three seasons with the Marcus Haynes Fabulous Magicians, a traveling professional team. In his later life, Ellis worked as a security guard in his hometown of Hamilton. He spent two and a half years of his life living with his daughter in Indianapolis, before succumbing the effects of a heart attack he had suffered two weeks earlier. Ellis died on May 6, 2010, at age 74.

== Career statistics ==
Legend
GP	Games played	GS	Games started	MPG	Minutes per game
FG%	Field goal percentage	3P%	3-point field goal percentage	FT%	Free throw percentage
RPG	Rebounds per game	APG	Assists per game	SPG	Steals per game
BPG	Blocks per game	PPG	Points per game	**Bold**	Career high
*	Led the league

=== NBA ===
==== Regular season ====
Year	Team	GP	MPG	FG%	FT%	RPG	APG	PPG
1958–59	Minneapolis	**72***	**16.7**	**.430**	**.708**	**5.3**	**.8**	**5.9**
1959–60	Minneapolis	46	14.6	.346	.671	5.1	.6	3.9
Career		118	15.9	.402	.695	5.2	.7	5.1

===== Playoffs =====
Year	Team	GP	MPG	FG%	FT%	RPG	APG	PPG
1959	Minneapolis	**13***	**19.6**	**.438**	**.581**	**7.2**	**1.2**	**6.8**
1960	Minneapolis	3	12.0	.200	.500	4.0	.07	2.7
Career		16	18.2	.411	.564	6.6	1.1	6.0

== See also ==
- List of NCAA Division I men's basketball season rebounding leaders
