= 1958–59 St. Louis Hawks season =

NBA professional basketball team season

- Division champions
- Head coach: Andy Phillip; Ed Macauley
- Arena: Kiel Auditorium

Results
- Record: 49–23 (.681)
- Place: Division: 1st (Western)
- Playoff finish: West Finals (Lost to Lakers 2–4)

The 1958–59 St. Louis Hawks season was the franchise's 13th season in the NBA. Despite winning the NBA Championship, head coach Alex Hannum was replaced by Andy Phillip, and he lasted 10 games before being replaced by Ed Macauley. The Hawks made player changes, including the acquisition of Clyde Lovellette from the Cincinnati Royals. The Hawks won the Western Division with a record of 49 wins and 23 losses. Bob Pettit won his 2nd NBA MVP award as he led the league in scoring with 29.2 points per game.

In the Western Division Finals, the Hawks were defeated by the Minneapolis Lakers in 6 games.

== Roster ==
1958–59 St. Louis Hawks roster
Players

Pos.	No.	Player	Height	Weight	DOB	From
SG	11 – 26	Al Ferrari	6 ft 4 in (1.93 m)	190 lb (86 kg)	1933–07–06	Michigan State
SF	33	Dave Gambee	6 ft 6 in (1.98 m)	215 lb (98 kg)	1937–04–16	Oregon State
PG	17	Si Green	6 ft 2 in (1.88 m)	185 lb (84 kg)	1933–08–20	Duquesne
SF	16	Cliff Hagan	6 ft 4 in (1.93 m)	210 lb (95 kg)	1931–12–09	Kentucky
C	34	Clyde Lovellette	6 ft 9 in (2.06 m)	234 lb (106 kg)	1929–09–07	Kansas
C	20	Ed Macauley	6 ft 8 in (2.03 m)	185 lb (84 kg)	1928–03–22	Saint Louis
PG	22	Slater Martin	5 ft 10 in (1.78 m)	170 lb (77 kg)	1925–10–22	Texas
SG	21	Jack McMahon	6 ft 1 in (1.85 m)	185 lb (84 kg)	1928–12–03	St. John's
SG	17	Med Park	6 ft 2 in (1.88 m)	205 lb (93 kg)	1933–04–11	Missouri
PF	9	Bob Pettit	6 ft 9 in (2.06 m)	205 lb (93 kg)	1932–12–12	LSU
C	12 – 19	Hub Reed	6 ft 9 in (2.06 m)	215 lb (98 kg)	1936–10–04	Oklahoma City
C	13	Chuck Share	6 ft 11 in (2.11 m)	235 lb (107 kg)	1927–03–14	Bowling Green
PG	10 – 15	Win Wilfong	6 ft 2 in (1.88 m)	185 lb (84 kg)	1933–08–13	Memphis

Coaches
Head coach
- Andy Phillip
- Ed Macauley
Assistant(s)

Legend
- (DP) Unsigned draft pick
- (FA) Free agent
- (S) Suspended
- Injured

Roster

== Regular season ==
=== Season standings ===
Western Division	W	L	PCT	GB	Home	Road	Neutral	Div
x-St. Louis Hawks	49	23	.681	–	28–3	14–15	7–5	27–9
x-Minneapolis Lakers	33	39	.458	16	15–7	9–17	9–15	18–18
x-Detroit Pistons	28	44	.389	21	13–17	8–20	7–7	17–19
Cincinnati Royals	19	53	.264	30	9–19	2–25	8–9	10–26

=== Game log ===
1958–59 Game log
#	Date	Opponent	Score	High points	Record
1	October 23	Detroit	103–104	Bob Pettit (23)	1–0
2	October 25	@ Detroit	112–117	Bob Pettit (31)	1–1
3	October 29	@ Minneapolis	112–100	Bob Pettit (37)	2–1
4	November 1	Minneapolis	108–101	Cliff Hagan (28)	2–2
5	November 2	@ Cincinnati	97–90	Bob Pettit (28)	3–2
6	November 8	Boston	84–87	Bob Pettit (29)	4–2
7	November 13	@ New York	102–119	Bob Pettit (28)	4–3
8	November 14	Philadelphia	100–110	Bob Pettit (31)	5–3
9	November 15	Detroit	91–102	Bob Pettit (36)	6–3
10	November 18	Syracuse	120–94	Bob Pettit (21)	6–4
11	November 22	Minneapolis	109–114	Bob Pettit (29)	7–4
12	November 23	@ Cincinnati	100–89	Lovellete, Pettit (24)	8–4
13	November 25	N Philadelphia	105–106	Bob Pettit (36)	8–5
14	November 26	@ Syracuse	112–107	Bob Pettit (31)	9–5
15	November 27	Syracuse	98–107	Bob Pettit (42)	10–5
16	November 29	Cincinnati	86–98	Bob Pettit (25)	11–5
17	December 2	N Cincinnati	105–81	Cliff Hagan (25)	12–5
18	December 3	@ Boston	119–110	Cliff Hagan (39)	13–5
19	December 4	@ Philadelphia	107–92	Cliff Hagan (37)	14–5
20	December 6	Philadelphia	97–107	Hagan, Pettit (29)	15–5
21	December 10	N Detroit	82–89	Cliff Hagan (21)	15–6
22	December 11	N Detroit	101–107	Bob Pettit (27)	15–7
23	December 12	@ New York	104–106	Bob Pettit (27)	15–8
24	December 13	New York	94–108	Bob Pettit (29)	16–8
25	December 17	N New York	136–122	Hagan, Pettit (35)	17–8
26	December 20	@ Detroit	111–104	Cliff Hagan (27)	18–8
27	December 21	Philadelphia	86–98	Clyde Lovellette (27)	19–8
28	December 25	@ Cincinnati	100–92	Hagan, Pettit (27)	20–8
29	December 27	@ Philadelphia	108–114 (OT)	Clyde Lovellette (30)	20–9
30	December 29	Cincinnati	112–124	Bob Pettit (35)	21–9
31	December 30	@ Cincinnati	119–104	Bob Pettit (27)	22–9
32	January 3	Boston	110–116	Bob Pettit (31)	23–9
33	January 4	New York	122–114	Cliff Hagan (34)	23–10
34	January 6	N Minneapolis	112–95	Bob Pettit (38)	24–10
35	January 7	N Minneapolis	89–78	Cliff Hagan (22)	25–10
36	January 8	N Minneapolis	93–95	Bob Pettit (29)	25–11
37	January 9	N Cincinnati	112–101	Bob Pettit (36)	26–11
38	January 11	Detroit	100–111	Bob Pettit (50)	27–11
39	January 13	Minneapolis	95–110	Cliff Hagan (25)	28–11
40	January 14	@ Detroit	114–108	Cliff Hagan (28)	29–11
41	January 16	Syracuse	89–102	Bob Pettit (30)	30–11
42	January 18	@ Boston	117–139	Cliff Hagan (28)	30–12
43	January 20	Boston	114–119	Bob Pettit (52)	31–12
44	January 25	New York	111–115	Bob Pettit (29)	32–12
45	January 27	@ New York	112–111 (OT)	Bob Pettit (34)	33–12
46	January 28	@ Boston	111–120 (OT)	Bob Pettit (40)	33–13
47	January 30	Cincinnati	87–118	Cliff Hagan (30)	34–13
48	January 31	N Minneapolis	120–96	Bob Pettit (26)	35–13
49	February 1	Detroit	96–130	Bob Pettit (40)	36–13
50	February 3	N Boston	97–104	Cliff Hagan (32)	36–14
51	February 4	@ Syracuse	113–111	Clyde Lovellette (30)	37–14
52	February 5	@ Philadelphia	95–106	Hagan, Pettit (23)	37–15
53	February 6	@ Boston	95–122	Hub Reed (19)	37–16
54	February 8	Philadelphia	93–100	Bob Pettit (28)	38–16
55	February 9	N Syracuse	94–99	Bob Pettit (26)	39–16
56	February 12	New York	105–106	Bob Pettit (34)	40–16
57	February 14	Minneapolis	96–139	Cliff Hagan (36)	41–16
58	February 15	@ Minneapolis	98–109	Cliff Hagan (32)	41–17
59	February 17	@ New York	93–112	Bob Pettit (27)	41–18
60	February 21	Cincinnati	120–121	Bob Pettit (34)	42–18
61	February 22	Minneapolis	106–120	Bob Pettit (34)	43–18
62	February 25	@ Detroit	104–100	Bob Pettit (24)	44–18
63	February 26	@ Syracuse	111–130	Bob Pettit (30)	44–19
64	February 27	Syracuse	113–128	Bob Pettit (35)	45–19
65	February 28	@ Cincinnati	122–124 (OT)	Bob Pettit (32)	45–20
66	March 1	Boston	102–104	Bob Pettit (38)	46–20
67	March 3	Cincinnati	102–113	Bob Pettit (28)	47–20
68	March 4	@ Detroit	97–127	Bob Pettit (32)	47–21
69	March 5	@ Philadelphia	101–106	Bob Pettit (24)	47–22
70	March 7	Detroit	128–137	Bob Pettit (40)	48–22
71	March 8	@ Minneapolis	104–120	Bob Pettit (30)	48–23
72	March 11	@ Syracuse	132–130 (OT)	Bob Pettit (27)	49–23

== Playoffs ==
1959 playoff game log
Division Finals: 2–4 (home: 2–1; road: 0–3)

Game	Date	Team	Score	High points	High rebounds	Location Attendance	Series
1	March 21	Minneapolis	W 124–90	Cliff Hagan (40)	—	Kiel Auditorium	1–0
2	March 22	@ Minneapolis	L 98–106	Cliff Hagan (27)	Bob Pettit (7)	Minneapolis Auditorium	1–1
3	March 24	Minneapolis	W 127–97	Bob Pettit (39)	Cliff Hagan (18)	Kiel Auditorium; 9,324	2–1
4	March 26	@ Minneapolis	L 98–108	Cliff Hagan (38)	—	Minneapolis Auditorium	2–2
5	March 28	Minneapolis	L 97–98 (OT)	Bob Pettit (36)	—	Kiel Auditorium	2–3
6	March 29	@ Minneapolis	L 104–106	Bob Pettit (24)	Clyde Lovellette (15)	Minneapolis Auditorium; 10,179	2–4

1959 schedule

== Awards and honors ==
- Bob Pettit, NBA Most Valuable Player Award
- Bob Pettit, All-NBA First Team
- Slater Martin, All-NBA Second Team
- Cliff Hagan, All-NBA Second Team
