= Ed Fleming =

American basketball player

Personal information
- Born: July 25, 1933 Pittsburgh, Pennsylvania, U.S.
- Died: April 10, 2002 (aged 68) Greensburg, Pennsylvania, U.S.
- Listed height: 6 ft 3 in (1.91 m)
- Listed weight: 189 lb (86 kg)

Career information
- High school: Westinghouse (Pittsburgh, Pennsylvania)
- College: Niagara (1951–1955)
- NBA draft: 1955: 3rd round, 16th overall pick
- Drafted by: Rochester Royals
- Playing career: 1955–1964
- Position: Small forward / shooting guard
- Number: 7, 3, 70, 50

Career history
- 1955–1957: Rochester Royals
- 1957–1960: Minneapolis Lakers
- 1959–1962: Wilkes-Barre Barons
- 1963–1964: Sunbury Mercurys

Career highlights
- No. 70 retired by Niagara Purple Eagles

Career NBA statistics
- Points: 2,511 (8.6 ppg)
- Rebounds: 1,532 (5.2 rpg)
- Assists: 544 (1.9 apg)
- Stats at NBA.com
- Stats at Basketball Reference

Edward Rufus Fleming (July 25, 1933 – April 10, 2002) was an American professional basketball player. Fleming was selected in the 1955 NBA draft by the Rochester Royals after a collegiate career at Niagara. Although he played in both the National Basketball Association (NBA) and Eastern Professional Basketball League (EPBL), his career totals for NBA games only are 2,511 points, 1,532 rebounds and 544 assists in five seasons.

== Career statistics ==
Legend
GP	Games played	GS	Games started	MPG	Minutes per game
FG%	Field goal percentage	3P%	3-point field goal percentage	FT%	Free throw percentage
RPG	Rebounds per game	APG	Assists per game	SPG	Steals per game
BPG	Blocks per game	PPG	Points per game	**Bold**	Career high
*	Led the league

=== NBA ===
==== Regular season ====
Year	Team	GP	MPG	FG%	FT%	RPG	APG	PPG
1955–56	Rochester	71	**28.6**	.371	.745	**6.9**	**2.8**	**12.5**
1956–57	Rochester	51	18.2	.299	.728	3.6	1.6	7.0
1957–58	Minneapolis	**72***	23.4	.345	.710	6.8	1.9	8.8
1958–59	Minneapolis	71	15.9	.387	.721	4.0	1.3	6.5
1959–60	Minneapolis	27	15.3	**.418**	**.768**	3.2	1.4	6.8
Career		292	21.2	.359	.731	5.2	1.9	8.6

==== Playoffs ====
Year	Team	GP	MPG	FG%	FT%	RPG	APG	PPG
1959	Minneapolis	**13***	13.7	.351	.880	3.0	1.4	5.8
