= 1960–61 New York Knicks season =

Season of National Basketball Association team the New York Knicks

- Head coach: Carl Braun
- General manager: Vince Boryla
- Arena: Madison Square Garden

Results
- Record: 21–58 (.266)
- Place: Division: 4th (Eastern)
- Playoff finish: Did not qualify
- Stats at Basketball Reference

Local media
- Television: WPIX
- Radio: WINS

The 1960–61 New York Knicks season was the Knicks' 15th season in the NBA.

== Regular season ==
=== Season standings ===
Eastern Division	W	L	PCT	GB	Home	Road	Neutral	Div
x-Boston Celtics	57	22	.722	–	21–7	24–11	12–4	28–11
x-Philadelphia Warriors	46	33	.582	11	23–6	12–21	11–6	22–17
x-Syracuse Nationals	38	41	.481	19	19–9	8–21	11–11	18–21
New York Knicks	21	58	.266	36	10–22	7–25	4–11	10–29

x – clinched playoff spot

=== Game log ===
1960–61 game log
#	Date	Opponent	Score	High points	Record
1	October 20	Cincinnati	L 105–113	Willie Naulls (37)	0–1
2	October 22	@ Cincinnati	L 117–119	Willie Naulls (34)	0–2
3	October 24	@ Los Angeles	W 111–101	Charlie Tyra (22)	1–2
4	October 25	@ Los Angeles	L 118–120	Willie Naulls (33)	1–3
5	October 28	Boston	L 101–110	Willie Naulls (24)	1–4
6	October 29	@ Detroit	L 110–115	Richie Guerin (24)	1–5
7	November 2	vs. Los Angeles	L 96–106	Willie Naulls (19)	1–6
8	November 5	@ St. Louis	L 104–119	Richie Guerin (23)	1–7
9	November 10	Philadelphia	L 112–116 (OT)	Willie Naulls (31)	1–8
10	November 11	Syracuse	W 112–108	Richie Guerin (24)	2–8
11	November 12	@ Syracuse	L 117–128	Willie Naulls (21)	2–9
12	November 15	Los Angeles	L 108–123	Willie Naulls (35)	2–10
13	November 18	Philadelphia	L 99–101	Charlie Tyra (21)	2–11
14	November 19	@ Philadelphia	L 111–121	Willie Naulls (27)	2–12
15	November 22	St. Louis	L 119–120	Willie Naulls (30)	2–13
16	November 23	@ Boston	L 105–122	Willie Naulls (29)	2–14
17	November 25	Boston	L 110–111	Ken Sears (28)	2–15
18	November 26	vs. Detroit	W 127–119	Richie Guerin (35)	3–15
19	November 27	@ Cincinnati	W 122–118 (OT)	Naulls, Sears (18)	4–15
20	November 29	Detroit	W 118–107	Ken Sears (26)	5–15
21	December 1	vs. Boston	W 116–111	Willie Naulls (25)	6–15
22	December 2	St. Louis	L 133–139 (OT)	Willie Naulls (36)	6–16
23	December 3	@ Syracuse	L 113–130	Ken Sears (30)	6–17
24	December 6	Cincinnati	L 112–117	Naulls, Sears (22)	6–18
25	December 8	@ Philadelphia	L 111–114	Richie Guerin (30)	6–19
26	December 13	Boston	W 117–115	Ken Sears (34)	7–19
27	December 14	@ Cincinnati	L 114–121	Richie Guerin (26)	7–20
28	December 16	@ Detroit	W 108–104	Willie Naulls (30)	8–20
29	December 17	@ St. Louis	L 103–116	Willie Naulls (26)	8–21
30	December 20	Syracuse	W 122–112	Willie Naulls (23)	9–21
31	December 21	vs. Philadelphia	L 117–122	Willie Naulls (31)	9–22
32	December 25	@ Syracuse	L 100–162	Naulls, Palmer (21)	9–23
33	December 26	Los Angeles	W 119–112	Richie Guerin (33)	10–23
34	December 28	vs. Cincinnati	L 104–114	Naulls, Sears (21)	10–24
35	December 29	vs. Los Angeles	L 95–111	Willie Naulls (17)	10–25
36	December 30	Boston	L 106–120	Willie Naulls (28)	10–26
37	January 2	@ Philadelphia	L 115–131	Richie Guerin (24)	10–27
38	January 3	Syracuse	L 104–129	Ken Sears (21)	10–28
39	January 5	vs. Detroit	W 104–102	Willie Naulls (22)	11–28
40	January 7	vs. Syracuse	W 120–117	Willie Naulls (28)	12–28
41	January 8	Philadelphia	L 119–121	Willie Naulls (25)	13–28
42	January 10	@ Los Angeles	L 104–117	Willie Naulls (29)	13–29
43	January 11	@ Los Angeles	W 109–104	Richie Guerin (29)	14–29
44	January 13	vs. Syracuse	L 105–106	Willie Naulls (29)	14–30
45	January 15	@ Boston	L 124–142	Willie Naulls (20)	14–31
46	January 19	@ Cincinnati	W 129–122	Dick Garmaker (32)	15–31
47	January 20	@ Detroit	L 128–132	Richie Guerin (35)	15–32
48	January 21	@ St. Louis	L 122–145	Richie Guerin (27)	15–33
49	January 24	Boston	L 112–125	Willie Naulls (25)	15–34
50	January 25	vs. St. Louis	L 109–116	Willie Naulls (24)	15–35
51	January 27	Philadelphia	W 130–119	Richie Guerin (42)	16–35
52	January 28	@ Philadelphia	L 108–114	Willie Naulls (27)	16–36
53	January 31	Syracuse	L 106–122	Dick Garmaker (20)	16–37
54	February 1	vs. Boston	L 120–124	Richie Guerin (29)	16–38
55	February 3	@ Boston	L 109–123	Richie Guerin (28)	16–39
56	February 4	St. Louis	L 111–128	Willie Naulls (19)	16–40
57	February 5	@ Philadelphia	L 128–136 (OT)	Johnny Green (26)	16–41
58	February 7	Detroit	W 131–120	Willie Naulls (49)	17–41
59	February 9	vs. Cincinnati	115–119	Dick Garmaker (29)	17–42
60	February 10	Philadelphia	L 131–133	Dick Garmaker (29)	17–43
61	February 11	@ Boston	W 129–107	Richie Guerin (40)	18–43
62	February 12	Cincinnati	L 104–105	Green, Guerin (24)	18–44
63	February 15	Syracuse	W 129–127 (OT)	Guerin, Naulls (25)	19–44
64	February 16	@ Syracuse	L 120–132	Willie Naulls (31)	19–45
65	February 18	Los Angeles	L 106–121	Phil Jordon (23)	19–46
66	February 19	@ St. Louis	W 123–100	Willie Naulls (24)	20–46
67	February 21	Philadelphia	L 112–114	Jordon, Naulls (25)	20–47
68	February 22	@ Detroit	L 117–123	Richie Guerin (28)	20–48
69	February 24	St. Louis	L 119–121	Dick Garmaker (28)	20–49
70	February 26	@ Syracuse	L 110–136	Willie Naulls (25)	20–50
71	February 28	Boston	L 116–142	Willie Naulls (22)	20–51
72	March 1	vs. Los Angeles	L 107–144	Willie Naulls (35)	20–52
73	March 3	vs. Detroit	L 112–129	Bob McNeill (25)	20–53
74	March 4	@ Boston	L 110–113	Richie Guerin (30)	20–54
75	March 5	Cincinnati	L 118–124	Richie Guerin (30)	20–55
76	March 7	Syracuse	W 114–113	Richie Guerin (32)	21–55
77	March 8	vs. St. Louis	L 94–117	Richie Guerin (20)	21–56
78	March 9	@ Philadelphia	L 126–135	Willie Naulls (41)	21–57
79	March 12	Detroit	L 106–120	Richie Guerin (26)	21–58
