= 1960–61 Philadelphia Warriors season =

NBA professional basketball team season

- Head coach: Neil Johnston
- Arena: Philadelphia Civic Center

Results
- Record: 46–33 (.582)
- Place: Division: 2nd (Eastern)
- Playoff finish: Division semifinals (lost to Nationals 0–3)
- Stats at Basketball Reference

Local media
- Television: WPTZ/WCAU/WFIL
- Radio: WIBG (Bill Campbell)

The 1960–61 Philadelphia Warriors season was the Warriors' 15th season in the NBA.

== Roster ==
1960–61 Philadelphia Warriors roster
Players

Pos.	No.	Player	Height	Weight	DOB	From
F	11	Paul Arizin	6 ft 4 in (1.93 m)	190 lb (86 kg)		Villanova
G	16	Al Attles	6 ft 0 in (1.83 m)	175 lb (79 kg)		North Carolina A&T
C	13	Wilt Chamberlain	7 ft 1 in (2.16 m)	275 lb (125 kg)		Kansas
G/F	7	Ed Conlin	6 ft 5 in (1.96 m)	200 lb (91 kg)		Fordham
G/F	15	Tom Gola	6 ft 6 in (1.98 m)	205 lb (93 kg)		La Salle
F/C	9	Joe Graboski	6 ft 7 in (2.01 m)	195 lb (88 kg)		Tuley HS (IL)
G	52	Vern Hatton	6 ft 3 in (1.91 m)	195 lb (88 kg)		Kentucky
F	12	Andy Johnson	6 ft 5 in (1.96 m)	215 lb (98 kg)		Portland
G	34	Pickles Kennedy	5 ft 11 in (1.80 m)	180 lb (82 kg)		Temple
G	5	Guy Rodgers	6 ft 0 in (1.83 m)	185 lb (84 kg)		Temple
F	17	Joe Ruklick	6 ft 9 in (2.06 m)	220 lb (100 kg)		Northwestern

Coaches
Head coach
- Neil Johnston (Ohio State)

Legend
- (DP) Unsigned draft pick
- (FA) Free agent
- (S) Suspended
- Injured

== Regular season ==
=== Season standings ===
Eastern Division	W	L	PCT	GB	Home	Road	Neutral	Div
x-Boston Celtics	57	22	.722	–	21–7	24–11	12–4	28–11
x-Philadelphia Warriors	46	33	.582	11	23–6	12–21	11–6	22–17
x-Syracuse Nationals	38	41	.481	19	19–9	8–21	11–11	18–21
New York Knicks	21	58	.266	36	10–22	7–25	4–11	10–29

x – clinched playoff spot

=== Game log ===
1960–61 game log
#	Date	Opponent	Score	High points	Record
1	October 22	@ Syracuse	W 133–123	Wilt Chamberlain (42)	1–0
2	October 28	Los Angeles	W 122–120	Wilt Chamberlain (29)	2–0
3	October 29	@ Boston	W 131–103	Paul Arizin (28)	3–0
4	November 1	@ Cincinnati	W 131–113	Wilt Chamberlain (33)	4–0
5	November 4	Detroit	W 136–121	Wilt Chamberlain (44)	5–0
6	November 5	vs. Detroit	W 130–123	Wilt Chamberlain (32)	6–0
7	November 9	vs. Los Angeles	W 125–118	Wilt Chamberlain (46)	7–0
8	November 10	@ New York	W 116–112 (OT)	Paul Arizin (33)	8–0
9	November 11	St. Louis	W 117–112	Wilt Chamberlain (37)	9–0
10	November 12	@ St. Louis	L 105–107	Wilt Chamberlain (42)	9–1
11	November 15	@ Cincinnati	L 115–124	Wilt Chamberlain (36)	9–2
12	November 16	@ Detroit	L 118–119	Wilt Chamberlain (41)	9–3
13	November 17	Syracuse	L 105–106	Wilt Chamberlain (45)	9–4
14	November 18	@ New York	W 101–99	Wilt Chamberlain (34)	10–4
15	November 19	New York	L 111–121	Wilt Chamberlain (40)	11–4
16	November 24	Boston	L 129–132	Wilt Chamberlain (34)	11–5
17	November 26	Cincinnati	W 138–108	Wilt Chamberlain (46)	12–5
18	November 27	@ Los Angeles	W 113–106	Wilt Chamberlain (41)	13–5
19	November 28	@ Los Angeles	L 112–137	Wilt Chamberlain (43)	13–6
20	November 29	vs. Los Angeles	W 122–121	Wilt Chamberlain (44)	14–6
21	December 1	Los Angeles	W 117–114	Wilt Chamberlain (41)	15–6
22	December 3	St. Louis	L 127–131	Wilt Chamberlain (35)	15–7
23	December 6	vs. Syracuse	W 113–107	Arizin, Chamberlain (31)	16–7
24	December 8	New York	W 114–111	Wilt Chamberlain (46)	17–7
25	December 10	Boston	W 102–97	Wilt Chamberlain (34)	18–7
26	December 11	@ Syracuse	L 121–132	Arizin, Chamberlain (31)	18–8
27	December 13	vs. Detroit	W 110–108	Wilt Chamberlain (36)	19–8
28	December 14	@ Detroit	L 126–134	Wilt Chamberlain (30)	19–9
29	December 16	vs. St. Louis	L 112–107	Wilt Chamberlain (34)	19–10
30	December 18	@ Cincinnati	W 128–112	Wilt Chamberlain (32)	20–10
31	December 21	vs. New York	W 122–117	Wilt Chamberlain (33)	21–10
32	December 26	@ Boston	L 115–119	Wilt Chamberlain (30)	21–11
33	December 27	Boston	W 116–101	Wilt Chamberlain (39)	22–11
34	December 29	Cincinnati	W 128–124	Wilt Chamberlain (27)	23–11
35	December 30	vs. Cincinnati	L 130–136	Wilt Chamberlain (49)	23–12
36	January 2	New York	W 131–115	Wilt Chamberlain (56)	24–12
37	January 3	vs. Detroit	W 128–125 (OT)	Wilt Chamberlain (46)	25–12
38	January 5	Syracuse	W 139–127	Wilt Chamberlain (56)	26–12
39	January 8	@ New York	L 119–121	Wilt Chamberlain (38)	26–13
40	January 12	St. Louis	W 111–102	Wilt Chamberlain (37)	27–13
41	January 13	@ Boston	L 121–123 (OT)	Wilt Chamberlain (30)	27–14
42	January 14	Boston	W 116–113	Wilt Chamberlain (44)	28–14
43	January 15	@ Syracuse	L 113–116	Wilt Chamberlain (24)	28–15
44	January 18	vs. Syracuse	L 118–129	Wilt Chamberlain (48)	28–16
45	January 19	St. Louis	W 129–127	Wilt Chamberlain (39)	29–16
46	January 21	Los Angeles	W 136–111	Wilt Chamberlain (56)	30–16
47	January 22	@ Detroit	L 128–136	Wilt Chamberlain (28)	30–17
48	January 24	@ St. Louis	L 112–114	Paul Arizin (26)	30–18
49	January 26	Boston	L 129–121	Guy Rodgers (33)	30–19
50	January 27	@ New York	L 119–130	Paul Arizin (29)	30–20
51	January 28	New York	W 114–108	Joe Graboski (29)	31–20
52	January 29	@ Boston	L 115–128	Wilt Chamberlain (46)	31–21
53	February 1	@ Syracuse	W 122–113	Wilt Chamberlain (30)	32–21
54	February 2	Cincinnati	W 133–118	Wilt Chamberlain (45)	33–21
55	February 3	vs. Cincinnati	W 136–135	Wilt Chamberlain (52)	34–21
56	February 5	New York	W 136–128 (OT)	Wilt Chamberlain (55)	35–21
57	February 7	@ St. Louis	L 124–127	Wilt Chamberlain (37)	35–22
58	February 8	@ Detroit	L 123–125	Wilt Chamberlain (42)	35–23
59	February 9	Syracuse	L 126–136	Wilt Chamberlain (46)	35–24
60	February 10	@ New York	W 133–131	Wilt Chamberlain (48)	36–24
61	February 12	@ Boston	L 125–136	Wilt Chamberlain (46)	36–25
62	February 15	vs. St. Louis	L 98–135	Wilt Chamberlain (28)	36–26
63	February 16	vs. Boston	W 121–111	Wilt Chamberlain (34)	37–26
64	February 17	Boston	L 128–133	Paul Arizin (49)	37–27
65	February 18	vs. Syracuse	L 110–129	Wilt Chamberlain (30)	37–28
66	February 21	@ New York	W 114–112	Wilt Chamberlain (39)	38–28
67	February 22	vs. Cincinnati	W 132–131	Wilt Chamberlain (41)	39–28
68	February 23	Detroit	W 129–121	Wilt Chamberlain (49)	40–28
69	February 25	@ Cincinnati	W 129–120	Wilt Chamberlain (58)	41–28
70	February 26	@ Los Angeles	L 116–121	Wilt Chamberlain (34)	41–29
71	February 27	@ Los Angeles	W 113–88	Wilt Chamberlain (35)	42–29
72	February 28	Los Angeles	W 123–108	Wilt Chamberlain (32)	43–29
73	March 1	@ Syracuse	L 128–149	Wilt Chamberlain (56)	43–30
74	March 3	vs. Syracuse	W 123–116	Wilt Chamberlain (47)	44–30
75	March 4	Syracuse	W 116–115	Wilt Chamberlain (33)	45–30
76	March 5	@ Boston	L 129–146	Wilt Chamberlain (47)	45–31
77	March 9	New York	W 135–126	Wilt Chamberlain (67)	46–31
78	March 10	vs. Detroit	L 103–120	Wilt Chamberlain (32)	46–32
79	March 11	@ St. Louis	L 87–130	Paul Arizin (21)	46–33

== Playoffs ==
1961 playoff game log
Division semifinals: 0–3 (home: 0–2; road: 0–1)

Game	Date	Team	Score	High points	High rebounds	High assists	Location Attendance	Series
1	March 14	Syracuse	L 107–115	Wilt Chamberlain (46)	Wilt Chamberlain (32)	Tom Gola (7)	Philadelphia Civic Center; 4,391	0–1
2	March 16	@ Syracuse	L 114–115	Wilt Chamberlain (32)	Wilt Chamberlain (14)	Arizin, Attles (5)	Onondaga War Memorial; 5,304	0–2
3	March 18	Syracuse	L 103–106	Wilt Chamberlain (33)	Wilt Chamberlain (23)	Gola, Rodgers (5)	Philadelphia Civic Center	0–3

1961 schedule

== Awards and records ==
- Wilt Chamberlain, NBA All-Star Game
- Paul Arizin, NBA All-Star Game
- Tom Gola, NBA All-Star Game
- Wilt Chamberlain, NBA Scoring Champion
- Wilt Chamberlain, All-NBA First Team
