= 1961 NBA Finals =

1961 basketball championship series

Team	Coach	Wins
Boston Celtics	Red Auerbach	4
St. Louis Hawks	Paul Seymour	1
- Dates: April 2–11
- Hall of Famers: Celtics: Bob Cousy (1971); Bill Russell (1975); Bill Sharman (1976); Frank Ramsey (1982); Sam Jones (1984); Tom Heinsohn (1986 as player, 2015 as coach); K. C. Jones (1989); Satch Sanders (2011, contributor); Hawks: Bob Pettit (1971); Cliff Hagan (1978); Clyde Lovellette (1988); Lenny Wilkens (1989); Coaches: Red Auerbach (1969)
- Eastern finals: Celtics defeated Nationals, 4–1
- Western finals: Hawks defeated Lakers, 4–3

The 1961 NBA World Championship Series was the championship series of the 1961 NBA playoffs, which concluded the National Basketball Association (NBA)'s 1960–61 season in North America. The best-of-seven series was played between the Western Division champion St. Louis Hawks and the Eastern Division champion Boston Celtics. This was the fourth and final World Championship Series meeting between the two teams, and was the fifth meeting between teams from Boston and St. Louis for a major professional sports championship. It was also the Celtics' fifth straight trip to the championship series, and they won the series against the Hawks, 4–1.

As of 2026, this remains the Hawks’ (Note: The Hawks franchise relocated to Atlanta for the 1968–69 season.) last appearance in the NBA Finals, the second-longest drought behind the Kings franchise who last played in the NBA Finals in 1951.

== Series summary ==
Game	Date	Home team	Result	Road team
Game 1	April 2	Boston Celtics	129–95 (1–0)	St. Louis Hawks
Game 2	April 5	Boston Celtics	116–108 (2–0)	St. Louis Hawks
Game 3	April 8	St. Louis Hawks	124–120 (1–2)	Boston Celtics
Game 4	April 9	St. Louis Hawks	104–119 (1–3)	Boston Celtics
Game 5	April 11	Boston Celtics	121–112 (4–1)	St. Louis Hawks

Celtics win series 4–1

== Team rosters ==
=== Boston Celtics ===
1960–61 Boston Celtics roster
Players

Pos.	No.	Player	Height	Weight	DOB	From
F/C	17	Gene Conley	6 ft 8 in (2.03 m)	225 lb (102 kg)		Washington State
G	14	Bob Cousy	6 ft 1 in (1.85 m)	175 lb (79 kg)		Holy Cross
F	20	Gene Guarilia	6 ft 5 in (1.96 m)	220 lb (100 kg)		George Washington
F	15	Tom Heinsohn	6 ft 7 in (2.01 m)	218 lb (99 kg)		Holy Cross
G	25	K. C. Jones	6 ft 1 in (1.85 m)	200 lb (91 kg)		San Francisco
G/F	24	Sam Jones	6 ft 4 in (1.93 m)	198 lb (90 kg)		North Carolina Central
F	18	Jim Loscutoff	6 ft 5 in (1.96 m)	220 lb (100 kg)		Oregon
G/F	23	Frank Ramsey	6 ft 3 in (1.91 m)	190 lb (86 kg)		Kentucky
C	6	Bill Russell	6 ft 10 in (2.08 m)	215 lb (98 kg)		San Francisco
F	16	Satch Sanders	6 ft 6 in (1.98 m)	210 lb (95 kg)		NYU
G	21	Bill Sharman	6 ft 1 in (1.85 m)	175 lb (79 kg)		USC

Coaches
Head coach
- Red Auerbach

Legend
- (DP) Unsigned draft pick
- (FA) Free agent
- (S) Suspended
- Injured

=== St. Louis Hawks ===
1960–61 St. Louis Hawks roster
Players

Pos.	No.	Player	Height	Weight	DOB	From
SG	11	Al Ferrari	6 ft 4 in (1.93 m)	190 lb (86 kg)	1933–07–06	Michigan State
C	13	Larry Foust	6 ft 9 in (2.06 m)	215 lb (98 kg)	1928–06–24	La Salle
PG	17	Si Green	6 ft 2 in (1.88 m)	185 lb (84 kg)	1933–08–20	Duquesne
SF	16	Cliff Hagan	6 ft 4 in (1.93 m)	210 lb (95 kg)	1931–12–09	Kentucky
SF	19	Fred LaCour	6 ft 5 in (1.96 m)	210 lb (95 kg)	1938-02-07	San Francisco
C	34	Clyde Lovellette	6 ft 9 in (2.06 m)	234 lb (106 kg)	1929–09–07	Kansas
SG	15	Johnny McCarthy	6 ft 1 in (1.85 m)	185 lb (84 kg)	1934–04–25	Canisius
PF	9	Bob Pettit	6 ft 9 in (2.06 m)	205 lb (93 kg)	1932–12–12	LSU
SG	25	Dave Piontek	6 ft 6 in (1.98 m)	230 lb (104 kg)	1934–08–27	Xavier
PF	21	Woody Sauldsberry	6 ft 7 in (2.01 m)	220 lb (100 kg)	1934-07-11	Texas Southern
PG	32	Lenny Wilkens	6 ft 1 in (1.85 m)	180 lb (82 kg)	1937-10-28	Providence

Coaches
Head coach

Paul Seymour

Legend
- (DP) Unsigned draft pick
- (FA) Free agent
- (S) Suspended
- Injured

Roster

== Box scores ==
April 2

Boxscore

St. Louis Hawks 95, Boston Celtics 129
Scoring by quarter: 26–30, 22–26, 25–35, 22–38
Pts: Cliff Hagan 33; Rebs: Cliff Hagan 13; Asts: Hagan, Sauldsberry 4 each	Pts: Tom Heinsohn 26; Rebs: Bill Russell 31; Asts: Bob Cousy 7
Boston leads series, 1–0

Boston Garden, Boston, Massachusetts
Attendance: 11,531

April 5

Boxscore

St. Louis Hawks 108, Boston Celtics 116
Scoring by quarter: 32–27, 20–26, 23–31, 33–32
Pts: Cliff Hagan 40; Rebs: Bob Pettit 19; Asts: Cliff Hagan 6	Pts: Bob Cousy 26; Rebs: Bill Russell 28; Asts: Bob Cousy 14
Boston leads series, 2–0

Boston Garden, Boston, Massachusetts
Attendance: 13,909

April 8

Boxscore

Boston Celtics 120, St. Louis Hawks 124
Scoring by quarter: 31–28, 35–38, 31–32, 23–26
Pts: Russell, Heinsohn 24 each Rebs: Bill Russell 23; Asts: Bill Russell 9	Pts: Bob Pettit 31; Rebs: Bob Pettit 24; Asts: Si Green 7
Boston leads series, 2–1

Kiel Auditorium, St. Louis, Missouri
Attendance: 8,468

April 9

Boxscore

Boston Celtics 119, St. Louis Hawks 104
Scoring by quarter: 28–31, 24–25, 39–26, 28–22
Pts: Cousy, Sanders 22 each Rebs: Bill Russell 24; Asts: Bob Cousy 12	Pts: Bob Pettit 40; Rebs: Bob Pettit 18; Asts: Cliff Hagan 7
Boston leads series, 3–1

Kiel Auditorium, St. Louis, Missouri
Attendance: 10,442

April 11

Boxscore

St. Louis Hawks 112, Boston Celtics 121
Scoring by quarter: 39–33, 22–29, 23–37, 28–22
Pts: Bob Pettit 24; Rebs: Pettit, Sauldsberry 11 each Asts: Johnny McCarthy 6	Pts: Bill Russell 30; Rebs: Bill Russell 38; Asts: Bob Cousy 12
Boston wins series, 4–1

Boston Garden, Boston, Massachusetts
Attendance: 13,909

In Bill Sharman's final NBA game, the Celtics closed out the championship.

== See also ==
- 1961 NBA playoffs
- 1960–61 NBA season
