= George Lee (basketball) =

American basketball player and coach

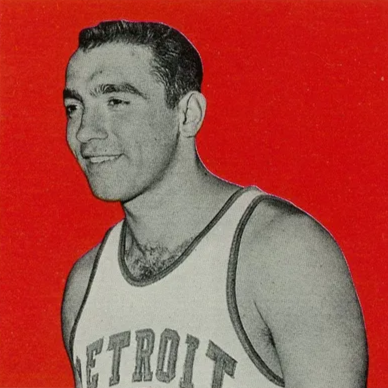
- Lee with the Detroit Pistons c. 1961

Personal information
- Born: November 23, 1936 (age 89) Highland Park, Michigan, U.S.
- Listed height: 6 ft 4 in (1.93 m)
- Listed weight: 200 lb (91 kg)

Career information
- High school: Highland Park (Highland Park, Michigan)
- College: Michigan (1956–1959)
- NBA draft: 1959: 4th round, 24th overall pick
- Drafted by: Detroit Pistons
- Playing career: 1960–1968
- Position: Small forward / shooting guard
- Number: 12, 9
- Coaching career: 1968–1970

Career history

Playing
- 1960–1962: Detroit Pistons
- 1962–1968: San Francisco Warriors

Coaching
- 1968–1970: San Francisco Warriors

Career NBA statistics
- Points: 2,229 (7.5 ppg)
- Rebounds: 1,235 (4.2 rpg)
- Assists: 258 (0.9 apg)
- Stats at NBA.com
- Stats at Basketball Reference

George C. Lee (born November 23, 1936) is a retired American basketball player and coach. A 6 ft 4 in (1.93 m) forward/guard from the University of Michigan, Lee was selected by the Detroit Pistons in the fourth round of the 1959 NBA draft. He had a seven-year career in the NBA, playing two seasons with the Pistons and five with the San Francisco Warriors.

He retired from playing in 1968, and coached the Warriors for the next two seasons, before being replaced by Al Attles in 1970.

== Career playing statistics ==
Legend
GP	Games played	GS	Games started	MPG	Minutes per game
FG%	Field goal percentage	3P%	3-point field goal percentage	FT%	Free throw percentage
RPG	Rebounds per game	APG	Assists per game	SPG	Steals per game
BPG	Blocks per game	PPG	Points per game	**Bold**	Career high

=== NBA ===
==== Regular season ====
Year	Team	GP	MPG	FG%	FT%	RPG	APG	PPG
1960–61	Detroit	74	**23.4**	.399	.701	**6.6**	**1.2**	**12.1**
1961–62	Detroit	**75**	18.0	.358	.761	4.7	.9	7.6
1962–63	San Francisco	64	18.6	.378	.788	3.4	1.0	7.0
1963–64	San Francisco	54	9.7	.379	.662	1.8	.5	3.2
1964–65	San Francisco	19	13.0	.351	.731	2.9	.6	4.8
1966–67	San Francisco	1	5.0	**.750**	**.857**	.0	.0	12.0
1967–68	San Francisco	10	10.6	.229	.708	2.7	.4	3.3
Career		297	17.4	.379	.734	4.2	.9	7.5

==== Playoffs ====
Year	Team	GP	MPG	FG%	FT%	RPG	APG	PPG
1961	Detroit	5	**27.0**	.414	.741	**6.8**	**2.8**	**15.6**
1962	Detroit	6	8.3	**.500**	**.857**	1.3	.2	4.3
1964	San Francisco	**10**	6.7	.450	.600	1.6	.4	3.0
Career		21	12.0	.436	.704	2.8	.9	6.4

== Head coaching record ==
Legend
Regular season	G	Games coached	W	Games won	L	Games lost	W–L %	Win–loss %
Playoffs	PG	Playoff games	PW	Playoff wins	PL	Playoff losses	PW–L %	Playoff win–loss %

=== NBA ===
Team	Year	G	W	L	W–L%	Finish	PG	PW	PL	PW–L%	Result
San Francisco	1968–69	82	41	41	.500	3rd in Western	6	2	4	.333	Lost in Division semifinals
San Francisco	1969–70	52	22	30	.423	(fired)	—	—	—	—	Missed Playoffs
Career		134	63	71	.470		6	2	4	.333	

== See also ==
- University of Michigan Athletic Hall of Honor
