= 1960–61 Detroit Pistons season =

NBA team season

- Head coach: Dick McGuire
- General manager: Nick Kerbawy
- Owner: Fred Zollner
- Arena: Detroit Olympia

Results
- Record: 34–45 (.430)
- Place: Division: 3rd (Western)
- Playoff finish: West Division Semifinals (eliminated 2–3)
- Stats at Basketball Reference

The 1960–61 Detroit Pistons season was the Detroit Pistons' 13th season in the NBA and fourth season in the city of Detroit. The team played home games at Olympia Stadium.

The Pistons finished 34-45 (.430), 3rd in the Western Division. The team advanced to the playoffs, losing to the Los Angeles Lakers 3–2 as Laker Elgin Baylor dominated the series with a 39.4 ppg average in the series. Detroit was led on the season by forward Bailey Howell (23.6 ppg, 14.4 rpg, NBA All-Star), center Walter Dukes (11.7 ppg, 14.1 rpg, NBA All-Star) and guard Gene Shue (22.6 ppg, 6.8 apg, NBA All-Star).

The 1960-61 Detroit Pistons were an offensive minded team, finishing their season at 2nd overall in Offensive Rating in the 1960-61 NBA season, which included eight NBA teams. However, Detroit had one of the poorer defenses in the NBA, ranking 6th overall in Defensive Rating.

Detroit ranked 6th overall in field goal attempts and 4th overall in field goal percentage and Effective Field Goal Percentage. The high-powered 1960-61 Pistons offense relied heavily on the free throw, ranking 1st in free throw attempt rate and free throws per field goal percentage.

The 1960-61 Pistons had a slightly more successful season than their previous year, winning 4 more games than the 1959-1960 season. However, Detroit still ended the year with the same number of losses as the 1959-60 season. This is because the NBA expanded their schedule from 75 to 79 games in the 1960-61 season, so the Pistons played four more games than the 1959-1960 season.

Although the Pistons had a 34-45 (.430) losing record, they still made it to the 1961 NBA playoffs where they played the Los Angeles Lakers. The Lakers hosted the first two games of the series, beating the Pistons 120–102 on March 14, 1961, and 127–118 on March 15th. The Pistons were able to tie the series after beating the Lakers twice in Detroit with scores of 124–113 on March 17 and 123–114 on March 18. The March 17th victory was bolstered by a defensive assignment switch which placed Walter Dukes on Laker's star, Elgin Baylor. Baylor, who had averaged 44.5 points in the first two games in Los Angeles, was held to 26 points with only 10 of those points coming in the second half. The Pistons lost to the Lakers in the final game of the series 137–120, and were eliminated from the playoffs.

== Regular season ==
=== Season standings ===
Western Division	W	L	PCT	GB	Home	Road	Neutral	Div
x-St. Louis Hawks	51	28	.646	–	29–5	15–20	7–3	25–14
x-Los Angeles Lakers	36	43	.456	15	16–12	8–20	12–11	19–20
x-Detroit Pistons	34	45	.430	17	20–11	3–19	11–15	18–21
Cincinnati Royals	33	46	.418	18	18–13	8–19	7–14	16–23

x – clinched playoff spot

=== Regular season by month ===
October 1960: The Detroit Pistons had a record of 2-1 through 3 games in October.

- Points Per Game Leader: Gene Shue (25.3)
- Assists Per Game Leader: Gene Shue (1)
- Rebounds Per Game Leader: Bailey Howell (6)

November 1960: The Detroit Pistons had a record of 5-11 through 16 games in November.

- Points Per Game Leader: Bailey Howell (22.9)
- Assists Per Game Leader: Gene Shue (3.1)
- Rebounds Per Game Leader: Bailey Howell (10.4)

December 1960: The Detroit Pistons had a record of 7-7 through 14 games in December.

- Points Per Game Leader: Bailey Howell (27.1)
- Assists Per Game Leader: Gene Shue (2)
- Rebounds Per Game Leader: Bailey Howell (13)

January 1961: The Detroit Pistons had a record of 11-10 through 21 games in January.

- Points Per Game Leader: Gene Shue (23.3)
- Assists Per Game Leader: Gene Shue (3.4)
- Rebounds Per Game Leader: Walter Dukes (9.4)

February 1961: The Detroit Pistons had a record of 5-12 through 17 games in February.

- Points Per Game Leader: Gene Shue (22.4)
- Assists Per Game Leader: Gene Shue (1.9)
- Rebounds Per Game Leader: Bailey Howell (4.8)

March 1961: The Detroit Pistons had a record of 4-4 through 8 games in March.

- Points Per Game Leader: Bailey Howell (24.5)
- Assists Per Game Leader: Chuck Noble (1.1)
- Rebounds Per Game Leader: Bailey Howell (6.1)

=== Game log ===
1960–61 Game log
#	Date	Opponent	Score	High points	Record
1	October 22	@ Boston	L 116–118	Bailey Howell (27)	0–1
2	October 26	Cincinnati	W 131–117	Gene Shue (30)	1–1
3	October 29	New York	W 115–110	Bailey Howell (23)	2–1
4	November 2	St. Louis	L 117–132	Gene Shue (18)	2–2
5	November 4	@ Philadelphia	L 121–136	Don Ohl (24)	2–3
6	November 5	vs. Philadelphia	L 123–130	Howell, Shue (27)	2–4
7	November 9	@ St. Louis	L 120–126	Gene Shue (20)	2–5
8	November 12	Cincinnati	W 116–112	Gene Shue (31)	3–5
9	November 13	@ Cincinnati	W 125–113	Don Ohl (31)	4–5
10	November 15	vs. Boston	W 115–114 (OT)	Gene Shue (26)	5–5
11	November 16	Philadelphia	W 119–118	Bailey Howell (30)	6–5
12	November 17	vs. St. Louis	L 105–112	Gene Shue (25)	6–6
13	November 19	@ Los Angeles	L 122–130	Walter Dukes (32)	6–7
14	November 20	vs. Los Angeles	L 131–135	Bailey Howell (36)	6–8
15	November 23	Syracuse	W 122–115	Gene Shue (24)	7–8
16	November 25	Los Angeles	L 128–141 (OT)	Bailey Howell (43)	7–9
17	November 26	vs. New York	L 119–127	Bailey Howell (28)	7–10
18	November 29	@ New York	L 107–118	Bailey Howell (25)	7–11
19	November 30	Boston	L 110–125	Jackie Moreland (22)	7–12
20	December 4	vs. Cincinnati	W 116–115	Bailey Howell (31)	8–12
21	December 6	@ St. Louis	L 110–146	Bailey Howell (18)	8–13
22	December 7	St. Louis	W 113–83	Bailey Howell (25)	9–13
23	December 10	Syracuse	L 107–117	Ohl, Shue (19)	9–14
24	December 13	vs. Philadelphia	L 108–110	Gene Shue (25)	9–15
25	December 14	Philadelphia	W 134–126	Bailey Howell (38)	10–15
26	December 16	New York	L 104–108	Bailey Howell (30)	10–16
27	December 19	vs. Los Angeles	L 103–107	Gene Shue (30)	10–17
28	December 20	vs. Los Angeles	W 97–94	Bailey Howell (31)	11–17
29	December 24	@ Boston	L 106–150	Bailey Howell (18)	11–18
30	December 25	@ Cincinnati	L 119–126	Bailey Howell (30)	11–19
31	December 26	Cincinnati	W 137–132	Gene Shue (33)	12–19
32	December 29	St. Louis	W 112–89	Bailey Howell (31)	13–19
33	December 30	vs. Syracuse	W 121–112	Bailey Howell (33)	14–19
34	January 1	Los Angeles	W 116–105	Bailey Howell (26)	15–19
35	January 2	vs. Los Angeles	L 113–123	Don Ohl (25)	15–20
36	January 3	vs. Philadelphia	L 125–128 (OT)	George Lee (26)	15–21
37	January 5	vs. New York	L 102–104	Bailey Howell (19)	15–22
38	January 6	Boston	L 102–108	Shellie McMillon (20)	15–23
39	January 8	@ Syracuse	L 115–138	Gene Shue (24)	15–24
40	January 10	vs. Boston	L 98–118	Ferry, Shue (17)	15–25
41	January 11	Cincinnati	W 126–122	Gene Shue (32)	16–25
42	January 12	vs. Cincinnati	W 124–112	Bailey Howell (33)	17–25
43	January 14	@ St. Louis	L 113–135	Gene Shue (24)	17–26
44	January 15	St. Louis	W 137–122	Don Ohl (25)	18–26
45	January 18	vs. Cincinnati	W 144–128	Gene Shue (41)	19–26
46	January 20	New York	W 132–128	Bailey Howell (29)	20–26
47	January 21	vs. Cincinnati	W 130–106	Bailey Howell (29)	21–26
48	January 22	Philadelphia	W 136–128	Gene Shue (32)	22–26
49	January 24	@ Cincinnati	W 106–104	Bailey Howell (29)	23–26
50	January 25	Cincinnati	W 138–125	Gene Shue (24)	24–26
51	January 27	@ Boston	L 111–140	Dukes, Howell (18)	24–27
52	January 29	@ Los Angeles	L 113–137	Gene Shue (21)	24–28
53	January 30	@ Los Angeles	L 116–117	Bailey Howell (27)	24–29
54	January 31	vs. Los Angeles	W 121–112	Gene Shue (26)	25–29
55	February 1	vs. St. Louis	L 131–137	Don Ohl (22)	25–30
56	February 3	Syracuse	W 121–118	Bailey Howell (26)	26–30
57	February 4	vs. Syracuse	W 111–104	Gene Shue (31)	27–30
58	February 5	Los Angeles	L 120–125	Bailey Howell (34)	27–31
59	February 7	@ New York	L 120–131	Don Ohl (33)	27–32
60	February 8	Philadelphia	W 125–123	Gene Shue (28)	28–32
61	February 10	Boston	W 137–134	Gene Shue (35)	29–32
62	February 11	vs. Syracuse	L 111–141	Gene Shue (21)	29–33
63	February 12	@ Syracuse	L 122–148	Bob Ferry (25)	29–34
64	February 14	@ St. Louis	L 134–135	George Lee (31)	29–35
65	February 16	Los Angeles	L 106–129	Bob Ferry (25)	29–36
66	February 17	vs. Syracuse	L 113–115	Bob Ferry (31)	29–37
67	February 18	St. Louis	L 138–141	Bob Ferry (39)	29–38
68	February 21	vs. Syracuse	L 118–123	Gene Shue (35)	29–39
69	February 22	New York	W 123–117	Gene Shue (29)	30–39
70	February 23	@ Philadelphia	L 121–129	Bob Ferry (29)	30–40
71	February 26	Boston	L 99–113	Bailey Howell (17)	30–41
72	March 1	@ Cincinnati	L 122–137	Don Ohl (33)	30–42
73	March 3	vs. New York	W 129–112	George Lee (30)	31–42
74	March 4	@ St. Louis	L 102–104	Gene Shue (29)	31–43
75	March 5	St. Louis	L 122–127	Bailey Howell (30)	31–44
76	March 8	Los Angeles	W 120–103	Bailey Howell (28)	32–44
77	March 9	vs. Boston	L 118–119	Gene Shue (30)	32–45
78	March 10	vs. Philadelphia	W 120–103	Bailey Howell (35)	33–45
79	March 12	@ New York	W 120–106	Howell, Lee (24)	34–45

== Playoffs ==
1961 playoff game log
Division Semifinals: 2–3 (home: 2–0; road: 0–3)

Game	Date	Team	Score	High points	High rebounds	Location Attendance	Series
1	March 14	@ Los Angeles	L 102–120	Gene Shue (20)	Walter Dukes (11)	Los Angeles Memorial Sports Arena	0–1
2	March 15	@ Los Angeles	L 118–127	McMillon, Shue (24)	Walter Dukes (12)	Los Angeles Memorial Sports Arena; 4,253	0–2
3	March 17	Los Angeles	W 124–113	Bob Ferry (30)	—	Detroit Olympia; 3,422	1–2
4	March 18	Los Angeles	W 123–114	Gene Shue (29)	—	Detroit Olympia	2–2
5	March 19	@ Los Angeles	L 120–137	Bob Ferry (25)	Bob Ferry (16)	Los Angeles Memorial Sports Arena; 3,705	2–3

1961 schedule

== Awards and records ==
- Gene Shue, All-NBA Second Team
