= Gene Conley =

American baseball player (1930–2017)

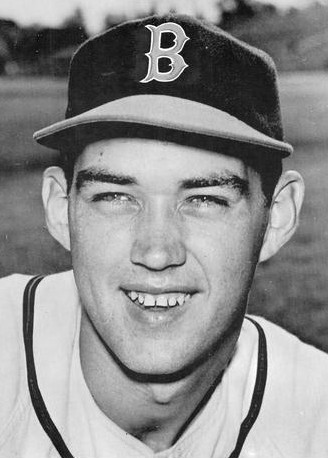
- Conley in 1961
- Pitcher
- Born: November 10, 1930; Muskogee, Oklahoma, U.S.
- Died: July 4, 2017 (aged 86); Foxborough, Massachusetts, U.S.
- Batted: Right Threw: Right

MLB debut
- April 17, 1952, for the Boston Braves

Last MLB appearance
- September 21, 1963, for the Boston Red Sox

MLB statistics
- Win–loss record: 91–96
- Earned run average: 3.82
- Strikeouts: 888
- Stats at Baseball Reference

Teams
- Boston / Milwaukee Braves (1952, 1954–1958); Philadelphia Phillies (1959–1960); Boston Red Sox (1961–1963)

Career highlights and awards
- 4× All-Star (1954, 1955, 1959, 1959²); World Series champion (1957)
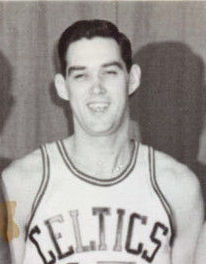
Basketball career
Gene Conley with the 1960 Boston Celtics
Personal information
Listed height	6 ft 8 in (2.03 m)
Listed weight	225 lb (102 kg)
Career information
High school	Richland (Richland, Washington)
College	Washington State (1949–1950)
NBA draft	1952: 10th round, 90th overall pick
Drafted by	Boston Celtics
Playing career	1952–1969
Position	Center / power forward
Number	17, 5
Career history
Playing
1952–1953, 1958–1961	Boston Celtics
1961–1962	Washington Tapers
1962–1964	New York Knicks
1966–1968	Hartford Capitols
1968–1969	New Haven Elms
Career highlights
3× NBA champion (1959–1961); All-EPBL Second Team (1968)
Career NBA statistics
Points	2,069
Rebounds	2,212
Assists	201
Stats at NBA.com
Stats at Basketball Reference

Donald Eugene Conley (November 10, 1930 – July 4, 2017) was an American professional baseball and basketball player. He pitched for four teams in Major League Baseball (MLB) from 1952 to 1963. Conley also played as a forward in the 1952–53 season and from 1958 to 1964 for two teams in the National Basketball Association (NBA). He is the second person, after Otto Graham, to win championships in two of the four major American sports: one with the Milwaukee Braves in the 1957 World Series and three with the Boston Celtics from 1959 to 1961.

== Early life ==
Conley was born in Muskogee, Oklahoma. While still young, his family moved to Richland, Washington. He attended Richland High School, where he played multiple sports. He reached the all-state team in baseball and basketball and was the state champion in the high jump.

Conley attended Washington State University, where (as he told The Boston Globe in 2004) students "kidnapped" him during a recruiting visit in an effort to convince him to matriculate. In 1950 he played on the Cougar team that reached the College World Series. In basketball, Conley was twice selected honorable mention to the All-America team, leading the team in scoring with 20 points per game. He was a first-team All-PCC selection in 1950.

During the summer, Conley pitched semiprofessional baseball in Walla Walla, Washington, in which scouts from almost every Major League Baseball team came to recruit him. He also was getting contract offers to play professional basketball from the Minneapolis Lakers and the Tri-Cities Blackhawks. At first he declined the offers, saying that his family didn't want him to sign any professional contracts until he finished school. But the offers were getting bigger, and in August 1950 he signed a professional contract with the Boston Braves for a $3,000 bonus.

== Minor league career ==
Conley attended spring training in 1951 and was assigned to Hartford of the Eastern League by the request of former Braves star Tommy Holmes, who was managing the club. After a month, Conley had a record of five wins and only one loss and was praised by observers in the league, saying that he had the best fastball since former pitcher Van Lingle Mungo played in the league in 1933. On June 10, he threw a one-hitter against Schenectady Blue Jays, giving up the lone hit in the seventh inning. Holmes was promoted to manager of the Braves on June 25, and was replaced by future Baseball Hall of Famer Travis Jackson.

By August 1, Conley had a record of 16 wins with only three losses, leading the league. He was unanimously selected to the Eastern League All-Star team on August 29. He received the Eastern League MVP award that season after he became the first player in Hartford history to win twenty games in a single season.

In the beginning of the 1952 season, Conley, along with fellow rookies George Crowe and Eddie Mathews, was invited to spring training with a chance of making the roster. Around that time, the United States Army was drafting for the Korean War. Many major and minor league players were selected to fight in the war, depleting team rosters. Conley was deferred because of his height (6'8'), which was above the Army maximum height for a soldier.

== Major league career ==
Conley's debut with the Boston Braves was April 17, 1952, versus the Brooklyn Dodgers, the Braves' third game of the regular season. Conley started and faced a lineup that included four future members of the National Baseball Hall of Fame in Roy Campanella, Jackie Robinson, Pee Wee Reese and Duke Snider. In four innings, Conley gave up four runs on 11 hits and two walks, taking the loss as the Dodgers prevailed 8–2. Conley lost his next three starts through early May, ending the season with an 0–4 record and a 7.82 ERA.

Conley returned to the majors in 1954 with the Milwaukee Braves, going 14–9 in 28 games with a 2.82 ERA, making the National League All-Star team and finishing third in Rookie of the Year voting behind Wally Moon and Ernie Banks, with Conley's Braves teammate Hank Aaron finishing fourth.

The following season in 1955, Conley was named to the All-Star game again, completing the season with an 11–7 record with a 4.16 ERA. Conley pitched for the Braves through 1959, compiling a record of 42–43 including an 0–6 record in his final season in Milwaukee.

In his lone postseason appearance in the 1957 World Series on Oct. 5 against the New York Yankees, Conley pitched 1 2/3 innings in relief of starter Bob Buhl, surrendering a two-run home run to Mickey Mantle as the Yankees went on to win the game 12–3; but with the Braves winning the series in seven games.

In the spring of 1959 with the Celtics in a playoff push, Conley delayed reporting to spring training with the Milwaukee Braves, prompting the team to trade Conley on March 31 to the Phillies. Conley made his third and final All-Star game with the Phillies, going 12–7 with a 3.00 ERA, with his season ending on August 19 after he was hit by a pitch while batting, breaking his hand.

After new contract talks bogged down on December 15, 1960, the Phillies traded Conley to the Red Sox; when he debuted with the Red Sox on April 28 against the Washington Senators, Conley became the first athlete to play for three professional teams in the same city along with the Celtics and his short stint with the Boston Braves in 1952. In three seasons with the Red Sox through 1963, Conley had a 29–32 record, with the win total including the final start of his major league career on Sept. 21, 1963, going six innings against the Minnesota Twins in an 11–2 victory.

In 11 seasons pitching for the Braves, Phillies and Red Sox, Conley posted a 91–96 record with 888 strikeouts and a 3.82 ERA in 1588.2 innings.

Conley was an above average hitter for a pitcher, posting a .192 batting average (105-for-548) with 33 runs, 19 doubles, 5 home runs and 45 RBI in 276 games. Defensively, he was below average, recording a .944 fielding percentage, which was 14 points lower than the league average at his position.

Conley was the winning pitcher in the 1955 All-Star Game and was selected for the 1954 and 1959 games.

Conley was the last living player to have played for both the Boston Red Sox and Boston Braves.

== Professional basketball career ==
In the middle of his first season of professional baseball, Conley agreed to sign with the Wilkes-Barre Barons of the struggling American Basketball League (1925–55).

On April 26, 1952, the Boston Celtics selected Conley with the 90th pick of the NBA draft. Playing 39 games as a rookie in the 1952–53 NBA season, Conley averaged about 12 minutes a game for a Celtics team that went 45–26 in the regular season under Red Auerbach. Conley did not play in the Celtics' two playoff series that season, with the team losing 3–1 in the Eastern Division finals to the New York Knicks.

After a five-year hiatus to focus on baseball with the Milwaukee Braves, Conley returned to the Celtics for the 1958–59 season, again seeing limited usage at about 13 minutes a game for a team that swept the Minneapolis Lakers 4–0 in the NBA finals. Conley averaged 4.2 points and 5.4 rebounds during the regular season and 4.9 points and 6.8 boards in the playoffs. Conley would have his best year as a Celtic the following season, averaging nearly 19 minutes a game during the regular season to score 6.7 points while hauling in 8.3 rebounds on average over 71 games in the regular season. The Celtics repeated as NBA champions with a 4–3 finals win over the St. Louis Hawks, with Conley roughly duplicating his regular-season averages during the playoffs.

Conley would play on one more championship Celtics team during the 1960–61 season, culminating in a 4–1 defeat of the Hawks. Conley skipped the following NBA season while pitching for the Red Sox, then joined the New York Knicks where he averaged 9.0 points and 6.7 rebounds in 70 games during the 1962–63 season, before his minutes dropped precipitously the following year which was his last in the NBA.

In six seasons in the NBA, Conley averaged 5.9 points and 6.3 rebounds per game in 16.5 minutes of playing time. Conley's No. 17 would subsequently be assigned to John Havlicek and then retired by the Celtics in recognition of Havlicek's career.

"When I look back, I don't know how I did it, I really don't", Conley was quoted saying in 2008 by the Los Angeles Times, on playing two professional sports in tandem. "I think I was having so much fun that it kept me going. I can't remember a teammate I didn't enjoy."

When Abe Saperstein's American Basketball League (1961–62) was born in 1961, Tuck Tape Company owner Paul Cohen purchased a franchise, gave it the Tapers name, and placed it in Washington, D.C.; the team played its games in the Washington Coliseum. Conley signed with the team. While with the Tapers, Conley often accompanied Cohen on sales calls for his company and gained industry experience.

Conley played in the Eastern Professional Basketball League (EPBL) for the Hartford Capitols and New Haven Elms from 1966 to 1969. He was selected to the All-EPBL Second Team in 1968. Conley served as head coach of the Elms during the 1968–69 season and the Capitols during the 1969–70 season; he accumulated an 0–8 record overall.

Conley is one of 13 athletes to have played in both the National Basketball Association and Major League Baseball. The thirteen are: Danny Ainge, Frank Baumholtz, Hank Biasatti, Conley, Chuck Connors, Dave DeBusschere, Dick Groat, Steve Hamilton, Mark Hendrickson, Cotton Nash, Ron Reed, Dick Ricketts and Howie Schultz.

== Retirement ==
After his retirement from professional sports, Conley started working for a duct tape company in Boston, Massachusetts. After a year working there, the owner of the duct tape company died. Conley later founded his own paper company, Foxboro Paper Company, which he owned for 36 years until he retired from the business.

The Washington Sports Hall of Fame included Conley in its 1979 class of inductees.

Until December 2009, Conley lived in Clermont, Florida, where he played golf and watched the Orlando Magic play in his free time. He moved to his vacation home in Waterville Valley, New Hampshire, in 2010.

Conley died of congestive heart failure at his home in Foxborough, Massachusetts on July 4, 2017.

== Personal life ==
Conley's mother was of Cherokee heritage and stood 6 ft (1.83 m) tall. Eugene was a citizen of the Cherokee Nation.

In the spring of 1951, Conley married Kathryn Dizney whom he met the previous fall. They had three children and seven grandchildren. In 2004, his wife released a biography of Conley called One of a Kind that chronicled his life in both baseball and basketball and related how his family dealt with his being gone for most of the year.

In the days following July 27, 1962, Conley made headlines after exiting a Red Sox team bus that was stuck in New York City traffic with teammate Pumpsie Green to find a restroom, with the bus driver subsequently driving away without the players on board. As Conley recollected the episode in a 2004 interview with the Boston Globe: "So we got off and went in this bar, and when we came back out, Pumpsie said, 'Hey, that bus is gone,' and I said, 'We are, too!'" Conley and Green checked into a hotel, with Green rejoining the team the next day in Washington, D.C., but Conley taking a hiatus during which he attracted media attention in attempting to fly to Jerusalem. As told by Conley, Red Sox owner Tom Yawkey fined him $1,500 with the promise he would refund the money at the end of the season if Conley rededicated himself to the team; Yawkey fulfilled the promise in September.

== Career statistics ==
Legend
GP	Games played	GS	Games started	MPG	Minutes per game
FG%	Field goal percentage	3P%	3-point field goal percentage	FT%	Free throw percentage
RPG	Rebounds per game	APG	Assists per game	SPG	Steals per game
BPG	Blocks per game	PPG	Points per game	**Bold**	Career high
†	Won an NBA championship

=== NBA ===
==== Regular season ====
Year	Team	GP	MPG	FG%	FT%	RPG	APG	PPG
1952–53	Boston	39	11.8	.324	.581	4.4	.5	2.3
1958–59†	Boston	50	13.3	.328	.578	5.5	.4	4.2
1959–60†	Boston	71	18.7	.373	.667	**8.3**	.5	6.7
1960–61†	Boston	**75**	16.6	.370	**.693**	7.3	.5	6.3
1962–63	New York	70	**22.1**	.390	.656	6.7	**1.0**	**9.0**
1963–64	New York	46	12.0	**.392**	.677	3.4	.5	4.2
Career		351	16.5	.371	.657	6.3	.6	5.9

==== Playoffs ====
Year	Team	GP	MPG	FG%	FT%	RPG	APG	PPG
1959†	Boston	11	14.3	.364	.462	6.8	**.6**	4.9
1960†	Boston	**13**	**20.7**	**.386**	**.727**	**8.9**	.2	**6.7**
1961†	Boston	9	6.2	.364	.583	3.4	.1	3.4
Career		33	14.6	.374	.617	6.7	.3	5.1
