= 1960–61 Boston Celtics season =

NBA basketball team season (won championship)

- NBA champions
- Division champions
- Head coach: Red Auerbach
- Arena: Boston Garden

Results
- Record: 57–22 (.722)
- Place: Division: 1st (Eastern)
- Playoff finish: NBA champions (Defeated Hawks 4–1)
- Stats at Basketball Reference

Local media
- Television: WHDH-TV
- Radio: WHDH

The 1960–61 Boston Celtics season was the 15th season for the franchise in the National Basketball Association (NBA). The Celtics finished the season by winning their fourth NBA Championship. HoopsHype later ranked this squad as having the 12th easiest route to the NBA Finals championship in 2024 due to the record of their first round opponent, the Syracuse Nationals.

== Draft picks ==
This table only displays picks through the second round.

Round	Pick	Player	Position	Nationality	College
1	8	Tom Sanders	SF/PF	United States	NYU
2	16	Leroy Wright	SF/PF	United States	Pacific

== Roster ==
1960–61 Boston Celtics roster
Players

Pos.	No.	Player	Height	Weight	DOB	From
F/C	17	Gene Conley	6 ft 8 in (2.03 m)	225 lb (102 kg)		Washington State
G	14	Bob Cousy	6 ft 1 in (1.85 m)	175 lb (79 kg)		Holy Cross
F	20	Gene Guarilia	6 ft 5 in (1.96 m)	220 lb (100 kg)		George Washington
F	15	Tom Heinsohn	6 ft 7 in (2.01 m)	218 lb (99 kg)		Holy Cross
G	25	K. C. Jones	6 ft 1 in (1.85 m)	200 lb (91 kg)		San Francisco
G/F	24	Sam Jones	6 ft 4 in (1.93 m)	198 lb (90 kg)		North Carolina Central
F	18	Jim Loscutoff	6 ft 5 in (1.96 m)	220 lb (100 kg)		Oregon
G/F	23	Frank Ramsey	6 ft 3 in (1.91 m)	190 lb (86 kg)		Kentucky
C	6	Bill Russell	6 ft 10 in (2.08 m)	215 lb (98 kg)		San Francisco
F	16	Satch Sanders	6 ft 6 in (1.98 m)	210 lb (95 kg)		NYU
G	21	Bill Sharman	6 ft 1 in (1.85 m)	175 lb (79 kg)		USC

Coaches
Head coach
- Red Auerbach

Legend
- (DP) Unsigned draft pick
- (FA) Free agent
- (S) Suspended
- Injured

== Regular season ==
=== Season standings ===
Eastern Division	W	L	PCT	GB	Home	Road	Neutral	Div
x-Boston Celtics	57	22	.722	–	21–7	24–11	12–4	28–11
x-Philadelphia Warriors	46	33	.582	11	23–6	12–21	11–6	22–17
x-Syracuse Nationals	38	41	.481	19	19–9	8–21	11–11	18–21
New York Knicks	21	58	.266	36	10–22	7–25	4–11	10–29

=== Game log ===
1960–61 game log
#	Date	Opponent	Score	High points	Record
1	October 22	Detroit	116–118	Bob Cousy (30)	1–0
2	October 28	@ New York	110–101	Bill Russell (22)	2–0
3	October 29	Philadelphia	131–103	Bill Russell (22)	2–1
4	November 5	Cincinnati	113–104	Cousy, Sharman (27)	2–2
5	November 8	@ Cincinnati	136–120	Tom Heinsohn (33)	3–2
6	November 11	vs. Cincinnati	110–128	Tom Heinsohn (30)	4–2
7	November 12	vs. Los Angeles	124–131	Sam Jones (25)	5–2
8	November 15	vs. Detroit	115–114 (OT)	Tom Heinsohn (23)	5–3
9	November 16	St. Louis	106–124	Bob Cousy (30)	6–3
10	November 19	@ Syracuse	114–94	Bill Russell (19)	7–3
11	November 20	@ Cincinnati	120–103	Bob Cousy (23)	8–3
12	November 23	New York	105–122	Frank Ramsey (24)	9–3
13	November 24	@ Philadelphia	132–129	Tom Heinsohn (26)	10–3
14	November 25	@ New York	111–110	Bill Sharman (26)	11–3
15	November 26	Syracuse	110–129	Tom Heinsohn (20)	12–3
16	November 29	@ St. Louis	119–109	Tom Heinsohn (25)	13–3
17	November 30	@ Detroit	125–110	Bill Sharman (23)	14–3
18	December 1	vs. New York	116–111	Heinsohn, Ramsey (22)	14–4
19	December 2	Los Angeles	120–117	Bill Sharman (32)	14–5
20	December 4	@ Los Angeles	113–103	Tom Heinsohn (34)	15–5
21	December 5	@ Los Angeles	123–101	Bob Cousy (24)	16–5
22	December 7	Syracuse	142–134	Tom Heinsohn (30)	16–6
23	December 8	vs. Cincinnati	118–115	Bill Russell (23)	16–7
24	December 9	Cincinnati	123–146	Bill Sharman (26)	17–7
25	December 10	@ Philadelphia	97–102	Bill Russell (22)	17–8
26	December 13	@ New York	115–117	Bob Cousy (30)	17–9
27	December 15	vs. Syracuse	105–115	Bob Cousy (28)	18–9
28	December 17	Los Angeles	112–140	Bob Cousy (25)	19–9
29	December 20	vs. Cincinnati	112–115	Tom Heinsohn (23)	20–9
30	December 21	St. Louis	108–120	Sam Jones (28)	21–9
31	December 24	Detroit	106–150	Bob Cousy (25)	22–9
32	December 26	Philadelphia	115–119	Heinsohn, S. Jones (25)	23–9
33	December 27	@ Philadelphia	101–116	Tom Heinsohn (30)	23–10
34	December 28	@ St. Louis	99–105	Frank Ramsey (19)	23–11
35	December 30	@ New York	120–106	Tom Heinsohn (30)	24–11
36	January 1	@ Syracuse	113–96	Tom Heinsohn (23)	25–11
37	January 3	@ Los Angeles	102–96	Bob Cousy (27)	26–11
38	January 5	@ Cincinnati	125–107	Frank Ramsey (28)	27–11
39	January 6	@ Detroit	108–102	Tom Heinsohn (31)	28–11
40	January 8	@ St. Louis	104–133	Sam Jones (24)	28–12
41	January 10	vs. Detroit	98–118	Tom Heinsohn (25)	29–12
42	January 12	vs. Syracuse	118–124 (OT)	Bob Cousy (33)	30–12
43	January 13	Philadelphia	121–123 (OT)	Sam Jones (34)	31–12
44	January 14	@ Philadelphia	113–116	Frank Ramsey (21)	31–13
45	January 15	New York	124–142	Tom Heinsohn (31)	32–13
46	January 18	St. Louis	125–114	Bob Cousy (23)	32–14
47	January 19	vs. Los Angeles	103–106	Cousy, Heinsohn (22)	33–14
48	January 21	@ Syracuse	124–127	Tom Heinsohn (34)	33–15
49	January 24	@ New York	125–112	Bob Cousy (33)	34–15
50	January 26	@ Philadelphia	129–121	Heinsohn, S. Jones (26)	35–15
51	January 27	Detroit	111–140	Sam Jones (28)	36–15
52	January 29	Philadelphia	115–128	Bill Sharman (21)	37–15
53	January 30	@ Cincinnati	88–116	Cousy, Russell (14)	37–16
54	January 31	@ St. Louis	109–103	Bill Russell (25)	38–16
55	February 1	vs. New York	120–124	Tom Heinsohn (31)	39–16
56	February 3	New York	109–123	Tom Heinsohn (23)	40–16
57	February 5	St. Louis	121–123	Tom Heinsohn (24)	41–16
58	February 7	vs. Los Angeles	95–96	Bill Russell (26)	42–16
59	February 8	@ Syracuse	108–130	Bill Sharman (26)	42–17
60	February 10	@ Detroit	134–137	Sam Jones (29)	42–18
61	February 11	New York	129–107	Frank Ramsey (26)	42–19
62	February 12	Philadelphia	125–136	Sam Jones (25)	43–19
63	February 14	vs. Los Angeles	93–113	Bob Cousy (19)	44–19
64	February 16	vs. Philadelphia	121–111	Bill Sharman (28)	44–20
65	February 17	@ Philadelphia	133–128	Bill Russell (28)	45–20
66	February 19	@ Syracuse	116–106	Tom Heinsohn (25)	46–20
67	February 22	@ Los Angeles	93–105	Bill Russell (21)	46–21
68	February 24	Syracuse	128–144	Tom Heinsohn (26)	47–21
69	February 25	@ St. Louis	122–109	Bob Cousy (23)	48–21
70	February 26	@ Detroit	113–99	Cousy, Heinsohn (23)	49–21
71	February 28	@ New York	142–116	Bill Russell (24)	50–21
72	March 1	St. Louis	110–97	Bill Sharman (23)	50–22
73	March 4	New York	110–113	Bob Cousy (20)	51–22
74	March 5	Philadelphia	129–146	Bill Russell (37)	52–22
75	March 7	vs. Cincinnati	121–124	Bill Russell (25)	53–22
76	March 8	Syracuse	127–136	Bill Sharman (27)	54–22
77	March 9	vs. Detroit	118–119	Frank Ramsey (31)	55–22
78	March 11	Syracuse	116–126	Bill Russell (24)	56–22
79	March 12	@ Syracuse	136–134 (OT)	Sam Jones (44)	57–22

== Playoffs ==
1961 playoff game log
Division Finals: 4–1 (home: 3–0; road: 1–1)

Game	Date	Team	Score	High points	High rebounds	High assists	Location Attendance	Series
1	March 19	Syracuse	W 128–115	Frank Ramsey (25)	—	Bob Cousy (9)	Boston Garden; 7,728	1–0
2	March 21	@ Syracuse	L 98–115	Bill Russell (17)	—	Bill Russell (5)	Onondaga War Memorial; 6,657	1–1
3	March 23	Syracuse	W 133–110	Bill Sharman (30)	Bill Russell (39)	Bob Cousy (12)	Boston Garden; 11,754	2–1
4	March 25	@ Syracuse	W 120–107	Tom Heinsohn (22)	—	Bob Cousy (9)	Onondaga War Memorial	3–1
5	March 26	Syracuse	W 123–101	Bill Sharman (27)	Bill Russell (33)	Frank Ramsey (6)	Boston Garden; 12,292	4–1

NBA Finals: 4–1 (home: 3–0; road: 1–1)

Game	Date	Team	Score	High points	High rebounds	High assists	Location Attendance	Series
1	April 2	St. Louis	W 129–95	Tom Heinsohn (26)	Bill Russell (31)	Bob Cousy (7)	Boston Garden; 11,531	1–0
2	April 5	St. Louis	W 116–108	Bob Cousy (26)	Bill Russell (28)	Bob Cousy (14)	Boston Garden; 13,909	2–0
3	April 8	@ St. Louis	L 120–124	Russell, Heinsohn (24)	Bill Russell (23)	Bill Russell (9)	Kiel Auditorium; 8,468	2–1
4	April 9	@ St. Louis	W 119–104	Cousy, Sanders (22)	Bill Russell (24)	Bob Cousy (12)	Kiel Auditorium; 10,442	3–1
5	April 11	St. Louis	W 121–112	Bill Russell (30)	Bill Russell (18)	Bob Cousy (12)	Boston Garden; 13,909	4–1

1961 schedule

== Awards and honors ==
- Bill Russell, NBA Most Valuable Player Award
- Bob Cousy, All-NBA First Team
- Bill Russell, All-NBA Second Team
- Tom Heinsohn, All-NBA Second Team
