= Al Attles =

American basketball player and coach (1936–2024)

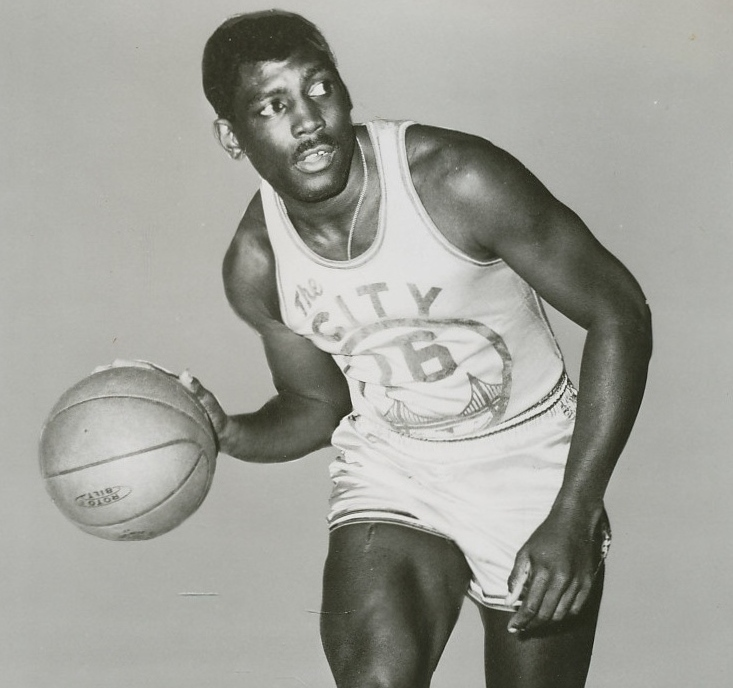
- Attles with the San Francisco Warriors in 1970

Personal information
- Born: November 7, 1936 Newark, New Jersey, U.S.
- Died: August 20, 2024 (aged 87) Oakland, California, U.S.
- Listed height: 6 ft 1 in (1.85 m)
- Listed weight: 175 lb (79 kg)

Career information
- High school: Weequahic (Newark, New Jersey)
- College: North Carolina A&T (1956–1960)
- NBA draft: 1960: 5th round, 39th overall pick
- Drafted by: Philadelphia Warriors
- Playing career: 1960–1971
- Position: Point guard
- Number: 16
- Coaching career: 1968–1983, 1994–1995

Career history

Playing
- 1960–1971: Philadelphia / San Francisco Warriors

Career highlights
- As player: No. 16 retired by Golden State Warriors; No. 22 retired by North Carolina A&T Aggies; As coach: NBA champion (1975); 2× NBA All-Star Game head coach (1975, 1976); Chuck Daly Lifetime Achievement Award (2017)

Career playing statistics
- Points: 6,328 (8.9 ppg)
- Rebounds: 2,463 (3.5 rpg)
- Assists: 2,483 (3.5 apg)
- Stats at NBA.com
- Stats at Basketball Reference

Career coaching record
- NBA: 557–518 (.518)
- Record at Basketball Reference
- Basketball Hall of Fame

Alvin Austin Attles Jr. (November 7, 1936 – August 20, 2024) was an American professional basketball player, coach, and executive who spent his entire career with the Golden State Warriors of the National Basketball Association (NBA). Nicknamed the "Destroyer", he played the point guard position.

Attles was selected by the Warriors in the 1960 NBA draft and played 11 seasons with the team, including moving with the team from Philadelphia to the San Francisco Bay Area in 1962. He took over as player-coach during the 1970–71 season, his last as a player. He remained the team's head coach after his playing retirement and led the Warriors to an NBA championship in 1975. He stepped down as head coach in 1983 and then served as general manager for the Warriors from 1983 to 1986. Attles was employed by the Warriors for the rest of his life, serving in roles including team ambassador and community relations representative.

Attles's number 16 was retired by the Warriors in 1977. He was inducted into the Naismith Memorial Basketball Hall of Fame in 2019.

== Biography ==
=== Early life ===
Attles was born in Newark, New Jersey, to Alvin Sr. and Geraldine Attles. His father worked as a railway porter. Attles was a graduate of Weequahic High School in Newark. He held a bachelor's degree in Physical Education and History from North Carolina A&T State University. Before the Warriors drafted him, he intended to return to Newark and coach at his local junior high school. He initially declined before accepting and going to training camp.

=== Playing career ===
Attles was drafted by the then-Philadelphia Warriors in 1960 as a fifth-round selection. On March 2, 1962, he was the team's second-leading scorer with 17 points, shooting a perfect 8-of-8 on field goals and 1-of-1 on free throws, on the night Wilt Chamberlain scored 100 points. Attles moved with the team to the Bay Area at the end of the 1962 season, playing until 1971. Attles was known as "the Destroyer" due to his defensive specialities along with once punching a player in the jaw. He was a reserve on the 1964 Warriors team (with Wilt Chamberlain and Guy Rodgers) that reached the NBA Finals and lost to the Boston Celtics, four games to one. Attles also played on the Warriors' 1967 team that lost to Chamberlain's 68–13 Philadelphia 76ers in a six-game championship series.

=== Coaching career ===
Attles was named player-coach of the Warriors midway through the 1969–70 season, succeeding George Lee. He was one of the first African-American head coaches in the NBA. He retired as a player after the 1970–71 season, and stayed on as head coach, guiding the Rick Barry-led Warriors to the 1975 NBA championship over the heavily favored Washington Bullets, making him the second African-American coach to win an NBA title (the first was Bill Russell). Attles's team tried to repeat the following season, but they lost to the Phoenix Suns in the conference finals in seven games. The team would make the playoffs only once more for the remainder of his tenure as coach. Attles tore his Achilles tendon during the 1979–80 season and missed 21 games which were covered by his assistant Johnny Bach.

Attles coached the Warriors until 1983, compiling a 557–518 regular-season record (588–548 including playoffs) with six playoff appearances in 14 seasons. From 1983 to 1986, Attles worked as the Warriors' general manager. He is the longest-serving coach in Warriors history, and also had the most wins in franchise history until being surpassed by Steve Kerr in March 2025.

Attles returned as an assistant coach for the Warriors for the 1994–95 season.

=== Death ===
Attles died at his East Bay, California, home on August 20, 2024, at the age of 87. He had spent weeks in hospice care.

== Honors ==
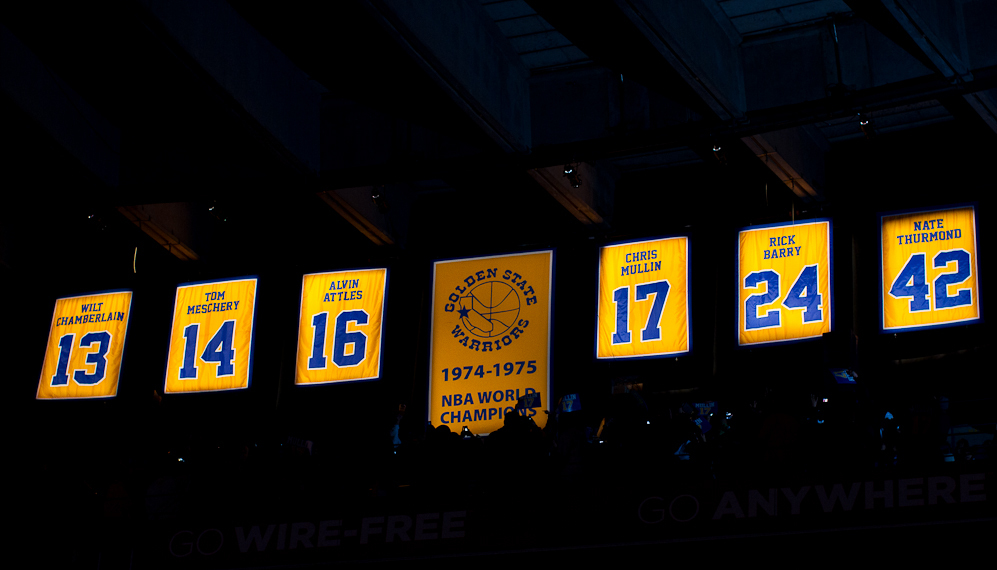
Attles's no. 16 banner hanging amongst others in Oakland Arena

In 2014, Attles was the recipient of the John W. Bunn Lifetime Achievement Award, an annual basketball award given by the Naismith Memorial Basketball Hall of Fame to an individual who has contributed significantly to the sport of basketball; the award is the Basketball Hall of Fame's highest honor besides enshrinement.

Attles's number 16 is retired by the Warriors. He also served as a team ambassador. On February 7, 2015, Attles's number 22 was retired by North Carolina A&T, the first ever retired by the team. He was inducted into the Bay Area Sports Hall of Fame in 1993.

Attles was on the Warriors' payroll in one capacity or another for over 60 years, the longest stint of any person for one team. He was one of the last living members of the franchise who dates to their time in Philadelphia. Attles was working as a community relations representative at the time of his death.

In 2017, Attles was named a recipient of the Chuck Daly Lifetime Achievement Award.

On April 6, 2019, Attles was chosen as a member of the Naismith Memorial Basketball Hall of Fame.

== Personal life ==
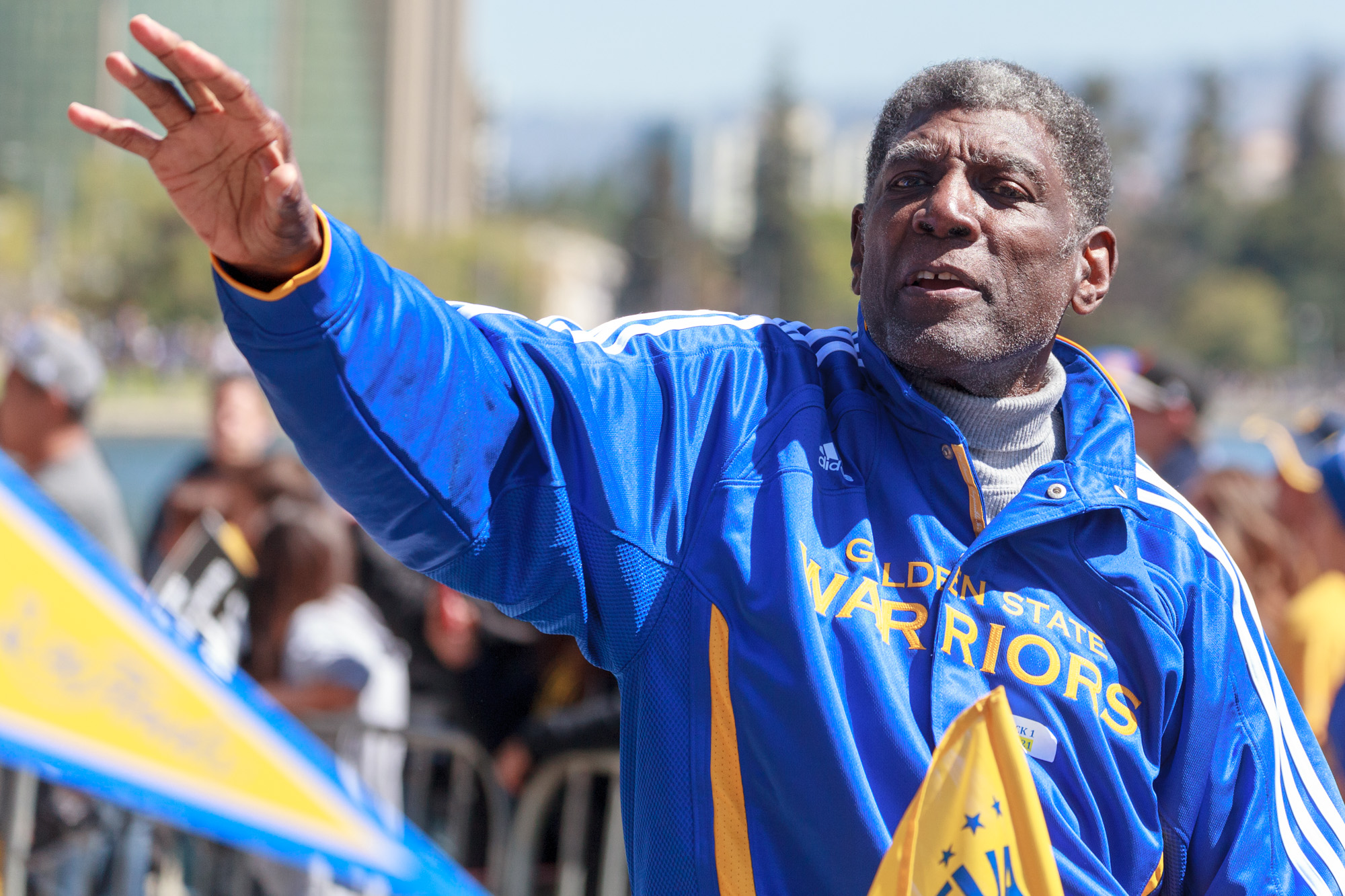
Attles at the Warriors' championship parade in 2015

Attles married his wife, Wilhelmina Rice, in 1964; his Warriors teammate, Wilt Chamberlain, was his best man. The couple have two children, Alvin III and Ericka. He has four grandchildren and one great-grandson. One of his grandsons, Isaiah Attles, played college basketball for the Alcorn State Braves. Attles was friends with Bill Cosby and Les McCann. Attles was Catholic.

In 1983, Attles received a master's degree in Curriculum and Instruction from the University of San Francisco.

== Career statistics ==
Legend
| GP | Games played | GS | Games started | MPG | Minutes per game |
| FG% | Field goal percentage | 3P% | 3-point field goal percentage | FT% | Free throw percentage |
| RPG | Rebounds per game | APG | Assists per game | SPG | Steals per game |
| BPG | Blocks per game | PPG | Points per game | **Bold** | Career high |
| † | Won an NBA championship | * | Led the league |

=== Playing ===
==== NBA ====
===== Regular season =====
| Year | Team | GP | MPG | FG% | FT% | RPG | APG | PPG |
|---|---|---|---|---|---|---|---|---|
| 1960–61 | Philadelphia | 77 | 20.1 | .409 | .599 | 2.8 | 2.3 | 7.0 |
| 1961–62 | Philadelphia | 75 | **32.9** | .474 | .592 | **4.7** | 4.4 | **11.3** |
| 1962–63 | San Francisco | 71 | 26.4 | .478 | .646 | 2.9 | 2.6 | 10.4 |
| 1963–64 | San Francisco | 70 | 26.9 | .452 | .673 | 3.4 | 2.8 | 10.9 |
| 1964–65 | San Francisco | 73 | 23.7 | .384 | .624 | 3.3 | 2.8 | 9.4 |
| 1965–66 | San Francisco | **79** | 26.0 | **.503** | .611 | 4.1 | 2.8 | 11.2 |
| 1966–67 | San Francisco | 69 | 25.6 | .454 | .583 | **4.7** | 3.9 | 7.4 |
| 1967–68 | San Francisco | 67 | 29.7 | .467 | **.694** | 4.1 | 5.8 | 9.8 |
| 1968–69 | San Francisco | 51 | 29.7 | .451 | .638 | 3.5 | **6.0** | 8.2 |
| 1969–70 | San Francisco | 45 | 15.0 | .386 | .664 | 1.6 | 3.2 | 5.1 |
| 1970–71 | San Francisco | 34 | 9.4 | .407 | .585 | 1.2 | 1.7 | 2.0 |
| Career | | 711 | 25.1 | .451 | .632 | 3.5 | 3.5 | 8.9 |

===== Playoffs =====
| Year | Team | GP | MPG | FG% | FT% | RPG | APG | PPG |
|---|---|---|---|---|---|---|---|---|
| 1961 | Philadelphia | 3 | **36.7** | .462 | .357 | 4.0 | 3.0 | 9.7 |
| 1962 | Philadelphia | 12 | 28.2 | .368 | .548 | 4.6 | 2.3 | 6.1 |
| 1964 | San Francisco | 12* | 32.2 | .403 | .536 | 3.1 | 2.5 | **12.2** |
| 1967 | San Francisco | **15*** | 15.8 | .435 | .375 | 4.1 | 2.5 | 3.1 |
| 1968 | San Francisco | 10 | 27.7 | .403 | **.767** | **5.3** | **7.0** | 7.3 |
| 1969 | San Francisco | 6 | 18.2 | .333 | .250 | 3.0 | 3.5 | 2.5 |
| 1971 | San Francisco | 4 | 11.8 | **.571** | .571 | 2.0 | 2.8 | 3.0 |
| Career | | 62 | 24.3 | .403 | .544 | 4.0 | 3.3 | 6.4 |

=== Head coaching record ===
Legend
| Regular season | G | Games coached | W | Games won | L | Games lost | W–L % | Win–loss % |
| Playoffs | PG | Playoff games | PW | Playoff wins | PL | Playoff losses | PW–L % | Playoff win–loss % |

| Team | Year | G | W | L | W–L% | Finish | PG | PW | PL | PW–L% | Result |
|---|---|---|---|---|---|---|---|---|---|---|---|
| San Francisco | 1969–70 | 30 | 8 | 22 | .267 | 6th in Western | — | — | — | — | — |
| San Francisco | 1970–71 | 82 | 41 | 41 | .500 | 2nd in Pacific | 5 | 1 | 4 | .200 | Lost in Conf. Semifinals |
| Golden State | 1971–72 | 82 | 51 | 31 | .622 | 2nd in Pacific | 5 | 1 | 4 | .200 | Lost in Conf. Semifinals |
| Golden State | 1972–73 | 82 | 47 | 35 | .573 | 2nd in Pacific | 11 | 5 | 6 | .455 | Lost in Conf. Finals |
| Golden State | 1973–74 | 82 | 44 | 38 | .537 | 2nd in Pacific | — | — | — | — | — |
| Golden State | 1974–75 | 82 | 48 | 34 | .585 | 1st in Pacific | 17 | 12 | 5 | .706 | **Won NBA Championship** |
| Golden State | 1975–76 | 82 | 59 | 23 | .720 | 1st in Pacific | 13 | 7 | 6 | .538 | Lost in Conf. Finals |
| Golden State | 1976–77 | 82 | 46 | 36 | .561 | 3rd in Pacific | 10 | 5 | 5 | .500 | Lost in Conf. Semifinals |
| Golden State | 1977–78 | 82 | 43 | 39 | .524 | 5th in Pacific | — | — | — | — | — |
| Golden State | 1978–79 | 82 | 38 | 44 | .463 | 6th in Pacific | — | — | — | — | — |
| Golden State | 1979–80 | 61 | 18 | 43 | .295 | 6th in Pacific | — | — | — | — | — |
| Golden State | 1980–81 | 82 | 39 | 43 | .476 | 4th in Pacific | — | — | — | — | — |
| Golden State | 1981–82 | 82 | 45 | 37 | .549 | 4th in Pacific | — | — | — | — | — |
| Golden State | 1982–83 | 82 | 30 | 52 | .366 | 5th in Pacific | — | — | — | — | — |
| **Career** | | 1,075 | 557 | 518 | .518 | | 61 | 31 | 30 | .508 | |
