= Bob Ferry =

American basketball player and executive (1937–2021)

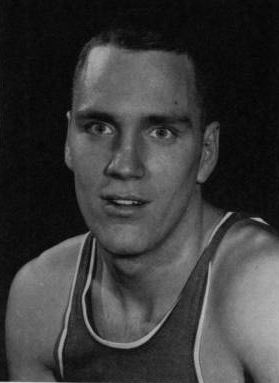
- Ferry as a senior at Saint Louis

Personal information
- Born: May 31, 1937 St. Louis, Missouri, U.S.
- Died: October 27, 2021 (aged 84) Annapolis, Maryland, U.S.
- Listed height: 6 ft 8 in (2.03 m)
- Listed weight: 230 lb (104 kg)

Career information
- High school: Cleveland (St. Louis, Missouri)
- College: Saint Louis (1956–1959)
- NBA draft: 1959: territorial pick
- Drafted by: St. Louis Hawks
- Playing career: 1959–1969
- Position: Power forward / center
- Number: 20, 16, 12
- Coaching career: 1969–1973

Career history

Playing
- 1959–1960: St. Louis Hawks
- 1960–1964: Detroit Pistons
- 1964–1969: Baltimore Bullets

Coaching
- 1969–1973: Baltimore Bullets (assistant)

Career highlights
- As player: First-team All-American – USBWA (1959); Second-team All-American – NEA (1959); Third-team All-American – AP, NABC, UPI (1959); First-team All-MVC (1959); No. 43 jersey retired by Saint Louis Billikens; As executive: NBA champion (1978); 2× NBA Executive of the Year (1979, 1982)

Career NBA statistics
- Points: 5,780 (9.1 ppg)
- Rebounds: 3,343 (5.3 rpg)
- Assists: 906 (1.4 apg)
- Stats at NBA.com
- Stats at Basketball Reference

Robert Dean Ferry (May 31, 1937 – October 27, 2021) was an American professional basketball player, assistant coach, and general manager (GM) in the National Basketball Association (NBA). He played for the St. Louis Hawks, Detroit Pistons, and Baltimore Bullets from 1959 to 1969. He then served as GM of the Bullets from 1973 to 1990, overseeing the franchise's only NBA championship in 1978. He played college basketball for Saint Louis.

== Early life ==
Ferry was born in St. Louis on May 31, 1937, and was the oldest of four children. His father, Willard, worked at Fisher Body; his mother, Elsie, was a housewife who was also employed by Pet, Inc. He attended Cleveland High School, where he played baseball, before concentrating on basketball. Having been recruited by Eddie Hickey, Ferry then studied at Saint Louis University, where he received All-America honors during his senior year in 1959. He graduated with a degree in General Studies that same year, and his number 43 was later retired by the Saint Louis Billikens. He was selected in the 1959 NBA draft as the territorial pick of the St. Louis Hawks, who had the seventh overall selection that year.

== Playing career ==
Ferry made his NBA debut on October 24, 1959, scoring one point on a free throw against the Minneapolis Lakers. At the end of his rookie season, he was traded to the Detroit Pistons in exchange for Ed Conlin. Ferry went on to lead the NBA in games played in 1960–61 (79) and 1961–62 (80), while finishing eleventh in field goal percentage (.451) in the former season. After four seasons with the Pistons, he was traded to the Baltimore Bullets along with Bailey Howell, Les Hunter, Wali Jones, and Don Ohl in an eight-player blockbuster deal on June 18, 1964, that included future Hall of Famer Rod Thorn. Ferry ultimately played ten seasons in the NBA with the Hawks, Pistons, and Bullets, scoring 5,780 points to go along with 906 assists and 3,343 rebounds.

== NBA executive career ==
After retiring as a player at the end of the 1968–69 season due to an injury, Ferry remained with the Bullets and initially served as a scout and assistant coach to Gene Shue. Ferry was credited with advising the franchise to select Wes Unseld in the 1968 NBA draft. He was eventually promoted to general manager (GM) of the Bullets on June 13, 1973. His son, Danny, joked that owner Abe Pollin made Ferry GM because of the latter's success selling numerous advertisements for the Bullets' game programs, which gave management the impression that Ferry "must know a lot about business".

During Ferry's tenure as GM from 1973 to 1990, the Bullets won their only NBA championship in 1978 and made it to three other Finals: the Bullets lost to the Milwaukee Bucks in 1971, the Golden State Warriors in 1975 and the Seattle SuperSonics in 1979. Ferry also won the NBA Executive of the Year Award in 1979 and 1982, and was one of only 11 league GMs to win the award in multiple seasons at the time of his death.

He was also one of four GMs in NBA history with at least 700 wins, 13 playoff appearances, and one championship, the others being R. C. Buford, Jerry West, and Jerry Krause. Ferry was responsible for hiring K. C. Jones (1973) and Unseld (1988), becoming the second GM in the NBA (after Red Auerbach) to hire two African-American head coaches on a permanent basis.

Ferry quit as the Bullets GM on June 12, 1990, on the heels of two subpar seasons, having come to a mutual agreement with Pollin that the franchise was in need of a change in administration. He then became a scout for the Cleveland Cavaliers, the Hawks (who relocated to Atlanta), and the Brooklyn Nets over the next quarter of a century. He also had a brief stint on The NBA on NBC as an "Insider" alongside Peter Vescey in the early 1990s. He participated in a senior basketball league until he was in his 70s, and also took up tennis and golf. In the 31 seasons from his retirement until his death, the since-renamed Wizards advanced to the playoffs just ten times.

== Personal life ==
Ferry was married to Rita Brooks for over sixty years until his death. They met at Saint Louis University. Together, they had three children: Bob Jr., Danny, and Laura. Danny had a thirteen-year NBA playing career, and later was general manager of the Cleveland Cavaliers and Atlanta Hawks. Bob Jr. played for Dematha Catholic High School and Harvard University. Laura is a professor at Georgetown University and marketing executive in the DC Metro area.

Ferry was a practicing Catholic. His family initially resided in Bowie, Maryland, before relocating to Annapolis. He died on October 27, 2021, at Anne Arundel Medical Center in Annapolis. He suffered from melanoma and a heart condition, and was hospitalized for 12 days prior to his death at the age of 84.

== Career statistics ==
Legend
GP	Games played	GS	Games started	MPG	Minutes per game
FG%	Field goal percentage	3P%	3-point field goal percentage	FT%	Free throw percentage
RPG	Rebounds per game	APG	Assists per game	SPG	Steals per game
BPG	Blocks per game	PPG	Points per game	**Bold**	Career high
*	Led the league

=== NBA ===
==== Regular season ====
Year	Team	GP	MPG	FG%	FT%	RPG	APG	PPG
1959–60	St. Louis	62	14.1	.426	.639	3.8	.6	5.9
1960–61	Detroit	79*	21.0	**.451**	**.741**	6.3	1.6	11.3
1961–62	Detroit	**80***	24.0	.438	.678	6.3	1.8	**13.9**
1962–63	Detroit	79	**31.4**	.433	.649	**6.8**	**2.2**	13.6
1963–64	Detroit	74	20.6	.445	.667	5.8	1.3	10.6
1964–65	Baltimore	77	16.6	.423	.613	4.6	.8	5.3
1965–66	Baltimore	66	18.6	.411	.669	5.1	1.7	7.3
1966–67	Baltimore	51	19.4	.419	.636	5.1	1.8	6.5
1967–68	Baltimore	59	14.3	.412	.624	3.2	1.0	5.6
1968–69	Baltimore	7	5.1	.357	.500	1.3	.6	1.9
Career		634	20.2	.433	.664	5.3	1.4	9.1

==== Playoffs ====
Year	Team	GP	MPG	FG%	FT%	RPG	APG	PPG
1960	St. Louis	**11**	5.1	.526	.571	1.4	.0	2.2
1961	Detroit	5	33.4	.405	**.837**	**12.6**	2.2	**20.2**
1962	Detroit	9	18.4	.457	.605	4.6	1.4	11.1
1963	Detroit	4	**35.8**	.444	.333	8.8	**2.8**	12.0
1965	Baltimore	10	6.7	.438	.222	1.9	.8	1.6
1966	Baltimore	3	27.3	**.550**	.692	8.3	1.0	10.3
Career		42	16.2	.451	.621	4.7	1.1	7.6
