= 1961 NBA playoffs =

Postseason tournament

Tournament details
- Dates: March 14–April 11, 1961
- Season: 1960–61
- Teams: 6

Final positions
- Champions: Boston Celtics (4th title)
- Runners-up: St. Louis Hawks
- Semifinalists: Los Angeles Lakers; Syracuse Nationals

Tournament statistics
- Scoring leader(s): Elgin Baylor (Lakers) (38.1 PPG)

The 1961 NBA playoffs was the postseason tournament of the National Basketball Association's 1960-61 season. The tournament concluded with the Eastern Division champion Boston Celtics defeating the Western Division champion St. Louis Hawks 4 games to 1 in the NBA Finals.

The Lakers made the playoffs for the first time after moving to Los Angeles. They were one game away from their first Finals in L.A., as the St. Louis Hawks defeated them four games to three in the western division finals.

The Division Semifinals were extended from a best-of-three to a best-of-five series.

For the Celtics, it was their third straight NBA title and fourth overall. This would be the last Finals appearance for the Hawks franchise to date; though they still exist in the NBA as the Atlanta Hawks, they have yet to return to the Finals as of 2026.

== Bracket ==
Division Semifinals
E3	Syracuse	3
E2	Philadelphia	0
W3	Detroit	2
W2	Los Angeles	3

Division Finals
Eastern Division
E1	Boston*	4
E3	Syracuse	1
Western Division
W1	St. Louis*	4
W2	Los Angeles	3

NBA Finals
E1	Boston*	4
W1	St. Louis*	1

- * Division winner
- Bold Series winner
- Italic Team with home-court advantage in NBA Finals

== Division Semifinals ==
=== Eastern Division Semifinals ===
==== (2) Philadelphia Warriors vs. (3) Syracuse Nationals ====
March 14

Boxscore

Syracuse Nationals 115, Philadelphia Warriors 107
Scoring by quarter: 34–24, 23–32, 29–19, 29–32
Pts: Larry Costello 28; Rebs: Swede Halbrook 15; Asts: Larry Costello 11	Pts: Wilt Chamberlain 46; Rebs: Wilt Chamberlain 32; Asts: Tom Gola 7
Syracuse leads series, 1–0

Philadelphia Civic Center, Philadelphia, Pennsylvania
Attendance: 4,391

March 16

Boxscore

Philadelphia Warriors 114, Syracuse Nationals 115
Scoring by quarter: 22–26, 35–28, 22–39, 35–22
Pts: Wilt Chamberlain 32; Rebs: Wilt Chamberlain 14; Asts: Arizin, Attles 5 each	Pts: Hal Greer 26; Rebs: Dolph Schayes 14; Asts: Larry Costello 6
Syracuse leads series, 2–0

Onondaga War Memorial, Syracuse, New York
Attendance: 5,304

March 18

Boxscore

Syracuse Nationals 106, Philadelphia Warriors 103
Scoring by quarter: 31–22, 19–30, 27–30, 29–21
Pts: Larry Costello 20; Rebs: Red Kerr 18; Asts: Larry Costello 8	Pts: Wilt Chamberlain 33; Rebs: Wilt Chamberlain 23; Asts: Gola, Rodgers 5 each
Syracuse wins series, 3–0

Philadelphia Civic Center, Philadelphia, Pennsylvania

This was the eighth playoff meeting between these two teams, with the 76ers/Nationals winning four of the first seven meetings.

Previous playoff series
Philadelphia 76ers/ Syracuse Nationals leads 4–3 in all-time playoff series

1950

Philadelphia Warriors 0, Syracuse Nationals 2

1950 Eastern Division Semifinals

1951

Philadelphia Warriors 0, Syracuse Nationals 2

1951 Eastern Division Semifinals

1952

Philadelphia Warriors 1, Syracuse Nationals 2

1952 Eastern Division Semifinals

1956

Philadelphia Warriors 3, Syracuse Nationals 2

1956 Eastern Division Finals

1957

Philadelphia Warriors 0, Syracuse Nationals 2

1957 Eastern Division Semifinals

1958

Philadelphia Warriors 2, Syracuse Nationals 1

1958 Eastern Division Semifinals

1960

Philadelphia Warriors 2, Syracuse Nationals 1

1960 Eastern Division Semifinals

=== Western Division Semifinals ===
==== (2) Los Angeles Lakers vs. (3) Detroit Pistons ====
March 14

Boxscore

Detroit Pistons 102, Los Angeles Lakers 120
Scoring by quarter: 25–30, 28–29, 23–34, 26–27
Pts: Gene Shue 20; Rebs: Walter Dukes 11	Pts: Elgin Baylor 40; Rebs: Ray Felix 21
Los Angeles leads series, 1–0

Los Angeles Memorial Sports Arena, Los Angeles, California

March 15

Boxscore

Detroit Pistons 118, Los Angeles Lakers 127
Scoring by quarter: 24–30, 31–24, 28–37, 35–36
Pts: McMillon, Shue 24 each Rebs: Walter Dukes 12	Pts: Elgin Baylor 49; Rebs: Elgin Baylor 21
Los Angeles leads series, 2–0

Los Angeles Memorial Sports Arena, Los Angeles, California
Attendance: 4,253

March 17

Boxscore

Los Angeles Lakers 113, Detroit Pistons 124
Scoring by quarter: 25–24, 25–42, 29–35, 34–23
Pts: Elgin Baylor 26	Pts: Bob Ferry 30
Los Angeles leads series, 2–1

Detroit Olympia, Detroit, Michigan
Attendance: 3,422

March 18

Boxscore

Los Angeles Lakers 114, Detroit Pistons 123
Scoring by quarter: 39–30, 21–27, 25–37, 29–29
Pts: Elgin Baylor 47	Pts: Gene Shue 29
Series tied, 2–2

Detroit Olympia, Detroit, Michigan

March 19

Boxscore

Detroit Pistons 120, Los Angeles Lakers 137
Scoring by quarter: 21–34, 25–27, 32–43, 42–33
Pts: Bob Ferry 25; Rebs: Bob Ferry 16	Pts: Elgin Baylor 35; Rebs: Baylor, Felix 15 each
Los Angeles wins series, 3–2

Los Angeles Memorial Sports Arena, Los Angeles, California
Attendance: 3,705

This was the eighth playoff meeting between these two teams, with the Lakers winning six of the first seven meetings when the Lakers were in Minneapolis. (It was also the 18th playoff series in Pistons history, and the first time they met a team that would not later move to another city.)

Previous playoff series
Los Angeles leads 6–1 in all-time playoff series

1950

Fort Wayne Pistons 0, Minneapolis Lakers 2

1950 Central Division Finals

1953

Fort Wayne Pistons 2, Minneapolis Lakers 3

1953 Western Division Finals

1954

Fort Wayne Pistons 0, Minneapolis Lakers 2

1954 Western Division Round Robin Semifinals

1955

Fort Wayne Pistons 3, Minneapolis Lakers 1

1955 Western Division Finals

1957

Fort Wayne Pistons 0, Minneapolis Lakers 2

1957 Western Division Semifinals

1959

Detroit Pistons 1, Minneapolis Lakers 2

1959 Western Division Semifinals

1960

Detroit Pistons 0, Minneapolis Lakers 2

1960 Western Division Semifinals

== Division Finals ==
=== Eastern Division Finals ===
==== (1) Boston Celtics vs. (3) Syracuse Nationals ====
March 19

Boxscore

Syracuse Nationals 115, Boston Celtics 128
Scoring by quarter: 29–37, 27–22, 28–35, 31–34
Pts: Dolph Schayes 26; Asts: Schayes, Costello 6 each	Pts: Frank Ramsey 25; Asts: Bob Cousy 9
Boston leads series, 1–0

Boston Garden, Boston, Massachusetts
Attendance: 7,728

March 21

Boxscore

Boston Celtics 98, Syracuse Nationals 115
Scoring by quarter: 21–28, 30–26, 20–33, 27–28
Pts: Bill Russell 17; Asts: Bill Russell 5	Pts: Dolph Schayes 32; Asts: Larry Costello 9
Series tied, 1–1

Onondaga War Memorial, Syracuse, New York
Attendance: 6,657

March 23

Boxscore

Syracuse Nationals 110, Boston Celtics 133
Scoring by quarter: 27–35, 25–31, 29–42, 29–25
Pts: Dick Barnett 22; Rebs: Red Kerr 11; Asts: Larry Costello 4	Pts: Bill Sharman 30; Rebs: Bill Russell 39; Asts: Bob Cousy 12
Boston leads series, 2–1

Boston Garden, Boston, Massachusetts
Attendance: 11,754

March 25

Boxscore

Boston Celtics 120, Syracuse Nationals 107
Scoring by quarter: 25–20, 32–25, 29–33, 34–29
Pts: Tom Heinsohn 22; Asts: Bob Cousy 9	Pts: Dolph Schayes 23; Asts: Barnett, Costello 4 each
Boston leads series, 3–1

Onondaga War Memorial, Syracuse, New York

March 26

Boxscore

Syracuse Nationals 101, Boston Celtics 123
Scoring by quarter: 25–23, 32–36, 26–29, 18–35
Pts: Dick Barnett 25; Rebs: Swede Halbrook 14; Asts: four players 4 each	Pts: Bill Sharman 27; Rebs: Bill Russell 33; Asts: Frank Ramsey 6
Boston wins series, 4–1

Boston Garden, Boston, Massachusetts
Attendance: 12,292

This was the eighth playoff meeting between these two teams, with the Nationals winning four of the first seven meetings.

Previous playoff series
Syracuse leads 4–3 in all-time playoff series

1953

Boston Celtics 2, Syracuse Nationals 0

1953 Eastern Division Semifinals

1954

Boston Celtics 0, Syracuse Nationals 2

1954 Eastern Division Round Robin Semifinals

1954

Boston Celtics 0, Syracuse Nationals 2

1954 Eastern Division Finals

1955

Boston Celtics 1, Syracuse Nationals 3

1955 Eastern Division Finals

1956

Boston Celtics 1, Syracuse Nationals 2

1956 Eastern Division Semifinals

1957

Boston Celtics 3, Syracuse Nationals 0

1957 Eastern Division Finals

1959

Boston Celtics 4, Syracuse Nationals 3

1959 Eastern Division Finals

=== Western Division Finals ===
==== (1) St. Louis Hawks vs. (2) Los Angeles Lakers ====
March 21

Boxscore

Los Angeles Lakers 122, St. Louis Hawks 118
Scoring by quarter: 34–29, 29–34, 27–27, 32–28
Pts: Elgin Baylor 44; Rebs: Elgin Baylor 14	Pts: Bob Pettit 28; Rebs: Bob Pettit 20
Los Angeles leads series, 1–0

Kiel Auditorium, St. Louis, Missouri
Attendance: 8,147

March 22

Boxscore

Los Angeles Lakers 106, St. Louis Hawks 121
Scoring by quarter: 25–31, 31–31, 22–30, 28–29
Pts: Elgin Baylor 35; Rebs: Elgin Baylor 9	Pts: Clyde Lovellette 28; Rebs: Bob Pettit 19
Series tied, 1–1

Kiel Auditorium, St. Louis, Missouri
Attendance: 8,472

March 24

Boxscore

St. Louis Hawks 112, Los Angeles Lakers 118
Scoring by quarter: 28–29, 22–31, 28–29, 34–29
Pts: Bob Pettit 26; Rebs: Bob Pettit 13	Pts: Elgin Baylor 25; Rebs: Elgin Baylor 18
Los Angeles leads series, 2–1

Los Angeles Memorial Sports Arena, Los Angeles, California
Attendance: 5,006

March 25

Boxscore

St. Louis Hawks 118, Los Angeles Lakers 117
Scoring by quarter: 28–26, 29–31, 31–29, 30–31
Pts: Bob Pettit 40; Rebs: Bob Pettit 18	Pts: Jerry West 33; Rebs: Elgin Baylor 15
Series tied, 2–2

Los Angeles Memorial Sports Arena, Los Angeles, California
Attendance: 4,923

March 27

Boxscore

Los Angeles Lakers 121, St. Louis Hawks 112
Scoring by quarter: 24–36, 33–25, 28–17, 36–34
Pts: Elgin Baylor 47; Rebs: Elgin Baylor 20	Pts: Cliff Hagan 26; Rebs: Bob Pettit 21
Los Angeles leads series, 3–2

Kiel Auditorium, St. Louis, Missouri

March 29

Boxscore

St. Louis Hawks 114, Los Angeles Lakers 113 (OT)
Scoring by quarter: 30–21, 29–23, 24–26, 17–30, Overtime: 14–13
Pts: Bob Pettit 31; Rebs: Bob Pettit 21	Pts: Elgin Baylor 39; Rebs: Elgin Baylor 21
Series tied, 3–3

Los Angeles Memorial Sports Arena, Los Angeles, California
Attendance: 14,840

April 1

Boxscore

Los Angeles Lakers 103, St. Louis Hawks 105
Scoring by quarter: 28–22, 20–27, 30–32, 25–24
Pts: Elgin Baylor 39; Rebs: Baylor, West 12 each	Pts: Bob Pettit 31; Rebs: Bob Pettit 17
St. Louis wins series, 4–3

Kiel Auditorium, St. Louis, Missouri

This was the fifth playoff meeting between these two teams, with the Hawks winning three of the first four meetings while the Lakers were based in Minneapolis.

Previous playoff series
St. Louis leads 3–1 in all-time playoff series

1956

St. Louis Hawks 2, Minneapolis Lakers 1

1956 Western Division Semifinals

1957

St. Louis Hawks 3, Minneapolis Lakers 0

1957 Western Division Finals

1959

St. Louis Hawks 2, Minneapolis Lakers 4

1959 Western Division Finals

1960

St. Louis Hawks 4, Minneapolis Lakers 3

1960 Western Division Finals

== NBA Finals: (E1) Boston Celtics vs. (W1) St. Louis Hawks ==
April 2

Boxscore

St. Louis Hawks 95, Boston Celtics 129
Scoring by quarter: 26–30, 22–26, 25–35, 22–38
Pts: Cliff Hagan 33; Rebs: Cliff Hagan 13; Asts: Hagan, Sauldsberry 4 each	Pts: Tom Heinsohn 26; Rebs: Bill Russell 31; Asts: Bob Cousy 7
Boston leads series, 1–0

Boston Garden, Boston, Massachusetts
Attendance: 11,531

April 5

Boxscore

St. Louis Hawks 108, Boston Celtics 116
Scoring by quarter: 32–27, 20–26, 23–31, 33–32
Pts: Cliff Hagan 40; Rebs: Bob Pettit 19; Asts: Cliff Hagan 6	Pts: Bob Cousy 26; Rebs: Bill Russell 28; Asts: Bob Cousy 14
Boston leads series, 2–0

Boston Garden, Boston, Massachusetts
Attendance: 13,909

April 8

Boxscore

Boston Celtics 120, St. Louis Hawks 124
Scoring by quarter: 31–28, 35–38, 31–32, 23–26
Pts: Russell, Heinsohn 24 each Rebs: Bill Russell 23; Asts: Bill Russell 9	Pts: Bob Pettit 31; Rebs: Bob Pettit 24; Asts: Si Green 7
Boston leads series, 2–1

Kiel Auditorium, St. Louis, Missouri
Attendance: 8,468

April 9

Boxscore

Boston Celtics 119, St. Louis Hawks 104
Scoring by quarter: 28–31, 24–25, 39–26, 28–22
Pts: Cousy, Sanders 22 each Rebs: Bill Russell 24; Asts: Bob Cousy 12	Pts: Bob Pettit 40; Rebs: Bob Pettit 18; Asts: Cliff Hagan 7
Boston leads series, 3–1

Kiel Auditorium, St. Louis, Missouri
Attendance: 10,442

April 11

Boxscore

St. Louis Hawks 112, Boston Celtics 121
Scoring by quarter: 39–33, 22–29, 23–37, 28–22
Pts: Bob Pettit 24; Rebs: Pettit, Sauldsberry 11 each Asts: Johnny McCarthy 6	Pts: Bill Russell 30; Rebs: Bill Russell 38; Asts: Bob Cousy 12
Boston wins series, 4–1

Boston Garden, Boston, Massachusetts
Attendance: 13,909

- Bill Sharman's final NBA game.

This was the fourth playoff meeting between these two teams, with the Celtics winning two of the first three meetings.

Previous playoff series
Boston leads 2–1 in all-time playoff series

1957

Boston Celtics 4, St. Louis Hawks 3

1957 NBA Finals

1958

Boston Celtics 2, St. Louis Hawks 4

1958 NBA Finals

1960

Boston Celtics 4, St. Louis Hawks 3

1960 NBA Finals
