= Swede Halbrook =

American basketball player (1933–1988)

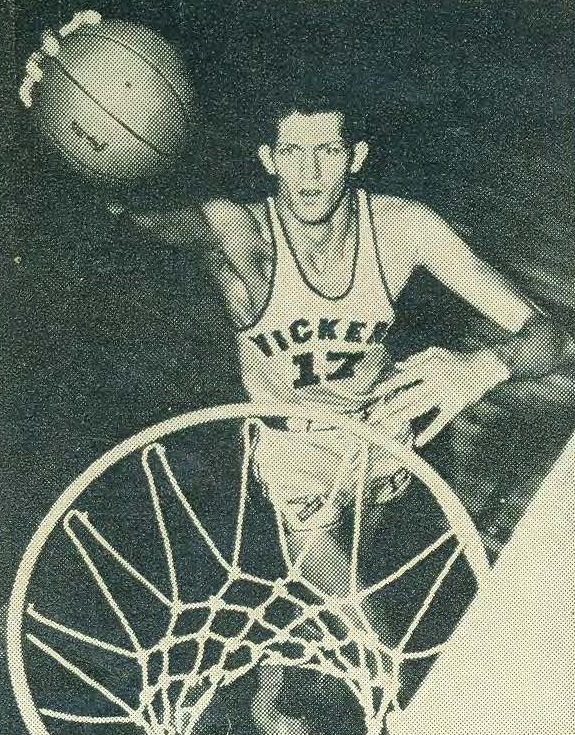
- Halbrook with the Wichita Vickers

Personal information
- Born: January 30, 1933 Dresden, Tennessee, U.S.
- Died: April 5, 1988 (aged 55) Portland, Oregon, U.S.
- Listed height: 7 ft 3 in (2.21 m)
- Listed weight: 235 lb (107 kg)

Career information
- High school: Lincoln (Portland, Oregon)
- College: Oregon State (1953–1955)
- NBA draft: 1956: 4th round, 28th overall pick
- Drafted by: Syracuse Nationals
- Playing career: 1955–1962
- Position: Center
- Number: 11

Career history
- 1955–1961: Wichita Vickers
- 1961–1962: Syracuse Nationals

Career highlights
- 2× All-PCC (1954, 1955)

Career NBA statistics
- Points: 786 (5.5 ppg)
- Rebounds: 949 (6.6 rpg)
- Assists: 64 (0.4 apg)
- Stats at NBA.com
- Stats at Basketball Reference

Harvey Wade "Swede" Halbrook (January 30, 1933 – April 5, 1988) was an American National Basketball Association (NBA) player from 1960 to 1962. He played in college for Oregon State University, and at 7 ft 3 in (2.21 m), was at the time the tallest player to ever play college and professional basketball.

== High school career ==
Swede Halbrook played high school basketball at Lincoln High School in Portland, Oregon, where he also starred in track as a high jumper and hurdler. Lincoln won the state tournament in Halbrook's senior year. In one tournament game, he scored 50 points and had 34 rebounds.

== College career ==
When Halbrook joined the Oregon State Beavers, Life magazine declared him the "World's Tallest Basketball Player" in their January 18, 1954, issue. Under head coach Slats Gill, he instantly turned the team into a national title contender, earning All-American status in 1955 and All-Pacific Coast Conference first team and All-Northern Division first-team honors in 1954 and 1955, the only two seasons he played. As of 2006, he still holds the top three spots on Oregon State's single-game rebound records, his top performance of 36 being tied for 15th in NCAA history. He also holds the Oregon State record for free throws attempted at 28.

== Professional career ==
Halbrook joined the Wichita Vickers of the National Industrial Basketball League in 1955. He played six seasons and led the team to the national AAU title in 1959. The next year, he was selected to play for the Syracuse Nationals.

Halbrook played in 79 games in the 1960–61 season, which saw the third-place Nationals earn an NBA playoffs berth. The rookie was a major factor in several games, none moreso than in the Eastern Conference semi-finals, where the Nats swept a hard-fought, three-game series against sophomore sensation Wilt Chamberlain and the Philadelphia Warriors. Halbook was particularly effective in the first two games. In the series opener, he contributed 15 points and 15 rebounds in a 115–108 triumph at home. The big guy followed with 12 points and a dozen rebounds in a 115-114 road victory. Meanwhile, the center tandem of Halbrook and veteran Johnny Kerr held Chamberlain below his regular-season averages at the other end. As Syracuse coach Alex Hannum told the Oregonian, "Wilt was really concerned with Swede ... Wilt never had to look anyone in the eye and he would get more involved in trying to outplay Swede than he would in trying to win the game."

The following season, Halbrook played in 64 games for the Nationals, that season marking the end of his professional career. He remained the tallest player in NBA history until the 1982 draft brought Mark Eaton and Chuck Nevitt into the league.

== Personal life ==
Off-court issues cut short both Halbrook's college and professional careers. He would reportedly go missing for days, sometimes weeks at a time without explanation. Oregon State coach Gill was forced to cut him from the team after only two seasons for skipping class so often. Nationals coach Hannum is quoted to have said that "He could have had a worthwhile career if he had taken care of himself. During his second season, he disappeared for a week and we sent the police out to look for him. But they couldn’t find a 7-footer! He came back on his own but he never would tell me where he had been."

Swede moved back to Portland, Oregon after being released from the Nationals and worked at a variety of odd jobs for the remainder of his life. In later life, he worked as a circus clown and was given the title of the "World's Tallest Clown". He died of a heart attack on April 5, 1988, on a Portland city bus.

== Career statistics ==
Legend
GP	Games played	GS	Games started	MPG	Minutes per game
FG%	Field goal percentage	3P%	3-point field goal percentage	FT%	Free throw percentage
RPG	Rebounds per game	APG	Assists per game	SPG	Steals per game
BPG	Blocks per game	PPG	Points per game	**Bold**	Career high
*	Led the league

=== NBA ===
==== Regular season ====
Year	Team	GP	MPG	FG%	FT%	RPG	APG	PPG
1960–61	Syracuse	**79***	**14.3**	.335	.543	**7.0**	.4	4.9
1961–62	Syracuse	64	14.2	**.360**	.636	6.2	**.5**	**6.3**
Career		143	14.3	.347	.591	6.6	.4	5.5

==== Playoffs ====
Year	Team	GP	MPG	FG%	FT%	RPG	APG	PPG
1961	Syracuse	8	21.5	.333	.700	10.4	1.5	7.8

== See also ==
- List of tallest players in National Basketball Association history
- List of NCAA Division I men's basketball players with 30 or more rebounds in a game
