= 1960–61 Syracuse Nationals season =

Season for the Nationals in the National Basketball Association

- Head coach: Alex Hannum
- Arena: Onondaga War Memorial

Results
- Record: 38–41 (.481)
- Place: Division: 3rd (Eastern)
- Playoff finish: East Division Finals (eliminated 1–4)
- Stats at Basketball Reference

The 1960–61 Syracuse Nationals season was the Nationals' 12th season in the NBA. The team also hosted the 11th NBA All-Star Game held on January 17, 1961.

== Roster ==
1960-61 Syracuse Nationals roster
Players

Pos.	No.	Player	Height	Weight	DOB	From
G/F	5	Dick Barnett	6 ft 4 in (1.93 m)	190 lb (86 kg)	1936-10-02	Tennessee State
G/F	3	Ernie Beck	6 ft 4 in (1.93 m)	190 lb (86 kg)	1931-12-11	Penn
G	24	Al Bianchi	6 ft 3 in (1.91 m)	185 lb (84 kg)	1932-03-26	Bowling Green
F	23	Barney Cable	6 ft 7 in (2.01 m)	175 lb (79 kg)	1935-07-29	Bradley
G	21	Larry Costello	6 ft 1 in (1.85 m)	185 lb (84 kg)	1931-07-02	Niagara
F	20	Dave Gambee	6 ft 6 in (1.98 m)	215 lb (98 kg)	1937-04-16	Oregon State
G/F	15	Hal Greer	6 ft 2 in (1.88 m)	175 lb (79 kg)	1936-06-26	Marshall
C	11	Swede Halbrook	7 ft 3 in (2.21 m)	230 lb (104 kg)	1933-01-30	Oregon State
F/C	10	Johnny Kerr	6 ft 9 in (2.06 m)	230 lb (104 kg)	1932-08-17	Illinois
F	3	Cal Ramsey	6 ft 4 in (1.93 m)	200 lb (91 kg)	1937-07-13	NYU
F	12	Joe Roberts	6 ft 6 in (1.98 m)	214 lb (97 kg)	1936-05-18	Ohio State
F/C	4	Dolph Schayes	6 ft 7 in (2.01 m)	195 lb (88 kg)	1928-05-19	NYU

Coaches
Head coach

Alex Hannum

Legend
- (DP) Unsigned draft pick
- (FA) Free agent
- (S) Suspended
- Injured

Roster

== Regular season ==
=== Season standings ===
Eastern Division	W	L	PCT	GB	Home	Road	Neutral	Div
x-Boston Celtics	57	22	.722	–	21–7	24–11	12–4	28–11
x-Philadelphia Warriors	46	33	.582	11	23–6	12–21	11–6	22–17
x-Syracuse Nationals	38	41	.481	19	19–9	8–21	11–11	18–21
New York Knicks	21	58	.266	36	10–22	7–25	4–11	10–29

x – clinched playoff spot

=== Game log ===
1960–61 Game log
#	Date	Opponent	Score	High points	Record
1	October 22	Philadelphia	133–123	Hal Greer (28)	0–1
2	October 25	@ St. Louis	100–123	Dolph Schayes (26)	0–2
3	October 27	@ Cincinnati	140–143 (OT)	Dick Barnett (30)	0–3
4	October 29	Los Angeles	118–125	Dolph Schayes (32)	1–3
5	November 5	@ Los Angeles	110–112	Johnny Kerr (21)	1–4
6	November 6	N Los Angeles	113–119	Dolph Schayes (31)	1–5
7	November 11	@ New York	108–112	Dick Barnett (26)	1–6
8	November 12	New York	117–128	Dolph Schayes (34)	2–6
9	November 16	Cincinnati	87–124	Hal Greer (22)	3–6
10	November 17	@ Philadelphia	106–105	Dolph Schayes (22)	4–6
11	November 19	Boston	114–94	Dolph Schayes (30)	4–7
12	November 23	@ Detroit	115–122	Hal Greer (31)	4–8
13	November 24	@ St. Louis	97–132	Hal Greer (20)	4–9
14	November 26	@ Boston	110–129	Dick Barnett (25)	4–10
15	November 29	N Cincinnati	129–105	Dolph Schayes (28)	5–10
16	November 30	N St. Louis	135–126	Hal Greer (35)	6–10
17	December 1	@ Cincinnati	137–126	Dolph Schayes (35)	7–10
18	December 3	New York	113–130	Hal Greer (25)	8–10
19	December 6	N Philadelphia	107–113	Dolph Schayes (23)	8–11
20	December 7	@ Boston	142–134	Dolph Schayes (40)	9–11
21	December 9	N St. Louis	118–131	Dick Barnett (25)	9–12
22	December 10	@ Detroit	117–107	Costello, Greer, Schayes (22)	10–12
23	December 11	Philadelphia	121–132	Dolph Schayes (33)	11–12
24	December 13	N Cincinnati	107–105	Dolph Schayes (32)	12–12
25	December 15	N Boston	105–115	Dolph Schayes (26)	12–13
26	December 18	St. Louis	104–103	Gambee, Kerr, Schayes (18)	12–14
27	December 20	@ New York	112–122	Larry Costello (32)	12–15
28	December 25	New York	100–162	Gambee, Greer (24)	13–15
29	December 26	@ St. Louis	112–133	Hal Greer (26)	13–16
30	December 27	@ Cincinnati	124–129	Dolph Schayes (28)	13–17
31	December 28	Los Angeles	113–115	Dolph Schayes (38)	14–17
32	December 30	N Detroit	112–121	Costello, Kerr (21)	14–18
33	January 1	Boston	113–96	Dick Barnett (22)	14–19
34	January 2	N Cincinnati	125–126	Dolph Schayes (27)	14–20
35	January 3	@ New York	129–104	Hal Greer (31)	15–20
36	January 4	Cincinnati	134–126	Dick Barnett (32)	15–21
37	January 5	@ Philadelphia	127–139	Dick Barnett (34)	15–22
38	January 7	N New York	117–120	Dolph Schayes (36)	15–23
39	January 8	Detroit	115–138	Dick Barnett (36)	16–23
40	January 11	St. Louis	128–133	Dolph Schayes (35)	17–23
41	January 12	N Boston	118–124 (OT)	Dick Barnett (33)	17–24
42	January 13	N New York	106–105	Johnny Kerr (21)	18–24
43	January 15	Philadelphia	113–116	Dolph Schayes (35)	19–24
44	January 18	N Philadelphia	129–118	Greer, Schayes (30)	20–24
45	January 21	Boston	124–127	Dick Barnett (30)	21–24
46	January 22	N Los Angeles	112–109	Dick Barnett (27)	22–24
47	January 24	@ Los Angeles	107–116	Dolph Schayes (19)	22–25
48	January 25	@ Los Angeles	112–117	Dick Barnett (23)	22–26
49	January 27	@ Cincinnati	138–126	Dolph Schayes (28)	23–26
50	January 29	@ St. Louis	108–125	Dolph Schayes (26)	23–27
51	January 31	@ New York	122–106	Hal Greer (34)	24–27
52	February 1	Philadelphia	122–113	Barnett, Schayes (24)	24–28
53	February 3	@ Detroit	118–121	Dolph Schayes (36)	24–29
54	February 4	N Detroit	104–111	Dolph Schayes (25)	24–30
55	February 5	Cincinnati	115–129	Dick Barnett (34)	25–30
56	February 8	Boston	108–130	Dolph Schayes (28)	26–30
57	February 9	@ Philadelphia	136–126	Larry Costello (24)	27–30
58	February 11	N Detroit	141–111	Dolph Schayes (26)	28–30
59	February 12	Detroit	122–148	Hal Greer (34)	29–30
60	February 15	@ New York	127–129 (OT)	Dick Barnett (24)	29–31
61	February 16	New York	120–132	Hal Greer (32)	30–31
62	February 17	N Detroit	115–113	Costello, Greer (19)	31–31
63	February 18	N Philadelphia	129–110	Dolph Schayes (29)	32–31
64	February 19	Boston	116–106	Dolph Schayes (23)	32–32
65	February 20	N Los Angeles	126–121	Dolph Schayes (29)	33–32
66	February 21	N Detroit	123–118	Dolph Schayes (33)	34–32
67	February 23	St. Louis	116–144	Hal Greer (34)	35–32
68	February 24	@ Boston	128–144	Larry Costello (25)	35–33
69	February 26	New York	110–136	Dave Gambee (23)	36–33
70	March 1	Philadelphia	128–149	Dolph Schayes (24)	37–33
71	March 2	N Los Angeles	110–114	Larry Costello (24)	37–34
72	March 3	N Philadelphia	116–123	Dave Gambee (23)	37–35
73	March 4	@ Philadelphia	115–116	Dolph Schayes (21)	37–36
74	March 5	Los Angeles	125–114	Hal Greer (26)	37–37
75	March 7	@ New York	113–114	Barnett, Kerr (22)	37–38
76	March 8	@ Boston	127–136	Costello, Kerr (20)	37–39
77	March 9	St. Louis	119–129	Dolph Schayes (28)	38–39
78	March 11	@ Boston	116–126	Dolph Schayes (24)	38–40
79	March 12	Boston	136–134 (OT)	Dolph Schayes (33)	38–41

== Playoffs ==
1961 playoff game log
Division Semifinals: 3–0 (home: 1–0; road: 2–0)

Game	Date	Team	Score	High points	High rebounds	High assists	Location Attendance	Series
1	March 14	@ Philadelphia	W 115–107	Larry Costello (28)	Swede Halbrook (15)	Larry Costello (11)	Philadelphia Civic Center; 4,391	1–0
2	March 16	Philadelphia	W 115–114	Hal Greer (26)	Dolph Schayes (14)	Larry Costello (6)	Onondaga War Memorial; 5,304	2–0
3	March 18	@ Philadelphia	W 106–103	Larry Costello (20)	Red Kerr (18)	Larry Costello (8)	Philadelphia Civic Center	3–0

Division Finals: 1–4 (home: 1–1; road: 0–3)

Game	Date	Team	Score	High points	High rebounds	High assists	Location Attendance	Series
1	March 19	@ Boston	L 115–128	Dolph Schayes (26)	—	Schayes, Costello (6)	Boston Garden; 7,728	0–1
2	March 21	Boston	W 115–98	Dolph Schayes (32)	—	Larry Costello (9)	Onondaga War Memorial; 6,657	1–1
3	March 23	@ Boston	L 110–133	Dick Barnett (22)	Red Kerr (11)	Larry Costello (4)	Boston Garden; 11,754	1–2
4	March 25	Boston	L 107–120	Dolph Schayes (23)	—	Barnett, Costello (4)	Onondaga War Memorial	1–3
5	March 26	@ Boston	L 101–123	Dick Barnett (25)	Swede Halbrook (14)	four players tied (4)	Boston Garden; 12,292	1–4

1961 schedule

== Awards and records ==
- Dolph Schayes, All-NBA Second Team
- Larry Costello, All-NBA Second Team
