= 1960–61 St. Louis Hawks season =

NBA professional basketball team season

- Division champions
- Head coach: Paul Seymour
- Arena: Kiel Auditorium

Results
- Record: 51–28 (.646)
- Place: Division: 1st (Western)
- Playoff finish: NBA Finals (Boston Celtics1–4)

Local media
- Television: KPLR-TV; Bud Blattner, Jerry Gross and Slater Martin
- Radio: KMOX; Blattner, Gross and Martin

For the 1960–61 Saint Louis Hawks season owner Ben Kerner changed coaches despite reaching the 1960 NBA Finals. Ed Macauley was replaced with Paul Seymour. On the court, rookie Lenny Wilkens was averaging 11.7 points per game in his first year. The brunt of the scoring came from the Hawks' front line of Bob Pettit, Cliff Hagan, and Clyde Lovellette. They combined for 72.0 points per game, and the Hawks won the West by 15 games. The Hawks finished the season with a record of 51–28. In the playoffs, the Hawks needed a 1-point overtime win in Game 6 on the road to force a 7th game with the Los Angeles Lakers. Game 7 was played in St. Louis and the Hawks beat the Lakers by 2 points. The Hawks then were up against the Boston Celtics in the NBA Finals. The Hawks fell in 5 games as the Celtics won their 4th NBA Title in 5 seasons.

== Roster ==
1960–61 St. Louis Hawks roster
Players

Pos.	No.	Player	Height	Weight	DOB	From
SG	12	Ernie Beck	6 ft 4 in (1.93 m)	190 lb (86 kg)	1931-12-11	Penn
SG	11	Al Ferrari	6 ft 4 in (1.93 m)	190 lb (86 kg)	1933–07–06	Michigan State
C	13	Larry Foust	6 ft 9 in (2.06 m)	215 lb (98 kg)	1928–06–24	La Salle
PG	17	Si Green	6 ft 2 in (1.88 m)	185 lb (84 kg)	1933–08–20	Duquesne
SF	16	Cliff Hagan	6 ft 4 in (1.93 m)	210 lb (95 kg)	1931–12–09	Kentucky
SF	19	Fred LaCour	6 ft 5 in (1.96 m)	210 lb (95 kg)	1938-02-07	San Francisco
C	34	Clyde Lovellette	6 ft 9 in (2.06 m)	234 lb (106 kg)	1929–09–07	Kansas
SG	15	Johnny McCarthy	6 ft 1 in (1.85 m)	185 lb (84 kg)	1934–04–25	Canisius
PF	9	Bob Pettit	6 ft 9 in (2.06 m)	205 lb (93 kg)	1932–12–12	LSU
SG	25	Dave Piontek	6 ft 6 in (1.98 m)	230 lb (104 kg)	1934–08–27	Xavier
G	12	Phil Rollins	6 ft 2 in (1.88 m)	185 lb (84 kg)	1934-01-19	Louisville
PF	21	Woody Sauldsberry	6 ft 7 in (2.01 m)	220 lb (100 kg)	1934-07-11	Texas Southern
PG	32	Lenny Wilkens	6 ft 1 in (1.85 m)	180 lb (82 kg)	1937-10-28	Providence

Coaches
Head coach

Paul Seymour

Legend
- (DP) Unsigned draft pick
- (FA) Free agent
- (S) Suspended
- Injured

Roster

== Regular season ==
=== Standings ===
Western Division	W	L	PCT	GB	Home	Road	Neutral	Div
x-St. Louis Hawks	51	28	.646	–	29–5	15–20	7–3	25–14
x-Los Angeles Lakers	36	43	.456	15	16–12	8–20	12–11	19–20
x-Detroit Pistons	34	45	.430	17	20–11	3–19	11–15	18–21
Cincinnati Royals	33	46	.418	18	18–13	8–19	7–14	16–23

=== Game log ===
1960–61 Game log
#	Date	Opponent	Score	High points	Record
1	October 22	Los Angeles	96–112	Clyde Lovellette (28)	1–0
2	October 23	@ Cincinnati	103–114	Cliff Hagan (25)	1–1
3	October 25	Syracuse	100–123	Bob Pettit (35)	2–1
4	October 29	Cincinnati	97–113	Green, Pettit (19)	3–1
5	November 2	@ Detroit	132–117	Bob Pettit (22)	4–1
6	November 5	New York	104–119	Cliff Hagan (35)	5–1
7	November 9	Detroit	120–126	Bob Pettit (39)	6–1
8	November 11	@ Philadelphia	112–117	Cliff Hagan (22)	6–2
9	November 12	Philadelphia	105–107	Clyde Lovellette (24)	7–2
10	November 16	@ Boston	106–124	Bob Pettit (22)	7–3
11	November 17	N Detroit	112–105	Hagan, Lovellette, Pettit (26)	8–3
12	November 18	@ Cincinnati	128–129 (OT)	Cliff Hagan (36)	8–4
13	November 19	Cincinnati	120–121	Clyde Lovellette (33)	9–4
14	November 22	@ New York	120–119	Clyde Lovellette (32)	10–4
15	November 24	Syracuse	97–132	Bob Pettit (31)	11–4
16	November 26	Los Angeles	113–126	Bob Pettit (41)	12–4
17	November 29	Boston	119–109	Cliff Hagan (26)	12–5
18	November 30	N Syracuse	135–126	Bob Pettit (32)	12–6
19	December 2	@ New York	139–133 (OT)	Bob Pettit (44)	13–6
20	December 3	@ Philadelphia	131–127	Bob Pettit (37)	14–6
21	December 6	Detroit	110–146	Hagan, Lovellette (18)	15–6
22	December 7	@ Detroit	83–113	Bob Pettit (13)	15–7
23	December 9	N Syracuse	118–131	Bob Pettit (36)	16–7
24	December 10	Los Angeles	108–111	Bob Pettit (30)	17–7
25	December 12	@ Los Angeles	114–103	Bob Pettit (32)	18–7
26	December 14	@ Los Angeles	113–124	Cliff Hagan (23)	18–8
27	December 16	N Philadelphia	112–107	Clyde Lovellette (24)	19–8
28	December 17	New York	103–116	Bob Pettit (36)	20–8
29	December 18	@ Syracuse	104–103	Bob Pettit (26)	21–8
30	December 21	@ Boston	108–120	Bob Pettit (37)	21–9
31	December 26	Syracuse	112–133	Bob Pettit (25)	22–9
32	December 28	Boston	99–105	Bob Pettit (35)	23–9
33	December 29	@ Detroit	89–112	Hagan, Pettit (19)	23–10
34	December 30	Los Angeles	99–107	Cliff Hagan (28)	24–10
35	January 1	@ Cincinnati	112–114	McCarthy, Pettit (25)	24–11
36	January 5	@ Los Angeles	96–110	Bob Pettit (23)	24–12
37	January 6	@ Los Angeles	108–104	Bob Pettit (35)	25–12
38	January 8	Boston	104–133	Cliff Hagan (37)	26–12
39	January 10	Cincinnati	110–119	Cliff Hagan (33)	27–12
40	January 11	@ Syracuse	128–133	Clyde Lovellette (31)	27–13
41	January 12	@ Philadelphia	102–111	Clyde Lovellette (29)	27–14
42	January 14	Detroit	113–135	Cliff Hagan (31)	28–14
43	January 15	@ Detroit	122–137	Bob Pettit (31)	28–15
44	January 18	@ Boston	125–114	Bob Pettit (37)	29–15
45	January 19	@ Philadelphia	127–129	Bob Pettit (42)	29–16
46	January 21	New York	122–145	Bob Pettit (45)	30–16
47	January 22	@ Cincinnati	108–115	Bob Pettit (26)	30–17
48	January 24	Philadelphia	112–114	Bob Pettit (37)	31–17
49	January 25	N New York	116–109	Clyde Lovellette (25)	32–17
50	January 28	Cincinnati	116–136	Cliff Hagan (32)	33–17
51	January 29	Syracuse	108–125	Lovellette, Pettit (25)	34–17
52	January 31	Boston	109–103	Bob Pettit (26)	34–18
53	February 1	N Detroit	137–131	Cliff Hagan (33)	35–18
54	February 2	N Los Angeles	115–116	Bob Pettit (25)	35–19
55	February 4	@ New York	128–111	Lenny Wilkens (24)	36–19
56	February 5	@ Boston	121–123	Bob Pettit (35)	36–20
57	February 7	Philadelphia	124–127	Bob Pettit (35)	37–20
58	February 8	@ Los Angeles	103–120	Clyde Lovellette (23)	37–21
59	February 9	@ Los Angeles	123–113	Bob Pettit (40)	38–21
60	February 11	Cincinnati	122–123	Lenny Wilkens (28)	39–21
61	February 12	Los Angeles	105–95	Cliff Hagan (25)	39–22
62	February 14	Detroit	134–135	Cliff Hagan (38)	40–22
63	February 15	N Philadelphia	135–98	Bob Pettit (26)	41–22
64	February 16	@ Cincinnati	107–133	Bob Pettit (30)	41–23
65	February 18	@ Detroit	141–138	Bob Pettit (57)	42–23
66	February 19	New York	123–100	Bob Pettit (26)	42–24
67	February 21	Cincinnati	114–126	Cliff Hagan (31)	43–24
68	February 23	@ Syracuse	116–144	Clyde Lovellette (26)	43–25
69	February 24	@ New York	122–119	Lenny Wilkens (29)	44–25
70	February 25	Boston	122–109	Bob Pettit (31)	44–26
71	February 26	@ Cincinnati	148–122	Clyde Lovellette (30)	45–26
72	February 28	N Cincinnati	105–131	Al Ferrari (18)	45–27
73	March 1	@ Boston	110–97	Lenny Wilkens (23)	46–27
74	March 4	Detroit	102–104	Clyde Lovellette (27)	47–27
75	March 5	@ Detroit	127–122	Cliff Hagan (30)	48–27
76	March 7	Los Angeles	136–137 (2OT)	Bob Pettit (48)	49–27
77	March 8	N New York	117–94	Bob Pettit (21)	50–27
78	March 9	@ Syracuse	119–129	Hagan, Pettit (34)	50–28
79	March 11	Philadelphia	87–130	Cliff Hagan (24)	51–28

== Playoffs ==
1961 playoff game log
Division Finals: 4–3 (home: 2–2; road: 2–1)

Game	Date	Team	Score	High points	High rebounds	Location Attendance	Series
1	March 21	Los Angeles	L 118–122	Bob Pettit (28)	Bob Pettit (20)	Kiel Auditorium; 8,147	0–1
2	March 22	Los Angeles	W 121–106	Clyde Lovellette (28)	Bob Pettit (19)	Kiel Auditorium; 8,472	1–1
3	March 24	@ Los Angeles	L 112–118	Bob Pettit (26)	Bob Pettit (13)	Los Angeles Memorial Sports Arena; 5,006	1–2
4	March 25	@ Los Angeles	W 118–117	Bob Pettit (40)	Bob Pettit (18)	Los Angeles Memorial Sports Arena; 4,923	2–2
5	March 27	Los Angeles	L 112–121	Cliff Hagan (26)	Bob Pettit (21)	Kiel Auditorium	2–3
6	March 29	@ Los Angeles	W 114–113 (OT)	Bob Pettit (31)	Bob Pettit (21)	Los Angeles Memorial Sports Arena; 14,840	3–3
7	April 1	Los Angeles	W 105–103	Bob Pettit (31)	Bob Pettit (17)	Kiel Auditorium	4–3

NBA Finals: 1–4 (home: 1–1; road: 0–3)

Game	Date	Team	Score	High points	High rebounds	High assists	Location Attendance	Series
1	April 2	@ Boston	L 95–129	Cliff Hagan (33)	Cliff Hagan (13)	Hagan, Sauldsberry (4)	Boston Garden; 11,531	0–1
2	April 5	@ Boston	L 108–116	Cliff Hagan (40)	Bob Pettit (19)	Cliff Hagan (6)	Boston Garden; 13,909	0–2
3	April 8	Boston	W 124–120	Bob Pettit (31)	Bob Pettit (24)	Si Green (7)	Kiel Auditorium; 8,468	1–2
4	April 9	Boston	L 104–119	Bob Pettit (40)	Bob Pettit (18)	Cliff Hagan (7)	Kiel Auditorium; 10,442	1–3
5	April 11	@ Boston	L 112–121	Bob Pettit (24)	Pettit, Sauldsberry (11)	Johnny McCarthy (6)	Boston Garden; 13,909	1–4

1961 schedule

== Awards and honors ==
- Bob Pettit, All-NBA First Team
