= 1960–61 Los Angeles Lakers season =

Season of NBA team the Los Angeles Lakers

- Head coach: Fred Schaus
- Arena: Los Angeles Memorial Sports Arena

Results
- Record: 36–43 (.456)
- Place: Division: 2nd (Western)
- Playoff finish: Division finals (lost to Hawks 3–4)
- Stats at Basketball Reference
- Radio: KHJ (Bill Brundige, 3 December games); KNX (AM) (Chick Hearn, playoffs)

The 1960–61 Los Angeles Lakers season was the franchise's 13th season in the NBA and first season in Los Angeles, following their off-season relocation from the Twin Cities of Minnesota. The Lakers finished in second place in the NBA Western Division during the 1960–61 NBA season, with a record of 36–43, 15 games behind the St. Louis Hawks. The Lakers qualified for the Western Division playoffs, defeating the Detroit Pistons, three games to two in the semifinals, before losing again to the Hawks in the West Finals, four games to three.

== Roster ==
1960–61 Los Angeles Lakers roster
Players

Pos.	No.	Player	Height	Weight	DOB	From
SF	22	Elgin Baylor	6 ft 5 in (1.96 m)	225 lb (102 kg)	1934-09-16	Seattle
C	14	Ray Felix	6 ft 11 in (2.11 m)	220 lb (100 kg)	1930-12-10	Long Island
SF	20	Tom Hawkins	6 ft 5 in (1.96 m)	210 lb (95 kg)	1936-12-22	Notre Dame
SG	33	Hot Rod Hundley	6 ft 4 in (1.93 m)	185 lb (84 kg)	1934-10-26	West Virginia
PF	54	Howie Jolliff	6 ft 7 in (2.01 m)	218 lb (99 kg)	1938-07-20	Ohio
C	32	Jim Krebs	6 ft 8 in (2.03 m)	230 lb (104 kg)	1935-09-08	SMU
PF	35	Rudy LaRusso	6 ft 7 in (2.01 m)	220 lb (100 kg)	1937-11-11	Dartmouth
PG	21	Slick Leonard	6 ft 3 in (1.91 m)	185 lb (84 kg)	1932-07-17	Indiana
SG	11	Frank Selvy	6 ft 3 in (1.91 m)	180 lb (82 kg)	1932-11-09	Furman
PG	44	Jerry West	6 ft 3 in (1.91 m)	175 lb (79 kg)	1938-05-28	West Virginia

Coaches
Head coach
- Fred Schaus

Legend
- (DP) Unsigned draft pick
- (FA) Free agent
- (S) Suspended
- Injured

Roster
Updated: December 15, 1960

== Regular season ==
=== Season standings ===
Western Division	W	L	PCT	GB	Home	Road	Neutral	Div
x-St. Louis Hawks	51	28	.646	–	29–5	15–20	7–3	25–14
x-Los Angeles Lakers	36	43	.456	15	16–12	8–20	12–11	19–20
x-Detroit Pistons	34	45	.430	17	20–11	3–19	11–15	18–21
Cincinnati Royals	33	46	.418	18	18–13	8–19	7–14	16–23

x – clinched playoff spot

=== Game log ===
1960–61 game log
#	Date	Opponent	Score	High points	Record
1	October 19	@ Cincinnati	123–140	Elgin Baylor (35)	0–1
2	October 22	@ St. Louis	96–112	Rudy LaRusso (28)	0–2
3	October 24	New York	111–101	Elgin Baylor (25)	0–3
4	October 25	New York	118–120	Elgin Baylor (36)	1–3
5	October 28	@ Philadelphia	120–122	Elgin Baylor (28)	1–4
6	October 29	@ Syracuse	118–125	Elgin Baylor (31)	1–5
7	November 2	N New York	96–106	Elgin Baylor (30)	2–5
8	November 5	Syracuse	110–112	Elgin Baylor (40)	3–5
9	November 6	N Syracuse	113–119	Hot Rod Hundley (29)	4–5
10	November 9	N Philadelphia	125–118	Elgin Baylor (40)	4–6
11	November 12	N Boston	124–131	Elgin Baylor (45)	4–7
12	November 15	@ New York	123–108	Elgin Baylor (71)	5–7
13	November 19	Detroit	122–130	Elgin Baylor (35)	6–7
14	November 20	N Detroit	135–131	Elgin Baylor (52)	7–7
15	November 22	N Cincinnati	133–118	Elgin Baylor (41)	8–7
16	November 23	@ Cincinnati	118–122	Elgin Baylor (37)	8–8
17	November 24	N Cincinnati	108–100	Elgin Baylor (33)	9–8
18	November 25	@ Detroit	141–128 (OT)	Elgin Baylor (51)	10–8
19	November 26	@ St. Louis	113–126	Hot Rod Hundley (22)	10–9
20	November 27	Philadelphia	113–106	Jim Krebs (25)	10–10
21	November 28	Philadelphia	112–137	Elgin Baylor (42)	11–10
22	November 29	N Philadelphia	122–121	Hot Rod Hundley (30)	11–11
23	December 1	@ Philadelphia	114–117	Elgin Baylor (28)	11–12
24	December 2	@ Boston	120–117	Elgin Baylor (23)	12–12
25	December 4	Boston	113–103	Elgin Baylor (40)	12–13
26	December 5	Boston	123–101	Elgin Baylor (43)	12–14
27	December 7	@ Cincinnati	112–114	Elgin Baylor (25)	12–15
28	December 10	@ St. Louis	108–111	Elgin Baylor (34)	12–16
29	December 12	St. Louis	114–103	Jerry West (26)	12–17
30	December 14	St. Louis	113–124	Elgin Baylor (28)	13–17
31	December 16	@ Cincinnati	116–130	Elgin Baylor (34)	13–18
32	December 17	@ Boston	112–140	Elgin Baylor (29)	13–19
33	December 19	N Detroit	107–103	Elgin Baylor (39)	14–19
34	December 20	N Detroit	94–97	Elgin Baylor (37)	14–20
35	December 26	@ New York	112–119	Elgin Baylor (44)	14–21
36	December 28	@ Syracuse	113–115	Elgin Baylor (39)	14–22
37	December 29	N New York	95–111	Elgin Baylor (28)	15–22
38	December 30	@ St. Louis	99–107	Elgin Baylor (23)	15–23
39	January 1	@ Detroit	105–116	Elgin Baylor (39)	15–24
40	January 2	N Detroit	123–113	Elgin Baylor (46)	16–24
41	January 3	Boston	102–96	Elgin Baylor (40)	16–25
42	January 5	St. Louis	96–110	Elgin Baylor (26)	17–25
43	January 6	St. Louis	108–104	Elgin Baylor (27)	17–26
44	January 10	New York	104–117	Elgin Baylor (35)	18–26
45	January 11	New York	109–104	Elgin Baylor (39)	18–27
46	January 14	Cincinnati	114–123	Elgin Baylor (45)	19–27
47	January 15	Cincinnati	109–105	Elgin Baylor (37)	19–28
48	January 19	N Boston	103–106	Elgin Baylor (29)	19–29
49	January 21	@ Philadelphia	111–136	Elgin Baylor (27)	19–30
50	January 22	N Syracuse	112–109	Elgin Baylor (38)	19–31
51	January 24	Syracuse	107–116	Elgin Baylor (56)	20–31
52	January 25	Syracuse	112–117	Elgin Baylor (27)	21–31
53	January 29	Detroit	113–137	Elgin Baylor (34)	22–31
54	January 30	Detroit	116–117	Elgin Baylor (28)	23–31
55	January 31	N Detroit	112–121	Elgin Baylor (47)	23–32
56	February 2	N St. Louis	115–116	Rudy LaRusso (35)	24–32
57	February 5	@ Detroit	125–120	Elgin Baylor (45)	25–32
58	February 6	N Cincinnati	110–101	Elgin Baylor (35)	26–32
59	February 7	N Boston	95–96	Jerry West (29)	26–33
60	February 8	St. Louis	103–120	Tom Hawkins (32)	27–33
61	February 9	St. Louis	123–113	Elgin Baylor (45)	27–34
62	February 12	St. Louis	105–95	Elgin Baylor (31)	28–34
63	February 13	N Cincinnati	100–104	Elgin Baylor (31)	28–35
64	February 14	N Boston	93–113	Jerry West (21)	28–36
65	February 16	@ Detroit	129–106	Elgin Baylor (57)	29–36
66	February 18	@ New York	121–106	Baylor, Selvy (28)	30–36
67	February 19	@ Cincinnati	106–112	Rudy LaRusso (29)	30–37
68	February 20	N Syracuse	126–121	Elgin Baylor (45)	30–38
69	February 22	Boston	93–105	Elgin Baylor (38)	31–38
70	February 26	Philadelphia	116–121	Jerry West (38)	32–38
71	February 27	Philadelphia	113–88	Rudy LaRusso (26)	32–39
72	February 28	@ Philadelphia	108–123	Hot Rod Hundley (33)	32–40
73	March 1	N New York	107–144	Elgin Baylor (27)	33–40
74	March 2	N Syracuse	110–114	Elgin Baylor (34)	34–40
75	March 5	@ Syracuse	125–114	Elgin Baylor (37)	35–40
76	March 7	@ St. Louis	136–137 (2OT)	Elgin Baylor (39)	35–41
77	March 8	@ Detroit	103–120	Baylor, West (20)	35–42
78	March 11	Cincinnati	108–105	Elgin Baylor (27)	35–43
79	March 12	Cincinnati	122–123	Elgin Baylor (49)	36–43

== Playoffs ==
1961 playoff game log
Division semifinals: 3–2 (home: 3–0; road: 0–2)

Game	Date	Team	Score	High points	High rebounds	Location Attendance	Series
1	March 14	Detroit	W 120–102	Elgin Baylor (40)	Ray Felix (21)	Los Angeles Memorial Sports Arena	1–0
2	March 15	Detroit	W 127–118	Elgin Baylor (49)	Elgin Baylor (21)	Los Angeles Memorial Sports Arena; 4,253	2–0
3	March 17	@ Detroit	L 113–124	Elgin Baylor (26)	—	Detroit Olympia; 3,422	2–1
4	March 18	@ Detroit	L 114–123	Elgin Baylor (47)	—	Detroit Olympia	2–2
5	March 19	Detroit	W 137–120	Elgin Baylor (35)	Baylor, Felix (15)	Shrine Auditorium; 3,705	3–2

Division finals: 3–4 (home: 1–2; road: 2–2)

Game	Date	Team	Score	High points	High rebounds	Location Attendance	Series
1	March 21	@ St. Louis	W 122–118	Elgin Baylor (44)	Elgin Baylor (14)	Kiel Auditorium; 8,147	1–0
2	March 22	@ St. Louis	L 106–121	Elgin Baylor (35)	Elgin Baylor (9)	Kiel Auditorium; 8,472	1–1
3	March 24	St. Louis	W 118–112	Elgin Baylor (25)	Elgin Baylor (18)	Los Angeles Memorial Sports Arena; 5,006	2–1
4	March 25	St. Louis	L 117–118	Jerry West (33)	Elgin Baylor (15)	Los Angeles Memorial Sports Arena; 4,923	2–2
5	March 27	@ St. Louis	W 121–112	Elgin Baylor (47)	Elgin Baylor (20)	Kiel Auditorium	3–2
6	March 29	St. Louis	L 113–114 (OT)	Elgin Baylor (39)	Elgin Baylor (21)	Los Angeles Memorial Sports Arena; 14,840	3–3
7	April 1	@ St. Louis	L 103–105	Elgin Baylor (39)	Baylor, West (12)	Kiel Auditorium–	3–4

1961 schedule

== Awards and records ==
- Elgin Baylor, All-NBA First Team
- Elgin Baylor, NBA All-Star Game
- Jerry West, NBA All-Star Game
- Rod Hundley, NBA All-Star Game
