= 1964 NBA Finals =

1964 basketball championship series

Team	Coach	Wins
Boston Celtics	Red Auerbach	4
San Francisco Warriors	Alex Hannum	1
- Dates: April 18—26
- Hall of Famers: Celtics: John Havlicek (1984); Tom Heinsohn (2015); K. C. Jones (1989); Sam Jones (1984); Clyde Lovellette (1988); Frank Ramsey (1982); Bill Russell (1975); Satch Sanders (2011, contributor); Warriors: Wilt Chamberlain (1979); Guy Rodgers (2014); Nate Thurmond (1985); Coaches: Red Auerbach (1969); Alex Hannum (1998); Officials: Mendy Rudolph (2007); Earl Strom (1995)
- Eastern finals: Celtics defeated Royals, 4–1
- Western finals: Warriors defeated Hawks, 4–3

The 1964 NBA World Championship Series was the championship round of the 1964 NBA playoffs, which concluded the National Basketball Association 1963–64 season. The best-of-seven series was played between the Western Division champion San Francisco Warriors and the Eastern Division champion Boston Celtics. This was the Celtics' eighth straight trip to the championship series, as they won the series over the Warriors, 4–1, securing their sixth consecutive NBA title.

This was the first time Bill Russell and Wilt Chamberlain faced off in the NBA Finals; they would do so once again in 1969. This was also the first meeting between the Celtics and Warriors in the NBA Finals; they would meet each other again in 2022, where the Warriors returned the favor and defeated the Celtics in six games.

== Team rosters ==
=== San Francisco Warriors ===
1963–64 San Francisco Warriors roster
Players

Pos.	No.	Player	Height	Weight	DOB	From
G	16	Al Attles	6 ft 0 in (1.83 m)	175 lb (79 kg)	1936–11–07	North Carolina A&T
C	13	Wilt Chamberlain	7 ft 1 in (2.16 m)	275 lb (125 kg)	1936–08–21	Kansas
F	55	Wayne Hightower	6 ft 8 in (2.03 m)	192 lb (87 kg)	1940–01–14	Kansas
G	12	Gary Hill	6 ft 4 in (1.93 m)	185 lb (84 kg)	1941–10–07	Oklahoma City
G/F	9	George Lee	6 ft 4 in (1.93 m)	200 lb (91 kg)	1936–11–23	Michigan
F	14	Tom Meschery	6 ft 6 in (1.98 m)	215 lb (98 kg)	1938–10–26	Saint Mary's
G	7	Gary Phillips	6 ft 3 in (1.91 m)	189 lb (86 kg)	1939–12–07	Houston
G	5	Guy Rodgers	6 ft 0 in (1.83 m)	185 lb (84 kg)	1935–09–01	Temple
F	17	Kenny Sears	6 ft 9 in (2.06 m)	198 lb (90 kg)	1933–08–17	Santa Clara
F/C	42	Nate Thurmond	6 ft 11 in (2.11 m)	225 lb (102 kg)	1941–07–25	Bowling Green
F	15	John Windsor	6 ft 8 in (2.03 m)	215 lb (98 kg)	1940–04–03	Stanford

Coaches
Head coach
- (United States) Alex Hannum (USC)

Legend
- (DP) Unsigned draft pick
- (FA) Free agent
- (S) Suspended
- Injured

Roster

== Series summary ==
Game	Date	Home team	Result	Road team
Game 1	April 18	Boston Celtics	108–96 (1–0)	San Francisco Warriors
Game 2	April 20	Boston Celtics	124–101 (2–0)	San Francisco Warriors
Game 3	April 22	San Francisco Warriors	115–91 (1–2)	Boston Celtics
Game 4	April 24	San Francisco Warriors	95–98 (1–3)	Boston Celtics
Game 5	April 26	Boston Celtics	105–99 (4–1)	San Francisco Warriors

Celtics win series 4–1

== Game summaries ==
=== Game 1 ===
April 18

Boxscore

San Francisco Warriors 96, Boston Celtics 108
Scoring by quarter: 24–25, 15–32, 25–22, 32–29
Pts: Wilt Chamberlain 22; Rebs: Wilt Chamberlain 23; Asts: Guy Rodgers 8	Pts: Sam Jones 28; Rebs: Bill Russell 25; Asts: K. C. Jones 7
Boston leads series, 1–0

Boston Garden, Boston, Massachusetts
Attendance: 13,909

=== Game 2 ===
April 20

Boxscore

San Francisco Warriors 101, Boston Celtics 124
Scoring by quarter: 22–31, 21–31, 25–36, 33–26
Pts: Wilt Chamberlain 32; Rebs: Wilt Chamberlain 25; Asts: Phillips, Rodgers 4 each	Pts: Sam Jones 31; Rebs: Bill Russell 24; Asts: Bill Russell 9
Boston leads series, 2–0

Boston Garden, Boston, Massachusetts
Attendance: 13,909

=== Game 3 ===
April 22

Boxscore

Boston Celtics 91, San Francisco Warriors 115
Scoring by quarter: 21–40, 22–27, 21–23, 27–25
Pts: John Havlicek 22; Rebs: Bill Russell 32; Asts: K. C. Jones 8	Pts: Wilt Chamberlain 35; Rebs: Wilt Chamberlain 25; Asts: Guy Rodgers 7
Boston leads series, 2–1

Cow Palace, Daly City, California
Attendance: 10,981

=== Game 4 ===
April 24

Boxscore

Boston Celtics 98, San Francisco Warriors 95
Scoring by quarter: 17–24, 23–20, 36–20, 22–31
Pts: Tom Heinsohn 25; Rebs: Bill Russell 19; Asts: K. C. Jones 5	Pts: Wilt Chamberlain 27; Rebs: Wilt Chamberlain 38; Asts: Guy Rodgers 6
Boston leads series, 3–1

Cow Palace, Daly City, California
Attendance: 14,862

=== Game 5 ===
April 26

Boxscore

San Francisco Warriors 99, Boston Celtics 105
Scoring by quarter: 24–22, 17–23, 30–29, 28–31
Pts: Wilt Chamberlain 30; Rebs: Wilt Chamberlain 27; Asts: Guy Rodgers 7	Pts: Tom Heinsohn 19; Rebs: Bill Russell 26; Asts: Bill Russell 6
Boston wins series, 4–1

Boston Garden, Boston, Massachusetts
Attendance: 13,909

== See also ==
- 1964 NBA playoffs
- 1963–64 NBA season
