= List of NBA annual scoring leaders =

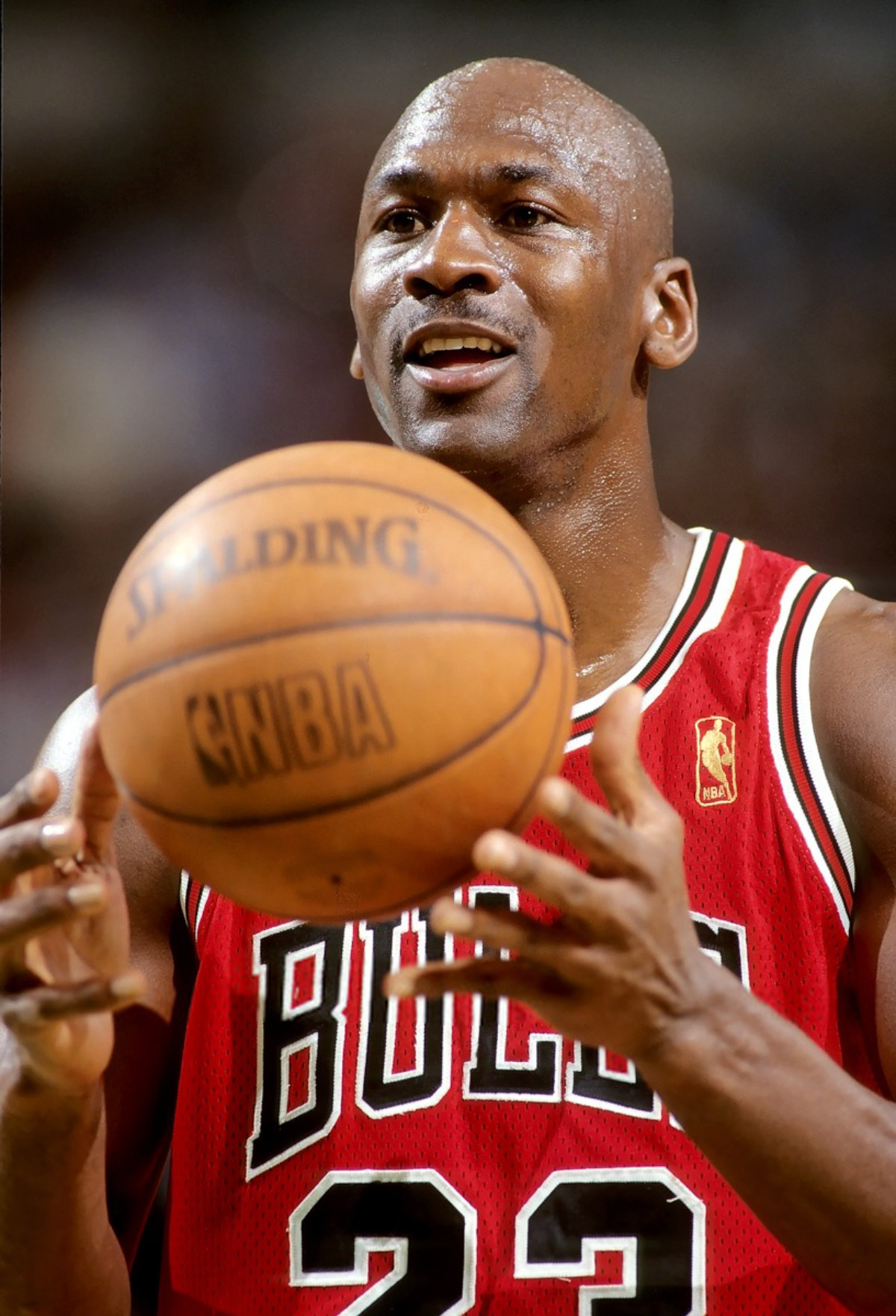
Michael Jordan recorded 10 scoring titles in his career—the most in NBA history.

In basketball, points are accumulated through field goals or free throws. The National Basketball Association's (NBA) scoring title is awarded to the player with the highest points per game average in a given season. The scoring title was originally determined by total points scored through the 1968–69 season, after which points per game was used to determine the leader instead. The three-point field goal was introduced in the NBA at the start of the 1979–80 season. To qualify for the scoring title, a player must appear in at least 70% of his team's games (58 games in a standard 82-game season). A player who appears in fewer games may still qualify if his point total would give him the highest scoring average when divided by the minimum number of games required. Since the 2013–14 season, the standard qualification threshold has been 58 games in an 82-game season, with special adjustments applied in shortened seasons; qualification requirements varied in earlier seasons.

Wilt Chamberlain holds the all-time records for total points scored (4,029) and points per game (50.36) in a season; both records were achieved in the 1961–62 season. He also holds the rookie record for points per game, averaging 37.60 points in the 1959–60 season. Among active players, James Harden has the highest point total (2,818) and the highest scoring average (36.13) in a season; both were achieved in the 2018–19 season.

Michael Jordan has won the most scoring titles, with 10. Jordan and Chamberlain are the only players to have won seven consecutive scoring titles (this was also Chamberlain's career total). George Gervin, Allen Iverson and Kevin Durant have each won four scoring titles in their careers, while George Mikan, Neil Johnston, Bob McAdoo and Harden have each won three. Eleven players have won the scoring title twice. Since the 1946–47 season, six players have won both the scoring title and the NBA championship in the same season: Joe Fulks in 1947 with the Philadelphia Warriors, Mikan from 1949 to 1950 with the Minneapolis Lakers, Kareem Abdul-Jabbar (then Lew Alcindor) (Note: Before the 1971–72 season, Lew Alcindor changed his name to Kareem Abdul-Jabbar.) in 1971 with the Milwaukee Bucks, Jordan from 1991 to 1993 and from 1996 to 1998 with the Chicago Bulls, Shaquille O'Neal in 2000 with the Los Angeles Lakers, and Shai Gilgeous-Alexander in 2025 with the Oklahoma City Thunder. Since the introduction of the three-point field goal, O'Neal is the only scoring leader to not have made a three-pointer during the season.

At 21 years and 197 days, Durant is the youngest scoring leader in NBA history, averaging 30.15 points in the 2009–10 season, while at 35 years and 61 days, Jordan is the oldest scoring leader, averaging 28.74 points in the 1997–98 season. Stephen Curry led the league with an average of 30.06 points in the 2015–16 season and became the first player to win the title shooting 50–40–90 in a season. Russell Westbrook led the league with an average of 31.58 points in the 2016–17 season, when he also became the second NBA player to average a triple-double in a season. In the 2021–22 season, Joel Embiid became the first international player to win the NBA scoring title, averaging 30.57 points per game. The most recent scoring leader is Luka Dončić.

== Annual leaders ==
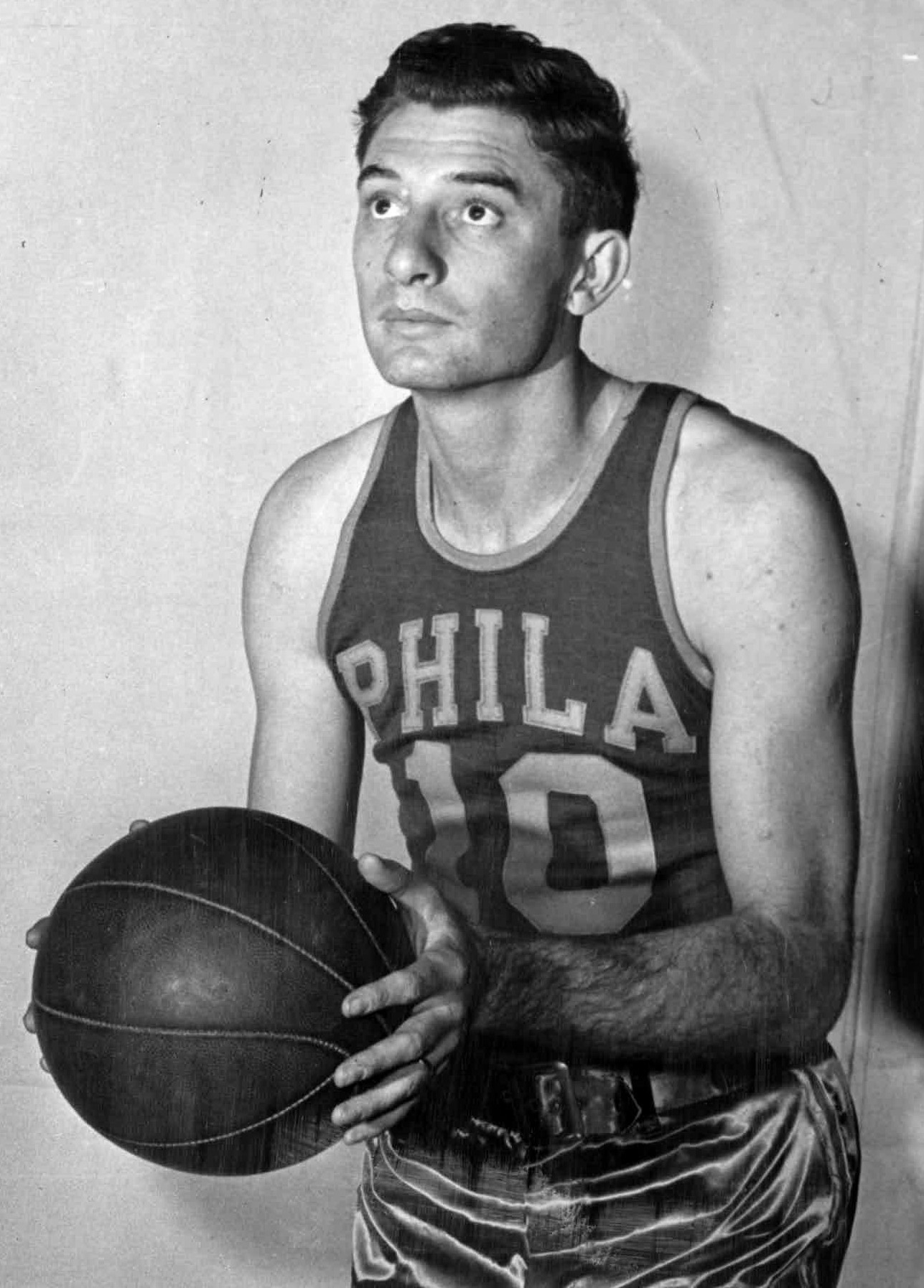
Joe Fulks won the first scoring title in 1947.

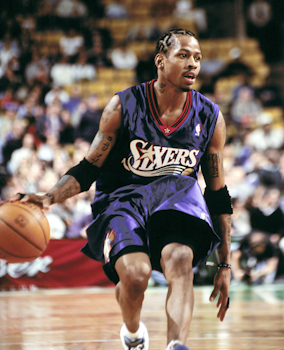
Allen Iverson won scoring titles in 1999, 2001, 2002 and 2005.

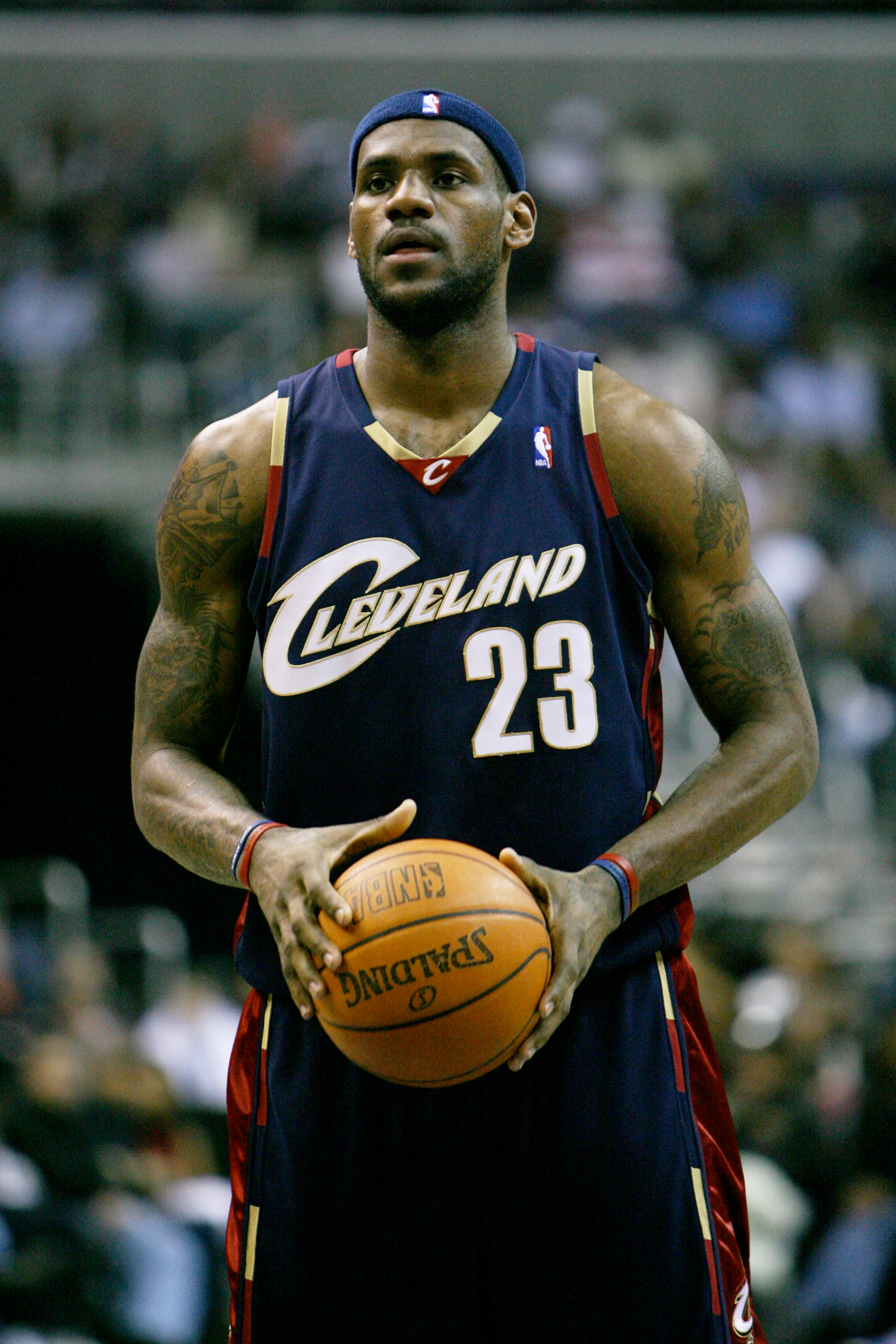
LeBron James won the scoring title in 2008 en route to becoming the NBA's all-time scoring leader in 2023.

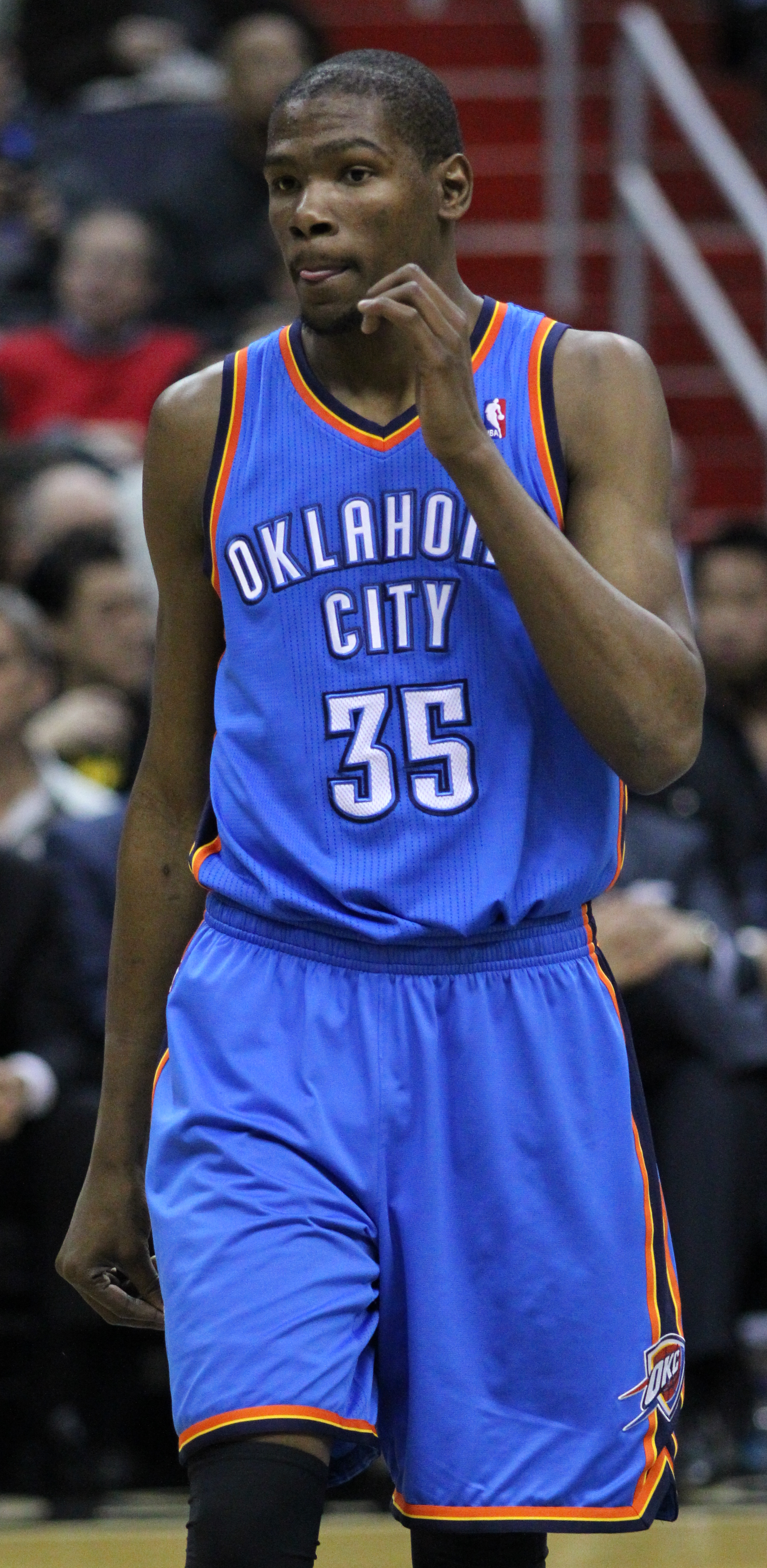
Kevin Durant became the youngest scoring champion in 2010. He won three more scoring titles in 2011, 2012 and 2014.

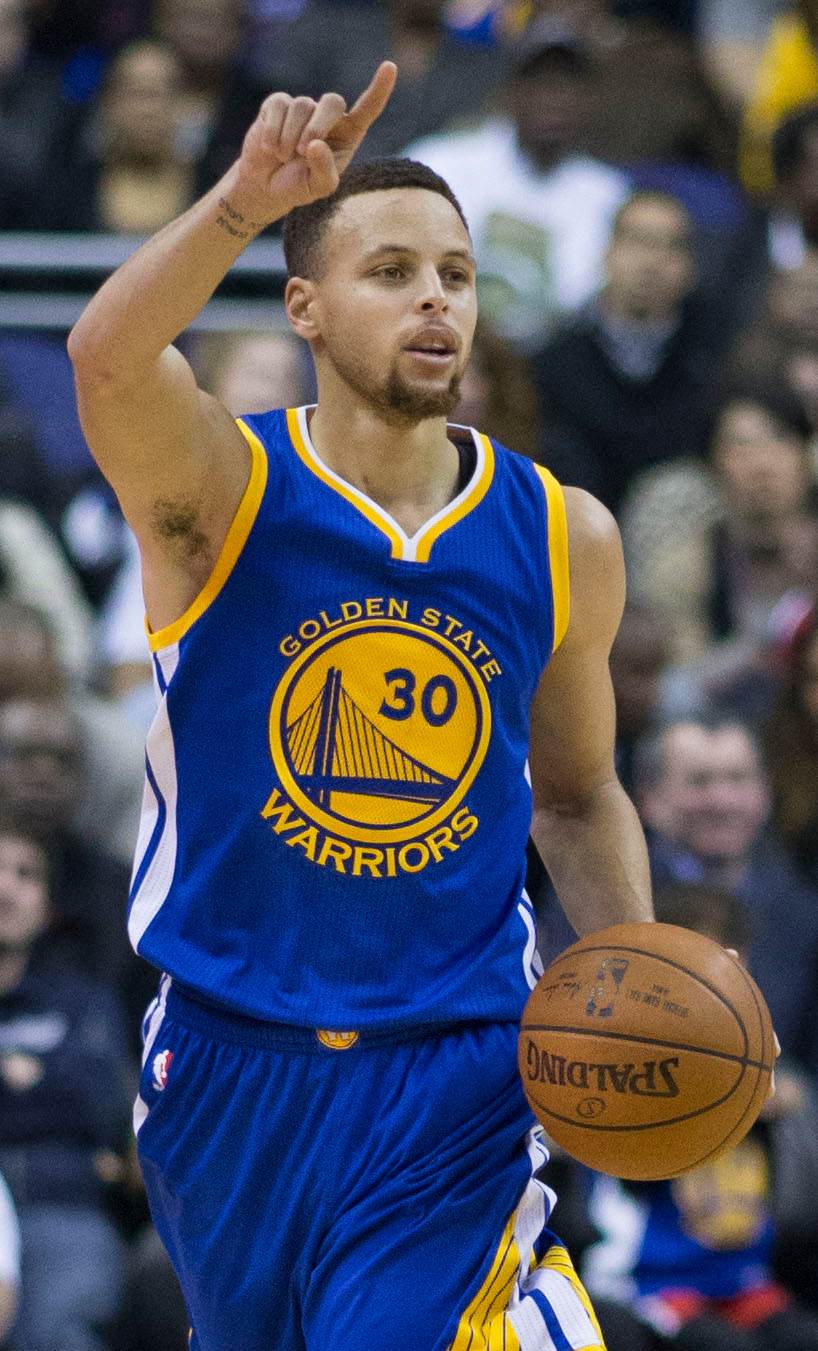
Stephen Curry became the first player to win the scoring title while shooting 50–40–90 in 2016. He won it again in 2021.

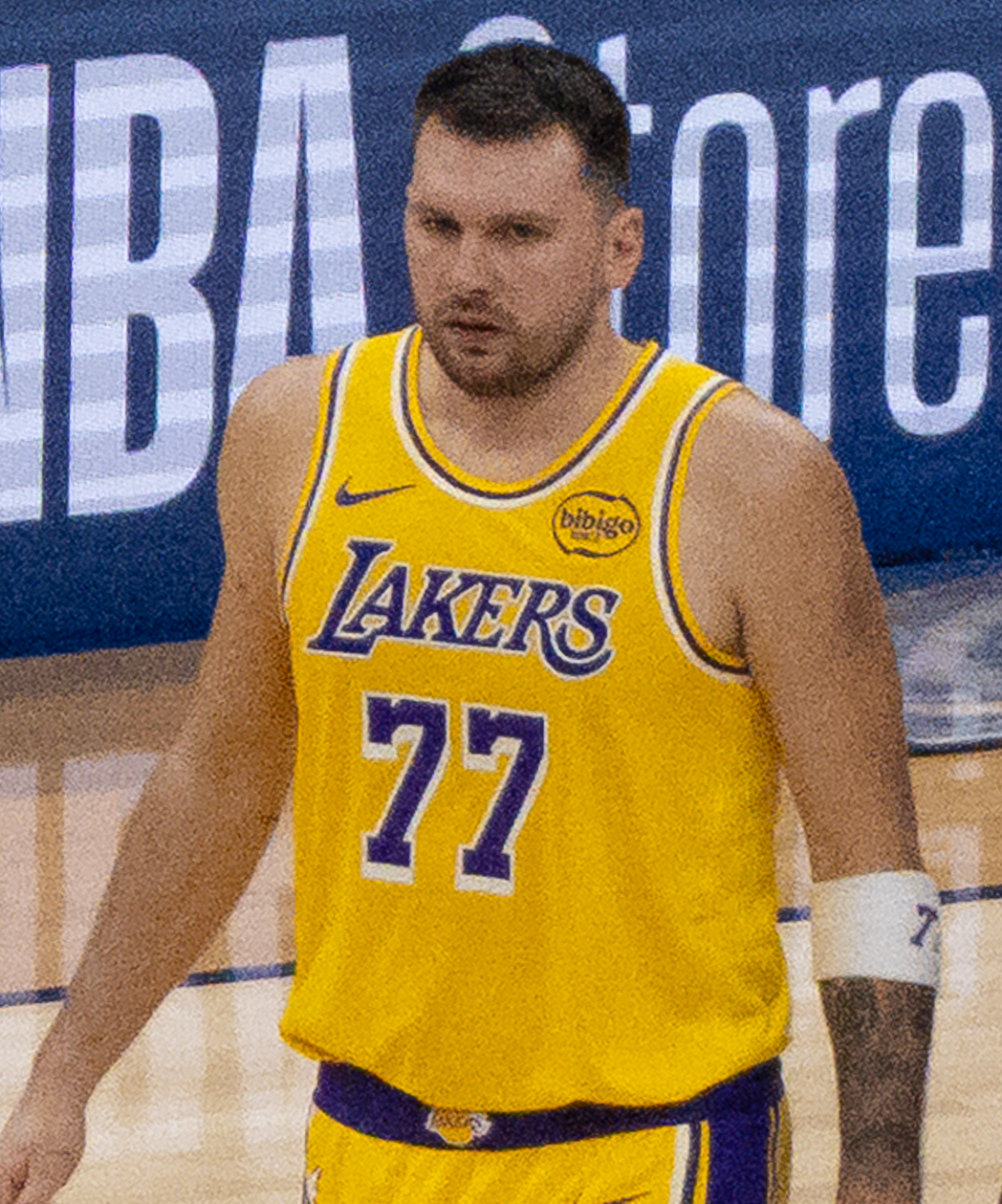
Luka Dončić is the NBA's reigning scoring leader after averaging 33.48 points per game during the 2025–26 season.

^		Denotes player who is still active in the NBA			
*		Inducted into the Naismith Basketball Hall of Fame			
†		Not yet eligible for Hall of Fame consideration (Note: A player is not eligible for induction into the Naismith Basketball Hall of Fame until he has been fully retired for two seasons.)			
‡		Denotes player who won the NBA Most Valuable Player award that year			
**Bold**		Denotes the statistic used to determine the scoring leader: total points through the 1968–69 season and points per game from the 1969–70 season onward			
Player (X)		Denotes the number of times the player had been the scoring leader up to and including that season			
G	Guard	F	Forward	C	Center

Season	Player	Age (Note: The player's age on January 31 of the given season.)	Pos (Note: The player's primary position is listed.)	Nationality	Team	GP	Field goals made	3-point field goals made	Free throws made	Total points	Points per game	Ref
1946–47	Joe Fulks*	25	F	United States	Philadelphia Warriors	60	475	— (Note: The 3-point line had not yet been introduced.)	439	**1,389**	23.15	
1947–48	Max Zaslofsky (Note: In the 1947–48 season, Joe Fulks averaged the most points (22.07) but had only played in 43 games and totaled 949 points, the second-highest total.)	22	G	United States	Chicago Stags	48	373	—	261	**1,007**	20.98	
1948–49	George Mikan*	24	C	United States	Minneapolis Lakers	60	583	—	532	**1,698**	28.30	
1949–50	George Mikan* (2)	25	C	United States	Minneapolis Lakers	68	649	—	567	**1,865**	27.43	
1950–51	George Mikan* (3)	26	C	United States	Minneapolis Lakers	68	678	—	576	**1,932**	28.41	
1951–52	Paul Arizin*	23	F	United States	Philadelphia Warriors	66	548	—	578	**1,674**	25.36	
1952–53	Neil Johnston*	23	C	United States	Philadelphia Warriors	70	504	—	556	**1,564**	22.34	
1953–54	Neil Johnston* (2)	24	C	United States	Philadelphia Warriors	72	591	—	577	**1,759**	24.43	
1954–55	Neil Johnston* (3)	25	C	United States	Philadelphia Warriors	72	521	—	589	**1,631**	22.65	
1955–56 ‡	Bob Pettit*	23	C	United States	St. Louis Hawks	72	646	—	557	**1,849**	25.68	
1956–57	Paul Arizin* (2)	28	F	United States	Philadelphia Warriors	71	613	—	591	**1,817**	25.59	
1957–58	George Yardley*	29	F	United States	Detroit Pistons	72	673	—	655	**2,001**	27.79	
1958–59 ‡	Bob Pettit* (2)	26	F	United States	St. Louis Hawks	72	719	—	667	**2,105**	29.24	
1959–60 ‡	Wilt Chamberlain* (Note: Wilt Chamberlain holds the all-time rookie record for points per game.)	23	C	United States	Philadelphia Warriors	72	1,065	—	577	**2,707**	37.60	
1960–61	Wilt Chamberlain* (2)	24	C	United States	Philadelphia Warriors	79	1,251	—	531	**3,033**	38.39	
1961–62	Wilt Chamberlain* (3) (Note: Wilt Chamberlain holds the all-time record for total points scored and points per game in a single season.)	25	C	United States	Philadelphia Warriors	80	1,597	—	835	**4,029**	50.36	
1962–63	Wilt Chamberlain* (4)	26	C	United States	San Francisco Warriors	80	1,463	—	660	**3,586**	44.83	
1963–64	Wilt Chamberlain* (5)	27	C	United States	San Francisco Warriors	80	1,204	—	540	**2,948**	36.85	
1964–65	Wilt Chamberlain* (6)	28	C	United States	San Francisco Warriors; Philadelphia 76ers	73	1,063	—	408	**2,534**	34.71	
1965–66 ‡	Wilt Chamberlain* (7)	29	C	United States	Philadelphia 76ers	79	1,074	—	501	**2,649**	33.53	
1966–67	Rick Barry*	22	F	United States	San Francisco Warriors	78	1,011	—	753	**2,775**	35.58	
1967–68	Dave Bing* (Note: In the 1967–68 season, Oscar Robertson averaged the most points (29.17) but had only played in 65 games and totaled 1,896 points, the sixth-highest total.)	24	G	United States	Detroit Pistons	79	835	—	472	**2,142**	27.11	
1968–69	Elvin Hayes* (Note: Elvin Hayes is the last rookie to lead the league in scoring average.)	23	C	United States	San Diego Rockets	82	930	—	467	**2,327**	28.38	
1969–70	Jerry West* (Note: In the 1969–70 season, rookie Lew Alcindor had the highest point total (2,361) but was second in scoring average (28.79).)	31	G	United States	Los Angeles Lakers	74	831	—	647	2,309	**31.20**	
1970–71 ‡	Lew Alcindor*	23	C	United States	Milwaukee Bucks	82	1,063	—	470	2,596	**31.66**	
1971–72 ‡	Kareem Abdul-Jabbar* (2)	24	C	United States	Milwaukee Bucks	81	1,159	—	504	2,822	**34.84**	
1972–73	Nate Archibald*	24	G	United States	Kansas City–Omaha Kings	80	1,028	—	663	2,719	**33.99**	
1973–74	Bob McAdoo*	22	C	United States	Buffalo Braves	74	901	—	459	2,261	**30.55**	
1974–75 ‡	Bob McAdoo* (2)	23	C	United States	Buffalo Braves	82	1,095	—	641	2,831	**34.52**	
1975–76	Bob McAdoo* (3)	24	C	United States	Buffalo Braves	78	934	—	559	2,427	**31.12**	
1976–77	Pete Maravich*	29	G	United States	New Orleans Jazz	73	886	—	501	2,273	**31.14**	
1977–78	George Gervin* (Note: In the 1977–78 season, George Gervin defeated David Thompson for the scoring title in the closest scoring duel ever (27.22 to 27.15). Thompson scored 73 on the last day of the season and Gervin answered with 63 (Gervin also broke Thompson's record of 32 points set earlier on the same day in the first quarter by scoring a record 33 points in the second quarter). Both Thompson's and Gervin's games were losses.)	25	G	United States	San Antonio Spurs	82	864	—	504	2,232	**27.22**	
1978–79	George Gervin* (2)	26	F	United States	San Antonio Spurs	80	947	—	471	2,365	**29.56**	
1979–80	George Gervin* (3)	27	G	United States	San Antonio Spurs	78	1,024	32	505	2,585	**33.14**	
1980–81	Adrian Dantley*	25	F	United States	Utah Jazz	80	909	2	632	2,452	**30.65**	
1981–82	George Gervin* (4)	29	G	United States	San Antonio Spurs	79	993	10	555	2,551	**32.29**	
1982–83	Alex English*	29	F	United States	Denver Nuggets	82	959	2	406	2,326	**28.37**	
1983–84	Adrian Dantley* (2)	28	F	United States	Utah Jazz	79	802	1	813	2,418	**30.61**	
1984–85	Bernard King* (Note: In the 1984–85 season, rookie Michael Jordan had the highest point total (2,313) but was third in scoring average (28.21). Bernard King tied for the twelfth-highest point total (1,809) but had the highest scoring average (32.89).)	28	F	United States	New York Knicks	55	691	1	426	1,809	**32.89**	
1985–86	Dominique Wilkins* (Note: In the 1985–86 season Alex English had the highest point total (2,414) but was third in scoring average (29.80).)	26	F	United States	Atlanta Hawks	78	888	13	577	2,366	**30.33**	
1986–87	Michael Jordan*	23	G	United States	Chicago Bulls	82	1,098	12	833	3,041	**37.09**	
1987–88 ‡	Michael Jordan* (2)	24	G	United States	Chicago Bulls	82	1,069	7	723	2,868	**34.98**	
1988–89	Michael Jordan* (3)	25	G	United States	Chicago Bulls	81	966	27	674	2,633	**32.51**	
1989–90	Michael Jordan* (4)	26	G	United States	Chicago Bulls	82	1,034	92	593	2,753	**33.57**	
1990–91 ‡	Michael Jordan* (5)	27	G	United States	Chicago Bulls	82	990	29	571	2,580	**31.46**	
1991–92 ‡	Michael Jordan* (6)	28	G	United States	Chicago Bulls	80	943	27	491	2,404	**30.05**	
1992–93	Michael Jordan* (7)	29	G	United States	Chicago Bulls	78	992	81	476	2,541	**32.58**	
1993–94	David Robinson* (Note: In the 1993–94 season, David Robinson scored 71 points in the final game of the season to edge Shaquille O'Neal (29.35) for the scoring title.)	28	C	United States	San Antonio Spurs	80	840	10	693	2,383	**29.79**	
1994–95	Shaquille O'Neal*	22	C	United States	Orlando Magic	79	930	0	455	2,315	**29.30**	
1995–96 ‡	Michael Jordan* (8)	32	G	United States	Chicago Bulls	82	916	111	548	2,491	**30.38**	
1996–97	Michael Jordan* (9)	33	G	United States	Chicago Bulls	82	920	111	480	2,431	**29.65**	
1997–98 ‡	Michael Jordan* (10) (Note: In the 1997–98 season, Michael Jordan defeated Shaquille O'Neal for the scoring title in the third-closest race ever (28.74 to 28.32). Jordan, at 35 years and 61 days, is the oldest scoring leader in NBA history.)	34	G	United States	Chicago Bulls	82	881	30	565	2,357	**28.74**	
1998–99 (Note: The 1998–99 season was shortened to 50 games due to the league's lockout. The qualification of this season's scoring title is to appear in at least 43 games (out of 50) or to have at least 854 points.)	Allen Iverson* (Note: In the lockout-shortened 1998–99 season, Shaquille O'Neal had the highest point total (1,289) but was second in scoring average (26.31).)	23	G	United States	Philadelphia 76ers	48	435	58	356	1,284	**26.75**	
1999–00 ‡	Shaquille O'Neal* (2)	27	C	United States	Los Angeles Lakers	79	956	0	432	2,344	**29.67**	
2000–01 ‡	Allen Iverson* (2) (Note: In the 2000–01 season, Jerry Stackhouse had the highest point total (2,380) but was second in scoring average (29.75).)	25	G	United States	Philadelphia 76ers	71	762	98	585	2,207	**31.08**	
2001–02	Allen Iverson* (3) (Note: In the 2001–02 season, Paul Pierce had the highest point total (2,144) but was third in scoring average (26.15).)	26	G	United States	Philadelphia 76ers	60	665	78	475	1,883	**31.38**	
2002–03	Tracy McGrady* (Note: In the 2002–03 season, Kobe Bryant had the highest point total (2,461) but was second in scoring average (30.01).)	23	G	United States	Orlando Magic	75	829	173	576	2,407	**32.09**	
2003–04	Tracy McGrady* (2) (Note: In the 2003–04 season, Kevin Garnett had the highest point total (1,987) but was third in scoring average (24.23).)	24	G	United States	Orlando Magic	67	653	174	398	1,878	**28.03**	
2004–05	Allen Iverson* (4)	29	G	United States	Philadelphia 76ers	75	771	104	656	2,302	**30.69**	
2005–06	Kobe Bryant*	27	G	United States	Los Angeles Lakers	80	978	180	696	2,832	**35.40**	
2006–07	Kobe Bryant* (2)	28	G	United States	Los Angeles Lakers	77	813	137	667	2,430	**31.56**	
2007–08	LeBron James^ (Note: In the 2007–08 season, Kobe Bryant had the highest point total (2,323) but was second in scoring average (28.33).)	23	F	United States	Cleveland Cavaliers	75	794	113	549	2,250	**30.00**	
2008–09	Dwyane Wade*	27	G	United States	Miami Heat	79	854	88	590	2,386	**30.20**	
2009–10	Kevin Durant^ (Note: In the 2009–10 season, Kevin Durant defeated LeBron James for the scoring title (30.15 to 29.71). Durant, at 21 years and 197 days old, is the youngest scoring leader in NBA history.)	21	F	United States	Oklahoma City Thunder	82	794	128	756	2,472	**30.15**	
2010–11	Kevin Durant^ (2)	22	F	United States	Oklahoma City Thunder	78	711	145	594	2,161	**27.71**	
2011–12 (Note: The 2011–12 season was shortened to 66 games due to the league's lockout. The qualification of this season's scoring title is to appear in at least 56 games (out of 66) or to have at least 1127 points.)	Kevin Durant^ (3) (Note: In the 2011–12 season, Kevin Durant defeated Kobe Bryant for the scoring title in the second-closest scoring race ever (28.03 to 27.86). Bryant, who needed to score 38 points in the final game to win, decided to sit out.)	23	F	United States	Oklahoma City Thunder	66	643	133	431	1,850	**28.03**	
2012–13	Carmelo Anthony* (Note: In the 2012–13 season, Kevin Durant had the highest point total (2,280) but was second in scoring average (28.15).)	28	F	United States	New York Knicks	67	669	157	425	1,920	**28.66**	
2013–14 ‡	Kevin Durant^ (4)	25	F	United States	Oklahoma City Thunder	81	849	192	703	2,593	**32.01**	
2014–15	Russell Westbrook^{†} (Note: In the 2014–15 season, James Harden had the highest point total (2,217) but was second in scoring average (27.37).)	26	G	United States	Oklahoma City Thunder	67	627	86	546	1,886	**28.15**	
2015–16 ‡	Stephen Curry^ (Note: In the 2015–16 season, James Harden had the highest point total (2,376) but was second in scoring average (28.98).)	27	G	United States	Golden State Warriors	79	805	402	363	2,375	**30.06**	
2016–17 ‡	Russell Westbrook^{†} (2)	28	G	United States	Oklahoma City Thunder	81	824	200	710	2,558	**31.58**	
2017–18 ‡	James Harden^ (Note: In the 2017–18 season, LeBron James had the highest point total (2,251) but was third in scoring average (27.45).)	28	G	United States	Houston Rockets	72	651	265	624	2,191	**30.43**	
2018–19	James Harden^ (2)	29	G	United States	Houston Rockets	78	843	378	754	2,818	**36.13**	
2019–20	James Harden^ (3)	30	G	United States	Houston Rockets	68	672	299	692	2,335	**34.34**	
2020–21	Stephen Curry^ (2)	32	G	United States	Golden State Warriors	63	658	337	362	2,015	**31.98**	
2021–22	Joel Embiid^ (Note: In the 2021–22 season, Trae Young had the highest point total (2,155) but was fourth in scoring average (28.36).)	27	C	Cameroon (Note: Joel Embiid was born in Cameroon, but became a naturalized United States citizen in 2022. He also holds French citizenship.)	Philadelphia 76ers	68	666	93	654	2,079	**30.57**	
2022–23 ‡	Joel Embiid^ (2) (Note: In the 2022–23 season, Jayson Tatum had the highest point total (2,225) but was sixth in scoring average (30.07).)	28	C	Cameroon	Philadelphia 76ers	66	728	66	661	2,183	**33.08**	
2023–24	Luka Dončić^ (Note: In the 2023–24 season, Joel Embiid averaged 34.69 points per game. However, he only played 39 games that season, failing to meet the 58-game threshold.)	24	G	Slovenia	Dallas Mavericks	70	804	284	478	2,370	**33.86**	
2024–25 ‡	Shai Gilgeous-Alexander^	26	G	Canada	Oklahoma City Thunder	76	860	163	601	2,484	**32.68**	
2025–26	Luka Dončić^ (2)	26	G	Slovenia	Los Angeles Lakers	64	693	254	503	2,143	**33.48**	

== Multiple-time leaders ==
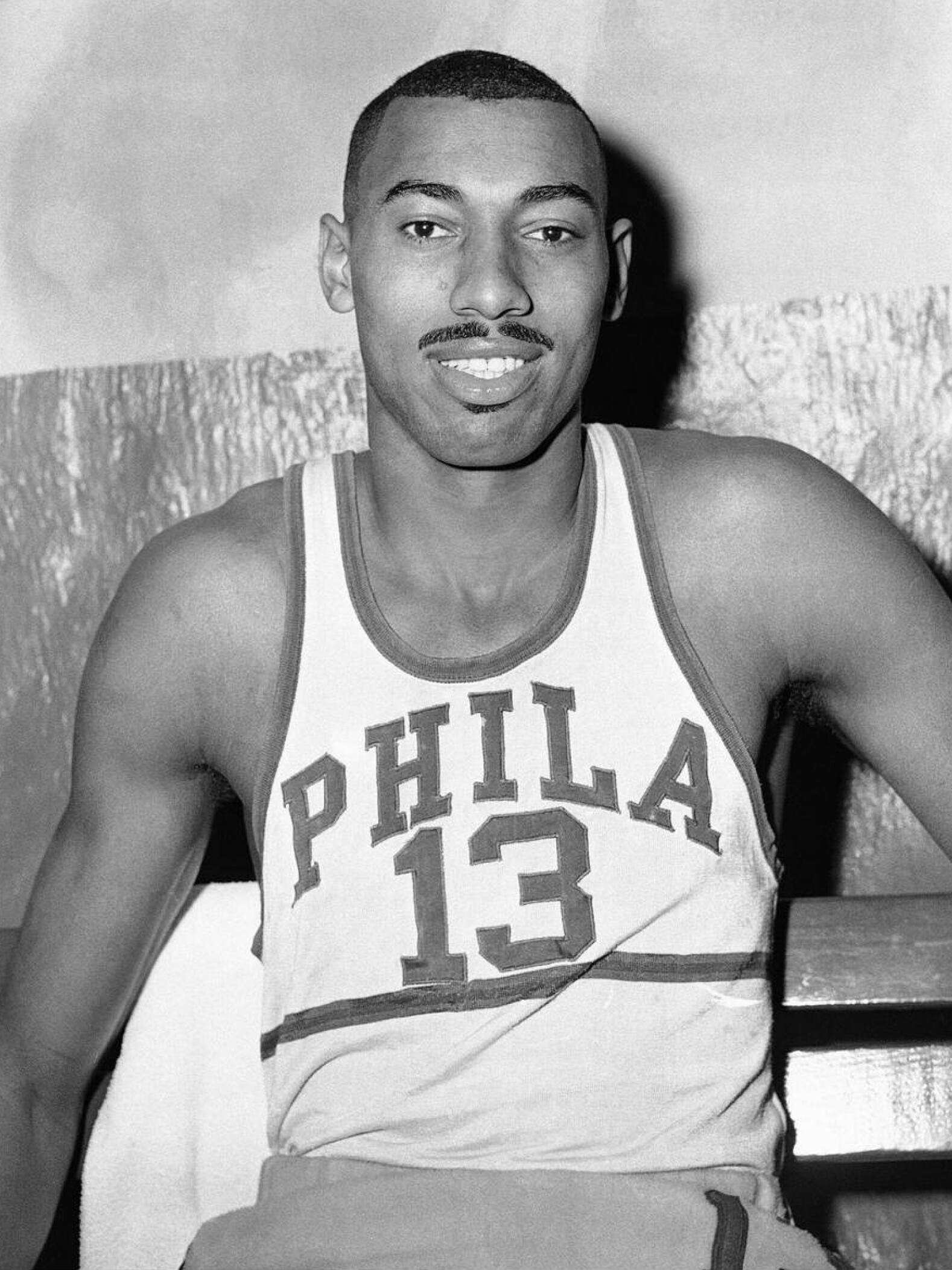
Wilt Chamberlain won seven consecutive scoring titles from 1960 to 1966.

Rank	Player	Team	Scoring titles	Years
1	Michael Jordan	Chicago Bulls	10	1987, 1988, 1989, 1990, 1991, 1992, 1993, 1996, 1997, 1998
2	Wilt Chamberlain	Philadelphia Warriors / San Francisco Warriors (5) / Philadelphia 76ers (2) (Note: Although Wilt Chamberlain played for both the San Francisco Warriors and the Philadelphia 76ers during the 1964–65 NBA season, that season's scoring title is attributed here to the 76ers, the team with which he finished the season.)	7	1960, 1961, 1962, 1963, 1964, 1965, 1966
3	George Gervin	San Antonio Spurs	4	1978, 1979, 1980, 1982
3	Allen Iverson	Philadelphia 76ers	4	1999, 2001, 2002, 2005
3	Kevin Durant	Oklahoma City Thunder	4	2010, 2011, 2012, 2014
6	George Mikan	Minneapolis Lakers	3	1949, 1950, 1951
6	Neil Johnston	Philadelphia Warriors	3	1953, 1954, 1955
6	Bob McAdoo	Buffalo Braves	3	1974, 1975, 1976
6	James Harden	Houston Rockets	3	2018, 2019, 2020
10	Paul Arizin	Philadelphia Warriors	2	1952, 1957
10	Bob Pettit	St. Louis Hawks	2	1956, 1959
10	Kareem Abdul-Jabbar	Milwaukee Bucks	2	1971, 1972
10	Adrian Dantley	Utah Jazz	2	1981, 1984
10	Shaquille O'Neal	Orlando Magic (1) / Los Angeles Lakers (1)	2	1995, 2000
10	Tracy McGrady	Orlando Magic	2	2003, 2004
10	Kobe Bryant	Los Angeles Lakers	2	2006, 2007
10	Russell Westbrook	Oklahoma City Thunder	2	2015, 2017
10	Stephen Curry	Golden State Warriors	2	2016, 2021
10	Joel Embiid	Philadelphia 76ers	2	2022, 2023
10	Luka Dončić	Dallas Mavericks (1) / Los Angeles Lakers (1)	2	2024, 2026

== By team ==
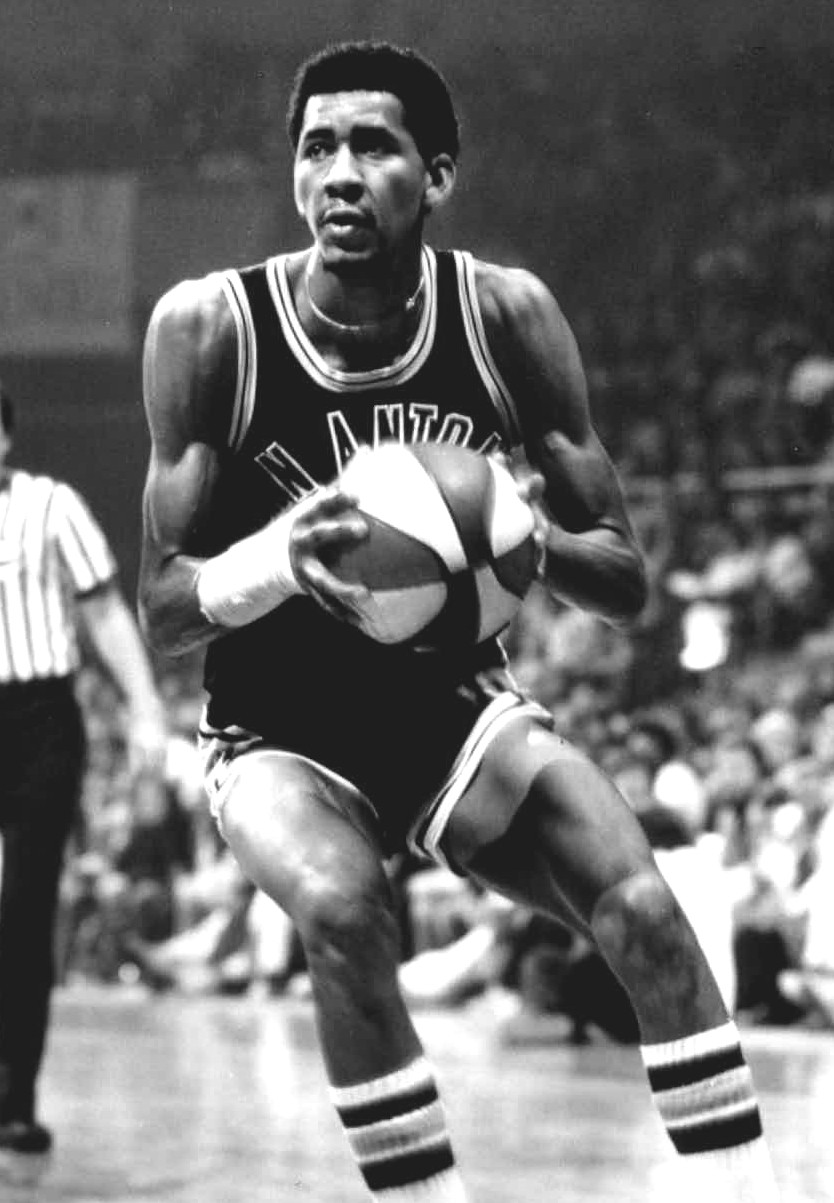
George Gervin won four of the San Antonio Spurs' five scoring titles, including three consecutive titles from 1978 to 1980.

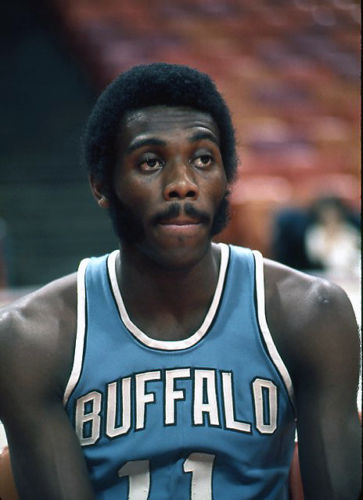
Bob McAdoo won all three scoring titles in Buffalo Braves / Los Angeles Clippers franchise history, from 1974 to 1976.

†	Denotes a defunct NBA team

Titles	Team	Years
14	Philadelphia Warriors / San Francisco Warriors / Golden State Warriors	1947, 1952, 1953, 1954, 1955, 1957, 1960, 1961, 1962, 1963, 1964, 1967, 2016, 2021
10	Chicago Bulls	1987, 1988, 1989, 1990, 1991, 1992, 1993, 1996, 1997, 1998
8	Philadelphia 76ers	1965, 1966, 1999, 2001, 2002, 2005, 2022, 2023
8	Minneapolis Lakers / Los Angeles Lakers	1949, 1950, 1951, 1970, 2000, 2006, 2007, 2026
7	Oklahoma City Thunder	2010, 2011, 2012, 2014, 2015, 2017, 2025
5	San Antonio Spurs	1978, 1979, 1980, 1982, 1994
4	San Diego Rockets / Houston Rockets	1969, 2018, 2019, 2020
3	Buffalo Braves / Los Angeles Clippers	1974, 1975, 1976
3	New Orleans Jazz / Utah Jazz	1977, 1981, 1984
3	St. Louis Hawks / Atlanta Hawks	1956, 1959, 1986
3	Orlando Magic	1995, 2003, 2004
2	Detroit Pistons	1958, 1968
2	Milwaukee Bucks	1971, 1972
2	New York Knicks	1985, 2013
1	Chicago Stags†	1948
1	Kansas City–Omaha Kings / Sacramento Kings	1973
1	Denver Nuggets	1983
1	Cleveland Cavaliers	2008
1	Miami Heat	2009
1	Dallas Mavericks	2024
0	Boston Celtics	None
0	Brooklyn Nets	None
0	Charlotte Hornets	None
0	Indiana Pacers	None
0	Memphis Grizzlies	None
0	Minnesota Timberwolves	None
0	New Orleans Pelicans	None
0	Phoenix Suns	None
0	Portland Trail Blazers	None
0	Toronto Raptors	None
0	Washington Wizards	None

== By country ==
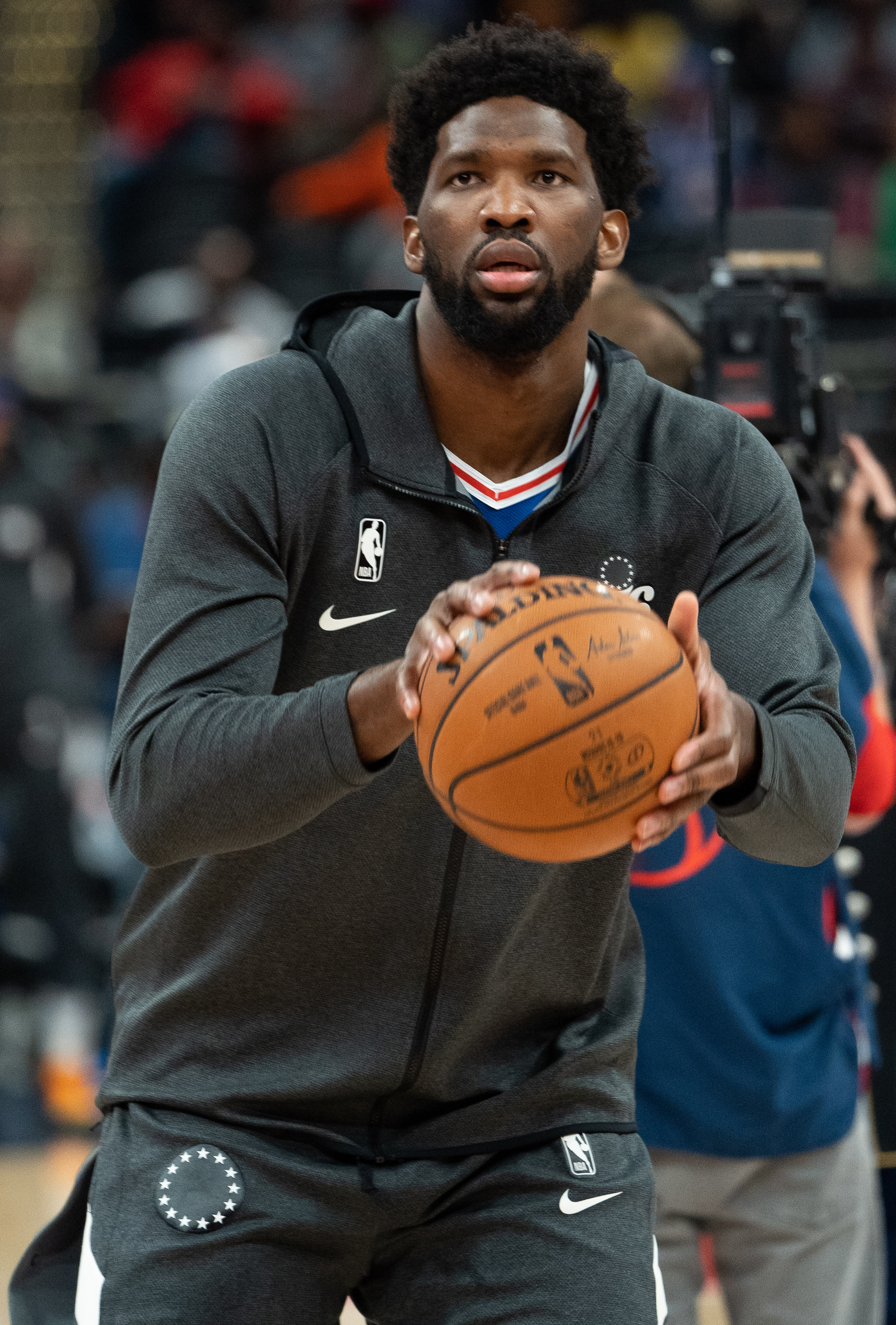
Joel Embiid became the first international player to win the NBA scoring title in the 2021–22 season.

Titles	Country	Years
75	United States	1947–2021
2	Cameroon	2022, 2023
2	Slovenia	2024, 2026
1	Canada	2025

== See also ==
- List of NBA career scoring leaders
- List of NBA career 3-point scoring leaders
- List of National Basketball League (United States) season scoring leaders
- List of NBA annual 3-point scoring leaders
- List of NBA annual assists leaders
- List of NBA annual rebounding leaders
- List of NBA annual steals leaders
- List of NBA annual blocks leaders
- List of NBA annual field goal percentage leaders
