= Western Division (NBA) =

1946–1970 division of NBA and BAA

- League: National Basketball Association
- Sport: Basketball
- First season: 1946–47 BAA season
- Folded: 1969–70 NBA season
- Replaced by: Western Conference
- Last champion: Atlanta Hawks (7th title) (1970)
- Most titles: Minneapolis/Los Angeles Lakers (8 titles)

The Western Division was a division in the National Basketball Association (NBA) and its forerunner, the Basketball Association of America (BAA). The division was created at the start of the 1946–47 BAA season, when the league was created, and was then kept as one of the divisions when BAA merged with the National Basketball League (NBL) to create the NBA on August 3, 1949. Originally, when the merger between the BAA and NBL happened, it was planned for the Western and Eastern divisions to be renamed into the American and National divisions (similar to what Major League Baseball had done following the National League and American League allowing for each league to compete with each other for the World Series in order for their leagues to maintain their independent integrity) with the divisions being re-divided between the Western and Eastern teams in both leagues not long afterward (though it was likely going to have the American Division teams being teams originally playing in the 1948–49 BAA season at the time and the National Division teams being teams planned to have been from the NBL at the time, including the Indianapolis Olympians expansion team), but the sudden dropout of the Oshkosh All-Stars from the initial BAA–NBL merger into the NBA by September 3, 1949, led to the Western and Eastern divisions returning as planned alongside the temporary creation of a Central Division for that season. The division existed until the 1970–71 NBA season when the NBA expanded from 14 to 17 teams and realigned into the Eastern and Western conferences with two divisions each.

== Teams ==
Team	City	Year	From	Year	To	Current division
Team	City	Joined		Left		Current division
Anderson Packers	Anderson, Indiana	1949	—*	1950	NPBL	—
Tri-Cities Blackhawks (1949–1951); Milwaukee Hawks (1951–1955); St. Louis Hawks (1955–1968); Atlanta Hawks (1968–present)	Moline, Illinois; Milwaukee, Wisconsin; St. Louis, Missouri; Atlanta, Georgia	1949	—*	1970	Central Division	Southeast Division
Baltimore Bullets (original)	Baltimore, Maryland	1947	ABL	1948	Eastern Division	—
Chicago Packers (1961–1962); Chicago Zephyrs (1962–1963); Baltimore Bullets (1963–1966) (now the Washington Wizards)	Chicago, Illinois; Chicago, Illinois; Baltimore, Maryland	1961	—†	1966	Eastern Division	Southeast Division
Chicago Bulls	Chicago, Illinois	1966	—†	1970	Midwest Division	Central Division
Chicago Stags	Chicago, Illinois	1946	§	1949	Central Division	—
Rochester Royals (1948–1949, 1950–1957); Cincinnati Royals (1957–1962) (now the Sacramento Kings)	Rochester, New York; Cincinnati, Ohio	1948; 1950	NBL; Central Division	1949; 1962	Central Division; Eastern Division	Pacific Division
Cleveland Rebels	Cleveland, Ohio	1946	§	1947	Folded	—
Denver Nuggets	Denver, Colorado	1949	—*	1950	Folded	—
Detroit Falcons	Detroit, Michigan	1946	§	1947	Folded	—
Fort Wayne Pistons (1948–1949, 1950–1957); Detroit Pistons (1957–present)	Fort Wayne, Indiana; Detroit, Michigan	1948; 1950	NBL; Central Division	1949; 1967	Central Division; Eastern Division	Central Division
Indianapolis Jets	Indianapolis, Indiana	1948	NBL	1949	Folded	—
Indianapolis Olympians	Indianapolis, Indiana	1949	—†	1953	Folded	—
Minneapolis Lakers (1948–1949, 1950–1960); Los Angeles Lakers (1960–present)	Minneapolis, Minnesota; Los Angeles, California	1948; 1950	NBL; Central Division	1949; 1970	Central Division; Pacific Division	Pacific Division
Phoenix Suns	Phoenix, Arizona	1968	—†	1970	Midwest Division	Pacific Division
Pittsburgh Ironmen	Pittsburgh, Pennsylvania	1946	§	1947	Folded	—
San Diego Rockets (now the Houston Rockets)	San Diego, California	1967	—†	1970	Pacific Division	Southwest Division
San Francisco Warriors (now the Golden State Warriors)	San Francisco, California	1962	Eastern Division	1970	Pacific Division	Pacific Division
Seattle SuperSonics (now the Oklahoma City Thunder)	Seattle, Washington	1967	—†	1970	Pacific Division	Northwest Division
Sheboygan Red Skins	Sheboygan, Wisconsin	1949	—*	1950	NPBL	—
St. Louis Bombers	St. Louis, Missouri	1946	§	1949	Central Division	—
Washington Capitols	Washington, D.C.	1947	Eastern Division	1948	Eastern Division	—
Waterloo Hawks	Waterloo, Iowa	1949	—*	1950	NPBL	—

Notes

- § founding BAA team
- † denotes an expansion team.
- * denotes a team that merged from the National Basketball League (NBL)

== Division champions ==
^	Had or tied for the best regular season record for that season

Season	Team	Record	Playoffs result
1946–47	Chicago Stags	39–22 (.639)	Lost BAA Finals
1947–48	St. Louis Bombers^	29–19 (.604)	Lost Semifinals
1948–49	Rochester Royals^	45–15 (.750)	Lost Division finals
1949–50	Indianapolis Olympians	39–25 (.609)	Lost Division finals
1950–51	Minneapolis Lakers^	44–24 (.647)	Lost Division semifinals
1951–52	Rochester Royals^	41–25 (.621)	Lost Division finals
1952–53	Minneapolis Lakers^	48–22 (.686)	Won NBA Finals
1953–54	Minneapolis Lakers^	46–26 (.639)	Won NBA Finals
1954–55	Fort Wayne Pistons^	43–29 (.597)	Lost NBA Finals
1955–56	Fort Wayne Pistons	37–35 (.521)	Lost NBA Finals
1956–57	St. Louis Hawks	34–38 (.472)	Lost NBA Finals
1957–58	St. Louis Hawks	41–31 (.569)	Won NBA Finals
1958–59	St. Louis Hawks	49–23 (.681)	Lost Division finals
1959–60	St. Louis Hawks	46–29 (.613)	Lost NBA Finals
1960–61	St. Louis Hawks	51–28 (.646)	Lost NBA Finals
1961–62	Los Angeles Lakers	54–26 (.675)	Lost NBA Finals
1962–63	Los Angeles Lakers	53–27 (.663)	Lost NBA Finals
1963–64	San Francisco Warriors	48–32 (.600)	Lost NBA Finals
1964–65	Los Angeles Lakers	49–31 (.613)	Lost NBA Finals
1965–66	Los Angeles Lakers	45–35 (.563)	Lost NBA Finals
1966–67	San Francisco Warriors	44–37 (.543)	Lost NBA Finals
1967–68	St. Louis Hawks	56–26 (.683)	Lost Division semifinals
1968–69	Los Angeles Lakers	55–27 (.671)	Lost NBA Finals
1969–70	Atlanta Hawks	48–34 (.585)	Lost Division finals

=== Titles by team ===
Team	Titles	Season(s) won
Minneapolis Lakers/Los Angeles Lakers	8	1950–51, 1952–53, 1953–54, 1961–62, 1962–63, 1964–65, 1965–66, 1968–69
St. Louis Hawks/Atlanta Hawks	7	1956–57, 1957–58, 1958–59, 1959–60, 1960–61, 1967–68, 1969–70
Rochester Royals (now the Sacramento Kings)	2	1948–49, 1951–52
Fort Wayne Pistons (now the Detroit Pistons)	2	1954–55, 1955–56
San Francisco Warriors (now the Golden State Warriors)	2	1963–64, 1966–67
Chicago Stags	1	1946–47
St. Louis Bombers	1	1947–48
Indianapolis Olympians	1	1949–50

== Season results ==
^	Denotes team that won the BAA/NBA championships
^{+}	Denotes team that lost the BAA/NBA Finals
*	Denotes team that qualified for the BAA/NBA playoffs

Season	Team (record)						
Season	1st	2nd	3rd	4th	5th	6th	7th
1946: the Western Division was formed with five inaugural members.
1946–47	Chicago^{+} (39–22)	St. Louis* (38–23)	Cleveland* (30–30)	Detroit (20–40)	Pittsburgh (15–45)		
1947: the Cleveland Rebels, Detroit Falcons and Pittsburgh Ironmen folded during the off-season, while the Washington Capitols joined from the Eastern Division and the Baltimore Bullets joined from the American Basketball League (ABL).
1947–48	St. Louis* (29–19)	Baltimore^ (28–20)	Chicago* (28–20)	Washington* (28–20)			
1948: the Washington Capitols left to re-join the Eastern Division, the Baltimore Bullets left to join the Eastern Division, while the Fort Wayne Pistons, Indianapolis Jets, Minneapolis Lakers and Rochester Royals joined from the National Basketball League (NBL).
1948–49	Rochester* (45–15)	Minneapolis^ (44–16)	Chicago* (38–22)	St. Louis* (29–31)	Fort Wayne (22–38)	Indianapolis (18–42)	
1949: the Indianapolis Jets folded during the off-season, the Chicago Stags, Fort Wayne Pistons, Minneapolis Lakers, Rochester Royals and St. Louis Bombers left to join the Central Division. An expansion team, the Indianapolis Olympians, joined the division, while the Anderson Packers, Denver Nuggets, Sheboygan Red Skins, Tri-Cities Blackhawks and Waterloo Hawks merged from the National Basketball League (NBL).
1949–50	Indianapolis* (39–25)	Anderson* (37–27)	Tri-Cities* (29–35)	Sheboygan* (22–40)	Waterloo (19–43)	Denver (11–51)	
1950: the Denver Nuggets folded during the off-season, while the Anderson Packers, Sheboygan Red Skins and Waterloo Hawks left to join the National Professional Basketball League (NPBL). The Fort Wayne Pistons, Minneapolis Lakers and Rochester Royals re-joined the division.
1950–51	Minneapolis* (44–24)	Rochester^ (41–27)	Fort Wayne* (32–36)	Indianapolis* (31–37)	Tri-Cities (25–43)		
1951: the Tri-Cities Blackhawks relocated and became the Milwaukee Hawks.
1951–52	Rochester* (41–25)	Minneapolis^ (40–26)	Indianapolis* (34–32)	Fort Wayne* (29–37)	Milwaukee (17–49)		
1952–53	Minneapolis^ (48–22)	Rochester* (44–26)	Fort Wayne* (36–33)	Indianapolis* (28–43)	Milwaukee (27–44)		
1953: the Indianapolis Olympians folded during the off-season.
1953–54	Minneapolis^ (46–26)	Rochester* (44–28)	Fort Wayne* (40–32)	Milwaukee (21–51)			
1954–55	Fort Wayne^{+} (43–29)	Minneapolis* (40–32)	Rochester* (29–43)	Milwaukee (26–46)			
1955: the Milwaukee Hawks relocated and became the St. Louis Hawks.
1955–56	Fort Wayne^{+} (37–35)	Minneapolis* (33–39)	St. Louis* (33–39)	Rochester (31–41)			
1956–57	St. Louis^{+} (34–38)	Minneapolis* (34–38)	Fort Wayne* (34–38)	Rochester (31–41)			
1957: the Fort Wayne Pistons relocated and became the Detroit Pistons, the Rochester Royals relocated and became the Cincinnati Royals.
1957–58	St. Louis^ (41–31)	Detroit* (33–39)	Cincinnati* (33–39)	Minneapolis (19–53)			
1958–59	St. Louis* (49–23)	Minneapolis^{+} (33–39)	Detroit* (28–44)	Cincinnati (19–53)			
1959–60	St. Louis^{+} (46–29)	Detroit* (30–45)	Minneapolis* (25–50)	Cincinnati (19–56)			
1960: the Minneapolis Lakers relocated and became the Los Angeles Lakers.
1960–61	St. Louis^{+} (51–28)	Los Angeles* (36–43)	Detroit* (34–45)	Cincinnati (33–46)			
1961: an expansion team, the Chicago Packers, joined the division.
1961–62	Los Angeles^{+} (54–26)	Cincinnati* (43–37)	Detroit* (37–43)	St. Louis (29–51)	Chicago (18–62)		
1962: the Chicago Packers were renamed the Chicago Zephyrs, while the Cincinnati Royals were shifted to the Eastern Division, because the Philadelphia Warriors relocated and joined the division as the San Francisco Warriors.
1962–63	Los Angeles^{+} (53–27)	St. Louis* (48–32)	Detroit* (34–46)	San Francisco (31–49)	Chicago (25–55)		
1963: the Chicago Zephyrs relocated and became the Baltimore Bullets.
1963–64	San Francisco^{+} (48–32)	St. Louis* (46–34)	Los Angeles* (42–38)	Baltimore (31–49)	Detroit (23–57)		
1964–65	Los Angeles^{+} (49–31)	St. Louis* (45–35)	Baltimore* (37–43)	Detroit (31–49)	San Francisco (17–63)		
1965–66	Los Angeles^{+} (45–35)	Baltimore* (38–42)	St. Louis* (36–44)	San Francisco (35–45)	Detroit (22–58)		
1966: an expansion team, the Chicago Bulls, joined the division, while the Baltimore Bullets left to join the Eastern Division.
1966–67	San Francisco^{+} (44–37)	St. Louis* (39–42)	Los Angeles* (36–45)	Chicago* (33–48)	Detroit (30–51)		
1967: expansion teams, the San Diego Rockets and Seattle SuperSonics, joined the division, while the Detroit Pistons left to join the Eastern Division.
1967–68	St. Louis* (56–26)	Los Angeles^{+} (52–30)	San Francisco* (43–39)	Chicago* (29–53)	Seattle (23–59)	San Diego (15–67)	
1968: an expansion team, the Phoenix Suns, joined the division, while the St. Louis Hawks relocated and became the Atlanta Hawks.
1968–69	Los Angeles^{+} (55–27)	Atlanta* (48–34)	San Francisco* (41–41)	San Diego* (37–45)	Chicago (33–49)	Seattle (30–52)	Phoenix (16–66)
1969–70	Atlanta* (48–34)	Los Angeles^{+} (46–36)	Chicago* (39–43)	Phoenix* (39–43)	Seattle (36–46)	San Francisco (30–52)	San Diego (27–55)
1970: the NBA divided the league into the Eastern and Western conferences. The Atlanta Hawks joined the Central Division, the Chicago Bulls and Phoenix Suns joined the Midwest Division, while the Los Angeles Lakers, San Diego Rockets, San Francisco Warriors and Seattle SuperSonics joined the Pacific Division.
