= 1963–64 San Francisco Warriors season =

NBA professional basketball team season

- Division champions
- Head coach: Alex Hannum
- Arena: Cow Palace

Results
- Record: 48–32 (.600)
- Place: Division: 1st (Western)
- Playoff finish: NBA Finals (lost to Celtics 1–4)
- Stats at Basketball Reference

Local media
- Television: KRON-TV
- Radio: KSFO

The 1963–64 San Francisco Warriors season was the Warriors' 18th season in the NBA and second in San Francisco.

The Warriors were led by superstar center Wilt Chamberlain and renowned playmaker Guy Rodgers, both of whom were named to their second-consecutive all-star games during the season. The Warriors were also aided by rookie draft pick Nate Thurmond as well as veterans Tom Meschery and Al Attles, and were coached by newcomer Alex Hannum. The Warriors won 48 games in the regular season, and beat the St. Louis Hawks in a tough seven-game series during the conference finals to advance to the NBA Finals, in only their second season as a San Francisco team. They were ousted in five games by the Boston Celtics in the NBA Championship.

== Roster ==
1963–64 San Francisco Warriors roster
Players

Pos.	No.	Player	Height	Weight	DOB	From
G	16	Al Attles	6 ft 0 in (1.83 m)	175 lb (79 kg)	1936–11–07	North Carolina A&T
C	13	Wilt Chamberlain	7 ft 1 in (2.16 m)	275 lb (125 kg)	1936–08–21	Kansas
F	55	Wayne Hightower	6 ft 8 in (2.03 m)	192 lb (87 kg)	1940–01–14	Kansas
G	12	Gary Hill	6 ft 4 in (1.93 m)	185 lb (84 kg)	1941–10–07	Oklahoma City
G/F	9	George Lee	6 ft 4 in (1.93 m)	200 lb (91 kg)	1936–11–23	Michigan
F	14	Tom Meschery	6 ft 6 in (1.98 m)	215 lb (98 kg)	1938–10–26	Saint Mary's
G	7	Gary Phillips	6 ft 3 in (1.91 m)	189 lb (86 kg)	1939–12–07	Houston
G	5	Guy Rodgers	6 ft 0 in (1.83 m)	185 lb (84 kg)	1935–09–01	Temple
F	17	Kenny Sears	6 ft 9 in (2.06 m)	198 lb (90 kg)	1933–08–17	Santa Clara
F/C	42	Nate Thurmond	6 ft 11 in (2.11 m)	225 lb (102 kg)	1941–07–25	Bowling Green
F	15	John Windsor	6 ft 8 in (2.03 m)	215 lb (98 kg)	1940–04–03	Stanford

Coaches
Head coach
- (United States) Alex Hannum (USC)

Legend
- (DP) Unsigned draft pick
- (FA) Free agent
- (S) Suspended
- Injured

Roster

== Regular season ==
=== Season standings ===
Western Division	W	L	PCT	GB	Home	Road	Neutral	Div
x-San Francisco Warriors	48	32	.600	–	25–14	21–15	2–3	29–17
x-St. Louis Hawks	46	34	.575	2	27–12	17–19	2–3	30–16
x-Los Angeles Lakers	42	38	.525	6	24–12	15–21	3–5	24–22
Baltimore Bullets	31	49	.388	17	20–19	8–21	3–9	16–24
Detroit Pistons	23	57	.288	25	9–21	6–25	8–11	13–33

x – clinched playoff spot

=== Game log ===
1963–64 game log
#	Date	Opponent	Score	High points	Attendance	Record
1	October 19	@ Baltimore	103–102	Wilt Chamberlain (23)	—	1–0
2	October 22	@ Cincinnati	97–103	Wilt Chamberlain (36)	—	1–1
3	October 23	@ St. Louis	99–95	Wilt Chamberlain (22)	—	2–1
4	October 26	Cincinnati	99–102	Wilt Chamberlain (21)	—	3–1
5	October 29	Cincinnati	108–101	Wilt Chamberlain (32)	—	3–2
6	November 2	Los Angeles	99–118	Wilt Chamberlain (55)	—	4–2
7	November 7	New York	88–110	Wilt Chamberlain (23)	—	5–2
8	November 8	@ Los Angeles	90–93	Wilt Chamberlain (33)	—	5–3
9	November 9	New York^{[a]}	89–84	Wilt Chamberlain (30)	3,141	5–4
10	November 12	@ Philadelphia	102–106 (OT)	Wilt Chamberlain (31)	—	5–5
11	November 13	@ Cincinnati	98–92	Wilt Chamberlain (49)	—	6–5
12	November 14	@ St. Louis	105–117	Wilt Chamberlain (34)	—	6–6
13	November 15	Detroit	101–98	Wilt Chamberlain (23)	—	6–7
14	November 17	Detroit	96–120	Wilt Chamberlain (37)	—	7–7
15	November 19	St. Louis	96–129	Wilt Chamberlain (40)	—	8–7
16	November 26	Cincinnati^{[b]}	112–123	Wilt Chamberlain (23)	14,585	8–8
17	November 27	New York^{[c]}	118–89	Wilt Chamberlain (38)	3,909	9–8
18	November 29	@ Baltimore	99–100	Wilt Chamberlain (38)	—	9–9
19	November 30	@ Boston	96–109	Guy Rodgers (24)	—	9–10
20	December 3	@ New York	116–108	Wayne Hightower (23)	—	10–10
21	December 4	@ St. Louis	83–105	Wilt Chamberlain (21)	—	10–11
22	December 6	Los Angeles	110–103	Wilt Chamberlain (59)	—	10–12
23	December 8	@ Los Angeles	114–112	Wilt Chamberlain (31)	—	11–12
24	December 10	Baltimore^{[a]}	108–117	Wilt Chamberlain (49)	1,504	12–12
25	December 13	Baltimore	116–114 (OT)	Wilt Chamberlain (43)	—	12–13
26	December 15	Baltimore	97–122	Wilt Chamberlain (44)	—	13–13
27	December 17	St. Louis	106–110	Wilt Chamberlain (34)	—	14–13
28	December 18	St. Louis^{[d]}	96–104	Wilt Chamberlain (27)	2,872	15–13
29	December 20	Philadelphia	114–112	Wilt Chamberlain (41)	—	15–14
30	December 22	Philadelphia	104–118	Wilt Chamberlain (40)	—	16–14
31	December 26	@ Philadelphia	112–118	Wilt Chamberlain (49)	—	16–15
32	December 28	@ Baltimore	106–104	Chamberlain, Hightower (26)	—	17–15
33	December 30	Detroit^{[e]}	112–114 (OT)	Wilt Chamberlain (47)	3,364	17–16
34	December 31	@ New York	101–79	Wilt Chamberlain (42)	—	18–16
35	January 2	St. Louis^{[a]}	111–106	Wilt Chamberlain (42)	4,281	18–17
36	January 3	Boston	111–101	Wilt Chamberlain (24)	—	18–18
37	January 7	Boston	89–92	Wilt Chamberlain (35)	—	19–18
38	January 9	New York^{[f]}	97–112	Wilt Chamberlain (43)	1,609	20–18
39	January 10	Los Angeles	89–114	Wilt Chamberlain (50)	—	21–18
40	January 12	New York^{[a]}	105–112	Wilt Chamberlain (47)	2,161	22–18
41	January 15	@ Detroit	89–79	Wilt Chamberlain (32)	—	23–18
42	January 17	@ Philadelphia	112–91	Wilt Chamberlain (36)	—	24–18
43	January 18	@ Baltimore	86–93	Wilt Chamberlain (28)	—	24–19
44	January 19	@ Boston	105–108	Wilt Chamberlain (31)	—	24–20
45	January 21	Detroit	88–100	Wilt Chamberlain (24)	—	25–20
46	January 23	Detroit	93–125	Wilt Chamberlain (28)	—	26–20
47	January 24	@ Los Angeles	100–118	Wilt Chamberlain (41)	—	26–21
48	January 25	Los Angeles	95–120	Wilt Chamberlain (40)	—	27–21
49	January 26	@ Los Angeles	96–108	Wilt Chamberlain (49)	—	27–22
50	January 28	@ Philadelphia	139–117	Wilt Chamberlain (59)	—	28–22
51	January 29	@ Boston	100–92	Wilt Chamberlain (28)	—	29–22
52	January 30	@ Detroit	100–109	Wilt Chamberlain (42)	—	29–23
53	February 1	@ New York	125–106	Wilt Chamberlain (40)	—	30–23
54	February 2	@ Baltimore	120–118 (OT)	Wayne Hightower (33)	—	31–23
55	February 4	Detroit	79–118	Wilt Chamberlain (38)	—	32–23
56	February 6	Detroit^{[g]}	97–104	Wilt Chamberlain (40)	2,906	33–23
57	February 8	@ St. Louis	103–97	Wilt Chamberlain (30)	—	34–23
58	February 9	@ St. Louis	111–116	Wilt Chamberlain (32)	—	34–24
59	February 11	@ Detroit	128–118 (OT)	Wilt Chamberlain (59)	—	35–24
60	February 13	Boston	95–106	Wilt Chamberlain (30)	—	36–24
61	February 15	Boston	96–87	Wilt Chamberlain (32)	—	36–25
62	February 17	Cincinnati^{[h]}	113–129	Wilt Chamberlain (52)	11,595	36–26
63	February 18	Detroit^{[i]}	108–98	Wilt Chamberlain (52)	3,875	37–26
64	February 19	@ Cincinnati	108–101	Wilt Chamberlain (32)	—	38–26
65	February 21	Cincinnati	101–93	Wilt Chamberlain (40)	—	38–27
66	February 23	Los Angeles	108–109	Wilt Chamberlain (37)	—	39–27
67	February 25	Cincinnati	108–117	Wilt Chamberlain (52)	—	40–27
68	February 27	@ St. Louis	107–97	Wilt Chamberlain (40)	—	41–27
69	February 28	@ Boston	92–107	Wilt Chamberlain (30)	—	41–28
70	February 29	@ New York	136–110	Wilt Chamberlain (37)	—	42–28
71	March 1	@ Detroit	100–86	Wilt Chamberlain (38)	—	43–28
72	March 2	St. Louis	111–102	Wilt Chamberlain (27)	—	43–29
73	March 5	St. Louis	104–102	Wilt Chamberlain (44)	—	43–30
74	March 7	@ Los Angeles	120–118	Wilt Chamberlain (47)	—	44–30
75	March 10	Baltimore	111–129	Wilt Chamberlain (32)	—	45–30
76	March 12	Baltimore	102–125	Wilt Chamberlain (35)	—	46–30
77	March 13	Los Angeles	112–109	Wilt Chamberlain (35)	—	46–31
78	March 14	@ Los Angeles	111–95	Wilt Chamberlain (55)	—	47–31
79	March 16	Philadelphia	111–110	Wilt Chamberlain (30)	—	47–32
80	March 18	Philadelphia	85–89	Wilt Chamberlain (36)	—	48–32

Footnotes

- ^{a} The game was held at the Oakland Civic Auditorium in Oakland, California.
- ^{b} The game was held at Madison Square Garden in New York, New York.
- ^{c} The game was held at Boston Garden in Boston, Massachusetts.
- ^{d} The game was held at Sacramento High School in Sacramento, California.
- ^{e} The game was held at The Field House in Toledo, Ohio.
- ^{f} The game was held at Richmond Memorial Auditorium in Richmond, California.
- ^{g} The game was held at San Jose Civic Auditorium in San Jose, California.
- ^{h} The game was held at Cleveland Arena, in Cleveland, Ohio.
- ^{i} The game was held at Lansing Civic Center in Lansing, Michigan.

== Playoffs ==
1964 playoff game log
Division finals: 4–3 (home: 3–1; road: 1–2)

Game	Date	Team	Score	High points	High rebounds	High assists	Location Attendance	Series
1	April 1	St. Louis	L 111–116	Wilt Chamberlain (37)	Wilt Chamberlain (22)	Guy Rodgers (11)	War Memorial Gymnasium; 5,231	0–1
2	April 3	St. Louis	W 120–85	Wilt Chamberlain (28)	Wilt Chamberlain (27)	Guy Rodgers (8)	Cow Palace; 9,063	1–1
3	April 5	@ St. Louis	L 109–113	Wilt Chamberlain (46)	Wilt Chamberlain (23)	Phillips, Rodgers (4)	Kiel Auditorium; 10,163	1–2
4	April 8	@ St. Louis	W 111–109	Wilt Chamberlain (36)	Wilt Chamberlain (23)	Guy Rodgers (8)	Kiel Auditorium; 10,118	2–2
5	April 10	St. Louis	W 121–97	Wilt Chamberlain (50)	Chamberlain, Thurmond (15)	Guy Rodgers (12)	Cow Palace; 10,628	3–2
6	April 12	@ St. Louis	L 95–123	Wilt Chamberlain (34)	Wilt Chamberlain (24)	Guy Rodgers (7)	Kiel Auditorium; 8,967	3–3
7	April 16	St. Louis	W 105–95	Wilt Chamberlain (39)	Wilt Chamberlain (30)	Guy Rodgers (8)	Cow Palace; 8,923	4–3

NBA Finals: 1–4 (home: 1–1; road: 0–3)

Game	Date	Team	Score	High points	High rebounds	High assists	Location Attendance	Series
1	April 18	@ Boston	L 96–108	Wilt Chamberlain (22)	Wilt Chamberlain (23)	Guy Rodgers (8)	Boston Garden; 13,909	0–1
2	April 20	@ Boston	L 101–124	Wilt Chamberlain (32)	Wilt Chamberlain (25)	Phillips, Rodgers (4)	Boston Garden; 13,909	0–2
3	April 22	Boston	W 115–91	Wilt Chamberlain (35)	Wilt Chamberlain (25)	Guy Rodgers (7)	Cow Palace; 10,981	1–2
4	April 24	Boston	L 95–98	Wilt Chamberlain (27)	Wilt Chamberlain (38)	Guy Rodgers (6)	Cow Palace; 14,862	1–3
5	April 26	@ Boston	L 99–105	Wilt Chamberlain (30)	Wilt Chamberlain (27)	Guy Rodgers (7)	Boston Garden; 13,909	1–4

1964 schedule

== Awards and records ==
- Wilt Chamberlain: NBA All-Star Game, NBA scoring champion, All-NBA First Team
- Alex Hannum: NBA Coach of the Year Award
- Nate Thurmond, NBA All-Rookie Team 1st Team
