= Gary Phillips (basketball) =

American basketball player (1939–2025)

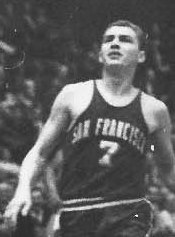
- Phillips with the San Francisco Warriors in 1964

Personal information
- Born: December 7, 1939 Quincy, Illinois, U.S.
- Died: January 26, 2025 (aged 85) Austin, Texas, U.S.
- Listed height: 6 ft 3 in (1.91 m)
- Listed weight: 189 lb (86 kg)

Career information
- High school: Quincy (Quincy, Illinois)
- College: Houston (1958–1961)
- NBA draft: 1961: 1st round, 9th overall pick
- Drafted by: Boston Celtics
- Playing career: 1961–1966
- Position: Point guard / shooting guard
- Number: 21, 34, 7

Career history
- 1961–1962: Boston Celtics
- 1962–1966: San Francisco Warriors

Career highlights
- NBA champion (1962); First-team All-American – USBWA (1961); 2× First-team All-MVC (1959, 1960)

Career statistics
- Points: 2,319 (6.7 ppg)
- Rebounds: 903 (2.6 rpg)
- Assists: 665 (1.9 apg)
- Stats at NBA.com
- Stats at Basketball Reference

Gary A. Phillips (December 7, 1939 – January 26, 2025) was an American basketball player.

A 6 ft 3 in (1.91 m) guard, Phillips starred at the University of Houston during the late 1950s and early 1960s. He was the University of Houston's first All-American basketball player, earning Second-team All-American honors in 1959–60 and First-team honors in 1960–61. A two-time All-Missouri Valley Conference selection, Phillips ended his college career having scored 1,452 points.

He played five seasons (1961–1966) in the National Basketball Association (NBA) as a member of the Boston Celtics and San Francisco Warriors.

Phillips died on January 26, 2025, at the age of 85.

== Career statistics ==
Legend
GP	Games played	GS	Games started	MPG	Minutes per game
FG%	Field goal percentage	3P%	3-point field goal percentage	FT%	Free throw percentage
RPG	Rebounds per game	APG	Assists per game	SPG	Steals per game
BPG	Blocks per game	PPG	Points per game	**Bold**	Career high
†	Won an NBA championship

=== NBA ===
==== Regular season ====
Year	Team	GP	MPG	FG%	FT%	RPG	APG	PPG
1961–62†	Boston	67	10.6	.355	.581	1.6	1.0	4.0
1962–63	San Francisco	**75**	24.0	**.398**	.638	3.0	1.8	8.1
1963–64	San Francisco	66	**30.5**	.370	**.670**	**3.8**	**3.1**	**10.0**
1964–65	San Francisco	73	21.1	.358	.603	2.6	2.0	7.1
1965–66	San Francisco	67	12.9	.350	.621	2.0	1.7	4.0
Career		348	19.9	.370	.629	2.6	1.9	6.7

==== Playoffs ====
Year	Team	GP	MPG	FG%	FT%	RPG	APG	PPG
1962†	Boston	6	5.3	.063	**.727**	.5	.2	1.7
1964	San Francisco	**11**	**23.3**	**.361**	.650	**2.2**	**1.8**	**8.7**
Career		17	16.9	.319	.667	1.6	1.2	6.2
