= 1963–64 Los Angeles Lakers season =

Season of National Basketball Association team the Los Angeles Lakers

- Head coach: Fred Schaus
- Arena: Los Angeles Memorial Sports Arena

Results
- Record: 42–38 (.525)
- Place: Division: 3rd (Western)
- Playoff finish: Division semifinals (lost to Hawks 2–3)
- Stats at Basketball Reference

Local media
- Television: KHJ-TV
- Radio: KHJ

The 1963–64 Los Angeles Lakers season was the Lakers' 16th season in the NBA and fourth season in Los Angeles.

== Roster ==
1963–64 Los Angeles Lakers roster
Players

Pos.	No.	Player	Height	Weight	DOB	From
SG	5	Dick Barnett	6 ft 4 in (1.93 m)	190 lb (86 kg)	1936-10-02	Tennessee State
SF	22	Elgin Baylor	6 ft 5 in (1.96 m)	225 lb (102 kg)	1934-09-16	Seattle
C	25	Leroy Ellis	6 ft 11 in (2.11 m)	210 lb (95 kg)	1940-03-10	St. John's
PG	21	Jim King	6 ft 2 in (1.88 m)	175 lb (79 kg)	1941-02-07	Tulsa
C	32	Jim Krebs	6 ft 8 in (2.03 m)	230 lb (104 kg)	1935-09-08	SMU
PF	35	Rudy LaRusso	6 ft 7 in (2.01 m)	220 lb (100 kg)	1937-11-11	Dartmouth
SF	20	Don Nelson	6 ft 6 in (1.98 m)	210 lb (95 kg)	1940-05-15	Iowa
C	14	Hub Reed	6 ft 9 in (2.06 m)	215 lb (98 kg)	1936-10-04	Oklahoma City
SG	11	Frank Selvy	6 ft 3 in (1.91 m)	180 lb (82 kg)	1932-11-09	Furman
PG	44	Jerry West	6 ft 3 in (1.91 m)	175 lb (79 kg)	1938-05-28	West Virginia
C	12	Gene Wiley	6 ft 10 in (2.08 m)	210 lb (95 kg)	1937-11-12	Wichita State

Coaches
Head coach
- Fred Schaus

Legend
- (DP) Unsigned draft pick
- (FA) Free agent
- (S) Suspended
- Injured

Roster
Updated: October 1, 1963

== Regular season ==
=== Season standings ===
Western Division	W	L	PCT	GB	Home	Road	Neutral	Div
x-San Francisco Warriors	48	32	.600	–	25–14	21–15	2–3	29–17
x-St. Louis Hawks	46	34	.575	2	27–12	17–19	2–3	30–16
x-Los Angeles Lakers	42	38	.525	6	24–12	15–21	3–5	24–22
Baltimore Bullets	31	49	.388	17	20–19	8–21	3–9	16–24
Detroit Pistons	23	57	.288	25	9–21	6–25	8–11	13–33

x – clinched playoff spot

=== Game log ===
1963–64 game log
#	Date	Opponent	Score	High points	Record
1	October 19	@ St. Louis	108–117	Jerry West (30)	0–1
2	October 22	@ New York	130–117	Jerry West (26)	1–1
3	October 23	@ Detroit	124–116	Jerry West (31)	2–1
4	October 25	@ Cincinnati	122–109	Jerry West (27)	3–1
5	October 30	Cincinnati	115–107	Jerry West (37)	3–2
6	November 1	Cincinnati	112–122	Barnett, West (29)	4–2
7	November 2	@ San Francisco	99–118	Jerry West (33)	4–3
8	November 6	New York	109–111	Jerry West (35)	5–3
9	November 8	San Francisco	90–93	Jerry West (30)	6–3
10	November 10	New York	79–104	Elgin Baylor (21)	7–3
11	November 11	N Detroit	109–116	Elgin Baylor (28)	7–4
12	November 13	N Boston	110–114	Jerry West (35)	7–5
13	November 14	@ Baltimore	123–115	Barnett, West (31)	8–5
14	November 15	@ Philadelphia	97–99	Elgin Baylor (30)	8–6
15	November 16	Detroit	95–115	Jerry West (24)	9–6
16	November 17	St. Louis	117–112	Elgin Baylor (30)	9–7
17	November 21	St. Louis	99–111	Jerry West (35)	10–7
18	November 26	@ New York	119–112	Jerry West (33)	11–7
19	November 27	@ Boston	78–114	Ellis, West (16)	11–8
20	November 29	@ Detroit	127–111	Elgin Baylor (37)	12–8
21	November 30	@ St. Louis	97–96	Jerry West (26)	13–8
22	December 1	@ Cincinnati	114–109	Jerry West (37)	14–8
23	December 4	@ Baltimore	98–118	Jerry West (29)	14–9
24	December 6	@ San Francisco	110–103	Jerry West (27)	15–9
25	December 8	San Francisco	114–112	Elgin Baylor (32)	15–10
26	December 9	N Baltimore	134–120	Dick Barnett (38)	16–10
27	December 12	Baltimore	105–120	Jerry West (37)	17–10
28	December 14	Baltimore	108–113	Jerry West (38)	18–10
29	December 15	St. Louis	102–95	Dick Barnett (21)	18–11
30	December 18	Philadelphia	96–116	Jerry West (30)	19–11
31	December 21	Philadelphia	113–126	Elgin Baylor (31)	20–11
32	December 25	@ New York	134–126	Jerry West (47)	21–11
33	December 26	@ Boston	110–126	Jerry West (22)	21–12
34	December 28	@ Philadelphia	100–114	Jerry West (29)	21–13
35	December 29	N Detroit	140–128	Jerry West (39)	22–13
36	December 31	St. Louis	119–132	Jerry West (39)	23–13
37	January 4	Boston	118–125 (OT)	Jerry West (36)	24–13
38	January 5	Boston	95–97	Jerry West (29)	25–13
39	January 8	New York	118–136	Jerry West (39)	26–13
40	January 10	@ San Francisco	89–114	Baylor, West (21)	26–14
41	January 11	N New York	118–108	Elgin Baylor (30)	26–15
42	January 15	@ St. Louis	111–109	Jerry West (36)	27–15
43	January 16	@ Cincinnati	95–108	Dick Barnett (21)	27–16
44	January 17	@ Boston	79–99	Elgin Baylor (22)	27–17
45	January 18	N Philadelphia	111–115	Jerry West (41)	28–17
46	January 20	Detroit	118–107	Baylor, West (26)	28–18
47	January 22	Detroit	101–110	Jerry West (42)	29–18
48	January 24	San Francisco	100–118	Jerry West (34)	30–18
49	January 25	@ San Francisco	95–120	Dick Barnett (23)	30–19
50	January 26	San Francisco	96–108	Jerry West (31)	31–19
51	January 28	@ Detroit	92–93	Elgin Baylor (25)	31–20
52	January 29	N Philadelphia	102–97	Elgin Baylor (34)	31–21
53	January 30	@ Baltimore	89–107	Rudy LaRusso (24)	31–22
54	February 1	@ St. Louis	96–113	Elgin Baylor (27)	31–23
55	February 2	@ St. Louis	105–107	Elgin Baylor (27)	31–24
56	February 4	@ Cincinnati	100–118	Rudy LaRusso (27)	31–25
57	February 5	Detroit	85–111	Elgin Baylor (37)	32–25
58	February 7	Detroit	111–103	Elgin Baylor (40)	32–26
59	February 8	@ Philadelphia	101–109	Elgin Baylor (24)	32–27
60	February 9	@ Baltimore	110–119	Elgin Baylor (22)	32–28
61	February 11	@ Boston	113–109	Jerry West (40)	33–28
62	February 12	Boston	104–97 (OT)	Jerry West (31)	33–29
63	February 16	Boston	92–90	Elgin Baylor (33)	33–30
64	February 18	@ New York	117–118	Jerry West (41)	33–31
65	February 19	N Detroit	115–116	Elgin Baylor (34)	33–32
66	February 20	@ Detroit	106–101	Elgin Baylor (26)	34–32
67	February 22	Cincinnati	107–105	Jerry West (43)	34–33
68	February 23	@ San Francisco	108–109	Elgin Baylor (29)	34–34
69	February 26	Cincinnati	97–103	Elgin Baylor (35)	35–34
70	February 28	@ Baltimore	115–112	Jerry West (33)	36–34
71	February 29	@ St. Louis	114–115 (OT)	Elgin Baylor (30)	36–35
72	March 1	St. Louis	91–114	Jerry West (37)	37–35
73	March 4	St. Louis	110–105	Elgin Baylor (31)	37–36
74	March 7	San Francisco	120–118	Elgin Baylor (35)	37–37
75	March 9	Baltimore	112–122	Jerry West (37)	38–37
76	March 11	Baltimore	109–115	Elgin Baylor (25)	39–37
77	March 13	@ San Francisco	112–109	Jerry West (38)	40–37
78	March 14	San Francisco	111–95	Elgin Baylor (28)	40–38
79	March 15	Philadelphia	95–120	Elgin Baylor (34)	41–38
80	March 17	Philadelphia	97–121	Jerry West (31)	42–38

== Playoffs ==
1964 playoff game log
Division semifinals: 2–3 (home: 2–0; road: 0–3)

Game	Date	Team	Score	High points	High rebounds	High assists	Location Attendance	Series
1	March 21	@ St. Louis	L 104–115	Jerry West (35)	Elgin Baylor (15)	Dick Barnett (5)	Kiel Auditorium; 7,214	0–1
2	March 22	@ St. Louis	L 90–106	Elgin Baylor (20)	LeRoy Ellis (8)	Jim King (4)	Kiel Auditorium; 7,014	0–2
3	March 25	St. Louis	W 107–105	Jerry West (39)	Elgin Baylor (16)	Elgin Baylor (11)	Los Angeles Memorial Sports Arena; 11,728	1–2
4	March 28	St. Louis	W 97–88	Jerry West (39)	LeRoy Ellis (11)	Elgin Baylor (10)	Los Angeles Memorial Sports Arena; 13,862	2–2
5	March 30	@ St. Louis	L 108–121	Elgin Baylor (28)	Elgin Baylor (11)	Dick Barnett (4)	Kiel Auditorium; 9,574	2–3

1964 schedule

== Awards and records ==
- Elgin Baylor: All-NBA First Team, NBA All-Star Game
- Jerry West: All-NBA First Team, NBA All-Star Game
