= 1963–64 Detroit Pistons season =

NBA team season

- Head coach: Charles Wolf
- Owner: Fred Zollner
- Arena: Cobo Center

Results
- Record: 23–57 (.288)
- Place: Division: 5th (Western)
- Playoff finish: Did not qualify
- Stats at Basketball Reference

Local media
- Television: WJBK
- Radio: WXYZ

The 1963–64 Detroit Pistons season was the Detroit Pistons' 16th season in the NBA and seventh season in the city of Detroit. The team played at Cobo Arena in Detroit.

The Pistons finished with a 23-57 (.288) record, last place (5th) in the Western Division. The team was led on the season by forward Bailey Howell (21.6 ppg, 10.1 rpg, NBA All-Star), center Ray Scott (17.6 ppg, 13.5 rpg) and guard Don Ohl 17.3 ppg, NBA All-Star.

The Pistons bristled under coach Charles Wolf, with Sports Illustrated describing the team as "the unhappiest team ever assembled. Wolf did not smoke or drink or swear or run around late at night and he was hell-bent on making sure no one else did either. Midseason practice sessions consisted of push-ups, sit-ups and lectures. "We had to raise our hand if we wanted to go to the bathroom," said one player. And during a game, one missed shot or bad pass meant a trip to the pines, as Piston center Reggie Harding refers to bench time. 'I'd trade every one of you,' Wolf once told his players in an effort to build up their confidence, 'except you're so bad no one will have you.'"

== Draft picks ==
Round	Pick	Player	Position	Nationality	College / Team
1	4	Eddie Miles	G	United States	Seattle
6	48	Reggie Harding	C	United States	Holland Oilers (MPBL)

== Roster ==
1963–64 Detroit Pistons roster
Players

Pos.	No.	Player	Height	Weight	DOB	From
G	24	Donnis Butcher	6 ft 2 in (1.88 m)	200 lb (91 kg)	1936–02–08	Pikeville
F	22	Dave DeBusschere	6 ft 6 in (1.98 m)	220 lb (100 kg)	1940–10–16	Detroit Mercy
G	25	Bob Duffy	6 ft 3 in (1.91 m)	185 lb (84 kg)	1940–09–26	Colgate
C	16	Bob Ferry	6 ft 8 in (2.03 m)	230 lb (104 kg)	1937–05–31	Saint Louis
C	19	Reggie Harding	7 ft 0 in (2.13 m)	249 lb (113 kg)	1942–05–04	Nashville Christian Institute (TN)
F	18	Bailey Howell	6 ft 7 in (2.01 m)	210 lb (95 kg)	1937–01–20	Mississippi State
C	17	Darrall Imhoff	6 ft 10 in (2.08 m)	220 lb (100 kg)	1938–10–11	California
G	5	Willie Jones	6 ft 3 in (1.91 m)	185 lb (84 kg)	1936–06–29	Northwestern
G	14	Eddie Miles	6 ft 4 in (1.93 m)	195 lb (88 kg)	1940–07–05	Seattle
F	15	Jackie Moreland	6 ft 7 in (2.01 m)	215 lb (98 kg)	1938–03–11	Louisiana Tech
G	10	Don Ohl	6 ft 3 in (1.91 m)	190 lb (86 kg)	1936–04–18	Illinois
F	12	Ray Scott	6 ft 9 in (2.06 m)	215 lb (98 kg)	1938–07–12	Portland

Coaches
Head coach
- Charles Wolf

Legend
- (DP) Unsigned draft pick
- (FA) Free agent
- (S) Suspended
- Injured

Roster
Updated: 1963–12–16

== Regular season ==
=== Season standings ===
Western Division	W	L	PCT	GB	Home	Road	Neutral	Div
x-San Francisco Warriors	48	32	.600	–	25–14	21–15	2–3	29–17
x-St. Louis Hawks	46	34	.575	2	27–12	17–19	2–3	30–16
x-Los Angeles Lakers	42	38	.525	6	24–12	15–21	3–5	24–22
Baltimore Bullets	31	49	.388	17	20–19	8–21	3–9	16–24
Detroit Pistons	23	57	.288	25	9–21	6–25	8–11	13–33

x – clinched playoff spot

=== Game log ===
1963–64 Game log
#	Date	Opponent	Score	High points	Record
1	October 16	Philadelphia	117–115	Don Ohl (23)	0–1
2	October 19	@ Philadelphia	124–121	Bailey Howell (28)	1–1
3	October 23	Los Angeles	124–116	Don Ohl (25)	1–2
4	October 26	@ St. Louis	103–127	Bailey Howell (27)	1–3
5	October 30	Boston	108–102	Bailey Howell (21)	1–4
6	November 2	@ Boston	109–117	Ray Scott (23)	1–5
7	November 6	Philadelphia	101–119	Ray Scott (30)	2–5
8	November 9	@ Cincinnati	109–118	Jackie Moreland (21)	2–6
9	November 11	N Los Angeles	109–116	Egan, Ohl (27)	3–6
10	November 15	@ San Francisco	101–98	Bob Ferry (16)	4–6
11	November 16	@ Los Angeles	95–115	Moreland, Scott (15)	4–7
12	November 17	@ San Francisco	96–120	Eddie Miles (27)	4–8
13	November 19	N Cincinnati	102–127	Ray Scott (20)	4–9
14	November 20	Cincinnati	118–124	Don Ohl (34)	5–9
15	November 23	@ New York	99–108	Bailey Howell (25)	5–10
16	November 27	St. Louis	113–105	Howell, Ohl (18)	5–11
17	November 28	@ St. Louis	101–118	Ray Scott (20)	5–12
18	November 29	Los Angeles	127–111	Ray Scott (21)	5–13
19	November 30	N Baltimore	101–120	Bailey Howell (20)	5–14
20	December 1	N Philadelphia	132–121	Bailey Howell (32)	5–15
21	December 4	New York	120–119	Ray Scott (30)	5–16
22	December 6	St. Louis	108–112 (OT)	Bailey Howell (35)	6–16
23	December 11	Cincinnati	127–107	Larry Staverman (21)	6–17
24	December 14	@ St. Louis	92–104	Bailey Howell (24)	6–18
25	December 17	@ New York	107–103	Ray Scott (19)	7–18
26	December 18	Baltimore	124–107	Ray Scott (27)	7–19
27	December 21	St. Louis	100–91	Bailey Howell (25)	7–20
28	December 26	@ Baltimore	108–110	Don Ohl (27)	7–21
29	December 27	N Philadelphia	119–107	Ray Scott (22)	7–22
30	December 29	N Los Angeles	140–128	Bailey Howell (25)	7–23
31	December 30	N San Francisco	112–114 (OT)	Bailey Howell (28)	8–23
32	January 2	N Cincinnati	111–112	Bailey Howell (33)	8–24
33	January 5	@ St. Louis	99–116	Bailey Howell (28)	8–25
34	January 8	Baltimore	106–99	Ferry, Howell (17)	8–26
35	January 9	N Baltimore	125–115	Bailey Howell (35)	9–26
36	January 11	St. Louis	112–107	Bailey Howell (21)	9–27
37	January 12	@ Cincinnati	88–120	Bailey Howell (15)	9–28
38	January 15	San Francisco	89–79	Bailey Howell (21)	9–29
39	January 16	N New York	124–116	Bailey Howell (33)	9–30
40	January 17	N New York	99–101	Bailey Howell (27)	10–30
41	January 18	Boston	121–115	Willie Jones (29)	10–31
42	January 20	@ Los Angeles	118–107	Bailey Howell (35)	11–31
43	January 21	@ San Francisco	88–100	Don Ohl (17)	11–32
44	January 22	@ Los Angeles	101–110	Bailey Howell (23)	11–33
45	January 23	@ San Francisco	93–125	Ray Scott (16)	11–34
46	January 25	St. Louis	107–98	Bailey Howell (28)	11–35
47	January 26	@ St. Louis	104–106	Don Ohl (22)	11–36
48	January 28	Los Angeles	92–93	Harding, Howell (16)	12–36
49	January 30	San Francisco	100–109	Don Ohl (29)	13–36
50	February 1	@ Baltimore	112–111	Bailey Howell (25)	14–36
51	February 4	@ San Francisco	79–118	Ray Scott (19)	14–37
52	February 5	@ Los Angeles	85–111	Ray Scott (26)	14–38
53	February 6	@ San Francisco	97–104	Bailey Howell (33)	14–39
54	February 7	@ Los Angeles	111–103	Bailey Howell (30)	15–39
55	February 9	@ Cincinnati	107–135	Ray Scott (21)	15–40
56	February 11	San Francisco	128–118 (OT)	Bailey Howell (23)	15–41
57	February 12	N Cincinnati	121–147	Ray Scott (28)	15–42
58	February 14	@ Philadelphia	123–130	Bailey Howell (27)	15–43
59	February 15	@ Baltimore	122–124	Bailey Howell (27)	15–44
60	February 16	Baltimore	111–99	Ray Scott (21)	15–45
61	February 18	N San Francisco	108–98	Don Ohl (29)	15–46
62	February 19	N Los Angeles	115–116	Ray Scott (23)	16–46
63	February 20	Los Angeles	106–101	Bailey Howell (24)	16–47
64	February 22	New York	125–119 (OT)	Don Ohl (33)	16–48
65	February 23	@ Baltimore	104–129	Don Ohl (23)	16–49
66	February 24	Boston	113–115	Reggie Harding (23)	17–49
67	February 26	Philadelphia	130–122	Bailey Howell (42)	17–50
68	February 28	N New York	110–112	Ray Scott (22)	18–50
69	February 29	N Boston	108–115	Don Ohl (29)	18–51
70	March 1	San Francisco	100–86	Bailey Howell (18)	18–52
71	March 5	N Baltimore	125–120	Reggie Harding (27)	19–52
72	March 7	Boston	112–94	Howell, Jones (14)	19–53
73	March 8	@ Boston	118–128	Don Ohl (32)	19–54
74	March 10	Cincinnati	103–114	Ray Scott (27)	20–54
75	March 12	N Boston	120–140	Bailey Howell (19)	20–55
76	March 13	N Philadelphia	122–133	Don Ohl (32)	21–55
77	March 14	New York	124–126	Bailey Howell (33)	22–55
78	March 15	@ New York	125–139	Bailey Howell (27)	22–56
79	March 17	@ St. Louis	99–115	Bailey Howell (20)	22–57
80	March 18	St. Louis	96–106	Don Ohl (28)	23–57
