= John Windsor =

American basketball player

Personal information
- Born: April 3, 1940 (age 86) Los Angeles, California, U.S.
- Listed height: 6 ft 8 in (2.03 m)
- Listed weight: 215 lb (98 kg)

Career information
- High school: Pembroke Country-Day (Kansas City, Missouri)
- College: Stanford (1959–1962)
- NBA draft: 1962: 5th round, 39th overall pick
- Drafted by: Syracuse Nationals
- Playing career: 1961–1963
- Position: Power forward
- Number: 15

Career history
- 1961–1962: Kansas City Steers
- 1963–1964: San Francisco Warriors

Career highlights
- First-team All-AAWU (1962); Second-team All-AAWU (1961)
- Stats at NBA.com
- Stats at Basketball Reference

John T. Windsor (born April 3, 1940) is an American former basketball player for the San Francisco Warriors in the National Basketball Association (NBA). He played one season with the Warriors in the 1963–64 season. Windsor played college basketball for the Stanford Cardinal, where he was an All-Athletic Association of Western Universities first team selection in 1962. He was drafted in the 1962 NBA draft in the fifth round with the 39th overall pick by the Syracuse Nationals. In August 1963, he was traded to the San Francisco Warriors.

== Career statistics ==
Legend
GP	Games played	GS	Games started	MPG	Minutes per game
FG%	Field goal percentage	3P%	3-point field goal percentage	FT%	Free throw percentage
RPG	Rebounds per game	APG	Assists per game	SPG	Steals per game
BPG	Blocks per game	PPG	Points per game	**Bold**	Career high

=== NBA ===
==== Regular season ====
Year	Team	GP	MPG	FG%	FT%	RPG	APG	PPG
1963–64	San Francisco	11	6.2	.370	.875	2.4	.2	2.5
