= 1963–64 Baltimore Bullets season =

- Head coach: Slick Leonard
- General manager: Paul Hoffman
- Owner: David Trager
- Arena: Baltimore Civic Center

Results
- Record: 31–49 (.388)
- Place: Division: 4th (Western)
- Playoff finish: Did not qualify
- Stats at Basketball Reference

Local media
- Television: WJZ-TV (Bill Gardner)
- Radio: WFBR (Jim Karvellas and Vince Bagli)

The 1963–64 Baltimore Bullets season was the Bullets' 3rd season in the NBA and 1st season in the city of Baltimore. This is also the first season where the NBA returned to Baltimore since the early parts of the 1954–55 season, when the original iteration of the Baltimore Bullets (unrelated to this team) folded their team on November 27, 1954.

== Roster ==
1963–64 Baltimore Bullets roster
Players

Pos.	No.	Player	Height	Weight	DOB	From
C	8	Walt Bellamy	6 ft 11 in (2.11 m)	225 lb (102 kg)	1939-07-24	Indiana
SF	35	Barney Cable	6 ft 7 in (2.01 m)	175 lb (79 kg)	1935-07-29	Bradley
SG	52	Larry Comley	6 ft 5 in (1.96 m)	210 lb (95 kg)	1939-08-17	Kansas State
SF	43	Terry Dischinger	6 ft 7 in (2.01 m)	189 lb (86 kg)	1940-11-21	Purdue
PG	21	Si Green	6 ft 2 in (1.88 m)	185 lb (84 kg)	1933-08-20	Duquesne
PF	23	Charles Hardnett	6 ft 8 in (2.03 m)	225 lb (102 kg)	1938-09-13	Grambling State
C	14	Paul Hogue	6 ft 9 in (2.06 m)	240 lb (109 kg)	1940-04-28	Cincinnati
PF	25	Gus Johnson	6 ft 6 in (1.98 m)	230 lb (104 kg)	1938-12-13	Idaho
SF	22	Don Kojis	6 ft 5 in (1.96 m)	215 lb (98 kg)	1939-01-15	Marquette
SG	52	Kevin Loughery	6 ft 3 in (1.91 m)	190 lb (86 kg)	1940-03-28	St. John's
G/F	16	Mel Peterson	6 ft 4 in (1.93 m)	185 lb (84 kg)	1938-03-23	Wheaton (IL)
PG	12	Gene Shue	6 ft 2 in (1.88 m)	170 lb (77 kg)	1931-12-18	Maryland
F	16	Roger Strickland	6 ft 5 in (1.96 m)	200 lb (91 kg)	1940-09-04	Jacksonville
SG	44	Rod Thorn	6 ft 4 in (1.93 m)	195 lb (88 kg)	1941-05-23	West Virginia

Coaches
Head coach
- Slick Leonard

Legend
- (DP) Unsigned draft pick
- (FA) Free agent
- (S) Suspended
- Injured

Roster
Updated: October 29, 1963

== Regular season ==
=== Season standings ===
Western Division	W	L	PCT	GB	Home	Road	Neutral	Div
x-San Francisco Warriors	48	32	.600	–	25–14	21–15	2–3	29–17
x-St. Louis Hawks	46	34	.575	2	27–12	17–19	2–3	30–16
x-Los Angeles Lakers	42	38	.525	6	24–12	15–21	3–5	24–22
Baltimore Bullets	31	49	.388	17	20–19	8–21	3–9	16–24
Detroit Pistons	23	57	.288	25	9–21	6–25	8–11	13–33

- x – clinched playoff spot

=== Game log ===
1963–64 game log
#	Date	Opponent	Score	High points	Record
1	October 16	Boston	109–95	Walt Bellamy (32)	0–1
2	October 17	@ New York	115–113	Terry Dischinger (25)	1–1
3	October 19	San Francisco	103–102	Walt Bellamy (36)	1–2
4	October 23	New York	106–115	Walt Bellamy (45)	2–2
5	October 26	@ Boston	108–123	Terry Dischinger (30)	2–3
6	October 27	St. Louis	123–112	Gus Johnson (34)	2–4
7	October 30	Philadelphia	111–108	Terry Dischinger (29)	2–5
8	November 2	@ New York	105–123	Terry Dischinger (28)	2–6
9	November 6	St. Louis	112–110	Terry Dischinger (26)	2–7
10	November 9	Philadelphia	100–116	Terry Dischinger (24)	3–7
11	November 14	Los Angeles	123–115	Terry Dischinger (36)	3–8
12	November 16	@ St. Louis	112–115	Walt Bellamy (46)	3–9
13	November 17	@ Cincinnati	109–110	Walt Bellamy (27)	3–10
14	November 26	@ Philadelphia	113–115	Walt Bellamy (42)	3–11
15	November 27	Cincinnati	122–119	Terry Dischinger (29)	3–12
16	November 29	San Francisco	99–100	Sihugo Green (25)	4–12
17	November 30	N Detroit	101–120	Walt Bellamy (36)	5–12
18	December 4	Los Angeles	98–118	Walt Bellamy (48)	6–12
19	December 6	N New York	102–116	Walt Bellamy (36)	7–12
20	December 7	Boston	114–97	Terry Dischinger (29)	7–13
21	December 9	N Los Angeles	134–120	Terry Dischinger (37)	7–14
22	December 10	@ San Francisco	108–117	Walt Bellamy (36)	7–15
23	December 12	@ Los Angeles	105–120	Walt Bellamy (23)	7–16
24	December 13	@ San Francisco	116–114 (OT)	Rod Thorn (26)	8–16
25	December 14	@ Los Angeles	108–113	Rod Thorn (29)	8–17
26	December 15	@ San Francisco	97–122	Don Kojis (23)	8–18
27	December 17	N Boston	131–114	Walt Bellamy (45)	8–19
28	December 18	@ Detroit	124–107	Gus Johnson (38)	9–19
29	December 20	@ Cincinnati	96–103	Walt Bellamy (32)	9–20
30	December 21	Cincinnati	106–108	Terry Dischinger (26)	10–20
31	December 22	@ St. Louis	104–116	Walt Bellamy (38)	10–21
32	December 26	Detroit	108–110	Walt Bellamy (26)	11–21
33	December 28	San Francisco	106–104	Bellamy, Thorn (23)	11–22
34	January 2	New York	109–124	Terry Dischinger (36)	12–22
35	January 3	N New York	120–118	Terry Dischinger (24)	12–23
36	January 4	Philadelphia	123–113	Gus Johnson (34)	12–24
37	January 5	@ Cincinnati	106–111	Terry Dischinger (26)	12–25
38	January 7	@ St. Louis	113–123	Walt Bellamy (37)	12–26
39	January 8	@ Detroit	106–99	Walt Bellamy (26)	13–26
40	January 9	N Detroit	125–115	Walt Bellamy (33)	13–27
41	January 12	@ St. Louis	117–113	Johnson, Thorn (28)	14–27
42	January 15	Boston	113–108	Dischinger, Thorn (23)	14–28
43	January 18	San Francisco	86–93	Kevin Loughery (20)	15–28
44	January 19	New York	109–107	Bellamy, Johnson (21)	15–29
45	January 21	N Philadelphia	121–124	Walt Bellamy (37)	16–29
46	January 22	Philadelphia	116–124	Walt Bellamy (31)	17–29
47	January 23	New York	114–130	Walt Bellamy (31)	18–29
48	January 25	Cincinnati	99–115	Walt Bellamy (25)	19–29
49	January 26	@ Philadelphia	131–120	Walt Bellamy (42)	20–29
50	January 30	Los Angeles	89–107	Walt Bellamy (29)	21–29
51	January 31	N Cincinnati	118–106	Dischinger, Green (17)	21–30
52	February 1	Detroit	112–111	Rod Thorn (30)	21–31
53	February 2	San Francisco	120–118 (OT)	Rod Thorn (26)	21–32
54	February 4	@ New York	137–134 (OT)	Gus Johnson (40)	22–32
55	February 5	St. Louis	106–113	Walt Bellamy (31)	23–32
56	February 6	N Boston	94–92	Walt Bellamy (29)	23–33
57	February 8	Cincinnati	109–105	Walt Bellamy (35)	23–34
58	February 9	Los Angeles	110–119	Walt Bellamy (33)	24–34
59	February 12	Philadelphia	115–121	Gus Johnson (30)	25–34
60	February 15	Detroit	122–124	Walt Bellamy (36)	26–34
61	February 16	@ Detroit	111–99	Walt Bellamy (29)	27–34
62	February 17	St. Louis	115–110	Walt Bellamy (37)	27–35
63	February 19	@ Philadelphia	122–130	Terry Dischinger (24)	27–36
64	February 20	N Boston	129–113	Walt Bellamy (29)	27–37
65	February 21	St. Louis	113–115 (2OT)	Terry Dischinger (30)	28–37
66	February 23	Detroit	104–129	Walt Bellamy (32)	29–37
67	February 26	Boston	100–87	Walt Bellamy (22)	29–38
68	February 28	Los Angeles	115–112	Walt Bellamy (28)	29–39
69	March 1	Cincinnati	122–111	Walt Bellamy (23)	29–40
70	March 4	New York	108–115	Walt Bellamy (32)	30–40
71	March 5	N Detroit	125–120	Terry Dischinger (30)	30–41
72	March 7	@ Cincinnati	101–104	Sihugo Green (29)	30–42
73	March 8	@ St. Louis	117–135	Walt Bellamy (37)	30–43
74	March 9	@ Los Angeles	112–122	Walt Bellamy (33)	30–44
75	March 10	@ San Francisco	111–129	Walt Bellamy (31)	30–45
76	March 11	@ Los Angeles	109–115	Walt Bellamy (31)	30–46
77	March 12	@ San Francisco	102–125	Terry Dischinger (29)	30–47
78	March 14	N Philadelphia	128–122	Walt Bellamy (31)	30–48
79	March 15	@ Boston	105–129	Don Kojis (24)	30–49
80	March 18	Boston	95–108	Gus Johnson (28)	31–49

== Awards and records ==
- Rod Thorn, NBA All-Rookie Team 1st Team
- Gus Johnson, NBA All-Rookie Team 1st Team
