= 1963–64 St. Louis Hawks season =

NBA professional basketball team season

- Head coach: Harry Gallatin
- Arena: Kiel Auditorium

Results
- Record: 46–34 (.575)
- Place: Division: 2nd (Western)
- Playoff finish: West Division Finals (Eliminated 3–4)
- Stats at Basketball Reference

Local media
- Television: KPLR-TV
- Radio: KMOX

The 1963–64 St. Louis Hawks season was the Hawks' 15th season in the NBA and 9th season in Saint Louis.

== Regular season ==
=== Season standings ===
Western Division	W	L	PCT	GB	Home	Road	Neutral	Div
x-San Francisco Warriors	48	32	.600	–	25–14	21–15	2–3	29–17
x-St. Louis Hawks	46	34	.575	2	27–12	17–19	2–3	30–16
x-Los Angeles Lakers	42	38	.525	6	24–12	15–21	3–5	24–22
Baltimore Bullets	31	49	.388	17	20–19	8–21	3–9	16–24
Detroit Pistons	23	57	.288	25	9–21	6–25	8–11	13–33

x – clinched playoff spot

=== Game log ===
1963–64 Game log
#	Date	Opponent	Score	High points	Record
1	October 16	Cincinnati	112–93	Bob Pettit (39)	0–1
2	October 19	Los Angeles	108–117	Bob Pettit (32)	1–1
3	October 23	San Francisco	99–95	Bob Pettit (24)	1–2
4	October 26	Detroit	103–127	Zelmo Beaty (38)	2–2
5	October 27	@ Baltimore	123–112	Bob Pettit (31)	3–2
6	October 29	@ New York	109–103 (OT)	Bob Pettit (21)	4–2
7	October 30	New York	104–121	Cliff Hagan (28)	5–2
8	November 2	Philadelphia	99–128	Bob Pettit (31)	6–2
9	November 6	@ Baltimore	112–110	Bob Pettit (32)	7–2
10	November 8	@ Philadelphia	106–108	Bob Pettit (26)	7–3
11	November 9	Boston	113–91	Bob Pettit (22)	7–4
12	November 11	@ Boston	110–116	Bob Pettit (25)	7–5
13	November 13	@ New York	102–106	Cliff Hagan (24)	7–6
14	November 14	San Francisco	105–117	Cliff Hagan (38)	8–6
15	November 16	Baltimore	112–115	Bob Pettit (52)	9–6
16	November 17	@ Los Angeles	117–112	Bob Pettit (33)	10–6
17	November 19	@ San Francisco	96–129	Bob Pettit (24)	10–7
18	November 21	@ Los Angeles	99–111	Cliff Hagan (26)	10–8
19	November 23	Cincinnati	121–133	Bob Pettit (33)	11–8
20	November 24	@ Cincinnati	113–122	Bob Pettit (28)	11–9
21	November 27	@ Detroit	113–105	Zelmo Beaty (30)	12–9
22	November 28	Detroit	101–118	Bob Pettit (23)	13–9
23	November 30	Los Angeles	97–96	Bob Pettit (26)	13–10
24	December 4	San Francisco	83–105	Cliff Hagan (33)	14–10
25	December 5	@ Philadelphia	106–103	Bob Pettit (31)	15–10
26	December 6	@ Detroit	108–112 (OT)	Bob Pettit (24)	15–11
27	December 7	Philadelphia	120–129	Bob Pettit (36)	16–11
28	December 10	N Philadelphia	113–103	Bob Pettit (28)	17–11
29	December 11	@ Boston	95–104	Bob Pettit (27)	17–12
30	December 14	Detroit	92–104	Bob Pettit (30)	18–12
31	December 15	@ Los Angeles	102–95	Bob Pettit (26)	19–12
32	December 17	@ San Francisco	106–110	Bob Pettit (33)	19–13
33	December 18	@ San Francisco	96–104	Bob Pettit (29)	19–14
34	December 21	@ Detroit	100–91	Richie Guerin (22)	20–14
35	December 22	Baltimore	104–116	Bob Pettit (25)	21–14
36	December 25	@ Cincinnati	107–113	Cliff Hagan (33)	21–15
37	December 26	New York	111–107	Cliff Hagan (32)	21–16
38	December 28	Boston	107–100	Cliff Hagan (34)	21–17
39	December 31	@ Los Angeles	119–132	Bob Pettit (26)	21–18
40	January 2	@ San Francisco	111–106	Bob Pettit (28)	22–18
41	January 5	Detroit	99–116	Bob Pettit (31)	23–18
42	January 7	Baltimore	113–123	Bob Pettit (33)	24–18
43	January 9	@ Philadelphia	115–122	Bob Pettit (29)	24–19
44	January 11	@ Detroit	112–107	Bob Pettit (37)	25–19
45	January 12	Baltimore	117–113	Bob Pettit (46)	25–20
46	January 15	Los Angeles	111–109	Cliff Hagan (39)	25–21
47	January 18	@ Cincinnati	121–120	Lenny Wilkens (26)	26–21
48	January 19	Cincinnati	109–114	Bob Pettit (35)	27–21
49	January 21	Boston	114–116	Bob Pettit (29)	28–21
50	January 23	N Boston	104–110	Bob Pettit (35)	28–22
51	January 24	@ Boston	99–119	Bob Pettit (18)	28–23
52	January 25	@ Detroit	107–98	Bob Pettit (32)	29–23
53	January 25	Detroit	104–106	Bob Pettit (25)	30–23
54	January 29	New York	105–104	Zelmo Beaty (26)	30–24
55	February 1	Los Angeles	96–113	Bob Pettit (32)	31–24
56	February 2	Los Angeles	105–107	Guerin, Wilkens (22)	32–24
57	February 4	N Boston	101–113	Bob Pettit (27)	32–25
58	February 5	@ Baltimore	106–113	Bob Pettit (30)	32–26
59	February 8	San Francisco	103–97	Zelmo Beaty (22)	32–27
60	February 9	San Francisco	111–116	Bob Pettit (33)	33–27
61	February 11	New York	103–125	Cliff Hagan (25)	34–27
62	February 15	Philadelphia	110–118	Bob Pettit (27)	35–27
63	February 17	@ Baltimore	115–110	Richie Guerin (24)	36–27
64	February 19	N New York	114–120	Bob Pettit (37)	36–28
65	February 21	@ Baltimore	113–115 (2OT)	Bob Pettit (25)	36–29
66	February 22	Boston	88–95	Bob Pettit (19)	37–29
67	February 25	N Philadelphia	115–107	Bob Pettit (31)	38–29
68	February 27	San Francisco	107–97	Bob Pettit (24)	38–30
69	February 29	Los Angeles	114–115 (OT)	Bob Pettit (24)	39–30
70	March 1	@ Los Angeles	91–114	Cliff Hagan (25)	39–31
71	March 2	@ San Francisco	111–102	Bob Pettit (33)	40–31
72	March 4	@ Los Angeles	110–105	Richie Guerin (29)	41–31
73	March 5	@ San Francisco	104–102	Bob Pettit (21)	42–31
74	March 8	Baltimore	117–135	Bob Pettit (34)	43–31
75	March 10	@ New York	124–105	Cliff Hagan (34)	44–31
76	March 11	Philadelphia	124–111	Bob Pettit (25)	44–32
77	March 14	Cincinnati	110–118	Bob Pettit (38)	45–32
78	March 15	@ Cincinnati	101–124	Bob Pettit (23)	45–33
79	March 17	Detroit	99–115	Cliff Hagan (24)	46–33
80	March 18	@ Detroit	96–106	Bob Pettit (29)	46–34

== Playoffs ==
1964 playoff game log
Division Semifinals: 3–2 (home: 3–0; road: 0–2)

Game	Date	Team	Score	High points	High rebounds	High assists	Location Attendance	Series
1	March 21	Los Angeles	W 115–104	Cliff Hagan (27)	Bob Pettit (22)	Hagan, Wilkens (7)	Kiel Auditorium; 7,214	1–0
2	March 22	Los Angeles	W 106–90	Richie Guerin (22)	Bob Pettit (18)	Cliff Hagan (6)	Kiel Auditorium; 7,014	2–0
3	March 25	@ Los Angeles	L 105–107	Bob Pettit (23)	Bob Pettit (10)	Cliff Hagan (5)	Los Angeles Memorial Sports Arena; 11,728	2–1
4	March 28	@ Los Angeles	L 88–97	Bob Pettit (23)	Bob Pettit (12)	Lenny Wilkens (7)	Los Angeles Memorial Sports Arena; 13,862	2–2
5	March 30	Los Angeles	W 121–108	Lenny Wilkens (30)	Bob Pettit (20)	Hagan, Guerin (6)	Kiel Auditorium; 9,574	3–2

Division Finals: 3–4 (home: 2–1; road: 1–3)

Game	Date	Team	Score	High points	High rebounds	High assists	Location Attendance	Series
1	April 1	@ San Francisco	W 116–111	Richie Guerin (32)	Bill Bridges (12)	Richie Guerin (7)	Cow Palace; 5,231	1–0
2	April 3	@ San Francisco	L 85–120	Richie Guerin (23)	Bob Pettit (15)	Bridges, Wilkens (5)	Cow Palace; 9,063	1–1
3	April 5	San Francisco	W 113–109	Bob Pettit (26)	Bob Pettit (16)	Bridges, Wilkens (5)	Kiel Auditorium; 10,163	2–1
4	April 8	San Francisco	L 109–111	Bob Pettit (29)	Bob Pettit (15)	Lenny Wilkens (14)	Kiel Auditorium; 10,118	2–2
5	April 10	@ San Francisco	L 97–121	Bob Pettit (19)	Bob Pettit (11)	Bridges, Guerin, Hagan, Vaughn (3)	Cow Palace; 10,628	2–3
6	April 12	San Francisco	W 123–95	Bob Pettit (21)	Bob Pettit (13)	Cliff Hagan (9)	Kiel Auditorium; 8,967	3–3
7	April 16	@ San Francisco	L 95–105	Bob Pettit (24)	Bob Pettit (14)	Cliff Hagan (5)	Cow Palace; 8,923	3–4

1964 schedule

== Awards and records ==
- Bob Pettit: All-NBA First Team
