= 1963–64 NBA season =

18th NBA season

- League: National Basketball Association
- Sport: Basketball
- Duration: October 16, 1963 – March 18, 1964; March 21 – April 16, 1964 (Playoffs); April 18–26, 1964 (Finals)
- Games: 80
- Teams: 9
- TV partner: SNI

Draft
- Top draft pick: Art Heyman
- Picked by: New York Knicks

Regular season
- Top seed: Boston Celtics
- Season MVP: Oscar Robertson (Cincinnati)
- Top scorer: Wilt Chamberlain (San Francisco)

Playoffs
- Eastern champions: Boston Celtics
- Eastern runners-up: Cincinnati Royals
- Western champions: San Francisco Warriors
- Western runners-up: St. Louis Hawks

Finals
- Champions: Boston Celtics
- Runners-up: San Francisco Warriors

NBA seasons
- ← 1962–63 1964–65 →

The 1963–64 NBA season was the 18th season of the National Basketball Association. The season ended with the Boston Celtics winning their sixth straight NBA championship, beating the San Francisco Warriors 4 games to 1 in the NBA Finals.

== Notable occurrences ==
- The Syracuse Nationals move from Syracuse, New York to Philadelphia and become the Philadelphia 76ers. No major professional sports franchises have returned to Syracuse.
- The Chicago Zephyrs move from Chicago to Baltimore and become the new Baltimore Bullets, leaving Chicago with no NBA team until the birth of the Bulls in 1966.
- Similarly speaking, the moving of the Zephyrs to Baltimore would lead to a potential expansion team in Baltimore opting out of entering the league altogether this season after the NBA had previously agreed to have a new team entering the league in Baltimore this season from an agreement made during the previous season.
- The 1964 NBA All-Star Game was played at the Boston Garden in Boston, with the East beating the West 111–107. Oscar Robertson of the Cincinnati Royals won the game's MVP award.
- This would become the last season where Maurice Podoloff would be the president (later known as the commissioner) of the NBA. He would end up being replaced by J. Walter Kennedy by September 1, 1963.

Coaching changes
Offseason
Team	1962–63 coach	1963–64 coach
Cincinnati Royals	Charles Wolf	Jack McMahon
Detroit Pistons	Dick McGuire	Charles Wolf
San Francisco Warriors	Bob Feerick	Alex Hannum
Philadelphia 76ers	Alex Hannum	Dolph Schayes

== Season recap ==
The NBA continued to increase its interests this season, setting another attendance record and increasing its revenue from televised games. The growing interest in the league was certainly a direct result of the arrival of talented players from the college ranks. Players arriving in the league in recent seasons still rank among the greatest to ever play in the NBA decades later.

=== Leading teams ===
Two teams dominated much of the league's attention this year.

==== Celtics ====
The first were the Boston Celtics, which became what many considered to be the game's greatest dynasty. Retirement had claimed '50s superstar Bob Cousy, but Red Auerbach's club barely slowed down with his absence. Cousy's replacement was a defensive specialist named K.C. Jones, who continued Auerbach's emphasis on defense along with forward Tom 'Satch' Sanders and center Bill Russell. While Boston could still pass and score, it was their defensive emergence, led by Russell, that was now leading a streak of NBA titles. Russell led the league in rebounds and was one of two high-volume shot blockers now dominating the NBA. The Celtics had six scorers over ten-points per game and two more over eight. Auerbach's sixth man, John Havlicek, was the team's leading scorer at 20 per game. This combination of active defense and team chemistry got Boston a league-high 59 wins in 80 NBA games.

==== Royals ====
The Cincinnati Royals were coached by Jack McMahon, who had played for the team when it was based in Rochester. Jerry Lucas joined the Royals from the defunct ABL, playing alongside Oscar Robertson, Jack Twyman and Wayne Embry. Lucas led the NBA in field goal percentage at 53% and ranked third in rebounds. He was named Rookie of the Year, becoming the fourth consecutive recipient to have played on the 1960 U.S. Olympic basketball team. Five members of that Olympic team were on the Royals’ roster at some point during the season.

While Lucas's arrival somewhat overshadowed Oscar Robertson's brilliance, he still delivered an MVP-caliber season. He made 840 field goals, second in the league, and boasted an 85% free throw percentage, leading the NBA with 800 made free throws. Robertson averaged 11 assists per game, and his fast-paced style of play created numerous rebounding opportunities. Robertson, who is typically argued as one of the greatest rebounding guards of all time, averaged 9 rebounds per game. Robertson averaged 31.4 points per game, leading the Royals to 55 wins with a well-balanced roster, keeping pace with the Boston Celtics throughout the season.

==== Warriors ====
After these 50-game winners in the East Division, there were also three 40-game winners in the West Division of the NBA this year.

The San Francisco Warriors, in their second season in California, won the West with 48 wins in 80 NBA games. Their leader was again superstar Wilt Chamberlain. Wilt tried 2298 shots in his 80 games, easily a league high, and made a league-high 1204 field goals at a 52% clip. A poor foul shooter, Wilt still had a league-high 1016 tries to help boost his 36.9 scoring average, which again led all NBA players. Wilt was second in rebounds, first or second in shots blocked, and first in minutes played with an average of 46 minutes per 48-minute NBA game. Expanding his game to include passing, Wilt edged past Russell to finish sixth in the NBA assists column as well. The Warriors had five other ten-point scorers and a potential future star in rookie Nate Thurmond under coach Alex Hannum.

==== Hawks ====
Second in the West were the St. Louis Hawks, led by Bob Pettit. The 31-year-old star was fourth in the NBA in scoring and fifth in rebounds. His 608 free throws made were second-most in the league also. Coach Harry Gallatin's starting five had balanced support for Pettit, and a number of former ABL stars on the bench, including Bill Bridges.

==== Lakers ====
The Los Angeles Lakers went 42–38 in their fourth year in California. They were led by the All-Star tandem of Jerry West and Elgin Baylor. West scored 28.7 points and six assists per game while Baylor averaged 25.4 points and twelve rebounds per game. Fred Schaus's starting five, including Rudy LaRusso and Dick Barnett, supported the two stars along with contributions from bench players. Lack of consistent center play continued to be the team's Achilles heel, with forward Baylor sometimes playing out of position.

=== Bullets ===
The Baltimore Bullets played their first NBA season in the West Division, making the former Chicago club a curiosity. The impact of this is that the Cincinnati Royals would have to beat Boston to make the NBA Finals, their second-best league record notwithstanding. San Francisco, with the league's third-best mark, would have the clear shot from the West instead.

=== Postseason ===
Three teams in each division made the playoffs, with the second and third place teams meeting in the first round. The division winner then met that winner in the second round to produce NBA Finalists. Only three NBA teams out of nine failed to make those playoffs. Cincinnati edged the 34–46 Philadelphia 76ers three games to two in a surprisingly close series where each team won their home games. Cincinnati, luckily, had three of them. The St. Louis Hawks beat the Lakers 3–2 along the same lines. A rested Boston club sent the Royals a clear message in the East Final in winning four of five games. Coach Jack McMahon had been roundly criticized for trading reserve forward Bob Boozer at mid-season. Boozer had become a reserve with the arrival of Lucas. Now a starter for lowly New York Knicks, the Royals clearly missed their former teammate at playoff time when bench depth is a key consideration. San Francisco dismissed the Hawks four games to three. A knee injury to St. Louis center Zelmo Beaty limited his effectiveness.

==== Finals ====
A classic Russell vs. Wilt matchup marked the NBA Finals. Chamberlain tried and made the most shots, tried the most free throws, pulled down the most rebounds, and perhaps blocked the most shots of any player in the playoffs by a clear margin. But he and his supporting cast were no match for Boston, who got strong performances from Sam Jones and John Havlicek, while Russell nearly matched rebounds and blocks with Wilt in the middle. The series only went five games, with Boston clearly the winner in four of them. Boston had won eight of ten games decisively against the league's next two best records to clearly prove they were in their own class as basketball's best team. They broke the record for most consecutive championships won by a single team in all four of the major North American professional sports leagues, besting the New York Yankees, who had won five straight World Series from 1949 to 1953, and the Montreal Canadiens, who won five straight Stanley Cups between 1956 and 1960.

== Final standings ==
=== Eastern Division ===
Eastern Division	W	L	PCT	GB	Home	Road	Neutral	Div
x-Boston Celtics	59	21	.738	–	26–4	21–17	12–0	25–11
x-Cincinnati Royals	55	25	.688	4	26–7	18–18	11–0	27–9
x-Philadelphia 76ers	34	46	.425	25	18–12	12–22	4–12	13–23
New York Knicks	22	58	.275	37	10–25	8–27	4–6	7–29

=== Western Division ===
Western Division	W	L	PCT	GB	Home	Road	Neutral	Div
x-San Francisco Warriors	48	32	.600	–	25–14	21–15	2–3	29–17
x-St. Louis Hawks	46	34	.575	2	27–12	17–19	2–3	30–16
x-Los Angeles Lakers	42	38	.525	6	24–12	15–21	3–5	24–22
Baltimore Bullets	31	49	.388	17	20–19	8–21	3–9	16–24
Detroit Pistons	23	57	.288	25	9–21	6–25	8–11	13–33

x – clinched playoff spot

== Playoff bracket ==
Division Semifinals
E3	Philadelphia	2
E2	Cincinnati	3
W3	Los Angeles	2
W2	St. Louis	3

Division Finals
Eastern Division
E1	Boston*	4
E2	Cincinnati	1
Western Division
W1	San Francisco*	4
W2	St. Louis	3

NBA Finals
E1	Boston*	4
W1	San Francisco*	1

- * Division winner
- Bold Series winner
- Italic Team with home-court advantage in NBA Finals

== Statistics leaders ==
Category	Player	Team	Stat
Points	Wilt Chamberlain	San Francisco Warriors	2,948
Rebounds	Bill Russell	Boston Celtics	1,930
Assists	Oscar Robertson	Cincinnati Royals	868
FG%	Jerry Lucas	Cincinnati Royals	.527
FT%	Oscar Robertson	Cincinnati Royals	.853

Note: Prior to the 1969–70 season, league leaders in points, rebounds, and assists were determined by totals rather than averages.

== NBA awards ==
- Most Valuable Player: Oscar Robertson, Cincinnati Royals
- Rookie of the Year: Jerry Lucas, Cincinnati Royals
- Coach of the Year: Alex Hannum, San Francisco Warriors
- All-NBA First Team:
  - F – Bob Pettit, St. Louis Hawks
  - F – Elgin Baylor, Los Angeles Lakers
  - C – Wilt Chamberlain, San Francisco Warriors
  - G – Jerry West, Los Angeles Lakers
  - G – Oscar Robertson, Cincinnati Royals
- All-NBA Second Team:
  - G – Hal Greer, Philadelphia 76ers
  - G – John Havlicek, Boston Celtics
  - F – Tom Heinsohn, Boston Celtics
  - F – Jerry Lucas, Cincinnati Royals
  - C – Bill Russell, Boston Celtics
- NBA All-Rookie First Team:
  - Art Heyman, New York Knicks
  - Gus Johnson, Baltimore Bullets
  - Jerry Lucas, Cincinnati Royals
  - Rod Thorn, Baltimore Bullets
  - Nate Thurmond, San Francisco Warriors

== See also ==
- List of NBA regular season records
