= List of career achievements by Wilt Chamberlain =

This article concerns the career achievements of Wilt Chamberlain, a Naismith Memorial Basketball Hall of Famer who holds numerous NBA records in scoring, rebounding and durability. Among others, he is the only player in NBA history to average 40 and 50 points in a season, score 100 points in a single game, and record over 2,000 rebounds in a single season. He also won seven scoring, nine field goal percentage, and 11 rebounding titles, in addition to an assist title. With an assortment of fadeaway and jump shots, his favorite one-hand finger-roll and powerful dunks in the low post, he scored 31,419 points, grabbed 23,924 rebounds, averaging 30.07 points (second-best all time behind Michael Jordan) and 22.9 rebounds (all-time leader) and was also very durable, standing on the hardwood an average 45.8 minutes.

For his feats, Chamberlain was inducted into the Naismith Memorial Basketball Hall of Fame in 1978, elected into the NBA 35th Anniversary Team in 1980, chosen as one of the 50 Greatest Players in NBA History in 1996, and named to the NBA 75th Anniversary Team in 2021. He was ranked No. 13 in ESPN's list "Top North American Athletes of the Century" in 1999, and No. 2 in Slam's top 500 NBA players of all time in 2011, In honor of Chamberlain, his jerseys have been retired six times, by Overbrook High School, the University of Kansas, the Harlem Globetrotters, and the Warriors, 76ers, and Lakers franchises.

== List of records and feats ==
Chamberlain holds 72 NBA records, 68 by himself. Among his records are several that are considered unbreakable, such as averaging 22.9 rebounds for a career or 50.4 points per game in a season, scoring 100 points or 55 rebounds in a single game, scoring 65 or more points 15 times, 50 or more points 118 times. During Chamberlain's time, defensive statistics like blocks and steals had not been recorded yet. According to Jack Ramsay, "Harvey [Pollack] said he used to tell one of his statisticians to keep track of Wilt's blocks in big games. ... One night, they got up to 25." (The first season blocked shots were officially recorded in the NBA was 1973/74, the season after Chamberlain retired as a player. The official NBA record of 17 blocks in a single game was set by Elmore Smith in 1973.)

=== NBA scoring records ===
- NBA record – Most points per game in a season (50.4 in the 1961–62 season)

- Also holds the next three spots with 44.8 in 1962–63, 38.4 in 1960–61 and 37.6 in 1959–60.

- NBA record – Most points in a season (4,029 in 1961–62)

- Also holds the second-highest record with 3,586 in 1962–63.

- NBA record – Most points scored in a game (100 vs. the New York Knicks on March 2, 1962)

- Bam Adebayo second with 83, Kobe Bryant 3rd with 81.

- NBA record – Most points scored in a half (59 in the 2nd half vs. the New York Knicks on March 2, 1962)

- Kobe Bryant is second with 55.

- NBA record – Most 50-point games in a season (45 in 1961–62)

- Chamberlain holds the next most with 30 in 1962–63. No other player has had more than 10.

- NBA record – Most 40-point games in a season (63 in 1961–62)

- Chamberlain holds the second-most with 52 in 1962–63. Michael Jordan is third with 37 in 1986–87.

- NBA record – Most consecutive seasons leading league in points per game (7)

- Record shared with Michael Jordan.

- NBA record – Most career regular-season 60-point games (32)

- Kobe Bryant is second with 6.

- NBA record – Most career regular-season 50-point games (118)

- Michael Jordan is second with 31.

- NBA record – Most career regular-season 40-point games (271)

- Michael Jordan is second with 173.

- NBA record – Most career regular-season 35-point games (381)

- Michael Jordan is second with 333.

- NBA record – Most consecutive 60-point games (4 from February 25-March 2, 1962)

- Chamberlain also holds the next three longest streaks with 3 in January 1962, 2 in December 1961 and 2 in December 1962.
- Chamberlain is the only player to ever score 60 points in back-to-back games.

- NBA record – Most consecutive 50-point games (7 from December 16–29, 1961)

- Chamberlain also holds the next three longest streaks with 6 in 1962, and 5 in 1961 and 1962.

- NBA record – Most consecutive 40-point games (14 from December 8–30, 1961 and January 11 – February 1, 1962)

- Chamberlain also has the next most with 10 from November 9–25, 1962.

- NBA record – Most consecutive 30-point games (65 from November 4, 1961 – February 22, 1962)

- James Harden is second with 32 in 2018-19 season. Chamberlain also is third with 31 in 1962

- NBA record – Most consecutive games leading all players in scoring (40 in 1961–62 season)

- Bob McAdoo is second with 28.

- NBA record – Most consecutive games leading all teammates in scoring (116)
- NBA record – Most points per game by a rookie (37.6 in 1959–60)
- NBA record – Most points by a rookie (2,707 in 1959–60)
- NBA record – Most points by a rookie in a game (58 on January 25, 1960, and February 21, 1960)

- Rick Barry is second with 57.

- NBA record – Most consecutive 40-point games by a rookie (5 in late January 1960)

- Shared with Allen Iverson

- NBA record – Most points scored by a player in his first NBA game (43 on October 24, 1959, against the New York Knicks)

- Frank Selvy is second with 35.

- NBA record – Fewest games played to reach 15,000 points (358, achieved in 1964)

- Michael Jordan, at 460 games, took the second-fewest games.

- NBA record – Fewest games played to reach 20,000 points (499, achieved in 1966)

- Michael Jordan, at 620 games, took the second-fewest games.

- NBA record – Fewest games played to reach 25,000 points (691, achieved on February 23, 1968, against the Detroit Pistons)

- Michael Jordan, at 782 games, took the second-fewest games.

- NBA record – Fewest games played to reach 30,000 points (941, achieved on February 16, 1972, against the Phoenix Suns)

- Michael Jordan, at 960 games, took the second-fewest games.

- NBA record – Most consecutive seasons leading the league in field goals made (7 from 1959–60 through 1965–66)

- Shared with Michael Jordan

- NBA record – Most field goals made in a season (1,597 in 1961–62)

- Chamberlain holds the next 3 spots with 1,463 in 1962–63, 1,251 in 1960–61, and 1,204 in 1963–64

- NBA record – Most field goals attempted in a season (3,159 in 1961–62)

- Chamberlain holds the next four highest with 2,770, 2,457, 2,311, and 2,298.

- NBA record – Most field goals made in a game (36 vs. the New York Knicks on March 2, 1962)

- Chamberlain holds the next highest with 31, and is tied with Rick Barry at third with 30

- NBA record – Most field goals attempted in a game (63 vs. the New York Knicks on March 2, 1962)

- Chamberlain holds the next two most with 62 and 60.

- NBA record – Most field goals Made in a Half (22 in the 2nd half vs. the New York Knicks on March 2, 1962)

- Rick Barry is second with 21.

- NBA record – Most field goals Attempted in a Half (37 vs. the New York Knicks on March 2, 1962 (2nd half)

- George Gervin is second with 34.

- NBA record – Most field goals Attempted in a Quarter (21 in the 4th quarter vs. the New York Knicks on March 2, 1962)
- NBA record – Most seasons leading the NBA in free throw attempts (9)
- NBA record – Most consecutive seasons leading the NBA in free throw attempts (6 from 1959–60 through 1964–65)
- NBA record – Most free throws Attempted in a season (1,363 in 1961–62)

- Chamberlain also holds the next four spots with 1,113, 1,054, 1,016, and 991.

- NBA playoff record – Most points by a rookie in a game (53 vs. the Syracuse Nationals on March 14, 1960)

- Pulled down a rookie playoff record 35 rebounds in the same game.
- Chamberlain also scored 50 as a rookie against the Boston Celtics on March 22, 1960.

- NBA playoff record – Most field goals in a seven-game series (113 vs. the St. Louis Hawks in 1964)
- NBA playoff record – Most field goals in a game (24 vs. the Syracuse Nationals on March 14, 1960)

- Record shared with John Havlicek and Michael Jordan

- NBA playoff record – Most field goal attempts in a game (48 vs. the Syracuse Nationals on March 22, 1962)

- Record shared with Rick Barry

- NBA playoff record – Most field goal attempts in a three-game series (104 vs. the Syracuse Nationals in 1960)
- NBA playoff record – Most field goal attempts in a five-game series (159 vs. the Syracuse Nationals in 1962)
- NBA All-Star Game record – Free throw attempts in a game (16 in 1962)

- Chamberlain also holds the second-most attempts in an All-Star Game with 15 in 1960.

==== Other selected scoring facts ====
- 2nd-highest career scoring average (30.07) – record held by Michael Jordan

- Jordan scored 581 three-point field goals, which didn't exist during Chamberlain's time. If his three-pointers were turned into two-pointers, his career scoring average would be of 29.58.

- 3rd-most career regular-season 30-point games (515) – record held by LeBron James
- 2nd-most consecutive 20-point games (126) – record held by Shai Gilgeous-Alexander

- During the streak, Shai missed a total 18 games. Wilt hasn't missed a single game during his.
- Chamberlain also holds the 3rd-most with 92.

- 2nd-most free throws made in a season (835 in 1961–62) – record held by Jerry West
- 2nd-most Free Throws Made in a Game (28 vs. the New York Knicks on March 2, 1962) – record held by Bam Adebayo

- A feat shared with Adrian Dantley

- 3rd-most free throws attempted in a game (34 vs. the St. Louis Hawks on February 22, 1962) – record held by Adebayo

- Chamberlain also holds fourth place with 32 on March 2, 1962

- 2nd-fewest games played to reach 31,000 points (1,115, achieved on February 1, 1973, against the Phoenix Suns) – record held by Michael Jordan, at 1,111 games.
- 4th-most points in an NBA All-Star Game (42 in 1962) – record held by Jayson Tatum (55 in 2023)
  - 2nd Most points held by Anthony Davis (52 in 2017)
  - 3rd Most points held by Stephen Curry (50 in 2022)
- 2nd-most Playoff games with at least 50 points: 4 – record held by Michael Jordan (8);

- All of Chamberlain's performances came in regulation time; two of Jordan's 50-point games came in overtime. Both of them scored a maximum 56 points in 48-minute playoff games;
- All of Chamberlain's performances resulted in team wins; two of Jordan's 50-point games ended in a loss;
- Chamberlain is the only player to score at least 50 points in two different Conference/Division Finals games;
- Chamberlain is the only player to score at least 50 points in an elimination game (a feat he accomplished three times).

- 2nd-most playoff games with at least 45 points: 8 – record held by Michael Jordan;
- 3rd most points in a Playoff game: 56—record held by Michael Jordan;

- When considered only Playoff regulation games, this is the 2nd highest scoring performance, and the record belongs to Elgin Baylor, with 61 in 1962.

- 3rd-most points in an NBA All-Star Game half (23 in 1962) – record held by Anthony Davis; 2nd place held by Glen Rice; 3rd place shared with Tom Chambers
- 3rd-most field goals made in an NBA All-Star Game (17 in 1962) – record held by Anthony Davis; 2nd place held by Blake Griffin; 3rd place shared with Kevin Garnett and Michael Jordan

=== NBA rebounding records ===
- NBA record – Career total rebounds (23,924)
- NBA record – Career rebounds per game (22.9)
- NBA record – Most seasons leading the league in rebounds (11)
- NBA record – Most seasons with 1,000 or more rebounds (13)
- NBA record – Rebounds per game in a season (27.2)

- Chamberlain also holds the next two highest averages with 27.0 in 1959–60 and 25.7 in 1961–62)
- Chamberlain and Bill Russell occupy the top 18 spots on this list (9 each).

- NBA record – Total Rebounds in a season (2,149 in 1960–1961)

- Chamberlain also holds the next six highest totals.

- NBA record – Rebounds in a game (55, Philadelphia Warriors vs. Boston Celtics, November 24, 1960)

- Besides Bill Russell (11 times, including 3 playoff games, max of 51) only Nate Thurmond (42) and Jerry Lucas (40) have ever gotten at least 40.

- NBA record – Most rebounds per game by a rookie in a season (27.0)
- NBA record – Most rebounds by a rookie in a season (1,941)
- NBA record – Most rebounds by a rookie in a game (45 on February 6, 1960)

- Chamberlain, as a rookie, also grabbed 43 rebounds in one game, 42 in two others, and 40 in another.

- NBA playoff record – Most rebounds in a single postseason (444 during the 1969 Playoffs).

- Chamberlain also has the second-most, with 437 in 1967 Playoffs.

- NBA playoff record – Most rebounds in a playoff game (41 against the Boston Celtics, on April 5, 1967).

- Game 3 victory in the Eastern Division finals.

- NBA playoff record – Most rebounds in a half (26 against the San Francisco Warriors on April 16, 1967)

- Also an NBA Finals record.

- NBA playoff record – Highest rebounding average in a playoff series (32.0 in a 5-game series against the Boston Celtics in 1967).
- NBA playoff record – Highest rebounding per game in a single NBA playoff season, (30.2 per game in 1965-
- NBA playoff record – Most rebounds in a 5-game playoff series (160 against the Boston Celtics in 1967).
- NBA playoff record – Most rebounds in a 6-game playoff series (171 against the San Francisco Warriors in 1967).

- Also an NBA Finals record for a 6-game series.

- NBA playoff record – Most rebounds in a 7-game playoff series (220 against the Boston Celtics in 1965).
- NBA playoff record – Most rebounds by a rookie in a game (35 against the Boston Celtics on March 22, 1960)

- Scored a then-playoff record 53 points (still a rookie record) in the same game (a game 5 victory).

- NBA Finals record – Highest rebounds per game average, career (24.6)
- NBA All-Star Game record – Most career rebounds in the NBA All-Star game (197).
- NBA All-Star Game record – Most rebounds in a half (16 in 1960).

- Record shared with Bob Pettit

==== Other selected rebound facts ====
- 2nd-highest playoff career average (24.5) – record held by Bill Russell
- 2nd-most consecutive seasons with 1,000+ rebounds (10) – record held by Bill Russell
- 2nd-most rebounds in a half (31 vs. the Boston Celtics on November 24, 1960) – record held by Bill Russell
- 2nd-most rebounds in a quarter (17 vs. the Syracuse Nationals on February 5, 1960) – record held by Nate Thurmond, 2nd place is shared with three performances by Bill Russell
- 2nd-most rebounds in a 3-game NBA Playoff series (69 vs. the Syracuse Nationals in 1961) – record held by Bill Russell
- 2nd-most rebounds in a 4-game NBA Playoff series (106 vs. the Cincinnati Royals in 1967) – record held by Bill Russell
- 2nd-most consecutive games 20+ rebounds in the NBA Finals (12 over a series of games in the 1964, 1967, and 1969 finals) – record held by Bill Russell
- 2nd-most consecutive games 30+ rebounds in the NBA Finals (2 in 1967 finals, 2 in 1969 finals) – record held by Bill Russell; 2nd place is also shared by Bill Russell
- 2nd-most rebounds in a 5-game NBA Finals (vs. Boston Celtics in 1967) – record held by Bill Russell
- 2nd-most rebounds in a 7-game NBA Finals (vs. Boston Celtics in 1969) – record held by Bill Russell
- 2nd-highest rebounding average in the NBA All-Star Game (15.2) – record held by Bob Pettit
- 3rd-highest rebounding average in an NBA Finals series (28.5 in 1967) – first two spots held by Bill Russell
- Chamberlain never grabbed fewer than 10 rebounds in any of playoff games he logged
- Chamberlain never averaged fewer than 18 rebounds in a season

Distinction also held by Bill Russell

- Chamberlain never averaged fewer than 20 rebounds in a postseason

Distinction also held by Bill Russell

- Chamberlain is the only player to grab more than 2,000 rebounds in a single season: 2,149 rebounds in the 1960–61 season and 2,052 in 1961–62.

- Chamberlain's 1961–62 season stat line: 4,029 points (50.4 ppg) and 2,052 rebounds (25.7 rpg).

=== NBA versatility records ===
- NBA record – Most double-doubles, all time: 968.
- NBA record – Most consecutive double-doubles (227) (between 1964 and 1967 seasons)
  - Chamberlain also holds the 2nd- and 3rd-longest streaks (220 and 133).
- NBA playoff record – Most consecutive triple-doubles in the same postseason (4) (April 9–16, 1967)
  - Tied by Nikola Jokić (May 9–18, 2023)

==== Other selected versatility facts ====
- NBA record – 2nd highest single-season PER: 31.82 in 1963 season. (First is Giannis Antetokounmpo with 31.86. Although Nikola Jokić and Antetokounmpo are both Numbers 1 and 2, the season is not yet over.)

- Chamberlain also holds the third spot: 31.74 in 1962 season.

- Only player in NBA history to lead the league in points and rebounds the same season (a feat he accomplished six times)
- One of only three players in NBA history to lead the league in points and field goal percentage the same season (a feat he accomplished four times)
- One of only two players in NBA history to lead the league in rebounds and assists the same season (a feat he accomplished during the '67-68 season)
- Only player in NBA history to lead the league in points, assists, and rebounds in any season
- Only player in NBA history to lead the postseason in points, rebounds, assists and field percentage in any postseason
- One of two players to lead the league in rebounds and assists in the same postseason (a feat he accomplished during the '66-67 Playoffs)
- One of only three players in NBA history to record a double-triple-double (20+ in three different categories)

- On February 2, 1968, against the Detroit Pistons, he logged 22 points, 25 rebounds, and 21 assists.

- Only player in NBA history to record a double-quadruple (40+ in two different categories) (a feat he performed 8 times).

- On November 4, 1959, Chamberlain, in his third game in the NBA, scored 41 points and grabbed a then-rookie record 40 rebounds against the Syracuse Nationals.
- On January 15, 1960, Chamberlain, as a rookie, scored 44 points and grabbed 43 rebounds against the Boston Celtics.
- On January 25, 1960, Chamberlain, as a rookie, scored an NBA rookie record 58 points and grabbed 42 rebounds against the Detroit Pistons.
- On February 6, 1960, Chamberlain, as a rookie, scored 44 points and grabbed an NBA rookie record 45 rebounds against the Syracuse Nationals.
- On January 21, 1961, Chamberlain scored 56 points and grabbed 45 rebounds against the Los Angeles Lakers.
- On December 8, 1961, Chamberlain scored a then-record 78 points and collected 43 rebounds against the Los Angeles Lakers.
- On October 26, 1962, Chamberlain scored 50 points and grabbed 41 rebounds against the Detroit Pistons.
- On November 22, 1964, Chamberlain scored 50 points and grabbed 40 rebounds against the Detroit Pistons.

- Chamberlain led the league in total assists 1967–68, with 702 assists (he did not lead the league in assists per game): he remains only one of two centers to lead the league in assists.
- Most 30-30 games (at least 30 points and rebounds) in the history of NBA: 124;

- All the other NBA players combine to 32 games.

- 2nd-most games leading both teams in points, rebounds and assists: 33 (record held by Russell Westbrook, 2nd place is shared with LeBron James)
- Only player in NBA history to average at least 23 points, 14 rebounds, and 6 assists in the same season. Chamberlain did it in 1966–67 and 1967–68
- Only player in NBA history to average at least 20 points and 20 rebounds in a 7-game Finals series (23.3 points and 24.1 rebounds, performed during the 1970 NBA Finals)

- Chamberlain also had a field goal percentage of 62.5% (70/112) during that series.

- 3rd-most double-doubles in the Playoffs: 143

- The first is Tim Duncan, with 158, and the second is Magic Johnson, with 157.

- 7th-most triple-doubles, career: 78

- Chamberlain is one of only two centers among the first 17 names, the other being Nikola Jokić.

- Fifth most points scored in regulation in a triple-double game (53 points, along with 32 rebounds and 14 assists) (March 18, 1968). James Harden scored 60 in a triple-double with 11 assists and 10 rebounds January 30, 2018. Russell Westbrook scored 57 in a triple-double with 11 assists and 13 rebounds March 29, 2017.
- Second most consecutive triple-doubles (9) (March 8–20, 1968). Russell Westbrook has the most consecutive triple-doubles with 11.
- Second most double-doubles at the All-Star Game - (7)

=== NBA durability records ===
- NBA record – Most seasons leading NBA in minutes played (8)
- NBA record – Most consecutive seasons leading NBA in minutes played (5, from 1959–60 through 1963–64)
- NBA record – Most career minutes played per game (45.8)

- Bill Russell is second at 42.3

- NBA record – Most minutes played in a season (3,882 in 1961–62)

- Chamberlain also holds the next four most with 3,836 in 1967–68, 3,806 in 1962–63, 3,773 in 1960–61, and 3,737 in 1965–66

- NBA record – Most minutes played per game for a season (48.53 in 1961–62)

- Chamberlain holds the top 7 spots in this category
- Chamberlain's 3,882 minutes played out of the team's possible 3,890 left an average of six seconds of rest per game.
- A regulation NBA basketball game is 48 minutes long.

- NBA record – Most complete games in a season (79 out of 80 games in 1961–62)
- NBA record – Most consecutive complete games in a season (47 in 1961–62)
- NBA playoff record – Highest postseason career average minutes per game: 47.24
- NBA playoff record – Highest average minutes per game in a playoff series (49.33 (296/6) against the New York Knicks in 1968)
- NBA playoff record – Most minutes played in a three-game series (144 against the Syracuse Nationals in 1961)
- NBA playoff record – Most minutes played in a four-game series (195 against the Cincinnati Royals in 1965 and the Atlanta Hawks in 1970)

- Record shared with Jerry Lucas and Oscar Robertson.

- NBA playoff record – Most minutes played in a six-game series (296 against the New York Knicks in 1968)
- NBA Finals record – Most minutes played in a five-game series (240 against the New York Knicks in 1973)
- Chamberlain never fouled out of a regular-season or playoff game in his 14 years in the NBA. His career average was only 2 fouls per game, despite having averaged 45.8 minutes per game over his career. His fouls per 36 minutes (a statistic used to compare players that average vastly different minutes) was a remarkable 1.6 per game.

==== Other selected durability facts ====
- 3rd-most minutes played in the NBA All-Star Game: 388;

- record held by LeBron James (522)

- 3rd-oldest player to win Finals MVP award: 35 years, 8 months, 14 days old in 1972;

- the oldest is Kareem Abdul-Jabbar (38 years, 1 month, 23 days old in 1985) and the Second is LeBron James (35 years, 9 months, 11 days old in 2020)

- 2nd-oldest player to lead the league in rebounds: 36 years, 8 months in 1973;

- the oldest is Dennis Rodman (37 years old in 1998)

- 2nd-oldest player in NBA history to score at least 60 points in a game: 32 years, 126 days (66 points vs. Phoenix Suns on Feb 9, 1969)

- the oldest is Kobe Bryant (scored 60 points at age 37 years, 7 months and 20 days)
- Chamberlain remains the oldest player to score more than 60 points in a game.
- Chamberlain is also the third- and fourth-oldest player to score at least 60 points in a game.

=== NBA accuracy records ===
- NBA record – Most consecutive seasons leading NBA in field goal percentage (5, from 1964–65 through 1968–69)

- Tied with Shaquille O'Neal.

- NBA record – Most consecutive field goals (35 from February 17–28, 1967)
- NBA record – Most field goals in a game without a miss (18, Philadelphia 76ers vs. the Baltimore Bullets on February 24, 1967)

- Chamberlain also holds the next three most with 16 (March 19, 1967), 15 (January 20, 1967) and 14 (March 11, 1969)

- NBA record – Career free throws missed (5805)
- NBA record – Career free throws missed per game (5.6)
- NBA record – Free throws missed per game in a season (7.0 in 1967–68)

- Chamberlain also holds the next three highest averages.

- NBA record – most free-throws missed in a single season (578 in the 1967–68 season)

- Chamberlain also holds the next six highest totals.

- NBA playoff record – Most free throws missed in a half (12, vs. Boston Celtics, April 12, 1966)

==== Other selected accuracy facts ====
- 2nd-most seasons leading NBA in field goal percentage (9) – record held by Shaquille O'Neal (10)
- One of only four players to lead NBA Playoffs in field goal percentage for more than one season (in 1964 and 1969)

- shared with DeAndre Jordan, Alonzo Mourning, and Alex Groza.

- 2nd-most free throws missed in a game (22, vs. Seattle SuperSonics, December 1, 1967) – record held by Andre Drummond (23)
- 2nd-most free throws attempted in a game with none made (10 vs. the Detroit Pistons on 11/04/1960) – record held by Shaquille O'Neal (11) (12/08/2000)
- 3rd-most free throws missed in a playoff game (17, vs. Boston Celtics, April 12, 1966) – record held by Shaquille O'Neal (21); 2nd place held by DeAndre Jordan (20)
- 3rd-lowest career free-throw percentage in NBA history (minimum 1,200 attempts) – record held by Ben Wallace

== Accolades ==
In addition to his many statistical accomplishments, Chamberlain also had a successful career. He is a two-time NBA Champion (1967, 1972) and a six-time NBA Finalist (1964, 1967, 1969–70, 1972–73), was voted NBA MVP 4 times (1959–60, 1965–66, 1966–67, 1967–68) and NBA Finals MVP once (1972), was elected to 7 All-NBA First Teams (1960–62, 1964, 1966–68), 3 All-NBA Second Teams (1963, 1965, 1972) and also made two All-Defensive First Teams (1972, 1973). Along with Wes Unseld, he is one of two players to have won the Rookie of the Year and the MVP awards in the same year, being the only one to add NBA All-Star Game MVP to this list.

NBA

- 2× NBA champion (1967, 1972)
- NBA Finals MVP (1972)
- 4× NBA Most Valuable Player (1960, 1966–1968)
- 13× NBA All-Star (1960–1969, 1971–1973)
- NBA All-Star Game MVP (1960)
- 7× All-NBA First Team (1960–1962, 1964, 1966–1968)
- 3× All-NBA Second Team (1963, 1965, 1972)
- 2× NBA All-Defensive First Team (1972, 1973)
- NBA Rookie of the Year (1960)
- 7× NBA scoring champion (1960–1966)
- 11× NBA rebounding champion (1960–1963, 1966–1969, 1971–1973)
- NBA assist leader (1968)
- 9× NBA minutes leaders 1960, 1961, 1962, 1963, 1964, 1966, 1967, 1968, 1969
- 9× NBA field goal percentage leaders 1961, 1963, 1965, 1966, 1967, 1968, 1969, 1972, 1973
- NBA free throw scoring leaders 1961–62
- NBA anniversary team (35th, 50th, 75th)
- No. 13 retired by Harlem Globetrotters
- No. 13 retired by Golden State Warriors
- No. 13 retired by Philadelphia 76ers
- No. 13 retired by Los Angeles Lakers
- Inducted into the Naismith Memorial Basketball Hall of Fame (1978)
- The NBA Rookie of the Year award was named The Wilt Chamberlain Trophy (2022)

Media

- Philadelphia Sports Writers Association Athlete of the Year (1967)
- 3× ESPN American Athlete of the Year (1960, 1967, 1968)
- 5× Sam Davis Memorial Award (1960, 1962, 1966–1968)
- 4× Sporting News NBA MVP (1960, 1966–1968)
- 3× USBWA NBA MVP (1960, 1964, 1966)
- Sporting News Rookie of the Year (1960)
- Hy Turkin Memorial Award (1960)

NCAA

- NCAA Tournament Most Outstanding Player (1957)
- 2× Consensus first-team All-American (1957, 1958)
  - 2× AP first-team All-American (1957, 1958)
  - 2× USBWA first-team All-American (1957, 1958)
  - 2× NABC first-team All-American (1957, 1958)
  - 2× UPI first-team All-American (1957, 1958)
  - 2× NEA first-team All-American (1957, 1958)
  - 2× INS first-team All-American (1957, 1958)
- 2× First-team All-Big 8 (1957, 1958)
- 2× Big 8 scoring leader (1957, 1958)
- 2× Big 8 rebounding leader (1957, 1958)
- No. 13 jersey retired by Kansas Jayhawks
- National Collegiate Basketball Hall of Fame – Inaugural Class of 2006

High school

- Mr. Basketball USA (1955)
