= Wilt Chamberlain's 100-point game =

1962 NBA record-setting basketball game

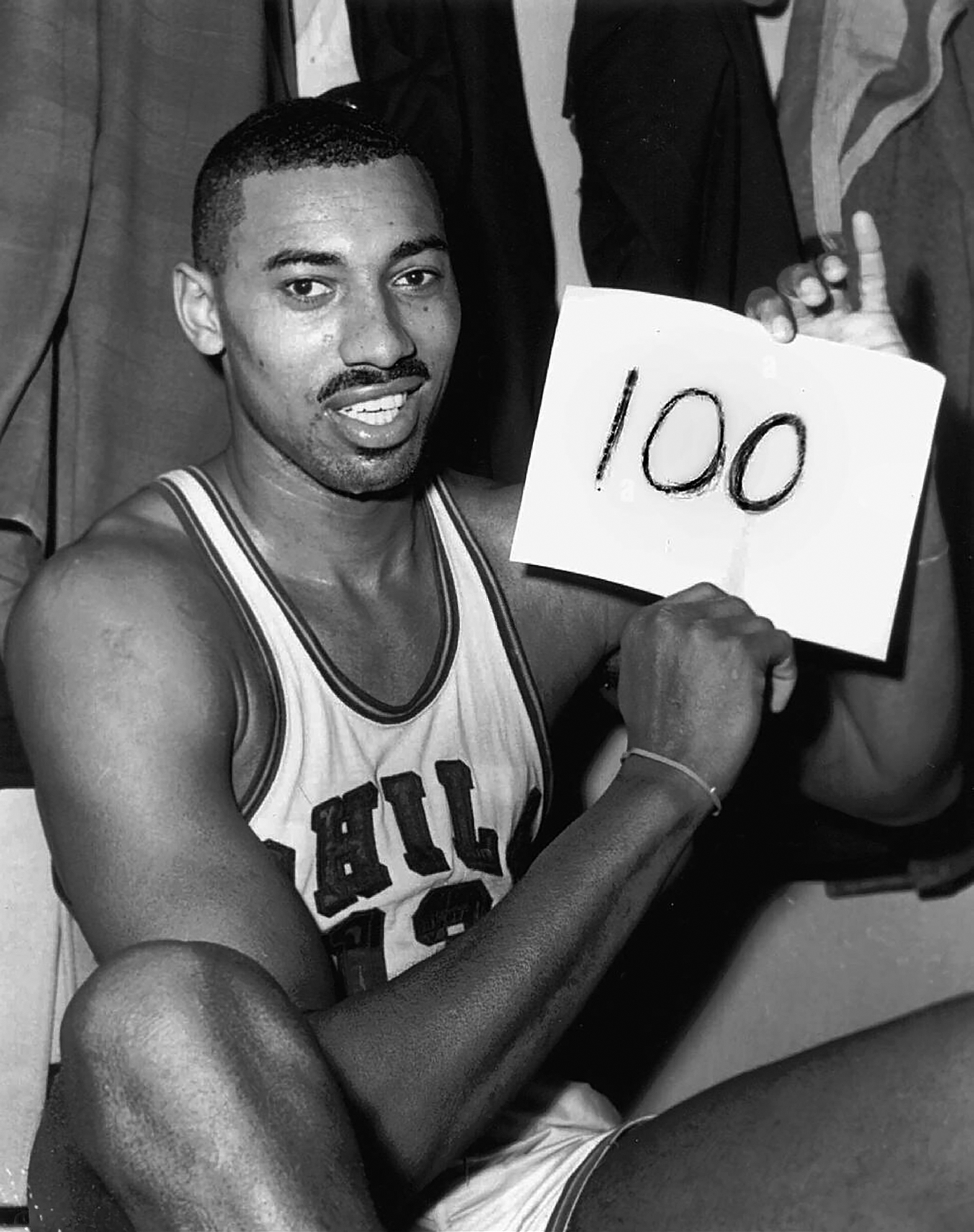
- Chamberlain in the locker room immediately after the game displaying a sign reading "100"
New York Knicks	Philadelphia Warriors
147	169
Head coach: Eddie Donovan	Head coach: Frank McGuire
	1	2	3	4	Total
New York Knicks	26	42	38	41	147
Philadelphia Warriors	42	37	46	44	169
- Date: March 2, 1962
- Venue: Hershey Sports Arena, Hershey, Pennsylvania
- Attendance: 4,124

Wilt Chamberlain set the single-game scoring record in the National Basketball Association (NBA) by scoring 100 points for the Philadelphia Warriors in a 169–147 win over the New York Knicks on March 2, 1962, at Hershey Sports Arena in Hershey, Pennsylvania, United States. It is widely considered one of the greatest records in basketball history. Chamberlain set five other league records that game, including most free throws made, despite being regarded as a poor free throw shooter; that record has since been tied by Adrian Dantley and later, surpassed by Bam Adebayo. The teams broke the record for most combined points in a game (316).

That season, Chamberlain averaged a single-season record 50.4 points per game, and he broke the NBA single-game scoring record (71) earlier in the season in December with 78 points. The third-year center had already set season scoring records in his first two seasons. During the fourth quarter, the Knicks began fouling other players to keep the ball away from Chamberlain, and they also became deliberate on offense to reduce the number of possessions for Philadelphia. The Warriors countered by committing fouls of their own to get the ball back.

The game was not televised, and no video footage of the game has been recovered; there are only audio recordings of the game's fourth quarter, which was added for preservation in the United States' National Recording Registry by the Library of Congress in 2016. The NBA was not yet recognized as a major sports league, and struggled to compete against college basketball. The attendance at the game was approximately half of capacity, and no members of the New York press were present.

== Prologue ==
A 7-foot-1-inch (2.16 m) and 260-pound (120 kg) center, Chamberlain was in his third season in the NBA, having set season scoring records in each of his first two seasons with 37.6 and then 38.4 points per game. Frank McGuire, the Warriors' new coach, started the season vowing to get the ball to Chamberlain "two-thirds of the time." Sports Illustrated wrote that McGuire's "eventual effect may be to measurably change the character of professional basketball from the brawling, hustling, cigar-in-the-face and eye-on-the-till game it has been for decades to the major league sport which it longs and deserves to be." He was determined to play Chamberlain every minute of every game; the center had missed only eight minutes and 33 seconds that season due to disqualification in a game from technical fouls. In three earlier games that week, Chamberlain had scored 67, 65, and 61 points respectively, giving him an already-record 15 times scoring 60 or more points in his career. He was closing in on 4,000 points for the season, needing 237 more; no other player had ever scored 3,000 points at that point. On December 8, 1961, in a triple overtime game versus the Los Angeles Lakers, he set a new NBA record by scoring 78 points, breaking the record of 71 previously set by Elgin Baylor. Legendary Laker broadcaster Chick Hearn often told the story that after the game, he asked Baylor if it bothered him that Chamberlain had an extra 15 minutes to break the record. According to Hearn, Baylor said he was not concerned because "someday that guy is going to score 100". Rival center Bill Russell predicted, "[Chamberlain] has the size, strength, and stamina to score one hundred some night." In a high school game in 1955, Chamberlain had scored 90 points in a 123–21 victory. The Philadelphia Inquirer wrote, "Chamberlain might have hit 100 if he had played the entire 32 minutes."

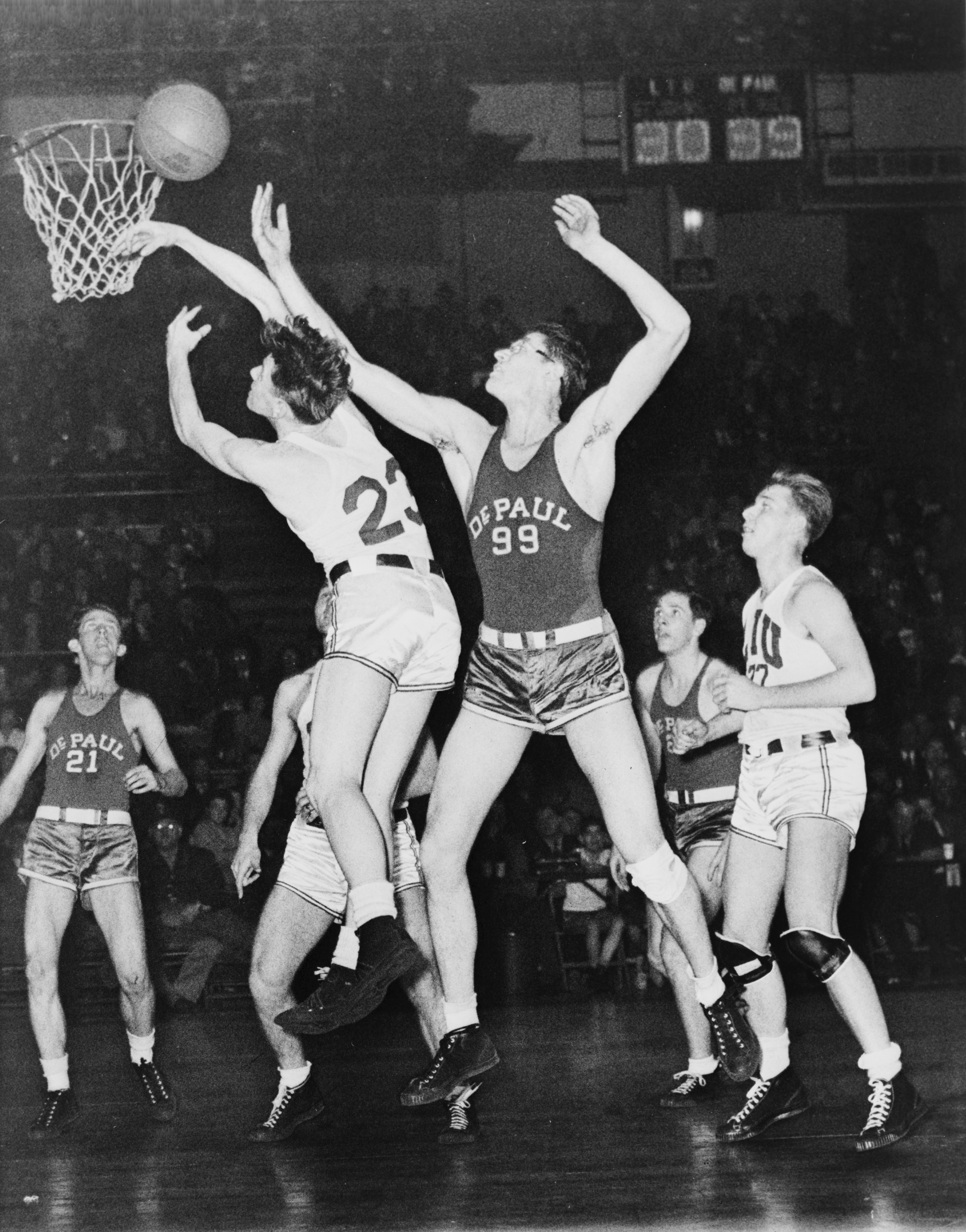
George Mikan (No. 99), shown here in college, dominated the NBA before Chamberlain.

Before Chamberlain, the most dominant big man in the NBA had been 6-foot-10-inch (2.08 m) George Mikan. In November 1950, the Fort Wayne Pistons held the ball for minutes at a time without shooting to limit the impact of the Minneapolis Lakers' Mikan. The Pistons attempted 13 shots in the game, and won 19–18. NBA President Maurice Podoloff said, "In our game, with the number of stars we have, we of necessity run up big scores." In the 1950–51 season, teams averaged just over 80 points per game. The NBA introduced the 24-second shot clock in 1954, and league scoring and attendance increased. By the 1961–62 season, teams were averaging 119 points each game. Chamberlain that season was one of 37 black players in the league, the NBA having started the integration of blacks in 1950. With their emergence, the NBA game was stylistically being played faster and above the rim. Many of the league's great players were black, and blacks believed they were limited by a league quota of four black players per team. Critics suggested that basketball was becoming uninteresting with taller players dominating. Warriors teammate Joe Ruklick thought that "the attitude [among white players in the NBA] was, in my opinion, '[Chamberlain] is a freak who will come and go. There will never be a black guy doing this again.'" Chamberlain, nicknamed Dipper, was revolutionizing the sport with his slam dunks, nicknamed the Dipper Dunk. Traditionalists considered dunking poor sportsmanship, and their occurrence was rare. As the league's second-tallest player, (Note: Swede Halbrook of the Syracuse Nationals was 7 feet 3 inches (2.21 m)) Chamberlain began dunking more regularly. He was still more of a finesse player, preferring fadeaway shots and finger rolls. He rarely dunked forcefully. Teammate Paul Arizin believed Chamberlain did not want to be perceived as great merely by being tall.

There was little advance excitement about the pending Warriors-Knicks game that Friday. Only five games remained in the regular season, with the Warriors (46–29) in second place—eleven games behind the Boston Celtics—and the Knicks in last place. Chamberlain had spent the night before the game in New York City, (Note: Despite playing for Philadelphia, Chamberlain lived in Manhattan; he commuted to Philadelphia each day for the team's activities.) partying all night with a female companion before dropping her off at her home at 6 am. With no sleep and suffering from a hangover, he boarded the train to Philadelphia at 8 am, met several friends at the Philadelphia train station, and had a long lunch with them, thus almost missing the team bus to Hershey. The other players were similarly bored. Warriors player York Larese said, "The biggest thrill in my life was to see that. There was nothing exciting about the Knicks playing the Warriors in Hershey. Chocolate was more exciting." The game was played at Hershey Sports Arena, an old, drafty gym originally built for ice hockey. The league occasionally played games in remote towns to attract new fans. This was the Warriors' third "home" game of the season in Hershey, which was 85 miles (137 km) from Philadelphia. The Warriors' Tom Meschery called the arena a "god-forsaken place... The town of Hershey was built around a huge chocolate factory; everything there became permeated with the smell of chocolate. It was practically impossible to stay indoors; people felt sick. I was just dreaming to leave the place as fast as I could."

On a cold, rainy Friday night, only 4,124 spectators paid to see the game, primarily to see players from the Philadelphia Eagles play an exhibition basketball game against their colleagues from the Baltimore Colts before the NBA game started. The arena's capacity was over 8,000, and Warriors owner Eddie Gottlieb was infamous for exaggerating attendance numbers. The Warriors' home attendance had dropped from 7,000 in Chamberlain's rookie season to less than 5,000 in this, his third, season. College basketball had started offering doubleheaders during the Great Depression to provide customers value for their money. Fans had grown accustomed to watching two games, so doubleheaders in the NBA became common.

The NBA was still struggling in its 16th season, not yet a major sports league and less established than college basketball. The league was hardly national, with only one team, the Los Angeles Lakers, west of St. Louis. The NBA received low television ratings, and this game was not televised. The National Broadcasting Company (NBC) considered not renewing the league's television contract. No members of the New York press were present, as reporters were in Florida covering spring training for the New York Yankees and the expansion New York Mets. With few in the media present, the Warriors' publicist was tasked this night with being the stringer for the Associated Press (AP), United Press International (UPI), and The Philadelphia Inquirer. Only two photographers were at the game.

The Knicks were shorthanded, with their starting center, Phil Jordon, out with an illness, officially reported as influenza but it was widely suspected he was simply hung over. Jordon, in an early-season game, had played Chamberlain even, scoring 33 points to the Warriors center's 34. The Knicks instead started 6-foot-10-inch (2.08 m), 220-pound (100 kg), second-year player Darrall Imhoff, a strong defensive player in college who led the California Golden Bears to the NCAA championship in 1959 and won a gold medal in the 1960 Summer Olympics. New York also had 6-foot-9-inch (2.06 m), 210-pound (95 kg), backup center Cleveland Buckner, a better shooter than defender, and whom Chamberlain had overpowered for an NBA record 28 points in one quarter two days earlier.

== Game report ==
=== First three quarters ===
According to McGuire, the game did not start with any game plan to get Chamberlain 100 points. After a few minutes, the Warriors led 19–3, and their star center had already scored 13 points and made his first five shots. At the end of the first quarter, the Knicks trailed 42–26, and in his typical style, Chamberlain had already scored 23 points, making all nine of his free throws. Free throws were the weakest part of his game: he made barely more than half in his first two seasons. He had started shooting free throws underhanded that season per McGuire's suggestion. Chamberlain at that point was thinking more about a free throw shooting record than scoring a lot of points; the NBA record was 24 free throws made in a game. Imhoff was soon benched because of foul trouble. After one foul, he snapped at the referee, "Well, why don't you just give the guy a hundred now and we'll all go home!" Neither referee had ever been a lead official before, and Imhoff privately wished a stronger lead was working the game. By halftime, the Warriors had lost some of their edge, but still led 79–68. Chamberlain's point total stood at 41. The Warriors felt little excitement, as he had scored 60 or more points on 15 previous occasions. "I often came into the locker room with 30 or 35 points, therefore, 41 points was not a big deal", Chamberlain later explained. During halftime, the Warriors' Guy Rodgers said, "Let's get the ball to Dip. Let's see how many he can get." McGuire agreed.

This simple tactic proved unstoppable. Soon, he had surpassed 50 points, causing arena speaker Dave Zinkoff to fire up the previously sleepy crowd. Chamberlain also kept his cool despite getting perpetually triple and quadruple-teamed by the Knicks, who did not shy away from hard fouls to distract the center. McGuire was irate and demanded that the referees call more fouls, but Chamberlain could not be stopped. He scored another 28 points to lift his Warriors to a commanding 125–106 lead by the end of the third quarter. His own total stood at 69, nine shy of his previous scoring record. The Knicks' third center, Dave Budd, who alternated with the foul-troubled Imhoff at pivot, later stated that resistance was futile:

You couldn't play [Chamberlain] conventionally because he was so big. The only thing you could attempt to do was either front him, and in that case they'd try to lob it in to him, or beat him down the floor and set up where he wanted to get and force him out a couple of extra steps. The guy weighed 300 or 270 [pounds], so that wasn't easy, either.

Chamberlain now realized he could break his own 73-point scoring record (for a regulation 48-minute game) or his record 78 points, set in triple overtime.

=== Breaking records ===
Dave Zinkoff, the public address announcer, began announcing Chamberlain's point total after each of his baskets. With ten minutes to play in the game, Warriors forward Tom Meschery sensed the team concept breaking down. The team's offense had shifted to getting Chamberlain the ball and then stopping and watching instead of cutting and moving without the ball. Chamberlain needed 25 points with eight minutes remaining to reach 100, a rate equivalent to 150 points in a full game. He scored his 79th point with 7:51 left, breaking his own record and sending the crowd into a frenzy. The 4,124 spectators screamed, "Give it to Wilt! Give it to Wilt!" After he reached 80, the crowd yelled for 100. Chamberlain thought, "Man, these people are tough. I'm tired. I've got 80 points and no one has ever scored 80." The Warriors continued giving Chamberlain the ball. Warrior Al Attles later explained, "We wanted that Wilt got the record, because we all liked him." Attles himself led by example, passing up on an easy layup so that Chamberlain could score points 88 and 89, five minutes before the end.

With six minutes remaining, the Knicks began intentionally fouling any Warrior except Chamberlain, keeping the ball out of the center's hands. New York also began moving the ball slowly and using as much of the shot clock as possible to leave fewer opportunities for him to score. Effectively, they played the opposite of what a normal club would do if they faced a deficit, willingly giving up many easy points instead of making attempts to rally back. Meschery said the Warriors lobbed the ball in from the sideline across the floor directly to Chamberlain, who would use his size and strength to get the ball. Chamberlain was the only Warrior to make a field goal in almost four minutes before Meschery made a jump shot at 4:15. Philadelphia began quickly fouling New York with around four minutes left, reciprocating the intentional foul strategy. Warriors coach Frank McGuire at one point pulled out his entire starting five, save Chamberlain, and replaced them with bench players. (Note: Starters Meschery, Attles, Rodgers, and Arizin were replaced by reserves Ruklick, Larese, Ed Conlin and Ted Luckenbill.) The intention was to foul the Knicks, get the ball back after free throws and give Chamberlain the ball. Thus each team spent the last minutes fouling each other. The Warriors ended with 25 personal fouls, and the Knicks with 32, and lost Imhoff and Willie Naulls with six fouls.

With 2:12 left, Chamberlain had 94 points, and he scored on a fadeaway for his 96th point. His next basket at 1:19 came off a lob pass from York Larese for a powerful dunk that was rare for Chamberlain. Gary M. Pomerantz in his book Wilt, 1962: The Night of 100 Points and the Dawn of a New Era wrote that Chamberlain's usual "Dipper Dunk" was "a considerably less emphatic basket stuff, like a rock that barely ripples the pond." With less than a minute left in the game, Chamberlain set up in the post. Ruklick passed to Rodgers, who passed to Chamberlain close to the basket, but he missed the shot. Ted Luckenbill rebounded and passed it back to Chamberlain, who missed again. Luckenbill again rebounded and this time passed to Ruklick, who eschewed an easy layup and instead lobbed a high pass to Chamberlain. With 46 seconds left, Chamberlain got free from the five Knicks, jumped high and put the ball into the basket to hit the century mark. Eyewitness accounts of the historic basket differ as to whether Chamberlain merely laid the ball in or actually stuffed the ball through the hoop for an alley-oop slam dunk. In any event, the arena exploded in a frenzy, and over 200 spectators stormed the floor, wanting to touch the hero of the night. Ruklick immediately ran to the scorer's table to ensure that he was officially credited with the assist.

=== Finale ===
For years, the belief was that the final 46 seconds of the game were not played after Chamberlain scored his 100th point due to the celebration on the court; Chamberlain himself was quoted as having made that claim. However, recordings from the WCAU radio broadcast include announcer Bill Campbell resuming his play-by-play call after Chamberlain's 100th point and calling the game to its conclusion. A copy of the radio broadcast of the game was uncovered only in 1988. WCAU's original game tape had been recorded over by one of its engineers, a standard practice in those days. However, a Philadelphian had recorded with a Dictaphone part of Campbell's coverage in the fourth quarter, but only the Warriors' possessions. Two years later, a reel-to-reel tape of Campbell's entire fourth quarter call surfaced; Jim Trelease, then a college student at the University of Massachusetts, had recorded a 3 am re-broadcast of the fourth quarter of the game. The NBA merged the reel-to-reel with the Dictaphone tape, which also included a short postgame show. German sports journalist Gunter Bork specified that the interruption resulting from Chamberlain's 100th point lasted for nine minutes, after which play continued.

Over the years, Harvey Pollack, who at the time was in charge of publicity and statistics for the Warriors, has given conflicting statements on the question. In a 1992 book, he was twice quoted as saying that the game ended with 46 seconds remaining. But in a 2002 interview quoted by Chamberlain biographer Robert Cherry, Pollack said that the last 46 seconds were played, and that Chamberlain just stood in the middle circle, waiting for the game to end and not wanting to touch the ball, as "100 sounded better than 102". The game's official box score notes that Warrior Joe Ruklick missed two free throws after the break. Ruklick said he planned to miss the second free throw in hopes that Chamberlain might rebound it and get 102 points.

The radio postgame show reported the Warriors defeating the Knicks 169–150. However, the official scorer's report recorded the game as 169–147, a discrepancy that has never been explained. Chamberlain made 36 of 63 field-goals and 28 of 32 free throws, the latter a far better rate than his roughly 50% career average. In two earlier games at Hershey that season, Chamberlain had made a combined 27 of 38 free throws, 71 percent. The basket rims at the arena were aged, flimsy, and forgiving. Balls would bounce off of typical firm rims, whereas balls near the rim in Hershey were apt to get a good roll and fall in. Playing all 48 minutes of the game, Chamberlain set NBA records for field goals attempted (63) and made (36), free throws made (28), most points in a quarter (31), and half (59). He averaged 73 points in four games that week, exceeding 60 in all of them.

Rodgers finished with a game-high 20 assists and later said: "It was the easiest game ever for me to get assists, all I had to do was pass it to Wilt." Attles was a defensive specialist who rarely scored, yet went 8–8 from the field and hit his single free throw. He later lamented, "In the game where I literally couldn't miss, Wilt had to go out and score 100."

The Warriors and Knicks combined for a record 316 points. Philadelphia fell short of the Boston Celtics' then-record of 173 points in a game. It was not uncommon for late-season NBA games to feature little defense. Celtics guard Bob Cousy said that the level of play in the NBA decreased as the season progressed, and "defenses are out of gas" by the end of the season.

The following night, Chamberlain got permission to travel back to New York with three Knicks players. According to Cherry, Chamberlain drifted in and out of sleep and got a kick overhearing the New York players talk about the "S.O.B. who scored 100 points on us". On March 4, the Warriors played the Knicks again in Madison Square Garden, and Imhoff got a standing ovation for "holding" Chamberlain to 58 points. (Note: Associated Press wrote that Chamberlain scored 54 points. It also reported Imhoff played all 48 minutes, while Wilt, 1962 said he fouled out near the end of the game.)

== Aftermath ==
"True, over-anxiousness caused Wilt to miss some shots he'd ordinarily make. But he made some he wouldn't have dared taken under ordinary circumstances. Long jumpers from 25–30 feet out with two and three men clinging onto the wiry, 260-pound frame. Power-packed dunk shots when he had to bull through, around and over a tight knot of defenders. Blazing speed that carried him downcourt for layups after he had launched the fast break with a rebound himself. He earned every point."

— Jack Kiser, The Philadelphia Inquirer

The record was not highly anticipated like the four-minute mile had been. In Philadelphia, there was little fanfare in The Philadelphia Inquirer or The Philadelphia Bulletin, which both had a box on the front page announcing the achievement with a story in the sports section. The Philadelphia Daily News had no mention on its cover. The Bulletin wrote, "Thus was fulfilled a prophecy made the first time the magnificent 7'1" scoring star of the Warriors played a game in the National Basketball Association three years ago." New York City papers ran stories from the news agencies. The New York Times and The New York Herald Tribune ran the AP story on pages 14 and 11, respectively. The New York Daily News ran the UPI story on page 26. The New York Post gave prominent back-page coverage to Chamberlain's feat on Sunday. The New York Daily News on Sunday wrote, "Basketball is not prospering because most normal sized American youngsters or adults cannot identify themselves with the freakish stars ... You just can't sell a seven-foot basket stuffing monster to even the most gullible adolescent." In his prime, Chamberlain was such a dominant scorer that his feat was mostly taken for granted. Warriors player Al Attles said that after Chamberlain's previous record 78-point game, "It was only a matter of time until he reached 100, you could wait for it." Warriors coach Frank McGuire initially thought the same thing, then said, "I always thought it was inevitable that he would do it. But when he did, I stopped and thought about it. I couldn't believe it."

Chamberlain thanked his teammates. "It wouldn't even have been close to possible without them. They wanted me to get it as much I did." He added, "They had to do more than just give up open shots. They had to avoid fouls and pass me the ball in traffic." Knicks' player Richie Guerin felt the Warriors broke a code of honor in sports by embarrassing an opponent and setting a record outside the normal flow of the game. Although effusive in his praise of Chamberlain, Guerin nonetheless estimated that if the game had played out normally, Chamberlain would have finished 15 to 20 points shy of 100. Chamberlain countered he could have scored 140 if the Knicks "had played straight-up basketball." New York coach Eddie Donovan suggested, "The game was a farce. They would foul us and we would foul them." The Knicks' Naulls stated, "The game was not a fluke ... I thought it was absolutely authentic." Imhoff said Zinkoff's announcements did not help the Knicks' cause.

Johnny Kerr of the Syracuse Nationals marveled, "How about this: He's the world's worst free-throw shooter and he's 28 out of 32!" Cousy figured the game must have gone out of control, just as when Cousy had 29 assists when the Celtics scored 173 points against Minneapolis. Boston coach Red Auerbach laughed, "He's playing against nobody." Bill Russell smiled and said, "The Big Fella finally did it." In a conversation with Naulls after the game, Chamberlain predicted he would win his NBA championships but still be known for his individualism, versus Russell, who was credited for making his team—the Boston Celtics—great. Two days after the historic feat, Chamberlain made a guest appearance on The Ed Sullivan Show.

Chamberlain finished the season with a record of 50.4 points per game. He scored a single-season record 4,029 points, more than the division-winning Warriors in 1947–48 scored as a team. He played in a record 3,882 minutes—including every minute of 79 (a record) of 80 games. He averaged 48.5 minutes per game. An NBA game is 48 minutes, but Chamberlain played in 10 overtime periods in seven games. He was second in the league in field goal percentage at .506 and made 61 percent of his free throws, a career high. The Warriors finished the season with a 49–31 record. They lost in the Eastern Division Finals of the playoffs to the Celtics, losing the seventh game 109–107. The closest Chamberlain came again to 100 was 73 and 72 points the next season, when he also averaged 44.8 points. The NBA in 1964 widened the lane from 12 feet (3.7 m) to 16 feet (4.9 m) to limit Chamberlain, and he averaged 36.9 that season.

== Legacy ==
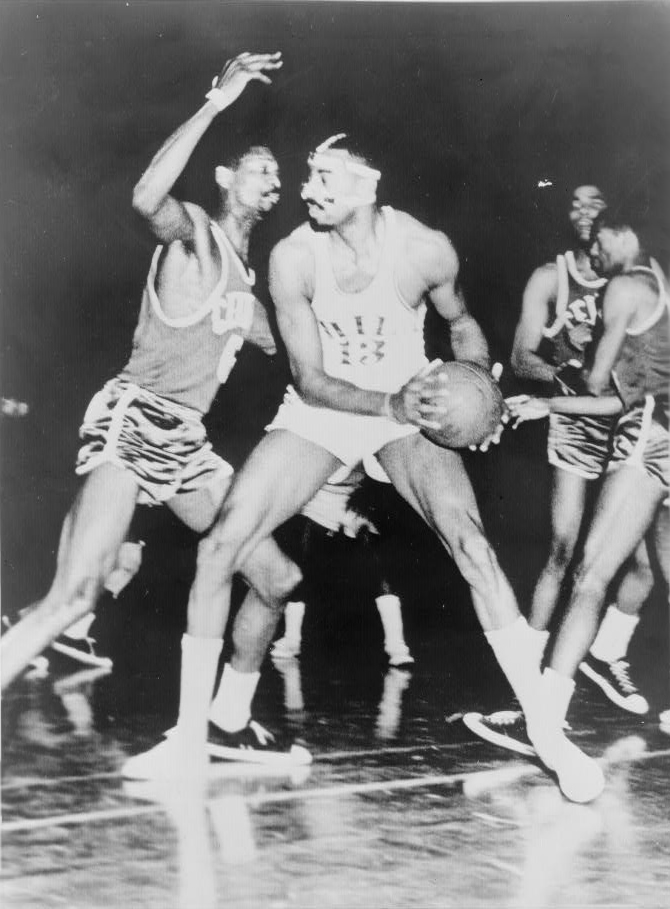
Chamberlain (#13) predicted comparisons to Bill Russell (left).

The anniversary of the game was not widely commemorated until its silver anniversary in 1987. By that time, the NBA had grown to be a popular sports league with average attendance of 13,000 fans per game and star players such as Magic Johnson, Larry Bird, and Michael Jordan. The Warriors' PR director Harvey Pollack said an impossible 40,000 people claimed to have seen the game, and some even testified it took place in Madison Square Garden. Chamberlain later stated it was one of his favorite games, but not the favorite: that title belonged to the match in which he grabbed an NBA record 55 rebounds against perennial rival Bill Russell. He did not want to feed the criticism that he was more interested in personal stardom than winning. Chamberlain publicly embraced the 100-point game in his final years. On a radio show commemorating the game's 31st anniversary in 1993, he said, "As time goes by, I feel more a part of that 100-point game." He explained that growing up on the streets, he would have been derisively labelled a gunner, a glory-hound, for attempting 63 shots. "You take that many shots on the playground, and no one ever wants you on their team again." He said he took shots he normally would not have, noting that in contests which he considered to be better he scored 50 to 60 points on around 75 percent shooting, as opposed to his 57 percent shooting in the 100-point game. He was proud that people who knew nothing about basketball would point out the game to their kids when they saw him.

I know that it has been my tag. I am definitely proud of it. But it was definitely a team effort. You had to see some of the things my teammates did to get me the ball ... It was almost like a circus out there for a while.

Two other participants were profoundly affected. Knicks center Darrall Imhoff was branded as the player who let Chamberlain score 100 on him, although he only played 20 of 48 minutes and was not on the court when it happened. On the other hand, the game immortalized little-used Warriors reserve player Joe Ruklick as the man who gave Chamberlain the 100th point assist. Decades later, The New York Times interviewed Ruklick and found out that he refers to himself as "a walking footnote" of one of basketball's greatest moments. The game also produced the famous picture of Chamberlain sitting on a bench, holding up a paper with a scribbled "100". The photograph was actually a matter of improvisation: when Warriors PR manager Harvey Pollack entered the Warriors locker room, he took a paper and scribbled the number on it, and Associated Press photographer Paul Vathis who was at the game (not for professional reasons, but rather because he wanted to give his son a treat) took the now-famous photo. Cherry calls it the "ultimate picture" of Wilt Chamberlain.

Chamberlain's 100 points is widely considered one of basketball's greatest records. Decades after his record was set, many NBA teams did not even average 100 points, as fewer field goals per game were being attempted. The closest any player has gotten to 100 points was the Heat's Bam Adebayo, who scored 83 in a 150–129 win over the Washington Wizards on March 10, 2026. David Thompson broke Chamberlain's record for points in a quarter by scoring 32 in the first quarter of his 73-point game. (Note: George Gervin broke that record seven hours later by scoring 33.) Adrian Dantley tied the record of 28 free throws made in a regular season game on January 4, 1984, but through the 2010–11 season, all of Chamberlain's other records set that day still stand. Twenty years after the Warriors and Knicks combined for 316 points, the San Antonio Spurs defeated the Milwaukee Bucks 171–166 in triple overtime on March 6, 1982, for a total of 337 points. That record was broken more quickly, as the Detroit Pistons defeated the Denver Nuggets 186–184 (also in triple overtime) on December 13, 1983, for 370 points.

Pomerantz wrote in his 2005 book that the lack of videotape of the 100-point game "only added to its mystique." For a while, NBA Commissioner David Stern's office phone would play Campbell's call of the 100-point basket to callers on hold: "He made it! He made it! He made it! A Dipper Dunk!" Kerry Ryman, who was 14 years old when he attended the game, said that he left the arena with the basketball that Chamberlain used to score his famous basket. The ball was auctioned by Lelands Auction in 2000 for $551,844, which was the then-third highest sports memorabilia auction price. After controversy over the ball's authenticity, the sale was suspended. The ball was relisted months later and sold for $67,791. Attles stated that Chamberlain gave him the actual 100-point ball. In 2014, Josh Pastner, then head coach of the Memphis Tigers, stated that his father, who was a ballboy for the Warriors, had taped the game starting in the second quarter. Pastner's father had been attempting to locate the footage among his many boxes, but he also conceded that the footage might be lost.

In 1961–1962, the NBA's three highest scoring averages were by black players (Chamberlain, Baylor, Walt Bellamy). Oscar Robertson, a Hall of Famer, believes the NBA would have lost its small television contract and not survived without the emergence of black superstars. "People heard about Wilt scoring a 100, averaging 50 a night, and they wanted to see the guy do it ... I believe Wilt Chamberlain single-handedly saved the league." Naulls wrote, "Wilt had rung the bell of freedom loud and clear, shouting, 'Let my people be free to express themselves.' For we were and will be for all time those who withstood the humiliation of racial quotas even to the point of the NBA's facing extinction because of retarded expression and stagnating growth."

In 2016, the extant fourth quarter audio recording of the 100-point game was added to the National Recording Registry for its "cultural, artistic and/or historical significance to American society and the nation's aural legacy."

== Box score ==
March 2, 1962

Boxscore

Philadelphia Warriors 169, New York Knicks 147
Scoring by quarter: 42–26, 37–42, 46–38, 44–41
Pts: Wilt Chamberlain 100; Rebs: Wilt Chamberlain 25; Asts: Guy Rodgers 20	Pts: Richie Guerin 39; Rebs: Dave Budd 10; Asts: Richie Guerin 6

Hershey Sports Arena, Hershey, Pennsylvania
Attendance: 4,124
Referees: Willie Smith and Pete D'Ambrosio

Legend
Pos	Position	Min	Minutes played	FGM	Field goals made	FGA	Field goals attempted	FTM	Free throws made
FTA	Free throws attempted	Reb	Rebounds	Ast	Assists	PF	Personal fouls	Pts	Points

Philadelphia Warriors
Player	Pos	Min	FGM	FGA	FTM	FTA	Reb	Ast	PF	Pts
Paul Arizin	F	31	7	18	2	2	5	4	0	16
Tom Meschery	F	40	7	12	2	2	7	3	4	16
Wilt Chamberlain	C	48	36	63	28	32	25	2	2	100
Guy Rodgers	G	48	1	4	9	12	7	20	5	11
Al Attles	G	34	8	8	1	1	5	6	4	17
York Larese		14	4	5	1	1	1	2	5	9
Ed Conlin		14	0	4	0	0	4	1	1	0
Joe Ruklick		8	0	1	0	2	2	1	2	0
Ted Luckenbill		3	0	0	0	0	1	0	2	0
Team rebounds							3			
Team totals		240	63	115	43	52	60	39	25	169

New York Knicks
Player	Pos	Min	FGM	FGA	FTM	FTA	Reb	Ast	PF	Pts
Willie Naulls	F	43	9	22	13	15	7	2	5	31
Johnny Green	F	21	3	7	0	0	7	1	5	6
Darrall Imhoff	C	20	3	7	1	1	6	0	6	7
Richie Guerin	G	46	13	29	13	17	8	6	5	39
Al Butler	G	32	4	13	0	0	7	3	1	8
Cleveland Buckner		33	16	26	1	1	8	0	4	33
Dave Budd		27	6	8	1	1	10	1	1	13
Donnie Butcher		18	3	6	4	6	3	4	5	10
Team rebounds							4			
Team totals		240	57	118	33	41	60	17	32	147

Wilt Chamberlain's statistics by quarter

Quarter	Min	FGM	FGA	FTM	FTA	Reb	Ast	PF	Pts
1st	12	7	14	9	9	10	0	0	23
2nd	12	7	12	4	5	4	1	1	18
3rd	12	10	16	8	8	6	1	0	28
4th	12	12	21	7	10	5	0	1	31

== See also ==
- Kobe Bryant's 81-point game
- Bam Adebayo's 83-point game
- List of basketball players who have scored 100 points in a single game
- List of career achievements by Wilt Chamberlain
