= List of highest-scoring NBA games =

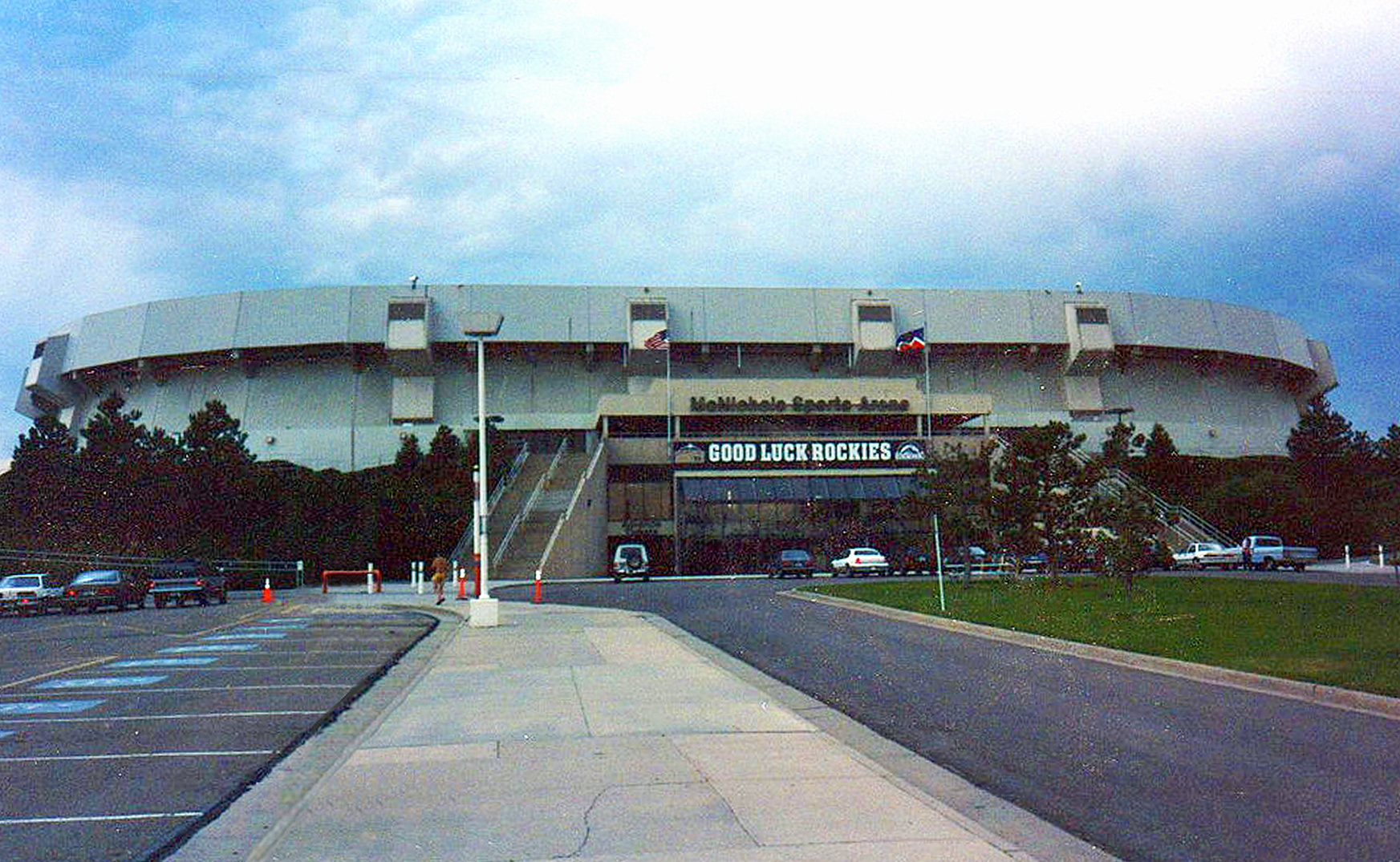
McNichols Arena in Denver was the site of the highest-scoring game in NBA history.

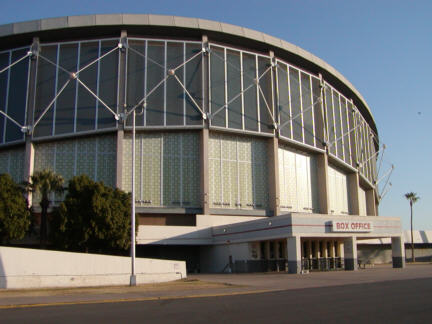
Arizona Veterans Memorial Coliseum in Phoenix was the site of the highest-scoring playoff game.

In basketball, points are used to keep track of the score in a game. Points can be accumulated by making field goals (worth two points from within the three-point line or three points from beyond the three-point line) or free throws (worth one point). The team that records the most points at the end of a game is declared the game's winner. If the game is still tied at the end of regulation play, additional overtime period(s) are played in order to determine the winner.

In the years following the founding of the National Basketball Association (NBA) in 1946, teams only averaged around 80 points per game. Before the introduction of the shot clock, teams often ran out the clock by passing the ball more frequently after having established a lead in a game. If one team did choose to stall, the opposing team (especially if behind) would often commit fouls to regain possession. This resulted in very low-scoring games with excessive fouls, which negatively affected attendance. Beginning in the 1954–55 season, the NBA implemented a 24-second shot clock, the aim of which was to speed up the game and create a more entertaining experience for those in attendance. If the offensive team failed to hit the rim with the ball within the allotted 24 seconds, they would lose possession. This innovation resulted in higher average scores. Consequently, all of the highest-scoring games in the NBA have happened during the shot-clock era.

== Summary ==
The highest-scoring regular-season game in NBA history is the triple-overtime game between the Detroit Pistons and the Denver Nuggets on December 13, 1983. The two teams combined to score 370 points, with the Pistons defeating the Nuggets 186–184. An NBA-record four players scored over 40 points in the game, including the Nuggets' Kiki Vandeweghe with a game-high 51. The two teams also set several other NBA records, including the most points scored by one team (186 points), the most points scored by a losing team (184), the most field goals by two teams (142), most field goals by one team (74) and most assists by two teams (93).

The highest-scoring regular season game in regulation was between the Golden State Warriors and the Denver Nuggets on November 2, 1990. In that game, Golden State defeated Denver 162–158. The Warriors' Chris Mullin scored a game-high 38 points. The Nuggets were coached by Doug Moe from 1980 to 1990 and Paul Westhead from 1990 to 1992, both of whom employed a run-and-gun offensive strategy, which focuses on attempting a high number of field goals while also conceding a large number of points on defense. In fact, Moe's and Westhead's Nuggets were participants in four of the ten highest-scoring regular season games in NBA history. The Warriors were coached by Don Nelson from 1988 to 1995 and 2006 to 2010. He employed Nellie Ball, a style of run and gun that uses smaller, more athletic players to outrun opponents. Another notable high-scoring regular season game is a March 2, 1962, game between the Philadelphia Warriors and the New York Knicks. In that game, the Warriors' Wilt Chamberlain scored an NBA-record 100 points.

The highest-scoring playoff game is the double-overtime game between the Portland Trail Blazers and the Phoenix Suns on May 11, 1992. The two teams combined to score 304 points, with the Trail Blazers defeating the Suns 153–151. The Suns' Kevin Johnson scored a game-high 35 points, with 12 other players also scoring in double figures. The highest-scoring playoff game in regulation occurred when the San Antonio Spurs defeated the Denver Nuggets with a score of 152–133 for a combined score of 285 points on April 26, 1983. In that game, the Spurs' George Gervin scored a game-high 42 points.

Most of the highest-scoring games happened before the 1995–96 season, when the average scoring (points per game) per team was always in the 100s. Until the emergence of small ball in 2013, the average had dropped down to the 90s. From 1995 though 2012, only two games made the top-ten lists of both the regular season and playoffs: a May 10, 2003, game between the Dallas Mavericks and the Sacramento Kings and a December 7, 2006, game between the Phoenix Suns and New Jersey Nets. The Mavericks and the Suns were coached by Nelson and Mike D'Antoni respectively, both of whom also made use of the run-and-gun style. The 2018–19 season saw an entry into this list with a quadruple-overtime game between the Chicago Bulls and Atlanta Hawks. The 2022–23 season then saw an entry into this list with the second-highest scoring game in history, a double-overtime game between the Los Angeles Clippers and Sacramento Kings.

== List ==
Key
OT	Overtime (the number indicates the number of overtime periods played)
*	Indicates a game that was won by the road team

=== Highest-scoring regular season games ===
Rank	Total points	Date	Location	Winner	Result	OT	Loser	Notes	Ref.
1	370	December 13, 1983	McNichols Arena; Denver, Colorado	Detroit Pistons*	186–184	3	Denver Nuggets	NBA records; Highest-scoring record (Note: It has been the record for 42 years, 333 days.); The winning and losing teams respectively scored the most and second-most points in a game by one team; The teams combined for 142 field goals; The teams combined for 93 total assists; 4 players scored at least 40 points; Nuggets' Kiki VanDeWeghe scored a game-high 51 points, a career high.; Leading scorers; Pistons: Isiah Thomas (47), John Long (41), Kelly Tripucka (35) (Note: Others with double-digit point totals were Terry Tyler (18), Bill Laimbeer (17), Vinnie Johnson (12).); Nuggets: VanDeWeghe (51), Alex English (47), Dan Issel (28) (Note: Others with double-digit point totals were Mike Evans (16), Richard Anderson (13), Danny Schayes (11).)	
2	351	February 24, 2023	Crypto.com Arena; Los Angeles, California	Sacramento Kings*	176–175	2	Los Angeles Clippers	Tied a then-record of combined 44 three-pointers made by both teams (was since broken on December 15, 2024).; Second NBA game in which both teams scored 170+ points.; Third and fourth NBA teams to score 175+ points.; With both teams scoring 153 points in regulation, this game set the NBA record of the highest tie game score at the conclusion of regulation, breaking the previous record of the aforementioned 1983 Pistons-Nuggets game where both teams scored 145 points in regulation.; Kings' Malik Monk scored a game-high 45 points, a career high.; Leading scorers; Kings: Monk (45), De'Aaron Fox (42), Domantas Sabonis (20) (Note: Others with double-digit point totals were Keegan Murray (15), Harrison Barnes (11), Kevin Huerter (11), Trey Lyles (10).); Clippers: Kawhi Leonard (44), Paul George (34), Norman Powell (24) (Note: Others with double-digit point totals were Nicolas Batum (19), Russell Westbrook (17), Terance Mann (10), Mason Plumlee (10).); This game was also the debut of Russell Westbrook as a Clipper.	
3	337	March 6, 1982	HemisFair Arena; San Antonio, Texas	San Antonio Spurs	171–166	3	Milwaukee Bucks	Former highest-scoring record (Note: This was the record from March 6, 1982, to December 13, 1983. It lasted for 1 year, 282 days.); 3 players scored 40+ points; Spurs' George Gervin scored a game-high 50 points.; Leading scorers; Spurs: Gervin (50), Mike Mitchell (45) (Note: Others with double-digit point totals were Dave Corzine (19), Johnny Moore (16), Mike Bratz (14).); Bucks: Brian Winters (42), Junior Bridgeman (31), Bob Lanier (29) (Note: Others with double-digit point totals were Sidney Moncrief (18), Quinn Buckner (18), Marques Johnson (14).)	
4	329	March 1, 2019	State Farm Arena; Atlanta, Georgia	Chicago Bulls*	168–161	4	Atlanta Hawks	Highest scoring game with 4 or more overtimes in the NBA.; Most losses by the losing team in a game with more than 316 points.; Most losses by the winning team in a game with more than 316 points.; Hawks' Trae Young scored a game-high 49 points.; Leading scorers; Bulls: Zach LaVine (47), Otto Porter Jr. (31), Lauri Markkanen (31) (Note: Others with double-digit point totals were Kris Dunn (14), Shaquille Harrison (13), Robin Lopez (11), Ryan Arcidiacono (10).); Hawks: Trae Young (49), (Note: Trae Young's high-scoring game came under his rookie season.) Alex Len (24) (Note: Others with double-digit point totals were Taurean Prince (17), Kevin Huerter (15), Dewayne Dedmon (14), Vince Carter (13), DeAndre' Bembry (13).)	
5	320	November 2, 1990	McNichols Arena; Denver, Colorado	Golden State Warriors*	162–158	—	Denver Nuggets	Highest-scoring game in regulation; Warriors' Chris Mullin scored a game-high 38 points.; Season opener of the 1990–91 season for both teams.; Leading scorers; Warriors: Mullin (38), Tim Hardaway (32), Mitch Richmond (29) (Note: Others with double-digit point totals were Tom Tolbert (18), Rod Higgins (17).); Nuggets: Orlando Woolridge (37), Walter Davis (33) (Note: Others with double-digit point totals were Todd Lichti (19), Michael Adams (18), T. R. Dunn (12), Jerome Lane (11), Blair Rasmussen (10).)	
6	318	January 11, 1984	McNichols Arena; Denver, Colorado	Denver Nuggets	163–155	—	San Antonio Spurs	NBA record; Both teams combined to score 99 points in a quarter (Note: In the fourth quarter, the Spurs scored 53 points and the Nuggets scored 46 points.); Nuggets' Kiki Vandeweghe scored a game-high 50 points.; Leading scorers; Nuggets: Vandeweghe (50), Alex English (25) (Note: Others with double-digit point totals were Dan Issel (17), Howard Carter (16), Mike Evans (12), Bill Hanzlik (11), Richard Anderson (10).); Spurs: George Gervin (38), John Lucas II (23) (Note: Others with double-digit point totals were Gene Banks (17), Edgar Jones (17), Artis Gilmore (15), Keith Edmonson (14), Mark McNamara (14).)	
6	318	December 7, 2006	Continental Airlines Arena; East Rutherford, New Jersey	Phoenix Suns*	161–157	2	New Jersey Nets	Suns' Steve Nash scored a game-high 42 points.; Nets' Jason Kidd recorded a triple-double. (Note: Kidd recorded 38 points, 14 rebounds and 14 assists.); Leading scorers; Suns: Nash (42), Shawn Marion (33), Raja Bell (24), Amare Stoudemire (23) (Note: Others with double-digit point totals were Boris Diaw (16), Leandro Barbosa (16).); Nets: Kidd (38), Vince Carter (31), Richard Jefferson (25) (Note: Others with double-digit point totals were Marcus Williams (18), Mikki Moore (14), Eddie House (12), Nenad Krstić (10).)	
8	317	October 30, 2019	Capital One Arena; Washington, D.C.	Houston Rockets*	159–158	—	Washington Wizards	Rockets' James Harden scored a game-high 59 points.; Rockets' Russell Westbrook recorded a triple-double. (Note: Westbrook recorded 17 points, 10 rebounds and 12 assists.); Leading scorers; Rockets: Harden (59), Clint Capela (21) (Note: Others with double-digit point totals were Westbrook (17), Danuel House (16), Eric Gordon (15), Austin Rivers (11).); Wizards: Bradley Beal (46), Rui Hachimura (23), Dāvis Bertāns (21) (Note: Others with double-digit point totals were Isaiah Thomas (17), Troy Brown Jr. (14), Thomas Bryant (13), Moritz Wagner (12).)	
9	316	March 2, 1962	Hershey Sports Arena; Hershey, Pennsylvania	Philadelphia Warriors	169–147	—	New York Knicks	Former highest-scoring record (Note: This was the record from March 2, 1962, to March 6, 1982. It lasted for 20 years, 4 days.); NBA record; Warriors' Wilt Chamberlain scored a game-high 100 points. (Note: This is Chamberlain's career high. Chamberlain also recorded 25 rebounds.); Leading scorers; Warriors: Chamberlain (100) (Note: Others with double-digit point totals were Al Attles (17), Paul Arizin (16), Tom Meschery (16), Guy Rodgers (11).); Knicks: Richie Guerin (39), Willie Naulls (33), Cleveland Buckner (31) (Note: Others with double-digit point totals were Dave Budd (13), Donnie Butcher (10).)	
9	316	March 12, 1970	Cincinnati Gardens; Cincinnati	Cincinnati Royals	165–151	—	San Diego Rockets	Former highest-scoring record (Note: This tied for the record from March 12, 1970, to March 6, 1982. It lasted for 11 years, 359 days.); Rockets' Elvin Hayes scored a game-high 40 points.; Leading scorers; Royals: Tom Van Arsdale (36), Connie Dierking (34), Johnny Green (29), Oscar Robertson (28), Norm Van Lier (22) (Note: Other with double-digit point totals was Wally Anderzunas (12).); Rockets: Hayes (40), Don Kojis (23), John Block (20) (Note: Others with double-digit point totals were Bingo Smith (16), Stu Lantz (14), Bernie Williams (12), Toby Kimball (11).)	
9	316	November 10, 1990	Arizona Veterans Memorial Coliseum; Phoenix, Arizona	Phoenix Suns	173–143	—	Denver Nuggets	NBA record; The Suns tied the Celtics (1959) for most points scored by one team in regulation.; The Suns did not make a single three-point shot attempt.; Both teams combined to score 174 points in a half (Note: In the first half, the Suns scored 107 points and the Nuggets scored 67 points.); The Suns scored 107 points during the first half of the game.; Nuggets' Orlando Woolridge scored a game-high 40 points.; Leading scorers; Suns: Cedric Ceballos (32), Kevin Johnson (23), Kenny Battle (23), Dan Majerle (21), Tom Chambers (20) (Note: Others with double-digit point totals were Mark West (16), Jeff Hornacek (12), Eddie Johnson (12).); Nuggets: Woolridge (40), Mahmoud Abdul-Rauf (26), Walter Davis (22) (Note: Other with double-digit point totals was Anthony Cook (13).)	

=== Highest-scoring playoff games ===
Highest-scoring playoff games
Rank	Total points	Date	Location	Winner	Result	OT	Loser	Notes	Ref.
1	304	May 11, 1992	Arizona Veterans Memorial Coliseum; Phoenix, Arizona	Portland Trail Blazers*	153–151	2	Phoenix Suns	NBA highest-scoring playoff game record (Note: It has been the record for 34 years, 184 days.); Suns' Kevin Johnson scored a game-high 35 points; Leading scorers; Trail Blazers: Clyde Drexler (33), Terry Porter (31), Danny Ainge (25), Jerome Kersey (21) (Note: Others with double-digit point totals were Clifford Robinson (16), Kevin Duckworth (14), Buck Williams (11).); Suns: Johnson (35), Tom Chambers (29), Jeff Hornacek (23), Dan Majerle (21) (Note: Others with double-digit point totals were Cedric Ceballos (19), Andrew Lang (13).); Game 4 of the conference semifinals, Trail Blazers won the series 4–1; Last NBA game at Arizona Veterans Memorial Coliseum	
2	287	June 1, 2021	Ball Arena; Denver, Colorado	Denver Nuggets	147–140	2	Portland Trail Blazers	NBA playoff record; Trail Blazers' Damian Lillard set single-game playoff record with 12 three-pointers.; Lillard scored a game-high 55 points, setting a franchise single-game playoff record.; Leading scorers; Nuggets:Nikola Jokić (38), Monté Morris (28), Michael Porter Jr. (26) (Note: Others with double-digit point totals were Austin Rivers (18), Aaron Gordon (14).); Trail Blazers: Lillard (55) (Note: Others with double-digit point totals were Robert Covington (19), CJ McCollum (18), Jusuf Nurkić (13), Norman Powell (13).); Game 5 of the first round, Nuggets won the series 4–2.	
3	285	April 26, 1983	HemisFair Arena; San Antonio, Texas	San Antonio Spurs	152–133	—	Denver Nuggets	Former highest-scoring playoffs record; (Note: This was the record from April 26, 1983 to May 11, 1992. It lasted for 9 years, 15 days.) tied record for highest-scoring playoff game to not go into overtime (Note: This specific tie was made on April 28, 1990, with that tied record also sharing the mark until May 11, 1992. That shared tied record would last for 2 years, 13 days.); Spurs' George Gervin scored a game-high 42 points; Leading scorers; Spurs: Gervin (42), Johnny Moore (24), Gene Banks (22), Mike Mitchell (22) (Note: Others with double-digit point totals were Artis Gilmore (13), Edgar Jones (10).); Nuggets: Dan Issel (28), Alex English (26), Kiki Vandeweghe (22) (Note: Others with double-digit point totals were Billy McKinney (13), Danny Schayes (12), Rob Williams (12).); Game 1 of the conference semifinals, Spurs won the series 4–1	
3	285	April 28, 1990	Boston Garden; Boston, Massachusetts	Boston Celtics	157–128	—	New York Knicks	Tied record for highest-scoring playoff game to not go into overtime; Most points scored by one team in a playoff game (157); Celtics' Kevin McHale scored a game-high 31 points; Leading scorers; Celtics: McHale (31), Reggie Lewis (21) (Note: Others with double-digit point totals were Robert Parish (18), Ed Pinckney (16), Larry Bird (15), Dennis Johnson (12), Jim Paxson (11), John Bagley (10).); Knicks: Patrick Ewing (28), Gerald Wilkins (24), Johnny Newman (21) (Note: Others with double-digit point totals were Kiki Vandeweghe (13), Charles Oakley (11), Mark Jackson (11).); Game 2 of the first round, Knicks won the series 3–2	
5	280	April 23, 1987	Reunion Arena; Dallas, Texas	Dallas Mavericks	151–129	—	Seattle SuperSonics	SuperSonics' Tom Chambers scored a game-high 35 points; Leading scorers; Mavericks: Mark Aguirre (28), Roy Tarpley (25) (Note: Others with double-digit point totals were Rolando Blackman (18), Derek Harper (18), James Donaldson (15), Sam Perkins (12), Detlef Schrempf (10), Brad Davis (10), Bill Wennington (10).); SuperSonics: Chambers (35), Dale Ellis (22) (Note: Others with double-digit point totals were Xavier McDaniel (18), Eddie Johnson (14), Kevin Williams (14), Russ Schoene (11).); Game 1 of the first round, SuperSonics won the series 3–1	
6	279	April 1, 1967	Oakland–Alameda County Coliseum Arena; Oakland, California	San Francisco Warriors	143–136	—	St. Louis Hawks	Former highest-scoring record (Note: This was the record from April 1, 1967, to April 26, 1983. It lasted for 16 years, 25 days.); Warriors' Rick Barry scored a game-high 47 points; Leading scorers; Warriors: Barry (47), Jeff Mullins (26), Nate Thurmond (22) (Note: Others with double-digit point totals were Jim King (13), Tom Meschery (13), Fred Hetzel (12).); Hawks: Bill Bridges (26), Lou Hudson (24), Richie Guerin (22), Lenny Wilkens (22) (Note: Others with double-digit point totals were Zelmo Beaty (19), Joe Caldwell (18).); Game 2 of the division finals, Warriors won the series 4–2	
7	278	March 25, 1957	Minneapolis Auditorium; Minneapolis, Minnesota	St. Louis Hawks*	143–135	2	Minneapolis Lakers	Former highest-scoring record (Note: This was the record from March 25, 1957, to April 1, 1967. It lasted for 10 years, 7 days.); Lakers' Bobby Leonard scored a game-high 42 points; Leading scorers; Hawks: Bob Pettit (35), Slater Martin (26), Cliff Hagan (22) (Note: Others with double-digit point totals were Ed Macauley (19), Jack McMahon (18), Chuck Share (15).); Lakers: Leonard (42), Clyde Lovellette (22), Walter Dukes (21) (Note: Others with double-digit point totals were Ed Kalafat (17), Vern Mikkelsen (16).); Game 3 of the division finals, Hawks won the series 3–0	
7	278	May 10, 2003	ARCO Arena; Sacramento, California	Dallas Mavericks*	141–137	2	Sacramento Kings	Mavericks' Nick Van Exel scored a game-high 40 points; Leading scorers; Mavericks: Van Exel (40), Steve Nash (31), Dirk Nowitzki (25), Michael Finley (20) (Note: Other with double-digit point totals was Walt Williams (10).); Kings: Peja Stojaković (39), Vlade Divac (20) (Note: Others with double-digit point totals were Doug Christie (18), Mike Bibby (16), Bobby Jackson (16), Keon Clark (12), Jim Jackson (11).); Game 3 of the conference semifinals, Mavericks won the series 4–3	
9	277	April 20, 1985	The Forum; Inglewood, California	Los Angeles Lakers	147–130	—	Phoenix Suns	Lakers' Kareem Abdul-Jabbar scored a game-high 24 points; Leading scorers; Lakers: Abdul-Jabbar (24), Bob McAdoo (22), Byron Scott (21), Mike McGee (20) (Note: Others with double-digit point totals were Magic Johnson (19), James Worthy (15), Michael Cooper (13).); Suns: Alvan Adams (23), Jay Humphries (21), Mike Sanders (20) (Note: Others with double-digit point totals were Maurice Lucas (13), Charles Pittman (12), Charles Jones (12), Rod Foster (10).); Game 2 of the conference semifinals, Lakers won the series 3–0	
9	277	May 3, 2019	Moda Center; Portland, Oregon	Portland Trail Blazers	140–137	4	Denver Nuggets	Trail Blazers' CJ McCollum scored a game-high 41 points; Leading scorers; Trail Blazers: McCollum (41), Damian Lillard (28) (Note: Others with double-digit point totals were Rodney Hood (19), Enes Kanter (18), Maurice Harkless (15).); Nuggets: Jamal Murray (34), Nikola Jokić (33), Will Barton (22) (Note: Others with double-digit point totals were Paul Millsap (17), Gary Harris (13), Malik Beasley (11).); Game 3 of the conference semifinals, Trail Blazers won the series 4–3	

== See also ==
- NBA records
