= Joe Ruklick =

American basketball player (1938–2020)

Personal information
- Born: August 3, 1938 Chicago, Illinois, U.S.
- Died: September 17, 2020 (aged 82) Morton Grove, Illinois, U.S.
- Listed height: 6 ft 9 in (2.06 m)
- Listed weight: 220 lb (100 kg)

Career information
- High school: Princeton (Princeton, Illinois)
- College: Northwestern (1956–1959)
- NBA draft: 1959: 2nd round, 9th overall pick
- Drafted by: Philadelphia Warriors
- Playing career: 1959–1962
- Position: Power forward / center
- Number: 17

Career history
- 1959–1962: Philadelphia Warriors

Career highlights
- Third-team All-American – AP, NABC (1959); First-team All-Big Ten (1959)

Career NBA statistics
- Points: 398 (3.5 ppg)
- Rebounds: 286 (2.5 rpg)
- Assists: 48 (0.4 apg)
- Stats at NBA.com
- Stats at Basketball Reference

Joseph Wayne Ruklick (/ˈrʌklɪk/ RUCK-lik; August 3, 1938 – September 17, 2020) was an American professional basketball player for the Philadelphia Warriors of the National Basketball Association (NBA). He played college basketball for the Northwestern Wildcats and was an All-American in 1959. Ruklick was selected by Philadelphia in the second round of the 1959 NBA draft. He was known for passing the ball for the assist on Warriors teammate Wilt Chamberlain's final score en route to his NBA record 100-point game.

== Early life ==
Ruklick was born in Chicago, but he moved to an orphanage in Princeton, Illinois, after his mother was diagnosed with tuberculosis when he was 11. He attended Princeton High School, leading the team to consecutive state tournaments in 1954 and 1955.

== College career ==
Ruklick attended Northwestern University in Evanston, Illinois. He played three seasons with the Wildcats, leading the team in both scoring and rebounds each year. Ruklick averaged 23 points and 13 rebounds as a senior in 1958–59, when he was named a third-team All-American by the Associated Press and National Association of Basketball Coaches. He finished with career averages of 19.9 points and 13.2 rebounds per game.

Ruklick guarded Wilt Chamberlain in his first collegiate game with Kansas in 1956. Chamberlain had 52 points and 31 rebounds, and his scoring total remains a Kansas single-game record. Ruklick countered with 22 points but fouled out with 9:30 remaining in the game. "I held him to 52", quipped Ruklick in 2002.

== Professional career ==
Ruklick was selected by the Philadelphia Warriors in the second round of the 1959 NBA draft with the ninth overall pick. In teammate Wilt Chamberlain's 100-point game, he got the assist for Wilt's 100th point and played eight minutes. Late in the game after Chamberlain had already scored 100, Ruklick missed two free throws, stating afterwards that he intentionally missed the second in hopes that Chamberlain might rebound it and get 102 points.

After Ruklick's third season with the Warriors, the team moved to San Francisco. Averaging only 3.5 points and eight minutes per game in his career as a backup to Chamberlain, he asked to be traded in order to play more. However, the team refused. According to Ruklick, owner Eddie Gottlieb told him, "We need you next year. Fans won't buy tickets if you have too many Negroes." Ruklick left the team over moral objections.

== Career statistics ==
Legend
GP	Games played	GS	Games started	MPG	Minutes per game
FG%	Field goal percentage	3P%	3-point field goal percentage	FT%	Free throw percentage
RPG	Rebounds per game	APG	Assists per game	SPG	Steals per game
BPG	Blocks per game	PPG	Points per game	**Bold**	Career high

=== Regular season ===
Year	Team	GP	MPG	FG%	FT%	RPG	APG	PPG
1959–60	Philadelphia Warriors	39	**9.8**	.**397**	.**722**	**3.5**	.**6**	**5.0**
1960–61	Philadelphia Warriors	29	7.7	.358	.615	2.1	.3	3.2
1961–62	Philadelphia Warriors	**46**	6.6	.327	.462	1.9	.3	2.3
Career		114	8.0	.366	.613	2.5	.4	3.5

=== Playoffs ===
Year	Team	GP	MPG	RPG	FG%	FT%	APG	PPG
1960	Philadelphia Warriors	**4**	3.8	.222	—	1.3	.0	1.0
1962	Philadelphia Warriors	2	**4.0**	.**250**	.**500**	**2.0**	**.3**	**1.5**
Career		6	3.8	.231	.500	1.5	.4	1.2

== Later years ==
After his NBA career, Ruklick worked in investment banking. He received a graduate degree from Northwestern University's Medill School of Journalism at the age of 50. He worked at newspapers including The Galesburg Register-Mail and later The Chicago Defender, where he was the only white among the African-American newspaper's 22-person editorial staff.

Ruklick lived in Evanston, and frequently attended Northwestern games while reporting for the Aurora Voice. He died of natural causes at 82 on September 17, 2020.
