= Cleveland Buckner =

American basketball player (1938–2006)

Personal information
- Born: August 17, 1938 Yazoo City, Mississippi
- Died: October 5, 2006 (aged 68) Jackson, Mississippi
- Listed height: 6 ft 9 in (2.06 m)
- Listed weight: 210 lb (95 kg)

Career information
- College: Jackson State (1958–1961)
- NBA draft: 1961: 6th round, 51st overall pick
- Drafted by: New York Knicks
- Playing career: 1961–1963
- Position: Power forward / center
- Number: 12

Career history
- 1961–1964: New York Knicks

Career statistics
- Points: 411 (6.0 ppg)
- Rebounds: 240 (3.5 rpg)
- Assists: 44 (0.6 apg)
- Stats at NBA.com
- Stats at Basketball Reference

Cleveland Buckner (August 17, 1938 – October 5, 2006) was an American basketball player. A forward-center from Yazoo City, Mississippi, he played collegiately for the Jackson State University and was selected by the New York Knicks in the 6th round (51st pick overall) of the 1961 NBA draft. He played 68 games for the Knicks in the NBA from 1961 to 1963.

After Knicks center Darrall Imhoff fouled out in the second half, Buckner was forced into duty against Wilt Chamberlain during Chamberlain's 100-point game on March 2, 1962. The rookie had a career-high 33 points on 16-of-26 in the field plus 8 rebounds in the historic contest. Starting center Phil Jordon was unavailable because of an injury.

== Career statistics ==
Legend
GP	Games played	GS	Games started	MPG	Minutes per game
FG%	Field goal percentage	3P%	3-point field goal percentage	FT%	Free throw percentage
RPG	Rebounds per game	APG	Assists per game	SPG	Steals per game
BPG	Blocks per game	PPG	Points per game	**Bold**	Career high

=== NBA ===
==== Regular season ====
Year	Team	GP	MPG	FG%	FT%	RPG	APG	PPG
1961–62	New York	**62**	**11.2**	.431	**.624**	**3.8**	.6	**6.4**
1962–63	New York	6	4.5	**.500**	.500	.7	**.8**	2.0
Career		68	10.6	.432	.620	3.5	.6	6.0
