= Dave Zinkoff =

American sports announcer (1910–1985)

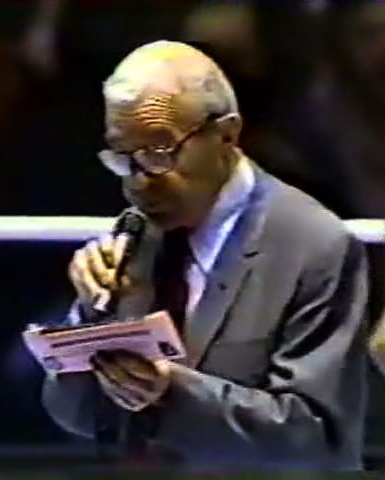
- Zinkoff in Philadelphia, taken June 1982.
- Born: May 15, 1910
- Died: December 25, 1985 (aged 75)
- Sports commentary career
- Team(s): Philadelphia 76ers Philadelphia Warriors
- Genre: Public Address Announcer
- Sport: NBA

Dave Zinkoff (May 15, 1910 – December 25, 1985) was a sports public address announcer. He announced for the Philadelphia Phillies at Shibe Park in the 1940s and at the Philadelphia Convention Hall for the Philadelphia Warriors, Philadelphia 76ers, and college boxing and wrestling teams from the 1950s to the early 1980s. Zinkoff was also one of the rotating group of ring announcers for the monthly World Wrestling Federation (now WWE) events at the Spectrum.

Zinkoff worked Wilt Chamberlain's 100-point game at Hershey Sports Arena on March 2, 1962.

Zinkoff died on December 25, 1985, following complications from heart surgery.

On March 25, 1986, the 76ers retired his microphone.

Dave Zinkoff was posthumously inducted into the Broadcast Pioneers of Philadelphia Hall of Fame on November 22, 2013.
