= List of NBA single-game scoring leaders =

This is a complete listing of National Basketball Association players who have scored 60 or more points in a regular season game.

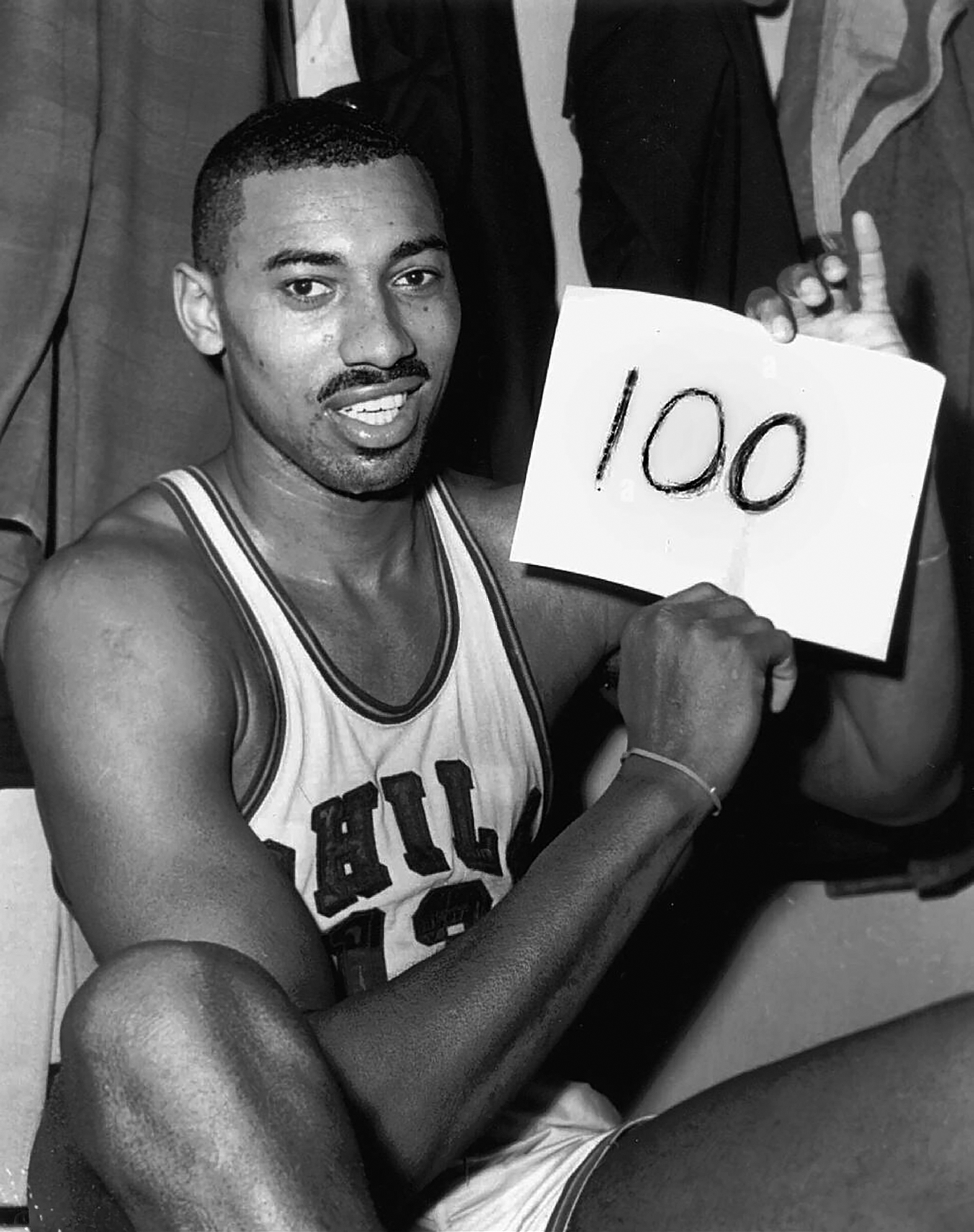
Wilt Chamberlain scored 100 points in 1962, which is the current NBA record.

This feat has been accomplished 93 times in NBA history by 38 different players, while just eleven players have joined the 70-point club, with three players having scored at least 80 points. Only 10 players have scored 60 or more points on more than one occasion: Wilt Chamberlain (32 times); Kobe Bryant (6 times); Damian Lillard (5 times); Michael Jordan and James Harden (4 times); Elgin Baylor and Luka Dončić (3 times); and Karl-Anthony Towns, Devin Booker, and Stephen Curry (2 times). Chamberlain holds the single-game scoring record, having scored 100 points in a game in 1962. The youngest player to score at least 60 points in a regular season game is Devin Booker (70 points; 20 years and 145 days), and the oldest is Bryant (60 points; 37 years and 234 days).

== Single-game leaders ==
Key
^	Denotes player who is currently active in the NBA
*	Denotes player who has been inducted into the Naismith Memorial Basketball Hall of Fame
§	1st time eligible for Hall of Fame in 2026
	Player's team lost the game

Rank	Points	Player	Date	Team	Opponent	Score	MP	FGM	FGA	3PM	3PA	FTM	FTA	Notes	Ref.
1	100	Wilt Chamberlain*	March 2, 1962	Philadelphia Warriors	New York Knicks	169–147	48	36	63	—	—	28	32	Set the still-standing (as of the 2025–26 season) single-game NBA records: points scored (100), points scored in a half (59), shots made (36), and shots attempted (63). Also set a then-record for points scored in a quarter (31) and free throws made in a game (28). It was the last of a four game streak in which Chamberlain scored 60 or more points in each one. The game, which wasn't televised, was played at Hershey Sports Arena in Hershey, Pennsylvania.	
2	83	Bam Adebayo^	March 10, 2026	Miami Heat	Washington Wizards	150–129	42	20	43	7	22	36	43	Set the record for most free throws made and attempted in a game. Made and attempted more free throws than the entire Wizards team (22/29)	
3	81	Kobe Bryant*	January 22, 2006	Los Angeles Lakers	Toronto Raptors	122–104	42	28	46	7	13	18	20	Outscored the Raptors 55–41 in the second half. Led Lakers from an 18-point deficit. Bryant was in the middle of a free throw scoring streak which came to an end at 62. Scored 28 of the Lakers' 31 points in the fourth quarter. Scored 19 consecutive Laker points between the end of the first half and the middle of the third quarter.	
4	78	Wilt Chamberlain* (2)	December 8, 1961	Philadelphia Warriors	Los Angeles Lakers	147–151	63	31	62	—	—	16	31	3 OT; set a then-record for most points in a game. Most points scored in a losing effort. Also recorded 43 rebounds.	
5	73	Wilt Chamberlain* (3)	January 13, 1962	Philadelphia Warriors	Chicago Packers	135–117	48	29	48	—	—	15	25	Set a then-record for points in a regulation game.	
5	73	Wilt Chamberlain* (4)	November 16, 1962	San Francisco Warriors	New York Knicks	127–111	48	29	43	—	—	15	19	Most points scored in a road game.	
5	73	David Thompson*	April 9, 1978	Denver Nuggets	Detroit Pistons	137–139	43	28	38	—	—	17	20	Last game of the season; George Gervin scored 63 on the same night to win the scoring title by a .07 margin.	
5	73	Luka Dončić^	January 26, 2024	Dallas Mavericks	Atlanta Hawks	148–143	45	25	33	8	13	15	16		
9	72	Wilt Chamberlain* (5)	November 3, 1962	San Francisco Warriors	Los Angeles Lakers	115–127	—	29	48	—	—	14	18		
10	71	Elgin Baylor*	November 15, 1960	Los Angeles Lakers	New York Knicks	123–108	45	28	48	—	—	15	18	Set a then-record for most points in a game.	
10	71	David Robinson*	April 24, 1994	San Antonio Spurs	Los Angeles Clippers	112–97	44	26	41	1	2	18	25	Last game of regular season to win a scoring title over Shaquille O'Neal.	
10	71	Donovan Mitchell^	January 2, 2023	Cleveland Cavaliers	Chicago Bulls	145–134	50	22	34	7	15	20	25	Scored 13 points in OT.	
10	71	Damian Lillard^	February 26, 2023	Portland Trail Blazers	Houston Rockets	131–114	39	22	38	13	22	14	14		
14	70	Wilt Chamberlain* (6)	March 10, 1963	San Francisco Warriors	Syracuse Nationals	148–163	48	27	38	—	—	16	22		
14	70	Devin Booker^	March 24, 2017	Phoenix Suns	Boston Celtics	120–130	45	21	40	4	11	24	26	Youngest player to score at least 60 points in a game.	
14	70	Joel Embiid^	January 22, 2024	Philadelphia 76ers	San Antonio Spurs	133–123	37	24	41	1	2	21	23		
17	69	Michael Jordan*	March 28, 1990	Chicago Bulls	Cleveland Cavaliers	117–113	50	23	37	2	6	21	23	Scored 8 points in OT. Also recorded a career-high 18 rebounds.	
18	68	Wilt Chamberlain* (7)	December 16, 1967	Philadelphia 76ers	Chicago Bulls	143–123	—	30	40	—	—	8	22		
18	68	Pete Maravich*	February 25, 1977	New Orleans Jazz	New York Knicks	124–107	43	26	43	—	—	16	19		
20	67	Wilt Chamberlain* (8)	March 9, 1961	Philadelphia Warriors	New York Knicks	135–126	—	27	37	—	—	13	17		
20	67	Wilt Chamberlain* (9)	February 17, 1962	Philadelphia Warriors	St. Louis Hawks	121–128	48	26	44	—	—	15	20		
20	67	Wilt Chamberlain* (10)	February 25, 1962	Philadelphia Warriors	New York Knicks	135–149	48	25	38	—	—	17	22		
20	67	Wilt Chamberlain* (11)	January 11, 1963	San Francisco Warriors	Los Angeles Lakers	129–134	—	28	47	—	—	11	17		
24	66	Wilt Chamberlain* (12)	February 9, 1969	Los Angeles Lakers	Phoenix Suns	134–116	48	29	35	—	—	8	18	Last time Chamberlain scored 60.	
25	65	Wilt Chamberlain* (13)	February 13, 1962	Philadelphia Warriors	Cincinnati Royals	132–152	48	24	40	—	—	17	30		
25	65	Wilt Chamberlain* (14)	February 27, 1962	Philadelphia Warriors	St. Louis Hawks	147–137	48	25	43	—	—	15	20		
25	65	Wilt Chamberlain* (15)	February 7, 1966	Philadelphia 76ers	Los Angeles Lakers	132–125	—	28	43	—	—	9	20		
25	65	Kobe Bryant* (2)	March 16, 2007	Los Angeles Lakers	Portland Trail Blazers	116–111	50	23	39	8	12	11	12	Scored basket that sent game in OT. Scored 9 in OT.	
29	64	Elgin Baylor* (2)	November 8, 1959	Minneapolis Lakers	Boston Celtics	136–115	—	25	47	—	—	14	19	Set a then-record for most points in a game.	
29	64	Rick Barry*	March 26, 1974	Golden State Warriors	Portland Trail Blazers	143–120	43	30	45	—	—	4	5		
29	64	Michael Jordan* (2)	January 16, 1993	Chicago Bulls	Orlando Magic	124–128	47	27	49	1	5	9	11	Scored 7 points in OT.	
29	64	Giannis Antetokounmpo^	December 13, 2023	Milwaukee Bucks	Indiana Pacers	140–126	37	20	28	0	3	24	32		
33	63	Joe Fulks*	February 10, 1949	Philadelphia Warriors	Indianapolis Jets	108–87	—	27	56	—	—	9	14	Pre-shot clock era; set a then-record for points in a game.	
33	63	Elgin Baylor* (3)	December 8, 1961	Los Angeles Lakers	Philadelphia Warriors	151–147	—	23	55	—	—	17	24	3 OT.	
33	63	Jerry West*	January 17, 1962	Los Angeles Lakers	New York Knicks	129–121	39	22	36	—	—	19	22		
33	63	Wilt Chamberlain* (16)	December 14, 1962	San Francisco Warriors	Los Angeles Lakers	118–120	—	24	41	—	—	15	20		
33	63	Wilt Chamberlain* (17)	November 26, 1964	San Francisco Warriors	Philadelphia 76ers	117–128	—	27	58	—	—	9	20		
33	63	George Gervin*	April 9, 1978	San Antonio Spurs	New Orleans Jazz	132–153	33	23	49	—	—	17	20	Scored a then-record 33 points in the second quarter. Lost game but won the scoring title on last game of the season over David Thompson.	
39	62	Wilt Chamberlain* (18)	January 14, 1962	Philadelphia Warriors	Boston Celtics	136–145	48	27	45	—	—	8	10		
39	62	Wilt Chamberlain* (19)	January 17, 1962	Philadelphia Warriors	St. Louis Hawks	136–130	53	24	48	—	—	14	20	OT; Game played at Detroit, Michigan.	
39	62	Wilt Chamberlain* (20)	January 21, 1962	Philadelphia Warriors	Syracuse Nationals	139–132	53	25	42	—	—	12	17	OT; Game played at Utica, New York.	
39	62	Wilt Chamberlain* (21)	January 29, 1963	San Francisco Warriors	New York Knicks	123–103	—	27	44	—	—	8	17		
39	62	Wilt Chamberlain* (22)	November 15, 1964	San Francisco Warriors	Cincinnati Royals	122–106	—	26	44	—	—	10	21		
39	62	Wilt Chamberlain* (23)	March 3, 1966	Philadelphia 76ers	San Francisco Warriors	135–125	—	26	39	—	—	10	19		
39	62	Tracy McGrady*	March 10, 2004	Orlando Magic	Washington Wizards	108–99	46	20	37	5	14	17	26		
39	62	Kobe Bryant* (3)	December 20, 2005	Los Angeles Lakers	Dallas Mavericks	112–90	33	18	31	4	10	22	25	Sat out the fourth quarter; outscored Dallas alone through three quarters, 62–61.	
39	62	Carmelo Anthony*	January 24, 2014	New York Knicks	Charlotte Bobcats	125–96	39	23	35	6	11	10	10	Anthony made a half-court buzzer-beater at the end of the first half.	
39	62	Stephen Curry^	January 3, 2021	Golden State Warriors	Portland Trail Blazers	137–122	36	18	31	8	16	18	19		
39	62	Karl-Anthony Towns^	January 22, 2024	Minnesota Timberwolves	Charlotte Hornets	125–128	38	21	35	10	15	10	14		
39	62	Devin Booker^ (2)	January 26, 2024	Phoenix Suns	Indiana Pacers	131–133	38	22	37	6	12	12	13		
51	61	George Mikan*	January 20, 1952	Minneapolis Lakers	Rochester Royals	91–81	—	22	45	—	—	17	21	2 OT; Mikan scored 67% of his team's points.	
51	61	Wilt Chamberlain* (24)	December 9, 1961	Philadelphia Warriors	Chicago Packers	135–113	48	28	48	—	—	5	10		
51	61	Wilt Chamberlain* (25)	February 22, 1962	Philadelphia Warriors	St. Louis Hawks	139–121	48	21	36	—	—	19	34		
51	61	Wilt Chamberlain* (26)	February 28, 1962	Philadelphia Warriors	Chicago Packers	128–119	48	24	46	—	—	13	17		
51	61	Wilt Chamberlain* (27)	November 21, 1962	San Francisco Warriors	Cincinnati Royals	139–143	—	27	52	—	—	7	15		
51	61	Wilt Chamberlain* (28)	December 11, 1962	San Francisco Warriors	Syracuse Nationals	136–124	—	27	57	—	—	7	11		
51	61	Wilt Chamberlain* (29)	December 18, 1962	San Francisco Warriors	St. Louis Hawks	130–110	—	26	53	—	—	9	14		
51	61	Michael Jordan* (3)	March 4, 1987	Chicago Bulls	Detroit Pistons	125–120	43	22	39	0	0	17	18	Scored 4 points in OT.	
51	61	Michael Jordan* (4)	April 16, 1987	Chicago Bulls	Atlanta Hawks	114–117	41	22	38	0	3	17	21	Part of a streak in which Jordan scored 50 or more points in three consecutive games to become the only player besides Wilt Chamberlain with a 3,000-point season.	
51	61	Karl Malone*	January 27, 1990	Utah Jazz	Milwaukee Bucks	144–96	33	21	26	0	0	19	23		
51	61	Shaquille O'Neal*	March 6, 2000	Los Angeles Lakers	Los Angeles Clippers	123–103	45	24	35	0	0	13	22	On his 28th birthday.	
51	61	Kobe Bryant* (4)	February 2, 2009	Los Angeles Lakers	New York Knicks	126–117	37	19	31	3	6	20	20		
51	61	LeBron James^	March 3, 2014	Miami Heat	Charlotte Bobcats	124–107	41	22	33	8	10	9	12	Made his first 8 three-pointers.	
51	61	James Harden^	January 23, 2019	Houston Rockets	New York Knicks	114–110	40	17	38	5	20	22	25		
51	61	James Harden^ (2)	March 22, 2019	Houston Rockets	San Antonio Spurs	111–105	37	19	34	9	13	14	17		
51	61	Damian Lillard^ (2)	January 20, 2020	Portland Trail Blazers	Golden State Warriors	129–124	45	17	37	11	20	16	16		
51	61	Damian Lillard^ (3)	August 11, 2020	Portland Trail Blazers	Dallas Mavericks	134–131	41	17	32	9	17	18	18		
51	61	Jalen Brunson^	March 29, 2024	New York Knicks	San Antonio Spurs	126–130	43	25	47	5	13	6	6		
51	61	Nikola Jokić^	April 1, 2025	Denver Nuggets	Minnesota Timberwolves	139–140	53	18	29	6	11	19	24	Scored 12 points in two overtime periods. Also had 10 rebounds and 10 assists, setting the record for highest-scoring triple-double in NBA history.	
70	60	Wilt Chamberlain* (30)	December 1, 1961	Philadelphia Warriors	Los Angeles Lakers	138–117	48	22	47	—	—	16	26		
70	60	Wilt Chamberlain* (31)	December 29, 1961	Philadelphia Warriors	Los Angeles Lakers	123–118	48	24	43	—	—	12	19	Chamberlain's seventh straight 50+ point game (an NBA record) and 13th straight 40+ point game (he would push this streak to 14 the next evening). Game played at Hershey Sports Arena in Hershey, Pennsylvania.	
70	60	Wilt Chamberlain* (32)	January 26, 1969	Los Angeles Lakers	Cincinnati Royals	126–113	—	22	36	—	—	16	24	Game played at Cleveland, Ohio.	
70	60	Bernard King*	December 25, 1984	New York Knicks	New Jersey Nets	114–120	41	19	30	0	0	22	26		
70	60	Larry Bird*	March 12, 1985	Boston Celtics	Atlanta Hawks	126–115	43	22	36	1	4	15	16	Scored last basket at the buzzer. Game played at Lakefront Arena in New Orleans, Louisiana.	
70	60	Tom Chambers	March 24, 1990	Phoenix Suns	Seattle SuperSonics	121–95	42	22	32	0	0	16	18		
70	60	Allen Iverson*	February 12, 2005	Philadelphia 76ers	Orlando Magic	112–99	42	17	36	2	5	24	27		
70	60	Gilbert Arenas	December 17, 2006	Washington Wizards	Los Angeles Lakers	147–141	49	17	32	5	12	21	27	Scored a then-record 16 points in OT.	
70	60	Kobe Bryant* (5)	March 22, 2007	Los Angeles Lakers	Memphis Grizzlies	121–119	45	20	37	3	7	17	18	3rd game of a four-game 50+ streak.	
70	60	Kobe Bryant* (6)	April 13, 2016	Los Angeles Lakers	Utah Jazz	101–96	42	22	50	6	21	10	12	Final game of Bryant's career. Oldest player to score 60.	
70	60	Klay Thompson^	December 5, 2016	Golden State Warriors	Indiana Pacers	142–106	29	21	33	8	14	10	11	Sat out the fourth quarter.	
70	60	James Harden^ (3)	January 30, 2018	Houston Rockets	Orlando Magic	114–107	46	19	30	5	14	17	18	Also had 10 rebounds and 11 assists, setting the previous record for highest-scoring triple-double in NBA history and the first player to record a triple-double while scoring at least 60 points.	
70	60	Kemba Walker^{§}	November 17, 2018	Charlotte Hornets	Philadelphia 76ers	119–122	45	21	34	6	14	12	12	Scored 2 points in OT.	
70	60	Damian Lillard^ (4)	November 8, 2019	Portland Trail Blazers	Brooklyn Nets	115–119	40	19	33	7	16	15	15		
70	60	James Harden^ (4)	November 30, 2019	Houston Rockets	Atlanta Hawks	158–111	31	16	24	8	14	20	23	Sat out the fourth quarter.	
70	60	Bradley Beal^	January 6, 2021	Washington Wizards	Philadelphia 76ers	136–141	38	20	35	7	10	13	15		
70	60	Jayson Tatum^	April 30, 2021	Boston Celtics	San Antonio Spurs	143–140	45	20	37	5	7	15	17	Scored 10 points in OT.	
70	60	Karl-Anthony Towns^ (2)	March 14, 2022	Minnesota Timberwolves	San Antonio Spurs	149–139	36	19	31	7	11	15	16		
70	60	Kyrie Irving^	March 15, 2022	Brooklyn Nets	Orlando Magic	150–108	35	20	31	8	12	12	13		
70	60	Luka Dončić^ (2)	December 27, 2022	Dallas Mavericks	New York Knicks	126–121	47	21	31	2	6	16	22	Scored 7 points in OT; also had 21 rebounds and 10 assists, tying the previous record for highest-scoring triple-double.	
70	60	Damian Lillard^ (5)	January 25, 2023	Portland Trail Blazers	Utah Jazz	134–124	40	21	29	9	15	9	10		
70	60	Stephen Curry^ (2)	February 3, 2024	Golden State Warriors	Atlanta Hawks	134–141	41	22	38	10	23	6	6	Scored 8 points in OT, joined Kobe Bryant as the only players in NBA history to score 60 after turning 35 years old.	
70	60	De'Aaron Fox^	November 15, 2024	Sacramento Kings	Minnesota Timberwolves	126–130	44	22	35	6	10	10	11		
70	60	Luka Dončić^ (3)	March 19, 2026	Los Angeles Lakers	Miami Heat	134–126	38	18	30	9	17	15	19		

== See also ==
- List of NBA regular season records
- List of NBA single-game playoff scoring leaders
- List of NCAA Division I men's basketball players with 60 or more points in a game
- List of basketball players who have scored 100 points in a single game
