= Harvey Pollack =

American basketball statistician and journalist

- Born: Herbert Harvey Pollack; March 9, 1922; Camden, New Jersey, U.S.
- Died: June 23, 2015 (aged 93); Philadelphia, Pennsylvania, U.S.
- Education: Temple University
- Spouse: Bea Pollack (1944–2002)
- Children: Ron and Linda

Herbert Harvey Pollack (March 9, 1922 – June 23, 2015) was an American sports statistician, a journalist of sports and entertainment, a publicist, and long term director of statistical information for the Philadelphia 76ers. At the time of his death, Pollack was the only person still working for the NBA since its inaugural 1946–47 season. Because of his proclivity to statistics, then Philadelphia Bulletin writer George Kiseda pinned the moniker of Super Stat on him in 1966.

== Early life ==
Pollack played basketball for Simon Gratz High School and graduated in 1943 from Temple University in Philadelphia.

== Career ==
He took his first job as a sportswriter for the Philadelphia Bulletin after serving as a soldier in the United States Army during World War II. In 1946–47 he started as the assistant publicity director for the Philadelphia Warriors of the Basketball Association of America, which later merged with the National Basketball League to form the National Basketball Association. Midway through the 1952–53 season, he became head of media relations for the Warriors. The Warriors were sold by owner Eddie Gottlieb (a founder of the NBA) and the team moved to San Francisco in 1962 (renamed Golden State Warriors), but Pollack remained in Philadelphia, where he worked for the NBA in various capacities until the 76ers were formed in 1963. Pollack then served as the media relations director of the Philadelphia 76ers until the 1987–88 season, when he assumed the duties of director of statistical information for the team.

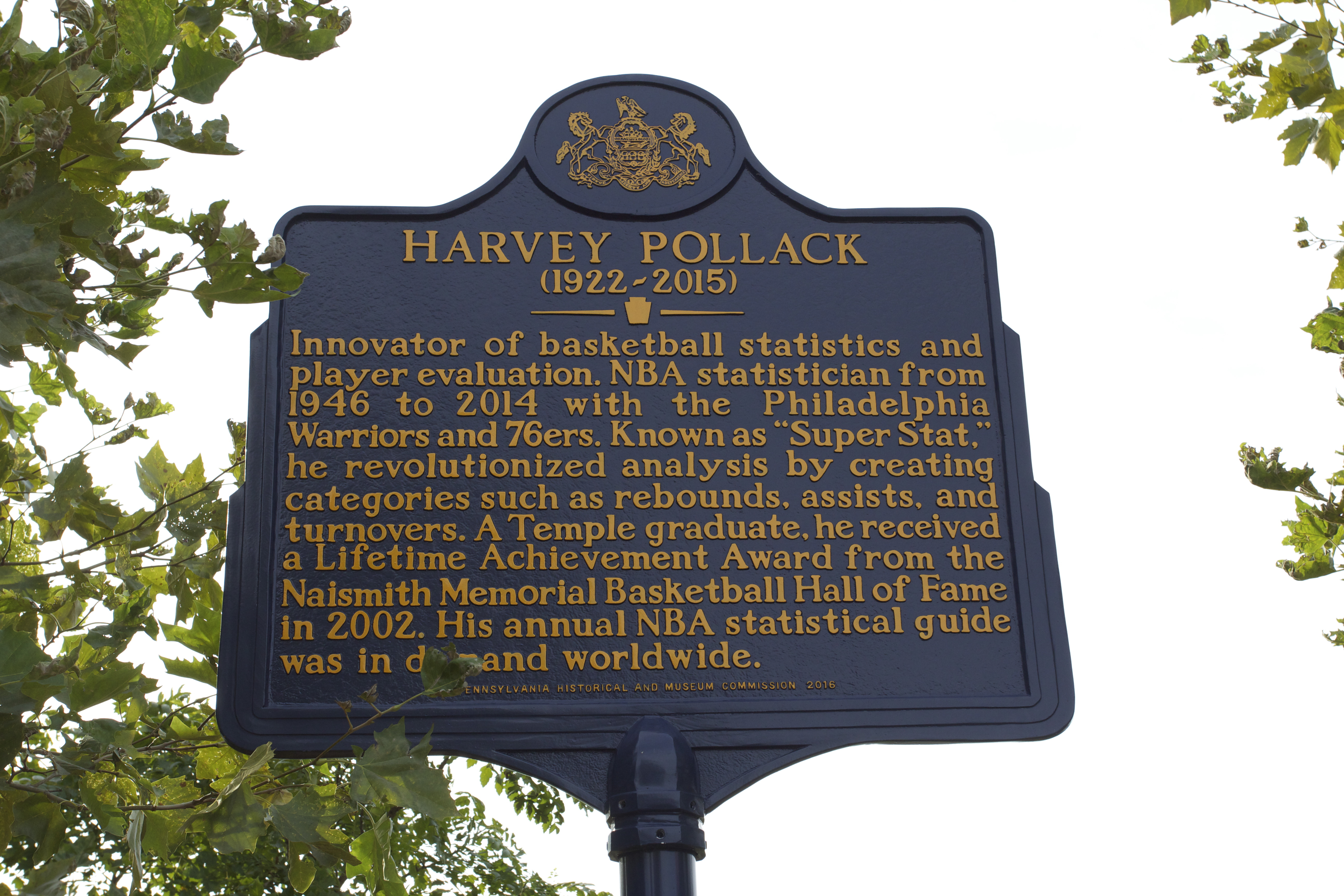
Historical marker for Pollack in South Philadelphia

Pollack holds the distinction of keeping score during Wilt Chamberlain's 100-point game, on March 2, 1962. According to Pollack, it was the "Busiest night of my career" as there was no press. Thus, he was the statistician and sole reporter for the game. Pollack made Chamberlain the sign which he holds in his famous post-game photo. Pollack was responsible for many stats that are now officially recorded by the NBA, such as blocked shots, and he was the first statistician to separate rebounds into offensive and defensive. Some believe he coined the term "triple-double," although others claim that it was coined by former Los Angeles Lakers public relations director, Bruce Jolesch.

During the Sixers’ offseason, Pollack analyzed all 1,230 play-by-play sheets from the previous season (every game of the regular season) to produce the Harvey Pollack's NBA Statistical Yearbook, a book of rare basketball information that took statistical analysis to a new level. It includes stats such as the shot distance of every field goal, who gets their shot blocked the most, and other creative categories like "working-man," which a player has to contribute to every category but no fouls or turnovers, and "trillionaire club" which is when a player plays in a game and has all zeros across their name. This NBA publication evolved from developing the first of its kind media guides for the Philadelphia 76ers in 1966–67 and then separated later into a new NBA publication to become among the most distinguished compilations in the sports business.

Pollack claimed that Wilt Chamberlain had not only a quadruple-double, but also a game where he recorded at least double digits in all five primary statistical categories. However, this has not been recorded in the books because the NBA had not officially adopted the statistics yet.

== Death ==
On June 23, 2015, Pollack died at the age of 93.

== Awards and honors ==
- Philadelphia Big 5 Hall of Fame, 1995. (category – Statistician)
- John Bunn Award, 2002.
- Pennsylvania Historical Marker, dedicated May 19, 2016 located curbside at South Philadelphia Sports Complex.

== See also ==
- Wilt Chamberlain's 100-point game
- Philadelphia 76ers
