= List of NBA single-season scoring leaders =

This list exhibits the National Basketball Association's top single-season scoring averages based on at least 70 games played or 1,400 points scored. The NBA began recording 3-point field goals during the 1979–80 NBA season. Of the top 30 single-season scoring averages in NBA history, Wilt Chamberlain leads with seven appearances followed by Michael Jordan with five appearances. During the 2023–24 NBA season, Joel Embiid averaged the 15th most points per game in a single season (34.7 PPG) but failed to meet the games played or the points scored minimum thresholds.

== List ==
^	Active NBA player
*	Inducted into the Naismith Memorial Basketball Hall of Fame

Statistics accurate as of the 2025–26 NBA season.

National Basketball Association single-season scoring leaders
Rank	Season	Player	Team	Games	FGM	3PM	FTM	Pts	PPG	P/36	P/75P
1	1961–62	Wilt Chamberlain*	Philadelphia Warriors	80	1,597	N/A	835	4,029	50.4	37.4	N/A
2	1962–63	Wilt Chamberlain*	San Francisco Warriors	80	1,463	N/A	660	3,586	44.8	33.9	N/A
3	1960–61	Wilt Chamberlain*	Philadelphia Warriors	79	1,251	N/A	531	3,033	38.4	29.8	N/A
4	1961–62	Elgin Baylor*	Los Angeles Lakers	48	680	N/A	476	1,836	38.3	31.0	N/A
5	1959–60	Wilt Chamberlain*	Philadelphia Warriors	72	1,065	N/A	577	2,707	37.6	29.2	N/A
6	1986–87	Michael Jordan*	Chicago Bulls	82	1,098	12	833	3,041	37.1	33.4	34.8
7	1963–64	Wilt Chamberlain*	San Francisco Warriors	80	1,204	N/A	540	2,948	36.9	28.8	N/A
8	2018–19	James Harden^	Houston Rockets	78	843	378	754	2,818	36.1	35.4	36.2
9	1966–67	Rick Barry*	San Francisco Warriors	78	1,011	N/A	753	2,775	35.6	31.5	N/A
10	2005–06	Kobe Bryant*	Los Angeles Lakers	80	978	180	696	2,832	35.4	31.1	34.2
11	1987–88	Michael Jordan*	Chicago Bulls	82	1,069	7	723	2,868	35.0	31.2	32.7
12	1971–72	Kareem Abdul-Jabbar*	Milwaukee Bucks	81	1,159	N/A	504	2,822	34.8	28.4	N/A
13	1960–61	Elgin Baylor*	Los Angeles Lakers	73	931	N/A	676	2,538	34.8	29.2	N/A
14	1964–65	Wilt Chamberlain*	S.F. Warriors / Phila. 76ers	73	1,063	N/A	408	2,534	34.7	27.6	N/A
15	1974–75	Bob McAdoo*	Buffalo Braves	82	1,095	N/A	641	2,831	34.5	28.8	26.7
16	2019–20	James Harden^	Houston Rockets	68	672	299	692	2,335	34.3	33.9	32.6
17 (tie)	1962–63	Elgin Baylor*	Los Angeles Lakers	80	1,029	N/A	661	2,719	34.0	29.0	N/A
17 (tie)	1972–73	Nate Archibald*	Kansas City-Omaha Kings	80	1,028	N/A	663	2,719	34.0	26.6	N/A
19	2023–24	Luka Dončić^	Dallas Mavericks	70	804	284	478	2,370	33.9	32.5	33.2
20	1989–90	Michael Jordan*	Chicago Bulls	82	1,034	92	593	2,753	33.6	31.0	32.0
21	1965–66	Wilt Chamberlain*	Philadelphia 76ers	79	1,074	N/A	501	2,649	33.5	25.5	N/A
22	2025–26	Luka Dončić^	Los Angeles Lakers	64	693	254	503	2,143	33.5	33.7	33.5
23	1979–80	George Gervin*	San Antonio Spurs	78	1,024	32	505	2,585	33.1	31.7	29.0
24	2022–23	Joel Embiid^	Philadelphia 76ers	66	728	66	661	2,183	33.1	34.4	35.6
25	2005–06	Allen Iverson*	Philadelphia 76ers	72	815	72	675	2,377	33.0	27.6	29.8
26	1984–85	Bernard King*	New York Knicks	55	691	1	426	1,809	32.9	31.6	31.7
27	2024–25	Shai Gilgeous-Alexander^	Oklahoma City Thunder	76	860	163	601	2,484	32.7	34.4	34.4
28	1992–93	Michael Jordan*	Chicago Bulls	78	992	81	476	2,541	32.6	29.8	32.3
29	1988–89	Michael Jordan*	Chicago Bulls	81	966	27	674	2,633	32.5	29.1	30.0
30	2022–23	Luka Dončić^	Dallas Mavericks	66	719	185	515	2,138	32.4	32.2	33.3

== See also ==
- NBA records
- National Basketball Association
