= Basketball scorekeeping =

Basketball unit of scoring accumulated by making field goals and free throws

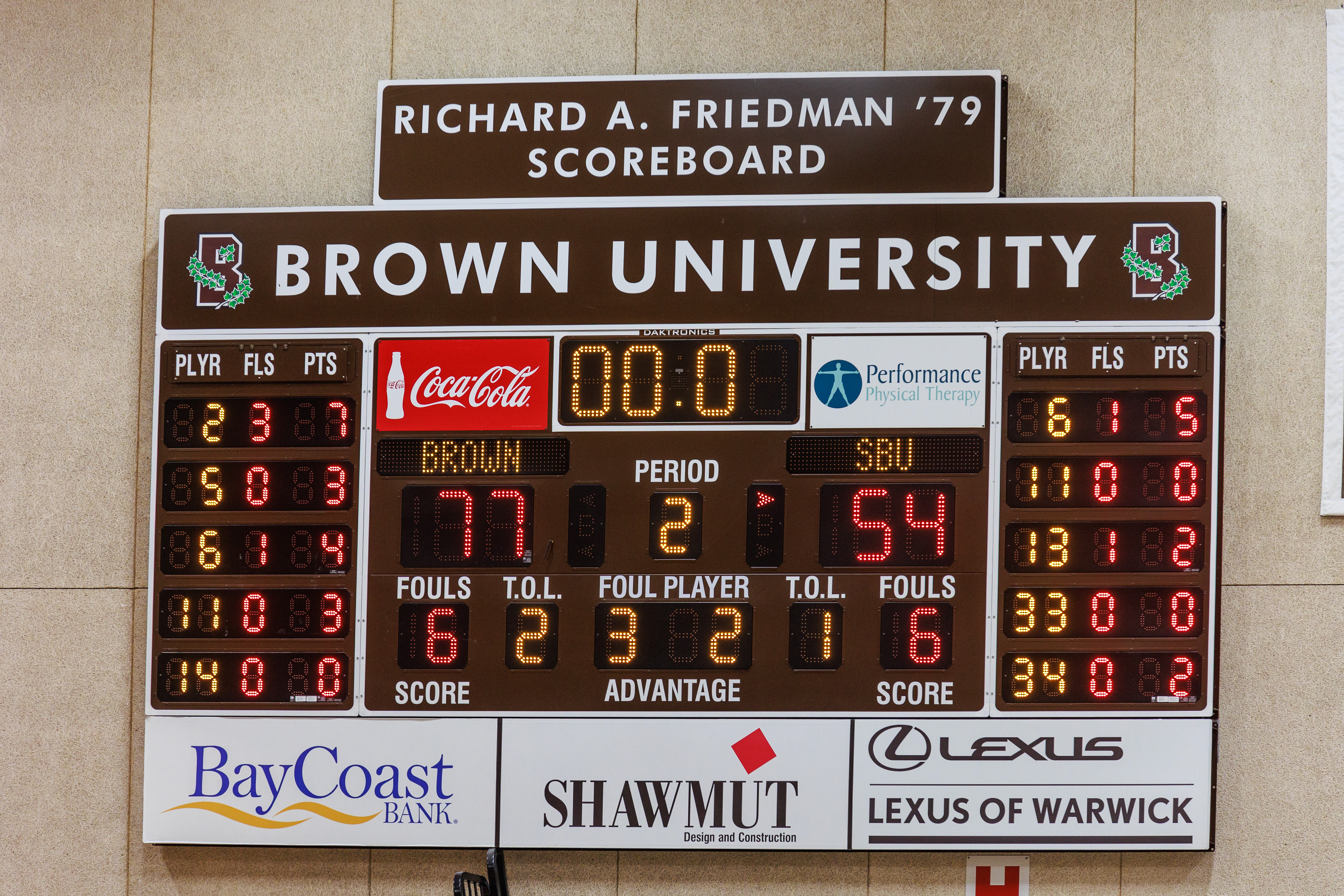
A basketball scoreboard

Basketball scorekeeping is the practice of tracking the statistics of a basketball game throughout the duration of play. Points serve as the measure of scorekeeping, determining the ongoing score, and are accumulated by making field goals and free throws. The team with the most points when the game ends is declared the winner.

== History ==
The first method of basketball scorekeeping came about in 1891 when James Naismith, the inventor of basketball, published his original 13 rules of the game. According to Rule 13, the winning team was decided by who scored the most number of goals. The very first basketball game ended with a score of 1–0, equating a single point to each goal. By 1896, the scoring system changed, representing a goal—now called a field goal—as 2 points, and free throws as 1 point.

Decades later, the three-pointer emerged into a professional league in 1961, awarding the shotmaker an apt 3 points, when the American Basketball League (ABL) painted the first official three-point line. After the ABL folded in 1962, years passed before the NBA finally gave it a one-year trial in 1979, which they ultimately kept. By 1986, the NCAA adopted it, but each major conference had different distances for their three-point lines. And a year later, in 1987, the National Federation of State High School Associations (NFHS) implemented the three-point line across high schools.

== Scoring ==
When a player successfully shoots the basketball through the opponents hoop, their team is awarded between 1 and 3 points. This point value is determined by three primary shot types:

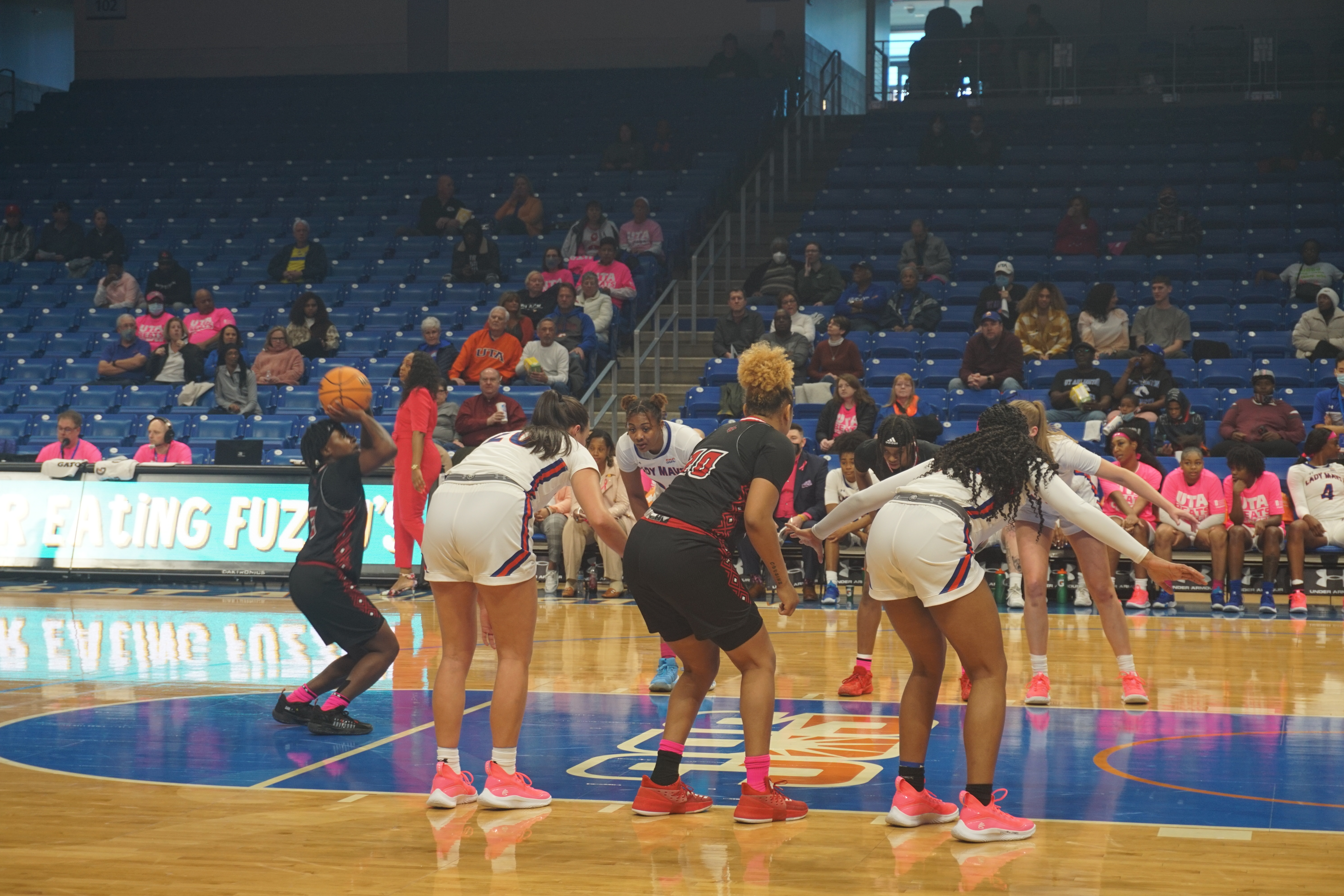
Free throw being shot by LA-Lafayette's Makayia Hallmon against the Texas-Arlington Mavericks in 2022

=== Free throw (or foul shot) ===
1 point is scored for a team when its player makes an unguarded shot from the free throw line. Free throws are awarded from shooting fouls, personal fouls that exceed the team foul limit, or technical and flagrant fouls committed against a player. Referees are solely responsible for calling fouls that can result in free throw opportunities, during which the game clock is stopped. It should also be noted that a free throw is not a field goal. Typically, free throws are tracked as a separate statistic in official scorekeeping.

=== Two-point field goal ===
2 points are scored for a team when its player makes a field goal from anywhere inside the three-point line. Layups, slam dunks, post shots, and mid-range jump shots all award the same number of points despite their differences in distance and difficulty. Unlike free throws, the game clock does not stop when a field goal is scored, as the ball is considered in play. Additionally, if the scoring player is fouled in the act of shooting, a made free throw turns the two-point field goal into a three-point play.

=== Three-point field goal ===
3 points are scored for a team when its player makes a field goal from anywhere outside the three-point line. This shot is worth an extra point compared to a standard two-point field goal because it is generally more difficult to convert and relatively less common to shoot. The shooter must not be touching the three-point line before when attempting the shot. They are often recorded as their own statistic on the scoresheet, while also contributing to the overall field goal totals. Additionally, if the scoring player is fouled in the act of shooting, a made free throw turns the field goal into a four-point play.

== Point records ==
- List of National Basketball Association career scoring leaders
- List of National Basketball Association season scoring leaders
- List of basketball players who have scored 100 points in a single game
- List of National Basketball Association players with most points in a game
- List of National Basketball Association players with 50 or more points in a playoff game
- List of National Basketball Association top individual scoring season averages
- List of National Basketball Association top rookie scoring averages
- List of highest-scoring NBA games
- List of National Basketball League (United States) scoring leaders
- List of NBA regular season records
- List of NBA post-season records
- List of WNBA regular season records
