= List of 1960–61 NBA season transactions =

These are the list of personnel changes in the NBA from the 1960–61 NBA season.

== Events ==
=== August 20, 1960 ===
- The Los Angeles Lakers hired Fred Schaus as head coach.

=== September 21, 1960 ===
- The New York Knicks sold Cal Ramsey to the Syracuse Nationals.

=== September 22, 1960 ===
- The St. Louis Hawks sold Dave Gambee to the Syracuse Nationals.

=== October 17, 1960 ===
- The Philadelphia Warriors traded Ernie Beck and Woody Sauldsberry to the St. Louis Hawks for Ed Conlin and cash.

=== October 24, 1960 ===
- The Los Angeles Lakers signed Gary Alcorn as a free agent.

=== November 14, 1960 ===
- The New York Knicks sold Mike Farmer to the Cincinnati Royals.

=== November 28, 1960 ===
- The St. Louis Hawks sold Ernie Beck to the Syracuse Nationals.
- The Cincinnati Royals sold Phil Rollins to the St. Louis Hawks.

=== December 15, 1960 ===
- The Los Angeles Lakers waived Gary Alcorn.
- The Detroit Pistons sold Ron Johnson to the Los Angeles Lakers.

=== December 17, 1960 ===
- The St. Louis Hawks sold Phil Rollins to the New York Knicks.

=== January 18, 1961 ===
- The Cincinnati Royals sold Phil Jordon to the New York Knicks.

=== February 23, 1961 ===
- The Chicago Packers hired Jim Pollard as head coach.

=== March 23, 1961 ===
- Neil Johnston resigns as head coach for Philadelphia Warriors.

=== April 26, 1961 ===
- The Chicago Packers drafted Dave Budd from the New York Knicks in the NBA expansion draft.
- The Chicago Packers drafted Barney Cable from the Syracuse Nationals in the NBA expansion draft.
- The Chicago Packers drafted Gene Conley from the Boston Celtics in the NBA expansion draft.
- The Chicago Packers drafted Ralph Davis from the Cincinnati Royals in the NBA expansion draft.
- The Chicago Packers drafted Archie Dees from the Detroit Pistons in the NBA expansion draft.
- The Chicago Packers drafted Andy Johnson from the Philadelphia Warriors in the NBA expansion draft.
- The Chicago Packers drafted Dave Piontek from the St. Louis Hawks in the NBA expansion draft.
- The Chicago Packers drafted Slick Leonard from the Los Angeles Lakers in the NBA expansion draft.

=== May 8, 1961 ===
- The New York Knicks waived Carl Braun.
- The New York Knicks fired Carl Braun as head coach.
- The New York Knicks hired Eddie Donovan as head coach.

=== May 14, 1961 ===
- The Boston Celtics signed Carl Braun as a free agent.

=== May 16, 1961 ===
- The New York Knicks sold Sam Stith to the Cincinnati Royals.
- The New York Knicks traded Bob McNeill and Charlie Tyra to the Chicago Packers for Dave Budd.
- The Chicago Packers sold Bob McNeill to the Philadelphia Warriors.
- The Cincinnati Royals sold Sam Stith to the New York Knicks.

=== May 31, 1961 ===
- The Philadelphia Warriors sold Vern Hatton to the Chicago Packers.

=== June 18, 1961 ===
- The St. Louis Hawks signed Joe Buckhalter as a free agent.

=== June 21, 1961 ===
- The Los Angeles Lakers signed Bob Sims as a free agent.

=== June 22, 1961 ===
- The Chicago Packers signed George Bon Salle as a free agent.

=== June 24, 1961 ===
- The St. Louis Hawks traded Horace Walker to the Chicago Packers for a 1962 4th round draft pick (Chico Vaughn was later selected).

=== June 25, 1961 ===
- The St. Louis Hawks traded Joe Buckhalter to the Cincinnati Royals for a future draft pick.
