= List of Sacramento Kings seasons =

Sacramento Kings of the National Basketball Association (NBA) were formerly known as the Rochester Royals, Cincinnati Royals, the Kansas City–Omaha Kings, and the Kansas City Kings. While the Kings were created first as a semiprofessional team in 1923 with the Rochester Seagrams, their professional roots began in 1945 with their arrival in the National Basketball League, where it won the title in their first season. They joined the Basketball Association of America in 1948, with the league soon rebranding itself as the NBA. The Royals won the NBA title in 1951. After reaching the postseason ten times in twelve professional seasons, they moved to Cincinnati in 1957. After fifteen years of mediocrity, they moved to Kansas City, Missouri in 1972, for which they played games in Kansas City and in Omaha, Nebraska. After thirteen years of mediocrity, they moved to Sacramento, California in 1986. An attempt to change ownership by way of selling the team and moving to Seattle failed in 2013. Vivek Ranadivé purchased the team later that year.

Starting in 2006–07 through the 2021–22 season the Kings set an NBA record in futility with 16 consecutive seasons without a playoff appearance, breaking old record of 15 playoff-less seasons that was compiled by the Los Angeles Clippers between 1976–77 and 1990–91. Every single one of those seasons saw them finish below .500, which is also a record. Since 1945, the team has reached the postseason just 33 times, with 11 in Sacramento and 10 in Rochester.

They have not reached the NBA Finals in 71 years (a record), have not reached a Conference finals in twenty seasons (tied for 5th for most seasons in history), and have not won a playoff series in eighteen seasons (tied for a record).

As one of the original eight NBA teams, they have the most losses in league history.

== Seasons ==
NBL champions	NBA champions	Conference champions	Division champions	Playoff berth	Play-in berth

Season	League	Conference	Finish	Division	Finish	Wins	Losses	Win%	GB	Playoffs	Awards	Head coach
Rochester Royals
1945–46	NBL	—	—	Eastern	2nd	24	10	.706	2	Won Division semifinals (Zollner Pistons) 3–1; Won NBL Championship (Red Skins) 3–0	Red Holzman (ROY)	Lester Harrison
1946–47	NBL	—	—	Eastern	1st	31	13	.705	—	Won Opening Round (Nationals) 3–1; Won Division semifinals (Zollner Pistons) 2–1; Lost NBL Championship (American Gears) 3–1	Bob Davies (MVP)	Lester Harrison
1947–48	NBL	—	—	Eastern	1st	44	16	.733	—	Won Opening Round (Zollner Pistons) 3–1; Won Division semifinals (Duffey Packers) 2–1; Lost NBL Championship (Lakers) 3–1		Lester Harrison
1948–49	BAA	—	—	Western	1st	45	15	.750	—	Won Division semifinals (Bombers) 2–0; Lost Division finals (Lakers) 2–0		Lester Harrison
1949–50	NBA	—	—	Central	2nd	51	17	.750	—	Lost Division semifinals (Pistons) 2–0		Lester Harrison
1950–51	NBA	—	—	Western	2nd	41	27	.603	3	Won Division semifinals (Pistons) 2–1; Won Division finals (Lakers) 3–1; Won NBA Finals (Knicks) 4–3		Lester Harrison
1951–52	NBA	—	—	Western	1st	41	25	.621	—	Won Division semifinals (Pistons) 2–0; Lost Division finals (Lakers) 3–1		Lester Harrison
1952–53	NBA	—	—	Western	2nd	44	26	.629	4	Lost Division semifinals (Pistons) 2–1		Lester Harrison
1953–54	NBA	—	—	Western	2nd	44	28	.611	2	Advanced round-robin Divisional Semifinals 2–1; Lost Division finals (Lakers) 2–1		Lester Harrison
1954–55	NBA	—	—	Western	3rd	29	43	.403	14	Lost Division semifinals (Lakers) 2–1		Lester Harrison
1955–56	NBA	—	—	Western	4th	31	41	.431	6		Maurice Stokes (ROY)	Bobby Wanzer
1956–57	NBA	—	—	Western	4th	31	41	.431	3			Bobby Wanzer
Cincinnati Royals
1957–58	NBA	—	—	Western	3rd	33	39	.458	8	Lost Division semifinals (Pistons) 2–0		Bobby Wanzer
1958–59	NBA	—	—	Western	4th	19	53	.264	30			Bobby Wanzer; Tom Marshall
1959–60	NBA	—	—	Western	4th	19	56	.253	27			Tom Marshall
1960–61	NBA	—	—	Western	4th	33	46	.418	18		Oscar Robertson (ROY, ASG MVP)	Charles Wolf
1961–62	NBA	—	—	Western	2nd	43	37	.538	11	Lost Division semifinals (Pistons) 3–1		Charles Wolf
1962–63	NBA	—	—	Eastern	3rd	42	38	.525	16	Won Division semifinals (Nationals) 3–2; Lost Division finals (Celtics) 4–3		Charles Wolf
1963–64	NBA	—	—	Eastern	2nd	55	25	.688	4	Won Division semifinals (76ers) 3–2; Lost Division finals (Celtics) 4–1	Oscar Robertson (MVP, ASG MVP); Jerry Lucas (ROY)	Jack McMahon
1964–65	NBA	—	—	Eastern	2nd	48	32	.600	14	Lost Division semifinals (76ers) 3–1	Jerry Lucas (ASG MVP)	Jack McMahon
1965–66	NBA	—	—	Eastern	3rd	45	35	.563	10	Lost Division semifinals (Celtics) 3–2	Adrian Smith (ASG MVP)	Jack McMahon
1966–67	NBA	—	—	Eastern	3rd	39	42	.481	29	Lost Division semifinals (76ers) 3–1		Jack McMahon
1967–68	NBA	—	—	Eastern	5th	39	43	.476	23			Ed Jucker
1968–69	NBA	—	—	Eastern	5th	41	41	.500	16		Oscar Robertson (ASG MVP)	Ed Jucker
1969–70	NBA	—	—	Eastern	5th	36	46	.439	24			Bob Cousy
1970–71	NBA	Eastern	6th	Central	3rd	33	49	.402	9			Bob Cousy
1971–72	NBA	Eastern	6th	Central	3rd	30	52	.366	8			Bob Cousy
Kansas City–Omaha Kings
1972–73	NBA	Western	7th	Midwest	4th	36	46	.439	24		Joe Axelson (EOY)	Bob Cousy
1973–74	NBA	Western	7th	Midwest	4th	33	49	.402	26			Bob Cousy; Draff Young; Phil Johnson
1974–75	NBA	Western	3rd	Midwest	2nd	44	38	.537	3	Lost conference semifinals (Bulls) 4–2	Phil Johnson (COY)	Phil Johnson
Kansas City Kings
1975–76	NBA	Western	8th	Midwest	3rd	31	51	.378	7			Phil Johnson
1976–77	NBA	Western	7th	Midwest	4th	40	42	.488	10			Phil Johnson
1977–78	NBA	Western	11th	Midwest	5th	31	51	.378	17			Phil Johnson; Larry Staverman
1978–79	NBA	Western	2nd	Midwest	1st	48	34	.585	—	Lost conference semifinals (Suns) 4–1	Phil Ford (ROY); Cotton Fitzsimmons (COY)	Cotton Fitzsimmons
1979–80	NBA	Western	5th	Midwest	2nd	47	35	.573	2	Lost First round (Suns) 2–1		Cotton Fitzsimmons
1980–81	NBA	Western	5th	Midwest	2nd	40	42	.488	12	Won First round (Trail Blazers) 2–1; Won conference semifinals (Suns) 4–3; Lost conference finals (Rockets) 4–1		Cotton Fitzsimmons
1981–82	NBA	Western	9th	Midwest	4th	30	52	.366	18			Cotton Fitzsimmons
1982–83	NBA	Western	7th	Midwest	2nd	45	37	.549	8			Cotton Fitzsimmons
1983–84	NBA	Western	8th	Midwest	3rd	38	44	.463	7	Lost First round (Lakers) 3–0		Cotton Fitzsimmons
1984–85	NBA	Western	11th	Midwest	6th	31	51	.378	21			Jack McKinney; Phil Johnson
Sacramento Kings
1985–86	NBA	Western	7th	Midwest	5th	37	45	.451	14	Lost First round (Rockets) 3–0		Phil Johnson
1986–87	NBA	Western	10th	Midwest	5th	29	53	.354	26			Phil Johnson; Jerry Reynolds
1987–88	NBA	Western	10th	Midwest	6th	24	58	.293	30			Bill Russell; Jerry Reynolds
1988–89	NBA	Western	10th	Pacific	6th	27	55	.329	30			Jerry Reynolds
1989–90	NBA	Western	12th	Pacific	7th	23	59	.280	40			Jerry Reynolds; Dick Motta
1990–91	NBA	Western	13th	Pacific	7th	25	57	.305	38			Dick Motta
1991–92	NBA	Western	10th	Pacific	7th	29	53	.354	28			Dick Motta; Rex Hughes
1992–93	NBA	Western	11th	Pacific	7th	25	57	.305	37			Garry St. Jean
1993–94	NBA	Western	10th	Pacific	6th	28	54	.341	35			Garry St. Jean
1994–95	NBA	Western	9th	Pacific	5th	39	43	.476	20		Mitch Richmond (ASG MVP)	Garry St. Jean
1995–96	NBA	Western	8th	Pacific	5th	39	43	.476	25	Lost First round (SuperSonics) 3–1		Garry St. Jean
1996–97	NBA	Western	9th	Pacific	6th	34	48	.415	23			Garry St. Jean; Eddie Jordan
1997–98	NBA	Western	9th	Pacific	5th	27	55	.329	34			Eddie Jordan
1998–99	NBA	Western	6th	Pacific	3rd	27	23	.540	8	Lost First round (Jazz) 3–2	Geoff Petrie (EOY)	Rick Adelman
1999–00	NBA	Western	8th	Pacific	5th	44	38	.537	23	Lost First round (Lakers) 3–2	Vlade Divac (JWKC)	Rick Adelman
2000–01	NBA	Western	3rd	Pacific	2nd	55	27	.672	1	Won First round (Suns) 3–1; Lost conference semifinals (Lakers) 4–0	Geoff Petrie (EOY)	Rick Adelman
2001–02	NBA	Western	1st	Pacific	1st	61	21	.744	—	Won First round (Jazz) 3–1; Won conference semifinals (Mavericks) 4–1; Lost conference finals (Lakers) 4–3		Rick Adelman
2002–03	NBA	Western	2nd	Pacific	1st	59	23	.720	—	Won First round (Jazz) 4–1; Lost conference semifinals (Mavericks) 4–3	Bobby Jackson (SMOY)	Rick Adelman
2003–04	NBA	Western	4th	Pacific	2nd	55	27	.672	1	Won First round (Mavericks) 4–1; Lost conference semifinals (Timberwolves) 4–3		Rick Adelman
2004–05	NBA	Western	6th	Pacific	2nd	50	32	.610	12	Lost First round (SuperSonics) 4–1		Rick Adelman
2005–06	NBA	Western	8th	Pacific	4th	44	38	.537	10	Lost First round (Spurs) 4–2		Rick Adelman
2006–07	NBA	Western	11th	Pacific	5th	33	49	.402	28			Eric Musselman
2007–08	NBA	Western	11th	Pacific	4th	38	44	.463	19			Reggie Theus
2008–09	NBA	Western	15th	Pacific	5th	17	65	.207	48			Reggie Theus; Kenny Natt
2009–10	NBA	Western	14th	Pacific	5th	25	57	.305	32		Tyreke Evans (ROY)	Paul Westphal
2010–11	NBA	Western	14th	Pacific	5th	24	58	.293	33			Paul Westphal
2011–12	NBA	Western	14th	Pacific	5th	22	44	.333	19			Paul Westphal; Keith Smart
2012–13	NBA	Western	13th	Pacific	4th	28	54	.341	28			Keith Smart
2013–14	NBA	Western	13th	Pacific	4th	28	54	.341	29			Michael Malone
2014–15	NBA	Western	13th	Pacific	4th	29	53	.354	38			Michael Malone; Tyrone Corbin; George Karl
2015–16	NBA	Western	10th	Pacific	3rd	33	49	.402	40			George Karl
2016–17	NBA	Western	12th	Pacific	3rd	32	50	.390	35			Dave Joerger
2017–18	NBA	Western	12th	Pacific	4th	27	55	.329	31			Dave Joerger
2018–19	NBA	Western	9th	Pacific	3rd	39	43	.476	18			Dave Joerger
2019–20	NBA	Western	12th	Pacific	4th	31	41	.431	22			Luke Walton
2020–21	NBA	Western	12th	Pacific	5th	31	41	.431	21			Luke Walton
2021–22	NBA	Western	12th	Pacific	5th	30	52	.366	34			Luke Walton; Alvin Gentry
2022–23	NBA	Western	3rd	Pacific	1st	48	34	.585	—	Lost First round (Warriors) 4–3	Mike Brown (COY); Monte McNair (EOY)	Mike Brown
2023–24	NBA	Western	9th	Pacific	4th	46	36	.561	5			Mike Brown
2024–25	NBA	Western	10th (Note: Fell to the 10th seed after losing to the Dallas Mavericks in the NBA play-in tournament.)	Pacific	4th	40	42	.488	10			Mike Brown; Doug Christie
2025–26	NBA	Western	14th	Pacific	5th	22	60	.268	31			Doug Christie

== All-time records ==
=== NBA records ===
Statistic	Wins	Losses	Win%
Regular season record (1948–present)	2,800	3,359	.455
Post-season record (1948–present)	83	111	.428
All-time regular and post-season record	2,893	3,470	.455

=== NBL records ===
Statistic	Wins	Losses	Win%
Regular season record (1945–1948)	99	39	.717
Post-season record (1945–1948)	18	11	.621
All-time regular and post-season record	117	50	.701
