= List of 1962–63 NBA season transactions =

These are the list of personnel changes in the NBA from the 1962–63 NBA season.

== Events ==
=== July 13, 1962 ===
- The Cincinnati Royals traded Larry Staverman to the Chicago Zephyrs for Dave Piontek. Staverman played in the ABL in between.

=== August 29, 1962 ===
- The New York Knicks traded Darrall Imhoff and cash to the Detroit Pistons for Gene Shue.

=== September 5, 1962 ===
- The Syracuse Nationals sold Dick Barnett to the Los Angeles Lakers.

=== September 10, 1962 ===
- The Chicago Zephyrs traded Gene Conley to the New York Knicks for Phil Jordon and Cliff Luyk.

=== September 11, 1962 ===
- The Chicago Zephyrs signed Johnny Cox as a free agent.

=== September 14, 1962 ===
- The Los Angeles Lakers traded Tom Hawkins to the Cincinnati Royals for a 1963 2nd round draft pick (Jim King was later selected).

=== September 19, 1962 ===
- The Detroit Pistons sold George Lee to the San Francisco Warriors.

=== October 7, 1962 ===
- The St. Louis Hawks traded Charlie Hardnett to the Chicago Zephyrs for Phil Jordon.

=== October 12, 1962 ===
- The Cincinnati Royals sold Bevo Nordmann to the St. Louis Hawks.

=== October 18, 1962 ===
- The Boston Celtics sold Gary Phillips to the San Francisco Warriors.

=== November 19, 1962 ===
- The St. Louis Hawks traded Nick Mantis to the Chicago Zephyrs for a future 2nd round draft pick.

=== December 5, 1962 ===
- The San Francisco Warriors traded Tom Gola to the New York Knicks for Willie Naulls and Kenny Sears.

=== December 28, 1962 ===
- The Chicago Zephyrs fired Jack McMahon as head coach.
- The Chicago Zephyrs hired Slick Leonard as head coach.

=== January ?, 1963 ===
- The Chicago Zephyrs signed Maury King as a free agent.

=== January 1, 1963 ===
- The New York Knicks signed Bevo Nordmann as a free agent.

=== January 22, 1963 ===
- The Boston Celtics sold Jack Foley to the New York Knicks.

=== January 30, 1963 ===
- The Chicago Zephyrs traded Woody Sauldsberry to the St. Louis Hawks for Barney Cable.

=== February 1, 1963 ===
- The San Francisco Warriors signed Fred LaCour as a free agent.

=== April 13, 1963 ===
- Dick McGuire resigns as head coach for Detroit Pistons.

=== May 21, 1963 ===
- Charles Wolf resigns as head coach for Cincinnati Royals.
- The Detroit Pistons hire Charles Wolf as head coach.

=== June 18, 1963 ===
- The Cincinnati Royals hire Jack McMahon as head coach.
