= List of NBA career playoff free throw scoring leaders =

This article provides two lists:

A list of National Basketball Association players by total career Playoffs free throws made.

A progressive list of playoffs free throws made leaders showing how the record has increased through the years.

== Free throw scoring leaders ==
This article provides a list of National Basketball Association players by total career Playoffs free throws made.

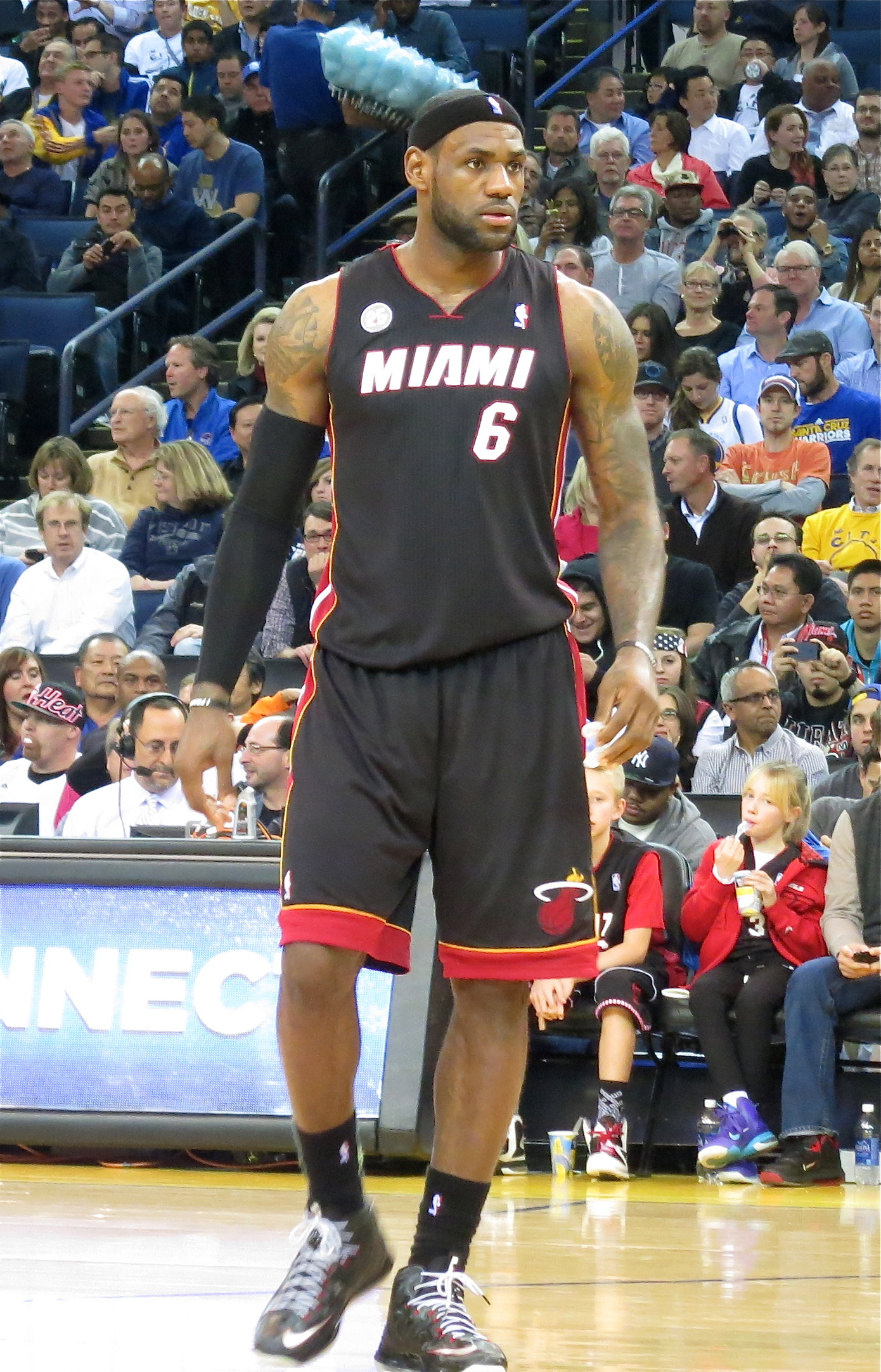
LeBron James has made the most free throws in NBA playoffs history.

^	Active NBA player
*	Inducted into the Naismith Memorial Basketball Hall of Fame

Statistics accurate as of the 2026 NBA playoffs.

Rank	Player	Position(s)	Playoff team(s) played for (years)	Total free throws made	Total free throws attempted	Free throw percentage	Free throws made per game
1	LeBron James^	SF	Cleveland Cavaliers (2003–2010, 2015–2018); Miami Heat (2011–2014); Los Angeles Lakers (2020–2021, 2023–2026)	1,914	2,582	.741	6.34
2	Michael Jordan*	SG	Chicago Bulls (1984–1993, 1995–1998)	1,463	1,766	.828	8.17
3	Kobe Bryant*	SG	Los Angeles Lakers (1997–2004, 2006–2012)	1,320	1,617	.816	6.00
4	Karl Malone*	PF	Utah Jazz (1986–2003); Los Angeles Lakers (2004)	1,269	1,725	.736	6.58
5	Kevin Durant^	SF/PF	Oklahoma City Thunder (2010–2014, 2016); Golden State Warriors (2017–2019); Brooklyn Nets (2021–2022); Phoenix Suns (2023–2024); Houston Rockets (2026)	1,259	1,450	.868	7.36
6	James Harden^	SG/PG	Oklahoma City Thunder (2010–2012); Houston Rockets (2013–2020); Brooklyn Nets (2021); Philadelphia 76ers (2022–2023); Los Angeles Clippers (2024–2025); Cleveland Cavaliers (2026)	1,218	1,407	.866	6.38
7	Tim Duncan*	PF/C	San Antonio Spurs (1998–1999, 2001–2016)	1,217	1,766	.689	4.85
8	Jerry West*	PG/SG	Los Angeles Lakers (1961–1970, 1972–1974)	1,213	1,506	.805	7.93
9	Shaquille O'Neal*	C	Orlando Magic (1994–1996); Los Angeles Lakers (1997–2004); Miami Heat (2005–2007); Phoenix Suns (2008); Cleveland Cavaliers (2010); Boston Celtics (2011)	1,168	2,317	.504	5.41
10	Dirk Nowitzki*	PF	Dallas Mavericks (2001–2012, 2014–2016)	1,074	1,204	.892	7.41
11	Magic Johnson*	PG	Los Angeles Lakers (1980–1991, 1996)	1,068	1,274	.838	5.62
12	Kareem Abdul-Jabbar*	C	Milwaukee Bucks (1970–1974); Los Angeles Lakers (1977–1989)	1,050	1,419	.740	4.43
13	Dwyane Wade*	SG	Miami Heat (2004–2007, 2009–2014, 2016, 2018); Chicago Bulls (2017)	951	1,220	.780	5.37
14	Larry Bird*	SF/PF	Boston Celtics (1980–1988, 1990–1992)	901	1,012	.890	5.49
15	John Havlicek*	SF	Boston Celtics (1963–1969, 1972–1977)	874	1,046	.836	5.08
16	Paul Pierce*	SF	Boston Celtics (2002–2005, 2008–2013); Brooklyn Nets (2014); Washington Wizards (2015); Los Angeles Clippers (2016–2017)	860	1,036	.830	5.06
17	Elgin Baylor*	SF	Minneapolis/Los Angeles Lakers (1959–1970)	847	1,101	.769	6.32
18	Manu Ginóbili*	SG	San Antonio Spurs (2003–2008, 2010–2018)	818	1,001	.817	3.75
19	Chauncey Billups*	PG	Minnesota Timberwolves (2001–2002); Detroit Pistons (2003–2008); Denver Nuggets (2009–2010); New York Knicks (2011); Los Angeles Clippers (2013)	785	892	.880	5.38
20	Scottie Pippen*	SF	Chicago Bulls (1988–1998); Houston Rockets (1999); Portland Trail Blazers (2000–2003)	772	1,067	.724	3.71
21	Reggie Miller*	SG	Indiana Pacers (1990–1996, 1998–2005)	770	862	.893	5.35
22	Kevin McHale*	PF	Boston Celtics (1981–1993)	766	972	.788	4.53
23	Wilt Chamberlain*	C	Philadelphia/San Francisco Warriors (1960–1962, 1964); Philadelphia 76ers (1965–1968); Los Angeles Lakers (1969–1973)	757	1,627	.465	4.73
24	Dennis Johnson*	PG	Seattle SuperSonics (1978–1980); Phoenix Suns (1981–1983); Boston Celtics (1984–1990)	756	943	.802	4.20
25	Charles Barkley*	PF	Philadelphia 76ers (1985–1987, 1989–1991); Phoenix Suns (1993–1996); Houston Rockets (1997–1999)	751	1,048	.717	6.11
Rank	Player	Position(s)	Playoff team(s) played for (years)	Total free throws made	Total free throws attempted	Free throw percentage	Free throws made per game

== Progressive list of playoff free throw scoring leaders ==
This is a progressive list of free throw scoring leaders showing how the record increased through the years.

Statistics accurate as of the 2026 NBA playoffs.

^	Active NBA player
*	Inducted into the Naismith Memorial Basketball Hall of Fame

Team abbreviationsTeam(s) listed is the one player was on when he established the record.
BAL	Baltimore Bullets	DET	Detroit Pistons	NYK	New York Knicks	POR	Portland Trail Blazers	SYR	Syracuse Nationals
BOS	Boston Celtics	HOU	Houston Rockets	OKC	Oklahoma City Thunder	ROC	Rochester Royals	TOR	Toronto Raptors
CHI	Chicago Bulls	LAL	Los Angeles Lakers	ORL	Orlando Magic	SAS	San Antonio Spurs	UTA	Utah Jazz
CIN	Cincinnati Royals	MIA	Miami Heat	PHI	Philadelphia 76ers	SEA	Seattle SuperSonics	WAS	Washington Wizards
CLE	Cleveland Cavaliers	MIL	Milwaukee Bucks	PHO	Phoenix Suns	SFW	San Francisco Warriors	WSB	Washington Bullets
DAL	Dallas Mavericks	MNL	Minneapolis Lakers	PHW	Philadelphia Warriors	STL	St. Louis Hawks		

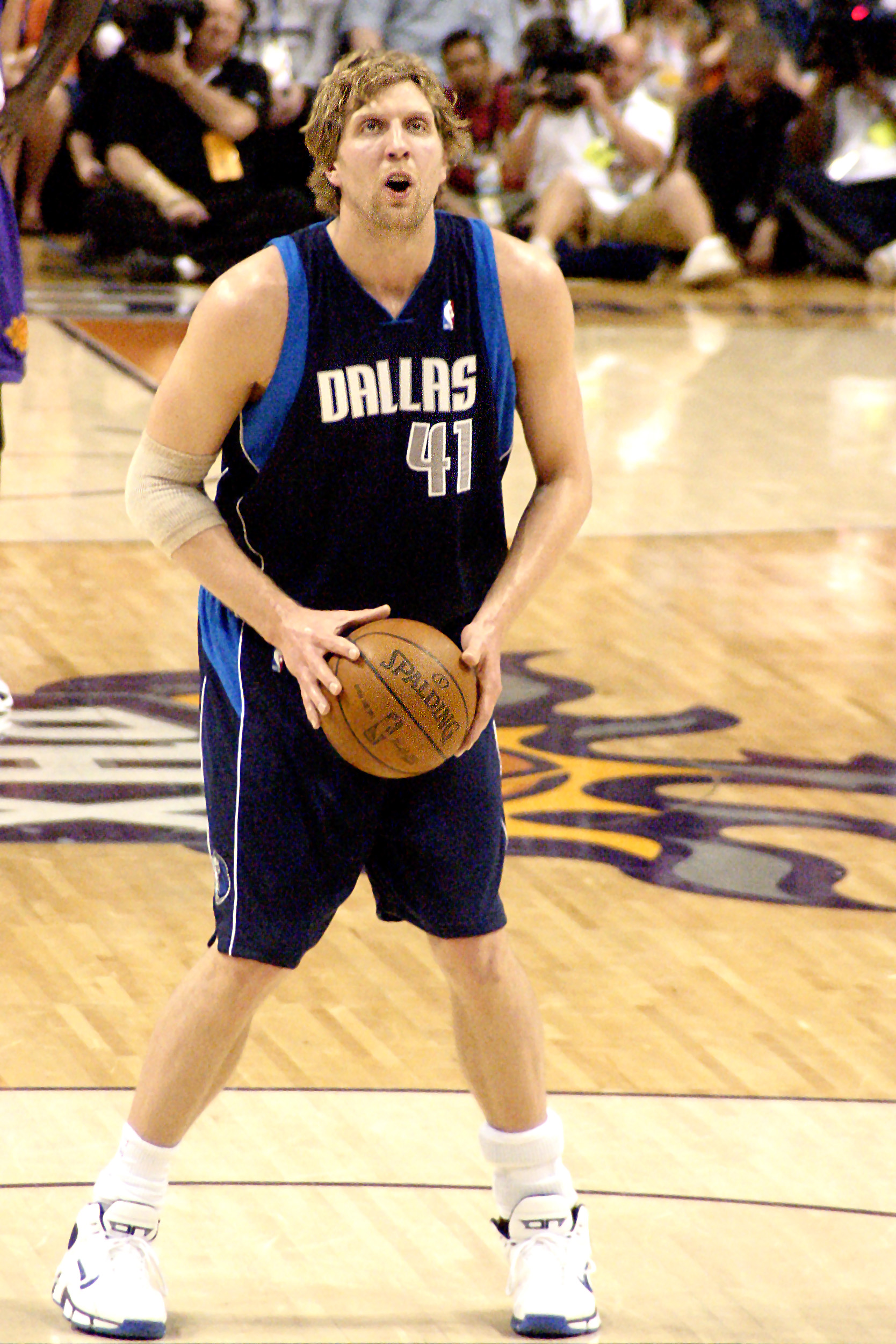
Dirk Nowitzki holds the record for the highest free-throw percentage in single playoffs.

Playoff free throw scoring leader at the end of every season
Season	Year-by-year leader	FT	Active player leader	FT	Career record	FT	Single-season record	FT	Season
1946–47	Joe Fulks*PHW	74	Joe Fulks*PHW	74	Joe Fulks*PHW	74	Joe Fulks*PHW	74	1946–47
1947–48	Joe Fulks*PHW	98	Joe Fulks*PHW	172	Joe Fulks*PHW	172	Joe Fulks*PHW	98	1947–48
1948–49	George Mikan*MNL	97	Joe Fulks*PHW	172	Joe Fulks*PHW	172	Joe Fulks*PHW	98	1948–49
1949–50	George Mikan*MNL	134	George Mikan*MNL	231	George Mikan*MNL	231	George Mikan*MNL	134	1949–50
1950–51	Arnie Risen*ROC	87	George Mikan*MNL	275	George Mikan*MNL	275	George Mikan*MNL	134	1950–51
1951–52	George Mikan*MNL	109	George Mikan*MNL	384	George Mikan*MNL	384	George Mikan*MNL	134	1951–52
1952–53	George Mikan*MNL	82	George Mikan*MNL	466	George Mikan*MNL	466	George Mikan*MNL	134	1952–53
1953–54	Dolph Schayes*SYR	80	George Mikan*MNL	544	George Mikan*MNL	544	George Mikan*MNL	134	1953–54
1954–55	Dolph Schayes*SYR	89	Dolph Schayes*SYR	362	George Mikan*MNL	544	George Mikan*MNL	134	1954–55
1955–56	Paul Arizin*PHW	83	George Mikan*MNL	554	George Mikan*MNL	554	George Mikan*MNL	134	1955–56
1956–57	Bob Pettit*STL	102	Dolph Schayes*SYR	484	George Mikan*MNL	554	George Mikan*MNL	134	1956–57
1957–58	Bob Pettit*STL	86	Dolph Schayes*SYR	514	George Mikan*MNL	554	George Mikan*MNL	134	1957–58
1958–59	Dolph Schayes*SYR	98	Dolph Schayes*SYR	612	Dolph Schayes*SYR	612	George Mikan*MNL	134	1958–59
1959–60	Bob Pettit*STL	107	Dolph Schayes*SYR	640	Dolph Schayes*SYR	640	George Mikan*MNL	134	1959–60
1960–61	Elgin Baylor*LAL	117	Dolph Schayes*SYR	703	Dolph Schayes*SYR	703	George Mikan*MNL	134	1960–61
1961–62	Elgin Baylor*LAL	130	Dolph Schayes*SYR	712	Dolph Schayes*SYR	712	George Mikan*MNL	134	1961–62
1962–63	Oscar Robertson*CIN	133	Dolph Schayes*SYR	723	Dolph Schayes*SYR	723	George Mikan*MNL	134	1962–63
1963–64	Oscar Robertson*CIN	109	Dolph Schayes*SYR	723	Dolph Schayes*SYR	723	George Mikan*MNL	134	1963–64
1964–65	Jerry West*LAL	137	Bob Pettit*STL	708	Dolph Schayes*SYR	723	Jerry West*LAL	137	1964–65
1965–66	Sam Jones*BOS	114	Elgin Baylor*LAL	633	Dolph Schayes*SYR	723	Jerry West*LAL	137	1965–66
1966–67	Rick Barry*SFW	127	Elgin Baylor*LAL	648	Dolph Schayes*SYR	723	Jerry West*LAL	137	1966–67
1967–68	Jerry West*LAL	132	Elgin Baylor*LAL	724	Elgin Baylor*LAL	724	Jerry West*LAL	137	1967–68
1968–69	Jerry West*LAL	164	Jerry West*LAL	856	Jerry West*LAL	856	Jerry West*LAL	164	1968–69
1969–70	Jerry West*LAL	170	Jerry West*LAL	1,026	Jerry West*LAL	1,026	Jerry West*LAL	170	1969–70
1970–71	Earl Monroe*BAL	107	Jerry West*LAL	1,026	Jerry West*LAL	1,026	Jerry West*LAL	170	1970–71
1971–72	Gail Goodrich*LAL	97	Jerry West*LAL	1,114	Jerry West*LAL	1,114	Jerry West*LAL	170	1971–72
1972–73	Jerry West*LAL	99	Jerry West*LAL	1,213	Jerry West*LAL	1,213	Jerry West*LAL	170	1972–73
1973–74	John Havlicek*BOS	89	Jerry West*LAL	1,213	Jerry West*LAL	1,213	Jerry West*LAL	170	1973–74
1974–75	Phil Chenier*WSB	102	John Havlicek*BOS	795	Jerry West*LAL	1,213	Jerry West*LAL	170	1974–75
1975–76	Jo Jo White*BOS	78	John Havlicek*BOS	833	Jerry West*LAL	1,213	Jerry West*LAL	170	1975–76
1976–77	Julius Erving*PHI	110	John Havlicek*BOS	874	Jerry West*LAL	1,213	Jerry West*LAL	170	1976–77
1977–78	Dennis Johnson*SEA	112	John Havlicek*BOS	874	Jerry West*LAL	1,213	Jerry West*LAL	170	1977–78
1978–79	Bob Dandridge*MIL	91	Elvin Hayes*WSB	412	Jerry West*LAL	1,213	Jerry West*LAL	170	1978–79
1979–80	Julius Erving*PHI	108	Kareem Abdul-Jabbar*LAL	493	Jerry West*LAL	1,213	Jerry West*LAL	170	1979–80
1980–81	Moses Malone*HOU	148	Kareem Abdul-Jabbar*LAL	513	Jerry West*LAL	1,213	Jerry West*LAL	170	1980–81
1981–82	Julius Erving*PHI	124	Kareem Abdul-Jabbar*LAL	568	Jerry West*LAL	1,213	Jerry West*LAL	170	1981–82
1982–83	Moses Malone*PHI	86	Kareem Abdul-Jabbar*LAL	648	Jerry West*LAL	1,213	Jerry West*LAL	170	1982–83
1983–84	Larry Bird*BOS	167	Kareem Abdul-Jabbar*LAL	738	Jerry West*LAL	1,213	Jerry West*LAL	170	1983–84
1984–85	Larry Bird*BOS; Kevin McHale*BOS	121	Kareem Abdul-Jabbar*LAL	818	Jerry West*LAL	1,213	Jerry West*LAL	170	1984–85
1985–86	Hakeem Olajuwon*HOU	127	Kareem Abdul-Jabbar*LAL	866	Jerry West*LAL	1,213	Jerry West*LAL	170	1985–86
1986–87	Larry Bird*BOS	176	Kareem Abdul-Jabbar*LAL	963	Jerry West*LAL	1,213	Larry Bird*BOS	176	1986–87
1987–88	Adrian Dantley*DET	140	Kareem Abdul-Jabbar*LAL	1,019	Jerry West*LAL	1,213	Larry Bird*BOS	176	1987–88
1988–89	Michael Jordan*CHI	183	Kareem Abdul-Jabbar*LAL	1,050	Jerry West*LAL	1,213	Michael Jordan*CHI	183	1988–89
1989–90	Terry PorterPOR	139	Magic Johnson*LAL	883	Jerry West*LAL	1,213	Michael Jordan*CHI	183	1989–90
1990–91	Magic Johnson*LAL	157	Magic Johnson*LAL	1,040	Jerry West*LAL	1,213	Michael Jordan*CHI	183	1990–91
1991–92	Karl Malone*UTA	169	Larry Bird*BOS	901	Jerry West*LAL	1,213	Michael Jordan*CHI	183	1991–92
1992–93	Charles Barkley*PHO	168	Michael Jordan*CHI	942	Jerry West*LAL	1,213	Michael Jordan*CHI	183	1992–93
1993–94	Hakeem Olajuwon*HOU	128	Moses Malone*PHI	576	Jerry West*LAL	1,213	Michael Jordan*CHI	183	1993–94
1994–95	Shaquille O'Neal*ORL	149	Michael Jordan*CHI	1,006	Jerry West*LAL	1,213	Michael Jordan*CHI	183	1994–95
1995–96	Michael Jordan*CHI	153	Michael Jordan*CHI	1,159	Jerry West*LAL	1,213	Michael Jordan*CHI	183	1995–96
1996–97	Karl Malone*UTA	144	Michael Jordan*CHI	1,282	Michael Jordan*CHI	1,282	Michael Jordan*CHI	183	1996–97
1997–98	Michael Jordan*CHI	181	Michael Jordan*CHI	1,463	Michael Jordan*CHI	1,463	Michael Jordan*CHI	183	1997–98
1998–99	Latrell SprewellNYK	113	Karl Malone*UTA	1,070	Michael Jordan*CHI	1,463	Michael Jordan*CHI	183	1998–99
1999–00	Shaquille O'Neal*LAL	135	Karl Malone*UTA	1,134	Michael Jordan*CHI	1,463	Michael Jordan*CHI	183	1999–00
2000–01	Allen Iverson*PHI	161	Karl Malone*UTA	1,173	Michael Jordan*CHI	1,463	Michael Jordan*CHI	183	2000–01
2001–02	Shaquille O'Neal*LAL	135	Michael Jordan*WAS	1,463	Michael Jordan*CHI	1,463	Michael Jordan*CHI	183	2001–02
2002–03	Tim Duncan*SAS	157	Michael Jordan*WAS	1,463	Michael Jordan*CHI	1,463	Michael Jordan*CHI	183	2002–03
2003–04	Kobe Bryant*LAL	135	Karl Malone*LAL	1,269	Michael Jordan*CHI	1,463	Michael Jordan*CHI	183	2003–04
2004–05	Tim Duncan*SAS Manu Ginóbili*SAS	147	Shaquille O'Neal*; MIA 2004–07; PHO 2007–09; CLE 2009–10	1,028	Michael Jordan*CHI	1,463	Michael Jordan*CHI	183	2004–05
2005–06	Dirk Nowitzki*DAL	205	Shaquille O'Neal*; MIA 2004–07; PHO 2007–09; CLE 2009–10	1,096	Michael Jordan*CHI	1,463	Dirk Nowitzki*DAL	205	2005–06
2006–07	LeBron James^CLE	148	Shaquille O'Neal*; MIA 2004–07; PHO 2007–09; CLE 2009–10	1,105	Michael Jordan*CHI	1,463	Dirk Nowitzki*DAL	205	2006–07
2007–08	Kobe Bryant*LAL	157	Shaquille O'Neal*; MIA 2004–07; PHO 2007–09; CLE 2009–10	1,137	Michael Jordan*CHI	1,463	Dirk Nowitzki*DAL	205	2007–08
2008–09	Kobe Bryant*LAL	174	Shaquille O'Neal*; MIA 2004–07; PHO 2007–09; CLE 2009–10	1,137	Michael Jordan*CHI	1,463	Dirk Nowitzki*DAL	205	2008–09
2009–10	Kobe Bryant*LAL	154	Kobe Bryant*LAL	1,191	Michael Jordan*CHI	1,463	Dirk Nowitzki*DAL	205	2009–10
2010–11	Dirk Nowitzki*DAL	175	Kobe Bryant*LAL	1,241	Michael Jordan*CHI	1,463	Dirk Nowitzki*DAL	205	2010–11
2011–12	LeBron James^MIA	173	Kobe Bryant*LAL	1,320	Michael Jordan*CHI	1,463	Dirk Nowitzki*DAL	205	2011–12
2012–13	LeBron James^MIA	136	Kobe Bryant*LAL	1,320	Michael Jordan*CHI	1,463	Dirk Nowitzki*DAL	205	2012–13
2013–14	Russell Westbrook^OKC	145	Kobe Bryant*LAL	1,320	Michael Jordan*CHI	1,463	Dirk Nowitzki*DAL	205	2013–14
2014–15	James Harden^HOU	163	Kobe Bryant*LAL	1,320	Michael Jordan*CHI	1,463	Dirk Nowitzki*DAL	205	2014–15
2015–16	Kevin Durant^OKC	130	LeBron James^ CLE 2015–18; LAL 2018–26	1,355	Michael Jordan*CHI	1,463	Dirk Nowitzki*DAL	205	2015–16
2016–17	LeBron James^CLE	113	LeBron James^ CLE 2015–18; LAL 2018–26	1,468	LeBron James^ CLE 2016–18; LAL 2018–26	1,468	Dirk Nowitzki*DAL	205	2016–17
2017–18	LeBron James^CLE	159	LeBron James^ CLE 2015–18; LAL 2018–26	1,627	LeBron James^ CLE 2016–18; LAL 2018–26	1,627	Dirk Nowitzki*DAL	205	2017–18
2018–19	Kawhi Leonard^TOR	191	LeBron James^ CLE 2015–18; LAL 2018–26	1,627	LeBron James^ CLE 2016–18; LAL 2018–26	1,627	Dirk Nowitzki*DAL	205	2018–19
2019–20	Jimmy Butler^MIA	164	LeBron James^ CLE 2015–18; LAL 2018–26	1,735	LeBron James^ CLE 2016–18; LAL 2018–26	1,735	Dirk Nowitzki*DAL	205	2019–20
2020–21	Devin Booker^PHO	133	LeBron James^ CLE 2015–18; LAL 2018–26	1,749	LeBron James^ CLE 2016–18; LAL 2018–26	1,749	Dirk Nowitzki*DAL	205	2020–21
2021–22	Jayson Tatum^BOS	136	LeBron James^ CLE 2015–18; LAL 2018–26	1,749	LeBron James^ CLE 2016–18; LAL 2018–26	1,749	Dirk Nowitzki*DAL	205	2021–22
2022–23	Jimmy Butler^MIA	150	LeBron James^ CLE 2015–18; LAL 2018–26	1,819	LeBron James^ CLE 2016–18; LAL 2018–26	1,819	Dirk Nowitzki*DAL	205	2022–23
2023–24	Jayson Tatum^BOS	118	LeBron James^ CLE 2015–18; LAL 2018–26	1,836	LeBron James^ CLE 2016–18; LAL 2018–26	1,836	Dirk Nowitzki*DAL	205	2023–24
2024–25	Shai Gilgeous-Alexander^OKC	190	LeBron James^ CLE 2015–18; LAL 2018–26	1,867	LeBron James^ CLE 2016–18; LAL 2018–26	1,867	Dirk Nowitzki*DAL	205	2024–25
2025–26	Victor Wembanyama^SAS	133	LeBron James^ CLE 2015–18; LAL 2018–26	1,914	LeBron James^ CLE 2016–18; LAL 2018–26	1,914	Dirk Nowitzki*DAL	205	2025–26
Season	Year-by-year leader	FT	Active player leader	FT	Career record	FT	Single-season record	FT	Season

== See also ==
- Basketball statistics
- NBA post-season records
