= Elgin Baylor =

American basketball player (1934–2021)

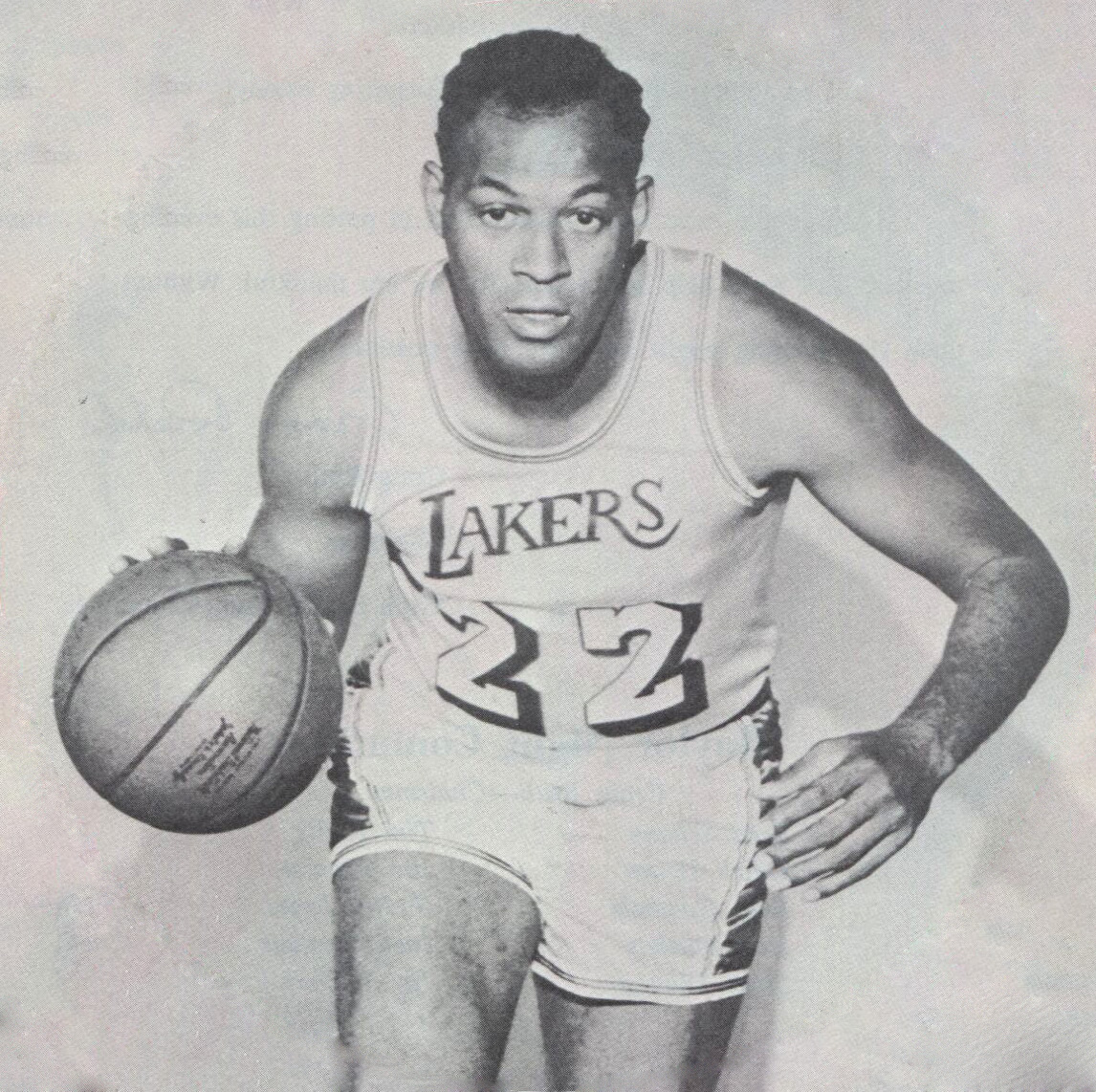
- Baylor with the Los Angeles Lakers in 1969

Personal information
- Born: September 16, 1934 Washington, D.C., U.S.
- Died: March 22, 2021 (aged 86) Los Angeles, California, U.S.
- Listed height: 6 ft 5 in (1.96 m)
- Listed weight: 225 lb (102 kg)

Career information
- High school: Phelps (Washington, D.C.); Spingarn (Washington, D.C.)
- College: College of Idaho (1954–1955); Seattle (1956–1958)
- NBA draft: 1958: 1st round, 1st overall pick
- Drafted by: Minneapolis Lakers
- Playing career: 1958–1971
- Position: Small forward
- Number: 22
- Coaching career: 1974–1979

Career history

Playing
- 1958–1971: Minneapolis / Los Angeles Lakers

Career highlights
- As player: 11× NBA All-Star (1959–1965, 1967–1970); NBA All-Star Game co-MVP (Note: along with Bob Pettit) (1959); 10× All-NBA First Team (1959–1965, 1967–1969); NBA Rookie of the Year (1959); NBA anniversary team (35th, 50th, 75th); No. 22 retired by Los Angeles Lakers; NCAA Final Four Most Outstanding Player (1958); Helms Foundation Player of the Year (1958); Consensus first-team All-American (1958); Consensus second-team All-American (1957); 2× NCAA rebounding leader (1957, 1958); No. 22 retired by Seattle Redhawks; As executive: NBA Executive of the Year (2006)

Career statistics
- Points: 23,149 (27.4 ppg)
- Rebounds: 11,463 (13.5 rpg)
- Assists: 3,650 (4.3 apg)
- Stats at NBA.com
- Stats at Basketball Reference
- Basketball Hall of Fame
- Collegiate Basketball Hall of Fame

Elgin Gay Baylor (/ˈɛldʒɪn/ EL-jin; September 16, 1934 – March 22, 2021) was an American professional basketball player, coach, and executive. He played 14 seasons as a forward in the National Basketball Association (NBA) for the Minneapolis/Los Angeles Lakers. Baylor was a gifted shooter, a strong rebounder, and an accomplished passer, who was best known for his trademark hanging jump shot. The No. 1 draft pick in 1958, NBA Rookie of the Year in 1959, 11-time NBA All-Star, and a 10-time member of the All-NBA first team, Baylor is regarded as one of the game's greatest ever players. In 1977, Baylor was inducted into the Naismith Memorial Basketball Hall of Fame. In 1996, Baylor was named as one of the 50 Greatest Players in NBA History. In October 2021, Baylor was again honored as one of the league's greatest players of all time by being named to the NBA's 75th Anniversary Team. Baylor is the leader for most career rebounds in Lakers franchise history with 11,463.

Baylor spent 22 years as general manager of the Los Angeles Clippers, having managed the team for the majority of the Donald Sterling ownership period. He won the NBA Executive of the Year Award in 2006. Two years later, the Clippers relieved him of his executive duties shortly before the 2008–09 season began. In 1974, he volunteered to play a mixed doubles exhibition tennis match with Tracy Austin against Lawrence McCutcheon and Lea Antonopolis in Clarement, California, for a sold-out crowd.

His popularity led to appearances on the television series Rowan & Martin's Laugh-In in 1968; the Jackson 5's first TV special in 1971; a Buck Rogers in the 25th Century episode "Olympiad"; and an episode of The White Shadow titled "If Your Number's Up, Get Down".

== Early life ==
Elgin "Rabbit" Baylor was born in Washington, D.C., on September 16, 1934, the son of Uzziel (Lewis) and John Wesley Baylor. He began playing basketball when he was 14. He was named after the Elgin National Watch Company, who made his father's favorite watch.

Although he grew up near a D.C. city recreation center, African Americans were banned from using the facilities, and Baylor had limited access to basketball courts growing up. He had two basketball-playing brothers, Sal and Kermit. After stints at Southwest Boys Club and Brown Jr. High, Baylor was a three-time All-City player in high school.

Baylor played his first two years of high school basketball at Phelps Vocational High School in the 1951 and 1952 seasons. At the time, public schools in Washington, D.C., were segregated, so he only played against other black high school teams. There, Baylor set his first area scoring record of 44 points, versus Cardozo H.S. During his two All-City years at Phelps, he averaged 18.5 and 27.6 points per season. He did not perform well academically and dropped out of school (1952–53) to work in a furniture store and play basketball in the local recreational leagues.

Baylor reappeared for the 1954 season as a senior playing for the recently opened all-black Spingarn High School. The 6 ft 5 in (1.96 m), 225 lb (102 kg) senior was named first-team Washington All-Metropolitan, and was the first African-American player named to that team. Baylor also won the SSA's Livingstone Trophy as the area's best basketball player for 1954. He finished with a 36.1 average for his eight Interhigh Division II league games.

On February 3, 1954, in a game against his old Phelps team, Baylor scored 31 in the first half. Playing with four fouls the entire second half, Baylor scored 32 more points to establish a new DC-area record with 63 points. This broke the point record of 52 that Western's Jim Wexler had set the year before when he broke Baylor's previous record of 44. However, because Wexler was white and Baylor was black, Baylor's record did not receive the same press coverage from the media, including the Washington Post, as Wexler's.

== College career ==
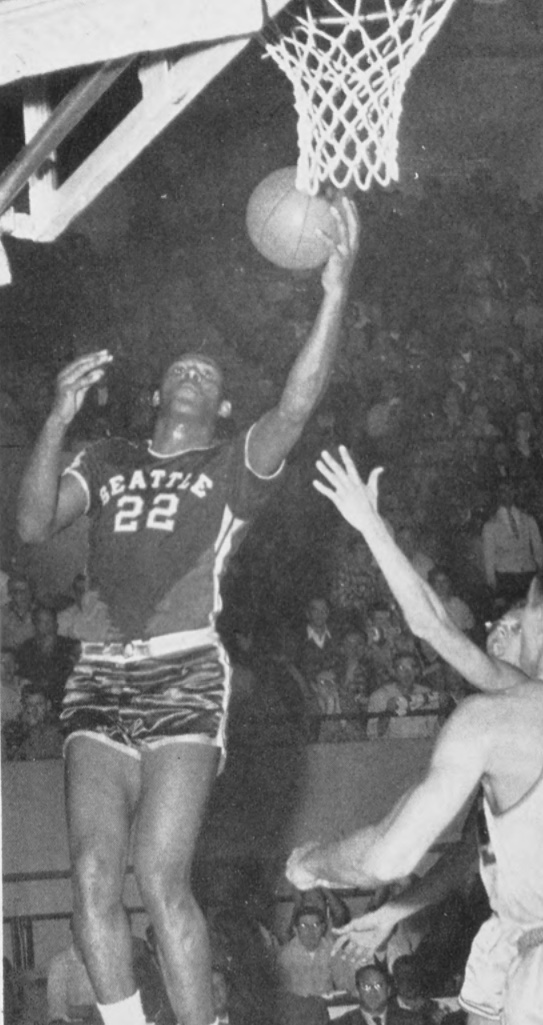
Baylor at Seattle

Despite his success as a high school basketball player, no major college recruited Baylor because at the time, college scouts did not recruit at black high schools. While some colleges were willing to accept Baylor, he did not qualify academically. A friend of Baylor's who attended the College of Idaho helped arrange a football scholarship for Baylor for the 1954–55 academic year. Baylor never played football for the school, however; instead, he was accepted to the college's basketball team without having to try out. He outperformed the other players on the team that season, averaging over 31 points and 20 rebounds per game.

After the season, the College of Idaho dismissed its head basketball coach and restricted the scholarships. A Seattle car dealer interested Baylor in Seattle University, and Baylor sat out a year to play for Westside Ford, an Amateur Athletic Union team in Seattle, while establishing eligibility at Seattle. The Minneapolis Lakers drafted him in the 14th round of the 1956 NBA draft, but Baylor opted to stay in school instead.

During the 1956–57 season, Baylor averaged 29.7 points per game and 20.3 rebounds per game for Seattle. The next season, Baylor averaged 32.5 points per game and led the Chieftains (now known as the Redhawks) to the NCAA championship game, Seattle's only trip to the Final Four, falling to the Kentucky Wildcats. Following his junior season, Baylor was drafted again by the Minneapolis Lakers, with the No. 1 pick in the 1958 NBA draft, and this time he opted to leave school to join them for the 1958–59 NBA season.

Over three collegiate seasons, one at the College of Idaho and two at Seattle, Baylor averaged 31.3 points per game and 19.5 rebounds per game. He led the NCAA in rebounding for both the 1956–57 and 1957–58 seasons.

== Professional career ==
=== Minneapolis / Los Angeles Lakers (1958–1971) ===
==== Rookie of the Year (1958–1959) ====
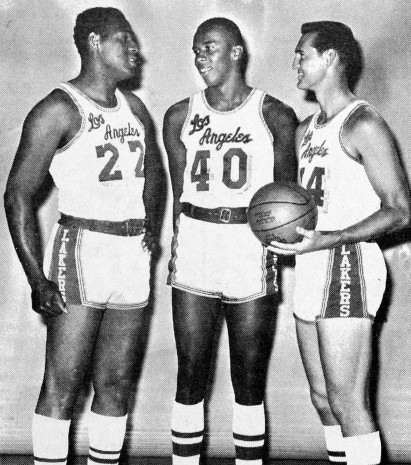
Baylor standing next to teammates Jerry Chambers (center) and Jerry West (right), circa 1966

The Minneapolis Lakers used the No. 1 overall pick in the 1958 NBA draft to select Baylor, then convinced him to skip his senior year at SU and instead join the pro ranks. The team had been unsuccessful since the retirement of its star center George Mikan in 1954. The year prior to Baylor's arrival, the team finished 19–53 – the worst record in the league – with a squad that was slow, bulky and aging. It had no permanent home arena to play in, was losing popularity, and in financial trouble. Owner Bob Short, who was ready to sell the team, believed Baylor's star athletic talents and all-around game could save the franchise. Short told the Los Angeles Times in a 1971 interview: "If he had turned me down then, I would have been out of business. The club would have gone bankrupt." Baylor signed with the Lakers for $20,000 per year (equivalent to $220,000 in 2025), a large sum in the NBA at the time. According to basketball historian James Fisher, by virtue of his exceptional skills and his central role in the team's business plan, Baylor became the NBA's first franchise player.

Baylor immediately exceeded expectations and ultimately saved the Lakers franchise. As a rookie in 1958–59, Baylor finished fourth in the league in scoring (24.9 points per game), third in rebounding (15.0 rebounds per game), and eighth in assists (4.1 assists per game). He scored 55 points in a single game, then the third-highest mark in league history behind Joe Fulks' 63 and Mikan's 61.

On January 16, 1959, Baylor refused to play in a road game in Charleston, West Virginia, after the hotel the team booked denied lodging to the team's three black players. When a teammate tried to convince Baylor to play in the game, Baylor said, "I'm a human being, I'm not an animal put in a cage and let out for the show."

Baylor won the NBA Rookie of the Year Award and led the Lakers to the NBA Finals, where they lost to the Boston Celtics in the first four-game sweep in finals history, kicking off the greatest rivalry in NBA history.

==== Peak years (1959–1965) ====
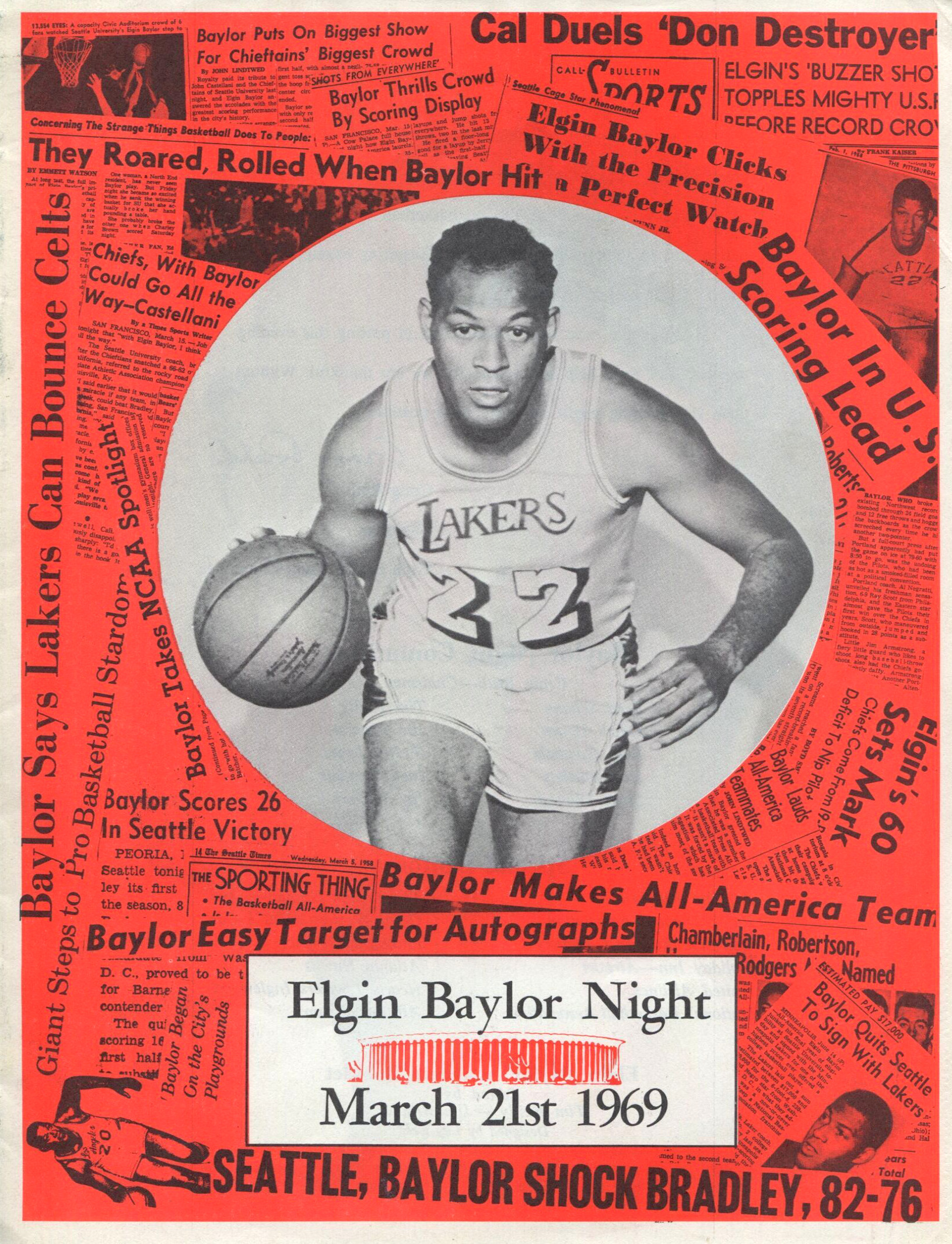
The cover of the Los Angeles Lakers program for "Elgin Baylor Night" on March 21, 1969

In 1960, the Lakers moved from Minnesota to Los Angeles, drafted Jerry West to play point guard, and hired Fred Schaus who was also the coach during West's college career. The duo of Baylor and West, joined in 1968 by center Wilt Chamberlain, led the Lakers to success in the Western Division throughout the 1960s.

From the 1960–61 to the 1962–63 seasons, Baylor averaged 34.8, 38.3, and 34.0 points per game, respectively. On November 15 of the 1960–61 season, Baylor set an NBA scoring record when he scored 71 points in a victory against the New York Knicks, while also grabbing 25 rebounds. In doing so, Baylor became the first NBA player to score more than 70 points in a game, breaking his own NBA record of 64 points that he had set the previous November. Baylor held the record until 1962, when Chamberlain scored 100 points.

Baylor, a United States Army Reservist, was called to active duty during the 1961–62 season, and being stationed at Fort Lewis in Washington, he could play for the Lakers only when on a weekend pass. He was unable to practice with the team before or during the season, and had to fly coach across the country on weekends to join the team at whichever arena they were appearing. Despite playing only 48 games that season, he still managed to score over 1,800 points, averaging 38.3 points (the highest average in NBA history by any player other than Chamberlain), 18.6 rebounds, and 4.6 assists per game. Later that season, in a Game Five NBA Finals victory against the Boston Celtics, Baylor set the still-standing NBA record for points in an NBA Finals game with 61. Basketball historian James Fisher described Baylor's performance that season as: "Not bad for a part-time job." Baylor later said he "kind of enjoyed that season."

==== Knee injury and later seasons (1965–1971) ====
Baylor suffered a severe knee injury during the opening game of the 1965 Western Division playoffs, which required surgery and left him unable to play in the remainder of the playoffs. Although he averaged scoring over 24 points in each of the next four seasons despite his injury, the limitations of knee surgery at the time and the lack of meaningful rehabilitation left him with nagging knee problems, ultimately resulting in surgery on both knees, which impaired his playing ability for the rest of his career.

Baylor played just two games in 1970–71 before rupturing his Achilles tendon, and finally retired nine games into the subsequent 1971–72 season because of his nagging injuries. Baylor told the press that he could no longer play at the highest level of the sport and wanted to free up room on the Lakers' roster for other players.

In 14 seasons as the Lakers' forward, Baylor helped lead the team to the NBA Finals eight times, but the team lost each time. As a result of his retirement at the beginning of the season, Baylor missed two historic achievements: the Lakers' first game afterwards began an NBA record 33-game win streak, after which they won the 1972 championship.

== Coaching career ==
In 1974, Baylor was hired to be an assistant coach and later the head coach for the New Orleans Jazz, but had a lackluster 86–135 record and was fired following the 1978–79 season, shortly before the team moved to Salt Lake City, Utah.

== Executive career ==
In 1986, Baylor was hired by the Los Angeles Clippers as the team's vice president of basketball operations. He was selected as the NBA Executive of the Year in 2006. During his tenure, the Clippers managed only two winning seasons and amassed a win–loss record of 607–1153. They made the playoffs only four times, and won only one playoff series. He stayed in that capacity for 22 years until October 2008.

== Later life and death ==
In 2009 Baylor filed an employment discrimination lawsuit against the Clippers, team owner Donald Sterling, team president Andy Roeser, and the NBA. He alleged that he was underpaid during his tenure with the team and then fired because of his age and race. Baylor later dropped the racial discrimination claims in the suit. In 2011, a jury decided in the Clippers' favor on Baylor's remaining claims, finding Baylor's termination was based on the team's poor performance. However, Baylor felt vindicated when Sterling was banned for life from the NBA in 2014 after recordings of him making racist comments were publicized by the press.

Baylor died in a Los Angeles hospital of natural causes on March 22, 2021, aged 86. He is interred in the Forest Lawn Memorial Park, Hollywood Hills. He was surrounded by his wife Elaine and their daughter Krystle; two children from a previous marriage, Alan and Alison; and a sister, Gladys.

== Player profile ==
Baylor was known as an all-around player, excelling at offense, rebounding, and passing. At 6'5", 225lbs, he was short for a forward when the average NBA player was 6'6 by 1963, the period in which he played but he had the strength to "muscle through" defenders, and the finesse and creativity to maneuver around them, including to rebound missed shots and score second chance points.

Baylor was known for his superior leaping abilities that allowed him to score by staying in the air longer than defenders; Bill Russell called him "the godfather of hang time." He invented "moves" to deceive defenders, involving changing hands or changing direction, even mid-air. His weakness was on defense, as he was criticized for his shortcomings defensively and was famously described by Wilt Chamberlain as having the interest in defense equivalent to baseball player Ted Williams playing on the left field.

As for Baylor's offensive repertoire, it included a running bank shot and a left-handed hook shot, though he was right-handed. He had an on-court facial twitch that he used as a head fake. Baylor credited his success to a talent for jumping and the creativity to spontaneously react to the defense.

== Legacy ==
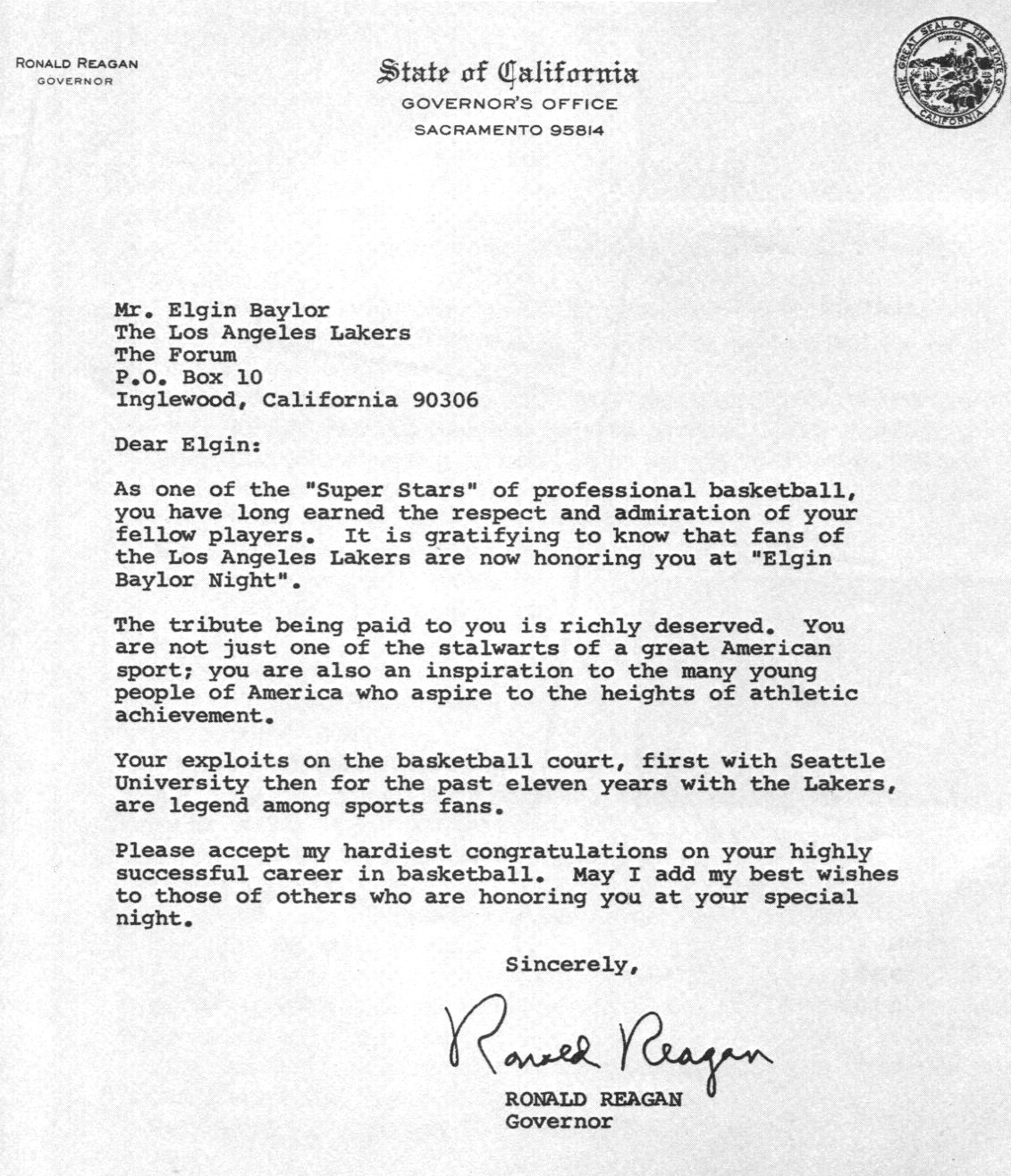
A letter from California Governor Ronald Reagan to Elgin Baylor

Since the beginning of his NBA career, Baylor has been considered one of the best basketball players in the world, and his reputation as one of the greatest in history has endured. Before Baylor joined the NBA in 1958, the league's play was methodical but mechanical, dominated by set jump shots and running hook shots. Baylor introduced a creative and acrobatic playing style that would later be emulated by other NBA superstars such as Julius Erving and Michael Jordan. Bill Simmons wrote, "Along with Russell, Elgin turned a horizontal game into a vertical one." Baylor's skill was esteemed by his contemporaries: Oscar Robertson wrote Baylor "was the first and original high flier"; Bill Sharman said Baylor was "the greatest cornerman who ever played pro basketball"; Tom Heinsohn said, "Baylor as forward beats out Bird, Julius Erving and everybody else".

Baylor was the last of the undersized forwards in the league, many guards now being his size or bigger. He finished his playing days with 23,149 points, 3,650 assists and 11,463 rebounds over 846 games. His signature running bank shot, which he was able to release quickly and effectively over taller players, led him to numerous NBA scoring records, several of which still stand.

The 71 points Baylor scored on November 15, 1960, was a record at the time; it was also a team record that would not be surpassed until Kobe Bryant scored 81 points against the Toronto Raptors in January 2006. The 61 points he scored in Game 5 of the NBA Finals in 1962 is still an NBA Finals record. Over his career, he averaged 27.4 points and 4.3 assists per game. An underrated rebounder, Baylor averaged 13.5 rebounds per game during his career, including a remarkable 19.8 rebounds per game during the 1960–61 season—a season average exceeded by only five other players in NBA history, all of whom were 6 ft 8 in (2.03 m) or taller.

A 10-time All-NBA First Team selection and 11-time NBA All-Star, Baylor was elected to the Naismith Memorial Basketball Hall of Fame in 1977. He was named to the NBA 35th Anniversary All-Time Team in 1980, the NBA 50th Anniversary All-Time Team in 1996 and the NBA 75th Anniversary Team in 2021. in 2009, SLAM Magazine ranked him number 11 among its Top 50 NBA players of all time. In 2022, to commemorate the NBA's 75th Anniversary The Athletic ranked their top 75 players of all time, and named Baylor as the 23rd greatest player in NBA history. He is often listed as the greatest NBA player never to win a championship, although the Lakers did give Baylor a championship ring for his contributions at the start of the 1971–72 season.

Fifty-one years after Baylor left Seattle University, they named its basketball court in honor of him on November 19, 2009. The Redhawks now play on the Elgin Baylor Court in Seattle's KeyArena. The Redhawks also host the annual Elgin Baylor Classic. In June 2017, The College of Idaho had Baylor as one of the inaugural inductees into the school's Hall of Fame.

The first biography of Baylor was written by Slam Online contributor Bijan C. Bayne in 2015, and published by Rowman and Littlefield.

On April 6, 2018, a statue of Baylor, designed by Gary Tillery and Omri Amrany, was unveiled at the Staples Center prior to a Lakers game against the Minnesota Timberwolves.

== NBA career statistics ==
Legend
GP	Games played	GS	Games started	MPG	Minutes per game
FG%	Field goal percentage	3P%	3-point field goal percentage	FT%	Free throw percentage
RPG	Rebounds per game	APG	Assists per game	SPG	Steals per game
BPG	Blocks per game	PPG	Points per game	**Bold**	Career high
†	Won an NBA championship

Elgin Baylor regular season statistics
Year	Team	GP	MPG	FG%	FT%	RPG	APG	PPG
1958–59	Minneapolis	70	40.8	.408	.777	15.0	4.1	24.9
1959–60	Minneapolis	70	41.0	.424	.732	16.4	3.5	29.6
1960–61	L.A. Lakers	73	42.9	.430	.783	**19.8**	5.1	34.8
1961–62	L.A. Lakers	48	**44.4**	.428	.754	18.6	4.6	**38.3**
1962–63	L.A. Lakers	**80***	42.1	.453	**.837**	14.3	4.8	34.0
1963–64	L.A. Lakers	78	40.6	.425	.804	12.0	4.4	25.4
1964–65	L.A. Lakers	74	41.3	.401	.792	12.8	3.8	27.1
1965–66	L.A. Lakers	65	30.4	.401	.739	9.6	3.4	16.6
1966–67	L.A. Lakers	70	38.7	.429	.813	12.8	3.1	26.6
1967–68	L.A. Lakers	77	39.3	.443	.786	12.2	4.6	26.0
1968–69	L.A. Lakers	76	40.3	.447	.743	10.6	**5.4**	24.8
1969–70	L.A. Lakers	54	41.0	**.486**	.773	10.4	**5.4**	24.0
1970–71	L.A. Lakers	2	28.5	.421	.667	5.5	1.0	10.0
1971–72†	L.A. Lakers	9	26.6	.433	.815	6.3	2.0	11.8
Career		846	40.0	.431	.780	13.5	4.3	27.4
All-Star		11	29.2	.427	.796	9.0	3.5	19.8

Elgin Baylor playoffs statistics
Year	Team	GP	MPG	FG%	FT%	RPG	APG	PPG
1959	Minneapolis	13	42.8	.403	.770	12.0	3.3	25.5
1960	Minneapolis	9	**45.3**	**.474**	**.840**	14.1	3.4	33.4
1961	L.A. Lakers	12	45.0	.470	.824	15.3	4.6	38.1
1962	L.A. Lakers	13	43.9	.438	.774	**17.7**	3.6	**38.6**
1963	L.A. Lakers	13	43.2	.442	.825	13.6	4.5	32.6
1964	L.A. Lakers	5	44.2	.378	.775	11.6	**5.6**	24.2
1965	L.A. Lakers	1	5.0	.000	–	0.0	1.0	0.0
1966	L.A. Lakers	14	41.9	.442	.810	14.1	3.7	26.8
1967	L.A. Lakers	3	40.3	.368	.750	13.0	3.0	23.7
1968	L.A. Lakers	15	42.2	.468	.679	14.5	4.0	28.5
1969	L.A. Lakers	**18**	35.6	.385	.630	9.2	4.1	15.4
1970	L.A. Lakers	**18**	37.1	.466	.741	9.6	4.6	18.7
Career		134	41.1	.439	.769	12.9	4.0	27.0

== Head coaching record ==
Legend
Regular season	G	Games coached	W	Games won	L	Games lost	W–L %	Win–loss %
Playoffs	PG	Playoff games	PW	Playoff wins	PL	Playoff losses	PW–L %	Playoff win–loss %

Elgin Baylor coaching record
Team	Year	G	W	L	W–L%	Finish	PG	PW	PL	PW–L%	Result
New Orleans	1974–75	1	0	1	.000	(interim)	–	–	–	–	–
New Orleans	1976–77	56	21	35	.375	5th in central	–	–	–	–	Missed Playoffs
New Orleans	1977–78	82	39	43	.476	5th in central	–	–	–	–	Missed Playoffs
New Orleans	1978–79	82	26	56	.317	6th in central	–	–	–	–	Missed Playoffs
Career		221	86	135	.389		–	–	–	–	

== See also ==
- List of NBA career scoring leaders
- List of NBA career rebounding leaders
- List of NBA career free throw scoring leaders
- List of NBA career triple-double leaders
- List of NBA career playoff scoring leaders
- List of NBA career playoff rebounding leaders
- List of NBA career playoff free throw scoring leaders
- List of NBA career playoff triple-double leaders
- List of NBA single-game scoring leaders
- List of NBA single-game playoff scoring leaders
- List of NBA rookie single-season scoring leaders
- List of NCAA Division I men's basketball season rebounding leaders
- List of NCAA Division I men's basketball career rebounding leaders
- List of NCAA Division I men's basketball players with 30 or more rebounds in a game
- List of NCAA Division I men's basketball players with 2000 points and 1000 rebounds
- List of NCAA Division I men's basketball players with 60 or more points in a game
