= Win Wilfong =

American basketball player

Personal information
- Born: March 18, 1933 Puxico, Missouri, U.S.
- Died: May 18, 1985 (aged 52) Lincoln, Illinois, U.S.
- Listed height: 6 ft 2 in (1.88 m)
- Listed weight: 185 lb (84 kg)

Career information
- High school: Puxico (Puxico, Missouri)
- College: Missouri (1951–1953); Memphis (1955–1957)
- NBA draft: 1957: 1st round, 4th overall pick
- Drafted by: St. Louis Hawks
- Playing career: 1957–1963
- Position: Shooting guard / small forward
- Number: 15, 10, 22, 41

Career history
- 1957–1959: St. Louis Hawks
- 1959–1961: Cincinnati Royals
- 1961–1963: Kansas City Steers

Career highlights
- NBA champion (1958); No. 22 retired by Memphis Tigers

Career NBA statistics
- Points: 1,826 (6.8 ppg)
- Rebounds: 910 (3.4 rpg)
- Assists: 565 (2.1 apg)
- Stats at NBA.com
- Stats at Basketball Reference
Medals
Representing United States
Men's basketball
Pan American Games
Gold medal – first place	1955 Mexico City	Team competition

Alva Winfred Wilfong (March 18, 1933 – May 18, 1985) was an American professional basketball player.

A 6'2" guard/forward from the University of Missouri and the University of Memphis, Wilfong played four seasons (1957–1961) in the National Basketball Association as a member of the St. Louis Hawks and Cincinnati Royals. He averaged 6.8 points per game and won a league championship with St. Louis in 1958.

== Career statistics ==
Legend
GP	Games played	GS	Games started	MPG	Minutes per game
FG%	Field goal percentage	3P%	3-point field goal percentage	FT%	Free throw percentage
RPG	Rebounds per game	APG	Assists per game	SPG	Steals per game
BPG	Blocks per game	PPG	Points per game	**Bold**	Career high
†	Won an NBA championship	*	Led the league

=== NBA ===
==== Regular season ====
Year	Team	GP	MPG	FG%	FT%	RPG	APG	PPG
1957–58†	St. Louis	71	19.2	.361	.685	4.1	2.3	7.8
1958–59	St. Louis	63	11.8	.347	.756	1.9	.8	4.1
1959–60	Cincinnati	**72**	**27.7**	**.370**	.778	**4.9**	**3.7**	**10.1**
1960–61	Cincinnati	62	11.6	.348	**.809**	2.4	1.4	4.6
Career		268	17.9	.361	.744	3.4	2.1	6.8

==== Playoffs ====
Year	Team	GP	MPG	FG%	FT%	RPG	APG	PPG
1958†	St. Louis	**11***	**14.7**	.275	.697	**3.7**	**2.3**	**5.5**
1959	St. Louis	5	9.2	**.368**	**.833**	1.2	.6	3.8
Career		16	13.0	.295	.718	2.9	1.8	5.0
