= Ralph Davis (basketball) =

American basketball player (1938–2021)

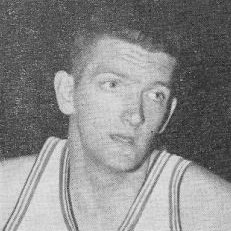

Personal information
- Born: September 7, 1938 Vanceburg, Kentucky
- Died: May 30, 2021 (aged 82)
- Listed height: 6 ft 4 in (1.93 m)
- Listed weight: 180 lb (82 kg)

Career information
- High school: Lewis County (Vanceburg, Kentucky)
- College: Cincinnati (1957–1960)
- NBA draft: 1960: 3rd round, 17th overall pick
- Drafted by: Cincinnati Royals
- Playing career: 1960–1962
- Position: Shooting guard
- Number: 10, 25

Career history
- 1960–1961: Cincinnati Royals
- 1961–1962: Chicago Packers

Career highlights
- First-team All-MVC (1959)

Career NBA statistics
- Points: 1,195 (8.0 ppg)
- Rebounds: 248 (1.7 rpg)
- Assists: 424 (2.8 apg)
- Stats at NBA.com
- Stats at Basketball Reference

Ralph E. Davis Jr. (September 7, 1938 – May 30, 2021) was an American professional basketball player who played two seasons in the National Basketball Association (NBA) and was a starter on two NCAA Final Four teams at the University of Cincinnati.

== Early life ==
Davis was born in Vanceburg, Kentucky, the son of Ralph E. Davis Sr., a self-employed businessman, and Anna Louis (Plummer) Davis. He played basketball at Lewis County High School in Vanceburg. He scored 1,810 points for the Lions and averaged 26.4 points and 18 rebounds per game as a senior. He was an all-district selection for three years. As a senior in 1956 he was named second team all-state by Louisville Courier-Journal as he led the Lions to the Eastern Kentucky Conference title. He was also an honor student.

== College career ==
Davis attended the University of Cincinnati, where he was a three-year starter for the Bearcats and coach George Smith.

As a sophomore in 1957–58, he averaged 7.9 points per game as the Bearcats posted a 25–1 record and won the Missouri Valley Conference (MVC) title led by fellow sophomore and future Hall-of-Famer forward Oscar Robertson and future longtime NBA player Connie Dierking.

As a junior in 1958–59, Davis started at point guard alongside Carl Bouldin and averaged 15.5 points (second to Robertson), 4.4 assists and 2.0 rebounds as the Bearcats were again MVC champions and Davis was named All-MVC. The 26–4 Bearcats advanced to the NCAA Final Four, where they finished in third place.

As a senior in 1959–60, Davis posted averages of 13.7 points (again second to Robertson), 4.4 assists and 2.0 rebounds per game while shooting 50 percent from the field as again the Bearcats won the league crown. Davis was named All-MVC and was also named second-team All-American by Converse. The Bearcats went 28–2, again advancing to the Final Four and again finishing third.

Davis' 1,093 career points ranked sixth in Cincinnati history upon his graduation in 1960.

== NBA career ==
Davis was drafted in the third round (17th overall) of the 1960 NBA draft by the Cincinnati Royals.

As a rookie in 1960–61, he played in 73 games, averaged 16.6 minutes, 2.4 assists and 1.2 rebounds per game as a reserve guard for the 33–46 Royals.

On April 26, 1961, he was drafted by the Chicago Packers in the NBA expansion draft. For the 1961–62 season, in 77 games Davis' playing time increased to nearly 26 minutes per game as he posted career-high averages of 10.4 points, 3.2 assists and 2.1 rebounds per game for the 18–62 expansion team. In November 1961, the Packers had traded Davis to the St. Louis Hawks in a multi-player deal, but the trade was rescinded by NBA Commissioner Maurice Podoloff.

In 1962 he was officially traded to the St. Louis Hawks, but he did not play and his NBA career ended after two seasons.

== Personal life ==
In 1981, Davis was inducted into the University of Cincinnati Athletics Hall of Fame. In 1998, he was inducted into the Greater Cincinnati Basketball Hall of Fame. In December 2010, Lewis County High School held a ceremony to retire Davis' number.

Davis was inducted into the inaugural class of the Lewis County high schools Hall of Fame in 2021.

Davis died on May 30, 2021, at age 82.

== Career statistics ==
Legend
GP	Games played	GS	Games started	MPG	Minutes per game
FG%	Field goal percentage	3P%	3-point field goal percentage	FT%	Free throw percentage
RPG	Rebounds per game	APG	Assists per game	SPG	Steals per game
BPG	Blocks per game	PPG	Points per game	**Bold**	Career high

=== NBA ===
==== Regular season ====
Year	Team	GP	MPG	FG%	FT%	RPG	APG	PPG
1960–61	Syracuse	73	16.6	.401	.654	1.2	2.4	5.4
1961–62	Chicago	**77**	**25.9**	**.413**	**.689**	**2.1**	**3.2**	**10.4**
Career		150	21.3	.409	.677	1.7	2.8	8.0
