= Phil Rollins =

American basketball player (1934–2021)

Personal information
- Born: January 19, 1934 Wickliffe, Kentucky, U.S.
- Died: February 8, 2021 (aged 87) Louisville, Kentucky, U.S.
- Listed height: 6 ft 2 in (1.88 m)
- Listed weight: 185 lb (84 kg)

Career information
- High school: Wickliffe (Wickliffe, Kentucky)
- College: Louisville (1952–1956)
- NBA draft: 1956: 2nd round, 15th overall pick
- Drafted by: Philadelphia Warriors
- Playing career: 1958–1963
- Position: Point guard / shooting guard
- Number: 20, 11, 12, 19, 3

Career history
- 1958: Philadelphia Warriors
- 1958–1960: Cincinnati Royals
- 1960: St. Louis Hawks
- 1960–1961: New York Knicks
- 1961–1963: Pittsburgh Rens

Career highlights
- NIT champion (1956); No. 9 jersey honored by Louisville Cardinals

Career NBA statistics
- Points: 898 (5.1 ppg)
- Rebounds: 405 (2.3 rpg)
- Assists: 458 (2.6 apg)
- Stats at NBA.com
- Stats at Basketball Reference

Philip Lee Rollins (January 19, 1934 – February 8, 2021) was an American professional basketball player.

== Biography ==
Rollins was selected in the 1956 NBA draft by the Philadelphia Warriors after a collegiate career at Louisville. As a senior in 1955–56 he helped lead the Cardinals to a National Invitation Tournament championship.

In Rollins' five-year professional career, most of which was spent in the National Basketball Association (NBA) (his final season was in the American Basketball League), he played for five different teams. In NBA games only, Rollins averaged 5.1 points, 2.3 rebounds and 2.6 assists per game.

His brother, Ken, starred at the University of Kentucky before starting a professional basketball career. Ken was also a member of the 1948 NCAA and Olympic Gold Medal teams.

He died on February 8, 2021, twenty days after his 87th birthday.

== Career statistics ==
Legend
GP	Games played	GS	Games started	MPG	Minutes per game
FG%	Field goal percentage	3P%	3-point field goal percentage	FT%	Free throw percentage
RPG	Rebounds per game	APG	Assists per game	SPG	Steals per game
BPG	Blocks per game	PPG	Points per game	**Bold**	Career high

=== NBA ===
==== Regular season ====
Year	Team	GP	MPG	FG%	FT%	RPG	APG	PPG
1958–59	Philadelphia	23	10.9	.333	.622	1.3	1.9	3.7
1958–59	Cincinnati	21	**21.0**	.375	**.778**	**4.1**	2.8	**6.8**
1959–60	Cincinnati	**72**	17.2	.409	.606	2.5	**3.2**	5.5
1960–61	St. Louis	7	10.1	**.450**	.000	.4	1.6	2.6
1960–61	Cincinnati	14	6.1	.313	.714	.6	.8	1.8
1960–61	New York	40	16.5	.373	.688	2.1	2.5	5.8
Career		177	15.5	.385	.649	2.2	2.6	5.1
