= Phelps Architecture, Construction and Engineering High School =

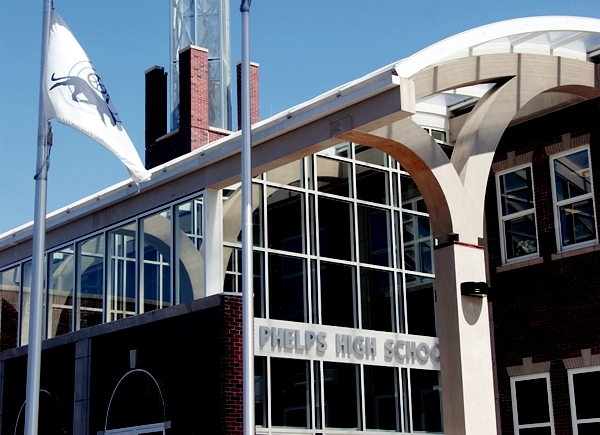
- Phelps A.C.E. High School

Location
- 704 26th Street NE; Washington, DC 20002; United States; 38°54′8″N 76°58′20″W

Information
- School type: Public high school
- Established: 1912
- Status: Open
- School board: District of Columbia State Board of Education
- School district: District of Columbia Public Schools
- NCES District ID: 1100030
- School number: DC-001-478
- CEEB code: 090150
- NCES School ID: 110003000407
- Principal: Cara Fuller
- Faculty: 34.50 (on an FTE basis)
- Grades: 9–12
- Enrollment: 276 (2020–2021)
  - Grade 9: 107
  - Grade 10: 75
  - Grade 11: 54
  - Grade 12: 40
- Student to teacher ratio: 8.00
- Campus type: Urban
- Color: Navy White Gray Light blue
- Nickname: Panthers
- USNWR ranking: 13,383–17,843 (2022)
- Communities served: Ward 5
- Website: phelpshsdc.org

Phelps Architecture, Construction and Engineering High School or Phelps A.C.E. High School is a public high school in the northeast quadrant of the District of Columbia, United States.

The school is often considered a prime example of the school investment program currently occurring in DC. Having fallen victim to time and neglect, the school was rebuilt by an award-winning architect from several smaller buildings into its current form. Along with architecture, construction, and engineering, other courses are also taught there, including vehicle maintenance/repair and operation of large vehicles such as cranes and diggers on state-of-the-art simulators. The school also has a small greenhouse where the students can tend plants. The school powers its buildings by various renewable energy sources (indicated by the color-coded pipes inside, each color denoting a different system). As part of their coursework, the school entrusts students to monitor and maintain components of this system.
