= Larry Staverman =

American basketball player and coach (1936–2007)

Personal information
- Born: October 11, 1936 Newport, Kentucky, U.S.
- Died: July 12, 2007 (aged 70) Edgewood, Kentucky, U.S.
- Listed height: 6 ft 7 in (2.01 m)
- Listed weight: 205 lb (93 kg)

Career information
- High school: Newport Catholic (Newport, Kentucky)
- College: Thomas More (1954–1958)
- NBA draft: 1958: 9th round, 64th overall pick
- Drafted by: Cincinnati Royals
- Playing career: 1958–1964
- Position: Power forward
- Number: 10, 21, 14, 24, 13
- Coaching career: 1965–1978

Career history

Playing
- 1958–1961: Cincinnati Royals
- 1961–1963: Kansas City Steers
- 1962–1963: Chicago Zephyrs / Baltimore Bullets
- 1963: Detroit Pistons
- 1963–1964: Cincinnati Royals

Coaching
- 1965–1967: Notre Dame (assistant)
- 1967–1968: Indiana Pacers
- 1977–1978: Kansas City Kings (assistant)
- 1978: Kansas City Kings (interim)

Career highlights
- All-ABL First Team (1962)

Career NBA statistics
- Points: 1,237 (4.7 ppg)
- Rebounds: 1,019 (3.8 rpg)
- Assists: 251 (0.9 apg)
- Stats at NBA.com
- Stats at Basketball Reference

Lawrence Joseph Staverman (October 11, 1936 – July 12, 2007) was an American professional basketball player and coach.

== Basketball career ==
A 6'7" forward from Villa Madonna College (now known as Thomas More College), Staverman was drafted in the 9th round of the 1958 NBA draft by the Cincinnati Royals. He had a five-year career as a player in the NBA, with the Royals, the Chicago Zephyrs/Baltimore Bullets, and the Detroit Pistons.

== Coaching career ==
Staverman was the first coach of the American Basketball Association's Indiana Pacers. He coached the team for its first season, where they went 38–40 and lost in a three-game sweep in the playoffs. According to his family, Staverman made sure to keep the game ball of the first Pacers game ever played.

He coached the first nine games of the next season before being replaced by Bobby Leonard. He later served as an interim coach for the Kansas City Kings in the 1977–78 season after they had won just thirteen of 37 games to start the year. He went 18–27 as the Kings finished dead last in the Western Conference. He was replaced by Cotton Fitzsimmons as head coach for the next season, although he stayed with the Kings until May 1981, when he resigned organization to join the Cleveland Browns as an assistant to the team president.

== Career playing statistics ==
Legend
GP	Games played	GS	Games started	MPG	Minutes per game
FG%	Field goal percentage	3P%	3-point field goal percentage	FT%	Free throw percentage
RPG	Rebounds per game	APG	Assists per game	SPG	Steals per game
BPG	Blocks per game	PPG	Points per game	**Bold**	Career high

=== NBA ===
==== Regular season ====
Year	Team	GP	MPG	FG%	FT%	RPG	APG	PPG
1958–59	Cincinnati	57	11.9	.470	.763	3.8	.9	4.3
1959–60	Cincinnati	49	9.8	.470	.734	3.7	.7	3.8
1960–61	Cincinnati	**66**	14.3	.446	.849	4.3	**1.3**	4.6
1962–63	Chicago	33	**18.2**	.485	.790	**4.8**	**1.3**	**7.2**
1963–64	Baltimore	6	16.5	.429	**1.000**	2.2	.3	2.7
1963–64	Detroit	20	12.8	**.537**	.667	3.5	.6	5.7
1963–64	Cincinnati	34	9.4	.414	.830	2.8	.5	4.0
Career		265	12.8	.465	.785	3.8	.9	4.7

==== Playoffs ====
Year	Team	GP	MPG	FG%	FT%	RPG	APG	PPG
1963	Cincinnati	7	10.0	.478	.789	3.7	.7	5.3

== Head coaching record ==
=== ABA/NBA ===
Team	Year	G	W	L	W–L%	Finish	PG	PW	PL	PW–L%	Result
Indiana*	1967–68	78	38	40	.487	3rd in Eastern	3	0	3	.000	Lost in Division semifinals
Indiana*	1968–69	9	2	7	.222	Fired mid-season	—	—	—	—	
Kansas City	1977–78	45	18	27	.400	5th in Midwest	—	—	—	—	
Career		132	58	74	.439		3	0	3	.000	
