= 1960–61 Cincinnati Royals season =

NBA professional basketball team season

- Head coach: Charles Wolf
- Owners: Thomas E. Woods
- Arena: Cincinnati Gardens

Results
- Record: 33–46 (.418)
- Place: Division: 4th (Western)
- Playoff finish: Did not qualify
- Stats at Basketball Reference

Local media
- Television: WKRC-TV
- Radio: WKRC

The 1960–61 season was the Royals 13th season in the NBA and its fourth in Cincinnati. The season was defined by the debut of Oscar Robertson. He would win the Rookie of the Year by nearly averaging a triple double for the entire season. The Big O averaged 30.5 points per game, 10.1 rebounds per game and 9.7 assists per game. He was also MVP of the 1961 NBA All-Star Game. Robertson's arrival drew considerable publicity to a team on the verge of folding after the last two brutal seasons. Even a year ago, with the Royals playing before sparse crowds, the mantra was ' Robertson will be here next year '. The Royals actually had four key rookies that year arrive. Along with Robertson, previous #1 pick Bob Boozer, guard Ralph Davis, and college scorer Jay Arnette all arrived to boost the roster. Tom Marshall had served as coach the previous two difficult years. While many thought a bigger NBA name like Red Rocha should now take over, kindly small-college coach Charlie Wolf was inexpensively brought on to aid the young roster. Wolf moved Robertson to lead guard, and the team immediately improved. Jack Twyman, Wayne Embry and Arlen Bockhorn were solid starters in support of the new superstar. Robertson brought a brash leadership to the team, helping to organize the team's attack. The infusion of talented youth overall gave the team a real lift. No ordinary rookie, Robertson scored 30.5 points per game, led the NBA in assists by a clear margin, sank the third-highest number of free throws in the league, and was even second on the Royals in rebounding. He was a 6' 5 player unlike any seen before in the NBA. Robertson's debut was against the now-Los Angeles Lakers in their first game since moving from Minneapolis on October 19. It was also the rookie debut of the Lakers' Jerry West. Robertson triple-doubled in his first NBA game and led the Royals to the highest point total since moving to Cincinnati in the 140–123 win before a large Gardens crowd. Robertson produced large turnouts for the Royals all through November. But the team went 4–13 that month, ending their star's honeymoon. Injuries to the hard-worked Embry saw the team go 6–12 in January, souring the team's playoff chances. Star forward Twyman was the chief target of Robertson passes. Twyman's deadly jumper found the net at 25.3 points per game. The Royals would fall 1 game short of a playoff appearance as they finished in last place with a record of 33 wins and 46 losses.

== Roster ==
1960–61 Cincinnati Royals roster
Players

Pos.	No.	Player	Height	Weight	DOB	From
SG	11	Arlen Bockhorn	6 ft 4 in (1.93 m)	200 lb (91 kg)	1933–07–08	Dayton
PF	13	Bob Boozer	6 ft 8 in (2.03 m)	215 lb (98 kg)	1937–04–26	Kansas State
SG	10	Ralph Davis	6 ft 4 in (1.93 m)	180 lb (82 kg)	1938–09–07	Cincinnati
C	15	Wayne Embry	6 ft 8 in (2.03 m)	240 lb (109 kg)	1937–03–26	Miami (OH)
SF	51	Mike Farmer	6 ft 7 in (2.01 m)	210 lb (95 kg)	1936–09–26	San Francisco
C	16	Phil Jordon	6 ft 10 in (2.08 m)	205 lb (93 kg)	1933–09–12	Whitworth
C	51	Hub Reed	6 ft 9 in (2.06 m)	215 lb (98 kg)	1936–10–04	Oklahoma City
PG	14	Oscar Robertson	6 ft 5 in (1.96 m)	205 lb (93 kg)	1938–11–24	Cincinnati
SG	19	Phil Rollins	6 ft 2 in (1.88 m)	185 lb (84 kg)	1934–01–19	Louisville
PF	21	Larry Staverman	6 ft 7 in (2.01 m)	205 lb (93 kg)	1936–10–11	Thomas More
SF	31	Jack Twyman	6 ft 6 in (1.98 m)	210 lb (95 kg)	1934–05–11	Cincinnati
PG	41	Win Wilfong	6 ft 2 in (1.88 m)	185 lb (84 kg)	1933–03–18	Memphis

Coaches
Head coach
- Charles Wolf

Legend
- (DP) Unsigned draft pick
- (FA) Free agent
- (S) Suspended
- Injured

Roster

== Offseason ==
=== NBA draft ===
Round	Pick	Player	Position	Nationality	School/Club team
1	1	Oscar Robertson		United States	Cincinnati
2	9	Jay Arnette		United States	Texas

Ralph Davis from the University of Cincinnati, a recommended teammate of Robertson, was the team's third pick that year. The team's previous #1 pick from last year, Bob Boozer from Kansas State, reported this year also. He had spent the previous year with the AAU Peoria Caterpillars. Robertson, Boozer and Arnette had all played on the famed 1960 U.S. Olympic team.

== Regular season ==
=== Season standings ===
Western Division	W	L	PCT	GB	Home	Road	Neutral	Div
x-St. Louis Hawks	51	28	.646	–	29–5	15–20	7–3	25–14
x-Los Angeles Lakers	36	43	.456	15	16–12	8–20	12–11	19–20
x-Detroit Pistons	34	45	.430	17	20–11	3–19	11–15	18–21
Cincinnati Royals	33	46	.418	18	18–13	8–19	7–14	16–23

=== Game log ===
1960–61 Game log
#	Date	Opponent	Score	High points	Record
1	October 19	Los Angeles	123–140	Jack Twyman (30)	1–0
2	October 20	@ New York	113–105	Oscar Robertson (28)	2–0
3	October 22	New York	117–119	Phil Jordon (28)	3–0
4	October 23	St. Louis	103–114	Oscar Robertson (32)	4–0
5	October 26	@ Detroit	117–131	Jack Twyman (33)	4–1
6	October 27	Syracuse	140–143 (OT)	Oscar Robertson (39)	5–1
7	October 29	@ St. Louis	97–113	Oscar Robertson (17)	5–2
8	November 1	Philadelphia	131–113	Phil Jordon (18)	5–3
9	November 5	@ Boston	113–104	Oscar Robertson (25)	6–3
10	November 8	Boston	136–120	Jack Twyman (32)	6–4
11	November 11	N Boston	110–128	Jack Twyman (29)	6–5
12	November 12	@ Detroit	112–116	Jack Twyman (25)	6–6
13	November 13	Detroit	125–113	Robertson, Twyman (34)	6–7
14	November 15	Philadelphia	115–124	Oscar Robertson (44)	7–7
15	November 16	@ Syracuse	87–124	Jack Twyman (22)	7–8
16	November 18	St. Louis	128–129 (OT)	Oscar Robertson (36)	8–8
17	November 19	@ St. Louis	120–121	Oscar Robertson (37)	8–9
18	November 20	Boston	120–103	Oscar Robertson (21)	8–10
19	November 22	N Los Angeles	133–118	Phil Jordon (25)	8–11
20	November 23	Los Angeles	118–122	Oscar Robertson (31)	9–11
21	November 24	N Los Angeles	108–100	Jack Twyman (35)	9–12
22	November 26	@ Philadelphia	108–138	Oscar Robertson (26)	9–13
23	November 27	New York	122–118 (OT)	Oscar Robertson (42)	9–14
24	November 29	N Syracuse	129–105	Jack Twyman (31)	9–15
25	December 1	Syracuse	137–126	Oscar Robertson (41)	9–16
26	December 4	N Detroit	116–115	Oscar Robertson (34)	9–17
27	December 6	@ New York	117–112	Jack Twyman (28)	10–17
28	December 7	Los Angeles	112–114	Oscar Robertson (38)	11–17
29	December 8	N Boston	118–115	Robertson, Twyman (36)	12–17
30	December 9	@ Boston	123–146	Jack Twyman (29)	12–18
31	December 13	N Syracuse	107–105	Jack Twyman (37)	12–19
32	December 14	New York	114–121	Arlen Bockhorn (35)	13–19
33	December 16	Los Angeles	116–130	Oscar Robertson (39)	14–19
34	December 18	Philadelphia	128–112	Oscar Robertson (31)	14–20
35	December 20	N Boston	112–115	Jack Twyman (36)	14–21
36	December 25	Detroit	119–126	Oscar Robertson (32)	15–21
37	December 26	@ Detroit	132–137	Oscar Robertson (43)	15–22
38	December 27	Syracuse	124–129	Oscar Robertson (45)	16–22
39	December 28	N New York	104–114	Oscar Robertson (38)	17–22
40	December 29	@ Philadelphia	124–128	Oscar Robertson (36)	17–23
41	December 30	N Philadelphia	130–136	Oscar Robertson (38)	18–23
42	January 1	St. Louis	112–114	Oscar Robertson (28)	19–23
43	January 2	N Syracuse	125–126	Oscar Robertson (42)	20–23
44	January 4	@ Syracuse	134–126	Oscar Robertson (32)	21–23
45	January 5	Boston	125–107	Oscar Robertson (38)	21–24
46	January 10	@ St. Louis	110–119	Oscar Robertson (31)	21–25
47	January 11	@ Detroit	122–126	Oscar Robertson (29)	21–26
48	January 12	N Detroit	124–112	Oscar Robertson (31)	21–27
49	January 14	@ Los Angeles	114–123	Oscar Robertson (45)	21–28
50	January 15	@ Los Angeles	109–105	Jack Twyman (31)	22–28
51	January 18	N Detroit	144–128	Ralph Davis (25)	22–29
52	January 19	New York	129–122	Jack Twyman (34)	22–30
53	January 21	N Detroit	130–106	Jack Twyman (22)	22–31
54	January 22	St. Louis	108–115	Wayne Embry (28)	23–31
55	January 24	Detroit	106–104	Jack Twyman (37)	23–32
56	January 25	@ Detroit	125–138	Jack Twyman (21)	23–33
57	January 27	Syracuse	138–126	Jack Twyman (37)	23–34
58	January 28	@ St. Louis	116–136	Jack Twyman (34)	23–35
59	January 30	Boston	88–116	Jack Twyman (41)	24–35
60	February 2	@ Philadelphia	118–133	Jack Twyman (25)	24–36
61	February 3	N Philadelphia	136–135	Wayne Embry (37)	24–37
62	February 5	@ Syracuse	115–129	Oscar Robertson (38)	24–38
63	February 6	N Los Angeles	110–101	Oscar Robertson (37)	24–39
64	February 9	N New York	115–119	Wayne Embry (23)	25–39
65	February 11	@ St. Louis	122–123	Oscar Robertson (38)	25–40
66	February 12	@ New York	105–104	Oscar Robertson (32)	26–40
67	February 13	N Los Angeles	100–104	Oscar Robertson (40)	27–40
68	February 16	St. Louis	107–133	Oscar Robertson (31)	28–40
69	February 19	Los Angeles	106–112	Oscar Robertson (43)	29–40
70	February 21	@ St. Louis	114–126	Oscar Robertson (36)	29–41
71	February 22	N Philadelphia	132–131	Oscar Robertson (39)	29–42
72	February 25	Philadelphia	129–120	Oscar Robertson (39)	29–43
73	February 26	St. Louis	148–122	Jack Twyman (25)	29–44
74	February 28	N St. Louis	105–131	Jack Twyman (24)	30–44
75	March 1	Detroit	122–137	Oscar Robertson (37)	31–44
76	March 5	@ New York	124–118	Robertson, Twyman (27)	32–44
77	March 7	N Boston	121–124	Oscar Robertson (32)	32–45
78	March 11	@ Los Angeles	108–105	Jack Twyman (23)	33–45
79	March 12	@ Los Angeles	122–123	Oscar Robertson (38)	33–46

== Player statistics ==
Legend
GP	Games played	GS	Games started	MPG	Minutes per game
FG%	Field-goal percentage	3P%	3-point field-goal percentage	FT%	Free-throw percentage
RPG	Rebounds per game	APG	Assists per game	SPG	Steals per game
BPG	Blocks per game	PPG	Points per game

Player	GP	GS	MPG	FG%	3FG%	FT%	RPG	APG	SPG	BPG	PPG
Arlen Bockhorn											
Bob Boozer											
Ralph Davis											
Wayne Embry											
Mike Farmer											
Phil Jordon											
Hub Reed											
Oscar Robertson											
Phil Rollins											
Larry Staverman											
Jack Twyman											
Win Wilfong											

== Awards and honors ==
- Oscar Robertson, 1960–61 NBA Rookie Of The Year, First Team All-NBA selection, MVP of the 1961 NBA All-Star Game.
- Jack Twyman, NBA- All-Star, top ten NBA scorer.
