= Phil Jordon =

American professional basketball player

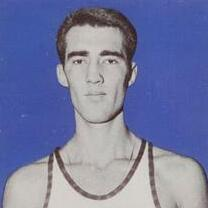
- Jordon c. 1961

Personal information
- Born: September 12, 1933 Lakeport, California, U.S.
- Died: June 7, 1965 (aged 31) Sumner, Washington, U.S.
- Listed height: 6 ft 10 in (2.08 m)
- Listed weight: 205 lb (93 kg)

Career information
- High school: Willits (Willits, California)
- College: Whitworth (1952–1955)
- NBA draft: 1956: 6th round, 42nd overall pick
- Drafted by: Minneapolis Lakers
- Playing career: 1956–1963
- Position: Power forward / center
- Number: 18, 16, 8, 29

Career history
- 1956–1957: New York Knicks
- 1957–1959: Detroit Pistons
- 1959–1961: Cincinnati Royals
- 1961–1962: New York Knicks
- 1962–1963: St. Louis Hawks

Career NBA statistics
- Points: 4,833 (10.9 ppg)
- Rebounds: 3,028 (6.9 rpg)
- Assists: 769 (1.7 apg)
- Stats at NBA.com
- Stats at Basketball Reference

Philip Jordon (September 12, 1933 – June 7, 1965) was an American professional basketball player. He played seven seasons in the National Basketball Association (NBA).

== Professional career ==
A 6'10" center from Whitworth University, Jordon played seven seasons (1956–1963) in the National Basketball Association as a member of the New York Knicks, Detroit Pistons, Cincinnati Royals, and St. Louis Hawks. He averaged 10.9 points per game and 6.9 rebounds per game in his career.

Jordon was a member of the Knicks' team that surrendered 100 points to the Philadelphia Warriors' Wilt Chamberlain on March 2, 1962, but he missed the game due to what was officially reported as influenza. Although it is speculated that Jordon was also suffering from a hangover, this claim has been disputed by Knicks teammate Willie Naulls. His absence is often cited as a reason for Chamberlain's high point total since it left the Knicks with only one player, Darrall Imhoff, large enough to guard Chamberlain.

== Personal life ==
Jordon drowned after a rafting accident in Washington on June 7, 1965. His raft, which was carrying four men, broke apart, and his body was discovered floating in Puget Sound on June 27.

Jordon was of Wailaki and the Nomlaki Native American descent. His son, Jon Jordon, played for Central Washington University.

He was raised by his parents, Johnny Jordon and Elizabeth Jordan. Phil had three brothers, all 6'4 tall and his sister Shirley, 6'.

It has been speculated that Jordon was the first NBA player with visible tattoos, which were on both upper arms.

== Career statistics ==
Legend
GP	Games played	GS	Games started	MPG	Minutes per game
FG%	Field goal percentage	3P%	3-point field goal percentage	FT%	Free throw percentage
RPG	Rebounds per game	APG	Assists per game	SPG	Steals per game
BPG	Blocks per game	PPG	Points per game	**Bold**	Career high
*	Led the league

=== NBA ===
==== Regular season ====
Year	Team	GP	MPG	FG%	FT%	RPG	APG	PPG
1956–57	New York	9	10.1	.367	.667	3.8	.2	4.9
1957–58	New York	12	6.3	**.471**	**.833**	2.0	.4	3.1
1957–58	Detroit	46	17.9	.409	.678	6.0	.7	9.0
1958–59	Detroit	72*	28.6	.413	.762	8.3	1.2	**14.3**
1959–60	Cincinnati	75	27.5	.393	.716	8.3	**2.8**	13.4
1960–61	Cincinnati	**48***	23.8	.395	.731	**8.8**	2.2	10.9
1960–61	New York	**31***	**29.8**	.374	.701	8.1	2.4	13.1
1961–62	New York	76	28.9	.392	.571	6.3	2.1	11.9
1962–63	St. Louis	73	19.5	.400	.554	4.4	1.4	6.5
Career		442	24.4	.398	.694	6.9	1.7	10.9

==== Playoffs ====
Year	Team	GP	MPG	FG%	FT%	RPG	APG	PPG
1958	Detroit	6	10.3	**.400**	.750	2.0	.3	6.5
1959	Detroit	3	**33.0**	.333	**.833**	**8.0**	**1.7**	**15.0**
1963	St. Louis	**7**	11.7	.375	.750	2.1	1.0	3.0
Career		16	15.2	.364	.786	3.2	.9	6.6
