= 1959–60 Cincinnati Royals season =

NBA professional basketball team season

- Head coach: Tom Marshall
- Owners: Thomas E. Woods
- Arena: Cincinnati Gardens

Results
- Record: 19–56 (.253)
- Place: Division: 4th (Western)
- Playoff finish: Did not qualify
- Stats at Basketball Reference

Local media
- Television: WKRC-TV
- Radio: WKRC

The 1959–60 Cincinnati Royal season was the 15th season of the franchise, its 12th season in the NBA and third season in Cincinnati.

== Regular season ==
=== Season standings ===
Western Division	Wins	Losses	PCT	GB	Home	Road	Neutral	Division
x-St. Louis Hawks	46	29	.613	–	28–5	12–20	6–4	27–12
x-Detroit Pistons	30	45	.400	16	17–14	6–21	7–10	20–19
x-Minneapolis Lakers	25	50	.333	21	9–15	9–21	7–14	17–22
Cincinnati Royals	19	56	.253	27	9–22	2–20	8–14	14–25

x – clinched playoff spot

=== Game log ===
1959–60 Game log
#	Date	Opponent	Score	High points	Record
1	October 17	@ Boston	125–129	Jack Twyman (38)	0–1
2	October 24	Detroit	103–108	Jack Twyman (39)	1–1
3	October 25	Minneapolis	102–103	Jack Twyman (37)	2–1
4	October 30	Syracuse	136–127	Jack Twyman (47)	2–2
5	October 31	@ St. Louis	102–109	Jack Twyman (35)	2–3
6	November 1	Boston	124–109	Jack Twyman (31)	2–4
7	November 7	N Syracuse	101–103	Jack Twyman (30)	3–4
8	November 8	@ Philadelphia	106–134	Jack Twyman (21)	3–5
9	November 11	@ Boston	118–151	Jack Twyman (49)	3–6
10	November 12	Philadelphia	124–116	Jack Twyman (32)	3–7
11	November 14	@ Detroit	103–111	Jack Twyman (31)	3–8
12	November 15	Boston	134–128	Arlen Bockhorn (25)	3–9
13	November 17	N Syracuse	121–116	Jack Twyman (38)	3–10
14	November 18	N Detroit	110–93	Wayne Embry (18)	3–11
15	November 19	New York	130–109	Jack Twyman (25)	3–12
16	November 21	Minneapolis	99–93 (OT)	Jack Twyman (27)	3–13
17	November 22	St. Louis	100–106	Jack Twyman (25)	4–13
18	November 24	N Detroit	104–91	Jack Twyman (20)	4–14
19	November 26	Minneapolis	95–114	Jack Twyman (35)	5–14
20	November 28	Syracuse	111–105	Jack Twyman (35)	5–15
21	December 2	N New York	118–135	Jack Twyman (39)	6–15
22	December 3	N Boston	111–114	Jack Twyman (32)	6–16
23	December 6	St. Louis	118–104	Jack Twyman (23)	6–17
24	December 8	N St. Louis	101–105	Jack Twyman (33)	7–17
25	December 9	N Detroit	119–129	Jack Twyman (38)	8–17
26	December 10	@ Philadelphia	112–131	Jack Twyman (29)	8–18
27	December 12	@ Minneapolis	107–97	Jack Twyman (37)	9–18
28	December 13	@ St. Louis	98–118	Jack Twyman (19)	9–19
29	December 15	N Philadelphia	131–107	Jack Twyman (31)	9–20
30	December 16	Philadelphia	114–105	Jack Twyman (34)	9–21
31	December 19	Minneapolis	131–113	Jack Twyman (27)	9–22
32	December 20	@ New York	118–132	Jack Twyman (25)	9–23
33	December 22	N New York	127–119	Jack Twyman (35)	9–24
34	December 25	Detroit	103–121	Arlen Bockhorn (27)	10–24
35	December 27	Boston	122–111	Jack Twyman (41)	10–25
36	December 28	N Philadelphia	109–104	Jack Twyman (34)	10–26
37	December 30	Syracuse	131–127	Jack Twyman (35)	10–27
38	January 1	N Boston	128–115	Jack Twyman (40)	11–27
39	January 2	New York	126–118	Jack Twyman (42)	11–28
40	January 3	@ Detroit	112–114	Jack Twyman (28)	11–29
41	January 6	N New York	113–129	Jack Twyman (30)	12–29
42	January 7	@ Syracuse	114–132	Jack Twyman (20)	12–30
43	January 8	St. Louis	102–112	Jack Twyman (43)	13–30
44	January 9	@ Minneapolis	91–121	Jack Twyman (24)	13–31
45	January 10	Minneapolis	112–106	Jack Twyman (29)	13–32
46	January 12	New York	141–123	Wayne Embry (24)	13–33
47	January 15	Minneapolis	118–122	Jack Twyman (59)	14–33
48	January 16	@ New York	106–132	Phil Jordon (17)	14–34
49	January 17	@ Detroit	110–115	Jack Twyman (36)	14–35
50	January 20	St. Louis	119–108	Jack Twyman (37)	14–36
51	January 23	@ St. Louis	100–108	Jack Twyman (21)	14–37
52	January 24	Philadelphia	104–95	Jordon, Wilfong (17)	14–38
53	January 27	N Minneapolis	116–112	Jack Twyman (31)	14–39
54	January 29	N New York	128–113	Jack Twyman (29)	14–40
55	January 30	N Boston	107–129	Jack Twyman (33)	14–41
56	February 2	@ Philadelphia	107–109	Jack Twyman (30)	14–42
57	February 3	@ Detroit	105–117	Jack Twyman (25)	14–43
58	February 4	Detroit	121–102	Jack Twyman (34)	14–44
59	February 7	@ Syracuse	112–135	Wayne Embry (23)	14–45
60	February 9	N Syracuse	117–111	Jack Twyman (37)	14–46
61	February 10	St. Louis	120–110	Jack Twyman (35)	14–47
62	February 11	@ Minneapolis	111–108	Arlen Bockhorn (31)	15–47
63	February 12	N Detroit	101–133	Jack Twyman (38)	16–47
64	February 14	@ St. Louis	105–107	Jack Twyman (28)	16–48
65	February 16	Philadelphia	117–112	Phil Jordon (22)	16–49
66	February 20	Detroit	107–110	Jack Twyman (40)	17–49
67	February 21	Boston	115–108	Jack Twyman (27)	17–50
68	February 23	Syracuse	133–135	Jack Twyman (42)	18–50
69	February 24	N St. Louis	122–124	Jack Twyman (33)	19–50
70	February 25	N Minneapolis	105–95	Jack Twyman (37)	19–51
71	February 28	@ St. Louis	105–122	Arlen Bockhorn (23)	19–52
72	March 1	N Detroit	108–106	Jack Twyman (38)	19–53
73	March 3	N Minneapolis	117–114	Jack Twyman (35)	19–54
74	March 6	@ Minneapolis	105–114	Jack Twyman (36)	19–55
75	March 9	St. Louis	123–116	Jack Twyman (35)	19–56

== Player statistics ==
Legend
GP	Games played	GS	Games started	MPG	Minutes per game
FG%	Field-goal percentage	3P%	3-point field-goal percentage	FT%	Free-throw percentage
RPG	Rebounds per game	APG	Assists per game	SPG	Steals per game
BPG	Blocks per game	PPG	Points per game

Player	GP	GS	MPG	FG%	3FG%	FT%	RPG	APG	SPG	BPG	PPG
Arlen Bockhorn											
Wayne Embry											
Dave Gambee											
Phil Jordon											
Jim Palmer											
Med Park											
Dave Piontek											
Hub Reed											
Phil Rollins											
Larry Staverman											
Wayne Stevens											
Jack Twyman											
Win Wilfong											
