= Charles Wolf (basketball) =

American basketball coach (1926–2022)

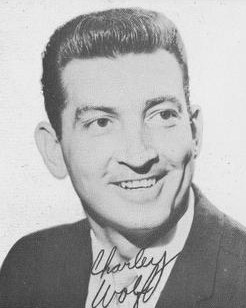

Personal information
- Born: May 7, 1926 Covington, Kentucky, U.S.
- Died: November 26, 2022 (aged 96)

Career information
- High school: St. Xavier (Cincinnati, Ohio)
- College: Notre Dame (1946–1947)

Career history

Coaching
- 1954–1960: Thomas More
- 1960–1963: Cincinnati Royals
- 1963–1964: Detroit Pistons

Charles Anthony Wolf (May 7, 1926 – November 26, 2022) was an American professional basketball coach. He coached two National Basketball Association (NBA) teams: the Cincinnati Royals from 1960 through 1963 and the Detroit Pistons from 1963 through 1964.

While living in Fort Thomas, Kentucky, Wolf graduated from St. Xavier High School in Cincinnati in 1944 and from Xavier University. He coached basketball at Villa Madonna College (now Thomas More University) before becoming an NBA coach.

Wolf died on November 26, 2022, at the age of 96. He had six sons, including Steve Wolf, a college basketball analyst for CBS Sports Network. His grandson J. J. Wolf is a professional tennis player.

== Head coaching record ==
Team	Year	G	W	L	W–L%	Finish	PG	PW	PL	PW–L%	Result
Cincinnati	1960–61	79	33	46	.418	4th in Western	—	—	—	—	Missed playoffs
Cincinnati	1961–62	80	43	37	.538	2nd in Western	4	1	3	.250	Lost Division semifinals
Cincinnati	1962–63	80	42	38	.525	3rd in Western	12	6	6	.500	Lost Division finals
Detroit	1963–64	80	23	57	.288	5th in Western	—	—	—	—	Missed playoffs
Detroit	1964–65	11	2	9	.182	left mid-season	—	—	—	—	—
Career		330	143	187	.433		16	7	9	.438	
