= 1960–61 NBA season =

15th NBA season

- League: National Basketball Association
- Sport: Basketball
- Duration: October 19, 1960 – March 12, 1961; March 14 – April 1, 1961 (Playoffs); April 2–11, 1961 (Finals)
- Games: 79
- Teams: 8
- TV partner: NBC

Draft
- Top draft pick: Oscar Robertson
- Picked by: Cincinnati Royals

Regular season
- Top seed: Boston Celtics
- Season MVP: Bill Russell (Boston)
- Top scorer: Wilt Chamberlain (Philadelphia)

Playoffs
- Eastern champions: Boston Celtics
- Eastern runners-up: Syracuse Nationals
- Western champions: St. Louis Hawks
- Western runners-up: Los Angeles Lakers

Finals
- Champions: Boston Celtics
- Runners-up: St. Louis Hawks

NBA seasons
- ← 1959–60 1961–62 →

The 1960–61 NBA season was the 15th season of the National Basketball Association. The season ended with the Boston Celtics winning their third straight NBA championship, beating the St. Louis Hawks 4 games to 1 in the NBA Finals.

== Notable occurrences ==
- The Lakers relocate from Minneapolis, Minnesota to Los Angeles. They would play for seven seasons in the Los Angeles Memorial Sports Arena.
- The NBA schedule expanded again, this time from 75 games per team to 79.
- The 1961 NBA All-Star Game was played in Syracuse, New York, with the West beating the East 153–131. Rookie Oscar Robertson of the Cincinnati Royals won the game's MVP award.

Coaching changes
Offseason
Team	1959–60 coach	1960–61 coach
Syracuse Nationals	Paul Seymour	Alex Hannum
Cincinnati Royals	Tom Marshall	Charles Wolf
Los Angeles/Minneapolis Lakers	Jim Pollard	Fred Schaus
St. Louis Hawks	Ed Macauley	Paul Seymour

== Final standings ==
=== Eastern Division ===
Eastern Division	W	L	PCT	GB	Home	Road	Neutral	Div
x-Boston Celtics	57	22	.722	–	21–7	24–11	12–4	28–11
x-Philadelphia Warriors	46	33	.582	11	23–6	12–21	11–6	22–17
x-Syracuse Nationals	38	41	.481	19	19–9	8–21	11–11	18–21
New York Knicks	21	58	.266	36	10–22	7–25	4–11	10–29

=== Western Division ===
Western Division	W	L	PCT	GB	Home	Road	Neutral	Div
x-St. Louis Hawks	51	28	.646	–	29–5	15–20	7–3	25–14
x-Los Angeles Lakers	36	43	.456	15	16–12	8–20	12–11	19–20
x-Detroit Pistons	34	45	.430	17	20–11	3–19	11–15	18–21
Cincinnati Royals	33	46	.418	18	18–13	8–19	7–14	16–23

x – clinched playoff spot

== Playoffs ==
Division Semifinals
E3	Syracuse	3
E2	Philadelphia	0
W3	Detroit	2
W2	Los Angeles	3

Division Finals
Eastern Division
E1	Boston*	4
E3	Syracuse	1
Western Division
W1	St. Louis*	4
W2	Los Angeles	3

NBA Finals
E1	Boston*	4
W1	St. Louis*	1

- * Division winner
- Bold Series winner
- Italic Team with home-court advantage in NBA Finals

== Statistics leaders ==
Category	Player	Team	Stat
Points	Wilt Chamberlain	Philadelphia Warriors	3,033
Rebounds	Wilt Chamberlain	Philadelphia Warriors	2,149
Assists	Oscar Robertson	Cincinnati Royals	690
FG%	Wilt Chamberlain	Philadelphia Warriors	.509
FT%	Bill Sharman	Boston Celtics	.921

Note: Prior to the 1969–70 season, league leaders in points, rebounds, and assists were determined by totals rather than averages.

== NBA awards ==
- Most Valuable Player: Bill Russell, Boston Celtics
- Rookie of the Year: Oscar Robertson, Cincinnati Royals
- All-NBA First Team:
  - F – Elgin Baylor, Los Angeles Lakers
  - F – Bob Pettit, St. Louis Hawks
  - C – Wilt Chamberlain, Philadelphia Warriors
  - G – Bob Cousy, Boston Celtics
  - G – Oscar Robertson, Cincinnati Royals
- All-NBA Second Team:
  - F – Tom Heinsohn, Boston Celtics
  - F – Dolph Schayes, Syracuse Nationals
  - C – Bill Russell, Boston Celtics
  - G – Larry Costello, Syracuse Nationals
  - G – Gene Shue, Detroit Pistons

== See also ==
- List of NBA regular season records
