= Los Angeles Lakers accomplishments and records =

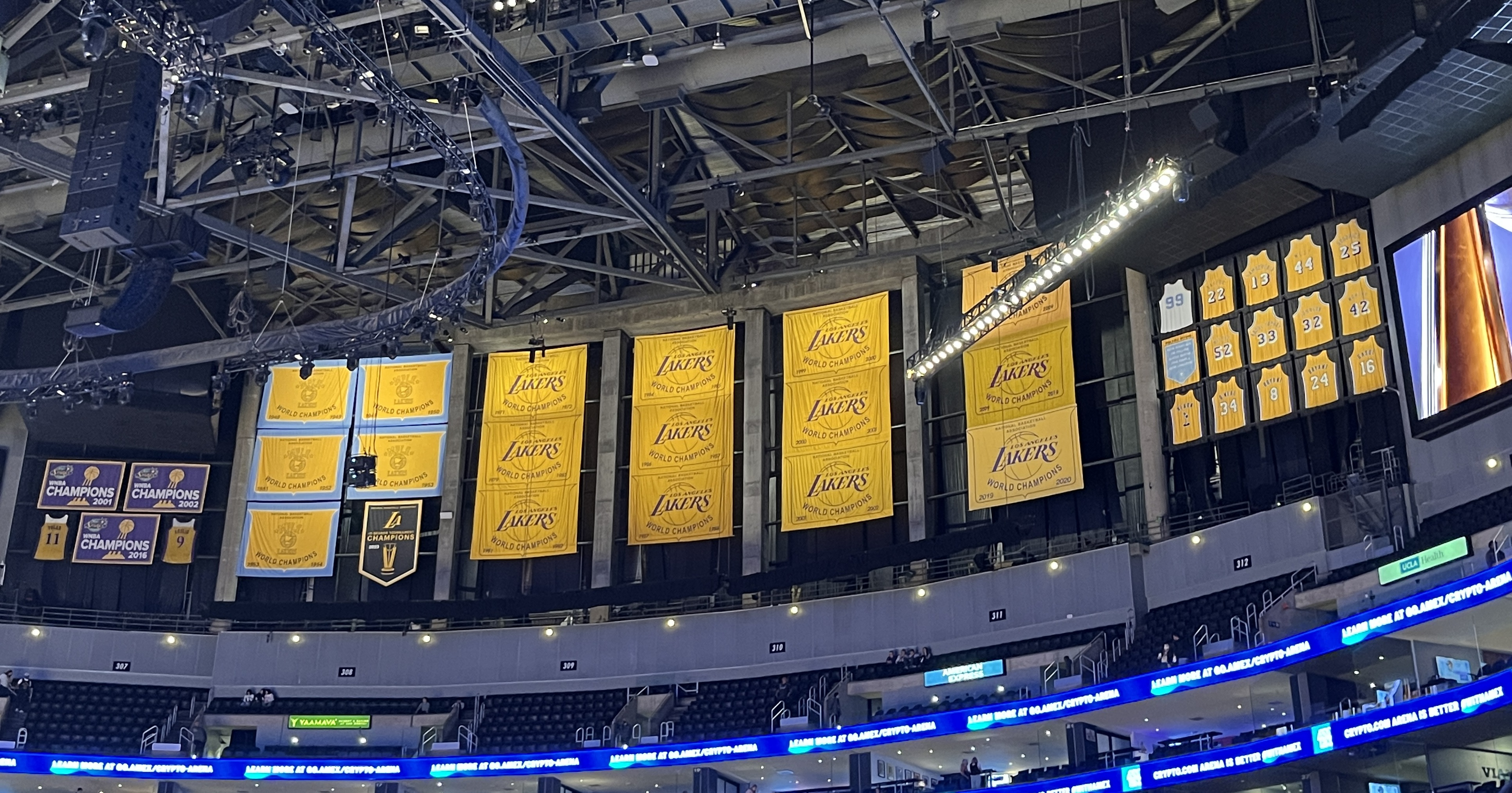
Championship banners, Lakers retired jerseys, and honored Minneapolis Lakers banner hanging in the rafters of Crypto.com Arena

This page details the all-time statistics, records, and other achievements pertaining to the Los Angeles Lakers. The Los Angeles Lakers are an American professional basketball team currently playing in the National Basketball Association.

== Championships ==
=== League championships ===
- Basketball Association of America (1): 1949
- National Basketball Association (16): 1950, 1952, 1953, 1954, 1972, 1980, 1982, 1985, 1987, 1988, 2000, 2001, 2002, 2009, 2010, 2020
- National Basketball League (1): 1948

Note: The NBA counts championships won in the BAA along with its own.

=== Tournament championships ===
- McDonald's Championship (1): 1991
- NBA Cup (1): 2023
- World Professional Basketball Tournament (1): 1948

== Laker individual accomplishments ==
=== BAA/NBA ===
NBA MVP

- Kareem Abdul-Jabbar – 1976, 1977, 1980
- Magic Johnson – 1987, 1989, 1990
- Shaquille O'Neal – 2000
- Kobe Bryant – 2008

NBA Finals MVP

- Jerry West – 1969
- Wilt Chamberlain – 1972
- Magic Johnson – 1980, 1982, 1987
- Kareem Abdul-Jabbar – 1985
- James Worthy – 1988
- Shaquille O'Neal – 2000, 2001, 2002
- Kobe Bryant – 2009, 2010
- LeBron James – 2020

NBA Cup MVP

- LeBron James – 2023

NBA Defensive Player of the Year

- Michael Cooper – 1987

NBA Coach of the Year

- Bill Sharman – 1972
- Pat Riley – 1990
- Del Harris – 1995

NBA Sixth Man of the Year

- Lamar Odom – 2011

NBA Executive of the Year

- Jerry West – 1995

Rookie of the Year

- Elgin Baylor – 1959

NBA All-Rookie First Team

- Bill Hewitt – 1969
- Dick Garrett – 1970
- Jim Price – 1973
- Brian Winters – 1975
- Norm Nixon – 1978
- Magic Johnson – 1980
- James Worthy – 1983
- Byron Scott – 1984
- Vlade Divac – 1990
- Eddie Jones – 1995
- Jordan Clarkson – 2015
- Kyle Kuzma – 2018

NBA All-Rookie Second Team

- Nick Van Exel – 1994
- Kobe Bryant – 1997
- Travis Knight – 1997
- D'Angelo Russell – 2016
- Brandon Ingram – 2017
- Lonzo Ball – 2018

J. Walter Kennedy Citizenship Award

- Michael Cooper – 1986
- Magic Johnson – 1992
- Ron Artest – 2011
- Pau Gasol – 2012

NBA Community Assist Award

- Pau Gasol – 2012

NBA scoring champion

- George Mikan – 1949–1951
- Jerry West – 1970
- Shaquille O'Neal – 2000
- Kobe Bryant – 2006, 2007

NBA assist leaders

- Jerry West – 1972
- Magic Johnson – 1983, 1984, 1986, 1987
- LeBron James – 2020

All-NBA First Team

- George Mikan – 1949–1954
- Jim Pollard – 1949, 1950
- Elgin Baylor – 1959–1965, 1967–1969
- Jerry West – 1962–1967, 1970–1973
- Gail Goodrich – 1974
- Kareem Abdul-Jabbar – 1976, 1977, 1980, 1981, 1984, 1986
- Magic Johnson – 1983–1991
- Shaquille O'Neal – 1998, 2000–2004
- Kobe Bryant – 2002–2004, 2006–2013
- Anthony Davis – 2020
- LeBron James – 2020
- Luka Dončić – 2026

All-NBA Second Team

- Vern Mikkelsen – 1951–1953, 1955
- Jim Pollard – 1952, 1954
- Slater Martin – 1955, 1956
- Clyde Lovellette – 1956
- Dick Garmaker – 1957
- Jerry West – 1968, 1969
- Wilt Chamberlain – 1972
- Kareem Abdul-Jabbar – 1978, 1979, 1983, 1985
- Magic Johnson – 1982
- Shaquille O'Neal – 1999
- Kobe Bryant – 2000, 2001
- Pau Gasol – 2011
- Andrew Bynum – 2012
- LeBron James – 2021, 2025
- Anthony Davis – 2024

All-NBA Third Team

- James Worthy – 1990, 1991
- Shaquille O'Neal – 1997
- Kobe Bryant – 1999, 2005
- Pau Gasol – 2009, 2010
- Dwight Howard – 2013
- LeBron James – 2019, 2022–2024

NBA All-Defensive First Team

- Jerry West – 1970–1973
- Wilt Chamberlain – 1972, 1973
- Kareem Abdul-Jabbar – 1979–1981
- Michael Cooper – 1982, 1984, 1985, 1987, 1988
- Kobe Bryant – 2000, 2003, 2004, 2006–2011
- Anthony Davis – 2020, 2024

NBA All-Defensive Second Team

- Jerry West – 1969
- Kareem Abdul-Jabbar – 1976–1978, 1984
- Michael Cooper – 1981, 1983, 1986
- A.C. Green – 1989
- Eddie Jones – 1998
- Shaquille O'Neal – 2000, 2001, 2003
- Kobe Bryant – 2001, 2002, 2012

NBA 25th Anniversary Team

- George Mikan – 1947–1954, 1956

NBA 35th Anniversary Team

- George Mikan – 1947–1954, 1956
- Kareem Abdul-Jabbar – 1975–1989
- Elgin Baylor – 1958–1971
- Wilt Chamberlain – 1968–1973
- Jerry West – 1960–1974

NBA 50th Anniversary Team

- Kareem Abdul-Jabbar – 1975–1989
- Elgin Baylor – 1958–1971
- Wilt Chamberlain – 1968–1973
- Jerry West – 1960–1974
- George Mikan – 1947–1954, 1956
- Magic Johnson – 1979–1991, 1996
- Karl Malone – 2003–2004
- Shaquille O'Neal – 1996–2004
- James Worthy – 1982–1994

NBA 75th Anniversary Team

- Kareem Abdul-Jabbar – 1975–1989
- Elgin Baylor – 1958–1971
- Kobe Bryant – 1996–2016
- Wilt Chamberlain – 1968–1973
- Anthony Davis – 2019–present
- LeBron James – 2018–present
- Magic Johnson – 1979–1991, 1996
- Karl Malone – 2003–2004
- Bob McAdoo – 1981–1985
- George Mikan – 1947–1954, 1956
- Steve Nash – 2012–2015
- Shaquille O'Neal – 1996–2004
- Gary Payton – 2003–2004
- Dennis Rodman – 1999
- Jerry West – 1960–1974
- James Worthy – 1982–1994
- Russell Westbrook – 2021–2023
- Carmelo Anthony – 2021–2022

==== NBA All-Star Weekend ====
NBA All-Star Selections

- George Mikan – 1951–1954
- Vern Mikkelsen – 1951–1953, 1955–1957
- Jim Pollard – 1951, 1952, 1954, 1955
- Slater Martin – 1953–1957
- Clyde Lovellette – 1956
- Dick Garmaker – 1957–1960
- Larry Foust – 1958, 1959
- Elgin Baylor – 1959–1965, 1967–1970
- Rod Hundley – 1960, 1961
- Jerry West – 1961–1974
- Frank Selvy – 1962
- Rudy LaRusso – 1962, 1963, 1966
- Darrall Imhoff – 1967
- Archie Clark – 1968
- Wilt Chamberlain – 1969, 1971–1973
- Gail Goodrich – 1972–1975
- Kareem Abdul-Jabbar – 1976, 1977, 1979–1989
- Magic Johnson – 1980, 1982–1992
- Jamaal Wilkes – 1981, 1983
- Norm Nixon – 1982
- James Worthy – 1986–1992
- A.C. Green – 1990
- Cedric Ceballos – 1995
- Shaquille O'Neal – 1997, 1998, 2000–2004
- Eddie Jones – 1997, 1998
- Kobe Bryant – 1998, 2000–2016
- Nick Van Exel – 1998
- Pau Gasol – 2009–2011
- Andrew Bynum – 2012
- Dwight Howard – 2013
- LeBron James – 2019–2026
- Anthony Davis – 2020, 2021, 2024, 2025
- Luka Doncic - 2026
- No All-Star game in 1999, due to a lockout that shortened the season.

All-Star Most Valuable Player

- George Mikan – 1953
- Elgin Baylor – 1959
- Jerry West – 1972
- Magic Johnson – 1990, 1992
- Shaquille O'Neal – 2000, 2004
- Kobe Bryant – 2002, 2007, 2009, 2011

Slam Dunk champion

- Kobe Bryant – 1997

All-Star Rookie/Sophomore Challenge Game

- Nick Van Exel – 1994
- Eddie Jones – 1995*
- Kobe Bryant – 1997
- Derek Fisher – 1997
- Travis Knight – 1997
- Andrew Bynum – 2007
- Jordan Farmar – 2007, 2008
- Jordan Clarkson – 2016
- D'Angelo Russell – 2016, 2017
- Brandon Ingram – 2017, 2018
- Kyle Kuzma – 2018, 2019
- Lonzo Ball – 2018, 2019

NBA All-Star Game head coaches

- John Kundla – 1951–1954
- Fred Schaus – 1962–1964, 1966–1967
- Bill Sharman – 1972–1973
- Pat Riley – 1982–1983, 1985–1990
- Phil Jackson – 2000, 2009
- Frank Vogel – 2020

=== NBL ===
NBL MVP

- George Mikan – 1948

=== Other tournaments ===
McDonald's Open MVP

- Magic Johnson – 1991

McDonald's Open All-tournament team

- Magic Johnson – 1991
- Vlade Divac – 1991
- Byron Scott – 1991
- James Worthy – 1991

World Professional Basketball Tournament MVP

- George Mikan – 1948

World Professional Basketball Tournament All-tournament team

- George Mikan – 1948
- Jim Pollard – 1948
- Herm Schaefer – 1948

=== Los Angeles Lakers Basketball Hall of Famers ===
See Los Angeles Lakers#Hall of Famers and Naismith Memorial Basketball Hall of Fame

- 4 Adrian Dantley
- 7 Carmelo Anthony
- 8/24 Kobe Bryant
- 10 Steve Nash
- 11 Bob McAdoo
- 11 Karl Malone
- 11 Charlie Scott
- 12 Vlade Divac
- 12/39 Dwight Howard
- 13 Wilt Chamberlain
- 16 Pau Gasol
- 17 Jim Pollard
- 19 Vern Mikkelsen
- 20 Gary Payton
- 21 Michael Cooper
- 22 Elgin Baylor
- 22 Slater Martin
- 23 Lou Hudson
- 23 Mitch Richmond
- 25 Gail Goodrich
- 31 Spencer Haywood
- 31 Zelmo Beaty
- 32 Magic Johnson
- 33 Kareem Abdul-Jabbar
- 34 Clyde Lovellette
- 34 Shaquille O'Neal
- 42 Connie Hawkins
- 42 James Worthy
- 44 Jerry West
- 52 Jamaal Wilkes
- 73 Dennis Rodman
- 99 George Mikan
- Coach Bill Sharman
- Coach John Kundla
- Coach Pat Riley
- Coach Phil Jackson
- Assistant coach Tex Winter
- Coach Rudy Tomjanovich
- Coach Mike D'Antoni
- MIC Chick Hearn
- General Manager Pete Newell
- Owner Jerry Buss

=== Retired jerseys ===
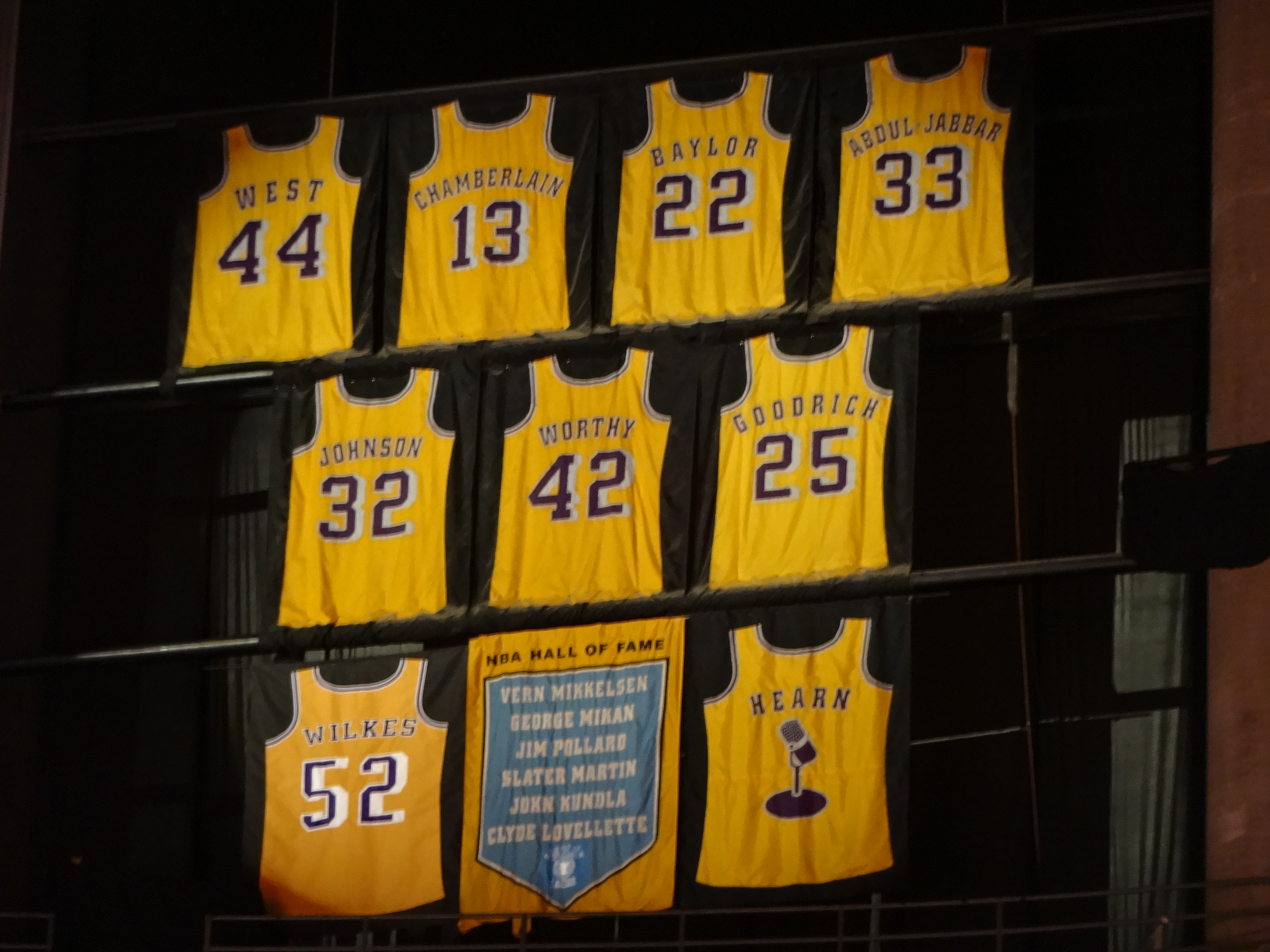
Lakers retired jerseys hanging inside the Staples Center, January 2013

- 8 Kobe Bryant, G, 1996–2006
- 13 Wilt Chamberlain, C, 1968–1973
- 16 Pau Gasol, C, 2008–2014
- 21 Michael Cooper, G, 1978-1990
- 22 Elgin Baylor, F, 1958–71 (including team's last two seasons in Minneapolis)
- 24 Kobe Bryant, G, 2006–2016
- 25 Gail Goodrich, G, 1965–68 and 1970–76
- 32 Magic Johnson, G, 1979–91 and 1995–96; Head Coach 1994
- 33 Kareem Abdul-Jabbar, C, 1975–89
- 34 Shaquille O'Neal, C, 1996–2004
- 42 James Worthy, F, 1982–94
- 44 Jerry West, G, 1960–74; Head Coach, 1976–79; General Manager, 1981–2002
- 52 Jamaal Wilkes, F, 1977–85
- 99 George Mikan, C, 1947–56 (did not play in 1954–55)
- MIC Chick Hearn, Broadcaster, 1960–2002

The NBA announced on August 12, 2022, that no. 6 would be retired league-wide in honor of Bill Russell. Current players wearing no. 6, such as the Lakers' LeBron James, would be grandfathered by the rule.

Honored Minneapolis Lakers: Next to their retired numbers, the Lakers have hung a banner with the names of five Hall-of-Famers who were instrumental to the franchise's success during its days in Minneapolis:

- 17 Jim Pollard, F, 1947–55
- 19 Vern Mikkelsen, F, 1949–59
- 22 Slater Martin, G, 1949–56
- 34 Clyde Lovellette, F-C, 1953–57
- John Kundla, Coach, 1947–59

No. 22 jersey was retired for Elgin Baylor; 34 was retired for Shaquille O'Neal in April 2013; 17 was previously worn by Andrew Bynum and Rick Fox, and 19 is currently not being worn.

=== Olympic team selection ===
- (United States) Clyde Lovellette – 1952
- (United States) Jerry West – 1960
- (United States) Walt Hazzard – 1964
- (United States) Magic Johnson – 1992
- (United States) Shaquille O'Neal – 1996
- (United States) Kobe Bryant – 2008 2012
- (Spain) Pau Gasol – 2008 2012
- (United States) Anthony Davis – 2024
- (United States) LeBron James – 2024

== NBA regular season records set/tied by Los Angeles Lakers ==
=== Minneapolis/Los Angeles Lakers Accomplishments & Records ===
- Most consecutive games won – 33, 1971-11-05 – 1972-01-07
- Most consecutive games won, one season – 33, 1971-11-05 – 1972-01-07
- Highest winning percentage, road games, season – .816, 1971–72 (31–7)
- Most consecutive road games won – 16, 1971-11-06 – 1972-01-07
- Most consecutive overtime games, season – 3, 1991-11-01 – 1991-11-05
  - shared with 15 other teams
- Fewest opponent points, first half – 19, vs. L.A. Clippers, 1999-12-14
- Fewest opponent points, second quarter – 3, vs. L.A. Clippers, 1999-12-14
- Fewest opponent points, third quarter – 2, vs. Dallas, 1997-04-06
- Fewest points, overtime period – 0, vs. Detroit, 1989-12-01
  - shared with seven other teams
- Most players, 2,000-or-more points, season – 2, 1964–65 (West 2,292; Baylor 2,009)
  - shared with four other teams
- Most players, 40-or-more points, game – 2, at San Francisco, 1970-02-11 (Baylor 43, West 43)
  - shared with eight other teams
- Highest field goal percentage, season – .545, 1984–85 (3,952/7,254)
- Lowest opponent field goal percentage, game – .229, vs. Milwaukee Hawks (at Buffalo, New York), 1954-11-06 (22/96)
- Lowest field goal percentage, both teams, game – .246, Milwaukee Hawks vs. Minneapolis (at Buffalo, New York), 1954-11-06 (48/195)
- Most field goals, both teams, one quarter – 40, Boston (23) vs. Minneapolis (17), 1959-02-27 (4th qtr.)
- Most field goal attempts, both teams, game – 291, Phil. Warriors (153) vs. L.A. Lakers (138), 1961-12-08 (3 OT)
- Most field goal attempts, both teams, one half – 153, Boston (80) vs. Minneapolis (73), 1959-02-27 (2nd half)
- Lowest three-point field goal percentage, season – .104, 1982–83 (10/96)
- Fewest three-point field goals per game, season – 0.12, 1982–83 (10/82)
  - shared with Atlanta, 1980–81 (10/82)
- Most free throws made, both teams, one quarter – 41, Milwaukee (22) vs. L.A. Lakers (19), 2001-03-21
- Fewest free throw attempts, both teams, game – 12, L.A. Lakers (3) vs. San Diego Clippers (9), 1980-03-28
- Most rebounds, both teams, game – 188, Phil. Warriors (98) vs. L.A. Lakers (90), 1961-12-08 (3 OT)
- Fewest opponent defensive rebounds, game – 10, vs. Utah, 1990-04-01
- Fewest defensive rebounds, both teams, game – 31, Utah (10) at L.A. Lakers (21), 1990-04-01
- Most defensive rebounds, one half – 36, vs. Seattle, 1973-10-19
- Most assists per game, season – 31.4, 1984–85 (2,575/82)
- Fewest opponent assists, game – 3, vs. Boston (at Louisville, Kentucky), 1956-11-28
  - shared with three other teams
- Fewest assists, both teams, game – 10, Boston vs. Minneapolis (at Louisville, Kentucky), 1956-11-28
- Fewest disqualifications per game, season – 0.02, 1988–89 (2/82)
- Most steals, both teams, game – 40, Golden State (24) vs. L.A. Lakers (16), 1975-01-21
  - shared with two other pairs of teams
- Fewest steals, both teams, game – 2, L.A. Lakers (1) vs. Miami (1), 2006-01-16
  - shared with three other pairs of teams
- Most steals, one quarter – 11, vs. Chicago, 1982-03-12; at Dallas, 1994-12-13
  - shared with six other teams
- Fewest blocked shots, both teams, game – 0, L.A. Lakers vs. Houston, 1978-01-22
  - shared with 11 other pairs of teams

== NBA playoff records set by the Los Angeles Lakers ==
- Most NBA Finals appearances – 32 times
- Best postseason record – 15–1 (2001)
- Most Playoff Games Won – 421

== Franchise records for regular season ==
Unless otherwise stated, statistics/records are accurate as at the end of the 2025–26 season.

Most consecutive games played

1. A.C. Green – 567

Most minutes played in a game

1. Norm Nixon – 64

Highest minutes per game

1. Wilt Chamberlain – 43.7

Highest minutes per game in a season

1. Wilt Chamberlain – 45.3

Most points scored in a game

1. Kobe Bryant – 81
2. Elgin Baylor – 71
3. Wilt Chamberlain – 66
4. Kobe Bryant – 65
5. Elgin Baylor – 64

Highest career points per game

1. Elgin Baylor – 27.4

Highest points per game in a season

1. Elgin Baylor – 38.3 (48 games)
2. Kobe Bryant – 35.4
3. Elgin Baylor – 34.8
4. Elgin Baylor – 34.0
5. Luka Dončić – 33.5

Most defensive rebounds (since 1973–74)

1. Kareem Abdul-Jabbar – 7,785
2. Kobe Bryant – 5,548
3. Magic Johnson – 4,958
4. Shaquille O'Neal – 4,133
5. Lamar Odom – 3,757

Most offensive rebounds (since 1973–74)

1. Kareem Abdul-Jabbar – 2,494
2. A.C. Green – 2,089
3. Shaquille O'Neal – 1,957
4. Magic Johnson – 1,601
5. James Worthy – 1,561

Most total rebounds

1. Elgin Baylor – 11,463
2. Kareem Abdul-Jabbar – 10,279
3. Kobe Bryant – 7,047
4. Magic Johnson – 6,559
5. Wilt Chamberlain – 6,524

Most rebounds in a game

1. Wilt Chamberlain – 42

Highest rebounds per game

1. Wilt Chamberlain – 19.2

Highest rebounds per game in a season

1. Wilt Chamberlain – 21.1

Most assists in a game

1. Magic Johnson – 24

Highest career assists per game

1. Magic Johnson – 11.2

Highest assists per game in a season

1. Magic Johnson – 13.1

Most blocks in a game

1. Elmore Smith – 17

Highest career blocks per game

1. Elmore Smith – 3.93

Highest blocks per game in a season

1. Elmore Smith – 4.85

Most steals in a game

1. Jerry West – 10

Highest career steals per game

1. Eddie Jones – 2.05

Highest steals per game in a season

1. Magic Johnson – 3.43

Most field goals made in a game

1. Wilt Chamberlain – 29 -Feb. 9, 1969

Highest field goal percentage in a game

1. Wilt Chamberlain – 1.000 on 14 attempts

Most three-point field goals in a game

1. Kobe Bryant – 12 (January 7, 2003 vs Seattle SuperSonics)
2. Kobe Bryant – 9 (March 28, 2003 vs Washington Wizards)
3. Kobe Bryant – 9 (March 22, 2005 vs Utah Jazz)
4. Kobe Bryant – 9 (March 28, 2008 vs Memphis Grizzlies)
5. LeBron James – 9 (January 24, 2023 vs Los Angeles Clippers)
6. D'Angelo Russell – 9 (March 8, 2024 vs Milwaukee Bucks)
7. LeBron James – 9 (March 31, 2024 vs Brooklyn Nets)
8. Dalton Knecht – 9 (November 19, 2024 vs Utah Jazz)
9. Austin Reaves – 9 (April 3, 2025 vs Golden State Warriors)
10. Luka Dončić – 9 (March 12, 2026 vs Chicago Bulls)
11. Luka Dončić – 9 (March 19, 2026 vs Miami Heat)

Most free throws made in a game

1. Anthony Davis – 26 (October 29, 2019 vs Memphis Grizzlies)
2. Dwight Howard – 25 (March 12, 2013 vs Orlando Magic)
3. Kobe Bryant – 23 (January 31, 2006 vs New York Knicks)
4. Kobe Bryant – 23 (January 30, 2001 vs Cleveland Cavaliers)

Lowest turnovers per game

1. Mark Madsen – 0.4 (minimum 100 games played)

Lowest turnovers per game in a season

1. Alfonzo McKinnie – 0.1 (2020–21 season)

Highest assist-to-turnover ratio

1. Sedale Threatt – 3.34

Highest assist-to-turnover ratio in a season

1. Nick Van Exel – 4.25 (1997–98 season)

Most double doubles, career

1. Magic Johnson – 463
2. Shaquille O'Neal – 365
3. Pau Gasol – 215

Most triple doubles, career

1. Magic Johnson – 138
2. LeBron James – 52
3. Elgin Baylor – 26

=== Career leaders ===
Category	Name	Years with Lakers	Total
SP	Kobe Bryant	1996–2016	20
GP	Kobe Bryant	1996–2016	1,346
MP	Kobe Bryant	1996–2016	48,637
MPG	Wilt Chamberlain	1968–1973	43.7
PTS	Kobe Bryant	1996–2016	33,643
PPG	Elgin Baylor	1958–1971	27.4
REB	Elgin Baylor	1958–1971	11,463
RPG	Wilt Chamberlain	1968–1973	19.2
OREB	Kareem Abdul-Jabbar	1975–1989	2,494
DREB	Kareem Abdul-Jabbar	1975–1989	7,785
AST	Magic Johnson	1979–1991, 1996	10,141
APG	Magic Johnson	1979–1991, 1996	11.2
TO	Kobe Bryant	1996–2016	4,010
PF	Kobe Bryant	1996–2016	3,353
STL	Kobe Bryant	1996–2016	1,944
SPG	Eddie Jones	1994–1999	2.1
BLK	Kareem Abdul-Jabbar	1975–1989	2,694
BPG	Elmore Smith	1973–1975	3.9
FG	Kobe Bryant	1996–2016	11,719
FGA	Kobe Bryant	1996–2016	26,200
FG%	JaVale McGee	1968–1973	.628
2PFG	Kareem Abdul-Jabbar	1975–1989	9934
2PFGA	Kobe Bryant	1996–2016	20,654
2P%	JaVale McGee	1968–1973	.636
3PFG	Kobe Bryant	1996–2016	1,827
3PFGA	Kobe Bryant	1996–2016	5,546
3P%	Steve Nash	2012–2015	.422
FGM	Kobe Bryant	1996–2016	14,481
FT	Kobe Bryant	1996–2016	8,378
FTA	Kobe Bryant	1996–2016	10,011
FT%	Cazzie Russell	1974–1977	.877

=== Single-season leaders ===
Category	Name	NBA season	Total
MP	Wilt Chamberlain	1968–69	3,669
MPG	Wilt Chamberlain	1968–69	45.3
PTS	Kobe Bryant	2005–06	2,832
PPG	Kobe Bryant	2005–06	35.4
REB	Wilt Chamberlain	1968–69	1,712
RPG	Wilt Chamberlain	1968–69	21.1
OREB	Shaquille O'Neal	1999–2000	336
DREB	Kareem Abdul-Jabbar	1975–76	1,111
AST	Magic Johnson	1990–91	989
APG	Magic Johnson	1983–84	13.1
TO	Magic Johnson	1990–91	314
PF	Jim Chones	1980–81	324
STL	Magic Johnson	1981–82	208
SPG	Magic Johnson	1980–81	3.4
BLK	Elmore Smith	1973–74	393
BPG	Elmore Smith	1973–74	4.9
FG	Elgin Baylor	1962–63	1,029
FGA	Elgin Baylor	1962–63	2,273
FG%	Wilt Chamberlain	1972–73	.727
2PFG	Elgin Baylor	1962–63	1,029
2PFGA	Elgin Baylor	1962–63	2,273
2P%	Wilt Chamberlain	1972–73	.727
3PFG	Luka Dončić	2025–26	254
3PFGA	Luka Dončić	2025–26	694
3P%	Rui Hachimura	2025–26	.443
FGM	Elgin Baylor	1962–63	1,244
FT	Jerry West	1965–66	840
FTA	Jerry West	1965–66	977
FT%	Magic Johnson	1988–89	.911

== Franchise records for playoffs ==
Bold denotes still active with team.

Italic denotes still active but not with team.

Points scored (regular season) (as of the 2024–25 NBA season)

Most games played, playoffs

1. Kobe Bryant – 220
2. Derek Fisher – 193
3. Magic Johnson – 190
4. Kareem Abdul-Jabbar – 180
5. Michael Cooper – 168
6. Jerry West – 153
7. Byron Scott – 150
8. James Worthy – 143
9. Elgin Baylor – 134
10. A.C. Green – 126

Most minutes played, playoffs

1. Kobe Bryant – 8,641
2. Magic Johnson – 7,538
3. Jerry West – 6,321
4. Kareem Abdul-Jabbar – 6,295
5. Elgin Baylor – 5,510
6. Derek Fisher – 5,405
7. James Worthy – 5,297
8. Shaquille O'Neal – 4,992
9. Byron Scott – 4,828
10. Michael Cooper – 4,744

Most points, playoffs

1. Kobe Bryant – 5,640
2. Jerry West – 4,457
3. Kareem Abdul-Jabbar – 4,070
4. Magic Johnson – 3,701
5. Elgin Baylor – 3,623
6. Shaquille O'Neal – 3,383
7. James Worthy – 3,022
8. Byron Scott – 2,223
9. Derek Fisher – 1,700
10. George Mikan – 1,680

Most field goals made, playoffs

1. Kobe Bryant – 2,014
2. Kareem Abdul-Jabbar – 1,643
3. Jerry West – 1,622
4. Elgin Baylor – 1,388
5. Shaquille O'Neal – 1,309
6. Magic Johnson – 1,291
7. James Worthy – 1,267
8. Byron Scott – 864
9. Pau Gasol – 600
10. Derek Fisher – 582
11. Michael Cooper – 582

Most field goals attempted, playoffs

1. Kobe Bryant – 4,499
2. Jerry West – 3,460
3. Elgin Baylor – 3,151
4. Kareem Abdul-Jabbar – 3,024
5. Magic Johnson – 2,552
6. Shaquille O'Neal – 2,352
7. James Worthy – 2,329
8. Byron Scott – 1,747
9. George Mikan – 1,394
10. Derek Fisher – 1,358

Most three-point field goals made, playoffs

1. Kobe Bryant – 292
2. Derek Fisher – 219
3. Michael Cooper – 124
4. Byron Scott – 116
5. **LeBron James** – 110
6. Robert Horry – 83
7. Rick Fox – 82
8. Sasha Vujacic – 63
9. **Austin Reaves** – 61
10. Nick Van Exel – 60

Most three-point field goals attempted, playoffs

1. Kobe Bryant – 882
2. Derek Fisher – 543
3. **LeBron James** – 327
4. Michael Cooper – 316
5. Byron Scott – 286
6. Robert Horry – 263
7. Rick Fox – 230
8. Magic Johnson – 212
9. Nick Van Exel – 196
10. Metta World Peace – 195

Most free throws made, playoffs

1. Kobe Bryant – 1,320
2. Jerry West – 1,213
3. Magic Johnson – 1,068
4. Elgin Baylor – 847
5. Kareem Abdul-Jabbar – 784
6. Shaquille O'Neal – 765
7. George Mikan – 554
8. James Worthy – 474
9. Byron Scott – 379
10. Pau Gasol – 358

Most free throws attempted, playoffs

1. Kobe Bryant – 1,617
2. Jerry West – 1,506
3. Shaquille O'Neal – 1,472
4. Magic Johnson – 1,274
5. Elgin Baylor – 1,098
6. Kareem Abdul-Jabbar – 1,037
7. George Mikan – 705
8. Wilt Chamberlain – 667
9. James Worthy – 652
10. Pau Gasol – 487

Most rebounds, playoffs

1. Wilt Chamberlain – 1,783
2. Elgin Baylor – 1,724
3. Shaquille O'Neal – 1,630
4. Kareem Abdul-Jabbar – 1,525
5. Magic Johnson – 1,465
6. Kobe Bryant – 1,119
7. Pau Gasol – 937
8. A.C. Green – 858
9. Jerry West – 855
10. Lamar Odom – 824

Most offensive rebounds (since 1973–74), playoffs

1. Shaquille O'Neal – 561
2. Kareem Abdul-Jabbar – 438
3. Magic Johnson – 349
4. A.C. Green – 316
5. Pau Gasol – 292
6. James Worthy – 257
7. Kobe Bryant – 230
8. Lamar Odom – 219
9. Kurt Rambis – 189
10. Robert Horry – 183

Most defensive rebounds (since 1973–74), playoffs

1. Magic Johnson – 1,116
2. Kareem Abdul-Jabbar – 1,087
3. Shaquille O'Neal – 1,069
4. Kobe Bryant – 889
5. Pau Gasol – 645
6. Lamar Odom – 605
7. A.C. Green – 542
8. James Worthy – 490
9. Kurt Rambis – 438
10. **LeBron James** – 430

Most assists, playoffs

1. Magic Johnson – 2,346
2. Kobe Bryant – 1,040
3. Jerry West – 970
4. Michael Cooper – 703
5. Elgin Baylor – 541
6. Kareem Abdul-Jabbar – 540
7. Derek Fisher – 507
8. Norm Nixon – 465
9. James Worthy – 463
10. **LeBron James** – 408

Most steals, playoffs

1. Magic Johnson – 358
2. Kobe Bryant – 310
3. Derek Fisher – 219
4. Byron Scott – 204
5. Michael Cooper – 203
6. James Worthy – 177
7. Kareem Abdul-Jabbar – 169
8. Robert Horry – 120
9. Norm Nixon – 89
10. Jamaal Wilkes – 83

Most blocks, playoffs

1. Kareem Abdul-Jabbar – 437
2. Shaquille O'Neal – 310
3. Pau Gasol – 178
4. Kobe Bryant – 144
5. Andrew Bynum – 110
6. Lamar Odom – 97
7. Michael Cooper – 96
8. Anthony Davis – 96
9. James Worthy – 96
10. Elden Campbell – 90
11. Robert Horry – 90

Most personal fouls, playoffs

1. Kobe Bryant – 660
2. Kareem Abdul-Jabbar – 625
3. Magic Johnson – 524
4. Derek Fisher – 497
5. Michael Cooper – 474
6. Jerry West – 451
7. Elgin Baylor – 435
8. Shaquille O'Neal – 415
9. Vern Mikkelsen – 397
10. Byron Scott – 393

Most triple doubles, playoffs

1. Magic Johnson – 30
2. **LeBron James** – 5
3. Elgin Baylor – 4
4. Pau Gasol – 1
5. Andrew Bynum – 1
6. James Worthy – 1
7. Wilt Chamberlain – 1
8. Jerry West – 1

== Other franchise records ==
=== In a game ===
==== Team (regular season) ====
- Largest margin of victory in a home game – 63 (Score: 162 – 99) March 19, 1972 vs. Golden State
- Largest margin of victory in a road game – 47 (Score: 138 – 91) November 12, 1966 @ Detroit
- Largest margin of defeat in a home game – 48 (Score: 142 – 94) March 6, 2014 vs. LA Clippers
- Largest margin of defeat in a road game – 49 (Score: 122 – 73) January 22, 2017 @ Dallas Mavericks
- Fewest points given up in a home game (post shot clock) – 57 (score: 112–57) January 11, 2011 vs. Cleveland
- Most points scored in a game – 162
- Most points scored in a first half – 89
- Most points scored in a second half – 91
- Most points scored in a quarter – 51
- Most points scored by starters in a game - 120 vs the Portland Trail Blazers on April 7, 1985
- Most points allowed – 173 (Score: 173–139) February 27, 1959 @ Boston Celtics
- Most assists – 51
- Most rebounds – 107
- Most blocks – 21
- Most steals – 23
- Most field goals made – 69
- Most field goals attempted – 153
- Most three-point field goals made – 22
- Most three-point field goals attempted – 52
- Most free throws made – 52
- Most free throws attempted – 69
- Most turnovers – 43
- Largest comeback – 30 points vs the Dallas Mavericks on December 6, 2002

==== Team (playoffs) ====
- Most points scored – 153
- Most points allowed – 148
- Most assists – 44
- Most rebounds – 81
- Most blocks – 15
- Most steals – 19
- Most field goals made – 67
- Most field goals attempted – 116
- Most three-point field goals made – 19
- Most three-point field goals attempted – 31
- Most free throws made – 49
- Most free throws attempted – 68
- Most turnovers – 28
- Largest comeback – 29 points vs the Seattle SuperSonics on May 4, 1989

== See also ==
- NBA records
