= Dick Garmaker =

American basketball player (1932–2020)

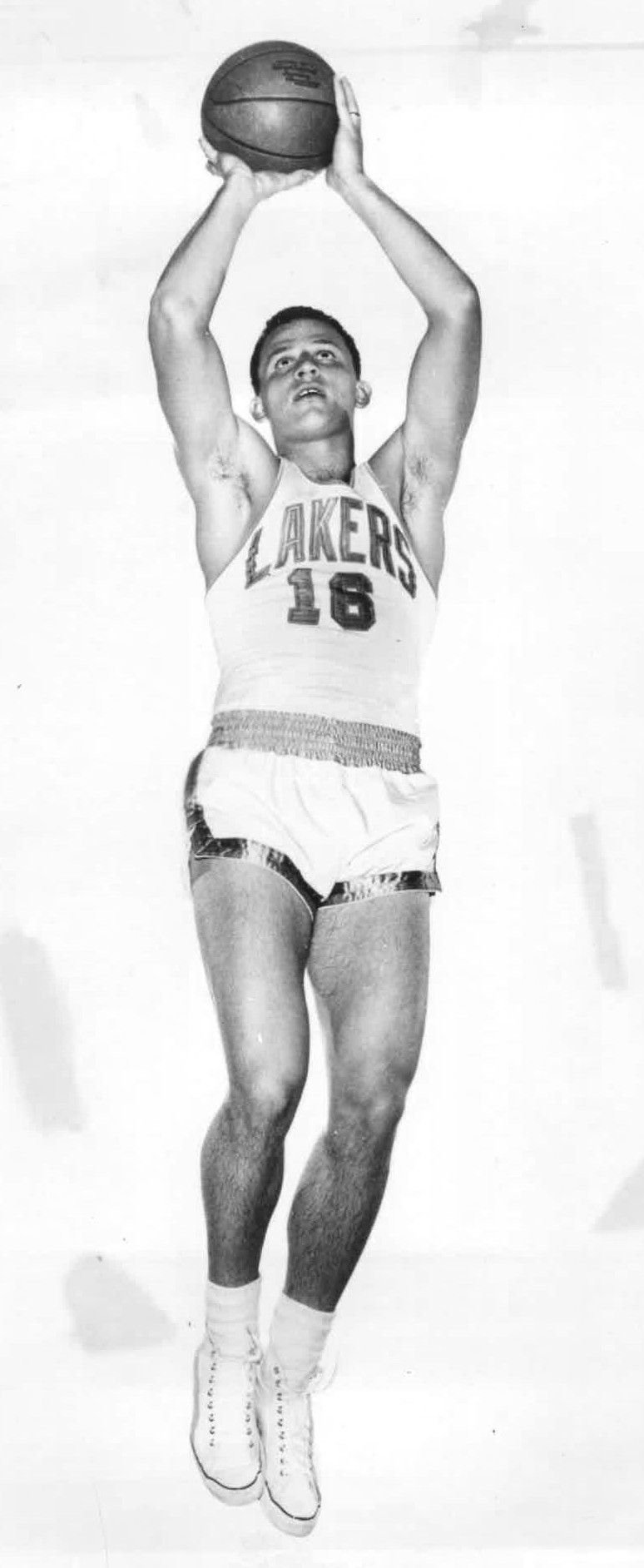

Personal information
- Born: October 29, 1932 Hibbing, Minnesota, U.S.
- Died: June 13, 2020 (aged 87)
- Listed height: 6 ft 3 in (1.91 m)
- Listed weight: 200 lb (91 kg)

Career information
- High school: Hibbing (Hibbing, Minnesota)
- College: Hibbing CC (1950–1952); Minnesota (1953–1955)
- NBA draft: 1955: territorial pick
- Drafted by: Minneapolis Lakers
- Playing career: 1955–1961
- Position: Shooting guard / small forward
- Number: 16, 18, 17

Career history
- 1955–1960: Minneapolis Lakers
- 1960–1961: New York Knicks

Career highlights
- 4× NBA All-Star (1957–1960); All-NBA Second Team (1957); Consensus first-team All-American (1955); 2× First-team All-Big Ten (1954, 1955); No. 53 retired by Minnesota Golden Gophers

Career NBA statistics
- Points: 5,597 (13.3 ppg)
- Rebounds: 1,748 (4.2 rpg)
- Assists: 1,114 (2.6 apg)
- Stats at NBA.com
- Stats at Basketball Reference

Richard Eugene Garmaker (October 29, 1932 – June 13, 2020) was an American basketball player who played professionally in the National Basketball Association (NBA) from 1955 to 1961, and was a four time NBA All-Star, and was once second-team All-NBA. Garmaker was a junior college All-American. He later became a consensus first-team All-American at the University of Minnesota in 1955. He was also a two time first-team All-Big Ten selection, and became a member of the school's Hall of Fame, which has also retired his No. 53 jersey number.

== Early life ==
Garmaker was born on October 29, 1932, in Hibbing, Minnesota. He attended Hibbing High School, and played center on its basketball team. He led the team to the state championship tournament in 1949. He graduated from Hibbing High School in 1950. (Hibbing natives Nobel Prize in Literature-winning musician Bob Dylan graduated from Hibbing High School in 1959, and Naismith Hall of Fame NBA forward Kevin McHale graduated from Hibbing in 1976.)

== College career ==
Garmaker attended Hibbing Community College (now Minnesota North College – Hibbing) for two years, graduating in 1952. He played on its basketball team, and was a star player in the Northern Junior Conference, breaking all of his school's scoring records. In 1952, he led Hibbing to the finals of the Minnesota-North Dakota regional junior college basketball tournament. He was named an All-American and led the team to the National Junior College tournament, losing in the championship game.

He subsequently attended the University of Minnesota, where he obtained a history degree. Garmaker was a 6 ft 3 in (1.90 m) guard/forward on the Minnesota Golden Gopher's basketball team, for which he played as a junior and senior, under coach Ozzie Cowles. As a junior (1953-54), he averaged 21.6 points and seven rebounds per game; and 24.2 points and 8.4 rebounds per game as a senior (1954-55). As a junior, he was the school's first player to score more than 400 points in a season, and as a senior he was the first to score more than 500 in a season. He was the fourth leading scorer in the Big Ten in 1954 and sixth best in rebounding; and second in scoring and seventh in rebounding in 1955. In 1955, he was tenth in the nation among all men's players in scoring.

Garmaker was selected first-team All-Big Ten as both a junior and senior, along with teammate and future NBA player, and lifelong friend, Charles Mencel, both seasons. He was a 1954-55 consensus first-team All-American for the Golden Gophers, along with Sihugo Green (Duquesne), Tom Gola (La Salle), Bill Russell (San Francisco) and Dick Ricketts (Duquesne). The 1954-55 Golden Gophers were ranked 11th by the Associated Press (AP) at the end of the season.

Even though his Golden Gopher career had ended in 1951, Whitey Skoog mentored Garmaker when he joined the University of Minnesota team. Garmaker learned the turnaround fade-away jump shot from Skoog, which became Garmaker's hallmark shot. He and Skoog would become teammates for two seasons on the Minneapolis Lakers in the NBA (1955-57).

His 22.9 points per game career scoring average is the highest in Golden Gophers history (through 2024-25). In 1997, Garmaker was named to the Gophers M Club Hall of Fame. In 2011, Minnesota retired his jersey No. 53.

== Professional career ==
He was drafted by the NBA's Minneapolis Lakers twice (in 1954 and again in 1955) and joined the team for the 1955–56 NBA season. As a result of that fact, Garmaker became the first player in NBA history to be selected in multiple NBA drafts before the practice eventually became abolished in the 1980s.

As a rookie in 1955-56, Garmaker, playing shooting guard, averaged 5.7 points, 1.9 rebounds and 1.5 assists in only 13 minutes per game. His teammates included Hall of Famers Clyde Lovellette, Slater Martin and Vern Mikkelsen, as well as his Golden Gophers teammate, point guard Chuck Mencel. He was the backup shooting guard to his mentor Whitey Skoog. In his four-and-a-half seasons with the Lakers, Garmaker appeared as an NBA All-Star four times, but the team never finished above .500.

He arguably had his finest season in 1956–57, in which he ranked tenth in the league in points per game (16.3), earned a spot on the All-NBA second team, and was a starter on the Western Division All-Star team. He also averaged 4.7 rebounds and 2.6 assists, in 33.4 minutes per game (second to Lovellette on the team). Ironically, the increased playing time opened up for Garmaker when Skoog suffered a back injury that effectively ended his NBA career. Garmaker was an All-Star game starter again the following season (1957-58), while averaging 16.1 points, 5.4 rebounds and 2.7 assists per game.

Garmaker made the All-Star team as a reserve in 1959 and 1960. In 1958-59, his last full season with the Lakers, he averaged 13.7 points, 4.5 rebounds and 2.9 assists per game during the regular season. Although under .500, the Lakers led by rookie Elgin Baylor made the playoffs, reaching the NBA finals against Bill Russell and the Boston Celtics, where they lost in four games. Garmaker averaged 19.3 points and 4.3 rebounds per game against the Celtics.

In January 1960, he was traded to the New York Knicks for backup center Ray Felix, cash and an exchange of draft picks. The Lakers were having a poor season, and had lost five straight games at the time of the trade. Garmaker had already been named an All-Star that season, and was averaging 27 minutes and 11.7 points per game, his fewest since his rookie season with the Lakers.

He finished out the year with the Knicks, averaging nearly 13 points and five rebounds in 29 minutes per game. In September 1960, before the 1960-61 season started, Garmaker announced his retirement so he could devote full time to his Minnesota based insurance business. The retirement was brief, and Garmaker rejoined the team in early November. During the 1960-61 season, the Knicks used Garmaker as a point guard alongside future Hall of Fame guard Richie Guerin. He averaged 15.6 points (his highest since 1958), 3.1 assists and 3.9 rebounds in 31.5 minutes per game.

He retired from the Knicks for good after the 1960-61 season. He was only 28, but wanted to focus on his insurance business in Minnesota.

In his six-year career, Garmaker scored 5,597 points, averaging 13.3 points, 4.3 rebounds and 2.6 assists in nearly 29 minutes per game.

== Death ==
Garmaker died at age 87 on June 13, 2020. He was survived by his wife Darlene, son Stu and one grandchild, but his oldest son Steven had died in 2015.

== NBA career statistics ==
Legend
GP	Games played	GS	Games started	MPG	Minutes per game
FG%	Field goal percentage	3P%	3-point field goal percentage	FT%	Free throw percentage
RPG	Rebounds per game	APG	Assists per game	SPG	Steals per game
BPG	Blocks per game	PPG	Points per game	**Bold**	Career high

=== Regular season ===
Year	Team	GP	MPG	FG%	FT%	RPG	APG	PPG
1955–56	Minneapolis	68	12.8	.370	.806	1.9	1.5	5.7
1956–57	Minneapolis	**72**	33.4	.400	.839	4.7	2.6	**16.3**
1957–58	Minneapolis	68	32.6	.395	.764	**5.4**	2.7	16.1
1958–59	Minneapolis	**72**	**34.6**	.395	.772	4.5	2.9	13.7
1959–60	Minneapolis	44	27.0	.377	.718	4.3	**3.0**	11.7
1959–60	New York	26	28.7	.431	**.860**	4.8	2.8	12.9
1960–61	New York	71	31.5	**.440**	.768	3.9	3.1	15.6
Career		421	28.9	.403	.787	4.2	2.6	13.3
All-Star		4	18.3	.361	.833	4.8	1.5	7.8

=== Playoffs ===
Year	Team	GP	MPG	FG%	FT%	RPG	APG	PPG
1956	Minneapolis	3	14.0	.368	**.941**	2.7	**3.7**	10.0
1957	Minneapolis	5	**37.4**	.275	.844	**7.0**	3.4	13.0
1959	Minneapolis	**13**	33.8	**.424**	.778	4.2	3.0	**14.5**
Career		21	31.8	.379	.821	4.7	3.2	13.5
