= Walter Dukes =

American basketball player (1930–2001)

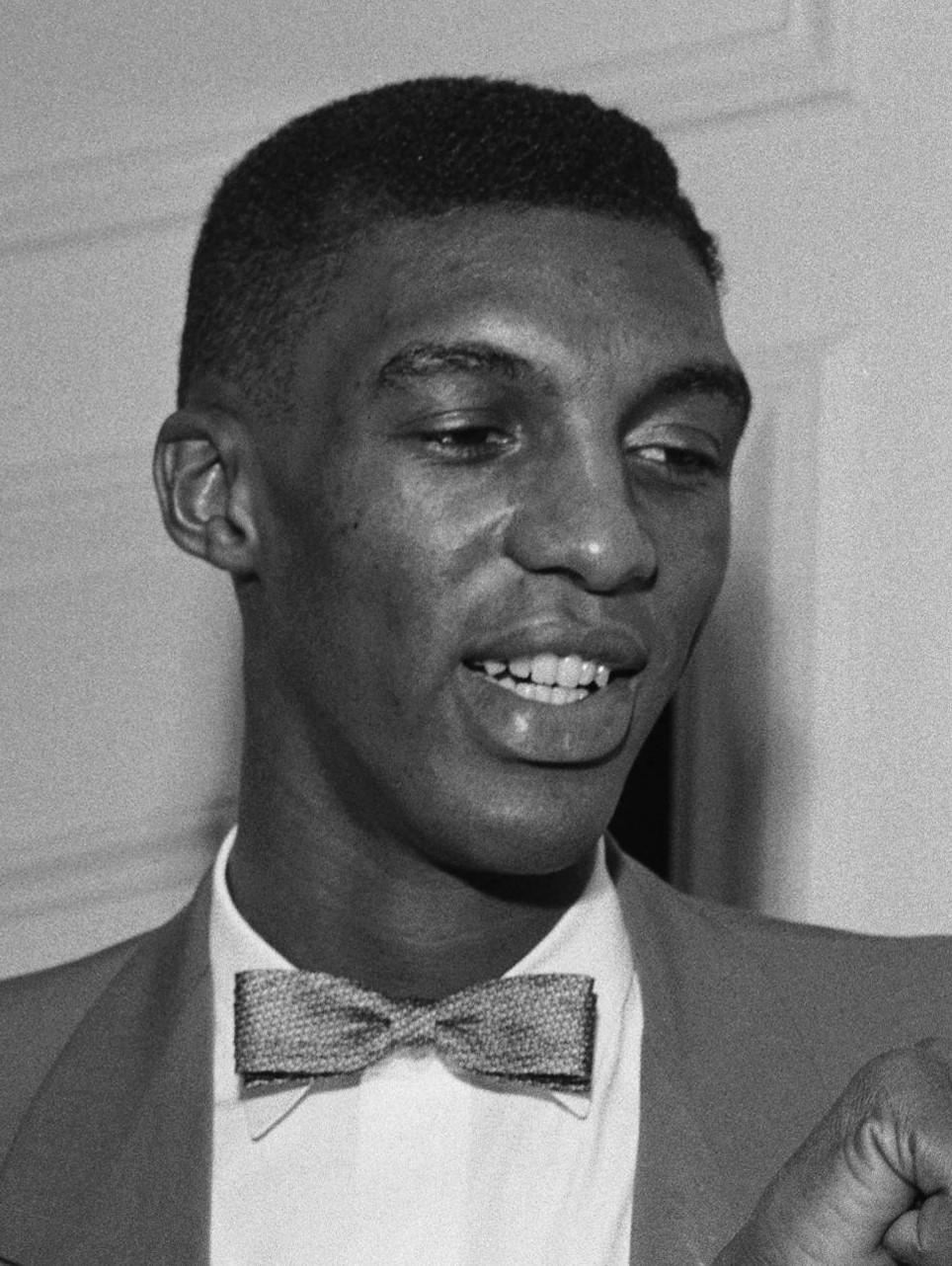
- Dukes in 1954

Personal information
- Born: June 23, 1930 Youngstown, Ohio, U.S.
- Died: March 13, 2001 (aged 70) Detroit, Michigan, U.S.
- Listed height: 7 ft 0 in (2.13 m)
- Listed weight: 220 lb (100 kg)

Career information
- High school: East (Rochester, New York)
- College: Seton Hall (1950–1953)
- NBA draft: 1953: territorial pick
- Drafted by: New York Knicks
- Playing career: 1953–1969
- Position: Center
- Number: 6, 24, 14, 23

Career history
- 1953–1955: Harlem Globetrotters
- 1955–1956: New York Knicks
- 1956–1957: Minneapolis Lakers
- 1957–1963: Detroit Pistons
- 1963–1964: Camden Bullets
- 1964–1967: Trenton Colonials
- 1967–1968: Asbury Park Boardwalkers
- 1968–1969: Scranton Miners

Career highlights
- 2× NBA All-Star (1960, 1961); EPBL champion (1964); Consensus first-team All-American (1953); Haggerty Award winner (1953); No. 5 retired by Seton Hall Pirates

Career NBA statistics
- Points: 5,765 (10.4 ppg)
- Rebounds: 6,223 (11.3 rpg)
- Assists: 608 (1.1 apg)
- Stats at NBA.com
- Stats at Basketball Reference

Walter F. Dukes (June 23, 1930 – March 13, 2001) was a center for the New York Knicks (1955–1956), Minneapolis Lakers (1956–1957) and Detroit Pistons (1957–1963). He played college basketball for the Seton Hall Pirates. He has held the NCAA Division I men's record for most rebounds in a season for over 70 years.

== Early life and education ==
Dukes was born on June 23, 1930, in Youngstown, Ohio, but later lived in Rochester, New York. He attended public schools in Youngstown and Rochester, including East High School in Rochester where he played high school basketball. In 1948, Dukes moved to South Orange, New Jersey to attend Seton Hall Preparatory School (a college-preparatory school), and graduated with the class of 1949. He then attended Seton Hall University, where he obtained a Bachelor of Science degree. He obtained a Masters of Business Administration degree from New York University, and then an LLB degree from New York Law School in 1960. He also attended The Sorbonne in France. As a college senior, Dukes stated it was more important for him to pursue a law degree than professional basketball, though he would do both if possible (akin to George Mikan).

== Basketball career ==
=== Seton Hall ===
Dukes was recruited to Seton Hall out of East High School by future Naismith Memorial Basketball Hall of Fame coach John "Honey" Russell. He had earlier learned about Seton Hall from his East High freshman basketball coach, who was a Seton Hall alumnus; and from former Rochester Royals player Bob Davies, considered the greatest Seton Hall player before Dukes.

The 6 ft 11 in (2.11 m) Dukes played center for three seasons on Seton Hall's basketball team (1950-53). As a sophomore (1950-51), he averaged 12.5 points and 16.1 rebounds per game. In his junior season, Dukes led all college players by averaging 19.7 rebounds per game. He also averaged 20.2 points per game. As a senior, Dukes averaged 22.2 rebounds and 26.1 points per game. He also set an NCAA record for most rebounds in a season with 734 (which still stands through the 2024–25 season).

Dukes was a 1952-53 consensus first-team All-American. He received the most votes of any player among the Associated Press's (AP) first team All-American selections. He also received the Haggerty Award as the New York metropolitan area's most outstanding player that year. Sport Magazine named him the top college player for the 1952–53 season. The United Press also named Dukes its Player of the Year.

In his senior year, Dukes led Seton Hall to a 31–2 record, and the National Invitation Tournament (NIT) championship; at a time when the NIT tournament was a prestigious event and had more fans at its final game than attended that year's NCAA tournament final game. Dukes was named the NIT's most valuable player. Seton Hall was ranked first in the nation for six weeks that season.

Seton Hall retired Dukes's jersey No. 5. He was inducted into the school's Hall of fame in 1973. The 1952–53 team has also been inducted into Seton Hall's Hall of Fame. Through the 2024–25 season, he holds the school's season records for free throws attempted and made, total rebounds, rebounding average and total points. He holds the Seton Hall career records for total rebounds and rebounds per game (19.5).

==== Louisville incident ====
During Dukes' senior season, in early March, the team traveled to play Dayton, and Dukes (an African-American) was refused a room at the hotel the team was to stay in; so they elected to sleep on the team bus. After 27 straight wins, Seton Hall lost their first game of the year in an upset loss to Dayton the next day, March 1, 1953. Seton Hall next played Louisville at the Louisville Armory on March 2. Seton Hall had defeated Louisville earlier in the year at Seton Hall, in a game marred by Louisville's players trying to provoke Dukes with hateful language.

Louisville was a segregated city at the time, and Dukes as an African-American was barred from local hotels under Jim Crow laws. This time, the team opted to sleep on a train, rather than accept this treatment of Dukes. A crowd of Louisville fans surrounded the train station, and kept the Seton Hall players up all night by pounding on the windows of the train station and singing racist songs. The next day, the police escorted the team bus to the game, but had it park far from the entrance, giving some of the Louisville fans an opportunity to spew more invective at the players as they walked to the arena.

The game itself was extremely physical and there was a question of the referees' bias in favor of Louisville. At one point a Louisville player hit Dukes in the jaw, and when he fell to the court the referee called Dukes for travelling, instead of a foul on the Louisville player. Louisville won 73–67, though Dukes scored 35 points and was dominant as a rebounder. This was the second of Seton's Halls two losses over the entire season.

The AP ranked Seton Hall No. 1 in the country from January 19 through February 23, with the Indiana University Hoosiers ranked second during the same time period. After the two losses, Seton Hall's ranking fell to No. 3. Seton Hall's final 1952-53 ranking was No. 2. Indiana finished the season ranked No. 1, after winning the NCAA tournament.

After Louisville won the March 2 game, a fight broke out among players during the post-game handshake and some of Louisville's fans ran onto the court and joined in the fight against Seton Hall; knocking one Seton Hall player unconscious, leaving another in need of thirteen stitches to close a cut across his eye or lip, and ripping a Catholic medallion from Dukes's neck. One of Louisville's players suffered a blow to the head for which he blamed Dukes. When one of the injured Seton Hall players later learned Louisville would be coming to play in the NIT tournament in New York, he was planning a revenge attack while Louisville's players were on board the train to New York; but Seton Hall leaders learned of this and stepped in and thwarted any such ideas.

=== Harlem Globetrotters ===
Dukes was selected by the New York Knicks in the 1953 NBA draft, but instead chose to play for the Harlem Globetrotters. He signed a one-year contract with the Globetrotters for $25,000, and was personally presented with 3,000 silver dollars by owner Abe Saperstein as a signing bonus. He played two years for the Globetrotters before joining the Knicks. It was also reported the Globetrotters had offered him $55,000, but he would have been willing to play for the Knicks if they would have paid him $20,000; but the Knicks would not go above $17,000.

=== National Basketball Association (NBA) ===
==== New York Knicks and Minneapolis Lakers ====
As an NBA player, Dukes was listed as 7 ft tall (2.13 m) and 220 pounds (99 kg). He has been called the NBA's second seven foot tall player after Ralph Siewert. He played his rookie season with the New York Knicks (1955-56). Dukes had an injured knee early in the season and missed playing time. He received negative press questioning his desire to play, but Knicks coach Joe Lapchick considered him a valuable player, and the fastest big man in the NBA. With only 21 games left in the season Vince Boryla replaced Lapchick as head coach when Lapchick resigned. Less than two weeks after taking over, Boryla fined and then suspended Dukes for coming late to practice; though the team quickly re-instated him. Dukes played 60 games with the Knicks as a rookie, averaging 7.8 points and 7.4 rebounds in only 21.5 minutes of play per game.

In October 1956, after being suspended again, this time for not attending an early practice, the Knicks traded Dukes and the rights to Burdy Haldorson to the Minneapolis Lakers for future Hall of fame guard Slater Martin, Jerry Bird and a player to be named later. In his one season with the Lakers, Dukes averaged 10.1 points and 11.2 rebounds (8th best in the NBA) in only 26.3 minutes per game. The Lakers finished the season 34–38, tied with the St. Louis Hawks for best record in the Western Division, but lost in a tiebreaker playoff game to the Hawks to officially finish second; later being swept by the Hawks 3–0 in the Western Division playoff finals. Dukes averaged 11.3 points and a series best 16.3 rebounds per game in the Hawks' series.

==== Detroit Pistons ====
Dukes was traded to the Detroit Pistons in September 1957, before the start of the 1957–58 season, in exchange for Larry Foust and cash. For the first time in his career, Dukes averaged over 30 minutes per game, with per games averages of 11.2 points and 13.3 rebounds (6th best in the NBA). He was ninth in NBA Most Valuable Player voting. After being traded during his first two consecutive postseasons, Dukes spent his final six NBA seasons with the Pistons.

During the 1958–59 season, Dukes averaged 13 points and 13.3 rebounds per game (6th best in the NBA). The following season, Dukes was named as a starter in the 1960 All-Star Game. He averaged 15.2 points and 13.4 rebounds per game (7th best in the NBA) and was 11th in the voting for Most Valuable Player. The Pistons lost in the playoff semifinals to the Lakers, but Dukes averaged 24 points a game in that two-game series.

Dukes made the West All-Star team again in 1960-61. He averaged 11.7 points and 14.1 rebounds (6th best in the NBA) in only 28 minutes played per game. His playing time fell below 25 minutes per game the following season, but he still averaged over 10 rebounds per game (10.4) and 9.4 points per game. This was his sixth consecutive year averaging over 10 rebounds per game, while never averaging over 32.5 minutes per game in a season and averaging less than 30 minutes per game three times during that stretch.

In his final NBA season (1962-63), Dukes averaged less than 15 minutes per game as backup center for Bob Ferry on the Pistons; though still averaging nearly six rebounds per game. The Pistons waived Dukes in October 1963. Later that season, he received offers to join NBA teams, including the St. Louis Hawks, but chose not to play.

=== Career ===
Dukes averaged double figures in rebounds in six of his eight seasons in the NBA, and had career averages of 11.3 rebounds per game and 10.4 points per game.

Dukes led the NBA in personal fouls in 1958 (311) and 1959 (332) and led the NBA in disqualifications four consecutive seasons between 1958–59 and 1961–62 — still an NBA record. His 121 career disqualifications (in only eight seasons, 553 games) rank second in the NBA to Vern Mikkelsen, and he holds the record for the highest career percentage of games fouled out (21.9%) for any player with over 400 games played.

=== Eastern Professional Basketball League ===
Dukes played in the Eastern Professional Basketball League (EPBL) for the Camden Bullets, Trenton Colonials, Asbury Park Boardwalkers and Scranton Miners from 1963 to 1969. He won an EPBL Championship with the Bullets in 1964. He was considered the Colonials' team leader, based in large part on the full effort he gave during games, on a team that included future NBA all-star Bob Love.

=== Coaching ===
He spent time as an assistant basketball coach to Charley Jackson of Hunter College.

== Personal and public life ==
In 1953, inspired by Seton Hall teammate Richie Regan, Dukes converted to Catholicism.

In 1961, Dukes was licensed to practice law in Michigan, and in 1962 was licensed to practice law in Pennsylvania. He was a member of the Philadelphia law firm, Stassen, Capehart and Sculin, headed by former Minnesota governor and frequent presidential candidate Harold E. Stassen.

In 1966, Dukes was appointed as an attorney with the U.S. Department of Labor's Office of the Solicitor, in its New York regional branch. Dukes also owned travel agencies in New York and Detroit, while also practicing law and playing in the EPBL. Later, Dukes failed to pay mandatory dues to maintain his legal license in Michigan, and in 1975, Dukes was found guilty in Manhattan Criminal Court for practicing law without a license. Dukes believed it was a misunderstanding and his involvement in the case at issue did not warrant the punishment.

He was in an automobile accident that left him paralyzed for over a year in the 1970s.

== Death ==
On March 14, 2001, Dukes was found dead in his apartment in Detroit, Michigan. According to a police spokesman, he had been dead for about a month when his body was found. He died of natural causes, aged 70.

== Career statistics ==
Legend
GP	Games played	GS	Games started	MPG	Minutes per game
FG%	Field goal percentage	3P%	3-point field goal percentage	FT%	Free throw percentage
RPG	Rebounds per game	APG	Assists per game	SPG	Steals per game
BPG	Blocks per game	PPG	Points per game	**Bold**	Career high
*	Led the league

=== NBA ===
==== Regular season ====
Year	Team	GP	GS	MPG	FG%	FT%	RPG	APG	PPG
1955–56	New York	60		21.5	.403	.708	7.4	.7	7.8
1956–57	Minneapolis	71		26.3	.364	.689	11.2	.8	10.1
1957–58	Detroit	72*		30.3	.349	.675	13.3	.7	11.2
1958–59	Detroit	72*		**32.5**	.352	.657	13.3	.9	13.0
1959–60	Detroit	66		32.4	.361	**.740**	13.4	1.2	**15.2**
1960–61	Detroit	73		28.0	**.405**	.703	**14.1**	**1.9**	11.7
1961–62	Detroit	**77**		24.6	.396	.715	10.4	1.6	9.4
1962–63	Detroit	62		14.7	.325	.737	5.8	.9	4.3
Career		553		26.5	.369	.700	11.3	1.1	10.4
All-Star		2	1	21.5	.313	.667	9.5	1.0	6.0

==== Playoffs ====
Year	Team	GP	MPG	FG%	FT%	RPG	APG	PPG
1957	Minneapolis	5	35.4	.421	.741	14.8	1.0	13.6
1958	Detroit	7	**40.9**	.366	.661	13.9	.6	15.9
1959	Detroit	3	37.7	.500	.765	13.3	1.0	14.3
1960	Detroit	2	39.0	**.516**	.727	**16.5**	1.0	**24.0**
1961	Detroit	5	30.4	.377	.556	9.8	2.2	10.0
1962	Detroit	**10**	34.7	.429	.754	13.8	**2.4**	12.4
1963	Detroit	3	2.7	–	**1.000**	.3	.7	1.0
Career		35	33.2	.416	.711	12.3	1.5	12.8
