= Bob Williams (basketball, born 1931) =

American basketball player (1931–2021)

Personal information
- Born: May 12, 1931 Pensacola, Florida, U.S.
- Died: January 19, 2021 (aged 89) Rosemount, Minnesota, U.S.
- Listed height: 6 ft 6 in (1.98 m)
- Listed weight: 230 lb (104 kg)

Career information
- High school: Booker T. Washington (Pensacola, Florida)
- College: Florida A&M (1950–1951)
- Position: Small forward
- Number: 33

Career history
- 1955–1957: Minneapolis Lakers
- 1956–1958: Harlem Globetrotters
- Stats at NBA.com
- Stats at Basketball Reference

Robert Lee Williams (May 12, 1931 – January 19, 2021) was an American professional basketball player. He played in the National Basketball Association for the Minneapolis Lakers during the 1955–56 season and part of the 1956–57 season. Williams was the Lakers franchise's first black player.

Williams died in his Rosemont, Minnesota, home on January 19, 2021, at age 89.

== Career statistics ==
Legend
GP	Games played	GS	Games started	MPG	Minutes per game
FG%	Field goal percentage	3P%	3-point field goal percentage	FT%	Free throw percentage
RPG	Rebounds per game	APG	Assists per game	SPG	Steals per game
BPG	Blocks per game	PPG	Points per game	**Bold**	Career high

=== NBA ===
==== Regular season ====
Year	Team	GP	MPG	FG%	FT%	RPG	APG	PPG
1955–56	Minneapolis	**20**	**8.7**	**.457**	.533	**2.7**	**.4**	**3.3**
1956–57	Minneapolis	4	5.0	.250	**.667**	1.3	.0	1.0
Career		24	8.0	.440	.542	2.5	.3	2.9
