= Johnny Horan =

American basketball player (1932–1980)

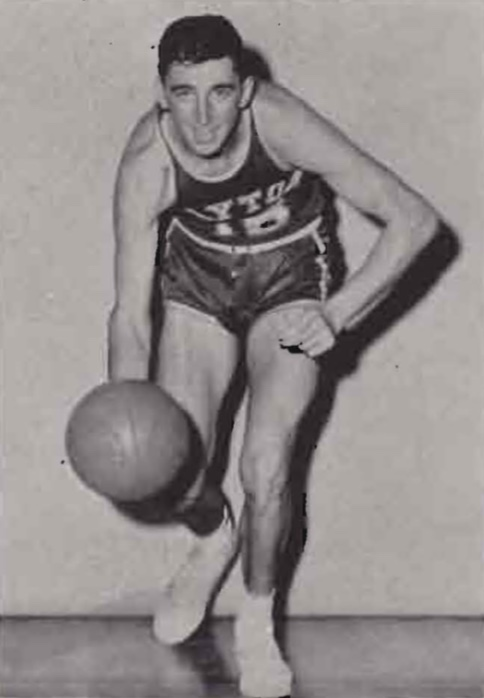
- Horan from the 1955 Daytonian

Personal information
- Born: November 24, 1932 Minneapolis, Minnesota
- Died: November 14, 1980 (aged 47) Houston, Texas
- Listed height: 6 ft 8 in (2.03 m)
- Listed weight: 190 lb (86 kg)

Career information
- High school: Saint Thomas Military Academy (Saint Paul, Minnesota)
- College: Dayton (1951–1955)
- NBA draft: 1955: 1st round, 6th overall pick
- Drafted by: Fort Wayne Pistons
- Playing career: 1955–1956
- Position: Small forward
- Number: 15

Career history
- 1955: Fort Wayne Pistons
- 1955–1956: Minneapolis Lakers

Career highlights
- Third-team All-American – UPI (1955)

Career NBA statistics
- Points: 34 (1.8 ppg)
- Rebounds: 10 (0.5 rpg)
- Assists: 2 (0.1 apg)
- Stats at NBA.com
- Stats at Basketball Reference

John F. Horan (November 24, 1932 – November 14, 1980), also nicknamed "The Vertical Hyphen," was an American professional basketball player. Horan was selected in the 1955 NBA draft (first round, sixth overall) by the Fort Wayne Pistons after a collegiate career at Dayton. He played for the Pistons in seven games before being traded to the Minneapolis Lakers in the middle of the 1955–56 season. While with the Lakers, Horan appeared in 12 games.

== Career statistics ==
Legend
GP	Games played	GS	Games started	MPG	Minutes per game
FG%	Field goal percentage	3P%	3-point field goal percentage	FT%	Free throw percentage
RPG	Rebounds per game	APG	Assists per game	SPG	Steals per game
BPG	Blocks per game	PPG	Points per game	**Bold**	Career high

=== NBA ===
==== Regular season ====
Year	Team	GP	MPG	FG%	FT%	RPG	APG	PPG
1955–56	Fort Wayne	7	**6.1**	**.308**	**1.000**	**.6**	**.1**	**3.1**
1955–56	Minneapolis	**12**	4.2	.250	.800	.5	**.1**	1.0
Career		19	4.9	.286	.909	.5	.1	1.8
