= 1955 NBA draft =

Basketball player selection

General information
- Sport: Basketball
- Date: April 13, 1955
- Location: New York City, New York
- Network: NBC

Overview
- 95 total selections in 14 rounds
- League: NBA
- Teams: 8
- Territorial picks: Dick Garmaker, Minneapolis Lakers; Tom Gola, Philadelphia Warriors
- First selection: Dick Ricketts, Milwaukee Hawks
- Hall of Famers: 4: G Tom Gola; F Maurice Stokes; G Jack Twyman; G K. C. Jones

The 1955 NBA draft was the ninth annual draft of the National Basketball Association (NBA). The draft was held on April 13, 1955, before the 1955–56 season. In this draft, eight remaining NBA teams took turns selecting amateur U.S. college basketball players. In each round, the teams select in reverse order of their win–loss record in the previous season. The Milwaukee Hawks participated in the draft, but relocated to St. Louis, Missouri, and became the St. Louis Hawks prior to the start of the season. The draft consisted of 15 rounds comprising 96 players selected.

== Draft selections and draftee career notes ==
Dick Ricketts from Duquesne University was selected first overall by the Milwaukee Hawks. Second pick of the draft, Maurice Stokes from Saint Francis University won the Rookie of the Year Award. Dick Garmaker and Tom Gola were selected before the draft as Minneapolis Lakers' and Philadelphia Warriors' territorial picks respectively. Three players from this draft, Maurice Stokes, Tom Gola, and Jack Twyman, have been inducted to the Basketball Hall of Fame. K. C. Jones, who was selected by the Minneapolis Lakers in the later rounds, has also been inducted to the Basketball Hall of Fame, although he did not enter the league immediately after the draft. In the 1956 draft, he was selected in the second round by the Boston Celtics, with whom he played for in his whole career. During this draft, the Philadelphia Warriors would be the first team to select a high school senior for a future draft as a territorial pick under a new rule that was implemented at the time that allowed them to select a high school senior that was within the team's territorial rights at the time by selecting Wilt Chamberlain from Overbrook High School. Chamberlain would later be selected officially as a territorial pick by the Warriors four years later in 1959 after he played for the Harlem Globetrotters by that time, eventually having a record-holding career that would be more than worthy for the Naismith Basketball Hall of Fame.

== Key ==
Pos.	G	F	C
Position	Guard	Forward	Center

^	Denotes player who has been inducted to the Naismith Memorial Basketball Hall of Fame
*	Denotes player who has been selected for at least one All-Star Game and All-NBA Team
^{+}	Denotes player who has been selected for at least one All-Star Game
^{#}	Denotes player who has never appeared in an NBA regular-season or playoff game
^{~}	Denotes player who has been selected as Rookie of the Year

== Draft ==
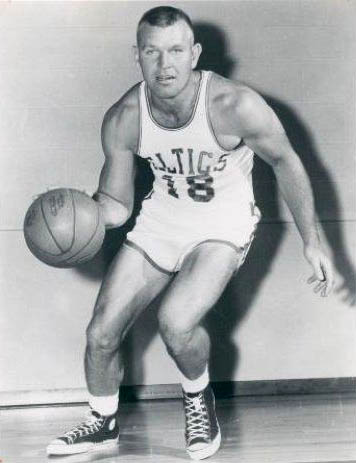
Jim Loscutoff, selected by the Boston Celtics.

Round	Pick	Player	Position	Nationality	Team	College
T	–	Dick Garmaker*	G/F	United States	Minneapolis Lakers	Minnesota
T	–	Tom Gola^	G/F	United States	Philadelphia Warriors	La Salle
1	1	Dick Ricketts	F/C	United States	Milwaukee Hawks	Duquesne
1	2	Maurice Stokes^^{~}	F/C	United States	Rochester Royals	Saint Francis (PA)
1	3	Jim Loscutoff	F	United States	Boston Celtics	Oregon
1	4	Ken Sears^{+}	F	United States	New York Knicks	Santa Clara
1	5	Ed Conlin	G/F	United States	Syracuse Nationals	Fordham
1	6	Johnny Horan	F	United States	Fort Wayne Pistons	Dayton
2	7	Jack Stephens	G/F	United States	Milwaukee Hawks	Notre Dame
2	8	Jack Twyman^	G/F	United States	Rochester Royals	Cincinnati
2	9	Walter Devlin	G	United States	Philadelphia Warriors	George Washington
2	10	Dickie Hemric	F	United States	Boston Celtics	Wake Forest
2	11	Jerry Mullen^{#}	F	United States	New York Knicks	San Francisco
2	12	Chuck Mencel	G	United States	Minneapolis Lakers	Minnesota
2	13	Jesse Arnelle	F	United States	Fort Wayne Pistons	Penn State
2	14	Don Schlundt^{#}	C	United States	Syracuse Nationals	Indiana

== Other picks ==
The following list includes other draft picks who have appeared in at least one NBA game.

Round	Pick	Player	Position	Nationality	Team	College
3	15	Al Ferrari	G/F	United States	Milwaukee Hawks	Michigan State
3	16	Ed Fleming	G/F	United States	Rochester Royals	Niagara
3	17	Bob Schafer	G	United States	Philadelphia Warriors	Villanova
3	19	Guy Sparrow	F	United States	New York Knicks	Detroit
10	76	K. C. Jones^	G	United States	Minneapolis Lakers	San Francisco
12	87	Bob Armstrong	F/C	United States	Rochester Royals	Michigan State

== Notable undrafted players ==
These players were not selected in the 1955 NBA draft but played at least one game in the NBA.

Player	Pos.	Nationality	School/club team
Chris Harris	SG	United Kingdom	Dayton (Sr.)
Med Park	SG/SF	United States	Missouri (Sr.)

== See also ==
- List of first overall NBA draft picks
