= NBA territorial pick =

Special draft choice used in the 1949 Basketball Association of America draft

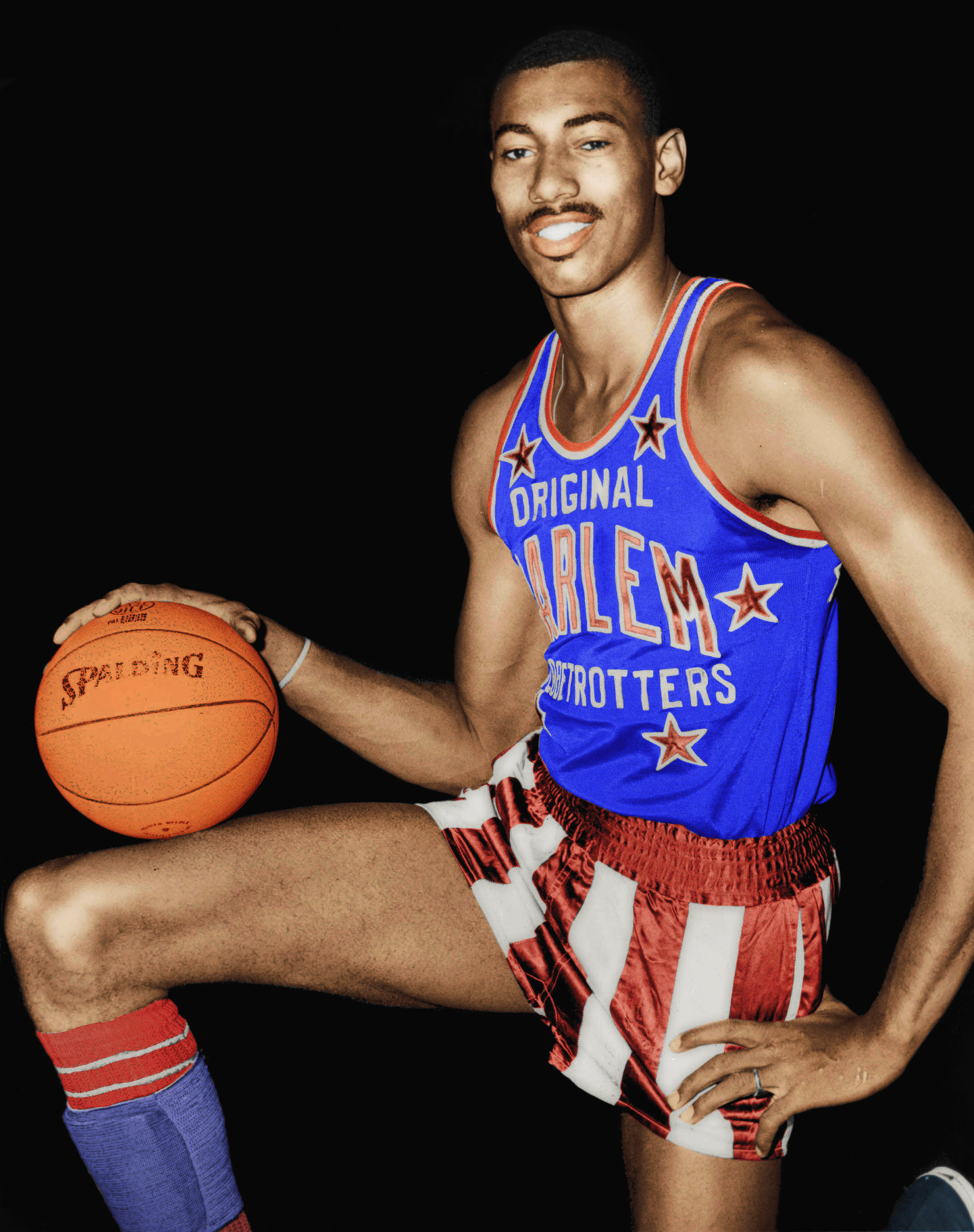
Wilt Chamberlain was selected as the Philadelphia Warriors' territorial pick in 1959.

A territorial pick was a type of special draft choice used in the Basketball Association of America (BAA) draft in 1949 and in the National Basketball Association (NBA) draft after the 1950 season, the year in which the BAA was renamed the NBA. In the draft, NBA teams took turns selecting amateur U.S. college basketball players. Territorial picks were eliminated when the draft system was revamped in 1966.

In the first 20 years of the BAA/NBA, the league was still trying to gain the support of fans who lived in or near the teams' home markets. To achieve this, the league introduced the territorial pick rule to help teams acquire popular players from colleges in their area who would presumably have strong local support. Before the draft, a team could forfeit its first-round draft pick and then select any player from within a 50-mile (80 km) radius of its home arena. As a result of the territorial picks being selected before the draft, these picks were not factored into the overall selection count of the draft; therefore, the first non-territorial pick of the draft was considered the first overall pick.

Of the 23 territorial picks, 12 players have been inducted into the Naismith Memorial Basketball Hall of Fame. Tom Heinsohn, Wilt Chamberlain, Oscar Robertson and Jerry Lucas are the only four territorial picks who won the Rookie of the Year Award. Chamberlain also won the Most Valuable Player Award in his rookie season. He went on to win the Most Valuable Player Award three more times in his career. Oscar Robertson is the only other territorial pick who has won the Most Valuable Player Award; he won it in the 1963–64 season. The Philadelphia Warriors had the most territorial picks, having selected seven who attended a total of five colleges. The University of Cincinnati had the most players taken as a territorial pick; three Cincinnati players were selected using this method by the Cincinnati Royals. The 1965 NBA draft, the last draft in which the rule remained in effect, had the most territorial picks in a single draft with three. The 1953 draft also had three territorial picks. No territorial pick was selected in the 1954, 1957 and 1961 drafts.

== Key ==
Pos.	G	F	C
Position	Guard	Forward	Center

^	Denotes player who has been inducted to the Naismith Memorial Basketball Hall of Fame
*	Denotes player who has been selected for at least one All-Star Game and All-NBA Team
^{+}	Denotes player who has been selected for at least one All-Star Game

== List of territorial picks ==
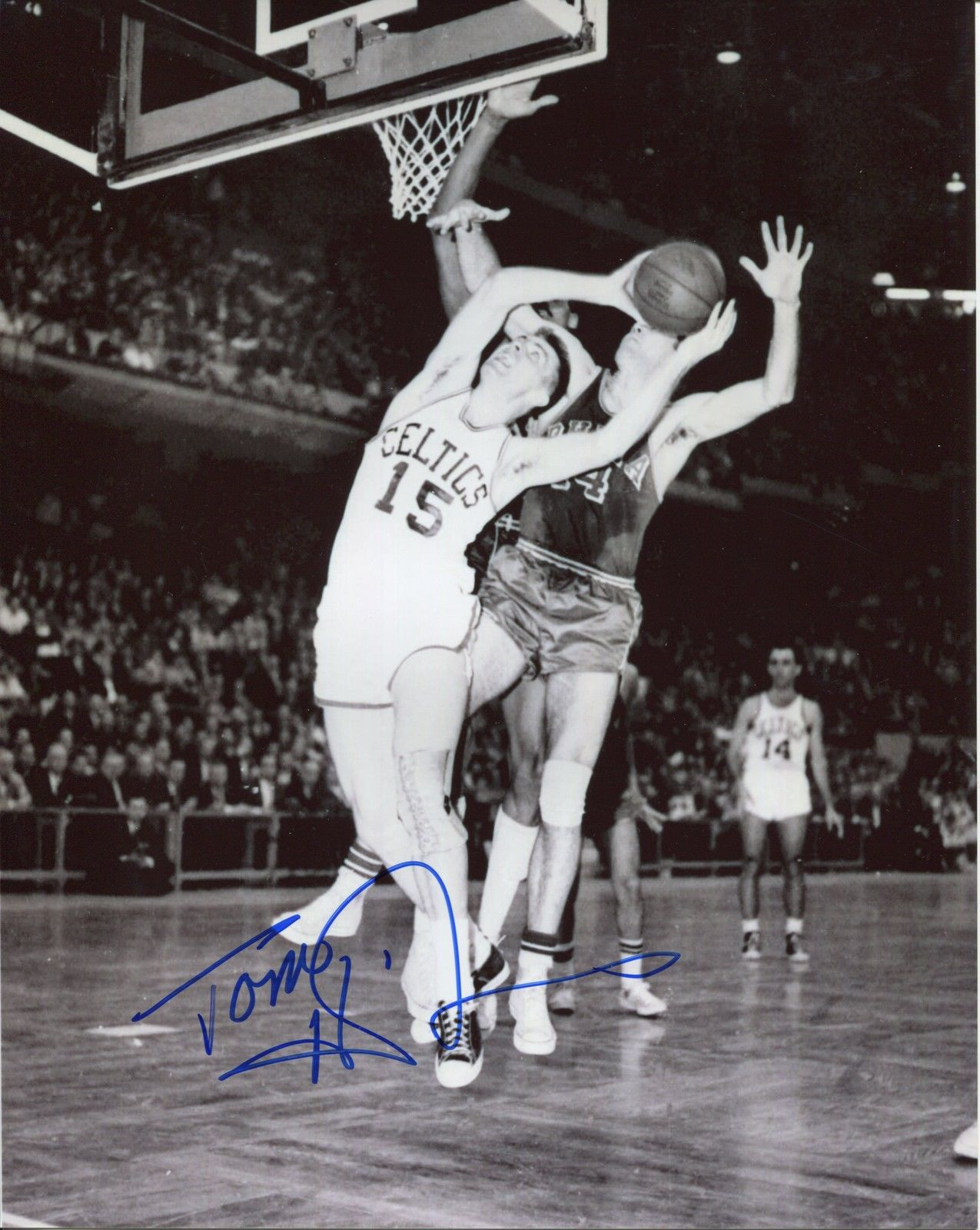
Tom Heinsohn was selected as the Boston Celtics' territorial pick in 1956.

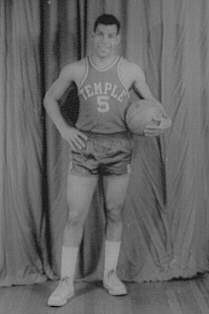
Guy Rodgers was selected as the Philadelphia Warriors' territorial pick in 1958.

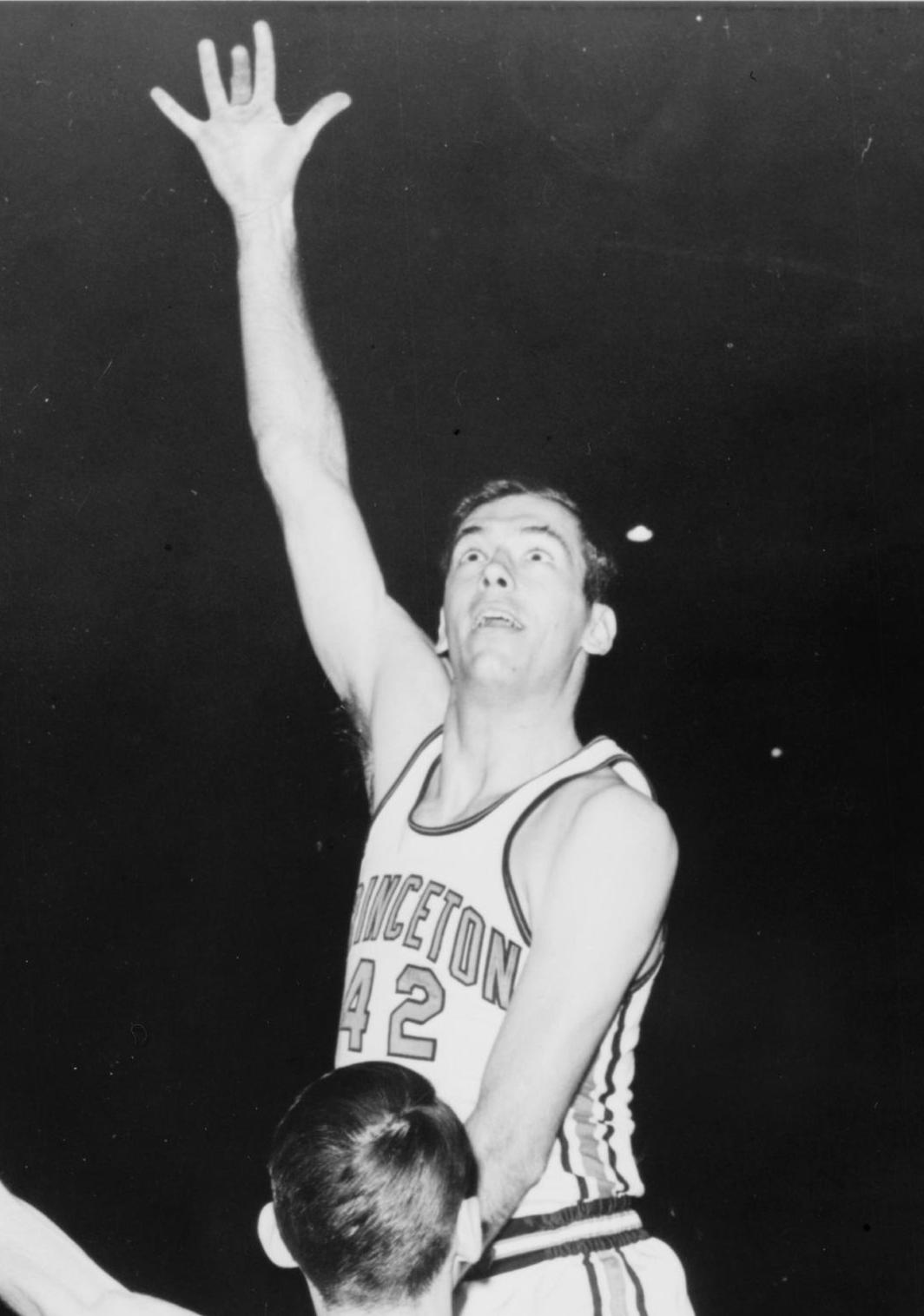
Bill Bradley was selected as the New York Knicks' territorial pick in 1965.

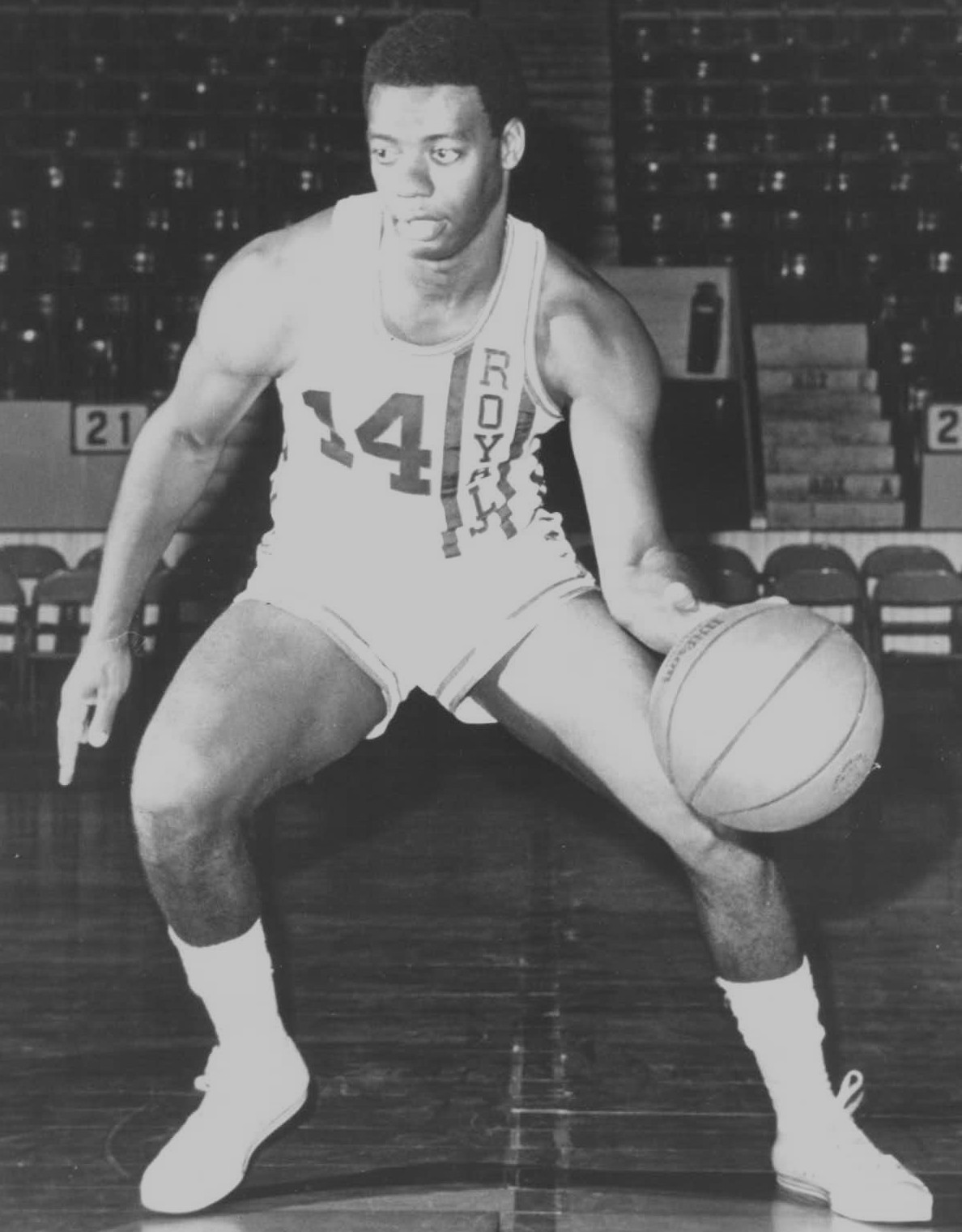
Oscar Robertson was selected as the Cincinnati Royals' territorial pick in 1960.

Year	Player	Pos.	Nationality	Team	College (city)	Ref.
1949	Ed Macauley^	F/C	United States	St. Louis Bombers	Saint Louis University (St. Louis, Missouri)	
1949	Vern Mikkelsen^	F/C	United States	Minneapolis Lakers	Hamline University (Saint Paul, Minnesota)	
1950	Paul Arizin^	G/F	United States	Philadelphia Warriors	Villanova University (Philadelphia)	
1951	Whitey Skoog	G	United States	Minneapolis Lakers	University of Minnesota (Minneapolis)	
1952	Bill Mlkvy	F	United States	Philadelphia Warriors	Temple University (Philadelphia)	
1953	Ernie Beck	G/F	United States	Philadelphia Warriors	University of Pennsylvania (Philadelphia)	
1953	Walter Dukes^{+}	C	United States	New York Knicks	Seton Hall University (South Orange, New Jersey)	
1953	Larry Hennessy	G	United States	Philadelphia Warriors	Villanova University (Philadelphia)	
1955	Dick Garmaker*	G/F	United States	Minneapolis Lakers	University of Minnesota (Minneapolis)	
1955	Tom Gola^	G/F	United States	Philadelphia Warriors	La Salle University (Philadelphia)	
1956	Tom Heinsohn^	F/C	United States	Boston Celtics	College of the Holy Cross (Worcester, Massachusetts)	
1958	Guy Rodgers^	G	United States	Philadelphia Warriors	Temple University (Philadelphia)	
1959	Wilt Chamberlain^	C	United States	Philadelphia Warriors^{[a]}	University of Kansas (Lawrence, Kansas)	
1959	Bob Ferry	F/C	United States	St. Louis Hawks	Saint Louis University (St. Louis, Missouri)	
1960	Oscar Robertson^^{[b]}	G/F	United States	Cincinnati Royals	University of Cincinnati (Cincinnati)	
1962	Dave DeBusschere^	G/F	United States	Detroit Pistons	University of Detroit (Detroit)	
1962	Jerry Lucas^	F/C	United States	Cincinnati Royals^{[c]}	Ohio State University (Columbus, Ohio)	
1963	Tom Thacker	G/F	United States	Cincinnati Royals	University of Cincinnati (Cincinnati)	
1964	Walt Hazzard^{+}	G	United States	Los Angeles Lakers	UCLA (Los Angeles)	
1964	George Wilson	C	United States	Cincinnati Royals	University of Cincinnati (Cincinnati)	
1965	Bill Bradley^	G/F	United States	New York Knicks	Princeton University (Princeton, New Jersey)	
1965	Bill Buntin	F/C	United States	Detroit Pistons	University of Michigan (Ann Arbor, Michigan)	
1965	Gail Goodrich^	G	United States	Los Angeles Lakers	UCLA (Los Angeles)	

== See also ==
- KHL territorial pick
- CFL territorial pick

== Notes ==
- ^{a} Although Wilt Chamberlain was playing at the University of Kansas, outside the territory of any NBA team, he was selected as the Philadelphia Warriors' territorial pick. The Warriors argued that because Chamberlain had grown up in Philadelphia and played high school basketball at Overbrook High School in Philadelphia, they held his territorial rights. The NBA agreed with the argument, hence making him the first and only territorial pick based solely on his pre-college roots.
- ^{b} Although Oscar Robertson was drafted as a territorial pick, he was also recognized as the first pick in the first round of the draft as the Cincinnati Royals also held the first overall draft pick.
- ^{c} Although Jerry Lucas was playing at Ohio State University, outside the territory of the Cincinnati Royals, the Royals were the only NBA team in Ohio, so the NBA granted them the rights to pick Lucas as their territorial pick. Lucas also qualified under the same criterion as Chamberlain, as he grew up in Middletown, Ohio and played high school basketball at Middletown High School, which was within Cincinnati's territorial radius.
