= 1955–56 Minneapolis Lakers season =

NBA professional basketball team season

- Head coach: John Kundla
- Arena: Minneapolis Auditorium

Results
- Record: 33–39 (.458)
- Place: Division: 2nd (Western)
- Playoff finish: Division semifinals (lost to Hawks 1–2)
- Stats at Basketball Reference

Local media
- Television: KEYD-TV (Jack Horner)
- Radio: WLOL (Dick Enroth)

The 1955–56 Minneapolis Lakers season was the Lakers' eighth season playing in the NBA.

== Roster ==
1955–56 Minneapolis Lakers roster
Players

Pos.	No.	Player	Height	Weight	DOB	From
G	22	Ron Feiereisel	6 ft 3 in (1.91 m)	185 lb (84 kg)	1931-08-06	DePaul
G	16	Dick Garmaker	6 ft 3 in (1.91 m)	200 lb (91 kg)	1932-10-29	Minnesota
F	11	Lew Hitch	6 ft 8 in (2.03 m)	200 lb (91 kg)	1929-07-16	Kansas State
F		Johnny Horan	6 ft 8 in (2.03 m)	190 lb (86 kg)	1932-11-24	Dayton
F	23	Ed Kalafat	6 ft 6 in (1.98 m)	245 lb (111 kg)	1932-10-13	Minnesota
C	34	Clyde Lovellette	6 ft 9 in (2.06 m)	234 lb (106 kg)	1929-09-07	Kansas
G	22	Slater Martin	5 ft 10 in (1.78 m)	170 lb (77 kg)	1925-10-22	Texas
G	18	Chuck Mencel	6 ft 0 in (1.83 m)	168 lb (76 kg)	1933-04-21	Minnesota
C	99	George Mikan	6 ft 10 in (2.08 m)	245 lb (111 kg)	1924-06-18	DePaul
F	19	Vern Mikkelsen	6 ft 7 in (2.01 m)	230 lb (104 kg)	1928-10-21	Hamline
F	15	Dick Schnittker	6 ft 5 in (1.96 m)	200 lb (91 kg)	1928-05-27	Ohio State
G	20	Whitey Skoog	5 ft 11 in (1.80 m)	180 lb (82 kg)	1926-11-02	Minnesota
F	33	Bob Williams	6 ft 6 in (1.98 m)	230 lb (104 kg)	1931-05-12	Florida A&M

Coaches
Head coach

John Kundla

Legend
- (DP) Unsigned draft pick
- (FA) Free agent
- (S) Suspended
- Injured

Roster

== Regular season ==
=== Season standings ===
Western Division	W	L	PCT	GB	Home	Road	Neutral	Div
x-Fort Wayne Pistons	37	35	.514	-	19-7	10-17	8-11	19-17
x-Minneapolis Lakers	33	39	.458	4	14-12	6-21	13-6	19-17
x-St. Louis Hawks	33	39	.458	4	15-11	11-17	7-11	18-18
Rochester Royals	31	41	.431	6	15-14	6-21	10-6	16-20

x – clinched playoff spot

=== Game log ===
#	Date	Opponent	Score	High points	Record
1	November 5	@ St. Louis	89–101	Clyde Lovellette (27)	0–1
2	November 6	@ Fort Wayne	96–95	Clyde Lovellette (31)	1–1
3	November 9	@ Philadelphia	106–117	Clyde Lovellette (21)	1–2
4	November 10	@ New York	105–112	Clyde Lovellette (22)	1–3
5	November 11	@ Boston	75–119	Dick Schnittker (12)	1–4
6	November 12	N Philadelphia	100–89	Vern Mikkelsen (19)	1–5
7	November 17	@ Syracuse	91–105	Kalafat, Mikkelsen (15)	1–6
8	November 19	@ Rochester	91–90	Clyde Lovellette (26)	2–6
9	November 20	Rochester	104–96	Clyde Lovellette (21)	2–7
10	November 24	St. Louis	99–107	Lovellette, Mikkelsen (19)	3–7
11	November 26	@ St. Louis	95–104	Clyde Lovellette (25)	3–8
12	November 27	Philadelphia	94–99	Clyde Lovellette (25)	4–8
13	November 30	N St. Louis	99–97	Clyde Lovellette (20)	4–9
14	December 1	N New York	90–97	Clyde Lovellette (21)	5–9
15	December 3	@ Syracuse	103–114	Clyde Lovellette (25)	5–10
16	December 4	Syracuse	102–96	Clyde Lovellette (26)	5–11
17	December 6	N Philadelphia	116–103	Clyde Lovellette (27)	5–12
18	December 7	@ Rochester	79–92	Kalafat, Schnittker (17)	5–13
19	December 10	@ Boston	102–118	Clyde Lovellette (21)	5–14
20	December 13	@ New York	91–98	Clyde Lovellette (31)	5–15
21	December 14	N Fort Wayne	98–85	Clyde Lovellette (22)	6–15
22	December 15	@ Syracuse	135–133 (3OT)	Clyde Lovellette (30)	7–15
23	December 17	Rochester	92–94	Clyde Lovellette (21)	8–15
24	December 18	@ Fort Wayne	86–96	Slater Martin (19)	8–16
25	December 20	N Boston	104–111	Vern Mikkelsen (22)	8–17
26	December 25	Boston	115–112	Clyde Lovellette (35)	8–18
27	December 28	St. Louis	111–90	Clyde Lovellette (26)	8–19
28	December 29	N St. Louis	71–74	Clyde Lovellette (17)	9–19
29	January 1	Syracuse	85–80	Clyde Lovellette (23)	9–20
30	January 2	N Fort Wayne	95–89	Slater Martin (26)	10–20
31	January 4	St. Louis	76–94	Clyde Lovellette (28)	11–20
32	January 7	@ Rochester	98–103	Clyde Lovellette (32)	11–21
33	January 8	Syracuse	91–99	Clyde Lovellette (26)	12–21
34	January 10	N Syracuse	79–90	Garmaker, Lovellette, Mikkelsen (16)	13–21
35	January 11	N Boston	114–110	Clyde Lovellette (24)	14–21
36	January 14	Fort Wayne	94–117	Clyde Lovellette (22)	15–21
37	January 15	@ Fort Wayne	99–104	Slater Martin (24)	15–22
38	January 17	N St. Louis	86–97	Clyde Lovellette (22)	16–22
39	January 18	N Philadelphia	94–105	Clyde Lovellette (31)	17–22
40	January 19	@ Syracuse	100–122	Clyde Lovellette (17)	17–23
41	January 20	N New York	122–109	Clyde Lovellette (27)	17–24
42	January 21	@ New York	109–89	George Mikan (20)	18–24
43	January 22	New York	100–95	Whitey Skoog (19)	18–25
44	January 25	New York	95–104	Clyde Lovellette (21)	19–25
45	January 28	Philadelphia	108–85	Dick Garmaker (17)	19–26
46	January 29	St. Louis	114–107	Dick Schnittker (22)	19–27
47	January 31	N Rochester	86–92	Clyde Lovellette (20)	20–27
48	February 1	Boston	106–107	Lovellette, Martin (21)	21–27
49	February 2	N Boston	101–102	Clyde Lovellette (21)	21–28
50	February 5	Rochester	121–109	Vern Mikkelsen (27)	21–29
51	February 8	Fort Wayne	82–106	Whitey Skoog (25)	22–29
52	February 11	Philadelphia	117–102	Clyde Lovellette (32)	22–30
53	February 12	@ Fort Wayne	78–82	Clyde Lovellette (16)	22–31
54	February 14	N Rochester	79–110	Clyde Lovellette (22)	23–31
55	February 15	N New York	102–113	Clyde Lovellette (20)	24–31
56	February 17	@ Philadelphia	111–134	Clyde Lovellette (24)	24–32
57	February 18	@ Rochester	119–99	Whitey Skoog (23)	25–32
58	February 19	Rochester	93–100	Clyde Lovellette (19)	26–32
59	February 22	Boston	93–90	Whitey Skoog (20)	26–33
60	February 26	Fort Wayne	95–90	George Mikan (17)	26–34
61	February 29	N Syracuse	94–98	Clyde Lovellette (30)	27–34
62	March 1	@ Philadelphia	102–100	Clyde Lovellette (24)	28–34
63	March 2	@ Boston	113–119	Lovellette, Skoog (23)	28–35
64	March 3	@ Rochester	90–94	Clyde Lovellette (22)	28–36
65	March 4	St. Louis	84–113	Clyde Lovellette (24)	29–36
66	March 7	Fort Wayne	95–98	Clyde Lovellette (25)	30–36
67	March 8	@ Fort Wayne	82–100	Slater Martin (18)	30–37
68	March 9	@ St. Louis	102–103	Dick Schnittker (24)	30–38
69	March 10	@ St. Louis	97–105	Clyde Lovellette (20)	30–39
70	March 11	Rochester	98–126	Clyde Lovellette (24)	31–39
71	March 13	N New York	89–102	Clyde Lovellette (19)	32–39
72	March 14	Fort Wayne	96–100	Ed Kalafat (21)	33–39

== Playoffs ==
1956 playoff game log
Division Tiebreaker (finishes as West's #2 seed)

Game	Date	Team	Score	High points	Location	Record
1	March 16	@ St. Louis	W 103–97	Slater Martin (28)	Kiel Auditorium	1–0

Division semifinals: 1–2 (home: 1–1; road: 0–1)

Game	Date	Team	Score	High points	Location	Series
1	March 17	@ St. Louis	L 115–116	Mikkelsen, Martin (19)	Kiel Auditorium	0–1
2	March 19	St. Louis	W 133–75	Slater Martin (19)	Minneapolis Auditorium	1–1
3	March 21	St. Louis	L 115–116	Clyde Lovellette (31)	Minneapolis Auditorium	1–2

1956 schedule

== Awards and records ==
- Slater Martin, All-NBA Second Team
- Clyde Lovellette, All-NBA Second Team
- Slater Martin, NBA All-Star Game
- Clyde Lovellette, NBA All-Star Game
- Vern Mikkelsen, NBA All-Star Game
