= 1956–57 Minneapolis Lakers season =

NBA professional basketball team season

- Head coach: John Kundla
- Arena: Minneapolis Auditorium

Results
- Record: 34–38 (.472)
- Place: Division: 2nd (Western)
- Playoff finish: Division finals (lost to Hawks 0–3)
- Stats at Basketball Reference

The 1956–57 Minneapolis Lakers season was the Lakers' ninth season in the NBA.

== Roster ==
1956–57 Minneapolis Lakers roster
Players

Pos.	No.	Player	Height	Weight	DOB	From
C	24	Walter Dukes	7 ft 0 in (2.13 m)	220 lb (100 kg)	1930-06-23	Seton Hall
G	16	Dick Garmaker	6 ft 3 in (1.91 m)	200 lb (91 kg)	1932-10-29	Minnesota
F	23	Ed Kalafat	6 ft 6 in (1.98 m)	245 lb (111 kg)	1932-10-13	Minnesota
G	21	Slick Leonard	6 ft 3 in (1.91 m)	185 lb (84 kg)	1932-07-17	Indiana
C	34	Clyde Lovellette	6 ft 9 in (2.06 m)	234 lb (106 kg)	1929-09-07	Kansas
G	18	Chuck Mencel	6 ft 0 in (1.83 m)	168 lb (76 kg)	1933-04-21	Minnesota
F	19	Vern Mikkelsen	6 ft 7 in (2.01 m)	230 lb (104 kg)	1928-10-21	Hamline
F	11	Jim Paxson Sr.	6 ft 6 in (1.98 m)	200 lb (91 kg)	1932-12-19	Dayton
F	15	Dick Schnittker	6 ft 5 in (1.96 m)	200 lb (91 kg)	1928-05-27	Ohio State
G	20	Whitey Skoog	5 ft 11 in (1.80 m)	180 lb (82 kg)	1926-11-02	Minnesota
F	33	Bob Williams	6 ft 6 in (1.98 m)	230 lb (104 kg)	1931-05-12	Florida A&M

Coaches
Head coach

John Kundla

Legend
- (DP) Unsigned draft pick
- (FA) Free agent
- (S) Suspended
- Injured

Roster

== Regular season ==
=== Season standings ===
Western Division	W	L	PCT	GB	Home	Road	Neutral	Div
x-St. Louis Hawks	34	38	.472	-	17-9	10-20	7-9	22-14
x-Minneapolis Lakers	34	38	.472	-	15-9	5-22	14-7	18-18
x-Fort Wayne Pistons	34	38	.472	-	23-5	5-23	6-10	17-19
Rochester Royals	31	41	.431	3	19-10	7-17	5-14	15-21

x – clinched playoff spot

=== Game log ===
#	Date	Opponent	Score	High points	Record
1	October 27	@ St. Louis	75–97	Clyde Lovellette (16)	0–1
2	October 28	@ Fort Wayne	88–94	Clyde Lovellette (19)	0–2
3	November 1	N Rochester	88–97	Whitey Skoog (20)	1–2
4	November 3	@ Rochester	95–85	Clyde Lovellette (20)	2–2
5	November 4	Rochester	87–88	Clyde Lovellette (23)	3–2
6	November 10	@ Boston	110–117	Clyde Lovellette (26)	3–3
7	November 11	N Rochester	94–82	Clyde Lovellette (18)	3–4
8	November 14	N Boston	113–97	Ed Kalafat (20)	4–4
9	November 15	@ Syracuse	103–96	Clyde Lovellette (28)	5–4
10	November 16	@ Philadelphia	97–123	Clyde Lovellette (25)	5–5
11	November 18	Fort Wayne	111–107	Chuck Mencel (26)	5–6
12	November 22	Syracuse	78–111	Clyde Lovellette (22)	6–6
13	November 24	@ St. Louis	104–102 (OT)	Dick Garmaker (25)	7–6
14	November 25	St. Louis	95–94	Dick Garmaker (24)	7–7
15	November 27	N Philadelphia	98–113	Clyde Lovellette (26)	8–7
16	November 28	N Boston	93–105	Clyde Lovellette (22)	8–8
17	December 1	@ Rochester	83–95	Clyde Lovellette (24)	8–9
18	December 2	Philadelphia	96–106	Chuck Mencel (21)	9–9
19	December 4	@ New York	88–101	Clyde Lovellette (21)	9–10
20	December 6	N St. Louis	96–103	Dick Garmaker (30)	10–10
21	December 7	@ Boston	114–121	Clyde Lovellette (24)	10–11
22	December 9	New York	100–91	Ed Kalafat (18)	10–12
23	December 11	@ Philadelphia	111–114	Clyde Lovellette (28)	10–13
24	December 12	N New York	103–121	Clyde Lovellette (29)	11–13
25	December 16	Rochester	97–101	Clyde Lovellette (26)	12–13
26	December 20	N Rochester	103–105	Clyde Lovellette (33)	13–13
27	December 22	@ Rochester	101–115	Clyde Lovellette (17)	13–14
28	December 23	@ Syracuse	97–107	Clyde Lovellette (23)	13–15
29	December 25	N Fort Wayne	100–89	Clyde Lovellette (23)	14–15
30	December 27	@ Fort Wayne	93–120	Clyde Lovellette (19)	14–16
31	December 29	St. Louis	95–92	Clyde Lovellette (22)	14–17
32	December 30	@ St. Louis	93–100	Clyde Lovellette (19)	14–18
33	January 3	@ Fort Wayne	102–104	Clyde Lovellette (24)	14–19
34	January 6	New York	111–101	Clyde Lovellette (29)	14–20
35	January 8	N Fort Wayne	86–87	Clyde Lovellette (23)	14–21
36	January 9	N Syracuse	86–93	Bobby Leonard (19)	15–21
37	January 10	@ Syracuse	118–110	Clyde Lovellette (29)	16–21
38	January 12	N Fort Wayne	105–87	Clyde Lovellette (24)	17–21
39	January 13	Boston	87–104	Vern Mikkelsen (23)	18–21
40	January 17	N New York	94–93	Vern Mikkelsen (26)	18–22
41	January 20	Rochester	107–114	Vern Mikkelsen (27)	19–22
42	January 23	N Rochester	99–107	Garmaker, Leonard (21)	20–22
43	January 25	@ Boston	106–115	Dick Garmaker (24)	20–23
44	January 26	@ New York	107–122	Clyde Lovellette (30)	20–24
45	January 27	@ Syracuse	93–94	Clyde Lovellette (20)	20–25
46	January 28	N Syracuse	112–96	Dick Garmaker (28)	20–26
47	January 29	N Boston	91–103	Clyde Lovellette (29)	20–27
48	January 31	Fort Wayne	111–107	Clyde Lovellette (26)	20–28
49	February 2	St. Louis	106–97	Vern Mikkelsen (21)	20–29
50	February 3	@ St. Louis	85–102	Clyde Lovellette (20)	20–30
51	February 6	Philadelphia	100–101	Chuck Mencel (28)	21–30
52	February 9	Fort Wayne	92–99	Bobby Leonard (17)	22–30
53	February 10	@ Fort Wayne	100–113	Dick Garmaker (23)	22–31
54	February 12	N St. Louis	105–110	Dick Garmaker (22)	23–31
55	February 13	Boston	114–115	Walter Dukes (22)	24–31
56	February 14	N New York	97–99	Clyde Lovellette (22)	25–31
57	February 15	N Philadelphia	104–105	Jim Paxson (22)	25–32
58	February 16	@ New York	112–120	Clyde Lovellette (21)	25–33
59	February 17	St. Louis	118–115 (OT)	Dick Garmaker (24)	25–34
60	February 20	Rochester	103–111	Vern Mikkelsen (24)	26–34
61	February 23	Syracuse	103–101	Clyde Lovellette (26)	26–35
62	February 24	Fort Wayne	115–123	Dick Garmaker (29)	27–35
63	February 25	N St. Louis	110–94	Dick Garmaker (27)	27–36
64	February 26	@ Syracuse	108–120	Dick Garmaker (22)	27–37
65	February 28	@ Philadelphia	112–129	Clyde Lovellette (18)	27–38
66	March 1	N Rochester	117–125	Dick Garmaker (30)	28–38
67	March 3	New York	108–119	Dick Garmaker (29)	29–38
68	March 7	Boston	104–109	Vern Mikkelsen (24)	30–38
69	March 8	@ Fort Wayne	101–97	Dick Garmaker (20)	31–38
70	March 10	St. Louis	104–117	Clyde Lovellette (32)	32–38
71	March 12	N Philadelphia	94–100	Clyde Lovellette (25)	33–38
72	March 13	Philadelphia	97–114	Vern Mikkelsen (35)	34–38

== Playoffs ==
1957 playoff game log
Division Tiebreaker (finishes as West's #2 seed)

Game	Date	Team	Score	High points	High rebounds	Location	Record
1	March 16	@ St. Louis	L 111–114 (OT)	Clyde Lovellette (30)	Lovellette, Dukes (12)	Kiel Auditorium	0–1

Division semifinals: 2–0 (home: 1–0; road: 1–0)

Game	Date	Team	Score	High points	Location	Series
1	March 17	Fort Wayne	W 131–127	Clyde Lovellette (30)	Minneapolis Auditorium	1–0
2	March 19	@ Fort Wayne	W 110–108	Slick Leonard (19)	War Memorial Coliseum	2–0

Division finals: 0–3 (home: 0–1; road: 0–2)

Game	Date	Team	Score	High points	High rebounds	High assists	Location Attendance	Series
1	March 21	@ St. Louis	L 109–118	Vern Mikkelsen (24)	Clyde Lovellette (11)	Slick Leonard (9)	Kiel Auditorium; 6,028	0–1
2	March 24	@ St. Louis	L 104–106	Clyde Lovellette (33)	Walter Dukes (20)	—	Kiel Auditorium; 9,451	0–2
3	March 26	St. Louis	L 135–143 (2OT)	Slick Leonard (42)	—	—	Minneapolis Auditorium	0–3

1957 schedule

== Awards and records ==
- Dick Garmaker, All-NBA Second Team
- Dick Garmaker, NBA All-Star Game
- Vern Mikkelsen, NBA All-Star Game
- Slater Martin, NBA All-Star Game
