= 1957–58 Minneapolis Lakers season =

NBA professional basketball team season

- Head coach: George Mikan (9–30); John Kundla (10–23)
- Arena: Minneapolis Auditorium

Results
- Record: 19–53 (.264)
- Place: Division: 4th (Western)
- Playoff finish: Did not qualify
- Stats at Basketball Reference

The 1957–58 Minneapolis Lakers season was the Lakers' tenth season in the NBA.

== Roster ==
1957–58 Minneapolis Lakers roster
Players

Pos.	No.	Player	Height	Weight	DOB	From
F	22	George Brown	6 ft 6 in (1.98 m)	190 lb (86 kg)	1935-10-30	Wayne State (MI)
C	50	Bob Burrow	6 ft 7 in (2.01 m)	228 lb (103 kg)	1934-06-29	Kentucky
G	13	Corky Devlin	6 ft 5 in (1.96 m)	195 lb (88 kg)	1931-12-21	George Washington
F	24	Bo Erias	6 ft 3 in (1.91 m)	220 lb (100 kg)	1932-07-30	Niagara
F	50−70	Ed Fleming	6 ft 3 in (1.91 m)	189 lb (86 kg)	1933-07-25	Niagara
C	14	Larry Foust	6 ft 9 in (2.06 m)	215 lb (98 kg)	1928-06-24	La Salle
G	16	Dick Garmaker	6 ft 3 in (1.91 m)	200 lb (91 kg)	1932-10-29	Minnesota
G	33	Hot Rod Hundley	6 ft 4 in (1.93 m)	185 lb (84 kg)	1934-10-26	West Virginia
F	22	McCoy Ingram	6 ft 8 in (2.03 m)	210 lb (95 kg)	1931-08-31	Jackson State
C	32	Jim Krebs	6 ft 8 in (2.03 m)	230 lb (104 kg)	1935-09-08	SMU
G	21	Slick Leonard	6 ft 3 in (1.91 m)	185 lb (84 kg)	1932-07-17	Indiana
F	19	Vern Mikkelsen	6 ft 7 in (2.01 m)	230 lb (104 kg)	1928-10-21	Hamline
F	15	Dick Schnittker	6 ft 5 in (1.96 m)	200 lb (91 kg)	1928-05-27	Ohio State
G	11	Frank Selvy	6 ft 3 in (1.91 m)	180 lb (82 kg)	1932-11-09	Furman
C	27	Art Spoelstra	6 ft 9 in (2.06 m)	220 lb (100 kg)	1932-09-11	Western Kentucky

Coaches
Head coach

John Kundla

Legend
- (DP) Unsigned draft pick
- (FA) Free agent
- (S) Suspended
- Injured

Roster

== Regular season ==
=== Season standings ===
Western Division	W	L	PCT	GB	Home	Road	Neutral	Div
x-St. Louis Hawks	41	31	.569	-	23-8	8-19	10-4	24-12
x-Detroit Pistons	33	39	.458	8	14-14	13-17	6-8	18-18
x-Cincinnati Royals	33	39	.458	8	17-12	10-19	6-8	17-19
Minneapolis Lakers	19	53	.264	22	10-15	4-21	5-17	13-23

x – clinched playoff spot

=== Game log ===
#	Date	Opponent	Score	High points	Record
1	October 26	@ St. Louis	84–112	Bobby Leonard (21)	0–1
2	October 30	Detroit	115–96	Dick Schnittker (17)	0–2
3	November 1	@ Syracuse	100–113	Larry Foust (24)	0–3
4	November 2	@ Philadelphia	108–118	Vern Mikkelsen (24)	0–4
5	November 6	Boston	103–94	Dick Garmaker (26)	0–5
6	November 8	N Philadelphia	119–108	Art Spoelstra (21)	0–6
7	November 12	N Boston	104–107	Bobby Leonard (25)	0–7
8	November 13	New York	106–124	Vern Mikkelsen (26)	1–7
9	November 15	@ Detroit	112–104	Dick Schnittker (22)	2–7
10	November 17	Syracuse	110–98	Larry Foust (21)	2–8
11	November 20	New York	105–101	Vern Mikkelsen (19)	2–9
12	November 21	N New York	124–123 (OT)	Larry Foust (29)	2–10
13	November 23	@ Boston	107–131	Larry Foust (27)	2–11
14	November 24	@ Philadelphia	98–105	Dick Garmaker (28)	2–12
15	November 26	N Detroit	91–109	Vern Mikkelsen (20)	2–13
16	November 27	N Cincinnati	106–107	Dick Schnittker (24)	2–14
17	November 30	St. Louis	113–118	Larry Foust (36)	3–14
18	December 1	@ Cincinnati	89–90	Dick Garmaker (20)	3–15
19	December 3	N St. Louis	115–108	Dick Garmaker (30)	3–16
20	December 4	Boston	108–98	Larry Foust (19)	3–17
21	December 7	Syracuse	113–121	Garmaker, Leonard (21)	4–17
22	December 10	N Syracuse	114–104	Dick Garmaker (22)	4–18
23	December 11	Syracuse	95–110	Dick Garmaker (26)	5–18
24	December 15	St. Louis	138–118	Vern Mikkelsen (27)	5–19
25	December 18	Philadelphia	102–108	Vern Mikkelsen (23)	6–19
26	December 21	@ Boston	119–140	Larry Foust (27)	6–20
27	December 22	@ St. Louis	115–123	Larry Foust (30)	6–21
28	December 25	@ Detroit	106–104	Larry Foust (24)	7–21
29	December 28	Cincinnati	112–101	Dick Garmaker (32)	7–22
30	December 29	@ Cincinnati	111–103	Garmaker, Mikkelsen (21)	8–22
31	December 30	N St. Louis	105–98	Vern Mikkelsen (20)	8–23
32	December 31	@ New York	116–142	Corky Devlin (17)	8–24
33	January 1	@ Syracuse	109–120	Dick Garmaker (33)	8–25
34	January 5	N Boston	100–113	Bobby Leonard (19)	8–26
35	January 8	Boston	107–87	Vern Mikkelsen (23)	8–27
36	January 9	@ Syracuse	122–127	Foust, Mikkelsen (23)	8–28
37	January 10	N Detroit	124–114	Foust, Garmaker (23)	9–28
38	January 11	@ Detroit	102–129	Larry Foust (20)	9–29
39	January 12	@ St. Louis	105–111	Dick Garmaker (27)	9–30
40	January 16	@ Cincinnati	108–124	Foust, Mikkelsen (27)	9–31
41	January 17	N St. Louis	110–112 (OT)	Corky Devlin (31)	10–31
42	January 19	Detroit	111–118	Dick Garmaker (24)	11–31
43	January 22	Boston	97–87	Vern Mikkelsen (22)	11–32
44	January 23	Detroit	125–128 (OT)	Dick Garmaker (25)	12–32
45	January 25	@ New York	116–128	Bobby Leonard (25)	12–33
46	January 26	New York	109–106	Dick Garmaker (39)	12–34
47	January 27	N New York	113–102	Dick Garmaker (17)	12–35
48	January 30	Cincinnati	104–105	Vern Mikkelsen (33)	13–35
49	February 1	Syracuse	97–91	Larry Foust (23)	13–36
50	February 2	Cincinnati	95–106	Vern Mikkelsen (18)	14–36
51	February 4	N Philadelphia	107–103	Foust, Schnittker (23)	14–37
52	February 5	Philadelphia	112–102	Dick Schnittker (22)	14–38
53	February 7	@ Boston	88–114	Dick Garmaker (23)	14–39
54	February 8	@ New York	93–94	Bobby Leonard (17)	14–40
55	February 9	@ Cincinnati	104–121	Larry Foust (24)	14–41
56	February 11	N Cincinnati	103–106	Vern Mikkelsen (28)	14–42
57	February 12	New York	106–97	Larry Foust (17)	14–43
58	February 14	St. Louis	104–100	Dick Garmaker (21)	14–44
59	February 15	@ Detroit	111–110	Erias, Leonard (17)	15–44
60	February 16	Philadelphia	99–106	Vern Mikkelsen (31)	16–44
61	February 18	@ St. Louis	98–118	Vern Mikkelsen (18)	16–45
62	February 19	Detroit	117–115 (OT)	Vern Mikkelsen (28)	16–46
63	February 22	Cincinnati	81–100	Vern Mikkelsen (23)	17–46
64	February 23	@ Cincinnati	93–111	Ed Fleming (16)	17–47
65	February 24	N Philadelphia	110–95	Dick Garmaker (25)	17–48
66	February 26	@ Syracuse	90–119	Vern Mikkelsen (26)	17–49
67	February 27	N Detroit	109–112	Ed Fleming (19)	17–50
68	March 2	Philadelphia	92–102	Vern Mikkelsen (33)	18–50
69	March 6	Detroit	132–116	Larry Foust (20)	18–51
70	March 8	@ St. Louis	123–126	Vern Mikkelsen (28)	18–52
71	March 9	St. Louis	99–107	Frank Selvy (26)	19–52
72	March 12	Cincinnati	96–89	Vern Mikkelsen (24)	19–53

== Awards and records ==
- Dick Garmaker, NBA All-Star Game
- Larry Foust, NBA All-Star Game
