= Ed Kalafat =

American basketball player (1932–2019)

Personal information
- Born: October 13, 1932 Anaconda, Montana, U.S.
- Died: October 7, 2019 (aged 86) Saint Paul, Minnesota, U.S.
- Listed height: 6 ft 6 in (1.98 m)
- Listed weight: 245 lb (111 kg)

Career information
- High school: Anaconda (Anaconda, Montana)
- College: Minnesota (1951–1954)
- NBA draft: 1954: 1st round, 9th overall pick
- Drafted by: Minneapolis Lakers
- Playing career: 1954–1957
- Position: Center / power forward
- Number: 23

Career history
- 1954–1957: Minneapolis Lakers

Career highlights
- AP Honorable mention All-American (1954); 2x Second-team All-Big Ten (1952, 1953)
- Stats at NBA.com
- Stats at Basketball Reference

Edward Lawrence Kalafat (October 13, 1932 – October 7, 2019) was an American basketball player. A center, he played college basketball for the Minnesota Golden Gophers and professionally for three seasons with the Minneapolis Lakers.

== Biography ==
Kalafat was born on October 13, 1932, in Anaconda, Montana. He played football and basketball at Anaconda High School, winning a state championship in 1948.

After high school, he went on to play for the University of Minnesota. He was the team's starting center from 1951 to 1954 and served as captain in the 1953–1954 season. He won the team MVP award his senior season.

After graduation, he was selected by the Lakers in the first round of the 1954 NBA draft with the ninth overall pick. He played three seasons with the Lakers, averaging 7.1 points and 5.7 rebounds per game. Kalafat retired after the Lakers traded him to the Detroit Pistons in 1957.

After retiring from basketball Kalafat went into banking, working for many years at First Bank System. He also joined the U.S. Army Reserve, retiring at the rank of captain.

== Career statistics ==
Legend
| GP | Games played | GS | Games started | MPG | Minutes per game |
| FG% | Field goal percentage | 3P% | 3-point field goal percentage | FT% | Free throw percentage |
| RPG | Rebounds per game | APG | Assists per game | SPG | Steals per game |
| BPG | Blocks per game | PPG | Points per game | **Bold** | Career high |

=== NBA ===
==== Regular season ====
| Year | Team | GP | MPG | FG% | FT% | RPG | APG | PPG |
|---|---|---|---|---|---|---|---|---|
| 1954–55 | Minneapolis | **72** | 15.3 | .315 | .661 | 4.4 | 1.0 | 4.8 |
| 1955–56 | Minneapolis | **72** | 22.8 | **.359** | **.738** | 6.1 | **1.8** | 8.0 |
| 1956–57 | Minneapolis | 65 | **24.9** | .351 | .661 | **6.5** | 1.6 | **8.5** |
| Career | | 209 | 20.9 | .345 | .688 | 5.7 | 1.5 | 7.1 |

==== Playoffs ====
| Year | Team | GP | MPG | FG% | FT% | RPG | APG | PPG |
|---|---|---|---|---|---|---|---|---|
| 1954–55 | Minneapolis | **7** | 10.9 | .091 | .300 | 2.6 | .0 | 1.0 |
| 1955–56 | Minneapolis | 3 | 18.3 | .429 | **.789** | **7.0** | .7 | 11.0 |
| 1956–57 | Minneapolis | 5 | **20.8** | **.583** | .677 | 4.8 | **1.8** | **12.6** |
| Career | | 15 | 15.7 | .405 | .650 | 4.2 | .7 | 6.9 |
