= Dick Schnittker =

American basketball player (1928–2020)

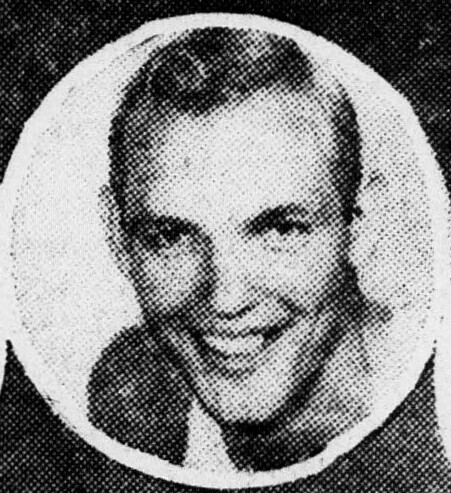
- Schnittker, circa 1950

Personal information
- Born: May 27, 1928 Kelleys Island, Ohio, U.S.
- Died: January 12, 2020 (aged 91) Green Valley, Arizona, U.S.
- Listed height: 6 ft 5 in (1.96 m)
- Listed weight: 200 lb (91 kg)

Career information
- High school: Sandusky (Sandusky, Ohio)
- College: Ohio State (1946–1950)
- NBA draft: 1950: 1st round, 4th overall pick
- Drafted by: Washington Capitols
- Playing career: 1950–1958
- Position: Power forward
- Number: 22, 24, 15

Career history
- 1950–1952: Washington Capitols
- 1953–1958: Minneapolis Lakers

Career highlights
- 2× NBA champion (1953, 1954); Consensus first-team All-American (1950); Third-team All-American – AP, UPI (1949); 2× First-team All-Big Ten (1949, 1950)

Career statistics
- Points: 3,028 (8.3 ppg)
- Rebounds: 1,372 (3.8 rpg)
- Assists: 480 (1.3 apg)
- Stats at NBA.com
- Stats at Basketball Reference

Richard Dean Schnittker (May 27, 1928 – January 12, 2020) was an American professional basketball player born in Kelleys Island, Ohio.

A 6'5" power forward from the Ohio State University, Schnittker played six seasons (1950–1951; 1953–1958) in the National Basketball Association (NBA) as a member of the Washington Capitols and Minneapolis Lakers. He averaged 8.3 points per game and won championships with the Lakers in 1953 and 1954. Schnittker's debut for the Lakers in the 1952–53 season occurred during the playoffs. He was the first player to see action in the Finals after not playing a game during the preceding regular season, a feat later equalled by Tom Hoover in 1966 and Tracy McGrady in 2013.

In college Schnittker also played end on the Ohio State football team during the 1949 season. After starting end Sonny Gandee went down with a season-ending neck injury, coach Wes Fesler recruited Schnittker to take Gandee's place. Schnittker helped the team to a Big Ten championship and Rose Bowl appearance. He died on January 12, 2020, at the age of 91.

== NBA career statistics ==
Legend
GP	Games played	GS	Games started	MPG	Minutes per game
FG%	Field goal percentage	3P%	3-point field goal percentage	FT%	Free throw percentage
RPG	Rebounds per game	APG	Assists per game	SPG	Steals per game
BPG	Blocks per game	PPG	Points per game	**Bold**	Career high
†	Won an NBA championship

=== Regular season ===
Year	Team	GP	MPG	FG%	FT%	RPG	APG	PPG
1950–51	Washington	29	–	**.411**	**.866**	**5.3**	1.4	10.2
1953–54†	Minneapolis	71	14.6	.397	.652	2.5	0.8	4.6
1954–55	Minneapolis	**72**	25.0	.388	.823	4.8	1.6	10.4
1955–56	Minneapolis	**72**	**26.8**	.393	.856	4.1	**2.0**	**11.3**
1956–57	Minneapolis	70	14.2	.322	.829	2.6	0.7	5.5
1957–58	Minneapolis	50	19.6	.359	.848	4.2	1.4	9.1
Career		364	20.1	.379	.825	3.8	1.3	8.3

=== Playoffs ===
Year	Team	GP	MPG	FG%	FT%	RPG	APG	PPG
1953†	Minneapolis	7	4.1	.125	.636	0.6	0.0	1.3
1954†	Minneapolis	**13**	12.5	.344	.600	1.6	0.4	2.6
1955	Minneapolis	7	20.0	.275	.694	4.4	1.0	7.6
1956	Minneapolis	3	**29.0**	**.565**	.850	**5.0**	**1.7**	**14.3**
1957	Minneapolis	5	16.6	.286	**.882**	2.4	1.6	5.4
Career		35	14.3	.333	.731	2.4	0.7	4.7
