= Chuck Mencel =

American basketball player

Personal information
- Born: April 21, 1933 (age 93) Phillips, Wisconsin, U.S.
- Listed height: 6 ft 0 in (1.83 m)
- Listed weight: 168 lb (76 kg)

Career information
- High school: Eau Claire (Eau Claire, Wisconsin)
- College: Minnesota (1951–1955)
- NBA draft: 1955: 2nd round, 12th overall pick
- Drafted by: Minneapolis Lakers
- Playing career: 1955–1957
- Position: Point guard
- Number: 18

Career history
- 1955–1957: Minneapolis Lakers

Career highlights
- Third-team All-American – UPI (1953); 2× First-team All-Big Ten (1953, 1955); 2× Second-team All-Big Ten (1952, 1954); No. 30 retired by Minnesota Golden Gophers

Career NBA statistics
- Points: 983 (7.0 ppg)
- Rebounds: 347 (2.5 rpg)
- Assists: 333 (2.4 apg)
- Stats at NBA.com
- Stats at Basketball Reference

Charles J. Mencel (born April 21, 1933) is an American former professional basketball player with the Minneapolis Lakers.

Mencel played collegiately at the University of Minnesota, and was named the Big Ten MVP in the 1955 season, his senior year with the Golden Gophers. He was drafted in the second round of the 1955 NBA draft by the Lakers. He played two seasons with the club, with a career average of 7.0 points per game.

With the death of Frank Selvy, Mencel is the last living Minneapolis Laker.

== Career statistics ==
Legend
GP	Games played	GS	Games started	MPG	Minutes per game
FG%	Field goal percentage	3P%	3-point field goal percentage	FT%	Free throw percentage
RPG	Rebounds per game	APG	Assists per game	SPG	Steals per game
BPG	Blocks per game	PPG	Points per game	**Bold**	Career high
*	Led the league

=== NBA ===
==== Regular season ====
Year	Team	GP	MPG	FG%	FT%	RPG	APG	PPG
1955–56	Minneapolis	69	14.1	.320	**.813**	1.6	1.9	4.6
1956–57	Minneapolis	**72***	**25.7**	**.353**	.746	**3.3**	**2.8**	**9.2**
Career		141	20.0	.341	.765	2.5	2.4	7.0

==== Playoffs ====
Year	Team	GP	MPG	FG%	FT%	RPG	APG	PPG
1956	Minneapolis	3	17.3	**.526**	**.857**	1.7	**2.7**	**8.7**
1957	Minneapolis	**5**	**19.6**	.250	.778	**2.6**	1.2	5.0
Career		8	18.8	.345	.813	2.3	1.8	6.4
