= Whitey Skoog =

American basketball player (1926–2019)

Personal information
- Born: November 2, 1926 Duluth, Minnesota, U.S.
- Died: April 4, 2019 (aged 92) St. Peter, Minnesota, U.S.
- Listed height: 5 ft 11 in (1.80 m)
- Listed weight: 180 lb (82 kg)

Career information
- High school: Brainerd (Brainerd, Minnesota)
- College: Minnesota (1948–1951)
- NBA draft: 1951: territorial pick
- Drafted by: Minneapolis Lakers
- Playing career: 1951–1957
- Position: Point guard / shooting guard
- Number: 41, 20

Career history

Playing
- 1951–1957: Minneapolis Lakers

Coaching
- 1957–1981: Gustavus Adolphus

Career highlights
- As player: 3× NBA champion (1952, 1953, 1954); Second-team All-American – AP (1950); Second-team All-American – Look, Collier's (1951); 2× Third-team All-American – AP (1949, 1951); Third-team All-American – UPI (1951); 2× First-team All-Big Ten (1950, 1951); Second-team All-Big Ten (1949); No. 41 retired by Minnesota Golden Gophers; As coach: MIAC regular season champion (1968, 1975)

Career statistics
- Points: 2,800 (8.2 ppg)
- Rebounds: 1,133 (3.3 rpg)
- Assists: 903 (2.6 apg)
- Stats at NBA.com
- Stats at Basketball Reference

Myer Upton "Whitey" Skoog (November 2, 1926 – April 4, 2019) was an American professional basketball player for the National Basketball Association's Minneapolis Lakers. He was born in Duluth, Minnesota.

A 5 ft 11 in (180 cm) and 180 lb (82 kg) guard, Skoog played collegiately at the University of Minnesota. Following his All-America senior season, he was drafted as a territorial pick in the first round of the 1951 NBA draft by the Lakers.

The Lakers won three NBA Championships in his first three years in the league. Skoog played in six seasons in the NBA before back injuries forced his retirement. Some credit Skoog with being the creator of the jump shot and one of the first players to use a jump shot in an organized game. Following his career in the NBA, Skoog became the men's basketball coach and golf coach at Gustavus Adolphus College. He was the men's basketball coach from 1957 to 1981, and the men's golf coach from 1973 to 1996. He was inducted into the school's hall of fame in 1987. Skoog retired from coaching in 1997, and he continued to live in St. Peter, Minnesota.

Skoog resided in a skilled nursing facility in St. Peter in his later years. He died on April 4, 2019, at the age of 92.

== Career statistics ==
Legend
GP	Games played	GS	Games started	MPG	Minutes per game
FG%	Field goal percentage	3P%	3-point field goal percentage	FT%	Free throw percentage
RPG	Rebounds per game	APG	Assists per game	SPG	Steals per game
BPG	Blocks per game	PPG	Points per game	**Bold**	Career high
†	Won an NBA championship	*	Led the league

=== NBA ===
==== Regular season ====
Year	Team	GP	MPG	FG%	FT%	RPG	APG	PPG
1951–52†	Minneapolis	35	28.2	.345	.789	3.5	1.7	6.7
1952–53†	Minneapolis	68	14.6	.386	.754	1.8	1.2	3.7
1953–54†	Minneapolis	71	26.4	**.400**	.742	3.2	2.5	7.2
1954–55	Minneapolis	**72**	**32.8**	.395	.806	**4.2**	**3.5**	10.9
1955–56	Minneapolis	**72**	32.1	.398	.803	4.0	**3.5**	**11.6**
1956–57	Minneapolis	23	28.5	.355	**.936**	3.1	3.3	8.7
Career		341	27.0	.388	.799	3.3	2.6	8.2

==== Playoffs ====
Year	Team	GP	MPG	FG%	FT%	RPG	APG	PPG
1953†	Minneapolis	11	18.0	**.429**	.800	2.1	1.2	5.8
1954†	Minneapolis	**13***	30.9	.393	.571	3.6	1.8	7.4
1955	Minneapolis	7	**34.4**	.391	**.905**	5.3	2.3	**13.0**
1956	Minneapolis	3	30.0	.419	.273	**6.0**	**6.0**	9.7
Career		34	27.4	.402	.685	3.7	2.1	8.2
