= Vern Mikkelsen =

American basketball player (1928–2013)

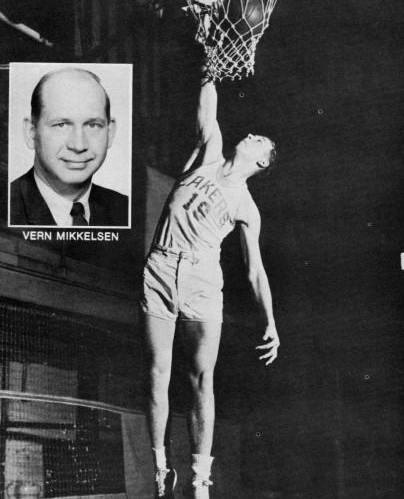
- Mikkelsen, circa 1950s

Personal information
- Born: October 21, 1928 Parlier, California, U.S.
- Died: November 21, 2013 (aged 85) Wayzata, Minnesota, U.S.
- Listed height: 6 ft 7 in (2.01 m)
- Listed weight: 230 lb (104 kg)

Career information
- High school: Askov (Askov, Minnesota)
- College: Hamline (1945–1949)
- BAA draft: 1949: territorial pick
- Drafted by: Minneapolis Lakers
- Playing career: 1949–1959
- Position: Power forward
- Number: 19

Career history

Playing
- 1949–1959: Minneapolis Lakers

Career highlights
- 4× NBA champion (1950, 1952–1954); 6× NBA All-Star (1951–1953, 1955–1957); 4× All-NBA Second Team (1951–1953, 1955); No. 19 honored by Los Angeles Lakers

Career statistics
- Points: 10,063 (14.4 ppg)
- Rebounds: 5,940 (9.4 rpg)
- Assists: 1,515 (2.2 apg)
- Stats at NBA.com
- Stats at Basketball Reference
- Basketball Hall of Fame
- Collegiate Basketball Hall of Fame

Arild Verner Agerskov Mikkelsen (October 21, 1928 – November 21, 2013) was an American professional basketball player. One of the National Basketball Association's first power forwards in the 1950s, he was known for his tenacious defense and durability, playing 699 out of a possible 704 games during his career. He was a six-time All-Star and four-time Second Team All-NBA, and was inducted into the NAIA Basketball Hall of Fame and the sport's Naismith Memorial Basketball Hall of Fame in 1995.

Along with fellow Hall of Famers George Mikan and Slater Martin he was a key part of four championships with the Minneapolis Lakers, today's Los Angeles Lakers.

Mikkelsen was also an All-American in college, and earned a master's degree from the University of Minnesota.

== Early life ==
Mikkelsen was born in Parlier, California and was raised in the Danish-American community of Askov, Minnesota. His father, Michael, was an immigrant from Denmark who became a Lutheran pastor in Askov.

== College career ==
Mikkelsen entered Hamline University in Saint Paul, Minnesota on a basketball scholarship at the age of 16. In his senior year, Mikkelsen led the National Association of Intercollegiate Athletics (NAIA) in field goal percentage. Hamline won the 1949 NAIA Division I men's basketball tournament and Mikkelsen was voted an All-American. He would later receive a master's degree in psychology from the University of Minnesota.

== Professional career ==
=== Minneapolis Lakers (1949-1960) ===
Mikkelsen played with George Mikan and Jim Pollard in the frontcourt of the Minneapolis Lakers. The Lakers won four NBA titles during Mikkelsen's career. Mikkelsen played in six NBA All-Star Games and was named to the All-NBA Second Team four times in his career.

Mikkelsen ended his career after ten seasons in the NBA in 1959, having played in 699 of a possible 704 regular-season games. He led the NBA in both personal fouls and fouling out of games for three straight seasons during his career, and finished his career with 10,063 points scored. Mikkelsen still holds the league record for career games fouling out with 127, which he did in only 631 games (the NBA did not record that statistic until his second season).

== Honors and awards ==
In 1956, Mikkelsen was inducted into the NAIA Basketball Hall of Fame.

Mikkelsen was inducted into the Naismith Memorial Basketball Hall of Fame in 1995 along with Laker coach John Kundla.

In 2002, during halftime of a Lakers/Timberwolves game, Mikkelsen and fellow Hall of Fame teammates George Mikan, Slater Martin, Arlee Pollard (widow of Jim Pollard), Clyde Lovellette and Coach John Kundla were each presented with championship rings. The Minneapolis players received the same rings provided by the NBA to the champion Los Angeles Lakers that same year.

== Coaching ==
Mikkelsen was involved with insurance when he was asked to do general managing for the Minnesota Muskies in April of 1968. He later coached and was general manager of the Minnesota Pipers of the American Basketball Association.

== Personal life and family ==
Mikkelsen's wife Jean died in 2002 after 47 years of marriage. Their two sons are named Tom and John. In 2006 a biography was published by John Egan titled The Vern Mikkelsen Story.

Mikkelsen died on November 21, 2013, in Wayzata, Minnesota surrounded by his family.

== NBA career statistics ==
Legend
GP	Games played	GS	Games started	MPG	Minutes per game
FG%	Field goal percentage	3P%	3-point field goal percentage	FT%	Free throw percentage
RPG	Rebounds per game	APG	Assists per game	SPG	Steals per game
BPG	Blocks per game	PPG	Points per game	**Bold**	Career high
†	Won an NBA championship

=== Regular season ===
Year	Team	GP	MPG	FG%	FT%	RPG	APG	PPG
1949–50†	Minneapolis	68	–	.399	.752	–	1.8	11.6
1950–51	Minneapolis	64	–	.402	.676	10.2	**2.8**	14.1
1951–52†	Minneapolis	66	35.5	.419	.761	10.3	2.7	15.3
1952–53†	Minneapolis	70	35.2	**.435**	.752	9.3	2.1	15.0
1953–54†	Minneapolis	**72**	31.2	.374	.742	8.5	1.7	11.1
1954–55	Minneapolis	71	**36.0**	.422	.747	10.2	2.0	**18.7**
1955–56	Minneapolis	**72**	29.2	.386	.804	8.4	2.4	13.4
1956–57	Minneapolis	**72**	30.5	.377	**.807**	8.8	1.7	13.7
1957–58	Minneapolis	**72**	33.2	.410	.786	**11.2**	2.3	17.3
1958–59	Minneapolis	**72**	29.7	.390	.806	7.9	2.2	13.8
Career		699	32.5	.403	.766	9.4	2.2	14.4
All-Star		6	18.3	.386	.650	8.7	1.3	11.2

=== Playoffs ===
Year	Team	GP	MPG	FG%	FT%	RPG	APG	PPG
1950†	Minneapolis	12	–	.369	.767	–	1.5	13.0
1951	Minneapolis	7	–	.406	.660	9.6	2.4	15.6
1952†	Minneapolis	**13**	**38.1**	.432	.828	8.5	1.5	13.3
1953†	Minneapolis	12	33.3	.331	.848	8.7	2.0	12.0
1954†	Minneapolis	**13**	28.8	**.459**	.861	5.6	1.3	10.2
1955	Minneapolis	7	29.9	.353	.783	**11.1**	1.9	13.7
1956	Minneapolis	3	30.0	.423	**.900**	5.7	0.7	13.3
1957	Minneapolis	5	32.4	.398	.647	8.6	**3.4**	**17.6**
1959	Minneapolis	**13**	28.5	.412	.767	7.2	1.8	15.5
Career		85	31.8	.396	.783	8.0	1.8	13.4

== Head coaching record ==
=== ABA ===
Legend
Regular season	G	Games coached	W	Games won	L	Games lost	W–L %	Win–loss %
Playoffs	PG	Playoff games	PW	Playoff wins	PL	Playoff losses	PW–L %	Playoff win–loss %

Team	Year	G	W	L	W–L%	Finish	PG	PW	PL	PW–L%	Result
Kentucky	1968–69	12	6	6	.500	(interim)	—	—	—	—	—
