= 1957 NBA Finals =

1957 basketball championship series

| Team | Coach | Wins |
|---|---|---|
| Boston Celtics | Red Auerbach | 4 |
| St. Louis Hawks | Alex Hannum | 3 |
- Dates: March 30–April 13
- Hall of Famers: Celtics: Bob Cousy (1971); Tom Heinsohn (1986); Andy Phillip (1961); Frank Ramsey (1982); Arnie Risen (1998); Bill Russell (1975); Bill Sharman (1976); Hawks: Bob Pettit (1970); Cliff Hagan (1978); Slater Martin (1982); Ed Macauley (1960); Coaches: Red Auerbach (1969); Alex Hannum (1998)
- Eastern finals: Celtics defeated Nationals, 3–0
- Western finals: Hawks defeated Lakers, 3–0

The 1957 NBA World Championship Series was the championship series of the 1956–57 National Basketball Association season, and was the conclusion of the 1957 NBA playoffs. The best-of-seven series was played between the Western Division champion St. Louis Hawks and the Eastern Division champion Boston Celtics. This was the first trip to the Finals for each team, the first Finals in which both teams competing were making their first appearances since 1951. Red Auerbach became the first head coach to have taken two separate teams to the NBA Finals, having done so with Washington in 1949. The Celtics won the series over the Hawks in seven games for their first championship in franchise history. It remains the only Game 7 in NBA Finals history to be decided in double-overtime.

This was the second meeting between teams from Boston and St. Louis for a major professional sports championship. The two cities have since met 11 total times, including at least once in all four major American sports leagues.

== Game summaries ==
| Game | Date | Home team | Result | Road team |
|---|---|---|---|---|
| Game 1 | March 30 | Boston Celtics | 123–125 (2OT) (0–1) | St. Louis Hawks |
| Game 2 | March 31 | Boston Celtics | 119–99 (1–1) | St. Louis Hawks |
| Game 3 | April 6 | St. Louis Hawks | 100–98 (2–1) | Boston Celtics |
| Game 4 | April 7 | St. Louis Hawks | 118–123 (2–2) | Boston Celtics |
| Game 5 | April 9 | Boston Celtics | 124–109 (3–2) | St. Louis Hawks |
| Game 6 | April 11 | St. Louis Hawks | 96–94 (3–3) | Boston Celtics |
| Game 7 | April 13 | Boston Celtics | 125–123 (2OT) (4–3) | St. Louis Hawks |

Celtics win series 4–3

== Team rosters ==
=== Boston Celtics ===
1956–57 Boston Celtics roster
Players

| Pos. | No. | Player | Height | Weight | DOB | From |
|---|---|---|---|---|---|---|
| G | 14 | Bob Cousy | 6 ft 1 in (1.85 m) | 175 lb (79 kg) | 1928-08-09 | Holy Cross |
| F/C | 15 | Tom Heinsohn | 6 ft 7 in (2.01 m) | 218 lb (99 kg) | 1934-08-26 | Holy Cross |
| F | 20 | Dick Hemric | 6 ft 6 in (1.98 m) | 220 lb (100 kg) | 1933-08-29 | Wake Forest |
| F | 18 | Jim Loscutoff | 6 ft 5 in (1.96 m) | 220 lb (100 kg) | 1930-02-04 | Oregon |
| F/C | 16 | Jack Nichols | 6 ft 7 in (2.01 m) | 222 lb (101 kg) | 1926-04-09 | Washington |
| G | 17 | Andy Phillip | 6 ft 2 in (1.88 m) | 195 lb (88 kg) | 1922-03-07 | Illinois |
| G/F | 23 | Frank Ramsey | 6 ft 3 in (1.91 m) | 190 lb (86 kg) | 1931-07-13 | Kentucky |
| F/C | 19 | Arnie Risen | 6 ft 9 in (2.06 m) | 200 lb (91 kg) | 1924-10-09 | Ohio State |
| C | 6 | Bill Russell | 6 ft 9 in (2.06 m) | 215 lb (98 kg) | 1934-02-12 | San Francisco |
| G | 21 | Bill Sharman | 6 ft 1 in (1.85 m) | 175 lb (79 kg) | 1926-05-25 | USC |
| F | 29 | Lou Tsioropoulos | 6 ft 5 in (1.96 m) | 190 lb (86 kg) | 1930-08-31 | Kentucky |

Coaches
Head coach
- Red Auerbach

Legend
- (DP) Unsigned draft pick
- (FA) Free agent
- (S) Suspended
- Injured

Roster

=== St. Louis Hawks ===
1956–57 St. Louis Hawks roster
Players

| Pos. | No. | Player | Height | Weight | DOB | From |
|---|---|---|---|---|---|---|
| SF | 26 | Irv Bemoras | 6 ft 3 in (1.91 m) | 185 lb (84 kg) | November 18, 1930 | Illinois |
| PF | 12 | Jack Coleman | 6 ft 7 in (2.01 m) | 195 lb (88 kg) | May 23, 1924 | Louisville |
| SF | 6, 17 | Cliff Hagan | 6 ft 4 in (1.93 m) | 210 lb (95 kg) | December 9, 1931 | Kentucky |
| PF | 33 | Alex Hannum | 6 ft 7 in (2.01 m) | 210 lb (95 kg) | July 19, 1923 | USC |
| PF | 20, 50 | Ed Macauley | 6 ft 8 in (2.03 m) | 185 lb (84 kg) | March 22, 1928 | Saint Louis |
| PG | 22 | Slater Martin | 5 ft 10 in (1.78 m) | 170 lb (77 kg) | October 22, 1925 | Texas |
| SG | 21 | Jack McMahon | 6 ft 1 in (1.85 m) | 185 lb (84 kg) | December 3, 1928 | St. John's |
| SG | 32 | Med Park | 6 ft 2 in (1.88 m) | 205 lb (93 kg) | April 11, 1933 | Missouri |
| C | 9 | Bob Pettit | 6 ft 9 in (2.06 m) | 205 lb (93 kg) | December 12, 1932 | LSU |
| C | 70 | Chuck Share | 6 ft 11 in (2.11 m) | 235 lb (107 kg) | March 14, 1927 | Bowling Green |

Coaches
Head coach
- Alex Hannum

Legend
- (DP) Unsigned draft pick
- (FA) Free agent
- (S) Suspended
- Injured

Roster

== Box scores ==
March 30

Boxscore

St. Louis Hawks 125, Boston Celtics 123 (2OT)
Scoring by quarter: 31–21, 18–26, 22–27, 31–28, Overtime: 11–11, 12–10
| Pts: Bob Pettit 37; Rebs: Bob Pettit 14 | Pts: Bill Sharman 36; Rebs: Bill Russell 18 |
St. Louis leads series, 1–0

Boston Garden, Boston, Massachusetts
Attendance: 5,976

- Tom Heinsohn hits the game-tying lay-up with 6 seconds left in regulation to force the first OT; Bob Cousy hits the game-tying shot with 15 seconds left in the first OT to force the second OT.

March 31

Boxscore

St. Louis Hawks 99, Boston Celtics 119
Scoring by quarter: 21–31, 22–31, 27–32, 29–25
| Pts: Ed Macauley 19; Rebs: Bob Pettit 13; Asts: Slick Leonard 4 | Pts: Cousy, Ramsey 22 each Rebs: Bill Russell 25; Asts: Bob Cousy 7 |
Series tied, 1–1

Boston Garden, Boston, Massachusetts
Attendance: 13,909
Referees: Mendy Rudolph, Sid Borgia

April 6

Boxscore

Boston Celtics 98, St. Louis Hawks 100
Scoring by quarter: 19–19, 25–21, 28–29, 26–31
| Pts: Bill Sharman 28; Rebs: Bill Russell 19; Asts: Bob Cousy 8 | Pts: Bob Pettit 26; Rebs: Bob Pettit 28; Asts: three players 5 each |
St. Louis leads series, 2–1

Kiel Auditorium, St. Louis, Missouri
Attendance: 10,048

- Bob Pettit hits the game-winner with 45 seconds left.

April 7

Boxscore

Boston Celtics 123, St. Louis Hawks 118
Scoring by quarter: 31–36, 35–17, 30–37, 27–28
| Pts: Bob Cousy 31; Rebs: Bill Russell 20; Asts: Arnie Risen 9 | Pts: Bob Pettit 33; Rebs: Bob Pettit 16; Asts: Martin, Hagan 6 each |
Series tied, 2–2

Kiel Auditorium, St. Louis, Missouri
Attendance: 10,035
Referees: Sid Borgia, Arnie Heft

April 9

Boxscore

St. Louis Hawks 109, Boston Celtics 124
Scoring by quarter: 30–21, 30–38, 25–35, 24–30
| Pts: Bob Pettit 33; Rebs: Bob Pettit 15; Asts: Med Park 6 | Pts: Bill Sharman 32; Rebs: Bill Russell 23; Asts: Bob Cousy 19 |
Boston leads series, 3–2

Boston Garden, Boston, Massachusetts
Attendance: 13,909

April 11

Boxscore

Boston Celtics 94, St. Louis Hawks 96
Scoring by quarter: 23–22, 28–27, 27–28, 16–19
| Pts: Tom Heinsohn 28; Rebs: Bill Russell 23 | Pts: Bob Pettit 32; Rebs: Bob Pettit 23 |
Series tied, 3–3

Kiel Auditorium, St. Louis, Missouri
Attendance: 10,053
Referees: Sid Borgia, Arnie Heft

- Cliff Hagan hits the game-winning shot at the buzzer, which is believed to be the first buzzer-beater shot to win a playoff game in NBA history.

April 13

Boxscore

St. Louis Hawks 123, Boston Celtics 125 (2OT)
Scoring by quarter: 28–26, 25–25, 24–32, 26–20, Overtime: 10–10, 10–12
| Pts: Bob Pettit 39; Rebs: Bob Pettit 19; Asts: Martin, Coleman 7 each | Pts: Tom Heinsohn 37; Rebs: Bill Russell 32; Asts: Bob Cousy 11 |
Boston wins series, 4–3

Boston Garden, Boston, Massachusetts
Attendance: 13,909

- Bob Pettit hits the game-tying free throws with 7 seconds left in regulation to force the first OT; Jack Coleman makers the game-tying basket with 9 seconds left in the first OT to force the second OT. Bob Pettit misses the game-tying shot at the buzzer to force a third OT.
- Only NBA Finals Game 7 to date to go past the first overtime, and as of 2021, the only Game 7 in NBA history to go past the first overtime.

Celtics center Bill Russell set a rookie record for rebounds in a single NBA Finals game with 32 in game 7, and averaged an NBA Finals rookie record of 22.9 rebounds per game for the entire series.
