= List of 1956–57 NBA season transactions =

This is a list of all personnel changes for the 1956 NBA off-season and 1956–57 NBA season

== Events ==
=== July 23, 1956 ===
- The Rochester Royals signed Lew Hitch as a free agent.

=== August 31, 1956 ===
- The Boston Celtics claimed Andy Phillip on waivers from the Fort Wayne Pistons.

=== September 11, 1956 ===
- The St. Louis Hawks signed Irv Bemoras as a free agent.

=== October 3, 1956 ===
- The Syracuse Nationals sold Billy Kenville to the Fort Wayne Pistons.

=== October 23, 1956 ===
- The Syracuse Nationals sold Red Rocha to the Fort Wayne Pistons.

=== October 24, 1956 ===
- The Minneapolis Lakers sold Al Bianchi to the Syracuse Nationals.

=== October 26, 1956 ===
- The New York Knicks traded Walter Dukes and Burdette Haldorson to the Minneapolis Lakers for Jerry Bird, Phil Jordon and Slater Martin.

=== November 15, 1956 ===
- The Syracuse Nationals signed Larry Hennessy as a free agent.
- The Syracuse Nationals signed Bob Schafer as a free agent.
- The St. Louis Hawks claimed Odie Spears on waivers from the Fort Wayne Pistons.

=== November 29, 1956 ===
- The Boston Celtics sold Togo Palazzi to the Syracuse Nationals.

=== December 2, 1956 ===
- The St. Louis Hawks sold Bob Harrison to the Syracuse Nationals.

=== December 12, 1956 ===
- The St. Louis Hawks traded Willie Naulls to the New York Knicks for Slater Martin.
- The Fort Wayne Pistons released Alex Hannum.

=== December 17, 1956 ===
- The St. Louis Hawks signed Alex Hannum as a free agent.

=== January 4, 1957 ===
- The Rochester Royals sold Lew Hitch to the Philadelphia Warriors.

=== January 7, 1957 ===
- The St. Louis Hawks fired Red Holzman as head coach.

=== January 8, 1957 ===
- The St. Louis Hawks appointed Slater Martin as head coach.

=== January 21, 1957 ===
- The St. Louis Hawks hired Alex Hannum as head coach.

=== April 3, 1957 ===
- The New York Knicks traded Dick Atha, Nathaniel Clifton and Harry Gallatin to the Fort Wayne Pistons for Mel Hutchins and Charlie Tyra.
- The New York Knicks traded Dick McGuire to the Fort Wayne Pistons for a 1958 1st round draft pick (Mike Farmer was later selected).

=== April 17, 1957 ===
- The Minneapolis Lakers traded Clyde Lovellette and Jim Paxson to the Rochester Royals for Bob Burrow, Ed Fleming, Hot Rod Hundley, Monk Meineke and Art Spoelstra.

=== May 14, 1957 ===
- The Fort Wayne Pistons traded Corky Devlin to the Minneapolis Lakers for Ed Kalafat.

=== June 19, 1957 ===
- The Minneapolis Lakers reassigned Head Coach John Kundla.
- The Minneapolis Lakers hired George Mikan as head coach.

== Notes ==
- ^{a} Number of years played in the NBA prior to the draft
- ^{b} Career with the franchise that drafted the player
- ^{c} Never played a game for the franchise
