= 1957 NBA playoffs =

Postseason tournament

Tournament details
- Dates: March 14 – April 13, 1957
- Season: 1956–57
- Teams: 6

Final positions
- Champions: Boston Celtics (1st title)
- Runners-up: St. Louis Hawks
- Semifinalists: Minneapolis Lakers; Syracuse Nationals

Tournament statistics
- Scoring leader(s): Bob Pettit (Hawks) (29.8 PPG)

The 1957 NBA playoffs was the postseason tournament of the National Basketball Association's 1956–57 season. The tournament concluded with the Eastern Division champion Boston Celtics defeating the Western Division champion St. Louis Hawks 4 games to 3 in the NBA Finals.

It was the first title in Celtics history; as of 2026, they have won the most NBA titles with 18.

The Celtics and Hawks met in 4 out of 5 NBA Finals from 1957–1961, with the Celtics winning 3 out of 4. While the Hawks' dominance of the Western Division was succeeded by the Los Angeles Lakers afterward, Boston missed the NBA Finals just once between 1957–1969, and won the NBA title in every year but two.

In the division semifinals, the Philadelphia Warriors were swept by the Syracuse Nationals 2–0. This was the first time in NBA history that the defending champions were swept in the opening round. The next time the defending champions were swept in the opening round was in 2007. It was also the only time in which the playoff series leading to the Final resulted in sweeps.

== Bracket ==
Division Semifinals
E3	Philadelphia	0
E2	Syracuse	2
W3	Fort Wayne	0
W2	Minneapolis	2

Division Finals
Eastern Division
E1	Boston*	3
E2	Syracuse	0
Western Division
W1	St. Louis*	3
W2	Minneapolis	0

NBA Finals
E1	Boston*	4
W1	St. Louis*	3

- * Division winner
- Bold Series winner
- Italic Team with home-court advantage in NBA Finals

== Division Tiebreakers ==
=== Western Division Tiebreakers ===
==== Fort Wayne Pistons @ St. Louis Hawks ====
March 14

Boxscore

Fort Wayne Pistons 103, St. Louis Hawks 115
Scoring by quarter: 29–21, 18–45, 33–24, 23–25
Pts: George Yardley 26; Rebs: Hutchins, Foust 10 each	Pts: Jack McMahon 24; Rebs: Cliff Hagan 16
Fort Wayne finishes as the West's #3 seed

Kiel Auditorium, St. Louis, Missouri

==== Minneapolis Lakers @ St. Louis Hawks ====
March 16

Boxscore

Minneapolis Lakers 111, St. Louis Hawks 114 (OT)
Scoring by quarter: 19–22, 24–21, 29–27, 28–30, Overtime: 11–14
Pts: Clyde Lovellette 30; Rebs: Lovellette, Dukes 12 each	Pts: Cliff Hagan 28; Rebs: Bob Pettit 18
St. Louis finishes as the West's #1 seed, Minneapolis as the West's #2 seed

Kiel Auditorium, St. Louis, Missouri
Referees: Arnie Heft, Jim Duffy

== Division Semifinals ==
=== Eastern Division Semifinals ===
==== (2) Syracuse Nationals vs. (3) Philadelphia Warriors ====
March 16

Boxscore

Syracuse Nationals 103, Philadelphia Warriors 96
Scoring by quarter: 24–27, 24–21, 23–18, 32–30
Pts: Red Kerr 25; Rebs: Red Kerr 21; Asts: Dolph Schayes 6	Pts: Neil Johnston 25; Rebs: Neil Johnston 26; Asts: George Dempsey 8
Syracuse leads series, 1–0

Philadelphia Civic Center, Philadelphia, Pennsylvania

March 18

Boxscore

Philadelphia Warriors 80, Syracuse Nationals 91
Scoring by quarter: 17–20, 20–15, 16–23, 27–33
Pts: Joe Graboski 16; Rebs: Walt Davis 10; Asts: Neil Johnston 5	Pts: Red Kerr 22; Rebs: Dolph Schayes 20; Asts: Schayes, Conlin 4 each
Syracuse wins series, 2–0

Onondaga War Memorial, Syracuse, New York

This was the fifth playoff meeting between these two teams, with the 76ers/Nationals winning three of the first four meetings.

Previous playoff series
Philadelphia 76ers/ Syracuse Nationals leads 3–1 in all-time playoff series

1950

Philadelphia Warriors 0, Syracuse Nationals 2

1950 Eastern Division Semifinals

1951

Philadelphia Warriors 0, Syracuse Nationals 2

1951 Eastern Division Semifinals

1952

Philadelphia Warriors 1, Syracuse Nationals 2

1952 Eastern Division Semifinals

1956

Philadelphia Warriors 3, Syracuse Nationals 2

1956 Eastern Division Finals

=== Western Division Semifinals ===
==== (2) Minneapolis Lakers vs. (3) Fort Wayne Pistons ====
March 17

Boxscore

Fort Wayne Pistons 127, Minneapolis Lakers 131
Scoring by quarter: 32–41, 37–29, 28–37, 30–24
Pts: George Yardley 34	Pts: Clyde Lovellette 30
Minneapolis leads series, 1–0

Minneapolis Auditorium, Minneapolis, Minnesota

March 19

Boxscore

Minneapolis Lakers 110, Fort Wayne Pistons 108
Scoring by quarter: 25–28, 27–23, 30–24, 28–33
Pts: Slick Leonard 19	Pts: Larry Foust 30
Minneapolis wins series, 2–0

War Memorial Coliseum, Fort Wayne, Indiana

This was the fifth playoff meeting between these two teams, with the Lakers winning three of the first four meetings.

Previous playoff series
Minneapolis leads 3–1 in all-time playoff series

1950

Fort Wayne Pistons 0, Minneapolis Lakers 2

1950 Central Division Finals

1953

Fort Wayne Pistons 2, Minneapolis Lakers 3

1953 Western Division Finals

1954

Fort Wayne Pistons 0, Minneapolis Lakers 2

1954 Western Division Round Robin Semifinals

1955

Fort Wayne Pistons 3, Minneapolis Lakers 1

1955 Western Division Finals

== Division Finals ==
=== Eastern Division Finals ===
==== (1) Boston Celtics vs. (2) Syracuse Nationals ====
March 21

Boxscore

Syracuse Nationals 90, Boston Celtics 108
Scoring by quarter: 27–22, 17–31, 20–30, 26–25
Pts: Dolph Schayes 21; Rebs: Dolph Schayes 23	Pts: Frank Ramsey 20; Rebs: Bill Russell 31
Boston leads series, 1–0

Boston Garden, Boston, Massachusetts

March 23

Boxscore

Boston Celtics 120, Syracuse Nationals 105
Scoring by quarter: 31–26, 23–23, 26–27, 40–29
Pts: Tom Heinsohn 30; Rebs: Bill Russell 30	Pts: Dolph Schayes 31; Rebs: Dolph Schayes 15
Boston leads series, 2–0

Onondaga War Memorial, Syracuse, New York

March 24

Boxscore

Syracuse Nationals 80, Boston Celtics 83
Scoring by quarter: 19–23, 17–18, 23–22, 21–20
Pts: Dolph Schayes 22; Rebs: Dolph Schayes 17	Pts: Bill Sharman 23; Rebs: Bill Russell 23
Boston wins series, 3–0

Boston Garden, Boston, Massachusetts

This was the sixth playoff meeting between these two teams, with the Nationals winning four of the first five meetings.

Previous playoff series
Syracuse leads 4–1 in all-time playoff series

1953

Boston Celtics 2, Syracuse Nationals 0

1953 Eastern Division Semifinals

1954

Boston Celtics 0, Syracuse Nationals 2

1954 Eastern Division Round Robin Semifinals

1954

Boston Celtics 0, Syracuse Nationals 2

1954 Eastern Division Finals

1955

Boston Celtics 1, Syracuse Nationals 3

1955 Eastern Division Finals

1956

Boston Celtics 1, Syracuse Nationals 2

1956 Eastern Division Semifinals

=== Western Division Finals ===
==== (1) St. Louis Hawks vs. (2) Minneapolis Lakers ====
March 21

Boxscore

Minneapolis Lakers 109, St. Louis Hawks 118
Scoring by quarter: 23–30, 26–31, 37–27, 23–30
Pts: Vern Mikkelsen 24; Rebs: Clyde Lovellette 11; Asts: Slick Leonard 9	Pts: Slater Martin 24; Rebs: Bob Pettit 16; Asts: Jack McMahon 9
St. Louis leads series, 1–0

Kiel Auditorium, St. Louis, Missouri
Attendance: 6,028

March 24

Boxscore

Minneapolis Lakers 104, St. Louis Hawks 106
Scoring by quarter: 25–26, 24–25, 30–26, 25–29
Pts: Clyde Lovellette 33; Rebs: Walter Dukes 20	Pts: Bob Pettit 30; Rebs: Jack Coleman 15
St. Louis leads series, 2–0

Kiel Auditorium, St. Louis, Missouri
Attendance: 9,451
Referees: Sid Borgia, Lou Bonder

March 25

Boxscore

St. Louis Hawks 143, Minneapolis Lakers 135 (2OT)
Scoring by quarter: 21–23, 28–26, 27–32, 38–33, Overtime: 17–17, 12–4
Pts: Bob Pettit 35	Pts: Slick Leonard 42
St. Louis wins series, 3–0

Minneapolis Auditorium, Minneapolis, Minnesota

This was the second playoff meeting between these two teams, with the Hawks winning the first meeting.

Previous playoff series
St. Louis leads 1–0 in all-time playoff series

1956

St. Louis Hawks 2, Minneapolis Lakers 1

1956 Western Division Semifinals

== NBA Finals: (E1) Boston Celtics vs. (W1) St. Louis Hawks ==
March 30

Boxscore

St. Louis Hawks 125, Boston Celtics 123 (2OT)
Scoring by quarter: 31–21, 18–26, 22–27, 31–28, Overtime: 11–11, 12–10
Pts: Bob Pettit 37; Rebs: Bob Pettit 14	Pts: Bill Sharman 36; Rebs: Bill Russell 18
St. Louis leads series, 1–0

Boston Garden, Boston, Massachusetts
Attendance: 5,976

- Tom Heinsohn hits the game-tying lay-up with 6 seconds left in regulation to force the first OT; Bob Cousy hits the game-tying shot with 15 seconds left in the first OT to force the second OT.

March 31

Boxscore

St. Louis Hawks 99, Boston Celtics 119
Scoring by quarter: 21–31, 22–31, 27–32, 29–25
Pts: Ed Macauley 19; Rebs: Bob Pettit 13; Asts: Slick Leonard 4	Pts: Cousy, Ramsey 22 each Rebs: Bill Russell 25; Asts: Bob Cousy 7
Series tied, 1–1

Boston Garden, Boston, Massachusetts
Attendance: 13,909
Referees: Mendy Rudolph, Sid Borgia

April 6

Boxscore

Boston Celtics 98, St. Louis Hawks 100
Scoring by quarter: 19–19, 25–21, 28–29, 26–31
Pts: Bill Sharman 28; Rebs: Bill Russell 19; Asts: Bob Cousy 8	Pts: Bob Pettit 26; Rebs: Bob Pettit 28; Asts: three players 5 each
St. Louis leads series, 2–1

Kiel Auditorium, St. Louis, Missouri
Attendance: 10,048

- Bob Pettit hits the game-winner with 45 seconds left.

April 7

Boxscore

Boston Celtics 123, St. Louis Hawks 118
Scoring by quarter: 31–36, 35–17, 30–37, 27–28
Pts: Bob Cousy 31; Rebs: Bill Russell 20; Asts: Arnie Risen 9	Pts: Bob Pettit 33; Rebs: Bob Pettit 16; Asts: Martin, Hagan 6 each
Series tied, 2–2

Kiel Auditorium, St. Louis, Missouri
Attendance: 10,035
Referees: Sid Borgia, Arnie Heft

April 9

Boxscore

St. Louis Hawks 109, Boston Celtics 124
Scoring by quarter: 30–21, 30–38, 25–35, 24–30
Pts: Bob Pettit 33; Rebs: Bob Pettit 15; Asts: Med Park 6	Pts: Bill Sharman 32; Rebs: Bill Russell 23; Asts: Bob Cousy 19
Boston leads series, 3–2

Boston Garden, Boston, Massachusetts
Attendance: 13,909

April 11

Boxscore

Boston Celtics 94, St. Louis Hawks 96
Scoring by quarter: 23–22, 28–27, 27–28, 16–19
Pts: Tom Heinsohn 28; Rebs: Bill Russell 23	Pts: Bob Pettit 32; Rebs: Bob Pettit 23
Series tied, 3–3

Kiel Auditorium, St. Louis, Missouri
Attendance: 10,053
Referees: Sid Borgia, Arnie Heft

- Cliff Hagan hits the game-winning shot at the buzzer, which is believed to be the first buzzer-beater shot to win a playoff game in NBA history.

April 13

Boxscore

St. Louis Hawks 123, Boston Celtics 125 (2OT)
Scoring by quarter: 28–26, 25–25, 24–32, 26–20, Overtime: 10–10, 10–12
Pts: Bob Pettit 39; Rebs: Bob Pettit 19; Asts: Martin, Coleman 7 each	Pts: Tom Heinsohn 37; Rebs: Bill Russell 32; Asts: Bob Cousy 11
Boston wins series, 4–3

Boston Garden, Boston, Massachusetts
Attendance: 13,909

- Bob Pettit hits the game-tying free throws with 7 seconds left in regulation to force the first OT; Jack Coleman makers the game-tying basket with 9 seconds left in the first OT to force the second OT. Bob Pettit misses the game-tying shot at the buzzer to force a third OT.
- Only NBA Finals Game 7 to date to go past the first overtime, and as of 2021, the only Game 7 in NBA history to go past the first overtime.

This was the first playoff meeting between these two teams.
