= Bob Harrison (basketball) =

American basketball player (1927–2024)

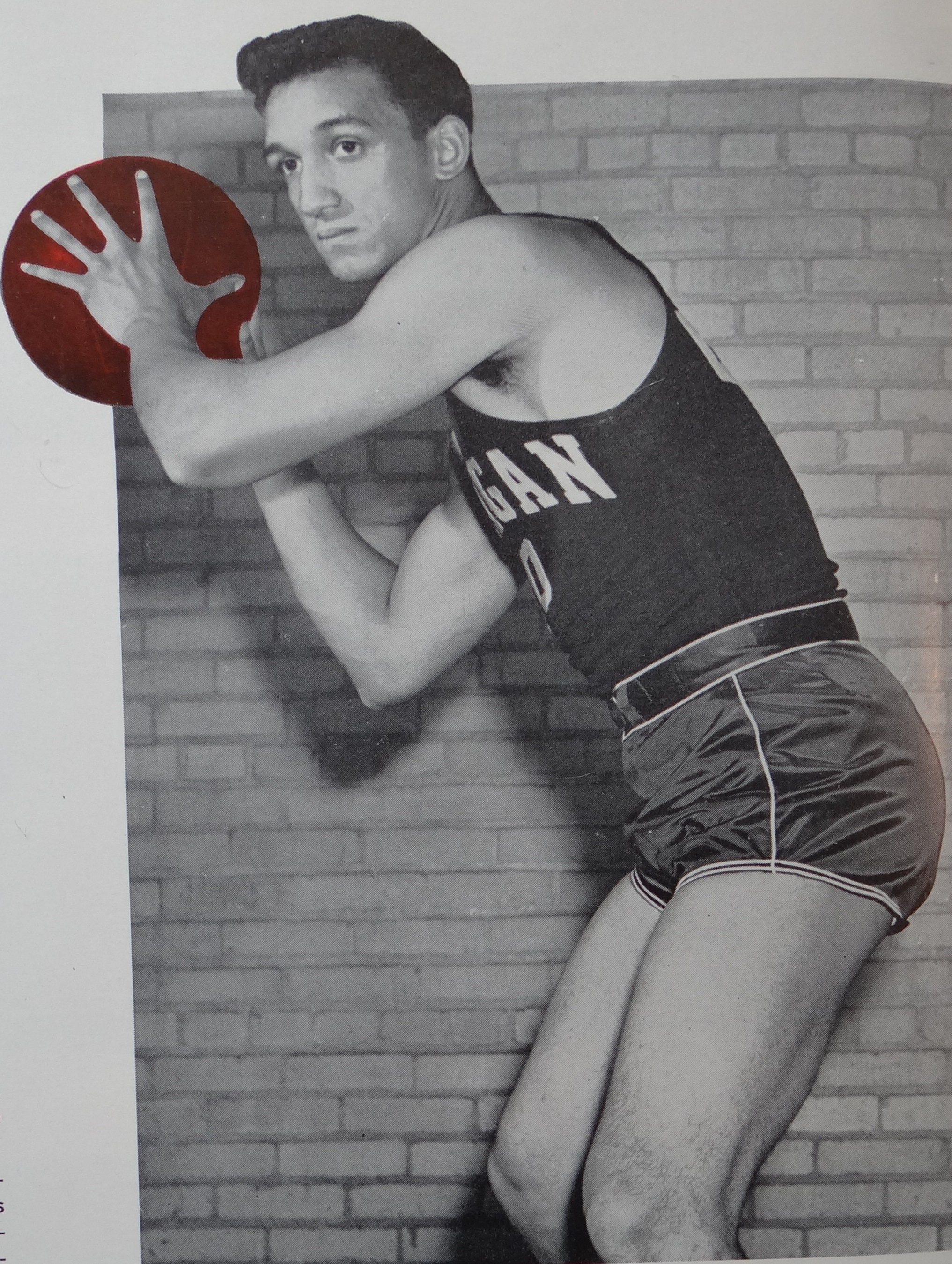
- Harrison from 1948 Michiganensian

Personal information
- Born: August 12, 1927 Toledo, Ohio, U.S.
- Died: March 3, 2024 (aged 96)
- Listed height: 6 ft 1 in (1.85 m)
- Listed weight: 190 lb (86 kg)

Career information
- High school: Woodward (Toledo, Ohio)
- College: Michigan (1945–1949)
- NBA draft: 1949: – round, –
- Drafted by: Minneapolis Lakers
- Playing career: 1949–1958
- Position: Point guard / shooting guard
- Number: 16, 7, 3
- Coaching career: 1958–1977

Career history

Playing
- 1949–1953: Minneapolis Lakers
- 1953–1956: Milwaukee / St. Louis Hawks
- 1956–1958: Syracuse Nationals

Coaching
- 1958–1968: Kenyon
- 1968–1973: Harvard
- 1976–1977: Syracuse Centennials

Career highlights
- 3× NBA champion (1950, 1952, 1953); NBA All-Star (1956)

Career statistics
- Points: 4,418 (7.2 ppg)
- Rebounds: 1,358 (2.5 rpg)
- Assists: 1,672 (2.7 apg)
- Stats at NBA.com
- Stats at Basketball Reference

Robert William Harrison (August 12, 1927 – March 3, 2024) was an American professional basketball player. A 6'1" guard from the University of Michigan, Harrison played nine seasons from 1949 to 1958 in the National Basketball Association (NBA) as a member of the Minneapolis Lakers, Milwaukee Hawks, St. Louis Hawks, and Syracuse Nationals. He averaged 7.2 points per game in his professional career and appeared in the 1956 NBA All-Star Game. Harrison coached the Syracuse Centennials during the 1976–77 Eastern Basketball Association season.

On February 3, 1941, as a 13-year-old 8th grader in Toledo, Ohio, Harrison scored all 139 points during his LaGrange School team's 139–8 win over Arch Street School. In the game, he made 69 field goals and one free throw.

Harrison later coached basketball at Kenyon College and Harvard University. He was the head coach of the Syracuse Centennials of the Eastern Basketball Association (EBA) during the 1976–77 season.

After the death of Bud Grant in 2023 he became the oldest living NBA champion. Harrison died on March 3, 2024, at the age of 96.

== NBA career statistics ==
Legend
GP	Games played	GS	Games started	MPG	Minutes per game
FG%	Field goal percentage	3P%	3-point field goal percentage	FT%	Free throw percentage
RPG	Rebounds per game	APG	Assists per game	SPG	Steals per game
BPG	Blocks per game	PPG	Points per game	**Bold**	Career high
†	Won an NBA championship

=== Regular season ===
Year	Team	GP	MPG	FG%	FT%	RPG	APG	PPG
1949–50†	Minneapolis	66	–	.359	.676	–	2.0	4.5
1950–51	Minneapolis	68	–	.347	.789	2.5	2.9	5.9
1951–52†	Minneapolis	65	26.3	.320	.718	2.5	2.9	6.2
1952–53†	Minneapolis	70	23.5	.376	.648	2.2	2.3	7.1
1953–54	Minneapolis	40	15.5	.298	.662	1.5	1.4	3.9
1953–54	Milwaukee	24	**34.3**	.336	.540	3.0	3.5	9.5
1954–55	Milwaukee	**72**	31.9	.342	.681	**3.1**	3.5	**10.1**
1955–56	St. Louis	72	30.8	.359	.664	2.7	**3.8**	8.6
1956–57	St. Louis/Syracuse	66	27.4	**.386**	.715	2.4	2.4	8.8
1957–58	Syracuse	**72**	25.0	.348	**.795**	2.3	2.3	7.2
Career		615	26.9	.352	.693	2.5	2.7	7.2
All-Star		1	25.0	.286	.500	0.0	1.0	5.0

=== Playoffs ===
Year	Team	GP	MPG	FG%	FT%	RPG	APG	PPG
1950†	Minneapolis	**12**	–	.432	.714	–	1.0	3.5
1951	Minneapolis	7	–	**.462**	.750	**3.9**	2.7	7.7
1952†	Minneapolis	**12**	19.6	.441	.824	1.7	2.0	6.2
1953†	Minneapolis	**12**	17.0	.385	.500	1.8	1.2	5.0
1956	St. Louis	8	**32.0**	.360	.632	3.0	**3.6**	**8.3**
1957	Syracuse	5	26.6	.267	**.889**	2.6	3.0	6.4
1958	Syracuse	3	14.3	.250	.667	2.3	1.7	3.3
Career		59	21.8	.385	.689	2.4	2.0	5.7

== See also ==
- List of basketball players who have scored 100 points in a single game
- University of Michigan Athletic Hall of Honor
