= Jim Loscutoff =

American basketball player (1930–2015)

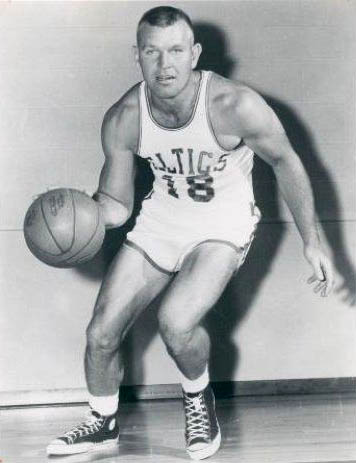

Personal information
- Born: February 4, 1930 San Francisco, California, U.S.
- Died: December 1, 2015 (aged 85) Naples, Florida, U.S.
- Listed height: 6 ft 5 in (1.96 m)
- Listed weight: 220 lb (100 kg)

Career information
- High school: Palo Alto (Palo Alto, California)
- College: Grant Tech (1948–1950); Oregon (1950–1951, 1954–1955)
- NBA draft: 1955: 1st round, 3rd overall pick
- Drafted by: Boston Celtics
- Playing career: 1955–1964
- Position: Small forward
- Number: 18

Career history

Playing
- 1955–1964: Boston Celtics

Career highlights
- As player: 7× NBA champion (1957, 1959–1964); "LOSCY" honored by Boston Celtics; First-team All-PCC (1955); California Mr. Basketball (1948)

Career statistics
- Points: 3,156 (6.2 ppg)
- Rebounds: 2,848 (5.6 rpg)
- Assists: 353 (0.7 apg)
- Stats at NBA.com
- Stats at Basketball Reference

James Loscutoff Jr. (February 4, 1930 – December 1, 2015) was a professional basketball player for the Boston Celtics of the National Basketball Association (NBA). A forward, Loscutoff played on seven Celtics championship teams between 1956 and 1964.

== Early life ==
Loscutoff was born in San Francisco, California, the son of Nellie George (Ramzoff) and James Loscutoff. His parents were Spiritual Christian Molokans from Russia. He starred in basketball at Palo Alto High School, graduating in 1948. Loscutoff then attended Grant Technical College, a two-year college near Sacramento, California, before proceeding to the University of Oregon. In his final season at Oregon, Loscutoff led the team in scoring and rebounding with 19.6 points per game and 17.2 rebounds per game. He still holds the Oregon school record for rebounds in a game, with 32.

== Professional career ==
The Celtics honored Loscutoff by having his nickname "Loscy" hang from the rafters.

Standing 6 feet 5 inches (1.96 m) tall, Loscutoff was selected with the third non-territorial pick of the first round in the 1955 NBA draft. He was originally drafted by coach Red Auerbach to provide some much-needed defensive nerve for the Celtics team, which (despite becoming the first team to average 100 points per game in the 1954–55 season) had one of the worst defensive records in the league.

During his rookie year, Loscutoff set a then-record for the Celtics with 26 rebounds in a game. In the 1957 NBA Finals, he sank the final two free throws of a 125–123 double-overtime victory over the St. Louis Hawks in game seven, as the Celtics won their first NBA championship. Loscutoff missed most of the 1957–58 season due to a knee injury, working closely with Auerbach on his rehabilitation. He successfully returned to the Celtics and was a member of six more championship teams.

In nine NBA seasons, from 1955–56 to 1963–64, Loscutoff was a member of seven championships as part of the legendary Celtics teams of the 1960s. A small forward, he was sometimes described as the Celtics hatchet man. His defense and strength were part of the defensive greatness of the 1960s Celtics, alongside Hall-of-Famer Bill Russell.

Loscutoff's nicknames included "Jungle Jim" and "Loscy". The organization wished to honor Loscutoff, but he asked that his jersey number (18) not be retired, so that a future Celtic could wear it. Instead, the Celtics added a banner with his nickname "Loscy" to the retired number banners hanging from the rafters of their arenas. The number was later retired in honor of another Celtic great, Dave Cowens.

== Coaching career ==
Loscutoff coached the basketball team at Boston State College from 1964 to 1976 and compiled a record of 219–92 with the Warriors.

In November 1980, he became the head coach of the New England Gulls of the Women's Professional Basketball League, the first women's pro basketball league in the United States. He coached the team for six games, all of which they lost, before being replaced by assistant coach Dana Skinner in early January 1981. Less than a month later, the Gulls folded due to financial difficulties.

== Personal life ==
Loscutoff lived in Florida and Andover, Massachusetts, where his family owns a day camp for children. His wife was artist Lynn Loscutoff. He died in Naples, Florida, on December 1, 2015, from complications of Parkinson's disease and pneumonia.

In 1980, he was a member of the inaugural class of inductees to the Oregon Sports Hall of Fame.

== NBA career statistics ==
Legend
GP	Games played	GS	Games started	MPG	Minutes per game
FG%	Field goal percentage	3P%	3-point field goal percentage	FT%	Free throw percentage
RPG	Rebounds per game	APG	Assists per game	SPG	Steals per game
BPG	Blocks per game	PPG	Points per game	**Bold**	Career high
†	Won an NBA championship

=== Regular season ===
Year	Team	GP	MPG	FG%	FT%	RPG	APG	PPG
1955–56	Boston	71	22.3	.360	.671	8.8	0.9	8.3
1956–57†	Boston	70	**31.7**	.345	.706	**10.4**	**1.3**	**10.6**
1957–58	Boston	5	11.2	.355	.333	4.0	0.2	4.6
1958–59†	Boston	66	25.5	.353	**.738**	7.0	0.9	8.3
1959–60†	Boston	28	19.1	.322	.611	3.9	0.4	5.5
1960–61†	Boston	76	15.2	.301	.645	3.8	0.3	4.4
1961–62†	Boston	**79**	14.5	.362	.536	4.2	0.6	5.3
1962–63†	Boston	63	9.6	**.375**	.524	2.5	0.4	3.3
1963–64†	Boston	53	8.5	.308	.581	2.5	0.5	2.5
Career		511	18.5	.345	.653	5.6	0.7	6.2

=== Playoffs ===
Year	Team	GP	MPG	FG%	FT%	RPG	APG	PPG
1955–56	Boston	3	**29.7**	.355	**.778**	**8.7**	**1.3**	**9.7**
1956–57†	Boston	10	25.9	.284	.643	8.3	0.5	8.0
1958–59†	Boston	11	23.6	.345	.524	6.6	1.2	8.1
1960–61†	Boston	10	11.6	.278	**.778**	3.5	0.3	3.7
1961–62†	Boston	**14**	15.1	.360	.400	4.2	0.4	4.7
1962–63†	Boston	9	6.2	.280	.500	2.3	0.1	1.7
1963–64†	Boston	1	5.0	**1.000**	–	2.0	0.0	4.0
Career		58	17.2	.324	.608	5.2	0.6	5.5

Note: Following the 1959–60 regular season, Loscutoff did not play in the 1960 postseason due to injury.
