= 1964–65 St. Louis Hawks season =

NBA professional basketball team season

- Head coach: Harry Gallatin; Richie Guerin
- Arena: Kiel Auditorium

Results
- Record: 45–35 (.563)
- Place: Division: 2nd (Western)
- Playoff finish: West Division Semifinals (Lost to Bullets 1–3)
- Stats at Basketball Reference

Local media
- Television: KPLR-TV
- Radio: KMOX

The 1964–65 St. Louis Hawks season was the Hawks' 16th season in the NBA and 10th season in St. Louis.

== Regular season ==
=== Season standings ===
Western Division	W	L	PCT	GB	Home	Road	Neutral	Div
x-Los Angeles Lakers	49	31	.613	–	25–13	21–16	3–2	25–15
x-St. Louis Hawks	45	35	.563	4	26–4	15–17	4–4	28–12
x-Baltimore Bullets	37	43	.463	12	23–14	12–19	2–10	22–18
Detroit Pistons	31	49	.388	18	13–17	11–20	7–12	18–22
San Francisco Warriors	17	63	.213	32	10–26	5–31	2–6	7–33

x – clinched playoff spot

=== Game log ===
1964–65 Game log
#	Date	Opponent	Score	High points	Record
1	October 17	Cincinnati	91–94	Cliff Hagan (23)	1–0
2	October 24	Philadelphia	86–126	Zelmo Beaty (23)	2–0
3	October 27	N Philadelphia	81–100	Bob Pettit (28)	2–1
4	October 28	Boston	119–117	Zelmo Beaty (30)	2–2
5	October 30	@ Cincinnati	118–119	Bob Pettit (34)	2–3
6	October 31	Detroit	99–107	Zelmo Beaty (27)	3–3
7	November 1	@ Los Angeles	116–115	Lenny Wilkens (26)	4–3
8	November 4	@ San Francisco	105–104	Bob Pettit (19)	5–3
9	November 7	Baltimore	99–134	Bob Pettit (25)	6–3
10	November 11	Cincinnati	118–116	Bob Pettit (32)	6–4
11	November 13	@ Cincinnati	106–123	Bob Pettit (29)	6–5
12	November 14	San Francisco	94–108	Bob Pettit (24)	7–5
13	November 17	Philadelphia	107–114	Bob Pettit (37)	8–5
14	November 18	@ Boston	97–100	Zelmo Beaty (20)	8–6
15	November 20	@ Philadelphia	118–115	Zelmo Beaty (31)	9–6
16	November 21	Detroit	94–100	Zelmo Beaty (21)	10–6
17	November 24	Baltimore	109–108	Zelmo Beaty (25)	10–7
18	November 26	Boston	98–110	Cliff Hagan (26)	11–7
19	November 28	@ New York	91–106	Cliff Hagan (16)	11–8
20	November 29	Philadelphia	97–94	Lenny Wilkens (28)	11–9
21	December 2	Los Angeles	102–105	Bob Pettit (23)	12–9
22	December 4	@ Baltimore	106–108	Bob Pettit (28)	12–10
23	December 6	New York	94–115	Zelmo Beaty (21)	13–10
24	December 8	@ San Francisco	113–93	Zelmo Beaty (24)	14–10
25	December 10	@ Los Angeles	95–91	Lenny Wilkens (30)	15–10
26	December 12	Cincinnati	115–109	Vaughn, Wilkens (25)	15–11
27	December 15	N Boston	109–124	Lenny Wilkens (23)	15–12
28	December 16	N New York	117–103	Zelmo Beaty (22)	16–12
29	December 18	@ Detroit	108–114	Lenny Wilkens (23)	16–13
30	December 19	Boston	115–105	Chico Vaughn (25)	16–14
31	December 25	@ Cincinnati	125–130 (OT)	Lenny Wilkens (36)	16–15
32	December 26	Boston	97–84	Lenny Wilkens (27)	16–16
33	December 27	@ New York	99–89	Lenny Wilkens (24)	17–16
34	December 29	San Francisco	104–122	Bob Pettit (26)	18–16
35	December 30	@ Detroit	125–120	Lenny Wilkens (29)	19–16
36	January 2	Los Angeles	115–112	Bob Pettit (28)	19–17
37	January 3	Los Angeles	99–92	Jeff Mullins (20)	19–18
38	January 5	N Detroit	109–108	Zelmo Beaty (24)	20–18
39	January 6	@ Boston	106–138	Chico Vaughn (29)	20–19
40	January 8	New York	82–83	Lenny Wilkens (16)	21–19
41	January 9	Philadelphia	104–102	Bob Pettit (27)	21–20
42	January 11	N Philadelphia	100–90	Lenny Wilkens (23)	22–20
43	January 16	N Baltimore	107–87	Lenny Wilkens (22)	23–20
44	January 17	Los Angeles	105–118	Bob Pettit (34)	24–20
45	January 19	@ Cincinnati	99–103	Bob Pettit (29)	24–21
46	January 22	Baltimore	117–110	Lenny Wilkens (23)	24–22
47	January 23	@ Baltimore	97–106	Bob Pettit (27)	24–23
48	January 24	@ Baltimore	106–114	Bob Pettit (23)	24–24
49	January 27	New York	100–117	Bob Pettit (29)	25–24
50	January 29	Baltimore	119–124	Zelmo Beaty (34)	26–24
51	January 30	@ Detroit	97–121	Bob Pettit (18)	26–25
52	January 31	Detroit	110–107	Bob Pettit (25)	26–26
53	February 2	N Philadelphia	105–119	Bob Pettit (30)	26–27
54	February 4	@ Philadelphia	119–123	Zelmo Beaty (33)	26–28
55	February 6	San Francisco	101–108	Bob Pettit (30)	27–28
56	February 7	San Francisco	103–126	Guerin, Pettit (23)	28–28
57	February 9	@ New York	108–103	Richie Guerin (27)	29–28
58	February 11	@ Baltimore	124–94	Paul Silas (22)	30–28
59	February 12	Baltimore	100–144	Chico Vaughn (19)	31–28
60	February 14	Cincinnati	99–92	Bob Pettit (24)	31–29
61	February 16	@ Cincinnati	103–111	Bill Bridges (24)	31–30
62	February 17	@ Boston	114–121	Zelmo Beaty (33)	31–31
63	February 18	N Boston	109–119	Cliff Hagan (25)	31–32
64	February 20	@ Detroit	110–98	Richie Guerin (23)	32–32
65	February 21	Detroit	107–112	Beaty, Hagan (21)	33–32
66	February 22	@ San Francisco	107–97	Richie Guerin (20)	34–32
67	February 24	@ San Francisco	111–103	Zelmo Beaty (26)	35–32
68	February 26	@ Los Angeles	90–106	Beaty, Wilkens (15)	35–33
69	February 28	Boston	108–102	Chico Vaughn (25)	35–34
70	March 2	@ New York	99–98	Chico Vaughn (29)	36–34
71	March 3	Philadelphia	110–124	Richie Guerin (33)	37–34
72	March 6	Los Angeles	107–109	Cliff Hagan (32)	38–34
73	March 7	New York	106–132	Cliff Hagan (25)	39–34
74	March 10	Cincinnati	113–137	Lenny Wilkens (23)	40–34
75	March 11	@ San Francisco	101–99	Cliff Hagan (28)	41–34
76	March 13	@ Los Angeles	101–106	Zelmo Beaty (20)	41–35
77	March 14	@ Los Angeles	115–108	Cliff Hagan (30)	42–35
78	March 17	San Francisco	94–101	Richie Guerin (16)	43–35
79	March 20	Detroit	98–107	Bob Pettit (18)	44–35
80	March 21	New York	103–112	Cliff Hagan (19)	45–35

== Playoffs ==
1965 playoff game log
Division Semifinals: 1–3 (home: 1–1; road: 0–2)

Game	Date	Team	Score	High points	High rebounds	High assists	Location Attendance	Series
1	March 24	Baltimore	L 105–108	Lenny Wilkens (25)	Bill Bridges (23)	Richie Guerin (6)	Kiel Auditorium; 5,320	0–1
2	March 26	Baltimore	W 129–105	Richie Guerin (28)	Zelmo Beaty (12)	Richie Guerin (10)	Kiel Auditorium; 7,628	1–1
3	March 27	@ Baltimore	L 99–131	Zelmo Beaty (18)	Zelmo Beaty (17)	four players tied (3)	Baltimore Civic Center; 6,358	1–2
4	March 30	@ Baltimore	L 103–109	Cliff Hagan (24)	Bill Bridges (20)	Lenny Wilkens (4)	Baltimore Civic Center; 6,423	1–3

1965 schedule

== Awards and records ==
- Bob Pettit, All-NBA Second Team
