= 1956–57 St. Louis Hawks season =

NBA professional basketball team season

- Division champions
- Head coach: Red Holzman, Slater Martin and Alex Hannum
- Arena: Kiel Auditorium

Results
- Record: 34–38 (.472)
- Place: Division: 1st (Western)
- Playoff finish: NBA Finals (lost to Celtics 3–4)
- Stats at Basketball Reference

The 1956–57 St. Louis Hawks season was the 11th season for the franchise, eighth in the National Basketball Association (NBA), and the second in St. Louis, Missouri. Prior to the start of the season, the Hawks made one of the biggest draft-day deals in NBA history. The Hawks sent 2nd overall pick Bill Russell to the Boston Celtics for Cliff Hagan and second-year star Ed Macauley. Macauley had been a popular player at St. Louis University. The Hawks struggled for most of the season and coach Red Holzman was fired midway through the season. The new head coach was Slater Martin, who led the Hawks to a 5–3 record. Martin did not want the added responsibility of head coach, so Alex Hannum took over for the rest of the season.

Despite a 34–38 record, the Hawks claimed the Western Division by a tiebreaker and earned a bye into the Western Finals, where the Hawks swept the Minneapolis Lakers in three straight games. The Hawks met the Boston Celtics in the NBA Finals. The Hawks won Game 1 in double overtime, 125–123 in Boston. The Celtics took Game 2 and the Hawks took Game 3 at home by 2 points. After losing Game 5 in Boston, the Hawks needed another victory at home to force a decisive seventh game. Game 7 in Boston went into double overtime and the Celtics emerged victorious, winning by 2 points.

== Offseason ==
=== NBA draft ===
Pick	Player	Position	School
2	Bill Russell	Center	San Francisco

== Roster ==
1956-57 St. Louis Hawks roster
Players

Pos.	No.	Player	Height	Weight	DOB	From
F	25	John Barber	6 ft 6 in (1.98 m)	210 lb (95 kg)	June 27, 1927	Cal State LA
SF	26	Irv Bemoras	6 ft 3 in (1.91 m)	185 lb (84 kg)	November 18, 1930	Illinois
PF	12	Jack Coleman	6 ft 7 in (2.01 m)	195 lb (88 kg)	May 23, 1924	Louisville
SF	6, 17	Cliff Hagan	6 ft 4 in (1.93 m)	210 lb (95 kg)	December 9, 1931	Kentucky
PF	33	Alex Hannum	6 ft 7 in (2.01 m)	210 lb (95 kg)	July 19, 1923	USC
G		Bob Harrison	6 ft 1 in (1.85 m)	190 lb (86 kg)	August 12, 1927	Michigan
PF	20, 50	Ed Macauley	6 ft 8 in (2.03 m)	185 lb (84 kg)	March 22, 1928	Saint Louis
PG	22	Slater Martin	5 ft 10 in (1.78 m)	170 lb (77 kg)	October 22, 1925	Texas
SG	21	Jack McMahon	6 ft 1 in (1.85 m)	185 lb (84 kg)	December 3, 1928	St. John's
F/C	33	Willie Naulls	6 ft 6 in (1.98 m)	225 lb (102 kg)	October 7, 1934	UCLA
SG	32	Med Park	6 ft 2 in (1.88 m)	205 lb (93 kg)	April 11, 1933	Missouri
C	9	Bob Pettit	6 ft 9 in (2.06 m)	205 lb (93 kg)	December 12, 1932	LSU
C	70	Chuck Share	6 ft 11 in (2.11 m)	235 lb (107 kg)	March 14, 1927	Bowling Green
SF	15	Odie Spears	6 ft 5 in (1.96 m)	205 lb (93 kg)	June 17, 1924	Western Kentucky
F	22	Norm Stewart	6 ft 5 in (1.96 m)	205 lb (93 kg)	January 20, 1935	Missouri

Coaches
Head coach
- Alex Hannum

Legend
- (DP) Unsigned draft pick
- (FA) Free agent
- (S) Suspended
- Injured

Roster

== Regular season ==
=== Season standings ===
Western Division	W	L	PCT	GB	Home	Road	Neutral	Div
x-St. Louis Hawks	34	38	.472	-	17-9	10-20	7-9	22-14
x-Minneapolis Lakers	34	38	.472	-	15-9	5-22	14-7	18-18
x-Fort Wayne Pistons	34	38	.472	-	23-5	5-23	6-10	17-19
Rochester Royals	31	41	.431	3	19-10	7-17	5-14	15-21

=== Game log ===
1956–57 Game log
#	Date	Opponent	Score	High points	Record
1	October 27	Minneapolis	W 97–75	Bob Pettit (25)	1–0
2	November 3	vs. Syracuse	L 73–75	Jack McMahon (21)	1–1
3	November 4	@ Syracuse	W 78–76	Ed Macauley (20)	2–1
4	November 7	New York	W 107–101	Bob Pettit (34)	3–1
5	November 10	Fort Wayne	W 86–79	Bob Pettit (27)	4–1
6	November 11	@ Fort Wayne	L 81–96	Bob Pettit (27)	4–2
7	November 13	Rochester	W 118–105	Bob Pettit (49)	5–2
8	November 17	Fort Wayne	W 92–87	Ed Macauley (23)	6–2
9	November 18	@ New York	L 69–102	Bob Pettit (13)	6–3
10	November 20	Syracuse	W 104–81	Bob Pettit (26)	7–3
11	November 21	@ Rochester	L 76–85	Bob Pettit (28)	7–4
12	November 24	Minneapolis	L 102–104 (OT)	Ed Macauley (27)	7–5
13	November 25	@ Minneapolis	W 95–94	Ed Macauley (26)	8–5
14	November 27	Boston	L 90–102	Bob Pettit (25)	8–6
15	December 1	Philadelphia	L 95–107	Bob Pettit (23)	8–7
16	December 4	vs. Boston	L 107–108	Bob Pettit (24)	8–8
17	December 6	vs. Minneapolis	L 96–103	Bob Pettit (17)	8–9
18	December 7	New York	L 101–107	Bob Pettit (22)	8–10
19	December 8	vs. New York	L 104–109	Bob Pettit (21)	8–11
20	December 11	@ New York	W 137–128	Bob Pettit (41)	9–11
21	December 12	@ Philadelphia	L 99–115	Jack Coleman (25)	9–12
22	December 15	@ Boston	L 99–102	Bob Pettit (31)	9–13
23	December 16	@ Syracuse	L 91–101	Bob Pettit (26)	9–14
24	December 18	vs. Fort Wayne	W 95–84	Bob Pettit (30)	10–14
25	December 22	@ Boston	L 93–95	Bob Pettit (28)	10–15
26	December 25	@ New York	W 107–105 (OT)	Bob Pettit (37)	11–15
27	December 27	Syracuse	W 102–95	Bob Pettit (39)	12–15
28	December 29	@ Minneapolis	W 95–92	Bob Pettit (22)	13–15
29	December 30	Minneapolis	W 100–93	Bob Pettit (41)	14–15
30	January 1	@ Rochester	L 101–102 (OT)	Bob Pettit (32)	14–16
31	January 3	vs. Philadelphia	L 81–82	Bob Pettit (26)	14–17
32	January 4	@ Philadelphia	92–96	Jack Coleman (21)	14–18
33	January 6	Rochester	L 86–93	Bob Pettit (33)	14–19
34	January 10	vs. New York	L 84–89 (OT)	Bob Pettit (38)	14–20
35	January 12	Boston	W 100–98	Bob Pettit (39)	15–20
36	January 13	@ Fort Wayne	L 89–91	Bob Pettit (28)	15–21
37	January 16	@ Rochester	W 108–106 (OT)	Bob Pettit (26)	16–21
38	January 17	vs. Fort Wayne	W 106–82	Slater Martin (22)	17–21
39	January 18	@ Boston	L 117–126	Bob Pettit (38)	17–22
40	January 19	@ Syracuse	W 104–96	Bob Pettit (30)	18–22
41	January 20	Philadelphia	W 104–102 (OT)	Bob Pettit (23)	19–22
42	January 22	@ Fort Wayne	L 87–97	Bob Pettit (30)	19–23
43	January 23	vs. Fort Wayne	W 101–78	Bob Pettit (22)	20–23
44	January 24	@ Philadelphia	L 96–107	Bob Pettit (30)	20–24
45	January 25	vs. Rochester	W 100–99	Bob Pettit (36)	21–24
46	January 27	Rochester	W 107–83	Bob Pettit (33)	22–24
47	January 29	Fort Wayne	L 85–91	Bob Pettit (26)	22–25
48	February 2	@ Minneapolis	W 106–97	Bob Pettit (37)	23–25
49	February 3	Minneapolis	W 102–85	Bob Pettit (31)	24–25
50	February 5	Philadelphia	L 87–101	Bob Pettit (26)	24–26
51	February 6	@ Rochester	L 100–103	Bob Pettit (24)	24–27
52	February 7	@ Syracuse	L 110–112	Bob Pettit (31)	24–28
53	February 8	@ Philadelphia	L 90–93	Bob Pettit (41)	24–29
54	February 10	Rochester	W 117–93	Bob Pettit (44)	25–29
55	February 11	vs. Syracuse	W 107–101	Bob Pettit (33)	26–29
56	February 12	vs. Minneapolis	L 105–110	Bob Pettit (35)	26–30
57	February 15	Boston	L 116–123 (2OT)	Bob Pettit (31)	26–31
58	February 17	@ Minneapolis	W 118–115 (OT)	Ed Macauley (36)	27–31
59	February 19	Fort Wayne	W 96–83	Ed Macauley (23)	28–31
60	February 21	@ Boston	L 112–125	Jack Coleman (33)	28–32
61	February 23	@ Rochester	L 86–101	Ed Macauley (21)	28–33
62	February 24	Philadelphia	W 113–112	Chuck Share (28)	29–33
63	February 25	vs. Minneapolis	W 110–94	Med Park (24)	30–33
64	February 26	@ New York	L 76–107	Jack Coleman (17)	30–34
65	February 27	vs. Syracuse	L 93–108	Ed Macauley (21)	30–35
66	March 2	New York	L 94–97	Cliff Hagan (19)	30–36
67	March 3	@ Fort Wayne	W 112–102	Jack McMahon (27)	31–36
68	March 5	Boston	W 104–102	Jack McMahon (21)	32–36
69	March 8	vs. Rochester	W 100–92	Ed Macauley (26)	33–36
70	March 9	Fort Wayne	W 97–96	Bob Pettit (23)	34–36
71	March 10	@ Minneapolis	L 104–117	Ed Macauley (17)	34–37
72	March 13	vs. Rochester	L 99–104	Ed Macauley (22)	34–38

== Playoffs ==
1957 playoff game log
Division Tiebreaker (finished as West's #1 seed)

Game	Date	Team	Score	High points	High rebounds	Location	Record
1	March 14	Fort Wayne	W 115–103	Jack McMahon (24)	Cliff Hagan (16)	Kiel Auditorium	1–0
2	March 16	Minneapolis	W 114–111 (OT)	Cliff Hagan (28)	Bob Pettit (18)	Kiel Auditorium	2–0

Division Finals: 3–0 (home: 2–0; road: 1–0)

Game	Date	Team	Score	High points	High rebounds	High assists	Location Attendance	Series
1	March 21	Minneapolis	W 118–109	Slater Martin (24)	Bob Pettit (16)	Jack McMahon (9)	Kiel Auditorium; 6,028	1–0
2	March 24	Minneapolis	W 106–104	Bob Pettit (30)	Jack Coleman (15)	—	Kiel Auditorium; 9,451	2–0
3	March 26	@ Minneapolis	W 143–135 (2OT)	Bob Pettit (35)	—	—	Minneapolis Auditorium	3–0

NBA Finals: 3–4 (home: 2–1; road: 1–3)

Game	Date	Team	Score	High points	High rebounds	High assists	Location Attendance	Series
1	March 30	@ Boston	W 125–123 (2OT)	Bob Pettit (37)	Bob Pettit (14)	—	Boston Garden; 5,976	1–0
2	March 31	@ Boston	L 99–119	Ed Macauley (19)	Bob Pettit (13)	Slick Leonard (4)	Boston Garden; 13,909	1–1
3	April 6	Boston	W 100–98	Bob Pettit (26)	Bob Pettit (28)	three player tied (5)	Kiel Auditorium; 10,048	2–1
4	April 7	Boston	L 118–123	Bob Pettit (33)	Bob Pettit (16)	Martin, Hagan (6)	Kiel Auditorium; 10,035	2–2
5	April 9	@ Boston	L 109–124	Bob Pettit (33)	Bob Pettit (15)	Med Park (6)	Boston Garden; 13,909	2–3
6	April 11	Boston	W 96–94	Bob Pettit (32)	Bob Pettit (23)	—	Kiel Auditorium; 10,053	3–3
7	April 13	@ Boston	L 123–125 (2OT)	Bob Pettit (39)	Bob Pettit (19)	Martin, Coleman (7)	Boston Garden; 13,909	3–4

1957 schedule

== Awards and honors ==
- Bob Pettit, All-NBA First Team
- Slater Martin, All-NBA Second Team
