= Med Park =

American basketball player

Personal information
- Born: April 11, 1933 Britton, South Dakota, U.S.
- Died: July 23, 1998 (aged 65) Springfield, Missouri, U.S.
- Listed height: 6 ft 2 in (1.88 m)
- Listed weight: 205 lb (93 kg)

Career information
- High school: Wentworth Military Academy (Lexington, Missouri)
- College: Missouri (1952–1955)
- NBA draft: 1955: undrafted
- Playing career: 1955–1960
- Position: Shooting guard / small forward
- Number: 11, 27, 32, 17, 14

Career history
- 1955–1958: St. Louis Hawks
- 1958–1960: Cincinnati Royals

Career highlights
- NBA champion (1958)
- Stats at NBA.com
- Stats at Basketball Reference

Medford R. Park (April 11, 1933 – July 23, 1998) was an American professional basketball player.

Park grew up in Lexington, Missouri. Park attended Wentworth Military Academy in Lexington from 1947 to 1951 and was a star athlete. He then went on to become an All-American basketball player for the University of Missouri. A 6'2" guard/forward, Park played five seasons (1955–1960) in the National Basketball Association as a member of the St. Louis Hawks and Cincinnati Royals. He averaged 6.1 points per game and won a league championship with St. Louis in 1958. He also played one season with the Washington Generals.

== Career statistics ==
Legend
GP	Games played	GS	Games started	MPG	Minutes per game
FG%	Field goal percentage	3P%	3-point field goal percentage	FT%	Free throw percentage
RPG	Rebounds per game	APG	Assists per game	SPG	Steals per game
BPG	Blocks per game	PPG	Points per game	**Bold**	Career high
†	Won an NBA championship	*	Led the league

=== NBA ===
==== Regular season ====
Year	Team	GP	MPG	FG%	FT%	RPG	APG	PPG
1955–56	St. Louis	40	10.6	.349	.6329	2.4	1.0	3.8
1956–57	St. Louis	66	17.1	.364	.740	3.0	1.4	5.2
1957–58†	St. Louis	71	15.5	.366	.728	2.6	1.1	5.4
1958–59	St. Louis	29	7.9	**.405**	.750	1.3	1.0	3.0
1958–59	Cincinnati	33	**27.2**	.401	**.770**	**4.5**	2.4	**9.7**
1959–60	Cincinnati	**74**	25.0	.388	.727	4.1	**2.9**	8.7
Career		313	18.0	.379	.628	3.1	1.7	6.1

==== Playoffs ====
Year	Team	GP	MPG	FG%	FT%	RPG	APG	PPG
1956	St. Louis	6	14.7	.233	**.727**	2.8	**1.8**	**6.3**
1957	St. Louis	**10***	**18.3**	.286	**.727**	**3.3**	1.2	4.4
1958†	St. Louis	**10**	14.7	**.407**	.591	2.4	1.2	4.7
Career		26	16.1	.314	.688	2.8	1.3	5.0
