= Slater Martin =

American basketball player and coach (1925–2012)

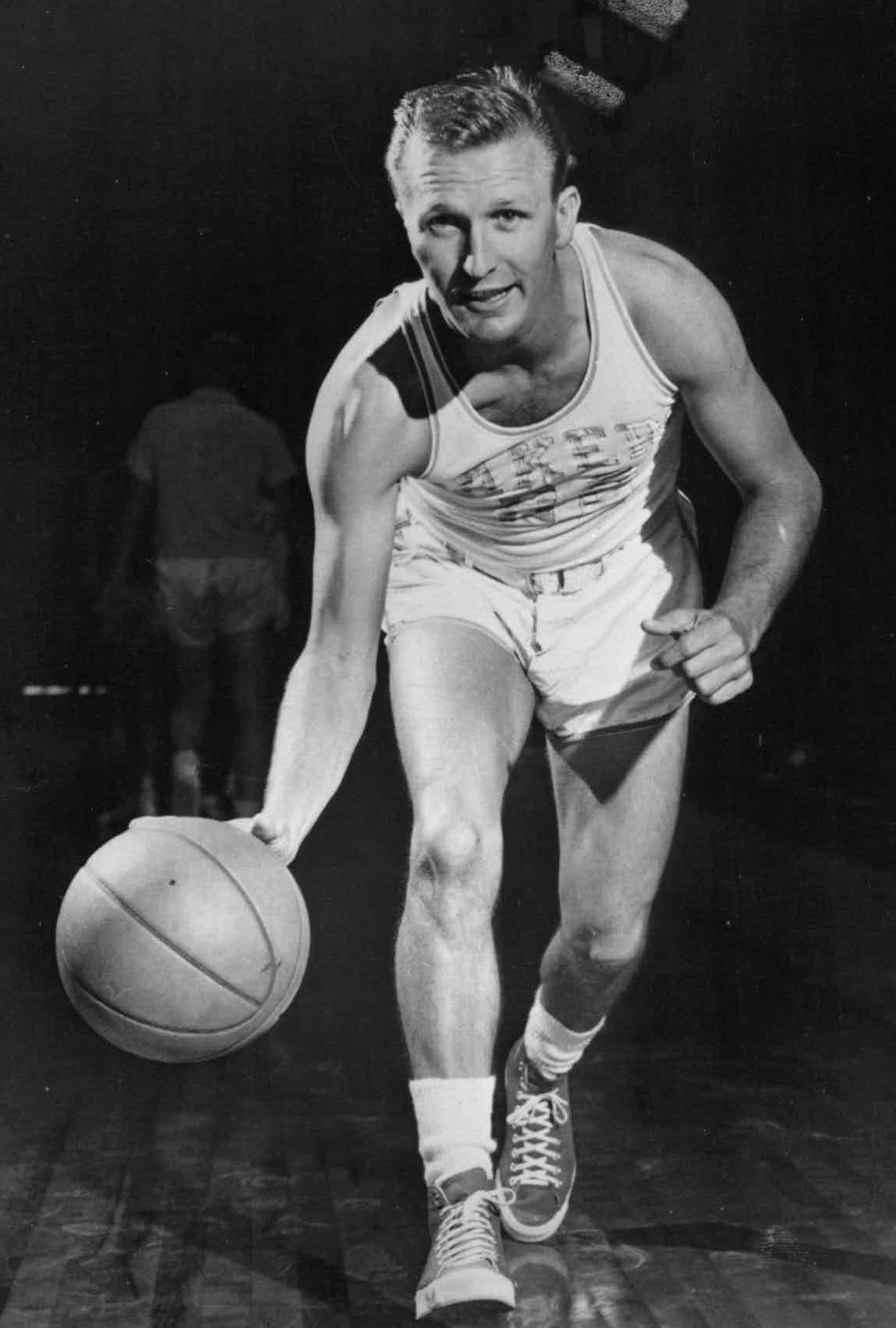

Personal information
- Born: October 22, 1925 Elmina, Texas, U.S.
- Died: October 18, 2012 (aged 86) Houston, Texas, U.S.
- Listed height: 5 ft 10 in (1.78 m)
- Listed weight: 170 lb (77 kg)

Career information
- High school: Jefferson Davis (Houston, Texas)
- College: Texas (1943–1944, 1946–1949)
- BAA draft: 1949: 3rd round
- Drafted by: Minneapolis Lakers
- Playing career: 1949–1960
- Position: Point guard
- Number: 22, 7

Career history

Playing
- 1949–1956: Minneapolis Lakers
- 1956: New York Knicks
- 1956–1960: St. Louis Hawks

Career highlights
- 5× NBA champion (1950, 1952–1954, 1958); 7× NBA All-Star (1953–1959); 5× All-NBA Second Team (1955–1959); No. 22 honored by Los Angeles Lakers; Second-team All-American – Look (1949); Third-team All-American – Helms (1948); No. 15 retired by Texas Longhorns

Career statistics
- Points: 7,337 (9.8 ppg)
- Rebounds: 2,302 (3.4 rpg)
- Assists: 3,160 (4.2 apg)
- Stats at NBA.com
- Stats at Basketball Reference
- Basketball Hall of Fame
- Collegiate Basketball Hall of Fame

Slater Nelson "Dugie" Martin Jr. (October 22, 1925 – October 18, 2012) was an American professional basketball player and coach who was a playmaking guard for 11 seasons in the National Basketball Association (NBA). A seven-time NBA All-Star, he won five championships. He is a member of the Naismith Memorial Basketball Hall of Fame.

== Early life ==
Martin was born on October 22, 1925, in Elmina, Walker County, Texas. Martin's father gave him the nickname "Dugan" early in life, after a character in the Maggie and Jiggs comic strip; and Martin did not realize his name was actually Slater for years. The nickname became "Dugie" when he went to Minneapolis to play for the Lakers.

Martin's grandmother got him interested in playing basketball at a young age, and made great efforts to support his development as a basketball player. She learned the subtleties of the game, and would conduct review sessions with Martin after his high school games. Martin was an alumnus of Jefferson Davis High School (now Northside High School) in Houston, where he led his school to two state basketball championships in 1942 and 1943, at 5 ft 7 in (1.7 m) and 130 pounds (59 kg). Martin won All-State honors as a player both years as well.

== College and Naval service ==
In 1943, Martin tried out for and made the basketball team at the University of Texas at Austin (UT), but left after either four or 14 freshman games to join the United States Navy during World War II, serving in the Pacific theater of war. Martin returned to UT in 1946, also having grown to 5 ft 10 in (1.78 m). He was also a married man when he attended college.

He averaged 9.4 points per game as a sophomore guard during the 1946-47 season, in which UT won the Southwest Conference (SWC) title with a 12–0 conference record and 26–2 overall record. Texas defeated Wyoming in the first round of the 1947 NCAA tournament, but then lost to Oklahoma. UT then defeated City College of New York to take third place in the tournament, which only consisted of eight teams at the time.

He averaged 12.7 points per game as a junior the following season. Texas played in the National Invitation Tournament (NIT) in 1948. As a senior, he led the Southwest Conference in scoring at 16 points per game, 3.1 points per game better than the runner-up. Martin set a UT and Southwest Conference scoring record in 1949 with 49 points in a game for the Longhorns against Texas Christian University (TCU).

Martin and backcourt teammates Al Madsen (5 ft 10 in) and Roy Cox (5 ft 8 in) were known as the "Mighty Mice". Throughout his career with the Longhorns, he averaged 12.7 points per game. At the time he graduated, he held the school's scoring record.

In 1948, as a junior, Slater was named a third-team All-American by both the Helms Athletic Foundation and True Magazine. Martin was named a 1949 Helms Athletic Foundation first-team All-American team as a senior, and second-team All-American by Look Magazine. He was All-SWC as a junior and senior. Opposing coach Bill Henderson of the Baylor Bears said of Martin, "'He was a great team man, a leader, a shooter, a passer, a great ball hawk .... And he was a great influence on others. He was dedicated to basketball, and unhesitatingly helped others.'"

His former high school now holds an annual fund raiser in his name, the "Slater Martin Golf Tournament", which successfully raises tens of thousands of dollars each year for high school student clubs and athletic teams.

== Professional career ==
Martin was one of the NBA's best defensive players in the 1950s, even though at times he was the shortest player in the league, typically assigned to guard the other team's best guard. The Naismith Hall of Fame describes Martin as a forerunner of the modern point guard. His focus was on running the offense and playing defense, rather than being a scorer.

He was the one defender who posed a problem to Boston Celtics' Hall of Fame guard Bob Cousy, who had to call for picks from teammates to get free of Martin's tight defense. Cousy also was known for flamboyant play, including dribbling behind his back. After dribbling behind his back against Martin, Martin "'told [Cousy] that if he did that again that I would break his nose. He didn’t do it again.'"

=== Minneapolis Lakers ===
On March 21, 1949, Martin was selected in the third round of the 1949 Basketball Association of America (BAA) draft by the Minneapolis Lakers. On August 3, 1949, the BAA merged with the National Basketball League (NBL) to form the NBA.

From 1949-56, Martin played for the George Mikan-led Minneapolis Lakers that won four NBA championships between 1950 and 1954. Mikan was the tallest player in the NBA and Martin the shortest. When Mikan first saw the 5 ft 10 in Martin, he thought Martin was a ballboy. The Naismith Hall of Fame said of Martin, "He was a steadying influence on five NBA championship teams, melding the NBA's first great frontcourt of Hall of Famers Jim Pollard, George Mikan, and Vern Mikkelsen into a cohesive unit." Martin played under Naismith Hall of Fame head coach John Kundla during Martin's entire Lakers career. Among Martin's Lakers teammates on the first two championship teams was future Pro Football Hall of Fame Minnesota Viking head coach Bud Grant.

He had a 311 consecutive game playing streak for the Lakers, missing only four games in seven years. After the 1950 championship victory over the Syracuse Nationals, the Lakers team immediately began a 20-game barnstorming tour, except the married Martin who returned to Texas. He was an All-Star four consecutive years for the Lakers, from 1952-53 to 1955-56, and was second-team All-NBA in 1954-55 and 1955-56. However, Martin and the Lakers had difficulty agreeing on his annual salary, and he held out each season he was with the Lakers.

=== St. Louis Hawks ===
On October 26, 1956, the Lakers traded Martin, Phil Jordon, and Jerry Bird to the New York Knicks for Walter Dukes and Burdette Haldorson. Martin played only 13 games with the Knicks before being traded to the St. Louis Hawks on December 12, 1956 for Willie Naulls, joining a Hawks' team led by future Hall of Fame forward Bob Pettit.

The Hawks finished first in the Western division, swept the Lakers 3–0 in the Western Division Finals, but ultimately lost to the Boston Celtics four games to three in the 1957 NBA finals. Martin averaged 14.7 points, 4.1 assists, 3.9 rebounds in 44.1 minutes per game during the finals (second only to Pettit in minutes played for the Hawks). Martin was selected as a starting guard in the January 1957 All-Star Game, and was named second-team All-NBA for the 1956-57 season.

In 1958, Martin won another NBA title, with the Hawks, defeating the Celtics four games to two. This Hawks team was the only team to win an NBA championship during the 10-season period from 1956-57 through 1965-66 other than the Boston Celtics. During the 1958 finals, Martin averaged 41.3 minutes per game, with 12.2 points, 4.2 assists and 3.3 rebounds per game. Martin was again second team All-NBA, and a starter on the Western Division All-Star team, with eight assists in 26 minutes of play.

Martin was an All-Star and second-team All-NBA again in the 1958-59 season. Martin was injured in the first game of the 1959 Western Division Finals between the Hawks and the Lakers in a collision with Laker Ed Fleming, which the Hawks claimed involved Fleming using football-like tactics in tripping Martin and hitting him with an elbow. Kundla, still coaching the Lakers, said he never ordered his players to use roughhouse tactics, the collision and injury were unintentional, and that he had coached Slater for years and Slater was "one of the finest guys I know". Martin did not play in the remainder of the series to the Hawks' detriment, losing the series two games to four. Hawks' coach Ed Macauley would not use Martin's injury as an excuse for the loss.

Martin finished his career in 1960 with the Hawks, and was team captain. The Hawks defeated the Lakers 4–3 in the 1960 Western Division Finals (the Lakers last year in Minneapolis), but lost the 1960 NBA Finals to the Celtics in seven games. Martin was injured and only played three games against the Lakers, and did not play any games in the NBA finals against the Celtics. His final NBA game came in Game 5 against the Minneapolis Lakers on March 22, 1960. At the time Martin retired, he was the oldest and smallest player in the NBA, and the last active player from the Lakers championship teams of the early 1950s.

=== Career ===
Martin was the first NBA player to be on five championship teams. Over his career, Martin scored 7,337 points in 745 games (9.8 points per game), with 3,160 career assists and 2,302 rebounds. He was in the NBA top 10 players in assists six times.

== Coaching ==
During his playing career, Martin was expecting to become a head coach eventually. After going to the Hawks in December 1956, Hawks' head coach Red Holzman was fired on January 7, 1957. The team wanted Martin to replace Holzman, serving as a player-coach. Martin, however, did not want to be both coach and player, and delegated coaching authority to his teammate and roommate Alex Hannum, soon giving up the player-coach role fully to Hannum, after leading the team to a 5–3 record during his abbreviated eight game stint as head coach. Both Hannum and Holzman became Hall of Fame coaches.

Martin had an opportunity to coach in Detroit after retiring, but decided to go home to Texas instead. He was head coach of the Houston Mavericks of the American Basketball Association in the 1967–68 season and part of 1968–69, and led the Mavericks into the 1968 ABA Playoffs.

== Legacy and honors ==
Martin was inducted into the Naismith Memorial Basketball Hall of Fame on May 3, 1982, in Springfield, Massachusetts. He is the only Longhorn to be so honored. His jersey number 15 was retired by the University of Texas on January 31, 2009, making him only the second Longhorn basketball player (after T. J. Ford) up to that time to have his number retired. Future All-NBA forward Kevin Durant’s number was retired soon after Martin's, after playing only one year for UT.

In 1964, he was inducted into the Texas Sports Hall of Fame. He was included in the University of Texas Longhorn's Hall of Honor in 1962.

== Death ==
He died of a brief illness on October 18, 2012, in Houston, Texas, aged 86.

== NBA career statistics ==
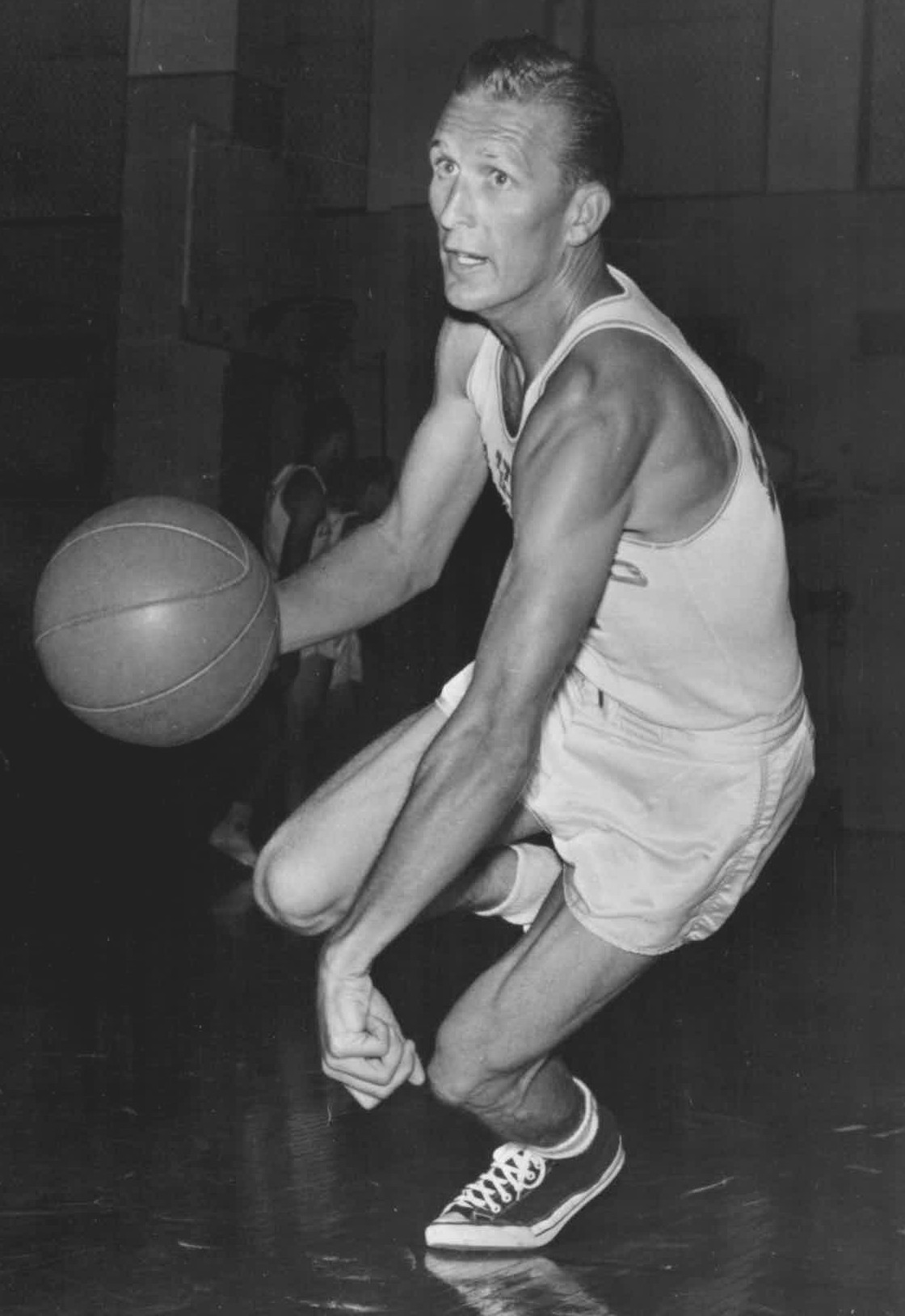
Martin, circa 1953–54

Legend
GP	Games played	GS	Games started	MPG	Minutes per game
FG%	Field goal percentage	3P%	3-point field goal percentage	FT%	Free throw percentage
RPG	Rebounds per game	APG	Assists per game	SPG	Steals per game
BPG	Blocks per game	PPG	Points per game	**Bold**	Career high
†	Won an NBA championship

=== Regular season ===
Year	Team	GP	MPG	FG%	FT%	RPG	APG	PPG
1949–50†	Minneapolis	67	–	.351	.634	–	2.2	4.0
1950–51	Minneapolis	68	–	.362	.684	3.6	3.5	8.5
1951–52†	Minneapolis	66	37.6	.375	.747	3.5	3.8	9.3
1952–53†	Minneapolis	70	36.5	**.410**	.780	2.7	3.6	10.6
1953–54†	Minneapolis	69	35.8	.388	.724	2.4	2.9	9.9
1954–55	Minneapolis	**72**	38.7	.381	.769	3.6	5.9	**13.6**
1955–56	Minneapolis	**72**	**39.4**	.358	**.833**	3.6	**6.2**	13.2
1956–57	New York	13	32.8	.344	.830	3.2	3.0	8.5
1956–57	St. Louis	53	37.3	.330	.782	**4.6**	4.3	11.5
1957–58†	St. Louis	60	35.0	.336	.746	3.8	3.6	12.0
1958–59	St. Louis	71	35.3	.347	.776	3.6	4.7	9.7
1959–60	St. Louis	64	27.4	.371	.726	2.9	5.2	6.2
Career		745	35.9	.364	.762	3.4	4.2	9.8

=== Playoffs ===
Year	Team	GP	MPG	FG%	FT%	RPG	APG	PPG
1950†	Minneapolis	12	–	.420	.583	–	2.1	4.7
1951	Minneapolis	7	–	.353	.519	**6.0**	3.6	7.1
1952†	Minneapolis	**13**	40.2	.345	.732	2.8	4.3	9.0
1953†	Minneapolis	12	37.8	.398	.765	2.6	3.6	10.1
1954†	Minneapolis	**13**	41.0	.330	.743	2.2	4.6	9.7
1955	Minneapolis	7	**45.0**	.298	.816	4.0	4.4	13.7
1956	Minneapolis	3	40.3	.459	**.833**	2.3	**5.0**	**18.0**
1957	St. Louis	10	43.9	.355	.757	4.2	4.9	16.6
1958†	St. Louis	11	37.8	.321	.619	4.4	3.6	11.5
1959	St. Louis	1	18.0	**.800**	–	3.0	2.0	8.0
1960	St. Louis	3	19.3	.077	.250	1.0	2.7	1.0
Career		92	39.4	.351	.715	3.4	3.8	10.0

== Head coaching record ==
=== NBA ===
Team	Year	G	W	L	W–L%	Finish	PG	PW	PL	PW–L%	Result
St. Louis	1956–57	8	5	3	.625		—	—	—	—	
Career		8	5	3	.625		0	0	0	–	

== See also ==
- List of NBA players with most championships

Preceded by Initial coach	Houston Mavericks Head Coach; 1967–1968	Succeeded by Jim Weaver
