= 1956–57 Syracuse Nationals season =

Season for the Nationals in the National Basketball Association

- Head coach: Al Cervi; Paul Seymour
- Arena: Onondaga War Memorial

Results
- Record: 38–34 (.528)
- Place: Division: 2nd (Eastern)
- Playoff finish: East Division Finals (eliminated 0–3)
- Stats at Basketball Reference

The 1956–57 Syracuse Nationals season was the Nationals' 8th season in the NBA.

== Roster ==
1956-57 Syracuse Nationals roster
Players

Pos.	No.	Player	Height	Weight	DOB	From
G	6	Forest Able	6 ft 3 in (1.91 m)	180 lb (82 kg)	1932-07-27	Western Kentucky
PG	16	Al Bianchi	6 ft 3 in (1.91 m)	185 lb (84 kg)	1932-03-26	Bowling Green
SG	8	Ed Conlin	6 ft 5 in (1.96 m)	200 lb (91 kg)	1933-09-02	Fordham
SG	3	Bob Harrison	6 ft 1 in (1.85 m)	190 lb (86 kg)	1927-08-12	Michigan
SG	15	Larry Hennessy	6 ft 3 in (1.91 m)	185 lb (84 kg)	1929-05-20	Villanova
SF	12	Joe Holup	6 ft 6 in (1.98 m)	215 lb (98 kg)	1934-02-26	George Washington
C	9	Bob Hopkins	6 ft 8 in (2.03 m)	205 lb (93 kg)	1934-11-03	Grambling State
C	10	Red Kerr	6 ft 9 in (2.06 m)	230 lb (104 kg)	1932-07-17	Illinois
SF	11	Earl Lloyd	6 ft 5 in (1.96 m)	200 lb (91 kg)	1928-04-03	West Virginia State
SF	6	Togo Palazzi	6 ft 4 in (1.93 m)	205 lb (93 kg)	1932-08-08	Holy Cross
G	3	Jim Ray	6 ft 1 in (1.85 m)	180 lb (82 kg)	1934-01-12	Toledo
G/F	15	Don Savage	6 ft 3 in (1.91 m)	205 lb (93 kg)	1928-04-09	Le Moyne
SG	3	Bob Schafer	6 ft 3 in (1.91 m)	195 lb (88 kg)	1933-03-29	Villanova
PF	4	Dolph Schayes	6 ft 8 in (2.03 m)	220 lb (100 kg)	1928-05-19	NYU
PG	5	Paul Seymour	6 ft 1 in (1.85 m)	180 lb (82 kg)	1928-01-30	Toledo
PF	17	Jim Tucker	6 ft 7 in (2.01 m)	185 lb (84 kg)	1932-12-11	Duquesne

Coaches
Head coach

Paul Seymour

Legend
- (DP) Unsigned draft pick
- (FA) Free agent
- (S) Suspended
- Injured

Roster

== Regular season ==
=== Season standings ===
Eastern Division	W	L	PCT	GB	Home	Road	Neutral	Div
x-Boston Celtics	44	28	.611	-	24-4	11-18	9-6	20-16
x-Syracuse Nationals	38	34	.528	6	23-9	9-15	6-10	20-16
x-Philadelphia Warriors	37	35	.514	7	20-5	5–25	12-5	17-19
New York Knicks	36	36	.500	8	18-10	9-19	9-7	15-21

x – clinched playoff spot

=== Game log ===
1956–57 Game log
#	Date	Opponent	Score	High points	Record
1	October 27	vs. Philadelphia	W 109–103 (2OT)	Dolph Schayes (33)	1–0
2	October 28	Rochester	W 91–75	Dolph Schayes (20)	2–0
3	November 3	vs. St. Louis	W 75–73	Conlin, Schayes (20)	3–0
4	November 4	St. Louis	L 76–78	Dolph Schayes (28)	3–1
5	November 10	@ Rochester	L 76–90	Ed Conlin (19)	3–2
6	November 11	Boston	L 83–94	Ed Conlin (22)	3–3
7	November 15	Minneapolis	103–96	Dolph Schayes (21)	3–4
8	November 17	N Philadelphia	96–109	Dolph Schayes (19)	3–5
9	November 18	Philadelphia	97–99	Dolph Schayes (31)	4–5
10	November 20	@ St. Louis	81–104	Dolph Schayes (28)	4–6
11	November 22	@ Minneapolis	78–111	Kerr, Schayes (13)	4–7
12	November 24	@ Boston	99–114	Ed Conlin (24)	4–8
13	November 27	N Rochester	82–90	Dolph Schayes (19)	4–9
14	November 29	Fort Wayne	92–87	Dolph Schayes (30)	4–10
15	December 1	@ New York	100–117	Dolph Schayes (21)	4–11
16	December 2	New York	100–110	Ed Conlin (28)	5–11
17	December 4	N Fort Wayne	97–96 (OT)	Dolph Schayes (22)	6–11
18	December 6	@ Fort Wayne	92–104	Ed Conlin (15)	6–12
19	December 7	N Fort Wayne	97–105	Ed Conlin (21)	6–13
20	December 9	Boston	110–116	Dolph Schayes (42)	7–13
21	December 15	Philadelphia	117–108	Bianchi, Conlin, Schayes (16)	7–14
22	December 16	St. Louis	91–101	Dolph Schayes (22)	8–14
23	December 23	Minneapolis	97–107	Dolph Schayes (27)	9–14
24	December 25	@ Rochester	93–98	Dolph Schayes (19)	9–15
25	December 27	@ St. Louis	95–102	Dolph Schayes (29)	9–16
26	December 29	@ Philadelphia	104–103 (OT)	Dolph Schayes (32)	10–16
27	December 30	@ Boston	92–105	Dolph Schayes (20)	10–17
28	January 1	New York	102–106	Dolph Schayes (30)	11–17
29	January 3	@ New York	111–126	Togo Palazzi (26)	11–18
30	January 4	N Boston	116–106	Bob Harrison (23)	12–18
31	January 6	Philadelphia	123–128	Johnny Kerr (26)	13–18
32	January 9	N Minneapolis	86–93	Dolph Schayes (17)	13–19
33	January 10	Minneapolis	118–110	Dolph Schayes (40)	13–20
34	January 12	@ Rochester	97–88	Dolph Schayes (31)	14–20
35	January 13	Rochester	85–91	Dolph Schayes (23)	15–20
36	January 17	@ Philadelphia	108–103	Dolph Schayes (30)	16–20
37	January 18	N Philadelphia	94–96	Dolph Schayes (21)	16–21
38	January 19	St. Louis	104–96	Dolph Schayes (29)	16–22
39	January 20	Fort Wayne	98–101	Dolph Schayes (19)	17–22
40	January 22	@ New York	88–90	Ed Conlin (26)	17–23
41	January 23	@ Boston	108–140	Togo Palazzi (25)	17–24
42	January 24	New York	97–115	Johnny Kerr (26)	18–24
43	January 26	@ Rochester	99–95	Dolph Schayes (26)	19–24
44	January 27	Minneapolis	93–94	Dolph Schayes (26)	20–24
45	January 28	N Minneapolis	112–96	Johnny Kerr (26)	21–24
46	January 30	@ Boston	119–116	Dolph Schayes (24)	22–24
47	January 31	Boston	104–105	Dolph Schayes (34)	23–24
48	February 2	@ Philadelphia	100–107	Dolph Schayes (19)	23–25
49	February 3	Fort Wayne	95–104	Ed Conlin (23)	24–25
50	February 5	N Boston	101–105	Dolph Schayes (21)	24–26
51	February 6	N New York	100–119	Paul Seymour (23)	24–27
52	February 7	St. Louis	110–112	Dolph Schayes (29)	25–27
53	February 9	@ New York	101–89	Kerr, Lloyd (21)	26–27
54	February 10	New York	100–102	Dolph Schayes (30)	27–27
55	February 11	N St. Louis	101–107	Johnny Kerr (20)	27–28
56	February 14	Rochester	104–95	Ed Conlin (19)	27–29
57	February 17	Boston	106–116	Dolph Schayes (28)	28–29
58	February 21	Philadelphia	86–92	Dolph Schayes (16)	29–29
59	February 23	@ Minneapolis	103–101	Dolph Schayes (30)	30–29
60	February 24	Rochester	93–109	Ed Conlin (25)	31–29
61	February 25	@ Fort Wayne	102–108	Joe Holup (20)	31–30
62	February 26	Minneapolis	108–120	Johnny Kerr (30)	32–30
63	February 27	N St. Louis	108–93	Johnny Kerr (23)	33–30
64	February 28	Fort Wayne	112–123	Johnny Kerr (32)	34–30
65	March 2	N Philadelphia	85–98	Dolph Schayes (21)	34–31
66	March 3	Philadelphia	86–112	Dolph Schayes (47)	35–31
67	March 5	@ New York	99–92	Ed Conlin (24)	36–31
68	March 6	New York	100–93	Dolph Schayes (21)	36–32
69	March 7	N New York	94–99	Dolph Schayes (21)	36–33
70	March 9	Boston	102–104	Dolph Schayes (36)	37–33
71	March 10	@ Boston	W 94–92	Dolph Schayes (22)	38–33
72	March 13	@ Fort Wayne	L 81–114	Dolph Schayes (17)	38–34

== Playoffs ==
1957 playoff game log
Division Semifinals: 2–0 (home: 1–0; road: 1–0)

Game	Date	Team	Score	High points	High rebounds	High assists	Location	Series
1	March 16	@ Philadelphia	W 103–96	Red Kerr (25)	Red Kerr (21)	Dolph Schayes (6)	Philadelphia Civic Center	1–0
2	March 18	Philadelphia	W 91–80	Red Kerr (22)	Dolph Schayes (20)	Schayes, Conlin (4)	Onondaga War Memorial	2–0

Division Finals: 0–3 (home: 0–1; road: 0–2)

Game	Date	Team	Score	High points	High rebounds	Location	Series
1	March 21	@ Boston	L 90–108	Dolph Schayes (21)	Dolph Schayes (23)	Boston Garden	0–1
2	March 23	Boston	L 105–120	Dolph Schayes (31)	Dolph Schayes (15)	Onondaga War Memorial	0–2
3	March 24	@ Boston	L 80–83	Dolph Schayes (22)	Dolph Schayes (17)	Boston Garden	0–3

1957 schedule

== Awards and records ==
- Dolph Schayes, All-NBA First Team
