= Ed Macauley =

American basketball player and coach

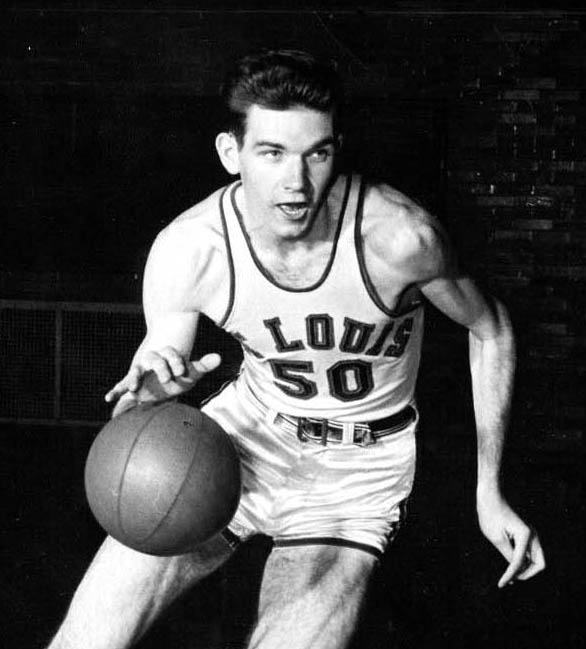
- Macauley with Saint Louis in 1948

Personal information
- Born: March 22, 1928 St. Louis, Missouri, U.S.
- Died: November 8, 2011 (aged 83) St. Louis, Missouri, U.S.
- Listed height: 6 ft 8 in (2.03 m)
- Listed weight: 185 lb (84 kg)

Career information
- High school: St. Louis University HS (St. Louis, Missouri)
- College: Saint Louis (1945–1949)
- BAA draft: 1949: territorial pick
- Drafted by: St. Louis Bombers
- Playing career: 1949–1959
- Position: Center / power forward
- Number: 50, 22, 20
- Coaching career: 1958–1960

Career history

Playing
- 1949–1950: St. Louis Bombers
- 1950–1956: Boston Celtics
- 1956–1959: St. Louis Hawks

Career highlights
- As player: NBA champion (1958); 7× NBA All-Star (1951–1957); NBA All-Star Game MVP (1951); 3× All-NBA First Team (1951–1953); All-NBA Second Team (1954); No. 22 retired by Boston Celtics; Helms Foundation Player of the Year (1948); 2× Consensus first-team All-American (1948, 1949); Third-team All-American – Helms (1947); 3× First-team All-MVC (1947–1949); No. 50 retired by Saint Louis Billikens; As coach: 2× NBA All-Star Game head coach (1959, 1960)

Career statistics
- Points: 11,234 (17.5 ppg)
- Rebounds: 4,324 (7.5 rpg)
- Assists: 2,079 (3.2 apg)
- Stats at NBA.com
- Stats at Basketball Reference
- Basketball Hall of Fame
- Collegiate Basketball Hall of Fame

Charles Edward Macauley (March 22, 1928 – November 8, 2011) was a professional basketball player and coach. His playing nickname was "Easy Ed". Macauley played in the National Basketball Association (NBA) from 1949 to 1959 for the St. Louis Bombers, Boston Celtics, and St. Louis Hawks. During his career, Macauley earned seven All-Star selections and won a championship with the Hawks in 1958. He played college basketball for the Saint Louis Billikens.

== Early life ==
Macauley attended St. Louis University High School, where he excelled in basketball.

== College career ==
Macauley attended Saint Louis University, where his team won the NIT championship in 1948. Macauley was named the "AP Player of the Year" in 1949. Macauley acquired his nickname of "Easy Ed" during a pre-game warmup in his sophomore year, when fans shouted "Take it easy, Ed" because he (the captain of the team) did not realize that the national anthem was being played when he left the locker room and ran out onto the court.

== Professional career ==
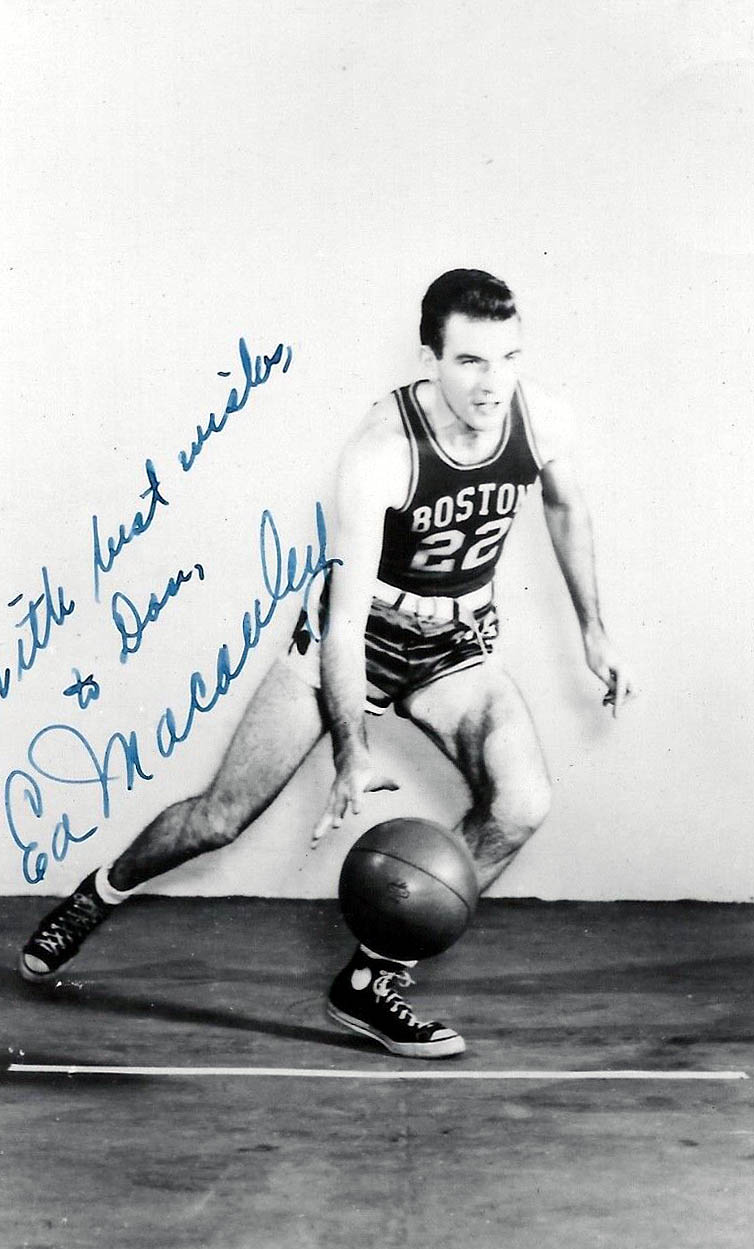
Macauley with the Boston Celtics c. 1950

Macauley played professional basketball for the St. Louis Bombers, Boston Celtics, and St. Louis Hawks.

=== St. Louis Bombers (1949–1950) ===
The Bombers selected Macauley with the fifth overall pick in the 1949 BAA Draft.

=== Boston Celtics (1950–1956) ===
After playing one season with the Bombers, Macauley was chosen by the Celtics in a 1950 dispersal draft. He played for the Celtics in the NBA from the 1950–51 season through the 1955–56 season. Macauley was named MVP of the first NBA All-Star Game (he played in the first seven) and he was named to the NBA's All-NBA First Team in three consecutive seasons. He was named to the All-NBA second team for the only time in the 1953–54 season while also leading in field goal percentage.

=== St. Louis Hawks (1956–1959) ===
Macauley was traded from the Boston Celtics to the St. Louis Hawks on the day of the 1956 NBA draft (April 29, 1956). He and Cliff Hagan were sent to the Hawks for Bill Russell, who was drafted as the second overall pick in the draft that day. For his part, Macauley convinced reluctant Celtics owner Walter A. Brown to trade him to St. Louis, as Macauley's son had been diagnosed with spinal meningitis and was in St. Louis receiving care. All three players eventually made the Hall of Fame, although Russell is considered one of the greatest players in league history.

Macauley made the NBA Finals in 1957, averaging 14.9 points and 5.9 rebounds per game in the seven-game series. The Hawks were defeated by the Celtics (who were making their first Finals appearance in team history) in seven games. In the 1958 NBA Finals, the Hawks faced the Boston Celtics. The Hawks had four future Hall of Famers, while the Celtics had eight. Macauley averaged 5.8 points and 6.3 rebounds in the series, which the Hawks won in six games.

Macauley was named player-coach of the Hawks for the 1958–59 season, and he played in 14 regular-season games before retiring as a player. After leading the Hawks to the 1960 NBA Finals (which they lost in seven games to the Celtics), Macauley retired from coaching. In the two years Macauley coached the Hawks, he led them to an 89–48 record and a 9–11 playoff record.

== Broadcasting career ==
After retiring from basketball, Macauley became a sportscaster at KTVI, a St. Louis television station.

== Post-playing career ==
In 1989, Macauley was ordained a deacon of the Catholic Church. With Father Francis Friedl, he co-authored the book Homilies Alive: Creating Homilies That Hit Home.

== Basketball legacy ==
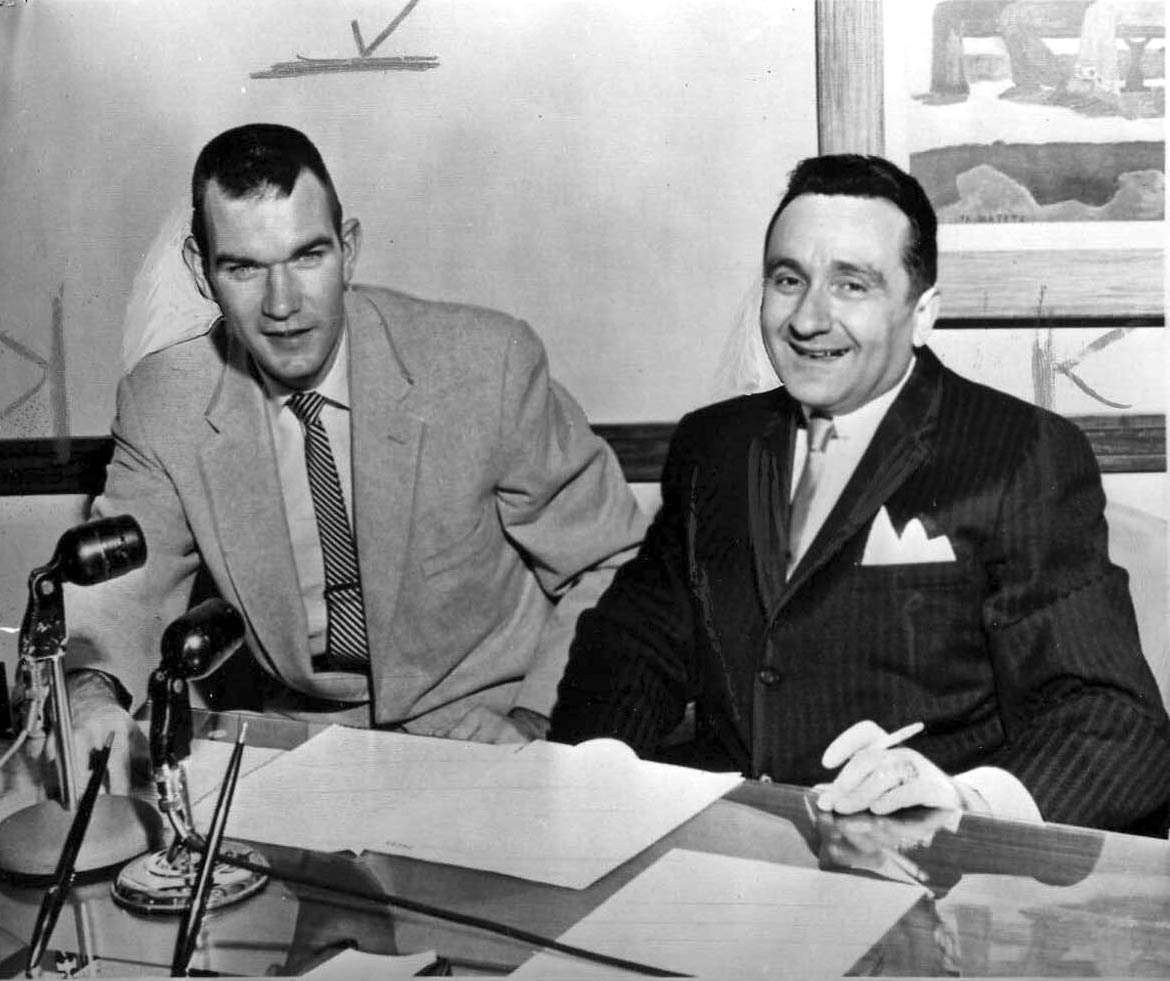
Macauley (left) becoming coach of Saint Louis in November 1958

Macauley scored 11,234 points in ten NBA seasons and was inducted into the Naismith Memorial Basketball Hall of Fame in 1960. At age 32, he still holds the record for being the youngest male player to be admitted. His uniform number 22 was retired by the Celtics on October 16, 1963, the same date when the Celtics retired the number of his teammate, Bob Cousy. Macauley was also awarded a star on the St. Louis Walk of Fame. As of 2019, Macauley was one of only two Celtics to have his number retired without having won a championship with the team; the other was Reggie Lewis.

== Personal life ==
Macauley and his wife, Jackie, had seven children and 17 grandchildren. He suffered from Alzheimer's disease. Macauley died on November 8, 2011, at his home in St. Louis at the age of 83.

== NBA career statistics ==
Legend
GP	Games played	GS	Games started	MPG	Minutes per game
FG%	Field goal percentage	3P%	3-point field goal percentage	FT%	Free throw percentage
RPG	Rebounds per game	APG	Assists per game	SPG	Steals per game
BPG	Blocks per game	PPG	Points per game	**Bold**	Career high
†	Won an NBA championship	*	Led the league

=== Regular season ===
Year	Team	GP	MPG	FG%	FT%	RPG	APG	PPG
1949–50	St. Louis	67	–	.398	.718	–	3.0	16.1
1950–51	Boston	68	–	.466	.759	**9.1**	3.7	**20.4**
1951–52	Boston	66	39.9	.432	**.799**	8.0	3.5	19.2
1952–53	Boston	69	**42.1**	.452*	.750	**9.1**	**4.1**	20.3
1953–54	Boston	71	39.3	**.486***	.758	8.0	3.8	18.9
1954–55	Boston	71	38.1	.424	.792	8.5	3.9	17.6
1955–56	Boston	71	33.2	.422	.794	5.9	3.0	17.5
1956–57	St. Louis	**72**	35.9	.419	.749	6.1	2.8	16.5
1957–58†	St. Louis	**72**	26.5	.428	.724	6.6	2.0	14.2
1958–59	St. Louis	14	14.0	.293	.600	2.9	0.9	4.6
Career		641	35.7	.436	.761	7.5	3.2	17.5
All-Star		7	22.0	.387	.854	4.6	2.6	11.9

=== Playoffs ===
Year	Team	GP	MPG	FG%	FT%	RPG	APG	PPG
1951	Boston	2	–	.472	.625	9.0	4.0	20.4
1952	Boston	3	43.0	**.551**	**.842**	**11.0**	3.7	**23.3**
1953	Boston	6	**46.3**	.437	.722	9.7	3.5	16.8
1954	Boston	5	25.4	.364	.692	4.2	4.2	5.0
1955	Boston	7	40.4	.462	.759	7.4	**4.6**	18.1
1956	Boston	3	24.3	.400	.636	5.0	1.7	10.3
1957	St. Louis	10	29.7	.404	.730	6.2	2.2	14.2
1958†	St. Louis	**11**	20.6	.404	.720	5.6	1.6	9.8
Career		47	31.4	.437	.729	6.8	2.9	13.8

== Head coaching record ==
Team	Year	G	W	L	W–L%	Finish	PG	PW	PL	PW–L%	Result
St. Louis	1958–59	62	43	19	.694	1st in Western	6	2	4	.333	Lost Western Division finals 2–4
St. Louis	1959–60	75	46	29	.613	1st in Western	14	7	7	.500	Lost NBA Finals 3–4
Career		137	89	48	.650		20	9	11	.450	
