= 1956–57 Boston Celtics season =

NBA basketball team season (Season champions)

- NBA champions
- Division champions
- Head coach: Red Auerbach
- Arena: Boston Garden

Results
- Record: 44–28 (.611)
- Place: Division: 1st (Eastern)
- Playoff finish: NBA champions (Defeated Hawks 4–3)
- Stats at Basketball Reference
- Radio: WHDH

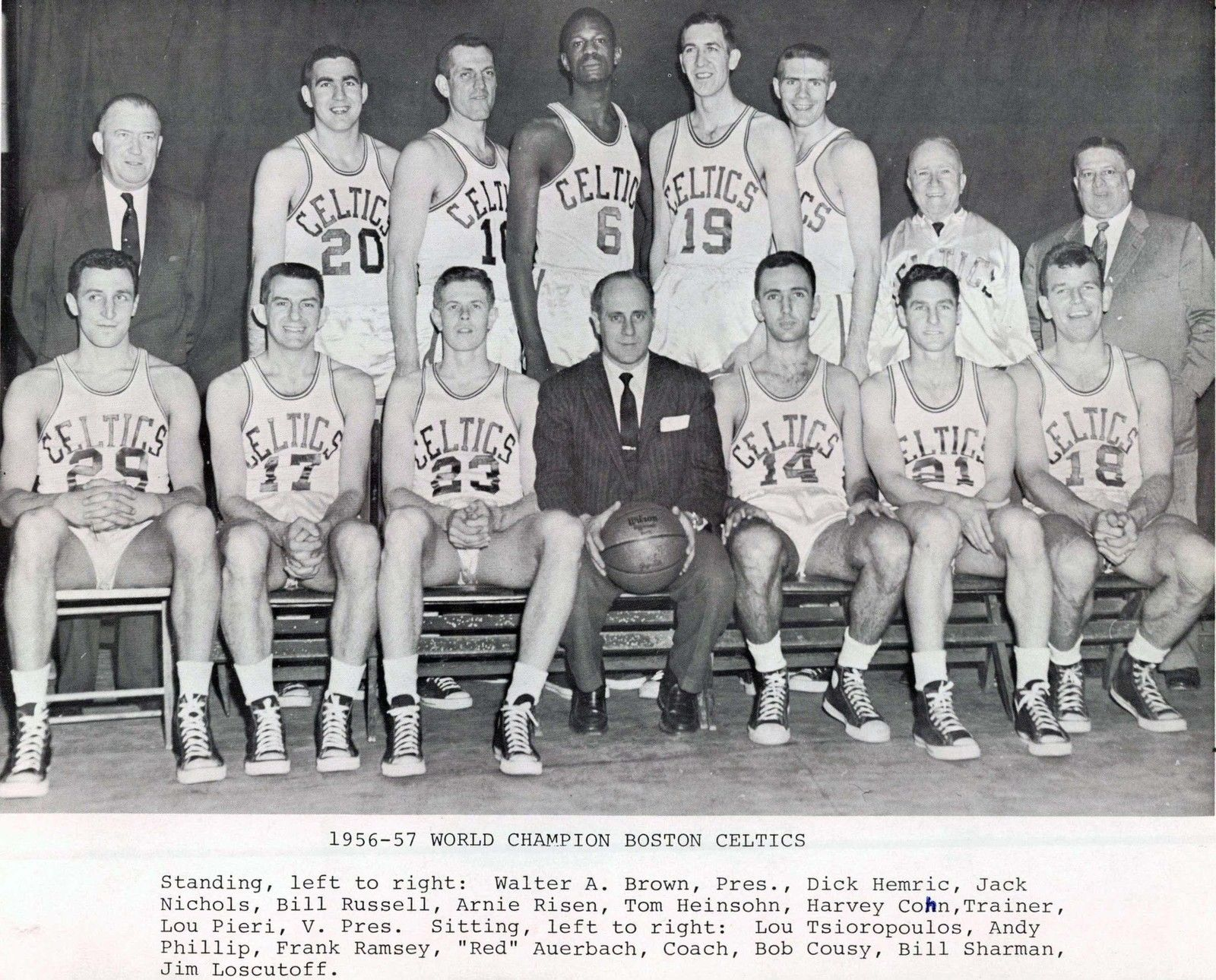
The 1956-57 complete roster that won their first championship.

The 1956–57 Boston Celtics season was the 11th season for the franchise in the National Basketball Association (NBA). This was the first time in franchise history where the Celtics advanced to the NBA Finals, which they won over the St. Louis Hawks in 7 games. The Celtics would make the Finals a record 10 consecutive seasons, spanning from this season to the 1965–66 season. They were led by 1957's MVP Bob Cousy, as well as Bill Russell, Bill Sharman, and 1957's Rookie of the Year Tom Heinsohn. HoopsHype would later rank this championship squad as tied with the 1955–56 Philadelphia Warriors team a season prior as the team with the second-easiest path to the NBA Finals ever in 2024 due to them being one of three total championship teams who had playoff opponents that averaged around an average overall record or less during their championship run.

With Russell's death in 2022, Bob Cousy is the only living player from the 1957 championship team (as of 2026).

== Roster ==
1956–57 Boston Celtics roster
Players

Pos.	No.	Player	Height	Weight	DOB	From
G	14	Bob Cousy	6 ft 1 in (1.85 m)	175 lb (79 kg)	1928-08-09	Holy Cross
F/C	15	Tom Heinsohn	6 ft 7 in (2.01 m)	218 lb (99 kg)	1934-08-26	Holy Cross
F	20	Dick Hemric	6 ft 6 in (1.98 m)	220 lb (100 kg)	1933-08-29	Wake Forest
F	18	Jim Loscutoff	6 ft 5 in (1.96 m)	220 lb (100 kg)	1930-02-04	Oregon
F/C	16	Jack Nichols	6 ft 7 in (2.01 m)	222 lb (101 kg)	1926-04-09	Washington
G	17	Andy Phillip	6 ft 2 in (1.88 m)	195 lb (88 kg)	1922-03-07	Illinois
G/F	23	Frank Ramsey	6 ft 3 in (1.91 m)	190 lb (86 kg)	1931-07-13	Kentucky
F/C	19	Arnie Risen	6 ft 9 in (2.06 m)	200 lb (91 kg)	1924-10-09	Ohio State
C	6	Bill Russell	6 ft 9 in (2.06 m)	215 lb (98 kg)	1934-02-12	San Francisco
G	21	Bill Sharman	6 ft 1 in (1.85 m)	175 lb (79 kg)	1926-05-25	USC
F	29	Lou Tsioropoulos	6 ft 5 in (1.96 m)	190 lb (86 kg)	1930-08-31	Kentucky

Coaches
Head coach
- Red Auerbach

Legend
- (DP) Unsigned draft pick
- (FA) Free agent
- (S) Suspended
- Injured

== Regular season ==
=== Season standings ===
Eastern Division	W	L	PCT	GB	Home	Road	Neutral	Div
x-Boston Celtics	44	28	.611	-	24-4	11-18	9-6	20-16
x-Syracuse Nationals	38	34	.528	6	23-9	9-15	6-10	20-16
x-Philadelphia Warriors	37	35	.514	7	20-5	5–25	12-5	17-19
New York Knicks	36	36	.500	8	18-10	9-19	9-7	15-21

=== Game log ===
1956–57 Game log
#	Date	Opponent	Score	High points	Record
1	October 27	@ New York	115–112	Bob Cousy (35)	1–0
2	November 3	New York	113–107	Bill Sharman (31)	1–1
3	November 10	Minneapolis	110–117	Bob Cousy (27)	2–1
4	November 11	@ Syracuse	94–83	Bill Sharman (28)	3–1
5	November 14	N Minneapolis	113–97	Bill Sharman (28)	3–2
6	November 15	@ Fort Wayne	95–98	Bill Sharman (24)	3–3
7	November 17	Rochester	86–108	Jim Loscutoff (20)	4–3
8	November 18	@ Rochester	101–87	Bill Sharman (32)	5–3
9	November 21	Philadelphia	83–95	Bill Sharman (28)	6–3
10	November 22	@ Philadelphia	101–78	Bill Sharman (30)	7–3
11	November 24	Syracuse	99–114	Cousy, Sharman (21)	8–3
12	November 27	@ St. Louis	102–90	Bob Cousy (27)	9–3
13	November 28	N Minneapolis	93–105	Jim Loscutoff (26)	10–3
14	November 30	N Fort Wayne	102–104	Arnie Risen (22)	11–3
15	December 1	Fort Wayne	93–108	Bill Sharman (22)	12–3
16	December 4	N St. Louis	107–108	Cousy, Heinsohn (26)	13–3
17	December 6	@ Philadelphia	111–113	Bob Cousy (32)	13–4
18	December 7	Minneapolis	114–121	Bob Cousy (34)	14–4
19	December 9	@ Syracuse	110–116	Tom Heinsohn (25)	14–5
20	December 11	N Fort Wayne	97–113	Tom Heinsohn (34)	15–5
21	December 12	Rochester	103–93	Bob Cousy (23)	15–6
22	December 15	St. Louis	99–102	Bob Cousy (26)	16–6
23	December 16	N Philadelphia	116–104	Bob Cousy (21)	16–7
24	December 18	@ New York	99–110	Bob Cousy (35)	16–8
25	December 22	St. Louis	93–95	Tom Heinsohn (19)	17–8
26	December 23	@ Fort Wayne	87–95	Bill Sharman (26)	17–9
27	December 25	N Philadelphia	89–82	Bob Cousy (22)	17–10
28	December 26	Philadelphia	97–120	Dickie Hemric (27)	18–10
29	December 27	N Rochester	92–97	Bill Sharman (19)	19–10
30	December 30	Syracuse	92–105	Bill Sharman (28)	20–10
31	January 1	N Philadelphia	87–100	Tom Heinsohn (30)	21–10
32	January 4	N Syracuse	116–106	Bob Cousy (32)	21–11
33	January 6	Fort Wayne	92–118	Bob Cousy (20)	22–11
34	January 8	@ New York	102–113	Cousy, Sharman (25)	22–12
35	January 10	@ Fort Wayne	98–81	Jim Loscutoff (22)	23–12
36	January 12	@ St. Louis	98–100	Bill Sharman (32)	23–13
37	January 13	@ Minneapolis	87–104	Bill Sharman (24)	23–14
38	January 18	St. Louis	117–126	Bill Sharman (33)	24–14
39	January 19	@ Rochester	97–83	Bob Cousy (33)	25–14
40	January 20	New York	78–114	Bob Cousy (32)	26–14
41	January 23	Syracuse	108–140	Bill Sharman (22)	27–14
42	January 25	Minneapolis	106–115	Bob Cousy (30)	28–14
43	January 27	@ Philadelphia	107–87	Bill Sharman (30)	29–14
44	January 28	Philadelphia	95–105	Bob Cousy (22)	30–14
45	January 29	N Minneapolis	91–103	Bill Sharman (32)	31–14
46	January 30	Syracuse	119–116	Bill Sharman (26)	31–15
47	January 31	@ Syracuse	104–105	Bill Sharman (30)	31–16
48	February 2	@ New York	114–111	Bill Russell (22)	32–16
49	February 3	New York	98–116	Bill Sharman (33)	33–16
50	February 5	N Syracuse	101–105	Bob Cousy (24)	34–16
51	February 6	Fort Wayne	93–108	Bill Sharman (28)	35–16
52	February 8	N New York	92–90	Frank Ramsey (23)	35–17
53	February 9	@ Rochester	102–103	Tom Heinsohn (20)	35–18
54	February 10	Philadelphia	98–103 (OT)	Bob Cousy (26)	36–18
55	February 13	@ Minneapolis	114–115	Cousy, Heinsohn (27)	36–19
56	February 14	@ Fort Wayne	106–112	Frank Ramsey (25)	36–20
57	February 15	@ St. Louis	123–116 (2OT)	Bob Cousy (33)	37–20
58	February 17	@ Syracuse	106–116	Bill Russell (23)	37–21
59	February 19	@ New York	112–110	Bob Cousy (27)	38–21
60	February 21	St. Louis	112–125	Tom Heinsohn (32)	39–21
61	February 22	@ Philadelphia	109–117	Heinsohn, Russell (30)	39–22
62	February 24	New York	85–97	Bill Sharman (27)	40–22
63	February 26	N Rochester	77–92	Bill Sharman (32)	41–22
64	February 28	N New York	122–121 (OT)	Tom Heinsohn (35)	41–23
65	March 1	Philadelphia	80–90	Ramsey, Sharman (19)	42–23
66	March 2	@ Rochester	87–96	Tom Heinsohn (20)	42–24
67	March 3	Rochester	102–111	Bill Russell (30)	43–24
68	March 5	@ St. Louis	102–104	Tom Heinsohn (41)	43–25
69	March 7	@ Minneapolis	104–109	Bill Sharman (26)	43–26
70	March 9	@ Syracuse	102–104	Bill Sharman (27)	43–27
71	March 10	Syracuse	94–92	Bill Sharman (24)	43–28
72	March 13	New York	91–122	Bill Sharman (28)	44–28

== Player statistics ==
Legend
GP	Games played	MPG	Minutes per game
FG%	Field-goal percentage	FT%	Free-throw percentage
RPG	Rebounds per game	APG	Assists per game
PPG	Points per game

=== Season ===
Player	GP	MPG	FG%	FT%	RPG	APG	PPG
Bob Cousy	64	36.9	.378	.821	4.8	7.5	20.6
Tom Heinsohn	72	29.9	.397	.790	9.8	1.6	16.2
Dick Hemric	67	15.7	.344	.695	4.5	0.6	5.4
Jim Loscutoff	70	31.7	.345	.706	10.4	1.3	10.6
Jack Nichols	61	22.5	.363	.794	6.1	1.4	8.2
Togo Palazzi*	21	11.1	.347	.719	3.6	0.4	5.0
Andy Phillip	67	22.0	.379	.642	2.7	2.5	4.4
Frank Ramsey	35	23.1	.393	.791	5.1	1.9	11.9
Arnie Risen	43	21.7	.388	.679	6.7	1.2	8.0
Bill Russell	48	35.3	.427	.492	19.6	1.8	14.7
Bill Sharman	67	35.9	.416	.905	4.3	3.5	21.1
Lou Tsioropoulos	52	12.9	.309	.775	4.0	0.6	4.4

* – Stats with the Celtics.

=== Playoffs ===
Player	GP	MPG	FG%	FT%	RPG	APG	PPG
Bob Cousy	10	44.0	.324	.747	6.1	9.3	20.2
Tom Heinsohn	10	37.0	.390	.710	11.7	2.0	22.9
Dick Hemric	2	9.5	.143	.	4.5	0.5	1.0
Jim Loscutoff	10	25.9	.284	.643	8.3	0.5	8.0
Jack Nichols	10	11.7	.400	.600	1.7	0.7	3.5
Andy Phillip	10	12.8	.364	.400	2.0	1.7	2.2
Frank Ramsey	10	22.9	.463	.780	4.3	1.7	12.2
Arnie Risen	10	15.2	.444	.655	5.8	0.8	7.5
Bill Russell	10	40.9	.365	.508	24.4	3.2	13.9
Bill Sharman	10	37.7	.381	.953	3.5	2.9	21.1

== Playoffs ==
1957 playoff game log
Division Finals: 3–0 (home: 2–0; road: 1–0)

Game	Date	Team	Score	High points	High rebounds	Location	Series
1	March 21	Syracuse	W 108–90	Frank Ramsey (20)	Bill Russell (31)	Boston Garden	1–0
2	March 23	@ Syracuse	W 120–105	Tom Heinsohn (30)	Bill Russell (30)	Onondaga War Memorial	2–0
3	March 24	Syracuse	W 83–80	Bill Sharman (23)	Bill Russell (23)	Boston Garden	3–0

NBA Finals: 4–3 (home: 3–1; road: 1–2)

Game	Date	Team	Score	High points	High rebounds	High assists	Location Attendance	Series
1	March 30	St. Louis	L 123–125 (2OT)	Bill Sharman (36)	Bill Russell (18)	—	Boston Garden; 5,976	0–1
2	March 31	St. Louis	W 119–99	Cousy, Ramsey (22)	Bill Russell (25)	Bob Cousy (7)	Boston Garden; 13,909	1–1
3	April 6	@ St. Louis	L 98–100	Bill Sharman (28)	Bill Russell (19)	Bob Cousy (8)	Kiel Auditorium; 10,048	1–2
4	April 7	@ St. Louis	W 123–118	Bob Cousy (31)	Bill Russell (20)	Arnie Risen (9)	Kiel Auditorium; 10,035	2–2
5	April 9	St. Louis	W 124–109	Bill Sharman (32)	Bill Russell (23)	Bob Cousy (19)	Boston Garden; 13,909	3–2
6	April 11	@ St. Louis	L 94–96	Tom Heinsohn (28)	Bill Russell (23)	—	Kiel Auditorium; 10,053	3–3
7	April 13	St. Louis	W 125–123 (2OT)	Tom Heinsohn (37)	Bill Russell (32)	Bob Cousy (11)	Boston Garden; 13,909	4–3

1957 schedule

== Awards and honors ==
- Bob Cousy, NBA MVP of the Year
- Bob Cousy, All-NBA First Team
- Tom Heinsohn, NBA Rookie of the Year
- Bill Sharman, All-NBA First Team
