= 1956–57 Rochester Royals season =

Ninth season of the Royals in the NBA

- Head coach: Bobby Wanzer
- Owners: Jack Harrison; Les Harrison
- Arena: Rochester Community War Memorial

Results
- Record: 31–41 (.431)
- Place: Division: 4th (Western)
- Playoff finish: Did not qualify
- Stats at Basketball Reference

Local media
- Television: WHAM-TV
- Radio: WROC

The 1956–57 Rochester Royals season was the Royals ninth season in the NBA.

It was also the franchise's final season in Rochester. The team relocated to Cincinnati during the offseason.

== Preseason ==
=== Draft picks ===
Round	Pick	Player	Position	Nationality	School/Club team
	63	Dan Mannix	Forward	United States	St. Francis (NY)

== Regular season ==
=== Season standings ===
Western Division	W	L	PCT	GB	Home	Road	Neutral	Div
x-St. Louis Hawks	34	38	.472	-	17-9	10-20	7-9	22-14
x-Minneapolis Lakers	34	38	.472	-	15-9	5-22	14-7	18-18
x-Fort Wayne Pistons	34	38	.472	-	23-5	5-23	6-10	17-19
Rochester Royals	31	41	.431	3	19-10	7-17	5-14	15-21

x – clinched playoff spot

=== Game log ===
1956–57 Game log
#	Date	Opponent	Score	High points	Record
1	October 27	Fort Wayne	85–88	Richie Regan (22)	1–0
2	October 28	@ Syracuse	75–91	Jack Twyman (15)	1–1
3	November 1	N Minneapolis	88–97	Regan, Twyman (15)	1–2
4	November 3	Minneapolis	95–85	Sihugo Green (19)	1–3
5	November 4	@ Minneapolis	87–88	Richie Regan (19)	1–4
6	November 7	Philadelphia	80–81	Maurice Stokes (17)	2–4
7	November 9	@ Philadelphia	95–93	Maurice Stokes (21)	3–4
8	November 10	Syracuse	76–90	Green, Twyman (19)	4–4
9	November 11	N Minneapolis	94–82	Maurice Stokes (24)	5–4
10	November 13	@ St. Louis	105–118	Jack Twyman (27)	5–5
11	November 14	New York	87–90	Regan, Ricketts (15)	6–5
12	November 15	N Philadelphia	83–92	Maurice Stokes (22)	6–6
13	November 17	@ Boston	86–108	Dick Ricketts (20)	6–7
14	November 18	Boston	101–87	Richie Regan (14)	6–8
15	November 21	St. Louis	76–85	Dave Piontek (20)	7–8
16	November 22	@ Fort Wayne	102–104 (OT)	Dick Ricketts (25)	7–9
17	November 24	@ New York	96–87	Art Spoelstra (20)	8–9
18	November 25	New York	93–95	Dick Ricketts (21)	9–9
19	November 27	N Syracuse	82–90	Dave Piontek (28)	10–9
20	December 1	Minneapolis	83–95	Dick Ricketts (20)	11–9
21	December 6	N New York	92–95	Dick Ricketts (21)	11–10
22	December 8	Philadelphia	91–92	Maurice Stokes (20)	12–10
23	December 9	@ Fort Wayne	101–100 (OT)	Maurice Stokes (18)	13–10
24	December 12	@ Boston	103–93	Regan, Twyman (23)	14–10
25	December 15	New York	91–76	Maurice Stokes (16)	14–11
26	December 16	@ Minneapolis	97–101	Richie Regan (17)	14–12
27	December 20	N Minneapolis	103–105	Jack Twyman (24)	14–13
28	December 22	Minneapolis	101–115	Maurice Stokes (27)	15–13
29	December 25	Syracuse	93–98	Dave Piontek (16)	16–13
30	December 26	N Fort Wayne	93–99	Art Spoelstra (20)	16–14
31	December 27	N Boston	92–97	Jack Twyman (19)	16–15
32	December 29	Fort Wayne	88–95	Ricketts, Spoelstra (19)	17–15
33	December 30	@ New York	88–96	Spoelstra, Twyman (16)	17–16
34	January 1	St. Louis	101–102 (OT)	Jack Twyman (21)	18–16
35	January 5	Philadelphia	81–78	Art Spoelstra (17)	18–17
36	January 6	@ St. Louis	93–86	Maurice Stokes (19)	19–17
37	January 8	N Philadelphia	95–94	Maurice Stokes (22)	20–17
38	January 10	@ Philadelphia	93–112	Maurice Stokes (17)	20–18
39	January 12	Syracuse	97–88	Spoelstra, Twyman (18)	20–19
40	January 13	@ Syracuse	85–91	Maurice Stokes (22)	20–20
41	January 16	St. Louis	108–106 (OT)	Maurice Stokes (31)	20–21
42	January 19	Boston	97–83	Jack Twyman (25)	20–22
43	January 20	@ Minneapolis	107–114	Jack Twyman (22)	20–23
44	January 23	N Minneapolis	99–107	Jack Twyman (19)	20–24
45	January 25	N St. Louis	100–99	Maurice Stokes (33)	20–25
46	January 26	Syracuse	99–95	Jack Twyman (20)	20–26
47	January 27	@ St. Louis	83–107	Jack Twyman (20)	20–27
48	January 30	N New York	80–92	Art Spoelstra (19)	20–28
49	February 1	N Fort Wayne	96–80	Jack Twyman (23)	21–28
50	February 2	Fort Wayne	79–93	Jack Twyman (24)	22–28
51	February 3	N Philadelphia	108–110	Dick Ricketts (25)	22–29
52	February 5	@ New York	91–88	Maurice Stokes (20)	23–29
53	February 6	St. Louis	100–103	Jack Twyman (22)	24–29
54	February 9	Boston	102–103	Ricketts, Twyman (22)	25–29
55	February 10	@ St. Louis	93–117	Jack Twyman (21)	25–30
56	February 13	New York	85–82	Ed Fleming (14)	25–31
57	February 14	@ Syracuse	104–95	Maurice Stokes (27)	26–31
58	February 16	Fort Wayne	87–84	Maurice Stokes (27)	26–32
59	February 17	@ Fort Wayne	85–104	Jack Twyman (26)	26–33
60	February 20	@ Minneapolis	103–111	Jack Twyman (25)	26–34
61	February 22	N Fort Wayne	105–110	Jack Twyman (27)	26–35
62	February 23	St. Louis	86–101	Jack Twyman (18)	27–35
63	February 24	@ Syracuse	93–109	Maurice Stokes (26)	27–36
64	February 26	N Boston	77–92	Ed Fleming (21)	27–37
65	February 27	Fort Wayne	76–90	Bob Burrow (18)	28–37
66	March 1	N Minneapolis	117–125	Jack Twyman (28)	28–38
67	March 2	Boston	87–96	Maurice Stokes (24)	29–38
68	March 3	@ Boston	102–111	Maurice Stokes (17)	29–39
69	March 6	Philadelphia	79–82	Bob Burrow (17)	30–39
70	March 8	N St. Louis	100–92	Jack Twyman (24)	30–40
71	March 10	@ Fort Wayne	96–100	Regan, Stokes (16)	30–41
72	March 13	N St. Louis	99–104	Bob Burrow (19)	31–41

== Player statistics ==
Legend
GP	Games played	GS	Games started	MPG	Minutes per game
FG%	Field-goal percentage	3P%	3-point field-goal percentage	FT%	Free-throw percentage
RPG	Rebounds per game	APG	Assists per game	SPG	Steals per game
BPG	Blocks per game	PPG	Points per game

Player	GP	GS	MPG	FG%	3FG%	FT%	RPG	APG	SPG	BPG	PPG
Bob Burrow											
Ed Fleming											
Si Green											
Lew Hitch											
Tom Marshall											
Johnny McCarthy											
Dave Piontek											
Richie Regan											
Dick Ricketts											
Art Spoelstra											
Maurice Stokes											
Jack Twyman											
Bobby Wanzer											

== Awards and records ==
- Maurice Stokes, All-NBA Second Team
