= Kiel Auditorium =

Arena in Missouri, United States

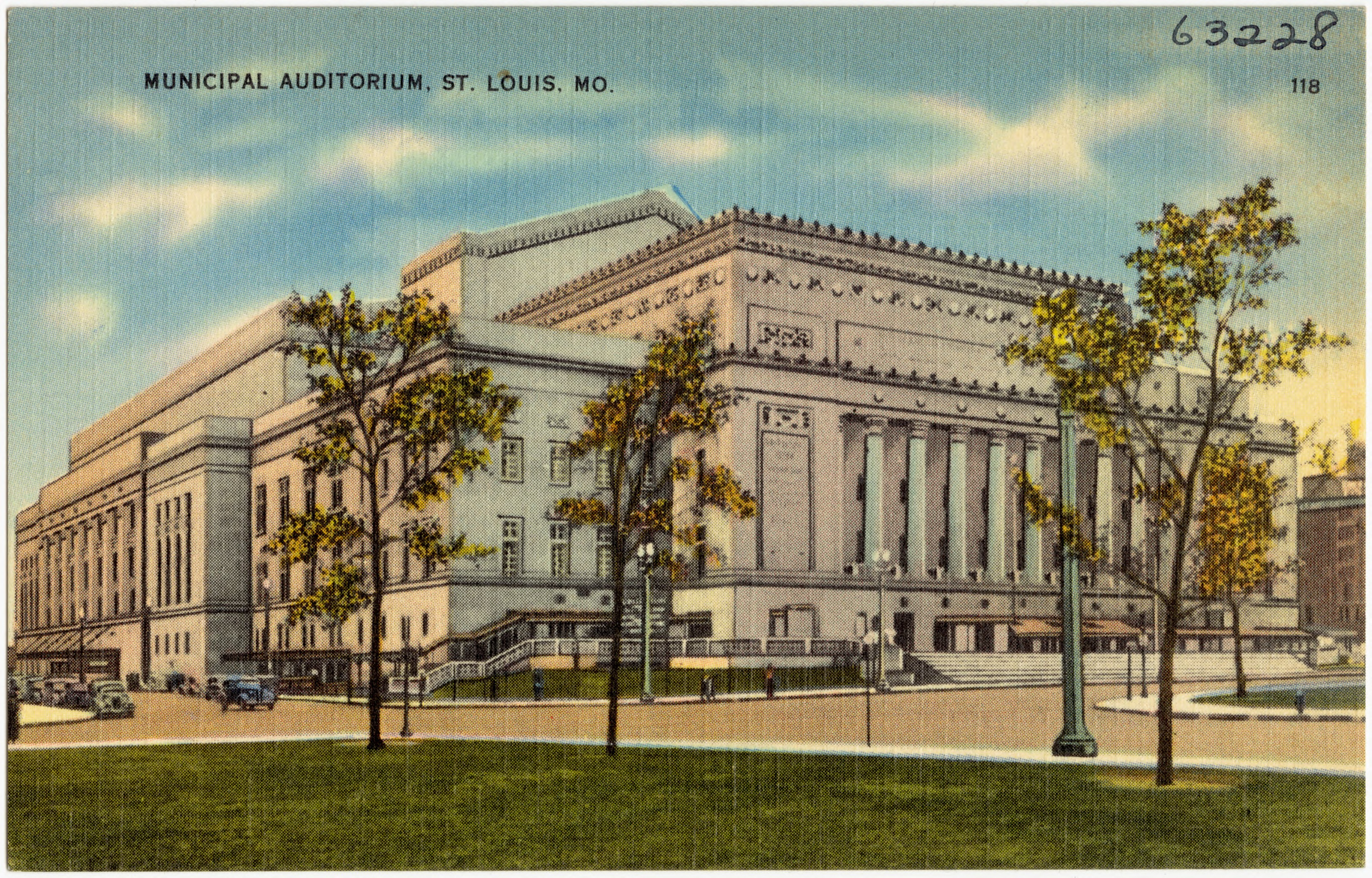
- Interactive map of Kiel Auditorium
- Former names: Municipal Auditorium (1934–1943)
- Location: 1401 Clark Avenue; St. Louis, Missouri 63103
- Coordinates: 38.627972°N 90.201782°W
- Capacity: 9,300

Construction
- Opened: April 14, 1934
- Closed: April 27, 1991
- Demolished: 1992
- Cost: $6 million
- Architect: LaBeaume & Klein

Tenants
- Saint Louis Billikens (NCAA) (1945–1968, 1973–1991); St. Louis Hawks (NBA) (1955–1968); St. Louis Streak (WBL) (1979–1981)

Kiel Auditorium was an indoor arena located in St. Louis, Missouri. It was the home of the Saint Louis University basketball team, and hosted the NBA's St. Louis Hawks from 1955 to 1968.

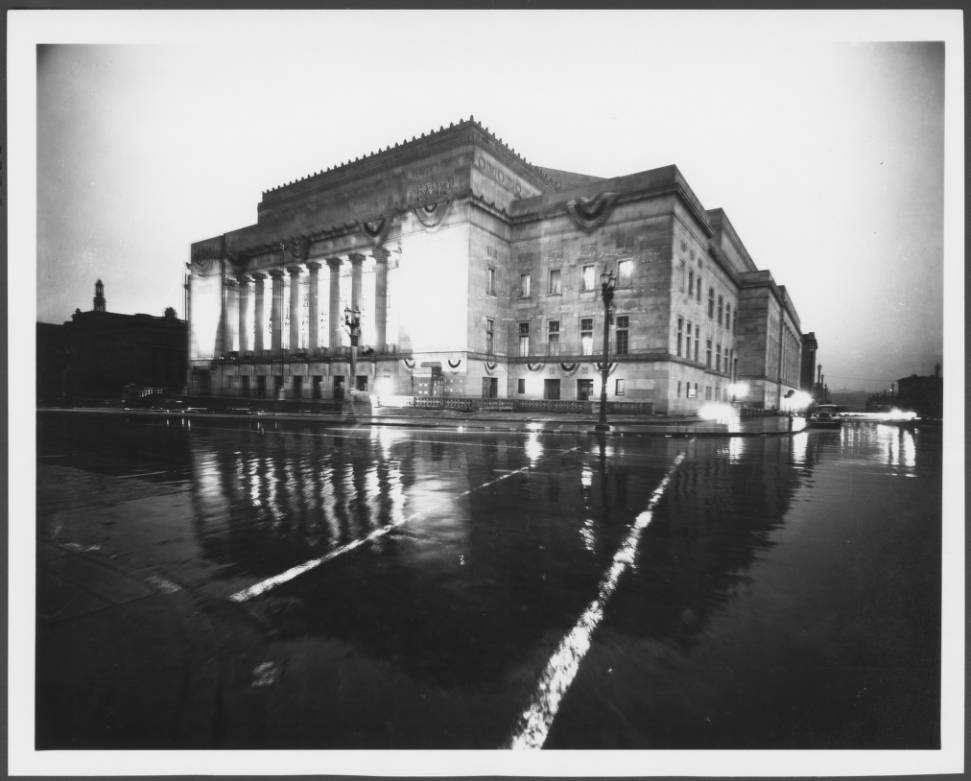
Municipal Auditorium as it appeared in a 1934 nighttime view

From 1913 to 1930, the site was home to Charles H. Turpin's Booker T. Washington Theater where performers included his brother Tom Turpin.

The Municipal Arena was completed in 1934 at a cost of $6 million. It seated 9,300 and was built by Fruin-Colnon Construction. The Kiel Auditorium replaced the St. Louis Coliseum as the city's main indoor arena. The Kiel was originally named the Municipal Auditorium, but was renamed in honor of former St. Louis Mayor Henry Kiel in 1943. A unique feature of the auditorium was that it was split into two; the front of the building was the Kiel Opera House. It was possible to use both sides at once as the stages were back to back. President Harry Truman gave a speech there in which both sides were opened to see his speech.

In 1955, the auditorium was the venue for the second international conference of Alcoholics Anonymous, which established the service conference structure for the movement.

Kiel Auditorium played host to a variety of concerts and sports events until its closure in 1991. The Grateful Dead played the Auditorium seven times between 1969 and 1982. In 1983, it was the host of the Miss Universe Pageant. From the 1950s until the 1970s, the Kiel Auditorium was behind only Madison Square Garden as North America's most famous wrestling arena, hosting three NWA World Heavyweight Championship title changes from 1959 until 1986. The most notable wrestling event that took place at the Kiel Auditorium was WCW's premier event, Starrcade 1990. The building was demolished in 1992, but not before hosting the Missouri Valley Conference men's basketball tournament the preceding year.

After its demolition, its games and concerts temporarily went to the St. Louis Arena.

The Enterprise Center (originally named "Kiel Center", then "Savvis Center", then "Scottrade Center", before the current naming rights were purchased) now stands on the site of the former Kiel Auditorium. The Opera House portion of the building, on the northern part of the property, facing Market Street, was not torn down. It remained vacant for a while, but was renovated and reopened under the name Peabody Opera House in 2011. It is now known as the Stifel Theatre.

Events and tenants
Preceded by Milwaukee Arena	Home of the St. Louis Hawks; 1955 – 1968	Succeeded by Alexander Memorial Coliseum
Preceded by Boston Garden; Onondaga County War Memorial Coliseum; Boston Garden	Host of the NBA All-Star Game; 1958; 1962; 1965	Succeeded by Olympia Stadium; Los Angeles Memorial Sports Arena; Cincinnati Gardens
Preceded by Coliseo Amauta (Peru) Lima	Miss Universe venue 1983	Succeeded by James L. Knight Convention Center (United States) Miami, FL
