= 1956–57 NBA season =

11th NBA season

- League: National Basketball Association
- Sport: Basketball
- Duration: October 27, 1956 – March 13, 1957; March 14–25, 1957 (Playoffs); March 30 – April 13, 1957 (Finals)
- Games: 72
- Teams: 8
- TV partner: NBC

Draft
- Top draft pick: Sihugo Green
- Picked by: Rochester Royals

Regular season
- Season champions: Boston Celtics
- Season MVP: Bob Cousy (Boston)
- Top scorer: Paul Arizin (Philadelphia)

Playoffs
- Eastern champions: Boston Celtics
- Eastern runners-up: Syracuse Nationals
- Western champions: St. Louis Hawks
- Western runners-up: Minneapolis Lakers

Finals
- Champions: Boston Celtics
- Runners-up: St. Louis Hawks

NBA seasons
- ← 1955–56 1957–58 →

The 1956–57 NBA season was the 11th season of the National Basketball Association. The season ended with the Boston Celtics winning the NBA championship (which would be the first of their 18 NBA titles), beating the St. Louis Hawks 4 games to 3 in the NBA Finals.

== Notable occurrences ==
- The 1957 NBA All-Star Game was played in Boston, Massachusetts, with the East beating the West 109–97. Local hero Bob Cousy of the Boston Celtics wins the game's MVP award.

Coaching changes
In-season
Team	Outgoing coach	Incoming coach
St. Louis Hawks	Red Holzman	Slater Martin; Alex Hannum
Syracuse Nationals	Al Cervi	Paul Seymour

== Final standings ==
=== Eastern Division ===
Eastern Division	W	L	PCT	GB	Home	Road	Neutral	Div
x-Boston Celtics	44	28	.611	-	24-4	11-18	9-6	20-16
x-Syracuse Nationals	38	34	.528	6	23-9	9-15	6-10	20-16
x-Philadelphia Warriors	37	35	.514	7	20-5	5–25	12-5	17-19
New York Knicks	36	36	.500	8	18-10	9-19	9-7	15-21

=== Western Division ===
Western Division	W	L	PCT	GB	Home	Road	Neutral	Div
x-St. Louis Hawks	34	38	.472	-	17-9	10-20	7-9	22-14
x-Minneapolis Lakers	34	38	.472	-	15-9	5-22	14-7	18-18
x-Fort Wayne Pistons	34	38	.472	-	23-5	5-23	6-10	17-19
Rochester Royals	31	41	.431	3	19-10	7-17	5-14	15-21

- St. Louis finished ahead of Fort Wayne and Minneapolis by defeating them in tiebreaker matches.

x – clinched playoff spot

== Playoffs ==
Division Semifinals
E3	Philadelphia	0
E2	Syracuse	2
W3	Fort Wayne	0
W2	Minneapolis	2

Division Finals
Eastern Division
E1	Boston*	3
E2	Syracuse	0
Western Division
W1	St. Louis*	3
W2	Minneapolis	0

NBA Finals
E1	Boston*	4
W1	St. Louis*	3

- * Division winner
- Bold Series winner
- Italic Team with home-court advantage in NBA Finals

== Statistics leaders ==
Category	Player	Team	Stat
Points	Paul Arizin	Philadelphia Warriors	1,817
Rebounds	Maurice Stokes	Rochester Royals	1,256
Assists	Bob Cousy	Boston Celtics	478
FG%	Neil Johnston	Philadelphia Warriors	.447
FT%	Bill Sharman	Boston Celtics	.905

Note: Prior to the 1969–70 season, league leaders in points, rebounds, and assists were determined by totals rather than averages.

== NBA awards ==
- Most Valuable Player: Bob Cousy, Boston Celtics
- Rookie of the Year: Tom Heinsohn, Boston Celtics
- All-NBA First Team:
  - F – Paul Arizin, Philadelphia Warriors
  - F – Dolph Schayes, Syracuse Nationals
  - C – Bob Pettit, St. Louis Hawks
  - G – Bob Cousy, Boston Celtics
  - G – Bill Sharman, Boston Celtics
- All-NBA Second Team:
  - F – Maurice Stokes, Rochester Royals
  - F – George Yardley, Fort Wayne Pistons
  - C – Neil Johnston, Philadelphia Warriors
  - G – Dick Garmaker, Minneapolis Lakers
  - G – Slater Martin, St. Louis Hawks

== See also ==
- List of NBA regular season records
