= List of Philadelphia 76ers seasons =

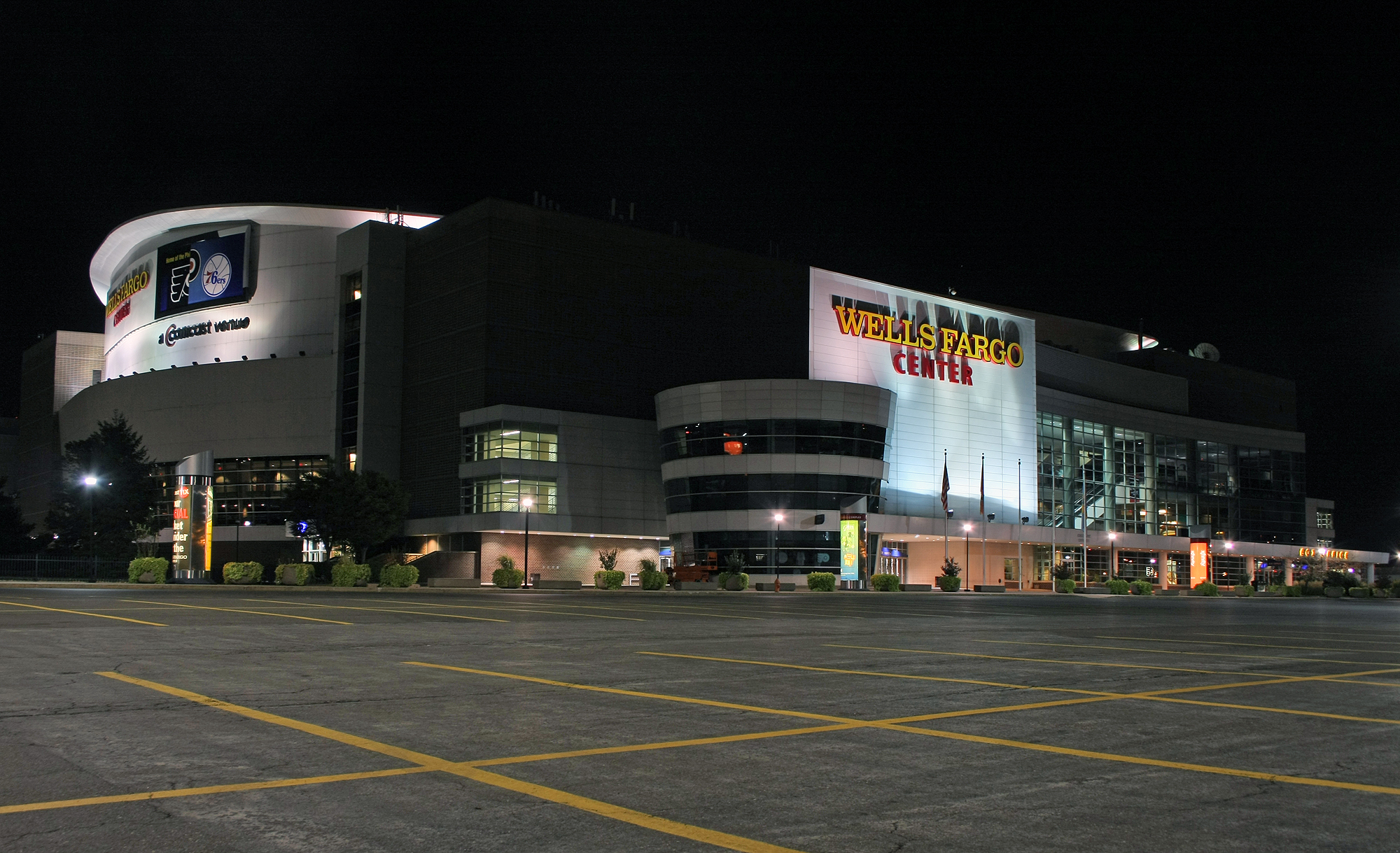
Exterior of the Xfinity Mobile Arena, the current home of the 76ers.

The Philadelphia 76ers are an American professional basketball team based in Philadelphia. The Sixers play in the Atlantic Division of the Eastern Conference in the National Basketball Association (NBA). In seventy complete NBA seasons, the franchise has played in the Finals nine times and won three championships. The Sixers have the third-highest victory total and third most playoff appearances in NBA history. Since 1996, the Sixers have played home games at Xfinity Mobile Arena.

In 1946, owner Danny Biasone founded the franchise as the Syracuse Nationals, a member of the National Basketball League (NBL). The Nationals qualified for the playoffs three times then joined the NBA in 1949, one of seven NBL teams to merge with the rival Basketball Association of America (BAA). The Nationals qualified for the playoffs in every season played in Syracuse, advancing to three Finals and winning their only title while in Syracuse in 1955. For the 1963–64 season, the year following the departure of the Philadelphia Warriors for San Francisco, the Syracuse Nationals relocated to Philadelphia as the 76ers.

The franchise has played 57 seasons as the Philadelphia 76ers, with 36 playoff appearances and two championships. The Sixers acquired Philadelphia-native Wilt Chamberlain in 1964 from the Warriors and defeated Chamberlain's former team in the 1967 Finals, but suffered a sharp fall from grace due to the loss of Chamberlain to retirement and Billy Cunningham to the ABA: in 1972–73 the team won only nine games, the fewest in an 82-game NBA season. Under coaches Gene Shue and Cunningham, and the on-court leadership of forward Julius Erving, the 76ers returned as a power quite rapidly, achieving winning records in all but one season from 1975–76 to 1990–91. The Sixers won their last title in 1983 against the Los Angeles Lakers, sweeping them in four games.

During the 1990s, the 76ers declined to an 18–64 record in 1995–96 before popular high-scoring guard Allen Iverson led the team back up the table. In 2000–01 the Iverson-led 76ers won fifty-six games and defeated the Milwaukee Bucks in the Eastern Conference finals to reach the 2001 Finals but lost to the Lakers four games to one in the best-of-seven series. The 76ers were a middle-of-the-road team on-court during the following dozen seasons, but by the early 2010s financial problems led incoming general manager Sam Hinkie to clean out any expensive players in order to save money and gain draft choices for the future. Lacking on-court talent, the 76ers set many records for ineptitude in the following three seasons, becoming the second NBA team after the 1995–96 to 1998–99 Grizzlies to suffer three consecutive seasons winning fewer than twenty games. In 2015–16 by going 10–72 the 76ers suffered the ignominy of having suffered the two all-time worst 82-game NBA season winning percentages. (Note: The 1992–93 Dallas Mavericks actually had a point differential of –15.2, and the 2011–12 Bobcats of –13.9, vis-à-vis the 1972–73 76ers –12.1 and 2015–16 76ers –10.2)

== Seasons ==
League champions	Conference champions	Division champions	Playoff berth

Season	Team	League	Conference	Finish	Division	Finish	W	L	Win%	GB	Playoffs	Awards	Head Coach
Syracuse Nationals
1946–47	1946–47	NBL	—	—	Eastern	4th	21	23	.477	10	Lost Opening Round (Royals) 3–1		Bennie Borgmann
1947–48	1947–48	NBL	—	—	Eastern	4th	24	36	.486	20	Lost Opening Round (Duffey Packers) 3–0		Bennie Borgmann
1948–49	1948–49	NBL	—	—	Eastern	2nd	40	23	.635	8.5	Won Opening Round (Calumet Buccaneers) 2–0; Lost Division semifinals (Duffey Packers) 3–1	Dolph Schayes (ROY); Al Cervi (COY)	Al Cervi
1949–50 (Note: Prior to the season, the National Basketball League (NBL) merged with the Basketball Association of America (BAA), creating the National Basketball Association (NBA).)	1949–50	NBA	—	—	Eastern	1st	51	13	.797	—	Won Division semifinals (Warriors) 2–0; Won Division finals (Knicks) 2–1; Lost NBA Finals (Lakers) 4–2		Al Cervi
1950–51	1950–51	NBA	—	—	Eastern	4th	32	34	.485	8	Won Division semifinals (Warriors) 2–0; Lost Division finals (Knicks) 3–2		Al Cervi
1951–52	1951–52	NBA	—	—	Eastern	1st	40	26	.606	—	Won Division semifinals (Warriors) 2–1; Lost Division finals (Knicks) 3–1		Al Cervi
1952–53	1952–53	NBA	—	—	Eastern	2nd	47	24	.662	0.5	Lost Division semifinals (Celtics) 2–0		Al Cervi
1953–54	1953–54	NBA	—	—	Eastern	T-2nd	42	30	.583	2	Advanced round-robin Division semifinals 4–0; Won Division finals (Celtics) 2–0; Lost NBA Finals (Lakers) 4–3		Al Cervi
1954–55	1954–55	NBA	—	—	Eastern	1st	43	29	.597	—	Won Division finals (Celtics) 3–1; Won NBA Finals (Pistons) 4–3		
1955–56	1955–56	NBA	—	—	Eastern	3rd	35	37	.486	10	Won Division Tiebreaker (Knicks) 1–0; Won Division semifinals (Celtics) 2–1; Lost Division finals (Warriors) 3–2		
1956–57	1956–57	NBA	—	—	Eastern	2nd	38	34	.528	6	Won Division semifinals (Warriors) 2–0; Lost Division finals (Celtics) 3–0		Al Cervi; Paul Seymour
1957–58	1957–58	NBA	—	—	Eastern	2nd	41	31	.569	8	Lost Division semifinals (Warriors) 2–1		Paul Seymour
1958–59	1958–59	NBA	—	—	Eastern	3rd	35	37	.486	17	Won Division semifinals (Knicks) 2–0; Lost Division finals (Celtics) 4–3		Paul Seymour
1959–60	1959–60	NBA	—	—	Eastern	3rd	45	30	.600	14	Lost Division semifinals (Warriors) 2–1		Paul Seymour
1960–61	1960–61	NBA	—	—	Eastern	3rd	38	41	.481	19	Won Division semifinals (Warriors) 3–0; Lost Division finals (Celtics) 4–1		Alex Hannum
1961–62	1961–62	NBA	—	—	Eastern	3rd	41	39	.513	19	Lost Division semifinals (Warriors) 3–2		Alex Hannum
1962–63	1962–63	NBA	—	—	Eastern	2nd	48	32	.600	10	Lost Division semifinals (Royals) 3–2		Alex Hannum
Philadelphia 76ers
1963–64	1963–64	NBA	—	—	Eastern	3rd	34	46	.425	25	Lost Division semifinals (Royals) 3–2		Dolph Schayes
1964–65	1964–65	NBA	—	—	Eastern	3rd	40	40	.500	22	Won Division semifinals (Royals) 3–1; Lost Division finals (Celtics) 4–3		Dolph Schayes
1965–66	1965–66	NBA	—	—	Eastern	1st	55	25	.688	—	Lost Division finals (Celtics) 4–1	Wilt Chamberlain (MVP); Dolph Schayes (COY)	Dolph Schayes
1966–67	1966–67	NBA	—	—	Eastern	1st	68	13	.840	—	Won Division semifinals (Royals) 3–1; Won Division finals (Celtics) 4–1; Won NBA Finals (Warriors) 4–2	Wilt Chamberlain (MVP)	Alex Hannum
1967–68	1967–68	NBA	—	—	Eastern	1st	62	20	.756	—	Won Division semifinals (Knicks) 4–2; Lost Division finals (Celtics) 4–3	Wilt Chamberlain (MVP); Hal Greer (ASG MVP)	Alex Hannum
1968–69	1968–69	NBA	—	—	Eastern	2nd	55	27	.671	2	Lost Division semifinals (Celtics) 4–1		Jack Ramsay
1969–70	1969–70	NBA	—	—	Eastern	4th	42	40	.512	18	Lost Division semifinals (Bucks) 4–1		Jack Ramsay
1970–71	1970–71	NBA	Eastern	3rd	Atlantic (Note: Conferences were introduced and Eastern Division was split into the Atlantic and Central divisions.)	2nd	47	35	.573	5	Lost conference semifinals (Bullets) 4–3		Jack Ramsay
1971–72	1971–72	NBA	Eastern	6th	Atlantic	3rd	30	52	.366	26	—		Jack Ramsay
1972–73	1972–73	NBA	Eastern	8th	Atlantic	4th	9	73	.110	59	—		Roy Rubin; Kevin Loughery
1973–74	1973–74	NBA	Eastern	8th	Atlantic	4th	25	57	.305	31	—		Gene Shue
1974–75	1974–75	NBA	Eastern	7th	Atlantic	4th	34	48	.415	26	—		Gene Shue
1975–76	1975–76	NBA	Eastern	4th	Atlantic	2nd	46	36	.561	8	Lost First round (Braves) 2–1		Gene Shue
1976–77	1976–77	NBA	Eastern	1st	Atlantic	1st	50	32	.610	—	Won conference semifinals (Celtics) 4–3; Won conference finals (Rockets) 4–2; Lost NBA Finals (Trail Blazers) 4–2	Julius Erving (ASG MVP)	Gene Shue
1977–78	1977–78	NBA	Eastern	1st	Atlantic	1st	55	27	.671	—	Won conference semifinals (Knicks) 4–0; Lost conference finals (Bullets) 4–2		Gene Shue; Billy Cunningham
1978–79	1978–79	NBA	Eastern	3rd	Atlantic	2nd	47	35	.573	7	Won First round (Nets) 2–0; Lost conference semifinals (Spurs) 4–3		Billy Cunningham
1979–80	1979–80	NBA	Eastern	3rd	Atlantic	2nd	59	23	.720	2	Won First round (Bullets) 2–0; Won conference semifinals (Hawks) 4–1; Won conference finals (Celtics) 4–1; Lost NBA Finals (Lakers) 4–2		Billy Cunningham
1980–81	1980–81	NBA	Eastern	3rd	Atlantic	2nd	62	20	.756	—	Won First round (Pacers) 2–0; Won conference semifinals (Bucks) 4–3; Lost conference finals (Celtics) 4–3	Julius Erving (MVP)	Billy Cunningham
1981–82	1981–82	NBA	Eastern	3rd	Atlantic	2nd	58	24	.707	5	Won First round (Hawks) 2–0; Won conference semifinals (Bucks) 4–2; Won conference finals (Celtics) 4–3; Lost NBA Finals (Lakers) 4–2		Billy Cunningham
1982–83	1982–83	NBA	Eastern	1st	Atlantic	1st	65	17	.793	—	Won conference semifinals (Knicks) 4–0; Won conference finals (Bucks) 4–1; Won NBA Finals (Lakers) 4–0	Moses Malone (MVP, FMVP); Bobby Jones (SIX); Julius Erving (ASG MVP, JWKC)	Billy Cunningham
1983–84	1983–84	NBA	Eastern	3rd	Atlantic	2nd	52	30	.634	10	Lost First round (Nets) 3–2		Billy Cunningham
1984–85	1984–85	NBA	Eastern	3rd	Atlantic	2nd	58	24	.707	5	Won First round (Bullets) 3–1; Won conference semifinals (Bucks) 4–0; Lost conference finals (Celtics) 4–1		Billy Cunningham
1985–86	1985–86	NBA	Eastern	3rd	Atlantic	2nd	54	28	.659	13	Won First round (Bullets) 3–2; Lost conference semifinals (Bucks) 4–3		Matt Guokas
1986–87	1986–87	NBA	Eastern	5th	Atlantic	2nd	45	37	.549	14	Lost First round (Bucks) 3–2		Matt Guokas
1987–88	1987–88	NBA	Eastern	10th	Atlantic	4th	36	46	.439	21	—		Matt Guokas; Jim Lynam
1988–89	1988–89	NBA	Eastern	7th	Atlantic	2nd	46	36	.561	6	Lost First round (Knicks) 3–0		Jim Lynam
1989–90	1989–90	NBA	Eastern	3rd	Atlantic	1st	53	29	.646	—	Won First round (Cavaliers) 3–2; Lost conference semifinals (Bulls) 4–1		Jim Lynam
1990–91	1990–91	NBA	Eastern	5th	Atlantic	2nd	44	38	.537	12	Won First round (Bucks) 3–0; Lost conference semifinals (Bulls) 4–1	Charles Barkley (ASG MVP)	Jim Lynam
1991–92	1991–92	NBA	Eastern	10th	Atlantic	5th	35	47	.427	16	—		Jim Lynam
1992–93	1992–93	NBA	Eastern	13th	Atlantic	6th	26	56	.317	34	—		Doug Moe; Fred Carter
1993–94	1993–94	NBA	Eastern	11th	Atlantic	6th	25	57	.305	32	—		Fred Carter
1994–95	1994–95	NBA	Eastern	13th	Atlantic	6th	24	58	.293	33	—	Dana Barros (MIP)	John Lucas II
1995–96	1995–96	NBA	Eastern	15th	Atlantic	7th	18	64	.220	42	—		John Lucas II
1996–97	1996–97	NBA	Eastern	14th	Atlantic	6th	22	60	.268	39	—	Allen Iverson (ROY)	Johnny Davis
1997–98	1997–98	NBA	Eastern	14th	Atlantic	7th	31	51	.378	24	—		Larry Brown
1998–99 (Note: Due to a lockout, the season did not start until February 5, 1999, and all 29 teams played a shortened 50-game regular season schedule.)	1998–99	NBA	Eastern	6th	Atlantic	3rd	28	22	.560	5	Won First round (Magic) 3–1; Lost conference semifinals (Pacers) 4–0		Larry Brown
1999–00	1999–00	NBA	Eastern	5th	Atlantic	3rd	49	33	.598	3	Won First round (Hornets) 3–1; Lost conference semifinals (Pacers) 4–2	Eric Snow (SPOR)	Larry Brown
2000–01	2000–01	NBA	Eastern	1st	Atlantic	1st	56	26	.683	—	Won First round (Pacers) 3–1; Won conference semifinals (Raptors) 4–3; Won conference finals (Bucks) 4–3; Lost NBA Finals (Lakers) 4–1	Allen Iverson (MVP, ASG MVP); Dikembe Mutombo (DPOY, JWKC); Aaron McKie (SIX); Larry Brown (COY)	Larry Brown
2001–02	2001–02	NBA	Eastern	6th	Atlantic	4th	43	39	.524	9	Lost First round (Celtics) 3–2		Larry Brown
2002–03	2002–03	NBA	Eastern	4th	Atlantic	2nd	48	34	.585	1	Won First round (Hornets) 4–2; Lost conference semifinals (Pistons) 4–2		Larry Brown
2003–04	2003–04	NBA	Eastern	11th	Atlantic	5th	33	49	.402	14	—		Randy Ayers; Chris Ford
2004–05	2004–05	NBA	Eastern	7th	Atlantic	2nd	43	39	.524	2	Lost First round (Pistons) 4–1	Allen Iverson (ASG MVP)	Jim O'Brien
2005–06	2005–06	NBA	Eastern	9th	Atlantic	2nd	38	44	.463	11	—		Maurice Cheeks
2006–07	2006–07	NBA	Eastern	9th	Atlantic	3rd	35	47	.427	12	—		Maurice Cheeks
2007–08	2007–08	NBA	Eastern	7th	Atlantic	3rd	40	42	.488	26	Lost First round (Pistons) 4–2		Maurice Cheeks
2008–09	2008–09	NBA	Eastern	6th	Atlantic	2nd	41	41	.500	21	Lost First round (Magic) 4–2		Maurice Cheeks; Tony DiLeo
2009–10	2009–10	NBA	Eastern	13th	Atlantic	4th	27	55	.329	23	—	Samuel Dalembert (JWKC)	Eddie Jordan
2010–11	2010–11	NBA	Eastern	7th	Atlantic	3rd	41	41	.500	15	Lost First round (Heat) 4–1		Doug Collins
2011–12 (Note: Due to a lockout, the season did not start until December 25, 2011, and all 30 teams played a shortened 66-game regular season schedule.)	2011–12	NBA	Eastern	8th	Atlantic	3rd	35	31	.530	4	Won First round (Bulls) 4–2; Lost conference semifinals (Celtics) 4–3		Doug Collins
2012–13	2012–13	NBA	Eastern	9th	Atlantic	4th	34	48	.415	20	—		Doug Collins
2013–14	2013–14	NBA	Eastern	14th	Atlantic	5th	19	63	.232	29	—	Michael Carter-Williams (ROY)	Brett Brown
2014–15	2014–15	NBA	Eastern	14th	Atlantic	4th	18	64	.220	31	—		Brett Brown
2015–16	2015–16	NBA	Eastern	15th	Atlantic	5th	10	72	.122	46	—		Brett Brown
2016–17	2016–17	NBA	Eastern	14th	Atlantic	4th	28	54	.341	25	—		Brett Brown
2017–18	2017–18	NBA	Eastern	3rd	Atlantic	3rd	52	30	.634	7	Won First round (Heat) 4–1; Lost conference semifinals (Celtics) 4–1	Ben Simmons (ROY)	Brett Brown
2018–19	2018–19	NBA	Eastern	3rd	Atlantic	2nd	51	31	.622	7	Won First round (Nets) 4–1; Lost conference semifinals (Raptors) 4–3		Brett Brown
2019–20 (Note: Due to the COVID-19 pandemic, the regular season was shortened and not all 30 teams played an equal number of games.)	2019–20	NBA	Eastern	6th	Atlantic	3rd	43	30	.589	10.5	Lost First round (Celtics) 4–0		Brett Brown
2020–21 (Note: Due to the COVID-19 pandemic, and the late finish for the 2019–20 season, all 30 teams played a shortened 72-game regular season schedule.)	2020–21	NBA	Eastern	1st	Atlantic	1st	49	23	.681	—	Won First round (Wizards) 4–1; Lost conference semifinals (Hawks) 4–3		Doc Rivers
2021–22	2021–22	NBA	Eastern	4th	Atlantic	2nd	51	31	.622	—	Won First round (Raptors) 4–2; Lost conference semifinals (Heat) 4–2		Doc Rivers
2022–23	2022–23	NBA	Eastern	3rd	Atlantic	2nd	54	28	.659	3	Won First round (Nets) 4–0; Lost conference semifinals (Celtics) 4–3	Joel Embiid (MVP)	Doc Rivers
2023–24	2023–24	NBA	Eastern	7th	Atlantic	3rd	47	35	.573	17	Lost First round (Knicks) 4–2	Tyrese Maxey (MIP, SPOR)	Nick Nurse
2024–25	2024–25	NBA	Eastern	13th	Atlantic	5th	24	58	.293	37	—		Nick Nurse
2025–26	2025–26	NBA	Eastern	7th	Atlantic	4th	45	37	.549	11	Won First round (Celtics) 4–3; Lost conference semifinals (Knicks) 4–0		Nick Nurse

== All-time records ==
=== NBA records ===
Statistic	Wins	Losses	Win%
Regular season record (1949–present)	3,170	2,945	.518
Post-season record (1949–present)	254	245	.509
All-time regular and post-season record	3,424	3,190	.518

=== NBL records ===
Statistic	Wins	Losses	Win%
Regular season record (1946–1949)	85	82	.509
Post-season record (1946–1949)	4	9	.308
All-time regular and post-season record	89	91	.494

== Sources ==
- NBA History, nba.com. NBA Media Ventures, LLC. Retrieved 2009-09-06.
- Philadelphia 76ers, basketball-reference.com. Sports Reference LLC. Retrieved 2009-09-06.
- Playoff Index, basketball-reference.com. Sports Reference LLC. Retrieved 2009-09-06.
