= Dick Farley (basketball) =

American basketball player (1932–1969)

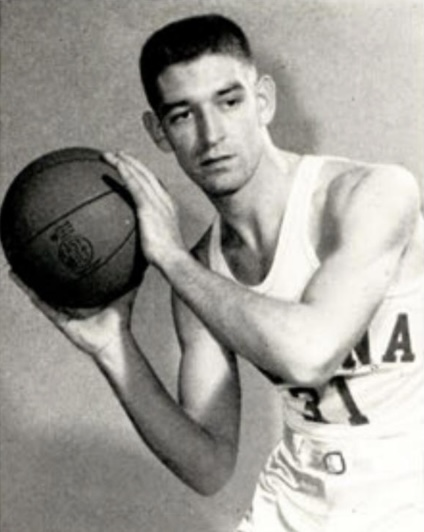
- Farley as a senior at Indiana

Personal information
- Born: April 13, 1932 Winslow, Indiana, U.S.
- Died: October 1, 1969 (aged 37) Fort Wayne, Indiana, U.S.
- Listed height: 6 ft 4 in (1.93 m)
- Listed weight: 190 lb (86 kg)

Career information
- High school: Winslow (Winslow, Indiana)
- College: Indiana (1951–1954)
- NBA draft: 1954: 2nd round, 15th overall pick
- Drafted by: Syracuse Nationals
- Playing career: 1954–1959
- Position: Shooting guard / small forward
- Number: 14, 12, 22

Career history
- 1954–1956: Syracuse Nationals
- 1958–1959: Detroit Pistons

Career highlights
- NBA champion (1955); NCAA champion (1953)

Career statistics
- Points: 1,378 (6.5 ppg)
- Rebounds: 527 (2.5 rpg)
- Assists: 386 (1.8 apg)
- Stats at NBA.com
- Stats at Basketball Reference

Richard L. Farley (April 13, 1932 – October 2, 1969) was an American professional basketball player.

A 6-foot-4-inch (1.93 m) swingman from Winslow, Indiana, Farley played for the 1953 Indiana University national championship team. He also played three seasons (1954–1956; 1958–1959) in the National Basketball Association as a member of the Syracuse Nationals and Detroit Pistons. He averaged 6.5 points per game in his career and won a league title with Syracuse in 1955.

Farley previously held the NBA record for the shortest amount of time on the floor before fouling out in a game, with five minutes' playing time, set on March 12, 1956. The record stood for 41 years until the Dallas Mavericks' Bubba Wells broke it by getting himself disqualified in just 3 minutes on December 29, 1997.

Farley died of cancer on October 2, 1969.

== Career statistics ==
Legend
GP	Games played	GS	Games started	MPG	Minutes per game
FG%	Field goal percentage	3P%	3-point field goal percentage	FT%	Free throw percentage
RPG	Rebounds per game	APG	Assists per game	SPG	Steals per game
BPG	Blocks per game	PPG	Points per game	**Bold**	Career high
†	Won an NBA championship	*	Led the league

=== NBA ===
==== Regular season ====
Year	Team	GP	MPG	FG%	FT%	RPG	APG	PPG
1954–55†	Syracuse	69	16.1	.385	.677	2.4	1.6	5.9
1955–56	Syracuse	**72**	**19.8**	.373	.691	2.3	**2.1**	6.7
1958–59	Detroit	70	18.3	**.393**	**.737**	**2.8**	1.8	**7.0**
Career		211	18.1	.384	.700	2.5	1.8	6.7

==== Playoffs ====
Year	Team	GP	MPG	FG%	FT%	RPG	APG	PPG
1955†	Syracuse	**11***	15.3	.339	.560	1.2	1.8	4.7
1956	Syracuse	8	**21.1**	**.472**	.613	**2.6**	**3.5**	**10.1**
1959	Detroit	3	11.0	.417	**1.000**	2.0	1.0	3.7
Career		22	16.8	.414	.596	1.8	2.3	6.8
