= Jim Tucker (basketball) =

American basketball player (1932–2020)

Personal information
- Born: December 11, 1932 Paris, Kentucky, U.S.
- Died: May 14, 2020 (aged 87) Jacksonville, Florida, U.S.
- Listed height: 6 ft 7 in (2.01 m)
- Listed weight: 185 lb (84 kg)

Career information
- High school: Paris Western (Paris, Kentucky)
- College: Duquesne (1951–1954)
- NBA draft: 1954: 3rd round, 24th overall pick
- Drafted by: Syracuse Nationals
- Playing career: 1954–1960
- Position: Power forward
- Number: 14, 17

Career history
- 1954–1957: Syracuse Nationals
- 1954–1955: Wilkes-Barre Barons
- 1954–1955: Hazleton Pros
- 1958–1959: Allentown Jets
- 1958–1959: Baltimore Bullets
- 1959–1960: Easton Madisons

Career highlights
- NBA champion (1955); EPBL champion (1960); Second-team All-American – INS (1952); Third-team All-American – UPI (1952)

Career statistics
- Points: 407 (4.1 ppg)
- Rebounds: 349 (3.5 rpg)
- Assists: 52 (.5 apg)
- Stats at NBA.com
- Stats at Basketball Reference

James D. Tucker (December 11, 1932 – May 14, 2020) was an American professional basketball player.

== Biography ==
Tucker attended Paris Western High School in Paris, Kentucky. A 6' 7" forward from Duquesne University, Tucker played three seasons (1954–1957) in the National Basketball Association (NBA) as a member of the Syracuse Nationals. He averaged 4.1 points per game in his career and won a league championship in 1955.

Tucker and teammate Earl Lloyd were also the first two African Americans to play on an NBA championship team.

After the NBA he played with the Harlem Magicians. He played in the Eastern Professional Basketball League (EPBL) for the Allentown Jets, Baltimore Bullets and the Easton Madisons from 1958 to 1960. Tucker won an EPBL championship with the Madisons in 1960.

In 2018, a short documentary titled "Let 'Em Know You're There" told the story of Jim's professional basketball career and eventual battle with Alzheimer's disease. The documentary won a 2019 Mid-Atlantic Emmy.

Tucker died on May 14, 2020, from complications from Alzheimer's disease at age 87.

== Career statistics ==
Legend
| GP | Games played | GS | Games started | MPG | Minutes per game |
| FG% | Field goal percentage | 3P% | 3-point field goal percentage | FT% | Free throw percentage |
| RPG | Rebounds per game | APG | Assists per game | SPG | Steals per game |
| BPG | Blocks per game | PPG | Points per game | **Bold** | Career high |
| † | Won an NBA championship |

=== NBA ===
==== Regular season ====
| Year | Team | GP | MPG | FG% | FT% | RPG | APG | PPG |
|---|---|---|---|---|---|---|---|---|
| 1954–55† | Syracuse | 20 | **14.4** | .336 | .711 | **4.9** | **.6** | **5.3** |
| 1955–56 | Syracuse | **70** | 12.8 | .348 | **.795** | 3.3 | .5 | 3.8 |
| 1956–57 | Syracuse | 9 | 13.2 | **.386** | .000 | 2.2 | .0 | 3.9 |
| Career | | 99 | 13.1 | .349 | .762 | 3.5 | .5 | 4.1 |

==== Playoffs ====
| Year | Team | GP | MPG | FG% | FT% | RPG | APG | PPG |
|---|---|---|---|---|---|---|---|---|
| 1955† | Syracuse | **9** | 6.6 | .296 | **.889** | 1.7 | .1 | 2.7 |
| 1956 | Syracuse | 6 | **12.0** | **.382** | .750 | **4.2** | **.3** | **5.3** |
| Career | | 15 | 8.7 | .344 | .824 | 2.7 | .2 | 3.7 |
