= List of Philadelphia 76ers head coaches =

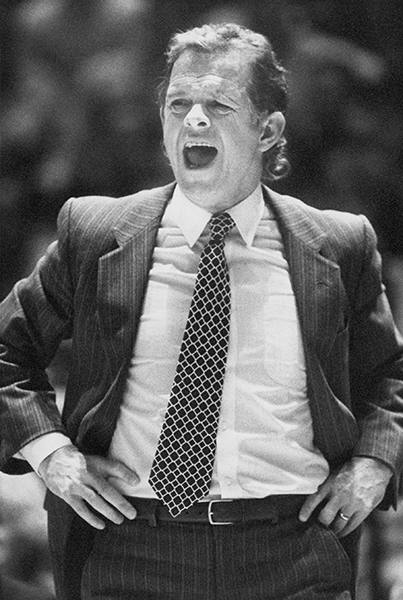
Philadelphia 76ers head coach Jim Lynam in 1990

The Philadelphia 76ers are an American professional basketball team based in Philadelphia,. They are a member of the Atlantic Division of the Eastern Conference in the National Basketball Association (NBA). Formerly known as the Syracuse Nationals, the 76ers joined the NBA when it was founded in 1949. The Nationals had a record of 51–13 in their first NBA season under coach Al Cervi and won the Eastern Division crown. The franchise were purchased by Philadelphian Irv Kosloff and Ike Richma in the spring of 1963; the NBA approved their franchise shift on May 22 and name change to the Philadelphia 76ers on August 6. This brought professional basketball back to the city, which had been without a team since the Golden State Warriors left Philadelphia in 1962. After coaching the 76ers since 2010, Doug Collins resigned as head coach on April 18, 2013, following the 2012–13 season. Brett Brown was hired to be the head coach of the 76ers on August 15, 2013, prior to the start of the 2013–14 season. Brown was released as head coach after a 4–0 loss to the Celtics in the 2020 playoffs. On October 3, 2020 Doc Rivers was announced as his replacement.

There have been 24 head coaches for the Philadelphia 76ers franchise. The franchise won their first NBA championship as the Syracuse Nationals in the 1955 NBA Finals under coach Cervi. Their second title was won as the Philadelphia 76ers in 1967, coached by Alex Hannum, who has the highest career winning percentage for the 76ers. Billy Cunningham, who played and coached with the 76ers for 17 years, is the franchise's all-time leader in both regular season and playoff games coached and wins. He coached the team to their most recent title in 1983.

Hannum, Jack Ramsay, and Larry Brown are the only members of the franchise to have been inducted into the Basketball Hall of Fame as coaches. Cervi, Paul Seymour, and Kevin Loughery served as a player-coaches, and Cervi, after retiring as a player, continued to coach the team for the rest of the season that he retired during and five additional seasons. Six other former players, Hannum, Dolph Schayes, Cunningham, Matt Guokas, Fred Carter, and Maurice Cheeks went on to coach for the franchise.

== Key ==
GC	Games coached
W	Wins
L	Losses
Win%	Winning percentage
#	Number of coaches^{[a]}
*	Spent entire NBA head coaching career with the Nationals/76ers
†	Elected into the Basketball Hall of Fame as a coach

== Coaches ==
Note: Statistics are correct through the end of the 2025–26 season. The list does not include NBL seasons.

#	Name	Term^{[b]}	GC	W	L	Win%	GC	W	L	Win%	Achievements	Reference
#	Name	Term^{[b]}	Regular season				Playoffs				Achievements	Reference
Syracuse Nationals
1	Al Cervi^^{[c]}	1949–1953 (as player-coach); 1953–1956	495	294	201	.594	60	34	26	.567	1 championship (1955)	
2	Paul Seymour^{[d]}	1956–1960 (as player-coach)	279	155	124	.556	20	9	11	.450		
3	Alex Hannum†	1960–1963	239	127	112	.531	18	8	10	.444		
Philadelphia 76ers
4	Dolph Schayes^{[e]}	1963–1964 (as player-coach); 1964–1966	240	129	111	.538	21	9	12	.429	1965–66 NBA Coach of the Year	
—	Alex Hannum†	1966–1968	163	130	33	.798	28	18	10	.643	1 championship (1967)	
5	Jack Ramsay†	1968–1972	328	174	154	.530	17	5	12	.294	One of the top 10 coaches in NBA history	
6	Roy Rubin*	1972–1973	51	4	47	.078	—	—	—	—		
7	Kevin Loughery^{[f]}	1973 (as player-coach)	31	5	26	.161	—	—	—	—		
8	Gene Shue	1973–1977	334	157	177	.470	22	11	11	.500		
9	Billy Cunningham*	1977–1985	650	454	196	.698	105	66	39	.629	1 championship (1983)	
10	Matt Guokas	1985–1988	207	119	88	.575	17	8	9	.471		
11	Jim Lynam	1988–1992	367	194	173	.529	21	8	13	.381		
12	Doug Moe	1992–1993	56	19	37	.339	—	—	—	—		
13	Fred Carter*	1993–1994	108	32	76	.296	—	—	—	—		
14	John Lucas	1994–1996	164	42	122	.256	—	—	—	—		
15	Johnny Davis	1996–1997	82	22	60	.268	—	—	—	—		
16	Larry Brown†	1997–2003	460	255	205	.554	58	28	30	.483	2000–01 NBA Coach of the Year	
17	Randy Ayers	2003–2004	52	21	31	.404	—	—	—	—		
18	Chris Ford	2004	30	12	18	.400	—	—	—	—		
19	Jim O'Brien	2004–2005	82	43	39	.524	5	1	4	.200		
20	Maurice Cheeks	2005–2008	269	122	146	.455	6	2	4	.333		
21	Tony DiLeo	2008–2009	59	32	27	.542	6	2	4	.333		
22	Eddie Jordan	2009–2010	82	27	55	.329	—	—	—	—		
23	Doug Collins	2010–2013	230	110	120	.478	18	8	10	.444		
24	Brett Brown*	2013–2020	565	221	344	.391	26	12	14	.462		
25	Doc Rivers	2020–2023	236	154	82	.653	35	20	15	.571		
26	Nick Nurse	2023–present	164	116	130	.472	17	6	11	.353		

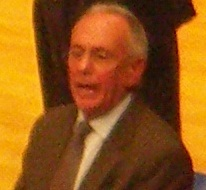
Larry Brown was the Philadelphia 76ers head coach for 518 games from 1997–2003, including one trip to the NBA Finals in 2001.

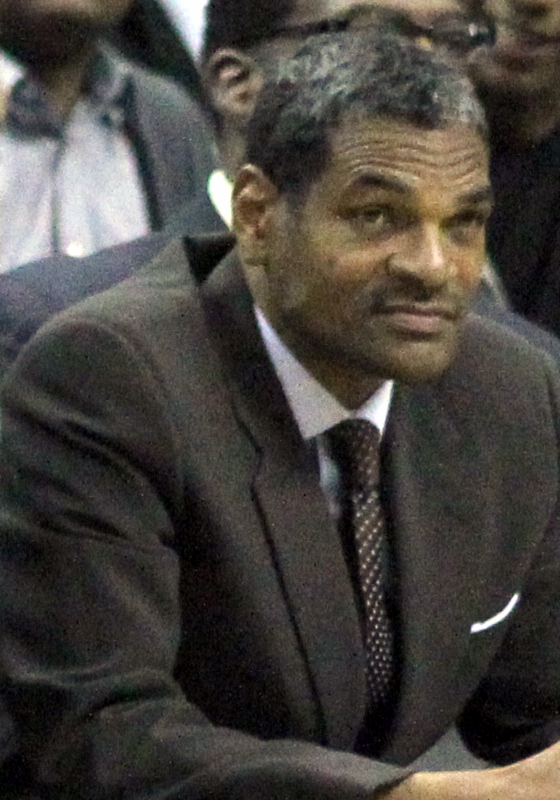
Maurice Cheeks was the head coach for 252 games from 2005–2008.

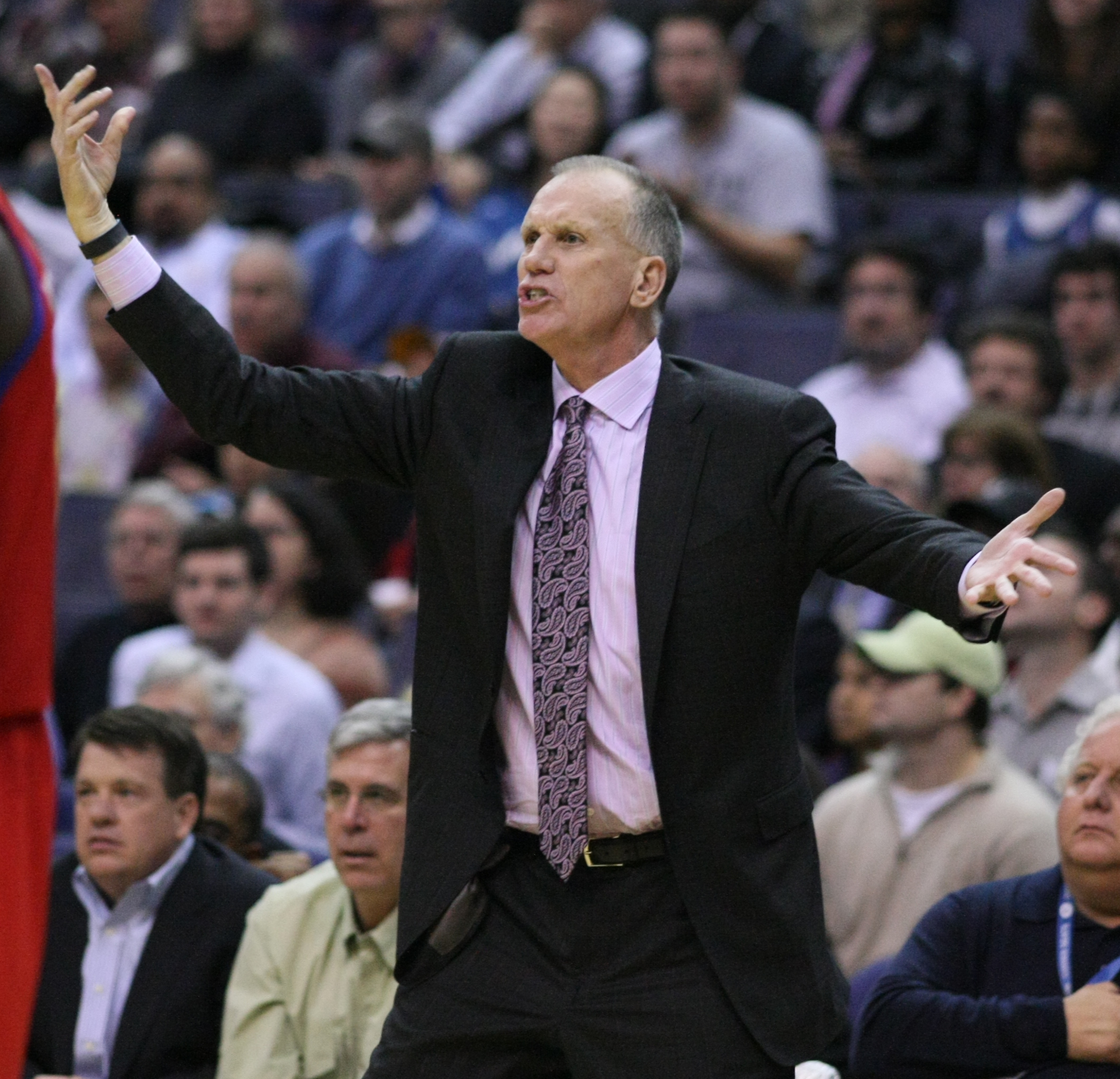
Doug Collins was the head coach for 248 games from 2010–2013.

== Notes ==
- ^{a} A running total of the number of coaches of the Nationals/76ers. Thus, any coach who has two separate terms as head coach is only counted once.
- ^{b} Each year is linked to an article about that particular NBA season.
- ^{c} Cervi served as a player-coach during part of his tenure with the Nationals. He player-coached for 279 games during four of his six seasons.
- ^{d} Seymour served as a player-coach during part of his tenure with the Nationals. He player-coached for 202 games during his first four seasons.
- ^{e} Schayes served as a player-coach during part of his tenure with the 76ers. He player-coached for 24 games during the 1963–64 season.
- ^{f} Loughery served as a player-coach during his entire tenure with the 76ers.
