= George King (basketball, born 1928) =

American basketball player and coach

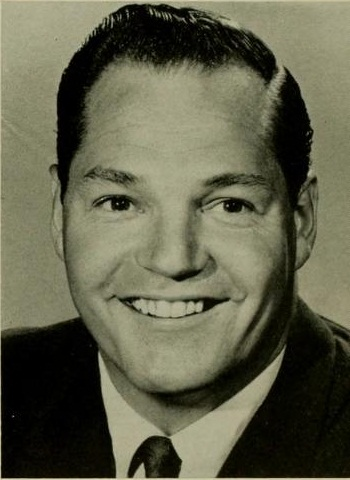
- King from The Monticola, 1962

Personal information
- Born: August 16, 1928 Charleston, West Virginia, U.S.
- Died: October 5, 2006 (aged 78) Naples, Florida, U.S.
- Listed height: 6 ft 0 in (1.83 m)
- Listed weight: 175 lb (79 kg)

Career information
- High school: Stonewall Jackson (Charleston, West Virginia)
- College: Charleston (1946–1950)
- NBA draft: 1950: 8th round, 89th overall pick
- Drafted by: Chicago Stags
- Playing career: 1951–1958
- Position: Guard
- Number: 3, 15
- Coaching career: 1957–1972

Career history

Playing
- 1950–1951: Phillips 66ers
- 1951–1956: Syracuse Nationals
- 1957–1958: Cincinnati Royals

Coaching
- 1957: Morris Harvey
- 1958–1960: West Virginia (assistant)
- 1961–1965: West Virginia
- 1966–1972: Purdue

Career highlights
- NBA champion (1955); 2x West Virginia's Amateur Athlete of the Year (1949, 1950)

Career statistics
- Points: 4,219 (10.3 ppg)
- Rebounds: 1,606 (3.9 rpg)
- Assists: 1,958 (4.8 apg)
- Stats at NBA.com
- Stats at Basketball Reference

Other information
- Coaching career

Administrative career (AD unless noted)
- 1971–1992: Purdue

George Smith King Jr. (August 16, 1928 – October 5, 2006) was an American professional basketball player and collegiate coach. He was born in Charleston, West Virginia.

== College career ==
George King attended Morris Harvey College (now the University of Charleston), where he led his team to four NCAA championship tournaments. He averaged 31.2 points per game in 1950 and scored a total of 2,535 points in 117 games in his college career. He received his A.B. degree in physical education in 1950. In both his junior and senior years, he was named West Virginia's Amateur Athlete of the Year.

== Professional career ==
George King was picked in the 8th round of the 1950 NBA draft. He played for the Bartlesville Phillips 66ers in 1950–1951.

In 1955, King led the Syracuse Nationals to the Finals, where he hit the series-clinching free throw in Game 7 and had a key steal to win the championship. After five seasons with the Nationals, he spent his last season in the NBA with the Cincinnati Royals. He holds career averages of 10.3 points, 3.9 rebounds and 4.8 assists a game in six seasons.

In 1956, King toured eleven Middle East countries with the Nationals for the Educational Exchange Service of the State Department. A year later, he became the first American to give basketball coaching clinics in Africa.

== College coaching career ==
=== Morris Harvey College ===
After his tenure with the Nationals, King spent a season coaching college basketball at his alma mater, Morris Harvey, before returning for his last season in the NBA with the Royals.

=== West Virginia ===
George King began his coaching career at West Virginia University as an assistant under head coach Fred Schaus. In 1961, he became the head coach after Schaus left for the chance to coach the Los Angeles Lakers. He coached the Mountaineers with an overall record of 102–43 and led them to three Southern Conference tournament championships and three NCAA tournaments.

Before King began his coaching career, he received his master's degree in physical education at WVU in 1957 (before he ended his NBA career).

=== Purdue ===
King moved on to coaching at Purdue University, located in West Lafayette, Indiana, where he took over for Ray Eddy at the head coaching position. During his tenure, he compiled a 109–64 record. In 1969, he led the Boilermakers to their first Big Ten Championship in 29 years, and the first postseason appearance in school history. They made the most of it, advancing all the way to the NCAA title game, losing to John Wooden's UCLA. In that 1968–69 season, Purdue led the nation with 94.8 points a game on a team that consisted of notable players such as Rick Mount and Billy Keller. He was succeeded by his predecessor at West Virginia, Fred Schaus. He served as the school's athletic director from then on until 1992.

For the next 21 years as Purdue's seventh athletics director, King directed the Boilermaker program through a period of tremendous growth and change. He oversaw the emergence of women's athletics at the varsity level at Purdue in 1976–77. Extremely revered by his peers in the profession, King served as President of the National Association of Collegiate Directors of Athletics (NACDA), and chairperson of the NCAA's prestigious Committee on Committees and the NCAA Postseason Bowl (now known as Special Events) committee.
He was one of the youngest AD's in the nation and was the only one who also coached in the 1971–72 season. King is a member of both the Purdue and the University of Charleston Athletic Halls of Fame.

== Later years and death ==
King received an honorary doctorate from the renamed University of Charleston in 1983, when he was also named recipient of a Distinguished Alumni Award. He was named to the prestigious Honors Committee of the National Basketball Hall of Fame in Springfield, Massachusetts, in 1982, and to the University of Charleston Athletic Hall of Fame in 1985. He also was honored as the recipient of NACDA's 1990 James J. Corbett Memorial Award.

King retired from Purdue in 1992 and was named to the school's Hall of Fame in 2001.

King died at the age of 78 at the Hospice of Naples in Naples, Florida, around 11:30 a.m. of October 5, 2006, surrounded by his family. He is survived by his spouse of 57 years, Jeanne G. King; children George, Kristy Jeanne, Kathy Jan, Kerry Jo and Gordon Scott; 18 grandchildren; nine great-grandchildren; many nieces and nephews; and two sisters.

== Career statistics ==
=== Playing ===
Legend
GP	Games played	GS	Games started	MPG	Minutes per game
FG%	Field goal percentage	3P%	3-point field goal percentage	FT%	Free throw percentage
RPG	Rebounds per game	APG	Assists per game	SPG	Steals per game
BPG	Blocks per game	PPG	Points per game	**Bold**	Career high
†	Won an NBA championship	*	Led the league

==== NBA ====
===== Regular season =====
Year	Team	GP	MPG	FG%	FT%	RPG	APG	PPG
1951–52	Syracuse	66*	28.6	**.406**	**.712**	4.2	3.7	10.0
1952–53	Syracuse	71	35.5	.402	.643	4.0	5.1	11.2
1953–54	Syracuse	**72**	32.9	.376	.627	3.7	3.8	**11.3**
1954–55†	Syracuse	67	30.1	.377	.611	3.4	4.9	8.9
1955–56	Syracuse	**72**	32.5	.372	.640	3.5	**5.7**	10.3
1957–58	Cincinnati	63	**36.1**	.364	.617	**4.9**	5.3	9.7
Career		411	32.6	.382	.642	3.9	4.8	10.3

===== Playoffs =====
Year	Team	GP	MPG	FG%	FT%	RPG	APG	PPG
1952	Syracuse	6	34.5	.352	.679	4.8	3.9	9.5
1953	Syracuse	2	33.5	**.462**	**.833**	2.5	4.5	11.0
1954	Syracuse	10	28.6	.403	.603	2.2	2.1	8.8
1955†	Syracuse	**11***	33.7	.393	.636	3.7	5.6	11.5
1956	Syracuse	8	**39.6**	.361	.792	**5.9**	**7.5**	**14.2**
1958	Cincinnati	2	39.5	.250	.667	2.5	3.5	9.0
Career		39	34.0	.372	.679	3.8	4.6	11.0

=== Head coaching record ===
Record table
Season	Team	Overall	Conference	Standing	Postseason
**Morris Harvey Golden Eagles** (West Virginia Intercollegiate Athletic Conference) (1956–1957)
1956–57	Morris Harvey	12–12	8–7	7th	
Morris Harvey:		12–12 (.500)	8–7 (.533)		
**West Virginia Mountaineers** (Southern Conference) (1960–1965)
1960–61	West Virginia	23–4	11–1	1st	
1961–62	West Virginia	24–6	12–1	1st	NCAA University Division First Round
1962–63	West Virginia	23–8	11–2	1st	NCAA University Division Regional Third Place
1963–64	West Virginia	18–10	11–3	2nd	
1964–65	West Virginia	14–15	8–6	4th	NCAA University Division First Round
West Virginia:		102–43 (.703)	53–13 (.803)		
**Purdue Boilermakers** (Big Ten Conference) (1965–1972)
1965–66	Purdue	8–16	4–10	T–9th	
1966–67	Purdue	15–9	7–7	T–5th	
1967–68	Purdue	15–9	9–5	3rd	
1968–69	Purdue	23–5	13–1	1st	NCAA University Division Runner-up
1969–70	Purdue	18–6	11–3	2nd	
1970–71	Purdue	18–7	11–3	3rd	NIT First Round
1971–72	Purdue	12–12	6–8	T–5th	
Purdue:		109–64 (.630)	61–37 (.622)		
Total:		223–119 (.652)			
National champion Postseason invitational champion Conference regular season champion Conference regular season and conference tournament champion Division regular season champion Division regular season and conference tournament champion Conference tournament champion

== See also ==
- List of NCAA Division I Men's Final Four appearances by coach
