= Bill Kenville =

American basketball player (1930–2018)

Personal information
- Born: December 1, 1930 Elmhurst, New York, U.S.
- Died: June 19, 2018 (aged 87) Binghamton, New York, U.S.
- Listed height: 6 ft 2 in (1.88 m)
- Listed weight: 187 lb (85 kg)

Career information
- College: St. Bonaventure (1950–1953)
- NBA draft: 1953: 3rd round, 22nd overall pick
- Drafted by: Syracuse Nationals
- Playing career: 1953–1960
- Position: Point guard / shooting guard
- Number: 15, 14, 6, 10

Career history
- 1954–1956: Syracuse Nationals
- 1956–1960: Fort Wayne / Detroit Pistons

Career highlights
- NBA champion (1955)

Career statistics
- Points: 2,434 (7.1 ppg)
- Rebounds: 1,206 (3.5 rpg)
- Assists: 715 (2.1 apg)
- Stats at NBA.com
- Stats at Basketball Reference

William McGill Kenville (December 1, 1930 – June 19, 2018) was an American professional basketball player born from Elmhurst, New York.

A 6-foot-2-inch (1.88 m) guard from St. Bonaventure University, Kenville played six seasons (1953–1958; 1959–1960) in the National Basketball Association as a member of the Syracuse Nationals and Fort Wayne/Detroit Pistons. He averaged 7.1 points per game and won a league title with Syracuse in 1955.

== Career statistics ==
Legend
| GP | Games played | GS | Games started | MPG | Minutes per game |
| FG% | Field goal percentage | 3P% | 3-point field goal percentage | FT% | Free throw percentage |
| RPG | Rebounds per game | APG | Assists per game | SPG | Steals per game |
| BPG | Blocks per game | PPG | Points per game | **Bold** | Career high |
| † | Won an NBA championship | * | Led the league |

=== NBA ===
==== Regular season ====
| Year | Team | GP | MPG | FG% | FT% | RPG | APG | PPG |
|---|---|---|---|---|---|---|---|---|
| 1953–54 | Syracuse | **72** | 19.5 | **.384** | .747 | 3.4 | 1.7 | 6.0 |
| 1954–55† | Syracuse | 70 | 19.7 | .357 | .766 | 3.5 | 2.1 | 7.1 |
| 1955–56 | Syracuse | **72** | 17.8 | .379 | .759 | 3.0 | 2.2 | 7.4 |
| 1956–57 | Fort Wayne | 71 | **24.0** | .336 | .798 | **4.6** | **2.4** | **8.2** |
| 1957–58 | Detroit | 35 | 18.5 | .379 | .613 | 2.9 | 1.9 | 7.4 |
| 1959–60 | Detroit | 25 | 14.6 | .359 | **.805** | 2.8 | 1.8 | 5.1 |
| Career | | 345 | 19.6 | .363 | .758 | 3.5 | 2.1 | 7.1 |

==== Playoffs ====
| Year | Team | GP | MPG | FG% | FT% | RPG | APG | PPG |
|---|---|---|---|---|---|---|---|---|
| 1954 | Syracuse | **13*** | **28.8** | **.486** | .710 | **3.7** | 1.9 | **8.9** |
| 1955† | Syracuse | 11* | 11.8 | .354 | **.735** | 2.8 | 1.0 | 6.4 |
| 1956 | Syracuse | 8 | 16.0 | .356 | .696 | 2.1 | 1.8 | 6.0 |
| 1957 | Fort Wayne | 2 | 15.0 | .154 | .000 | .5 | **2.5** | 2.0 |
| 1958 | Detroit | 7 | 14.1 | .409 | .556 | 2.7 | .7 | 6.6 |
| Career | | 41 | 18.6 | .397 | .693 | 2.8 | 1.5 | 6.9 |
