= Earl Lloyd =

American basketball player and coach (1928–2015)

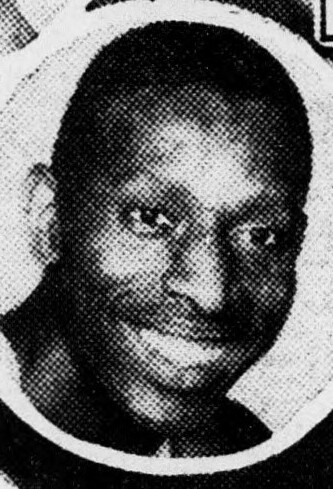
- Lloyd circa 1950

Personal information
- Born: April 3, 1928 Alexandria, Virginia, U.S.
- Died: February 26, 2015 (aged 86) Crossville, Tennessee, U.S.
- Listed height: 6 ft 6 in (1.98 m)
- Listed weight: 200 lb (91 kg)

Career information
- High school: Parker-Gray (Alexandria, Virginia)
- College: West Virginia State (1946–1950)
- NBA draft: 1950: 9th round, 100th overall pick
- Drafted by: Washington Capitols
- Playing career: 1950–1960
- Position: Small forward
- Number: 18, 11, 8, 17
- Coaching career: 1971–1972

Career history

Playing
- 1950–1951: Washington Capitols
- 1952–1958: Syracuse Nationals
- 1958–1960: Detroit Pistons

Coaching
- 1971–1972: Detroit Pistons

Career highlights
- NBA champion (1955); CIAA "Player of the Decade" for the 1940s; NAIA Silver and Golden Anniversary Teams

Career statistics
- Points: 4,682 (8.4 ppg)
- Rebounds: 3,609 (6.4 rpg)
- Assists: 810 (1.4 apg)
- Stats at NBA.com
- Stats at Basketball Reference
- Basketball Hall of Fame

Earl Francis Lloyd (April 3, 1928 – February 26, 2015) was an American professional basketball player and coach. He was the first African American player to play a game in the National Basketball Association (NBA).

An All-American player at West Virginia State University, Lloyd helped lead West Virginia State to an undefeated season in 1948. As a professional, Lloyd helped lead the Syracuse Nationals to the 1955 NBA Championship. In 1971, Lloyd was hired by the Detroit Pistons as head coach, becoming the first non-playing black head coach of the NBA and fourth overall black head coach in NBA history. Lloyd was inducted into the Naismith Basketball Hall of Fame in 2003.

== Early life ==
Earl Lloyd was born in Alexandria, Virginia, on April 3, 1928, to Theodore Lloyd Sr. and Daisy Lloyd. His father worked in the coal industry and his mother was a stay-at-home mom. Being a high school standout, Lloyd was named to the All-South Atlantic Conference three times and the All-State Virginia Interscholastic Conference twice. Lloyd did attend a segregated school but gives gratitude to his family and educators for helping him through the tough times and his success after school.

Lloyd was a 1946 graduate of Parker–Gray High where he played for Coach Louis Randolph Johnson. He received a scholarship to play basketball at West Virginia State University, home of the Yellow Jackets. In school he was nicknamed "Moon Fixer" because of his size and was known as a defensive specialist.

== College career ==
Lloyd led West Virginia State to two Central Intercollegiate Athletic Association (CIAA) Conference and Tournament Championships in 1948 and 1949. He was named All–Conference three times (1948–50) and was All-American twice, as named by the Pittsburgh Courier (1949–50). As a senior, he averaged 14 points and 8 rebounds per game, while leading West Virginia State to a second–place finish in the CIAA Conference and Tournament Championship. In 1947–48, West Virginia State was the only undefeated team in the United States, with a 30–0 record. Lloyd graduated from WVSU with his B.S. degree in physical education in 1950.

== Harlem Globetrotter ==
Prior to being drafted in the ninth round of the 1950 NBA draft, Lloyd starred in the lineup of the Harlem Globetrotters. Lloyd led the team to two wins over the reigning Minneapolis Lakers; this proved his talents beyond his race. Except for racial segregation, he was one of the finest artists of his time. Lloyd's talents were recognized amongst other black teammates, the two being Chuck Cooper and Nathaniel (Nat) "Sweetwater" Clifton. All three would go on to be drafted by the NBA, Clifton in 1950, Cooper in 1950, and Lloyd in 1950, the 100th overall pick.

== NBA career ==
Lloyd was drafted in the 9th round with pick #100 by the Washington Capitols in the 1950 NBA draft. Nicknamed "The Big Cat", Lloyd was one of three black players to enter the NBA at the same time. It was because of the order in which the team's season openers fell that Lloyd was the first to actually play in a game in the NBA, scoring six points on Halloween night. The date was October 31, 1950, one day ahead of Chuck Cooper of the Boston Celtics and four days before Nat "Sweetwater" Clifton of the New York Knicks.

Lloyd played in over 560 games in nine seasons. The 6-foot-5, 225-pound forward played in only seven games for the Washington Capitols before the team folded on January 9, 1951. He was then drafted into the U.S. Army at Fort Sill, Oklahoma. While fulfilling his military duty, the Syracuse Nationals picked him up on waivers. Lloyd served time fighting in the Korean War before coming back to basketball in 1952. In the 1953–54 season, Lloyd led the NBA in both personal fouls and disqualifications.

In 1954–1955, Lloyd averaged career highs of 10.2 points and 7.7 rebounds for Syracuse, which beat the Fort Wayne Pistons 4 games to 3 to win the 1955 NBA Championship. Lloyd and Jim Tucker became the first African Americans to play on an NBA championship team. Lloyd spent six seasons with Syracuse and two with the Detroit Pistons before retiring in 1961.

Regarding the racism black players faced in the early years of the NBA, Lloyd recalled being refused service multiple times and an incident where a fan in Indiana spit on him. He even went as far as to detail a time in which he was told to "go back" to Africa, and a plethora of times racial slurs were used towards him. However, Lloyd persevered and said that these instances only pushed him and made him play harder. Saying he didn't encounter racial animosity from teammates or opposing players, Lloyd said of fans' antics, “My philosophy was: If they weren’t calling you names, you weren’t doing nothing. If they’re calling you names, you were hurting them.”

"In 1950, basketball was like a babe in the woods; it didn't enjoy the notoriety that baseball enjoyed," Lloyd once said. "I don't think my situation was anything like Jackie Robinson's—a guy who played in a hostile environment, where some of his teammates didn't want him around. In basketball, folks were used to seeing integrated college teams. There was a different mentality."

"He's an unsung star. Anybody can score. Lloyd was an excellent defensive player. That was No. 1 on my roster", said his Syracuse coach Al Cervi.

In his NBA career with the Washington Capitols (1950–1951), Syracuse Nationals (1952–1958) and Detroit Pistons (1958–1960), Earl averaged 8.4 points, 6.4 rebounds and 1.4 assists in 560 games over nine seasons.

== Coaching and scouting ==
According to Detroit News sportswriter Jerry Green, in 1965 Detroit Pistons general manager Don Wattrick wanted to hire Lloyd as the team's head coach. Dave DeBusschere was instead named Pistons player–coach. Lloyd was the first African American assistant coach and was named head coach for the 1971–72 season, making him the third African–American head coach, after John McLendon and Bill Russell. A 2–5 start to the following campaign resulted in Lloyd being relieved of his duties and replaced by assistant coach Ray Scott on October 28, 1972. He had an overall record of 22–55 with the Pistons.

Lloyd worked for the Pistons as a scout for five seasons. Lloyd is credited with helping draft Bailey Howell and discovering Naismith Basketball Hall of Fame members Willis Reed and Earl Monroe, as well as Ray Scott and Wally Jones.

== Personal life ==
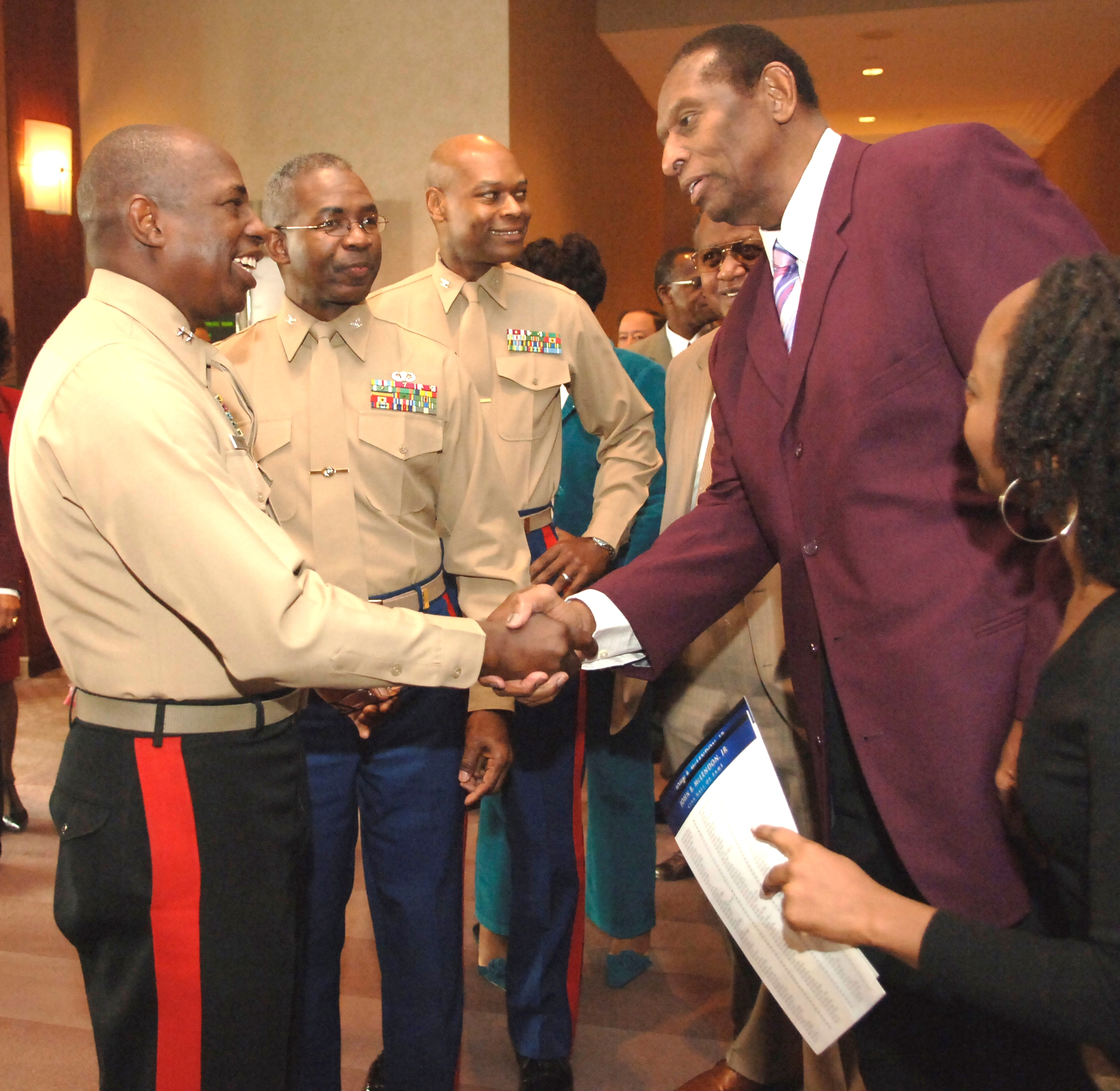
Lloyd (right) shakes hands with Lieutenant General Walter E. Gaskin in January 2006

After his basketball career, Lloyd worked during the 1970s and 1980s as a job placement administrator for the Detroit public school system. During this time, Lloyd also ran programs for underprivileged children teaching job skills.

Lloyd served as Community Relations Director for the Bing Group, a Detroit manufacturing company in the 1990s.

Approached by a young African–American player who said he was indebted to Lloyd for opening the doors for future generations of black players, Lloyd replied that he owed him absolutely nothing.

“You cannot understand what an honor this is,” Lloyd said in 2007 about the court at T. C. Williams High School being named in his honor. “There’s no better honor than being validated by people who know you best. I will always, always treasure this.”

Lloyd and his wife, Charlita, had three sons and four grandchildren. Lloyd resided in Fairfield Glade, Tennessee, just outside Crossville, Tennessee, until his death on February 26, 2015.

== Honors ==
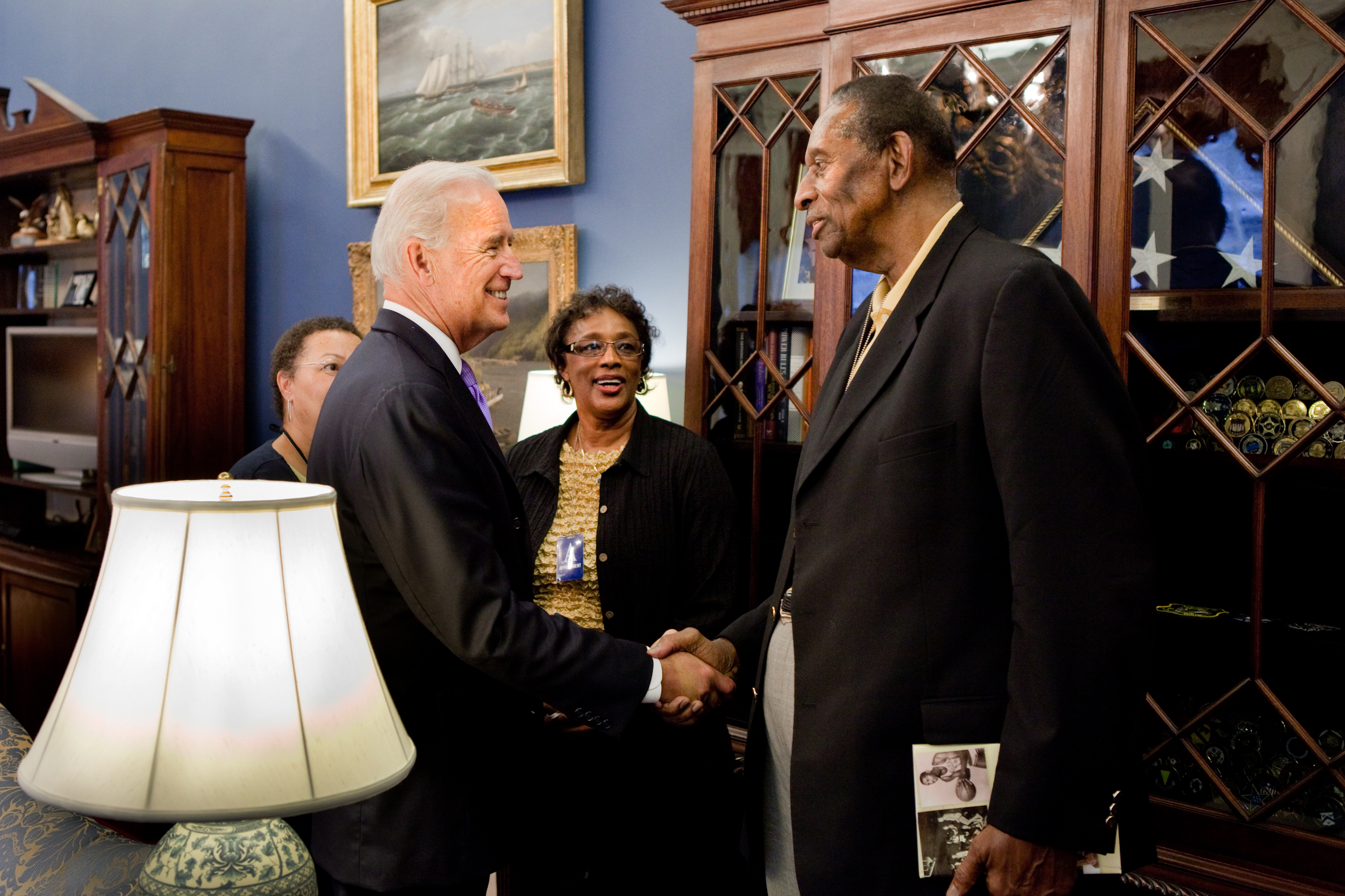
Lloyd meets Vice President Joe Biden at the White House in 2010

- In 1993, Lloyd was inducted into the Virginia Sports Hall of Fame.
- Lloyd was inducted into the Central Intercollegiate Athletic Association (CIAA) Hall of Fame in 1998.
- The state of Virginia, proclaimed on February 9, 2001, as "Earl Lloyd Day" by action of Virginia's Governor.
- In 2003, Lloyd was inducted to the Naismith Memorial Basketball Hall of Fame as a contributor.
- Lloyd was named to the National Association of Intercollegiate Athletics Silver and Golden Anniversary Teams.
- The newly constructed basketball court at T. C. Williams High School in Lloyd's home town of Alexandria, Virginia, was named in his honor in 2007. Lloyd attended Parker-Gray High School, as Alexandria's schools were racially segregated at the time. T.C. Williams—the subject of the motion picture Remember the Titans—was created as a combined, desegregated school two decades later.
- In November 2009, Moonfixer: The Basketball Journey of Earl Lloyd, was released. Lloyd wrote this biography with Syracuse area writer, Sean Kirst.
- In 2012, Lloyd was inducted into the Michigan Sports Hall of Fame.
- In 2014, a statue of Earl Lloyd was unveiled at West Virginia State University in the Walker Convocation Center. That same year, the "Earl Lloyd Classic" began, hosted at West Virginia State.
- In 2015 Lloyd, along with fellow basketball player Alonzo Mourning, was one of eight Virginians honored in the Library of Virginia's "Strong Men & Women in Virginia History" because of his contributions to the sport of basketball.
- In 2018, the road running in front of the Walker Convocation Center at West Virginia State University was renamed "Earl Lloyd Way."
- In 2022, the 200 block of Madison Street in the city of Syracuse was named "Earl Lloyd Way."

== NBA career statistics ==
Legend
GP	Games played	GS	Games started	MPG	Minutes per game
FG%	Field goal percentage	3P%	3-point field goal percentage	FT%	Free throw percentage
RPG	Rebounds per game	APG	Assists per game	SPG	Steals per game
BPG	Blocks per game	PPG	Points per game	**Bold**	Career high
†	Won an NBA championship

=== Regular season ===
Year	Team	GP	MPG	FG%	FT%	RPG	APG	PPG
1950–51	Washington	7	–	**.457**	**.846**	6.7	1.6	6.1
1952–53	Syracuse	64	28.2	.344	.693	6.9	1.0	7.4
1953–54	Syracuse	**72**	30.6	.374	.746	7.3	1.6	9.1
1954–55†	Syracuse	**72**	**30.7**	.365	.750	**7.7**	**2.1**	**10.2**
1955–56	Syracuse	**72**	25.5	.335	.772	6.8	1.6	8.5
1956–57	Syracuse	**72**	27.3	.373	.749	6.0	1.6	9.0
1957–58	Syracuse	61	17.1	.331	.745	4.7	1.0	5.2
1958–59	Detroit	**72**	24.9	.349	.753	6.9	1.3	8.4
1959–60	Detroit	68	23.7	.356	.800	4.7	1.3	8.9
Career		560	26.2	.356	.750	6.4	1.4	8.4

=== Playoffs ===
Year	Team	GP	MPG	FG%	FT%	RPG	APG	PPG
1953	Syracuse	2	**36.5**	.235	.700	4.5	2.5	7.5
1954	Syracuse	10	26.0	.342	.654	5.7	2.0	6.7
1955†	Syracuse	**11**	32.3	.361	.750	**8.1**	**3.2**	**11.5**
1956	Syracuse	8	21.5	.321	.929	5.4	0.9	8.1
1957	Syracuse	5	16.6	**.400**	.636	4.2	1.0	6.2
1958	Syracuse	3	10.7	.357	–	2.7	0.0	3.3
1959	Detroit	3	29.0	.321	**1.000**	6.0	2.3	8.7
1960	Detroit	2	26.5	.250	.625	4.5	1.5	8.5
Career		44	25.3	.337	.744	5.8	1.9	8.1

=== Head coaching record ===
Legend
Regular season	G	Games coached	W	Games won	L	Games lost	W–L %	Win–loss %
Playoffs	PG	Playoff games	PW	Playoff wins	PL	Playoff losses	PW–L %	Playoff win–loss %

Team	Year	G	W	L	W–L%	Finish	PG	PW	PL	PW–L%	Result
Detroit	1971–72	70	20	50	.286	6th in Midwest	–	–	–	–	Missed Playoffs
Detroit	1972–73	7	2	5	.286	(fired)	–	–	–	–	—
**Career**		77	22	55	.286		–	–	–	–	

== See also ==
- Race and ethnicity in the NBA
- List of African American firsts
