= 1955 NBA Finals =

1955 basketball championship series

Team	Coach	Wins
Syracuse Nationals	Al Cervi	4
Fort Wayne Pistons	Charles Eckman	3
- Dates: March 31–April 10
- Hall of Famers: Nationals: Dolph Schayes (1973); Earl Lloyd (2003); Pistons: George Yardley (1996); Andy Phillip (1961); Bob Houbregs (1987); Coaches: Al Cervi (1985, player); Officials: Mendy Rudolph (2007)
- Eastern finals: Nationals defeated Celtics, 3–1
- Western finals: Pistons defeated Lakers, 3–1

The 1955 NBA World Championship Series was the championship round of the 1954–55 NBA season. The best-of-seven series was won by the Syracuse Nationals, who defeated the Fort Wayne Pistons in the final game when Syracuse's George King made a free throw with 12 seconds left to put the Nationals up 92–91. King then stole the ball from Fort Wayne's Andy Phillip with three seconds remaining to clinch the victory for Syracuse. The arena was booked prior to the team making the finals and was thus not available, and the Fort Wayne home games were played in Indianapolis.

It has been alleged that some Fort Wayne players conspired with gamblers to throw the series to Syracuse. The suspicious nature of the seventh game in particular has raised concerns about the legitimacy of the series. Fort Wayne led Syracuse 41–24 early in the second quarter, then allowed the Nationals to rally to win the game. Andy Phillip, who turned the ball over with three seconds left in the game, was believed by at least one of his teammates, George Yardley, to have thrown the game. "There were always unwholesome implications about that ball game", Yardley told the author Charley Rosen. However, Phillip may not have acted alone. Other Pistons players were strongly believed to have thrown games during the 1954 and 1955 NBA seasons. In fact, Yardley himself turned the ball over to Syracuse with a palming violation with 18 seconds remaining in Game 7. The foul that gave Syracuse its winning free throw, meanwhile, was committed by Frankie Brian. The NBA did not return to the 2–3–2 format until 1985. As of the 2026, this is the only NBA Finals to date in which the home team has won all seven games.

As of 2026, 1955 remains the only year in which the Stanley Cup Final, NBA Finals, and World Series all went the full seven games.

== Series summary ==
Game	Date	Home team	Result	Road team
Game 1	March 31	Syracuse Nationals	87–82 (1–0)	Fort Wayne Pistons
Game 2	April 2	Syracuse Nationals	87–84 (2–0)	Fort Wayne Pistons
Game 3	April 3	Fort Wayne Pistons*	96–89 (1–2)	Syracuse Nationals
Game 4	April 5	Fort Wayne Pistons*	109–102 (2–2)	Syracuse Nationals
Game 5	April 7	Fort Wayne Pistons*	74–71 (3–2)	Syracuse Nationals
Game 6	April 9	Syracuse Nationals	109–104 (3–3)	Fort Wayne Pistons
Game 7	April 10	Syracuse Nationals	92–91 (4–3)	Fort Wayne Pistons

Nationals win series 4–3

- – Games played in Indianapolis

== Team rosters ==
=== Syracuse Nationals ===
1954–55 Syracuse Nationals roster
Players

Pos.	No.	Player	Height	Weight	DOB	From
SG	12	Dick Farley	6 ft 4 in (1.93 m)	190 lb (86 kg)	1932-04-13	Indiana
SG	7	Billy Gabor	5 ft 11 in (1.80 m)	170 lb (77 kg)	1922-05-13	Syracuse
SG	15	Bill Kenville	6 ft 2 in (1.88 m)	187 lb (85 kg)	1930-12-01	St. Bonaventure
C	10	Red Kerr	6 ft 9 in (2.06 m)	230 lb (104 kg)	1932-07-17	Illinois
PG	3	George King	6 ft 0 in (1.83 m)	175 lb (79 kg)	1928-08-16	Charleston (WV)
SF	11	Earl Lloyd	6 ft 5 in (1.96 m)	200 lb (91 kg)	1928-04-03	West Virginia State
SF	8	Wally Osterkorn	6 ft 5 in (1.96 m)	215 lb (98 kg)	1928-07-06	Illinois
C	16	Red Rocha	6 ft 9 in (2.06 m)	185 lb (84 kg)	1923-09-18	Oregon State
PF	4	Dolph Schayes	6 ft 8 in (2.03 m)	220 lb (100 kg)	1928-05-19	NYU
SG	5	Paul Seymour	6 ft 1 in (1.85 m)	180 lb (82 kg)	1928-01-30	Toledo
C	6	Connie Simmons	6 ft 8 in (2.03 m)	222 lb (101 kg)	1925-03-15	Flushing HS (NY)
PF	14	Jim Tucker	6 ft 7 in (2.01 m)	185 lb (84 kg)	1932-12-11	Duquesne

Coaches
Head coach

Al Cervi

Legend
- (DP) Unsigned draft pick
- (FA) Free agent
- (S) Suspended
- Injured

Roster

=== Fort Wayne Pistons ===
1954–55 Ft. Wayne Pistons roster
Players

Pos.	No.	Player	Height	Weight	DOB	From
SG	7	Frankie Brian	6 ft 1 in (1.85 m)	180 lb (82 kg)	May 1, 1923	LSU
C	16	Larry Foust	6 ft 9 in (2.06 m)	215 lb (98 kg)	June 24, 1928	La Salle
C	8	Bob Houbregs	6 ft 8 in (2.03 m)	225 lb (102 kg)	March 12, 1932	Washington
PF	9	Mel Hutchins	6 ft 6 in (1.98 m)	200 lb (91 kg)	November 22, 1928	BYU
PF	17	Monk Meineke	6 ft 7 in (2.01 m)	208 lb (94 kg)	October 30, 1930	Dayton
PG	14	Andy Phillip	6 ft 2 in (1.88 m)	195 lb (88 kg)	March 7, 1922	Illinois
SF	15	Dick Rosenthal	6 ft 5 in (1.96 m)	205 lb (93 kg)	January 20, 1930	Notre Dame
SG	5	Paul Walther	6 ft 2 in (1.88 m)	160 lb (73 kg)	March 23, 1927	Tennessee
SF	12	George Yardley	6 ft 5 in (1.96 m)	190 lb (86 kg)	November 3, 1928	Stanford
SG	10	Max Zaslofsky	6 ft 2 in (1.88 m)	170 lb (77 kg)	December 7, 1925	St. John's

Coaches
Head coach

Charles Eckman

Legend
- (DP) Unsigned draft pick
- (FA) Free agent
- (S) Suspended
- Injured

Roster

== Box scores ==
March 31

Boxscore

Fort Wayne Pistons 82, Syracuse Nationals 86
Scoring by quarter: 19–26, 25–22, 20–18, 18–20
Pts: Larry Foust 26	Pts: Red Rocha 19
Syracuse leads series, 1–0

Onondaga War Memorial, Syracuse, New York
Attendance: 7,500

April 2

Boxscore

Fort Wayne Pistons 84, Syracuse Nationals 87
Scoring by quarter: 13–30, 25–29, 27–14, 19–24
Pts: George Yardley 21	Pts: Dolph Schayes 24
Syracuse leads series, 2–0

Onondaga War Memorial, Syracuse, New York
Attendance: 5,845

April 3

Boxscore

Syracuse Nationals 89, Fort Wayne Pistons 96
Scoring by quarter: 22–23, 21–20, 14–26, 32–27
Pts: Rocha, Schayes 21 each	Pts: Mel Hutchins 23
Syracuse leads series, 2–1

Butler Fieldhouse, Indianapolis, Indiana
Attendance: 3,200

April 5

Boxscore

Syracuse Nationals 102, Fort Wayne Pistons 109
Scoring by quarter: 24–27, 24–26, 22–29, 32–27
Pts: Dolph Schayes 28	Pts: Frankie Brian 18
Series tied, 2–2

Butler Fieldhouse, Indianapolis, Indiana
Attendance: 2,611

April 7

Boxscore

Syracuse Nationals 71, Fort Wayne Pistons 74
Scoring by quarter: 18–22, 13–16, 14–20, 26–16
Pts: Bill Kenville 15	Pts: George Yardley 16
Fort Wayne leads series, 3–2

Butler Fieldhouse, Indianapolis, Indiana
Attendance: 4,110

April 9

Boxscore

Fort Wayne Pistons 104, Syracuse Nationals 109
Scoring by quarter: 27–19, 28–34, 19–25, 30–31
Pts: George Yardley 31	Pts: Dolph Schayes 28
Series tied, 3–3

Onondaga War Memorial, Syracuse, New York
Attendance: 4,997

April 10

Boxscore

Fort Wayne Pistons 91, Syracuse Nationals 92
Scoring by quarter: 31–21, 22–26, 21–27, 17–18
Pts: Larry Foust 24; Asts: Andy Phillip 10	Pts: King, Kenville 15 each Asts: Paul Seymour 8
Syracuse wins series, 4–3

Onondaga War Memorial, Syracuse, New York
Attendance: 6,697

- George King hit a free throw with 12 seconds left, then stole the ball from Andy Phillip with 3 seconds left to seal it.

== See also ==
- 1955 NBA playoffs
