= 1955 NBA playoffs =

Postseason tournament

Tournament details
- Dates: March 15 – April 10, 1955
- Season: 1954–55
- Teams: 6

Final positions
- Champions: Syracuse Nationals (1st title)
- Runner-up: Fort Wayne Pistons
- Semifinalists: Minneapolis Lakers; Boston Celtics

The 1955 NBA playoffs was the postseason tournament of the National Basketball Association's 1954–55 season. The tournament concluded with the Eastern Conference champion Syracuse Nationals defeating the Western Conference champion Fort Wayne Pistons 4 games to 3 in the NBA Finals.

This was the only title for the Nationals under that moniker; the franchise won its next title in 1967 as the Philadelphia 76ers.

For the Pistons, this was their first trip to the NBA Finals in franchise history; they returned the next year, but didn't win their first title until 1989 as the Detroit Pistons.

After experimenting with a round robin playoff format in 1954, the NBA moved to a system in which the top team in each conference earned a first-round bye, giving them the right to start out in the division finals. It remained in place until 1967, when it changed to an eight-team format in which all teams played the first round.

== Bracket ==
Division Semifinals
E3	Boston	2
E2	New York	1
W3	Rochester	1
W2	Minneapolis	2

Division Finals
Eastern Division
E1	Syracuse*	3
E3	Boston	1
Western Division
W1	Fort Wayne*	3
W2	Minneapolis	1

NBA Finals
E1	Syracuse*	4
W1	Fort Wayne*	3

- * Division winner
- Bold Series winner
- Italic Team with home-court advantage in NBA Finals

== Division Semifinals ==
=== Eastern Division Semifinals ===
==== (2) New York Knicks vs. (3) Boston Celtics ====
March 15

Boxscore

New York Knicks 101, Boston Celtics 122
Scoring by quarter: 22–24, 19–29, 30–34, 30–35
Pts: Jim Baechtold 17	Pts: Bob Cousy 30
Boston leads series, 1–0

Boston Garden, Boston, Massachusetts

March 16

Boxscore

Boston Celtics 95, New York Knicks 102
Scoring by quarter: 33–21, 26–27, 18–28, 18–26
Pts: Bob Cousy 26	Pts: Nat Clifton 25
Series tied, 1–1

Madison Square Garden III, Manhattan, New York

March 19

Boxscore

Boston Celtics 116, New York Knicks 109
Scoring by quarter: 30–16, 25–45, 32–20, 29–28
Pts: Bob Cousy 26; Asts: Bob Cousy 10	Pts: Nat Clifton 21; Asts: Nat Clifton 6
Boston wins series, 2–1

Madison Square Garden III, Manhattan, New York

This was the fifth playoff meeting between these two teams, with the Knicks winning three of the first four meetings.

Previous playoff series
New York leads 3–1 in all-time playoff series

1951

Boston Celtics 0, New York Knicks 2

1951 Eastern Division Semifinals

1952

Boston Celtics 1, New York Knicks 2

1952 Eastern Division Semifinals

1953

Boston Celtics 1, New York Knicks 3

1953 Eastern Division Finals

1954

Boston Celtics 2, New York Knicks 0

1954 Eastern Division Round Robin Semifinals

=== Western Division Semifinals ===
==== (2) Minneapolis Lakers vs. (3) Rochester Royals ====
March 16

Boxscore

Rochester Royals 78, Minneapolis Lakers 82
Scoring by quarter: 18–13, 17–25, 21–19, 22–25
Pts: Bobby Wanzer 30	Pts: Clyde Lovellette 26
Minneapolis leads series, 1–0

St. Paul Auditorium, Saint Paul, Minnesota
Attendance: 4,841

March 18

Boxscore

Minneapolis Lakers 92, Rochester Royals 94
Scoring by quarter: 27–24, 23–25, 20–22, 22–23
Pts: Clyde Lovellette 19	Pts: Arnie Risen 19
Series tied, 1–1

Edgerton Park Arena, Rochester, New York

March 19

Boxscore

Rochester Royals 110, Minneapolis Lakers 119
Scoring by quarter: 29–28, 30–32, 18–35, 33–24
Pts: Arnie Risen 24	Pts: Jim Pollard 26
Minneapolis wins series, 2–1

St. Paul Auditorium, Saint Paul, Minnesota
Attendance: 4,219

- Bob Davies’s final NBA game.

This was the sixth playoff meeting between these two teams, with the Lakers winning four of the first five meetings.

Previous playoff series
Minneapolis leads 4–1 in all-time playoff series

1949

Minneapolis Lakers 2, Rochester Royals 0

1949 Western Division Finals

1951

Minneapolis Lakers 1, Rochester Royals 3

1951 Western Division Finals

1952

Minneapolis Lakers 3, Rochester Royals 1

1952 Western Division Finals

1954

Minneapolis Lakers 1, Rochester Royals 0

1954 Western Division Round Robin Semifinals

1954

Minneapolis Lakers 2, Rochester Royals 1

1954 Western Division Finals

== Division Finals ==
=== Eastern Division Finals ===
==== (1) Syracuse Nationals vs. (3) Boston Celtics ====
March 22

Boxscore

Boston Celtics 100, Syracuse Nationals 110
Scoring by quarter: 22–25, 21–21, 27–37, 30–27
Pts: Bill Sharman 20; Asts: Bob Cousy 10	Pts: Red Kerr 27; Asts: Paul Seymour 8
Syracuse leads series, 1–0

Onondaga War Memorial, Syracuse, New York

March 24

Boxscore

Boston Celtics 110, Syracuse Nationals 116
Scoring by quarter: 24–28, 30–41, 34–23, 22–24
Pts: Bill Sharman 32; Rebs: Don Barksdale 10; Asts: Bob Cousy 15	Pts: Dolph Schayes 22; Rebs: Dolph Schayes 18; Asts: Paul Seymour 12
Syracuse leads series, 2–0

Onondaga War Memorial, Syracuse, New York

March 26

Boxscore

Syracuse Nationals 97, Boston Celtics 100 (OT)
Scoring by quarter: 24–23, 22–29, 21–21, 22–16, Overtime: 8–11
Pts: Red Kerr 20; Rebs: Dolph Schayes 14; Asts: George King 10	Pts: Bob Cousy 23; Rebs: Bob Brannum 15; Asts: Bob Cousy 8
Syracuse leads series, 2–1

Boston Garden, Boston, Massachusetts

March 27

Boxscore

Syracuse Nationals 110, Boston Celtics 94
Scoring by quarter: 18–18, 31–24, 26–21, 35–31
Pts: Dolph Schayes 28; Rebs: Earl Lloyd 18; Asts: King, Seymour 8 each	Pts: Bill Sharman 29; Rebs: Bob Brannum 14; Asts: Bob Cousy 9
Syracuse wins series, 3–1

Boston Garden, Boston, Massachusetts

This was the fourth playoff meeting between these two teams, with the Nationals winning two of the first three meetings.

Previous playoff series
Syracuse leads 2–1 in all-time playoff series

1953

Boston Celtics 2, Syracuse Nationals 0

1953 Eastern Division Semifinals

1954

Boston Celtics 0, Syracuse Nationals 2

1954 Eastern Division Round Robin Semifinals

1954

Boston Celtics 0, Syracuse Nationals 2

1954 Eastern Division Finals

=== Western Division Finals ===
==== (1) Fort Wayne Pistons vs. (2) Minneapolis Lakers ====
March 20

Boxscore

Minneapolis Lakers 79, Fort Wayne Pistons 96
Scoring by quarter: 14–19, 18–30, 21–27, 26–20
Pts: Clyde Lovellette 18	Pts: Larry Foust 15
Fort Wayne leads series, 1–0

North Side Gymnasium, Elkhart, Indiana
Referees: Lou Eisenstein, Arnie Heft

March 22

Boxscore

Minneapolis Lakers 97, Fort Wayne Pistons 98 (OT)
Scoring by quarter: 22–27, 28–24, 21–25, 26–21, Overtime: 0–1
Pts: Whitey Skoog 24	Pts: Mel Hutchins 20
Fort Wayne leads series, 2–0

Butler Fieldhouse, Indianapolis, Indiana

March 23

Boxscore

Fort Wayne Pistons 91, Minneapolis Lakers 99 (OT)
Scoring by quarter: 22–12, 19–20, 25–30, 18–22, Overtime: 7–15
Pts: George Yardley 25	Pts: Whitey Skoog 24
Fort Wayne leads series, 2–1

Minneapolis Auditorium, Minneapolis, Minnesota

March 27

Boxscore

Fort Wayne Pistons 105, Minneapolis Lakers 96
Scoring by quarter: 25–31, 20–15, 27–20, 33–30
Pts: Rosenthal, Hutchins 21 each	Pts: Clyde Lovellette 25
Fort Wayne wins series, 3–1

Minneapolis Auditorium, Minneapolis, Minnesota

- Jim Pollard’s final NBA game.

This was the fourth playoff meeting between these two teams, with the Lakers winning the first three meetings.

Previous playoff series
Minneapolis leads 3–0 in all-time playoff series

1950

Fort Wayne Pistons 0, Minneapolis Lakers 2

1950 Central Division Finals

1953

Fort Wayne Pistons 2, Minneapolis Lakers 3

1953 Western Division Finals

1954

Fort Wayne Pistons 0, Minneapolis Lakers 2

1954 Western Division Round Robin Semifinals

== NBA Finals: (E1) Syracuse Nationals vs. (W1) Fort Wayne Pistons ==
March 31

Boxscore

Fort Wayne Pistons 82, Syracuse Nationals 86
Scoring by quarter: 19–26, 25–22, 20–18, 18–20
Pts: Larry Foust 26	Pts: Red Rocha 19
Syracuse leads series, 1–0

Onondaga War Memorial, Syracuse, New York
Attendance: 7,500

April 2

Boxscore

Fort Wayne Pistons 84, Syracuse Nationals 87
Scoring by quarter: 13–30, 25–29, 27–14, 19–24
Pts: George Yardley 21	Pts: Dolph Schayes 24
Syracuse leads series, 2–0

Onondaga War Memorial, Syracuse, New York
Attendance: 5,845

April 3

Boxscore

Syracuse Nationals 89, Fort Wayne Pistons 96
Scoring by quarter: 22–23, 21–20, 14–26, 32–27
Pts: Rocha, Schayes 21 each	Pts: Mel Hutchins 23
Syracuse leads series, 2–1

Butler Fieldhouse, Indianapolis, Indiana
Attendance: 3,200

April 5

Boxscore

Syracuse Nationals 102, Fort Wayne Pistons 109
Scoring by quarter: 24–27, 24–26, 22–29, 32–27
Pts: Dolph Schayes 28	Pts: Frankie Brian 18
Series tied, 2–2

Butler Fieldhouse, Indianapolis, Indiana
Attendance: 2,611

April 7

Boxscore

Syracuse Nationals 71, Fort Wayne Pistons 74
Scoring by quarter: 18–22, 13–16, 14–20, 26–16
Pts: Bill Kenville 15	Pts: George Yardley 16
Fort Wayne leads series, 3–2

Butler Fieldhouse, Indianapolis, Indiana
Attendance: 4,110

April 9

Boxscore

Fort Wayne Pistons 104, Syracuse Nationals 109
Scoring by quarter: 27–19, 28–34, 19–25, 30–31
Pts: George Yardley 31	Pts: Dolph Schayes 28
Series tied, 3–3

Onondaga War Memorial, Syracuse, New York
Attendance: 4,997

April 10

Boxscore

Fort Wayne Pistons 91, Syracuse Nationals 92
Scoring by quarter: 31–21, 22–26, 21–27, 17–18
Pts: Larry Foust 24; Asts: Andy Phillip 10	Pts: King, Kenville 15 each Asts: Paul Seymour 8
Syracuse wins series, 4–3

Onondaga War Memorial, Syracuse, New York
Attendance: 6,697

- George King hit a free throw with 12 seconds left, then stole the ball from Andy Phillip with 3 seconds left to seal it.

This was the first playoff meeting between these two teams.
