= Dolph Schayes =

American basketball player and coach (1928–2015)

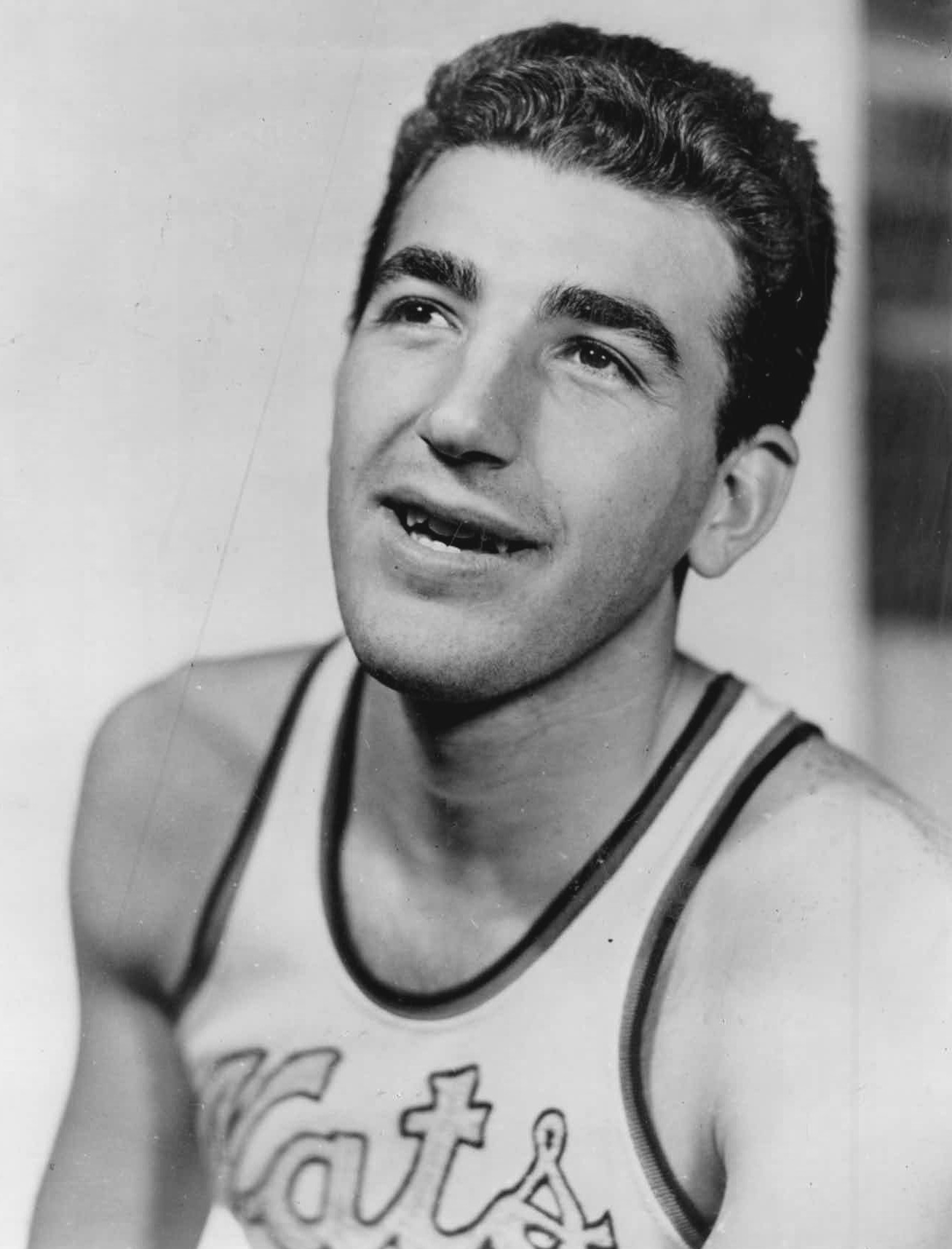
- Schayes with the Syracuse Nationals in 1955

Personal information
- Born: May 19, 1928 The Bronx, New York, U.S.
- Died: December 10, 2015 (aged 87) Syracuse, New York, U.S.
- Listed height: 6 ft 8 in (2.03 m)
- Listed weight: 220 lb (100 kg)

Career information
- High school: DeWitt Clinton (The Bronx, New York)
- College: NYU (1944–1948)
- BAA draft: 1948: 1st round, 4th overall pick
- Drafted by: New York Knicks
- Playing career: 1948–1964
- Position: Power forward
- Number: 55, 4
- Coaching career: 1963–1972

Career history

Playing
- 1948–1964: Syracuse Nationals / Philadelphia 76ers

Career highlights
- As player: NBA champion (1955); 12× NBA All-Star (1951–1962); 6× All-NBA First Team (1952–1955, 1957, 1958); 6× All-NBA Second Team (1950, 1951, 1956, 1959–1961); NBA rebounding leader (1951); NBA anniversary team (25th, 50th, 75th); NBL Rookie of the Year (1949); No. 4 retired by Philadelphia 76ers; Haggerty Award (1948); As coach: NBA Coach of the Year (1966)

Career NBA statistics
- Points: 19,249 (18.2 ppg) (NBL/BAA/NBA); 18,438 (18.5 ppg) (BAA/NBA)
- Rebounds: 11,256 (12.1 rpg)
- Assists: 3,072 (3.1 apg)
- Stats at NBA.com
- Stats at Basketball Reference
- Basketball Hall of Fame
- Collegiate Basketball Hall of Fame

Adolph Schayes (/ˈʃeɪz/ SHAYZ; May 19, 1928 – December 10, 2015) was an American professional basketball player and coach in the National Basketball Association (NBA). A top scorer and rebounder, he was a 12-time NBA All-Star and a 12-time All-NBA selection. Schayes won an NBA championship with the Syracuse Nationals in 1955. He was named one of the 50 Greatest Players in NBA History, and was also named to the NBA 75th Anniversary Team in 2021. He was inducted into the Naismith Memorial Basketball Hall of Fame in 1973.

Schayes finished in the top 10 in scoring in 10 of 11 years from 1949-50 through 1960-61, led the league in free-throw percentage thrice, finished in the top five for rebounds per game every year from 1950-51 to 1958-59 whilst also leading the league in rebounding in 1950-51. Schayes set a record in 1950 with 35 rebounds in a game. Schayes also finished top five in MVP voting three times.

Schayes played his entire career with the Nationals and their successor, the Philadelphia 76ers, from 1948 to 1964. In his 16-year career, he led his team into the playoffs 15 times. After the Nationals moved to Philadelphia, Schayes became player-coach of the newly minted 76ers. He ended his playing career after the 1963–64 season and stayed on as coach for two more seasons, earning NBA Coach of the Year honors in 1966. He briefly coached with the Buffalo Braves.

Schayes made the first basket in All-Star game history.

== Early life ==
Adolph Schayes was born on May 19, 1928, in the Bronx, New York City, the son of Tina (née Michel), a homemaker, and Carl Schayes, a truck driver for Consolidated Laundries. His parents were Romanian-Jewish immigrants. He grew up on Davidson Avenue and 183rd Street, near Jerome Avenue in University Heights, Bronx.

Schayes attended Creston Junior High School 79 and DeWitt Clinton High School in the Bronx, where he excelled in basketball, playing for the basketball team and led it to a borough championship. At 6-foot-8, Dolph Schayes was agile and possessed great finesse around the basket. From 1944 to 1948, Schayes popularized the city game while starring under Hall of Fame coach Howard Cann at New York University

== College career ==
Schayes played his college basketball at New York University (NYU) in 1944–48. In 1945, as a 16-year-old freshman, Schayes helped NYU reach the NCAA final. Schayes earned an aeronautical engineering degree, was an All-American in basketball and won the Haggerty Award in his final year. His NYU coach, Howard Cann, said of him: "He was in the gym practicing every spare minute. We had to chase him out."

== Professional career ==
=== Syracuse Nationals / Philadelphia 76ers (1948–1964) ===
Schayes was drafted by both the New York Knicks in the 1948 BAA draft (1st round; 4th pick overall), and by the Tri-Cities Blackhawks in the NBL draft. The Blackhawks traded his rights to the Syracuse Nationals, who then offered him a contract worth $7,500 (worth $100,500 today), 50% more than the Knicks, influencing his decision to go to Syracuse. Schayes played one season in the NBL and was named the league's Rookie of the Year. The following season (1949–50), the Nationals moved to the newly formed National Basketball Association as part of the merger between the BAA and NBL.

Although tall for his era at 6 ft 8 in (203 cm), Schayes was especially known for his deadly, high-arcing, outside set-shot. It arced so high that his teammates came to call it the "Sputnik". Defenders who attempted to deny him the outside shot were confronted by his powerful drive to the basket. These two offensive weapons served him well, even as the NBA was transitioning from basketball's traditional set shot into a league of jump-shooters.

Early in Schayes' career, he broke his right arm and played almost an entire season in a cast. Oddly, this injury became a seminal point in his development: he learned to shoot with his off-hand, making him especially difficult to guard. He was one of the best—and the last—to use a two-handed set-shot with feet planted on the floor, before the game changed to one-handed jump shots.

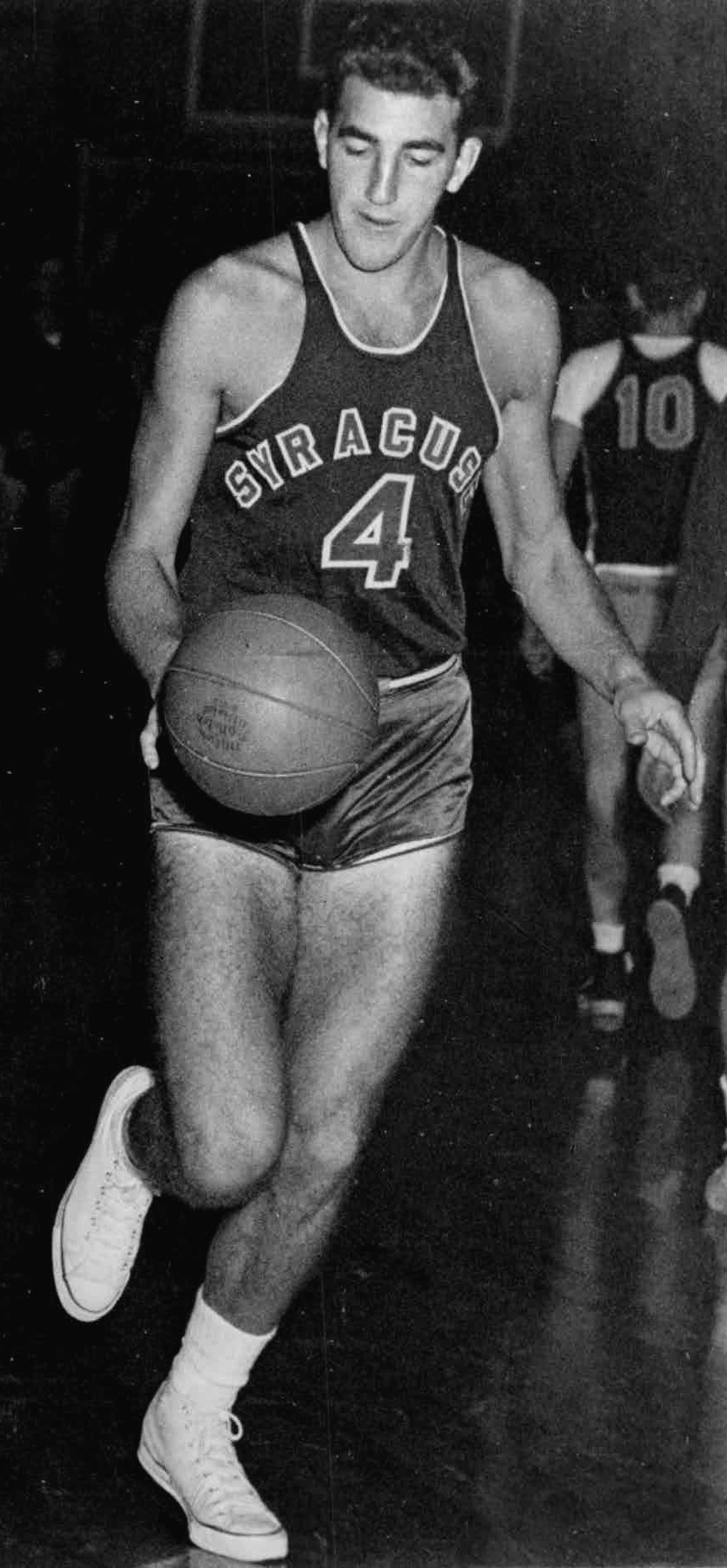
Schayes in 1951

In the 1949–50 season, Schayes was sixth in the league in assists, with 259. He led the NBA in rebounding in 1950–51 (in which he also had 10 of the top 14 individual rebounding games), with 1,080 and a 16.4-per-game average. He was third in the league in rebounding in 1952–53, with 920. In 1953–54, his 12.3 rebounds per game were fourth-best in the NBA.

In 1954–55, Schayes led his team to the NBA championship. In 1956–57, he led the league in minutes-per-game (39.6) and free throws (625), while grabbing 1,008 rebounds (3rd in the league) and averaging 22.6 points per game (4th in the league). In 1957, he set an NBA consecutive free throw record in a single game with 18. In 1957–58 he again led the league in minutes-per-game (40.5), and averaged a career-high 24.9 points per game, second in the league, while averaging 14.2 rebounds per game (fourth in the NBA).

Schayes led the NBA in free throw percentage three times: in 1958 (.904), 1960 (.892) and 1962 (.896). In 1959, he scored a career-high 50 points in a game against the Celtics. In the NBA, he didn't miss a single game from February 17, 1952, to December 26, 1961, an NBA-record streak of 706 games. In 1960–61, he again led the league in free throws (with 680). In 1961, he became the first player in NBA history to amass 30,000 career total PRA (Points + Rebounds + Assists).

=== NBA career achievements ===
Schayes was the first person in the NBA to ever surpass 15,000 points and 10,000 rebounds.

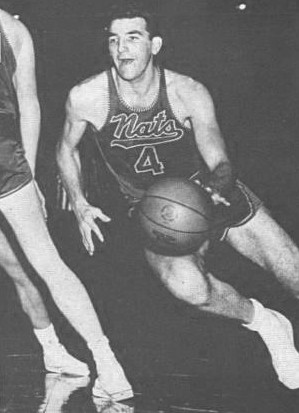
Schayes ca. 1957

A 12-time NBA All-Star, Schayes was a six-time All-NBA First Team honoree, and was also selected to the All-NBA Second Team six times. He came in second in MVP voting in 1958, and 5th in both 1956 and 1957. When he retired in 1964, he held the NBA records for games played (996), foul shots made (6,712), attempted (7,904), personal fouls (3,432) and was second to Bob Pettit in scoring (18,438) and third in rebounds (11,256).

== Coaching career and referee supervisor ==
=== Philadelphia 76ers (1963–1966) ===
When the Nationals moved to Philadelphia in 1963 as the Philadelphia 76ers, Schayes became player-coach. However, his playing career had all but ended; he only played in 24 games, the only time in his career in which he played in fewer than 50 games. He didn't play at all during the playoffs.

Schayes retired as a player after the season but stayed on as coach for three more seasons. He was named NBA Coach of the Year in 1966. That season, he led the Sixers to the Eastern Division regular-season title, ending a nine-year reign by the Boston Celtics. However, the Celtics ousted the Sixers in a five-game Eastern final, and Schayes was fired. He was succeeded by his predecessor with the Nats, Alex Hannum, who led the team to the best record in league history at the time and an NBA title.

From 1966 to 1970, Schayes was the supervisor of NBA referees. He was named the first coach of the Buffalo Braves in 1970, but was fired one game into his second season after a 123-90 loss to the Seattle SuperSonics.

=== Maccabiah Games coach ===
Schayes coached the US Maccabiah Games basketball team to an upset win to take the gold medal in the 1977 Maccabiah Games. He also coached the U.S. Masters basketball team at the 1993 Maccabiah Games. He also played an active role raising money for the Maccabiah Games.

== Personal life ==
Schayes settled in Syracuse, New York, in 1948, where he first played in the NBA, and where he was a real estate developer after his playing days.

Schayes' son is retired NBA center Danny Schayes, who played for Jamesville-DeWitt High School, in DeWitt, New York; Syracuse University; and in the NBA for 18 seasons. His granddaughters Abi, Carla, and Rachel Goettsch won silver medals for the United States volleyball team at the 2001 Maccabiah Games, and his grandson Mickey Ferri won a gold medal in the 4 × 100 metres relay at the 2005 Maccabiah Games.

Schayes died of cancer on December 10, 2015, at the age of 87. He was buried at Woodlawn Cemetery in Syracuse.

== Legacy ==
In 1970, Schayes was elected to the NBA 25th Anniversary Team as one of the top 12 retired players.

In 1972, Schayes was elected to the Naismith Memorial Basketball Hall of Fame. He is also a member of the International Jewish Sports Hall of Fame, the US National Jewish Sports Hall of Fame, the National Jewish American Sports Hall of Fame, and the Philadelphia Jewish Sports Hall of Fame.

In 1996, Schayes was selected as one of the 50 Greatest Players in NBA History.

In May 2015, Schayes was inducted into the Bronx Walk of Fame, where he received a street named in his honor, called "Dolph Schayes Street".

The 76ers retired Schayes' jersey on March 12, 2016, while the Syracuse Crunch retired it on March 26, 2016.

In 2021, Schayes was elected to the NBA 75th Anniversary Team. To commemorate the NBA's 75th Anniversary The Athletic ranked their top 75 players of all time, and named Schayes as the 61st greatest player in NBA history.

== NBA career statistics ==
Legend
GP	Games played	GS	Games started	MPG	Minutes per game
FG%	Field goal percentage	3P%	3-point field goal percentage	FT%	Free throw percentage
RPG	Rebounds per game	APG	Assists per game	SPG	Steals per game
BPG	Blocks per game	PPG	Points per game	**Bold**	Career high
†	Won an NBA championship	*	Led the league

=== Regular season ===
Year	Team	GP	MPG	FG%	FT%	RPG	APG	PPG
1949–50	Syracuse	64	—	.385	.774	—	**4.0**	16.8
1950–51	Syracuse	66	—	.357	.752	**16.4***	3.8	17.0
1951–52	Syracuse	63	31.8	.355	.807	12.3	2.9	13.8
1952–53	Syracuse	71	37.6	.374	.827	13.0	3.2	17.8
1953–54	Syracuse	72	36.9	.380	.827	12.1	3.0	17.1
1954–55†	Syracuse	72	35.1	.383	.833	12.3	3.0	18.5
1955–56	Syracuse	72	35.0	.387	.858	12.4	2.8	20.4
1956–57	Syracuse	72	39.6*	.379	**.904**	14.0	3.2	22.5
1957–58	Syracuse	72	**40.5***	.398	**.904***	14.2	3.1	**24.9**
1958–59	Syracuse	72	36.7	.387	.864	13.4	2.5	21.3
1959–60	Syracuse	75	36.5	**.401**	.893*	12.8	3.4	22.5
1960–61	Syracuse	**79**	38.1	.372	.868	12.2	3.7	23.6
1961–62	Syracuse	56	26.4	.357	.897*	7.8	2.1	14.7
1962–63	Syracuse	66	21.8	.388	.879	5.7	2.7	9.5
1963–64	Philadelphia	24	14.6	.308	.807	4.6	2.0	5.6
Career		996	34.4	.380	.849	12.1	3.1	18.5
All-Star		11	22.5	.440	.840	9.5	1.5	12.5

=== Playoffs ===
Year	Team	GP	MPG	FG%	FT%	RPG	APG	PPG
1950	Syracuse	11	—	.385	.733	—	2.5	17.1
1951	Syracuse	7	—	.448	.766	14.6	2.9	20.4
1952	Syracuse	7	35.4	.451	.769	12.9	2.1	20.3
1953	Syracuse	2	29.0	.250	.769	8.5	0.5	9.0
1954	Syracuse	**13**	28.8	**.457**	.741	10.5	1.8	16.0
1955†	Syracuse	11	33.0	.359	.840	12.8	3.6	19.0
1956	Syracuse	8	38.8	.366	.880	13.9	3.4	22.1
1957	Syracuse	5	43.0	.305	.891	**18.0**	2.8	21.4
1958	Syracuse	3	**43.7**	.391	.833	15.0	3.1	26.7
1959	Syracuse	9	39.0	.400	.916	13.0	**4.6**	28.2
1960	Syracuse	3	42.0	.455	**.933**	16.0	2.7	**29.3**
1961	Syracuse	8	38.5	.336	.900	11.4	2.6	20.6
1962	Syracuse	5	19.0	.364	.692	7.0	1.0	11.4
1963	Syracuse	5	21.6	.455	.917	5.6	1.4	10.2
Career		97	34.0	.390	.825	12.2	2.6	19.5

== Head coaching record ==
Team	Year	G	W	L	W–L%	Finish	PG	PW	PL	PW–L%	Result
Philadelphia	1963–64	80	34	46	.425	3rd	5	2	3	.400	Lost Division semifinals
Philadelphia	1964–65	80	40	40	.500	3rd in	11	6	5	.545	Lost Division finals
Philadelphia	1965–66	80	55	25	.688	1st	5	1	4	.200	Lost Division finals
Buffalo	1970–71	82	22	60	.268	4th	—	—	—	—	Missed playoffs
Buffalo	1971–72	1	0	1	.000	left mid-season	—	—	—	—	—
Career		323	151	172	.467		21	9	12	.429	

== See also ==
- List of select Jewish basketball players
- List of NBA annual minutes played leaders
- List of NBA career rebounding leaders
- List of NBA career personal fouls leaders
- List of NBA career free throw scoring leaders
- List of NBA career playoff free throw scoring leaders
- List of NBA players who have spent their entire career with one franchise
