= 1954–55 Syracuse Nationals season =

First NBA championship season for Nationals (only championship won in Syracuse)

- NBA champions
- Division champions
- Head coach: Al Cervi
- Arena: Onondaga War Memorial

Results
- Record: 43–29 (.597)
- Place: Division: 1st (Eastern)
- Playoff finish: NBA champions
- Stats at Basketball Reference
- Radio: WSYR

During the 1954–55 Syracuse Nationals season (their 6th), the National Basketball Association (NBA) was struggling financially and down to just 8 teams.

During a very early portion of the season, the Nationals played a game against the Baltimore Bullets on October 30, 1954, winning that game 69–67 for what originally was their season opener before the original Bullets team later folded operations early in the season on November 27, 1954; that game they played would ultimately end up being wiped out from the official record books for the NBA's history. If the game they played was officially kept as a part of the season's record for the Nationals, their official record would have had Syracuse get a winning record of 44–29 instead of 43–29 for their season.

Nationals owner Danny Biasone suggested that the league limit the amount of time taken for a shot. Biasone was upset with the stalling tactics of opposing teams. During the summer of 1954, Biasone had gotten together some of his pros and a group of high school players and timed them with a stopwatch. Most shots were taken within 12 seconds, Biasone discovered. Biasone calculated that a 24-second shot clock would allow at least 30 shots per quarter and assist in increasing scoring. The result would speed up a game that often ended with long periods of teams just holding the ball. Quickness and athletic ability became prized as they never had been before. Excessive fouling didn't disappear completely, but just about everyone concluded that the clock was good for the game. The shot clock was a success with the result that scoring was up 14 points per game league wide. In the 1st season of the shot clock, the Nats would take 1st place in the Eastern Division with a 43–29 record.

The Nationals won the NBA Finals that season following them beating the Boston Celtics 3–1 and winning all of their home games against the Fort Wayne Pistons to win 4–3 for their first NBA Finals championship (and only one while under the Syracuse Nationals name). HoopsHype later ranked this squad as the team with the eighth-easiest path to an NBA Finals championship due to the records of their two opponents they faced off against.

== Offseason ==
=== NBA draft ===
Round	Pick	Player	Position	Nationality	College
1	6	Red Kerr	C/F	United States	Illinois

== Roster ==
1954-55 Syracuse Nationals roster
Players

Pos.	No.	Player	Height	Weight	DOB	From
SG	12	Dick Farley	6 ft 4 in (1.93 m)	190 lb (86 kg)	1932-04-13	Indiana
SG	7	Billy Gabor	5 ft 11 in (1.80 m)	170 lb (77 kg)	1922-05-13	Syracuse
SG	15	Bill Kenville	6 ft 2 in (1.88 m)	187 lb (85 kg)	1930-12-01	St. Bonaventure
C	10	Red Kerr	6 ft 9 in (2.06 m)	230 lb (104 kg)	1932-07-17	Illinois
PG	3	George King	6 ft 0 in (1.83 m)	175 lb (79 kg)	1928-08-16	Charleston (WV)
SF	11	Earl Lloyd	6 ft 5 in (1.96 m)	200 lb (91 kg)	1928-04-03	West Virginia State
SF	8	Wally Osterkorn	6 ft 5 in (1.96 m)	215 lb (98 kg)	1928-07-06	Illinois
C	16	Red Rocha	6 ft 9 in (2.06 m)	185 lb (84 kg)	1923-09-18	Oregon State
PF	4	Dolph Schayes	6 ft 8 in (2.03 m)	220 lb (100 kg)	1928-05-19	NYU
SG	5	Paul Seymour	6 ft 1 in (1.85 m)	180 lb (82 kg)	1928-01-30	Toledo
C	6	Connie Simmons	6 ft 8 in (2.03 m)	222 lb (101 kg)	1925-03-15	Flushing HS (NY)
PF	14	Jim Tucker	6 ft 7 in (2.01 m)	185 lb (84 kg)	1932-12-11	Duquesne

Coaches
Head coach

Al Cervi

Legend
- (DP) Unsigned draft pick
- (FA) Free agent
- (S) Suspended
- Injured

Roster

== Regular season ==
=== Season standings ===
Eastern Division	W	L	PCT	GB	Home	Road	Neutral	Div
x-Syracuse Nationals	43	29	.597	–	25–7	10–17	8–5	21–15
x-New York Knicks	38	34	.528	5	17–9	8–17	13–8	15–21
x-Boston Celtics	36	36	.500	7	21–5	4–22	11–9	19–17
Philadelphia Warriors	33	39	.458	10	14–5	6–20	13–14	17–19

=== Season schedule ===
Date	Opponent	Score	Result	Record
Oct 30	@ Baltimore Bullets	69–67	Win	0–0
Oct 31	Minneapolis Lakers	94–97	Loss	0–1
Nov 6	@ Boston Celtics	84–107	Loss	0–2
Nov 7	Milwaukee Hawks	97–80	Win	1–2
Nov 11	@ Fort Wayne Pistons	88–86	Win	2–2
Nov 13	@ Milwaukee Hawks	72–85	Loss	2–3
Nov 14	@ Minneapolis Lakers	92–99	Loss	2–4
Nov 16	Philadelphia Warriors (at New York, NY)	86–85	Win	3–4
Nov 18	Fort Wayne PIstons	91–82	Win	4–4
Nov 20	@ Rochester Royals	80–79	Win	5–4
Nov 21	Boston Celtics	110–104	Win	6–4
Nov 25	Milwaukee Hawks	91–85	Win	7–4
Nov 27	@ New York Knicks	80–74	Win	8–4
Nov 28	New York Knicks	79–77	Win	9–4
Dec 1	New York Knicks (at Philadelphia)	86–88	Loss	9–5
Dec 2	Rochester Royals	82–78	Win	10–5
Dec 4	@ Philadelphia Warriors	73–79	Loss	10–6
Dec 5	Philadelphia Warriors	89–72	Win	11–6
Dec 7	Philadelphia Warriors (at New Haven, CT)	88–81	Win	12–6
Dec 8	@ Rochester Royals	78–105	Loss	12–7
Dec 9	Boston Celtics	120–107	Win	13–7
Dec 11	@ Boston Celtics	90-94	Loss	13–8
Dec 12	Philadelphia Warriors	87-96	Loss	13–9
Dec 14	@ New York Knicks	91-82	Win	14–9
Dec 15	New York Knicks (at Boston, MA)	81-88	Loss	14–10
Dec 18	@ Minneapolis Lakers	83-86	Loss	14–11
Dec 19	Minneapolis Lakers	108-93	Win	15–11
Dec 25	@ New York Knicks	101-109	Loss	15–12
Dec 26	New York Knicks	97-92 (OT)	Win	16–12
Dec 28	Rochester Royals (at New York, NY)	84-82	Win	17–12
Dec 29	@ Philadelphia Warriors	70-72	Loss	17–13
Jan 1	Boston Celtics	108-102	Win	18–13
Jan 2	Milwaukee Hawks	79-91	Loss	18–14
Jan 6	Minneapolis Lakers	106-117	Loss	18–15
Jan 8	@ Minneapolis Lakers	100-97	Win	19–15
Jan 9	@ Milwaukee Hawks	72-77	Loss	19–16
Jan 11	@ Minneapolis Lakers	82-93	Loss	19–17
Jan 13	Fort Wayne Pistons	100-83	Win	20–17
Jan 16	Rochester Royals	90-85	Win	21–17
Jan 19	Philadelphia Warriors (at Hershey, PA)	98-97 (OT)	Win	22–17
Jan 20	Boston Celtics	92-87	Win	23–17
Jan 23	New York Knicks	89-98	Loss	23–18
Jan 25	Fort Wayne Pistons (at Buffalo, NY)	66-69	Loss	23–19
Jan 26	Philadelphia Warriors (at Boston, MA)	107-99	Win	24–19
Jan 27	Fort Wayne Pistons	94-79	Win	25–19
Jan 28	@ Boston Celtics	90-101	Loss	25–20
Jan 30	Philadelphia Warriors	83-93	Loss	25–21
Feb 3	@ Fort Wayne Pistons	85-104	Loss	25–22
Feb 4	@ Boston Celtics	88-114	Loss	25–23
Feb 5	@ Rochester Royals	94-88	Win	26–23
Feb 6	New York Knicks	77-75	Win	27–23
Feb 8	Boston Celtics (at New York, NY)	115-88	Win	28–23
Feb 9	@ Boston Celtics	94-104	Loss	28–24
Feb 10	Minneapolis Lakers	85-81	Win	29–24
Feb 12	Milwaukee Hawks	92-66	Win	30–24
Feb 13	Rochester Royals	88-87	Win	31–24
Feb 14	Milwaukee Hawks (at Toledo, OH)	82-81	Win	32–24
Feb 17	Boston Celtics	107-93	Win	33–24
Feb 18	@ Philadelphia Warriors	86-110	Loss	33–25
Feb 19	@ New York Knicks	80-78	Win	34–25
Feb 20	New York Knicks	104-84	Win	35–25
Feb 22	Boston Celtics (at New York, NY)	95-97	Loss	35–26
Feb 24	Rochester Royals	97-83	Win	36–26
Feb 27	Philadelphia Warriors	105-77	Win	37–26
Mar 1	@ New York Knicks	105-102	Win	38–26
Mar 2	Fort Wayne Pistons (at Elkhart, IN)	103-90	Win	39–26
Mar 3	@ Fort Wayne Pistons	83-81	Win	40–26
Mar 4	@ Milwaukee Hawks	99-96	Win	41–26
Mar 6	Philadelphia Warriors	107-101	Win	42–26
Mar 9	@ Rochester Royals	97-100	Loss	42–27
Mar 10	Minneapolis Lakers (at New York, NY)	93-96	Loss	42–28
Mar 12	Fort Wayne Pistons	112-92	Win	43–28
Mar 13	Milwaukee Hawks	76-77	Loss	43–29

== Playoffs ==
1955 playoff game log
Division Finals: 3–1 (home: 2–0; road: 1–1)

Game	Date	Team	Score	High points	High rebounds	High assists	Location	Series
1	March 22	Boston	W 110–100	Red Kerr (27)	—	Paul Seymour (8)	Onondaga War Memorial	1–0
2	March 24	Boston	W 116–110	Dolph Schayes (22)	Dolph Schayes (18)	Paul Seymour (12)	Onondaga War Memorial	2–0
3	March 26	@ Boston	L 97–100 (OT)	Red Kerr (20)	Dolph Schayes (14)	George King (10)	Boston Garden	2–1
4	March 27	@ Boston	W 110–94	Dolph Schayes (28)	Earl Lloyd (18)	King, Seymour (8)	Boston Garden	3–1

NBA Finals: 4–3 (home: 4–0; road: 0–3)

Game	Date	Team	Score	High points	High assists	Location Attendance	Series
1	March 31	Fort Wayne	W 86–82	Red Rocha (19)	—	Onondaga War Memorial; 7,500	1–0
2	April 2	Fort Wayne	W 87–84	Dolph Schayes (24)	—	Onondaga War Memorial; 5,845	2–0
3	April 3	@ Fort Wayne	L 89–96	Rocha, Schayes (21)	—	Butler Fieldhouse; 3,200	2–1
4	April 5	@ Fort Wayne	L 102–109	Dolph Schayes (28)	—	Butler Fieldhouse; 2,611	2–2
5	April 7	@ Fort Wayne	L 71–74	Bill Kenville (15)	—	Butler Fieldhouse; 4,110	2–3
6	April 9	Fort Wayne	W 109–104	Dolph Schayes (28)	—	Onondaga War Memorial; 4,997	3–3
7	April 10	Fort Wayne	W 92–91	King, Kenville (15)	Paul Seymour (8)	Onondaga War Memorial; 6,697	4–3

1955 schedule

=== NBA Finals ===
In the Finals, the Nats would get off to a fast start; taking the first 2 games at home against the Fort Wayne Pistons. However, as home court shifted, the Pistons would spark back to life; taking all 3 games to take a 3–2 series lead. Heading back to Syracuse for Game 6 the Nats kept their Championship hopes alive by defeating the Pistons 109–104 to force a decisive game 7 at home. Game 7 would prove to be as tight as the entire series had played out to that point. As time started running out on the Pistons title hopes late in the 4th quarter of game 7 point guard George King sank a clutch free throw to give the Nats a 92–91 lead. King would then steal the inbound pass as time ticked away to clinch the NBA title for the Nationals.

== Awards and honors ==
- Dolph Schayes, All-NBA First Team
- Paul Seymour, All-NBA Third Team
