= 1954–55 Boston Celtics season =

NBA basketball team season

- Head coach: Red Auerbach
- Arena: Boston Arena; Boston Garden

Results
- Record: 36–36 (.500)
- Place: Division: 3rd (Eastern)
- Playoff finish: East Division finals (lost to Nationals 1–3)
- Stats at Basketball Reference

The 1954–55 Boston Celtics season was the Celtics' ninth season in the NBA. It was also the team's final season in which they played their home games secondarily at the Boston Arena, as the team would play home games exclusively at the Boston Garden beginning in the 1955–56 season.

During the early part of the season, the Celtics played two games against the Baltimore Bullets before the original Bullets team folded operations early in the season on November 27, 1954; both of the games played would be Celtics victories that ultimately ended up being wiped out from the official record books for the NBA's history. If the games played were officially kept as a part of the season's record for the Celtics, their official record would have had Boston get a winning record of 38–36 instead of a tied record of 36–36 for their season.

== Offseason ==
=== NBA draft ===
Round	Pick	Player	Position	Nationality	School/Club team
3	23	Henry Daubenschmidt	Center	USA	St. Francis (NY)

== Regular season ==
Eastern Division	W	L	PCT	GB	Home	Road	Neutral	Div
x-Syracuse Nationals	43	29	.597	–	25–7	10–17	8–5	21–15
x-New York Knicks	38	34	.528	5	17–9	8–17	13–8	15–21
x-Boston Celtics	36	36	.500	7	21–5	4–22	11–9	19–17
Philadelphia Warriors	33	39	.458	10	14–5	6–20	13–14	17–19

x = clinched playoff spot

=== Game log ===
1954–55 game log
#	Date	Opponent	Score	High points	Record
1	October 30	@ Rochester	95–98	Bill Sharman (24)	0–1
2	October 31	@ Fort Wayne	86–90	Cousy, Macauley (20)	0–2
3	November 6	@ Syracuse	107–84	Bob Cousy (24)	1–2
—	November 7	@ Baltimore	101–99	—	1–2
4	November 11	N Milwaukee	95–85	Bob Cousy (27)	1–3
—	November 13	Baltimore	113–118	—	1–3
5	November 16	Rochester	98–99	Ed Macauley (22)	2–3
6	November 20	@ New York	117–98	Bill Sharman (32)	3–3
7	November 21	@ Syracuse	104–110	Bob Cousy (26)	3–4
8	November 24	New York	103–108	Bob Cousy (29)	4–4
9	November 25	@ Philadelphia	98–103	Ed Macauley (20)	4–5
10	November 27	@ Rochester	101–107	Bill Sharman (28)	4–6
11	November 28	@ Minneapolis	108–115	Bob Cousy (21)	4–7
12	November 30	@ Milwaukee	118–99	Bob Cousy (34)	5–7
13	December 1	N Milwaukee	90–101	Bob Cousy (31)	6–7
14	December 2	@ Fort Wayne	98–116	Bill Sharman (23)	6–8
15	December 4	Rochester	102–110	Ed Macauley (27)	7–8
16	December 7	N Rochester	93–95	Bill Sharman (27)	8–8
17	December 8	Minneapolis	101–99	Ed Macauley (28)	8–9
18	December 9	@ Syracuse	107–120	Ed Macauley (24)	8–10
19	December 11	Syracuse	90–94	Bill Sharman (26)	9–10
20	December 12	@ Fort Wayne	99–100	Cousy, Sharman (21)	9–11
21	December 14	N Minneapolis	108–115	Ed Macauley (37)	10–11
22	December 15	Milwaukee	106–117	Bob Cousy (25)	11–11
23	December 18	Philadelphia	103–107	Bob Cousy (23)	12–11
24	December 19	@ New York	81–93	Ed Macauley (19)	12–12
25	December 25	@ Milwaukee	108–99	Bob Cousy (35)	13–12
26	December 26	@ Minneapolis	82–87	Bill Sharman (29)	13–13
27	December 29	N Minneapolis	129–118 (OT)	Cousy, Macauley (24)	13–14
28	December 31	N Philadelphia	113–119	Ed Macauley (30)	14–14
29	January 1	@ Syracuse	102–108	Frank Ramsey (26)	14–15
30	January 2	New York	96–113	Frank Ramsey (27)	15–15
31	January 6	@ New York	83–88	Bill Sharman (18)	15–16
32	January 8	Philadelphia	105–117	Don Barksdale (26)	16–16
33	January 9	Rochester	92–98	Don Barksdale (31)	17–16
34	January 11	@ Fort Wayne	119–110	Bill Sharman (37)	18–16
35	January 13	N New York	100–116	Bob Cousy (26)	19–16
36	January 14	Minneapolis	95–100	Ed Macauley (27)	20–16
37	January 16	New York	98–102	Bob Cousy (28)	21–16
38	January 19	N Fort Wayne	105–84	Bill Sharman (18)	21–17
39	January 20	@ Syracuse	87–92	Bill Sharman (26)	21–18
40	January 21	N Philadelphia	89–90	Bill Sharman (29)	22–18
41	January 22	@ Rochester	110–121	Bill Sharman (20)	22–19
42	January 23	Philadelphia	91–94 (OT)	Don Barksdale (20)	23–19
43	January 26	Fort Wayne	90–99	Ed Macauley (22)	24–19
44	January 27	N Rochester	98–92	Bob Cousy (27)	24–20
45	January 28	Syracuse	90–101	Bill Sharman (24)	25–20
46	January 30	Milwaukee	88–79	Bob Cousy (21)	25–21
47	February 2	N Philadelphia	122–107	Cousy, Nichols (26)	25–22
48	February 4	Syracuse	88–114	Ed Macauley (25)	26–22
49	February 5	@ New York	107–115	Bob Cousy (29)	26–23
50	February 6	Philadelphia	113–109	Bob Cousy (35)	26–24
51	February 8	N Syracuse	115–88	Bob Cousy (24)	26–25
52	February 9	Syracuse	94–104	Bob Cousy (33)	27–25
53	February 11	@ Philadelphia	101–105	Bob Cousy (33)	27–26
54	February 13	New York	105–103	Bob Cousy (31)	27–27
55	February 15	N Milwaukee	103–106 (OT)	Bob Cousy (34)	28–27
56	February 17	@ Syracuse	93–107	Bob Cousy (21)	28–28
57	February 20	Philadelphia	99–114	Ed Macauley (25)	29–28
58	February 22	N Syracuse	95–97	Ed Macauley (25)	30–28
59	February 23	N Milwaukee	120–103	Ed Macauley (19)	30–29
60	February 24	@ Minneapolis	98–112	Bill Sharman (23)	30–30
61	February 25	N Minneapolis	104–107	Bob Cousy (27)	31–30
62	February 27	N Milwaukee	57–62	Brannum, Cousy (14)	32–30
63	March 1	N Fort Wayne	118–98	Bob Cousy (31)	32–31
64	March 4	Minneapolis	121–106	Frank Ramsey (24)	32–32
65	March 5	@ Philadelphia	89–95	Bob Cousy (19)	32–33
66	March 6	Fort Wayne	104–108	Bob Cousy (31)	33–33
67	March 7	Fort Wayne	91–110	Bob Cousy (22)	34–33
68	March 8	N Philadelphia	103–112	Bob Cousy (40)	35–33
69	March 10	@ New York	95–114	Bob Cousy (22)	35–34
70	March 11	N New York	97–95	Bob Cousy (23)	35–35
71	March 12	@ Rochester	103–105	Bill Sharman (37)	35–36
72	March 13	New York	101–112	Bill Sharman (22)	36–36

== Playoffs ==
1955 playoff game log
Division Semi-finals: 2–1 (home: 1–0; road: 1–1)

Game	Date	Team	Score	High points	High assists	Location	Series
1	March 15	New York	W 122–101	Bob Cousy (30)	—	Boston Garden	1–0
2	March 16	@ New York	L 95–102	Bob Cousy (26)	—	Madison Square Garden III	1–1
3	March 19	@ New York	W 116–109	Bob Cousy (26)	Bob Cousy (10)	Madison Square Garden III	2–1

Division finals: 1–3 (home: 1–1; road: 0–2)

Game	Date	Team	Score	High points	High rebounds	High assists	Location	Series
1	March 22	@ Syracuse	L 100–110	Bill Sharman (20)	—	Bob Cousy (10)	Onondaga War Memorial	0–1
2	March 24	@ Syracuse	L 110–116	Bill Sharman (32)	Don Barksdale (10)	Bob Cousy (15)	Onondaga War Memorial	0–2
3	March 26	Syracuse	W 100–97 (OT)	Bob Cousy (23)	Bob Brannum (15)	Bob Cousy (8)	Boston Garden	1–2
4	March 27	Syracuse	L 94–110	Bill Sharman (29)	Bob Brannum (14)	Bob Cousy (9)	Boston Garden	1–3

1955 schedule

== Awards and records ==
- Bob Cousy, All-NBA First Team
- Bill Sharman, All-NBA Second Team
