= List of NBA career playoff triple-double leaders =

This article provides two lists:

A list of National Basketball Association (NBA) players by total career Playoffs triple-doubles recorded.

A progressive list of playoff triple-double leaders showing how the record increased through the years.

== Triple-double leaders ==
The following is a list of National Basketball Association players by total career Playoffs triple-doubles recorded.

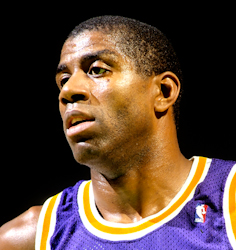
Magic Johnson has the most triple-doubles in NBA playoffs history.

^	Denotes active player
*	Inducted into the Naismith Memorial Basketball Hall of Fame
†	Not yet eligible for Hall of Fame consideration (Note: A player is not eligible for induction into the Naismith Memorial Basketball Hall of Fame until he has been fully retired for two calendar years.)

Statistics accurate as of the 2026 NBA playoffs.

Rank	Player	Position(s)	Playoff team(s) played for (years) (Note: American Basketball Association (ABA) teams other than those admitted into the NBA in 1976 are not included; each year is linked to an article about that particular NBA season. The years listed are only ones in which the player played in a playoff game.)	Total	Games played	Points per game (Note: Rounded to the nearest tenth.)	Rebounds per game	Assists per game
1	Magic Johnson*	PG	Los Angeles Lakers (1980–1991, 1996)	30	190	19.5	7.7	12.3
2	LeBron James^	SF	Cleveland Cavaliers (2006–2010, 2015–2018); Miami Heat (2011–2014); Los Angeles Lakers (2020–2021, 2023–2026)	28	302	28.2	8.9	7.2
3	Nikola Jokić^	C	Denver Nuggets (2019–2026)	23	100	27.4	12.4	7.7
4	Russell Westbrook^{†}	PG	Oklahoma City Thunder (2010–2014, 2016–2019); Houston Rockets (2020); Washington Wizards (2021); Los Angeles Clippers (2023–2024); Denver Nuggets (2025)	12	135	22.5	6.7	7.1
5	Jason Kidd*	PG	Phoenix Suns (1997–2001); New Jersey Nets (2002–2007); Dallas Mavericks (2008–2012); New York Knicks (2013)	11	158	12.9	6.7	8.0
6	Larry Bird*	SF/PF	Boston Celtics (1980–1988, 1990–1992)	10	164	23.8	10.3	6.5
6	Luka Dončić^	PG	Dallas Mavericks (2020–2022, 2024); Los Angeles Lakers (2025)	10	55	30.9	9.2	7.8
6	Draymond Green^	PF	Golden State Warriors (2013–2019, 2022–2023, 2025)	10	169	11.4	8.6	6.0
6	Rajon Rondo	PG	Boston Celtics (2008–2012); Dallas Mavericks (2015); Chicago Bulls (2017); New Orleans Pelicans (2018); Los Angeles Lakers (2020); Los Angeles Clippers (2021)	10	134	12.5	5.6	8.5
10	Wilt Chamberlain*	C	Philadelphia/San Francisco Warriors (1960–1962, 1964); Philadelphia 76ers (1965–1968); Los Angeles Lakers (1969–1973)	9	160	22.5	24.5	4.2
11	Oscar Robertson*	PG	Cincinnati Royals (1962–1967); Milwaukee Bucks (1971–1974)	8	86	22.2	6.7	8.8
12	John Havlicek*	SF	Boston Celtics (1963–1969, 1972–1977)	5	172	21.9	6.9	4.8
13	Giannis Antetokounmpo^	PF	Milwaukee Bucks (2015, 2017–2023, 2025)	4	84	27.0	12.2	5.3
13	Charles Barkley*	PF	Philadelphia 76ers (1985–1987, 1989–1991); Phoenix Suns (1993–1996); Houston Rockets (1997–1999)	4	123	23.0	12.9	3.9
13	Elgin Baylor*	SF	Minneapolis/Los Angeles Lakers (1959–1970)	4	134	27.0	– (Note: Rebounds not recorded for all of Baylor's playoff series.)	– (Note: Assists not recorded for all of Baylor's playoff series.)
13	Tim Duncan*	PF/C	San Antonio Spurs (1998–1999, 2001–2016)	4	251	20.6	11.4	3.0
13	Walt Frazier*	PG	New York Knicks (1968–1975)	4	93	20.7	7.2	6.4
13	James Harden^	SG/PG	Oklahoma City Thunder (2010–2012); Houston Rockets (2013–2020); Brooklyn Nets (2021); Philadelphia 76ers (2022–2023); Los Angeles Clippers (2024–2025); Cleveland Cavaliers (2026)	4	191	22.2	5.4	6.4
13	Scottie Pippen*	SF	Chicago Bulls (1987–1998); Houston Rockets (1999); Portland Trail Blazers (2000–2003)	4	208	17.5	7.6	5.0
20	Jimmy Butler^	SF/SG	Chicago Bulls (2012–2015, 2017); Minnesota Timberwolves (2018); Philadelphia 76ers (2019); Miami Heat (2020–2023); Golden State Warriors (2025)	3	130	21.1	6.2	4.7
20	Stephen Curry^	PG	Golden State Warriors (2013–2019, 2022–2023, 2025)	3	155	26.8	5.3	6.1
20	Clyde Drexler*	SG	Portland Trail Blazers (1984–1994); Houston Rockets (1995–1998)	3	145	20.4	6.9	6.1
20	Kevin Garnett*	PF	Minnesota Timberwolves (1997–2004); Boston Celtics (2008, 2010–2013); Brooklyn Nets (2014)	3	143	18.2	10.7	3.3
20	Tom Gola*	SF	Philadelphia Warriors (1956, 1958, 1960–1962)	3	39	11.1	10.0	4.5
20	Blake Griffin	PF	Los Angeles Clippers (2012–2017); Detroit Pistons (2019); Brooklyn Nets (2021–2022); Boston Celtics (2023)	3	68	18.2	7.7	3.5
20	Fat Lever	PG	Portland Trail Blazers (1983–1984); Denver Nuggets (1985–1990)	3	48	12.4	5.8	6.2
20	Chris Paul^{†}	PG	New Orleans Hornets (2008–2009, 2011); Los Angeles Clippers (2012–2017); Houston Rockets (2018–2019); Oklahoma City Thunder (2020); Phoenix Suns (2021–2023)	3	149	20.0	4.9	8.3
20	Bill Russell*	C	Boston Celtics (1957–1969)	3	165	16.2	24.9	– (Note: Assists not recorded for all of Russell's playoff series.)
20	Ben Simmons^	PG	Philadelphia 76ers (2018–2019, 2021); Los Angeles Clippers (2025)	3	39	12.2	7.2	6.6
20	Lenny Wilkens*	PG	St. Louis Hawks (1961, 1963–1968)	3	64	16.1	5.8	– (Note: Assists not recorded for all of Wilkens's playoff series.)
Rank	Name	Pos	Team(s) played for (years)	Total	Games played	Points per game	Rebounds per game	Assists per game

== Progressive list of triple-double leaders ==
This is a progressive list of triple-double leaders showing how the record increased through the years.

Statistics accurate as of the 2026 NBA playoffs.

^	Active NBA player
*	Inducted into the Naismith Memorial Basketball Hall of Fame
§	1st time eligible for Hall of Fame in 2027

Team abbreviationsTeam(s) listed indicates the team(s) the player was on when the player established the record.
ATL	Atlanta Hawks	CLE	Cleveland Cavaliers	KCK	Kansas City Kings	MIN	Minnesota Timberwolves	PHW	Philadelphia Warriors	SYR	Syracuse Nationals
BAL	Baltimore Bullets	DEN	Denver Nuggets	LAC	Los Angeles Clippers	NJN	New Jersey Nets	PHX	Phoenix Suns	UTA	Utah Jazz
BOS	Boston Celtics	DET	Detroit Pistons	LAL	Los Angeles Lakers	NOH	New Orleans Hornets	POR	Portland Trail Blazers	WAS	Washington Wizards
BUF	Buffalo Braves	GSW	Golden State Warriors	MEM	Memphis Grizzlies	NYK	New York Knicks	SAC	Sacramento Kings		
CHI	Chicago Bulls	HOU	Houston Rockets	MIA	Miami Heat	OKC	Oklahoma City Thunder	SAS	San Antonio Spurs		
CIN	Cincinnati Royals	IND	Indiana Pacers	MIL	Milwaukee Bucks	PHI	Philadelphia 76ers	STL	St. Louis Hawks		

Triple-doubles leader at the end of every season
Season	Year-by-year leader	TD3	Active player leader	TD3	Career record	TD3	Single season record	TD3	Season
1950–51	none	0	none	0	none	0	none	0	1950–51
1951–52	Dick McGuire*NYK	1	Dick McGuire*NYK	1	Dick McGuire*NYK	1	Dick McGuire*NYK	1	1951–52
1952–53	none	0	Dick McGuire*NYK	1	Dick McGuire*NYK	1	Dick McGuire*NYK	1	1952–53
1953–54	Jack NicholsBOS	1	Dick McGuire*NYK Jack NicholsBOS	1	Dick McGuire*NYK Jack NicholsBOS	1	Dick McGuire*NYK Jack NicholsBOS	1	1953–54
1954–55	none	0	Dick McGuire*NYK Jack NicholsBOS	1	Dick McGuire*NYK Jack NicholsBOS	1	Dick McGuire*NYK Jack NicholsBOS	1	1954–55
1955–56	George KingSYR Tom Gola*PHW	1	Dick McGuire*NYK Jack NicholsBOS; George KingSYR Tom Gola*PHW	1	Dick McGuire*NYK Jack NicholsBOS; George KingSYR Tom Gola*PHW	1	Dick McGuire*NYK Jack NicholsBOS; George KingSYR Tom Gola*PHW	1	1955–56
1956–57	none	0	Dick McGuire*NYK Jack NicholsBOS	1	Dick McGuire*NYK Jack NicholsBOS; George KingSYR Tom Gola*PHW	1	Dick McGuire*NYK Jack NicholsBOS; George KingSYR Tom Gola*PHW	1	1956–57
1957–58	Bob Cousy*BOS	1	Dick McGuire*DET Jack NicholsBOS; George KingSYR Tom Gola*PHW; Bob Cousy*BOS	1	Dick McGuire*DET Jack NicholsBOS; George KingSYR Tom Gola*PHW; Bob Cousy*BOS	1	Dick McGuire*DET Jack NicholsBOS; George KingSYR Tom Gola*PHW; Bob Cousy*BOS	1	1957–58
1958–59	Bob Cousy*BOS	1	Bob Cousy*BOS	2	Bob Cousy*BOS	2	Dick McGuire*DET Jack NicholsBOS; George KingSYR Tom Gola*PHW; Bob Cousy*BOS	1	1958–59
1959–60	Tom Gola*PHW	2	Tom Gola*PHW	3	Tom Gola*PHW	3	Tom Gola*PHW	2	1959–60
1960–61	Elgin Baylor*LAL	1	Tom Gola*PHW	3	Tom Gola*PHW	3	Tom Gola*PHW	2	1960–61
1961–62	Oscar Robertson*CIN; Guy Rodgers*PHW; Bill Russell*BOS	1	Tom Gola*PHW	3	Tom Gola*PHW	3	Tom Gola*PHW	2	1961–62
1962–63	Oscar Robertson*CIN	5	Oscar Robertson*CIN	6	Oscar Robertson*CIN	6	Oscar Robertson*CIN	5	1962–63
1963–64	Jerry Lucas*CIN; Elgin Baylor*LAL; Oscar Robertson*CIN	1	Oscar Robertson*CIN	7	Oscar Robertson*CIN	7	Oscar Robertson*CIN	5	1963–64
1964–65	Bill Russell*BOS; Wilt Chamberlain*PHI	1	Oscar Robertson*CIN	7	Oscar Robertson*CIN	7	Oscar Robertson*CIN	5	1964–65
1965–66	Lenny Wilkens*STL; Bill Russell*BOS; Oscar Robertson*CIN	1	Oscar Robertson*CIN	8	Oscar Robertson*CIN	8	Oscar Robertson*CIN	5	1965–66
1966–67	Wilt Chamberlain*PHI	7	Wilt Chamberlain*PHI; Oscar Robertson*CIN	8	Wilt Chamberlain*PHI; Oscar Robertson*CIN	8	Wilt Chamberlain*PHI	7	1966–67
1967–68	John Havlicek*BOS	2	Wilt Chamberlain*PHI; Oscar Robertson*CIN	8	Wilt Chamberlain*PHI; Oscar Robertson*CIN	8	Wilt Chamberlain*PHI	7	1967–68
1968–69	John Havlicek*BOS	2	Wilt Chamberlain*PHI; Oscar Robertson*CIN	8	Wilt Chamberlain*PHI; Oscar Robertson*CIN	8	Wilt Chamberlain*PHI	7	1968–69
1969–70	Walt Frazier*NYK	2	Wilt Chamberlain*LAL	9	Wilt Chamberlain*LAL	9	Wilt Chamberlain*PHI	7	1969–70
1970–71	Billy Cunningham*PHI; Wes Unseld*BAL	1	Wilt Chamberlain*LAL	9	Wilt Chamberlain*LAL	9	Wilt Chamberlain*PHI	7	1970–71
1971–72	Walt Frazier*NYK; John Havlicek*BOS	1	Wilt Chamberlain*LAL	9	Wilt Chamberlain*LAL	9	Wilt Chamberlain*PHI	7	1971–72
1972–73	none	0	Wilt Chamberlain*LAL	9	Wilt Chamberlain*LAL	9	Wilt Chamberlain*PHI	7	1972–73
1973–74	none	0	Oscar Robertson*MIL	8	Wilt Chamberlain*LAL	9	Wilt Chamberlain*PHI	7	1973–74
1974–75	none	0	John Havlicek*BOS	5	Wilt Chamberlain*LAL	9	Wilt Chamberlain*PHI	7	1974–75
1975–76	Dave Cowens*BOS Randy SmithBUF	1	John Havlicek*BOS	5	Wilt Chamberlain*LAL	9	Wilt Chamberlain*PHI	7	1975–76
1976–77	Bill Walton*POR	1	John Havlicek*BOS	5	Wilt Chamberlain*LAL	9	Wilt Chamberlain*PHI	7	1976–77
1977–78	none	0	John Havlicek*BOS	5	Wilt Chamberlain*LAL	9	Wilt Chamberlain*PHI	7	1977–78
1978–79	none	0	Walt Frazier*NYK	4	Wilt Chamberlain*LAL	9	Wilt Chamberlain*PHI	7	1978–79
1979–80	Magic Johnson*LAL	5	Magic Johnson*LAL	5	Wilt Chamberlain*LAL	9	Wilt Chamberlain*PHI	7	1979–80
1980–81	Larry Bird*BOS Sam LaceyKCK	3	Magic Johnson*LAL	5	Wilt Chamberlain*LAL	9	Wilt Chamberlain*PHI	7	1980–81
1981–82	Magic Johnson*LAL	6	Magic Johnson*LAL	11	Magic Johnson*LAL	11	Wilt Chamberlain*PHI	7	1981–82
1982–83	Magic Johnson*LAL	2	Magic Johnson*LAL	13	Magic Johnson*LAL	13	Wilt Chamberlain*PHI	7	1982–83
1983–84	Magic Johnson*LAL	5	Magic Johnson*LAL	18	Magic Johnson*LAL	18	Wilt Chamberlain*PHI	7	1983–84
1984–85	Clyde Drexler*POR; Magic Johnson*LAL	2	Magic Johnson*LAL	20	Magic Johnson*LAL	20	Wilt Chamberlain*PHI	7	1984–85
1985–86	Larry Bird*BOS; Magic Johnson*LAL	3	Magic Johnson*LAL	23	Magic Johnson*LAL	23	Wilt Chamberlain*PHI	7	1985–86
1986–87	Magic Johnson*LAL	3	Magic Johnson*LAL	26	Magic Johnson*LAL	26	Wilt Chamberlain*PHI	7	1986–87
1987–88	Dennis Johnson*BOS Fat LeverDEN James Worthy*LAL	1	Magic Johnson*LAL	26	Magic Johnson*LAL	26	Wilt Chamberlain*PHI	7	1987–88
1988–89	Michael Jordan*CHI Fat LeverDEN Isiah Thomas*DET	1	Magic Johnson*LAL	26	Magic Johnson*LAL	26	Wilt Chamberlain*PHI	7	1988–89
1989–90	Larry Bird*BOS; Hakeem Olajuwon*HOU; Scottie Pippen*CHI	1	Magic Johnson*LAL	26	Magic Johnson*LAL	26	Wilt Chamberlain*PHI	7	1989–90
1990–91	Magic Johnson*LAL	4	Magic Johnson*LAL	30	Magic Johnson*LAL	30	Wilt Chamberlain*PHI	7	1990–91
1991–92	Scottie Pippen*CHI	1	Larry Bird*BOS	10	Magic Johnson*LAL	30	Wilt Chamberlain*PHI	7	1991–92
1992–93	Charles Barkley*PHX	2	Charles Barkley*PHX	4	Magic Johnson*LAL	30	Wilt Chamberlain*PHI	7	1992–93
1993–94	Mookie BlaylockATL	2	Charles Barkley*PHX	4	Magic Johnson*LAL	30	Wilt Chamberlain*PHI	7	1993–94
1994–95	none	0	Charles Barkley*PHX	4	Magic Johnson*LAL	30	Wilt Chamberlain*PHI	7	1994–95
1995–96	Scottie Pippen*CHI	1	Magic Johnson*LAL	30	Magic Johnson*LAL	30	Wilt Chamberlain*PHI	7	1995–96
1996–97	none	0	Charles Barkley*PHX; Scottie Pippen*CHI	4	Magic Johnson*LAL	30	Wilt Chamberlain*PHI	7	1996–97
1997–98	Mark JacksonIND	1	Charles Barkley*PHX; Scottie Pippen*CHI	4	Magic Johnson*LAL	30	Wilt Chamberlain*PHI	7	1997–98
1998–99	none	0	Charles Barkley*PHX; Scottie Pippen*CHI	4	Magic Johnson*LAL	30	Wilt Chamberlain*PHI	7	1998–99
1999–00	Kevin Garnett*MIN	2	Charles Barkley*PHX; Scottie Pippen*CHI	4	Magic Johnson*LAL	30	Wilt Chamberlain*PHI	7	1999–00
2000–01	John Stockton*UTA	1	Scottie Pippen*CHI	4	Magic Johnson*LAL	30	Wilt Chamberlain*PHI	7	2000–01
2001–02	Jason Kidd*NJN	4	Jason Kidd*NJN	5	Magic Johnson*LAL	30	Wilt Chamberlain*PHI	7	2001–02
2002–03	Tim Duncan*SAS	2	Jason Kidd*NJN	6	Magic Johnson*LAL	30	Wilt Chamberlain*PHI	7	2002–03
2003–04	Steve FrancisHOU Kevin Garnett*MIN; Jason Kidd*NJN; Chris Webber*SAC	1	Jason Kidd*NJN	7	Magic Johnson*LAL	30	Wilt Chamberlain*PHI	7	2003–04
2004–05	Jason Kidd*NJN; Steve Nash*PHX	1	Jason Kidd*NJN	8	Magic Johnson*LAL	30	Wilt Chamberlain*PHI	7	2004–05
2005–06	LeBron James^CLE	2	Jason Kidd*NJN	9	Magic Johnson*LAL	30	Wilt Chamberlain*PHI	7	2005–06
2006–07	Jason Kidd*NJN	2	Jason Kidd*NJN	11	Magic Johnson*LAL	30	Wilt Chamberlain*PHI	7	2006–07
2007–08	Tim Duncan*SAS LeBron James^CLE Chris Paul^{†}NOH	1	Jason Kidd*NJN	11	Magic Johnson*LAL	30	Wilt Chamberlain*PHI	7	2007–08
2008–09	Rajon RondoBOS	3	Jason Kidd*NJN	11	Magic Johnson*LAL	30	Wilt Chamberlain*PHI	7	2008–09
2009–10	LeBron James^CLE Rajon RondoBOS	2	Jason Kidd*NJN	11	Magic Johnson*LAL	30	Wilt Chamberlain*PHI	7	2009–10
2010–11	LeBron James^MIA Chris Paul^{†}NOH Rajon RondoBOS Russell Westbrook^{†}OKC	1	Jason Kidd*NJN	11	Magic Johnson*LAL	30	Wilt Chamberlain*PHI	7	2010–11
2011–12	Rajon RondoBOS	4	Jason Kidd*NJN	11	Magic Johnson*LAL	30	Wilt Chamberlain*PHI	7	2011–12
2012–13	LeBron James^MIA	3	LeBron James^MIA Jason Kidd*NJN	11	Magic Johnson*LAL	30	Wilt Chamberlain*PHI	7	2012–13
2013–14	Russell Westbrook^{†}OKC	3	LeBron James^ MIA 2013–14; CLE 2014–18; LAL 2018–26	11	Magic Johnson*LAL	30	Wilt Chamberlain*PHI	7	2013–14
2014–15	Blake GriffinLAC LeBron James^CLE	3	LeBron James^ MIA 2013–14; CLE 2014–18; LAL 2018–26	14	Magic Johnson*LAL	30	Wilt Chamberlain*PHI	7	2014–15
2015–16	LeBron James^CLE	2	LeBron James^ MIA 2013–14; CLE 2014–18; LAL 2018–26	16	Magic Johnson*LAL	30	Wilt Chamberlain*PHI	7	2015–16
2016–17	LeBron James^CLE Russell Westbrook^OKC	3	LeBron James^ MIA 2013–14; CLE 2014–18; LAL 2018–26	19	Magic Johnson*LAL	30	Wilt Chamberlain*PHI	7	2016–17
2017–18	LeBron James^CLE	4	LeBron James^ MIA 2013–14; CLE 2014–18; LAL 2018–26	23	Magic Johnson*LAL	30	Wilt Chamberlain*PHI	7	2017–18
2018–19	Draymond Green^GSW	6	LeBron James^ MIA 2013–14; CLE 2014–18; LAL 2018–26	23	Magic Johnson*LAL	30	Wilt Chamberlain*PHI	7	2018–19
2019–20	LeBron James^LAL	5	LeBron James^ MIA 2013–14; CLE 2014–18; LAL 2018–26	28	Magic Johnson*LAL	30	Wilt Chamberlain*PHI	7	2019–20
2020–21	Russell Westbrook^{†}WAS	2	LeBron James^ MIA 2013–14; CLE 2014–18; LAL 2018–26	28	Magic Johnson*LAL	30	Wilt Chamberlain*PHI	7	2020–21
2021–22	Giannis Antetokounmpo^MIL; Ja Morant^MEM	1	LeBron James^ MIA 2013–14; CLE 2014–18; LAL 2018–26	28	Magic Johnson*LAL	30	Wilt Chamberlain*PHI	7	2021–22
2022–23	Nikola Jokić^DEN	10	LeBron James^ MIA 2013–14; CLE 2014–18; LAL 2018–26	28	Magic Johnson*LAL	30	Nikola Jokić^DEN	10	2022–23
2023–24	Luka Dončić^DAL	7	LeBron James^ MIA 2013–14; CLE 2014–18; LAL 2018–26	28	Magic Johnson*LAL	30	Nikola Jokić^DEN	10	2023–24
2024–25	Nikola Jokić^DEN	3	LeBron James^ MIA 2013–14; CLE 2014–18; LAL 2018–26	28	Magic Johnson*LAL	30	Nikola Jokić^DEN	10	2024–25
2025–26	Nikola Jokić^DEN; Karl-Anthony Towns^NYK	2	LeBron James^ MIA 2013–14; CLE 2014–18; LAL 2018–26	28	Magic Johnson*LAL	30	Nikola Jokić^DEN	10	2025–26
Season	Year-by-year leader	TD3	Active player leader	TD3	Career record	TD3	Single season record	TD3	Season

== See also ==
- Basketball statistics
- NBA post-season records
