= List of NBA annual free throw scoring leaders =

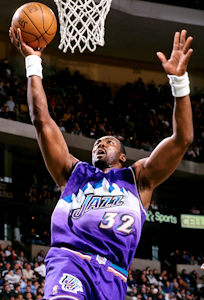
Karl Malone led the NBA in free throw scoring for a record 8 seasons.

In basketball, a free throw is an unopposed attempt to score points from behind the free throw line. The National Basketball Association's (NBA) free throw scoring leader is the player with the highest average of free throws made per game in a given season. To qualify as a free throw scoring leader, the player must have at least 125 free throws made. Aside from the strike shortened 1998–99 NBA season and 2011–12 NBA season, this has been the entry criteria since the 1974–75 NBA season.

Jerry West holds the record for highest free throw scoring average in a season which he accomplished with the Los Angeles Lakers in the 1965–66 NBA season with 10.63 free throws made per game. West also holds the record for most free throws made in single season (840) which he accomplished with the Los Angeles Lakers in the 1965–66 NBA season.

Karl Malone has led the league in free throw scoring a record eight times. James Harden has led the league seven times, while Neil Johnston and Oscar Robertson have each done it four times. Ten players led the league in free throw scoring three times. Six players led the league in free throw scoring two times.

== Key ==
^		Denotes player who is still active in the NBA			
*		Inducted into the Naismith Memorial Basketball Hall of Fame			
‡		Denotes player who won the scoring title that year			
Player (X)		Denotes the number of times the player had been the scoring leader up to and including that season			
G	Guard	F	Forward	C	Center

== Annual leaders ==
Season	Player	Pos (Note: The player's primary position is listed first.)	Team	GP	Free throws made	Free throws made per game	Free throw percentage	Ref
1946–47 ‡	Joe Fulks*	F	Philadelphia Warriors	60	439	7.32	.730	
1947–48	Joe Fulks* (2)	F	Philadelphia Warriors	43	297	6.91	.762	
1948–49 ‡	George Mikan*	C	Minneapolis Lakers	60	532	8.87	.772	
1949–50 ‡	George Mikan* (2)	C	Minneapolis Lakers	68	567	8.34	.779	
1950–51 ‡	George Mikan* (3)	C	Minneapolis Lakers	68	576	8.47	.803	
1951–52 ‡	Paul Arizin*	F	Philadelphia Warriors	66	578	8.76	.818	
1952–53 ‡	Neil Johnston*	C	Philadelphia Warriors	70	556	7.94	.700	
1953–54 ‡	Neil Johnston* (2)	C	Philadelphia Warriors	72	577	8.01	.747	
1954–55 ‡	Neil Johnston* (3)	C	Philadelphia Warriors	72	589	8.18	.766	
1955–56	Neil Johnston* (4)	C	Philadelphia Warriors	70	549	7.84	.801	
1956–57	Dolph Schayes*	F	Syracuse Nationals	72	625	8.68	.904	
1957–58 ‡	George Yardley*	F	Detroit Pistons	72	655	9.10	.811	
1958–59 ‡	Bob Pettit*	F/C	St. Louis Hawks	72	667	9.26	.759	
1959–60	Elgin Baylor*	F	Minneapolis Lakers	70	564	8.06	.732	
1960–61	Elgin Baylor* (2)	F	Los Angeles Lakers	73	676	9.26	.783	
1961–62 ‡	Wilt Chamberlain*	C	Philadelphia Warriors	80	835	10.44	.613	
1962–63	Bob Pettit* (2)	F/C	St. Louis Hawks	79	685	8.67	.774	
1963–64	Oscar Robertson*	G	Cincinnati Royals	79	800	10.13	.853	
1964–65	Oscar Robertson* (2)	G	Cincinnati Royals	75	665	8.87	.839	
1965–66	Jerry West*	G	Los Angeles Lakers	79	840	10.63	.860	
1966–67 ‡	Rick Barry*	F	San Francisco Warriors	78	753	9.65	.884	
1967–68	Oscar Robertson* (3)	G	Cincinnati Royals	65	576	8.86	.873	
1968–69	Oscar Robertson* (4)	G	Cincinnati Royals	79	643	8.14	.838	
1969–70 ‡	Jerry West* (2)	G	Los Angeles Lakers	74	647	8.74	.824	
1970–71	Dave Bing*	G	Detroit Pistons	82	615	7.50	.797	
1971–72	Tiny Archibald*	G	Cincinnati Royals	76	677	8.91	.822	
1972–73 ‡	Tiny Archibald* (2)	G	Kansas City-Omaha Kings	80	663	8.29	.847	
1973–74 ‡	Bob McAdoo*	C/F	Buffalo Braves	74	459	6.20	.793	
1974–75	Tiny Archibald* (3)	G	Kansas City-Omaha Kings	82	652	7.95	.872	
1975–76 ‡	Bob McAdoo* (2)	C/F	Buffalo Braves	78	559	7.17	.762	
1976–77 ‡	Pete Maravich*	G	New Orleans Jazz	73	501	6.86	.835	
1977–78	Adrian Dantley*	F	Indiana Pacers; Los Angeles Lakers	79	541	6.85	.796	
1978–79	World B. Free	G	San Diego Clippers	78	654	8.38	.756	
1979–80	World B. Free (2)	G	San Diego Clippers	68	572	8.41	.753	
1980–81	World B. Free (3)	G	Golden State Warriors	65	528	8.12	.814	
1981–82	Adrian Dantley* (2)	F	Utah Jazz	81	648	8.00	.792	
1982–83	Moses Malone*	C	Philadelphia 76ers	78	600	7.69	.761	
1983–84 ‡	Adrian Dantley* (3)	F	Utah Jazz	79	813	10.29	.859	
1984–85	Moses Malone* (2)	C	Philadelphia 76ers	79	737	9.33	.815	
1985–86	Moses Malone* (3)	C	Philadelphia 76ers	74	617	8.34	.787	
1986–87 ‡	Michael Jordan*	G	Chicago Bulls	82	833	10.16	.857	
1987–88	Charles Barkley*	F	Philadelphia 76ers	80	714	8.93	.751	
1988–89	Karl Malone*	F	Utah Jazz	80	703	8.79	.766	
1989–90	Karl Malone* (2)	F	Utah Jazz	82	696	8.49	.762	
1990–91	Karl Malone* (3)	F	Utah Jazz	82	684	8.34	.770	
1991–92	Karl Malone* (4)	F	Utah Jazz	81	673	8.31	.778	
1992–93	Karl Malone* (5)	F	Utah Jazz	82	619	7.55	.740	
1993–94 ‡	David Robinson*	C	San Antonio Spurs	80	693	8.66	.749	
1994–95	David Robinson* (2)	C	San Antonio Spurs	81	656	8.10	.774	
1995–96	David Robinson* (3)	C	San Antonio Spurs	82	626	7.63	.761	
1996–97	Karl Malone* (6)	F	Utah Jazz	82	521	6.35	.775	
1997–98	Karl Malone* (7)	F	Utah Jazz	81	628	7.75	.761	
1998–99 (Note: The 1998–99 NBA season was shortened to 50 games due to the league's lockout. The qualification of this season's scoring title is to appear in at least 43 games (out of 50) or to have at least 854 points.)	Karl Malone* (8)	F	Utah Jazz	49	378	7.71	.788	
1999–00	Jerry Stackhouse	G/F	Detroit Pistons	82	618	7.54	.815	
2000–01	Jerry Stackhouse (2)	G/F	Detroit Pistons	80	666	8.33	.822	
2001–02 ‡	Allen Iverson*	G	Philadelphia 76ers	60	475	7.92	.812	
2002–03 ‡	Tracy McGrady*	G/F	Orlando Magic	75	576	7.68	.793	
2003–04	Corey Maggette	G/F	Los Angeles Clippers	73	526	7.21	.848	
2004–05 ‡	Allen Iverson* (2)	G	Philadelphia 76ers	75	656	8.75	.835	
2005–06	Allen Iverson* (3)	G	Philadelphia 76ers	72	675	9.38	.814	
2006–07 ‡	Kobe Bryant*	G	Los Angeles Lakers	77	667	8.66	.868	
2007–08	Kevin Martin	G	Sacramento Kings	61	502	8.23	.869	
2008–09 ‡	Dwyane Wade*	G	Miami Heat	79	590	7.47	.765	
2009–10 ‡	Kevin Durant^	F	Oklahoma City Thunder	82	756	9.22	.900	
2010–11 ‡	Kevin Durant^ (2)	F	Oklahoma City Thunder	78	594	7.62	.880	
2011–12 (Note: The 2011–12 NBA season was shortened to 66 games due to the league's lockout. The qualification of this season's free throw scoring title is to appear in at least 56 games (out of 66).)	Kevin Love^	F	Minnesota Timberwolves	55	379	6.89	.824	
2012–13	James Harden^	G	Houston Rockets	78	674	8.64	.851	
2013–14 ‡	Kevin Durant^ (3)	F	Oklahoma City Thunder	81	703	8.68	.873	
2014–15	James Harden^ (2)	G	Houston Rockets	81	715	8.83	.868	
2015–16	James Harden^ (3)	G	Houston Rockets	82	720	8.78	.860	
2016–17	James Harden^ (4)	G	Houston Rockets	81	746	9.21	.847	
2017–18 ‡	James Harden^ (5)	G	Houston Rockets	72	624	8.67	.858	
2018–19 ‡	James Harden^ (6)	G	Houston Rockets	78	754	9.67	.879	
2019–20 ‡	James Harden^ (7)	G	Houston Rockets	68	692	10.18	.865	
2020–21	Joel Embiid^	C	Philadelphia 76ers	51	471	9.24	.859	
2021–22 ‡	Joel Embiid^ (2)	C	Philadelphia 76ers	68	654	9.62	.814	
2022–23 ‡	Joel Embiid^ (3)	C	Philadelphia 76ers	66	661	10.02	.857	
2023–24	Shai Gilgeous-Alexander^	G	Oklahoma City Thunder	75	567	7.56	.874	
2024–25 ‡	Shai Gilgeous-Alexander^ (2)	G	Oklahoma City Thunder	76	601	7.91	.898	
2025–26	Shai Gilgeous-Alexander^ (3)	G	Oklahoma City Thunder	68	540	7.94	.879	

== Multiple-time leaders ==
Rank	Player	Team	Times leader	Years
1	Karl Malone	Utah Jazz	8	1989, 1990, 1991, 1992, 1993, 1997, 1998, 1999
2	James Harden	Houston Rockets	7	2013, 2015, 2016, 2017, 2018, 2019, 2020
3	Neil Johnston	Philadelphia Warriors	4	1953, 1954, 1955, 1956
3	Oscar Robertson	Cincinnati Royals	4	1964, 1965, 1968, 1969
5	Tiny Archibald	Cincinnati Royals/Kansas City-Omaha Kings	3	1972, 1973, 1975
5	Adrian Dantley	Los Angeles Lakers (1) / Utah Jazz (2)	3	1978, 1982, 1984
5	Kevin Durant	Oklahoma City Thunder	3	2010, 2011, 2014
5	Joel Embiid	Philadelphia 76ers	3	2021, 2022, 2023
5	World B. Free	San Diego Clippers (2) / Golden State Warriors (1)	3	1979, 1980, 1981
5	Shai Gilgeous-Alexander	Oklahoma City Thunder	3	2024, 2025, 2026
5	Allen Iverson	Philadelphia 76ers	3	2002, 2005, 2006
5	George Mikan	Minneapolis Lakers	3	1949, 1950, 1951
5	Moses Malone	Philadelphia 76ers	3	1983, 1985, 1986
5	David Robinson	San Antonio Spurs	3	1994, 1995, 1996
15	Elgin Baylor	Minneapolis Lakers/Los Angeles Lakers	2	1960, 1961
15	Joe Fulks	Philadelphia Warriors	2	1947, 1948
15	Bob McAdoo	Buffalo Braves	2	1974, 1976
15	Bob Pettit	St. Louis Hawks	2	1959, 1963
15	Jerry Stackhouse	Detroit Pistons	2	2000, 2001
15	Jerry West	Los Angeles Lakers	2	1966, 1970

== See also ==
- NBA records
- List of NBA career free throw percentage leaders
- List of NBA career free throw scoring leaders
- List of NBA annual field goal percentage leaders
- List of NBA annual scoring leaders
