= 1955–56 St. Louis Hawks season =

NBA professional basketball team season

- Head coach: Red Holzman
- Arena: Kiel Auditorium

Results
- Record: 33–39 (.458)
- Place: Division: 3rd (Western)
- Playoff finish: West Division Finals (lost to Pistons 2–3)
- Stats at Basketball Reference

Local media
- Television: KTVI
- Radio: KMOX

The 1955–56 St. Louis Hawks season was the 10th season for the franchise and the first in St. Louis, Missouri. Formerly, the team had played in Milwaukee, but they elected to relocated to St. Louis after four last-place seasons in Milwaukee. They participated in the draft for the final time under the Milwaukee Hawks name, selecting Dick Ricketts with the first overall pick. St. Louis had once been home to the St. Louis Bombers, an early BAA franchise that folded in 1950. The Hawks were on the verge of becoming one of the top teams in the NBA, led by second year forward Bob Pettit, who would earn the very first MVP award in NBA history. The Hawks would finish in third place with a 33–39 record.

In the playoffs against the Minneapolis Lakers, the Hawks were triumphant in Game 1 by a single point. Game 2 was played in Minneapolis, and the Hawks were blown out by 58 points in Game 2—the Hawks' worst playoff loss in franchise history to date. The third game was contested in St. Louis. Once again, the Hawks would win by 1 point to advance to the Western Finals. In the three games, the Hawks were outscored by 56 points. In the Western Finals, the Hawks would win the first 2 games against the Fort Wayne Pistons. However, the Pistons would rebound to take the next 3 games and win the series.

== Regular season ==
=== Season standings ===
Western Division	W	L	PCT	GB	Home	Road	Neutral	Div
x-Fort Wayne Pistons	37	35	.514	-	19-7	10-17	8-11	19-17
x-Minneapolis Lakers	33	39	.458	4	14-12	6-21	13-6	19-17
x-St. Louis Hawks	33	39	.458	4	15-11	11-17	7-11	18-18
Rochester Royals	31	41	.431	6	15-14	6-21	10-6	16-20

== Game log ==
1955–56 Game log
#	Date	Opponent	Score	High points	Record
1	November 5	Minneapolis	W 101–89	Pettit, Selvy (21)	1–0
2	November 12	Syracuse	L 81–91	Bob Pettit (32)	1–1
3	November 15	New York	W 121–95	Bob Pettit (23)	2–1
4	November 19	@ New York	W 104–91	Bob Pettit (33)	3–1
5	November 20	@ Syracuse	L 80–84	Chuck Share (20)	3–2
6	November 23	Rochester	W 90–88 (OT)	Pettit, Share (20)	4–2
7	November 24	@ Minneapolis	L 99–107	Bob Pettit (20)	4–3
8	November 26	Minneapolis	W 104–95	Pettit, Selvy (20)	5–3
9	November 27	@ Fort Wayne	L 106–114 (OT)	Bob Pettit (27)	5–4
10	November 29	Philadelphia	W 108–95	Bob Pettit (40)	6–4
11	November 30	vs. Minneapolis	W 99–97	Bob Harrison (19)	7–4
12	December 1	@ Philadelphia	L 98–115	Bob Pettit (22)	7–5
13	December 2	@ Boston	L 81–94	Bob Pettit (24)	7–6
14	December 3	@ Rochester	W 89–78	Bob Pettit (25)	8–6
15	December 6	Boston	L 99–122	Bob Pettit (24)	8–7
16	December 10	New York	L 80–99	Bob Pettit (20)	8–8
17	December 11	@ Rochester	L 91–93	Bob Pettit (30)	8–9
18	December 14	vs. Rochester	L 109–117	Bob Pettit (34)	8–10
19	December 16	vs. Rochester	W 100–97 (OT)	Bob Pettit (23)	9–10
20	December 18	Rochester	W 86–85	Bob Pettit (26)	10–10
21	December 26	vs. Fort Wayne	L 67–83	Bob Harrison (12)	10–11
22	December 27	Boston	L 102–105	Bob Pettit (46)	10–12
23	December 28	@ Minneapolis	W 111–90	Bob Pettit (33)	11–12
24	December 29	vs. Minneapolis	L 71–74	Bob Pettit (20)	11–13
25	December 30	vs. Fort Wayne	L 89–90	Jack Stephens (21)	11–14
26	January 1	@ Fort Wayne	L 68–85	Bob Schafer (17)	11–15
27	January 2	Syracuse	L 82–84	Chuck Share (20)	11–16
28	January 4	@ Minneapolis	L 76–94	Bob Pettit (27)	11–17
29	January 7	Fort Wayne	L 97–108	Bob Pettit (22)	11–18
30	January 8	@ Fort Wayne	W 96–91	Bob Pettit (21)	12–18
31	January 10	@ Philadelphia	L 107–109 (OT)	Bob Pettit (26)	12–19
32	January 12	@ Syracuse	L 78–93	Chuck Share (13)	12–20
33	January 13	vs. Rochester	L 90–98	Bob Pettit (20)	12–21
34	January 14	@ New York	W 104–101 (2OT)	Jack McMahon (29)	13–21
35	January 15	Philadelphia	L 96–108	Bob Pettit (23)	13–22
36	January 17	vs. Minneapolis	L 86–97	Chuck Share (21)	13–23
37	January 19	vs. Fort Wayne	L 83–90	Bob Pettit (25)	13–24
38	January 20	@ Boston	L 112–133	Jack McMahon (22)	13–25
39	January 21	vs. Rochester	L 90–97	Bob Pettit (28)	13–26
40	January 22	@ Syracuse	W 109–105	Bob Pettit (39)	14–26
41	January 25	Rochester	W 114–106	Bob Pettit (33)	15–26
42	January 28	Syracuse	W 93–85	Al Ferrari (21)	16–26
43	January 29	@ Minneapolis	W 114–107	Bob Pettit (39)	17–26
44	January 31	Boston	W 114–91	Al Ferrari (20)	18–26
45	February 2	Fort Wayne	W 98–90	Bob Pettit (27)	19–26
46	February 4	vs. Fort Wayne	W 98–94	Bob Pettit (40)	20–26
47	February 5	Philadelphia	W 105–93	Bob Pettit (30)	21–26
48	February 8	vs. Boston	W 111–110	Bob Pettit (36)	22–26
49	February 9	@ Philadelphia	L 97–108	Bob Pettit (27)	22–27
50	February 10	@ Boston	L 100–124	Jack Coleman (23)	22–28
51	February 11	@ New York	L 91–107	Bob Pettit (24)	22–29
52	February 12	Philadelphia	L 79–87	Bob Pettit (37)	22–30
53	February 14	New York	L 99–103	Bob Pettit (30)	22–31
54	February 19	Fort Wayne	L 83–89	Bob Pettit (20)	22–32
55	February 20	vs. Fort Wayne	W 84–82	Bob Pettit (26)	23–32
56	February 21	Boston	W 101–97	Pettit, Share (27)	24–32
57	February 22	vs. Rochester	L 109–110	Park, Pettit (22)	24–33
58	February 24	vs. Syracuse	W 116–103	Bob Pettit (46)	25–33
59	February 25	@ New York	W 99–89	Bob Pettit (37)	26–33
60	February 26	New York	W 103–85	Bob Pettit (32)	27–33
61	February 27	vs. New York	L 109–113	Bob Pettit (23)	27–34
62	March 1	Rochester	L 94–95	Bob Pettit (27)	27–35
63	March 3	Fort Wayne	W 92–86	Ferrari, Share (19)	28–35
64	March 4	@ Minneapolis	L 84–113	Jack Stephens (14)	28–36
65	March 6	vs. Philadelphia	W 102–97	Bob Pettit (32)	29–36
66	March 7	@ Rochester	W 96–89	Bob Pettit (28)	30–36
67	March 8	@ Syracuse	L 88–92	Jack Stephens (21)	30–37
68	March 9	Minneapolis	W 103–102	Bob Pettit (44)	31–37
69	March 10	Minneapolis	W 105–97	Bob Pettit (34)	32–37
70	March 11	@ Boston	W 127–121	Bob Pettit (43)	33–37
71	March 12	vs. Syracuse	L 92–97	Chuck Share (30)	33–38
72	March 13	@ Philadelphia	L 113–116	Bob Pettit (29)	33–39

== Playoffs ==
1956 playoff game log
Division Tiebreaker (finished as West's #3 seed)

Game	Date	Team	Score	High points	Location	Record
1	March 16	Minneapolis	L 97–103	Bob Pettit (22)	Kiel Auditorium	0–1

Division Semifinals: 2–1 (home: 1–0; road: 1–1)

Game	Date	Team	Score	High points	Location	Series
1	March 17	Minneapolis	W 116–115	Bob Pettit (25)	Kiel Auditorium	1–0
2	March 19	@ Minneapolis	L 75–133	Bob Pettit (14)	Minneapolis Auditorium	1–1
3	March 21	@ Minneapolis	W 116–115	Bob Pettit (41)	Minneapolis Auditorium	2–1

Division Finals: 2–3 (home: 1–1; road: 1–2)

Game	Date	Team	Score	High points	Location	Series
1	March 22	@ Fort Wayne	W 86–85	Al Ferrari (17)	War Memorial Coliseum	1–0
2	March 24	Fort Wayne	W 84–74	Al Ferrari (21)	Kiel Auditorium	2–0
3	March 25	@ Fort Wayne	L 84–107	Alex Hannum (18)	War Memorial Coliseum	2–1
4	March 27	Fort Wayne	L 84–93	Jack Coleman (19)	Kiel Auditorium	2–2
5	March 29	@ Fort Wayne	L 97–102	Jack Coleman (20)	War Memorial Coliseum	2–3

1956 schedule

== Awards and honors ==
- Bob Pettit, NBA Most Valuable Player Award
- Bob Pettit, All-NBA First Team
