= Ed Conlin =

American basketball player and coach

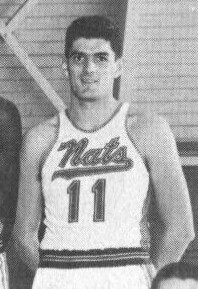
- Conlin with the Syracuse Nationals in 1958

Personal information
- Born: September 2, 1933 Brooklyn, New York, U.S.
- Died: September 21, 2012 (aged 79) Montclair, New Jersey, U.S.
- Listed height: 6 ft 5 in (1.96 m)
- Listed weight: 200 lb (91 kg)

Career information
- High school: St. Michael's (Brooklyn, New York)
- College: Fordham (1951–1955)
- NBA draft: 1955: 1st round, 5th overall pick
- Drafted by: Syracuse Nationals
- Playing career: 1955–1962
- Position: Small forward / shooting guard
- Number: 8, 11, 12, 7
- Coaching career: 1967–1970

Career history

Playing
- 1955–1959: Syracuse Nationals
- 1959–1960: Detroit Pistons
- 1960–1962: Philadelphia Warriors

Coaching
- 1967–1968: Fordham (assistant)
- 1968–1970: Fordham

Career highlights
- First-team All-American – Look (1955); Second-team All-American – NEA (1955); Third-team All-American – Look (1954); Third-team All-American – Collier's (1955); NCAA rebounding leader (1953); 2× Haggerty Award winner (1954, 1955); No. 11 retired by Fordham Rams

Career NBA playing statistics
- Points: 4,891 (10.1 ppg)
- Rebounds: 2,349 (4.8 rpg)
- Assists: 949 (2.0 apg)
- Stats at NBA.com
- Stats at Basketball Reference

Career coaching record
- College: 27–24 (.529)

Edward James Conlin (September 2, 1933 – September 21, 2012) was an American basketball player and coach.

A 6'5" swingman from Fordham University, Conlin played in the National Basketball Association (NBA) from 1955 to 1962 as a member of the Syracuse Nationals, Detroit Pistons, and Philadelphia Warriors. On February 13, 1959, Conlin was traded from Syracuse to Detroit for eventual hall-of-famer George Yardley. He averaged 10.1 points per game in his NBA career.

Conlin returned to Fordham when he joined the coaching staff of Johnny Bach in 1967. He assumed the position of head coach from 1968 to 1970. Conlin was dismissed from the team in 1970 with a record of 27–24 during his two seasons.

Conlin was inducted into the Fordham Athletic Hall of Fame in 1973 and his number 11 was retired by the team in 2004.

Conlin died on September 21, 2012.

== Career statistics ==
Legend
GP	Games played	GS	Games started	MPG	Minutes per game
FG%	Field goal percentage	3P%	3-point field goal percentage	FT%	Free throw percentage
RPG	Rebounds per game	APG	Assists per game	SPG	Steals per game
BPG	Blocks per game	PPG	Points per game	**Bold**	Career high
*	Led the league

=== NBA ===
==== Regular season ====
Year	Team	GP	MPG	FG%	FT%	RPG	APG	PPG
1955–56	Syracuse	66	21.6	.368	.680	4.9	2.2	8.2
1956–57	Syracuse	71	**31.7**	.374	.769	6.1	**2.9**	13.4
1957–58	Syracuse	60	31.2	**.391**	**.796**	**7.3**	2.2	**15.0**
1958–59	Syracuse	57*	28.1	.365	.739	5.3	2.0	11.9
1958–59	Detroit	15*	23.6	.389	.651	6.1	1.1	11.8
1959–60	Detroit	70	23.4	.361	.761	4.9	1.8	11.2
1960–61	Philadelphia	**77**	16.8	.361	.748	3.4	1.6	7.0
1961–62	Philadelphia	70	13.8	.345	.742	2.2	1.2	4.6
Career		486	23.4	.370	.750	4.8	2.0	10.1

==== Playoffs ====
Year	Team	GP	MPG	FG%	FT%	RPG	APG	PPG
1956	Syracuse	8	24.6	.365	.579	5.9	1.1	10.5
1957	Syracuse	5	32.8	**.394**	.778	3.4	**3.0**	**15.4**
1958	Syracuse	3	**37.7**	.311	.714	**7.0**	1.3	11.0
1959	Detroit	3	14.3	.250	.500	2.3	1.3	3.3
1960	Detroit	2	10.0	.300	**1.000**	2.0	.0	4.0
1961	Philadelphia	3	14.0	.294	**1.000**	1.3	1.3	5.0
1962	Philadelphia	**11**	7.8	.200	.615	1.8	.3	2.4
Career		35	19.0	.325	.677	3.4	1.1	7.2

== Head coaching record ==
Record table
Season	Team	Overall	Conference	Standing	Postseason
Fordham Rams (Independent) (1968–1970)
1968–69	Fordham	17–9			
1969–70	Fordham	10–15			
Fordham:		27–24 (.529)			
Total:		27–24 (.529)			

== See also ==
- List of NCAA Division I men's basketball season rebounding leaders
- List of NCAA Division I men's basketball career rebounding leaders
