= List of NBA career free throw scoring leaders =

This article provides two lists:

A list of National Basketball Association players by total career regular season free throws made.

A progressive list of free throws made leaders showing how the record has increased through the years.

== Free throws made leaders ==
This is a list of National Basketball Association players by total career regular season free throws made.

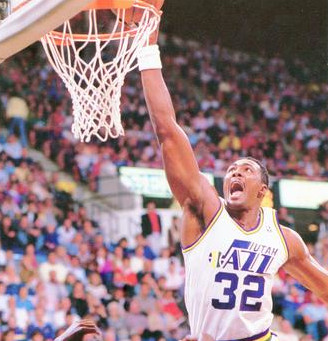
Karl Malone has made the most free throws in NBA history.

^	Active NBA player
*	Inducted into the Naismith Memorial Basketball Hall of Fame
†	Not yet eligible for Hall of Fame consideration (Note: A player is not eligible for induction into the Naismith Memorial Basketball Hall of Fame until he has been fully retired for two calendar years.)

Statistics accurate as of November 18, 2026.

Rank	Player	Position(s)	Team(s) played for (years) (Note: American Basketball Association (ABA) teams other than those admitted into the NBA in 1976 are not included; each year is linked to an article about that particular NBA season.)	Total free throws made	Total free throws attempted	Free throws percentage	Free throws made per game
1	Karl Malone*	PF	Utah Jazz (1985–2003); Los Angeles Lakers (2003–2004)	9,787	13,188	.742	6.63
2	LeBron James^	SF	Cleveland Cavaliers (2003–2010, 2014–2018); Miami Heat (2010–2014); Los Angeles Lakers (2018–2026); Philadelphia 76ers (2026–present)	8,920	12,103	.737	5.46
3	James Harden^	SG/PG	Oklahoma City Thunder (2009–2012); Houston Rockets (2012–2021); Brooklyn Nets (2021–2022); Philadelphia 76ers (2022–2023); Los Angeles Clippers (2023–2026); Cleveland Cavaliers (2026–present)	8,693	10,079	.862	7.03
4	Moses Malone*	C	Buffalo Braves (1976); Houston Rockets (1976–1982); Philadelphia 76ers (1982–1986, 1993–1994); Washington Bullets (1986–1988); Atlanta Hawks (1988–1991); Milwaukee Bucks (1991–1993); San Antonio Spurs (1994–1995)	8,531	11,090	.769	6.42
5	Kobe Bryant*	SG	Los Angeles Lakers (1996–2016)	8,378	10,011	.837	6.22
6	Kevin Durant^	SF/PF	Seattle SuperSonics/Oklahoma City Thunder (2007–2016); Golden State Warriors (2016–2019); Brooklyn Nets (2019–2023); Phoenix Suns (2023–2025); Houston Rockets (2025–present)	7,807	8,856	.882	6.41
7	Oscar Robertson*	PG	Cincinnati Royals (1960–1970); Milwaukee Bucks (1970–1974)	7,694	9,185	.838	7.40
8	Michael Jordan*	SG	Chicago Bulls (1984–1993, 1995–1998); Washington Wizards (2001–2003)	7,327	8,772	.835	6.83
9	Dirk Nowitzki*	PF	Dallas Mavericks (1998–2019)	7,240	8,239	.879	4.76
10	Jerry West*	PG/SG	Los Angeles Lakers (1960–1974)	7,160	8,801	.814	7.68
11	DeMar DeRozan^	SG/SF	Toronto Raptors (2009–2018); San Antonio Spurs (2018–2021); Chicago Bulls (2021–2024); Sacramento Kings (2024–2026); Denver Nuggets (2026–present)	6,957	8,252	.843	5.45
12	Paul Pierce*	SF	Boston Celtics (1998–2013); Brooklyn Nets (2013–2014); Washington Wizards (2014–2015); Los Angeles Clippers (2015–2017)	6,918	8,578	.806	5.15
13	Adrian Dantley*	SF	Buffalo Braves (1976–1977); Indiana Pacers (1977); Los Angeles Lakers (1977–1979); Utah Jazz (1979–1986); Detroit Pistons (1986–1989); Dallas Mavericks (1989–1990); Milwaukee Bucks (1991)	6,832	8,351	.818	7.15
14	Kareem Abdul-Jabbar*	C	Milwaukee Bucks (1969–1975); Los Angeles Lakers (1975–1989)	6,712	9,304	.721	4.30
14	Dolph Schayes*	PF	Syracuse Nationals/Philadelphia 76ers (1949–1964)	6,712	7,904	.849	6.74
16	Allen Iverson*	SG/PG	Philadelphia 76ers (1996–2006, 2009–2010); Denver Nuggets (2006–2008); Detroit Pistons (2008–2009); Memphis Grizzlies (2009)	6,375	8,168	.780	6.97
17	Charles Barkley*	PF	Philadelphia 76ers (1984–1992); Phoenix Suns (1992–1996); Houston Rockets (1996–2000)	6,349	8,643	.735	5.92
18	Carmelo Anthony*	SF	Denver Nuggets (2003–2011); New York Knicks (2011–2017); Oklahoma City Thunder (2017–2018); Houston Rockets (2018–2019); Portland Trail Blazers (2019–2021); Los Angeles Lakers (2021–2022)	6,320	7,764	.814	5.02
19	Reggie Miller*	SG	Indiana Pacers (1987–2005)	6,237	7,026	.888	4.49
20	Bob Pettit*	PF	Milwaukee/St. Louis Hawks (1954–1965)	6,182	8,119	.761	7.81
21	Russell Westbrook^{†}	PG	Oklahoma City Thunder (2008–2019); Houston Rockets (2019–2020); Washington Wizards (2020–2021); Los Angeles Lakers (2021–2023); Los Angeles Clippers (2023–2024); Denver Nuggets (2024–2025); Sacramento Kings (2025–2026)	6,109	7,928	.771	4.70
22	Wilt Chamberlain*	C	Philadelphia/San Francisco Warriors (1959–1965); Philadelphia 76ers (1965–1968); Los Angeles Lakers (1968–1973)	6,057	11,862	.511	5.80
23	David Robinson*	C	San Antonio Spurs (1989–2003)	6,035	8,201	.736	6.11
24	Dominique Wilkins*	SF	Atlanta Hawks (1982–1994); Los Angeles Clippers (1994); Boston Celtics (1994–1995); San Antonio Spurs (1996–1997); Orlando Magic (1999)	6,031	7,438	.811	5.62
25	Shaquille O'Neal*	C	Orlando Magic (1992–1996); Los Angeles Lakers (1996–2004); Miami Heat (2004–2008); Phoenix Suns (2008–2009); Cleveland Cavaliers (2009–2010); Boston Celtics (2010–2011)	5,935	11,252	.527	4.92
26	Tim Duncan*	PF/C	San Antonio Spurs (1997–2016)	5,896	8,468	.696	4.24
27	Elgin Baylor*	SF	Minneapolis/Los Angeles Lakers (1958–1971)	5,763	7,391	.780	6.81
28	Dwyane Wade*	SG	Miami Heat (2003–2016, 2018–2019); Chicago Bulls (2016–2017); Cleveland Cavaliers (2017–2018)	5,708	7,463	.765	5.42
29	Hakeem Olajuwon*	C	Houston Rockets (1984–2001); Toronto Raptors (2001–2002)	5,423	7,621	.712	4.38
30	Lenny Wilkens*	PG	St. Louis Hawks (1960–1968); Seattle SuperSonics (1968–1972); Cleveland Cavaliers (1972–1974); Portland Trail Blazers (1974–1975)	5,394	6,973	.774	5.01
31	Patrick Ewing*	C	New York Knicks (1985–2000); Seattle SuperSonics (2000–2001); Orlando Magic (2001–2002)	5,392	7,289	.740	4.56
32	John Havlicek*	SF	Boston Celtics (1962–1978)	5,369	6,589	.815	4.23
33	Dwight Howard*	C	Orlando Magic (2004–2012); Los Angeles Lakers (2012–2013, 2019–2020, 2021–2022); Houston Rockets (2013–2016); Atlanta Hawks (2016–2017); Charlotte Hornets (2017–2018); Washington Wizards (2018–2019); Philadelphia 76ers (2020–2021)	5,361	9,455	.567	4.32
34	Elvin Hayes*	PF	San Diego/Houston Rockets (1968–1972); Baltimore/Capital/Washington Bullets (1972–1981); Houston Rockets (1981–1984)	5,356	7,999	.670	4.11
35	Damian Lillard^	PG	Portland Trail Blazers (2012–2023, 2026–present); Milwaukee Bucks (2023–2025)	5,339	5,940	.899	5.84
36	Giannis Antetokounmpo^	PF	Milwaukee Bucks (2013–2026); Miami Heat (2026–present)	5,269	7,632	.690	5.79
37	Jimmy Butler^	SF/SG	Chicago Bulls (2011–2017); Minnesota Timberwolves (2017–2018); Philadelphia 76ers (2018–2019); Miami Heat (2019–2025); Golden State Warriors (2025–present)	5,168	6,120	.844	5.70
38	Walt Bellamy*	C	Chicago Packers/Zephyrs//Baltimore Bullets (1961–1965); New York Knicks (1965–1968); Detroit Pistons (1968–1970); Atlanta Hawks (1970–1974); New Orleans Jazz (1974)	5,113	8,088	.632	4.90
39	Chet Walker*	SF	Syracuse Nationals/Philadelphia 76ers (1962–1969); Chicago Bulls (1969–1975)	5,079	6,384	.796	4.92
40	Tom Chambers	PF	San Diego Clippers (1981–1983); Seattle SuperSonics (1983–1988); Phoenix Suns (1988–1993); Utah Jazz (1993–1995); Charlotte Hornets (1997); Philadelphia 76ers (1997)	5,066	6,274	.807	4.58
41	Paul Arizin*	SF	Philadelphia Warriors (1950–1962)	5,010	6,189	.810	7.03
42	Magic Johnson*	PG	Los Angeles Lakers (1979–1991, 1996)	4,960	5,850	.848	5.47
43	Kevin Garnett*	PF	Minnesota Timberwolves (1995–2007, 2015–2016); Boston Celtics (2007–2013); Brooklyn Nets (2013–2015)	4,887	6,190	.789	3.34
44	Chris Paul^{†}	PG	New Orleans Hornets (2005–2011); Los Angeles Clippers (2011–2017, 2025–2026); Houston Rockets (2017–2019); Oklahoma City Thunder (2019–2020); Phoenix Suns (2020–2023); Golden State Warriors (2023–2024); San Antonio Spurs (2024–2025)	4,858	5,581	.870	3.55
45	Vince Carter*	SG/SF	Toronto Raptors (1998–2004); New Jersey Nets (2004–2009); Orlando Magic (2009–2010); Phoenix Suns (2010–2011); Dallas Mavericks (2011–2014); Memphis Grizzlies (2014–2017); Sacramento Kings (2017–2018); Atlanta Hawks (2018–2020)	4,852	6,082	.798	3.15
46	John Stockton*	PG	Utah Jazz (1984–2003)	4,788	5,796	.826	3.18
47	Pau Gasol*	PF/C	Memphis Grizzlies (2001–2008); Los Angeles Lakers (2008–2014); Chicago Bulls (2014–2016); San Antonio Spurs (2016–2019); Milwaukee Bucks (2019)	4,755	6,311	.753	3.88
48	Bailey Howell*	SF	Detroit Pistons (1959–1964); Baltimore Bullets (1964–1966); Boston Celtics (1966–1970); Philadelphia 76ers (1970–1971)	4,740	6,224	.762	4.99
49	World B. Free	PG	Philadelphia 76ers (1975–1978, 1987); San Diego Clippers (1978–1980); Golden State Warriors (1980–1982); Cleveland Cavaliers (1982–1986); Houston Rockets (1987–1988)	4,718	6,264	.753	5.33
50	Clyde Drexler*	SG	Portland Trail Blazers (1983–1995); Houston Rockets (1995–1998)	4,698	5,962	.788	4.33

== Progressive list of free throw scoring leaders ==
This is a progressive list of free throw scoring leaders showing how the record has increased through the years.

Statistics accurate as of November 18, 2026.

^	Active NBA player
*	Inducted into the Naismith Memorial Basketball Hall of Fame

Team AbbreviationsTeam listed is the one player was on when he established the record.
BOS	Boston Celtics	HOU	Houston Rockets	NOJ	New Orleans Jazz	SAC	Sacramento Kings
BUF	Buffalo Braves	IND	Indiana Pacers	NOP	New Orleans Pelicans	SDC	San Diego Clippers
CHI	Chicago Bulls	KCO	Kansas City–Omaha Kings	OKC	Oklahoma City Thunder	SFW	San Francisco Warriors
CIN	Cincinnati Royals	LAC	Los Angeles Clippers	PHI	Philadelphia 76ers	STL	St. Louis Hawks
CLE	Cleveland Cavaliers	LAL	Los Angeles Lakers	PHO	Phoenix Suns	SYR	Syracuse Nationals
DAL	Dallas Mavericks	MIA	Miami Heat	PHW	Philadelphia Warriors	TOR	Toronto Raptors
DEN	Denver Nuggets	MIL	Milwaukee Bucks	POR	Portland Trail Blazers	UTA	Utah Jazz
DET	Detroit Pistons	MNL	Minneapolis Lakers	SAS	San Antonio Spurs	WSB	Washington Bullets

Free Throw Leader at the end of every season
Season	Year-by-Year	FT	Active Player	FT	Career Record	FT	Single Season Record	FT	Season
1946–47	Joe Fulks*PHW	439	Joe Fulks*PHW	439	Joe Fulks*PHW	439	Joe Fulks*PHW	439	1946–47
1947–48	Joe Fulks*PHW	297	Joe Fulks*PHW	736	Joe Fulks*PHW	736	Joe Fulks*PHW	439	1947–48
1948–49	George Mikan*MNL	532	Joe Fulks*PHW	1,238	Joe Fulks*PHW	1,238	George Mikan*MNL	532	1948–49
1949–50	George Mikan*MNL	567	Joe Fulks*PHW	1,531	Joe Fulks*PHW	1,531	George Mikan*MNL	567	1949–50
1950–51	George Mikan*MNL	576	Joe Fulks*PHW	1,909	Joe Fulks*PHW	1,909	George Mikan*MNL	576	1950–51
1951–52	Paul Arizin*PHW	578	Joe Fulks*PHW	2,159	Joe Fulks*PHW	2,159	Paul Arizin*PHW	578	1951–52
1952–53	Neil Johnston*PHW	556	George Mikan*MNL	2,550	George Mikan*MNL	2,550	Paul Arizin*PHW	578	1952–53
1953–54	Neil Johnston*PHW	577	George Mikan*MNL	2,974	George Mikan*MNL	2,974	Paul Arizin*PHW	578	1953–54
1954–55	Neil Johnston*PHW	589	Ed Macauley*BOS	2,703	George Mikan*MNL	2,974	Neil Johnston*PHW	589	1954–55
1955–56	Bob Pettit*STL	557	Dolph Schayes*SYR	3,206	Dolph Schayes*SYR	3,206	Neil Johnston*PHW	589	1955–56
1956–57	Dolph Schayes*SYR	625	Dolph Schayes*SYR	3,831	Dolph Schayes*SYR	3,831	Dolph Schayes*SYR	625	1956–57
1957–58	George Yardley*DET	655	Dolph Schayes*SYR	4,460	Dolph Schayes*SYR	4,460	George Yardley*DET	655	1957–58
1958–59	Bob Pettit*STL	667	Dolph Schayes*SYR	4,986	Dolph Schayes*SYR	4,986	Bob Pettit*STL	667	1958–59
1959–60	Jack Twyman*CIN	598	Dolph Schayes*SYR	5,519	Dolph Schayes*SYR	5,519	Bob Pettit*STL	667	1959–60
1960–61	Dolph Schayes*SYR	680	Dolph Schayes*SYR	6,199	Dolph Schayes*SYR	6,199	Dolph Schayes*SYR	680	1960–61
1961–62	Wilt Chamberlain*PHW	835	Dolph Schayes*SYR	6,485	Dolph Schayes*SYR	6,485	Wilt Chamberlain*PHW	835	1961–62
1962–63	Bob Pettit*STL	685	Dolph Schayes*SYR	6,666	Dolph Schayes*SYR	6,666	Wilt Chamberlain*PHW	835	1962–63
1963–64	Oscar Robertson*CIN	800	Dolph Schayes*SYR	6,712	Dolph Schayes*SYR	6,712	Wilt Chamberlain*PHW	835	1963–64
1964–65	Oscar Robertson*CIN	665	Bob Pettit*STL	6,182	Dolph Schayes*SYR	6,712	Wilt Chamberlain*PHW	835	1964–65
1965–66	Jerry West*LAL	840	Oscar Robertson*; CIN 1965–70; MIL 1970–74	4,174	Dolph Schayes*SYR	6,712	Jerry West*LAL	840	1965–66
1966–67	Rick Barry*SFW	753	Oscar Robertson*; CIN 1965–70; MIL 1970–74	4,910	Dolph Schayes*SYR	6,712	Jerry West*LAL	840	1966–67
1967–68	Oscar Robertson*CIN	576	Oscar Robertson*; CIN 1965–70; MIL 1970–74	5,486	Dolph Schayes*SYR	6,712	Jerry West*LAL	840	1967–68
1968–69	Oscar Robertson*CIN	643	Oscar Robertson*; CIN 1965–70; MIL 1970–74	6,129	Dolph Schayes*SYR	6,712	Jerry West*LAL	840	1968–69
1969–70	Jerry West*LAL	647	Oscar Robertson*; CIN 1965–70; MIL 1970–74	6,583	Dolph Schayes*SYR	6,712	Jerry West*LAL	840	1969–70
1970–71	Dave Bing*DET	615	Oscar Robertson*; CIN 1965–70; MIL 1970–74	6,968	Oscar Robertson*MIL	6,968	Jerry West*LAL	840	1970–71
1971–72	Nate Archibald*CIN; KCO 1972–73	677	Oscar Robertson*; CIN 1965–70; MIL 1970–74	7,244	Oscar Robertson*MIL	7,244	Jerry West*LAL	840	1971–72
1972–73	Nate Archibald*CIN; KCO 1972–73	663	Oscar Robertson*; CIN 1965–70; MIL 1970–74	7,482	Oscar Robertson*MIL	7,482	Jerry West*LAL	840	1972–73
1973–74	Gail Goodrich*LAL	508	Oscar Robertson*; CIN 1965–70; MIL 1970–74	7,694	Oscar Robertson*MIL	7,694	Jerry West*LAL	840	1973–74
1974–75	Nate Archibald*KCO	652	Lenny Wilkens*POR	5,394	Oscar Robertson*MIL	7,694	Jerry West*LAL	840	1974–75
1975–76	Bob McAdoo*BUF	559	John Havlicek*BOS	4,904	Oscar Robertson*MIL	7,694	Jerry West*LAL	840	1975–76
1976–77	Pete Maravich*NOJ	501	John Havlicek*BOS	5,139	Oscar Robertson*MIL	7,694	Jerry West*LAL	840	1976–77
1977–78	Adrian Dantley*LAL	541	John Havlicek*BOS	5,369	Oscar Robertson*MIL	7,694	Jerry West*LAL	840	1977–78
1978–79	World B. FreeSDC	654	Gail Goodrich*NOJ	4,319	Oscar Robertson*MIL	7,694	Jerry West*LAL	840	1978–79
1979–80	World B. FreeSDC	572	Elvin Hayes*; WSB 1979–81; HOU 1981–83	4,523	Oscar Robertson*MIL	7,694	Jerry West*LAL	840	1979–80
1980–81	Adrian Dantley*UTA	632	Elvin Hayes*; WSB 1979–81; HOU 1981–83	4,794	Oscar Robertson*MIL	7,694	Jerry West*LAL	840	1980–81
1981–82	Adrian Dantley*UTA	648	Elvin Hayes*; WSB 1979–81; HOU 1981–83	5,074	Oscar Robertson*MIL	7,694	Jerry West*LAL	840	1981–82
1982–83	Moses Malone*PHI	600	Elvin Hayes*; WSB 1979–81; HOU 1981–83	5,270	Oscar Robertson*MIL	7,694	Jerry West*LAL	840	1982–83
1983–84	Adrian Dantley*UTA	813	Kareem Abdul-Jabbar*LAL	5,515	Oscar Robertson*MIL	7,694	Jerry West*LAL	840	1983–84
1984–85	Moses Malone*PHI	737	Kareem Abdul-Jabbar*LAL	5,804	Oscar Robertson*MIL	7,694	Jerry West*LAL	840	1984–85
1985–86	Adrian Dantley*UTA	630	Kareem Abdul-Jabbar*LAL	6,140	Oscar Robertson*MIL	7,694	Jerry West*LAL	840	1985–86
1986–87	Michael Jordan*CHI	833	Kareem Abdul-Jabbar*LAL	6,385	Oscar Robertson*MIL	7,694	Jerry West*LAL	840	1986–87
1987–88	Michael Jordan*CHI	723	Moses Malone*; WSB 1987–88; ATL 1988–91; MIL 1991–93; PHI 1993–94; SAS 1994–95	6,636	Oscar Robertson*MIL	7,694	Jerry West*LAL	840	1987–88
1988–89	Karl Malone*UTA	703	Moses Malone*; WSB 1987–88; ATL 1988–91; MIL 1991–93; PHI 1993–94; SAS 1994–95	7,197	Oscar Robertson*MIL	7,694	Jerry West*LAL	840	1988–89
1989–90	Karl Malone*UTA	696	Moses Malone*; WSB 1987–88; ATL 1988–91; MIL 1991–93; PHI 1993–94; SAS 1994–95	7,690	Oscar Robertson*MIL	7,694	Jerry West*LAL	840	1989–90
1990–91	Karl Malone*UTA	684	Moses Malone*; WSB 1987–88; ATL 1988–91; MIL 1991–93; PHI 1993–94; SAS 1994–95	7,999	Moses Malone*; ATL 1990–91; MIL 1991–93; PHI 1993–94; SAS 1994–95	7,999	Jerry West*LAL	840	1990–91
1991–92	Karl Malone*UTA	673	Moses Malone*; WSB 1987–88; ATL 1988–91; MIL 1991–93; PHI 1993–94; SAS 1994–95	8,395	Moses Malone*; ATL 1990–91; MIL 1991–93; PHI 1993–94; SAS 1994–95	8,395	Jerry West*LAL	840	1991–92
1992–93	Karl Malone*UTA	619	Moses Malone*; WSB 1987–88; ATL 1988–91; MIL 1991–93; PHI 1993–94; SAS 1994–95	8,419	Moses Malone*; ATL 1990–91; MIL 1991–93; PHI 1993–94; SAS 1994–95	8,419	Jerry West*LAL	840	1992–93
1993–94	David Robinson*SAS	693	Moses Malone*; WSB 1987–88; ATL 1988–91; MIL 1991–93; PHI 1993–94; SAS 1994–95	8,509	Moses Malone*; ATL 1990–91; MIL 1991–93; PHI 1993–94; SAS 1994–95	8,509	Jerry West*LAL	840	1993–94
1994–95	David Robinson*SAS	656	Moses Malone*; WSB 1987–88; ATL 1988–91; MIL 1991–93; PHI 1993–94; SAS 1994–95	8,531	Moses Malone*; ATL 1990–91; MIL 1991–93; PHI 1993–94; SAS 1994–95	8,531	Jerry West*LAL	840	1994–95
1995–96	David Robinson*SAS	626	Karl Malone*; UTA 1995–2003; LAL 2003–04	5,984	Moses Malone*; ATL 1990–91; MIL 1991–93; PHI 1993–94; SAS 1994–95	8,531	Jerry West*LAL	840	1995–96
1996–97	Karl Malone*UTA	521	Karl Malone*; UTA 1995–2003; LAL 2003–04	6,505	Moses Malone*; ATL 1990–91; MIL 1991–93; PHI 1993–94; SAS 1994–95	8,531	Jerry West*LAL	840	1996–97
1997–98	Karl Malone*UTA	628	Karl Malone*; UTA 1995–2003; LAL 2003–04	7,133	Moses Malone*; ATL 1990–91; MIL 1991–93; PHI 1993–94; SAS 1994–95	8,531	Jerry West*LAL	840	1997–98
1998–99	Karl Malone*UTA	378	Karl Malone*; UTA 1995–2003; LAL 2003–04	7,511	Moses Malone*; ATL 1990–91; MIL 1991–93; PHI 1993–94; SAS 1994–95	8,531	Jerry West*LAL	840	1998–99
1999–00	Jerry StackhouseDET	618	Karl Malone*; UTA 1995–2003; LAL 2003–04	8,100	Moses Malone*; ATL 1990–91; MIL 1991–93; PHI 1993–94; SAS 1994–95	8,531	Jerry West*LAL	840	1999–00
2000–01	Jerry StackhouseDET	666	Karl Malone*; UTA 1995–2003; LAL 2003–04	8,636	Karl Malone*; UTA 2000–03; LAL 2003–04	8,636	Jerry West*LAL	840	2000–01
2001–02	Tim Duncan*SAS	560	Karl Malone*; UTA 1995–2003; LAL 2003–04	9,145	Karl Malone*; UTA 2000–03; LAL 2003–04	9,145	Jerry West*LAL	840	2001–02
2002–03	Paul Pierce*BOS	604	Karl Malone*; UTA 1995–2003; LAL 2003–04	9,619	Karl Malone*; UTA 2000–03; LAL 2003–04	9,619	Jerry West*LAL	840	2002–03
2003–04	Corey MaggetteLAC	526	Karl Malone*; UTA 1995–2003; LAL 2003–04	9,787	Karl Malone*; UTA 2000–03; LAL 2003–04	9,787	Jerry West*LAL	840	2003–04
2004–05	Allen Iverson*PHI	656	Reggie Miller*IND	6,237	Karl Malone*; UTA 2000–03; LAL 2003–04	9,787	Jerry West*LAL	840	2004–05
2005–06	Kobe Bryant*LAL	696	Shaquille O'Neal*MIA	5,147	Karl Malone*; UTA 2000–03; LAL 2003–04	9,787	Jerry West*LAL	840	2005–06
2006–07	Kobe Bryant*LAL	667	Allen Iverson*; PHI 2006; DEN 2006–08; DET 2008–09	5,355	Karl Malone*; UTA 2000–03; LAL 2003–04	9,787	Jerry West*LAL	840	2006–07
2007–08	Allen Iverson*DEN	645	Allen Iverson*; PHI 2006; DEN 2006–08; DET 2008–09	6,000	Karl Malone*; UTA 2000–03; LAL 2003–04	9,787	Jerry West*LAL	840	2007–08
2008–09	LeBron James^CLE	594	Allen Iverson*; PHI 2006; DEN 2006–08; DET 2008–09	6,271	Karl Malone*; UTA 2000–03; LAL 2003–04	9,787	Jerry West*LAL	840	2008–09
2009–10	Kevin Durant^OKC	756	Kobe Bryant*LAL	6,543	Karl Malone*; UTA 2000–03; LAL 2003–04	9,787	Jerry West*LAL	840	2009–10
2010–11	Kevin Durant^OKC Kevin MartinHOU	594	Kobe Bryant*LAL	7,026	Karl Malone*; UTA 2000–03; LAL 2003–04	9,787	Jerry West*LAL	840	2010–11
2011–12	Kevin Durant^OKC	431	Kobe Bryant*LAL	7,407	Karl Malone*; UTA 2000–03; LAL 2003–04	9,787	Jerry West*LAL	840	2011–12
2012–13	Kevin Durant^OKC	679	Kobe Bryant*LAL	7,932	Karl Malone*; UTA 2000–03; LAL 2003–04	9,787	Jerry West*LAL	840	2012–13
2013–14	Kevin Durant^OKC	703	Kobe Bryant*LAL	7,950	Karl Malone*; UTA 2000–03; LAL 2003–04	9,787	Jerry West*LAL	840	2013–14
2014–15	James Harden^HOU	715	Kobe Bryant*LAL	8,146	Karl Malone*; UTA 2000–03; LAL 2003–04	9,787	Jerry West*LAL	840	2014–15
2015–16	James Harden^HOU	720	Kobe Bryant*LAL	8,378	Karl Malone*; UTA 2000–03; LAL 2003–04	9,787	Jerry West*LAL	840	2015–16
2016–17	James Harden^HOU	746	Dirk Nowitzki*DAL	7,104	Karl Malone*; UTA 2000–03; LAL 2003–04	9,787	Jerry West*LAL	840	2016–17
2017–18	James Harden^HOU	624	Dirk Nowitzki*DAL	7,201	Karl Malone*; UTA 2000–03; LAL 2003–04	9,787	Jerry West*LAL	840	2017–18
2018–19	James Harden^HOU	754	Dirk Nowitzki*DAL	7,240	Karl Malone*; UTA 2000–03; LAL 2003–04	9,787	Jerry West*LAL	840	2018–19
2019–20	James Harden^HOU	692	LeBron James; LAL 2019–26; PHI 2026–	7,404	Karl Malone*; UTA 2000–03; LAL 2003–04	9,787	Jerry West*LAL	840	2019–20
2020–21	Trae Young^ATL	484	LeBron James; LAL 2019–26; PHI 2026–	7,582	Karl Malone*; UTA 2000–03; LAL 2003–04	9,787	Jerry West*LAL	840	2020–21
2021–22	Joel Embiid^PHI	654	LeBron James; LAL 2019–26; PHI 2026–	7,836	Karl Malone*; UTA 2000–03; LAL 2003–04	9,787	Jerry West*LAL	840	2021–22
2022–23	Shai Gilgeous-Alexander^OKC	669	LeBron James; LAL 2019–26; PHI 2026–	8,087	Karl Malone*; UTA 2000–03; LAL 2003–04	9,787	Jerry West*LAL	840	2022–23
2023–24	Shai Gilgeous-Alexander^OKC	567	LeBron James; LAL 2019–26; PHI 2026–	8,390	Karl Malone*; UTA 2000–03; LAL 2003–04	9,787	Jerry West*LAL	840	2023–24
2024–25	Shai Gilgeous-Alexander^OKC	601	LeBron James; LAL 2019–26; PHI 2026–	8,649	Karl Malone*; UTA 2000–03; LAL 2003–04	9,787	Jerry West*LAL	840	2024–25
2025–26	Shai Gilgeous-Alexander^OKC	540	LeBron James; LAL 2019–26; PHI 2026–	8,882	Karl Malone*; UTA 2000–03; LAL 2003–04	9,787	Jerry West*LAL	840	2025–26
2026–27	Luka Dončić^LAL	127	LeBron James; LAL 2019–26; PHI 2026–	8,920	Karl Malone*; UTA 2000–03; LAL 2003–04	9,787	Jerry West*LAL	840	2026–27
Season	Year-by-Year	FT	Active Player	FT	Career Record	FT	Single Season Record	FT	Season

== See also ==
- List of NBA regular season records
