= Jack Stephens (basketball) =

American basketball player

Personal information
- Born: May 18, 1933
- Died: August 31, 2011 (aged 78)
- Listed height: 6 ft 3 in (1.91 m)
- Listed weight: 185 lb (84 kg)

Career information
- High school: Mount Carmel (Chicago, Illinois)
- College: Notre Dame (1951–1955)
- NBA draft: 1955: 2nd round, 7th overall pick
- Drafted by: St. Louis Hawks
- Position: Shooting guard
- Number: 15

Career history
- 1955–1956: St. Louis Hawks

Career highlights
- Second-team All-American – Collier's (1955); Third-team All-American – UPI (1955)
- Stats at NBA.com
- Stats at Basketball Reference

Jack Francis "Junior" Stephens (May 18, 1933 – August 31, 2011) was an American basketball player. He played one season in the National Basketball Association (NBA).

Stephens, a guard from Mount Carmel High School in Chicago, played college basketball for the Notre Dame Fighting Irish from 1951 to 1955. He was a standout for the Irish, raising his scoring average each year. In his senior season of 1954–55, Stephens averaged 20.9 points per game and was named an All-American by the United Press International (third team) and Collier's (second team).

He tied the Irish single-game scoring record with 35 points against Marquette in his final career game for Notre Dame. Stephens served as captain of the '54–55 Irish. Stephens played on Irish teams that finished 19–5 and 22–3 and qualified for the NCAA Championships his sophomore and junior years, respectively. In 1953 he was named to the NCAA All-Mideast Regional team.

Stephens also played one year of football for the Irish at halfback. After graduation, Stephens was drafted by the St. Louis Hawks in the second round (7th pick overall) of the 1955 NBA draft. He played one season for the Hawks, averaging 10.3 points and 5.2 rebounds per game in 72 appearances. Stephens later served as president of the University of Notre Dame Monogram Club from 1993 to 1994. On November 4, 2004, Stephens was named to the Irish All-Century Team.

Jack Stephens died on August 31, 2011, in Peoria, Illinois.

== Career statistics ==
Legend
GP	Games played	GS	Games started	MPG	Minutes per game
FG%	Field goal percentage	3P%	3-point field goal percentage	FT%	Free throw percentage
RPG	Rebounds per game	APG	Assists per game	SPG	Steals per game
BPG	Blocks per game	PPG	Points per game	**Bold**	Career high

=== NBA ===
==== Regular season ====
Year	Team	GP	MPG	FG%	FT%	RPG	APG	PPG
1955–56	St. Louis	72	30.8	.386	.692	5.2	2.9	10.3

==== Playoffs ====
Year	Team	GP	MPG	FG%	FT%	RPG	APG	PPG
1956	St. Louis	7	16.6	.293	.600	3.3	1.3	5.6
