= 1955–56 New York Knicks season =

Season of National Basketball Association team the New York Knicks

- Head coach: Joe Lapchick; Vince Boryla
- General manager: Ned Irish
- Arena: Madison Square Garden

Results
- Record: 35–37 (.486)
- Place: Division: 4th (Eastern)
- Playoff finish: Did not qualify (Lost Division third-place tiebreaker to Nationals, 0–1)
- Stats at Basketball Reference

Local media
- Television: WPIX (Bob Wolff, Bud Palmer)
- Radio: WINS (Les Keiter, Jim Gordon)

The 1955–56 New York Knickerbockers season was the tenth season for the team in the National Basketball Association (NBA). In the regular season, the Knickerbockers finished with a 35–37 record and tied for third place in the Eastern Division with the Syracuse Nationals. New York lost to the Nationals in a one-game playoff for a berth in the Eastern Division Semifinals.

== NBA draft ==
Note: This is not an extensive list; it only covers the first and second rounds, and any other players picked by the franchise that played at least one game in the league.

Round	Pick	Player	Position	Nationality	School/Club team
1	4	Ken Sears	F	United States	Santa Clara
2	11	Jerry Mullen	F	United States	San Francisco
3	19	Guy Sparrow	F	United States	Detroit

== Regular season ==
=== Season standings ===
Eastern Division	W	L	PCT	GB	Home	Road	Neutral	Div
x-Philadelphia Warriors	45	27	.625	-	21-7	11-17	13-3	22-14
x-Boston Celtics	39	33	.542	6	20-7	12-15	7-11	18-18
x-Syracuse Nationals	35	37	.486	10	23-8	9–19	3-10	15-21
New York Knicks	35	37	.486	10	13-15	16-13	6-9	17-19

x – clinched playoff spot

=== Game log ===
1955–56 Game log
#	Date	Opponent	Score	High points	Record
1	November 5	@ Rochester	100–98 (OT)	Carl Braun (23)	1–0
2	November 10	Minneapolis	105–112	Harry Gallatin (21)	2–0
3	November 12	Boston	95–96	Harry Gallatin (25)	3–0
4	November 13	N Rochester	91–94	Ray Felix (18)	4–0
5	November 15	@ St. Louis	95–121	Ken Sears (26)	4–1
6	November 17	N Fort Wayne	110–88	Ray Felix (24)	5–1
7	November 19	St. Louis	104–91	Ray Felix (13)	5–2
8	November 20	@ Fort Wayne	119–115 (OT)	Harry Gallatin (25)	6–2
9	November 23	@ Boston	115–111 (OT)	Ray Felix (24)	7–2
10	November 24	@ Philadelphia	97–118	Carl Braun (26)	7–3
11	November 26	Syracuse	99–100	Ray Felix (31)	8–3
12	November 27	@ Syracuse	74–85	Ray Felix (14)	8–4
13	November 29	Fort Wayne	104–99	Baechtold, Sears (18)	8–5
14	December 1	N Minneapolis	90–97	Ray Felix (22)	8–6
15	December 3	Philadelphia	109–102	Dick McGuire (28)	8–7
16	December 6	Rochester	105–116	Gallatin, McGuire (23)	9–7
17	December 10	@ St. Louis	99–80	Ray Felix (18)	10–7
18	December 13	Minneapolis	91–98	Bob Peterson (19)	11–7
19	December 14	@ Boston	100–102	Carl Braun (28)	11–8
20	December 17	@ Fort Wayne	100–95	Carl Braun (20)	12–8
21	December 18	Boston	95–92	Ray Felix (21)	12–9
22	December 20	Syracuse	98–91	Carl Braun (20)	12–10
23	December 25	@ Fort Wayne	87–92	Carl Braun (18)	12–11
24	December 26	@ Philadelphia	108–97	Ken Sears (26)	13–11
25	December 27	Philadelphia	79–80	Carl Braun (15)	14–11
26	December 28	@ Rochester	113–91	Carl Braun (23)	15–11
27	December 31	@ Syracuse	92–101	Harry Gallatin (19)	15–12
28	January 1	Rochester	101–92	Walter Dukes (17)	15–13
29	January 3	N Boston	107–97	Harry Gallatin (23)	16–13
30	January 4	N Boston	103–86	Ken Sears (20)	17–13
31	January 5	Boston	92–87	Ray Felix (15)	17–14
32	January 7	@ Philadelphia	97–104	Dukes, Sears (19)	17–15
33	January 8	Philadelphia	95–83	Harry Gallatin (34)	17–16
34	January 14	St. Louis	104–101 (2OT)	Harry Gallatin (23)	17–17
35	January 15	@ Boston	109–104 (OT)	Baechtold, Shue (22)	18–17
36	January 17	Rochester	107–112	Carl Braun (25)	19–17
37	January 18	@ Rochester	103–108	Jim Baechtold (25)	19–18
38	January 20	N Minneapolis	122–109	Ken Sears (27)	20–18
39	January 21	Minneapolis	109–89	Ray Felix (24)	20–19
40	January 22	@ Minneapolis	100–95	Harry Gallatin (31)	21–19
41	January 25	@ Minneapolis	95–104	Ken Sears (28)	21–20
42	January 27	N Rochester	111–93	Baechtold, Braun (18)	21–21
43	January 28	Fort Wayne	92–91 (OT)	Nathaniel Clifton (20)	21–22
44	January 29	@ Syracuse	99–95 (OT)	Carl Braun (23)	22–22
45	January 31	Philadelphia	95–105	Harry Gallatin (21)	23–22
46	February 1	@ Philadelphia	105–104 (2OT)	Ken Sears (23)	24–22
47	February 2	N Philadelphia	88–87	Braun, Gallatin (19)	24–23
48	February 4	Syracuse	103–94	Carl Braun (25)	24–24
49	February 5	@ Boston	104–114	Jim Baechtold (22)	24–25
50	February 7	Boston	102–113	Ken Sears (24)	25–25
51	February 8	@ Rochester	102–97	Ken Sears (26)	26–25
52	February 10	N Syracuse	94–88	Jim Baechtold (27)	26–26
53	February 11	St. Louis	91–107	Dick McGuire (20)	27–26
54	February 12	@ Boston	108–116	Carl Braun (22)	27–27
55	February 14	@ St. Louis	103–99	Harry Gallatin (19)	28–27
56	February 15	N Minneapolis	102–113	Carl Braun (31)	28–28
57	February 17	N Syracuse	91–86	Ray Felix (21)	28–29
58	February 19	@ Syracuse	98–118	Jim Baechtold (26)	28–30
59	February 21	Syracuse	108–107 (2OT)	Ray Felix (32)	28–31
60	February 22	@ Philadelphia	117–108	Ken Sears (23)	29–31
61	February 25	St. Louis	99–89	Ray Felix (19)	29–32
62	February 26	@ St. Louis	85–103	Nathaniel Clifton (16)	29–33
63	February 27	N St. Louis	109–113	Carl Braun (44)	30–33
64	February 28	Fort Wayne	99–95	Carl Braun (24)	30–34
65	March 2	N Fort Wayne	97–104	Ken Sears (24)	30–35
66	March 4	@ Syracuse	118–111 (2OT)	Harry Gallatin (24)	31–35
67	March 6	Boston	99–119	Ray Felix (23)	32–35
68	March 7	N Philadelphia	108–87	Ken Sears (21)	32–36
69	March 10	Syracuse	84–104	Carl Braun (17)	33–36
70	March 11	@ Fort Wayne	122–96	Carl Braun (27)	34–36
71	March 13	N Minneapolis	89–102	Ken Sears (24)	34–37
72	March 14	Philadelphia	108–115	Ken Sears (23)	35–37

== Division Tiebreaker ==
- Note: Tiebreaker games do not count as official playoff games.

1956 playoff game log
Division Tiebreaker (failed to qualify)

Game	Date	Team	Score	High points	High rebounds	High assists	Location	Record
1	March 15	@ Syracuse	L 77–82	Harry Gallatin (19)	Ray Felix (13)	Dick McGuire (9)	Onondaga War Memorial	0–1

1956 schedule
