= 1955–56 Boston Celtics season =

NBA basketball team season

- Head coach: Red Auerbach
- Arena: Boston Garden

Results
- Record: 39–33 (.542)
- Place: Division: 2nd (Eastern)
- Playoff finish: East Division Semi-finals (lost to Nationals 1–2)
- Stats at Basketball Reference

Local media
- Television: WBZ-TV/WNAC-TV
- Radio: WHDH (Johnny Most)

The 1955–56 Boston Celtics season was the Celtics' tenth season in the NBA. This was the last time the Celtics failed to advance to the NBA Finals until 1966–67, as they were eliminated by the Syracuse Nationals in three games of the East Division Semi-finals.

== Regular season ==
Eastern Division	W	L	PCT	GB	Home	Road	Neutral	Div
x-Philadelphia Warriors	45	27	.625	-	21-7	11-17	13-3	22-14
x-Boston Celtics	39	33	.542	6	20-7	12-15	7-11	18-18
x-Syracuse Nationals	35	37	.486	10	23-8	9–19	3-10	15-21
New York Knicks	35	37	.486	10	13-15	16-13	6-9	17-19

x = clinched playoff spot

=== Game log ===
1955–56 game log
#	Date	Opponent	Score	High points	Record
1	November 5	Philadelphia	87–98	Bob Cousy (31)	1–0
2	November 11	Minneapolis	75–119	Ed Macauley (23)	2–0
3	November 12	@ New York	95–96	Ed Macauley (24)	2–1
4	November 17	@ Philadelphia	92–106	Bill Sharman (23)	2–2
5	November 19	Fort Wayne	102–104	Bill Sharman (20)	3–2
6	November 23	New York	115–111 (OT)	Ed Macauley (26)	3–3
7	November 24	@ Syracuse	103–111	Bob Cousy (23)	3–4
8	November 26	@ Rochester	104–103	Bill Sharman (32)	4–4
9	November 29	N Syracuse	97–105	Ed Macauley (27)	5–4
10	December 2	St. Louis	81–94	Ed Macauley (26)	6–4
11	December 4	@ Fort Wayne	90–111	Ed Macauley (19)	6–5
12	December 6	@ St. Louis	122–99	Macauley, Sharman (25)	7–5
13	December 9	N Rochester	109–108	Ed Macauley (28)	7–6
14	December 10	Minneapolis	102–118	Loscutoff, Macauley (18)	8–6
15	December 11	@ Syracuse	89–101	Jack Nichols (18)	8–7
16	December 13	N Philadelphia	109–108	Bob Cousy (29)	8–8
17	December 14	New York	100–102	Ed Macauley (23)	9–8
18	December 17	Syracuse	110–104	Bill Sharman (33)	9–9
19	December 18	@ New York	95–92	Cousy, Loscutoff (20)	10–9
20	December 20	N Minneapolis	99–100	Cousy, Nichols (22)	11–9
21	December 25	@ Minneapolis	115–112	Cousy, Sharman (25)	12–9
22	December 27	@ St. Louis	105–102	Ed Macauley (24)	13–9
23	December 30	N Syracuse	103–110	Jack Nichols (25)	14–9
24	December 31	@ Rochester	112–100	Bill Sharman (21)	15–9
25	January 1	Philadelphia	113–121	Jack Nichols (31)	16–9
26	January 3	N New York	107–97	Cousy, Macauley (19)	16–10
27	January 4	N New York	103–86	Bill Sharman (25)	16–11
28	January 5	@ New York	92–87	Jack Nichols (24)	17–11
29	January 7	@ Syracuse	105–99 (OT)	Bob Cousy (32)	18–11
30	January 8	Rochester	111–109	Cousy, Sharman (21)	18–12
31	January 10	@ Fort Wayne	89–105	Bill Sharman (25)	18–13
32	January 11	N Minneapolis	114–110	Bob Cousy (24)	18–14
33	January 13	Syracuse	104–119	Cousy, Sharman (23)	19–14
34	January 14	@ Philadelphia	104–103	Bill Sharman (22)	20–14
35	January 15	New York	109–104 (OT)	Ed Macauley (21)	20–15
36	January 17	N Fort Wayne	85–91	Bob Cousy (20)	21–15
37	January 18	N Fort Wayne	90–95	Bob Cousy (23)	22–15
38	January 20	St. Louis	112–133	Bill Sharman (25)	23–15
39	January 21	N Syracuse	96–100	Bill Sharman (21)	24–15
40	January 22	Philadelphia	129–115	Cousy, Macauley (27)	24–16
41	January 23	N Philadelphia	120–104	Ed Macauley (31)	24–17
42	January 25	N Fort Wayne	101–100	Ed Macauley (23)	24–18
43	January 27	Fort Wayne	106–97	Cousy, Nichols (16)	24–19
44	January 28	@ Rochester	126–119	Bob Cousy (29)	25–19
45	January 29	Rochester	103–112	Bob Cousy (29)	26–19
46	January 31	@ St. Louis	91–114	Dickie Hemric (16)	26–20
47	February 1	@ Minneapolis	106–107	Ed Macauley (26)	26–21
48	February 2	N Minneapolis	101–102	Bill Sharman (35)	27–21
49	February 4	@ Rochester	69–83	Ed Macauley (15)	27–22
50	February 5	New York	104–114	Bill Sharman (24)	28–22
51	February 7	@ New York	102–113	Bill Sharman (29)	28–23
52	February 8	N St. Louis	111–110	Ed Macauley (27)	28–24
53	February 9	@ Syracuse	98–97	Jack Nichols (23)	29–24
54	February 10	St. Louis	100–124	Bill Sharman (30)	30–24
55	February 12	New York	108–116	Bill Sharman (29)	31–24
56	February 18	N Philadelphia	115–101	Bob Cousy (27)	31–25
57	February 19	Philadelphia	118–120	Bob Cousy (24)	32–25
58	February 21	@ St. Louis	97–101	Bill Sharman (26)	32–26
59	February 22	@ Minneapolis	93–90	Ed Macauley (22)	33–26
60	February 24	@ Philadelphia	129–135	Bill Sharman (33)	33–27
61	February 26	Rochester	100–111	Bob Cousy (27)	34–27
62	February 28	N Rochester	113–97	Bill Sharman (18)	34–28
63	February 29	Fort Wayne	99–106	Bob Cousy (22)	35–28
64	March 1	@ Syracuse	100–111	Bob Cousy (21)	35–29
65	March 2	Minneapolis	113–119	Cousy, Sharman (23)	36–29
66	March 4	Philadelphia	114–128	Bob Cousy (29)	37–29
67	March 6	@ New York	99–119	Bob Cousy (24)	37–30
68	March 7	Syracuse	98–111	Bill Sharman (24)	38–30
69	March 8	@ Philadelphia	120–142	Bill Sharman (33)	38–31
70	March 10	N Fort Wayne	106–103	Togo Palazzi (21)	38–32
71	March 11	St. Louis	127–121	Bill Sharman (27)	38–33
72	March 14	Syracuse	103–122	Bill Sharman (25)	39–33

== Playoffs ==
1956 playoff game log
Division Semi-finals: 1–2 (home: 1–1; road: 0–1)

Game	Date	Team	Score	High points	High rebounds	High assists	Location	Series
1	March 17	Syracuse	W 110–93	Bob Cousy (29)	—	Bob Cousy (9)	Boston Garden	1–0
2	March 19	@ Syracuse	L 98–101	Bob Cousy (28)	Arnie Risen (17)	Bob Cousy (10)	Onondaga War Memorial	1–1
3	March 21	Syracuse	L 97–102	Bill Sharman (24)	Arnie Risen (15)	Bob Cousy (7)	Boston Garden	1–2

1956 schedule

== Awards and records ==
- Bob Cousy, All-NBA First Team
- Bill Sharman, All-NBA First Team
