= 1955–56 Philadelphia Warriors season =

Professional basketball team season (won NBA championship)

- NBA champions
- Division champions
- Head coach: George Senesky
- Arena: Philadelphia Civic Center

Results
- Record: 45–27 (.625)
- Place: Division: 1st (Eastern)
- Playoff finish: NBA champions
- Stats at Basketball Reference

Local media
- Television: WPTZ/WCAU/WFIL
- Radio: WIBG (Bill Campbell)

The 1955–56 Philadelphia Warriors season George Senesky took over for Eddie Gottlieb as coach, the Warriors had a strong start by winning 12 of their first 16 games. Paul Arizin and Neil Johnston were among the league's scoring leaders as the Warriors won the Eastern Division with a 45–27 record. The addition of rookie Tom Gola made the difference. In his first season Gola averaged 9.1 rebounds and 5.9 assists per game. In the Eastern Division Finals the Warriors beat the Syracuse Nationals in 5 games. In the NBA Finals, the Warriors won their 2nd Championship by beating the Fort Wayne Pistons 4 games to 1. The Warriors' 1956 championship marked the first NBA Finals championship won by a team that was established in the National Basketball Association itself (or in this case, the Basketball Association of America precursor) since the Warriors' 1947 BAA Finals championship during the league's inaugural season after the BAA/NBA's prior champions up until this point were won by the American Basketball League's original rendition of the Baltimore Bullets (who have since gone defunct) and the National Basketball League's Minneapolis Lakers, Rochester Royals, and Syracuse Nationals. HoopsHype would later rank this championship squad as tied with the 1956–57 Boston Celtics from a season later team as the team with the second-easiest path to the NBA Finals ever in 2024 due to them being one of three total championship teams who had playoff opponents that averaged around an average overall record or less during their championship run.

== Roster ==
1955–56 Philadelphia Warriors roster
Players

Pos.	No.	Player	Height	Weight	DOB	From
F	11	Paul Arizin	6 ft 4 in (1.93 m)	190 lb (86 kg)		Villanova
G	7	Ernie Beck	6 ft 4 in (1.93 m)	190 lb (86 kg)		Penn
F/C	12	Walt Davis	6 ft 8 in (2.03 m)	205 lb (93 kg)		Texas A&M
G	5	George Dempsey	6 ft 2 in (1.88 m)	190 lb (86 kg)		King's (NY)
G	17	Jack George	6 ft 2 in (1.88 m)	190 lb (86 kg)		La Salle
G/F	15	Tom Gola	6 ft 6 in (1.98 m)	205 lb (93 kg)		La Salle
F/C	9	Joe Graboski	6 ft 7 in (2.01 m)	195 lb (88 kg)		Tuley HS (IL)
G	4	Larry Hennessy	6 ft 3 in (1.91 m)	185 lb (84 kg)		Villanova
C	6	Neil Johnston	6 ft 8 in (2.03 m)	210 lb (95 kg)		Ohio State
F	14	Jackie Moore	6 ft 5 in (1.96 m)	180 lb (82 kg)		La Salle
G	25	Bob Schafer	6 ft 3 in (1.91 m)	195 lb (88 kg)		Villanova

Coaches
Head coach
- George Senesky

Legend
- (DP) Unsigned draft pick
- (FA) Free agent
- (S) Suspended
- Injured

== Regular season ==
=== Season standings ===
Eastern Division	W	L	PCT	GB	Home	Road	Neutral	Div
x-Philadelphia Warriors	45	27	.625	-	21-7	11-17	13-3	22-14
x-Boston Celtics	39	33	.542	6	20-7	12-15	7-11	18-18
x-Syracuse Nationals	35	37	.486	10	23-8	9–19	3-10	15-21
New York Knicks	35	37	.486	10	13-15	16-13	6-9	17-19

== Game log ==
1955–56 Game log
#	Date	Opponent	Score	High points	Record
1	November 5	@ Boston	W 98–87	Joe Graboski (18)	1–0
2	November 9	Minneapolis	L 106–117	Neil Johnston (29)	1–1
3	November 10	vs. Rochester	W 89–84	Paul Arizin (33)	2–1
4	November 12	vs. Minneapolis	W 100–89	Paul Arizin (34)	3–1
5	November 17	Boston	W 106–92	Joe Graboski (21)	4–1
6	November 19	Syracuse	W 102–94	Neil Johnston (37)	5–1
7	November 23	vs. Syracuse	W 104–101	Arizin, George (23)	6–1
8	November 24	New York	W 118–97	Neil Johnston (32)	7–1
9	November 26	Fort Wayne	W 87–82	Paul Arizin (22)	8–1
10	November 27	@ Minneapolis	L 94–99	Paul Arizin (24)	8–2
11	November 29	@ St. Louis	L 95–108	Jack George (15)	8–3
12	December 1	St. Louis	W 115–98	Neil Johnston (31)	9–3
13	December 3	@ New York	W 109–102	Paul Arizin (32)	10–3
14	December 4	@ Rochester	L 84–107	Neil Johnston (21)	10–4
15	December 6	vs. Minneapolis	W 116–103	Neil Johnston (32)	11–4
16	December 9	Syracuse	W 101–92	Jack George (30)	12–4
17	December 11	@ Fort Wayne	91–96	Paul Arizin (21)	12–5
18	December 13	vs. Boston	109–108	Neil Johnston (29)	13–5
19	December 15	Fort Wayne	73–80	Neil Johnston (22)	14–5
20	December 18	@ Syracuse	79–99	Neil Johnston (17)	14–6
21	December 21	@ Rochester	96–92	Neil Johnston (21)	15–6
22	December 26	New York	108–97	Paul Arizin (22)	15–7
23	December 27	@ New York	79–80	Paul Arizin (29)	15–8
24	December 29	Syracuse	83–112	Paul Arizin (20)	16–8
25	January 1	@ Boston	113–121	Paul Arizin (37)	16–9
26	January 2	vs. Rochester	100–130	Paul Arizin (23)	17–9
27	January 3	Fort Wayne	82–102	Tom Gola (20)	18–9
28	January 4	@ Syracuse	88–87	Neil Johnston (26)	19–9
29	January 5	vs. Fort Wayne	81–92	Joe Graboski (31)	19–10
30	January 7	New York	97–104	Neil Johnston (24)	20–10
31	January 8	@ New York	95–83	Neil Johnston (28)	21–10
32	January 10	St. Louis	107–109 (OT)	Neil Johnston (35)	22–10
33	January 11	@ Rochester	97–94	Paul Arizin (32)	23–10
34	January 12	Rochester	94–123	Neil Johnston (23)	24–10
35	January 14	Boston	104–103	Paul Arizin (27)	24–11
36	January 15	@ St. Louis	108–96	Paul Arizin (35)	25–11
37	January 18	vs. Minneapolis	94–105	Neil Johnston (28)	25–12
38	January 21	Fort Wayne	92–91	Joe Graboski (28)	25–13
39	January 22	@ Boston	129–115	Paul Arizin (39)	26–13
40	January 23	vs. Boston	120–104	Neil Johnston (29)	27–13
41	January 25	Syracuse	100–112	Paul Arizin (26)	28–13
42	January 26	@ Syracuse	89–100	Paul Arizin (23)	28–14
43	January 28	@ Minneapolis	108–85	Paul Arizin (33)	29–14
44	January 29	@ Fort Wayne	85–99	Paul Arizin (20)	29–15
45	January 31	@ New York	95–105	Paul Arizin (38)	29–16
46	February 1	New York	105–104 (2OT)	Joe Graboski (29)	29–17
47	February 2	vs. New York	88–87	Paul Arizin (31)	30–17
48	February 3	Rochester	105–96	Paul Arizin (31)	30–18
49	February 5	@ St. Louis	93–105	Paul Arizin (22)	30–19
50	February 7	vs. Syracuse	95–128	Neil Johnston (41)	31–19
51	February 9	St. Louis	97–108	Paul Arizin (34)	32–19
52	February 11	@ Minneapolis	117–102	Paul Arizin (34)	33–19
53	February 12	@ St. Louis	87–79	Neil Johnston (22)	34–19
54	February 13	vs. Fort Wayne	105–94	Paul Arizin (26)	35–19
55	February 15	vs. Fort Wayne	101–78	Paul Arizin (25)	36–19
56	February 17	Minneapolis	111–134	Arizin, Johnston (29)	37–19
57	February 18	vs. Boston	115–101	Neil Johnston (38)	38–19
58	February 19	@ Boston	118–120	Paul Arizin (39)	38–20
59	February 22	New York	117–108	Neil Johnston (29)	38–21
60	February 24	Boston	W 129–135	Joe Graboski (35)	39–21
61	February 26	@ Syracuse	W 87–85	Paul Arizin (26)	40–21
62	February 29	Rochester	W 86–81	Neil Johnston (21)	41–21
63	March 1	Minneapolis	L 100–102	Joe Graboski (28)	41–22
64	March 3	Syracuse	W 102–96	Paul Arizin (31)	42–22
65	March 4	@ Boston	114–128	Paul Arizin (39)	42–23
66	March 6	vs. St. Louis	102–97	Paul Arizin (31)	42–24
67	March 7	vs. New York	108–87	Neil Johnston (34)	43–24
68	March 8	Boston	120–142	Arizin, Johnston (29)	44–24
69	March 10	@ Rochester	L 96–111	Paul Arizin (21)	44–25
70	March 11	@ Syracuse	L 88–99	Paul Arizin (20)	44–26
71	March 13	St. Louis	W 116–113	Jack George (33)	45–26
72	March 14	@ New York	L 108–115	Neil Johnston (27)	45–27

== Playoffs ==
1956 playoff game log
Division Finals: 3–2 (home: 3–0; road: 0–2)

Game	Date	Team	Score	High points	High rebounds	High assists	Location	Series
1	March 23	Syracuse	W 109–87	Paul Arizin (29)	Neil Johnston (24)	Gola, Beck (5)	Philadelphia Civic Center	1–0
2	March 25	@ Syracuse	L 112–118	Neil Johnston (43)	Neil Johnston (16)	Neil Johnston (7)	Onondaga War Memorial	1–1
3	March 27	Syracuse	W 119–96	Joe Graboski (20)	Neil Johnston (18)	Tom Gola (10)	Philadelphia Civic Center	2–1
4	March 28	@ Syracuse	L 104–108	Neil Johnston (35)	Neil Johnston (12)	Neil Johnston (7)	Onondaga War Memorial	2–2
5	March 29	Syracuse	W 109–104	Paul Arizin (35)	Neil Johnston (18)	Neil Johnston (8)	Philadelphia Civic Center	3–2

NBA Finals: 4–1 (home: 3–0; road: 1–1)

Game	Date	Team	Score	High points	High rebounds	High assists	Location Attendance	Series
1	March 31	Fort Wayne	W 98–94	Paul Arizin (28)	Neil Johnston (14)	Tom Gola (10)	Philadelphia Civic Center; 4,128	1–0
2	April 1	@ Fort Wayne	L 83–84	Paul Arizin (27)	Arizin, Johnston (9)	Ernie Beck (6)	War Memorial Coliseum; 6,976	1–1
3	April 3	Fort Wayne	W 100–96	Paul Arizin (27)	Neil Johnston (14)	Tom Gola (8)	Philadelphia Civic Center; 11,698	2–1
4	April 5	@ Fort Wayne	W 107–105	Paul Arizin (30)	Tom Gola (9)	Joe Graboski (7)	War Memorial Coliseum; 7,852	3–1
5	April 7	Fort Wayne	W 99–88	Joe Graboski (29)	Joe Graboski (16)	Jack George (10)	Philadelphia Civic Center; 11,194	4–1

1956 schedule

== Awards and honors ==
- Paul Arizin, NBA All-Star Game
- Neil Johnston, NBA All-Star Game
- Neil Johnston, All-NBA First Team
- Paul Arizin, All-NBA First Team
- Jack George, All-NBA Second Team
