= 1955–56 NBA season =

10th NBA season

- League: National Basketball Association
- Sport: Basketball
- Duration: November 5, 1955 – March 14, 1956; March 15–16, 1956 (Play-in tournaments); March 15–29, 1956 (Playoffs); March 31 – April 7, 1956 (Finals)
- Games: 72
- Teams: 8
- TV partner: NBC

Draft
- Top draft pick: Dick Ricketts
- Picked by: St. Louis Hawks

Regular season
- Season champions: Philadelphia Warriors
- Season MVP: Bob Pettit (St. Louis)
- Top scorer: Bob Pettit (St. Louis)

Playoffs
- Eastern champions: Philadelphia Warriors
- Eastern runners-up: Syracuse Nationals
- Western champions: Fort Wayne Pistons
- Western runners-up: St. Louis Hawks

Finals
- Champions: Philadelphia Warriors
- Runners-up: Fort Wayne Pistons

NBA seasons
- ← 1954–55 1956–57 →

The 1955–56 NBA season was the 10th season of the National Basketball Association. The season ended with the Philadelphia Warriors winning the NBA championship, beating the Fort Wayne Pistons 4 games to 1 in the NBA Finals.

== Notable occurrences ==
- The Hawks relocate from Milwaukee, Wisconsin to St. Louis, Missouri.
- The NBA hands out a Most Valuable Player award for the first time. Its inaugural recipient is Bob Pettit of the St. Louis Hawks. Also, the All-NBA teams are no longer positionless and now have two guards, two forwards, and a center on each team.
- The 1956 NBA All-Star Game was played in Rochester, New York, with the West beating the East 108–94. Bob Pettit of the St. Louis Hawks wins the game's MVP award.

Coaching changes
Offseason
Team	1954–55 coach	1955–56 coach
Philadelphia Warriors	Edward Gottlieb	George Senesky
Rochester Royals	Les Harrison	Bobby Wanzer
In-season
Team	Outgoing coach	Incoming coach
New York Knicks	Joe Lapchick	Vince Boryla

== Final standings ==
=== Eastern Division ===
Eastern Division	W	L	PCT	GB	Home	Road	Neutral	Div
x-Philadelphia Warriors	45	27	.625	-	21-7	11-17	13-3	22-14
x-Boston Celtics	39	33	.542	6	20-7	12-15	7-11	18-18
x-Syracuse Nationals	35	37	.486	10	23-8	9–19	3-10	15-21
New York Knicks	35	37	.486	10	13-15	16-13	6-9	17-19

- Syracuse finished ahead of New York by defeating them in a tiebreaker match.

=== Western Division ===
Western Division	W	L	PCT	GB	Home	Road	Neutral	Div
x-Fort Wayne Pistons	37	35	.514	-	19-7	10-17	8-11	19-17
x-Minneapolis Lakers	33	39	.458	4	14-12	6-21	13-6	19-17
x-St. Louis Hawks	33	39	.458	4	15-11	11-17	7-11	18-18
Rochester Royals	31	41	.431	6	15-14	6-21	10-6	16-20

- Minneapolis finished ahead of St. Louis by defeating them in a tiebreaker match.

x – clinched playoff spot

== Playoffs ==
Division Semifinals
E3	Syracuse	2
E2	Boston	1
W3	St. Louis	2
W2	Minneapolis	1

Division Finals
Eastern Division
E1	Philadelphia*	3
E3	Syracuse	2
Western Division
W1	Fort Wayne*	3
W3	St. Louis	2

NBA Finals
E1	Philadelphia*	4
W1	Fort Wayne*	1

- * Division winner
- Bold Series winner
- Italic Team with home-court advantage in NBA Finals

== Statistics leaders ==
Category	Player	Team	Stat
Points	Bob Pettit	St. Louis Hawks	1,849
Rebounds	Bob Pettit	St. Louis Hawks	1,164
Assists	Bob Cousy	Boston Celtics	642
FG%	Neil Johnston	Philadelphia Warriors	.457
FT%	Bill Sharman	Boston Celtics	.867

Note: Prior to the 1969–70 season, league leaders in points, rebounds, and assists were determined by totals rather than averages.

== NBA awards ==
- Most Valuable Player: Bob Pettit, St. Louis Hawks
- Rookie of the Year: Maurice Stokes, Rochester Royals
- All-NBA First Team:
  - F – Paul Arizin, Philadelphia Warriors
  - F – Bob Pettit, St. Louis Hawks
  - C – Neil Johnston, Philadelphia Warriors
  - G – Bob Cousy, Boston Celtics
  - G – Bill Sharman, Boston Celtics
- All-NBA Second Team:
  - F – Dolph Schayes, Syracuse Nationals
  - F – Maurice Stokes, Rochester Royals
  - C – Clyde Lovellette, Minneapolis Lakers
  - G – Jack George, Philadelphia Warriors
  - G – Slater Martin, Minneapolis Lakers

== See also ==
- List of NBA regular season records
