= 1955–56 Syracuse Nationals season =

Season for the Nationals in the National Basketball Association

- Head coach: Al Cervi
- Arena: Onondaga War Memorial

Results
- Record: 35–37 (.486)
- Place: Division: 3rd (Eastern)
- Playoff finish: East Division Finals (lost to Warriors 2–3)
- Stats at Basketball Reference

Local media
- Television: WSYR-TV
- Radio: WSYR

The 1955–56 Syracuse Nationals season was the Nationals' 7th season in the NBA. The team entered the season as the defending NBA champions. Finishing 3rd in the East with a 35–37 record, they clinched a berth in the 1956 NBA playoffs and defeated the Boston Celtics in three games of the East Division Semifinals. However, they were unable to defend their title as they were eliminated by the Philadelphia Warriors in five games of the East Division Finals.

== Roster ==
1955–56 Syracuse Nationals roster
Players

Pos.	No.	Player	Height	Weight	DOB	From
G/F		Ed Conlin	6 ft 5 in (1.96 m)	200 lb (91 kg)	1933-09-02	Fordham
G/F		Dick Farley	6 ft 4 in (1.93 m)	190 lb (86 kg)	1932-04-13	Indiana
G/F		Billy Kenville	6 ft 2 in (1.88 m)	187 lb (85 kg)	1930-12-01	St. Bonaventure
F/C		Johnny Kerr	6 ft 9 in (2.06 m)	230 lb (104 kg)	1932-08-17	Illinois
G		George King	6 ft 0 in (1.83 m)	175 lb (79 kg)	1928-08-16	College of Charleston
F/C		Earl Lloyd	6 ft 5 in (1.96 m)	200 lb (91 kg)	1928-04-03	West Virginia State
F/C		Red Rocha	6 ft 8 in (2.03 m)	185 lb (84 kg)	1923-09-18	Oregon State
F/C		Dolph Schayes	6 ft 7 in (2.01 m)	195 lb (88 kg)	1928-05-19	NYU
G/F		Paul Seymour	6 ft 1 in (1.85 m)	180 lb (82 kg)	1928-01-30	Toledo
F		Jim Tucker	6 ft 7 in (2.01 m)	185 lb (84 kg)	1932-12-11	Duquesne

Coaches
Head coach

Al Cervi

Legend
- (DP) Unsigned draft pick
- (FA) Free agent
- (S) Suspended
- Injured

Roster

== Regular season ==
=== Season standings ===
Eastern Division	W	L	PCT	GB	Home	Road	Neutral	Div
x-Philadelphia Warriors	45	27	.625	-	21-7	11-17	13-3	22-14
x-Boston Celtics	39	33	.542	6	20-7	12-15	7-11	18-18
x-Syracuse Nationals	35	37	.486	10	23-8	9–19	3-10	15-21
New York Knicks	35	37	.486	10	13-15	16-13	6-9	17-19

x – clinched playoff spot

=== Game log ===
1955–56 Game log
#	Date	Opponent	Score	High points	Record
1	November 5	Fort Wayne	113–114 (OT)	Paul Seymour (19)	1–0
2	November 6	@ Rochester	80–83	Dolph Schayes (15)	1–1
3	November 12	@ St. Louis	91–81	Johnny Kerr (25)	2–1
4	November 13	@ Fort Wayne	79–93	Johnny Kerr (16)	2–2
5	November 17	Minneapolis	91–105	Dolph Schayes (25)	3–2
6	November 19	@ Philadelphia	94–102	Dolph Schayes (25)	3–3
7	November 20	St. Louis	80–84	Paul Seymour (17)	4–3
8	November 23	N Philadelphia	101–104	Dolph Schayes (31)	4–4
9	November 24	Boston	103–111	George King (29)	5–4
10	November 26	@ New York	99–100	Red Rocha (29)	5–5
11	November 27	New York	74–85	Dolph Schayes (19)	6–5
12	November 29	N Boston	97–105	George King (31)	6–6
13	December 3	Minneapolis	103–114	Red Rocha (23)	7–6
14	December 4	@ Minneapolis	102–96	George King (25)	8–6
15	December 6	N Fort Wayne	88–90	Dolph Schayes (21)	8–7
16	December 8	@ Fort Wayne	94–105	Dolph Schayes (20)	8–8
17	December 9	@ Philadelphia	92–101	Johnny Kerr (20)	8–9
18	December 11	Boston	89–101	Dolph Schayes (26)	9–9
19	December 15	Minneapolis	135–133 (3OT)	Dolph Schayes (34)	9–10
20	December 17	@ Boston	110–104	Dolph Schayes (28)	10–10
21	December 18	Philadelphia	79–99	Johnny Kerr (18)	11–10
22	December 20	@ New York	98–91	Johnny Kerr (29)	12–10
23	December 25	Rochester	96–111	Johnny Kerr (20)	13–10
24	December 26	@ Rochester	91–93	Dolph Schayes (27)	13–11
25	December 27	N Rochester	80–91	Dolph Schayes (14)	13–12
26	December 29	@ Philadelphia	83–112	Dolph Schayes (16)	13–13
27	December 30	N Boston	103–110	Johnny Kerr (21)	13–14
28	December 31	New York	92–101	Dolph Schayes (19)	14–14
29	January 1	@ Minneapolis	85–80	Dolph Schayes (19)	15–14
30	January 2	@ St. Louis	84–82	Ed Conlin (17)	16–14
31	January 4	Philadelphia	88–87	Dolph Schayes (21)	16–15
32	January 7	Boston	105–99 (OT)	George King (19)	16–16
33	January 8	@ Minneapolis	91–99	Dolph Schayes (24)	16–17
34	January 10	N Minneapolis	79–90	Dolph Schayes (14)	16–18
35	January 12	St. Louis	78–93	Bill Kenville (19)	17–18
36	January 13	@ Boston	104–119	Dolph Schayes (27)	17–19
37	January 14	@ Rochester	93–102	Dolph Schayes (26)	17–20
38	January 15	Rochester	88–99	Lloyd, Schayes (18)	18–20
39	January 19	Minneapolis	100–122	Johnny Kerr (27)	19–20
40	January 21	N Boston	96–100	Conlin, Kerr (19)	19–21
41	January 22	St. Louis	109–105	Dolph Schayes (24)	19–22
42	January 25	@ Philadelphia	100–112	Dolph Schayes (23)	19–23
43	January 26	Philadelphia	89–100	Kenville, Schayes (26)	20–23
44	January 28	@ St. Louis	85–93	Dolph Schayes (25)	20–24
45	January 29	New York	99–95 (OT)	Earl Lloyd (17)	20–25
46	February 1	@ Rochester	77–83	Lloyd, Schayes (18)	20–26
47	February 2	Rochester	89–97	Paul Seymour (19)	21–26
48	February 4	@ New York	103–94	Dolph Schayes (28)	22–26
49	February 5	Fort Wayne	85–90	Dolph Schayes (25)	23–26
50	February 6	@ Fort Wayne	98–99	Dolph Schayes (25)	23–27
51	February 7	N Philadelphia	95–128	Dolph Schayes (24)	23–28
52	February 9	Boston	98–97	Johnny Kerr (27)	23–29
53	February 10	N New York	94–88	Ed Conlin (18)	24–29
54	February 12	Rochester	74–101	Dolph Schayes (20)	25–29
55	February 17	N New York	91–86	Dolph Schayes (29)	26–29
56	February 18	Fort Wayne	84–85	Johnny Kerr (16)	27–29
57	February 19	New York	98–118	Dolph Schayes (31)	28–29
58	February 21	@ New York	108–107 (2OT)	Dolph Schayes (19)	29–29
59	February 23	Fort Wayne	92–94	Paul Seymour (23)	30–29
60	February 24	N St. Louis	103–116	George King (27)	30–30
61	February 26	Philadelphia	87–85	Dolph Schayes (38)	30–31
62	February 27	@ Fort Wayne	98–95 (OT)	Dolph Schayes (19)	31–31
63	February 29	N Minneapolis	94–98	Dolph Schayes (32)	31–32
64	March 1	Boston	100–111	Dolph Schayes (23)	32–32
65	March 3	@ Philadelphia	96–102	Dolph Schayes (27)	32–33
66	March 4	New York	118–111 (2OT)	Dolph Schayes (29)	32–34
67	March 7	@ Boston	98–111	Paul Seymour (21)	32–35
68	March 8	St. Louis	88–92	Dolph Schayes (19)	33–35
69	March 10	@ New York	84–104	Dolph Schayes (26)	33–36
70	March 11	Philadelphia	88–99	Dolph Schayes (29)	34–36
71	March 12	N St. Louis	97–92	Dolph Schayes (27)	35–36
72	March 14	@ Boston	103–122	Dolph Schayes (25)	35–37

== Playoffs ==
1956 playoff game log
Division Tiebreaker (Finished as East's #3 seed)

Game	Date	Team	Score	High points	High rebounds	High assists	Location	Record
1	March 17	New York	W 82–77	Dolph Schayes (14)	Dolph Schayes (14)	Seymour, King (6)	Onondaga War Memorial	1–0

Division Semifinals: 2–1 (home: 1–0; road: 1–1)

Game	Date	Team	Score	High points	High rebounds	High assists	Location	Series
1	March 17	@ Boston	L 93–110	Ed Conlin (21)	—	Dolph Schayes (6)	Boston Garden	0–1
2	March 19	Boston	W 101–98	Red Kerr (23)	Red Kerr (14)	Seymour, Schayes (5)	Onondaga War Memorial	1–1
3	March 21	@ Boston	W 102–97	Dolph Schayes (27)	Dolph Schayes (17)	Dolph Schayes (5)	Boston Garden	2–1

Division Finals: 2–3 (home: 2–0; road: 0–3)

Game	Date	Team	Score	High points	High rebounds	High assists	Location	Series
1	March 23	@ Philadelphia	L 87–109	Dolph Schayes (19)	Kerr, Schayes (14)	George King (8)	Philadelphia Civic Center	0–1
2	March 25	Philadelphia	W 118–112	Dolph Schayes (33)	Dolph Schayes (16)	George King (10)	Onondaga War Memorial	1–1
3	March 27	@ Philadelphia	L 96–119	Ed Conlin (19)	Dolph Schayes (21)	George King (6)	Philadelphia Civic Center	1–2
4	March 28	Philadelphia	W 108–104	George King (25)	Red Kerr (9)	George King (15)	Onondaga War Memorial	2–2
5	March 29	@ Philadelphia	L 104–109	Dolph Schayes (28)	Dolph Schayes (16)	George King (13)	Philadelphia Civic Center	2–3

1956 schedule

== Awards and records ==
- Dolph Schayes, All-NBA Second Team
