= Sports in Boston =

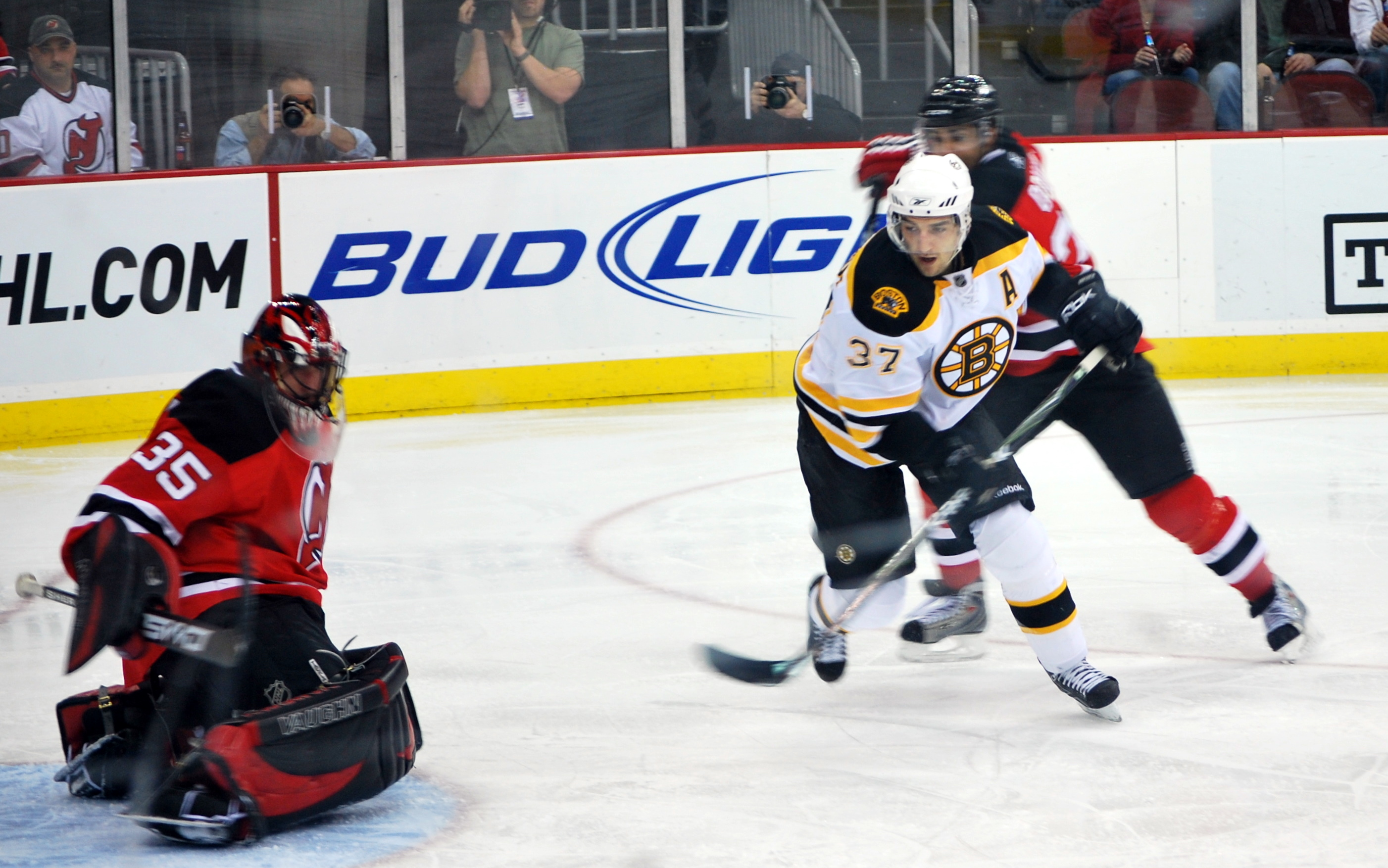
Patrice Bergeron (#37) of the Boston Bruins skates towards the net during a February 2009 game against the New Jersey Devils

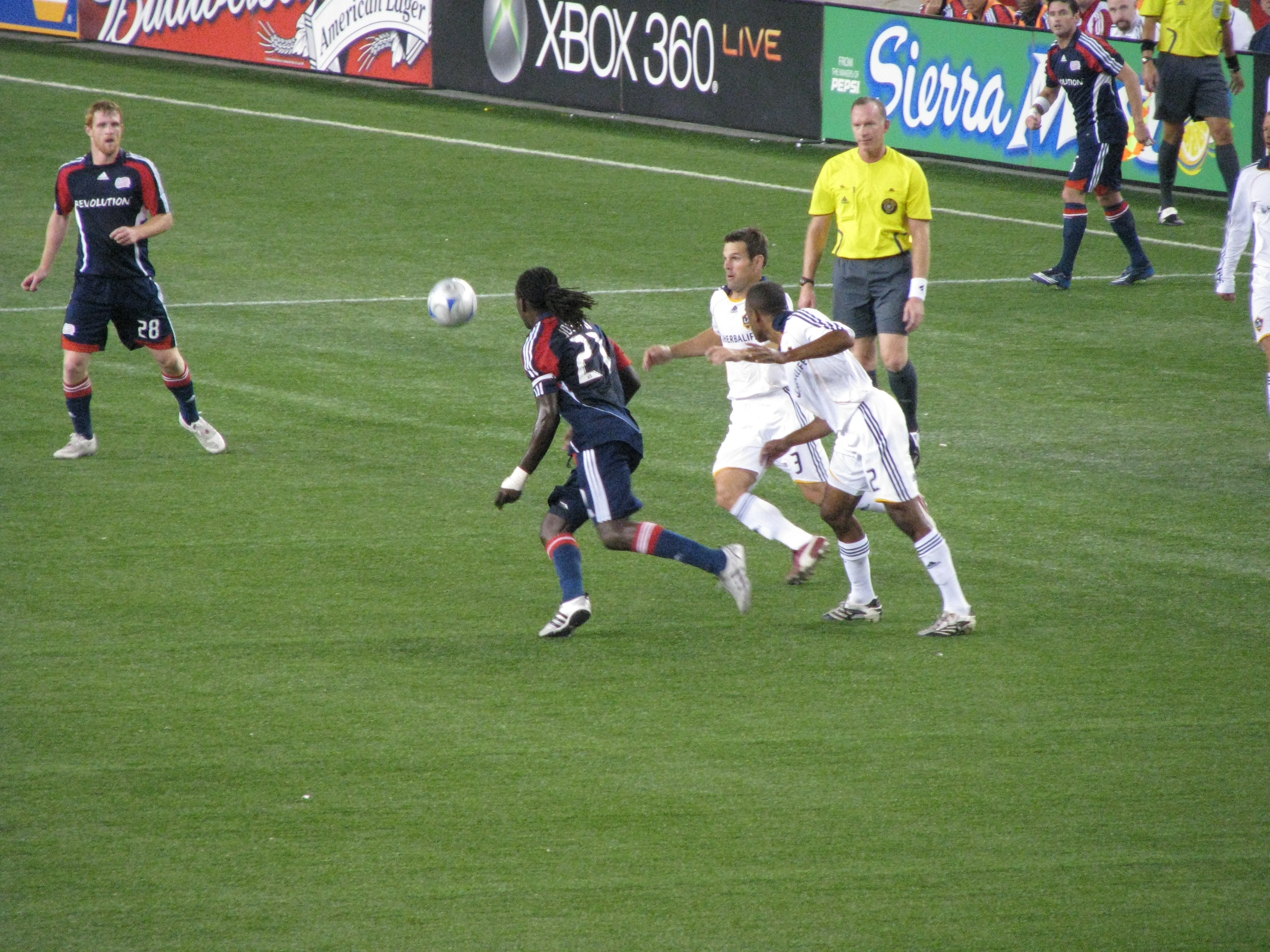
In-game action between the New England Revolution and L.A. Galaxy, 2008 at Gillette Stadium

Boston, Massachusetts, is home to several major professional sports franchises. They include the Red Sox (baseball), the Celtics (basketball, in the state where the sport was invented), and the Bruins (ice hockey). The New England Patriots (American football) and the New England Revolution (soccer) play at Gillette Stadium in the nearby suburb of Foxborough, Massachusetts. Boston is one of eleven U.S. cities to have teams from the five major professional sports leagues in the United States and Canada.

Several Boston-area colleges and universities are also active in college athletics including: Boston College, Boston University, Northeastern, and Harvard. The city is also home to prestigious sports events such as the Boston Marathon and the Head of the Charles Regatta.

Sports are a major part of the city's culture (as well as the culture of the Greater Boston area). Boston sports fans are known for their fanatical devotion to the Red Sox and knowledge of the team's history. However, in recent memory Boston is now known as an American football town, as the Patriots have long seized the title as the most popular team in New England, according to surveys. Fenway Park, home of the Red Sox, is the oldest ballpark in Major League Baseball (MLB) and holds a legendary status among baseball fans. Within the same era, what is now the world's oldest existing indoor multi-sports facility – today's Matthews Arena, primarily used by Northeastern University's college sports teams – first opened in 1910, only 1/4-mile (400m) away from the original home field of the Red Sox – and is where on December 1, 1924, the Boston Bruins played their first NHL regular season game.

The Greater Boston region is the only city/surrounding area in American professional sports in which all facilities for men's teams are privately owned and operated. The Patriots and Revolution both own Gillette Stadium, the Red Sox own Fenway Park, and TD Garden is owned by Delaware North, owner of the Bruins. The Celtics rent TD Garden from Delaware North. This is not the case for teams in the most prominent women's leagues—Boston Fleet, the region's representative in the Professional Women's Hockey League, plays at the Tsongas Center, owned by the University of Massachusetts Lowell, and the National Women's Soccer League's future Boston Legacy FC is set to start play in 2026 in White Stadium, owned by Boston's public school district.

== Major league professional teams ==
=== Current teams ===
Club	League	Sport	Venue	Founded	Championships
New England Free Jacks	MLR	Rugby Union	Veterans Memorial Stadium	2018	3 MLR titles
Boston Red Sox	MLB	Baseball	Fenway Park (37,500)	1901	9 World Series
Boston Bruins	NHL	Ice hockey	TD Garden	1924	6 Stanley Cups
Boston Celtics	NBA	Basketball	TD Garden	1946	18 NBA titles
New England Patriots	NFL	Football	Gillette Stadium	1960	6 Super Bowls
New England Revolution	MLS	Soccer	Gillette Stadium	1995	0 MLS Cups; 1 Supporters' Shield
Boston Legacy FC	NWSL	Soccer	Gillette Stadium	2023	0 NWSL Challenge Cups;
Boston Fleet	PWHL	Ice hockey	Agganis Arena	2023	0 Walter Cups;
Boston Hunters	WPBL	Baseball	Robin Roberts Stadium	2023	0

=== Former teams ===
Club	League	Sport	Venue (capacity)	Founded	Dissolved	Championships
Boston Braves	MLB	Baseball	Braves Field (40,000)	1871	1952	1 World Series
Boston Bulldogs	NFL	Football	Braves Field (40,000)	1929	1929	
Boston Redskins	NFL	Football	Fenway Park (35,000)	1932	1936	
Boston Yanks	NFL	Football	Fenway Park (35,000)	1944	1948	
Boston Rovers	NASL	Soccer	Manning Bowl (21,000)	1967	1967	
Boston Beacons	NASL	Soccer	Fenway Park (33,375)	1968	1968	
Boston Minutemen	NASL	Soccer	Alumni Stadium (30,000); Nickerson Field (15,000)	1974	1976	
New England Tea Men	NASL	Soccer	Foxboro Stadium (60,000)	1978	1980	
New England Whalers	WHA	Ice Hockey	Boston Garden (14,448)	1972	1974	1 Avco World Trophy

== Major league professional championships ==
=== Boston Red Sox (MLB) ===
9 World Series titles

- 1903
- 1912
- 1915
- 1916
- 1918
- 2004
- 2007
- 2013
- 2018

=== Boston Braves (MLB) ===
1 World Series title

- 1914

=== New England Patriots (NFL) ===
6 Super Bowl titles

- 2001 (XXXVI)
- 2003 (XXXVIII)
- 2004 (XXXIX)
- 2014 (XLIX)
- 2016 (LI)
- 2018 (LIII)

=== Boston Celtics (NBA) ===
18 NBA Finals titles

- 1957
- 1959
- 1960
- 1961
- 1962
- 1963
- 1964
- 1965
- 1966
- 1968
- 1969
- 1974
- 1976
- 1981
- 1984
- 1986
- 2008
- 2024

=== Boston Bruins (NHL) ===
6 Stanley Cup titles

- 1929
- 1939
- 1941
- 1970
- 1972
- 2011

=== New England Whalers (WHA) ===
1 Avco World Trophy

- 1973

== 21st century success ==
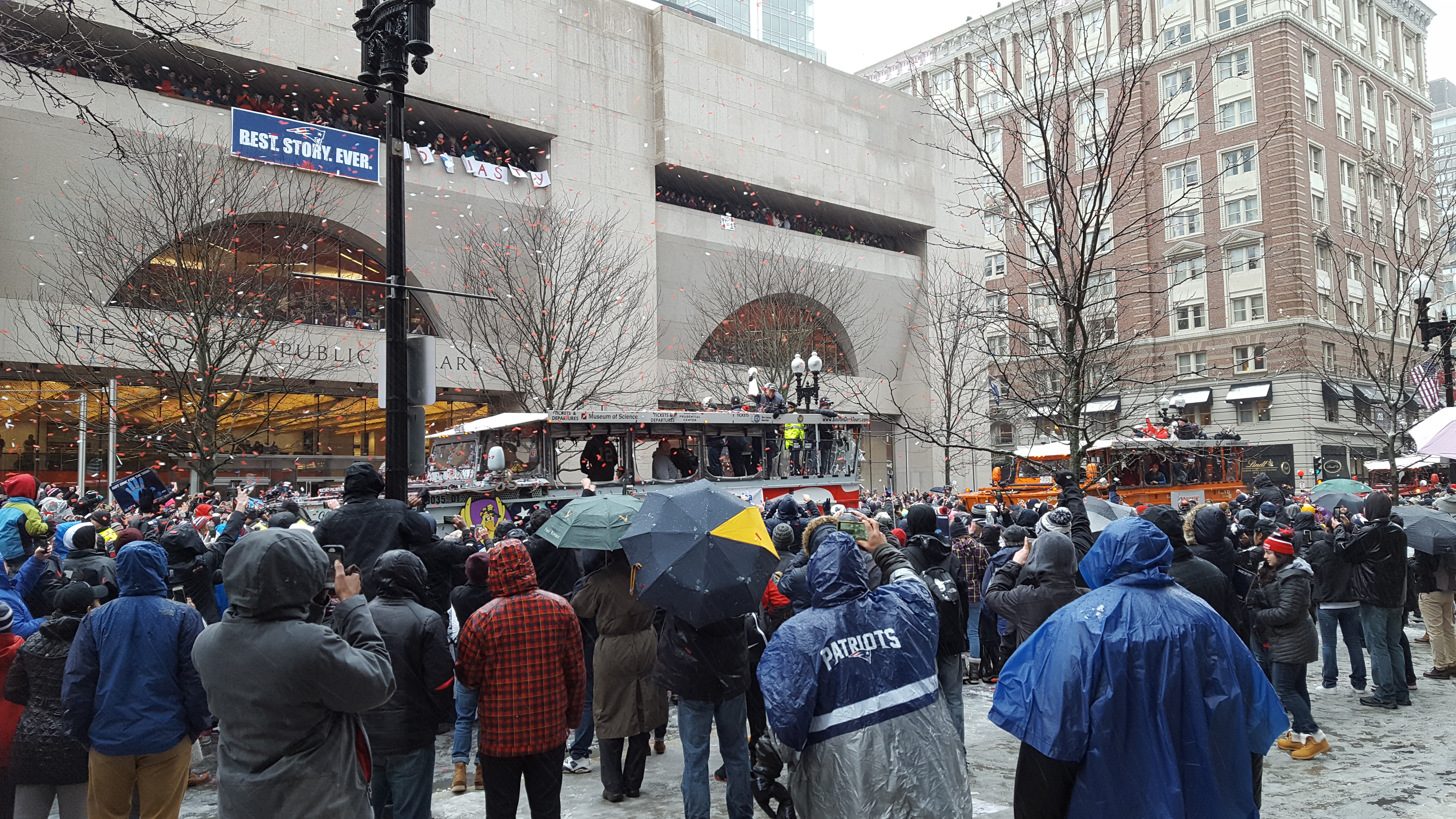
New England Patriots parade following their victory in Super Bowl LI

Since the turn of the century, Boston's professional sports teams have won 13 championships: six by the Patriots (Super Bowls XXXVI (2001), XXXVIII (2003), XXXIX (2004), XLIX (2014), LI (2016), and LIII (2018)), four by the Red Sox (2004, 2007, 2013, and 2018), two by the Celtics (2008 and 2024), and one by the Bruins (2011). Their sports teams have also appeared an additional 12 times as league finalists: five by the Revolution (2002, 2005, 2006, 2007, and 2014), four by the Patriots (Super Bowls XLII (2007), XLVI (2011), LII (2017), and LX (2026)), two by the Bruins (2013, and 2019) and two by the Celtics (2010 and 2022). The recent sporting success of their teams has given rise to the city's moniker as the "City of Champions", and "Titletown".

In the 2000s, Boston's professional teams had what was argued to be the most successful decade in sports history, winning six championships (three by the Patriots: 2001, 2003, 2004; two by the Red Sox: 2004, 2007; and one by the Celtics: 2007–08), while also appearing an additional five times as league finalists (4x by the Revolution, 1x by the Patriots). Additionally, their teams have completed their regular seasons with the best record five times in their respective leagues (3x by the Patriots: 14–2 in 2003, 14–2 in 2004, 16–0 in 2007; 2x by the Celtics: 66–16 in 2007–08, 62–20 in 2008–09).

In the 2010s, their professional teams rivaled their 2000s achievements, winning six additional championships (three by the Patriots: 2014, 2016, 2018; two by the Red Sox: 2013, 2018; and one by the Bruins: 2010–11), while also appearing an additional six times as league finalists (2x by the Patriots, 2x by the Bruins, 1x by the Celtics, and 1x by the Revolution). Additionally, their teams have completed their regular seasons with the best record four times in their respective leagues (2x by the Patriots: 14–2 in 2010, 14–2 in 2016; one Presidents' Trophy by the Bruins: 117 PTS in 2013–14; 1x by the Red Sox: 108–54 in 2018).

In the 2020s, the Celtics won a championship in 2024, while also appearing an additional time as a league finalist in 2022. Additionally, Boston's professional teams have completed their regular seasons with the best record four times in their respective leagues (two presidents' Trophies by the Bruins: 100 PTS in 2019–20, 135 PTS in 2022–23; one Supporters' Shield by the Revolution: 22–5–7 in 2021; 1x by the Celtics: 64–18 in 2023–24).

When the Bruins won the 2011 Stanley Cup Finals, the city of Boston became the first city in the 21st century to have at least four of its major professional league teams win a league championship, and became the first city to have championships in four major professional leagues within a ten-year span, accomplishing this feat in a span of six years, four months, and nine days (from the Patriots' championship win on February 6, 2005, to the Bruins' championship win on June 15, 2011). Los Angeles would accomplish this same feat in 2022. The New York metropolitan area would also have championships in each of the four sports, accomplishing that in 2026, albeit over a span of 23 years. This sporting achievement was what Dan Shaughnessy of Sports Illustrated dubbed as Boston completing the "Grand Slam of North American sports." From 2010-2024, at least one of Boston's five major pro sports teams has played in the final four of their respective sports playoffs, MLB's ALCS, NFL's AFC Championship Game, or the Eastern Conference Finals in the NBA, NHL, and MLS in every year. Since 2002, duck boats provided by Boston Duck Tours have been used as Boston's championship parade vehicles, starting with the New England Patriots after the Patriots won Super Bowl XXXVI over the St. Louis Rams. As a result of this recent practice, the catch phrase "cue the duck boats" has been used whenever a Boston sports team has won a championship in advance of its celebratory parade. While much of the parade routes over the years consisted of the duck boats staying on land, some featured them traversing both the land and across the Charles River.

== Soccer ==
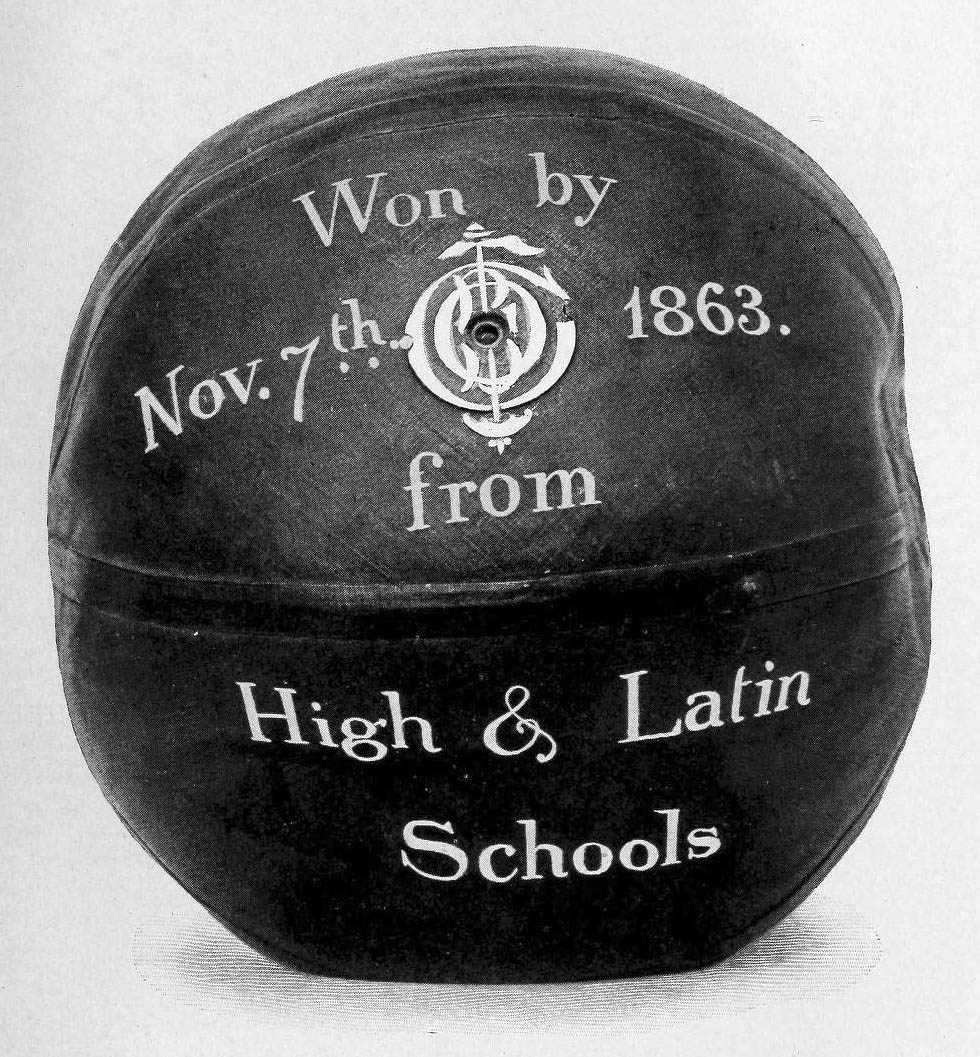
A ball used by Oneida Football Club in 1863 was box-shaped with rounded corners

According to American folklore, Pilgrim fathers observed a form of soccer called pasuckuakohowog that was played by Native Americans along the Massachusetts coast as early as 1620, the earliest observance of soccer of any form in what is currently the United States.

In 1862, The Oneida Football Club in Boston was the first organized team to play any kind of "football/soccer" in the United States. It was founded by Gerrit Smith "Gat" Miller, a graduate of the Latin School of Epes Sargent Dixwell, a private college preparatory school in Boston, who grew tired of the chaotic, disorganized, and very violent games that arose from different schools, as well as the rule variations of soccer that existed as a by-product of no formal rules for the game during that era. Miller organized other recent preparatory school graduates from relatively elite public (state) schools in the area, such as Boston Latin School and the English High School of Boston to join this team that played their games at Boston Common. Between 1862 and 1865, playing against other pickup teams within Boston's collegiate community, the Oneidas never lost a match. Like American football historians, soccer historians trace the origins of their sport in the region to the Oneida Football Club and their brand of football that they played called the "Boston Game", which was a hybrid of both sports today that featured a rounded ball that could be kicked, carried, and thrown. The Boston game would go on to be introduced to Yale University, Columbia University, Cornell University, and Boston's Harvard University. This hybrid form of football, that would evolve into what is now American football, would eventually adopt codified rules based primarily on those established for English rugby, gained prominence and acceptance within the college circles, and upper-class status, relegating the uncodified "soccer" variety of the game to working-class status, that was adopted by the immigrant communities that brought along their soccer customs and traditions with them to the region.

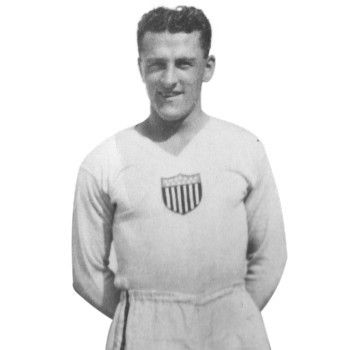
Bert Patenaude, a native of Fall River, Massachusetts, scored the first hat-trick in FIFA World Cup history in 1930 for the United States

In 1923, the world's first indoor soccer league with 11-a-side teams on a full-sized field opened the winter season at the Commonwealth Cavalry Armory in Boston.

In 1924, the Boston Soccer Club was formed and played in the professional American Soccer League, which comprised teams based in the northeastern U.S. region. The team was later renamed the Boston Bears in 1929 and played for an additional few seasons before the league folded in 1933 due to the Great Depression in the United States.

Bert Patenaude and Billy Gonsalves, both inductees of the National Soccer Hall of Fame and natives of Fall River, Massachusetts, played for the U.S. men's national team at the inaugural FIFA World Cup in 1930 (hosted in Uruguay). Patenaude scored the first hat-trick in World Cup history. The USMNT finished in third place.

1967 brought about the birth of nationwide professional soccer featuring two competing leagues. Of the two, Boston only played in the United Soccer Association and was represented by the Boston Rovers, whose roster was composed of players from Shamrock Rovers F.C. from the League of Ireland as well as guest players. They played their home matches at the Manning Bowl in Lynn, Massachusetts. In 1968, the United Soccer Association and the National Professional Soccer League merged to become the FIFA-backed, major professional North American Soccer League (NASL). Boston was represented that year by the Boston Beacons who played their lone season at Fenway Park. In 1974–76, Boston was represented in the league by the Boston Minutemen who played their home games in various stadiums within Greater Boston, including Nickerson Field and Foxboro Stadium. From 1978 to 1980, Greater Boston was represented in the league by the New England Tea Men who played out of Foxboro Stadium. The team would relocate to Jacksonville, Florida after three seasons.

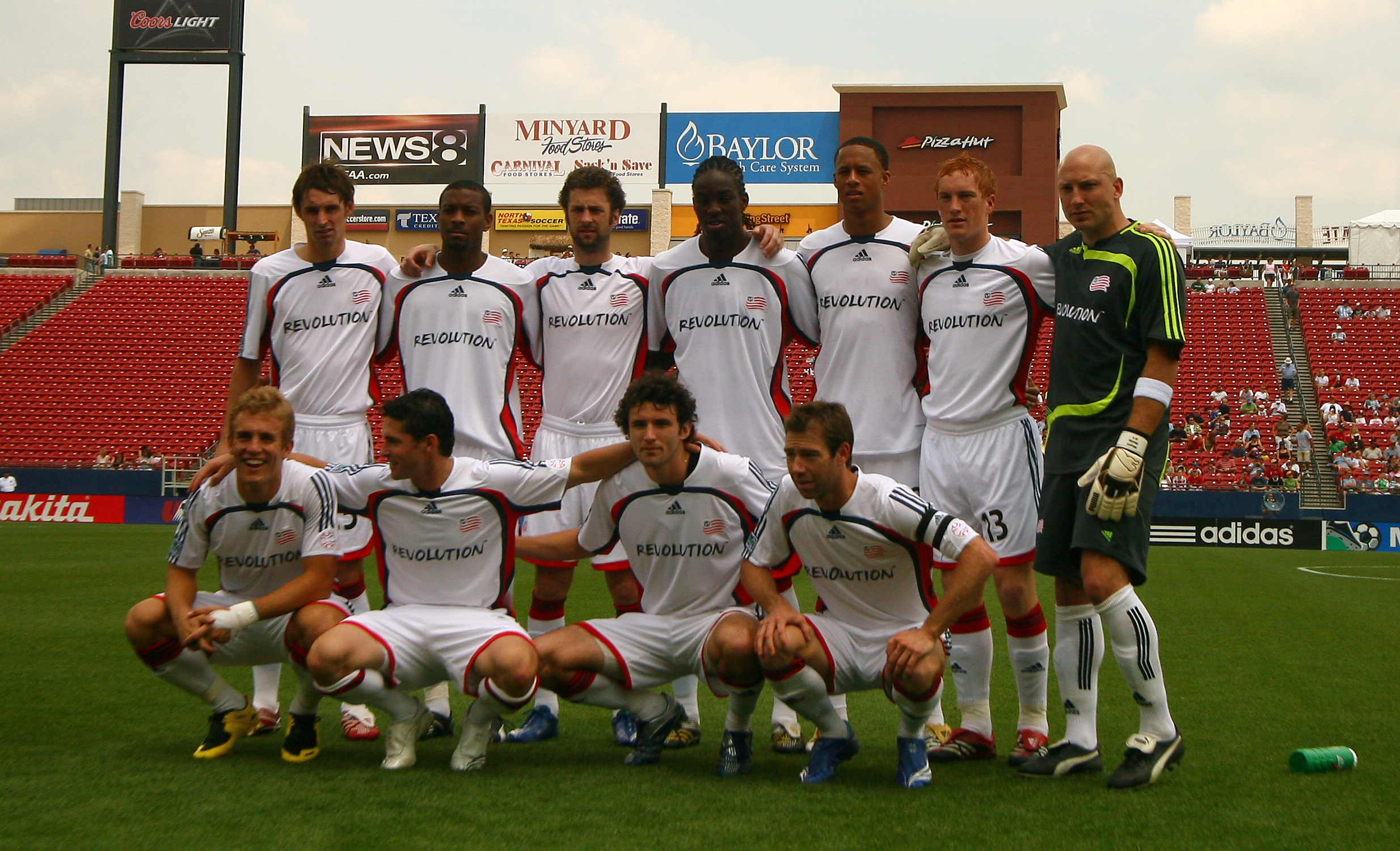
New England Revolution club photo in 2007

After the NASL folded on March 28, 1985, a new nationwide professional soccer league would re-emerge in 1996 in the form of Major League Soccer (MLS) following the success of the 1994 FIFA World Cup (with Foxboro Stadium as one of nine venues). Greater Boston would be represented by the New England Revolution, who play all their home games in Foxborough, Massachusetts. Gillette Stadium has served as the Revolution's current home stadium since 2002. The club's nickname "Revolution" refers to the New England region's significant involvement in the American Revolutionary War that took place from 1775 to 1783. The Revolution have participated in five MLS Cup finals in 2002, 2005, 2006, 2007, and 2014, but have not yet won. They won the 2021 MLS Supporters' Shield for the best regular season record.

Notable footballers who played in Boston include Portuguese legend Eusébio, and U.S. national team members: Taylor Twellman, Clint Dempsey, Alexi Lalas, and Billy Gonsalves.

== Basketball ==
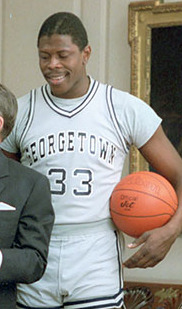
Basketball Hall of Famer Patrick Ewing grew up in Cambridge, Massachusetts and attended the Cambridge Rindge and Latin School

The Boston Celtics basketball team, who play at the TD Garden, were a founding member of the Basketball Association of America, one of the two leagues that merged to form the National Basketball Association (NBA). The Celtics have the distinction of having more championships than any other NBA team, with eighteen championships from 1957 to 2024. They had a remarkable run of titles from the 1956–57 until the 1968–69 seasons, winning 11 of 13 championships in that span, including an NBA record 8 titles in a row from 1958 to 1959 until 1965–66, under legendary center Bill Russell.

The list of Celtics who are members of the Basketball Hall of Fame include, among others, Bill Russell, Bob Cousy, John Havlicek, Dave Cowens, Larry Bird, Sam Jones, Nate Archibald, original owner Walter Brown, and longtime coach and team president Red Auerbach, who worked for the team until his death in 2006 at age 89. Longtime announcer Johnny Most was also honored by the Basketball Hall of Fame as a recipient of the Curt Gowdy Media Award. After finishing with a record of 24–58 in 2006–07, the team acquired Ray Allen and Kevin Garnett from the Seattle SuperSonics and Minnesota Timberwolves, respectively, to aid longtime Celtics star Paul Pierce make up one of the best defensive and offensive lineups in NBA history. With help of up-and-coming Rajon Rondo, Kendrick Perkins, and head coach Doc Rivers the team once again made history by winning the 2008 NBA Finals and their 17th championship against long-time rivals the Lakers.

One of the most notable athletes from Greater Boston was Hall of Famer Patrick Ewing who grew up in Cambridge, Massachusetts and attended the Cambridge Rindge and Latin School. Ewing won Olympic gold medals as a member of the 1984 and 1992 U.S. men's basketball teams and was selected as one of the 50 Greatest Players in NBA History in 1996 and as one of the 75 Greatest Players in NBA History in 2021.

== Ice hockey ==
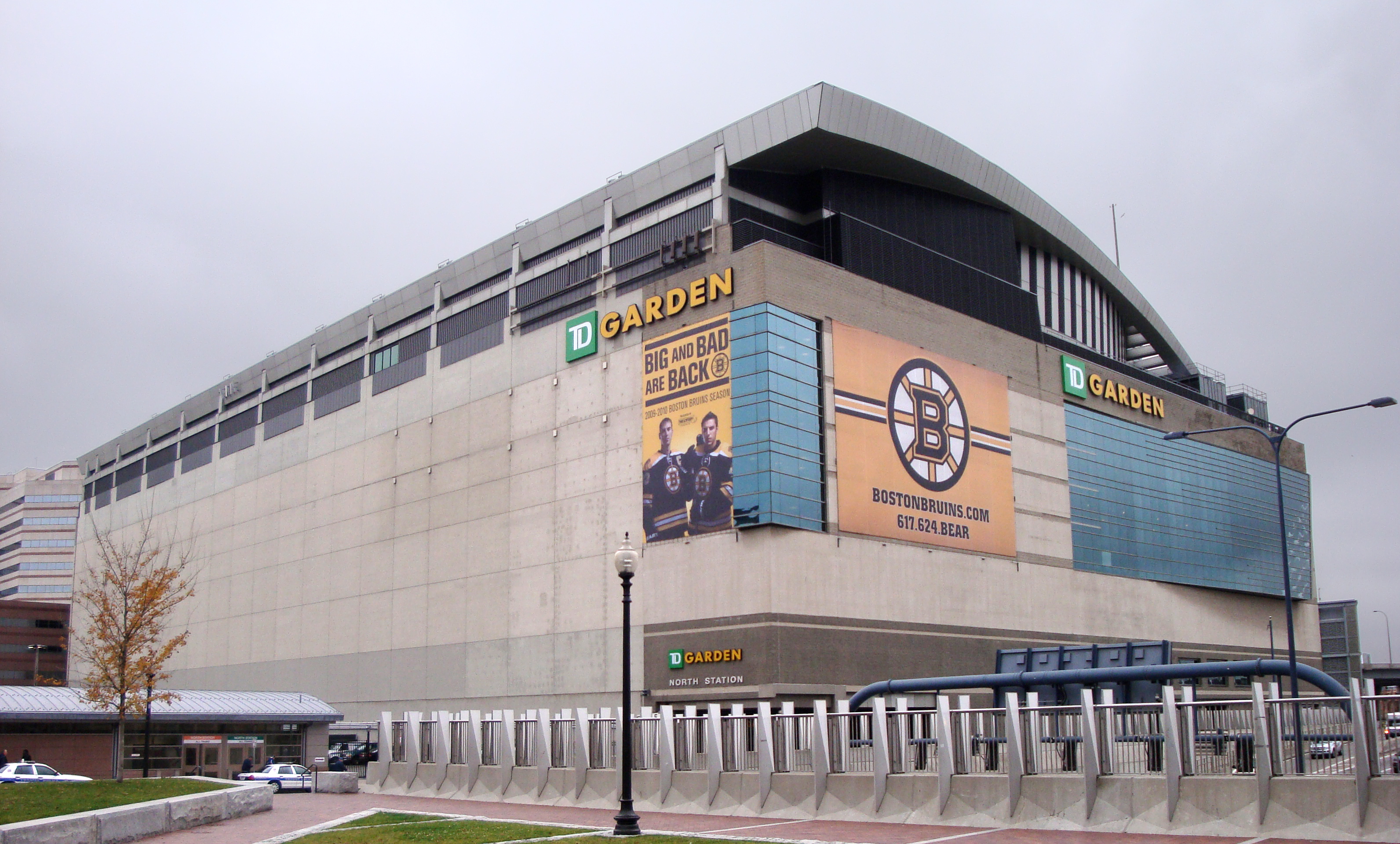
The TD Garden is the home venue for NHL's Bruins and NBA's Celtics

The TD Garden, above North Station, is the home to the Boston Bruins ice hockey team of the National Hockey League (NHL). The Bruins, founded in 1924, were the first American member of the NHL and an Original Six franchise, and have won six Stanley Cups, most recently in 2011, when they defeated the Vancouver Canucks in seven games. The Bruins' first venue—the team is the only one of the Original Six teams to have its original venue still in existence—was the former Boston Arena on Huntington Avenue, having been built in 1910 under that name, which now exists as Northeastern University's Matthews Arena. It is the oldest purpose-built indoor ice hockey arena still in use in the world for the sport, used for Northeastern Huskies collegiate ice hockey and basketball in the 21st century.

Hall of Fame players such as forward Milt Schmidt, and defensemen Eddie Shore, Raymond Bourque and the legendary Bobby Orr have played for the Bruins, as well as the NHL's tallest-ever player, Slovak-born defenseman Zdeno Chára, a former captain of the Bruins. The team has been managed and coached by Hall of Famers such as team founder Charles Adams (namesake of hockey's old Adams Division), Art Ross (donor and namesake of the NHL's trophy for annual scoring champion), Walter A. Brown, Schmidt, and Harry Sinden. Orr was voted the greatest athlete in Boston history in the Boston Globe newspaper's poll of New Englanders in 1975, beating out baseball and basketball stars such as Ted Williams, Bill Russell, Carl Yastrzemski, and Bob Cousy.

Since their initial meeting on December 8, 1924, the longest-standing rivalry in the NHL is the one between the Bruins and their Canadian archrival, the Montreal Canadiens. These two teams have met 34 times in the NHL's Stanley Cup playoffs, with Montreal taking 18-straight playoff series from the Bruins between 1946 and 1987.

Boston's local colleges are also very strong in hockey. Boston College and Boston University are always competitive and at the top of the college rankings, both competing in the Hockey East conference. Since 2001, Boston College has won four national championships (2001, 2008, 2010, and 2012) and Boston University has won one (2009). BC and BU, along with the Northeastern Huskies, also of Hockey East, and the Harvard Crimson of ECAC Hockey, compete in the Beanpot, considered the most prestigious in-season collegiate hockey tournament. It is played on the first two Mondays of February at TD Garden, with the semi-final matchups rotating on a year-to-year basis. Although neither the BC or BU women's teams have secured national championships, they have together eight Hockey East titles since 2010.

Boston also has a rich recent history in professional women's hockey. The Boston Pride were a charter franchise of the National Women's Hockey League (NWHL) and its most successful team, winning three Isobel Cup titles. The NWHL, which rebranded as the Premier Hockey Federation in 2021, was purchased and ultimately dissolved in 2023 as part of an effort to create a new, unified North American women's professional league. Boston was awarded one of the new Professional Women's Hockey League (PWHL) six charter franchises. Boston Fleet hosts games in Lowell and at Aggannis Arena in Boston, and debuted on January 3, 2024. In the inaugural season, Boston Fleet made it to the finals competing for the Walter Cup, but lost to Minnesota Frost in Game 5. In their third season, they sold out the TD Garden for their April 11, 2026 game.

== Baseball ==
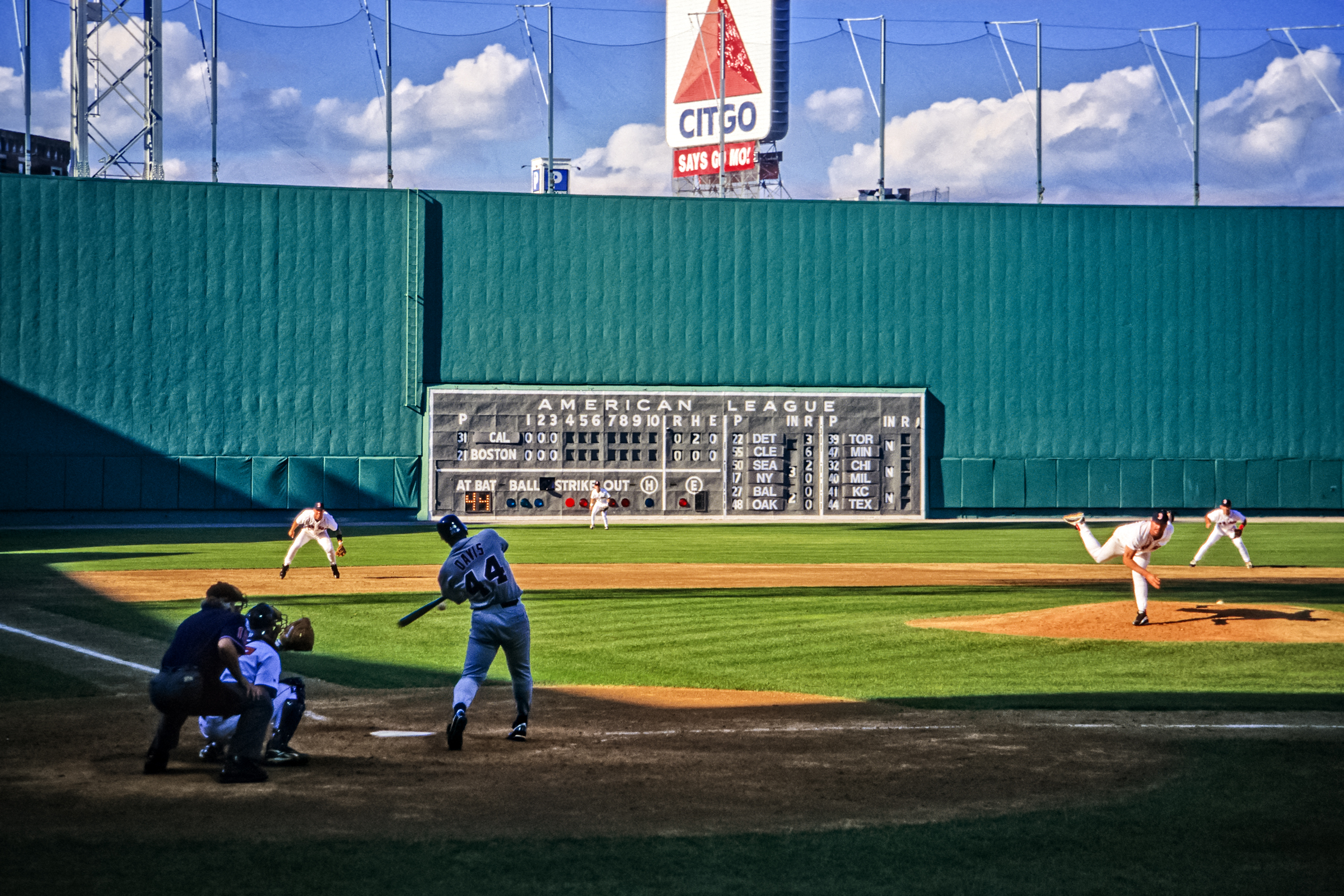
A baseball game at Fenway Park, August 1996

The Boston Red Sox are a founding member of the American League (AL) of Major League Baseball (MLB), and one of the four American League teams (the White Sox, Guardians, and Tigers are the others) to still play in their original city. The "BoSox", or "Sox" as they are colloquially called, play their home games at Fenway Park, located near Kenmore Square, in the Fenway section of Boston. Built in 1912, it is the oldest sports arena or stadium in active use in the United States among the four major professional sports. Boston was also the site of the first game of the first baseball World Series, in 1903. The Boston-New York baseball rivalry has existed since May 7, 1903: the Red Sox–Yankees rivalry, with the New York team then being known as the "Highlanders", from their Upper Manhattan home field location. The 1903 World Series was played between the Red Sox (then known as the "Americans") and the Pittsburgh Pirates, while the team still played at the Huntington Avenue Grounds (the site is now a part of Northeastern University). The Sox won that series and eight more since then (1912, 1915, 1916, 1918, 2004, 2007, 2013, and 2018). The 2004 team is said to have broken the 86-year-long "Curse of the Bambino." There have been many legendary players on the team including Cy Young, Babe Ruth, Ted Williams, Carl Yastrzemski, Carlton Fisk, Wade Boggs, Jim Rice, Pedro Martínez, Roger Clemens, and David Ortiz.

For the first half of the 20th century, Boston had two Major League Baseball franchises. The Boston Braves, operated in the National League (NL) from 1871 to 1952 before relocating to Milwaukee, and finally moving to their current home, Atlanta. They played their home games at South End Grounds (1871–1914) and Braves Field (1915–1952). In 1914, the Braves performed one of the most memorable comebacks in major league history, going from last place to first place in two months, becoming the first team to win a pennant after being in last place on the Fourth of July. The Braves went on to sweep Connie Mack's heavily favored Athletics in four games in the 1914 World Series. The franchise is the oldest continuous professional sports franchise.

The city is also home to Boston Hunters of the Women's Professional Baseball League.

== American football ==
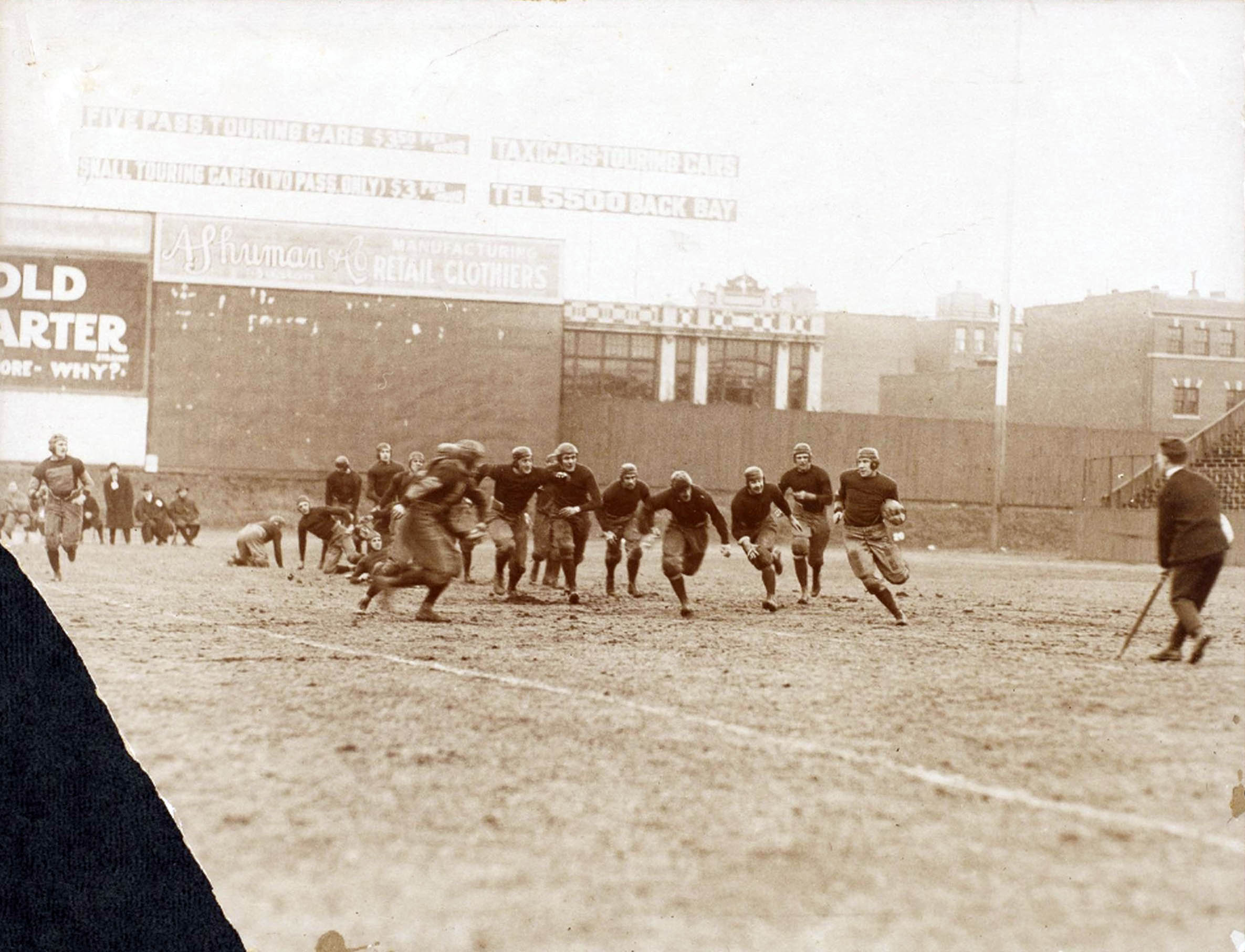
Holy Cross plays Boston College at Fenway Park in 1916

=== The Boston game ===
The Boston Game is thought to be the origin of American football, played by New England prep schools. In 1855, manufactured inflatable balls were introduced. These were much more regular in shape than the handmade balls of earlier times, making kicking and carrying more skillful. Two competing versions had evolved during this time; the "kicking game" which resembled soccer and the "running" or "carrying game" which resembled rugby union. hybrid of the two, known as the "Boston game", was played by a group known as the Oneida Football Club. The club, considered by some historians as the first formal football club in the United States, was formed in 1861 by schoolboys who played the "Boston game" on Boston Common. They played mostly among themselves early on; though they organized a team of non-members to play a game in November 1863, which the Oneidas won easily. The game caught the attention of the press, and the "Boston game" continued to grow throughout the 1860s.

=== Early professional football ===
The first professional National Football League (NFL) franchise in the city was the Boston Bulldogs, who only played a single season (in 1929) since relocating from Pottsville, Pennsylvania.

The Boston Braves were established in 1932, under the ownership of George Preston Marshall. At the time the team played in Braves Field, home of the Boston Braves baseball team in the National League. The following year, the club moved to Fenway Park, home of the American League's Boston Red Sox, whereupon owners changed the team's name to "Boston Redskins." To round out the change, Marshall hired William "Lone Star" Dietz, who was thought to be part Sioux, as the team's head coach. However, Boston wasn't much of a football town at the time and the team had difficulty drawing fans. In fact, the 1936 NFL Championship Game was moved to the Polo Grounds in New York City due to apathy and low support in Boston. In 1937, Marshall moved the franchise to Washington, D.C.

In 1944, the Boston Yanks were established (the 3rd NFL franchise in Boston's history), playing their home games at Fenway Park and competing until 1948. The Yanks are the only officially defunct NFL team ever to have the first overall NFL draft pick. They had it twice, in 1944 and 1946. Both times they selected a quarterback from the University of Notre Dame: Angelo Bertelli (1944) and Frank Dancewicz (1946), both Massachusetts natives. Owner Ted Collins moved his "defunct" Yanks franchise to New York City in 1949, where it continued for one year as the Bulldogs and two years known as the New York Yanks.

=== Modern professional football ===
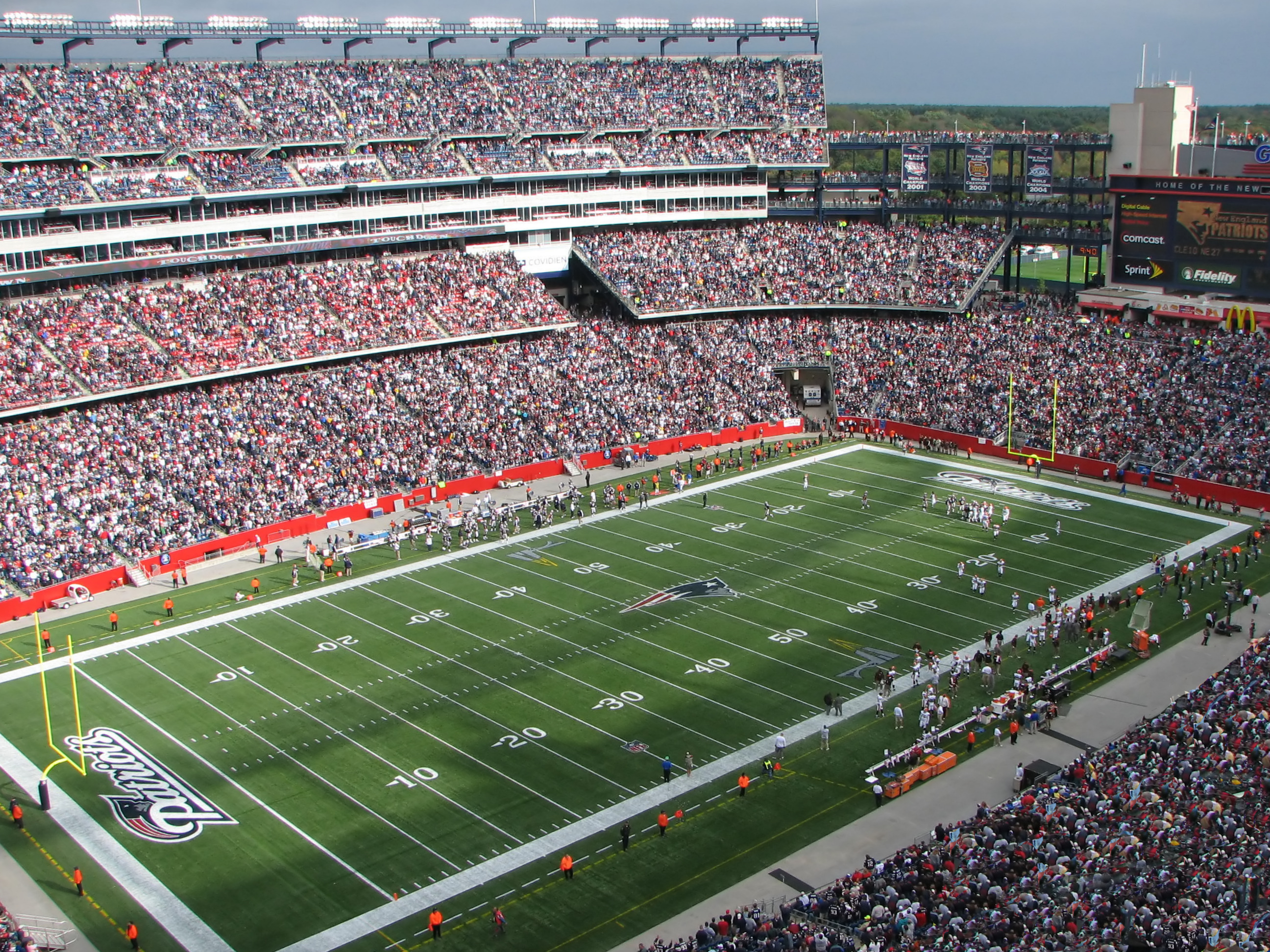
Gillette Stadium is the home stadium of the NFL's New England Patriots

In 1959, Boston businessman Billy Sullivan was awarded a franchise in the American Football League (AFL), the Boston Patriots, bringing professional football back to Boston. Throughout the 1960s, the team lacked a permanent home field, playing at Boston University Field (at the time still known and configured as Braves Field), Fenway Park, Harvard Stadium, and Boston College's Alumni Stadium. In 1970, the AFL merged with the NFL and the Patriots joined the league (the AFL- NFL merger was announced in 1966, the first season of Super Bowl competition). The following year, the franchise was re-named the New England Patriots. From 1971 to 2002, the team played at Foxboro Stadium in the town of Foxborough, Massachusetts which is located 22 miles (45 km) southwest of downtown Boston. Unlike most major American cities, Boston was slow to get a professional-caliber stadium, which stymied past attempts at top-tier football in the city prior to the Patriots' arrival. Largely due to the stadium issue, the Patriots are the only football team in the Boston area's sporting history to survive more than five years. The 2002 season brought the opening of Gillette Stadium, located next door to Foxboro Stadium.

Businessman Robert Kraft, who at the time owned Foxboro Stadium and the team's lease for it, purchased the team in 1994 for $175 million, ensuring the Patriots would remain in New England amid a shuffle of owners and rumors of a relocation to St. Louis. The team experienced a recent surge of success, mostly with the turn of the century. The team has made 12 Super Bowl appearances and won six of them – XXXVI (2001), XXXVIII (2003), XXXIX (2004), XLIX (2014), LI (2016), and LIII (2018) – and became the only team to go 16–0 in the regular season (in 2007) since the NFL expanded to a 16-game schedule in 1978. Notable people among the team include head coach Bill Belichick and star quarterback Tom Brady, who among others would help make the Patriots consistently successful. The Patriots won 21 games in a row from 2003 to 2004, including winning Super Bowl XXXVIII.

The only substantive challenge to the Patriots came from the United States Football League's Boston Breakers, who played at Nickerson Field in the upstart spring league's inaugural season. However, by the end of that season, it was clear that Nickerson Field was too small and too outdated even for temporary use. Unable to find a more suitable venue, the Breakers moved to New Orleans the following season.

== Rugby union ==
Rugby in Boston has a strong following; the city is home to numerous amateur, college and semi-professional sides. The city has three teams in the former premier division of USA rugby union, the Rugby Super League – Mystic River Rugby Club, the Boston Irish Wolfhounds, and Boston RFC. The current top flight of the sport, Major League Rugby, has the Boston-based New England Free Jacks who joined the league in 2020. The team has won three consecutive MLR shields and becoming the first team earned the most titles in franchise history.

== Rugby league ==
The Boston 13s (now known as the Bears) founded in 2009, play in the North Conference of the USA Rugby League, they won the USARL National Championship in 2015.

== Other sports teams ==
Club	League	Gender	Sport	Venue	Established	Disbanded	Championships
Boston Lobsters	WTT	Mixed	Tennis	Ferncroft Country Club	2005	2015	None
Boston Demons	USAFL	Men's	Australian rules football	Ipswich River Park	1997		USAFL Premierships (Div. 1): 1998, 1999
Boston Cannons	PLL	Men's	Lacrosse (Outdoor)	Gillette Stadium	2001		2 Steinfeld Cups (2011, 2020)
Boston Breakers	NWSL	Women's	Soccer	Jordan Field	2001/2009	2018	None
Boston Aztec	WPSL	Women's	Soccer	Amesbury Sports Park	2005	2017	1 WPSL Title
Boston Massacre Boston Derby Dames	WFTDA	Women's	Flat track roller derby	Amesbury Sports Park	2005		None
Boston Whitecaps	MLU	Men's	Ultimate Frisbee	Bowditch Field	2012	2016	2 MLU Championships
Boston Pride	PHF	Women's	Ice hockey	Warrior Ice Arena	2015	2023	3 Isobel Cups (2016, 2021, 2022)
Boston Renegades	WFA	Women's	American Football	Harry Della Russo Stadium; Revere, Massachusetts	2015	2025 (on hiatus)	1 IWFL title (2010) 7 WFA titles (2011, 2014, 2018, 2019, 2021, 2022, 2023)
Boston Storm	UWLX	Women's	Lacrosse	"Barnstorming" format	2016	2018	None
Boston Guard	WLL	Women's	Lacrosse	Harvard Stadium	2025		1 WLL Title (2025)
Boston Uprising	OWL	Mixed	Overwatch	Citizens Bank Opera House	2017	2023	None
M80 Boston	CDL	Mixed	Call of Duty	MGM Music Hall at Fenway	2021		
Boston Glory	UFA	Men's	Ultimate (sport)	Hormel Stadium	2019		1 UFA title (2025)
Boston Forge	MLQ	Mixed	Quadball		2015		3 MLQ titles (2015, 2016, 2019)
Massachusetts Pirates	IFL	Men's	Indoor American football	Tsongas Center	2017	2025	1 IFL title (2021)
Boston Ball Hogs	BIG3	Men's	Basketball	TD Garden	2017		1 BIG3 title (2026)
Boston Common Golf	TGL	Men's	Golf	Sofi Center	2025		
Boston Banshees	WER	Women's	Rugby Union	Veterans Memorial Stadium	2025		

Boston is home to three professional lacrosse teams, including the Boston Cannons of Major League Lacrosse, who played at Harvard University's Harvard Stadium. The National Lacrosse League team in Boston is the Boston Blazers, who began in the 2009 season and played at the TD Garden. The Boston Storm, who began in the 2016 season, were one of the original four teams of the United Women's Lacrosse League.

Two different women's soccer teams known as the Boston Breakers have been charter members of three separate professional leagues. The original version, founded in 2001, played in the short-lived Women's United Soccer Association. The Breakers were resurrected in 2009 to play in WUSA's equally short-lived successor, Women's Professional Soccer (WPS). After WPS folded following its 2011 season, the Breakers remained in operation, playing the 2012 season in the newly established semi-pro WPSL Elite. In December 2012, the Breakers were announced as one of the eight charter teams of the new National Women's Soccer League, which began play in 2013. While the WUSA and WPS Breakers played at Harvard Stadium, the NWSL team played its first season at the smaller Dilboy Stadium in Somerville. The NWSL Breakers moved to Harvard Stadium for the 2014 season, and then moved to the nearby venue now known as Jordan Field, where they remained until their demise after the 2017 season.

In September 2023, the NWSL announced that a Boston team would start play in 2026. The team announced its branding as BOS Nation FC in October 2024. Due to fan backlash, the team announced it would change its name to Boston Legacy FC on March 26, 2025.

There have been other professional sports teams to play in the city, such as the Boston Beacons and Boston Minutemen of the NASL. Boston's first all-female flat-track roller derby league, Boston Derby Dames, formed in May 2005. The league is among the original members of the Women's Flat Track Derby Association.

== College sports ==
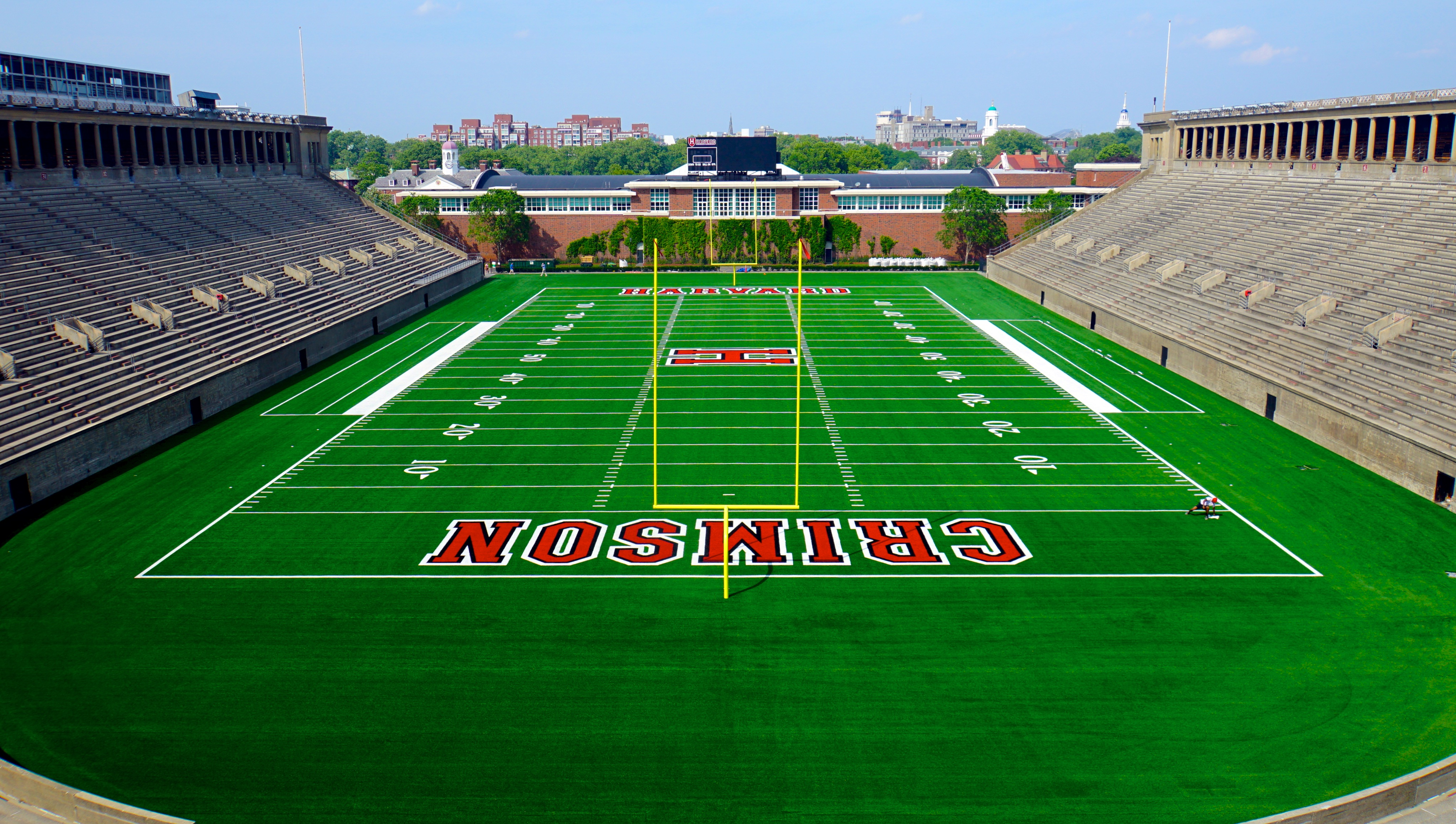
Harvard Stadium

Boston's many colleges and universities are active in college athletics. There are four NCAA Division I members in the city: Boston College (member of the Atlantic Coast Conference), Boston University (Patriot League), Northeastern University (Coastal Athletic Association), and Harvard University (Ivy League).

All except Harvard, which belongs to ECAC Hockey, belong to the Hockey East conference in hockey. The hockey teams of these four universities meet every year in a four-team tournament known as the "Beanpot Tournament", played at the TD Garden (and the Boston Garden before that) over two Monday nights in February.

The oldest continuously used indoor and outdoor sports stadiums in the world are used by Boston schools: Harvard Stadium (built in 1903) and the aforementioned Boston Arena (now known as Matthews Arena, built in 1910), which is used by Northeastern University.

== Amateur and participatory sports ==
Boston has amateur and participatory sports and recreation. The 18-mile loop through the Paul Dudley White Bicycle Path runs on both sides of the river within the Charles River Reservation for bicyclists and runners. Boston is also home is the oldest continuously operating community sailing program in the United States. It is located in Boston along the Charles River Esplanade between the Longfellow Bridge and the Hatch Shell. Community Boating, Inc offers members instruction for sailing and windsurfing, and allows members to use CBI-owned sailboats on the Charles River. The Boston Ski and Sports Club offers team sports leagues in Basketball, Ultimate, Dodgeball, Football, Tennis, Volleyball, Golf, and other indoor and outdoor sports.

== Events ==
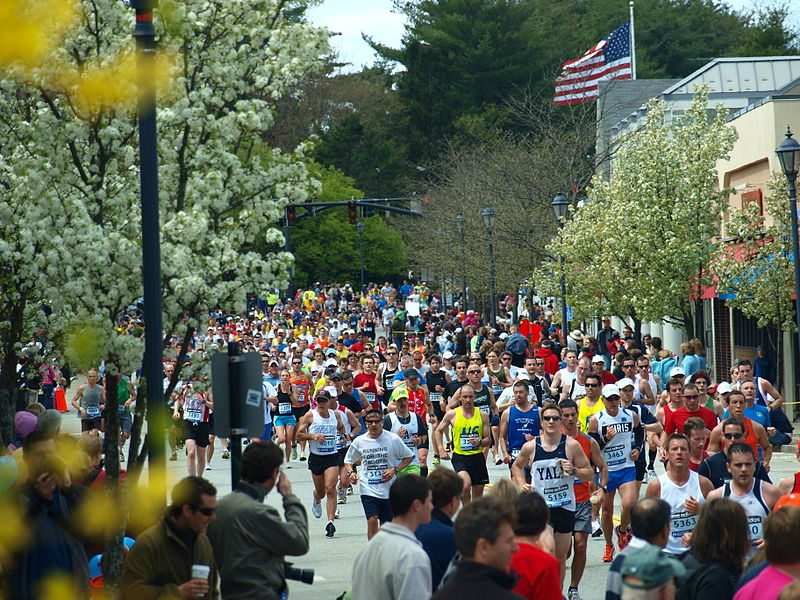
2010 Boston Marathon

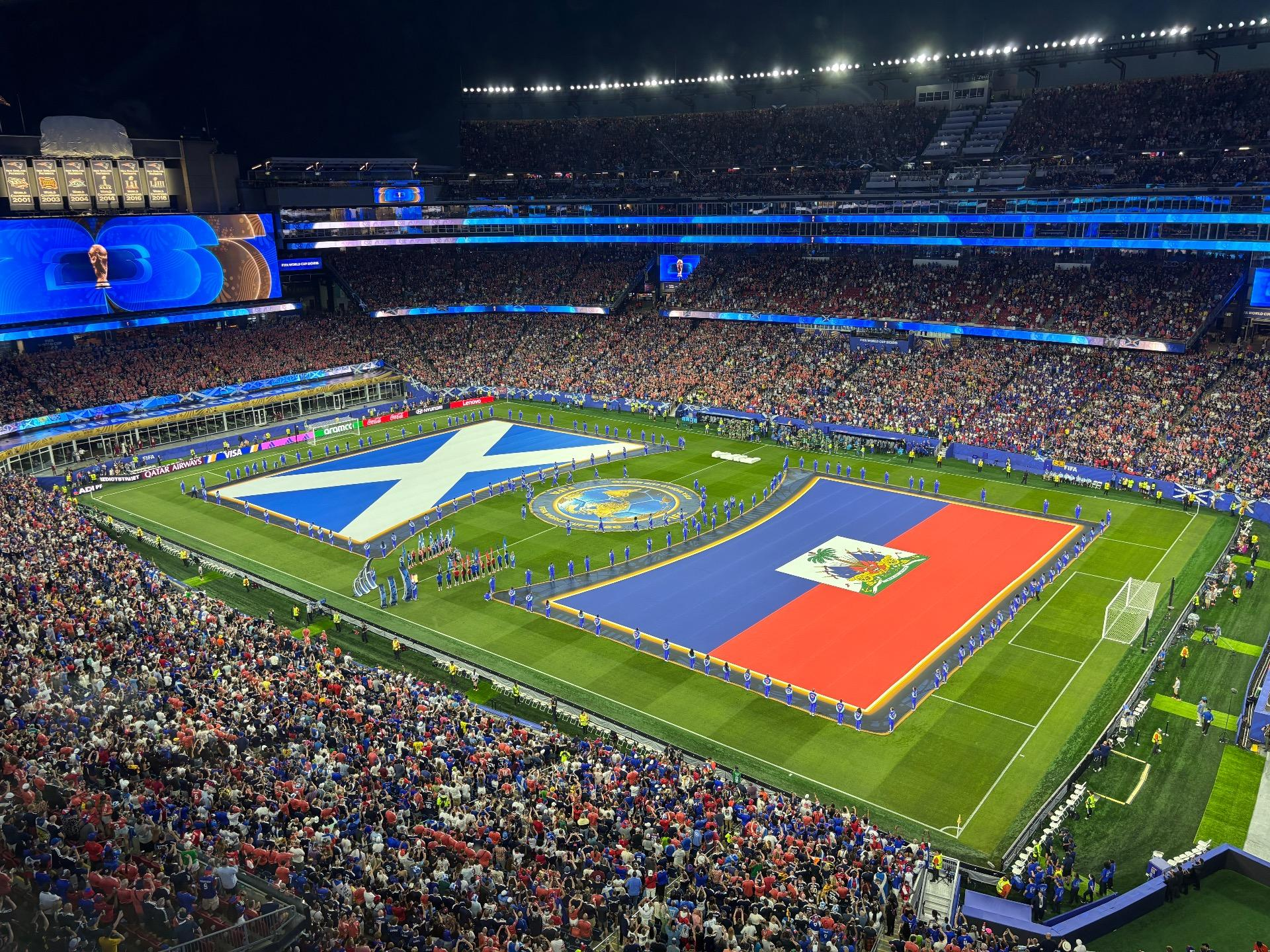
Inside Gillette Stadium before the start of the Scotland vs. Haiti match during the 2026 FIFA World Cup.

The city is home to the Boston Marathon, one of the best known sporting events in the city. It is a 42.195-kilometre (26.219 mi) run from Hopkinton to Copley Square in the Back Bay and the world's oldest annual marathon, running on Patriots' Day in April.

The city is home to the Head of the Charles Regatta. Longwood Cricket Club (despite its name) is the oldest tennis club in the New World, located in Chestnut Hill. It is the site of the first Davis Cup competition. Boston is the start and finish for the Boston–Montreal–Boston cycling event.

Boston's TD Garden is expected to host the 2020 Laver Cup, an international men's tennis tournament between two teams (Team World vs Team Europe). John McEnroe and Bjorn Borg will reprise their roles as captains in this fourth edition of the tournament.

In January 2015, the city was picked by the United States Olympic Committee to represent the nation in the bidding for the 2024 Olympic Games. But seven months later, the city withdrew itself from consideration amid concerns of the financial burdens associated with hosting the Olympics. Los Angeles was then selected as the US candidate and was ultimately awarded the right to host the 2028 Summer Olympics.

Boston was one of the host cities for the 1994 and 2026 FIFA World Cups.

== Rivalries ==
=== New York City ===
- Red Sox–Yankees rivalry
- Jets–Patriots rivalry
- Giants–Patriots rivalry
- Celtics–Knicks rivalry
- Bruins–Rangers rivalry

=== Philadelphia ===
- 76ers–Celtics rivalry
- Bruins–Flyers rivalry

=== Miami ===
- Dolphins–Patriots rivalry
- Celtics–Heat rivalry

=== Washington, D.C. ===
- D.C. United–New England Revolution rivalry

=== Other rivalries ===
- Rays–Red Sox rivalry
- Bills–Patriots rivalry
- Colts–Patriots rivalry
- Patriots–Ravens rivalry
- Patriots–Steelers rivalry
- Celtics–Lakers rivalry
- Celtics–Pistons rivalry
- Bruins–Canadiens rivalry
- Bruins–Maple Leafs rivalry

== See also ==
- Sports in Massachusetts
- The Sports Museum
- U.S. cities with teams from four major sports
- Multiple major sports championship seasons
- Timeline of Boston (includes sports events)
