= BSSC =

BSSC may refer to:

- Bally Sports SoCal
- Baltic States Swimming Championships
- Bendigo Senior Secondary College
- Boston Ski & Sports Club
- Broadcasting Satellite System Corporation
