= Celtics–Heat rivalry =

National Basketball Association rivalry

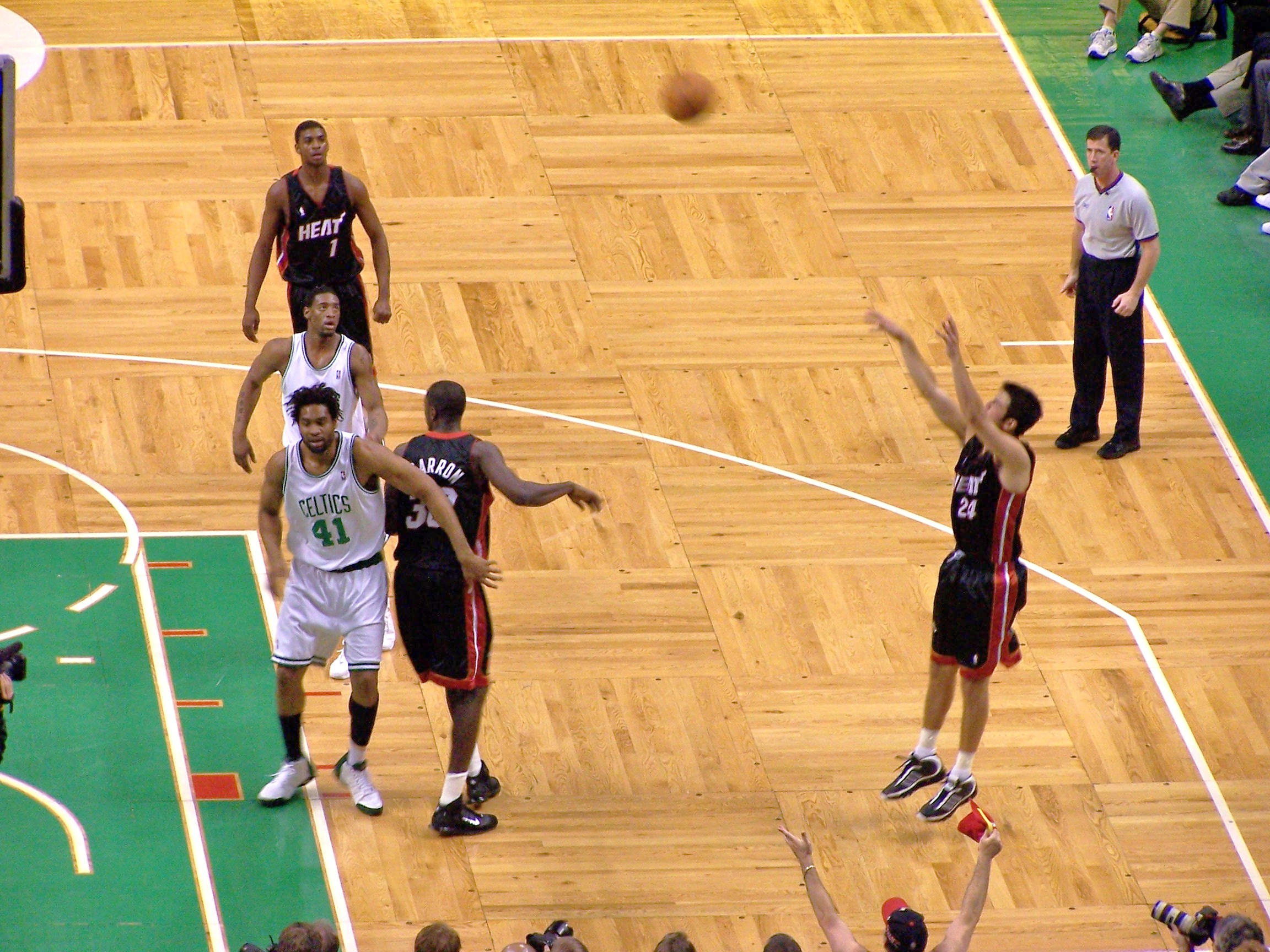
- Heat player Jason Kapono attempts an open jump shot during their final 2005–06 regular season game at TD Banknorth Garden.

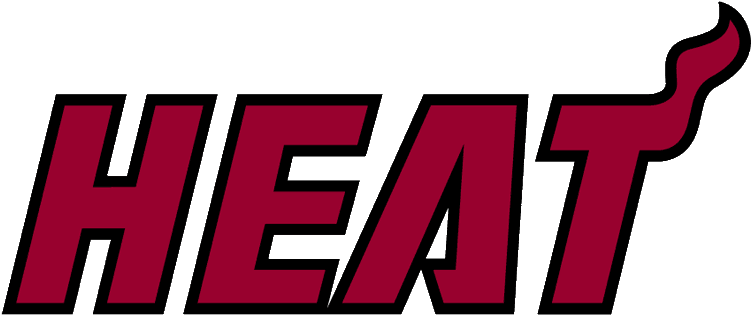
- Boston Celtics Miami Heat
- First meeting: November 15, 1988; Celtics 84, Heat 65
- Latest meeting: April 1, 2026; Celtics 147, Heat 129
- Next meeting: December 25, 2026

Statistics
- Total meetings: 186
- All-time series: Celtics: 110–77
- Regular season series: Celtics: 89–56
- Postseason results: Tied: 21–21
- Longest win streak: Celtics, 10
- Current win streak: Celtics, 4

Postseason history
- 2010 Eastern Conference First Round: Celtics won, 4–1; 2011 Eastern Conference Semifinals: Heat won, 4–1; 2012 Eastern Conference Finals: Heat won, 4–3; 2020 Eastern Conference Finals: Heat won, 4–2; 2022 Eastern Conference Finals: Celtics won, 4–3; 2023 Eastern Conference Finals: Heat won, 4–3; 2024 Eastern Conference First Round: Celtics won, 4–1

Locations of the Boston Celtics and Miami Heat.

The Celtics–Heat rivalry is a National Basketball Association (NBA) rivalry between the Boston Celtics and the Miami Heat. It is widely regarded as one of the most intense postseason rivalries in NBA history.

Media writers generally state that the rivalry between the two teams solidified in the 2010s, after both teams formed "Big Threes" that began to face each other in multiple consecutive playoff matchups.

The two teams have met each other in four Eastern Conference Finals: 2012, 2020, 2022, and 2023. All seven years the two teams have met in the postseason, the winner made the NBA Finals that year.

== History ==
=== 1980s–2000s: Pre-rivalry years ===
While the Boston Celtics formed in 1946, the Miami Heat began play in 1988 as an expansion franchise. The Celtics and Heat first played against each other on November 15, 1988; playing on the road, the Celtics defeated the Heat 84–65. Boston would win their first ten matchups against Miami.

An April 1991 game between the two sides featured the Celtics' Reggie Lewis scoring a career high 42 points in a 119–109 victory for Boston. In December 1995, the Celtics narrowly won a double overtime game against the Heat 121–120.

In 1995, head coach Pat Riley resigned from the Knicks via fax to become president and head coach of the Miami Heat, with complete control over basketball operations. Riley's addition marked the moment the Miami Heat became an NBA Finals contender. Prior to a five-year run as Knicks coach, Riley was the head coach for the Showtime Lakers from 1981 to 1990 and a big part of the Celtics-Lakers rivalry. Riley, along with star players Dwyane Wade and Shaquille O'Neal, would later lead the Heat to their first championship in franchise history in 2006.

From 1989 to 2004, both teams played in the Atlantic Division, but after the Heat moved to the newly-formed Southeast Division as part of a 2004 realignment, they became intra-conference opponents.

=== Boston and Miami's Big Threes ===
The two teams met in the playoffs for the first time in 2010, in the first round. The #4-seed Celtics were led by their Big Three of Paul Pierce, Ray Allen, and Kevin Garnett. The #5-seed Heat were led by Dwyane Wade, who averaged 33.2 points, 5.6 rebounds, and 6.8 assists in the series. During the first game of the series, Garnett elbowed Heat forward Quentin Richardson, after Richardson walked up to Paul Pierce while injured insinuating Pierce was faking his injury. This led to an on-court dust-up between the two sides and as a result, Garnett received a suspension for game two of the series and Richardson was fined. In Game 4, Wade dropped 46 points to avoid getting swept. However, the Celtics won in five games.

During the subsequent offseason, the Heat signed LeBron James and Chris Bosh. Along with Wade, the three formed Miami's own "Big Three". James announced his decision to sign with the Heat in The Decision, a television special that garnered him much criticism. In particular, James had developed a personal rivalry with the Celtics during his time with Cleveland Cavaliers as the Celtics eliminated the Cavaliers in the playoffs in 2008 and 2010. NBA.com writer John Schuhmann wrote: "If the Celtics' big three didn't come together in 2007 via a pair of big trades, the Heat's big three probably wouldn't have come together last summer via free agency. Boston is the blueprint. Miami is the newer, more talented version." The NBA scheduled the Celtics and Heat to play against each other for the 2010–11 NBA season's opening day.

Near the end of 2010, The New York Times wrote on a Celtics win over the New York Knicks: "With their win over the Knicks on Wednesday, the Celtics conquered the NBA, though Boston fans now demonize the Miami Heat as surrogate Yankees," referencing the Red Sox–Yankees rivalry.

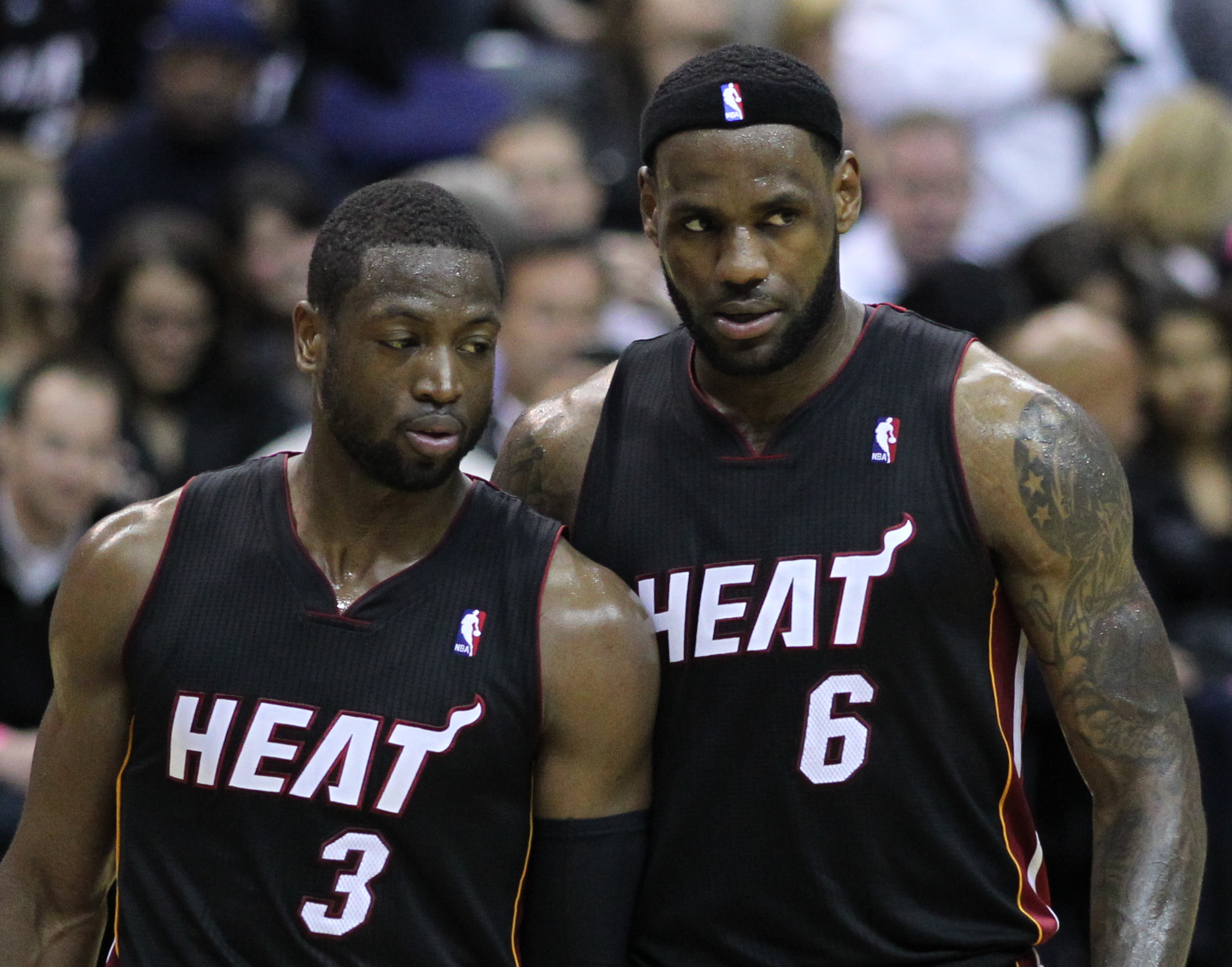
Dwyane Wade and LeBron James helped propel the Heat over the Celtics in the 2011 and 2012 postseasons

Now with James and Bosh on the roster, the two teams met in the 2011 Eastern Conference Semifinals. As the #2-seed, the Heat had home court advantage over the #3-seed Celtics. James called the series "personal" for him, citing his losses to the Celtics while a member of the Cavaliers. In Game 5 of the series, Wade and James scored 34 and 33, respectively. James went on a 10–0 scoring run to close out game, securing a 4–1 series win for the Heat. The Celtics and Heat once again faced off in the postseason in 2012, this time in the Eastern Conference finals (ECF). The Heat were the #2-seed while the Celtics were the #4-seed, giving the Heat home court advantage. James fouled out of Game 4, while Wade missed a potential game-winning basket at the buzzer. Later, down 3–2 in the series, the Heat went on the road to face the Celtics in game six of the series. Helping the Heat tie the series, James had 45 points, 15 rebounds, and five assists. Praised by basketball media at the time, sportswriters have also retrospectively noted James' game six performance as one of his best and most important. The Heat won the series 4–3 after winning Game 7 by a score of 101–88. James later stated that he feared a loss to the Celtics in 2012 would have caused the Heat's Big Three to break up before winning a championship.

With these three straight postseason meetings, the Heat's rivalry with the Celtics became their most notable since their rivalry with the Knicks, according to Bleacher Report. Boston's Rajon Rondo also played a pivotal role in the rivalry during this period. Writing for Business Insider, Tony Manfred stated much of the rivalry was based on off-court narratives, but called Rondo "the only reason these two team have an actual on-court rivalry." Writing for Bleacher Report, Jason Reindollar called the rivalry between the two teams "official" following their 2012 ECF matchup.

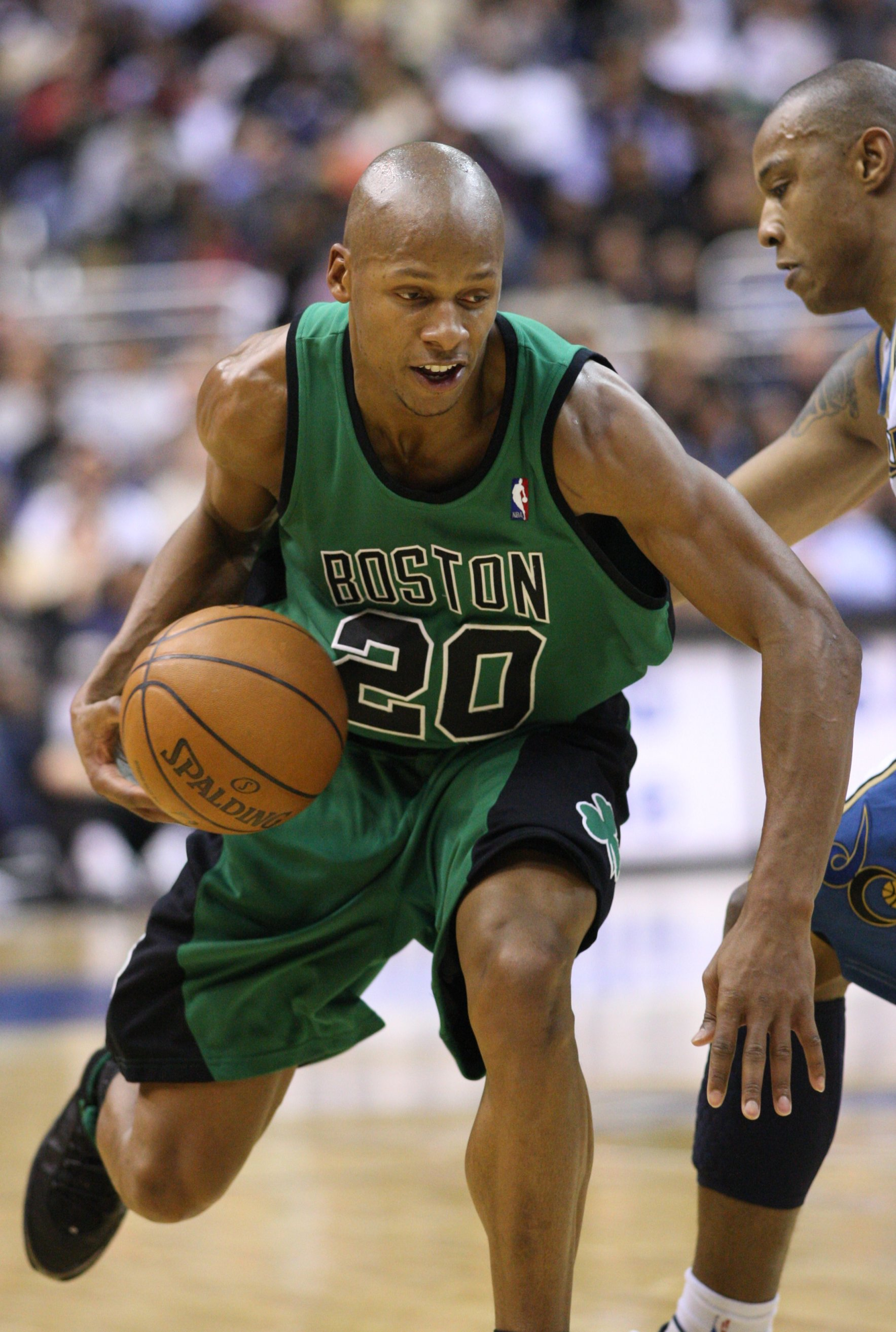
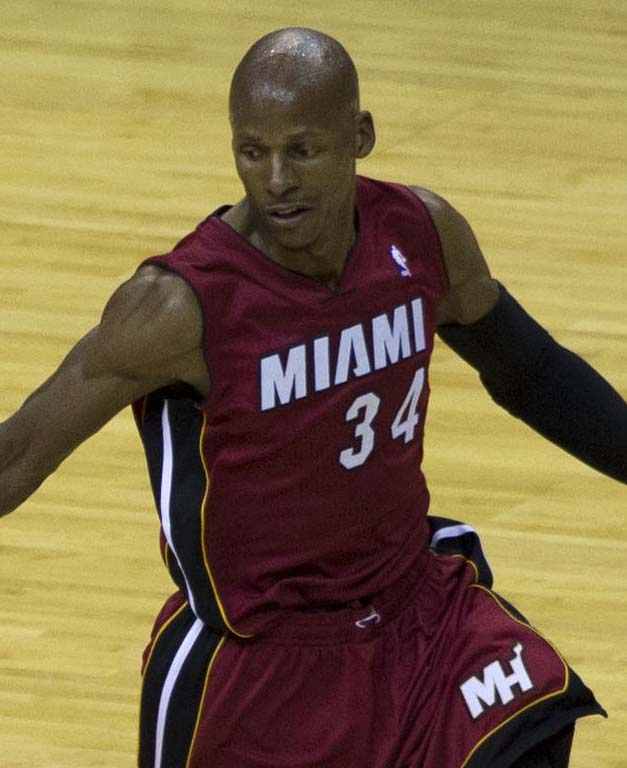
Ray Allen departed Boston and signed with the Heat in 2012

During the offseason, Allen signed with the Heat. A rift between Allen and Rondo was cited as a factor for Allen's departure from Boston. Garnett, Rondo, and Pierce were reported to hold a grudge with Allen for multiple years after. Doc Rivers, who coached the Celtics from 2004 to 2013, has discussed the rift and taken blame for it. The two teams opened up their 2012–13 NBA season playing against each other in Miami. The game continued the rivalry's intense and physical nature, with Rondo being noted to grab Wade around the neck in the game. During the season, the Heat achieved a 27-game win streak, which included a game against the Celtics. The game featured James finishing a fast break by dunking on Jason Terry, a "personal rival" of James' according to Brian Windhorst.

The two front offices would get involved in the rivalry in the middle of the 2012–13 season. During a radio interview, Celtics general manager Danny Ainge criticized James for his complaints about officiating, causing Heat general manager Pat Riley to issue a statement, saying: "Danny Ainge needs to shut the fuck up and manage his own team. He was the biggest whiner going when he was playing, and I know that because I coached against him." In response, Ainge would issue a statement of his own: "I stand by what I said. That's all. I don't care about Pat Riley. He can say whatever he wants. I don't want to mess up his Armani suits and all that hair goop. It would be way too expensive for me." The two were noted to have a personal rivalry stemming for 30 years, dating back to when Ainge played for the Celtics and Riley was the head coach of the Los Angeles Lakers, which itself was a very storied team rivalry. Ainge would eventually tell The Boston Globe "we're both right. LeBron should stop complaining and I should manage my own team." Both head coaches expressed amusement with the exchange between their general managers, with Rivers calling it "cool" and jokingly suggesting that Riley and Ainge "should duke it out", and Heat coach Erik Spoelstra stating "I love direct GM to GM communication. That's awesome."

The Heat did not meet the Celtics in the 2013 postseason, but Allen helped the Heat win their second consecutive championship with a clutch game-tying shot in game six of the Finals.

=== Tatum–Butler: 2020s era ===
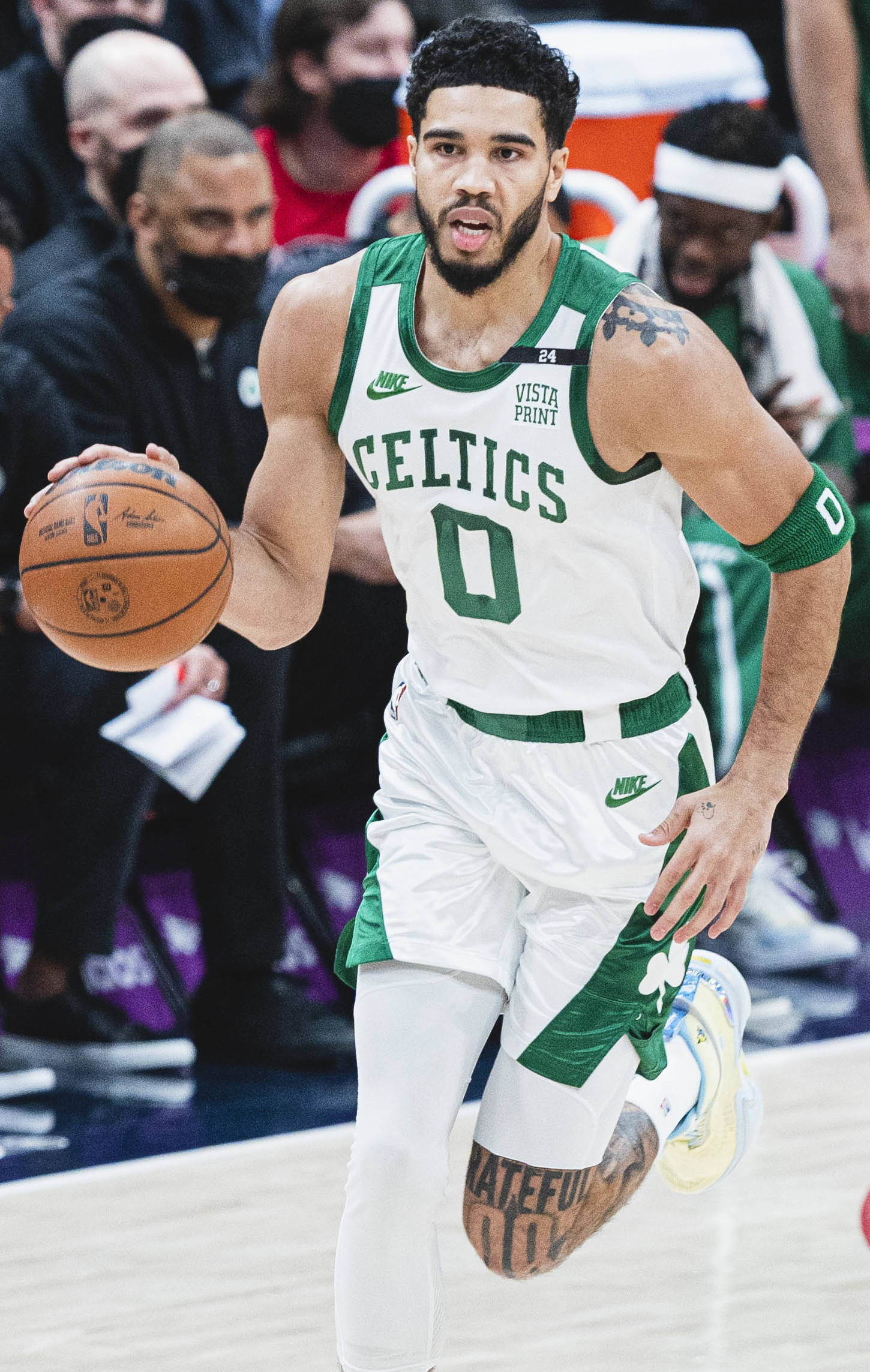
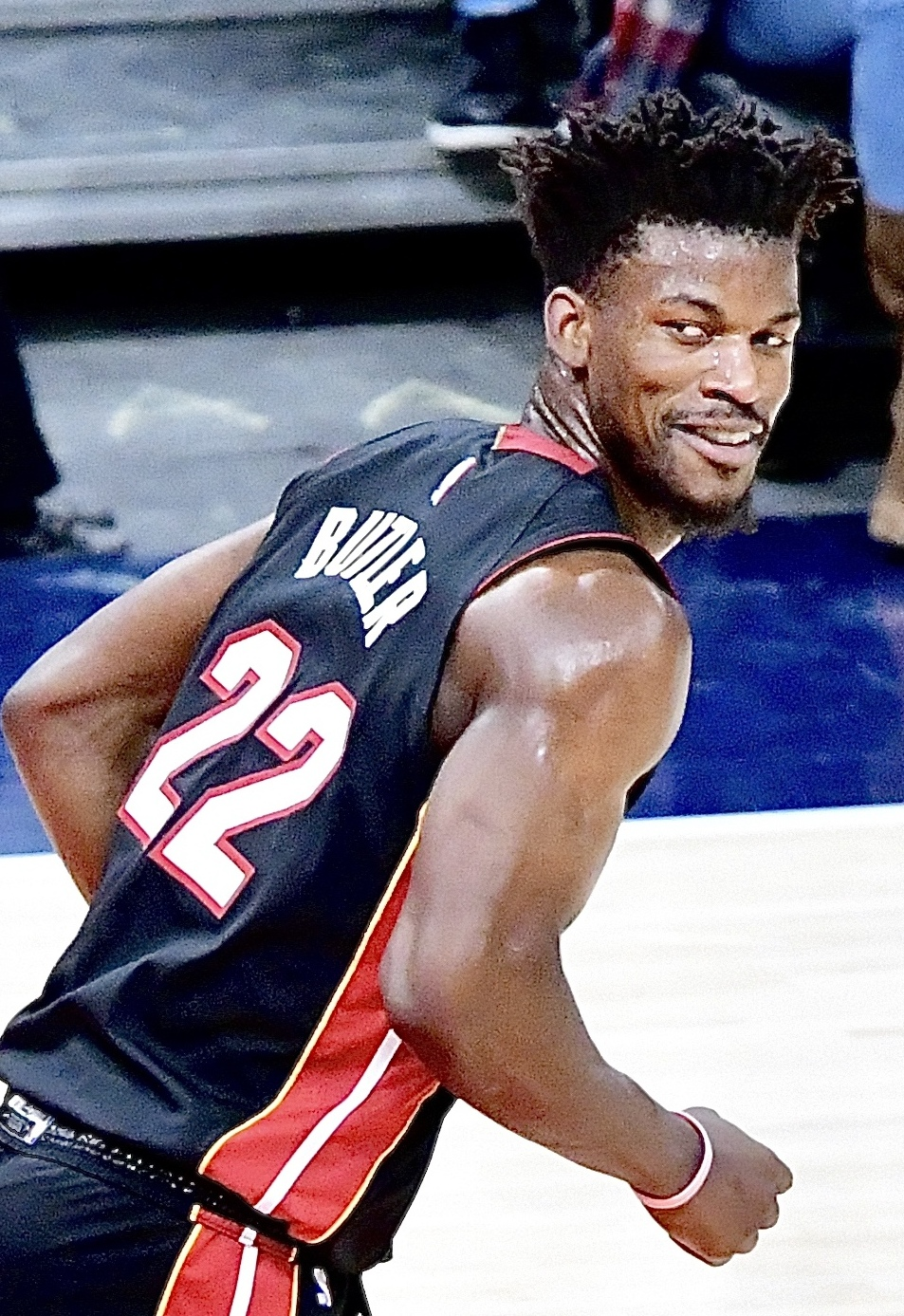
Boston's Jayson Tatum and Miami's Jimmy Butler were the first two winners of the Larry Bird Trophy for their performances in the 2022 and 2023 Eastern Conference Finals, respectively.

The Celtics and Heat once again met in the Eastern Conference Finals in 2020. The Heat's Udonis Haslem was the only remaining player from the two teams' prior playoff meeting. The #3-seed Celtics were led by a core of Jayson Tatum, Jaylen Brown, and Marcus Smart. The #5-seed Heat were led by Jimmy Butler and Bam Adebayo. The series took place at a neutral "bubble" site in Orlando due to the COVID-19 pandemic. During Game 4, rookie Heat guard Tyler Herro scored 37 points, becoming the fourth player aged 20 or younger to score 30 points in the NBA playoffs. The Heat won the series in six games.

Two years later, the Celtics and Heat faced off against each other in another ECF matchup, with the Heat as the #1-seed and the Celtics as the #2-seed. Sportswriters noted the series as having drastic swings, calling it an "ugly" and "physical, back-and-forth" affair. Writing for Sports Illustrated, Chris Mannix commented that game five was a particularly bad viewing experience, citing the two teams' poor offensive performances. Down 3–2 in the series, Butler scored 47 points, while also grabbing nine rebounds and recording eight assists to help Miami force a Game 7. Butler's performance drew comparisons to James' 45-point performance from a decade prior. Down by two with under a minute left in the game, Butler attempted a three-pointer to put the Heat ahead but missed. The Celtics defeated the Heat 100–96 on the road in Game 7, winning the series and clinching a berth to the 2022 NBA Finals. It also was Boston's first postseason win against Miami since 2010. Jayson Tatum scored 26 points in the game for the Celtics and was awarded the inaugural Eastern Conference Finals MVP award, dubbed the Larry Bird Trophy.

The NBA introduced a "Rivals Week" in the 2022–23 season; the Heat and Celtics faced off against each other during the week. The two teams once again met in the 2023 Eastern Conference Finals, with the Celtics entering the series as the #2-seed and the Heat as the #8-seed. Prior to the series, ESPN Analytics gave the Heat a 3% chance of making the Finals. Despite this, Miami took a 3–0 series lead. The Celtics would respond by winning the next three games, punctuated with a go-ahead shot with 0.2 seconds left on the clock by Derrick White during Game 6 in Miami. In doing so, the Celtics became the fourth team in NBA history to force a Game 7 after going down 0–3, and the only one to force a Game 7 at home. Tatum injured his ankle on the first possession of Game 7, though remained in the game. Miami won the deciding game in Boston, resulting in the Heat becoming the second #8-seed in NBA history to reach the Finals and avoiding the distinction of becoming the first team to squander a 3–0 playoff series lead. Butler won the Larry Bird Trophy as the Eastern Conference finals MVP, succeeding Tatum.

In the 2023–24 NBA season, the Celtics were dominant, winning a league-leading 64 games in the regular season and clinching the #1-seed in the East. Conversely, the Heat narrowly made the playoffs, clinching the #8-seed through the play-in tournament. The two teams met in the first round of the playoffs, though the Heat were without Butler for the series due to a knee injury he sustained in the play-in. The series was tied after two games, with the Heat setting a franchise playoff record for three-pointers made in Game 2, though the Celtics were able to dispatch the Heat in five games en route to a 2024 NBA Finals victory.

== Season-by-season results ==
Boston Celtics vs. Miami Heat Season-by-Season Results
1980s (Celtics, 7–0)

Season	Season series		at Boston Celtics	at Miami Heat	Overall series	Notes
1988–89	Celtics	2–0	Celtics, 1–0	Celtics, 1–0	Celtics; 2–0	Miami Heat join the NBA as an expansion team. They are placed in the Western Conference and Midwest Division.
1989–90	Celtics	5–0	Celtics, 2–0	Celtics, 3–0	Celtics; 7–0	Heat move to the Eastern Conference and are placed in the Atlantic Division, joining the Celtics as divisional rivals.

1990s (Celtics, 23–20)

Season	Season series		at Boston Celtics	at Miami Heat	Overall series	Notes
1990–91	Celtics	4–1	Celtics, 3–0	Tie, 1–1	Celtics; 11–1	Celtics win 10 games in a row against the Heat. Celtics win the Atlantic Division.
1991–92	Celtics	3–2	Celtics, 2–0	Heat, 2–1	Celtics; 14–3	Last season Larry Bird played for the Celtics. Celtics win the Atlantic Division.
1992–93	Celtics	3–1	Celtics, 2–0	Tie, 1–1	Celtics; 17–4	Celtics win 10 home games in a row against the Heat.
1993–94	Heat	3–2	Heat, 2–1	Tie, 1–1	Celtics; 19–7	On December 11, 1993, Heat beat the Celtics 111–80, their largest victory against the Celtics with a 31-point differential. Heat win the season series against the Celtics and finish with a winning record at Boston for the first time.
1994–95	Celtics	4–1	Celtics, 2–0	Celtics, 2–1	Celtics; 23–8	Last season Celtics played at Boston Garden.
1995–96	Celtics	3–1	Tie, 1–1	Celtics, 2–0	Celtics; 26–9	Celtics open up Fleet Center (now known as TD Garden).
1996–97	Heat	4–0	Heat, 2–0	Heat, 2–0	Celtics; 26–13	Heat sweep the season series against the Celtics for the first time. Heat win the Atlantic Division, their first divisional title.
1997–98	Heat	4–0	Heat, 2–0	Heat, 2–0	Celtics; 26–17	Heat win the Atlantic Division.
1998–99	Celtics	3–0	Celtics, 1–0	Celtics, 2–0	Celtics; 29–17	Celtics draft Paul Pierce. Heat win the Atlantic Division.
1999–2000	Heat	3–1	Tie, 1–1	Heat, 2–0	Celtics; 30–20	Last season Heat played at Miami Arena. On January 2, 2000, Heat open up and move to American Airlines Arena (now known as Kaseya Center). Heat win the Atlantic Division for the last time.

2000s (Celtics, 22–15)

Season	Season series		at Boston Celtics	at Miami Heat	Overall series	Notes
2000–01	Tie	2–2	Tie, 1–1	Tie, 1–1	Celtics; 32–22	
2001–02	Celtics	3–1	Tie, 1-1	Celtics, 2–0	Celtics; 35–23	
2002–03	Tie	2–2	Tie, 1–1	Tie, 1–1	Celtics; 37–25	
2003–04	Tie	2–2	Tie, 1–1	Tie, 1–1	Celtics; 39–27	Heat draft Dwyane Wade.
2004–05	Heat	2–1	Celtics, 1–0	Heat, 2–0	Celtics; 40–29	Heat move from the Atlantic Division and are placed in the new Southeast Division, making them no longer divisional rivals with the Celtics.
2005–06	Heat	3–1	Tie, 1–1	Heat, 2–0	Celtics; 41–32	Heat win 2006 NBA Finals, their first NBA championship.
2006–07	Heat	2–1	Heat, 2–0	Celtics, 1–0	Celtics; 42–34	
2007–08	Celtics	4–0	Celtics, 2–0	Celtics, 2–0	Celtics; 46–34	Kevin Garnett and Ray Allen make their debut for the Celtics. Celtics finish with the best record in the league (66–16). Celtics win 2008 NBA Finals.
2008–09	Celtics	3–1	Celtics, 2–0	Tie, 1–1	Celtics; 49–35	
2009–10	Celtics	3–0	Celtics, 1–0	Celtics, 2–0	Celtics; 52–35	Celtics lose 2010 NBA Finals.

2010s (Celtics, 31–23)

Season	Season series		at Boston Celtics	at Miami Heat	Overall series	Notes
2010 Eastern Conference First Round	Celtics	4–1	Celtics, 3–0	Tie, 1–1	Celtics; 56–36	First postseason series. Celtics go on to lose 2010 NBA Finals.
2010–11	Celtics	3–1	Celtics, 2–0	Tie, 1–1	Celtics; 59–37	LeBron James and Chris Bosh make their debut for the Heat.
2011 Eastern Conference Semifinals	Heat	4–1	Tie, 1–1	Heat, 3-0	Celtics; 60–41	Second postseason series. Heat go on to lose 2011 NBA Finals.
2011–12	Celtics	3–1	Celtics, 2–0	Tie, 1–1	Celtics; 63–42	Last season Ray Allen played for the Celtics.
2012 Eastern Conference Finals	Heat	4–3	Celtics, 2–1	Heat, 3–1	Celtics; 66–46	Third postseason series. Heat go on to win 2012 NBA Finals.
2012–13	Heat	3–1	Tie, 1–1	Heat, 2–0	Celtics; 67–49	Ray Allen makes his debut for the Heat. Last season Kevin Garnett played for the Celtics. Heat finish with the best record in the league (66–16). Heat win 2013 NBA Finals.
2013–14	Celtics	2–1	Celtics, 1–0	Tie, 1–1	Celtics; 69–50	Last season LeBron James and Ray Allen played for the Heat. Heat lose 2014 NBA Finals.
2014–15	Heat	3–1	Heat, 2–0	Tie, 1–1	Celtics; 70–53	
2015–16	Celtics	3–0	Celtics, 2–0	Celtics, 1–0	Celtics; 73–53	
2016–17	Celtics	4–0	Celtics, 2–0	Celtics, 2–0	Celtics; 77–53	Celtics draft Jaylen Brown. Last season Chris Bosh played for the Heat.
2017–18	Heat	3–1	Heat, 1–0	Tie, 1–1	Celtics; 78–56	Celtics draft Jayson Tatum.
2018–19	Celtics	3–1	Celtics, 2–0	Tie, 1–1	Celtics; 81–57	Last season Dwyane Wade played for the Heat.
2019–20	Celtics	2–1	Celtics, 1–0	Tie, 1–1	Celtics; 83–58	Jimmy Butler makes his debut for the Heat. Due to the COVID-19 pandemic suspending the season, their remaining game at Boston was canceled, while their remaining game at Miami was played in the 2020 NBA Bubble.

2020s (Celtics, 27–18)

Season	Season series		at Boston Celtics	at Miami Heat	Overall series	Notes
2020 Eastern Conference Finals	Heat	4–2	Heat, 2–1	Heat, 2–1	Celtics; 85–62	Fourth postseason series. Heat go on to lose 2020 NBA Finals.
2020–21	Heat	2–1	Heat, 2–0	Celtics, 1–0	Celtics; 86–64	On May 9, 2021, Heat score their most-ever points in a game against the Celtics, beating them 130–124.
2021–22	Celtics	2–1	Tie, 1–1	Celtics, 1–0	Celtics; 88–65	
2022 Eastern Conference Finals	Celtics	4–3	Heat, 2–1	Celtics, 3–1	Celtics; 92–68	Fifth postseason series. Celtics go on to lose 2022 NBA Finals.
2022–23	Tie	2–2	Tie, 1–1	Tie, 1–1	Celtics; 94–70	
2023 Eastern Conference Finals	Heat	4–3	Heat, 3–1	Celtics, 2–1	Celtics; 97–74	Sixth postseason series. Celtics become the fourth team in NBA history to force a game seven after falling behind 0–3 in a series and the first team to host a game seven after trailing 3–0 in a series. Heat become the first 8th-seed since the 1998–99 New York Knicks to reach the NBA Finals. Heat go on to lose 2023 NBA Finals.
2023–24	Celtics	3–0	Celtics, 1–0	Celtics, 2–0	Celtics; 100–74	On January 25, 2024, the Celtics beat the Heat 143–110, their largest victory against the Heat with a 33-point differential and their most points scored in a game against the Heat. Celtics record their 100th win over the Heat. Celtics win their first Maurice Podoloff Trophy, with a 64–18 regular season record.
2024 Eastern Conference First Round	Celtics	4–1	Celtics, 2–1	Celtics, 2–0	Celtics; 104–75	Seventh postseason series. Celtics go on to win 2024 NBA Finals.
2024–25	Celtics	3–1	Tie, 1–1	Celtics, 2–0	Celtics; 107–76	Jimmy Butler traded to the Golden State Warriors during the season.
2025–26	Celtics	4–0	Celtics, 2–0	Celtics, 2–0	Celtics; 111–76	Last season Jaylen Brown played for the Celtics.
2026–27	Tie	0–0	December 25, 2026 and April 2, 2027	March 27, 2027	Celtics; 111–76	First season for Giannis Antetokounmpo in the rivalry. One game will be played on Christmas.

Summary of Results

Season	Season series		at Boston Celtics	at Miami Heat	Notes
Regular season games	Celtics	90–56	Celtics, 46–26	Celtics, 44–30	
Postseason games	Tie	21–21	Celtics, 11–10	Heat, 11–10	
Postseason series	Heat	4–3	Celtics, 2–1	Heat, 3–1	Eastern Conference First Round: 2010, 2024; Eastern Conference Semifinals: 2011; Eastern Conference Finals: 2012, 2020, 2022, 2023
Regular and postseason	Celtics	111–75	Celtics, 57–35	Celtics, 54–41	

== See also ==
- List of NBA rivalries
- Dolphins–Patriots rivalry
