= Dolphins–Patriots rivalry =

National Football League rivalry

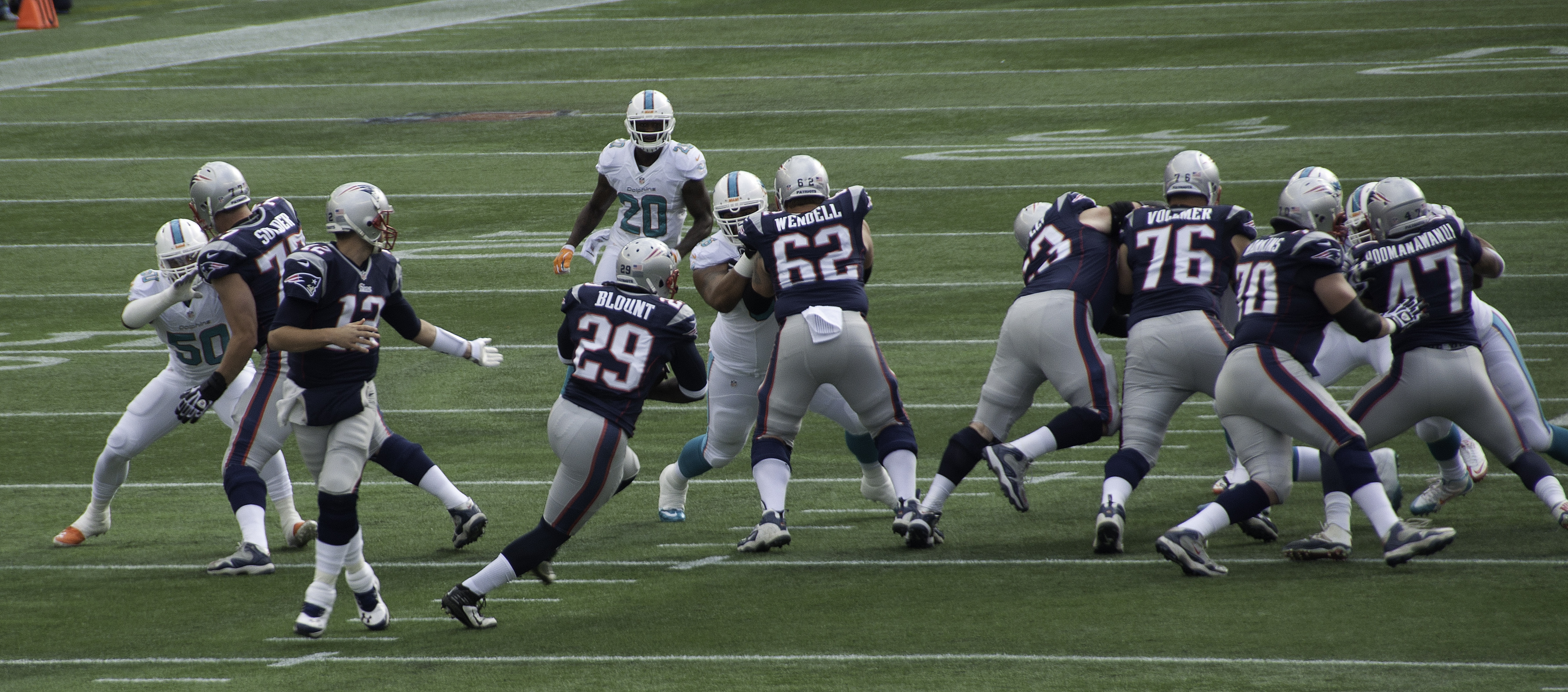
- Dolphins and Patriots face off during the 2013 season.

- Miami Dolphins New England Patriots
- Location: Miami, Foxborough
- First meeting: November 27, 1966; Patriots 20, Dolphins 14
- Latest meeting: November 1, 2026; Patriots 24, Dolphins 19
- Next meeting: January 9/10, 2027
- Stadiums: Dolphins: Hard Rock Stadium; Patriots: Gillette Stadium

Statistics
- Total meetings: 122
- All-time series: Dolphins: 64–58
- Regular season series: Dolphins: 63–56
- Postseason results: Patriots: 2–1
- Largest victory: Dolphins: 52–0 (1972); Patriots: 43–0 (2019)
- Most points scored: Dolphins: 52 (1972); Patriots: 49 (2007)
- Longest win streak: Dolphins: 9 (1989–1993); Patriots: 7 (1985–1988, 2010–2013)
- Current win streak: Patriots: 3 (2025–present)

Post-season history
- 1982 AFC Wild Card: Dolphins won: 28–13; 1985 AFC Championship: Patriots won: 31–14; 1997 AFC Wild Card: Patriots won: 17–3

The Dolphins–Patriots rivalry is a U.S. National Football League (NFL) rivalry between the Miami Dolphins and New England Patriots.

The Dolphins joined the AFL in the 1966 season, being placed in the AFL Eastern Division alongside the Patriots, becoming divisional rivals with them. Following the AFL–NFL merger, the Dolphins and Patriots joined the National Football League (NFL) and were placed in the American Football Conference (AFC) and the AFC East.

The Dolphins lead the overall series, 64–58. The two teams have met three times in the playoffs, with the Patriots holding a 2–1 record.

== Characteristics and history ==
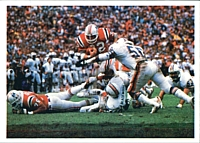
Patriots running back Craig James rushes the ball past the Dolphins' defense in the 1985 AFC Championship game.

While not as famous as some other rivalries, the rivalry has a long history that dates back to the 1960s. The beginning of the rivalry was dominated by the Dolphins, as at the time the Dolphins were one of the NFL's most successful teams, while the Patriots were one of the worst. However, this notion would change in the early 2000s when the Patriots becoming more and more successful, eventually culminating with the Brady & Belichick dynasty, while the Dolphins, and the rest of the AFC East, would become mired in mediocrity, only posting a few winning seasons, while the Patriots dominated the AFC East. The Patriots finally made the Super Bowl in 1985, having defeated Miami in the AFC Championship game to get there.

Starting in 1986, the rivalry was a little bit more even, with the Pats having a 7-game winning streak from 1986 to 1988. The Dolphins then took over the rivalry once again, winning 13 of the next 15 matchups between the 2 teams. Both teams had great quarterbacks in the 1990s, with the Patriots having Drew Bledsoe and the Dolphins with Dan Marino, both of whom appeared in at least one Super Bowl; Marino in Super Bowl XIX and Bledsoe in Super Bowl XXXI. The Dolphins continued to dominate the rivalry through the late 1990s with the Dolphins sweeping the Patriots in back to back years, 1999 and 2000.

Miami is one of 3 teams in the AFC with a winning overall record against New England (the others being the Denver Broncos and Kansas City Chiefs). Since 2003, the Patriots have dominated the rivalry, but not as much as their rivalries with their two other AFC East opponents. In 2004, one of the most famous moments in the rivalry happened where the Dolphins, 2–11 at the time, upset the defending (and eventual) Super Bowl champion Patriots, who were 12–1, in a game that has been known as "The Night That Courage Wore Orange". The rivalry briefly intensified in 2005 when Nick Saban (who previously served as defensive coordinator of the Cleveland Browns, coached by Bill Belichick at the time) was hired as the Dolphins head coach and when he nearly signed quarterback Drew Brees with the Dolphins, as well as in 2008 when the Dolphins became the only team other than the Patriots since 2003 to win the division. In Week 3 of the aforementioned 2008 season, the Dolphins used the Wildcat formation to throw the Patriots (who were without Tom Brady that year because of an ACL injury earlier in the season) off and went on to upset them, 38–13, snapping their 20-game regular season winning streak that dated back to December 10, 2006, which coincidentally, the Patriots were also beat by the Dolphins. In 2018, the Dolphins upset the Patriots in Miami for the second year in a row, this time with a last-minute hook and lateral scoring play in what is known as the "Miracle in Miami". Despite the loss, which ended up costing the Patriots the top seed in the playoffs, New England went on to win the Super Bowl, and Tom Brady later stated he didn't consider the game a loss.

On February 4, 2019, the Dolphins hired a long-time Patriots assistant, Brian Flores (who had been with the team since their 2004 Super Bowl-winning season) as the 12th head coach in franchise history. In 2021, the rivalry intensified once again after the Patriots drafted Alabama quarterback Mac Jones, a former college teammate of Dolphins quarterback Tua Tagovailoa, whom Jones backed up in the first half of the 2019 season until a season-ending hip injury from Tagovailoa caused Jones to take the helms at quarterback for Alabama. Both quarterbacks led Alabama to national titles in 2018 and 2021, respectively. In 2022, the Dolphins hired former Patriots wide receiver Wes Welker to be their new wide receivers coach. Welker previously played for the Dolphins from 2004 to 2006 and the hiring would reunite him with Dolphins defensive coordinator and former long-time Patriots assistant Josh Boyer, whom was serving as a defensive assistant and later the defensive backs coach during Welker's tenure with New England (2007–2012).

Also notable is the fact that the Dolphins and Patriots are the only NFL teams to post undefeated regular season records following the NFL-AFL merger. The 1972 Dolphins finished with a 14–0 regular season record and went on to win Super Bowl VII, finishing the only complete perfect season in NFL history, while the 2007 Patriots were the first team to go undefeated in the regular season since the league expanded to 16 games, but famously lost Super Bowl XLII against the New York Giants. Additionally, both teams have had long-tenured coaches in Don Shula and Bill Belichick, respectively.

=== 2023 deadly fan altercation ===
During the Dolphins–Patriots game in Foxboro on September 17, 2023, a Patriots fan died after an altercation with Dolphins fans. The Patriots fan, Dale Mooney, had confronted a Dolphins fan who had been arguing with his group before another Dolphins fan delivered two punches to Mooney, who fell unconscious and was later pronounced dead at a hospital. Despite the attack, an autopsy found that Mooney did not suffer a traumatic injury directly from the punches and instead succumbed to a "medical issue", which a witness to the altercation surmised was a heart attack from "getting worked up from the scuffle". Two men from Rhode Island, John Vieira and Justin Mitchell, were later charged in Mooney's death for assault and battery and disorderly conduct, but not for homicide despite the medical examiner ruling Mooney's cause of death to be homicide.

== Season-by-season results ==
Miami Dolphins vs. Boston/New England Patriots Season-by-Season Results
1960s (Dolphins, 4–3)

Season	Season series	at Miami Dolphins	at Boston Patriots	Overall series	Notes
1966	Patriots 1–0	Patriots; 20–14	no game	Patriots; 1–0	Dolphins join the American Football League (AFL) as an expansion team. They are placed in the AFL Eastern Division, resulting in two meetings annually with the Patriots.
1967	Tie 1–1	Dolphins; 41–32	Patriots; 41–10	Patriots; 2–1	
1968	Dolphins 2–0	Dolphins; 38–7	Dolphins; 34–10	Dolphins; 3–2	
1969	Tie 1–1	Patriots; 38–23	Dolphins; 17–16	Dolphins; 4–3	Dolphins' home game was played at Tampa Stadium in Tampa.

1970s (Dolphins, 13–7)

Season	Season series	at Miami Dolphins	at Boston/New England Patriots	Overall series	Notes
1970	Tie 1–1	Dolphins; 37–20	Patriots; 27–14	Dolphins; 5–4	As a result of the AFL–NFL merger, the Dolphins and Patriots are placed in the AFC East. Dolphins hire Don Shula as their head coach. Patriots' win was their only home win in the 1970 season.
1971	Tie 1–1	Dolphins; 41–3	Patriots; 34–13	Dolphins; 6–5	Patriots open Schaefer Stadium (now known as Foxboro Stadium) and change their name to "New England Patriots". Starting with their home win, the Dolphins went on a 31-game home winning streak, an NFL record. Dolphins lose Super Bowl VI.
1972	Dolphins 2–0	Dolphins; 52–0	Dolphins; 37–21	Dolphins; 8–5	In Miami, Dolphins set franchise records for their largest victory overall with a 52–point differential, their most points scored in a game (broken in 1977) and their most points scored in a game against the Patriots. Meanwhile, Patriots set franchise records their worst loss overall and their most points allowed in a game. Dolphins win Super Bowl VII to complete the NFL's first 17-0 season.
1973	Dolphins 2–0	Dolphins; 44–23	Dolphins; 30–14	Dolphins; 10–5	Dolphins win Super Bowl VIII.
1974	Tie 1–1	Dolphins; 34–27	Patriots; 34–24	Dolphins; 11–6	In Miami, the Dolphins overcame a 24–0 deficit, completing the largest comeback in franchise history. The 24-blown lead marked the largest in Patriots franchise history.
1975	Dolphins 2–0	Dolphins; 20–7	Dolphins; 22–14	Dolphins; 13–6	
1976	Tie 1–1	Dolphins; 10–3	Patriots; 30–14	Dolphins; 14–7	
1977	Tie 1–1	Dolphins; 17–5	Patriots; 14–10	Dolphins; 15–8	
1978	Tie 1–1	Dolphins; 23–3	Patriots; 33–24	Dolphins; 16–9	In Miami, QB Bob Griese finished with a perfect passer rating (158.3). Both teams finished with 11–5 records, but the Patriots clinched the AFC East based on having a better division record.
1979	Tie 1–1	Dolphins; 39–24	Patriots; 28–13	Dolphins; 17–10	

1980s (Patriots, 11–10)

Season	Season series	at Miami Dolphins	at New England Patriots	Overall series	Notes
1980	Tie 1–1	Dolphins; 16–13 (OT)	Patriots; 34–0	Dolphins; 18–11	First overtime result in the series. In New England, Dolphins finish with 88 total yards, setting a franchise record for the fewest yards in a game.
1981	Dolphins 2–0	Dolphins; 24–14	Dolphins; 30–27 (OT)	Dolphins; 20–11	
1982	Patriots 1–0	canceled	Patriots; 3–0	Dolphins; 20–12	Due to the 1982 NFL Players' strike, the game scheduled in Miami was canceled. Game in New England became known as the Snowplow Game. Dolphins lose Super Bowl XVII.
1982 Playoffs	Dolphins 1–0	Dolphins; 28–13		Dolphins; 21–12	AFC First Round.
1983	Tie 1–1	Dolphins; 34–24	Patriots; 17–6	Dolphins; 22–13	Dolphins draft QB Dan Marino.
1984	Dolphins 2–0	Dolphins; 28–7	Dolphins; 44–24	Dolphins; 24–13	In New England, Dolphins finish with 552 total yards, setting a franchise record for their most total yards in a game (broken in 1988). Dolphins lose Super Bowl XIX.
1985	Tie 1–1	Dolphins; 30–27	Patriots; 17–13	Dolphins; 25–14	Dolphins win 18 straight home meetings (1970-1985).
1985 Playoffs	Patriots 1–0	Patriots; 31–14		Dolphins; 25–15	AFC Championship Game. Patriots' first road win against the Dolphins since the 1969 season and first win in Miami since the 1966 season. Dolphins' only home loss in their 1985 season after going 8–0 in the regular season. Patriots go on to lose Super Bowl XX.
1986	Patriots 2–0	Patriots; 34–27	Patriots; 34–7	Dolphins; 25–17	Patriots record their first season series sweep against the Dolphins.
1987	Patriots 2–0	Patriots; 24–10	Patriots; 28–21	Dolphins; 25–19	Dolphins open Hard Rock Stadium (then known as Joe Robbie Stadium).
1988	Patriots 2–0	Patriots; 6–3	Patriots; 21–10	Dolphins; 25–21	
1989	Dolphins 2–0	Dolphins; 31–10	Dolphins; 24–10	Dolphins; 27–21	

1990s (Dolphins, 14–7)

Season	Season series	at Miami Dolphins	at New England Patriots	Overall series	Notes
1990	Dolphins 2–0	Dolphins; 17–10	Dolphins; 27–24	Dolphins; 29–21	In New England, Dolphins overcame a 21–6 deficit.
1991	Dolphins 2–0	Dolphins; 30–20	Dolphins; 20–10	Dolphins; 31–21	
1992	Dolphins 2–0	Dolphins; 38–17	Dolphins; 16–13 (OT)	Dolphins; 33–21	
1993	Tie 1–1	Dolphins; 17–13	Patriots; 33–27 (OT)	Dolphins; 34–22	Dolphins win nine straight meetings (1989–1993). Patriots eliminate Dolphins from playoff contention with their win.
1994	Dolphins 2–0	Dolphins; 39–35	Dolphins; 23–3	Dolphins; 36–22	Game in Miami marked Dolphins' QB Dan Marino's first game after missing most of the 1993 season due to a torn Achilles' tendon. Marino and Patriots' QB Drew Bledsoe threw for over 400 yards. Both teams finished with 10–6 records, but the Dolphins clinched the AFC East based on their head-to-head sweep.
1995	Tie 1–1	Patriots; 34–17	Dolphins; 20–3	Dolphins; 37–23	Road team splits the season series for the first time since the 1969 season. Last season for Don Shula.
1996	Tie 1–1	Dolphins; 24–10	Patriots; 42–23	Dolphins; 38–24	Patriots lose Super Bowl XXXI.
1997	Patriots 2–0	Patriots; 14–12	Patriots; 27–24	Dolphins; 38–26	In Miami, Patriots clinched the AFC East with their win, setting up a rematch in the AFC Wild Card Round the following week.
1997 Playoffs	Patriots 1–0		Patriots; 17–3	Dolphins; 38–27	AFC Wild Card Round.
1998	Tie 1–1	Dolphins; 12–9 (OT)	Patriots; 26–23	Dolphins; 39–28	
1999	Dolphins 2–0	Dolphins; 27–17	Dolphins; 31–30	Dolphins; 41–28	In New England, Dolphins finish with 9 sacks, setting a franchise record for their most sacks in a game. Final season for Dan Marino in the series.

2000s (Patriots, 11–9)

Season	Season series	at Miami Dolphins	at New England Patriots	Overall series	Notes
2000	Dolphins 2–0	Dolphins; 10–3	Dolphins; 27–24	Dolphins; 43–28	Patriots draft QB Tom Brady and hire Bill Belichick as their head coach. Last Start for Patriots' QB Drew Bledsoe in the series. In New England, Dolphins clinched the AFC East with their win.
2001	Tie 1–1	Dolphins; 30–10	Patriots; 20–13	Dolphins; 44–29	Tom Brady makes his debut in the series. Both teams finished with 11–5 records, but the Patriots clinched the AFC East based on having a better division record. Patriots win Super Bowl XXXVI.
2002	Tie 1–1	Dolphins; 26–13	Patriots; 27–24 (OT)	Dolphins; 45–30	Patriots open Gillette Stadium. Patriots deny Dolphins the AFC East title with their win, but both teams were eliminated later that day following the Jets’ victory. Beginning with that win, the Patriots went on a 21-game home winning streak."
2003	Patriots 2–0	Patriots; 19–13 (OT)	Patriots; 12–0	Dolphins; 45–32	Patriots win Super Bowl XXXVIII.
2004	Tie 1–1	Dolphins; 29–28	Patriots; 24–10	Dolphins; 46–33	2–11 Dolphins defeat 12–1 Patriots in what is dubbed "The Night That Courage Wore Orange". Patriots win Super Bowl XXXIX.
2005	Tie 1–1	Patriots; 23–16	Dolphins; 28–26	Dolphins; 47–34	In New England, Patriots' backup QB Doug Flutie converted a drop kick for an extra point for the first time since the 1941 NFL Championship Game.
2006	Tie 1–1	Dolphins; 21–0	Patriots; 20–10	Dolphins; 48–35	Following their win, the Dolphins went on a 16-game losing streak.
2007	Patriots 2–0	Patriots; 49–28	Patriots; 28–7	Dolphins; 48–37	In Miami, Patriots score their most points in a game against the Dolphins as Tom Brady throws for 6 touchdown passes for the first time in his career. He also finishes with a perfect passer rating (158.3) for the first time in his career. Patriots complete 16–0 regular season. Patriots lose Super Bowl XLII.
2008	Tie 1–1	Patriots; 48–28	Dolphins; 38–13	Dolphins; 49–38	In Miami, Dolphins frequently use the "Wildcat formation" to defeat the Patriots and end their 15-game home winning streak. The formation subsequently gained popularity across the league. Tom Brady did not play in either game due to a season-ending knee injury in the season opener. Both teams finished with 11–5 records, but the Dolphins clinched the AFC East based on having a better conference record, eliminating the Patriots from playoff contention.
2009	Tie 1–1	Dolphins; 22–21	Patriots; 27–17	Dolphins; 50–39	

2010s (Patriots, 14–6)

Season	Season series	at Miami Dolphins	at New England Patriots	Overall series	Notes
2010	Patriots 2–0	Patriots; 41–14	Patriots; 38–7	Dolphins; 50–41	
2011	Patriots 2–0	Patriots; 38–24	Patriots; 27–24	Dolphins; 50–43	In Miami, Patriots finish with 622 total yards, setting a franchise record for most yards in a game. It also set a franchise record for most yards allowed in a game by the Dolphins at the time (broken in 2019). Tom Brady finished with 517 passing yards, the most passing yards in a game in his career and a Patriots' franchise record for most passing yards in a game. It is also a franchise record for most passing yards allowed in a game by the Dolphins. In New England, Patriots overcame a 17–0 third quarter deficit. Patriots lose Super Bowl XLVI.
2012	Patriots 2–0	Patriots; 23–16	Patriots; 28–0	Dolphins; 50–45	
2013	Tie 1–1	Dolphins; 24–20	Patriots; 27–17	Dolphins; 51–46	In New England, Patriots overcame a 17–3 third quarter deficit.
2014	Tie 1–1	Dolphins; 33–20	Patriots; 41–13	Dolphins; 52–47	Patriots win Super Bowl XLIX.
2015	Tie 1–1	Dolphins; 20–10	Patriots; 36–7	Dolphins; 53–48	Dolphins prevent the Patriots from clinching the AFC's #1 seed with their win.
2016	Patriots 2–0	Patriots; 35–14	Patriots; 31–24	Dolphins; 53–50	Patriots win Super Bowl LI.
2017	Tie 1–1	Dolphins; 27–20	Patriots; 35–17	Dolphins; 54–51	Dolphins' win ended the Patriots 14-game road winning streak. Patriots lose Super Bowl LII.
2018	Tie 1–1	Dolphins; 34–33	Patriots; 38–7	Dolphins; 55–52	Patriots win 10 straight home meetings (2009–2018). In Miami, Dolphins win on a lateral pass on the game's final play. Patriots win Super Bowl LIII.
2019	Tie 1–1	Patriots; 43–0	Dolphins; 27–24	Dolphins; 56–53	In Miami, Patriots record their largest victory against the Dolphins with a 43–point differential. Dolphins prevent Patriots from clinching a first-round bye with their win. Game in New England was QB Tom Brady's final regular season game as the Patriots' quarterback.

2020s (Dolphins, 8–5)

Season	Season series	at Miami Dolphins	at New England Patriots	Overall series	Notes
2020	Tie 1–1	Dolphins; 22–12	Patriots; 21–11	Dolphins; 57–54	Dolphins eliminate the Patriots from playoff contention for the first time since the 2008 season with their win.
2021	Dolphins 2–0	Dolphins; 33–24	Dolphins; 17–16	Dolphins; 59–54	Dolphins' first season series sweep against the Patriots since the 2000 season.
2022	Tie 1–1	Dolphins; 20–7	Patriots; 23–21	Dolphins; 60–55	
2023	Dolphins 2–0	Dolphins; 31–17	Dolphins; 24–17	Dolphins; 62–55	Bill Belichick's final season as Patriots head coach.
2024	Dolphins 2–0	Dolphins; 34–15	Dolphins; 15–10	Dolphins; 64–55	
2025	Patriots 2–0	Patriots; 33–27	Patriots; 38–10	Dolphins; 64–57	Patriots lose Super Bowl LX.
2026	Patriots 1–0	Patriots; 24–19	January 9/10	Dolphins; 64–58	

Summary of Results

Season	Season series	at Miami Dolphins	at Boston/New England Patriots	Notes
AFL regular season	Dolphins 4–3	Tie 2–2	Dolphins 2–1	
NFL regular season	Dolphins 60–53	Dolphins 40–16	Patriots 37–19	
AFL and NFL regular season	Dolphins 64–56	Dolphins 42–18	Patriots 38–21	
NFL postseason	Patriots 2–1	Tie 1–1	Patriots 1–0	AFC Wild Card Round: 1982, 1997; AFC Championship: 1985
Regular and postseason	Dolphins 64–58	Dolphins 43–19	Patriots 39–21	Patriots are 1–0 at Tampa Stadium in Tampa (1969), accounted for as a Dolphins' home game.

== Connections between the teams ==
=== Coaches/executives ===
Name	Dolphins' tenure	Patriots' tenure
Josh Boyer	Defensive pass game coordinator/Cornerbacks coach, 2019; Defensive coordinator, 2020–2023	Defensive assistant, 2006–2008; Defensive backs coach, 2009–2011; Cornerbacks coach, 2012–2018
Dom Capers	Defensive coordinator, 2006–2007	Special assistant and secondary coach, 2008
Brian Daboll	Offensive coordinator, 2011	Defensive assistant, 2000–2001; Wide receivers coach, 2002–2006; Tight ends coach, 2013–2016
Dave DeGuglielmo	Offensive line coach, 2009–2011, 2017, 2019 (asst)	Offensive line coach, 2014–2015
Brian Flores	Head coach, 2019–2021	Scouting assistant, 2004–2005; Pro scout, 2006–2007; Special teams assistant, 2008–2009; Assistant offense & special teams, 2010; Defensive assistant, 2011; Safeties coach, 2012–2015; Linebackers coach, 2016–2018; Defensive play-caller, 2018
George Godsey	Tight ends coach, 2019–present Co-offensive coordinator, 2021	Offensive assistant, 2011; Tight ends coach, 2012–2013
Patrick Graham	Defensive coordinator, 2019	Coaching assistant, 2009; Defensive assistant, 2010; Defensive line coach, 2012–2013; Linebackers coach, 2014–2015
Chris Grier	Area scout, 2000–2002; National scout/assistant director of college scouting, 2003–2007; Director of college scouting, 2007–2015; General manager, 2016–present	Intern, 1994; Regional scout, 1995–1999
Chad O'Shea	Offensive coordinator, 2019	Wide receivers coach, 2009–2018
Jerry Schuplinski	Assistant quarterbacks coach, 2019	Offensive assistant, 2013–2015; Assistant quarterbacks coach, 2016–2018

=== Players ===
Name	Position(s)	Dolphins' tenure	Patriots' tenure
Will Allen	Cornerback	2006–2011	2012
Danny Amendola	Wide receiver	2018	2013–2017
Jake Bailey	Punter	2023–present	2019–2022
Braxton Berrios	Wide receiver	2023–2024	2018
Pharaoh Brown	Tight end	2025	2023
Brandon Bolden	Running back/special teamer	2018	2012–2017, 2019–2021
Jacoby Brissett	Quarterback	2021	2016, 2024
Nick Buoniconti	Linebacker	1969-1974, 1976	1962-1968
Adam Butler	Defensive tackle	2021	2017–2020
Keith Byars	Fullback/tight end	1993–1996	1996 1997
Justin Coleman	Cornerback	2021	2015–2016
Bryan Cox	Linebacker	1991-1995	2001
A.J. Derby	Tight end	2017–2018	2015–2016
Trey Flowers	Linebacker	2022	2015–2018, 2023
Isaiah Ford	Wide receiver	2017–2020, 2020–2021	2020
Tony Franklin	Place kicker	1988	1984-1987
Jonathan Freeny	Linebacker	2011–2014	2015–2016, 2017
Irving Fryar	Wide receiver	1993–1995	1984–1992
Jabar Gaffney	Wide receiver	2012	2006-2008, 2012*
Davon Godchaux	Defensive tackle	2017–2020	2021–2024
Mike Gesicki	Tight end	2018–2022	2023
Brandon Gibson	Wide receiver	2013–2014	2015*
Chasen Hines	Guard	2023–present	2022
Mack Hollins	wide receiver	2019–2021	2025–present
Damon Huard	Quarterback	1997-2000	2001-2003
Larry Izzo	Special teamer	1996–2000	2001–2008
Matthew Judon	linebacker	2025–present	2021–2023
Ted Larsen	Guard	2017–2018	2010
Jeron Mastrud	Tight end	2010–2012	2010*
Jason McCourty	Cornerback	2021	2018–2020
Raekwon McMillan	Linebacker	2018–2019	2022–2024
Sony Michel	Running back	2022	2018–2020
Lamar Miller	Running back	2012–2015	2020*
Sammy Morris	Running back	2004–2006	2007–2010
Calvin Munson	Linebacker	2019–2021, 2021–2022, 2023	2018–2019, 2021, 2022–2023
DeVante Parker	Wide receiver	2015–2021	2022–2023
Eric Rowe	Cornerback	2019–2022	2016–2018
Junior Seau	Linebacker	2003–2005	2006–2009
Jonnu Smith	Tight end	2024	2021–2022
Marcus Thigpen	Running back	2012–2013	2014*
Kyle Van Noy	Linebacker	2020	2016–2019, 2021
Wes Welker	Wide receiver	2004–2006	2007–2012

== See also ==
- List of NFL rivalries
- AFC East
- Celtics–Heat rivalry
