= Boston Ski and Sports Club =

For profit sports club

Logo for the Boston Ski and Sports Club

The Boston Ski and Sports Club (BSSC) is a for-profit organization founded in 1967 in Boston, Massachusetts. The club offers sports leagues, ski/snowboard programs, and travel to certain ski resort destinations to other countries. Bus transportation is also provided for skiing and snowboarding events.

== Membership ==
Going on events hosted by the club does not require a membership, but it does offer one which provides discounts. There is a membership fee of $65.

== Sports offered ==
The BSSC offers several sports such as skiing, snowboarding, volleyball, softball, soccer, flag football, floor hockey, field hockey, dodgeball, and basketball.
