= Spurs–Suns rivalry =

National Basketball Association rivalry

- Spurs and Suns warm-up prior to tip-off, November 8, 2006

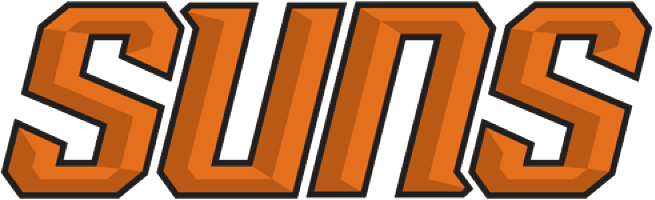
- San Antonio Spurs Phoenix Suns
- First meeting: October 27, 1976; Spurs 115, Suns 106
- Latest meeting: November 9, 2026; Spurs 122, Suns 96
- Next meeting: March 29, 2027

Statistics
- Total meetings: 245
- All-time series: 131–114 (SAS)
- Regular season series: 106–92 (SAS)
- Postseason results: 25–22 (SAS)
- Longest win streak: SAS W9; PHX W9
- Current win streak: SAS W3

Postseason history
- 1992 Western Conference First Round: Suns won, 3–0; 1993 Western Conference Semifinals: Suns won, 4–2; 1996 Western Conference First Round: Spurs won, 3–1; 1998 Western Conference First Round: Spurs won, 3–1; 2000 Western Conference First Round: Suns won, 3–1; 2003 Western Conference First Round: Spurs won, 4–2; 2005 Western Conference Finals: Spurs won, 4–1; 2007 Western Conference Semifinals: Spurs won, 4–2; 2008 Western Conference First Round: Spurs won, 4–1; 2010 Western Conference Semifinals: Suns won, 4–0

Locations of the San Antonio Spurs and Phoenix Suns.

The Spurs–Suns rivalry is a National Basketball Association (NBA) rivalry between the San Antonio Spurs and Phoenix Suns. It began in the 1990s, when the Spurs were led by David Robinson, and the Phoenix Suns were propelled by a number of players, including Dan Majerle, Kevin Johnson, and Tom Chambers. The rivalry continued into the 2000s with Tim Duncan and Steve Nash leading the Spurs and the Suns respectively. The rivalry has also allegedly prevented Spurs coach Gregg Popovich from coaching the USA Basketball team in the 2008 Summer Olympics.

== 1990s ==
The Spurs and Suns first met in the first round of the 1992 NBA Playoffs. The Suns established a record of 53–29 garnering fourth seed in the Western Conference, while the Spurs, owning a 47–35 record, clinched the fifth seed. An injury to team captain David Robinson left the Spurs shorthanded, and the Suns swept the best-of-five series.

The two teams would meet again the next year in the 1993 Western Conference Semifinals. The Suns had a new look having acquired former Celtic Danny Ainge. They also traded Jeff Hornacek, Andrew Lang, and Tim Perry to the Philadelphia 76ers for Charles Barkley, who was the season's Most Valuable Player. The Suns also compiled a league-best 62–20 record and clinched both the Pacific Division title and the top seed in the Western Conference. The Spurs finished the regular season with a 49–33 record and the fifth seed. The Suns managed to reach the Conference Semifinals by beating the Los Angeles Lakers in a five-game series after having lost the first two games. The Spurs ousted the defending Western Conference champion Portland Trail Blazers in four games. The semifinal series lasted six games with the Suns prevailing over the Spurs again when Barkley hit a game-winner in Game 6. The Suns would proceed to win the Western Conference championship and face the Chicago Bulls in the 1993 NBA Finals, where they would lose in six games, with a John Paxson game-winning three to seal a third consecutive championship for Chicago.

Three years later the two rivals met again. The Spurs finished that year with a record of 59–23, the Midwest Division title, and the second seed in the Western Conference. The Suns, in contrast, just made the playoffs with a 41–41 record and the seventh seed. The Spurs won the first two games at home and won the second of two games at Phoenix, winning the series 3–1. The Spurs would go on to face the Utah Jazz, where they lost in six games. The Suns would trade Barkley to the Houston Rockets for Sam Cassell, Robert Horry, Mark Bryant, and Chucky Brown.

During the 1997 offseason, the Spurs, who finished with the third worst record in the league (David Robinson and Sean Elliott had both suffered injuries which kept them out of the lineup for extended periods) won the 1997 NBA Draft Lottery and, in the subsequent draft, selected consensus All-American Tim Duncan from Wake Forest University.

In 1998 the Spurs met Suns in the first round of the Western Conference Playoffs. The Suns were seeded number 4 and the Spurs seeded number 5. The Spurs would win the series 3–1 in Tim Duncan's rookie year. The Spurs would lose to Utah 4–1 in the Western Conference Semifinals.

This marked another major turning point in the rivalry as the Spurs would win three of the next four playoff matchups against the Suns.

The Spurs and Suns have met 10 times in the playoffs. All of these meetings occurred from 1992 onwards. The Spurs have won 6 series and the Suns have won 4.

== 2000s ==
The rivalry went to a new level in this decade, because the Spurs and Suns met several times in the playoffs. The only Spurs series losses to the Suns occurred in the 2000 NBA playoffs, when Duncan was out with a knee injury and in the 2010 NBA playoffs, when the Suns put up the first 4–0 sweep in this rivalry.

The Spurs took the first round of the 2003 series from the Suns in six games on their way to their second NBA title.

The two teams met in the 2005 Western Conference Finals. The revived Suns (who had posted the third-greatest turnaround in NBA history that season) went up against the second-seeded Spurs. San Antonio took home the bragging rights as they easily won in 5 games on their way to their third NBA title.

=== 2007 NBA Playoffs ===
The Spurs and the Suns met in 2007 NBA playoffs in a heated second-round series that many later described as having been "the real finals."

- Game 1 was played on May 6 at the US Airways Center in downtown Phoenix. The Spurs won 111–106. Late in the fourth quarter, Steve Nash bumped heads with Tony Parker, who had possession of the ball. Nash sustained a deep cut on his nose that bled profusely for the remainder of the game. His nose was bandaged and tended to by the team trainer, but Nash was in and out of the game as the wound continued to bleed through the bandages. It was the first time this postseason that Nash did not record a double-double. Tim Duncan and Tony Parker led the Spurs with 32 and 33 points, respectively. Nash led the Suns with 31 points, while Amar'e Stoudemire scored 20 and pulled down 13 boards.
- Game 2 was played May 8 at the US Airways Center. The Suns blew out the Spurs 101–81 to even the series at one game apiece. Mike D'Antoni's decision to have Kurt Thomas guard Tim Duncan helped Amar'e Stoudemire focus on offense, scoring 21 of his 27 points in the second half. Tim Duncan scored 29 points while Tony Parker and Bruce Bowen both had 13 points.
- Game 3 was played on May 12 in San Antonio. The Spurs beat the Suns 108–101 as Tim Duncan rallied for 33 points and 19 boards. Manu Ginobili got a bloodied and bruised eye when he collided with Shawn Marion. The Spurs then led the series 2–1.
- Game 4 was played on May 14 in San Antonio. The Suns trailed by as many as 11 points throughout the third quarter. The Suns took the lead near the end of the fourth quarter when Steve Nash fed Stoudemire to make the game 100–97. Then came the foul that "nudged the Spurs–Suns rivalry from friendly toward cantankerous." Robert Horry knocked Nash into the scorer's table at mid-court. Raja Bell left the bench area and was given a technical foul. Horry was charged with a flagrant foul and ejected. The Suns won 104–98, knotting the series at 2–2. Nash finished the game with 24 points and 15 assists.

On May 15, the NBA announced that Horry would be suspended two games for the flagrant foul against Nash and striking Bell's shoulder. Amar'e Stoudemire and Boris Diaw were also suspended one game each for leaving their bench during the altercation. Coach D'Antoni was not happy with Stoudemire and Diaw's suspension saying the next morning after the teams workout: “We have the most powerful microscopes and telescopes in the world in Arizona, and you could use those instruments and not find a shred of fairness or common sense in that decision. That's kind of how it feels. It really benefits no one. It doesn't benefit us, obviously. It doesn't benefit the Spurs. It doesn't benefit the fans. It doesn't benefit the NBA." Some observers also pointed out that Tim Duncan and Bruce Bowen also left the bench during an altercation in the second quarter, they were however, not suspended or disciplined in any manner.

- Game 5 was played May 16 at the US Airways Center. After leading by as many as 16 points in the second quarter and ahead 79–71 with 5:18 to play, Bruce Bowen hit a three-pointer with 36.4 seconds to go ahead and the Suns lost the game 88–85. The Suns, without Stoudemire and Diaw because of the aforementioned one-game suspension, were led by Shawn Marion who scored 24 points and collected 17 rebounds; all but four of those points were scored in the second half. Kurt Thomas, playing in place of Stoudemire, had 15 points and 12 rebounds. Steve Nash finished with 19 points and 12 assists. Manu Ginobili scored 15 of his 26 points in the final quarter to lead the Spurs to the late rally as the Suns ran out of energy down the stretch.
- Game 6 was played May 18 in San Antonio, Texas. Phoenix started the game matching the Spurs shot for shot. After trailing at halftime 53–51, Phoenix believed that they were going to force a Game 7 back in Phoenix, but a big third quarter by San Antonio put the Spurs up by as many as 20. In the fourth quarter, the Suns rallied by starting to hit big shots. But in the end, it was not enough as San Antonio ousted the Suns 114–106 en route to their fourth NBA championship.

The series would later be mired in controversy due to one of the referees involved with that series, Tim Donaghy, being involved with a betting scandal that was announced after the playoffs. He would admit that the series had very poor officiating involved from the beginning of the series to the end of it. He would also state in a book that Donaghy would release in 2009 that his group supervisor during the series, Tommy Nuñez, had a huge dislike over Suns owner Robert Sarver and a growing love for the culture San Antonio had, to the point where he wanted to make sure the Spurs continued their playoff run that year.

=== 2007–2008 NBA Season ===
The newly revamped Suns saw the rivalry in 2008 evolve into a struggle between two of the NBA's dominant big men, Tim Duncan and Shaquille O'Neal. In the final regular season game of the year between the two teams held on April 9, 2008 in San Antonio, Amare Stoudemire set a screen for Steve Nash on Bruce Bowen with a little over a minute to play when Bowen threw an elbow in Amare Stoudemire's chest. Amare had to be restrained by teammates and coaching staff, while Bruce Bowen took a seat on the bench. The Suns eventually went on to win the game 96–79 and the season series by a count of 3 games to 1.

=== 2008 NBA Playoffs ===
The Suns and Spurs met again in the 2008 NBA playoffs. Anticipation of the renewal of the rivalry was high. “The Phoenix–San Antonio matchup is going to be an absolute bloodbath,” said the Houston Rockets' Shane Battier.

- In Game 1, the Spurs won 117–115 at home in double overtime. After Michael Finley hit a three-pointer to send the game into overtime, Duncan had to hit his only three-pointer of the entire season to send the game into the second overtime, and Ginobili hit a lay-up with 1 second remaining to win the game. Phoenix had let an invaluable opportunity to take the home-court advantage away from the Spurs slip away.
- Throughout the series, the Spurs made extensive use of the controversial Hack-a-Shaq defense, where they used bench players to intentionally foul the notoriously poor free-throw shooter Shaquille O'Neal to shoot free throws. Coach Greg Popovich used the strategy extensively in Game 5 of the series. "Spurs coach Gregg Popovich had his players intentionally foul O'Neal, a 52% career free-throw shooter, throughout the game. He finished 9-of-20 from the line, dropping the Suns to 20-of-37 total on free throws." The Suns were eliminated from the playoffs in a 92–87 Spurs win.

In May 2008, ESPN.com columnist John Hollinger named the Spurs Hack-a-Shaq use as the "Best Tactic" of the first two rounds of the 2008 NBA Playoffs. Hollinger wrote that Popovich was the "first to really master how to use this weapon to his advantage." He explained that Popovich used the tactic "to eliminate 3-point attempts" and with 25 seconds or less at the end of quarters to get the ball back for the Spurs to gain the last possession. Hollinger stated "This should be a Eureka! moment for other coaches, and I expect it will be the league's most widely copied tactic next year."

=== 2010 NBA Playoffs ===
After eliminating the number 2 seeded Dallas Mavericks, the Spurs qualified to the Western Conference Semifinals to meet the number 3 seeded Suns. It marked the 3rd time in 4 years the teams would meet in the playoffs. Steve Nash led the Suns with 33 points and 10 assists for a Game 1 victory, 111–102. Amar'e Stoudemire led the Suns with 23 points and 11 rebounds as the Suns defend home-court advantage and go up 2–0 over the Spurs. The Suns won Game 3 110–96 with Goran Dragić scoring 23 of his 26 points in the fourth quarter to take a 3–0 lead in the series. Suns also went in to sweep the Spurs in 4–0 with Nash scoring 20 points with 10 of them being scored when his right eye was swollen shut.

== Gregg Popovich and Team USA basketball ==
The managing director of Team USA basketball is Jerry Colangelo. Colangelo is the past Chief Executive Officer (CEO) of the Phoenix Suns and is in charge of hiring the coach for the national team that represents the United States in world competitions, including the Olympics. Popovich had a long history working with Team USA when he was in the military and as an assistant to Larry Brown when he was the coach of the 2004 Olympic basketball team. Colangelo chose Duke coach Mike Krzyzewski. Despite Popovich's stated desire to coach the 2008 team, Colangelo suggested publicly that Popovich wasn't as enthusiastic about the job as Duke's coach, that he didn't seem to want it as badly. These statements infuriated the Spurs coach to the point that he wrote an open letter to the league stating his desire to coach the team, and led many to speculate that the motivation for Colangelo's decision was that "the Spurs–Suns rivalry precluded Colangelo from truly considering Popovich for the job."

== LaMarcus Aldridge free agency ==
In July 2015, one of the biggest free agent signings of the 2015–16 season, power forward LaMarcus Aldridge of the Portland Trail Blazers, allowed for meetings with contending and potentially improving teams in the league. One of the first meetings Aldridge had during the beginning of free agency was with the Spurs. With San Antonio, they not only resigned key players in 2014 NBA Finals MVP Kawhi Leonard and Danny Green to long-term contracts and confirmed Tim Duncan would return for the 2015–16 San Antonio Spurs season, but they were also motivated to trade Tiago Splitter to the Atlanta Hawks in order to shed salary to sign Aldridge to a maximum contract. Not too long afterward, Phoenix had their own meeting with Aldridge. While many reporters initially thought the Suns were dark horse candidates to woo Aldridge, recent moves like the addition of Tyson Chandler and a trade where they moved small forwards Marcus Morris, Danny Granger, and Reggie Bullock to the Detroit Pistons helped the Suns out in their pursuit to open up some cap space to sign Aldridge. Between their recent moves and the presentation the Suns gave to LaMarcus on July 1 (which included the aforementioned Tyson Chandler and Aldridge's former teammate Earl Watson), it helped get the Suns from being a longshot candidate to competing with the Spurs as the main candidates for the rights to sign LaMarcus Aldridge. On July 3, 2015, Spurs coach Gregg Popovich met with Aldridge for a personal second meeting with the team, which included lunch together. That turned out to be one of the deciding factors moving forward to where LaMarcus decided to sign a four-year, $80 million deal to play with the Spurs moving forward on the Fourth of July. On a June 28, 2016 episode of Adrian Wojnarowski's podcast Vertical Pod with Woj, Suns general manager Ryan McDonough remarked that an Aldridge meeting with Pat Riley in Miami may have inadvertently led to Aldridge's final decision.

== Season-by-season results ==
San Antonio Spurs vs. Phoenix Suns Season-by-Season Results
1970s (Tie, 7–7)

| Season | Season series | | at San Antonio Spurs | at Phoenix Suns | Overall series | Notes |
|---|---|---|---|---|---|---|
| 1976–77 | Spurs | 3–1 | Spurs, 2–0 | Tie, 1–1 | Spurs; 3–1 | As part of the merger with the American Basketball Association (ABA), the San Antonio Spurs join the NBA and are placed in the Eastern Conference and the Central Division. |
| 1977–78 | Tie | 2–2 | Tie, 1–1 | Tie, 1–1 | Spurs; 5–3 | On October 31, 1977, Spurs beat the Suns 145–143, their most points scored in a game against the Suns. Meanwhile, it is also the Suns most points scored in a game against the Spurs despite the loss. |
| 1978–79 | Suns | 3–1 | Suns, 2–0 | Tie, 1–1 | Tie; 6–6 | |
| 1979–80 | Tie | 1–1 | Spurs, 1–0 | Suns, 1–0 | Tie; 7–7 | |

1980s (Suns, 26–22)

| Season | Season series | | at San Antonio Spurs | at Phoenix Suns | Overall series | Notes |
|---|---|---|---|---|---|---|
| 1980–81 | Suns | 3–2 | Spurs, 2–1 | Suns, 2–0 | Suns; 10–9 | Spurs move to the Western Conference and the Midwest Division. One game was played on Christmas. |
| 1981–82 | Suns | 4–1 | Tie, 1–1 | Suns, 3–0 | Suns; 14–10 | |
| 1982–83 | Suns | 3–2 | Spurs, 2–1 | Suns, 2–0 | Suns; 17–12 | |
| 1983–84 | Suns | 5–0 | Suns, 2–0 | Suns, 3–0 | Suns; 22–12 | Suns record their first season series sweep against the Spurs. |
| 1984–85 | Spurs | 4–1 | Spurs, 3–0 | Tie, 1–1 | Suns; 23–16 | |
| 1985–86 | Suns | 3–2 | Tie, 1–1 | Suns, 2–1 | Suns; 26–18 | |
| 1986–87 | Spurs | 3–2 | Spurs, 2–1 | Tie, 1–1 | Suns; 28–21 | |
| 1987–88 | Spurs | 3–2 | Spurs, 2–0 | Suns, 2–1 | Suns; 30–24 | |
| 1988–89 | Suns | 3–1 | Tie, 1–1 | Suns, 2–0 | Suns; 33–25 | On April 15, 1989, Suns beat the Spurs 137–91, their largest victory against the Spurs with a 46–point differential. |
| 1989–90 | Spurs | 4–0 | Spurs, 2–0 | Spurs, 2–0 | Suns; 33–29 | Spurs record their first season series sweep against the Suns and finish with a winning record in Phoenix for the first time. |

1990s (Suns, 32–25)

| Season | Season series | | at San Antonio Spurs | at Phoenix Suns | Overall series | Notes |
|---|---|---|---|---|---|---|
| 1990–91 | Spurs | 3–1 | Tie, 1–1 | Spurs, 2–0 | Suns; 34–32 | |
| 1991–92 | Suns | 3–1 | Tie, 1–1 | Suns, 2–0 | Suns; 37–33 | Last season Suns played at Arizona Veterans Memorial Coliseum. |
| 1992 Western Conference First Round | Suns | 3–0 | Suns, 1–0 | Suns, 2–0 | Suns; 40–33 | 1st postseason series. |
| 1992–93 | Suns | 3–1 | Tie, 1–1 | Suns, 2–0 | Suns; 43–34 | Suns open up America West Arena. Suns finish with the best record in the league (62–20). |
| 1993 Western Conference Semifinals | Suns | 4–2 | Spurs, 2–1 | Suns, 3–0 | Suns; 47–36 | 2nd postseason series. Spurs play their final game at HemisFair Arena. Suns go on to lose 1993 NBA Finals. |
| 1993–94 | Suns | 3–1 | Tie, 1–1 | Suns, 2–0 | Suns; 50–37 | Spurs open up Alamodome. |
| 1994–95 | Tie | 2–2 | Spurs, 2–0 | Suns, 2–0 | Suns; 52–39 | Suns win 13 home games in a row against the Spurs. Spurs finish with the best record in the league (62–20). |
| 1995–96 | Spurs | 3–1 | Spurs, 2–0 | Tie, 1–1 | Suns; 53–42 | One game was played on Christmas. |
| 1996 Western Conference First Round | Spurs | 3–1 | Spurs, 2–0 | Tie, 1–1 | Suns; 54–45 | 3rd postseason series. |
| 1996–97 | Suns | 3–1 | Tie, 1–1 | Suns, 2–0 | Suns; 57–46 | |
| 1997–98 | Suns | 3–1 | Tie, 1–1 | Suns, 2–0 | Suns; 60–47 | Tim Duncan makes his debut for the Spurs. |
| 1998 Western Conference First Round | Spurs | 3–1 | Spurs, 2–0 | Tie, 1–1 | Suns; 61–50 | 4th postseason series. |
| 1998–99 | Tie | 2–2 | Tie, 1–1 | Tie, 1–1 | Suns; 63–52 | Spurs finish with the best record in the league (37–13). Spurs win 1999 NBA Finals, their first NBA championship. |
| 1999–2000 | Tie | 2–2 | Tie, 1–1 | Tie, 1–1 | Suns; 65–54 | |

2000s (Spurs, 39–24)

| Season | Season series | | at San Antonio Spurs | at Phoenix Suns | Overall series | Notes |
|---|---|---|---|---|---|---|
| 2000 Western Conference First Round | Suns | 3–1 | Tie, 1–1 | Suns, 2–0 | Suns; 68–55 | 5th postseason series. |
| 2000–01 | Tie | 2–2 | Spurs, 2–0 | Suns, 2–0 | Suns; 70–57 | Spurs finish with the best record in the league (58–24). |
| 2001–02 | Spurs | 3–1 | Spurs, 2–0 | Tie, 1–1 | Suns; 71–60 | Last season Spurs played at Alamodome. |
| 2002–03 | Suns | 3–1 | Tie, 1–1 | Suns, 2–0 | Suns; 74–61 | Spurs open up SBC Center (now known as Frost Bank Center). Spurs finish with the best record in the league (60–22). |
| 2003 Western Conference First Round | Spurs | 4–2 | Spurs, 2–1 | Spurs, 2–1 | Suns; 76–65 | 6th postseason series. Spurs finish with a winning record at Phoenix for the first time since the 1990 season. Spurs go on to win 2003 NBA Finals. |
| 2003–04 | Spurs | 4–0 | Spurs, 2–0 | Spurs, 2–0 | Suns; 76–69 | Spurs' first season series sweep against the Suns since the 1989 season. |
| 2004–05 | Spurs | 2–1 | Spurs, 1–0 | Tie, 1–1 | Suns; 77–71 | Spurs move to the Southwest Division. Suns finish with the best record in the league (62–20). |
| 2005 Western Conference Finals | Spurs | 4–1 | Tie, 1–1 | Spurs, 3–0 | Suns; 78–75 | 7th postseason series. Spurs go on to win 2005 NBA Finals. |
| 2005–06 | Spurs | 3–1 | Spurs, 2–0 | Tie, 1–1 | Suns; 79–78 | Last season Suns held the overall series lead against the Spurs. |
| 2006–07 | Spurs | 2–1 | Spurs, 2–0 | Suns, 1–0 | Tie; 80–80 | |
| 2007 Western Conference Semifinals | Spurs | 4–2 | Spurs, 2–1 | Spurs, 2–1 | Spurs; 84–82 | 8th postseason series. Spurs go on to win 2007 NBA Finals. |
| 2007–08 | Suns | 3–1 | Suns, 2–0 | Tie, 1–1 | Tie; 85–85 | Suns finish with a winning record at San Antonio for the first time since the 1992 Western Conference First Round and the 1983 season in the regular season. |
| 2008 Western Conference First Round | Spurs | 4–1 | Spurs, 3–0 | Tie, 1–1 | Spurs; 89–86 | 9th postseason series. |
| 2008–09 | Spurs | 3–1 | Tie, 1–1 | Spurs, 2–0 | Spurs; 92–87 | One game was played on Christmas. |
| 2009–10 | Suns | 2–1 | Spurs, 1–0 | Suns, 2–0 | Spurs; 93–89 | |

2010s (Spurs, 30–11)

| Season | Season series | | at San Antonio Spurs | at Phoenix Suns | Overall series | Notes |
|---|---|---|---|---|---|---|
| 2010 Western Conference Semifinals | Suns | 4–0 | Suns, 2–0 | Suns, 2–0 | Tie; 93–93 | 10th postseason series. |
| 2010–11 | Spurs | 3–1 | Spurs, 2–0 | Tie, 1–1 | Spurs; 96–94 | |
| 2011–12 | Spurs | 4–0 | Spurs, 2–0 | Spurs, 2–0 | Spurs; 100–94 | Spurs record their 100th win against the Suns. |
| 2012–13 | Spurs | 2–1 | Tie, 1–1 | Spurs, 1–0 | Spurs; 102–95 | Spurs go on to lose 2013 NBA Finals. |
| 2013–14 | Spurs | 3–1 | Spurs, 2–0 | Tie, 1–1 | Spurs; 105–96 | Spurs finish with the best record in the league (62–20). Spurs win 2014 NBA Finals. |
| 2014–15 | Spurs | 3–1 | Spurs, 2–0 | Tie, 1–1 | Spurs; 108–97 | |
| 2015–16 | Spurs | 4–0 | Spurs, 2–0 | Spurs, 2–0 | Spurs; 112–97 | Final season for Spurs' Tim Duncan |
| 2016–17 | Spurs | 2–1 | Spurs, 1–0 | Tie, 1–1 | Spurs; 114–98 | On January 14, 2017, Spurs beat the Suns 108–105 at Mexico City Arena in Mexico City as part of the NBA Global Games. It is accounted as a Suns' home game. |
| 2017–18 | Spurs | 4–0 | Spurs, 2–0 | Spurs, 2–0 | Spurs; 118–98 | On February 7, 2018, Spurs beat the Suns 129–81, their largest victory against the Suns with a 48–point differential. |
| 2018–19 | Spurs | 3–1 | Spurs, 2–0 | Tie, 1–1 | Spurs; 121–99 | Spurs win 11 home games in a row against the Suns. |
| 2019–20 | Spurs | 2–1 | Suns, 1–0 | Spurs, 2–0 | Spurs; 123–100 | On December 14, 2019, Spurs beat the Suns 121–119 in overtime at Mexico City Arena in Mexico City as part of the NBA Global Games. It is accounted as a Suns' home game. One game was played on Martin Luther King Jr. day. Suns record their 100th win against the Spurs. |

2020s (Suns, 14–8)

| Season | Season series | | at San Antonio Spurs | at Phoenix Suns | Overall series | Notes |
|---|---|---|---|---|---|---|
| 2020–21 | Suns | 2–1 | Suns, 2–0 | Spurs, 1–0 | Spurs; 124–102 | Suns win the season series against the Spurs for the first time since the 2009 season. Suns lose 2021 NBA Finals. |
| 2021–22 | Suns | 4–0 | Suns, 2–0 | Suns, 2–0 | Spurs; 124–106 | One game was played on Martin Luther King Jr. day. Suns' first season series sweep against the Spurs since the 1983 season. Suns finish with the best record in the league (64–18). |
| 2022–23 | Suns | 3–0 | Suns, 2–0 | Suns, 1–0 | Spurs; 124–109 | |
| 2023–24 | Spurs | 3–1 | Tie, 1–1 | Spurs, 2–0 | Spurs; 127–110 | First season for Victor Wembanyama. |
| 2024–25 | Suns | 2–1 | Spurs, 1–0 | Suns, 2–0 | Spurs; 128–112 | |
| 2025–26 | Tie | 2–2 | Spurs, 2–0 | Suns, 2–0 | Spurs; 130–114 | Spurs go on to lose 2025 NBA Cup championship game. Spurs lose 2026 NBA Finals. |
| 2026–27 | Spurs | 1–0 | March 29th and 31st, 2027 | Spurs, 1-0 | Spurs; 122–96 | |

Summary of Results

| Season | Season series | | at San Antonio Spurs | at Phoenix Suns | Notes |
|---|---|---|---|---|---|
| Regular season games | Spurs | 105–92 | Spurs, 66–32 | Suns, 60–39 | |
| Postseason games | Spurs | 25–22 | Spurs, 15–8 | Suns, 14–10 | |
| Postseason series | Spurs | 6–4 | Spurs, 3–1 | Tie, 3–3 | Western Conference First Round: 1992, 1996, 1998, 2000, 2003, 2008; Western Conference Semifinals: 1993, 2007, 2010; Western Conference Finals: 2005 |
| Regular and postseason | Spurs | 130–114 | Spurs, 81–40 | Suns, 74–49 | |

== Individual Records ==
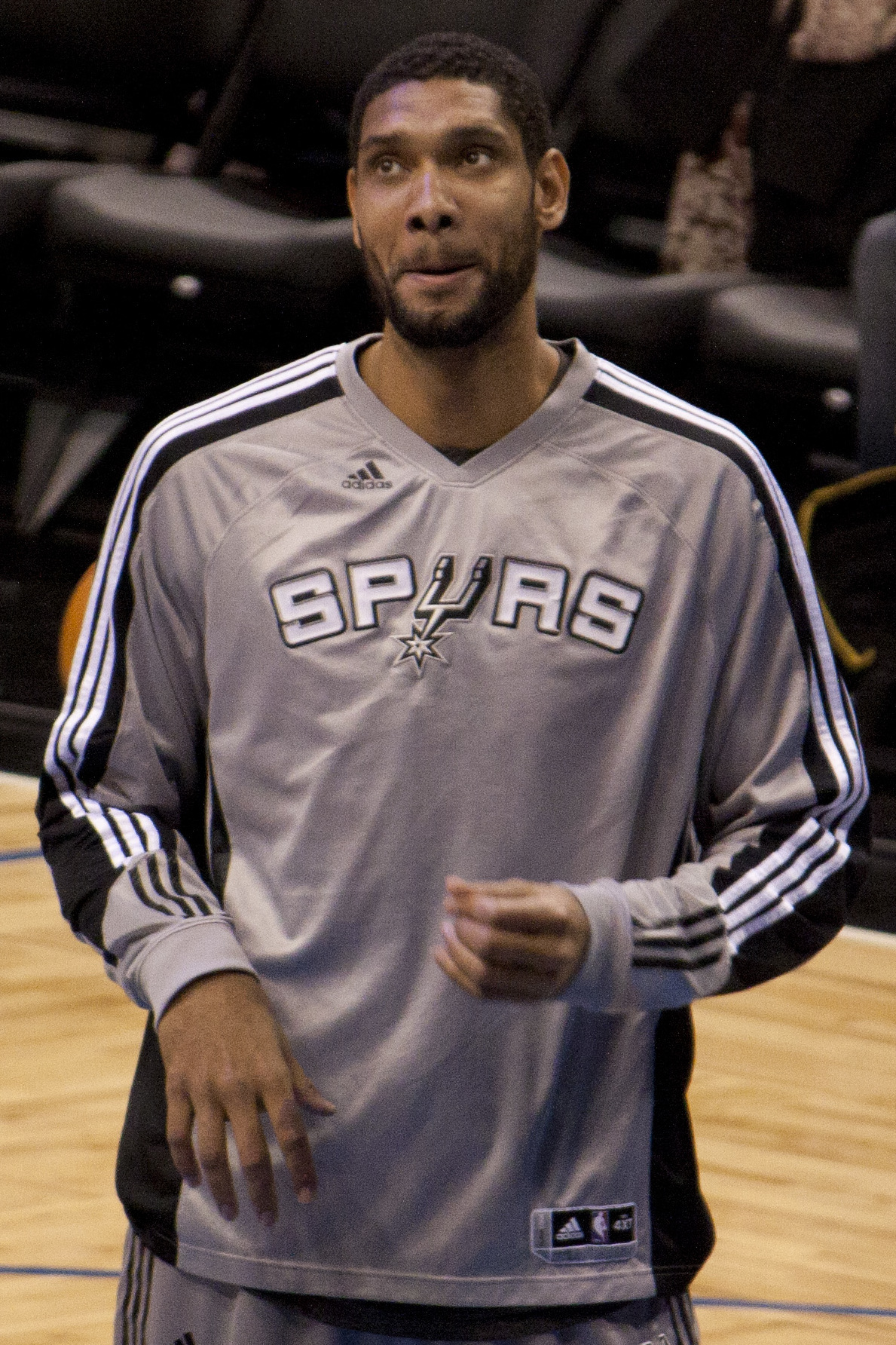
Tim Duncan (21) has scored the most points and played the most games in this rivalry.

=== Top Scorers (Regular Season) ===
Note: Bold denotes active player, italics denotes active player for other teams.

| Rank | Player | Team | Points | GP | PPG |
|---|---|---|---|---|---|
| 1 | Tim Duncan | Spurs | 1,339 | 65 | 20.6 |
| 2 | David Robinson | Spurs | 1,079 | 51 | 21.2 |
| 3 | George Gervin | Spurs | 910 | 36 | 25.3 |
| 4 | Tony Parker | Spurs | 884 | 53 | 16.7 |
| 5 | Walter Davis | Suns | 857 | 42 | 20.4 |
| 6 | Alvan Adams | Suns | 748 | 52 | 14.4 |
| 7 | Manu Ginóbili | Spurs | 623 | 50 | 12.5 |
| 8 | **Devin Booker** | **Suns** | **615** | **26** | **23.7** |
| 9 | Larry Nance | Suns | 576 | 30 | 19.2 |
| 10 | Mike Mitchell | Spurs | 552 | 28 | 19.7 |

==== Per Game (Regular Season, min. 15 GP) ====
1. Charles Barkley (PHX) – **25.6** (15 GP)
2. George Gervin (SAS) – **25.3** (36 GP)
3. Devin Booker (PHX) – **23.7** (26 GP)
4. Amar'e Stoudemire (PHX) – **22.9** (23 GP)
5. Tom Chambers (PHX) – **21.8** (17 GP)

=== Top Scorers (NBA Playoffs) ===
| Rank | Player | Team | Points | GP | PPG |
|---|---|---|---|---|---|
| 1 | Tim Duncan | Spurs | 696 | 30 | 23.2 |
| 2 | Amar'e Stoudemire | Suns | 600 | 25 | 24.0 |
| 3 | Tony Parker | Spurs | 534 | 26 | 20.5 |
| 4 | David Robinson | Spurs | 497 | 23 | 21.6 |
| 5 | Steve Nash | Suns | 435 | 24 | 18.1 |
| 5 | Manu Ginóbili | Spurs | 435 | 26 | 16.7 |

==== Per Game (Playoffs, min. 10 GP) ====
1. Charles Barkley (PHX) – **25.9** (10 GP)
2. Amar'e Stoudemire (PHX) – **24.0** (25 GP)
3. Tim Duncan (SAS) – **23.2** (30 GP)
4. David Robinson (SAS) – **21.6** (23 GP)
5. Tony Parker (SAS) – **20.5** (26 GP)
