= NBA Christmas games =

NBA matchups scheduled on Christmas Day

Games held by the National Basketball Association (NBA) on Christmas Day, December 25, have been an annual tradition since the league's second season in 1947. Since 2008, five games have been played on Christmas each year. Unlike the National Football League (NFL)'s traditional Thanksgiving Day games, the NBA's Christmas Day games have no fixed hosts; rather, they feature some of the best teams and players. Furthermore, the NFL's Thanksgiving Day series features 3 games, rather than 5.

== History ==
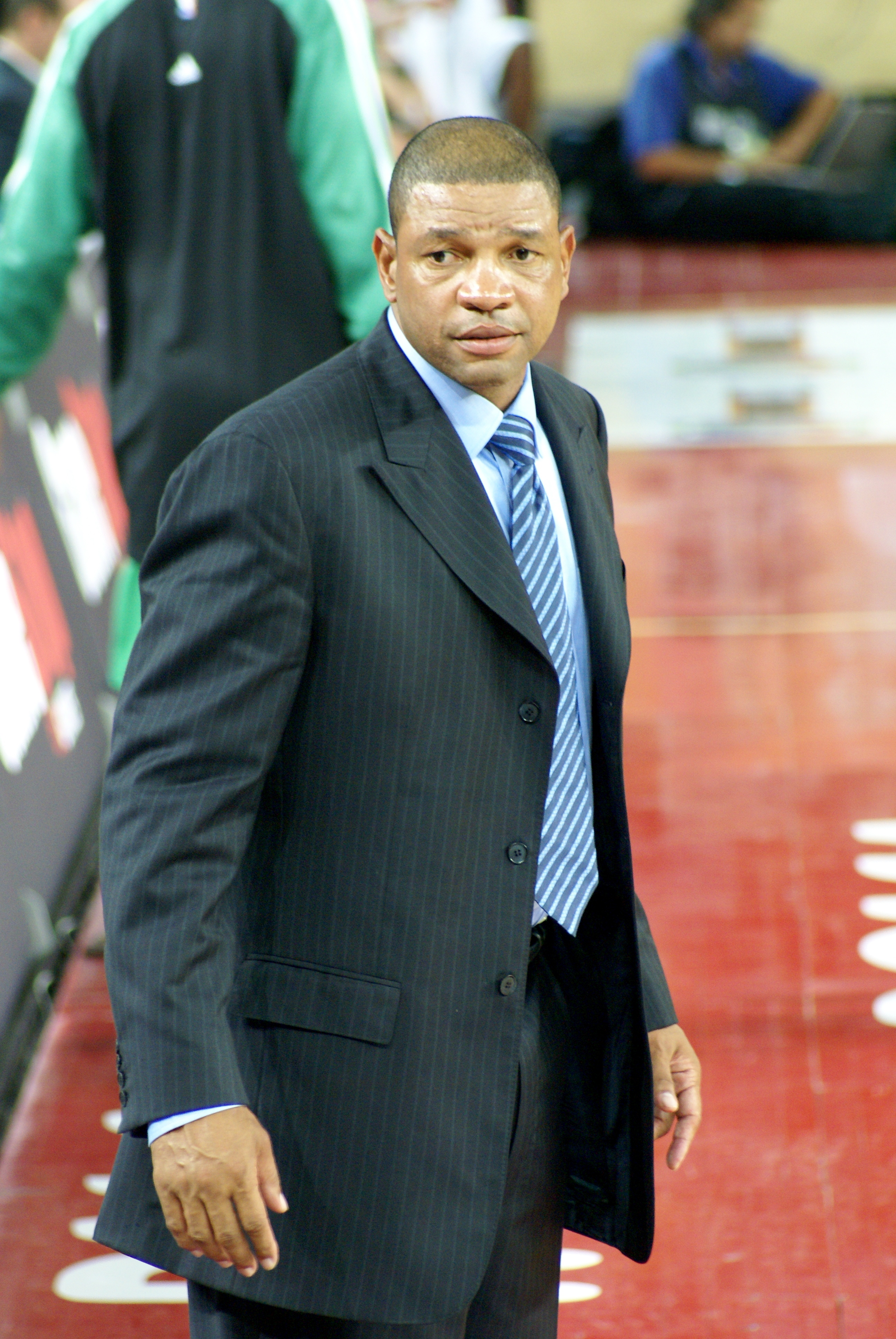
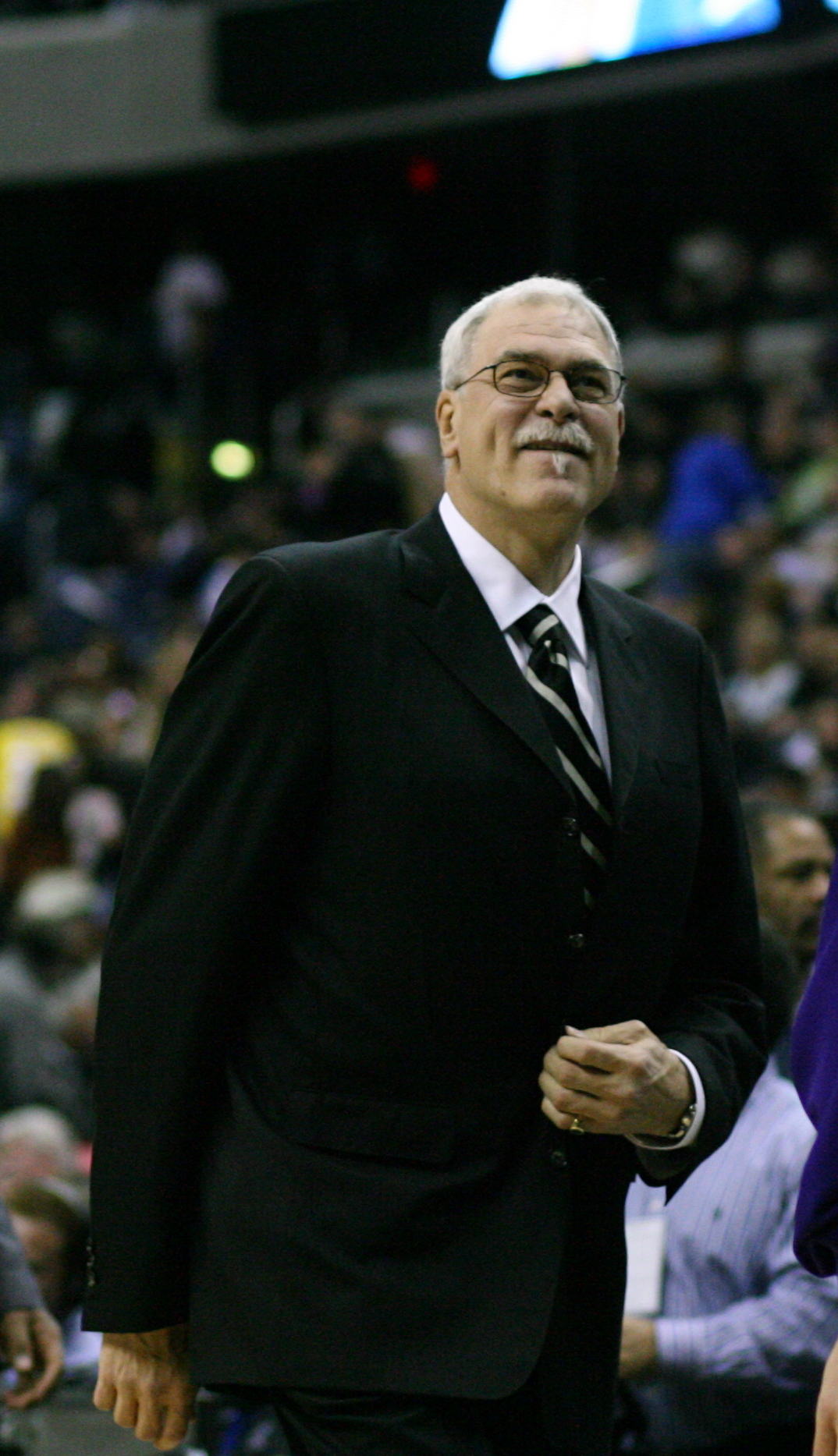
Doc Rivers (left) and Phil Jackson (right) have participated on Christmas Day as both player and coach.

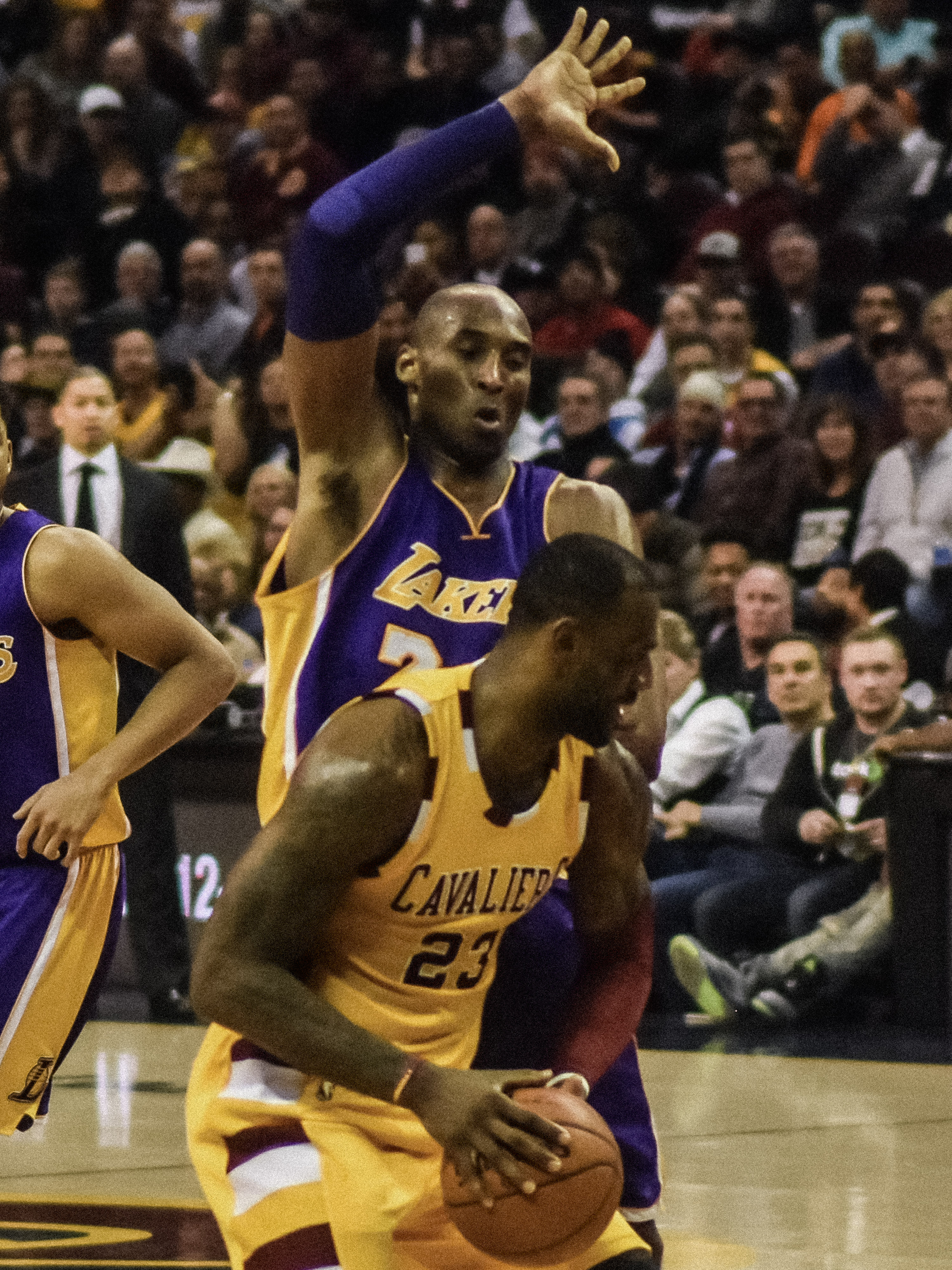
The NBA often schedules showdowns between greatest players on Christmas Day, such as Kobe Bryant and LeBron James (both pictured) in 2009 and 2010.

The first NBA game played on December 25 came in 1947, a year after the NBA's inception, when the New York Knicks beat the Providence Steamrollers at Madison Square Garden 89–75. Since then, the NBA has played games every year on Christmas Day except in 1998 (when a lockout canceled half the 1998–99 season). In contrast, Major League Baseball (MLB) and Major League Soccer (MLS) are in their off-seasons during Christmas, the National Football League (NFL) (prior to 2020) only schedules Christmas games when Christmas falls on the weekend (and even then only schedules games on Christmas occasionally) and the National Hockey League (NHL)'s collective bargaining agreement forbids playing games on Christmas Eve, Christmas Day, and Boxing Day (celebrated as such in Canada as a statutory holiday, though otherwise the non-holiday day after Christmas in the United States; in seasons in which the latter falls on a Saturday, the break occurs one day earlier, from December 23–25). In college football, the only bowl game traditionally scheduled for Christmas has been the defunct Aloha Bowl (and for one year, its replacement, the ESPN Events-owned Hawaii Bowl; that game itself moved its date specifically due to ESPN and ABC's acquisition of NBA telecasts, including Christmas Day games). Thus, the NBA is the only league to regularly schedule games on December 25.

In the early days, regional proximity dictated most of the matchups. Teams would usually play their geographical rivals to cut down on holiday travel and to allow them to have more time with their families. According to Dr. Jack Ramsay, who coached the Portland Trail Blazers from 1976–77 (their only championship season) to 1986, "Christmas meant being at home with the family and having a game we always won. That was a perfect Christmas to me." He set the record for most coaching victories on Christmas Day with 11, an achievement that Phil Jackson later matched in 2008.

In the early 1980s, the New York Knicks put on a show three consecutive seasons. In one game (1984), hall-of-fame forward Bernard King scoring 60 points—the most ever scored by a player on Christmas Day, With the advent of television and the excitement caused by these games, the NBA decided to schedule games over the holiday that showcased the best teams and players.

=== Teams and players ===
While there is no specific system to determine which teams will play the Christmas games, officials from both the NBA and the networks that broadcast the NBA meet during each offseason to plan the schedule of games for the upcoming holiday. The Christmas matchups usually include the teams that played in the previous season's NBA Finals including the current NBA champions since 1995. The NBA also usually tries to feature the league's reigning MVP, as well as the league's other best players. Some examples of this include 2009 and 2010, when the defending champions of those seasons, the Los Angeles Lakers played at home against the Cleveland Cavaliers in 2009 and the Miami Heat in 2010, so that they could have showdowns between Kobe Bryant and LeBron James both times.

The Knicks have played more Christmas Day games than any other team, with 58 total. They are 26-32 on the holiday. Their most recent Yuletide appearance came in 2025 when they defeated the Cleveland Cavaliers, 126-124, at Madison Square Garden. The Knicks have a checkered history on the 25th. Their 26 wins are the most by a team on Christmas Day, but their 32 losses are also the most.

Conversely, the Charlotte Hornets are the only team to have never played on Christmas Day, dating back to the franchise's foundation in 1988 and including their second incarnation as the Charlotte Bobcats from 2004 onward.

The first Christmas Day game to take place outside the United States took place in 2019 when the Boston Celtics defeated the Toronto Raptors 118–102 at Scotiabank Arena in Toronto, Canada.

Some players have participated on Christmas Day as both player and coach. Doc Rivers played with the Knicks in 1992 and coached the Celtics from 2008 to 2013. Phil Jackson, who also participated as a player and coach, has been a part of at least 20 holiday games, coaching on Christmas every year from 1990, with the exception of 1995 and 2004, until his retirement at the end of the 2010–11 season. He won his 1,000th game on Christmas Day in 2008. LeBron James currently holds the record for the most games played on Christmas Day, with 20 games.

Many teams and players that have played on this day have worn special uniforms and sneakers. From 2009 to 2011, the Knicks wore their third jersey, the green/orange alternate which they first used exclusively for St. Patrick's Day. During the game between the Heat and the Lakers in 2010, players on both teams wore holiday sneakers. Bryant, Pau Gasol and Lamar Odom wore lime-green Nike sneakers while James and Chris Bosh wore holiday-red shoes with green laces. From 2008 to 2011, teams playing on Christmas Day wore a patch featuring the NBA logo inside a snowflake. Between 2012 and 2016, the NBA and Adidas produced special uniforms for the Christmas games. All of these uniforms feature a particular theme, such as monochromatic designs ('Big Color') and chrome-treated logos ('Big Logo'). In 2015 and 2016, Stance provided Christmas-themed socks for the games.

After Nike became the uniform provider in 2017, no Christmas-themed uniforms were produced. Instead, NBA teams playing on that day wore either "City" or "Statement" alternate uniforms. During the 2018–19 season, a few teams wore a fifth alternate known as "Earned" uniforms; these were given as a reward for making the 2018 NBA playoffs. In 2023, the snowflake patch returned to the back of the NBA uniforms; however, with the exception of the Miami Heat who wore their "Statement" red uniform, teams playing on that day wore either the primary "Association" or "Icon" uniforms. That trend continued in 2024, except no team wore alternate uniforms on that day. In 2025, the Cleveland Cavaliers and the Dallas Mavericks wore their "Classic" edition uniforms, while the Denver Nuggets wore their "City" uniform.

The Miami Heat have the best highest Christmas Day win percentage.

=== Memorable moments ===
The NBA Christmas Day contests have featured some of the most memorable games ever played. Bernard King scored 60 points for the New York Knicks in 1984. Patrick Ewing helped the Knicks come back to beat the Celtics after trailing by 25 points in 1985. He then beat Michael Jordan and the Bulls on a last-second jumper in 1986. Scottie Pippen performed a last-second block in 1994.

The first showdown featuring Kobe Bryant and Shaquille O'Neal as opponents occurred on Christmas in 2004. 2009 and 2010 featured faceoffs between LeBron James and Kobe Bryant. Phil Jackson becoming the fastest coach to win 1,000 games (it happened on December 25, 2008). In 2021, LeBron James became the all-time Christmas Day scorer with 422 points, surpassing Kobe Bryant, who scored 383 points.

As a result of a lockout in 2011, Christmas Day was also the season opener. ESPN/ABC analyst Jeff Van Gundy talked about that day, saying, "It's a different opening day than has ever happened in the past and Christmas Day games have always been a big day for the NBA. This unique situation combined with the unveiling of a championship banner for the Mavericks in a finals rematch, and then to see the Lakers and the debut of Mike Brown as head coach, those things are all going to be very compelling."

Rivalries have also been showcased during games played on this day. During the 1990s, every Christmas but one featured a game involving either the New York Knicks or the Chicago Bulls, with the two teams playing against each other twice (in the Bulls championship season of 1992–93 and in 1994). They would have met a third time in 1998, if there had not been a lockout. The only year during the 1990s in which neither team played on Christmas Day was during the Bulls first championship season in their second three-peat, in 1995–96. During the 2000s, the NBA showcased the Shaq–Kobe feud. Since 1999, each Christmas has featured games involving either the Celtics or the Lakers, with both teams playing on the holiday in 2002 and every year since 2008. In a great pairing, the two teams faced off against each in other during the first of the Lakers' most recent back-to-back championship seasons of 2008–09. This was the first meeting between the two teams since the finals of the year before.

The home team is 142–75 in Christmas games. The winning percentage of .654 for the home team on Christmas Day is better than the overall winning percentage for home teams during the regular season or the playoffs since 1992.

== Broadcasting ==
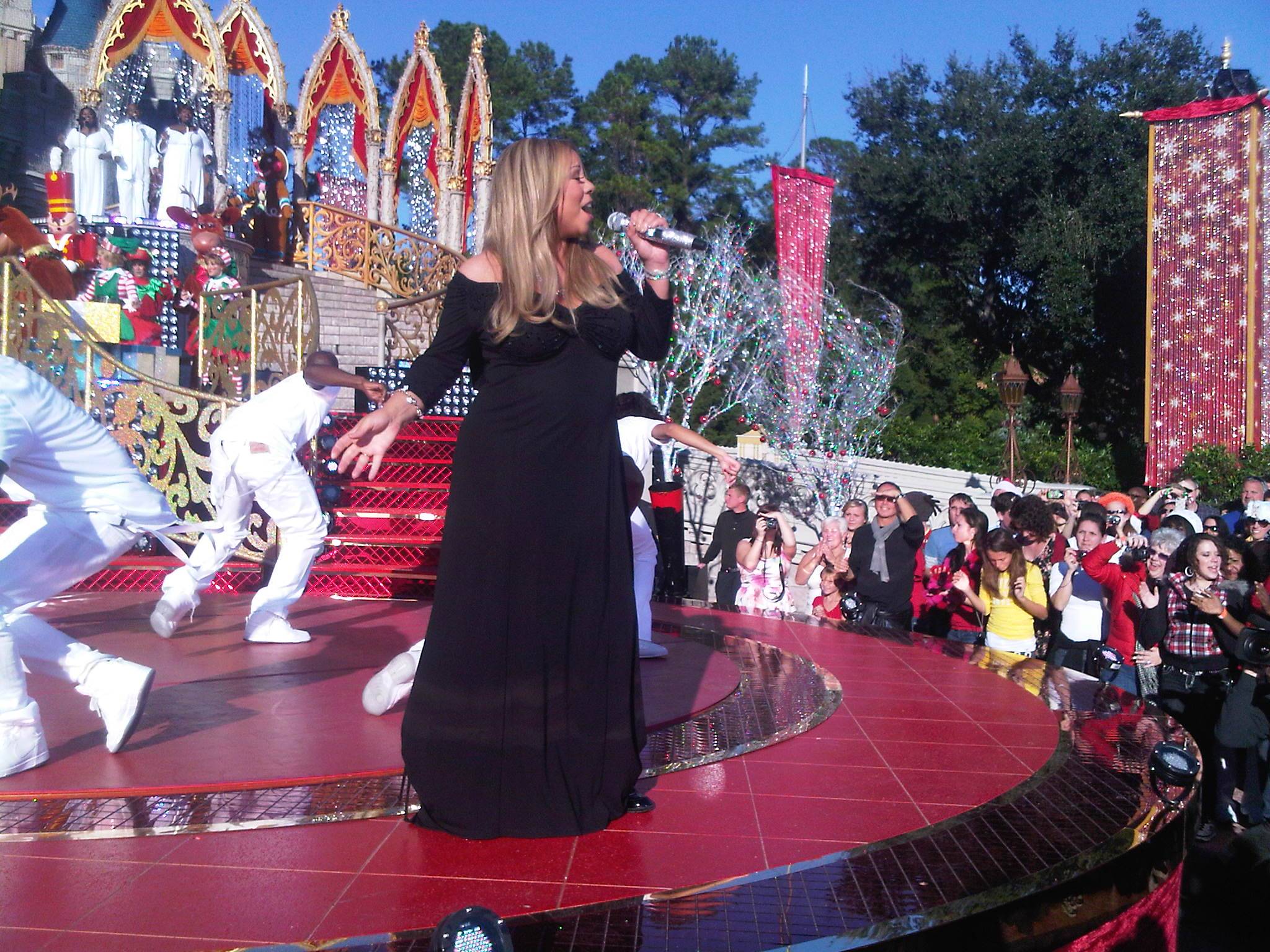
Since 2009, Christmas Day broadcasts of the NBA feature Mariah Carey in a music video singing "All I Want for Christmas Is You" and "Oh Santa!" ("Oh Santa!" since 2010)

The first telecast of an NBA game on Christmas Day dates back to the league's early years. In 1947, the Providence Steamrollers played in New York against the Knicks on WCBS channel 2 at 9 p.m. Eastern Time. Stan Lomax and Bob Edge called that game. Fifteen minutes later, at 8:15 p.m. Central Time, Joe Wilson broadcast the game between Baltimore Bullets and Chicago Stags for WBKB channel 4 in Chicago.

The first nationally televised Christmas Day NBA broadcast occurred in 1967, when ABC broadcast a game between the Los Angeles Lakers and San Diego Rockets from San Diego. Jerry Gross and Jack Twyman called that broadcast for ABC. ABC would continue to televise Christmas Day games through 1972. Chris Schenkel did play-by-play for ABC during this period with the exception of 1970, when Keith Jackson had the honors. Jack Twyman remained in the color commentating position up until 1971, when Bill Russell took over. From 1975-1989 (with the exception of 1982), CBS broadcast a game on Christmas Day.

However, it was not until 1983 that the games became a household tradition, when CBS broadcast the game between the New Jersey Nets and the New York Knicks and ESPN broadcast the game between the Los Angeles Lakers and Portland Trail Blazers (Sam Smith and Dick Vitale were on the call for ESPN). In the 1990s, NBC broadcast a doubleheader each year on Christmas Day (except in 1998, when there were no games played on Christmas Day due to the 1998–99 NBA lockout) and this has continued after ABC took over in 2002, except that in 2004 and 2006, ABC broadcast only one game. For three years (2004–2006), ABC insisted on having a Christmas Day game between the Miami Heat and the Los Angeles Lakers so that Kobe Bryant and Shaquille O'Neal could play against each other. Since ABC took over the NBA, ESPN has also broadcast games on Christmas Day (except in 2006). Since 2009, Christmas Day broadcasts on ESPN and ABC have featured a music video with Mariah Carey singing "All I Want for Christmas Is You." In 2010, Carey added "Oh Santa!"

In 2008, TNT broadcast on Christmas Day for the first time as Marv Albert and Mike Fratello called the game between Washington and Cleveland at Quicken Loans Arena and Kevin Harlan and Reggie Miller called the game between Dallas and Portland at the Rose Garden. This marked the first time that all three networks that cover the NBA (ABC, ESPN, and TNT) produced games on Christmas Day. As Christmas Day fell on a Thursday that year, TNT was given two primetime games as part of their regular TNT NBA Thursday slate (the same scenario also took place in 2014).

Due to the 2011 NBA lockout, the season opener took place on Christmas Day that year. As a result, the NBA gave TNT the first game of the Christmas slate with a contest between the Celtics and Knicks at Madison Square Garden. Calling the game were Marv Albert (himself a former Knicks broadcaster) and Steve Kerr. Because of this, Albert, who was also working for CBS's NFL coverage, was forced to miss his scheduled Week 16 game the day before. Also on that day, ABC broadcast the Dallas Mavericks' 2011 Championship banner ceremony during their pre-game show. This marked the first time in NBA history that a pre-game championship banner ceremony has been aired on a terrestrial television network; either Turner Sports or a regional sports network aired the ceremonies in previous years.

In a unique situation in 2017, ABC aired an NBA tripleheader for the first time ever, which was headlined by a 2017 NBA Finals rematch between LeBron James and the Cavaliers and Stephen Curry, Kevin Durant and the Warriors, which would be the prelude to the 2018 Finals rematch, which resulted in a Warriors sweep. Because ESPN aired Monday Night Football on Christmas night, they only aired one game, which was at 12 ET. TNT aired the 10:30 pm game, TNT's first Christmas Day game since 2014. The game was called by the Inside the NBA crew of Ernie Johnson Jr., Shaquille O'Neal, Kenny Smith and Charles Barkley, marking the first time the Inside the NBA crew called an NBA altogether. This ended up also being the last Christmas Day game broadcast by TNT, as they ended their broadcast of NBA games after the 2025 NBA playoffs. Since 2018, at least one Christmas Day game has been simulcast on both ESPN and ABC.

For 2022, ABC was originally scheduled to air a tripleheader. However, in October 2022, ESPN announced that all five of its Christmas Day games would be simulcast across both ABC and ESPN, likely as an attempt to counterprogram the NFL's scheduling of a Christmas Day tripleheader across CBS, Fox, and NBC. With network programming spanning throughout most of the day, beginning with Good Morning America Weekend (starting at 7:00 am local time) and the Disney Parks Christmas Day Parade (airing across the country at 10:00 am ET), and then NBA coverage stretching from the first tripleheader game (Philadelphia–New York) at noon ET, which also featured an alternate broadcast on ESPN2 hosted by Stephen A. Smith, and was simulcast on ESPN+, to the conclusion of the last game (Phoenix–Denver) after 1:45 am ET early on December 26 (the game went to overtime), some ABC affiliates gave their local news department employees the entire day off.

With Christmas Day falling on a Monday in 2023, the NFL also scheduled a Monday Night Football on that day. Because ABC/ESPN holds the broadcast rights to both NBA Christmas games and Monday Night Football, it was decided that ESPN would again air all five NBA games (ESPN+ would also stream all five games for the first time ever), but ABC would only simulcast two of them (Golden State–Denver at 2:30 pm ET, followed by Boston–LA Lakers at 5 pm ET) in favor of exclusively airing the Monday Night Football game (which was also streamed on ESPN+). This marked the first time since 2016 that ABC televised fewer than three NBA Christmas games. ESPN also simulcast all games on ESPN+ and aired an alternate broadcast for the first game (Milwaukee-New York Knicks at noon ET), hosted by WNBA legends Sue Bird and Diana Taurasi, on ESPN2.

For 2024, it was originally announced that only the middle three of the five Christmas games were going to be ABC/ESPN simulcasts, and the first and last games were only to be televised on ESPN. However, in October 2024, it was announced that all five games will be ABC/ESPN simulcasts like in 2022, in a similar manner of counterprogramming the Netflix-exclusive NFL games. In November 2024, it was further announced that ESPN2, ESPN+, and Disney+ would show an alternate broadcast of the first game, San Antonio Spurs–New York Knicks, titled "Dunk the Halls" that will use Hawk-Eye and other Sony-owned technology to render a live animated version of the contest portrayed by Mickey Mouse universe characters. This marked the first real-time animated NBA game and the first to be streamed on Disney+ in the United States.

In 2025, it was announced that all five Christmas Day games will once again be broadcast on both ABC and ESPN likely to go against an NFL Tripleheader on streaming services Netflix and Prime Video. Inside the NBA would also serve as the studio show for ABC and ESPN's Christmas slate, this following a sublicensing deal between Warner Bros. Discovery (TNT's parent company) and The Walt Disney Company (ESPN and ABC's parent company) that would allow the show to continue airing on various marquee games on ESPN and ABC. Also in 2025, the NBA announced that the "Dunk the Halls" alternate broadcast would return for the first game between the Cleveland Cavaliers and the New York Knicks; this time it will also air on Disney Channel and Disney XD.

== Game results ==
Season	Visiting team	Score	Home team	Score	OT	Significance	Network/Streaming (Note: Nationally televised games only)
1947–48	Chicago Stags	70	Baltimore Bullets	87		First BAA Christmas Day game.	
1947–48	Providence Steamrollers	75	New York Knicks	89			
1947–48	Washington Capitols	73	St. Louis Bombers	56			
1948–49	Chicago Stags	70	New York Knicks	64			
1948–49	Boston Celtics	77	Philadelphia Warriors	80			
1948–49	Baltimore Bullets	88	Providence Steamrollers	83		Bullets enter as the defending BAA champions.	
1948–49	St. Louis Bombers	82	Rochester Royals	90			
1948–49	Fort Wayne Pistons	74	Washington Capitols	88			
1949–50	Philadelphia Warriors	64	Baltimore Bullets	63		First Christmas Day game for the renamed NBA.	
1949–50	Sheboygan Red Skins	76	Denver Nuggets	72			
1949–50	Fort Wayne Pistons	58	Minneapolis Lakers	72		Lakers enter as the defending BAA (NBA) champions.	
1949–50	Boston Celtics	79	Rochester Royals	88			
1949–50	Washington Capitols	81	St. Louis Bombers	68			
1949–50	Anderson Packers	88	Syracuse Nationals	94			
1949–50	Indianapolis Olympians	93	Waterloo Hawks	97			
1950–51	Washington Capitols	79	Minneapolis Lakers	93			
1950–51	New York Knicks	86	Philadelphia Warriors	84	(OT)		
1950–51	Boston Celtics	77	Rochester Royals	90			
1950–51	Fort Wayne Pistons	69	Syracuse Nationals	81			
1950–51	Baltimore Bullets	72	Tri-Cities Blackhawks	87			
1951–52	Syracuse Nationals	70	Milwaukee Hawks	65			
1951–52	Boston Celtics	93	Minneapolis Lakers	100			
1951–52	Fort Wayne Pistons	65	New York Knicks	72		Knicks enter as the defending Eastern division champions.	
1951–52	Indianapolis Olympians	78	Rochester Royals	87		Royals enter as the defending NBA champions.	
1952–53	Milwaukee Hawks	69	Fort Wayne Pistons	71	(2OT)		
1952–53	Indianapolis Olympians	73	Minneapolis Lakers	90		Lakers enter as the defending NBA champions.	
1952–53	Boston Celtics	84	New York Knicks	97			
1952–53	Rochester Royals	93	Philadelphia Warriors	78			
1952–53	Baltimore Bullets	92	Syracuse Nationals	102			
1953–54	Minneapolis Lakers	78	Baltimore Bullets	88		Lakers enter as the defending NBA champions.	
1953–54	Boston Celtics	79	Fort Wayne Pistons	108			
1953–54	Syracuse Nationals	80	New York Knicks	89			
1953–54	Rochester Royals	73	Philadelphia Warriors	65			
1954–55	Boston Celtics	108	Milwaukee Hawks	99			
1954–55	Philadelphia Warriors	91	Minneapolis Lakers	99		Lakers enter as the defending NBA champions.	
1954–55	Syracuse Nationals	101	New York Knicks	109			
1954–55	Fort Wayne Pistons	73	Rochester Royals	80			
1955–56	New York Knicks	87	Fort Wayne Pistons	92			
1955–56	Boston Celtics	115	Minneapolis Lakers	112			
1955–56	Rochester Royals	96	Syracuse Nationals	111		Nationals enter as the defending NBA champions.	
1956–57	Philadelphia Warriors	89	Boston Celtics	82		Warriors enter as the defending NBA champions.	
1956–57	Minneapolis Lakers	100	Fort Wayne Pistons	89			
1956–57	St. Louis Hawks	107	New York Knicks	105	(OT)		
1956–57	Syracuse Nationals	93	Rochester Royals	98			
1957–58	Minneapolis Lakers	106	Detroit Pistons	104			
1957–58	Boston Celtics	105	Philadelphia Warriors	115		Celtics enter as the defending NBA champions.	
1957–58	New York Knicks	130	Syracuse Nationals	134	(OT)		
1958–59	St. Louis Hawks	100	Cincinnati Royals	92		Hawks enter as the defending NBA champions.	
1958–59	Minneapolis Lakers	97	Detroit Pistons	98	(OT)		
1958–59	Boston Celtics	129	New York Knicks	120			
1959–60	Detroit Pistons	103	Cincinnati Royals	121			
1959–60	Boston Celtics	123	New York Knicks	119		Celtics enter as the defending NBA champions.	
1959–60	Syracuse Nationals	121	Philadelphia Warriors	129			
1959–60	Minneapolis Lakers	96	St. Louis Hawks	112		Hawks enter as the defending Western division champions.	
1960–61	Detroit Pistons	119	Cincinnati Royals	126			
1960–61	New York Knicks	100	Syracuse Nationals	162			
1961–62	Detroit Pistons	97	Chicago Packers	118		The Wizards franchise's first NBA Christmas Day game.	
1961–62	Los Angeles Lakers	141	Cincinnati Royals	127			
1961–62	Philadelphia Warriors	135	New York Knicks	136	(2OT)		
1961–62	Boston Celtics	127	Syracuse Nationals	122		Celtics enter as the defending NBA champions.	
1962–63	Detroit Pistons	120	Cincinnati Royals	131			
1962–63	Syracuse Nationals	123	New York Knicks	111			
1962–63	St. Louis Hawks	91	San Francisco Warriors	94			
1963–64	St. Louis Hawks	107	Cincinnati Royals	113			
1963–64	Los Angeles Lakers	134	New York Knicks	126			
1964–65	Detroit Pistons	106	Boston Celtics	118		Celtics enter as the defending NBA champions.	
1964–65	St. Louis Hawks	125	Cincinnati Royals	130	(OT)		
1964–65	Baltimore Bullets	114	New York Knicks	108			
1965–66	Boston Celtics	113	Baltimore Bullets	99		Celtics enter as the defending NBA champions.	
1965–66	San Francisco Warriors	113	Cincinnati Royals	119			
1965–66	Detroit Pistons	106	Los Angeles Lakers	115			
1965–66	St. Louis Hawks	131	New York Knicks	111			
1966–67	Detroit Pistons	129	Baltimore Bullets	127	(OT)		
1966–67	San Francisco Warriors	124	Cincinnati Royals	112			
1966–67	Chicago Bulls	132	New York Knicks	133		Bulls–Knicks rivalry	
1967–68	Philadelphia 76ers	108	Baltimore Bullets	105		76ers enter as the defending NBA champions.	
1967–68	Seattle SuperSonics	112	Cincinnati Royals	118		SuperSonics' first Christmas Day game	
1967–68	Boston Celtics	134	New York Knicks	124			
1967–68	Los Angeles Lakers	101	San Diego Rockets	104		Rockets' first Christmas Day game; also first nationally televised game (ABC).	ABC
1967–68	Oakland Oaks	98	Kentucky Colonels	112		ABA game	
1968–69	Seattle SuperSonics	112	Baltimore Bullets	118			
1968–69	Chicago Bulls	98	Cincinnati Royals	103			
1968–69	Detroit Pistons	119	Milwaukee Bucks	113		Bucks' first Christmas Day game	
1968–69	Philadelphia 76ers	109	New York Knicks	110			
1968–69	Los Angeles Lakers	119	Phoenix Suns	99		Suns' first Christmas Day game. Lakers enter as the defending Western division champions.	ABC
1968–69	Minnesota Pipers	129	Kentucky Colonels	118		ABA game	
1968–69	Oakland Oaks	127	Los Angeles Stars	122		ABA game	
1968–69	Denver Rockets	129	New York Nets	110		ABA game	
1969–70	Philadelphia 76ers	113	Baltimore Bullets	121			
1969–70	San Francisco Warriors	124	Cincinnati Royals	120	(OT)		
1969–70	Detroit Pistons	111	New York Knicks	112			
1969–70	Boston Celtics	116	Phoenix Suns	127		Celtics enter as the defending NBA champions.	ABC
1969–70	Los Angeles Stars	105	Kentucky Colonels	101		ABA game	
1969–70	Washington Caps	131	Pittsburgh Pipers	112		ABA game	
1970–71	Chicago Bulls	112	Baltimore Bullets	128			
1970–71	Cleveland Cavaliers	100	Cincinnati Royals	117			
1970–71	Boston Celtics	113	Los Angeles Lakers	123			
1970–71	Buffalo Braves	102	New York Knicks	115		Braves' first Christmas Day game, Knicks enter as the defending NBA champions.	
1970–71	Detroit Pistons	100	Philadelphia 76ers	105			
1970–71	Atlanta Hawks	115	Phoenix Suns	127			ABC
1970–71	Utah Stars	102	Memphis Pros	107		ABA game	
1970–71	Carolina Cougars	121	Pittsburgh Condors	136		ABA game	
1970–71	Texas Chaparrals	131	Virginia Squires	145		ABA game	
1971–72	Buffalo Braves	117	Atlanta Hawks	140			
1971–72	Boston Celtics	99	Cincinnati Royals	94			
1971–72	Milwaukee Bucks	118	Detroit Pistons	120	(OT)	Bucks enter as the defending NBA champions.	
1971–72	Golden State Warriors	89	New York Knicks	114			
1971–72	Baltimore Bullets	117	Philadelphia 76ers	114		Bullets enter as the defending Eastern Conference champions.	
1971–72	Seattle SuperSonics	86	Phoenix Suns	116			
1971–72	Chicago Bulls	109	Portland Trail Blazers	88			
1971–72	Carolina Cougars	102	Memphis Pros	110		ABA game	
1971–72	Indiana Pacers	129	Utah Stars	150		ABA game	
1971–72	Pittsburgh Condors	126	Virginia Squires	133		ABA game	
1972–73	Milwaukee Bucks	104	Kansas City-Omaha Kings	99			
1972–73	Detroit Pistons	110	New York Knicks	113			
1972–73	Chicago Bulls	108	Phoenix Suns	115			ABC
1972–73	Seattle SuperSonics	113	Portland Trail Blazers	116			
1973–74	Capital Bullets	102	New York Knicks	100		Knicks enter as the defending NBA champions.	
1973–74	Los Angeles Lakers	100	Phoenix Suns	135			
1974–75	Philadelphia 76ers	104	New York Knicks	97			
1974–75	Boston Celtics	96	Phoenix Suns	110		Celtics enter as the defending NBA champions.	
1974–75	Atlanta Hawks	92	Washington Bullets	110			
1974–75	San Diego Conquistadors	100	Utah Stars	112		ABA game	
1975–76	Houston Rockets	99	New Orleans Jazz	101		Jazz's first Christmas Day game	
1975–76	Philadelphia 76ers	103	New York Knicks	111			
1975–76	Kansas City Kings	111	Phoenix Suns	122			CBS
1975–76	Atlanta Hawks	94	Washington Bullets	99		Bullets enter as the defending Eastern Conference champions.	
1976–77	Detroit Pistons	106	Buffalo Braves	115			
1976–77	Chicago Bulls	96	Kansas City Kings	91			CBS
1976–77	Philadelphia 76ers	105	New York Knicks	104			
1976–77	Los Angeles Lakers	96	Phoenix Suns	113			
1976–77	Seattle SuperSonics	95	Portland Trail Blazers	110			
1976–77	Cleveland Cavaliers	99	Washington Bullets	117			
1977–78	Buffalo Braves	105	Cleveland Cavaliers	111			CBS
1977–78	Milwaukee Bucks	131	Kansas City Kings	122			
1977–78	San Antonio Spurs	115	New Orleans Jazz	105			
1977–78	Philadelphia 76ers	110	New York Knicks	113			
1977–78	Golden State Warriors	97	Portland Trail Blazers	109		Trail Blazers enter as the defending NBA champions.	
1977–78	Los Angeles Lakers	111	Seattle SuperSonics	96			
1977–78	Atlanta Hawks	93	Washington Bullets	100			
1978–79	Philadelphia 76ers	109	New York Knicks	94			CBS
1978–79	Golden State Warriors	102	Portland Trail Blazers	115			
1978–79	San Diego Clippers	123	Seattle SuperSonics	118			
1979–80	Detroit Pistons	101	Cleveland Cavaliers	111			
1979–80	New Jersey Nets	102	New York Knicks	131		Knicks–Nets rivalry	
1979–80	Golden State Warriors	91	Portland Trail Blazers	113			
1979–80	Denver Nuggets	111	Utah Jazz	122			
1979–80	Philadelphia 76ers	95	Washington Bullets	92			CBS
1980–81	Boston Celtics	117	New York Knicks	108		Celtics–Knicks rivalry	CBS
1980–81	San Antonio Spurs	111	Phoenix Suns	131		Spurs–Suns rivalry	
1980–81	Golden State Warriors	114	Portland Trail Blazers	115			USA
1980–81	New Jersey Nets	94	Washington Bullets	109			USA
1981–82	New Jersey Nets	96	New York Knicks	95		Knicks–Nets rivalry	
1981–82	Los Angeles Lakers	104	Phoenix Suns	101			CBS
1981–82	Seattle SuperSonics	94	Portland Trail Blazers	99			
1981–82	Indiana Pacers	98	Washington Bullets	115			
1982–83	New Jersey Nets	112	New York Knicks	110	(OT)	Knicks–Nets rivalry	
1982–83	Seattle SuperSonics	88	Portland Trail Blazers	95			
1982–83	Phoenix Suns	111	Utah Jazz	101			
1982–83	Atlanta Hawks	97	Washington Bullets	91			
1983–84	New Jersey Nets	110	New York Knicks	112	(OT)	Knicks–Nets rivalry	CBS
1983–84	Los Angeles Lakers	121	Portland Trail Blazers	141			ESPN
1984–85	Atlanta Hawks	106	Cleveland Cavaliers	109			
1984–85	Philadelphia 76ers	109	Detroit Pistons	108			CBS
1984–85	New Jersey Nets	120	New York Knicks	114		Knicks–Nets rivalry	TBS
1984–85	Golden State Warriors	97	Portland Trail Blazers	106			
1985–86	Boston Celtics	104	New York Knicks	113	(2OT)	Celtics–Knicks rivalry. Celtics enter as the defending Eastern Conference champions.	CBS
1985–86	Los Angeles Clippers	107	Portland Trail Blazers	121			TBS
1986–87	Chicago Bulls	85	New York Knicks	86		Bulls–Knicks rivalry	CBS
1986–87	Washington Bullets	102	Philadelphia 76ers	97		1986 NBA playoffs first round rematch	TBS
1987–88	Detroit Pistons	91	New York Knicks	87			CBS
1987–88	Atlanta Hawks	106	Philadelphia 76ers	100			TBS
1988–89	Washington Bullets	110	Philadelphia 76ers	125			TBS
1988–89	Los Angeles Lakers	87	Utah Jazz	101		Lakers enter as the defending NBA champions. 1988 NBA playoffs second round rematch	CBS
1989–90	Cleveland Cavaliers	104	Atlanta Hawks	115			CBS
1990–91	Detroit Pistons	86	Chicago Bulls	98		Bulls–Pistons rivalry, Pistons enter as the defending NBA champions. 1990 NBA playoffs Eastern Conference Finals rematch	NBC
1991–92	Boston Celtics	99	Chicago Bulls	121		Bulls enter as the defending NBA champions.	NBC
1991–92	Los Angeles Lakers	85	Los Angeles Clippers	75		Lakers–Clippers rivalry. Lakers enter as defending Western Conference champions.	NBC
1992–93	New York Knicks	77	Chicago Bulls	89		Bulls–Knicks rivalry, Bulls enter as the defending NBA champions. 1992 NBA playoffs second round rematch	NBC
1992–93	San Antonio Spurs	103	Los Angeles Clippers	94			NBC
1993–94	Orlando Magic	93	Chicago Bulls	95		Magic's first Christmas game Bulls enter as the defending NBA champions.	NBC
1993–94	Houston Rockets	91	Phoenix Suns	111			NBC
1994–95	New York Knicks	104	Chicago Bulls	107	(OT)	Bulls–Knicks rivalry 1994 NBA playoffs second round rematch	NBC
1994–95	Seattle SuperSonics	96	Denver Nuggets	105		1994 NBA playoffs first round rematch	NBC
1995–96	Houston Rockets	90	Orlando Magic	92		1995 NBA Finals rematch, Rockets enter as the defending NBA champions.	NBC
1995–96	San Antonio Spurs	105	Phoenix Suns	100		Spurs–Suns rivalry	NBC
1996–97	Detroit Pistons	83	Chicago Bulls	95		Bulls–Pistons rivalry, Bulls enter as the defending NBA champions.	NBC
1996–97	Los Angeles Lakers	108	Phoenix Suns	87			NBC
1997–98	Miami Heat	80	Chicago Bulls	90		Bulls enter as the defending NBA champions. 1997 NBA playoffs Eastern Conference Finals rematch	NBC
1997–98	Houston Rockets	103	Utah Jazz	107		Jazz–Rockets rivalry 1997 NBA playoffs Western Conference Finals rematch	NBC
1998–99	Canceled due to the 1998–99 NBA lockout						
1999–2000	New York Knicks	90	Indiana Pacers	101		Knicks–Pacers rivalry, 1999 NBA playoffs Eastern Conference Finals rematch. Knicks enter as the defending Eastern Conference champions.	NBC
1999–2000	San Antonio Spurs	93	Los Angeles Lakers	99		Lakers–Spurs rivalry, 1999 NBA playoffs second round rematch, Spurs enter as the defending NBA champions.	NBC
2000–01	Orlando Magic	93	Indiana Pacers	103			NBC
2000–01	Portland Trail Blazers	109	Los Angeles Lakers	104		2000 NBA playoffs Western Conference Finals rematch., Lakers enter as the defending NBA champions.	NBC
2001–02	Philadelphia 76ers	82	Los Angeles Lakers	88		2001 NBA Finals rematch, Lakers enter as the defending NBA champions.	NBC
2001–02	Toronto Raptors	94	New York Knicks	102		Raptors' first Christmas Day game, 2001 NBA playoffs first round rematch.	NBC
2002–03	Detroit Pistons	99	Orlando Magic	104	(OT)		ESPN
2002–03	Boston Celtics	81	New Jersey Nets	117		2002 NBA playoffs Eastern Conference Finals rematch. Nets enter as defending Eastern Conference champions.	ABC
2002–03	Sacramento Kings	105	Los Angeles Lakers	99		2002 NBA playoffs Western Conference Finals rematch, Lakers enter as the defending NBA champions.	ABC
2003–04	Cleveland Cavaliers	101	Orlando Magic	113	(OT)	LeBron James's first Christmas Day game.	ESPN
2003–04	Dallas Mavericks	111	Sacramento Kings	103		Mavericks' first Christmas Day game, 2003 NBA playoffs second round rematch.	ABC
2003–04	Houston Rockets	99	Los Angeles Lakers	87			ABC
2004–05	Detroit Pistons	98	Indiana Pacers	93		2004 NBA playoffs Eastern Conference Finals rematch, Malice at the Palace rematch, Pistons enter as the defending NBA champions.	ESPN
2004–05	Miami Heat	104	Los Angeles Lakers	102	(OT)	Shaq–Kobe feud. Lakers enter as the defending Western Conference champions.	ABC
2005–06	San Antonio Spurs	70	Detroit Pistons	85		2005 NBA Finals rematch, Spurs enter as the defending NBA champions.	ABC
2005–06	Los Angeles Lakers	92	Miami Heat	97		Shaq–Kobe feud	ABC
2006–07	Los Angeles Lakers	85	Miami Heat	101		Shaq–Kobe feud, Heat enter as the defending NBA champions.	ABC
2007–08	Miami Heat	82	Cleveland Cavaliers	96		Cavaliers enter as the defending Eastern Conference champions.	ABC
2007–08	Phoenix Suns	115	Los Angeles Lakers	122		2007 NBA playoffs first round rematch.	ABC
2007–08	Seattle SuperSonics	79	Portland Trail Blazers	89			ESPN
2008–09	Washington Wizards	89	Cleveland Cavaliers	93		2008 NBA playoffs first round rematch.	TNT
2008–09	Boston Celtics	83	Los Angeles Lakers	92		Celtics–Lakers rivalry, 2008 NBA Finals rematch, Celtics enter as the defending NBA champions.	ABC
2008–09	New Orleans Hornets	68	Orlando Magic	88		New Orleans franchise's first Christmas Day game.	ESPN
2008–09	San Antonio Spurs	91	Phoenix Suns	90		Spurs–Suns rivalry, 2008 NBA playoffs first round rematch.	ABC
2008–09	Dallas Mavericks	102	Portland Trail Blazers	94			TNT
2009–10	Miami Heat	93	New York Knicks	87		Heat–Knicks rivalry	ESPN
2009–10	Cleveland Cavaliers	102	Los Angeles Lakers	87		Lakers enter as the defending NBA champions.	ABC
2009–10	Boston Celtics	86	Orlando Magic	77		2009 NBA playoffs second round rematch.	ABC
2009–10	Los Angeles Clippers	93	Phoenix Suns	124			ESPN
2009–10	Denver Nuggets	96	Portland Trail Blazers	107			ESPN
2010–11	Chicago Bulls	95	New York Knicks	103		Bulls–Knicks rivalry	ESPN
2010–11	Boston Celtics	78	Orlando Magic	86		2010 NBA playoffs Eastern Conference Finals rematch.	ABC
2010–11	Miami Heat	96	Los Angeles Lakers	80		Lakers enter as the defending NBA champions.	ABC
2010–11	Denver Nuggets	106	Oklahoma City Thunder	114			ESPN
2010–11	Portland Trail Blazers	102	Golden State Warriors	109			ESPN
2011–12	2011–12 season began on Christmas Day due to the 2011 NBA lockout						
2011–12	Boston Celtics	104	New York Knicks	106		Celtics–Knicks rivalry, 2011 NBA playoffs first round rematch.	TNT
2011–12	Miami Heat	105	Dallas Mavericks	94		2011 NBA Finals rematch, Mavericks enter as the defending NBA champions.	ABC
2011–12	Chicago Bulls	88	Los Angeles Lakers	87			ABC
2011–12	Orlando Magic	89	Oklahoma City Thunder	97			ESPN
2011–12	Los Angeles Clippers	105	Golden State Warriors	86			ESPN
2012–13	Boston Celtics	93	Brooklyn Nets	76			ESPN
2012–13	New York Knicks	94	Los Angeles Lakers	100			ABC
2012–13	Oklahoma City Thunder	97	Miami Heat	103		2012 NBA Finals rematch, Heat enter as the defending NBA champions.	ABC
2012–13	Houston Rockets	120	Chicago Bulls	97			ESPN
2012–13	Denver Nuggets	100	Los Angeles Clippers	112			ESPN
2013–14	Chicago Bulls	95	Brooklyn Nets	78		2013 NBA playoffs first round rematch.	ESPN
2013–14	Oklahoma City Thunder	123	New York Knicks	94			ABC
2013–14	Miami Heat	101	Los Angeles Lakers	95		Heat enter as the defending NBA champions.	ABC
2013–14	Houston Rockets	111	San Antonio Spurs	98		Rockets–Spurs rivalry	ESPN
2013–14	Los Angeles Clippers	103	Golden State Warriors	105			ESPN
2014–15	Washington Wizards	102	New York Knicks	91			ESPN
2014–15	Oklahoma City Thunder	114	San Antonio Spurs	106		2014 NBA playoffs Western Conference Finals rematch, Spurs enter as the defending NBA champions.	ABC
2014–15	Cleveland Cavaliers	91	Miami Heat	101		LeBron James against his former team.	ABC
2014–15	Los Angeles Lakers	93	Chicago Bulls	113			TNT
2014–15	Golden State Warriors	86	Los Angeles Clippers	100		2014 NBA playoffs first round rematch.	TNT
2015–16	New Orleans Pelicans	88	Miami Heat	94	(OT)		ESPN
2015–16	Chicago Bulls	105	Oklahoma City Thunder	96			ABC
2015–16	Cleveland Cavaliers	83	Golden State Warriors	89		Cavaliers–Warriors rivalry 2015 NBA Finals rematch Warriors enter as the defending NBA champions. 2016 NBA Finals preview	ABC
2015–16	San Antonio Spurs	84	Houston Rockets	88		Rockets–Spurs rivalry	ESPN
2015–16	Los Angeles Clippers	94	Los Angeles Lakers	84		Lakers–Clippers rivalry	ESPN
2016–17	Boston Celtics	119	New York Knicks	114		Celtics–Knicks rivalry	ESPN
2016–17	Golden State Warriors	108	Cleveland Cavaliers	109		Cavaliers–Warriors rivalry 2016 NBA Finals rematch Cavaliers enter as the defending NBA champions. 2017 NBA Finals preview	ABC
2016–17	Chicago Bulls	100	San Antonio Spurs	119			ABC
2016–17	Minnesota Timberwolves	100	Oklahoma City Thunder	112		Timberwolves' first Christmas Day game	ESPN
2016–17	Los Angeles Clippers	102	Los Angeles Lakers	111		Lakers–Clippers rivalry	ESPN
2017–18	Philadelphia 76ers	105	New York Knicks	98			ESPN
2017–18	Cleveland Cavaliers	92	Golden State Warriors	99		Cavaliers–Warriors rivalry 2017 NBA Finals rematch Warriors enter as the defending NBA champions. 2018 NBA Finals preview	ABC
2017–18	Washington Wizards	111	Boston Celtics	103		2017 NBA playoffs second round rematch.	ABC
2017–18	Houston Rockets	107	Oklahoma City Thunder	112		2017 NBA playoffs first round rematch.	ABC
2017–18	Minnesota Timberwolves	121	Los Angeles Lakers	104			TNT
2018–19	Milwaukee Bucks	109	New York Knicks	95			ESPN
2018–19	Oklahoma City Thunder	109	Houston Rockets	113			ABC
2018–19	Philadelphia 76ers	114	Boston Celtics	121	(OT)	76ers–Celtics rivalry, 2018 NBA playoffs second round rematch.	ABC
2018–19	Los Angeles Lakers	127	Golden State Warriors	101		Warriors enter as the defending NBA champions.	ABC/ESPN
2018–19	Portland Trail Blazers	96	Utah Jazz	117			ESPN
2019–20	Boston Celtics	118	Toronto Raptors	102		First Christmas Day game in Canada; Raptors enter as the defending NBA champions.	ESPN
2019–20	Milwaukee Bucks	109	Philadelphia 76ers	121			ABC
2019–20	Houston Rockets	104	Golden State Warriors	116		2019 NBA playoffs second round rematch. Warriors enter as defending Western Conference champions.	ABC
2019–20	Los Angeles Clippers	111	Los Angeles Lakers	106		Lakers–Clippers rivalry	ABC/ESPN
2019–20	New Orleans Pelicans	112	Denver Nuggets	100			ESPN
2020–21	2020–21 season began on December 22 due to the COVID-19 pandemic						
2020–21	New Orleans Pelicans	98	Miami Heat	111		Heat enter as the defending Eastern Conference champions.	ESPN
2020–21	Golden State Warriors	99	Milwaukee Bucks	138			ABC
2020–21	Brooklyn Nets	123	Boston Celtics	95			ABC
2020–21	Dallas Mavericks	115	Los Angeles Lakers	138		Lakers enter as the defending NBA champions.	ABC/ESPN
2020–21	Los Angeles Clippers	121	Denver Nuggets	108		2020 NBA playoffs second round rematch	ESPN
2021–22	Atlanta Hawks	87	New York Knicks	101		2021 NBA playoffs first round rematch.	ESPN
2021–22	Boston Celtics	113	Milwaukee Bucks	117		Bucks enter as the defending NBA champions.	ABC
2021–22	Golden State Warriors	116	Phoenix Suns	107		Stephen Curry breaks Christmas slump. Suns enter as the defending Western Conference champions.	ABC
2021–22	Brooklyn Nets	122	Los Angeles Lakers	115			ABC/ESPN
2021–22	Dallas Mavericks	116	Utah Jazz	120			ESPN
2022–23	Philadelphia 76ers	119	New York Knicks	112			ABC/ESPN/ESPN2/ESPN+ (Note: Originally scheduled to air solely on ESPN before it was later announced to be simulcast across ESPN and ABC.)
2022–23	Los Angeles Lakers	115	Dallas Mavericks	124			ABC/ESPN
2022–23	Milwaukee Bucks	118	Boston Celtics	139		Celtics enter as the defending Eastern Conference champions. 2022 NBA playoffs second round rematch.	ABC/ESPN
2022–23	Memphis Grizzlies	109	Golden State Warriors	123		Grizzlies' first Christmas Day game, Warriors enter as the defending NBA champions. 2022 NBA playoffs second round rematch.	ABC/ESPN
2022–23	Phoenix Suns	125	Denver Nuggets	128	(OT)		ABC/ESPN
2023–24	Milwaukee Bucks	122	New York Knicks	129			ESPN/ESPN2/ESPN+
2023–24	Golden State Warriors	114	Denver Nuggets	120		Nuggets enter as the defending NBA champions.	ABC/ESPN/ESPN+
2023–24	Boston Celtics	126	Los Angeles Lakers	115		Celtics–Lakers rivalry	ABC/ESPN/ESPN+
2023–24	Philadelphia 76ers	113	Miami Heat	119		Heat enter as the defending Eastern Conference champions.	ESPN/ESPN+
2023–24	Dallas Mavericks	128	Phoenix Suns	114			ESPN/ESPN+
2024–25	San Antonio Spurs	114	New York Knicks	117			ABC/ESPN/ESPN+/Disney+ (Note: "Dunk the Halls" alternate broadcast on ESPN2, ESPN+ and Disney+)
2024–25	Minnesota Timberwolves	105	Dallas Mavericks	99		2024 NBA playoffs Western Conference Finals rematch, Mavericks enter as the defending Western Conference champions.	ABC/ESPN/ESPN+/Disney+
2024–25	Philadelphia 76ers	118	Boston Celtics	114		76ers–Celtics rivalry Celtics enter as the defending NBA champions.	ABC/ESPN/ESPN+/Disney+
2024–25	Los Angeles Lakers	115	Golden State Warriors	113		Lakers–Warriors rivalry	ABC/ESPN/ESPN+/Disney+
2024–25	Denver Nuggets	100	Phoenix Suns	110		Suns' first Christmas win since 2009	ABC/ESPN/ESPN+/Disney+
2025–26	Cleveland Cavaliers	124	New York Knicks	126			ABC/ESPN/ESPN+/Disney+ (Note: "Dunk the Halls" alternate broadcast on ESPN2, Disney Channel, Disney XD, Disney+ and ESPN DTC)
2025–26	San Antonio Spurs	117	Oklahoma City Thunder	102		Thunder enter as the defending NBA champions	ABC/ESPN
2025–26	Dallas Mavericks	116	Golden State Warriors	126			ABC/ESPN
2025–26	Houston Rockets	119	Los Angeles Lakers	96			ABC/ESPN
2025–26	Minnesota Timberwolves	138	Denver Nuggets	142	(OT)	Nuggets–Timberwolves rivalry	ABC/ESPN
2026–27	San Antonio Spurs		New York Knicks			2026 NBA Finals rematch, Knicks enter as the defending NBA champions.	ABC/ESPN
2026–27	Miami Heat		Boston Celtics			Celtics–Heat rivalry	ABC/ESPN
2026–27	Philadelphia 76ers		Los Angeles Lakers			LeBron James against his former team.	ABC/ESPN
2026–27	Oklahoma City Thunder		Minnesota Timberwolves				ABC/ESPN
2026–27	Denver Nuggets		Golden State Warriors				ABC/ESPN

== Christmas Day standings ==
Of current NBA teams.

Team	Last Game	Appearances	Wins	Losses	Win %	Previous team names
Atlanta Hawks	2021 (Lost 101–87 at New York)	21	9	12	.429	Tri-Cities Blackhawks (1949–1951); Milwaukee Hawks (1951–1955); St. Louis Hawks (1955–1968)
Boston Celtics	2024 (Lost 118–114 vs. Philadelphia)	38	17	21	.447	
Brooklyn Nets	2021 (Won 122–115 at L.A. Lakers)	11	6	5	.545	New Jersey Nets (1977–2012)
Charlotte Hornets	Never	0	0	0	–	Charlotte Bobcats (2004–2014)
Chicago Bulls	2016 (Lost 119–100 at San Antonio)	21	13	8	.619	
Cleveland Cavaliers	2025 (Lost 126–124 at New York)	15	7	8	.467	
Dallas Mavericks	2025 (Lost 126–116 at Golden State)	9	4	5	.444	
Denver Nuggets	2025 (Won 142–138 vs. Minnesota)	11	4	7	.364	
Detroit Pistons	2005 (Won 85–70 vs. San Antonio)	32	10	22	.313	Fort Wayne Pistons (1948–1957)
Golden State Warriors	2025 (Won 126–116 vs. Dallas)	25	16	19	.457	Philadelphia Warriors (1946–1962); San Francisco Warriors (1962–1971)
Houston Rockets	2025 (Won 119–96 at L.A. Lakers)	13	7	6	.538	San Diego Rockets (1967–1971)
Indiana Pacers	2004 (Lost 98–93 vs. Detroit)	4	2	2	.500	
Los Angeles Clippers	2020 (Won 121–108 at Denver)	17	8	9	.471	Buffalo Braves (1970–1978); San Diego Clippers (1978–1984)
Los Angeles Lakers	2025 (Lost 119–96 vs. Houston)	52	25	27	.481	Minneapolis Lakers (1948–1960)
Memphis Grizzlies	2022 (Lost 123–109 at Golden State)	1	0	1	.000	Vancouver Grizzlies (1995–2001)
Miami Heat	2023 (Won 119–113 vs. Philadelphia)	14	12	2	.857	
Milwaukee Bucks	2023 (Lost 122–129 at New York)	10	5	5	.500	
Minnesota Timberwolves	2025 (Lost 142–138 at Denver)	4	2	2	.500	
New Orleans Pelicans	2020 (Lost 98–111 at Miami)	4	1	3	.250	New Orleans Hornets (2002–2005, 2007–2013); New Orleans/Oklahoma City Hornets (2005–2007)
New York Knicks	2025 (Won 126–124 vs. Cleveland)	58	26	32	.448	
Oklahoma City Thunder	2025 (Lost 117–102 vs. San Antonio)	21	6	15	.286	Seattle SuperSonics (1967–2008)
Orlando Magic	2011 (Lost 97–89 at Oklahoma City)	9	5	4	.556	
Philadelphia 76ers	2024 (Won 118–114 at Boston)	35	20	15	.571	Syracuse Nationals (1949–1963)
Phoenix Suns	2024 (Won 110–100 vs. Denver)	22	13	9	.591	
Portland Trail Blazers	2018 (Lost 117–96 at Utah)	18	14	4	.778	
Sacramento Kings	2003 (Lost 111–103 vs. Dallas)	29	18	11	.621	Rochester Royals (1948–1957); Cincinnati Royals (1957–1972); Kansas City-Omaha Kings (1972–1975); Kansas City Kings (1975–1985)
San Antonio Spurs	2025 (Won 117–102 at Oklahoma City)	13	6	7	.462	
Toronto Raptors	2019 (Lost 118–102 vs. Boston)	2	0	2	.000	
Utah Jazz	2021 (Won 120–116 vs. Dallas)	8	6	2	.750	New Orleans Jazz (1974–1979)
Washington Wizards	2017 (Won 111–103 at Boston)	23	16	7	.696	Chicago Packers (1961–1962); Chicago Zephyrs (1962–1963); Baltimore Bullets (1963–1973); Capital Bullets (1973–1974); Washington Bullets (1974–1997)

=== Most frequent match-ups among active teams ===
Count	Matchup	Record	Years Played
13	New York Knicks vs. Philadelphia 76ers	76ers, 8–5	1953, 1954, 1957, 1960, 1962, 1968, 1974, 1975, 1976, 1977, 1978, 2017, 2022
8	Boston Celtics vs. New York Knicks	Celtics, 5–3	1954, 1958, 1959, 1967, 1980, 1985, 2011, 2016
6	Golden State Warriors vs. Portland Trail Blazers	Trail Blazers, 5–1	1977, 1978, 1979, 1980, 1984, 2010
6	Los Angeles Lakers vs. Phoenix Suns	Lakers, 4–2	1968, 1973, 1976, 1981, 1996, 2007
6	Philadelphia 76ers vs. Washington Wizards	Tie, 3–3	1967, 1969, 1971, 1979, 1986, 1988

== Reception ==
=== Praise ===
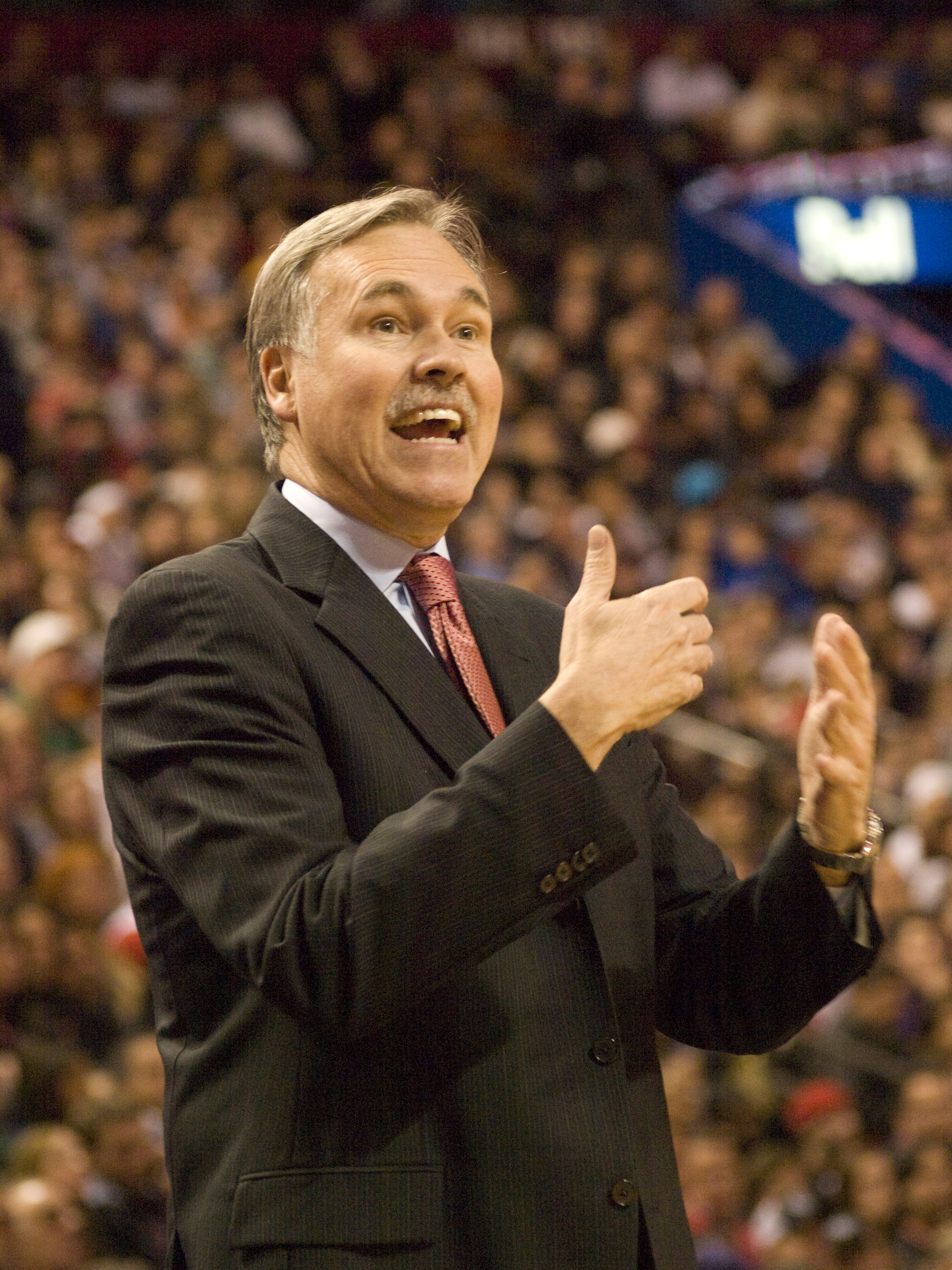
Mike D'Antoni said that the players should feel "very fortunate" to play on Christmas Day and said that they could adjust their schedules a bit.

Several fans, players, coaches, and members of the news media support the tradition of Christmas games. For players and coaches, the standard public statement is that a Christmas game is an honor, as it is not only a chance to play on national television, but also a reward for having a great team and great players.

Before the game between the Celtics and Magic at Amway Arena in 2009, personnel on both sides referred to playing on Christmas as a reward. Celtics head coach Doc Rivers said that like most of the players, he always watched Christmas Day games growing up. He said, "As a kid, you wanted to be on Christmas...I tend to look at it as a reward." In 2010, added that it was an "honor" to be part of the marquee games, saying, "I look at it as a privilege. The fact that they asked us to play on Christmas means we're one of the good teams, one of the featured teams." Magic center Dwight Howard said that he didn't "see a challenge. We're playing basketball on Christmas. We couldn't help it. If you play on a pretty good team and if you have to play on Christmas, so be it. I enjoy it. I'd rather be playing on Christmas than sitting at home wishing I was playing on Christmas. I like it. I think it's fun."

Lamar Odom called it "a tremendous privilege to be able to entertain the world...playing on TV in those games." In 2010, Knicks head coach Mike D'Antoni said that players should be "very fortunate" to be playing on Christmas Day and that "it helps the league, and...it helps other people on Christmas or on the holidays."

Doug White, an ESPN executive, said that Christmas is "Thanksgiving on the NBA side. Obviously, Christmas Day is a day when everybody is home, everybody is relaxing, and what better way to serve them than with as many games as we possibly can...We try to put on the best games possible that people have interest in." Jermaine O'Neal on the Celtics agreed, saying, "It's special because the whole world is watching. It's Christmas, it's a special day, with everybody together to spend time with each other, as far as family and friends. We have the opportunity to do that, bringing our families down with us. It makes it that much more special—the opportunity to play in front of the rest of the world and be together at Christmas with our family."

During broadcasts of NBA games, commentators and the news media have agreed with White and said that the nature of the games played has made Christmas Day the best day of an NBA regular season. They serve as a preview of a potential series in the playoffs, and perhaps, the finals.

=== Criticism ===
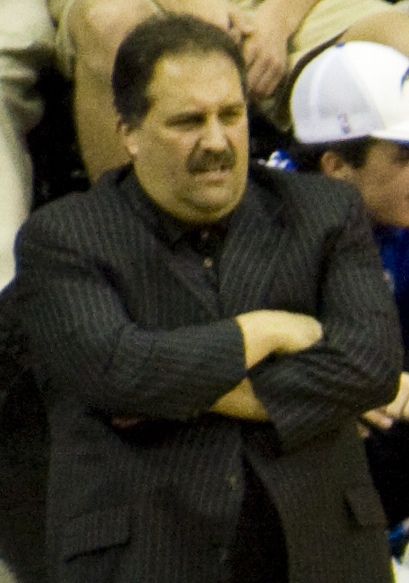
The Orlando Magic were fined in 2009 after Coach Stan Van Gundy said that the NBA should not be playing on Christmas Day.

In recent years, players and coaches have complained about playing on Christmas Day, saying that takes time away from families. In 2009, Orlando Magic head coach Stan Van Gundy requested that the NBA do not schedule any more games on Christmas Day, saying "I actually feel sorry for people who have nothing to do on Christmas Day other than watch an NBA game" and said that the day is best spent with family. The Magic coach was fined for his comments.

In 2010, there were complaints from both sides before the game between the Miami Heat and the Los Angeles Lakers in Los Angeles. Lakers head coach Phil Jackson, son of two Christian ministers and author of a book on spiritual growth related to basketball, said, "I don't think anybody should play on Christmas Day" and "it's like Christian holidays don't mean...anything any more." From the Heat, LeBron James said, "if you ask any player in the league, we'd rather be home with our families...It's not just a regular holiday. It's...one of those days that you wish you could wake up in the morning with the kids and open up presents."

Others have managed to voice some discontent while still accepting the Christmas game tradition. Before the game between the Bulls and the Knicks in New York, head coach Mike D'Antoni said, "I can adjust a little bit. I can open my presents up at 7 o'clock at night instead of 7 o'clock in the morning." Raymond Felton said, "you'd rather be with your family. We're still going to celebrate." He, like many players, said that he was fortunate to have played with his family in attendance. Bulls head coach Tom Thibodeau said, "I think it's an honor and a privilege to be playing. I know it's tough on the away team, particularly the players who have kids. But that's all part of it." Derrick Rose said, "I'm going to miss my family, and I hate being away from home. But this is my job and it's an honor to be playing on Christmas."

In 2004, the NBA was erroneously criticized for scheduling a game between the Detroit Pistons and Indiana Pacers as the first matchup since their brawl that the two teams had faced each other. The regular season, and the game, was scheduled well before the brawl took place, and was played with a higher-than-normal security presence and fan restrictions to prevent a repeat occurrence. The other game scheduled that day drew similar criticism. The game between the Miami Heat and Los Angeles Lakers at Staples Center marked the first time since the Lakers traded Shaquille O'Neal to the Heat that the two teams were facing each other and the first time that Shaq and Kobe Bryant would be facing each other as opponents.

The NBA does not schedule games on Christmas Eve, December 24, to allow players and coaches who have to play on Christmas Day to be with their families. Families of players and coaches who participate in Christmas games typically attend the games.

=== Television ratings ===
The NBA's Christmas games have garnered some of the highest ratings for any televised regular season NBA game. The television ratings for the biggest Christmas games are often higher than any NBA game outside of the NBA Finals, and for many U.S. sports fans, Christmas serves as an unofficial "start" to the NBA season; the usual start of the NBA season occurs under relatively little fanfare compared to the NFL or MLB, as those leagues are at the most consequential points of their seasons.

However, ratings for the NBA's Christmas games usually pale in comparison to the NFL whenever the league plays games on Christmas Day. Beginning in 2020, the NFL scheduled Christmas Day games annually as opposed to previous years when the league only scheduled games on Christmas whenever it falls on a weekend; the league has since signed a deal with Netflix to stream non-weekend Christmas games. This resulted in further ratings decline for the NBA during the holiday. For instance, in 2023, the NBA suffered a record-low average of 1.3 rating and 2.85 million viewership for all of its Christmas Day games whereas the NFL games averaged 27 million viewers.
