= Bulls–Knicks rivalry =

National Basketball Association rivalry

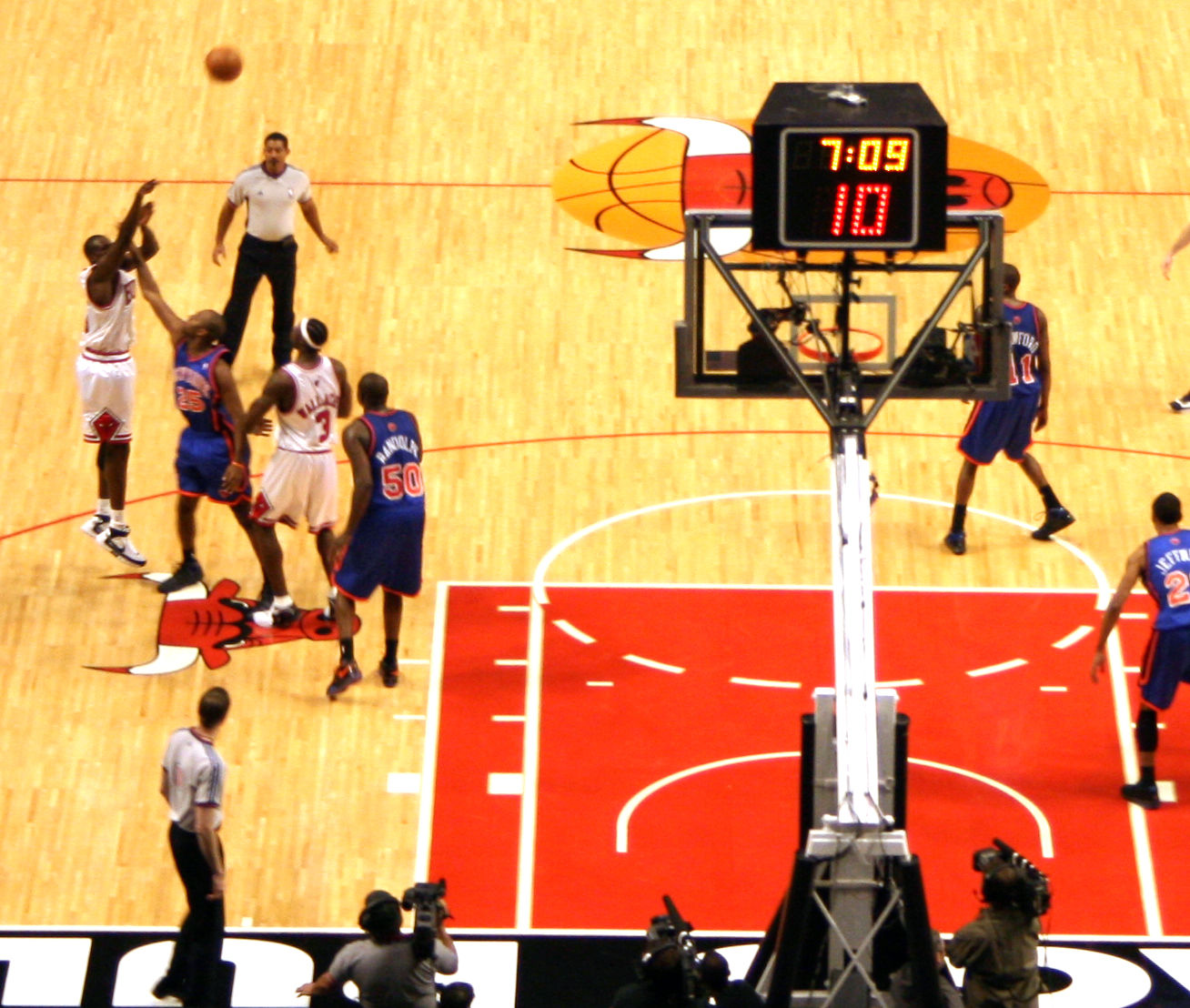
- Bulls vs. Knicks regular season game at the United Center in 2007

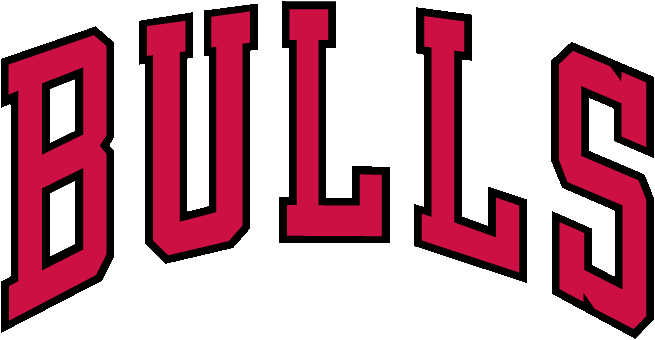
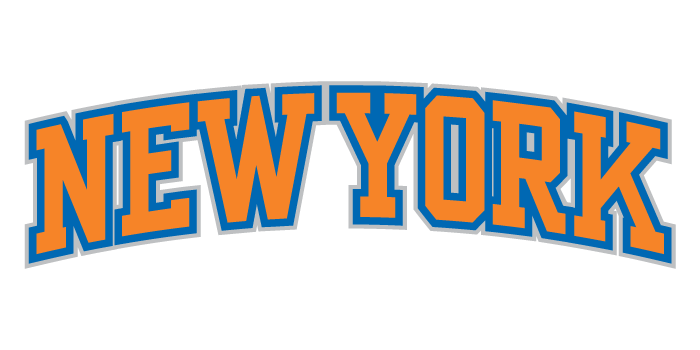
- Chicago Bulls New York Knicks
- First meeting: October 23, 1966; Knicks 124, Bulls 105
- Latest meeting: November 4, 2026; Knicks 135, Bulls 105
- Next meeting: December 1, 2026

Statistics
- Total meetings: 291
- All-time series: 155–136 (CHI)
- Regular season series: 131–124 (CHI)
- Postseason results: 24–12 (CHI)
- Longest win streak: CHI W11
- Current win streak: NYK W5

Postseason history
- 1981 Eastern Conference First Round: Bulls won, 2–0; 1989 Eastern Conference Semifinals: Bulls won, 4–2; 1991 Eastern Conference First Round: Bulls won, 3–0; 1992 Eastern Conference Semifinals: Bulls won, 4–3; 1993 Eastern Conference Finals: Bulls won, 4–2; 1994 Eastern Conference Semifinals: Knicks won, 4–3; 1996 Eastern Conference Semifinals: Bulls won, 4–1

The Bulls–Knicks rivalry is a rivalry between the Chicago Bulls and the New York Knicks of the National Basketball Association (NBA). The two basketball teams have played each other every year since the Bulls first joined the NBA in 1966.

The rivalry peaked in intensity from the late 1980s to the mid-1990s, when both teams became huge playoff contenders. This was due to a variety of factors: the great frequency in which the teams competed against each other in high-stakes contests and playoff series; well-known players such as Michael Jordan, Scottie Pippen, Patrick Ewing, and John Starks; the reputations of the team's respective cities; and personnel changes and conflicts between the teams. The two teams met in the playoffs during six of the eight years from 1989 to 1996, with the Bulls winning five of those series.

== History ==
=== Early years ===
Between 1966 and 1980, the Bulls and Knicks were inter-conference rivals, as the Bulls played in the Western Division/Conference during this period. Both teams were regularly present in the NBA playoffs during the late 1960s to mid-1970s, but neither met in the NBA Finals.

The Bulls of that era, led by Jerry Sloan, Bob Love, Norm Van Lier, Chet Walker, and Tom Boerwinkle, struggled to advance deep in the playoffs as they regularly lost to powerhouse teams like the Jerry West-led Los Angeles Lakers and Kareem Abdul-Jabbar's Milwaukee Bucks. The Knicks, on the other hand, made three finals and won two championships featuring players such as Willis Reed, Walt Frazier, Bill Bradley, Dave DeBusschere, Jerry Lucas, Earl Monroe, and future Bulls coach Phil Jackson.

=== 1981–1988: First playoff meeting and aftermath ===
In the 1980 offseason, the Bulls moved to the Eastern Conference, making their rivalry with the Knicks an intra-conference affair.

The two teams' first playoff meeting was in first round of the 1981 NBA playoffs, a best-of-three series. Chicago, under head coach Jerry Sloan, won both games to sweep the series against New York 2–0. Chicago would be swept in the next round by the Boston Celtics, the eventual champions, in a best-of-seven series. Sloan was fired during the following season.

In the 1984 NBA draft, the Chicago Bulls used their first-round pick (3rd overall) to select shooting guard Michael Jordan, who would eventually lead Chicago to six NBA Championships in the 1990s with teammates Scottie Pippen and Dennis Rodman, under the direction of head coach Phil Jackson. The next year, the New York Knicks used their first-round pick (1st overall) in the 1985 NBA draft to select center Patrick Ewing, who would go on to become one of the Knicks' most notable players over the next 15 years.

=== 1988–1993: Chicago Bulls first dynasty ===
The Knicks and Bulls met in the playoffs for the second time in 1989. This time, the rivalry was much more pronounced, as the Knicks had just won their first Atlantic Division title since 1971 with a 52–30 record and clinched the 2nd seed in the East. Meanwhile, 6th-seeded Chicago won just 47 games, but was led by reigning NBA MVP and Defensive Player of the Year Michael Jordan. The Bulls won Game 1 in New York, and all three in Chicago to upset the Knicks 4–2 and qualify for the Eastern Conference Finals, which they lost in six games to the eventual champion Detroit Pistons.

When the two teams met again in 1991, their roles were reversed. Chicago led the East with a then franchise-best 61 wins to capture the Central Division title. On the opposite end, the Knicks limped into the playoffs at 39–43 with the 8th seed. Chicago cruised past New York in a 3-game sweep, winning each game by an average of 20 points. They would go on to claim the first NBA Championship in franchise history.

==== 1992 Eastern Conference Semifinals ====
In 1992, the Bulls (having won six more games than the previous season), led by Jordan and Pippen, were on their way to their second straight title when they met the Knicks led by Ewing and new head coach Pat Riley in the Eastern Conference Semifinals. The series went to a decisive Game 7, which the Bulls won 110–81 to advance. This kick-started the intense rivalry and made the Knicks into an Eastern Conference powerhouse, replacing the Pistons and Celtics. This was the first of two Game 7's that the Bulls faced in the six seasons they won a championship, the other with the Pacers in the 1998 Eastern Conference Finals. This particular series became intense, with several players, particularly Michael Jordan, Xavier McDaniel, Scottie Pippen, and Greg Anthony getting into arguments.

Shortly afterwards, there was a moment of peace in the rivalry, with Ewing, Jordan, and Pippen winning gold medals as members of the "Dream Team" at the 1992 Summer Olympics. Ewing, Jordan, and Chris Mullin are the only basketball players to win gold medals as amateurs and professionals, having won at the 1984 Summer Olympics. Jordan and Pippen, along with LeBron James in 2012, Kyrie Irving in 2016, Jrue Holiday and Khris Middleton in 2021, Jayson Tatum, Jrue Holiday and Derrick White in 2024, are the eight players to have won an NBA championship and Olympic gold medal in the same year. Pippen and Holiday are the only players to accomplish this feat twice, as Pippen played for the Bulls in 1996 and Team USA at the 1996 Summer Olympics, while Holiday played for the Bucks in 2021 and Team USA at the 2021 Summer Olympics, and the Celtics in 2024 and Team USA at the 2024 Summer Olympics.

==== 1993 Eastern Conference Finals: "The Charles Smith Game" ====
“Ewing for Smith. Smith. Stripped. Smith. Stopped. Smith stopped again! By Pippen! What a play by Scottie Pippen! Final seconds — Jordan, for Armstrong — and the Bulls have defeated the Knicks!”

— NBC's play-by-play announcer Marv Albert memorable call during Knicks vs. Bulls (Game 5, 1993 Eastern Conference Finals) final seconds.

In the 1992–93 season, the Knicks finished ahead of Chicago in the regular season and had home court advantage in the Eastern Conference Finals. The series had the notable highlight of Starks dunking over Horace Grant in front of Michael Jordan late in Game 2. However, despite being down 2–0, the Bulls came back and won the next 4, including a 97–94 Game 5 victory in New York. In Game 4 of the series, Jordan scored 54 points, the most against the Knicks in a playoff game by any player. The series was also notable for Game 5 of the series; With the series tied 2-2, Knicks forward Charles Smith was stopped 4 straight times by a series of blocks and strips in the final seconds while trying to score. The Bulls won Game 6 96–88 to advance to the 1993 NBA Finals, where they beat the Suns in 6 games for their first three-peat. This would be Jordan's last game until 1995, as he retired to play baseball for the Chicago White Sox.

=== 1994–1998: Chicago Bulls second dynasty ===
==== 1994 Eastern Conference Semifinals: Hue Hollins Phantom Call ====
With Jordan's absence in 1993–94 the Knicks had the upper hand and compiled the second best record in the East. The Bulls, led by Pippen and newcomer Toni Kukoč, met the Knicks in the second round, where the series went 7 games. Game 3 of the series was marred by a brawl between Jo Jo English and Derek Harper in which both players rolled into the stands. What made things worse was that the brawl took place with NBA Commissioner David Stern in attendance. The Bulls had a 19-point lead entering the 4th, but the Knicks tied it with 1.8 seconds left on a Patrick Ewing hook shot. Scottie Pippen famously refused to take the floor after Phil Jackson drew the final play for Kukoc, who hit a buzzer-beater to win the game. In one of the most argued calls in NBA history, a questionable foul was called by Hue Hollins in the closing seconds of Game 5 against Pippen, which gave Hubert Davis two free throws to turn a one-point deficit into a one-point victory for the Knicks.

After a blowout Bulls win in Game 6, highlighted by a vicious Scottie Pippen over Patrick Ewing and it being the final game ever played at Chicago Stadium, the Knicks advanced past the Bulls with a series-clinching 87–77 win, but eventually lost to the Rockets in the 1994 NBA Finals. This was the only time the Knicks were able to beat the Bulls in the playoffs during this era. Also, all the games in the series were won by the home team, and the Knicks had home court advantage in the series.

==== 1995 - 1998: Jordan Returns, 1996 Eastern Conference Semifinals, and Jordan's Last Game at MSG ====
In 1994–95, Jordan returned in the latter half of the regular season. In his return to the Garden, his 5th game back, Jordan scored 55 in a Chicago win on March 29, 1995. This game lifted Jordan's confidence after a mediocre performance in his "comeback game" against the Pacers. They didn't meet in the playoffs that season, but the animosity between the teams still grew.

During the Bulls' record-setting 1995–96 season, they suffered their worst loss of the season to the Knicks, 102–74 in March. Two months later, they defeated the Knicks in the Eastern Conference Semifinals in 5 games.

During the Bulls' second three-peat, they only met in the playoffs once; in 1996 when the Bulls defeated the Knicks. It was also during this period that other teams in the East grew to be contenders, such as the Indiana Pacers, Orlando Magic, and Miami Heat. All of these teams had their own heated battles with either the Bulls or Knicks in the playoffs. In 1997, Knicks coach Jeff Van Gundy famously labeled Michael Jordan a "con man" for befriending opponents to gain a competitive edge. Jordan took this personally, responding with a 51-point performance against New York shortly after.

On March 8, 1998, Jordan had his last game as a Bull at Madison Square Garden.

In the 1990s, both Knicks Finals appearances (1994 and their Cinderella march of 1999) followed a Bulls' 3-peat, but the Knicks lost both times to a team from Texas (Houston Rockets and San Antonio Spurs). Overall, the Bulls and Knicks won the represented the Eastern Conference in 8 of the 10 Finals in the 1990s.

=== Later years ===
The departures of Jordan, Pippen and Ewing led to the decline of both the Bulls and Knicks, and neither team was able to recapture the same success they enjoyed in the 1990s. The Bulls only made one Conference Finals appearance since their 1998 championship, doing so in 2011. Contrarily, the Knicks won the 2026 NBA Finals after beating the San Antonio Spurs in 5 games, ending their 53-year championship drought, their first title since 1973.

During this era, the only times both teams were in the playoffs took place in the 2011, 2012 and 2013 seasons, neither of which resulted in the Bulls and Knicks meeting in a playoff series. Both teams have reached up to the Eastern Conference Finals.

On January 18, 2005, Ben Gordon scored a game-winning layup to lead the Bulls past the Knicks at the Madison Square Garden. Then on April 8, 2012, Carmelo Anthony's three-point shot in overtime gave the Knicks the win at home over Chicago. Finally, on October 31, 2013, Derrick Rose banked in a game-winning field goal to beat the Knicks at the United Center. On June 22, 2016, the Bulls traded Rose, Justin Holiday, and a 2017 draft pick to the Knicks for Robin Lopez, Jerian Grant, and José Calderón, who was soon traded to the Los Angeles Lakers. On November 13, 2024, Coby White made game-winning free throws following a shooting foul committed by Josh Hart to lead the Bulls past the Knicks at the Madison Square Garden.

The Bulls and Knicks faced off in East Group C of the 2025 NBA Cup, with their group stage meeting on October 31, 2025, at Chicago. The Bulls gave the Knicks their only loss of the tournament with a 135–125 win. However, in their succeeding regular season game at New York on November 2, the Knicks handed the Bulls their first loss of the regular season with a 128–116 win. The Knicks went on to win the group and eventually the 2025 NBA Cup championship, becoming the first champions in the tournament's history to finish with a non-perfect record.

== Causes ==
The significance of the rivalry was due partly to the bragging rights of the two biggest cities in the East: the Big Apple vs. the Windy City. The physical play of the teams made it intense, especially in the playoffs. The matchup between Jordan and Starks brought some drama as they were both intense players who showcased a number of highlight dunks on the opposing team. Despite the Knicks not winning an NBA title or beating the Bulls in a postseason series while Jordan was in the league, this rivalry was considered the most contentious of the 1990s.

== Season-by-season results ==
Chicago Bulls vs. New York Knicks Season-by-Season Results
1960s (Knicks, 21–7)

Season	Season series		at Chicago Bulls	at New York Knicks	at Neutral Site	Overall series	Notes
1966–67	Knicks	6–3	Tie, 2–2	Knicks, 2–0	Knicks, 2–1	Knicks; 6–3	Neutral site games were played at: Roberts Stadium, Evansville, Indiana; Boston Garden, Boston, Massachusetts; Baltimore Civic Center, Baltimore, Maryland; Bulls join the National Basketball Association (NBA) as an expansion team. They are placed in the Western Division; One game was played on Christmas.
1967–68	Knicks	5–2	Tie, 1–1	Knicks, 2–0	Knicks, 2–1	Knicks; 11–5	Neutral site games were played at: Milwaukee Arena, Milwaukee, Wisconsin; The Spectrum, Philadelphia, Pennsylvania; Roberts Stadium; Bulls move to the Chicago Stadium.
1968–69	Knicks	4–2	Knicks, 2–1	Tie, 1–1	Knicks, 1–0	Knicks; 15–7	Neutral site game was played at Boston Garden. Last season the rivalry was played on a neutral site. Knicks open up Madison Square Garden.
1969–70	Knicks	6–0	Knicks, 3–0	Knicks, 3–0		Knicks; 21–7	Knicks finish with the best record in the league (60–22). Knicks win 1970 NBA Finals.

1970s (Tie, 20–20)

Season	Season series		at Chicago Bulls	at New York Knicks	Overall series	Notes
1970–71	Bulls	3–2	Tie, 1–1	Bulls, 2–1	Knicks; 23–10	The Knicks were placed in the Eastern Conference and the Atlantic Division, while the Bulls were placed in the Western Conference and the Midwest Division. Bulls finished with a winning record in New York for the first time.
1971–72	Bulls	3–2	Bulls, 2–1	Tie, 1–1	Knicks; 25–13	Bulls finished with a winning record at home for the first time. Knicks lose 1972 NBA Finals.
1972–73	Bulls	3–1	Bulls, 2–0	Tie, 1–1	Knicks; 26–16	Knicks win 1973 NBA Finals.
1973–74	Tie	2–2	Tie, 1–1	Tie, 1–1	Knicks; 28–18	
1974–75	Bulls	3–1	Bulls, 2–0	Tie, 1–1	Knicks; 29–21	
1975–76	Knicks	4–0	Knicks, 2–0	Knicks, 2–0	Knicks; 33–21	
1976–77	Tie	2–2	Bulls, 2–0	Knicks, 2–0	Knicks; 35–23	
1977–78	Knicks	3–1	Tie, 1–1	Knicks, 2–0	Knicks; 38–24	
1978–79	Bulls	3–1	Tie, 1–1	Bulls, 2–0	Knicks; 39–27	On March 24, 1979, Bulls beat the Knicks 148–143 in double overtime, their most points scored in a game against the Knicks. It was also the Knicks' most points scored in a game against the Bulls.
1979–80	Knicks	2–0	Knicks, 1–0	Knicks, 1–0	Knicks; 41–27	

1980s (Bulls, 36–26)

Season	Season series		at Chicago Bulls	at New York Knicks	Overall series	Notes
1980–81	Tie	3–3	Bulls, 2–1	Knicks, 2–1	Knicks; 44–30	Bulls were moved to the Eastern Conference and the Central Division.
1981 Eastern Conference First Round	Bulls	2–0	Bulls, 1–0	Bulls, 1–0	Knicks; 44–32	1st postseason series.
1981–82	Bulls	3–2	Tie, 1–1	Bulls, 2–1	Knicks; 46–35	
1982–83	Knicks	4–1	Knicks, 2–1	Knicks, 2–0	Knicks; 50–36	
1983–84	Knicks	4–2	Knicks, 2–1	Knicks, 2–1	Knicks; 54–38	
1984–85	Bulls	4–2	Bulls, 3–0	Knicks, 2–1	Knicks; 56–42	Bulls draft Michael Jordan.
1985–86	Bulls	4–2	Bulls, 2–1	Bulls, 2–1	Knicks; 58–46	
1986–87	Bulls	4–2	Bulls, 2–1	Bulls, 2–1	Knicks; 60–50	One game was played on Christmas.
1987–88	Bulls	3–2	Bulls, 2–0	Knicks, 2–1	Knicks; 62–53	
1988–89	Bulls	3–2	Bulls, 3–0	Knicks, 2–0	Knicks; 64–56	
1989 Eastern Conference Semifinals	Bulls	4–2	Bulls, 3–0	Knicks, 2–1	Knicks; 66–60	2nd postseason series.
1989–90	Bulls	3–1	Bulls, 2–0	Tie, 1–1	Knicks; 67–63	One game was played on Martin Luther King Jr. Day.

1990s (Bulls, 41–25)

Season	Season series		at Chicago Bulls	at New York Knicks	Overall series	Notes
1990–91	Bulls	4–0	Bulls, 2–0	Bulls, 2–0	Tie; 67–67	Bulls record their first season series sweep against the Knicks. Final season Knicks held the overall series record.
1991 Eastern Conference First Round	Bulls	3–0	Bulls, 2–0	Bulls, 1–0	Bulls; 70–67	3rd postseason series. In Game 1, Bulls beat the Knicks 126–85, their largest victory against the Knicks with a 41–point differential. Bulls win 1991 NBA Finals, their first NBA championship.
1991–92	Bulls	4–0	Bulls, 2–0	Bulls, 2–0	Bulls; 74–67	Bulls win 14 games in a row against the Knicks and 17 home games in a row against the Knicks. Bulls finish with the best record in the league (67–15).
1992 Eastern Conference Semifinals	Bulls	4–3	Bulls, 3–1	Knicks, 2–1	Bulls; 78–70	4th postseason series. As of November 18, 2026, Knicks' win in Chicago remains their only playoff victory in Chicago. Game 7 featured Michael Jordan's famous steal and strip. Bulls win 1992 NBA Finals.
1992–93	Knicks	3–1	Tie, 1–1	Knicks, 2–0	Bulls; 79–73	On November 28, 1992, Knicks beat the Bulls 112–75, their largest victory against the bulls with a 37–point differential. One game was played on Christmas.
1993 Eastern Conference Finals	Bulls	4–2	Bulls, 3–0	Knicks, 2–1	Bulls; 83–75	5th postseason series. Game 3 featured a famous dunk by Knicks' SG John Starks on Bulls' PF Horace Grant and Michael Jordan later nicknamed "The Dunk". In Game 4, Jordan scores 54 points, the most against the Knicks in a playoff game by any player. In Game 5, Bulls' PG B. J. Armstrong hits the clutch 3 with 1:16 left, while Knicks' PF Charles Smith gets blocked 4 straight times by Grant, Jordan, and Bulls' SF Scottie Pippen at the end of the game. Bulls win 1993 NBA Finals, their first three-peat.
1993–94	Knicks	3–1	Tie, 1–1	Knicks, 2–0	Bulls; 84–78	
1994 Eastern Conference Semifinals	Knicks	4–3	Bulls, 3–0	Knicks, 4–0	Bulls; 87–82	6th postseason series. Game 3 featured Bulls Toni Kukoč hitting the game-winner at the buzzer. Game 5 featured a controverall call by Hue Hollins, who called a person foul against Scottie Pippen. It enabled Knicks' SG Hubert Davis to make two successful free throws that led to a Knicks' win. Game 6 featured Pippen's famous dunk over Knicks' C Patrick Ewing, followed by his taunting of Spike Lee, and was the final game played at Chicago Stadium. Knicks win their first playoff series against the Bulls. Knicks go on to lose 1994 NBA Finals.
1994–95	Bulls	3–1	Bulls, 2–0	Tie, 1–1	Bulls; 90–83	Bulls open up United Center. One game was played on Christmas.
1995–96	Bulls	3–1	Bulls, 2–0	Tie, 1–1	Bulls; 93–84	Bulls finish with the best record in the league and also set a record for most wins in a season at the time (72–10) (Broken by the 2015 73–9 Warriors).
1996 Eastern Conference Semifinals	Bulls	4–1	Bulls, 3–0	Tie, 1–1	Bulls; 97–85	7th postseason series. Bulls win 1996 NBA Finals.
1996–97	Tie	2–2	Tie, 1–1	Tie, 1–1	Bulls; 99–87	Bulls win 11 home games in a row against the Knicks. Bulls finish with the best record in the league (69–13). Bulls win 1997 NBA Finals.
1997–98	Bulls	4–0	Bulls, 2–0	Bulls, 2–0	Bulls; 103–87	Bulls record their 100th win against the Knicks. Last season Michael Jordan played for the Bulls. Bulls win 1998 NBA Finals, becoming the first team in NBA history to have two separate three-peats.
1998–99	Knicks	2–1	Tie, 1–1	Knicks, 1–0	Bulls; 104–89	Knicks lose 1999 NBA Finals.
1999–2000	Knicks	3–0	Knicks, 1–0	Knicks, 2–0	Bulls; 104–92	Knicks finish with a winning record at Chicago for the first time since the 1983 season and their first season series sweep against the Bulls since the 1979 season.

2000s (Bulls, 24–13)

Season	Season series		at Chicago Bulls	at New York Knicks	Overall series	Notes
2000–01	Knicks	3–1	Tie, 1–1	Knicks, 2–0	Bulls; 105–95	
2001–02	Bulls	3–1	Bulls, 2–0	Tie, 1–1	Bulls; 108–96	
2002–03	Bulls	2–1	Bulls, 2–0	Knicks, 1–0	Bulls; 110–97	
2003–04	Tie	2–2	Tie, 1–1	Tie, 1–1	Bulls; 112–99	
2004–05	Bulls	4–0	Bulls, 2–0	Bulls, 2–0	Bulls; 116–99	One game was played on Martin Luther King Jr. Day.
2005–06	Bulls	2–1	Bulls, 1–0	Tie, 1–1	Bulls; 118–100	Knicks record their 100th win against the Bulls.
2006–07	Bulls	3–1	Bulls, 2–0	Tie, 1–1	Bulls; 121–101	
2007–08	Tie	2–2	Tie, 1–1	Tie, 1–1	Bulls; 123–103	
2008–09	Bulls	2–1	Bulls, 2–0	Knicks, 1–0	Bulls; 125–104	One game was played on Martin Luther King Jr. Day.
2009–10	Bulls	3–1	Bulls, 2–0	Tie, 1–1	Bulls; 128–105	

2010s (Bulls, 19–16)

Season	Season series		at Chicago Bulls	at New York Knicks	Overall series	Notes
2010–11	Knicks	2–1	Knicks, 1–0	Tie, 1–1	Bulls; 129–107	One game was played on Christmas. Knicks finish with a winning record at Chicago for the first time since the 1999 season. Bulls finish with the best record in the league (62–20).
2011–12	Bulls	3–1	Bulls, 2–0	Tie, 1–1	Bulls; 132–108	Bulls finish tied with the best record in the league (50–16).
2012–13	Bulls	4–0	Bulls, 2–0	Bulls, 2–0	Bulls; 136–108	
2013–14	Tie	2–2	Bulls, 2–0	Knicks, 2–0	Bulls; 138–110	
2014–15	Bulls	3–0	Bulls, 2–0	Bulls, 1–0	Bulls; 141–110	
2015–16	Knicks	3–1	Tie, 1–1	Knicks, 2–0	Bulls; 142–113	
2016–17	Knicks	3–0	Knicks, 1–0	Knicks, 2–0	Bulls; 142–116	Knicks' first season series sweep against the Bulls since the 1999 season.
2017–18	Bulls	3–1	Bulls, 2–0	Tie, 1–1	Bulls; 145–117	
2018–19	Knicks	2–1	Knicks, 1–0	Tie, 1–1	Bulls; 146–119	
2019–20	Knicks	2–1	Bulls, 1–0	Knicks, 2–0	Bulls; 147–121	Due to the COVID-19 pandemic suspending the season, their remaining game at Chicago was canceled.

2020s (Knicks, 13–8)

Season	Season series		at Chicago Bulls	at New York Knicks	Overall series	Notes
2020–21	Knicks	2–1	Tie, 1–1	Knicks, 1–0	Bulls; 148–123	
2021–22	Tie	2–2	Tie, 1–1	Tie, 1–1	Bulls; 150–125	
2022–23	Knicks	2–1	Knicks, 2–0	Bulls, 1–0	Bulls; 151–127	
2023–24	Knicks	3–1	Tie, 1–1	Knicks, 2–0	Bulls; 152–130	
2024–25	Bulls	2–1	Bulls, 1–0	Tie, 1–1	Bulls; 154–131	
2025–26	Knicks	3–1	Tie 1–1	Knicks, 2–0	Bulls; 155–134	On October 31, 2025, at Chicago, the Bulls beat the Knicks 135–125 during the 2025 NBA Cup group stage. Knicks win 2025 NBA Cup. Knicks win 2026 NBA Finals.
2026–27	Tie	0-0	October 28th, 2026 and December 1st, 2026	November 4th, 2026	Bulls; 155–134	

Summary of Results

Season	Season series		at Chicago Bulls	at New York Knicks	at Neutral Site	Notes
Regular season games	Bulls	131–122	Bulls, 81–42	Knicks, 74–48	Knicks, 5–2	
Postseason games	Bulls	24–12	Bulls, 18–1	Knicks, 11–6		
Postseason series	Bulls	6–1	Bulls, 3–0	Bulls, 3–1		Eastern Conference First Round: 1981, 1991; Eastern Conference Semifinals: 1989, 1992, 1994, 1996; Eastern Conference Finals: 1993
Regular and postseason	Bulls	155–134	Bulls, 99–44	Knicks, 85–54	Knicks, 5–2	There were 7 neutral site games played in total: 2 games at Roberts Stadium and Boston Garden.; 1 game at Baltimore Civic Center, Milwaukee Arena, and The Spectrum.

== See also ==
- Bulls–Pistons rivalry
- Heat–Knicks rivalry
- Bears–Giants rivalry, a similar rivalry in the NFL between Chicago and New York City-based teams
- National Basketball Association rivalries
