= Heat–Magic rivalry =

National Basketball Association cross-state rivalry in Florida

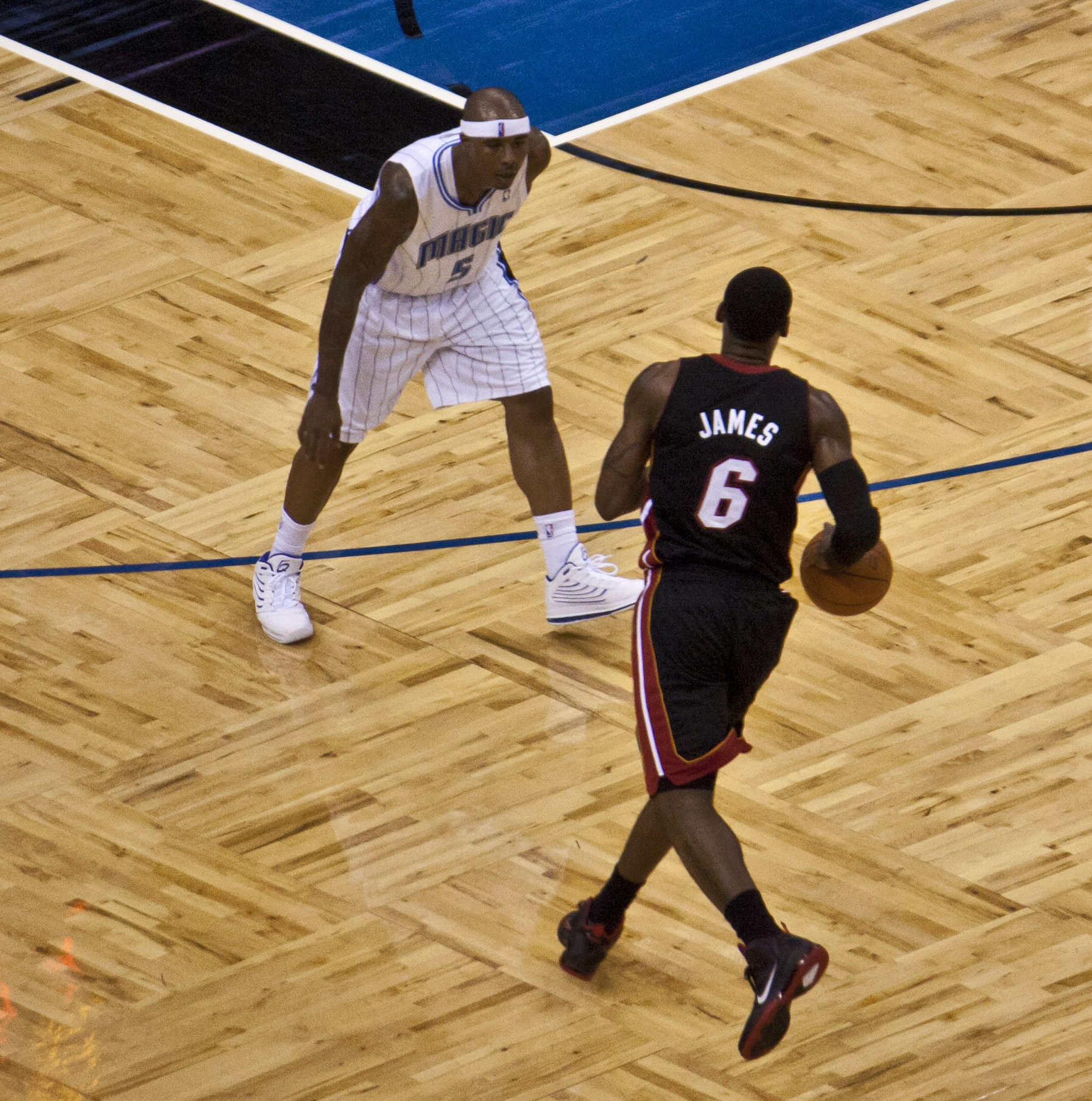
- Magic's Quentin Richardson defends then Heat's LeBron James during a regular season game at Amway Center (now Kia Center) in December 2011.

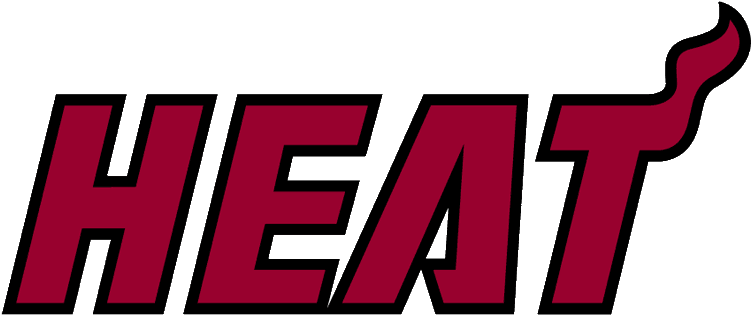
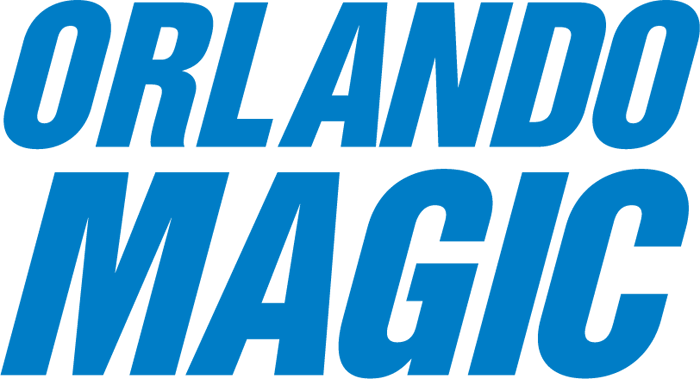
- Miami Heat Orlando Magic
- First meeting: November 28, 1989; Heat 99, Magic 104
- Latest meeting: March 14, 2026; Magic 121, Heat 117
- Next meeting: February 12, 2027 (regular season)

Statistics
- Total meetings: 152
- All-time series: 84–68 (MIA)
- Regular season series: 81–66 (MIA)
- Postseason results: 3–2 (MIA)
- Longest win streak: MIA W9; ORL W10
- Current win streak: ORL W5

Postseason history
- 1997 Eastern Conference First Round: Heat won, 3–2

Locations of the Miami Heat and Orlando Magic.

The Heat–Magic rivalry is an National Basketball Association (NBA) rivalry between the Miami Heat and the Orlando Magic. It is also known as the Sunshine State rivalry since both the Heat and the Magic are based in the state of Florida, similar to the Rockets–Spurs rivalry.

== Background ==
The rivalry started when two teams were expanded into the NBA, both being from Florida which made it a battle for basketball supremacy statewide. Orlando became the first team in Florida to reach the Finals which they did in 1995. Miami quickly followed with a strong team of its own after Shaquille O'Neal left Orlando in 1996.

== 1997 Playoffs ==
The NBA playoffs saw a single encounter between two teams: the Miami Heat (2nd seed, 61–21) and the Orlando Magic (7th seed, 45–37) during the 1997 Eastern Conference First Round. This matchup, taking place in the inaugural season after O'Neal's departure from Orlando, positioned Miami as the frontrunners for the series victory.

The initial two games unfolded at Miami Arena, where the Heat convincingly secured victories. In Game 1, Heat center Alonzo Mourning showcased an impressive performance with six blocks, equalling the second-highest block count by any player in a game throughout the 1997 playoffs. Adding to the prowess, Voshon Lenard made a significant impact by scoring 24 points, including six three-pointers. The game resulted in a dominant 35-point victory for Miami, marking the second-largest point differential in a win by any team during the 1997 playoffs. Furthermore, this achievement is tied for the second-largest point differential in a playoff game in the history of Miami's franchise. Game 2 was a closer contest but Miami ended up with a 17-point victory. Heat guard Tim Hardaway dropped 20 points and 11 assists in the victory.

The following game took place in Orlando Arena, where Miami had the opportunity to win the third game of the 5-game series and advancing to the Eastern Conference Semifinals. Around halfway into the 2nd quarter of Game 3, Miami had taken a 20-point lead leading Orlando 39–19. However, Magic guard Penny Hardaway recorded an impressive 42 points and 8 rebounds to help Orlando comeback and secure a victory in Game 3. Hardaway's 42 points is tied for the 5th most points in a playoff game by an Orlando Magic player in franchise history. His 16 field goals is tied for the 2nd most field goals in a playoff game by an Orlando Magic player in franchise history. Darrell Armstrong also had 21 points and 8 assists of his own off the bench. This win lead to the necessity of a Game 4, which was also held in Orlando. Miami came into Game 4 looking to move on to the Conference Semifinals while Orlando was looking to even the series and force a Game 5 back in Miami. Penny Hardaway dropped 18 points in the first quarter alone and finished the game with 41 points and 4 steals. He hit three free throws in the final two minutes and helped the Magic stunningly force a Game 5. Penny Hardaway became one of just two Orlando players to score 40 points in consecutive playoff games, alongside Tracy McGrady.

Even with all this, Miami was the better team and prevailed in the decisive fifth game with two huge buckets from Tim Hardaway in the fourth quarter. Miami would eventually make the Eastern Conference Finals that year until they were defeated by the eventual champion Chicago Bulls.

== 2010–2012: Arrival of LeBron James ==
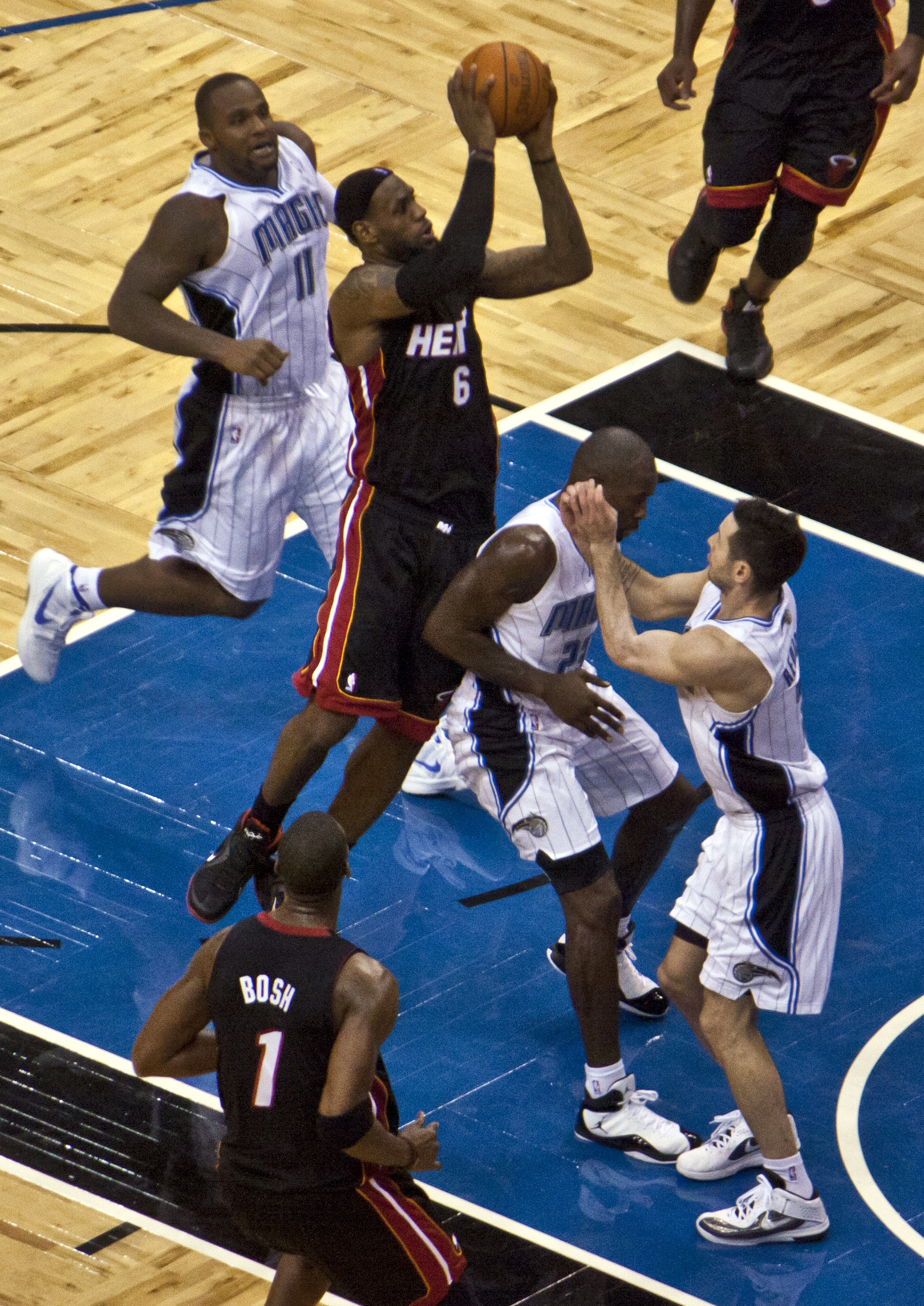
LeBron James attempting a shot against the Orlando Magic during a preseason game at Amway Center in 2011

In the 2010 off season, the Miami Heat made headlines regularly after it was announced that LeBron James would sign with the team as a free agent. Other teams in the NBA felt slighted and overwhelmed by the amount of coverage the Heat were given.

Magic head coach Stan Van Gundy was one of the people that noticed the "extra" coverage the Heat had received. Earlier in the year of 2010 at a press conference, Van Gundy stated: "I'm surprised there was enough media left for you guys to get here. ESPN is all Heat, all the time."

The players got involved as well. Marcin Gortat said "Honestly, I'm sick of listening every hour about Miami—Miami that, how great they are, how big they are, what kind of record they gonna have." Dwight Howard chimed in by simply stating "We're trying to take their heads off." Even upper management got involved in the verbal feud. Otis Smith, the president of basketball operations for the Orlando Magic was discussing LeBron going to Miami and had this to say: "I was surprised that he went. I thought he was, I guess, more of a competitor."

Eventually LeBron responded to this comment regarding his competitiveness. "Orlando, that's funny that they questioned my competitiveness. I like that. The locker room—we're going to put a lot of stuff in the locker room...We'll deal with them later."

== 2012-present: Rivalry Cools Down ==
After the departure of Dwight Howard from the Magic in 2012, the rivalry has softened but still remains heated amongst the organizations and its fans. Orlando had a 6-year playoff drought from 2012–13 to 2017–18, while Miami made the playoffs four times in that stretch. Within that stretch, the Heat won 17 games against Orlando, while Orlando won 7 games against Miami.

On March 6, 2013, LeBron James hit a left-handed game-winning layup with 3.2 seconds remaining to give Miami the win at home against Orlando. Orlando had a chance to break Miami's 15-game winning streak. That winning streak would eventually blossom to 27, which is the 3rd highest in NBA history.

On March 26, 2019, the two teams squared off in the American Airlines Arena in a matchup that was crucial for both teams to win for playoff implications. Coincidentally, it was also the day the Miami Heat honored big-man Chris Bosh by retiring his #1 jersey, which occurred during the half-time period. The ceremony to commemorate Bosh took thirty-six minutes. Orlando took advantage of the situation and started the 3rd quarter on a 27–15 run and ended up winning the game 104–99. Orlando moved to 37–38 on the season, while Miami's loss made them 36–38. Orlando would go on to grab the 7th seed in the Eastern Conference whilst Miami would miss the playoffs for the fourth time in 16 seasons. Additionally, it was also the first time the Magic won more games in a season than Miami since the 2009–10 NBA season.

In the 2020 NBA All-Star Game, Derrick Jones Jr. of the Heat and Aaron Gordon of the Magic competed against each other in the final round of the Slam Dunk Contest. Gordon became the first player in the history of the competition to receive five consecutive perfect scores and yet still lost to Jones Jr. due to a score of 47 on his final dunk attempt over Tacko Fall. Gordon told reporters after that he wouldn't do the competition again because he felt as if he was deserving of two trophies, "It's a wrap. I feel like I should have two trophies.". Gordon was referring to his dunk contest battle against Zach LaVine in 2016. The three celebrity judges who gave Gordon a score of 9 were Chadwick Boseman, Scottie Pippen, and former Heat player, Dwyane Wade. This sparked a lot of controversy in social media and the internet, considering Wade played alongside Jones Jr. the season prior, and due to the in-state rivalry.

On January 12, 2024, Heat big-man Bam Adebayo hit a go-ahead jumper against the Magic with 18.5 seconds remaining over Magic big-man Moritz Wagner. Miami would end up winning the game 99–96.

On December 21, 2024, the two teams met at the Kia Center. Orlando played without their top three scorers: Paolo Banchero, Franz Wagner, and Jalen Suggs, all sidelined due to injury. Miami was without forward Jimmy Butler, who missed the game due to illness. Miami erupted for 40 points in the first quarter and followed that with 36 points in the second, setting a season high for the team with 76 points in the first half. The Heat led by as many as 25 points in the second quarter and were ahead 106-84 at the end of the third quarter. However, a 13-point fourth quarter explosion by Magic guard Cole Anthony, along with crucial contributions from Goga Bitadze and Trevelin Queen, sparked a comeback. Orlando outscored Miami 37-8 in the fourth quarter to secure a 121-114 victory. The 25-point comeback matched Orlando's largest in franchise history.

On December 9, 2025, the two teams met for the 2025 NBA Cup knockout round quarterfinals. The Magic earned their spot by winning East Group A, while the Heat secured the Eastern Conference wild card spot by having the best point differential among the three second-place teams in the conference. Led by Desmond Bane scoring 37 points, the Magic won the game at home 117–108, advancing to the semifinals to be held at the T-Mobile Arena near Las Vegas.

== Season-by-season results ==
Miami Heat vs. Orlando Magic Season-by-Season Results
1989–1990s (Heat, 27–21)

| Season | Season series | | at Miami Heat | at Orlando Magic | Overall series | Notes |
|---|---|---|---|---|---|---|
| 1989–90 | Heat | 3–1 | Heat, 2–0 | Tie, 1–1 | Heat; 3–1 | Orlando Magic join the NBA as an expansion team and are placed in the Eastern Conference and the Central Division. Miami Heat are moved to the Eastern Conference and the Atlantic Division. |
| 1990–91 | Tie | 1–1 | Heat, 1–0 | Magic, 1–0 | Heat; 4–2 | Magic are temporarily moved to the Western Conference and the Midwest Division. |
| 1991–92 | Heat | 3–1 | Heat, 2–0 | Tie, 1–1 | Heat; 7–3 | Magic move back to the Eastern Conference and are placed in the Atlantic Division, becoming divisional rivals with the Heat. |
| 1992–93 | Heat | 3–2 | Heat, 2–0 | Magic, 2–1 | Heat; 10–5 | On April 4, 1993, the Heat beat the Magic 124–106, their most points scored in a game against the Heat that resulted in a win. |
| 1993–94 | Magic | 3–2 | Magic, 3–0 | Heat, 2–0 | Heat; 12–8 | Road team sweeps the season series for the first time. |
| 1994–95 | Magic | 3–1 | Tie, 1–1 | Magic, 2–0 | Heat; 13–11 | On November 21, 1994, the Magic beat the Heat 124–89, their largest victory against the Heat with a 35-point differential. Magic win the Atlantic Division for the first time. Magic lose 1995 NBA Finals. |
| 1995–96 | Magic | 3–1 | Tie, 1–1 | Magic, 2–0 | Tie; 14–14 | Magic win the Atlantic Division. |
| 1996–97 | Tie | 2–2 | Tie, 1–1 | Tie, 1–1 | Tie; 16–16 | Heat win the Atlantic Division for the first time. |
| 1997 Eastern Conference First Round | Heat | 3–2 | Heat, 3–0 | Magic, 2–0 | Heat; 19–18 | 1st postseason series. First postseason meeting between two Florida-based professional sports teams. |
| 1997–98 | Heat | 3–1 | Tie, 1–1 | Heat, 2–0 | Heat; 22–19 | Heat win the Atlantic Division. |
| 1998–99 | Heat | 2–1 | Heat, 1–0 | Tie, 1–1 | Heat; 24–20 | Heat win the Atlantic Division. |
| 1999–2000 | Heat | 3–1 | Heat, 2–0 | Tie, 1–1 | Heat; 27–21 | Last season Heat played at Miami Arena. On January 2, 2000, Heat open up and move to American Airlines Arena (now known as Kaseya Center). The Heat beat the Magic 111–103 in overtime in the arena's inaugural game. Heat win the Atlantic Division. |

2000s (Magic, 21–19)

| Season | Season series | | at Miami Heat | at Orlando Magic | Overall series | Notes |
|---|---|---|---|---|---|---|
| 2000–01 | Heat | 3–1 | Tie, 1–1 | Heat, 2–0 | Heat; 30–22 | |
| 2001–02 | Heat | 3–1 | Heat, 2–0 | Tie, 1–1 | Heat; 33–23 | |
| 2002–03 | Magic | 4–0 | Magic, 2–0 | Magic, 2–0 | Heat; 33–27 | Magic sweep the season series against the Heat for the first time. |
| 2003–04 | Heat | 4–0 | Heat, 2–0 | Heat, 2–0 | Heat; 37–27 | Heat sweep the season series against the Magic for the first time. |
| 2004–05 | Heat | 4–0 | Heat, 2–0 | Heat, 2–0 | Heat; 41–27 | Heat and Magic are placed in the new Southeast Division. Heat win the inaugural Southeast Division. |
| 2005–06 | Tie | 2–2 | Tie, 1–1 | Tie, 1–1 | Heat; 43–29 | Heat win the Southeast Division. Heat win 2006 NBA Finals, their first NBA Championship. |
| 2006–07 | Magic | 4–0 | Magic, 2–0 | Magic, 2–0 | Heat; 43–33 | Heat win the Southeast Division. |
| 2007–08 | Magic | 4–0 | Magic, 2–0 | Magic, 2–0 | Heat; 43–37 | Magic win their first Southeast Division. |
| 2008–09 | Magic | 3–1 | Tie, 1–1 | Magic, 2–0 | Heat; 44–40 | Magic win 10 games in a row against the Heat. Magic win the Southeast Division. Magic lose 2009 NBA Finals. |
| 2009–10 | Tie | 2–2 | Tie, 1–1 | Tie, 1–1 | Heat; 46–42 | Last season Magic played at Amway Arena (previously known as Orlando Arena). Magic win the Southeast Division. |

2010s (Heat, 25–15)

| Season | Season series | | at Miami Heat | at Orlando Magic | Overall series | Notes |
|---|---|---|---|---|---|---|
| 2010–11 | Tie | 2–2 | Tie, 1–1 | Tie, 1–1 | Heat; 48–44 | Magic open up Amway Center (now known as Kia Center). Heat win the Southeast Division. Heat lose 2011 NBA Finals. |
| 2011–12 | Tie | 2–2 | Heat, 2–0 | Magic, 2–0 | Heat; 50–46 | Heat win the Southeast Division. Heat win 2012 NBA Finals. |
| 2012–13 | Heat | 4–0 | Heat, 2–0 | Heat, 2–0 | Heat; 54–46 | Heat win the Southeast Division. Heat finish with the best record in the league (66–16). Heat win 2013 NBA Finals. |
| 2013–14 | Heat | 4–0 | Heat, 2–0 | Heat, 2–0 | Heat; 58–46 | On November 20, 2013, the Heat beat the Magic 120–92, their largest victory against the Magic with a 28-point differential. Heat win the Southeast Division. Heat lose 2014 NBA Finals. |
| 2014–15 | Heat | 3–1 | Tie, 1–1 | Heat, 2–0 | Heat; 61–47 | Heat win 10 games in a row against the Magic. |
| 2015–16 | Heat | 3–1 | Heat, 2–0 | Tie, 1–1 | Heat; 64–48 | Heat win the Southeast Division. |
| 2016–17 | Magic | 3–1 | Magic, 2–0 | Tie, 1–1 | Heat; 65–51 | On December 20, 2016, the Magic beat the Heat 136–130 in double overtime, their most points scored in a game against the Heat. It was also the most points the Heat scored in a game against the Magic. |
| 2017–18 | Tie | 2–2 | Tie, 1–1 | Tie, 1–1 | Heat; 67–53 | Heat win the Southeast Division. |
| 2018–19 | Magic | 3–1 | Magic, 2–0 | Tie, 1–1 | Heat; 68–56 | Magic win the Southeast Division. |
| 2019–20 | Heat | 3–1 | Heat, 2–0 | Tie, 1–1 | Heat; 71–57 | Heat win the Southeast Division. Heat lose 2020 NBA Finals. |

2020s (Heat, 13–11)

| Season | Season series | | at Miami Heat | at Orlando Magic | Overall series | Notes |
|---|---|---|---|---|---|---|
| 2020–21 | Heat | 2–1 | Heat, 1–0 | Tie, 1–1 | Heat; 73–58 | |
| 2021–22 | Heat | 3–1 | Heat, 2–0 | Tie, 1–1 | Heat; 76–59 | Heat win the Southeast Division. |
| 2022–23 | Heat | 3–1 | Heat, 2–0 | Tie, 1–1 | Heat; 79–60 | Heat win the Southeast Division. Heat lose 2023 NBA Finals. |
| 2023–24 | Heat | 3–1 | Heat, 2–0 | Tie, 1–1 | Heat; 82–61 | Magic win the Southeast Division. |
| 2024–25 | Tie | 2–2 | Tie, 1–1 | Tie, 1–1 | Heat; 84–63 | Magic win the Southeast Division. |
| 2025–26 | Magic | 5–0 | Magic, 2–0 | Magic, 3–0 | Heat; 84–68 | On December 9, 2025, the Magic beat the Heat 117–108 during the 2025 NBA Cup quarterfinals, eliminating the Heat from the tournament. |
| 2026–27 | Tie | 0-0 | March 10th and April 11th, 2027 | February 12th and April 5th, 2027 | Heat; 84–68 | |

Summary of Results

| Season | Season series | | at Miami Heat | at Orlando Magic | Notes |
|---|---|---|---|---|---|
| Regular season games | Heat | Heat; 81–66 | Heat, 45–27 | Magic, 39–36 | |
| Postseason games | Heat | Heat; 3–2 | Heat, 3–0 | Magic, 2–0 | |
| Postseason series | Heat | 1–0 | Heat, 1–0 | N/A | Eastern Conference First Round: 1997 |
| Regular and postseason | Heat | Heat; 84–68 | Heat, 48–27 | Magic, 41–36 | |

== See also ==
- List of National Basketball Association rivalries
- Buccaneers–Dolphins rivalry
- Lightning–Panthers rivalry
- Fort Lauderdale–Tampa Bay rivalry
- Inter Miami CF–Orlando City SC rivalry
