= Mavericks–Spurs rivalry =

National Basketball Association cross-state rivalry in Texas

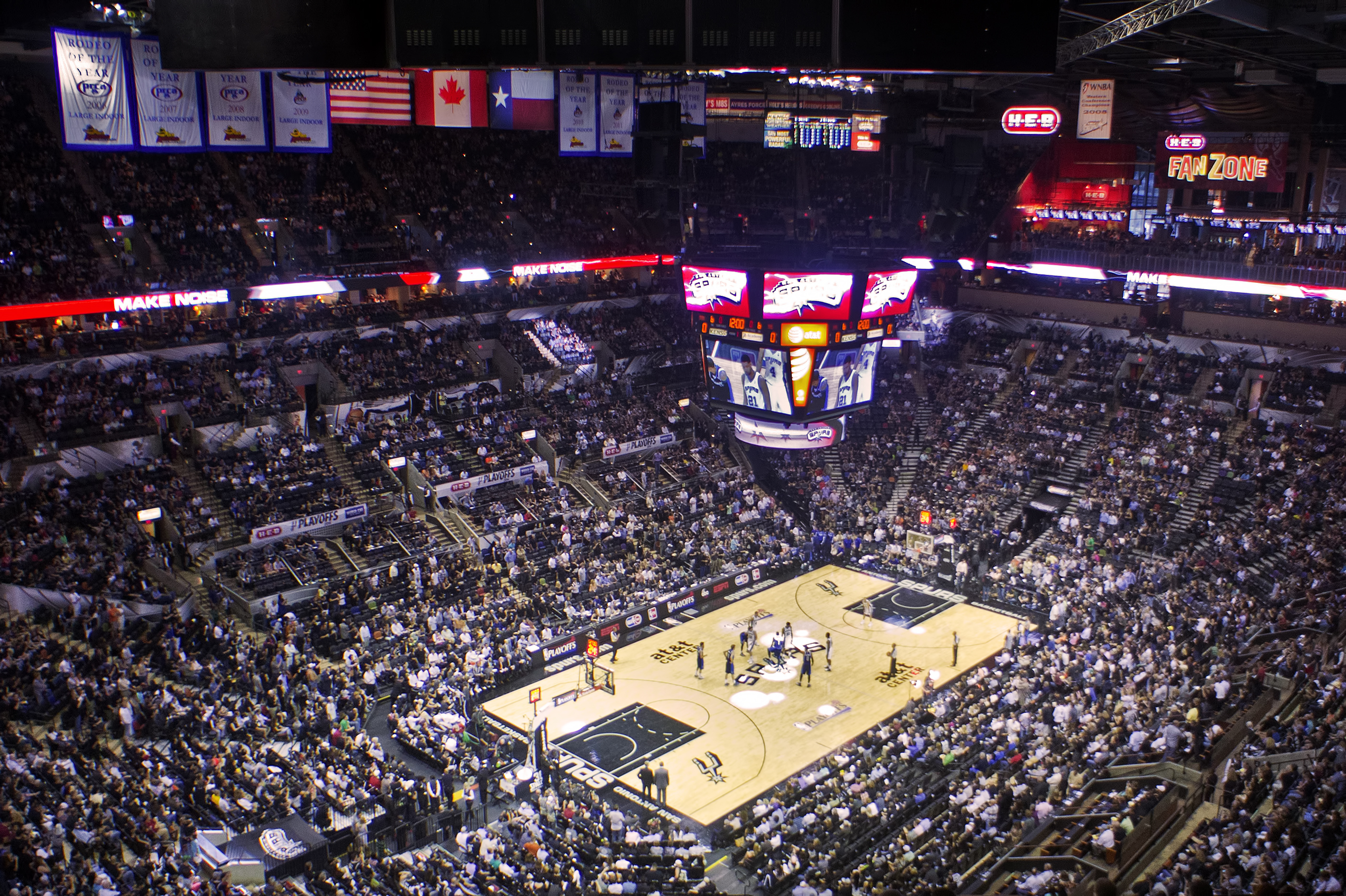
- Mavericks vs. Spurs Game 2 at AT&T Center during the 2014 NBA playoffs first round

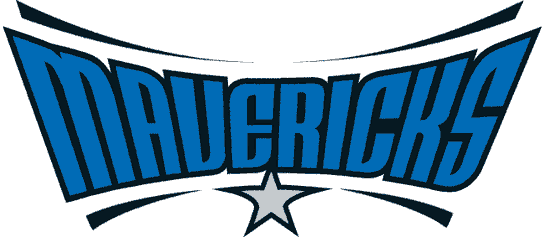
- Dallas Mavericks San Antonio Spurs
- First meeting: October 11, 1980; Mavericks 103, Spurs 92
- Latest meeting: November 4, 2026; Spurs 112, Mavericks 111
- Next meeting: February 9, 2027

Statistics
- Total meetings: 244
- All-time series: 142–103 (SAS)
- Regular season series: 122–87 (SAS)
- Postseason results: 20–16 (SAS)
- Longest win streak: SAS W16
- Current win streak: SAS W7

Postseason history
- 2001 Western Conference Semifinals: Spurs won, 4–1; 2003 Western Conference Finals: Spurs won, 4–2; 2006 Western Conference Semifinals: Mavericks won, 4–3; 2009 Western Conference First Round: Mavericks won, 4–1; 2010 Western Conference First Round: Spurs won, 4–2; 2014 Western Conference First Round: Spurs won, 4–3

The Mavericks–Spurs rivalry is an NBA rivalry between the Dallas Mavericks and the San Antonio Spurs. It is an intense rivalry that often features contested games. It is also known as the I-35 Rivalry since San Antonio and Dallas lie on Interstate 35, it is one of the three National Basketball Association rivalries between teams from Texas, the others featuring Dallas and San Antonio versus the Houston Rockets.

== Background ==
The Mavericks–Spurs rivalry is relatively new, emerging in the 2000s and early 2010s, but very fierce. It features two teams with Dallas roots—the Spurs began their life in the ABA as the Dallas Chaparrals and did not move to San Antonio until 1973. On October 11, 1980, the Mavs made their NBA debut by defeating the Spurs 103–92. The teams have met numerous times in the playoffs, with the Spurs defeating the Mavericks in 2001, 2003, 2010, and 2014, while the Mavericks defeated the Spurs in 2006 and 2009. The Spurs have won five championships and seven conference titles, while the Mavericks have won one championship and three conference titles. The Spurs have won 16 division titles, while the Mavericks have won 3. Both the Spurs and the Mavericks have 3 60-win seasons, with the Mavericks having 3 60-win seasons during the 2000s while the Spurs have 3 60-win seasons during the 2000s,1 60-win season during the 2010s, and one 60 win season during the 2020s

The two teams met in the playoffs during the 2000–2001 season with the Spurs winning in five games. Little was made during this series, as the Spurs won their first NBA championship only two years before. The Mavericks, run by a trio of Steve Nash, Michael Finley, and Dirk Nowitzki, had just defeated the Utah Jazz despite not having home court advantage and were only starting to meld into a title contender.

The two teams met again in 2003 in the Western Conference Finals. Both the Spurs and the Mavericks had 60-win seasons and reached the Western Conference Finals after defeating the Los Angeles Lakers and the Sacramento Kings, respectively. Despite having the best season of their history, the Mavericks fell in six games to the Spurs, as Nowitzki missed Games 4–6 after injuring his knee in Game 3.

The rivalry took on a new meaning in 2005 when, near the end of the regular season, Don Nelson would resign as head coach of the Mavericks, apparently satisfied with the state of the team, and hand the coaching reins to former Spur Avery Johnson, the point guard of the 1999 NBA champion Spurs team who hit the game-winning shot against the New York Knicks. Since Johnson was coached under Spurs' Head Coach Gregg Popovich, he would be familiar with most, if not all, of Popovich's coaching style and philosophy. During the 2005 offseason, Michael Finley, who was waived by the Mavericks under the amnesty clause, joined the Spurs in search for the elusive title.

During the 2006 playoffs, the two rivals met again. San Antonio won the first game at home 87–85. The Mavericks got revenge the next game, winning 113–91 and evening the series up at 1–1. The Mavericks then won a dramatic Game 3 by a single point, 104–103. Though Manu Ginóbili could have made a game-winning basket with five seconds on the clock, he committed an error, allowing the ball to bounce away from him with one second remaining. Dallas won a tightly contested Game 4 123–118 in overtime. The Spurs proceeded to avoid elimination by taking Game 5. In the final seconds of the game, Jason Terry was seen punching former teammate Michael Finley under the belt, leading to his suspension for Game 6. He was sorely missed as the Spurs won, taking the series back home for a Game 7. In the crucial Game 7, with 2.6 seconds to go, Nowitzki converted a three-point play to force overtime. Manu Ginóbili, who fouled Dirk on the play, had just given San Antonio their first lead one possession earlier. Tim Duncan, who had played in all 48 minutes of regulation, was too fatigued to carry his team in overtime. The Mavericks, meanwhile, were set to take control of the game and they did just that, winning 119–111. The Mavericks went on to the Conference Finals where they defeated the Suns in six games, but succumbed to the champion Heat in the NBA Finals. This series was notable due to controversy in regards to both teams being forced to meet in the Western Conference Semifinals and not the Western Conference Finals. This was because despite both teams having the two best records in the Western Conference, all division champions were guaranteed at least the third seed at the time. Since both teams resided in the same division and Dallas finished second behind the Spurs, the Mavericks was forced into the fourth seed. Since neither team was upset, and the playoff format is a fixed bracket, this series was viewed as taking place earlier in the playoffs than it was supposed to. This led to a modification in division champions only guaranteed at least the fourth seed to prevent this from happening again (this change would last until 2016).

Despite much anticipation of a renewed meeting in the 2007 Western Conference Finals, the Mavericks lost to the Golden State Warriors in one of the greatest upsets in NBA history. The Spurs won the NBA Finals after beating the Cleveland Cavaliers 4–0. The eighth seed Warriors, who made the playoffs on the last game of the NBA season, defeated the 67-win, first-seed Mavericks in six games. Meanwhile, the Spurs would ultimately go on to win the 2007 NBA Championship, establishing themselves as a true NBA dynasty. The season also gave longtime former Maverick Michael Finley his first championship. Many Spurs teammates claimed that the drive to win this season was partially to give Finley his first championship, especially since Finley had lost a bitter-fought series to his longtime team the year previous.

Worth noting in a regular season meeting between the two rivals in April 2007, a game that the Spurs won 91–86, Tim Duncan suffered his first career ejection for supposedly laughing while sitting on the bench. Joey Crawford, the referee who ejected Duncan, allegedly asked Duncan to a fight which led to the longtime ref's season-ending suspension. As Duncan was heading into the locker room, American Airlines Center erupted into a huge cheer, applauding Duncan's ejection. The game saw chippy play, with Jerry Stackhouse and Manu Ginóbili getting into an altercation after a rebound.

In the 2009 NBA Playoffs, the Mavericks and Spurs squared off again in the first round. The Spurs and Mavericks split the first two games in San Antonio, but Dallas defeated the Spurs in games 3 and 4, both in Dallas. The Mavericks then went on to close out the series and eliminated the Spurs at the AT&T Center in San Antonio.

In 2010, the Dallas Mavericks matched up against the San Antonio Spurs in the first round of the Western Conference Playoffs. Although the Mavericks managed to obtain the number two seed, they were defeated by the Spurs in six games.

During the 2011 playoffs, a role reversal of sorts occurred between the two rivals, when the top seeded Spurs were defeated by the eighth seeded Memphis Grizzlies, the first time an eight seed defeated a one seed since the infamous Mavs–Warriors series of 2007. In addition, the Mavericks defeated the LeBron James–led Miami Heat in the NBA Finals, similar again to how the 2007 Spurs defeated a LeBron James–led Cleveland Cavaliers team in the Finals.

The Mavericks were swept in the 2012–13 NBA season by the Spurs for the first time since the 1997–98 NBA season, Tim Duncan's rookie season. In their last match up of the season, San Antonio escaped with a 92–91 victory over Dallas when a Vince Carter 3-point attempt bounced off the rim at the buzzer. With the win the Spurs clinched a playoff spot for the 16th straight season, currently the longest streak in the NBA. San Antonio also reached 50 wins for the 14th straight season, the longest streak in NBA history.

In the 2013–14 season, the Spurs once again swept the Mavs in the regular season, giving them nine straight victories. In addition, an overtime loss to the Memphis Grizzlies on April 16, 2014, ensured that the Mavericks would face the Spurs once again in the 2014 NBA playoffs, where the Mavs would be the eighth seed and San Antonio the first. In Game 1 in San Antonio, the game was relatively close. Dallas managed to reach an 81–71 lead in the fourth quarter, but the Spurs rallied back and took Game 1 at home, 85–90. However, the Mavs managed to force 22 turnovers in Game 2 to rout the Spurs 113–92, splitting the first two games before the series went to Dallas. In Game 3, Manu Ginóbili managed to hit a shot that put the Spurs up 108–106 with 1.7 left, but a buzzer beater by Vince Carter gave the Mavs the victory, putting them up 2–1 in the series. The Spurs took Game 4 in Dallas 93–89 and later Game 5 at home 109–103, giving them a 3–2 lead. Luckily, the Mavs avoided elimination in Game 6 at home by rallying in the fourth quarter, winning 111–113. The Spurs won game 7 119–96, eliminating the Mavericks in the first round.

== Players played for both teams ==
- DeJuan Blair
- Michael Finley
- Drew Gooden
- Avery Johnson
- Dennis Rodman
- Nick Van Exel
- Harrison Barnes
- David Lee
- Josh Richardson
- Boban Marjanović

== Season-by-season results ==
Dallas Mavericks vs. San Antonio Spurs Season–by–Season Results
1980s (Mavericks, 33–26)

| Season | Season series | | at Dallas Mavericks | at San Antonio Spurs | Overall series | Notes |
|---|---|---|---|---|---|---|
| 1980–81 | Spurs | 5–1 | Spurs, 2–1 | Spurs, 3–0 | Spurs; 5–1 | Dallas Mavericks join the NBA as an expansion team and are placed in the Western Conference and the Midwest Division. Spurs are moved to the Midwest Division, becoming in-state divisional rivals with the Mavericks. |
| 1981–82 | Spurs | 5–1 | Spurs, 3–0 | Spurs, 2–1 | Spurs; 10–2 | |
| 1982–83 | Spurs | 4–2 | Spurs, 2–1 | Spurs, 2–1 | Spurs; 14–4 | |
| 1983–84 | Mavericks | 4–2 | Mavericks, 3–0 | Spurs, 2–1 | Spurs; 16–8 | |
| 1984–85 | Mavericks | 4–2 | Mavericks, 3–0 | Spurs, 2–1 | Spurs; 18–12 | |
| 1985–86 | Mavericks | 4–2 | Mavericks, 2–1 | Mavericks, 2–1 | Spurs; 20–16 | |
| 1986–87 | Mavericks | 4–2 | Mavericks, 3–0 | Spurs, 2–1 | Spurs; 22–20 | Mavericks win the Midwest Division for the first time. |
| 1987–88 | Mavericks | 5–1 | Mavericks, 3–0 | Mavericks, 2–1 | Mavericks; 25–23 | |
| 1988–89 | Mavericks | 5–1 | Mavericks, 3–0 | Mavericks, 2–1 | Mavericks; 30–24 | On January 27, 1989, Mavericks beat the Spurs 126–82, their largest victory against the Spurs with a 44–point differential. |
| 1989–90 | Mavericks | 3–2 | Mavericks, 2–1 | Tie, 1–1 | Mavericks; 33–26 | |

1990s (Spurs, 36–9)

| Season | Season series | | at Dallas Mavericks | at San Antonio Spurs | Overall series | Notes |
|---|---|---|---|---|---|---|
| 1990–91 | Spurs | 4–1 | Tie, 1–1 | Spurs, 3–0 | Mavericks; 34–30 | Last season Mavericks held the overall series record. |
| 1991–92 | Spurs | 5–0 | Spurs, 3–0 | Spurs, 2–0 | Spurs; 35–34 | On November 1, 1991, Spurs beat the Mavericks 140–99, their largest victory against the Mavericks with a 41–point differential and their most points scored in a game against the Mavericks. |
| 1992–93 | Spurs | 5–0 | Spurs, 2–0 | Spurs, 3–0 | Spurs; 40–34 | Last season Spurs played at HemisFair Arena. |
| 1993–94 | Spurs | 5–0 | Spurs, 3–0 | Spurs, 2–0 | Spurs; 45–34 | Spurs open up Alamodome. Spurs win 16 games in a row against the Mavericks and 10 straight home meetings against the Mavericks. |
| 1994–95 | Spurs | 3–2 | Spurs, 2–0 | Mavericks, 2–1 | Spurs; 48–36 | Spurs finish with the best record in the league (62–20). |
| 1995–96 | Tie | 2–2 | Spurs, 2–0 | Mavericks, 2–0 | Spurs; 50–38 | Spurs win 12 straight road games against the Mavericks. |
| 1996–97 | Spurs | 3–1 | Tie, 1–1 | Spurs, 2–0 | Spurs; 53–39 | |
| 1997–98 | Spurs | 4–0 | Spurs, 2–0 | Spurs, 2–0 | Spurs; 57–39 | Spurs draft Tim Duncan. |
| 1998–99 | Spurs | 3–1 | Tie, 1–1 | Spurs, 2–0 | Spurs; 60–40 | Dirk Nowitzki debuts for the Mavericks. Spurs finish with the best record in the league (37–13). Spurs win 1999 NBA Finals, their first NBA championship. |
| 1999–2000 | Tie | 2–2 | Tie, 1–1 | Tie, 1–1 | Spurs; 62–42 | |

2000s (Spurs, 33–30)

| Season | Season series | | at Dallas Mavericks | at San Antonio Spurs | Overall series | Notes |
|---|---|---|---|---|---|---|
| 2000–01 | Spurs | 3–1 | Tie, 1–1 | Spurs, 2–0 | Spurs; 65–43 | Spurs finish with the best record in the league (58–24). |
| 2001 Western Conference Semifinals | Spurs | 4–1 | Tie, 1–1 | Spurs, 3–0 | Spurs; 69–44 | 1st postseason series. Mavericks play their final home games at Reunion Arena. |
| 2001–02 | Spurs | 3–1 | Spurs, 2–0 | Tie, 1–1 | Spurs; 72–45 | Mavericks open American Airlines Center. Last season Spurs played at Alamodome. |
| 2002–03 | Tie | 2–2 | Tie, 1–1 | Tie, 1–1 | Spurs; 74–47 | Spurs open up SBC Center (now known as Frost Bank Center). Spurs finish with the best record in the league (60–22). |
| 2003 Western Conference Finals | Spurs | 4–2 | Spurs, 3–0 | Mavericks, 2–1 | Spurs; 78–49 | 2nd postseason series. Spurs go on to win 2003 NBA Finals. |
| 2003–04 | Mavericks | 3–1 | Mavericks, 2–0 | Tie, 1–1 | Spurs; 79–52 | Mavericks win the season series and finish with a winning record at home against the Spurs for the first time since the 1989 season. |
| 2004–05 | Spurs | 3–1 | Tie, 1–1 | Spurs, 2–0 | Spurs; 82–53 | As part of new realignments, Mavericks and Spurs were moved to the new Southwest Division. Spurs win 2005 NBA Finals. |
| 2005–06 | Tie | 2–2 | Tie, 1–1 | Tie, 1–1 | Spurs; 84–55 | |
| 2006 Western Conference Semifinals | Mavericks | 4–3 | Mavericks, 2–1 | Tie, 2–2 | Spurs; 87–59 | 3rd postseason series. Mavericks become the 5th NBA road team to win a game 7 after leading the series 3–1. Mavericks go on to lose 2006 NBA Finals. |
| 2006–07 | Mavericks | 3–1 | Tie, 1–1 | Mavericks, 2–0 | Spurs; 88–62 | Mavericks win the Southwest Division for the first time. Mavericks finish with the best record in the league (67–15). Spurs win 2007 NBA Finals. |
| 2007–08 | Spurs | 3–1 | Tie, 1–1 | Spurs, 2–0 | Spurs; 91–63 | |
| 2008–09 | Tie | 2–2 | Tie, 1–1 | Tie, 1–1 | Spurs; 93–65 | |
| 2009 Western Conference First Round | Mavericks | 4–1 | Mavericks, 2–0 | Mavericks, 2–1 | Spurs; 94–69 | 4th postseason series. |
| 2009–10 | Mavericks | 3–1 | Mavericks, 2–0 | Tie, 1–1 | Spurs; 95–72 | Mavericks win the Southwest Division. |

2010s (Spurs, 38–15)

| Season | Season series | | at Dallas Mavericks | at San Antonio Spurs | Overall series | Notes |
|---|---|---|---|---|---|---|
| 2010 Western Conference First Round | Spurs | 4–2 | Mavericks, 2–1 | Spurs, 3–0 | Spurs; 99–74 | 5th postseason series. |
| 2010–11 | Spurs | 3–1 | Spurs, 2–0 | Tie, 1–1 | Spurs; 102–75 | Spurs record their 100th win against the Mavericks. Mavericks win 2011 NBA Finals, their first NBA championship. |
| 2011–12 | Tie | 2–2 | Mavericks, 2–0 | Spurs, 2–0 | Spurs; 104–77 | |
| 2012–13 | Spurs | 4–0 | Spurs, 2–0 | Spurs, 2–0 | Spurs; 108–77 | Spurs' first season series sweep against the Mavericks since the 1997 season. Spurs lose 2013 NBA Finals. |
| 2013–14 | Spurs | 4–0 | Spurs, 2–0 | Spurs, 2–0 | Spurs; 112–77 | Spurs finish with the best record in the league (62–20). |
| 2014 Western Conference First Round | Spurs | 4–3 | Mavericks, 2–1 | Spurs, 3–1 | Spurs; 116–80 | 6th postseason series. Spurs win 10 games in a row against the Mavericks. Spurs go on to win 2014 NBA Finals. |
| 2014–15 | Tie | 2–2 | Mavericks, 2–0 | Spurs, 2–0 | Spurs; 118–82 | |
| 2015–16 | Spurs | 4–0 | Spurs, 2–0 | Spurs, 2–0 | Spurs; 122–82 | Final season with Tim Duncan as a Spur. |
| 2016–17 | Spurs | 3–1 | Spurs, 2–0 | Tie, 1–1 | Spurs; 125–83 | |
| 2017–18 | Spurs | 3–1 | Tie, 1–1 | Spurs, 2–0 | Spurs; 128–84 | |
| 2018–19 | Spurs | 4–0 | Spurs, 2–0 | Spurs, 2–0 | Spurs; 132–84 | |
| 2019–20 | Mavericks | 3–1 | Mavericks, 2–0 | Tie, 1–1 | Spurs; 133–87 | Mavericks' first season series win against the Spurs since the 2009 season. |

2020s (Mavericks, 16–7)

| Season | Season series | | at Dallas Mavericks | at San Antonio Spurs | Overall series | Notes |
|---|---|---|---|---|---|---|
| 2020–21 | Mavericks | 2–1 | Tie, 1–1 | Mavericks, 1–0 | Spurs; 134–89 | Mavericks finish with a winning record at San Antonio for the first time since the 2009 Western Conference First Round. Mavericks win the Southwest Division. |
| 2021–22 | Mavericks | 4–0 | Mavericks, 2–0 | Mavericks, 2–0 | Spurs; 134–93 | Mavericks record their first season series sweep against the Spurs. |
| 2022–23 | Mavericks | 3–1 | Tie, 1–1 | Mavericks, 2–0 | Spurs; 135–96 | |
| 2023–24 | Mavericks | 4–0 | Mavericks, 2–0 | Mavericks, 2–0 | Spurs; 135–100 | Mavericks record their 100th win against the Spurs. On December 23, 2023, Mavericks beat the Spurs 144–119, their most points scored in a game against the Spurs. Spurs draft Victor Wembanyama. Mavericks win Willis Reed Trophy. Mavericks lose 2024 NBA Finals. |
| 2024–25 | Mavericks | 3–1 | Mavericks, 2–0 | Tie, 1–1 | Spurs; 136–103 | Final season with Luka Doncic as a Maverick. |
| 2025–26 | Spurs | 4–0 | Spurs, 2–0 | Spurs, 2–0 | Spurs; 140–103 | Spurs lose 2025 NBA Cup championship game. Spurs lose 2026 NBA Finals. |
| 2026–27 | Tie | 0-0 | October 24th, 2026 and February 9th, 2027 | November 4th, 2026 and March 19th, 2027 | Spurs; 140–103 | |

Summary of Results

| Season | Season series | | at Dallas Mavericks | at San Antonio Spurs | Notes |
|---|---|---|---|---|---|
| Regular season games | Spurs | Spurs, 120–87 | Spurs, 53–51 | Spurs, 67–36 | |
| Postseason games | Spurs | 20–16 | Mavericks, 9–7 | Spurs, 13–7 | |
| Postseason series | Spurs | 4–2 | Spurs, 1–0 | Spurs, 3–2 | Western Conference First Round: 2009, 2010, 2014; Western Conference Semifinals: 2001, 2006; Western Conference Finals: 2003 |
| Regular and postseason | Spurs | 140–103 | Tie, 60–60 | Spurs, 80–43 | |
