= List of NBA rivalries =

Throughout 81 seasons, the National Basketball Association (NBA) has had many intense rivalries. This article lists some of the famous rivalries in the NBA. Rivalries are classified into three primary groups; intradivisional, interdivisional, and interconference.

Intradivisional rivalries comprise games between opponents in the same division. Since the 2004–05 NBA season, there are 30 teams in six divisions of five teams each. Each team plays each division opponent four times during the regular season (twice at home, twice away) for a total of 16 games out of 82 total regular season games.

Interdivisional rivalries comprise games between opponents in different divisions but within the same conference. A team plays against each team from the other two divisions in its conference either three or four times. The total interdivisional games an NBA team plays is 36. Conference games are often important, as a team's record in common games, as well as its overall record against its conference, are sometimes used as tiebreakers for playoff seeding at the end of the regular season. Also, many regular season opponents meet again in the playoffs, and the result of a regular season game can determine the team that will have home-court advantage in the playoff series.

Interconference rivalries comprise games between opponents in different conferences. A team plays each opponent from the other conference in one home game and one away game. The total interconference games an NBA team plays is 30.

== Eastern Conference ==
=== Atlantic Division ===
- 76ers–Celtics rivalry
- Celtics–Knicks rivalry
- Knicks–Nets rivalry

=== Central Division ===
- Bulls–Cavaliers rivalry
- Bulls–Pistons rivalry
- Pacers–Pistons rivalry

=== Southeast Division ===
- Heat–Magic rivalry

=== Interdivisional ===
- Bulls–Knicks rivalry
- Celtics–Heat rivalry
- Celtics–Pistons rivalry
- Heat–Knicks rivalry
- Knicks–Pacers rivalry

== Western Conference ==
=== Northwest Division ===
- Jazz–Nuggets rivalry
- Nuggets–Timberwolves rivalry

=== Pacific Division ===
- Kings–Lakers rivalry
- Kings–Warriors rivalry
- Lakers–Clippers rivalry
- Lakers–Suns rivalry
- Lakers–Warriors rivalry
- SuperSonics–Trail Blazers rivalry (defunct/inactive)

=== Southwest Division ===
- Mavericks–Rockets rivalry
- Mavericks–Spurs rivalry
- Rockets–Spurs rivalry

=== Interdivisional ===
- Jazz–Rockets rivalry
- Lakers–Spurs rivalry
- Spurs–Suns rivalry

== Interconference rivalries ==
- Cavaliers–Warriors rivalry
- Celtics–Lakers rivalry
- Lakers–Pistons rivalry

== See also ==
- Major League Baseball rivalries
- Major League Soccer rivalries
- National Football League rivalries
- National Hockey League rivalries
