= Nuggets–Timberwolves rivalry =

National Basketball Association rivalry

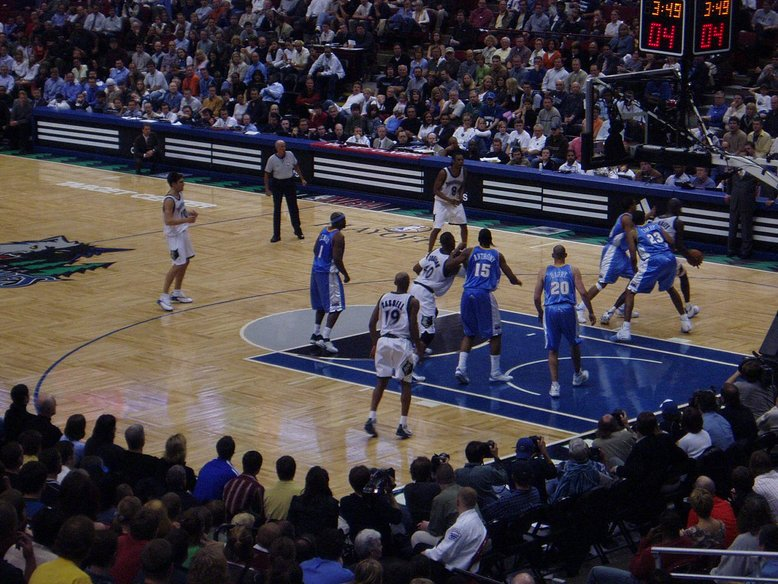
- Nuggets vs. Timberwolves game at the Target Center during the 2004 Western Conference First Round

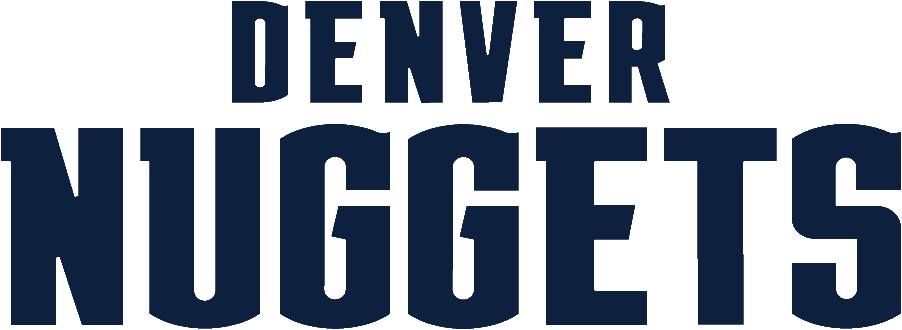
- Denver Nuggets Minnesota Timberwolves
- First meeting: November 22, 1989; Nuggets 96, Timberwolves 93
- Latest meeting: April 30, 2026; Timberwolves 110, Nuggets 98
- Next meeting: December 28, 2026

Statistics
- All-time series: 102–74 (DEN)
- Regular season series: 92–61 (DEN)
- Postseason results: 13–10 (MIN)
- Longest win streak: DEN, 12 (1994–1996, 2018–2021); MIN, 8 (2002–2004)
- Current win streak: MIN W1

Postseason history
- 2004 Western Conference First Round: Timberwolves won, 4–1; 2023 Western Conference First Round: Nuggets won, 4–1; 2024 Western Conference Semifinals: Timberwolves won, 4–3; 2026 Western Conference First Round: Timberwolves won, 4–2

The Nuggets–Timberwolves rivalry is a National Basketball Association (NBA) rivalry between the Denver Nuggets and the Minnesota Timberwolves.

Following the relocation of the Minneapolis Lakers to Los Angeles, Minnesota was without an NBA team until the 1989 season. The NBA granted one of its four new expansion teams to original owners Harvey Ratner and Marv Wolfenson, leading to the establishment of the Timberwolves for the 1989 season. The Timberwolves were placed in the Midwest Division, where they competed alongside the Denver Nuggets. While the two teams had a playoff meeting in 2004, their rivalry did not truly intensify until the 2020s. During this decade, the Nuggets and Timberwolves frequently clashed for the divisional title and in the playoffs.

== History ==
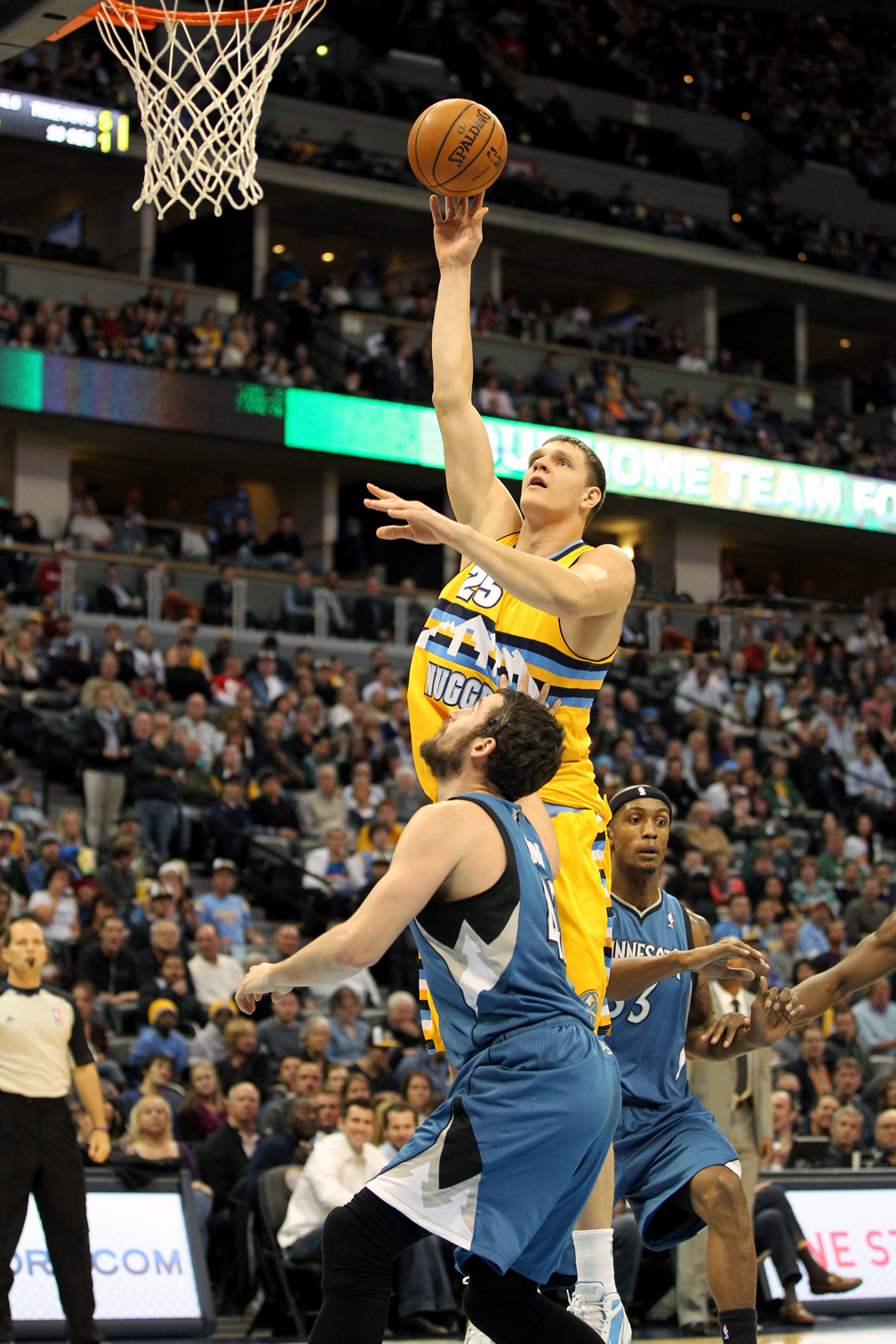
Nuggets' Timofey Mozgov attempting a shot over Timberwolves' Kevin Love during a regular season game at Pepsi Center in November 2013.

=== 2004: First playoff meeting ===
In the 2003 season, the Timberwolves were still in search of their first playoff series victory, despite their consistent playoff appearances for seven consecutive seasons. To overcome this obstacle, they made a significant trade for Latrell Sprewell, a 4-time All-Star guard, and Sam Cassell. These two players, along with the All-Star Kevin Garnett, played a crucial role in leading the Timberwolves to secure the number one seed in the Western Conference, marking a historic first for the franchise. On the other hand, the Nuggets were determined to put an end to their eight-year postseason absence. Led by the newly drafted Carmelo Anthony, the Nuggets finished with a 43–39 record, securing the eighth seed and marking their return to the playoffs for the first time since the 1995 season. In the first playoff meeting in the rivalry, the top-seeded Timberwolves easily defeated the eight-seed Nuggets 4 games to 1, marking the Timberwolves first playoff series win in franchise history.

=== 2017: Play-in game to end a postseason drought ===
In the 2017 NBA season, the Timberwolves aimed to end a thirteen-year postseason drought, while the Nuggets were looking to break a four-year playoff drought. On April 9, 2018, both teams had matching records of 46–35, leading to a decisive showdown on April 11. The victor would secure the last playoff spot, while the defeated team would be eliminated from contention.

In the first final-day play-in game in the NBA in 21 years, the Timberwolves held a lead of 10 points in the second quarter. With 4:26 remaining in regulation, Timberwolves guard Jeff Teague's 3-pointer extended their lead to 99–91. However, the Nuggets mounted a comeback, going on a 10–2 run to tie the game at 101-101 and force overtime. In the extra period, the Nuggets took a 106–105 lead, but then the Timberwolves shut out the Nuggets to secure a 112–106 victory. This win ended their thirteen-year postseason drought, eliminated the Nuggets, and marked their return to the playoffs for the first time since the 2003 season.

=== 2020s: Rivalry intensifies ===
In the 2020 season, the Timberwolves decided to dismiss head coach Ryan Saunders and appointed Chris Finch as their new head coach. Before this role, Finch served as an assistant coach for the Nuggets during the 2016–17 season. In the 2022 season, the Timberwolves secured Tim Connelly as their president, signing him to a lucrative 5-year, $40 million contract. Connelly assumed the same position he held with the Nuggets. To fill the void left by Connelly in the front office, the Nuggets promoted Calvin Booth, who had been recruited from the Timberwolves in 2017.

Despite acquiring Rudy Gobert in the offseason and aiming for a championship, the Timberwolves faced significant struggles in the 2022 NBA season. Although their defense performed adequately, ranking 10th out of 30 teams in Def Rtg, their offense struggled to generate points, scoring only 113.3 points per 100 possessions, placing them 23rd among all teams. Consequently, they faced difficulties in consistently winning games. This resulted in many sports analysts and fans labeling them as one of the most disappointing teams of that season. On the other hand, the Nuggets excelled throughout the season, clinching the best record in the Western Conference at 53-29 for the first time in franchise history. The Timberwolves managed to secure a 42–40 record, earning a spot in the play-in tournament. After losing to the Los Angeles Lakers but defeating the Oklahoma City Thunder, they made it to the playoffs as the 8th seed, setting up a playoff series against the top-seeded Nuggets. The Timberwolves managed to prevent a sweep in the 2023 playoffs by winning game 4 during overtime. However, the Nuggets maintained their dominance throughout the series, ultimately winning 4 out of the 5 games. The Nuggets went on to win in the NBA Finals against the Miami Heat, clinching their first NBA Finals championship in franchise history after 47 seasons in the NBA.

The Nuggets began the 2023 season as the defending champions, while the Timberwolves rebounded from a disappointing previous season and emerged as stronger contenders. Throughout the season, these two teams, along with the Oklahoma City Thunder, battled for the Northwest divisional title. In the final game of the season, all three teams had identical 56–25 records and were in contention for the Northwest division title. The Thunder and Nuggets emerged victorious in their games, while the Timberwolves suffered a defeat. As a result of tiebreakers, the Thunder claimed the division title, with the Nuggets and Timberwolves securing the 2nd and 3rd seeds, respectively. In the 2024 playoffs, the Timberwolves achieved their first-ever franchise sweep, and their first playoff series win in 20 years by defeating the Phoenix Suns, while the Nuggets emerged victorious over the Los Angeles Lakers. This paved the way for an exciting playoff series between the two teams in the Semifinals.

On Christmas Day 2025, the Nuggets defeated the Timberwolves 142–138 in overtime. The Nuggets held a 15-point lead late in the fourth quarter before the Timberwolves came back to tie the game at 115–115. In the overtime, Nuggets big man Nikola Jokić scored an NBA-record 18 points, finishing with a 56-point triple-double to lead Denver to the win.

==== 2024 Western Conference Semifinals ====
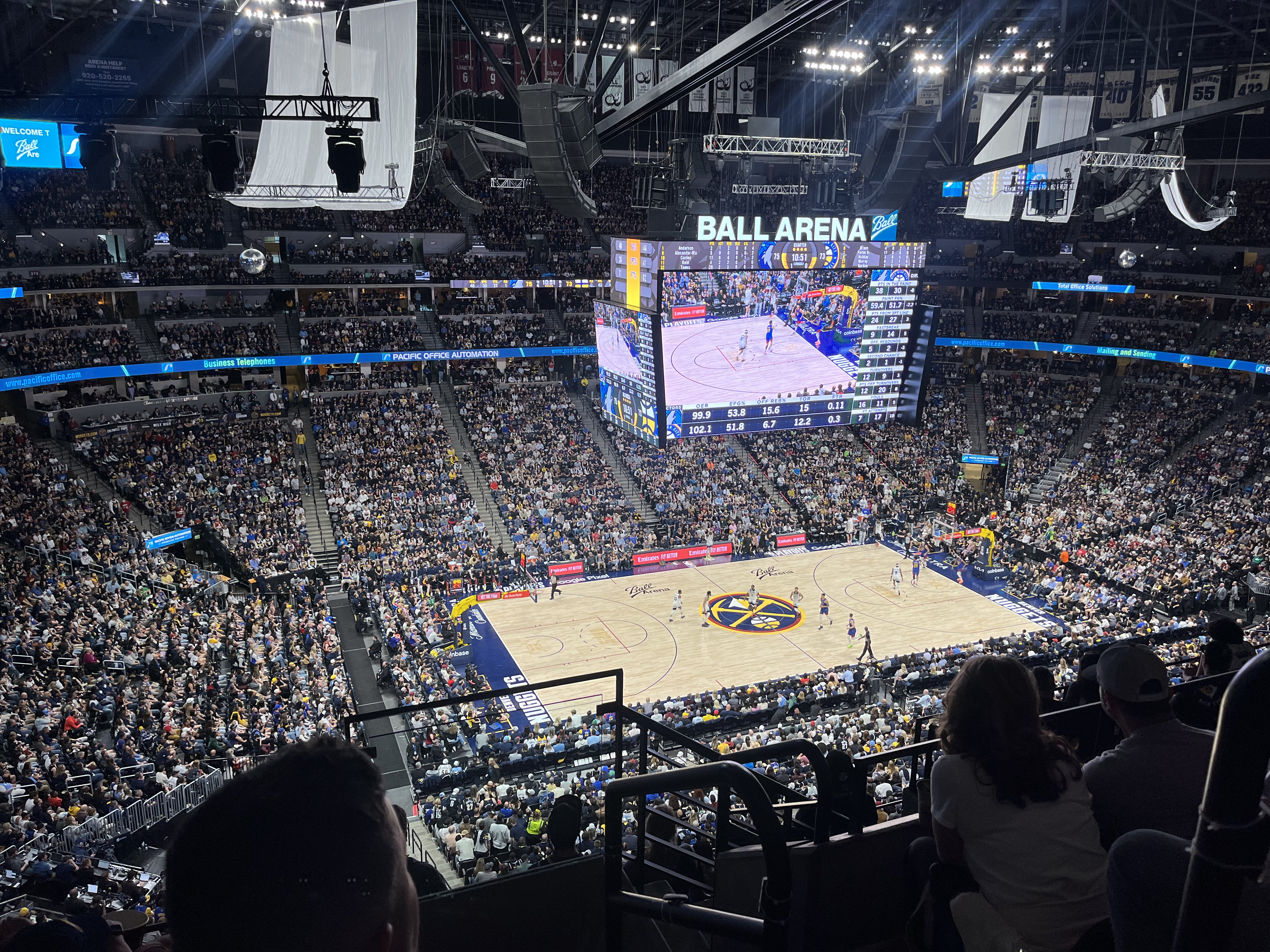
Game 1 of Nuggets vs. Timberwolves at the Ball Arena during the 2024 Western Conference Semifinals.

The Timberwolves were off to a strong start in Denver, securing victories in the first two games with a defensive display and Anthony Edwards consistently scoring over 20 points in each match. However, the Nuggets swiftly retaliated by claiming victory in the subsequent two games held in Minneapolis. As the series returned to Denver for the fifth game, Nikola Jokić's remarkable 40-point performance propelled the Nuggets to victory, granting them a three-game winning streak and the lead in the series. In game six in Minneapolis, the Timberwolves delivered a dominant performance against the defending champions, ultimately emerging victorious with a resounding 115–70 scoreline. The Nuggets suffered their third-largest defeat in franchise history, matching a 45-point margin; this also set a dual record for the Nuggets' biggest playoff loss and the Timberwolves' biggest playoff win in franchise history. The series was deadlocked at 3-3, leading to a decisive game 7 in Denver. During the seventh game, the Timberwolves were behind by 20 points in the 3rd quarter, with a score of 58–38. Despite the deficit, they managed to go on a 28–9 run, reducing the gap to 67–66 by the end of the quarter. The Timberwolves seized and maintained the lead, ultimately triumphing 98–90. For the Timberwolves, this victory marked the largest comeback (20 points) in game 7 history, eliminated the reigning champions Nuggets, and advanced them to the Western Conference Finals for the first time since the 2003 season. When asked on if he feels there is a budding rivalry between themselves and Minnesota. Jokic responded "I think they're built to beat us."

==== 2026 Western Conference First Round ====
The Nuggets and Timberwolves met in the first round of the 2026 playoffs after Denver finished the regular season as the third seed and Minnesota as the sixth seed. After Denver took Game 1, Minnesota surged to a 3–1 series lead fueled by Rudy Gobert's defense on Nikola Jokić and Ayo Dosunmu's historic 43-point performance off the bench in Game 4. The series turned volatile in the closing moments of Game 4 when Jaden McDaniels scored a layup in "garbage time" that broke an unwritten rule, sparking a physical altercation with Jokić that resulted in the ejections of Jokić and Julius Randle. Minnesota's Donte DiVincenzo and Anthony Edwards were also injured during the series. Jokić recorded 27 points, 16 assists, and 12 rebounds for his 23rd career playoff triple-double, as the Nuggets avoided elimination in Game 5. However, the Timberwolves eliminated the Nuggets in Game 6 and advanced to the semifinals, despite also losing Dosunmu to injury.

== Season-by-season results ==
Denver Nuggets vs. Minnesota Timberwolves Season-by-Season Results
1989–1990s (Nuggets 30–20)

Season	Season series		at Denver Nuggets	at Minnesota Timberwolves	Overall series	Notes
1989–90	Nuggets	5–0	Nuggets, 3–0	Nuggets, 2–0	Nuggets; 5–0	Minnesota Timberwolves join the NBA as an expansion team and are placed in the Western Conference and the Midwest Division, becoming divisional rivals with the Nuggets. This marks the return of an NBA team based in Minnesota since the Lakers played there during the 1959–60 season.
1990–91	Nuggets	3–2	Nuggets, 3–0	Timberwolves, 2–0	Nuggets; 8–2	
1991–92	Timberwolves	3–2	Tie 1–1	Timberwolves, 2–1	Nuggets; 10–5	
1992–93	Nuggets	3–2	Nuggets, 3–0	Timberwolves, 2–0	Nuggets; 13–7	
1993–94	Nuggets	4–1	Nuggets, 2–0	Nuggets, 2–1	Nuggets; 17–8	
1994–95	Nuggets	6–0	Nuggets, 3–0	Nuggets, 3–0	Nuggets; 23–8	
1995–96	Nuggets	4–0	Nuggets, 2–0	Nuggets, 2–0	Nuggets; 27–8	Nuggets win 12 games in a row against the Timberwolves. Kevin Garnett makes his debut for the Timberwolves.
1996–97	Timberwolves	4–0	Timberwolves, 2–0	Timberwolves, 2–0	Nuggets; 27–12	Timberwolves sweep the season series for the first time.
1997–98	Timberwolves	3–1	Tie, 1–1	Timberwolves, 2–0	Nuggets; 28–15	
1998–99	Timberwolves	3–0	Timberwolves, 2–0	Timberwolves, 1–0	Nuggets; 28–18	
1999–2000	Tie	2–2	Tie, 1–1	Tie, 1–1	Nuggets; 30–20	

2000s (Nuggets, 24–21)

Season	Season series		at Denver Nuggets	at Minnesota Timberwolves	Overall series	Notes
2000–01	Tie	2–2	Tie, 1–1	Tie, 1–1	Nuggets; 32–22	
2001–02	Tie	2–2	Tie, 1–1	Tie, 1–1	Nuggets; 34–24	
2002–03	Timberwolves	4–0	Timberwolves, 2–0	Timberwolves, 2–0	Nuggets; 34–28	
2003–04	Timberwolves	3–1	Tie, 1–1	Timberwolves, 2–0	Nuggets; 35–31	Timberwolves win 8 games in a row against the Nuggets. Carmelo Anthony makes his debut for the Nuggets.
2004 Western Conference First Round	Timberwolves	4–1	Tie, 1–1	Timberwolves, 3–0	Nuggets; 36–35	1st postseason series.
2004–05	Tie	2–2	Tie, 1–1	Tie, 1–1	Nuggets; 38–37	Nuggets and Timberwolves are placed in the newly formed Northwest Division.
2005–06	Nuggets	3–1	Nuggets, 2–0	Tie, 1–1	Nuggets; 41–38	
2006–07	Tie	2–2	Tie, 1–1	Tie, 1–1	Nuggets; 43–40	Kevin Garnett traded to the Boston Celtics after this season.
2007–08	Nuggets	4–0	Nuggets, 2–0	Nuggets, 2–0	Nuggets; 47–40	
2008–09	Nuggets	4–0	Nuggets, 2–0	Nuggets, 2–0	Nuggets; 51–40	
2009–10	Nuggets	3–1	Tie, 1–1	Nuggets, 2–0	Nuggets; 54–41	Nuggets win 10 games in a row against the Timberwolves.

2010s (Nuggets, 28–12)

Season	Season series		at Denver Nuggets	at Minnesota Timberwolves	Overall series	Notes
2010–11	Nuggets	4–0	Nuggets, 2–0	Nuggets, 2–0	Nuggets; 58–41	Carmelo Anthony traded to the New York Knicks between the third and final game of this series.
2011–12	Nuggets	3–1	Nuggets, 2–0	Tie, 1–1	Nuggets; 61–42	
2012–13	Tie	2–2	Tie, 1–1	Tie, 1–1	Nuggets; 63–44	
2013–14	Tie	2–2	Tie, 1–1	Tie, 1–1	Nuggets; 65–46	
2014–15	Nuggets	3–1	Tie, 1–1	Nuggets, 2–0	Nuggets; 68–47	Kevin Garnett traded back to Timberwolves before the final game of the series.
2015–16	Nuggets	3–1	Tie, 1–1	Nuggets, 2–0	Nuggets; 71–48	Nikola Jokić makes his debut for the Nuggets. Karl-Anthony Towns makes his debut for the Timberwolves. Kevin Garnett retires after the season.
2016–17	Tie	2–2	Tie, 1–1	Tie, 1–1	Nuggets; 73–50	
2017–18	Timberwolves	3–1	Tie, 1–1	Timberwolves, 2–0	Nuggets; 74–53	Timberwolves have the better record at home in the regular season for the first time since the 2003 season. In the last game of the season that determined who goes to the playoffs, Timberwolves defeat the Nuggets 112–106 in overtime, snapping a thirteen-season playoff drought and eliminating the Nuggets from the playoffs.
2018–19	Nuggets	4–0	Nuggets, 2–0	Nuggets, 2–0	Nuggets; 78–53	
2019–20	Nuggets	4–0	Nuggets, 2–0	Nuggets, 2–0	Nuggets; 82–53	

2020s (Timberwolves, 19–17)

Season	Season series		at Denver Nuggets	at Minnesota Timberwolves	Overall series	Notes
2020–21	Nuggets	3–0	Nuggets, 1–0	Nuggets, 2–0	Nuggets; 85–53	Anthony Edwards makes his debut for the Timberwolves.
2021–22	Timberwolves	3–1	Timberwolves, 2–0	Tie, 1–1	Nuggets; 86–56	Nuggets win 12 games in a row against the Timberwolves. Timberwolves finish with a winning record in Denver for the first time since the 2002–03 season.
2022–23	Tie	2–2	Nuggets, 2–0	Timberwolves, 2–0	Nuggets; 88–58	
2023 Western Conference First Round	Nuggets	4–1	Nuggets, 3–0	Tie, 1–1	Nuggets; 92–59	2nd postseason series. Nuggets go on to win 2023 NBA Finals.
2023–24	Tie	2–2	Tie, 1–1	Tie, 1–1	Nuggets; 94–61	
2024 Western Conference Semifinals	Timberwolves	4–3	Timberwolves, 3–1	Nuggets, 2–1	Nuggets; 97–65	3rd postseason series. In game 7, Timberwolves pull off the biggest comeback (20 points) in game 7 history to defeat the Nuggets. Karl-Anthony Towns traded to the New York Knicks after the season.
2024–25	Timberwolves	4–0	Timberwolves, 2–0	Timberwolves, 2–0	Nuggets; 97–69	Timberwolves sweep the regular-season series vs. Denver for the first time since the 2002–03 season.
2025–26	Nuggets	3–1	Tie, 1–1	Nuggets, 2–0	Nuggets; 100–70	One game was played on Christmas.
2026 Western Conference First Round	Timberwolves	4–2	Nuggets, 2–1	Timberwolves, 3–0	Nuggets; 102–74	4th postseason series.
2026–27	Tie	0-0	December 28th, 2026 and March 7th, 2027	December 31st, 2026 and January 27th, 2027	Nuggets; 102–74	

Summary of Results

Season	Season series		at Denver Nuggets	at Minnesota Timberwolves	Notes
Regular season games	Nuggets	Nuggets, 92–61	Nuggets, 49–27	Nuggets, 43–34	
Postseason games	Timberwolves	13–10	Nuggets, 7–5	Timberwolves, 8–3	
Postseason series	Timberwolves	3–1	Timberwolves, 2–1	Timberwolves, 1–0	Western Conference First Round: 2004, 2023, 2026; Western Conference Semifinals: 2024
Regular and postseason	Nuggets	Nuggets, 102–74	Nuggets, 56–32	Nuggets, 46–42	

== See also ==
- National Basketball Association rivalries
