= Jazz–Nuggets rivalry =

National Basketball Association rivalry

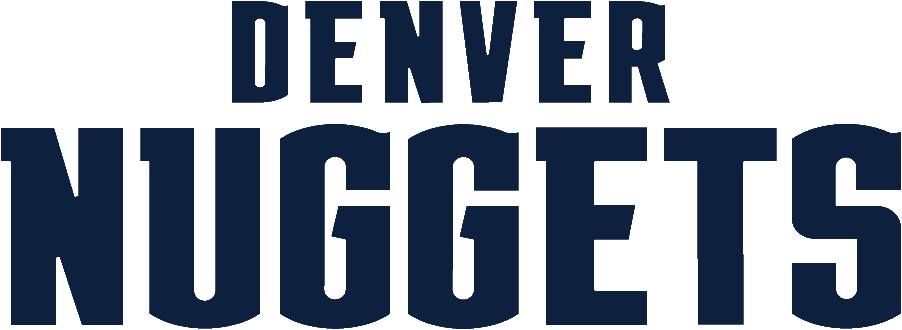
- Utah Jazz Denver Nuggets
- First meeting: December 5, 1976; Nuggets 117, Jazz 105
- Latest meeting: April 1, 2026; Nuggets 130, Jazz 117
- Next meeting: November 27, 2026

Statistics
- Total meetings: 251
- All-time series: 139–112 (UTA)
- Regular season series: 124–97 (UTA)
- Postseason results: 15–15
- Longest win streak: DEN W10
- Current win streak: DEN W10

Postseason history
- 1984 Western Conference First Round: Jazz won, 3–2; 1985 Western Conference Semifinals: Nuggets won, 4–1; 1994 Western Conference Semifinals: Jazz won, 4–3; 2010 Western Conference First Round: Jazz won, 4–2; 2020 Western Conference First Round: Nuggets won, 4–3

Locations of the Utah Jazz and Denver Nuggets.

The Jazz–Nuggets rivalry is a National Basketball Association (NBA) rivalry between the Utah Jazz and the Denver Nuggets. The rivalry dates back to the 1976–77 NBA season, when the Nuggets joined the NBA as a result of the ABA–NBA merger. The rivalry is notable in that it features the only two NBA teams based in the Rocky Mountains.

== Season-by-season results ==
=== 1970–1976: Denver–Utah ABA rivalry ===
Prior to joining the NBA, the Denver Nuggets were an ABA franchise from 1967–1976, and joining them in the league was the Utah Stars, a franchise that started as the Anaheim Amigos then renamed themselves the Los Angeles Stars, before moving to Utah in 1970. In the ABA, the two franchises formed a rivalry due to their proximity. The Nuggets won ABA championships in 1970 and 1975, while the Stars won in 1971. The two teams played each other in the 1974 ABA playoffs, a series the Nuggets won in six games.

The Nuggets and Nets had applied to join the NBA in 1975, but were forced to stay in the ABA by a court order. In 1976–77, the Nuggets officially moved to the NBA.

With the Stars, Salt Lake City had proven it could support big-time professional basketball. With this in mind, in 1976 the owners of the Spirits of St. Louis announced that they were moving the team to Utah for the 1976–1977 ABA season, to play as the Utah Rockies. However, this was undone when the ABA–NBA merger closed in June 1976 and the Spirits and the Kentucky Colonels were the only two teams left out of the merged league. (The Virginia Squires were folded shortly after the end of the regular season due to their inability to make good on a required league assessment, though there was no chance of them being part of a merger deal in any event.)

Professional basketball returned to Salt Lake City when the New Orleans Jazz of the National Basketball Association (NBA) relocated there in 1979.

=== 1984: First playoff meeting ===
By 1984, the Nuggets were eighth season in the NBA and the Jazz were in their fourth season in Utah. That season, the two franchises met in their first playoff match-up in the First Round of the Western Conference. With two of the best offenses in the league, the series was a high-scoring affair. The Jazz won Game 1 despite a furious Nuggets' comeback attempt in the fourth quarter in Utah. Game 2 saw Denver tie the series, with three 30-plus-point games from Dan Issel (33 pts), Kiki VanDeWeghe (32), and Alex English (31). Denver carried the momentum over and won a close Game 3. Utah's Adrian Dantley scored 39 points, as the Jazz saved off elimination with a 32 point fourth quarter to move the series back to Utah for the decisive Game 5. Utah won Game 5, 127-111, never trailing after a 41 point first quarter. Utah's Rickey Green played all but four minutes and hauled 16 rebounds and had 29 points. Dantley added 30 points and also had 12 rebounds.

Utah would lose in the next round to the Phoenix Suns, ending their first playoff season.

=== 1985: Second playoff meeting ===
In 1984-85, both franchises won their first round match-up. Utah upset the Houston Rockets in five games and Denver defeated the San Antonio Spurs in five games, as well. While their 1984 match-up was a back-and-forth affair, 1985 was a Nuggets rout, as they won the series, 4 games to 1. The highlight of the series was a Game 2 overtime when by Denver and a 40-point performance from Alex English in Game 5. On the plus side for Utah was the debut of future all-time NBA assist leader John Stockton, who the Jazz took 16th overall pick in the 1984 NBA Draft.

=== 1994: Third playoff meeting ===
In 1993-94, the Nuggets played around .500 in winning percentage all season long; the team got off to a 9–8 start to the regular season, before losing five straight games, but then posting a five-game winning streak afterwards in December, as they held a 22–25 record at the All-Star break. They won five of their final seven games of the season, and finished in fourth place in the Midwest Division with a 42–40 record, earning the eighth seed in the Western Conference, and qualifying for the NBA playoffs for the first time since the 1989–90 season. In the Western Conference First Round of the 1994 NBA playoffs, the Nuggets faced off against the top–seeded, and Pacific Division champion Seattle SuperSonics, who were led by the All-Star trio of Shawn Kemp, Gary Payton and Detlef Schrempf. The SuperSonics took a 2–0 series lead, but the Nuggets managed to win the next two games at home, including a Game 4 win at the McNichols Sports Arena in overtime, 94–85 to tie the series at 2–2. The Nuggets won Game 5 over the SuperSonics on the road in overtime, 98–94 at the Seattle Center Coliseum to win in a hard-fought five-game series, and became the first 8th-seeded team to beat a #1 seed; an on-court camera featured Mutombo, in jubilation on his back holding the ball after the buzzer.

The 1993-94 Jazz played competitive basketball with a 22–8 start to the regular season, but then lost five of their next six games, and held a 31–18 record at the All-Star break. At mid-season, the team traded Jeff Malone to the Philadelphia 76ers in exchange for All-Star guard Jeff Hornacek. With the addition of Hornacek, the Jazz posted a ten-game winning streak between February and March, and won nine of their final eleven games, finishing in third place in the Midwest Division with a 53–29 record, and earning the fifth seed in the Western Conference; the team made their eleventh consecutive trip to the NBA playoffs. Karl Malone averaged 25.2 points, 11.5 rebounds and 1.5 blocks per game, and joined the list in all-time points scored topping the 19,000 point mark, while John Stockton, a rookie in 1985, blossomed into an All-Star level point guard, averaging 15.1 points, 12.6 assists and 2.4 steals per game; both players were named to the All-NBA First Team. In the Western Conference First Round of the 1994 NBA playoffs, the Jazz faced off against the 4th–seeded San Antonio Spurs, who were led by the trio of All-Star center David Robinson, Dale Ellis, and rebound-specialist Dennis Rodman. The Jazz lost Game 1 on the road, 106–89 at the Alamodome, but managed to win the next three games over the Spurs, including a Game 4 home win at the Delta Center, 95–90 to win the series in four games.

In the Western Conference Semifinals, the Nuggets and Jazz for the first time since 1985. The Nuggets lost the first three games to the Jazz, but despite the threat of elimination, the team then managed to win the next three games, including a Game 6 win over the Jazz at home, 94–91 at the McNichols Sports Arena to even the series. However, the Nuggets lost Game 7 to the Jazz on the road, 91–81 at the Delta Center, thus losing in a hard-fought seven-game series. The Jazz would lose to the eventual champion Houston Rockets in the Western Conference Finals in five games the next round.

The Jazz would later go to the NBA Finals in 1997 and 1998, but lost to the Chicago Bulls each time.

=== 2020: Fourth playoff meeting ===
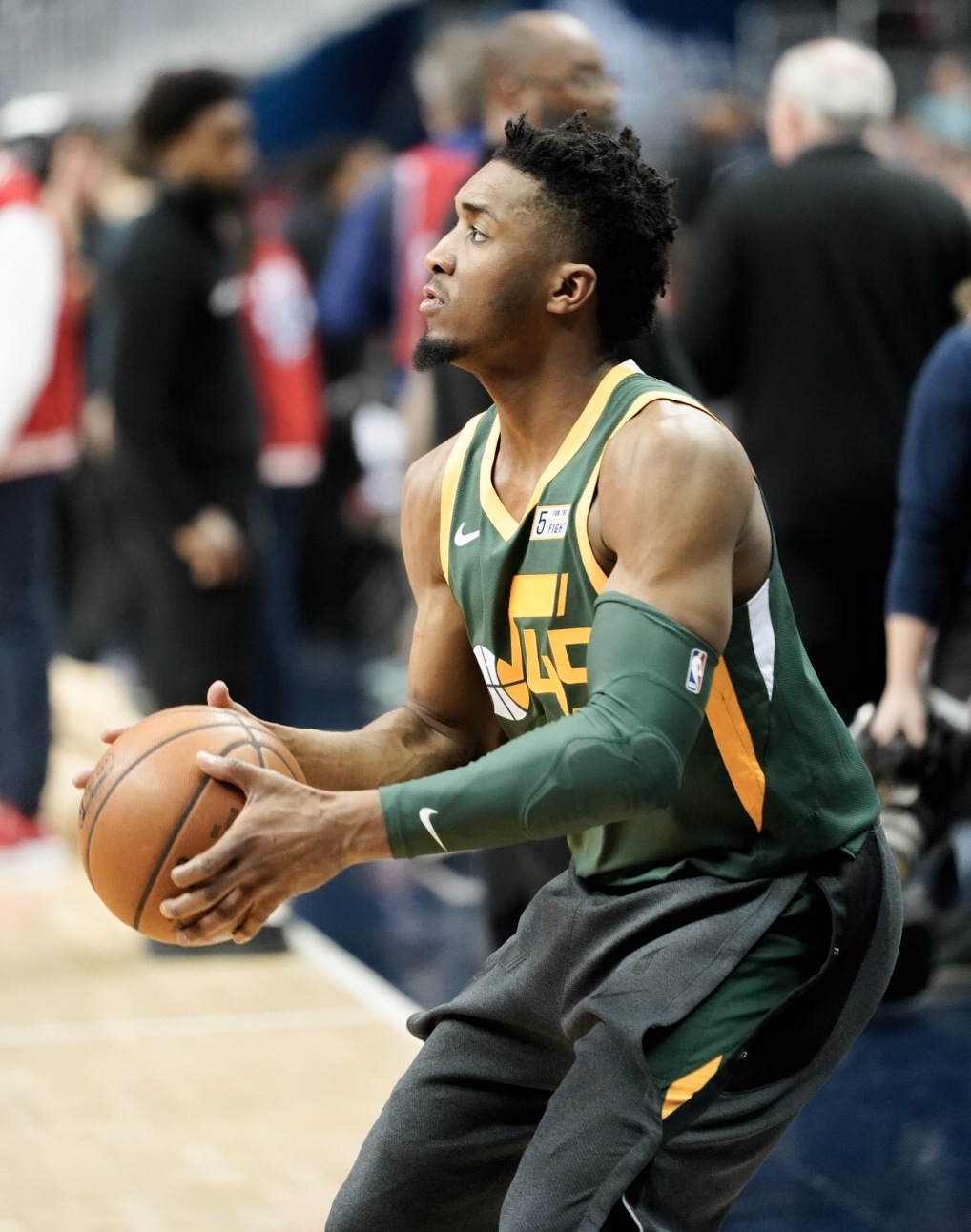
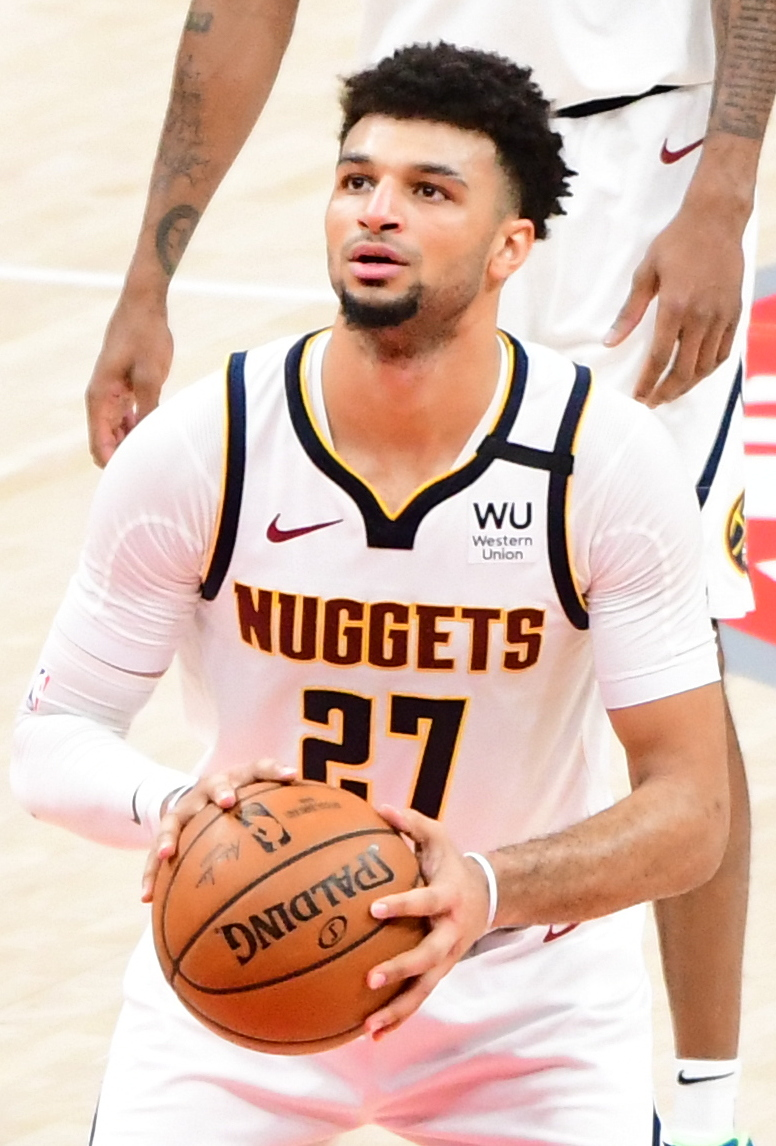
Donovan Mitchell (left) and Jamal Murray (right) each starred in the 2020 first round match-up between the Jazz and Nuggets.

Arguably the most memorable playoff meeting between the two franchises occurred in 2020, despite none of the games being played at each other's home venue. The season was suspended by the league officials following the games of March 11 after it was reported that Jazz center Rudy Gobert tested positive for COVID-19. When the league resumed, the Jazz and Nuggets were two of the 22 teams invited to the NBA Bubble on June 4. This meant every game would be played at a bio-secure bubble at Walt Disney World and the playoffs would start in August rather than the customary mid-April start.

Prior to the stop in play, both teams looked like NBA Final contenders. The Jazz, in their fourth year of playoff contention, were led by All-Star guard Donovan Mitchell and center Rudy Gobert, both of whom were originally drafted by the Nuggets before being immediately traded. Nikola Jokić and a breakout season from point guard Jamal Murray saw the Nuggets secure a playoff berth for their second consecutive season.

The Jazz raced off to a 3–1 lead; this included a Game 1 overtime when for the Nuggets. Had the Jazz won this game, they could have swept the series. In Game 4, Murray and Mitchell each had 50 and 51 points, respectively. This would be the first playoff game in NBA history in which two players scored 50 points. The Nuggets won Game 5 and Game 6, the latter which was another shootout between Murray (50 points) and Mitchell (44 points). Unlike the rest of the series, Game 7 was a defensive battle. Denver became the 12th team in NBA history to come back from a 3–1 deficit. Nikola Jokić scored the go-ahead hook shot with 27.8 seconds remaining in regulation. Mike Conley Jr.'s potential series-winning three-pointer at the buzzer rimmed out. In the next round, the Nuggets fell down 3–1, as well, before rallying to defeat the Los Angeles Clippers in seven. They lost to the Lakers in the Western Conference Finals. Three years later, the Nuggets won the NBA Finals, the first time either the Jazz or Nuggets won an NBA championship.

=== Season-by-season results ===
New Orleans/Utah Jazz vs. Denver Nuggets Season-by-Season Results
1970s (Nuggets, 12–6)

| Season | Season series | | at New Orleans/Utah Jazz | at Denver Nuggets | Overall series | Notes |
|---|---|---|---|---|---|---|
| 1976–77 | Nuggets | 3–1 | Tie, 1–1 | Nuggets, 2–0 | Nuggets; 3–1 | As a result of the ABA–NBA merger, the Jazz and Nuggets joined the same league. The Nuggets were placed in the Western Conference and the Midwest Division. Nuggets win the Midwest Division. |
| 1977–78 | Nuggets | 3–1 | Tie, 1–1 | Nuggets, 2–0 | Nuggets; 6–2 | Nuggets win the Midwest Division. |
| 1978–79 | Nuggets | 3–1 | Tie, 1–1 | Nuggets, 2–0 | Nuggets; 9–3 | Final season Jazz played as a New Orleans-based team. |
| 1979–80 | Tie | 3–3 | Jazz, 2–1 | Nuggets, 2–1 | Nuggets; 12–6 | Jazz relocate to Salt Lake City, Utah, open Salt Palace, and are moved to the Western Conference and the Midwest Division, becoming divisional rivals with the Nuggets. |

1980s (Jazz, 36–32)

| Season | Season series | | at Utah Jazz | at Denver Nuggets | Overall series | Notes |
|---|---|---|---|---|---|---|
| 1980–81 | Jazz | 4–2 | Jazz, 2–1 | Jazz, 2–1 | Nuggets; 14–10 | Jazz record their first season series win against the Nuggets and finish with a winning record in Denver for the first time. |
| 1981–82 | Tie | 3–3 | Jazz, 2–1 | Nuggets, 2–1 | Nuggets; 17–13 | On February 10, 1982, at Denver, Jazz beat the Nuggets 151–148, their most points scored in a game against the Nuggets. On March 16, 1982, at Denver, Nuggets beat the Jazz 154–138, their most points scored in a game against the Jazz. On April 10, 1982, at Utah, Jazz beat the Nuggets 151–136, tied for their most points scored in a game against the Nuggets. |
| 1982–83 | Nuggets | 4–2 | Jazz, 2–1 | Nuggets, 3–0 | Nuggets; 21–15 | |
| 1983–84 | Tie | 3–3 | Jazz, 3–0 | Nuggets, 3–0 | Nuggets; 24–18 | Jazz win their first Midwest Division. |
| 1984 Western Conference First Round | Jazz | 3–2 | Jazz, 2–1 | Tie, 1–1 | Nuggets; 26–21 | 1st postseason series. |
| 1984–85 | Nuggets | 4–2 | Jazz, 2–1 | Nuggets, 3–0 | Nuggets; 30–23 | Jazz draft John Stockton. Nuggets win the Midwest Division. |
| 1985 Western Conference Semifinals | Nuggets | 4–1 | Tie, 1–1 | Nuggets, 3–0 | Nuggets; 34–24 | 2nd postseason series. |
| 1985–86 | Tie | 3–3 | Jazz, 2–1 | Nuggets, 2–1 | Nuggets; 37–27 | Jazz draft Karl Malone. |
| 1986–87 | Jazz | 4–2 | Jazz, 3–0 | Nuggets, 2–1 | Nuggets; 39–31 | |
| 1987–88 | Jazz | 4–2 | Jazz, 2–1 | Jazz, 2–1 | Nuggets; 41–35 | Nuggets win the Midwest Division. |
| 1988–89 | Tie | 3–3 | Jazz, 3–0 | Nuggets, 3–0 | Nuggets; 44–38 | Jazz win the Midwest Division. |
| 1989–90 | Jazz | 4–0 | Jazz, 2–0 | Jazz, 2–0 | Nuggets; 44–42 | Jazz record their first season series sweep against the Nuggets. Last season Nuggets held the overall series record. |

1990s (Jazz, 36–15)

| Season | Season series | | at Utah Jazz | at Denver Nuggets | Overall series | Notes |
|---|---|---|---|---|---|---|
| 1990–91 | Jazz | 3–1 | Jazz, 2–0 | Tie, 1–1 | Tie; 45–45 | Last season Jazz played at Salt Palace. |
| 1991–92 | Jazz | 5–1 | Jazz, 3–0 | Jazz, 2–1 | Jazz; 50–46 | Jazz open Delta Center. Jazz win the Midwest Division. |
| 1992–93 | Jazz | 3–2 | Jazz, 2–1 | Tie, 1–1 | Jazz; 53–48 | |
| 1993–94 | Jazz | 4–1 | Jazz, 2–0 | Jazz, 2–1 | Jazz; 57–49 | |
| 1994 Western Conference Semifinals | Jazz | 4–3 | Jazz, 3–1 | Nuggets, 2–1 | Jazz; 61–52 | 3rd postseason series. Nuggets became the first team since the 1951 New York Knicks to force a Game 7 after being down 0–3. |
| 1994–95 | Jazz | 4–1 | Jazz, 3–0 | Tie, 1–1 | Jazz; 65–53 | On February 1, 1995, at Utah, Jazz beat the Nuggets 129–88, their largest victory against the Nuggets with a 41–point differential. |
| 1995–96 | Nuggets | 3–1 | Tie, 1–1 | Nuggets, 2–0 | Jazz; 66–56 | Nuggets win the season series against the Jazz for the first time since the 1985 Western Conference Semifinals and the 1984 season in the regular season. |
| 1996–97 | Jazz | 4–0 | Jazz, 2–0 | Jazz, 2–0 | Jazz; 70–56 | On November 27, 1996, at Utah, Jazz beat the Nuggets 107-103 after trailing 70-34 late in the second quarter, completing, as of 2026, the largest comeback in NBA history. Jazz win the Midwest Division. Jazz lose 1997 NBA Finals. |
| 1997–98 | Jazz | 4–0 | Jazz, 2–0 | Jazz, 2–0 | Jazz; 74–56 | Jazz win the Midwest Division. Jazz finish with the best record in the league (62–20). Jazz lose 1998 NBA Finals. |
| 1998–99 | Jazz | 2–1 | Jazz, 2–0 | Nuggets, 1–0 | Jazz; 76–57 | Last matchup at McNichols Sports Arena. |
| 1999–2000 | Tie | 2–2 | Jazz, 2–0 | Nuggets, 2–0 | Jazz; 78–59 | Nuggets open Pepsi Center (now known as Ball Arena). Jazz win the Midwest Division. |

2000s (Jazz, 25–15)

| Season | Season series | | at Utah Jazz | at Denver Nuggets | Overall series | Notes |
|---|---|---|---|---|---|---|
| 2000–01 | Jazz | 3–1 | Jazz, 2–0 | Tie, 1–1 | Jazz; 81–60 | |
| 2001–02 | Jazz | 3–1 | Jazz, 2–0 | Tie, 1–1 | Jazz; 84–61 | |
| 2002–03 | Jazz | 4–0 | Jazz, 2–0 | Jazz, 2–0 | Jazz; 88–61 | Jazz win 14 home games in a row against the Nuggets. Last season Karl Malone and John Stockton played for the Jazz. |
| 2003–04 | Nuggets | 3–1 | Tie, 1–1 | Nuggets, 2–0 | Jazz; 89–64 | |
| 2004–05 | Tie | 2–2 | Tie, 1–1 | Tie, 1–1 | Jazz; 91–66 | Jazz and Nuggets are moved to the Northwest Division. |
| 2005–06 | Jazz | 3–1 | Jazz, 2–0 | Tie, 1–1 | Jazz; 94–67 | On January 20, 2006, Nuggets beat the Jazz 113–83, their largest victory against the Jazz with a 30–point differential. Nuggets win their first Northwest Division. |
| 2006–07 | Jazz | 3–1 | Tie, 1–1 | Jazz, 2–0 | Jazz; 97–68 | Jazz win their first Northwest Division. |
| 2007–08 | Jazz | 3–1 | Jazz, 2–0 | Tie, 1–1 | Jazz; 100–69 | Jazz record their 100th win against the Nuggets. Jazz win the Northwest Division. |
| 2008–09 | Tie | 2–2 | Jazz, 2–0 | Nuggets, 2–0 | Jazz; 102–71 | Nuggets win the Northwest Division. |
| 2009–10 | Nuggets | 3–1 | Tie, 1–1 | Nuggets, 2–0 | Jazz; 103–74 | Nuggets win the Northwest Division. |

2010s (Jazz, 24–20)

| Season | Season series | | at Utah Jazz | at Denver Nuggets | Overall series | Notes |
|---|---|---|---|---|---|---|
| 2010 Western Conference First Round | Jazz | 4–2 | Jazz, 3–0 | Nuggets, 2–1 | Jazz; 107–76 | 4th postseason series. |
| 2010–11 | Tie | 2–2 | Tie, 1–1 | Tie, 1–1 | Jazz; 109–78 | |
| 2011–12 | Jazz | 2–1 | Jazz, 1–0 | Tie, 1–1 | Jazz; 111–79 | |
| 2012–13 | Nuggets | 3–1 | Tie, 1–1 | Nuggets, 2–0 | Jazz; 112–82 | |
| 2013–14 | Tie | 2–2 | Tie, 1–1 | Tie, 1–1 | Jazz; 114–84 | |
| 2014–15 | Tie | 2–2 | Tie, 1–1 | Tie, 1–1 | Jazz; 116–86 | |
| 2015–16 | Jazz | 4–0 | Jazz, 2–0 | Jazz, 2–0 | Jazz; 120–86 | Nikola Jokić makes his debut for the Nuggets. Jazz's first season series sweep against the Nuggets since the 2002 season. |
| 2016–17 | Tie | 2–2 | Jazz, 2–0 | Nuggets, 2–0 | Jazz; 122–88 | Jazz win the Northwest Division. |
| 2017–18 | Tie | 2–2 | Jazz, 2–0 | Nuggets, 2–0 | Jazz; 124–90 | |
| 2018–19 | Jazz | 3–1 | Jazz, 2–0 | Tie, 1–1 | Jazz; 127–91 | Nuggets win the Northwest Division. |
| 2019–20 | Nuggets | 3–0 | Nuggets, 1–0 | Nuggets, 2–0 | Jazz; 127–94 | Due to the COVID-19 pandemic suspending the season, their remaining game at Utah was canceled, while their remaining game at Denver was played in the 2020 NBA Bubble. Nuggets record their first season series sweep against the Jazz and finish with a winning record in Utah for the first time. Nuggets win the Northwest Division. |

2020s (Nuggets, 18–12)

| Season | Season series | | at Utah Jazz | at Denver Nuggets | Overall series | Notes |
|---|---|---|---|---|---|---|
| 2020 Western Conference First Round | Nuggets | 4–3 | Jazz, 2–1 | Nuggets, 3–1 | Jazz; 130–98 | 5th postseason series. Games were played at the 2020 NBA Bubble. Nuggets became the 12th team in NBA history to overcome a 3–1 deficit. |
| 2020–21 | Jazz | 2–1 | Jazz, 1–0 | Tie, 1–1 | Jazz; 132–99 | Jazz win the Northwest Division. Jazz finish with the best record in the league (52–20). |
| 2021–22 | Jazz | 4–0 | Jazz, 2–0 | Jazz, 2–0 | Jazz; 136–99 | Jazz win the Northwest Division. |
| 2022–23 | Tie | 2–2 | Jazz, 2–0 | Nuggets, 2–0 | Jazz; 138–101 | Nuggets record their 100th win against the Jazz. Nuggets win the Northwest Division. Nuggets win 2023 NBA Finals. |
| 2023–24 | Nuggets | 3–1 | Tie, 1–1 | Nuggets, 2–0 | Jazz; 139–104 | |
| 2024–25 | Nuggets | 4–0 | Nuggets, 2–0 | Nuggets, 2–0 | Jazz; 139–108 | |
| 2025–26 | Nuggets | 4–0 | Nuggets, 2–0 | Nuggets, 2–0 | Jazz; 139–112 | |
| 2026–27 | Tie | 0-0 | November 27th and December 12th, 2026 | January 19th and February 17th, 2027 | Jazz; 139–112 | |

Summary of Results

| Season | Season series | | at New Orleans/Utah Jazz | at Denver Nuggets | Notes |
|---|---|---|---|---|---|
| Regular season games | Jazz | 124–97 | Jazz, 84–26 | Nuggets, 71–40 | |
| Postseason games | Tie | 15–15 | Jazz, 11–4 | Nuggets, 11–4 | |
| Postseason series | Jazz | 3–2 | Jazz, 2–0 | Nuggets, 2–1 | Western Conference First Round: 1984, 2010, 2020; Western Conference Semifinals: 1985, 1994 |
| Regular and postseason | Jazz | 139–112 | Jazz, 95–30 | Nuggets, 82–44 | Both teams are tied 3–3 record in New Orleans. Jazz currently have a 92–27 record in Salt Lake City, Utah. |

== See also ==
- Rocky Mountain Cup (Colorado Rapids–Real Salt Lake rivalry)
- Rumble in the Rockies (Colorado Buffaloes–Utah Utes rivalry)
