= Lightning–Panthers rivalry =

National Hockey League rivalry

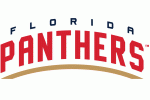
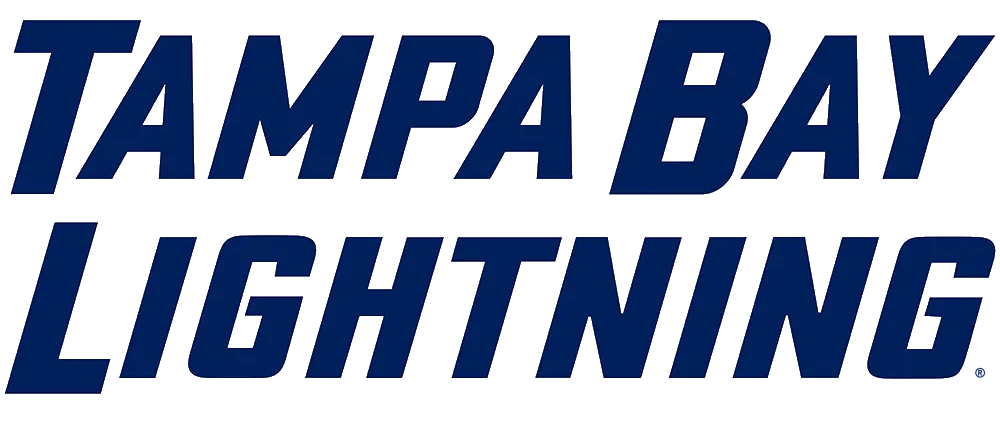
- Florida Panthers Tampa Bay Lightning
- First meeting: October 9, 1993
- Latest meeting: February 5, 2026
- Next meeting: November 28, 2026

Statistics
- Total meetings: 185
- All-time series: 90–66–10–19 (FLA)
- Regular season series: 80–56–10–19 (FLA)
- Postseason results: 10–10 (tied)
- Largest victory: FLA 9–2 TBL; February 17, 2024
- Longest win streak: FLA W9
- Current win streak: TBL W2

Postseason history
- 2021 first round: Lightning won, 4–2; 2022 second round: Lightning won, 4–0; 2024 first round: Panthers won, 4–1; 2025 first round: Panthers won, 4–1

The Lightning–Panthers rivalry, also known as the Battle of Florida or the Battle of the Sunshine State, is a National Hockey League (NHL) rivalry between the Tampa Bay Lightning and the Florida Panthers. Both the Lightning and the Panthers compete in the NHL's Atlantic Division (and both were temporarily placed in the Central Division for the 2020–21 season). In past seasons, the rivalry has been recognized in a trophy known as the Governor's Cup, also called the Sunshine Cup and later the Nextel Cup Challenge.

== Origins ==
Both the Lightning and the Panthers were born out of the National Hockey League's expansion into the southeast in the early 1990s. Aside from a few abortive attempts to bring minor league hockey to Florida (the Tropical Hockey League of the 1930s, and Jacksonville Rockets and Barons of the 1960s/70s); these were the first professional hockey franchises in the Sunshine State. Tampa Bay began play in the 1992–93 season, with Florida joining the league a year later for the 1993–94 season. (Note: Though Tampa Bay joined the league a year before Florida, both teams entered the Eastern Conference in 1993. The Lightning spent their first season in the Norris Division of the Western Conference (then known as the "Clarence S. Campbell Conference").)

The new Panthers team immediately drew ire from Lightning fans, who objected to the Miami-based franchise claiming the geographical designation of Florida. They also held scorn for Panthers owner Wayne Huizenga, who, as owner of the Florida Marlins baseball team, was regarded as sabotaging Tampa Bay's efforts to land an expansion team. To make matters worse, the "Florida Panthers" name had originally been used for a failed Tampa-based expansion bid, before Huizenga bought the rights and used it for his NHL team.

Lightning founder and general manager Phil Esposito saw the Panthers as an opportunity to drive ticket sales. "It's going to be great for us bringing a team to Miami because now we're getting somebody our fans can really hate," he said. Esposito, along with Tampa Bay coach Terry Crisp, began to make disparaging remarks about the Panthers organization, referring to them as "pussycats." All of this upset Florida general manager Bobby Clarke, who in his playing days was a former teammate of Crisp's (and rival of Esposito's). Clarke retorted that Esposito should not call anyone a "pussycat," considering "the way he used to play." Shortly afterwards, Esposito jokingly gave Clarke a kiss on the cheek on a live television interview, incensing the Florida GM. Though Crisp later played the episode off as merely part of the entertainment aspect of the sport, Esposito would continue to refer to "the stinking Panthers" for years to come.

== History ==
=== First meetings (1993–2002) ===
In the first of four preseason meetings at the Lakeland Civic Center, 3,876 fans watched Tampa Bay defeat Florida, 4–3 on September 16, 1993. The teams' first regular season meeting came on October 9, 1993. That proved to be historic as 27,227 onlookers witnessed the Panthers earn their first ever win, 2–0, at the cavernous ThunderDome. That attendance mark remains the NHL record for a regular season game not played as part of the NHL Stadium Series, NHL Winter Classic or NHL Heritage Classic. Initially, the Lightning refused to recognize the Panther's geographical designation, billing the series as one against the "Miami Panthers" on tickets and scoreboards.

Though they were both expansion teams, the Panthers enjoyed success far earlier than the Lightning did. In 1993–94, their first season, the Panthers finished two points below .500, just missing out on a final 1994 playoff spot. They were a point out of playoff contention at the end of the lockout-shortened 1994–95 season, finally making it in 1996. That year, the Panthers made a run all the way to the Stanley Cup Final. Although the Lightning also earned their first-ever postseason spot in 1996, they were dispatched in the first round. Tampa Bay's success was clouded by an inattentive, scandal-ridden ownership group that led to the team being investigated by the Internal Revenue Service. In 2001–02, Tampa Bay became the first team in NHL history to post four straight 50-loss seasons.

During his tenure as Panthers head coach, Roger Neilson downplayed the importance of the rivalry while using crude language to refer to Lightning fans. "Not being a Floridian, I can't be sure of this, but I think the 'Tampons' [sic], or whatever you call them, that they dislike Miami a lot more than Miami dislikes them. They get very upset with Miami. I'm talking about Tampa itself as a city, and I think it's the same with the team."

=== Mixed success and cooled rivalry (2002–2019) ===
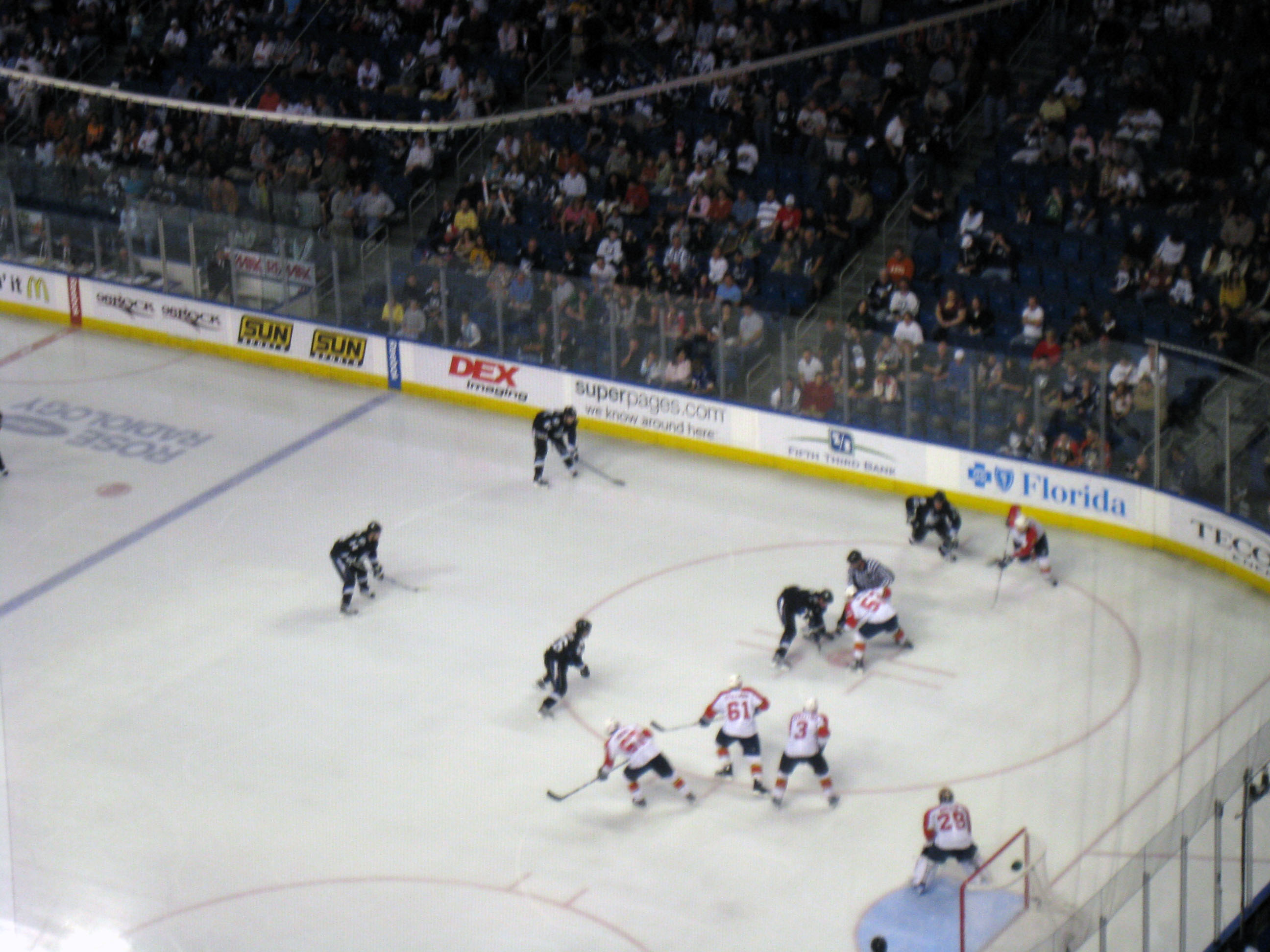
The Panthers and Lightning playing at the St. Pete Times Forum in 2008

The two teams saw reversed fortunes in the early 2000s. Under a new ownership group, the Lightning acquired a core of young talent, including future Hall of Famer Martin St. Louis. By the 2002–03 season, they won the division and their first round playoff series. In 2003–04, the Lightning again won the division, but this time with the second best record in the NHL. In the 2004 playoffs they navigated their way to their first Stanley Cup title. Meanwhile, the Panthers languished near the bottom of the division; after 2001, they would go 11 years without a playoff berth.

Florida's lack of postseason success carried throughout the 2010s, with only two first round appearances in the decade. On the other side of the state, the Lightning became a perennial playoff team. Beginning in 2011 Tampa Bay took playoff berths in six of nine seasons including their second trip to the Stanley Cup Final in 2015.

Although they had been in the same division every season for more than two decades, and faced one another more than any other opponent, players and coaches alike acknowledged that a true ice hockey rivalry – in the spirit of classics like the Blackhawks–Red Wings or even contemporaries like the Kings–Sharks – failed to materialize. At the very least, the rivalry went dormant from a lack of playoff meetings, compounded by Tampa Bay's dominance and Florida's irrelevance in the latter half of the 2010s.

=== Combined playoff success and division contention (2019–present) ===
Since 2020, not only have both teams made the playoffs every year, but one or the other club has also reached the Stanley Cup Final. The Panthers finally returned to the playoffs in the 2020, but lost in the qualifying round, while the Lightning would go on to win their second Stanley Cup in team history, a year after being swept.

In the 2020–21 season, the rivalry became even more intense. With both teams set to meet in the first round in the 2021 Stanley Cup playoffs, they met head-to-head in the last two regular season games on May 8 and 10, that decided home-ice advantage in that matchup. The Panthers won both games to finish the season in second place with home-ice advantage, one spot ahead of the Lightning. Despite this, Tampa Bay won the first-ever playoff game between them, 5–4, as well as the first-ever playoff series by a count of four games to two. The Lightning would go on to win their second consecutive Stanley Cup and third overall.

Going into the 2021–22 season, Florida captain Aleksander Barkov said of the Lightning: "We know them really well. We hate each other and you can see it in our games. They bring out the best of us and we do the same with them. We want to be better than they are." The Panthers dominated the Atlantic Division, finishing first in the NHL standings to win their first ever Presidents' Trophy. In their last regular season meeting on April 24, the Lightning snapped a Panthers' franchise-record 13-game win streak. That same game saw the two teams combine for 90 penalty minutes, with four Panthers, including head coach Andrew Brunette, ejected.

The two teams met again in the second round of the 2022 Stanley Cup playoffs. Tampa Bay once again got the better of their in-state rivals, defeating them in four straight games. The Lightning then had a third consecutive Final appearance. Florida only managed to score three goals past Tampa Bay's goaltender Andrei Vasilevskiy.

In July 2022, Matthew Tkachuk, upon being traded to Florida from the Calgary Flames, compared the Battle of Florida to the Battle of Alberta: "I hate Edmonton, but I hate Tampa more now." He added that the Panthers would not be discouraged by their swift playoff exit at the hands of their intrastate rivals: "They're the team to beat. It seems like for us we're going to have to go through them at some point, so I'm excited for that challenge. They know what it takes to win, and we're going to learn that." The Lightning lost their first round series, while Tkachuk led the Panthers all the way to the 2023 Stanley Cup Final.

The two teams met in the first round of the 2024 playoffs, with the Panthers winning the series in five games on the way to winning their first Stanley Cup in franchise history. In doing so, Carter Verhaeghe became the first player to win a Stanley Cup with both teams. Both teams played each other for the second straight season in the first round of the 2025 playoffs, with the Panthers again winning the series in five games on the way to repeating as Stanley Cup champions.

== Trophy ==
That first regular season game also saw the introduction of a 15-pound trophy for the winner of the season series, the Sunshine Cup. Presented by the Sunshine Network (the cable broadcast partner for both clubs), it was the first—and to date, only—NHL trophy to be contested by two specific teams, a phenomenon more associated with regional college football rivalries. For the 2003–04 season, it was reintroduced as the Nextel Cup Challenge by the two clubs' marketing departments, though that iteration also lasted only one season. Both cups were intended to raise money for the teams' charitable foundations.

In 2014, Florida Governor Rick Scott announced a second revival of the series winner trophy, now called the Governor's Cup. Specifically the cup's creation was described as an aim to increase the popularity of ice hockey within the state of Florida, as well as supporting youth hockey. The first Governor's Cup was won by the Lightning; however, the trophy has not been awarded since 2014.

== See also ==
- List of NHL rivalries
- Buccaneers–Dolphins rivalry
- Heat–Magic rivalry
- Fort Lauderdale–Tampa Bay rivalry
- Inter Miami CF–Orlando City SC rivalry
