= Buccaneers–Dolphins rivalry =

National Football League cross-state rivalry in Florida

- Tampa Bay Buccaneers Miami Dolphins
- Location: Tampa, Miami
- First meeting: October 24, 1976; Dolphins 23, Buccaneers 20
- Latest meeting: December 28, 2025; Dolphins 20, Buccaneers 17
- Next meeting: TBD (No later than the 2029 regular season)
- Stadiums: Buccaneers: Raymond James Stadium; Dolphins: Hard Rock Stadium

Statistics
- Total meetings: 13
- All-time series: Buccaneers: 7–6
- Largest victory: Buccaneers: 45–17 (2021); Dolphins: 33–14 (1991)
- Most points scored: Buccaneers: 45 (2021); Dolphins: 41 (1985)
- Longest win streak: Buccaneers: 3 (1997–2005, 2013–2021); Dolphins: 3 (1985–1991)
- Current win streak: Dolphins: 1 (2025–present)

The Buccaneers–Dolphins rivalry is a National Football League (NFL) rivalry between the Tampa Bay Buccaneers and Miami Dolphins.

It is an in-state, interconference matchup between the two oldest NFL teams in the state of Florida. It has been active in most years since the Buccaneers joined the league as an expansion team in 1976. The rivalry is mostly a mainstay of the preseason, as the teams have been in different conferences since 1977; the Dolphins are part of the AFC East, while the Buccaneers are part of the NFC South. According to the current NFL scheduling format, the two teams play each other once every four years during the regular season and once every eight seasons at each team's home stadium. However, ever since the implementation of the NFL's new 17-game schedule in 2021, it is now possible for the two teams to meet as often as every other year depending on the division standings of both teams. In addition, the two clubs play each other during the preseason nearly every year, with the site rotating on a mostly regular basis. The two teams have never met in the playoffs. Currently, the only circumstance in which the two teams could meet during the postseason would be in the Super Bowl.

Though the in-state rivalry has no official nickname, it has sometimes been referred to as the "Sunshine Series."

The Buccaneers lead the overall series, 7–6.

== History ==
=== 1970s ===
Tampa Bay joined the NFL as an expansion team in 1976, and immediately team officials were anxious to establish an in-state rivalry with the Miami Dolphins. The two-time Super Bowl winning Dolphins were the more popular and established team of the state, however, fans in the Tampa/St. Pete area were enthusiastic about finally having their own team to cheer for. In Tampa Bay's expansion season, they hosted the Dolphins at Tampa Stadium for a preseason game, in front of a record crowd of 67,466. The Dolphins won 28–21. The two teams met again during the regular season two months later, also in Tampa. The Dolphins again prevailed by a score of 23–20, on a 29-yard field goal by Garo Yepremian with 55 seconds left in regulation.

Though they would play only once every three years during the regular season (due to being in different conferences starting in 1977), the two teams agreed to continue an annual preseason matchup. The two teams played each other for four years (1976–1979). Though the game was considered a "meaningless" exhibition game, the young Bucs team were noted for aggressive play, and for "taking the game seriously." With the Buccaneers known at the time for being a poor team ("0–26") of rag-tag rookies, unwanted veterans, and various free agents, the squad often wanted to showcase themselves in the game and show the league they had ability. The intense play hit a climax in 1978, which saw Dolphins starting quarterback Bob Griese go down with a knee injury. He would be sidelined until October, and the incident drew the ire of Dolphins owner Joe Robbie, who decided to put a stop to the preseason series between the two teams.

Of the five meetings in the 1970s (four of which were preseason), Miami won all five games.

=== 1980s ===
With an ongoing squabble between the respective owners Joe Robbie and Hugh Culverhouse, the teams only met twice in the entire decade of the 1980s during the preseason. Their first matchup of the decade was a regular season meeting during the 1982 strike-shortened season, on Monday Night Football. Miami entered the game 3–0, while the Buccaneers were 0–3. The Bucs jumped out to a 16–3 lead, and intercepted Miami five times, en route to a 23–17 victory. It was Tampa Bay's first ever win over Miami. The result reflected upon the perceived "Tampa Bay Curse", as Miami would go to lose Super Bowl XVII.

In the 1981 season, the respective coaching staffs of Miami and Tampa Bay faced each other in the Pro Bowl at Aloha Stadium. The AFC, led by Miami's head coach Don Shula defeated John McKay's NFC squad by the score of 16–13.

The highest scoring regular season game between the two teams came in 1985. Miami's Dan Marino passed for 302 yards and three touchdown, while Steve DeBerg threw four touchdowns to Jimmie Giles. Miami won 41–38 on a field goal by Fuad Reveiz with six seconds left. That game also marked the second game as a Dolphin for linebacker Hugh Green, who had been traded from the Buccaneers earlier that season.

With the Buccaneers mostly uncompetitive during the 1980s, and the infrequent meetings between the two clubs, the rivalry de-intensified during the decade.

=== 1990s ===
Starting in 1991, the two teams revived their preseason rivalry on a permanent basis. With Wayne Huizenga assuming control of the Dolphins, and Malcolm Glazer later purchasing the Buccaneers, both teams had new ownership and new direction. The two franchises wholeheartedly agreed upon an annual preseason series. The close proximity between the clubs made the decision one of convenience for both the players and fans. Along with the expansion Jacksonville Jaguars, who started play in 1995, the three Florida teams started a fairly regular three-way intrastate preseason rivalry series.

Miami and Tampa Bay did not play during the preseason in 1993 or 1999. The 1995 game was played at a neutral site, the Florida Citrus Bowl in Orlando, with the Bucs serving as the home team.

The two teams played twice during the preseason in 1996. On August 3, 1996, Jimmy Johnson made his debut on the sidelines as coach of the Dolphins, while Tony Dungy coached his first game for Tampa Bay. The Dolphins won the first meeting at Joe Robbie Stadium by a score of 13–10. Three weeks later, the Dolphins swept the two-game series with a 19–7 victory.

In 1997, the two teams played each other for the final time in aging Houlihan's Stadium. The home team Buccaneers prevailed with a score of 24–10 in the preseason, and 31-21 a month later in the regular season.

=== 2000–2002 ===
Tampa Bay and Miami have played nearly every preseason in the 21st century, even during years in which they have been scheduled to play during the regular season.

In 2000, the two teams faced each other in a regular season matchup in mid-December. In a driving rain, with sloppy conditions, Buccaneers kicker Martin Gramatica kicked a 46-yard go-ahead field goal which proved to be the winning margin.

On Monday night, August 13, 2001, the two teams played each other for the first time at Raymond James Stadium, in a preseason opener. Dolphins quarterback Mike Quinn threw a 46-yard "Hail Mary" to Robert Baker as time expired to win by a score of 17–13.

During the preseason opener on Monday night August 12, 2002, the two teams met again at Raymond James Stadium. It served as Jon Gruden's first coached game for the Buccaneers. Frank Murphy took the opening kickoff 95 yards for a touchdown. It was the Buccaneers' fifth kickoff return touchdown in a preseason game, however, at the time, the team had still never returned a kickoff for a touchdown in the regular season (and would do so not until 2007). Tampa Bay would go on to win 14–10.

=== 2005 ===
In 2005, the two teams met in a regular season matchup, a game that drew some controversy in the secondary market of Orlando, Florida. The Buccaneers entered the game in first place with a record of 4–1. The Dolphins were 2–2, and were lauding the anticipated return of Ricky Williams after a year of retirement and a four-game suspension. Due to the complex rules of the NFL television contracts, the Orlando area, well known for having large Dolphins and Buccaneers fanbases, but designated a Jaguars secondary market, was required to instead air a Jacksonville away game during the timeslot. CBS affiliate WKMG lobbied the NFL to reverse the decision and allow the Bucs–Dolphins game to air in Orlando. After several weeks of passionate pleading, the request was denied. Station general manager Henry Maldonado recorded a message for fans that aired just before the broadcast, apologizing for his inability to remedy the situation. In the game, the Buccaneers rolled 27–13, and Williams was not a factor.

=== 2013 ===
They met on Monday Night Football in 2013. Going into the game, considerable media attention focused on the Richie Incognito/Jonathan Martin bullying scandal. In addition, Buccaneers head coach Greg Schiano was considered on the "hot seat" due to a poor 0–8 record. Tampa Bay jumped out to a 15–0 lead, and held on for a 22–19 victory, their first win of the 2013 season. The Buccaneers defense held Miami to only 2 yards rushing, an all-time record low for the Tampa Bay defense, as well as a franchise record low in terms of productivity for the Dolphins' offense.

=== 2016–2021 ===
The annual preseason meeting was not held in 2016, the first time that had happened since 1999. Both clubs were in the middle of offseason stadium renovations. Tampa Bay played their first two preseason games on the road, and Miami also played their first two preseason games on the road (and the third at a neutral site), preventing the two clubs from logistically being able to meet for a matchup.

In 2017, further stadium renovations in Tampa again precluded a preseason meeting between the two clubs. Both teams were scheduled to meet on opening day in Miami anyway, rendering the preseason match less of a priority. However, due to the approaching Hurricane Irma, the game was moved to November 19, the date in which both clubs were originally scheduled for their bye week. Tampa Bay kicked a go-ahead field goal with 4 seconds remaining in regulation to take a 23–20 lead. It appeared briefly it would be the seventh meeting decided by a field goal or less. On the ensuing kickoff, Miami players attempted to lateral the ball, but fumbled it back into their own end zone where it was recovered by Tampa Bay for an improbable touchdown as time expired, and a 10-point victory.

In 2018–2019, the annual preseason meeting was reprised. However, they were not scheduled to meet in the preseason in 2020, and the 2020 preseason was subsequently cancelled outright due to COVID-19.

The most recent regular season meeting occurred on October 10, 2021, featuring former New England Patriots quarterback Tom Brady meeting his former division rivals, the Dolphins. (Note: For more information, see Dolphins–Patriots rivalry.) The Buccaneers won this game 45–17.

== Game results ==
Season	Date	Home team	Site	Result	Overall series	Notes
1976	October 24	Tampa Bay	Tampa Stadium	Dolphins 23–20	Dolphins 1–0	
1982	November 29	Tampa Bay	Tampa Stadium	Buccaneers 23–17	Tied 1–1	Dolphins lose Super Bowl XVII.
1985	October 20	Miami	Orange Bowl	Dolphins 41–38	Dolphins 2–1	
1988	October 30	Tampa Bay	Tampa Stadium	Dolphins 17–14	Dolphins 3–1	
1991	December 1	Miami	Joe Robbie Stadium	Dolphins 33–14	Dolphins 4–1	
1997	September 21	Tampa Bay	Houlihan's Stadium	Buccaneers 31–21	Dolphins 4–2	
2000	December 10	Miami	Pro Player Stadium	Buccaneers 16–13	Dolphins 4–3	
2005	October 16	Tampa Bay	Raymond James Stadium	Buccaneers 27–13	Tied 4–4	
2009	November 15	Miami	Land Shark Stadium	Dolphins 25–23	Dolphins 5–4	
2013	November 11	Tampa Bay	Raymond James Stadium	Buccaneers 22–19	Tied 5–5	Tampa Bay get their first win of the season after an 0–8 start.
2017	November 19	Miami	Hard Rock Stadium	Buccaneers 30–20	Buccaneers 6–5	
2021	October 10	Tampa Bay	Raymond James Stadium	Buccaneers 45–17	Buccaneers 7–5	
2025	December 28	Miami	Hard Rock Stadium	Dolphins 20–17	Buccaneers 7–6	

== Connections between the teams ==
=== Coaches/executives ===
Name	Buccaneers' tenure	Dolphins' tenure
Jim Bates	2009, Defensive coordinator	2000–2004, Defensive coordinator 2004, Interim head coach
Todd Bowles	2019–2021, Defensive coordinator 2022–present, Head coach	2008–2011, Assistant head coach/secondary coach 2011, Interim head coach
Jim Caldwell	2001, Quarterbacks coach	2019, Assistant head coach/quarterbacks coach
Dennis Hickey	1996–1997, Pro personnel assistant 1998–2003, college scout 2004–2010, Director of college scouting 2011–2013, Director of player personnel	2014–2015, General manager
Jason Licht	2014–present, General manager	1995, Scouting assistant 1996, Offensive quality control coordinator
Marc Trestman	1987, Quarterbacks coach	2004, Assistant head coach
Dave Wannstedt	2013, Special teams coach	1999, Associate head coach 2000–2004, Head coach

=== Players ===
Name	Position(s)	Buccaneers' tenure	Dolphins' tenure
Shaquil Barrett	Linebacker	2019–2023, 2024	2024*
K.J. Britt	Linebacker	2021–2024	2025
Quinton Bell	Linebacker	2019–2020	2023–2025
Chase Edmonds	Running back	2023–2024	2022
Jay Fiedler	Quarterback	2006*	2000–2004
Brian Griese	Quarterback	2004–2005, 2008	2003
Brent Grimes	Cornerback	2016-2018	2013-2015
Ryan Fitzpatrick	Quarterback	2017–2018	2019–2020
Jason Garrett	Quarterback	2004	2004
Ted Larsen	Guard	2010–2013, 2020	2017–2018
Josh McCown	Quarterback	2014	2008*
Josh Rosen	Quarterback	2020*	2019
Ndamukong Suh	Defensive tackle	2019–2021	2015–2017
Anthony Walker Jr.	Linebacker	2025	2024

*Offseason and/or practice squad member only

== See also ==
- List of NFL rivalries
- Lightning–Panthers rivalry
- Fort Lauderdale–Tampa Bay rivalry
