= Sports commentator =

Broadcaster who comments on a live event

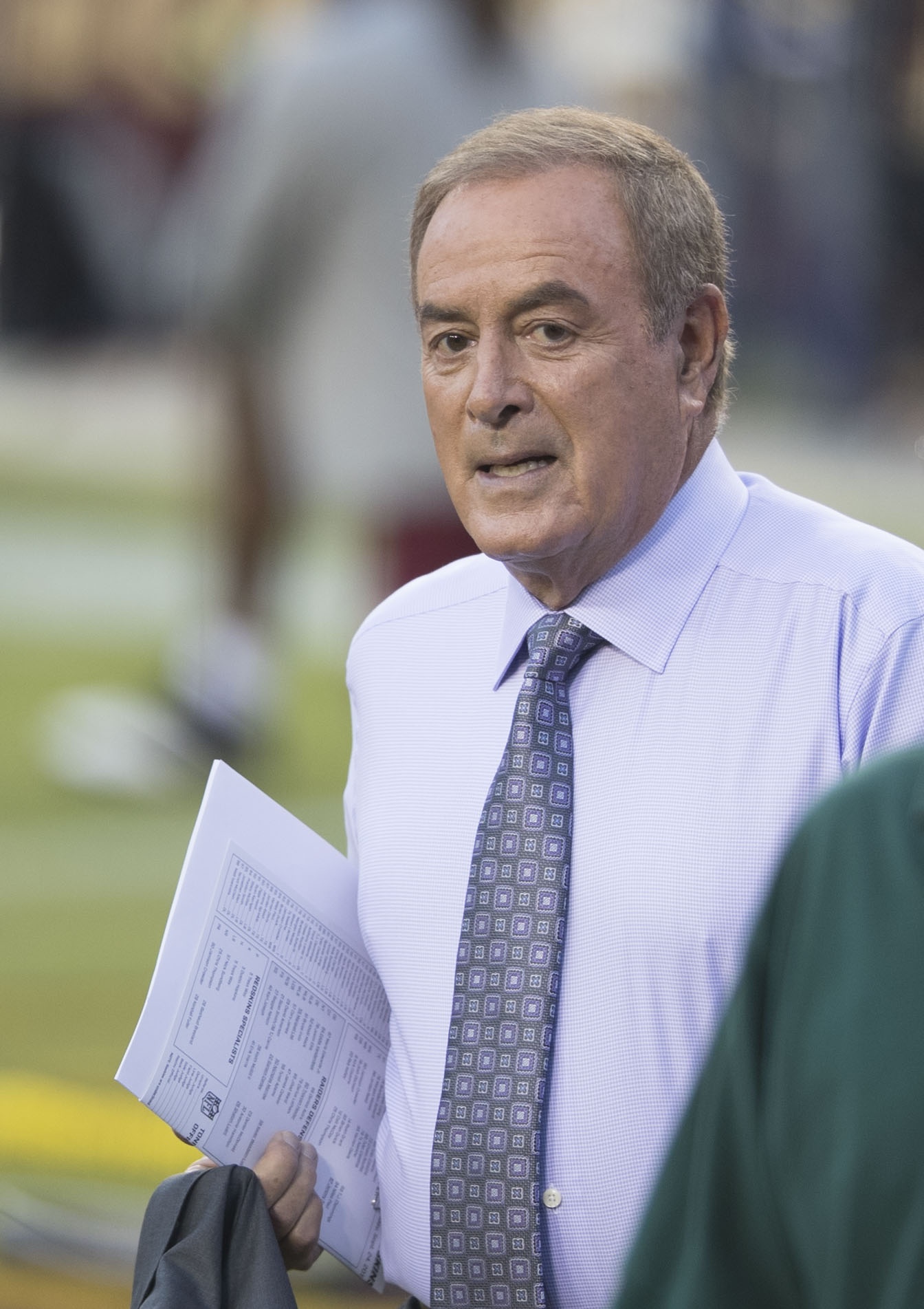
One of American television's most respected journalists, Al Michaels has covered more major sports events than any other American sportscaster, including 20 years as the play-by-play voice of Monday Night Football. He is the only commentator to call the Super Bowl, World Series, NBA Finals and host the Stanley Cup Final for network television.

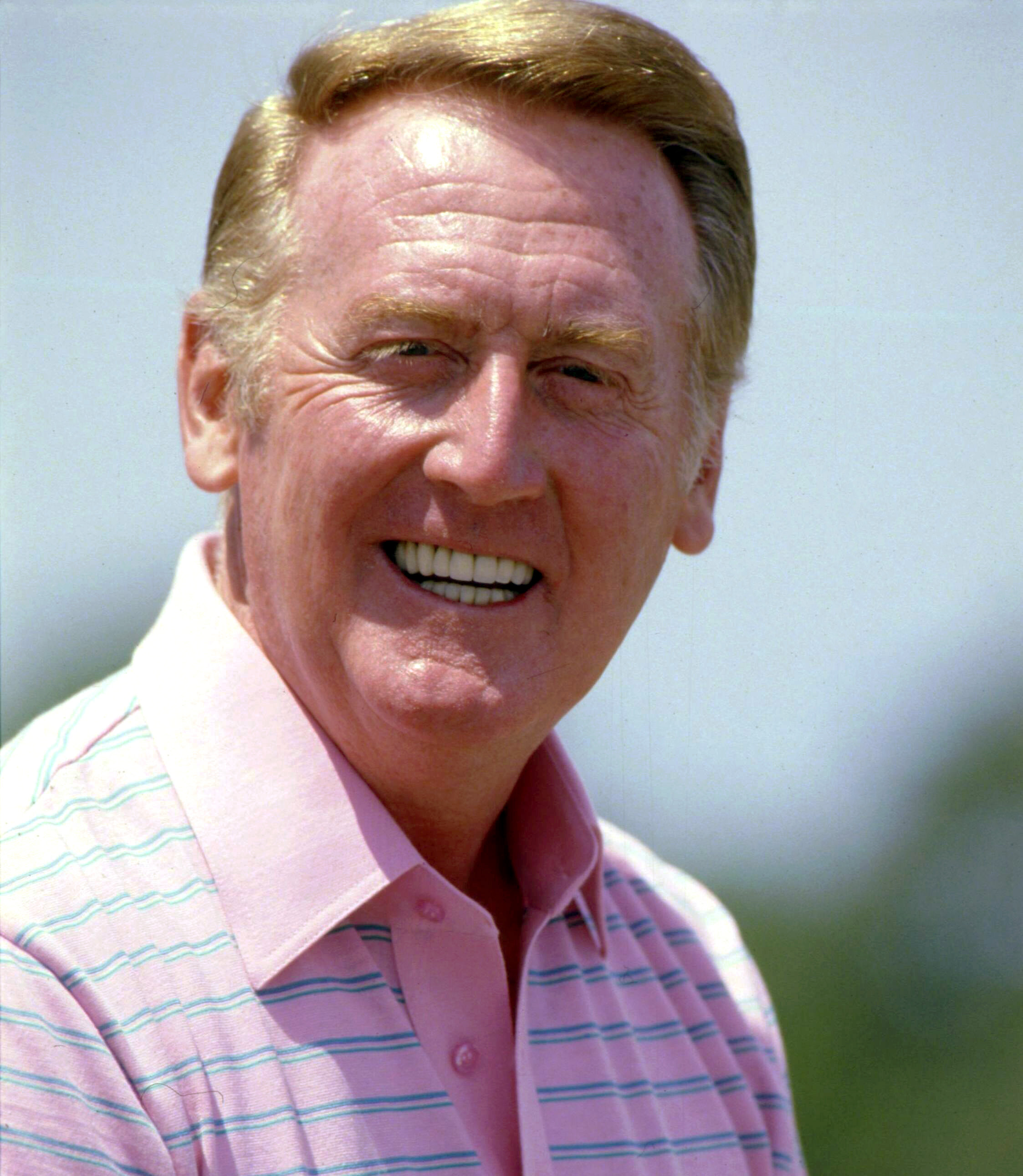
American commentator Vin Scully is widely considered to be one of the greatest broadcasters in baseball history.

In sports broadcasting, a sports commentator (also known as a sports announcer or sportscaster) provides live commentary on a game or event, usually on radio or television. Radio broadcasting requires the commentator to describe the action in more detail than television does and provide an ongoing account of the progress of play. In television broadcasts, commentators generally speak over images of the event, while sounds from the action and spectators are heard in the background. Television commentators rarely appear on screen during an event, although some broadcasters show them before or after the contest or briefly during breaks.

The development of radio in the early 20th century significantly changed how the public consumed sports media by enabling listeners to hear commentary in real time. The history of sports commentating dates back to April 11, 1921 in the United States of America, when the first live radio commentary of a sporting event was made by local newspaper sports editor Florent Gibson of the Pittsburgh Daily Post, for the radio station KDKA in Pittsburgh. This radio coverage of a boxing match between Johnny Ray and Johnny Dundee was the beginning of a new era for sports broadcasting.

On February 4, 1937, the first live television commentary of a sporting event was made by Harry Malin at Alexandra Palace, London, for the BBC. This commentary was for another boxing match, which was held in the BBC Concert Hall due to the difficulties of outside broadcast. Malin was a former middleweight champion and Olympic gold medalist. The match was between W.S. Pack and T. Byrne. On May 17, 1939, the first live televised sports broadcast of a baseball game was transmitted to the public in the United States. This was a college game between Columbia and Princeton. Television commentary created a major shift in sports broadcasting and provided the audience with a direct view of the action while allowing the commentator some freedom to talk about wider aspects of the game, sport or players. As the popularity of television increased, it brought sports commentators into everyday life. The audience saw them as more than just narrators; they became analysts and entertainers.

== Types of commentators ==
=== Main/play-by-play commentator ===
The main commentator, also called the play-by-play commentator or announcer in North America, blow-by-blow in combat sports coverage, lap-by-lap for motorsports coverage, or ball-by-ball for cricket coverage, is the primary speaker and the moderator of the broadcast. Broadcasters in this role describe each play or development as the event unfolds. Because of their skill level, commentators like Al Michaels, Brian Anderson, Ian Eagle, Kevin Harlan, Jim Nantz, and Joe Buck in the US, David Coleman in the UK, and Bruce McAvaney in Australia may have careers in which they call several different sports at one time or another. Other main commentators may, however, only call one sport (Joe Rogan for example announces only one sport which is mixed martial arts, specifically the UFC organization and Peter Drury for the Premier League Football Association). The vast majority of play-by-play announcers are male; female play-by-play announcers had not seen sustained employment until the 21st century.

Radio and television play-by-play require different approaches. Radio commentators typically provide more description because listeners cannot see the action. It is unusual to have radio and television broadcasts share the same play-by-play commentator for the same event, except in cases of low production budgets or when a broadcaster is particularly renowned (Rick Jeanneret's hockey telecasts, for example, were simulcast on radio and television from 1997 until his 2022 retirement).

Radio commentary can create a more intimate connection with the audience because listeners rely on the commentator to follow the action. Commentators therefore use detailed descriptions to help listeners visualize the event. In television broadcasts, viewers can watch the event as it happens, so commentators focus more on analysis and supplementary information. They may use slow motion, instant replays, and other technology to support their commentary.

=== Analyst/color commentator ===
An analyst, also called a color commentator, provides expert analysis and background information, including statistics, team and player strategies, anecdotes, and occasional humor. Analysts are usually former athletes or coaches in the sports they cover, although there are exceptions.

The term "color" refers to the levity and insight provided by the analyst. The most common format for a sports broadcast is to have an analyst/color commentator work alongside the main/play-by-play announcer. An example is NBC Sunday Night Football in the United States, featuring former NFL receiver Cris Collinsworth as the color commentator and Mike Tirico as the play-by-play announcer. In the United Kingdom, the distinction between play-by-play and color commentary is less pronounced. Two-person teams usually pair a lead commentator, with formal journalistic training but little or no competitive experience, with a current or former competitor who provides analysis. There are however exceptions to this—most of the United Kingdom's leading cricket and snooker commentators are former professionals in their sports, while the former Formula One racing commentator Murray Walker had no formal journalistic training and only limited racing experience of his own (he had come from an advertising background and his initial hiring was more of a comic double act than a traditional sports commentary pairing). In the United States, Pat Summerall, a former professional kicker, spent most of his broadcasting career as a play-by-play announcer. Comedian Dennis Miller's short-lived run as part of the Monday Night Football booth in 2001 caused what Miller himself described as a "maelstrom" of perplexed reviews.

Although the combination of a play-by-play announcer and color commentator is now considered the standard, it was much more common for a broadcast to have only one play-by-play announcer working alone. Vin Scully, longtime announcer for the Los Angeles Dodgers, was one of the few examples of this practice lasting into the 21st century until he retired in 2016. The three-person booth is a format used on Monday Night Football, in which there are two color commentators, usually one being a former player or coach and the other being an outsider, such as a journalist (Howard Cosell was one long-running example) or a comedian (such as the before mentioned Dennis Miller).

=== Sideline reporter ===
A sideline reporter assists a sports broadcasting crew with sideline coverage of the playing field or court. The sideline reporter typically makes live updates on injuries and breaking news or conducts player interviews while players are on the field or court because the play-by-play broadcaster and color commentator must remain in their broadcast booth. Sideline reporters are often granted inside information about an important update, such as an injury, because they have the credentials necessary to do so. In cases of big events, teams consisting of many sideline reporters are placed strategically so that the main commentator has many sources to turn to (for example, some sideline reporters could be stationed in the dressing room area while others could be between the respective team benches). In the United States, sideline reporters are heavily restricted by NFL rules; in contrast, both the 2001 and 2020 incarnations of the XFL featured sideline reporters in a much more prominent role.

In motorsports, it is typical for there to be multiple pit reporters covering the event from along the pit road. Their responsibilities include covering breaking news trackside, probing crew chiefs and other team leaders about strategy, and commentating on pit stops from along the pit wall. On occasion in motorsport, the reporter on the sideline is an understudy to the lead commentator, as Fox NASCAR has used this tactic numerous times based on the career of Cup lead Mike Joy, a former pit reporter. Those who made the switch included Steve Byrnes (Truck Series, 2014), Vince Welch (Truck Series since late 2015), and Adam Alexander (who did Cup for Fox-produced TNT broadcasts from 2010–14, Xfinity on Fox since 2015).

=== Sports presenter/studio host ===
In British sports broadcasting, the presenter of a sports broadcast is usually distinct from the commentator, and often based in a remote broadcast television studio away from the sports venue. In North America, the on-air personality based in the studio is called the studio host. During their shows, the presenter/studio host may be joined by additional analysts or pundits, especially when showing highlights of various other matches. In instances of high-profile games, such as a championship, the studio program is produced at or near the site of the game.

=== Other roles ===
Various sports may have different commentator roles to cover situations unique to that sport. In the 2010s, as popularized by Fox, American football broadcasts began to increasingly employ rules analysts to explain penalties and controversial calls and analyze instant replay reviews to predict whether a call will or will not be overturned. This helps viewers who may not understand some of the rules or calls understand further. These analysts are typically former referees.

=== Sportscaster ===
In North American English, sportscaster is a general term for any type of commentator in a sports broadcast. It may also refer to a sports talk show host or a newscaster covering sports news.

=== Esports ===
In video games, and particularly esports, commentators are often called shoutcasters; this term is derived from Shoutcast, an internet audio streaming plugin and protocol associated with the Winamp media player. They are also sometimes referred to as simply casters.

== United States ==
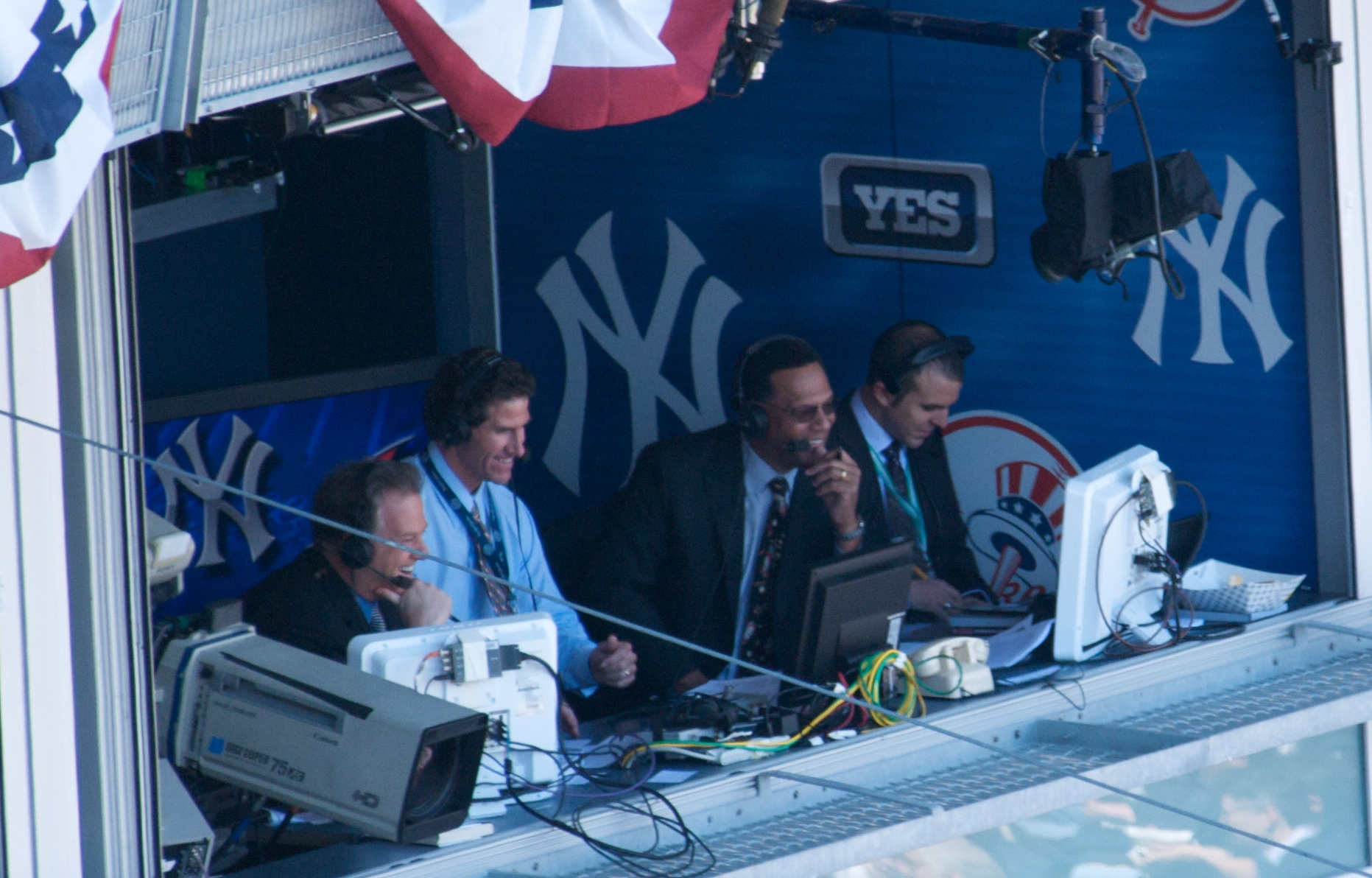
Michael Kay, Ken Singleton, and Paul O'Neill serve as the announcers for most of the New York Yankee games on the YES Network.

While sports broadcasts took place from 1912, Florent Gibson of the Pittsburgh Post newspaper broadcast the first sports commentary in April 1921, covering the fight between Johnny Ray and Johnny "Hutch" Dundee at the Motor Square Garden, Pittsburgh.

One of the highest-paid sportscasters in the United States is Tony Romo, a former NFL quarterback and professional golfer who serves as lead color analyst for the NFL on CBS; Romo earns $17,000,000 per year for his contributions to the network.

Jim Rome is the highest paid sports commentator in the United States, making over $30,000,000 per year. Jim also has his own sports talk show called The Jim Rome Show syndicated by CBS Sports Radio.

== In professional wrestling ==
Professional wrestling commentators John "Bradshaw" Layfield, Michael Cole, and Jerry "The King" Lawler

Though not always the case, in professional wrestling, the color commentator is usually a "heel sympathizer" (or a supporter of the "bad guys") as opposed to the play-by-play announcer, who is more or less the "voice of the fans" as well as "babyface sympathizers" (or supporters of the "good guys"). Though both are supposed to show a neutral stance while announcing, the color commentators (especially when they support heels) are usually more blatant about their stance than the play-by-play announcers. Jesse "The Body" Ventura and Bobby "The Brain" Heenan pioneered the "heel sympathizer" for color commentary in wrestling. Jerry "The King" Lawler later made a successful transition into the same role, though Lawler has since shown more sympathy for faces, partially due to his popularity with fans after a forty-year career.

"Rowdy" Roddy Piper and "Macho Man" Randy Savage pioneered the "babyface sympathizer" for color commentary in wrestling. Michael Cole, as a play-by-play announcer for WWE since 1999, has also portrayed this role for most of his announcing career. From 2010 to 2012, Cole served as a heel announcer, showing arrogance and contempt for faces and more sympathy for the heels (partially due to bullying from other face wrestlers, and jealousy from on-screen authority figures and other commentators). However, after Lawler suffered a legitimate heart attack on the September 10, 2012 episode of Raw, Cole broke character and continued to provide updates on his colleague's condition whilst simultaneously calling the action. His professionalism in the situation led to a slow babyface transition, which was cemented when the two men hugged in the ring upon Lawler's return to commentating two months later.

In some cases, commentators are also active managers for wrestlers, usually following continuity as heels. Former Extreme Championship Wrestling color commentator Cyrus was known for having dual roles as a heel manager and a somewhat neutral commentator, and he continues to play both roles during his clients' matches in New Japan Pro-Wrestling and All Elite Wrestling. Acting as a commentator has also been used to keep injured wrestlers – such as Samoa Joe on Raw between late 2019 and April 2021 – in the public eye while recuperating. Special guest color commentators serve two purposes: the primary is usually to place them in a position to interfere with the match they are calling; the second is to provide promoters with the opportunity to determine if this performer can speak well extemporaneously.

== See also ==
- Announcerless game, December 1980, experimental broadcast of an NFL game without TV commentators
- List of sports announcers
- List of Major League Baseball retired numbers - Broadcasters
