= Heat–Knicks rivalry =

National Basketball Association rivalry

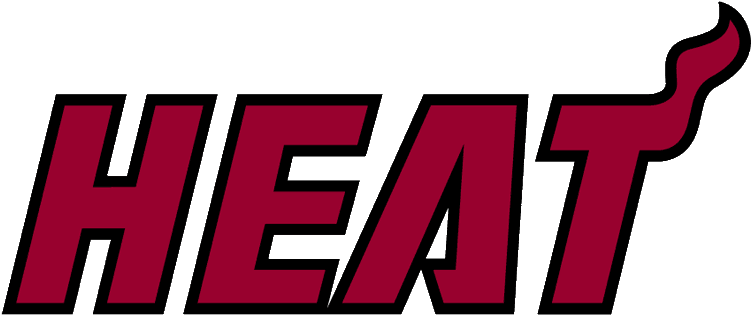
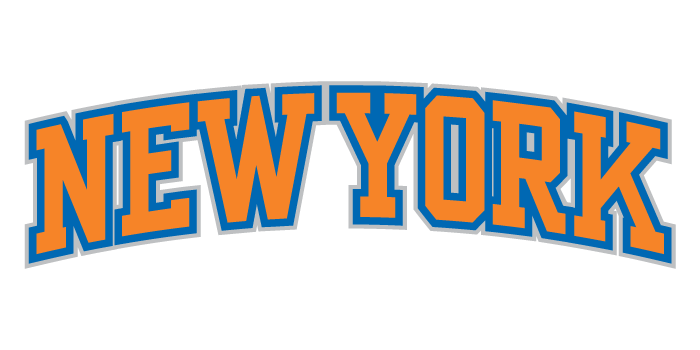
- Miami Heat New York Knicks
- First meeting: March 2, 1989; Knicks 132, Heat 123
- Latest meeting: December 21, 2025; Knicks 132, Heat 125
- Next meeting: November 27, 2026

Statistics
- Total meetings: 179
- All-time series: 92–87 (NYK)
- Regular season series: 76–68 (NYK)
- Postseason results: 19–16 (MIA)
- Longest win streak: NYK W10
- Current win streak: NYK W1

Postseason history
- 1997 Eastern Conference Semifinals: Heat won, 4–3; 1998 Eastern Conference First Round: Knicks won, 3–2; 1999 Eastern Conference First Round: Knicks won, 3–2; 2000 Eastern Conference Semifinals: Knicks won, 4–3; 2012 Eastern Conference First Round: Heat won, 4–1; 2023 Eastern Conference Semifinals: Heat won, 4–2

The Heat–Knicks rivalry is a National Basketball Association (NBA) rivalry between the Miami Heat and the New York Knicks. During the late 1990s and early 2000s, the two teams met in the NBA playoffs four years in a row from 1997 to 2000, with the Knicks winning three of those series and the Heat winning one. The teams most recently met in the Eastern Conference Semifinals of the 2023 NBA playoffs, which the Heat won in six games.

The Heat–Knicks rivalry was one of the fiercest in the NBA, and Sports Illustrated considered it the third-best NBA rivalry. Prior to the 1997 NBA playoffs, no two NBA teams had ever met in the playoffs for four consecutive seasons, with each series going to the maximum possible number of games. The aggressive nature of those four series, defensive struggles marked by numerous foul calls, and intensely physical play, can be traced to the highly defensive style of Pat Riley, former coach of both teams and the rivalry's central figure. This 1990s rivalry created some of the most highly anticipated matchups during its short-lived tenure.

== Background ==
On March 1, 1991, Dave Checketts was named as the team president for the New York Knicks, and hired Riley as head coach for the 1992 season. He turned New York into contenders in a short time, culminating with an Eastern Conference championship in 1994 before losing to Houston in the 1994 NBA Finals, which denied New York from having NBA and NHL championships in the same year, as the Rangers won game seven of the 1994 Stanley Cup Final over the Canucks during the Finals.

Unable to repeat a trip to the Finals in 1995, Riley stepped down as the Knicks' head coach. At the time, many speculated either that he thought the Knicks were no longer a title threat and wanted to move on, or wanted more power. Riley answered that question on September 2, 1995, when he took over as team president and head coach of the Miami Heat. His move caused some controversy, as the Knicks accused Miami of tampering while he was still under contract, which was settled after Miami sent their 1996 first round pick (#19 – Walter McCarty) and $1 million in cash to New York on September 1, 1995. Before the rivalry began the most notable occurrence between the teams was the Heat ending the Knicks' 15-game win streak in 1994.

== 1997–2000: Four consecutive playoff matchups ==
=== 1997 Eastern Conference semifinals ===
In only Riley's second season as Miami's head coach, the Heat dethroned New York as Atlantic Division champions. This set up one of the most dramatic playoff series in NBA history, when these teams met in the Eastern Conference Semifinals. The matchup was set up when the Knicks swept the Charlotte Hornets and the Heat needing the full five games to dispose of their in-state rivals the Orlando Magic in the opening round. Game 1, which the Knicks won 88–79, was iced by Patrick Ewing's dunk on Alonzo Mourning. A Jamal Mashburn 3 point shot put Game 2 out of reach and tied the series at 1 with an 88–84 victory. In Game 3 in New York, Ewing blocked a potential game-tying 3 point shot from Tim Hardaway, then secured the loose ball. The Knicks won 77–73. New York won Game 4 89–76, dominating Miami to gain a 3–1 series lead.

Miami won Game 5 96–81, in which a brawl that started when P.J. Brown objected to Charlie Ward's attempt to gain position for a rebound. Brown flipped Ward over and threw him to the ground, and a melee ensued. The Knicks and their fans speculated that Riley told Brown to start a brawl hoping that Knicks players would get suspended, thinking the series was easier to win against a full-strength Knicks team that many considered superb. Alternatively, other observers questioned why Ward dived toward Brown's legs with the game out of reach. Worth noting is that Brown is much taller than Ward. During the brawl, Patrick Ewing, Allan Houston, Larry Johnson and John Starks left the bench; the league punished them for this by handing out 1-game suspensions spread out over the series' final 2 games. Ewing, Houston and Ward were suspended for Game 6; Johnson and Starks were suspended for Game 7. Shorthanded by the suspensions, the Knicks lost Games 6 and 7 95–90 and 101–90 respectively. The Heat advanced, and lost to the Bulls in the Eastern Conference Finals in 5 games.

=== 1998 Eastern Conference first round ===
The Miami Heat once again captured the Atlantic Division crown in 1998. New York regressed and were the seventh seed in the Eastern Conference largely due to Ewing suffering a severely broken wrist that forced him to miss most of the regular season. With Chicago again the #1 seed, the Heat played against the Knicks in a rematch of their series the year before. Miami won Game 1, 94–79, but the Knicks bounced back and won Game 2, 96–86 to tie the series at 1 game each. Miami won Game 3, 91–85 to take a 2–1 series lead. But New York won Game 4, 90–85, in which a fight between Alonzo Mourning and Larry Johnson (who had been teammates in Charlotte) occurred at the end of the game. Although neither landed a punch, the fight famously saw Knicks coach Jeff Van Gundy grab on to Mourning's legs in an unsuccessful attempt to break the fight up. The NBA suspended Mourning and Johnson for the fight.

Without Mourning, the Knicks jumped out to a 20-point halftime lead in Game 5. However, Miami chipped away at it in the third and fourth quarters. In the fourth, Tim Hardaway connected on a number of 3 point shots, until with over 6 minutes left, the Heat only trailed 72–70. With the momentum and crowd behind them, the Heat seemed poised to overtake New York. However, the Knicks retook the momentum on a sequence consisting of a Ward 3-pointer, an Allan Houston jump shot and free throw, and then a fast-break layup by Charles Oakley, on which he was fouled from behind and fell into the stands. This was ruled a flagrant foul- the Knicks shot free throws and retained possession. On the extra possession, Starks hit a 3 point shot that extended the Knicks' lead to 13. Miami did not challenge New York for the rest of the game, and the Knicks won the series with a 98–81 victory in Miami. New York then lost in the Eastern Conference Semifinals to Indiana in 5 games.

=== 1999 Eastern Conference first round ===
The lockout-shortened 1998–99 season saw the Heat try to move past the previous year's playoff disappointment as Michael Jordan's retirement saw the Bulls quickly fade as an NBA title threat. Miami beat the Indiana Pacers and the Orlando Magic to reach the top of the Eastern Conference. The Knicks season finished with a 27–23 record, qualifying for the playoffs as a #8 seed. This put the odds in Miami's favor, as an #8 seed had defeated a #1 seed in the first round just once in NBA history. However, the Knicks won Game 1 95–75 in Miami. The Heat won 83–73 in Game 2 to tie the series at 1. Back home for Game 3, New York beat Miami 97–73 to take a 2–1 series lead. The Knicks had a chance to clinch the series at home in Game 4. They held an 8-point lead but Miami won 87–72. Game 5 was a defensive struggle all the way. Miami held a 77–76 lead with 4.5 seconds left, but Allan Houston hit a running 1-hander that bounced off the front rim, then the backboard, and in with 8 tenths of a second left to give New York a 78–77 victory.

The win propelled an improbable run for the Knicks in the playoffs. They swept the Hawks in the semifinals and defeated the Pacers in 6 to clinch their second Eastern Conference Title in five years and advance to the 1999 NBA Finals, where they lost to the Spurs. In doing that, the Knicks became the only 8th-seeded team in NBA history to reach the NBA Finals before the 2023 Miami Heat did it.

=== 2000 Eastern Conference semifinals ===
While the Heat won the Atlantic Division for the 4th year in a row, the Knicks were right on their tail, finishing only two games back and capturing the third seed. After both teams easily swept their opening round series (the Knicks sweeping the Toronto Raptors and the Heat sweeping the Detroit Pistons), the two teams met again in the Eastern Conference Semifinals, in what would be the most evenly matched of all 4 series. The Heat won Game 1 87–83 at home to take a 1–0 series lead, but New York tied the series at 1 with an 82–76 victory in Game 2. Game 3 in New York was one of the series' most notable. Ewing hit a jumper with 2.4 seconds left to force OT. He also made 1 of 2 free throws in the final seconds of OT to give New York a 76–75 lead. On Miami's final possession, rookie Anthony Carter drove from the baseline and launched a tough and maybe illegal shot from behind the backboard. It dropped onto the front rim and fell in with 2.1 seconds left. After a referee's conference, they ruled it counted, despite protests from the Knicks. It won the game for Miami 77–76. The Knicks then won Game 4 91–83 on Charlie Ward's 21 points to tie the series at 2.

Back in Miami for Game 5, the Heat came from behind with a sequence of 3's in the final 2 minutes (2 from Dan Majerle and the last one from Bruce Bowen), and won 87–81. Miami had a chance to clinch the series in Game 6 at Madison Square Garden, but blew a 45–30 halftime lead. New York cut it to 6 in the first 3 minutes of the 3rd quarter. Ewing made a difficult tip-dunk off a missed jumpshot to cut the lead to 2 with 2 minutes left. Allan Houston hit 2 free throws with 22 seconds left to give the Knicks a 72–70 lead. Anthony Carter missed a 3 at the buzzer that would have won the series. In a press conference after the game, Pat Riley remarked, "This is absolute madness."

In yet another Game 7, the Heat took an 11-point lead in the first half, before the Knicks rallied to make the game close in the final minutes. Tim Hardaway gave Miami an 82–81 lead when he drained a 3 with 1:32 left. The Knicks responded when Alonzo Mourning gambled and attempted a steal on Patrick Ewing. The move failed, allowing Ewing an easy dunk. The Heat had a chance in the final seconds to retake the lead, but Clarence Weatherspoon missed a jumper over Marcus Camby with 7 seconds left, giving the Knicks another playoff series victory over Miami. The Knicks advanced to an Eastern Conference Finals rematch with the Pacers, but this time Indiana won in 6 to advance to the 2000 NBA Finals where they lost to the Lakers.

== 1997–2000: Notable regular season matchups ==
In the April 12, 1997 game in Miami, the Knicks led by 3 in the final minute, when Miami guard Sasha Danilovic made what appeared to be a 3 to tie the game. However, referees ruled that Danilovic's foot was on the line, and ruled the basket only a 2. Replays showed that the call was correct, but also very close. The Knicks went on to win the game by 1. Although the Knicks put pressure on the Heat with the victory, Miami hung on and won the Atlantic Division by 4 games.

In the Easter Sunday game in Miami on April 12, 1998, the Knicks trailed 82–81 with 4.2 seconds left and the ball at half-court. Terry Cummings received an inbounds pass and shot a short leaner on the baseline that hit the rim and bounced away. Several tips ensued from players on both teams positioned by the basket. The sequence ended when Allan Houston tipped the ball in at the buzzer for an apparent game-winner, however the referees ruled it to be after the buzzer and awarded the game to Miami. Replays later ruled that Houston last touched the ball with 0.2 seconds left and the basket should have counted. Jeff Van Gundy and the Knicks protested the game's outcome, but were denied by the league office.

In the April 25, 1999 game in Miami, the Heat took a 20-point lead on the Knicks in the first half and maintained it well into the 2nd half. The game entered the 4th quarter with Miami still up by 16, but the Knicks came back, outscoring the Heat 34–16 in the final quarter to win 82–80 and help jump-start the slumping Knicks, who were only 22–21 at this time, to a final surge which would lead to them capturing the #8 seed in the playoffs and eventually defeat top-seeded Miami in the first round that year.

In the April 9, 2000 game in Miami, a hotly contested game was sent to overtime due to a sequence in which center Patrick Ewing grabbed three offensive rebounds off missed Knick 3-pointers before finally finding point guard Chris Childs who connected on a 3 with only seconds left, tying the game. Miami was unable to score, hence the overtime. In OT, Childs was in the spotlight again. With the Knicks leading 93–92, Childs was intentionally fouled and sent to the line. He made one to give New York a 94–92 lead. The Heat had 4.5 seconds left to inbound from half-court and score. The ball went to point guard Tim Hardaway, who could not shake free from Childs. He ended up forcing a 3 from an awkward angle with Childs covering him tightly. It improbably went in at the buzzer, giving Miami a bedlam-inducing 95–94 win. This game was seen as the game in which the Heat pulled away for the race for 1st in the Atlantic Division.

== 2000–2010: Decline of the rivalry ==
In the years following the 2000 playoffs, the rivalry greatly weakened; in the 2000 offseason the Knicks traded longtime center Patrick Ewing to the Seattle SuperSonics and the Miami Heat traded cornerstones Jamal Mashburn and P.J. Brown to the Charlotte Hornets. In its prime, this rivalry was very physical and marked by low-scoring, defensive-oriented affairs, with players on both teams giving their best effort in every game.

However, some notable games between the Heat and Knicks have taken place in recent years.

On March 15, 2005, Heat guard Dwyane Wade hit the game-winner at the buzzer against the Knicks in New York to beat them 98–96.

On January 26, 2007, Knicks guard Jamal Crawford scored a career-high 52 points on 20–30 shooting, including 8 3-pointers, against the Heat en route to a 116–96 victory for New York.

On February 28, 2009, Dwyane Wade scored 24 points in the fourth quarter, helping the Heat overcome a 16-point second-half deficit to defeat the Knicks 120–115. Wade's late-game heroics were catalyzed by some rough-housing at the hands of Knicks forward Danilo Gallinari, who accidentally elbowed Wade in the face, causing his lip to bleed without a foul being called. Then, Al Harrington knocked down Wade while he tried to go to the rim.

On April 12, 2009, Dwyane Wade scored a career-high 55 points against the Knicks at American Airlines Arena. His performance was one point shy of the Miami Heat record set by Glen Rice's 56-point outburst against the Orlando Magic on April 15, 1995.

== 2010–2014: Miami's Big Three ==
During the summer of 2010, former Cleveland Cavaliers superstar LeBron James became a free agent. After being courted by many teams (including both the Knicks and Heat), he announced his decision to join the Miami Heat on national television on July 8, 2010, much to the frustration of many NBA fans. The Knicks like many other NBA teams had all spent their last two seasons re-engineering rosters to accommodate James' potential contract. Earlier that week, former Phoenix Suns forward Amar'e Stoudemire announced his intention to sign with the New York Knicks.

On December 17, 2010, the Knicks and Heat met for the first time that season. The Heat won, 113–91, at Madison Square Garden. On February 21, 2011, the Knicks acquired All-Star small forward Carmelo Anthony in a three team trade involving the Denver Nuggets and Minnesota Timberwolves. On February 27, 2011, The Knicks faced the Heat at Miami for the first time since acquiring Carmelo Anthony and Chauncey Billups and won 91–86. The Knicks and Heat would eventually split the regular season series 2–2.

The Knicks improved in the lockout-shortened 2011-12 NBA season, in part due to the acquisition of point guard Jeremy Lin. The Knicks-Heat game scheduled prior to the All-Star break (the last game for both teams before the break) was billed as giving the rivalry new life, with the average price of resold seats going for $600 and courtside seats going for $8,000. However, the Heat beat the Knicks 102–88 in Miami, and eventually swept the season series 3–0 which squashed any semblance of re-igniting a rivalry. Miami with their acquisitions were far and away the better team, they had won 10 more games than New York to finish the season as the #2 seed, while the Knicks clawed in as the 7th seed, avoiding missing the playoffs by 1 game. The two teams eventually met in the 2012 NBA playoffs, their first playoff meeting since 2000 to which the Heat won in 5 games without much challenge.

On November 2, 2012, The Knicks' opener against the Brooklyn Nets at the Barclays Center was postponed due to the effects of Hurricane Sandy and the damage it caused to New York and New Jersey, such as flooding and leaving millions without power. Thus, the Knicks' first game and home opener of the season ended up being against the Heat. The Knicks beat the Heat 104–84 with Carmelo Anthony scoring 30 points and the Knicks' bench shooting nineteen 3-pointers. Knicks won the next meeting in Miami without Carmelo Anthony, Iman Shumpert, or Amar'e Stoudamire. Knicks won the season series 3–1 and were the only team in the regular season to beat the Heat 3 times. However it proved meaningless as the Heat went on to be only the third team since 1970 to win over 80% of their games, on their way to a second consecutive NBA Championship.

=== Playoffs ===
==== 2012 Eastern Conference first round ====
Towards the end of the 2011–2012 season, with the Heat in the second seed and the Knicks in the seventh seed, anticipation for the first playoff match in 12 years started to build. Knicks fans started chanting "Beat the Heat" at Madison Square Garden during the second-to-last game of the regular season. Carmelo Anthony acknowledged "The fans know what they want, know what they want to see. Hopefully, they get to see that." Likewise, Heat guard Dwyane Wade said: "I have been here awhile and I have seen the games that we've won against New York and how the people in the organization feel every time. You can tell there is something always there. So, in my mind, we're playing the Knicks. That's the mind state that I have and I think I've had it for the last week." The Miami Herald further commented: "the NBA would be hard-pressed to find a better marquee game for its Sunday afternoon slot than the opening game between the Heat and Knicks." After a Knicks victory in the final game of the season, it was finally confirmed that the two teams would play each other in the first round of the 2012 playoffs, with the Miami Herald again commenting: "As first-round series go, it doesn’t get any bigger for the Heat.

The media tried to hype up this series as rivalry, but it fell flat, effectively ending any notion of rivalry beyond the 1999 season. The Heat easily defeated the Knicks in Game 1 by 33 points. Game 2 was a much closer affair but the Heat still won by 10 points. In Game 3 in MSG, the Heat found themselves on the wrong end in the first half, trailing by as much as 11 points, before closing in the half with a 7–0 run. The Heat led by 2 after the third quarter. However, LeBron James quickly sparked an 8–0 run to start the fourth quarter, giving them a 10-point lead. The Knicks never recovered. James himself outscored the Knicks in the fourth, 17–14. By losing Game 3, the Knicks set a new league record by losing 13 straight playoff games, their last win coming April 29, 2001, in their series versus the Toronto Raptors. Game 4 was different from the first three games. In the third, Baron Davis injured himself. He left the court on a stretcher. However, led by Carmelo Anthony, who scored 41 points, the Knicks prevented a sweep, 89–87, as Wade missed the potential series-winning three-pointer at the buzzer. In Game 5, the Knicks started strong but it was all Miami the rest of the way. The Heat led by 11 at the end of the first half. The Heat never squandered the lead the rest of the way, effectively sealing the game and the series with a three-pointer by Shane Battier that gave the Heat a 14-point lead with a minute left in the game. The Knicks were led by Anthony's 35. Amar'e Stoudemire, meanwhile, was plagued by foul trouble. He fouled out with about 4 minutes left in the game. The Heat would go on to win the 2012 NBA Finals against the Oklahoma City Thunder.

=== 2023 Еastern Conference semifinals ===
The Heat and Knicks faced each other in the 2023 Еastern Conference semifinals. It was the first playoff series that New York held home-court advantage against Miami, thanks to their 47–35 regular season record against the Heat’s 44–38 record. The Heat started off the series by stealing Game 1 at MSG 108–101. The Knicks then answered back with a 111–105 victory in Game 2. Miami responded by winning Games 3 and 4 105–86 and 109–101 respectively to take a commanding 3–1 series lead. New York won Game 5 112–103 to make it 3–2, but Miami closed them out in Game 6, 96–92, to advance to the Eastern Conference finals.

== Season-by-season results ==
Miami Heat vs. New York Knicks Season-by-Season Results
1980s (Knicks, 6–2)

Season	Season series		at Miami Heat	at New York Knicks	Overall series	Notes
1988–89	Tie	1–1	Heat, 107–103	Knicks, 132–123	Tie; 1–1	Miami Heat join the NBA as an expansion team and are placed in the Western Conference and the Midwest Division. On March 2, 1989, Knicks beat the Heat 132–123, their most points scored in a game against the Heat. Only season where the Heat and Knicks faced each other for two games per season.
1989–90	Knicks	5–1	Knicks, 2–1	Knicks, 3–0	Knicks; 6–2	Heat are moved to the Eastern Conference and are placed in the Atlantic Division, becoming divisional rivals with the Knicks.

1990s (Knicks, 39–22)

Season	Season series		at Miami Heat	at New York Knicks	Overall series	Notes
1990–91	Knicks	4–1	Knicks, 2–1	Knicks, 2–0	Knicks; 10–3	
1991–92	Knicks	4–1	Tie, 1–1	Knicks, 3–0	Knicks; 14–4	
1992–93	Knicks	5–0	Knicks, 3–0	Knicks, 2–0	Knicks; 19–4	Knicks sweep the season series over the Heat for the first time. Knicks win the Atlantic Division.
1993–94	Tie	2–2	Heat, 2–0	Knicks, 2–0	Knicks; 21–6	On November 22, 1993, Knicks beat the Heat 119–87, their largest victory over the Heat with a 32-point differential. Knicks win 13 home games in a row against the Heat. Knicks win the Atlantic Division. Knicks lose 1994 NBA Finals.
1994–95	Knicks	4–1	Knicks, 2–0	Knicks, 2–1	Knicks; 25–7	
1995–96	Knicks	3–1	Tie, 1–1	Knicks, 2–0	Knicks; 28–8	
1996–97	Knicks	3–1	Knicks, 2–0	Tie, 1–1	Knicks; 31–9	Heat win their first Atlantic Division title.
1997 Eastern Conference Semifinals	Heat	4–3	Heat, 3–1	Knicks, 2–1	Knicks; 34–13	1st postseason series. In Game 3, Patrick Ewing blocked Tim Hardaway's 3-point attempt with three seconds to preserve the Knicks victory. Game 5 featured a brawl between P.J. Brown and Charlie Ward. Heat become the 6th team in NBA history to comeback from a 3–1 series deficit.
1997–98	Tie	2–2	Heat, 2–0	Knicks, 2–0	Knicks; 36–15	Heat win the Atlantic Division.
1998 Eastern Conference First Round	Knicks	3–2	Knicks, 2–1	Tie, 1–1	Knicks; 39–17	2nd postseason series. Game 4 featured a brawl between Alonzo Mourning and Larry Johnson.
1998–99	Tie	2–2	Tie, 1–1	Tie, 1–1	Knicks; 41–19	Heat win the Atlantic Division.
1999 Eastern Conference First Round	Knicks	3–2	Knicks, 2–1	Tie, 1–1	Knicks; 44–21	3rd postseason series. Allan Houston hit the series-winning shot with 0.8 seconds to complete the upset for the Knicks. Knicks become the first team in NBA history to beat a top 2 seed in the First Round in back-to-back seasons, with both victories coming against the Heat. Heat became the first team in NBA history to not get past the First Round as a top 2 seed in consecutive seasons while also becoming the second #1 seed to lose a playoff series against a #8 seed in the First Round. Knicks go on to lose 1999 NBA Finals.
1999–2000	Heat	3–1	Heat, 2–0	Tie, 1–1	Knicks; 45–24	Last season Heat played at Miami Arena. On January 2, 2000, Heat open up and move to American Airlines Arena (now known as Kaseya Center). Heat win the season series over the Knicks in the regular season for the first time. Heat win their last Atlantic Division title.

2000s (Heat, 24–21)

Season	Season series		at Miami Heat	at New York Knicks	Overall series	Notes
2000 Eastern Conference Semifinals	Knicks	4–3	Tie, 2–2	Knicks, 2–1	Knicks; 49–27	4th postseason series. Heat and Knicks meet in the playoffs four consecutive times.
2000–01	Knicks	3–2	Tie, 1–1	Knicks, 2–1	Knicks; 52–29	
2001–02	Tie	2–2	Tie, 1–1	Tie, 1–1	Knicks; 54–31	
2002–03	Tie	2–2	Tie, 1–1	Tie, 1–1	Knicks; 56–33	
2003–04	Knicks	3–1	Knicks, 2–1	Tie, 1–1	Knicks; 59–34	
2004–05	Heat	4–0	Heat, 2–0	Heat, 2–0	Knicks; 59–38	Heat move to the Southeast Division, making them no longer divisional rivals with the Knicks. Heat sweep the season series against the Knicks and finish with a winning record in New York for the first time.
2005–06	Heat	3–0	Heat, 1–0	Heat, 2–0	Knicks; 59–41	Heat win 2006 NBA Finals, their first NBA Championship.
2006–07	Knicks	3–1	Tie, 1–1	Knicks, 2–0	Knicks; 62–42	
2007–08	Knicks	3–1	Knicks, 2–0	Tie, 1–1	Knicks; 65–43	
2008–09	Heat	2–1	Heat, 2–0	Knicks, 1–0	Knicks; 66–45	
2009–10	Heat	3–0	Heat, 1–0	Heat, 2–0	Knicks; 66–48	

2010s (Heat, 26–13)

Season	Season series		at Miami Heat	at New York Knicks	Overall series	Notes
2010–11	Tie	2–2	Tie, 1–1	Tie, 1–1	Knicks; 68–50	Heat lose 2011 NBA Finals.
2011–12	Heat	3–0	Heat, 2–0	Heat, 1–0	Knicks; 68–53	
2012 Eastern Conference First Round	Heat	4–1	Heat, 3–0	Tie, 1–1	Knicks; 69–57	5th postseason series. In game 1, Heat beat the Knicks 100–67, their largest victory over the Knicks with a 33-point differential. By losing Game 3, the Knicks set a new league record at the time by losing 13 straight playoff games (later broken by the Pistons). Heat go on to win 2012 NBA Finals.
2012–13	Knicks	3–1	Knicks, 2–0	Tie, 1–1	Knicks; 72–58	Heat finish with the best record in the league (66–16). Heat win 2013 NBA Finals.
2013–14	Heat	3–1	Heat, 2–0	Tie, 1–1	Knicks; 73–61	Heat lose 2014 NBA Finals.
2014–15	Heat	3–0	Heat, 1–0	Heat, 2–0	Knicks; 73–64	
2015–16	Heat	3–1	Tie, 1–1	Heat, 2–0	Knicks; 74–67	
2016–17	Knicks	2–1	Knicks, 2–0	Heat, 1–0	Knicks; 76–68	
2017–18	Tie	2–2	Heat, 2–0	Knicks, 2–0	Knicks; 78–70	
2018–19	Heat	3–0	Heat, 1–0	Heat, 2–0	Knicks; 78–73	
2019–20	Tie	1–1	Heat, 129–114	Knicks, 124–121	Knicks; 79–74	On December 20, 2019, at Miami, Heat scored 129 points, their most in a game against the Knicks. Due to the COVID-19 pandemic suspending the season, their remaining meetings, one at each team's home arena, were canceled. Heat lose 2020 NBA Finals.

2020s (Tie, 13–13)

Season	Season series		at Miami Heat	at New York Knicks	Overall series	Notes
2020–21	Heat	3–0	Heat, 1–0	Heat, 2–0	Knicks; 79–77	
2021–22	Heat	2–1	Tie, 1–1	Heat, 1–0	Knicks; 80–79	
2022–23	Knicks	3–1	Tie, 1–1	Knicks, 2–0	Knicks; 83–80	
2023 Eastern Conference Semifinals	Heat	4–2	Heat, 3–0	Knicks, 2–1	Knicks; 85–84	6th postseason series. Heat become the second 8th seed to reach the conference finals. Heat go on to lose 2023 NBA Finals.
2023–24	Knicks	2–1	Heat, 1–0	Knicks, 2–0	Knicks; 87–85	On November 24, 2023, at New York, the Knicks beat the Heat 100–98 during the 2023 NBA In-Season Tournament group stage.
2024–25	Knicks	3–0	Knicks, 2–0	Knicks, 1–0	Knicks; 90–85	
2025–26	Tie	2–2	Heat, 2–0	Knicks, 2–0	Knicks; 92–87	On November 14, 2025, at New York, the Knicks beat the Heat 140–132 during the 2025 NBA Cup group stage. Knicks won East Group C via this head-to-head tiebreaker; Heat finished second and advanced as East wildcard. Knicks win 2025 NBA Cup. Knicks win 2026 NBA Finals.
2026–27	Tie	0-0	December 12th, 2026	November 27th, 2026 and January 14th, 2027	Knicks; 92–87	The game on November 27, 2026, at New York is a 2026 NBA Cup group stage game.

Summary of Results

Season	Season series		at Miami Heat	at New York Knicks	Notes
Regular season games	Knicks	76–68	Heat, 39–32	Knicks, 44–29	
Postseason games	Heat	19–16	Heat, 13–7	Knicks, 9–6	
Postseason series	Tie	3–3	Tie, 3–3	N/A	Eastern Conference First Round: 1998, 1999, 2012; Eastern Conference Semifinals: 1997, 2000, 2023
Regular and postseason	Knicks	92–87	Heat, 52–39	Knicks, 53–35	

== Individual Records ==
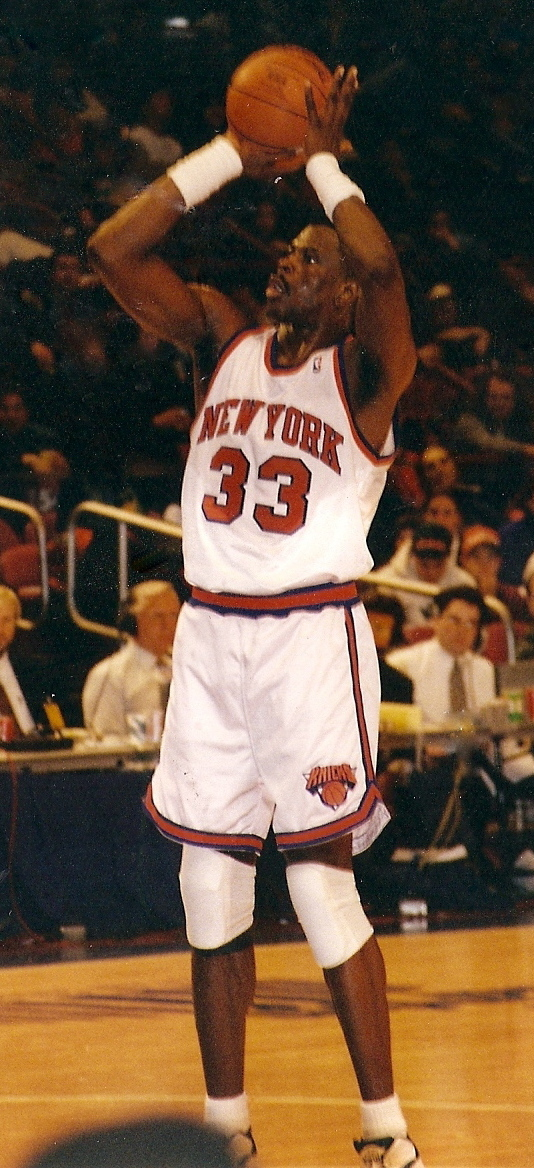
Patrick Ewing scored the most points in the regular season in this rivalry.

=== Top Scorers (Regular Season) ===
Rank	Player	Team	Points	GP	PPG
1	Patrick Ewing	Knicks	1,001	45	22.2
2	Dwyane Wade	Heat	959	40	24.0
3	Allan Houston	Knicks	550	33	16.7
4	Glen Rice	Heat/Knicks	530	33	16.1
5	Carmelo Anthony	Knicks	482	18	26.8
6	Alonzo Mourning	Heat	468	29	15.9
7	Charles Oakley	Knicks	418	39	10.7
8	John Starks	Knicks	396	33	12.0
9	LeBron James	Heat	395	14	28.2
9	Rony Seikaly	Heat	395	23	17.2

==== Per Game (Regular Season, min. 10 GP) ====
1. LeBron James (MIA) – 28.2 (14 GP)
2. Carmelo Anthony (NYK) – 26.8 (18 GP)
3. Dwyane Wade (MIA) – 24.0 (40 GP)
4. Jimmy Butler (MIA) – 22.5 (15 GP)
5. Patrick Ewing (NYK) – 22.2 (45 GP)
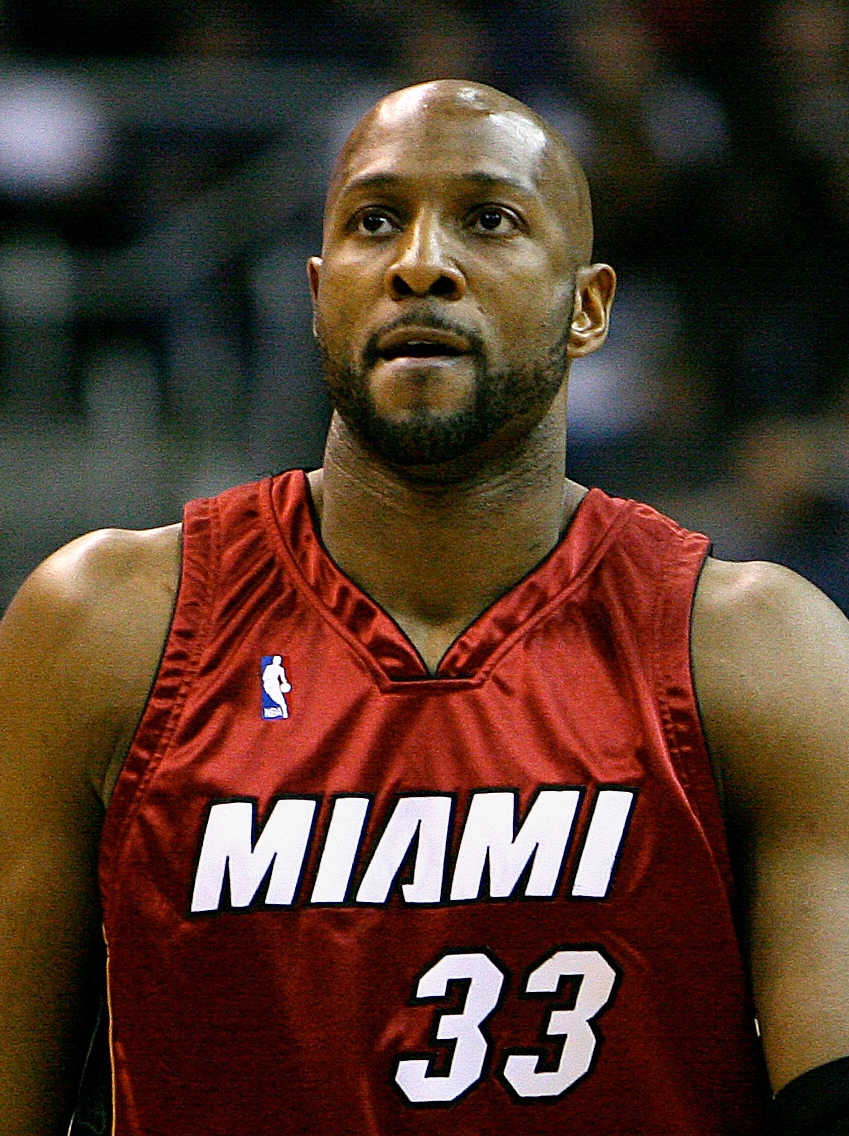
  Alonzo Mourning scored the most points in the postseason of this rivalry.

=== Top Scorers (NBA Playoffs) ===
Rank	Player	Team	Points	GP	PPG
1	Alonzo Mourning	Knicks	481	23	20.9
2	Allan Houston	Knicks	420	23	18.3
3	Tim Hardaway	Heat	389	24	16.2
4	Patrick Ewing	Knicks	317	18	17.6
5	Larry Johnson	Knicks	276	22	12.5
6	Jamal Mashburn	Heat	253	24	10.5
7	Latrell Sprewell	Knicks	205	12	17.1

==== Per Game (Playoffs) ====
1. Jalen Brunson (NYK) – 31.0 (6 GP)
2. Carmelo Anthony (NYK), LeBron James (MIA) – 27.8 (6 GP)
3. Jimmy Butler (MIA) – 24.6 (5 GP)
4. Dwyane Wade (MIA) – 21.0 (5 GP)

== See also ==
- National Basketball Association rivalries
- Dolphins–Jets rivalry – an NFL rivalry

== Notes ==
In all but one series (the Semifinal matchup in 2023), Miami had home-court advantage. Also, the winner of the first four series wasn't decided until the waning moments of each final game, with both teams playing all 24 possible playoff games against one another over the 4-year span (in '98 and '99 the 1st Round was only best-of-5 at the time).

An interesting twist to the 1990s rivalry was that Alonzo Mourning and Patrick Ewing both having attended Georgetown University, were close friends off the court and managed to keep their friendship strong throughout the rivalry, often having dinner together after every game. Mourning admitted it was difficult to remain friendly during this time in which he frequently lost to his friend/mentor, Ewing.
