= Announcerless game =

1980 American football game broadcast without commentators

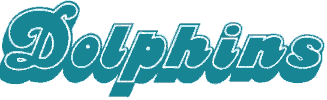
New York Jets (3–12)	Miami Dolphins (8–7)
24	17
Head coach: Walt Michaels	Head coach: Don Shula
	1	2	3	4	Total
NYJ	7	7	7	3	24
MIA	10	0	0	7	17
- Date: December 20, 1980
- Stadium: Miami Orange Bowl; Miami, Florida
- Favorite: Dolphins by 6
- Referee: Fred Silva
- Attendance: 41,854

TV in the United States
- Network: NBC
- Announcers: None

The announcerless game was an American football contest played on December 20, 1980, between the New York Jets and the Miami Dolphins of the National Football League. As an experiment, the NBC television network broadcast it without assigning any commentators to cover it. The two teams were playing the last game of that season for them as neither had qualified for the playoffs, and since the game was being broadcast nationally NBC executive Don Ohlmeyer decided on the idea to boost what would otherwise have been weak ratings. The Jets won a 24–17 upset victory.

To replace the announcers, the network used more on-screen graphics than usual and asked the public address announcer at the Miami Orange Bowl stadium to impart more information than he typically did. Efforts to use more sensitive microphones and pick up more sound from the field, however, did not succeed. While the experiment did increase the telecast's ratings, it was widely regarded as a failure since it did not provide sufficient context for viewers. No network, cable or internet broadcaster of any major American professional sports team tried an announcerless game broadcast again, except through alternate feeds of games offered without announcers, until a July 3, 2022, baseball game on Peacock between the Royals and Tigers.

== Background ==
Don Ohlmeyer, then executive producer of NBC's telecasts of National Football League (NFL) games, began considering doing a telecast without announcers early in the 1980 season. Ohlmeyer had long believed that the announcers were overly chatty and did not let the game speak for itself when they needed to. Additionally, while NBC primarily covered the games of the NFL's American Football Conference (AFC) teams, it was earning ratings almost as good as those of rival CBS, who at the time was broadcasting games involving teams from the National Football Conference (NFC). A game without announcers might well attract enough viewers to put NBC past CBS.

In October of that year, reports began to circulate that Ohlmeyer was considering the idea. He confirmed it but said he would only actually do it for a game that had no playoff implications. The last week of the season gave him the chance, with a contest scheduled for Saturday, when it would be shown nationally, between the New York Jets and the Miami Dolphins.

Although both teams had already been eliminated from the playoffs, they had reasons to win beyond ending their seasons on an upbeat note. The Dolphins, hosting the Jets at the Miami Orange Bowl, their home stadium at the time, had the better record at 8–7. Las Vegas oddsmakers made them 6-point favorites. Despite that line, however, they had not only lost to the Jets earlier that season, a loss that was widely believed to have been the one that put the Dolphins out of the playoffs since the Jets had been the only team the Dolphins lost to that they had been expected to beat. That loss had been their fifth straight to their AFC East division rivals; Miami had not beaten the Jets since 1977 despite an otherwise superior record during those seasons. The Dolphins were also bringing a three-game winning streak into the contest; a victory would redeem their failure to reach the playoffs with a winning record for the season.

Coming into the game at 3–12, the Jets, touted by Jimmy the Greek at the beginning of the season as a possible Super Bowl contender, had long abandoned any hopes of the playoffs. But they, too, had something to prove. The visitors were coming off an embarrassing loss at home to the New Orleans Saints, the only team in the league with a worse record, who had come from behind late in the game for their only victory of the season. The team's owners were reportedly divided as to whether to retain head coach Walt Michaels for another season.

Reaction was mixed, ranging from "good-natured humor to applause to some surprising anger," as Bryant Gumbel would later put it on air shortly before the telecast started. "My first reaction was of incredible nerve, nervousness," Dick Enberg, one of the NBC announcers, recalled to ESPN 30 years later. "We all gathered together, hoping that Ohlmeyer was dead wrong ... What if this crazy idea really worked?" Dolphins' defensive end Bob Baumhower was also apprehensive about what viewers might overhear among the players. "I hope we're all extra careful," he said. "There's a lot of extra talking going on out there that people don't realize."

== Game ==
The game started at 12:30 p.m. The weather was seasonal for Miami, with temperatures around 69 °F (21 °C) and 12-mile-per-hour (19 km/h) winds. A total of 41,854 came to see the game at the Miami Orange Bowl, meaning the game was blacked out in south Florida.

Miami took an early lead with a 21-yard Uwe von Schamann field goal. After the Jets' Scott Dierking scored the game's first touchdown on a short plunge into the end zone, Duriel Harris caught a 16-yard touchdown pass from rookie quarterback David Woodley. The first quarter ended with the Dolphins up 10–7.

Dierking went in from just outside the end zone once again three seconds before halftime to put the Jets ahead for good. The Jets were weaker offensively the whole game, gaining fewer yards overall and turning over the ball five times. However, it was one of the two Dolphin turnovers that ultimately made the difference in the third quarter, when rookie safety Darrol Ray went 71 yards for a score after intercepting a Woodley pass, his first career interception return for a score. Woodley brought his team to within four with a one-yard touchdown run in the fourth quarter; Jets kicker Pat Leahy completed the scoring with a 35-yard field goal. The season ended for both teams with the Jets victorious, 24–17, leaving the Dolphins with a .500 finish.

The win cost the Jets the second overall pick in the 1981 NFL draft (they would have clinched that spot by losing or tying). The cross-town rival Giants lost to the eventual Super Bowl champion Oakland Raiders the next day, leaving both New York teams and the Seattle Seahawks with 4-12 records. Tiebreakers slotted the Giants second, the Jets third and the Seahawks fourth, with teams rotating those spots through the remaining 11 rounds.

== Telecast ==
Ohlmeyer and the NBC broadcast crew prepared to compensate for the lack of announcers in several ways. NBC promoted the game by telling viewers they would, in lieu of announcers, have the experience of actually being in the stadium, so the network placed more microphones, and more sensitive microphones, around the field than it otherwise would have. However, the NFL refused to relax one of its restrictions and allow microphones to be placed on the players themselves, which meant that it was impossible for viewers to make out signals called by the quarterbacks.

If on Dec. 20, 1980, a Saturday, you tuned into NBC between 1 P.M. and 4:30 P.M., you witnessed something extraordinary: an end-of-season football game between the New York Jets and Miami Dolphins with no one describing it to you. There was, in fact, no intelligible talking at all, just crowd noise, the stadium public-address system and whatever grunts and pad smashings the field-side microphones could pick up—some three and one half hours of announcerless air, the one and only protracted blank in history's ongoing, chatter-filled recording of broadcast sports.

— The New York Times Magazine, 1990

The network increased its use of on-camera graphics during the game to regularly convey down and distance, score, and statistical information, to the point that there were more than had ever been used in any previous NFL telecast. The monochromatic yellow line that was superimposed on the field to indicate the distance needed for a first-down was then the most advanced technology available; however, speaking later from a 21st-century perspective, Ohlmeyer said seems like "troglodyte communication". The technology of the time would have allowed for a continuous score bug and a running clock, both of which would have eliminated the need to constantly provide that information, but it did not occur to the crew to deploy it that way. Conventional wisdom of the time, including at NBC, was that viewers would tune out if they turned to a game with a score bug and found that game was lopsided, and thus even when Fox introduced the score bug in 1994, NBC was hesitant to adopt it.

NBC asked Bob Kaufman, the Orange Bowl's public address announcer, to make more frequent announcements of information than usual, and to include more information in those announcements than stadium announcers typically did. Accordingly, he noted aloud during the game that referees were calling for a first-down measurement, and Kaufman gave the length of game time that a drive had taken. Television audiences were able to hear this.

Bryant Gumbel introduced the game prior to the kickoff as "a telecast that figures to be different." He was then shown walking into the stadium to watch the game. At frequent intervals, usually every other commercial break, he addressed the camera and gave the audience the score and brief updates as to what had happened and what was happening at that point. His presence was augmented by excerpts from prerecorded interviews with coaches and players, including the Dolphins' Don Shula and Duriel Harris.

== Reaction ==
As Ohlmeyer had hoped, the telecast drew higher ratings than it probably otherwise would have. "It was a dog of a game," he recalled to ESPN. "It did much better for us than [it should have]." Writing two days later, Chicago Tribune television columnist David Israel agreed: "People talked about a game they would otherwise have ignored." Of the approximately one thousand phone calls to the NBC switchboard, the network reported later, about 60% were supportive of the decision to go without announcers.

Gumbel discounts the importance of that reaction, noting that a thousand callers is not statistically significant when set against the U.S. population of 200 million at that time. "I thought it was more amusing than anything else," he said later. "I viewed it as kind of a stunt with a small 's'."

In retrospect, Ohlmeyer wished he had cut to Gumbel more frequently than he did. Michael Weisman, who co-produced the telecast, also felt the attempt to provide higher quality audio was unsuccessful. "There's all sorts of strange noises going on, buzzing and things that sound like a frying pan." The technical limitations of television broadcasts also, Israel observed, made it hard for viewers to realize that touchdowns had been scored on two short runs and Harris's catch, since officials were not within the frame.

== Legacy ==
Without announcers, David Israel concluded, "[t]his became a game with no context played by men with no pasts." Viewers had to know the backstory of the game themselves to appreciate the human drama on the field. Israel repeated Marshall McLuhan's observation that television conditions viewers to respond passively without engaging them, but: "here, out of the blue, it was asking us to participate actively, to provide input so that what was on the screen became more than just moving wallpaper. The viewers who were unable to do that were left watching padded humanoids clanking heads".

To Gumbel, one moment in the game makes this same point. At the end of the first half, the Jets decided to go for a touchdown and the lead they would never surrender instead of a tying field goal that Leahy would most certainly have made. "It lacks a degree of drama," he observes, "unless somebody is there to say, 'All right, here's why we're going to shut up and just watch this. Here's what's at stake.'"

Weisman came to the same conclusion in 2010, saying: "Early on in the game we realized that we could do whatever we wanted [...] We'd sit around in the truck and say, 'Let's play the tape now.' But it would just come out of the blue and didn't make a lot of sense out of context."

While he and his colleagues were relieved the experiment lasted no further than the one game, Dick Enberg says he did learn from the experience: "Consciously, to this day, there are moments in every sport that I do when I kind of throw up my hands as if to say to myself and to my partner, 'Let's not talk. This moment is special, we don't need to talk. Let's let it play.'"

Ohlmeyer says that despite a career in sports broadcasting that has involved three Olympic Games telecasts, 16 Emmy Awards and gotten him into the Sports Broadcasting Hall of Fame, the Announcerless Game is the one he will be most remembered for. "All the stuff I've done in my career, and that's what I'm going to be remembered for," he said three decades later. "It serves me right."

No other United States broadcaster has ever purposely replicated the experiment, with football or any of the other major team professional sports; the networks have produced announcerless broadcasts but only as an alternate feed (with the main network always carrying announcers). ESPN has regularly included announcerless broadcasts as part of its Full Circle and Megacast multi-channel broadcasts, usually on ESPN Classic; it has also offered (through its online ESPN3 feeds) skycam-centered telecasts without announcers and using only ambient audio on college football games. In select versions of the MLB.tv app, a 'ballpark sound' option is available on most games with only natural ballpark audio. In 2013, Fox Sports Detroit Plus offered its viewers a "Natural Sounds at Comerica Park" channel in which they could watch occasional Tigers baseball games with just the ambient sound from games at the team's home stadium, with information about the game coming via increased graphics as it did in the Announcerless Game. It was, however, offered only on a premier channel for those who paid the highest rates; the regular channel included the team's announcing duo of Mario Impemba and Rod Allen. The Alliance of American Football regularly offered live announcerless streams of its games, billed as "AAF Raw."

There has been one other instance in which a major league in North America used announcerless broadcasts. In 2005, when the Canadian Media Guild went on strike, CBC Television continued to carry its Canadian Football League broadcasts announcerless rather than bring in replacements. The strike ran from August 20 to October 4.

In 2022, over four decades after the Announcerless Game, NBC once again experimented with an announcerless game on July 3 in a game between the similarly struggling Kansas City Royals and Detroit Tigers as part of their MLB Sunday Leadoff package, with similar mixed feedback, but with more positive results. The closest any sport or any other entertainment organization had intentionally gone without announcers before this game was in professional wrestling. WWE has on occasions gone without announcers mostly for storyline purposes whether it be the announcers being attacked by wrestlers or (kayfabe) quitting. On one occasion, the September 10, 2012, episode of WWE Raw, WWE unexpectedly went the last hour of the broadcast without any commentary after color commentator Jerry Lawler suffered a (legitimate) heart attack live on-air, with no commentary the rest of the night except for play-by-play man Michael Cole to provide updates on Lawler before and after each commercial break and at the end of Raw.

Ira Boudway observed in Bloomberg Business:

The problem is that cutting the feed from the booth also means cutting down egos and cutting into advertising reach. If you're not hearing Tim McCarver recite the lyrics to Metallica's 'Enter Sandman', then you're not hearing Joe Buck tell you which beer brand is bringing you the game ... Going announcerless is akin to skipping commercials, and broadcasters and carriers are going to want to find a way to replace the lost revenue.

== See also ==
- 1980 in American television
- The "crowdless game", an 8–2 victory by the Baltimore Orioles over the Chicago White Sox on April 29, 2015, played without allowing fans to attend due to security concerns in the wake of civil unrest in Baltimore, the only such game in Major League Baseball history until the COVID-19 pandemic forced MLB to go without fans for the 2020 season.
- The Heidi Game, 1968 Jets game whose broadcast was cut short to show Heidi, resulting in changed procedure allowing games to be shown to conclusion
- History of the Miami Dolphins
- History of the National Football League
- History of the New York Jets
- Dolphins–Jets rivalry
- List of nicknamed NFL games and plays
