= Dolphins–Jets rivalry =

National Football League rivalry

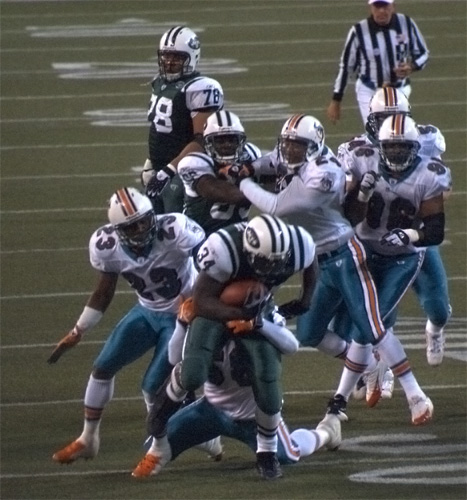
- Dolphins and Jets face off during the 2004 season.

- Miami Dolphins New York Jets
- Location: Miami, New York City
- First meeting: September 9, 1966; Jets 19, Dolphins 14
- Latest meeting: October 25, 2026; Dolphins 28, Jets 25
- Next meeting: November 29, 2026
- Stadiums: Dolphins: Hard Rock Stadium; Jets: MetLife Stadium

Statistics
- Total meetings: 122
- All-time series: Dolphins: 64–57–1
- Regular season series: Dolphins: 63–57–1
- Postseason results: Dolphins: 1–0
- Largest victory: Dolphins: 43–0 (1975); Jets: 41–14 (2004), 40–13 (2007)
- Most points scored: Dolphins: 52 (1995); Jets: 51 (1986)
- Longest win streak: Dolphins: 7 (1982–1984); Jets: 8 (1966–1969; 1998–2001)
- Current win streak: Dolphins: 3 (2025–present)

Post-season history
- 1982 AFC Championship: Dolphins won: 14–0

The Dolphins–Jets rivalry is a National Football League (NFL) rivalry between the Miami Dolphins and New York Jets.

The teams play in the AFC East division and play two scheduled games each season. They have often competed for divisional supremacy, and have played several classic games. The Dolphins are one of four NFL teams with a winning record against every division rival after 100 games played against each of them (along with the Dallas Cowboys, Green Bay Packers, and Kansas City Chiefs). Conversely, the Jets are one of only three NFL teams with a losing record against every division rival after 100 games played against each of them (along with the Detroit Lions and Los Angeles Chargers).

The Dolphins lead the overall series, 64–57–1. The two teams have met once in the playoffs, with the Dolphins winning in the 1982 AFC Championship.

== History ==
The Jets and Dolphins were established in 1960 and 1966 respectively; both as members of the American Football League. After the AFL–NFL merger in 1970, the Dolphins and the Jets were placed in the AFC East, guaranteeing that they would meet twice a year annually. The rivalry has stayed intense through the years as both teams are always competitive against one another regardless of the standings. The rivalry also maintains a high intensity because of the large number of transplanted New York Jets' fans who retire to South Florida.

Before the New England Patriots rise to dominance in the early 2000s, the Jets and Dolphins regularly contested for the AFC East title (along with the Buffalo Bills in the late 1980s and early 1990s). Upon the Dolphins' joining the AFL in 1966, the Jets laid the seeds for their 1968 Super Bowl III victory. After the Jets' Super Bowl victory in 1968, the Dolphins began ascending to the top of the NFL, culminating in back-to-back Super Bowl wins in 1972 and 1973. The 1972 season also saw Miami finish with a 17–0 record; the only NFL team to finish the regular season and post-season without a loss or tie.

=== 1966–1969: AFL Days ===
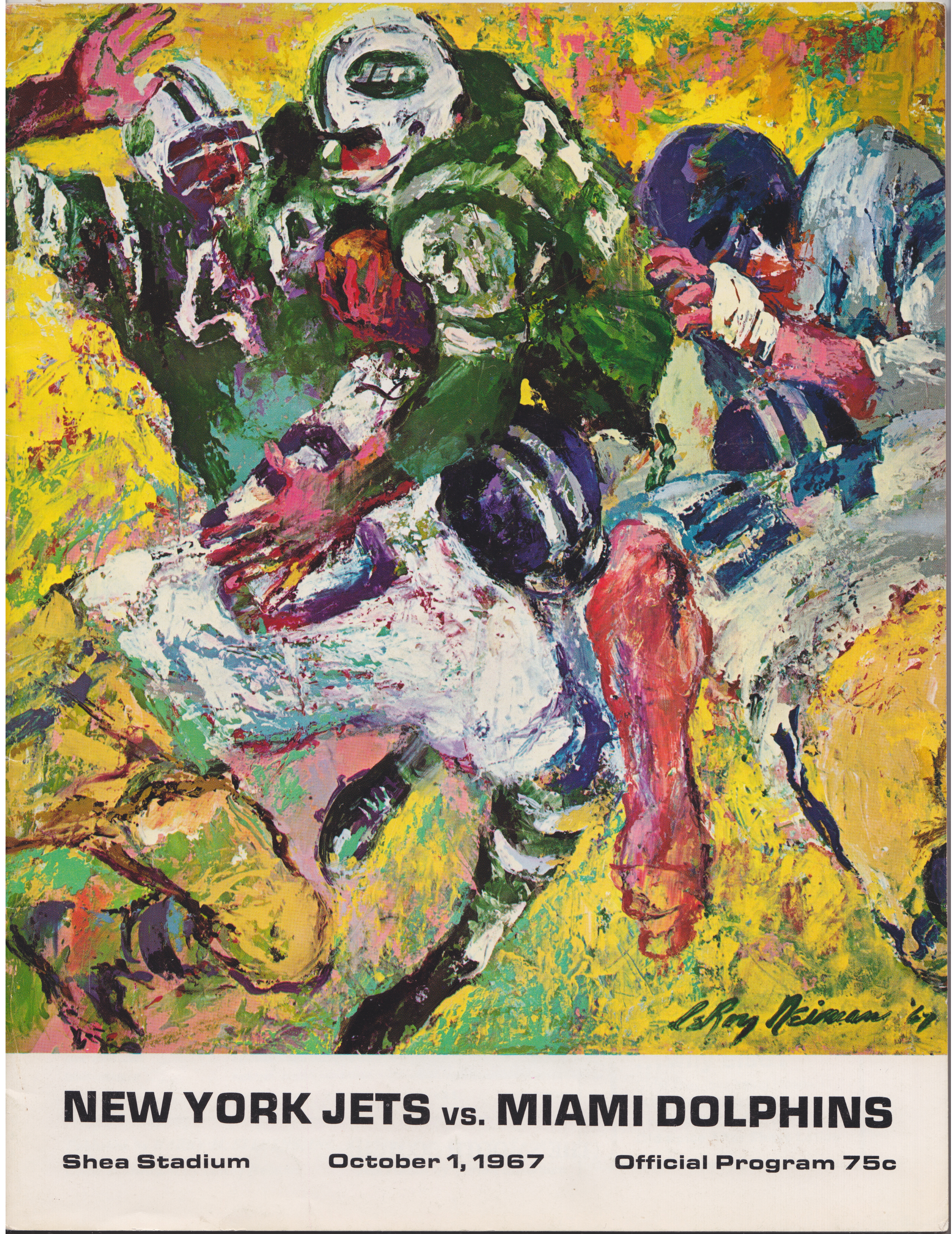
Program for a game in 1967.

When the Dolphins joined the AFL in 1966, the Jets were ascending the ranks of the AFL powerhouses on the arm of quarterback Joe Namath. The Jets won the first eight contests against the Dolphins beginning with the first meeting, a 19-14 Jets' win in Miami's second-ever game.

=== 1970–1977: Dolphins' dominance ===
When the Dolphins finally posted their first winning record in 1970, injuries plagued Namath and the Jets stumbled to a 4–10 record. Due to Namath's inability to consistently stay healthy, the Jets never posted a record above .500 in the 1970s (they finished 7–7 in 1972 and 1974, then 8–8 in 1978 and 1979). Meanwhile, the Dolphins quickly surged to become one of the NFL's elite after the AFL–NFL merger, peaking with the only undefeated season in NFL history (New England later had an undefeated regular season, but failed to win the Super Bowl) in 1972 and back-to-back Super Bowl wins in Super Bowls VII and VIII.

The Dolphins went 14–2 against the Jets during these seasons.

=== Late 1970s and 1980s ===
The 1978 season began a string of Jets' successes against the Dolphins in the early 1980s. Entering the 1980 season, the Dolphins were aiming toward another playoff run, while the Jets were struggling. The Jets won a total of only four games. Two of those games were wins over Miami: 17–14 in New York on October 27, and 24–17 in Miami on December 20 (a game whose telecast drew higher ratings than it might otherwise have when NBC decided to broadcast it without announcers as an experiment). Miami went on to finish with an 8–8 record, but it was the season sweep by the Jets that largely cost them their chances of a playoff berth.

The mid-1980s saw both teams become simultaneously competitive for the first time, beginning with a battle for the AFC East in 1981. That season also saw the only tie in the series, a 28–28 stalemate in Miami. The game lead tied or changed on every score; in the first half, Jet leads of 7–0 and 14–7 were answered by Miami touchdowns. Miami took a 21–14 lead in the third quarter but in the fourth, touchdowns by Wesley Walker and a Richard Todd pass to Bobby Jones offset a Don Strock touchdown to Nat Moore. In overtime neither team could advance the ball, ending the game deadlocked. Todd finished with 310 passing yards and four touchdowns to Strock's 279 yards and two scores.

The tie became crucial in the final standings; had the Jets won the game, combined with their 16–15 home victory during the season, they would have clinched the division on a tiebreaker. Instead, Miami won the division by one game. Still, the Jets' 10–5–1 record allowed them to clinch their first postseason berth in twelve seasons. But, they lost to the Bills in the Wild Card round, 31–27, while Miami lost a 41-38 overtime epic to the Chargers.

With the conclusion of the 1981 season, the Jets had won seven of the previous eight meetings with the Dolphins with the one tie. Miami, however, returned to the rivalry's fore in 1982, a season that saw the apex of the rivalry, coming in the 1982 AFC Championship on January 23, 1983, more appropriately known as "The Mud Bowl." After the Dolphins swept the Jets during the strike-shortened regular season (winning 45–28 in New York and 20–19 in Miami, the two teams met again, this time with a trip to Super Bowl XVII on the line. The tarp was left off the field of the Orange Bowl during a 72-hour rainstorm leading up to the game, which resulted in a sloppy field covered in mud which kept both teams scoreless in the first half. The game was a classic defensive battle that featured ten turnovers, eight of them on quarterback interceptions. The star of the game was Dolphins' linebacker A. J. Duhe who picked off Jets' quarterback Richard Todd three times, returning one 35 yards for a touchdown to help seal the 14–0 win and send the Dolphins to Super Bowl XVII. For the rest of his life, former Jet's coach Walt Michaels believed that Miami coach Don Shula ordered the tarp kept off the field, to neutralize New York's superior team speed.

In 1985 the Jets beat the Dolphins at Giants Stadium, 23–7, on Monday Night Football on October 14; three Jets' backs led by Freeman McNeil rushed for 245 yards; the win was the Jets' fifth straight after an opening-week shutout by the Raiders. On November 10, 1985, Mark "Super" Duper set a Dolphins' single-game record with 217 receiving yards and helped catapult Miami to victory. Down 17–14 with less than a minute to play, Dan Marino fired a 50-yard touchdown pass to Duper for the 21–17 win. It was Marino's third touchdown of the game and Duper's second.

Two of the most memorable contests between the teams occurred in 1986. On September 21, Jets' quarterback Ken O'Brien and Dolphins' quarterback Dan Marino put on a legendary offensive performance. The two quarterbacks, combined, set NFL single-game records of 884 net passing yards and ten touchdown passes, records which have since been broken. Dan Marino completed 30 of 50 passes for 448 yards and six touchdown passes. Mark Duper and Mark Clayton had big games, each having over 100 yards receiving (Duper with 154, Clayton with 174). O'Brien threw for 479 yards and four touchdown passes all to wide receiver Wesley Walker, including one with no time left on the clock to force overtime, and then the game clincher in overtime for the win, 51–45. To this day, it is the highest-scoring game between the teams (96 total points). The win propelled the Jets to a team-record nine-game winning streak, and an NFL-leading 10–1 record, when the teams met again on November 24 on Monday Night Football. However, Marino and the Dolphins got revenge with a blowout win at home. Dan Marino completed 29 of 36 passes for 288 yards and four touchdown passes, while Dolphins' running back Lorenzo Hampton rushed for 148 yards on 19 carries and two scores, one being a 50-yard touchdown run. As for the Jets, they could only manage three points, as the Dolphins defeated the Jets 45–3. The game also reflected a swift change in momentum for the Jets, who lost their final five games of 1986 to finish with a 10–6 record but managed to still back into a playoff berth. They eventually fell to the Cleveland Browns in a double-overtime divisional round loss.

Dan Marino made history in 1988; on October 23 he joined a very elite club, becoming one of the few quarterbacks in NFL history to throw for 500 yards, completing 35 of 60 passes for a career-high 521 yards. However, he also threw five interceptions; three of them were to rookie Jets' cornerback Erik McMillan, who returned one of them 55 yards for a touchdown. The Jets were ahead the entire game, including 30–10 at halftime, and despite a Dolphins' rally (scoring three touchdowns but missing the PAT on one of them), the Jets won 44–30. The game, however, was overshadowed in the Jets' locker room, for days earlier defensive end Mark Gastineau announced he was retiring from football to be with his girlfriend Brigitte Nielsen, who claimed to be suffering from cancer of the uterus.

In the rematch on November 27, the Dolphins fell behind 24–14 at the half but Marino (353 passing yards) exploded in the third quarter with two touchdowns to Mark Clayton (marred by a missed PAT) and an 80-yard score to Ferrell Edmunds for a 34–24 Miami lead. Pat Ryan had started the game for the Jets, throwing for 341 yards and two touchdowns, but in the fourth quarter Ken O'Brien came in and wiped out Miami's lead with scores to Mickey Shuler and Wesley Walker for a 38–34 Jets' win.

The two teams met in yet another high-scoring affair on September 24, 1989, in Miami. The Jets were looking for their first win at 0–2, while Miami was 1–1. Throwing for 427 yards and three touchdowns, Dan Marino raced the Dolphins to a 30–19 lead after three quarters. But again, Ken O'Brien whipped the Jets to rebound with two touchdown passes and a Johnny Hector rushing score in the fourth quarter for a Jets' 40–33 win. The Jets, however, lost five of their next six games when they hosted the 5–4 Dolphins on November 12. This time it was Marino leading a comeback; down 20–3 in the second quarter, Marino erupted with three touchdown passes while Sammie Smith added a two-yard rushing score and the Dolphins' defense limited the Jets to one fourth-quarter field goal and a 31–23 Miami win.

=== 1990s ===
The teams met in the season finale on December 22, 1991, a winner-take-all game for the final wild-card spot in the playoffs. It was a seesaw battle, and the Dolphins took the lead 20–17 with 44 seconds remaining. When the Jets got the ball back, they drove down the field and tied the game to force overtime on Raul Allegre's 44-yard field goal. Allegre came through for the Jets once again in OT with a 30-yard field goal, sending the Jets to the playoffs, and sending the Dolphins home.

In 1994, the Jets found themselves one game back of the Dolphins for the AFC East division lead heading into their November 27 match at the Meadowlands. In a game with first place on the line, the Jets held a 24–6 lead, outplaying the Dolphins for three quarters. However, Marino led the Dolphins back with two touchdowns, cutting the score to 24–21. Marino got the ball one last time and drove the Dolphins down the field to within the Jets' five-yard line. With thirty seconds left, and the clock continuing to wind down, Marino motioned that he was going to spike the ball to stop the clock and send out the field goal unit to tie the game. Instead, Marino took the snap from center and fired the ball in the corner of the end zone past Aaron Glenn to Mark Ingram. It was Ingram's fourth touchdown catch of the game, which tied a club record with former Dolphins wide receiver Paul Warfield. The touchdown gave the Dolphins a 28–24 victory, and Miami went on to win the division. This game is famous in NFL history known as "The Fake Spike Game" but the fake spike play itself is also known as the Clock Play. The Jets went into a spiral after that play, losing all of their remaining games. Indeed, the game marked the beginning of a period of ignominy for the Jets as they compiled a record of 4–33 from that game to the end of the 1996 season.

One of the more bitter losses for the Jets in 1996 was at Miami in Week 3. The Dolphins clawed to the Jets 5-yard line and tried for the touchdown on 4th and goal, but Aaron Glenn picked off the pass in the end zone and ran 100 yards for the touchdown. Later Neil O'Donnell connected with ex-Oiler Webster Slaughter on a 35-yard score, but after this score, Marino went 74 yards to Stanley Pritchett for the touchdown. After Karim Abdul-Jabbar tied the score the Dolphins took over, scoring two touchdowns marred by a missed Joe Nedney PAT and a botched 2-point try. The Jets despite being down 33–14 in the fourth kept fighting as Jeff Graham caught a long touchdown pass; later the Jets forced a Dolphins fumble but were pinned 4th and goal at the 29; O'Donnell threw deep and Keyshawn Johnson out-jumped the entire Dolphins defense to catch the touchdown. But the Dolphins iced it on a Nedney field goal for a 36–27 final. O'Donnell finished with 325 passing yards and three touchdowns.

After 1996, the Jets made several changes to turn things around, the most significant of which was the hiring of Bill Parcells from the Patriots. The turnaround was immediate; when the Jets hosted the Dolphins on October 12 they were 4–2 with the Dolphins 3–2. Marino led the Dolphins to a 31–20 win. On November 9 at Miami Glenn Foley had replaced starter Neil O'Donnell under center for New York; he threw for 322 yards, a touchdown, and a pick in a 24–17 Dolphins win. The two teams finished the season both 9–7 while New England won the division at 10–6; the Dolphins won the divisional tiebreaker being 4–4 in division games and the Jets 2–6 and thus earned the last wildcard playoff spot.

By 1998 the Jets were a serious division contender. Both teams were 9–4 on December 13, 1998, when they met on Sunday Night Football with the division lead, and possibly the division title, on the line. The Jets led 14-10 when Jets defender Chad Cascadden picked up a Marino fumble and returned it for a touchdown with just under two minutes to play to put the Jets ahead, 21–10. The Dolphins were able to score a quick touchdown to come close, but it was not enough, and the Jets won, 21–16, they went on to win their first post-merger division title the following Saturday at Buffalo. The Dolphins made the playoffs as the fourth seed and hosted the Bills in the Wildcard round; they defeated the Bills 24–17 before falling at Denver 38–3. The Jets defeated the AFC Central champion Jaguars, 34–24, but fell to Denver in the AFC Championship Game.

The team's 1999 season marked Marino's last against the Jets. On December 12 at Giants Stadium the 8–4 Dolphins fell to the 4–8 Jets, 28–20; Marino was intercepted twice and benched for Damon Huard. Two weeks later on December 27 the Dolphins, now 9–5, hosted the 6–8 Jets. The Dolphins were trying to clinch a playoff spot, while the Jets, who started their season 1–6, had won five out of their last seven. The Jets did not make it easy for the Dolphins. Lucas completed 11 of 23 passes for 190 yards and three touchdowns. Marino put on one of his last great performances, completing 29 of 52 passes for 322 yards and three touchdown passes, but also three interceptions. It was the last of Marino's NFL regular season record 63 career games with 300 yards passing. The Jets came away with a 38–31 victory, with two long Lucas touchdowns sealing the game. The Jets finished the season 8–8 (including a season sweep of Miami), while the Dolphins finished the season 9–7 and made it to the second round of the playoffs; after defeating the Seattle Seahawks, 20–17, they lost handily to the Jacksonville Jaguars, 62–7.

Marino retired six weeks later; he compiled a 17–13 record against the Jets and 72 touchdown throws, the most for Marino against any opponent.

=== 2000s ===
The Jets and Dolphins started the 2000 season 5–1 when they met on October 23, 2000, to determine control of the AFC East. What looked to be an exciting match between two of the top teams in the NFL at the time was anything but for the first three quarters. The Dolphins held 30–7 at the end of the third quarter. Vinny Testaverde threw three interceptions, running back Curtis Martin was limited to 30 yards on the ground, and the Jets offense could only manage two first downs in the first half. Meanwhile, running back Lamar Smith scored two touchdowns for the Dolphins on his way to 155 rushing yards for the night. However, the Jets came back in the fourth quarter with touchdowns from Testaverde to Laveranues Coles, Jermaine Wiggins, Wayne Chrebet and cut the lead to 30–20. After a field goal by John Hall, Testaverde fired a touchdown pass to Wayne Chrebet to tie the game at 30 with 3:55 left. It took only two plays for Miami to respond. Jay Fiedler threw a touchdown pass to Leslie Shepherd to retake the lead, 37–30. Testaverde drove the Jets downfield and, with 42 seconds left, found eligible offensive tackle Jumbo Elliott on a three-yard touchdown to tie the game at 37 and sent it to overtime. In the fourth quarter, Testaverde was 18 for 26 for 235 yards and four touchdowns, and the offense converted twenty first downs in the quarter, after managing just five beforehand. The Jets won in overtime, 40–37. The game came to be known as The Monday Night Miracle. When Monday Night Football celebrated its 500th telecast in 2002, fans picked the game as the greatest in the series' history. It was also the largest comeback from a fourth quarter deficit in NFL history. Despite the win, and a subsequent victory later in the season in Miami, the Jets failed to make the playoffs while the Dolphins won the division.

2002 was the tightest AFC East race in the division's history. Miami ended their losing streak to the Jets with a 30–3 rout at Miami on September 22; the next week the Jets finally benched Vinny Testaverde early in a loss to the Jaguars and Chad Pennington took over under center; when the Jets hosted Miami on November 10 Pennington led the Jets to a 13–10 win; Ray Lucas started for the Dolphins but a late rally failed. The Jets, Dolphins, and Patriots entered the final week of the season all with a chance to win the AFC East; the Dolphins had a 9–6 record, while the Patriots and Jets were 8–7. The Dolphins and Patriots met in Foxborough in what was essentially an elimination game, while the Jets played the Green Bay Packers later in the afternoon. The Dolphins simply needed to win the game to win the division, while the Jets needed a Patriots victory coupled with their own. The Patriots came back from an 11-point fourth-quarter deficit to force overtime and won on an Adam Vinatieri field goal. News of the Patriots' victory sent the crowd at the Meadowlands into celebration. The Jets, meanwhile, played a close first half with Green Bay before opening the game up in the second half for a 42–17 victory and the AFC East championship.

Both games in 2006 were tight contests that came down to the wire. The season was surprising for both teams; the Dolphins were considered a serious playoff contender in the preseason, but stumbled to a 6–10 record, while the Jets were considered to be in a rebuilding stage, yet managed to go 10–6 and reach the playoffs. On October 15, 2006, the Jets opened up a 20–3 lead with less than 13 minutes to play at home. Miami did not give up, though, as touchdowns by Chambers and Ronnie Brown cut the margin to three. The Dolphins got the ball one last time and got in field goal range for kicker Olindo Mare to attempt a 51-yard field goal with 33 seconds left to tie the game but it was wide right, preserving a 20–17 Jets win.

The teams met again on Christmas night that season. The Jets were 8–6 and in the position to clinch a playoff berth with victories in their final two games. A rainy field kept both offenses quiet for most of the night. All of the scoring happened in the final 17:25 of the game. Miami hit a game-tying field goal with 2:09 remaining to make the score 10–10. However, Chad Pennington threw a short pass to Leon Washington, which he turned into a 64-yard gain. Four plays later, Jets kicker Mike Nugent hit a 30-yard field goal with 10 seconds left to give the Jets a 13–10 win.

On August 7, 2008, the Jets acquired quarterback Brett Favre from the Packers. Favre's acquisition made Chad Pennington expendable, and he was subsequently released from the team. Pennington immediately signed with the Dolphins and became their starting quarterback. Favre made his debut for the Jets against Pennington and the Dolphins in Miami on September 7. Favre threw two touchdown passes for the Jets, while Pennington attempted to rally the Dolphins in the fourth quarter, reaching the Jets' red zone with under a minute to play, before throwing an interception in the end zone to end a 20–14 Jets win. The teams met again in the season finale at the Meadowlands with the division title at stake in what was essentially an elimination game. Pennington out-dueled Favre (who threw 3 costly interceptions) in leading his Dolphins to a 24–17 win and the team's first AFC East crown since 2000. The loss led the Jets to fire coach Eric Mangini.

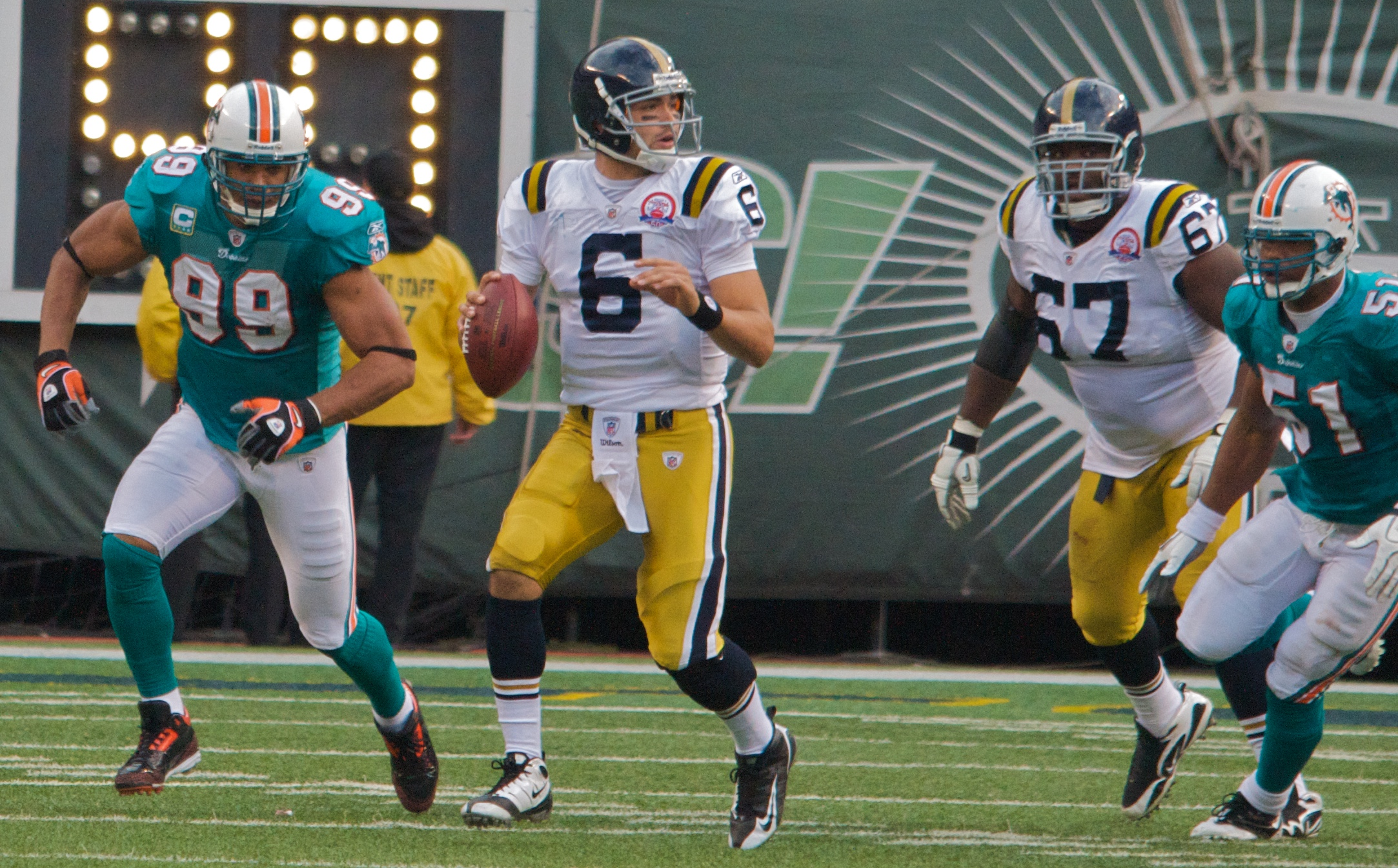
Jets quarterback Mark Sanchez (#6) under pressure from Dolphins defense in 2009

The Dolphins in 2009 authored their first sweep of the Jets since 2003, winning 31–27 in Miami and 30–25 in The Meadowlands; in the latter game Ted Ginn Jr., who had been demoted to special teams weeks earlier, ran back two kick-returns for touchdowns, accounting for 201 return yards. Both wins came with a reliance on the power-running Wildcat formation—notable because new Jets head coach Rex Ryan, who panned the formation in post-match interviews, then used the formation to re-ignite his team's playoff run.

=== 2010s ===
On April 20, 2010, longtime Dolphin Jason Taylor signed with the Jets. Taylor was known for making derogatory comments about the Jets during his tenure in Miami.

On December 12, 2010, strength and conditioning coach Sal Alosi was caught by CBS Sports cameras as he tripped Dolphins player Nolan Carroll as he ran along the sideline on a kick return. He was fined $25,000 by the Jets and suspended for the rest of the season; the suspension became indefinite after it was discovered that he had instructed inactive Jets players to line up along the sideline to potentially impede opposing players. Later on December 30, the Jets were fined $100,000 by the NFL for violating league rules in this incident.

In 2011, the Jets defeated the Dolphins on October 17 at the New Meadowlands, but a 19–17 loss in Miami in Week 17 left the Jets at 8–8 and out of the 2011 playoffs. The Week 17 game was notable for Miami as it was the last game for longtime Dolphin and ex-Jet Jason Taylor, and the 400th victory in Dolphins franchise history. An apparent Jets fumble in the final three minutes inside their own 20 was picked up by Taylor and run into the end zone but the score was called back.

Shortly after the 2011 season ended, the Jets hired former Dolphins head coach Tony Sparano as offensive coordinator who was fired during the 2011 season. In his first game against his former team on September 23, 2012, Sparano saw the Jets fall behind, 10–3, at the half before LaRon Landry intercepted Dolphins rookie Ryan Tannehill and scored in the third. The Jets raced to a 20–17 lead but the Dolphins tied the game on Dan Carpenter's 41-yard field goal. In overtime Carpenter missed a 48-yarder, then the Dolphins blocked a Nick Folk attempt, but the play was nullified when the Dolphins called timeout before the snap. Folk drilled a 33-yard field goal for the 23–20 Jets win.

On December 28, 2014, Jets quarterback Geno Smith posted a perfect passer rating en route to leading the Jets to a 37–24 win over the Dolphins.

After splitting the regular season series five consecutive seasons, the Jets swept the Dolphins in 2015. Following a 27–14 Jets win at Wembley Stadium in London, a Dolphins home game, the Dolphins fired head coach Joe Philbin and defensive coordinator Kevin Coyle. overseas. During the rematch, which the Jets won 38–20, the Dolphins managed only twelve rushing yards while New York's defense forced Ryan Tannehill into two fumbles.

The Dolphins got their season sweep over the Jets in 2016. They won 27–23 at Miami with the help of a 96-yard Kenyan Drake kick-return score in the fourth quarter. In the rematch, the Dolphins intercepted the Jets three times and got four touchdowns from quarterback Matt Moore, in a 34–13 win. The win helped Miami make the playoffs for the first time since 2008.

On November 3, 2019, former Dolphins coach Adam Gase faced his previous team as head coach of the Jets. Both teams were at that point at the bottom of the AFC in terms of win-loss records, with Miami entering the game at 0–7 and New York one game ahead at 1–6. Miami won this game to earn its first win of the year, thanks to three touchdown passes from former Jets quarterback Ryan Fitzpatrick.

=== 2020s ===
In 2020, the Dolphins lured former Jets offensive coordinator Chan Gailey out of retirement in the same position, which he previously served from 2000 to 2001 under then-Dolphins head coach Dave Wannstedt. Gailey would reunite with Dolphins quarterback Ryan Fitzpatrick, whom he previously coached in the Buffalo Bills from 2010 to 2012 as head coach and on the Jets from 2015 to 2016 as offensive coordinator. Like the 2015 Jets, the 2020 Dolphins finished 10–6 and were just one win short of a playoff berth. On January 6, 2021, Gailey announced his resignation from the Dolphins.

In 2021, the Dolphins completed their first sweep of the Jets in back-to-back seasons for the first time since 1996 and 1997. Both teams that season were led by young quarterbacks, in Tua Tagovailoa and Zach Wilson.

The rivalry intensified in 2022 when the Dolphins hired San Francisco 49ers offensive coordinator Mike McDaniel as their new head coach, and a year after the Jets hired another 49ers assistant coach, Robert Saleh as their new head coach a year earlier. McDaniel and Saleh previously served as assistant coaches for the Houston Texans from 2006 to 2008 and the Niners from 2017 to 2020. Both coaches, who served as the run game and defensive coordinators respectively, helped lead the Niners to Super Bowl LIV in 2020, in which they lost to the Kansas City Chiefs by a score of 20–31. In March, both teams were pursuing Tyreek Hill through a trade with the Chiefs. Kansas City accepted both trade packages but Hill chose Miami over New York. When asked about the Jets being a serious contender in acquiring him, Hill responded with "Who? The Jets? Nah man. I knew I was always going to pick Miami no matter what."

On November 24, 2023, the Jets hosted the Dolphins in the first game in NFL history played on the Friday after Thanksgiving. With two seconds remaining in the first half and the Jets trailing by four points, Jets quarterback Tim Boyle heaved a hail mary pass with the hopes of giving his team the lead before halftime. Instead, the pass was intercepted at the Miami one-yard line by Dolphins safety Jevon Holland, who returned the ball 99 yards for a touchdown that gave Miami an eleven-point lead. Miami would go on to win the game by a final score of 34-13 and thus deliver a crushing blow to the Jets' playoff hopes. The disastrous play known as the Hell Mary, immediately evoked memories for the Jets of the infamous Butt Fumble that occurred eleven years ago to the week, with the Amazon Prime game broadcast displaying a tweet from NFL Memes that said, "The Butt Fumble on Thanksgiving, The Hell Mary on Black Friday."

== Season-by-season results ==
Miami Dolphins vs. New York Jets Season-by-Season Results
1960s (Jets, 8–0)

| Season | Season series | at Miami Dolphins | at New York Jets | Overall series | Notes |
|---|---|---|---|---|---|
| 1966 | Jets 2–0 | Jets; 19–14 | Jets; 30–13 | Jets; 2–0 | Miami Dolphins join the American Football League (AFL) as an expansion team. They were placed in the AFL Eastern Division, resulting in two meetings annually with the Jets. In Miami, Jets hold the Dolphins to 111 total yards, setting a franchise record for their fewest yards allowed in a game (broken in 1970). |
| 1967 | Jets 2–0 | Jets; 33–14 | Jets; 29–7 | Jets; 4–0 | In New York, Jets' QB Joe Namath finished with 440 passing yards, setting a Jets franchise record for their most passing yards in a game (broken in 1972). |
| 1968 | Jets 2–0 | Jets; 31–7 | Jets; 35–17 | Jets; 6–0 | Jets win 1968 AFL championship and Super Bowl III. |
| 1969 | Jets 2–0 | Jets; 27–9 | Jets; 34–31 | Jets; 8–0 | Jets win eight straight meetings, finishing with a perfect record against the Dolphins in the AFL (1966–1969). |

1970s (Dolphins, 14–6)

| Season | Season series | at Miami Dolphins | at New York Jets | Overall series | Notes |
|---|---|---|---|---|---|
| 1970 | Dolphins 2–0 | Dolphins; 16–10 | Dolphins; 20–6 | Jets; 8–2 | As a result of the AFL–NFL merger, Dolphins and Jets are placed in the AFC East. Dolphins hire Don Shula as head coach. Dolphins record their first season series sweep against the Jets. |
| 1971 | Tie 1–1 | Jets; 14–10 | Dolphins; 30–14 | Jets; 9–3 | Following their home loss to the Jets, the Dolphins went on a 31-game home winning streak—an NFL record—that stood until it was broken in the 1975 season. Dolphins lose Super Bowl VI. |
| 1972 | Dolphins 2–0 | Dolphins; 28–24 | Dolphins; 27–17 | Jets; 9–5 | Dolphins win Super Bowl VII to complete the NFL's first 17–0 season. |
| 1973 | Dolphins 2–0 | Dolphins; 31–3 | Dolphins; 24–14 | Jets; 9–7 | Dolphins win Super Bowl VIII. |
| 1974 | Tie 1–1 | Dolphins; 21–17 | Jets; 17–14 | Jets; 10–8 | |
| 1975 | Dolphins 2–0 | Dolphins; 27–7 | Dolphins; 43–0 | Tie; 10–10 | In New York, Dolphins record their largest victory against the Jets with a 43–point differential. |
| 1976 | Dolphins 2–0 | Dolphins; 16–0 | Dolphins; 27–7 | Dolphins; 12–10 | |
| 1977 | Dolphins 2–0 | Dolphins; 21–17 | Dolphins; 14–10 | Dolphins; 14–10 | |
| 1978 | Jets 2–0 | Jets; 24–13 | Jets; 33–20 | Dolphins; 14–12 | |
| 1979 | Jets 2–0 | Jets; 27–24 | Jets; 33–27 | Tie; 14–14 | |

1980s (Dolphins, 11–9–1)

| Season | Season series | at Miami Dolphins | at New York Jets | Overall series | Notes |
|---|---|---|---|---|---|
| 1980 | Jets 2–0 | Jets; 24–17 | Jets; 17–14 | Jets; 16–14 | Game in Miami was the Announcerless game. |
| 1981 | Jets 1–0–1 | Tie; 28–28 (OT) | Jets; 16–15 | Jets; 17–14–1 | |
| 1982 | Dolphins 2–0 | Dolphins; 20–19 | Dolphins; 45–28 | Jets; 17–16–1 | Both meetings were played despite the 1982 NFL Players strike reducing the season to 9 games. |
| 1982 Playoffs | Dolphins 1–0 | Dolphins; 14–0 | | Tie; 17–17–1 | AFC Championship Game. Dolphins' LB AJ Duhe has three interceptions and returns one for a touchdown. Dolphins go on to lose Super Bowl XVII. |
| 1983 | Dolphins 2–0 | Dolphins; 34–14 | Dolphins; 32–14 | Dolphins; 19–17–1 | Dolphins draft QB Dan Marino. |
| 1984 | Dolphins 2–0 | Dolphins; 28–17 | Dolphins; 31–17 | Dolphins; 21–17–1 | Jets move to Giants Stadium. Dolphins lose Super Bowl XIX. |
| 1985 | Tie 1–1 | Dolphins; 21–17 | Jets; 23–7 | Dolphins; 22–18–1 | |
| 1986 | Tie 1–1 | Dolphins; 45–3 | Jets; 51–45 (OT) | Dolphins; 23–19–1 | In New York, Jets score their most points in a game against the Dolphins as Jets' QB Ken O'Brien and Dolphins' QB Dan Marino combined for 884 net passing yards and 10 touchdown passes. Jets finished with 581 total yards, tying their franchise record for most yards in a game (broken in 1988). |
| 1987 | Tie 1–1 | Dolphins; 37–28 | Jets; 37–31 (OT) | Dolphins; 24–20–1 | Dolphins open Joe Robbie Stadium (now known as Hard Rock Stadium). |
| 1988 | Jets 2–0 | Jets; 44–30 | Jets; 38–34 | Dolphins; 24–22–1 | In New York, Jets finish with 597 total yards, setting a franchise record for their most yards in a game. |
| 1989 | Tie 1–1 | Jets; 40–33 | Dolphins; 31–23 | Dolphins; 25–23–1 | In New York, Dolphins overcame a 20–3 deficit. |

1990s (Tie, 10–10)

| Season | Season series | at Miami Dolphins | at New York Jets | Overall series | Notes |
|---|---|---|---|---|---|
| 1990 | Dolphins 2–0 | Dolphins; 20–16 | Dolphins; 17–3 | Dolphins; 27–23–1 | |
| 1991 | Jets 2–0 | Jets; 23–20 (OT) | Jets; 41–23 | Dolphins; 27–25–1 | In Miami, Jets clinch a playoff berth and eliminate the Dolphins from playoff contention with their win. Both teams finished with 8–8 records, but the Jets clinched the final playoff berth based on their head-to-head sweep, eliminating the Dolphins from playoff contention. |
| 1992 | Tie 1–1 | Dolphins; 19–17 | Jets; 26–14 | Dolphins; 28–26–1 | |
| 1993 | Jets 2–0 | Jets; 24–14 | Jets; 27–10 | Tie; 28–28–1 | |
| 1994 | Dolphins 2–0 | Dolphins; 28–14 | Dolphins; 28–24 | Dolphins; 30–28–1 | In New York, Dolphins overcame a 24–6 third quarter deficit as Dolphins' QB Dan Marino's Clock Play scores the game-winning touchdown. |
| 1995 | Tie 1–1 | Dolphins; 52–14 | Jets; 17–16 | Dolphins; 31–29–1 | In Miami, Dolphins score their most points in a game against the Jets. Following their home win, the Jets went on a 13-game home losing streak Final season for Dolphins' head coach Don Shula. |
| 1996 | Dolphins 2–0 | Dolphins; 36–27 | Dolphins; 31–28 | Dolphins; 33–29–1 | |
| 1997 | Dolphins 2–0 | Dolphins; 24–17 | Dolphins; 31–20 | Dolphins; 35–29–1 | Both teams finished with 9–7 records, but the Dolphins clinched the final playoff berth based on their head-to-head sweep, eliminating the Jets from playoff contention. |
| 1998 | Jets 2–0 | Jets; 21–16 | Jets; 20–9 | Dolphins; 35–31–1 | |
| 1999 | Jets 2–0 | Jets; 38–31 | Jets; 28–20 | Dolphins; 35–33–1 | Final season for Dolphins' QB Dan Marino. |

2000s (Jets, 13–7)

| Season | Season series | at Miami Dolphins | at New York Jets | Overall series | Notes |
|---|---|---|---|---|---|
| 2000 | Jets 2–0 | Jets; 20–3 | Jets; 40–37 (OT) | Tie; 35–35–1 | In New York, Jets overcame a 30–7 fourth quarter deficit in a comeback that was nicknamed the Monday Night Miracle. The 23-point comeback marked the largest in Jets franchise history while the 23-point blown lead marked the largest in Dolphins franchise history. |
| 2001 | Jets 2–0 | Jets; 24–0 | Jets; 21–17 | Jets; 37–35–1 | In New York, Jets overcame a 17–0 deficit. Jets won eight straight meetings (1998–2001). |
| 2002 | Tie 1–1 | Dolphins; 30–3 | Jets; 13–10 | Jets; 38–36–1 | Both teams finish with 9–7 records, but the Jets clinch the AFC East based on a better division record. |
| 2003 | Dolphins 2–0 | Dolphins; 23–21 | Dolphins; 21–10 | Tie; 38–38–1 | |
| 2004 | Jets 2–0 | Jets; 17–9 | Jets; 41–14 | Jets; 40–38–1 | In New York, Jets record their largest victory against the Dolphins with a 27–point differential. |
| 2005 | Tie 1–1 | Dolphins; 24–20 | Jets; 17–7 | Jets; 41–39–1 | |
| 2006 | Jets 2–0 | Jets; 13–10 | Jets; 20–17 | Jets; 43–39–1 | Game in Miami was played on Christmas. |
| 2007 | Jets 2–0 | Jets; 40–13 | Jets; 31–28 | Jets; 45–39–1 | In Miami, Jets tied their largest victory against the Dolphins with a 27–point differential (2004). |
| 2008 | Tie 1–1 | Jets; 20–14 | Dolphins; 24–17 | Jets; 46–40–1 | Dolphins sign former Jets' QB Chad Pennington. Dolphins clinched the AFC East with their win. |
| 2009 | Dolphins 2–0 | Dolphins; 31–27 | Dolphins; 30–25 | Jets; 46–42–1 | In New York, Dolphins' WR Ted Ginn Jr. achieved two kickoff return touchdowns, each exceeding 100 yards. |

2010s (Dolphins, 11–9)

| Season | Season series | at Miami Dolphins | at New York Jets | Overall series | Notes |
|---|---|---|---|---|---|
| 2010 | Tie 1–1 | Jets; 31–23 | Dolphins; 10–6 | Jets; 47–43–1 | Jets open New Meadowlands Stadium (now known as MetLife Stadium). In New York, Jets' strength and conditioning coach Sal Alosi trips Dolphins' special teamer Nolan Carroll. |
| 2011 | Tie 1–1 | Dolphins; 19–17 | Jets; 24–6 | Jets; 48–44–1 | |
| 2012 | Tie 1–1 | Jets; 23–20 (OT) | Dolphins; 30–9 | Jets; 49–45–1 | |
| 2013 | Tie 1–1 | Jets; 20–7 | Dolphins; 23–3 | Jets; 50–46–1 | |
| 2014 | Tie 1–1 | Jets; 37–24 | Dolphins; 16–13 | Jets; 51–47–1 | |
| 2015 | Jets 2–0 | Jets; 27–14 | Jets; 38–20 | Jets; 53–47–1 | Dolphins' home game was played at Wembley Stadium in Wembley, London as part of the NFL International Series. In New York, Jets hold the Dolphins to 12 rushing yards, setting a franchise record for their fewest rushing yards allowed in a game (broken in 2016). As of November 19, 2026, this remains the Jets' most recent season series sweep against the Dolphins. |
| 2016 | Dolphins 2–0 | Dolphins; 27–23 | Dolphins; 34–13 | Jets; 53–49–1 | |
| 2017 | Tie 1–1 | Dolphins; 31–28 | Jets; 20–6 | Jets; 54–50–1 | In Miami, Dolphins overcame a 28–14 fourth quarter deficit. |
| 2018 | Dolphins 2–0 | Dolphins; 13–6 | Dolphins; 20–12 | Jets; 54–52–1 | |
| 2019 | Tie 1–1 | Dolphins; 26–18 | Jets; 22–21 | Jets; 55–53–1 | Jets hire former Dolphins' head coach Adam Gase as head coach. In New York, both teams combined for ten field goals, setting an NFL record. |

2020s (Dolphins, 11–2)

| Season | Season series | at Miami Dolphins | at New York Jets | Overall series | Notes |
|---|---|---|---|---|---|
| 2020 | Dolphins 2–0 | Dolphins; 24–0 | Dolphins; 20–3 | Tie; 55–55–1 | |
| 2021 | Dolphins 2–0 | Dolphins; 31–24 | Dolphins; 24–17 | Dolphins; 57–55–1 | |
| 2022 | Tie 1–1 | Dolphins; 11–6 | Jets; 40–17 | Dolphins; 58–56–1 | Dolphins' win, combined with the Bills' win against the Patriots, clinched them the final playoff berth. |
| 2023 | Dolphins 2–0 | Dolphins; 30–0 | Dolphins; 34–13 | Dolphins; 60–56–1 | Game in New York was the first NFL game played on Black Friday. |
| 2024 | Tie 1–1 | Dolphins; 32–26 (OT) | Jets; 32–20 | Dolphins; 61–57–1 | |
| 2025 | Dolphins 2–0 | Dolphins; 27–21 | Dolphins; 34–10 | Dolphins; 63–57–1 | Dolphins win 10 straight home meetings (2016–present). |
| 2026 | Dolphins 1–0 | November 29 | Dolphins; 28–25 | Dolphins; 64–57–1 | |

Summary of Results

| Season | Season series | at Miami Dolphins | at New York Jets | Notes |
|---|---|---|---|---|
| AFL regular season | Jets 8–0 | Jets 4–0 | Jets 4–0 | |
| NFL regular season | Dolphins 63–49–1 | Dolphins 34–21–1 | Dolphins 29–28 | |
| AFL and NFL Regular Season | Dolphins 63–57–1 | Dolphins 34–25–1 | Jets 32–29 | |
| NFL postseason | Dolphins 1–0 | Dolphins 1–0 | no games | AFC Championship: 1982 |
| Regular and postseason | Dolphins 64–57–1 | Dolphins 35–25–1 | Jets 32–29 | Jets are 1–0 at Wembley Stadium in Wembley, London (2015), accounted for as a Miami Dolphins home game. |

== Connections between the teams ==
=== Coaches/executives ===
| Name | Dolphins' tenure | Jets' tenure |
|---|---|---|
| Todd Bowles | 2008–2011, assistant head coach/secondary coach 2011, interim head coach | 2015–2018, head coach |
| Brian Daboll | 2011, offensive coordinator | 2007–2008, quarterbacks coach |
| Chan Gailey | 2000–2001, 2020, offensive coordinator | 2015–2016, offensive coordinator |
| Adam Gase | 2016–2018, head coach | 2019–2020, head coach |
| Bill Parcells | 2008–2010, executive vice president of football operations | 1997–1999, head coach |
| Dan Quinn | 2005–2006, defensive line coach | 2007–2008, defensive line coach |
| Tony Sparano | 2008–2011, head coach | 2012, offensive coordinator |
| Mike Tannenbaum | 2015–2018, executive vice president of football operations | 1997–1999, director of player contracts 2000, director of pro player development 2001–2005, assistant general manager and director of pro personnel 2006–2012, general manager |

=== Players ===
| Name | Position(s) | Dolphins' tenure | Jets' tenure |
|---|---|---|---|
| Yeremiah Bell | Safety | 2003–2011 | 2012 |
| Braxton Berrios | Wide receiver/Return specialist | 2023–2024 | 2019–2022 |
| Teddy Bridgewater | Quarterback | 2022 | 2018* |
| Elijah Campbell | Safety | 2021–2025 | 2020 |
| Bryan Cox | Linebacker | 1991–1995 | 1998–2000 |
| Ashtyn Davis | Safety | 2025 | 2020–2024 |
| Ryan Fitzpatrick | Quarterback | 2019–2020 | 2015–2016 |
| Clyde Gates | Wide receiver | 2011 | 2012–2013 |
| Nate Garner | Offensive tackle | 2008–2014 | 2008 |
| Frank Gore | Running back | 2018 | 2020 |
| Dustin Keller | Tight end | 2013* | 2008-2012 |
| Shaq Lawson | Defensive end | 2020 | 2021 |
| Brandon Marshall | Wide receiver | 2010–2011 | 2015–2016 |
| Rishard Matthews | Wide receiver | 2012–2015 | 2018 |
| Thomas Morstead | Punter | 2022 | 2021, 2023–2024 |
| Kevin O'Connell | Quarterback | 2011* | 2009–2010, 2011 |
| Spencer Paysinger | Linebacker | 2015–2016 | 2017* |
| Chad Pennington | Quarterback | 2008–2010 | 2000–2007 |
| Jason Taylor | Defensive end/Outside linebacker | 1997–2007, 2009, 2011 | 2010 |
| Jason Trusnik | Linebacker | 2011–2014 | 2007–2009 |
| Zach Wilson | Quarterback | 2025–present | 2021–2023 |
| Mike White | Quarterback | 2023–2024 | 2019–2022 |

*Offseason and/or practice squad member only

== In popular culture ==
In the Adam Sandler movie Little Nicky, Dolphins quarterback Dan Marino (appearing as himself) visits Hell and tries to plead with the Devil (Harvey Keitel) to give him a Super Bowl win in exchange for his soul (referencing Joe Namath's alleged "deal" prior to winning Super Bowl III for the Jets) but the Devil declines, saying that Marino is "too nice of a guy" and that Namath was "coming here anyways". After Marino leaves, the Devil reveals he is in fact a Jets fan.

== See also ==
- National Football League rivalries
- AFC East
- Heat–Knicks rivalry
