= Don Ohlmeyer =

American television producer (1945–2017)

- Born: Donald Winfred Ohlmeyer Jr. February 3, 1945; New Orleans, Louisiana, U.S.
- Died: September 10, 2017 (aged 72); Indian Wells, California, U.S.
- Education: University of Notre Dame
- Occupations: Entertainment executive, live broadcast director, liberal arts professor
- Spouse: Linda Johnson
- Children: 4

Donald Winfred Ohlmeyer Jr. (February 3, 1945 – September 10, 2017) was an American television producer and president of the NBC network's West Coast division. He fired Norm Macdonald from Saturday Night Live in early 1998, a move that is widely believed to have been motivated by Macdonald's refusal to stop making jokes at the expense of Ohlmeyer's friend, O. J. Simpson.

Ohlmeyer also directed the Olympics and other live sporting events while working for ABC and ESPN. He was a professor of television communications at Pepperdine University in Malibu, California.

== Early life ==
Born in New Orleans, Louisiana, Ohlmeyer grew up in the Chicago area. He attended Our Lady of Perpetual Help in Glenview, and Glenbrook North High School. He graduated from the University of Notre Dame in 1967.

== Career ==
=== ABC Sports ===
Ohlmeyer began his career with ABC Sports. A disciple of Roone Arledge, he worked on Wide World of Sports, was the first hired producer of Monday Night Football, brought Superstars to television, and also produced and directed three Olympics broadcasts (including the Munich Olympics).

=== NBC Sports ===
Ohlmeyer later moved to NBC as executive producer of the network's sports division, a position he held from 1977 to 1982. Over those five years, he created the popular sports anthology series SportsWorld and served as Executive Producer of NBC coverage of the Super Bowl and World Series. He also earned notoriety for the prime-time series Games People Play and the made-for-television movie The Golden Moment: An Olympic Love Story. Ohlmeyer became well known for expanding the network's sports coverage as well as introducing innovative production techniques. He launched NFL Updates, NCAA Basketball 'Whip-arounds,' and instituted NBC's live coverage of Breakfast at Wimbledon. Ohlmeyer is credited with conceiving the one-time experiment of airing a 1980 NFL telecast without announcers.

=== Ohlmeyer Communications Company ===
Ohlmeyer formed his own production company, Ohlmeyer Communications Company (OCC), in 1982. While there he produced several made-for-television movies, network series, and specials. He won an Emmy for Special Bulletin, a harrowing 1983 depiction of nuclear terrorism. His company was also responsible for producing CART IndyCar World Series race telecasts, and golf, including PGA Tour events, "The Skins Game", and Senior PGA TOUR broadcasts. While at OCC, Ohlmeyer also oversaw Nabisco's 20% stake in ESPN. Ohlmeyer also gained a 49% controlling interest in Hockey Night in Canada starting in 1986, taking over the Canadian Sports Network that ran the program under the MacLaren Advertising agency. He later sold his interest to Molstar Communications, the company which already possessed the other 51%.

=== Return to NBC ===
Ohlmeyer returned to NBC in 1993 to become president of its West Coast division at a time when the network was in third place in the ratings, following the conclusion of popular shows such as Cheers and The Cosby Show. During his tenure, NBC returned to first place with such hits as Seinfeld, Friends, ER, Homicide, Frasier, Providence, Will & Grace, and Late Night with Conan O'Brien. While Ohlmeyer was at the helm of the West Coast division of NBC, it was the only profitable national network in America. Ohlmeyer also spearheaded NBC's adoption of an aggressive promotional campaign to brand the network such as superimposing the Peacock logo in the corner of the screen and coining the phrase "Must See TV."

During the 1997 World Series, Ohlmeyer caused a stir when he publicly wished that the World Series would end in a four-game sweep so that its low ratings wouldn't derail NBC's primetime leading Thursday "Must See TV" entertainment schedule. The series went the full seven games.

==== Firing of Norm Macdonald ====
In early 1998, Ohlmeyer had Norm Macdonald fired from his role as anchor of Saturday Night Live's popular Weekend Update segment, claiming supposedly declining ratings and a drop-off in quality as the reason. It is widely speculated that the actual reason for the decision was retaliation for Macdonald's inclusion of a series of scathing jokes calling O. J. Simpson a murderer during and after his murder trial (1994–95). The jokes were written primarily by Macdonald and longtime SNL writer Jim Downey, who was fired from SNL outright at the same time (Downey was rehired in 2000, after Ohlmeyer left the network). Downey said later that Ohlmeyer and Simpson were good friends.

Shortly after Macdonald was taken off the Weekend Update desk, David Letterman (during a taping of the Late Show) called Ohlmeyer an "idiot" and made a reference to his alcoholism by labelling him "Happy Hour Don". Letterman later reconsidered and had the remarks removed for broadcast, but the comment was publicized shortly thereafter in a report in the New York Post. During subsequent televised interviews with Macdonald, Letterman stated that Ohlmeyer "fancies himself creative" and disparaged that notion, saying "Here's a guy who could not create gas after a bean dinner".

In an appearance on Live with Regis and Kathie Lee, Macdonald said, "Ohlmeyer is best friends with O.J. Simpson. If he can like O.J. Simpson, he can like me."

Ohlmeyer's animosity toward Macdonald continued when he caused NBC to block a promo spot for Macdonald's 1998 film Dirty Work from airing and would not allow the film studio to buy air time during other times to promote the film. Ohlmeyer said, "I just don't think it would be appropriate for us to turn around and take a check for a movie that's promoting somebody who has badmouthed Saturday Night Live and NBC." However, Ohlmeyer was later overruled by his bosses. One of them, Warren Littlefield, later wrote that "he made life a lot more difficult than it needed to be at NBC. Don was first a drunk bully and then a sober bully, but always a bully.”

In September 2021, following Macdonald's death, Late Night host Conan O'Brien revealed that Ohlmeyer had ordered him to stop booking Macdonald as a guest. O'Brien protested and ultimately won out, later booking him numerous times in the years that followed while he was at NBC.

=== Return to Monday Night Football ===
After his time at NBC, Ohlmeyer was lured out of retirement in 2000 to spark interest and provide some vigor to the MNF broadcast. Besides the on-air talent, Ohlmeyer's changes included clips of players introducing themselves, new graphics, use of a sideline Steadicam, and music. In another temporary change, the score bug used nicknames of teams, such as "Skins" and "Fins", instead of the teams' actual names or cities (the Washington Redskins and Miami Dolphins, in this instance). He also made the controversial decision to hire comedian Dennis Miller to join Al Michaels and Dan Fouts in the broadcast booth, an experiment since widely regarded as a failure.

Ohlmeyer left Monday Night Football after one season. Ratings for the program had dropped 7% compared to the previous year.

He later served as ombudsman for ESPN.com for 18 months between 2009 and 2011.

=== Death ===
After a month of poor health, Ohlmeyer died from cancer in Indian Wells, California, on September 10, 2017, at the age of 72.

== Personal life ==
In 1996, Ohlmeyer was admitted into rehab for alcohol abuse.

Jamie Tarses, an executive at NBC, had accused Ohlmeyer of sexual harassment. Both parties refused to talk about it on the record, and charges were dropped. Tarses was let out of her contract and became president at ABC.

== Awards and honors ==
Ohlmeyer was honored with 16 Emmys, including the Lifetime Achievement Award, two Peabody Awards, Cine Golden Eagle Award, Miami International Film Festival Award, National Film Board Award, Glaad Media Award, and three Humanitas Prizes. In 2007, he received the Lifetime Achievement in Sports Broadcasting award from the Academy of Television Arts & Sciences, and in 2008 was inducted into the Sports Broadcasting Hall of Fame.

=== Credits (partial) ===
==== Television series ====
- 1972–76 Monday Night Football (producer)
- 1980 Games People Play
- 1990 Lifestories (director/executive producer)
- 2000–01 Monday Night Football (executive producer)

==== Made-for-television movies ====
- 1980 The Golden Moment: An Olympic Love Story
- 1983 Special Bulletin (executive producer)
- 1986 Under Siege
- 1987 Right to Die
- 1989 Cold Sassy Tree (executive producer)
- 1991 The Heroes of Desert Storm (executive producer/director)
- 1992 Crazy in Love

==== Television specials ====
- 1972 XX Summer Olympic Games (director)
- 1976 XXI Summer Olympic Games (director)
- 1976 XII Winter Olympic Games (director)
- 1977 The 29th Annual Primetime Emmy Awards (producer)
- 1977 Us Against the World (also director)
- 1980 XXII Summer Olympic Games (executive producer)
- 1988 Crimes of the Century
- 1988 The 72nd Indianapolis 500 (director)
- 1989 Walt Disney World's 4th of July Spectacular (also director)
- 1990 Disney's Christmas on Ice

Business positions
Preceded by position established	President, West Coast NBC; 1993-1999	Succeeded by Scott Sassa
