= 1983 NCAA Men's Basketball All-Americans =

- Awarded for: 1982–83 NCAA Division I men's basketball season

The Consensus 1983 College Basketball All-American team, as determined by aggregating the results of four major All-American teams. To earn "consensus" status, a player must win honors from a majority of the following teams: the Associated Press, the USBWA, The United Press International and the National Association of Basketball Coaches.

== 1983 Consensus All-America team ==
Consensus First Team
Player	Position	Class	Team
Dale Ellis	F	Senior	Tennessee
Patrick Ewing	C	Sophomore	Georgetown
Michael Jordan	G	Sophomore	North Carolina
Keith Lee	F/C	Sophomore	Memphis State
Sam Perkins	F	Junior	North Carolina
Ralph Sampson	C	Senior	Virginia
Wayman Tisdale	F	Freshman	Oklahoma

Consensus Second Team
Player	Position	Class	Team
Clyde Drexler	G/F	Junior	Houston
Sidney Green	F/C	Senior	UNLV
John Paxson	G	Senior	Notre Dame
Steve Stipanovich	C	Senior	Missouri
Jon Sundvold	G	Senior	Missouri
Darrell Walker	G	Senior	Arkansas
Randy Wittman	F/G	Senior	Indiana

== Individual All-America teams ==
All-America Team
All-America Team	First team		Second team		Third team	
All-America Team	Player	School	Player	School	Player	School
Associated Press	Dale Ellis	Tennessee	Clyde Drexler	Houston	Antoine Carr	Wichita State
Associated Press	Patrick Ewing	Georgetown	Derek Harper	Illinois	Kenny Fields	UCLA
Associated Press	Michael Jordan	North Carolina	Keith Lee	Memphis State	Sam Perkins	North Carolina
Associated Press	Ralph Sampson	Virginia	Steve Stipanovich	Missouri	John Pinone	Villanova
Associated Press	Wayman Tisdale	Oklahoma	Darrell Walker	Arkansas	Ennis Whatley	Alabama
USBWA	Clyde Drexler	Houston	Dale Ellis	Tennessee	No third team	
USBWA	Michael Jordan	North Carolina	Patrick Ewing	Georgetown	No third team	
USBWA	Keith Lee	Memphis State	Sidney Green	UNLV	No third team	
USBWA	Sam Perkins	North Carolina	Ralph Sampson	Virginia	No third team	
USBWA	Randy Wittman	Indiana	Wayman Tisdale	Oklahoma	No third team	
NABC	Dale Ellis	Tennessee	Keith Lee	Memphis State	Sidney Green	UNLV
NABC	Patrick Ewing	Georgetown	Sam Perkins	North Carolina	Ted Kitchel	Indiana
NABC	Michael Jordan	North Carolina	Steve Stipanovich	Missouri	Jeff Malone	Mississippi State
NABC	John Paxson	Notre Dame	Jon Sundvold	Missouri	Wayman Tisdale	Oklahoma
NABC	Ralph Sampson	Virginia	Ennis Whatley	Alabama	Randy Wittman	Indiana
UPI	Michael Jordan	North Carolina	Dale Ellis	Tennessee	Clyde Drexler	Houston
UPI	Keith Lee	Memphis State	Patrick Ewing	Georgetown	Sidney Green	UNLV
UPI	John Paxson	Notre Dame	Jon Sundvold	Missouri	Chris Mullin	St. John's
UPI	Sam Perkins	North Carolina	Wayman Tisdale	Oklahoma	John Pinone	Villanova
UPI	Ralph Sampson	Virginia	Darrell Walker	Arkansas	Ennis Whatley	Alabama

AP Honorable Mention:

- Michael Adams, Boston College
- Billy Allen, Nevada
- Paul Anderson, Dartmouth
- Charles Barkley, Auburn
- Thurl Bailey, NC State
- Joe Binion, North Carolina A&T
- Charlie Bradley, South Florida
- Adrian Branch, Maryland
- Randy Breuer, Minnesota
- Darrell Browder, TCU
- Michael Brown, Penn
- Darren Burnett, Columbia
- Steve Burtt, Iona
- Michael Cage, San Diego State
- Tony Campbell, Ohio State
- Howard Carter, LSU
- Terry Catledge, South Alabama
- Roosevelt Chapman, Dayton
- Carlos Clark, Ole Miss
- Matt Clark, Oklahoma State
- Ben Coleman, Maryland
- Leroy Combs, Oklahoma State
- Tony Costner, Saint Joseph's
- Phil Cox, Vanderbilt
- Jeff Cross, Maine
- Russell Cross, Purdue
- Pete DeBisschop, Fairfield
- John Devereaux, Ohio
- Tim Dillon, Northern Illinois
- Robin Dixon, New Hampshire
- Calvin Duncan, VCU
- Devin Durrant, BYU
- Vern Fleming, Georgia
- Rod Foster, UCLA
- John Garris, Boston College
- Michael Gerren, South Alabama
- Franklin Giles, South Carolina St.
- Billy Goodwin, St. John's
- Greg Goorjian, Loyola Marymount
- Stewart Granger, Villanova
- Greg Grant, Utah State
- Butch Graves, Yale
- A.C. Green, Oregon State
- Glen Green, Murray State
- Sidney Green, UNLV
- Steve Harriel, Washington State
- Steve Harris, Tulsa
- Marvin Haynes, South Carolina St.
- Carl Henry, Kansas
- Jacque Hill, USC
- Roy Hinson, Rutgers
- Dave Hoppen, Nebraska
- Alfredrick Hughes, Loyola (IL)
- Jay Humphries, Colorado
- Mike Jackson, Wyoming
- Joe Jakubick, Akron
- David Jenkins, Bowling Green
- Dwight Jones, Cincinnati
- Greg Jones, West Virginia
- Keith Jones, Stanford
- Mark Jones, St. Bonaventure
- Brian Kellerman, Idaho
- Earl Kelley, Connecticut
- Harry Kelly, Texas Southern
- Ted Kitchel, Indiana
- Rick Lamb, Illinois State
- Mike Lang, Penn State
- David Little, Oklahoma
- Sidney Lowe, NC State
- Kenneth Lyons, North Texas State
- Jeff Malone, Mississippi State
- Pace Mannion, Utah
- Ray McCallum, Ball State
- Rodney McCray, Louisville
- Xavier McDaniel, Wichita State
- Chris McNealy, San Jose State
- Larry Micheaux, Houston
- Chris Mullin, St. John's
- Jay Murphy, Boston College
- Mark Nickens, American
- Akeem Olajuwon, Houston
- Horace Owens, Rhode Island
- Ernest Patterson, New Mexico St.
- John Paxson, Notre Dame
- Bernard Perry, Howard
- Mark Petteway, New Orleans
- Orlando Phillips, Pepperdine
- Ed Pinckney, Villanova
- Derrick Pope, Montana
- Mark Price, Georgia Tech
- Blair Rasmussen, Oregon
- Leo Rautins, Syracuse
- Glenn Rivers, Marquette
- Craig Robinson, Princeton
- Dan Ruland, James Madison
- David Russell, St. John's
- Erich Santifer, Syracuse
- Byron Scott, Arizona State
- Brad Sellers, Wisconsin
- Rick Simmons, Air Force
- Tony Simms, Boston University
- Charlie Sitton, Oregon State
- Jarvis Smith, Bethune-Cookman
- Steve Smith, Marist
- Barry Stevens, Iowa State
- Greg Stokes, Iowa
- Jon Sundvold, Missouri
- Dane Suttle, Pepperdine
- Peter Thibeaux, Saint Mary's
- Paul Thompson, Tulane
- Otis Thorpe, Providence
- Eric Turner, Michigan
- Melvin Turpin, Kentucky
- Clyde Vaughan, Pittsburgh
- Sam Vincent, Michigan State
- Byron Walker, UTEP
- Graylin Warner, Southwestern Louisiana
- Tony Webster, Hawaii
- Mark West, Old Dominion
- Mitchell Wiggins, Florida State
- Paul Williams, Arizona State
- Ronnie Williams, Florida
- Othell Wilson, Virginia
- Randy Wittman, Indiana
- Leon Wood, Cal State Fullerton
- Carlos Yates, George Mason
- Danny Young, Wake Forest
- Michael Young, Houston

== Academic All-Americans ==
On March 7, 1983 CoSIDA announced the 1983 Academic All-America team.

First Team
Player	School	Class
John Paxson	Notre Dame	Senior
John Pinone	Villanova	Senior
Steve Stipanovich	Missouri	Senior
Danny Tarkanian	UNLV	Junior
Randy Wittman	Indiana	Senior

Second Team
Player	School	Class
Devin Durrant	Brigham Young	Junior
Willie Hinz	McGill	Sophomore
Marc Marotta	Marquette	Junior
Steve Reid	Purdue	Redshirt Sophomore
Maurice Roulhac	Jacksonville	Senior

Third Team
Player	School	Class
Mitch Adamek	Toledo	Senior
Keith Cieplicki	William & Mary	Sophomore
Gordon Enderle	Princeton	Senior
Bryce PcPhee	Gonzaga	Junior
Mark Steele	Colorado State	Senior
