= 1984 United States men's Olympic basketball team =

- Head coach: Bob Knight
- Scoring leader: (United States) Michael Jordan 17.1
- Rebounding leader: (United States) Wayman Tisdale 5.9
- Assists leader: (United States) Leon Wood 7.9

The 1984 United States men's Olympic basketball team competed in the 1984 Summer Olympics in Los Angeles, representing the United States. The USA's senior men's team was led by coach Bob Knight, who was also the head coach of the Indiana Hoosiers at the time. The team won the tournament's championship. It was the last amateur-level U.S. team to win an Olympic championship in men's basketball. The team was considered to be one of the strongest in the U.S.A.'s history at that time, as it featured four of the five 1984 consensus first team All-Americans, in Michael Jordan, Patrick Ewing, Wayman Tisdale, and Sam Perkins.

Due to the 1984 Summer Olympic Games boycott, which was led by the Soviet Union and involved 14 Eastern Bloc countries and satellite states, the Soviet Union national team and the Hungarian national team withdrew from the tournament. However, the 1980 Summer Olympic Games gold medalists, Yugoslavia, defied the boycott to play at the tournament, and ultimately won the bronze medal.

== Roster ==
Name	Position	Height	Weight	Age	Home Town	Team/School
Steve Alford	Guard	6'1"	163	19	New Castle, Indiana	Indiana
Patrick Ewing	Center	7'0"	248	21	Cambridge, Massachusetts	Georgetown
Vern Fleming	Guard	6'5"	184	22	Queens, New York	Georgia
Michael Jordan	Guard	6'6"	199	21	Wilmington, North Carolina	North Carolina
Joe Kleine	Forward	6'11"	269	22	Slater, Missouri	Arkansas
Jon Koncak	Center	7'0"	250	21	Kansas City, Missouri	Southern Methodist
Chris Mullin	Guard	6'6"	211	20	Brooklyn, New York	St. John's
Sam Perkins	Forward	6'9"	233	23	Latham, New York	North Carolina
Alvin Robertson	Guard	6'4"	193	21	Barberton, Ohio	Arkansas
Wayman Tisdale	Forward	6'9"	259	20	Tulsa, Oklahoma	Oklahoma
Jeff Turner	Forward	6'9"	229	22	Brandon, Florida	Vanderbilt
Leon Wood	Guard	6'3"	190	22	Santa Monica, California	Cal State Fullerton

== Olympic trials ==
Trials for the team were held in April 1984 at Knight's regular base of operations at Indiana's campus in Bloomington. Seventy players attended the trials. Kentucky post players Sam Bowie and Melvin Turpin chose to skip the trials, in order to concentrate on the upcoming 1984 NBA draft, and Keith Lee of Memphis State, Len Bias of Maryland and Kenny Smith of North Carolina, ultimately pulled out as well. Knight led the trials with assistant coaches George Raveling, Don Donoher and C. M. Newton, whittling the prospects down to twenty, by the end of the first week of the trials.

During the trials, Auburn junior Charles Barkley impressed with his performance – most observers felt he and North Carolina shooting guard Michael Jordan were the two top performers. However, Barkley's and Knight's strong personalities did not mesh, and Barkley was one of the last cuts from the roster. Released along with Barkley, in the penultimate cut from 20 to 16 players in May, were John Stockton of Gonzaga, Terry Porter of Wisconsin-Stevens Point, and Maurice Martin of Saint Joseph's.

Knight's final cut to twelve players came in June, and the final four let go were Tim McCormick of Michigan, Lancaster Gordon of Louisville, Johnny Dawkins of Duke and Barkley's Auburn teammate Chuck Person (Dawkins and Person served as alternates for the team). The most controversial selection was Knight's own Indiana player, Steve Alford, who was the team's youngest member at 19 and not expected by most to make the team.

Prior to the Olympics, the team played eight games against NBA All-Star teams including Larry Bird, Magic Johnson, Kevin McHale, Robert Parish, Isiah Thomas and Mark Aguirre and won all eight. NBA players played in their offseason.

== Olympic tournament ==
The team went 8–0 in the Olympic tournament, averaging 95.4 points per game, and holding their opponents to 63.3. (Their closest contest was an 11-point win over West Germany in the quarterfinals; ironically, the Germans were only in Los Angeles as a replacement for the boycotting USSR.) Four players averaged double-figures in scoring: Michael Jordan (17.1), Chris Mullin (11.6), Patrick Ewing (11.0) and Steve Alford (10.3). Wayman Tisdale led the team in rebounding (5.9 per game), while Leon Wood led the team in assists (7.9 per game).

=== Results ===
- USA 97, China 49
- USA 89, Canada 68
- USA 104, Uruguay 68
- USA 120, France 62
- USA 101, Spain 68
- USA 78, Federal Republic of Germany 67; quarterfinals
- USA 78, Canada 59; semifinals
- USA 96, Spain 65; gold medal game

== Legacy ==
The 1984 Summer Olympics was a coming-out party for Michael Jordan, who led Team USA in scoring and dazzled the worldwide viewing audience with his athleticism and speed, including during the sweep of the NBA All-Stars before the Olympics. In addition to Jordan, the team featured two other future Hall of Fame members in Patrick Ewing and Chris Mullin (both of whom would later reunite with Jordan, as a part of the 1992 Dream Team). Jordan recalled that while this Olympic experience was exciting, it had also been demanding because of Knight: "I don't know if I would have done it if I knew what Knight was going to be like."

The Olympics and trials helped the draft stock of several players. Vern Fleming and Jeff Turner parlayed their Olympic exposure into first-round spots in the 1984 NBA draft, while several players who were cut from the team, either received strong recommendations from Knight (future Hall of Fame member John Stockton and Tim McCormick), or benefited from exposure from the trials (Charles Barkley and Lancaster Gordon).

== See also ==
- 1984 Summer Olympics
- Basketball at the 1984 Summer Olympics
- United States at the 1984 Summer Olympics
- United States men's national basketball team
