= 1984 NCAA Men's Basketball All-Americans =

- Awarded for: 1983–84 NCAA Division I men's basketball season

The Consensus 1984 College Basketball All-American team, as determined by aggregating the results of four major All-American teams. To earn "consensus" status, a player must win honors from a majority of the following teams: the Associated Press, the USBWA, The United Press International and the National Association of Basketball Coaches.

== 1984 Consensus All-America team ==
Consensus First Team
Player	Position	Class	Team
Patrick Ewing	C	Junior	Georgetown
Michael Jordan	G	Junior	North Carolina
Akeem Olajuwon	C	Junior	Houston
Sam Perkins	F	Senior	North Carolina
Wayman Tisdale	F	Sophomore	Oklahoma

Consensus Second Team
Player	Position	Class	Team
Michael Cage	F	Senior	San Diego State
Devin Durrant	F	Senior	Brigham Young
Keith Lee	F/C	Junior	Memphis State
Chris Mullin	F/G	Junior	St. John's
Melvin Turpin	C/F	Senior	Kentucky
Leon Wood	G	Senior	Cal State Fullerton

== Individual All-America teams ==
All-America Team
All-America Team	First team		Second team		Third team	
All-America Team	Player	School	Player	School	Player	School
Associated Press	Patrick Ewing	Georgetown	Sam Bowie	Kentucky	Lorenzo Charles	North Carolina State
Associated Press	Michael Jordan	North Carolina	Michael Cage	San Diego State	Keith Lee	Memphis State
Associated Press	Akeem Olajuwon	Houston	Devin Durrant	Brigham Young	Alvin Robertson	Arkansas
Associated Press	Sam Perkins	North Carolina	Chris Mullin	St. John's	Melvin Turpin	Kentucky
Associated Press	Wayman Tisdale	Oklahoma	Leon Wood	Cal State Fullerton	Michael Young	Houston
USBWA	Patrick Ewing	Georgetown	Devin Durrant	Brigham Young	No third team	
USBWA	Michael Jordan	North Carolina	Keith Lee	Memphis State	No third team	
USBWA	Akeem Olajuwon	Houston	Chris Mullin	St. John's	No third team	
USBWA	Sam Perkins	North Carolina	Melvin Turpin	Kentucky	No third team	
USBWA	Wayman Tisdale	Oklahoma	Leon Wood	Cal State Fullerton	No third team	
NABC	Patrick Ewing	Georgetown	Devin Durrant	Brigham Young	Charles Barkley	Auburn
NABC	Michael Jordan	North Carolina	Keith Lee	Memphis State	Vern Fleming	Georgia
NABC	Chris Mullin	St. John's	Sam Perkins	North Carolina	Charlie Sitton	Oregon State
NABC	Akeem Olajuwon	Houston	Melvin Turpin	Kentucky	Terence Stansbury	Temple
NABC	Wayman Tisdale	Oklahoma	Leon Wood	Cal State Fullerton	Michael Young	Houston
UPI	Patrick Ewing	Georgetown	Michael Cage	San Diego State	Bruce Douglas	Illinois
UPI	Michael Jordan	North Carolina	Keith Lee	Memphis State	Devin Durrant	Brigham Young
UPI	Chris Mullin	St. John's	Akeem Olajuwon	Houston	Mark Price	Georgia Tech
UPI	Sam Perkins	North Carolina	Alvin Robertson	Arkansas	Melvin Turpin	Kentucky
UPI	Wayman Tisdale	Oklahoma	Leon Wood	Cal State Fullerton	Michael Young	Houston

AP Honorable Mention:

- Mark Acres, Oral Roberts
- Richie Adams, UNLV
- Mark Alarie, Duke
- Steve Alford, Indiana
- Paul Anderson, Dartmouth
- Ron Anderson, Fresno State
- Victor Anger, Pepperdine
- Brett Applegate, BYU
- Charles Barkley, Auburn
- John Battle, Rutgers
- Chris Beasley, Arizona State
- Benoit Benjamin, Creighton
- Tommy Best, Saint Peter's
- Joe Binion, North Carolina A&T
- Cory Blackwell, Wisconsin
- Charlie Bradley, South Florida
- Adrian Branch, Maryland
- Mike Brown, George Washington
- Brian Burke, Dartmouth
- Steve Burtt, Iona
- Vernon Butler, Navy
- Tim Cain, Manhattan
- Tony Campbell, Ohio State
- Wayne Carlander, USC
- Joe Carrabino, Harvard
- Terry Catledge, South Alabama
- Roosevelt Chapman, Dayton
- Keith Cieplicki, William & Mary
- Steve Colter, New Mexico State
- Tyrone Corbin, DePaul
- Hank Cornley, Illinois State
- Tony Costner, Saint Joseph's
- Dell Curry, Virginia Tech
- John Devereaux, Ohio
- Tim Dillon, Northern Illinois
- Bruce Douglas, Illinois
- Joe Dumars, McNeese State
- Calvin Duncan, VCU
- Ken Epperson, Toledo
- LaVerne Evans, Marshall
- Kenny Fields, UCLA
- Vern Fleming, Georgia
- Jimmy Foster, South Carolina
- Derrick Gervin, UTSA
- Alton Lee Gipson, Florida State
- Marc Glass, Montana
- Carl Golston, Loyola–Chicago
- Keith Gray, Detroit
- Lancaster Gordon, Louisville
- Butch Graves, Yale
- A.C. Green, Oregon State
- Granger Hall, Temple
- Mark Halsel, Northeastern
- Terry Hairston, Houston Baptist
- Ron Harper, Miami (OH)
- Steve Harris, Tulsa
- Earl Harrison, Morehead State
- Carl Henry, Kansas
- Vince Hinchen, Boise State
- Dave Hoppen, Nebraska
- Alfredrick Hughes, Loyola–Chicago
- Jay Humphries, Colorado
- James Jackson, West Texas State
- Ralph Jackson, UCLA
- Joe Jakubick, Akron
- David Jenkins, Bowling Green
- Melvin Johnson, Charlotte
- Keith Jones, Stanford
- Harold Keeling, Santa Clara
- Steve Kite, Tennessee Tech
- Joe Kleine, Arkansas
- Jon Koncak, SMU
- Larry Krystkowiak, Montana
- Ralph Lewis, La Salle
- Karl Malone, Louisiana Tech
- Lenny Manning, Austin Peay
- Xavier McDaniel, Wichita State
- Ben McDonald, UC Irvine
- Forrest McKenzie, Loyola Marymount
- Tim McRoberts, Butler
- Kevin Mullin, Princeton
- Jay Murphy, Boston College
- Ronnie Murphy, Jacksonville
- Johnny Newman, Richmond
- Sam Norton, UT Arlington
- Kenny Patterson, DePaul
- Chuck Person, Auburn
- Paul Pickett, Saint Mary's
- John Price, Weber State
- Mark Price, Georgia Tech
- John Revelli, Stanford
- Jerry Reynolds, LSU
- Lamont Robinson, Lamar
- Ricky Ross, Tulsa
- Jim Rowinski, Purdue
- Bill Ryan, Princeton
- Detlef Schrempf, Washington
- Carey Scurry, Long Island
- Tom Sewell, Lamar
- Charlie Sitton, Oregon State
- George Singleton, Furman
- Lamont Sleets, Murray State
- Tom Sluby, Notre Dame
- Phil Smith, New Mexico
- Terence Stansbury, Temple
- Barry Stevens, Iowa State
- John Stockton, Gonzaga
- Bernard Thompson, Fresno State
- Otis Thorpe, Providence
- Regan Truesdale, The Citadel
- Jeff Turner, Vanderbilt
- Milt Wagner, Louisville
- Dwayne Washington, Syracuse
- Willie White, Chattanooga
- Mike Whitmarsh, San Diego
- Hot Rod Williams, Tulane
- Pete Williams, Arizona
- Kenny Wilson, Davidson
- Ricky Wilson, George Mason
- Efrem Winters, Illinois
- Randy Worster, Weber State
- Carlos Yates, George Mason

== Academic All-Americans ==
On March 3, 1984 CoSIDA announced the 1984 Academic All-America team, with UNLV senior Danny Tarkanian as the leading vote-getter.

First Team
Player	School	Class
Tim Dillon	Northern Illinois	Senior
Devin Durrant	Brigham Young	Senior
Terry Gannon	North Carolina State	Senior
Marc Marotta	Marquette	Senior
Danny Tarkanian	UNLV	Senior

Second Team
Player	School	Class
Paul Anderson	Dartmouth	Senior
Randy Kraayenbrink	Northern Iowa	Sophomore
John Matzke	Nebraska	Sophomore
Bryce PcPhee	Gonzaga	Junior
John Stockton	Gonzaga	Senior
