= Jim Master =

American former basketball player (born 1962)

Personal information
- Born: March 16, 1962 (age 64)
- Listed height: 6 ft 5 in (1.96 m)
- Listed weight: 170 lb (77 kg)

Career information
- High school: Paul Harding (Fort Wayne, Indiana)
- College: Kentucky (1980–1984)
- NBA draft: 1984: 6th round, 127th overall pick
- Drafted by: Atlanta Hawks
- Position: Shooting guard
- Number: 20

Career highlights
- Indiana Mr. Basketball (1980); Second-team Parade All-American (1980); McDonald's All-American (1980)
- Stats at Basketball Reference

Jim Master (born March 16, 1962) is an American former basketball player. He played collegiately for the Kentucky Wildcats.

== High school ==
Master's family moved to the Fort Wayne, Indiana community during his high school years, and he attended Paul Harding High School as a junior and senior and played for the Hawks.

During his junior year, Master led the Hawks to the school's first ever Indiana state tournament wins at the sectional and regional levels.

As a senior, Master set SAC records for most points scored in a season. His outstanding year was acknowledged when he was awarded the 1980 Indiana Mr. Basketball award.

His high school coach, Harlan Frick, is on record saying he believes Master is the finest shooting guard ever to play in Fort Wayne.

- High School Honors and Accomplishments
  - 1980 Indiana Mr. Basketball award
  - 1980 2nd team Parade All-American
  - 1980 McDonald's All-American

== College ==
Master attended the University of Kentucky on a basketball scholarship. He was part of the 1980 recruiting class that included Melvin Turpin, Bret Bearup, and Dickie Beal. This group was considered by PrepSports.com as the best recruiting class in the nation. It was also rated by one as the eighth-best Wildcat recruiting class of all time. Master was seen as the best outside shooter in the country. Besides Kentucky, Master was reported as being recruited by Notre Dame

During Master's freshman (1980/81) season, two players were named as all-SEC selections (a first-team and a third-team). The 1981/82 season ended with four players (including Master) named as all-SEC selections (a first-team, a second-team and two third-teams). The 1982/83 season ended with four players (including Master) named as all-SEC selections (a first-team and three third-teams). And the 1983/84 season ended with three players named as all-SEC selections (a first-team, a second-team and a third-teams).

Master and his Wildcat teammates were able to score many wins. The 1980/81 team finished the season 22-6 and ranked 8th best nationally in both the [AP] and [UPI] polls. The team played in the NCAA tournament as a No. 2 seed.

The 1981/82 team finished the season 22-8 and ranked 15th best nationally in the AP poll. The team was a SEC regular-season co-champion, and they played in the NCAA tournament as a No. 6 seed.

The 1982/83 team finished the season 23-8 and ranked 12th in the AP poll and 10th in the UPI version. The team was the SEC regular-season champion, and they reached the NCAA Regional Finals from a No. 3 seed.

The 1983/84 team finished the season 29-5 and ranked 3rd in both polls. The team was SEC regular-season and tournament champions, and they reached the NCAA Final Four from a No. 1 seed.

The talent on each of these Wildcat teams meant Master had a successful career that did not translate into lofty personal statistics. For his career, Master averaged 10.6 points, 2.10 assists, and 1.73 rebounds per game. But his value to the team was demonstrated by his playing time that averaged 28.7 minutes per game over his career and 31.4 minutes after his first year.

As testimony to his shooting ability, Master is currently 11th best all-time on the SEC record list for single-season free-throw shooting percentage (.896), and he is tied for 8th best all-time for career free-throw shooting percentage (.849) Those statistics rank Master 8th best and 4th best, respectively, all-time in Kentucky history.

- College Honors and Accomplishments
  - 1981/82 3rd team UPI All-SEC
  - 1982/83 3rd team AP, UPI All-SEC
  - 1982/83 All-NCAA Regional team
  - member of gold-medal team, 1983 Pan American Games

== Professional ==
Master was one of five Kentucky Wildcats to be drafted in the 1984 NBA draft. Melvin Turpin and Sam Bowie were 1st round selections and went on to play in the NBA for several seasons. Dickie Beal, Tom Heitz, and Master were drafted in later rounds, but none would play in a single NBA game.

== Post-career ==
Master now works as a financial advisor at Hilliard Lyons in Lexington, Kentucky. In 2013, he was inducted into the Indiana Basketball Hall of Fame. Master is also a part-time coach for the Sayre School men's basketball team in Lexington, Kentucky.
