= Tim McCormick =

American basketball player (born 1962)

Personal information
- Born: March 10, 1962 (age 64) Detroit, Michigan, U.S.
- Listed height: 6 ft 11 in (2.11 m)
- Listed weight: 240 lb (109 kg)

Career information
- High school: Clarkston (Clarkston, Michigan)
- College: Michigan (1980–1984)
- NBA draft: 1984: 1st round, 12th overall pick
- Drafted by: Cleveland Cavaliers
- Playing career: 1984–1992
- Position: Center
- Number: 40, 44

Career history
- 1984–1986: Seattle SuperSonics
- 1986–1988: Philadelphia 76ers
- 1988: New Jersey Nets
- 1988–1990: Houston Rockets
- 1990–1991: Atlanta Hawks
- 1991–1992: New York Knicks

Career highlights
- McDonald's All-American (1980); Second-team Parade All-American (1980)

Career NBA statistics
- Points: 4,030 (8.3 ppg)
- Rebounds: 2,366 (4.9 rpg)
- Assists: 491 (1.0 apg)
- Stats at NBA.com
- Stats at Basketball Reference

Timothy Daniel McCormick (born March 10, 1962) is an American former professional basketball player from Detroit who played eight seasons in the National Basketball Association (NBA). He currently is a pre- and post-game analyst for the Detroit Pistons. Tim McCormick also works as an analyst for College Basketball games on NBC Sports.

== College career ==
McCormick spent four years at the University of Michigan. He only played three seasons of college basketball due to missing his second season completely. In his last two seasons he posted solid averages of 12 points per game. As a senior in 1984, McCormick helped lead the Wolverines to the NIT title.

== Professional career ==
=== Seattle SuperSonics (1984–1986) ===
McCormick was drafted by the Cleveland Cavaliers with the 12th pick in the 1st round of the 1984 NBA draft. However the Cavaliers traded him and Cliff Robinson to the Washington Bullets for Melvin Turpin on the day he was drafted. The Bullets then traded him with Ricky Sobers to the Seattle SuperSonics for Gus Williams on the same day.

After being traded twice on the day of the draft, McCormick finally settled with the SuperSonics. He had a strong start to his NBA career, averaging 9.3 points per game in his rookie season. He spent two seasons with the team, however the SuperSonics struggled during this time and failed to make the playoffs during McCormick's time in Seattle.

=== Philadelphia 76ers (1986–1988) ===
McCormick was traded to the Philadelphia 76ers with Danny Vranes for Clemon Johnson and a 1989 1st round draft pick (Shawn Kemp was later selected) on September 29, 1986. McCormick boosted his scoring to 12.8 for his first season in Philadelphia. He also averaged a career high 7.5 rebounds per game for the 1986–1987 season. On November 21, 1986, McCormick set a career high 27 points in a loss to the Detroit Pistons. McCormick gained a lot of success for his first season in Philadelphia and the 76ers were not struggling. They finished 45–37 and made the playoffs, although they lost in the first round to the Milwaukee Bucks. McCormick played 23 more games for the 76ers in the following season however he left the team through that season.

=== New Jersey Nets (1988) ===
On January 16, 1988, McCormick was traded by the Philadelphia 76ers with Roy Hinson and a 1989 2nd round draft pick (Stanley Brundy was later selected) to the New Jersey Nets for Ben Coleman and Mike Gminski. McCormick averaged a career high 14.1 points per game during the remainder of the season in his time with the Nets. While McCormick statistically played a lot better in New Jersey, the Nets were a rebuilding team and posted a horrendous 19–63 record.

=== Houston Rockets (1988–1990) ===
On November 2, 1988, McCormick was traded by the New Jersey Nets with Tony Brown, Frank Johnson and Lorenzo Romar to the Houston Rockets for Joe Barry Carroll and Lester Conner. McCormick's production drastically decreased as his stats went downhill ever since the 1988 off season, however he sacrificed his stats to play on a playoff team as the Rockets finished the 1988–1989 season 45–37 and made the playoffs. The Rockets faced off against McCormick's former team, the Seattle SuperSonics, however the SuperSonics prevailed and defeated the Rockets in 4 games. In the following season the Rockets had a less successful campaign however they still managed to make the playoffs with a 41–41 record. As for McCormick, he only played 18 games and had an underwhelming season, averaging a career low 1.7 points per game. The Rockets still made the playoffs; they faced against the dominant Los Angeles Lakers, a team that was greatly feared by other teams during this era. The Rockets put up a strong fight but lost in 4 games once again.

=== Atlanta Hawks (1990–1991) ===
On September 27, 1990, McCormick was traded by the Houston Rockets with John Lucas and a 1994 1st round draft pick (Charlie Ward was later selected) to the Atlanta Hawks for Roy Marble and Kenny Smith. McCormick played better in the 1990–1991 season compared to his previous season, however at 28 years old he failed to return to his best level of play that was seen a few years prior. He still played a good part on the team and helped the Hawks reach the 1991 playoffs with a 43–39 record, however once again he couldn't make it past the first round as the Hawks were defeated by the Detroit Pistons in 5 games.

=== New York Knicks (1991–1992) ===
On October 3, 1991, McCormick was traded by the Atlanta Hawks with a 1994 1st round draft pick (Charlie Ward was later selected) to the New York Knicks for Maurice Cheeks. McCormick played 22 games for the Knicks. The team played well and finished 51–31 for the 1991–1992 season. The New York Knicks were the best statistical team that McCormick played for. In the 1992 playoffs McCormick was finally able to get out of the first round as the Knicks defeated the Detroit Pistons in 5 games. In the second round the Knicks faced a very difficult opponent, the Chicago Bulls who were led by the dominant Michael Jordan and were in the middle of their first 3-peat. Despite this, the Knicks played well against the Bulls and put up a strong fight. The series was close and went to 7 games, but the Bulls ultimately defeated the Knicks in game 7.

=== Retirement ===
At 29 years old, McCormick decided not to return to the NBA and retired shortly after. McCormick now works as a basketball analyst for the Detroit Pistons.

== Personal life ==
McCormick holds a bachelor's degree in communications from the University of Michigan. He has historically worked as a consultant with NBA players, teaching them strategies to improve their performance. He also runs the NBA Players Association's TOP 100 Basketball Camp for the top 100 high school players in the nation. He is the author of Never Be Average.

McCormick provides color analysis as a broadcaster for ESPN and NBCSN. He and his wife Michelle live in West Bloomfield, Michigan with their two children.

== Career statistics ==
Legend
GP	Games played	GS	Games started	MPG	Minutes per game
FG%	Field goal percentage	3P%	3-point field goal percentage	FT%	Free throw percentage
RPG	Rebounds per game	APG	Assists per game	SPG	Steals per game
BPG	Blocks per game	PPG	Points per game	**Bold**	Career high

=== NBA ===
==== Regular season ====
Year	Team	GP	GS	MPG	FG%	3P%	FT%	RPG	APG	SPG	BPG	PPG
1984–85	Seattle	78	27	20.3	.557	.000	.715	5.1	1.0	.2	.4	9.3
1985–86	Seattle	77	42	22.1	**.570**	**.500**	.713	5.2	1.1	.2	.4	8.8
1986–87	Philadelphia	**81**	**79**	**34.8**	.545	.000	.719	**7.5**	1.4	.4	**.8**	12.8
1987–88	Philadelphia	23	17	26.1	.514	–	.698	6.3	1.1	**.6**	.3	7.8
1987–88	New Jersey	47	38	32.2	.543	.000	.667	6.9	**2.0**	.4	.3	**14.1**
1988–89	Houston	**81**	0	15.5	.481	.000	.674	3.2	.7	.2	.3	5.2
1989–90	Houston	18	0	6.4	.345	–	.526	1.5	.2	.2	.1	1.7
1990–91	Atlanta	56	7	12.3	.497	.000	**.733**	2.9	.6	.2	.3	4.5
1991–92	New York	22	0	4.9	.424	–	.667	1.5	.4	.1	.0	1.9
Career		483	210	21.5	.535	.063	.703	4.9	1.0	.3	.4	8.3

==== Playoffs ====
Year	Team	GP	GS	MPG	FG%	3P%	FT%	RPG	APG	SPG	BPG	PPG
1987	Philadelphia	**5**	**5**	**24.2**	.500	–	**1.000**	**6.2**	**1.2**	.2	.4	**5.6**
1989	Houston	4	0	13.3	**.538**	.000	.889	3.3	.0	**.8**	**.5**	5.5
1990	Houston	3	0	7.0	.333	–	.500	2.7	.0	.0	.0	1.0
1991	ATlanta	2	0	6.5	.286	–	.667	1.0	.0	.0	.0	3.0
1992	New York	1	0	6.0	.000	–	–	3.0	.0	.0	.0	.0
Career		15	5	14.3	.449	.000	.833	3.8	.4	.3	.3	3.9
