= Roosevelt Chapman =

American basketball player

Personal information
- Born: April 6, 1962 (age 64) Brooklyn, New York, U.S.
- Listed height: 6 ft 4 in (1.93 m)
- Listed weight: 210 lb (95 kg)

Career information
- High school: Westinghouse (Brooklyn, New York)
- College: Dayton (1980–1984)
- NBA draft: 1984: 3rd round, 54th overall pick
- Drafted by: Kansas City Kings
- Position: Small forward
- Number: 22

Career history
- 1984–1985: Cincinnati Slammers

Career highlights
- 2× AP Honorable mention All-American (1983, 1984)
- Stats at Basketball Reference

Roosevelt "Velvet" Chapman (born April 6, 1962) is an American former college basketball player who, while attending the University of Dayton from 1980 to 1984, became the university's all-time leading scorer with 2,233 points. Through the 2023–24 season, it is a record that still remains unchallenged. Born in Brooklyn, New York, Chapman played basketball at Westinghouse High School.

== College career ==
As a freshman in 1980–81, Chapman averaged 12.8 point per game (ppg) and 5.8 rebounds per game (rpg) as the Flyers posted an 18–11 record and advanced to the second round of the National Invitation Tournament (NIT).

As a sophomore, Chapman increased those averages to 18.1 ppg and 8.0 rpg and was named the Flyers Most Valuable Player. The Flyers again earned an NIT berth and advanced to the third round, ending the season 23–9.

In 1982–83, his junior year, Chapman averaged 23.0 ppg and 9.6 rpg and was again Dayton's MVP. He also led the Flyers, who posted an 18–10 record, with a .562 field goal percentage.

As a senior in 1983–84, Chapman earned team MVP for the third time, averaging 21.8 ppg and 9.1 rpg. He became the all-time leading scorer in Flyers history, surpassing Don May's previous record of 1,980. Chapman eventually totaled 2,233 points and remains Dayton's top all-time scorer. He is eighth in career rebounds with 956.

Chapman led the Flyers to the 1984 West Regional final game of the 1984 NCAA tournament. The No. 10-seeded Flyers' unexpected run started in Salt Lake City, Utah with a 74–66 win over LSU. It was followed two days later with an 89–85 win over the Oklahoma that featured a career personal-best 41 points by Chapman. The next weekend, the Flyers defeated Washington 64–58 to advance to the Elite Eight. The Flyers eventually fell to eventual champion Georgetown, 61–49. The team's performance that year earned it the rank of No. 7 on Hall of Fame Magazine's list of "Cinderella Stories". Chapman scored 105 points in the four tournament games as the Flyers' season ended with a 23–11 record.

Chapman was referred to by Dayton students by his nickname, "Velvet", which is both a play on his first name and a description of his smooth playing style. He received a bachelor's degree from Dayton in 1990. In 1994, he was inducted into the University of Dayton Athletic Hall of Fame. He is the all-time leading scorer at the University of Dayton and also for being on the latter's basketball Hall of Fame.

== Professional career ==
Chapman was drafted in the third round of the 1984 NBA draft (54th pick overall) by the Kansas City Kings. He played the 1984–85 season for the Cincinnati Slammers of the Continental Basketball Association (CBA), averaging 12.5 points and 2.8 rebounds over 24 games.

== Post-playing career ==
Chapman later earned a master's degree in Educational Leadership through the University of Dayton. He lived in Dayton for many years and was a teacher at Arise Academy Charter High School. In March 2012 he returned to Dayton to film a series of promotional ads for the NCAA First Four, the first two games of the NCAA men's Division I basketball tournament held annually in Dayton. He later moved to South Dakota where he became a teacher and basketball coach at the Crazy Horse School on the Pine Ridge Indian Reservation.
