= George Westinghouse Career and Technical Education High School =

Public school in New York City

Coordinates: 40°41′43.6″N 73°59′9.6″W

George Westinghouse Career and Technical Education High School is a vocational high school in Downtown Brooklyn, New York, United States. It is located at 105 Tech Place, south of Tillary Street and east of Jay Street. It is named after the electrical pioneer George Westinghouse Jr.

The school was one of a number of New York City public schools that dropped Native American-themed sports team names.

== Notable alumni ==
- Joe Pignatano, MLB catcher
- Larry McNeill, NBA player
- Roosevelt Chapman, basketball player and University of Dayton standout
- Michael K. Williams, actor
- Jay-Z, real name Shawn Carter, rapper
- Busta Rhymes, real name Trevor Smith, Jr., rapper
- The Notorious B.I.G., real name Christopher Wallace, rapper
- Oliver "Power" Grant, entrepreneur, producer, actor and close Wu-Tang Clan associate
- Theophilus London, rapper and singer
