= Eric Turner (basketball) =

American basketball player

Personal information
- Born: February 7, 1963 (age 63) Elkhart, Indiana, U.S.
- Listed height: 6 ft 3 in (1.91 m)
- Listed weight: 180 lb (82 kg)

Career information
- High school: Flint Central (Flint, Michigan)
- College: Michigan (1981–1984)
- NBA draft: 1984: 2nd round, 32nd overall pick
- Drafted by: Detroit Pistons
- Playing career: 1984–1989
- Position: Point guard
- Number: 12, 25

Career history
- 1984–1986: Detroit Spirits
- 1986: Staten Island Stallions
- 1986: Great Taste Coffee Makers
- 1988–1989: La Crosse Catbirds

Career highlights
- CBA Rookie of the Year (1985); Second-team Parade All-American (1981); McDonald's All-American (1981)
- Stats at Basketball Reference

Eric Clifton Turner (born February 7, 1963) is an American former professional basketball player. He played college basketball for the Michigan Wolverines.

== Career ==
A 6 ft 3 in (1.91 m) playmaker out of the University of Michigan, Turner averaged 14.7 points, 2.5 rebounds and 5.0 assists in 85 games from 1981–82 through 1983–84 and was a three-year starter. He was chosen by the Detroit Pistons on the second round of the 1984 NBA draft as a junior eligible. Turner was a member of the USA team that won the bronze medal in the 1983 World University games in Edmonton, Alberta, Canada.

Turner has never played in the NBA but played with the CBA's Detroit Spirits in 1984–85 and 1985–86 and unsuccessfully tried out with the Houston Rockets in the summer of 1985. In 1984–85, Turner was voted the CBA's Rookie of the year after ranking second in the league in assists and contributing 17.5 points per game in 47 outings. He also suited up for the Staten Island Stallions in the United States Basketball League (USBL) season.
