= Steve Colter =

American basketball player

Personal information
- Born: July 24, 1962 (age 64) Phoenix, Arizona, U.S.
- Listed height: 6 ft 3 in (1.91 m)
- Listed weight: 165 lb (75 kg)

Career information
- High school: Phoenix Union (Phoenix, Arizona)
- College: New Mexico State (1980–1984)
- NBA draft: 1984: 2nd round, 33rd overall pick
- Drafted by: Portland Trail Blazers
- Playing career: 1984–1995
- Position: Point guard
- Number: 20, 22, 14, 21, 5

Career history
- 1984–1986: Portland Trail Blazers
- 1986: Chicago Bulls
- 1986–1987: Philadelphia 76ers
- 1987–1990: Washington Bullets
- 1990–1991: Sacramento Kings
- 1991–1993: Omaha Racers
- 1992: Shell Rimula X
- 1993–1994: KK Split
- 1994–1995: Cleveland Cavaliers

Career highlights
- CBA champion (1993); First-team All-PCAA (1984)
- Stats at NBA.com
- Stats at Basketball Reference

Steve Colter (born July 24, 1962) is an American former professional basketball player who played in eight National Basketball Association (NBA) seasons for six different teams. He played for the Portland Trail Blazers, Chicago Bulls, Philadelphia 76ers, Washington Bullets, Sacramento Kings and Cleveland Cavaliers. A 6'3" guard from New Mexico State, he was selected by the Portland Trail Blazers in the second round (33rd overall) of the 1984 NBA draft.

In his NBA career, Colter played in 526 games and scored a total of 3,319 points. His best year as a professional came during the 1985–86 season as a member of the Trail Blazers, appearing in 81 games (51 starts) and averaging 8.7 points per game. From 1991 until 1994 he did not play in the NBA, but returned to play for the Cleveland Cavaliers for one more season before retiring in 1995. He also became an import in the Philippine Basketball Association played with the Shell Rimula X in 1992.

Colter won a Continental Basketball Association (CBA) championship with the Omaha Racers in 1993.

== Career statistics ==
Legend
GP	Games played	GS	Games started	MPG	Minutes per game
FG%	Field goal percentage	3P%	3-point field goal percentage	FT%	Free throw percentage
RPG	Rebounds per game	APG	Assists per game	SPG	Steals per game
BPG	Blocks per game	PPG	Points per game	**Bold**	Career high

=== NBA ===
==== Regular season ====
Year	Team	GP	GS	MPG	FG%	3P%	FT%	RPG	APG	SPG	BPG	PPG
1984–85	Portland	78	22	18.7	.453	.351	.754	1.9	3.1	1.0	.1	7.1
1985–86	Portland	**81**	51	23.1	.456	.325	.823	2.2	3.2	**1.4**	.1	**8.7**
1986–87	Chicago	27	18	17.5	.345	.000	**.846**	1.6	3.5	.7	.2	4.9
1986–87	Philadelphia	43	13	19.7	.471	**.500**	.721	1.5	2.7	.9	.1	6.8
1987–88	Philadelphia	12	0	12.7	.375	–	.778	1.5	2.2	.5	.0	3.1
1987–88	Washington	56	**53**	**24.3**	.469	.300	.791	**2.8**	**4.2**	1.0	**.3**	8.0
1988–89	Washington	80	5	17.8	.444	.140	.749	2.3	2.8	.9	.2	6.7
1989–90	Washington	73	1	13.4	**.478**	.000	.811	2.4	2.0	.6	.1	4.9
1990–91	Sacramento	19	0	13.2	.411	.357	.700	1.4	1.9	.6	.1	3.1
1994–95	Cleveland	57	7	13.2	.396	.229	.761	1.0	1.8	.5	.1	3.4
Career		526	170	18.2	.448	.289	.778	2.0	2.8	.9	.1	6.3

==== Playoffs ====
Year	Team	GP	GS	MPG	FG%	3P%	FT%	RPG	APG	SPG	BPG	PPG
1985	Portland	**9**	0	18.4	.480	**.273**	.625	1.8	4.1	.6	.0	**8.9**
1986	Portland	4	4	**26.0**	.462	.000	**1.000**	**3.8**	**5.3**	**1.3**	.3	6.5
1987	Philadelphia	2	0	4.0	**.500**	–	–	.0	1.0	.0	.0	1.0
1988	Washington	5	**5**	17.2	.452	–	.571	3.0	2.6	.6	**.6**	6.4
1995	Cleveland	4	0	10.8	**.500**	.000	.500	.3	.5	.3	.0	3.0
Career		24	9	17.0	.472	.231	.619	2.0	3.2	.6	.2	6.3
