= Ralph Jackson (basketball) =

American basketball player (born 1962)

Personal information
- Born: October 26, 1962 (age 64) Los Angeles, California, U.S.
- Listed height: 6 ft 2 in (1.88 m)
- Listed weight: 190 lb (86 kg)

Career information
- High school: Inglewood (Inglewood, California)
- College: UCLA (1980–1984)
- NBA draft: 1984: 4th round, 71st overall pick
- Drafted by: Indiana Pacers
- Playing career: 1984–1986
- Position: Point guard
- Number: 2

Career history
- 1984: Indiana Pacers
- 1984–1986: Toronto/Pensacola Tornados

Career highlights
- First-team All-Pac-10 (1984); California Mr. Basketball (1980); First-team Parade All-American (1980); McDonald's All-American (1980)
- Stats at NBA.com
- Stats at Basketball Reference

Ralph A. Jackson III (born October 26, 1962) is an American former professional basketball player who played briefly in the National Basketball Association (NBA).

== Early life ==
Jackson attended Inglewood High School in Inglewood, California. The school's basketball team was the nation's top-ranked team in 1980, going undefeated and winning the national championship, with Jackson the CIF player of the year and all-time assists leader. At UCLA, Jackson averaged 8.4 points, 4.7 assists, 2.6 rebounds and 1.3 steals in 111 career games between 1980 and 1984.

== Career ==
Jackson was selected by the Indiana Pacers in the fourth round of the 1984 NBA draft with the 71st overall pick. He signed with the Pacers on September 1, 1984, and played his one and only NBA game on November 7 against the Philadelphia 76ers. He was waived by the Pacers on November 9. On November 20, he was acquired by the Toronto Tornados of the Continental Basketball Association. He averaged 8.3 points, 4.0 assists, 2.7 rebounds and 1.6 steals in 47 games for the Tornados during the 1984–85 season. He returned to the franchise in 1985–86, with the team moving to Florida mid-season and becoming the Pensacola Tornados. In 14 games, he averaged 7.6 points, 4.1 assists and 2.1 rebounds per game.

== Career statistics ==
Legend
GP	Games played	GS	Games started	MPG	Minutes per game
FG%	Field goal percentage	3P%	3-point field goal percentage	FT%	Free throw percentage
RPG	Rebounds per game	APG	Assists per game	SPG	Steals per game
BPG	Blocks per game	PPG	Points per game	**Bold**	Career high

=== NBA ===
==== Regular season ====
Year	Team	GP	GS	MPG	FG%	3P%	FT%	RPG	APG	SPG	BPG	PPG
1984–85	Indiana	1	0	12.0	.333	–	–	1.0	4.0	2.0	.0	2.0
