= 1984 NBA draft =

Basketball player selection

General information
- Sport: Basketball
- Date: June 19, 1984
- Location: Felt Forum, Madison Square Garden (New York City, New York)
- Network: USA Network

Overview
- 228 total selections in 10 rounds
- League: NBA
- First selection: Akeem Olajuwon (Houston Rockets)
- Hall of Famers: 5: C Akeem Olajuwon; G Michael Jordan; F Charles Barkley; G John Stockton; G Oscar Schmidt

The 1984 NBA draft was the 37th annual draft of the National Basketball Association (NBA). It was held at the Felt Forum at Madison Square Garden in New York City, New York, on June 19, 1984, before the 1984–85 season. The draft is generally considered to be one of the greatest, if not the greatest, in NBA history, with four players who would go on to be Hall of Famers being drafted in the first sixteen picks and five overall. It included first pick Akeem Olajuwon, Michael Jordan, Charles Barkley, and John Stockton. The draft was broadcast in the United States on the USA Network. This draft would be the last NBA draft to be aired nationally on the USA Network; starting with the 1985 NBA draft year, the NBA would have increased national coverage by first airing the event on TBS and then on TNT before airing the event on ESPN as of 2003.

In this draft, 23 NBA teams took turns selecting amateur U.S. college basketball players and other eligible players, including international players. The Houston Rockets won the coin flip and were awarded the first overall pick, while the Portland Trail Blazers, who obtained the Indiana Pacers' first-round pick in a trade, were awarded the second pick. The remaining first-round picks and the subsequent rounds were assigned to teams in reverse order of their win–loss record in the previous season. The Cleveland Cavaliers were awarded an extra first-round draft pick as compensation for the draft picks traded away by their previous owner, Ted Stepien.

A player who had finished his four-year college eligibility was automatically eligible for selection. Before the draft, five college underclassmen announced that they would leave college early and would be eligible for selection. Prior to the draft, the San Diego Clippers relocated to Los Angeles and became the Los Angeles Clippers. The draft consisted of 10 rounds comprising the selection of 228 players. This draft was the last to be held before the creation of the draft lottery in 1985. It was the first NBA draft to be overseen by David Stern, who continued as the commissioner of the league for the following 30 years.

This is the most recent draft to feature two rookies to play in the All-Star Game, with Jordan and Olajuwon both selected in the 1985 game.

== Draft selections ==
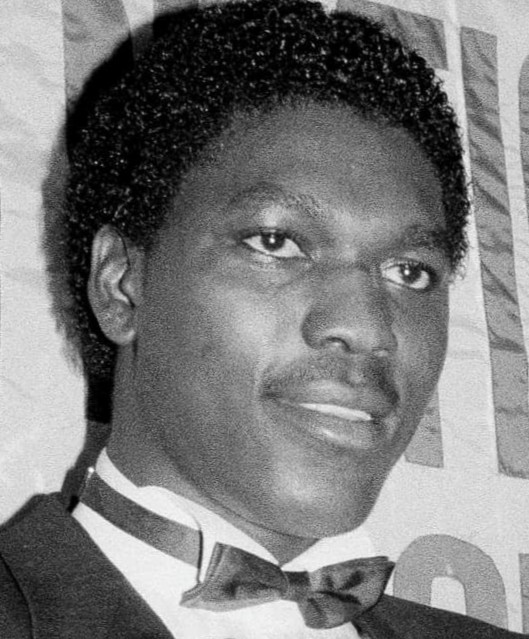
Akeem Olajuwon was selected first overall by the Houston Rockets.

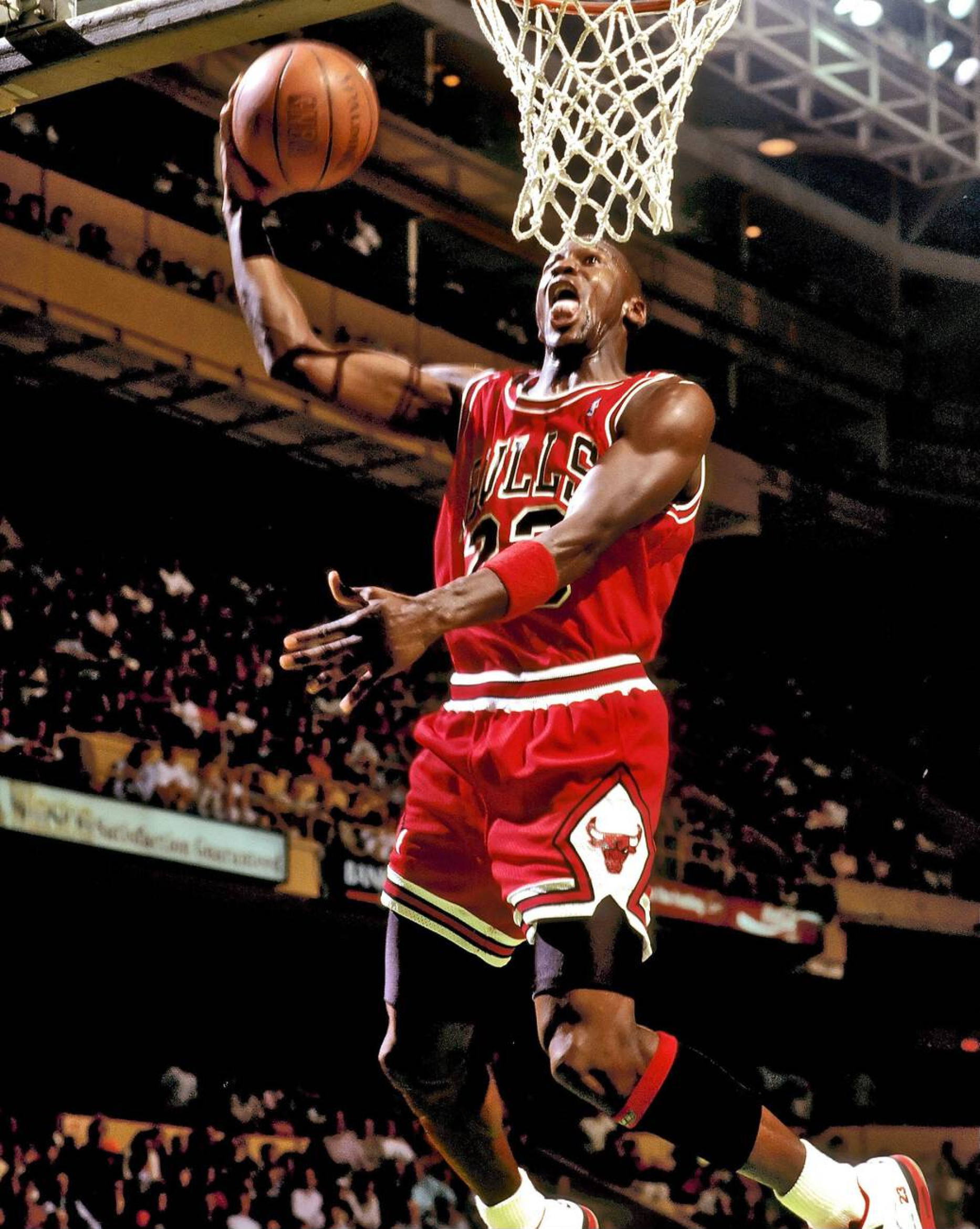
Michael Jordan was selected 3rd overall by the Chicago Bulls.

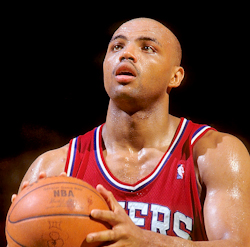
Charles Barkley was selected 5th overall by the Philadelphia 76ers.

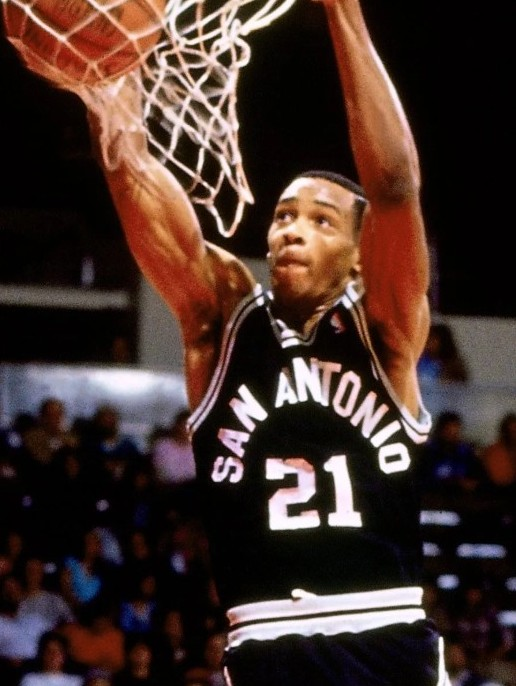
Alvin Robertson was selected 7th overall by the San Antonio Spurs.

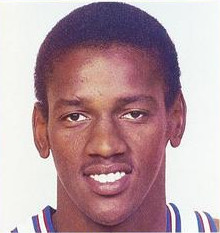
Otis Thorpe was selected 9th overall by the Kansas City Kings.

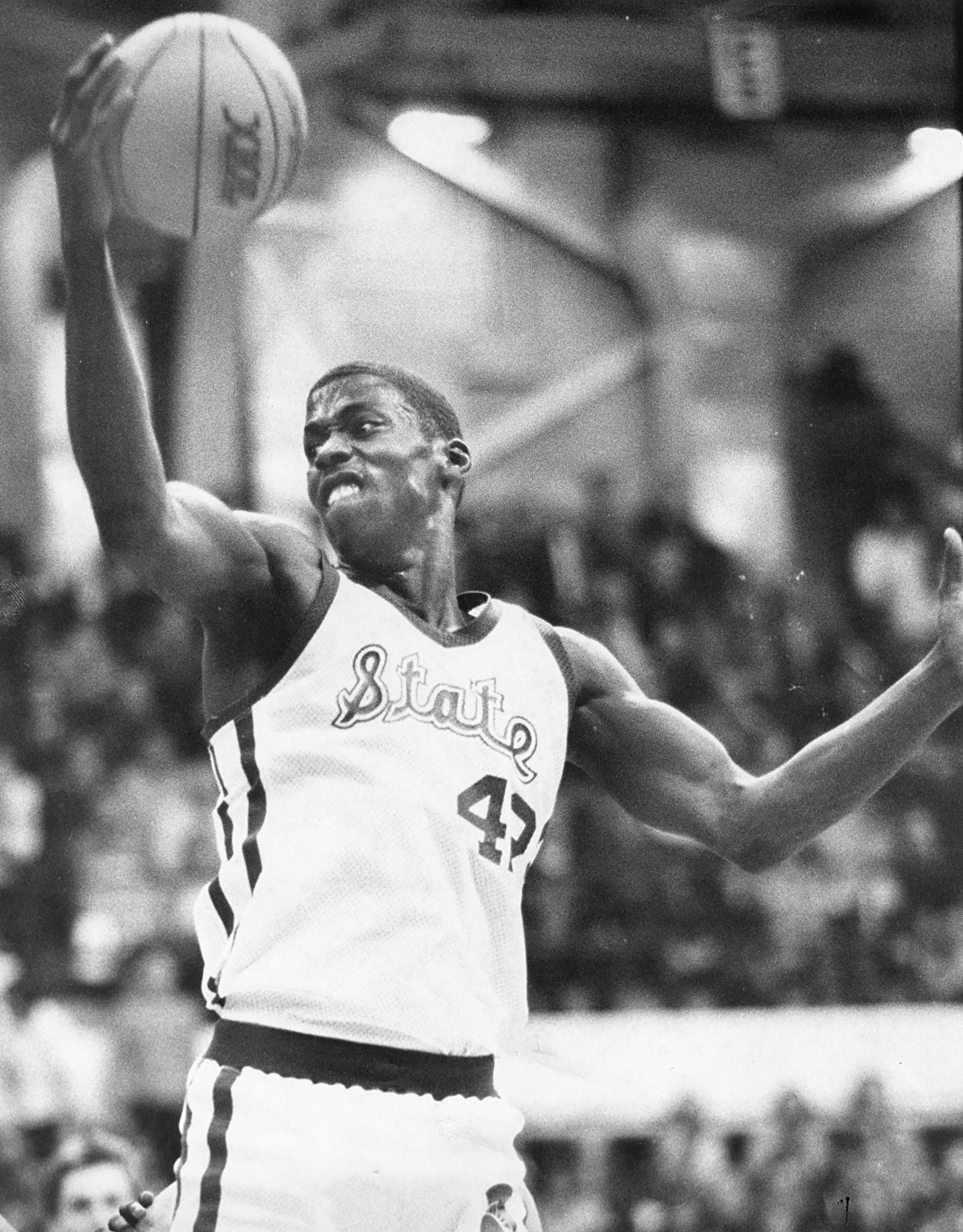
Kevin Willis was selected 11th overall by the Atlanta Hawks.

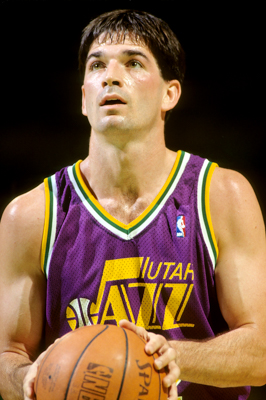
John Stockton was selected 16th overall by the Utah Jazz.

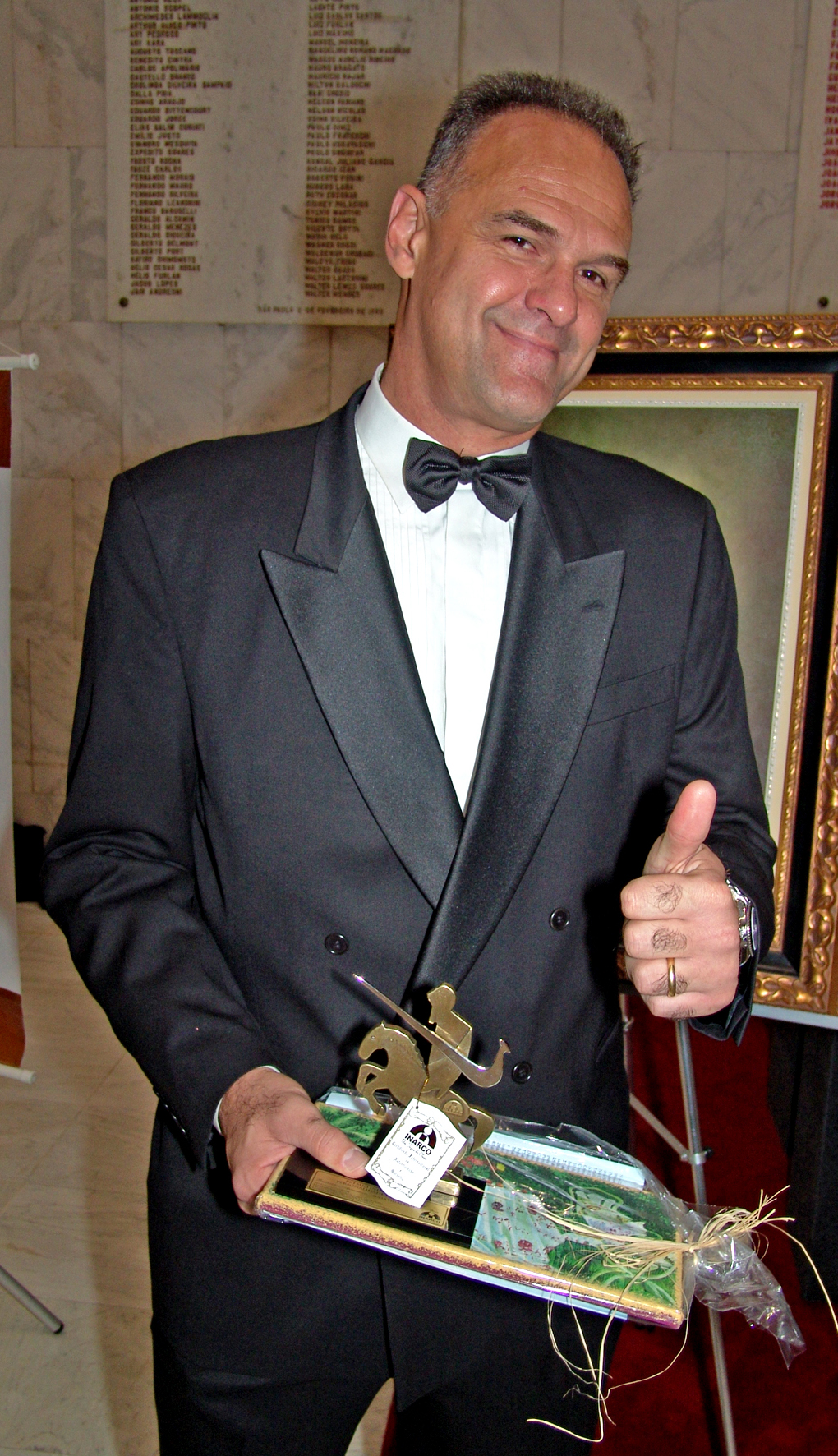
Oscar Schmidt was selected 131st overall by the New Jersey Nets.

G	Guard	F	Forward	C	Center

^	Denotes player who has been inducted to the Naismith Memorial Basketball Hall of Fame
*	Denotes player who has been selected for at least one All-Star Game and All-NBA Team
^{+}	Denotes player who has been selected for at least one All-Star Game
^{x}	Denotes player who has been selected for at least one All-NBA Team
^{#}	Denotes player who has never appeared in an NBA regular-season or playoff game
^{~}	Denotes player who has been selected as Rookie of the Year

Round	Pick	Player	Pos.	Nationality (Note: Nationality indicates the player's national team or representative nationality. If a player has not competed at the international level, then the nationality indicates the national team which the player is eligible to represent according to FIBA rules.)	Team	School/club team
1	1	Akeem Olajuwon^	C	Nigeria	Houston Rockets	Houston (Jr.)
1	2	Sam Bowie	C	United States	Portland Trail Blazers (from Indiana)^{[d]}	Kentucky (Sr.)
1	3	Michael Jordan^~	G/F	United States	Chicago Bulls	North Carolina (Jr.)
1	4	Sam Perkins	F/C	United States	Dallas Mavericks (from Cleveland)^{[e]}	North Carolina (Sr.)
1	5	Charles Barkley^	F	United States	Philadelphia 76ers (from L.A. Clippers)^{[f]}	Auburn (Jr.)
1	6	Melvin Turpin	C	United States	Washington Bullets (traded to Cleveland)^{[a]}	Kentucky (Sr.)
1	7	Alvin Robertson*	G	United States	San Antonio Spurs	Arkansas (Sr.)
1	8	Lancaster Gordon	G	United States	Los Angeles Clippers (from Golden State)^{[g]}	Louisville (Sr.)
1	9	Otis Thorpe^{+}	F/C	United States	Kansas City Kings	Providence (Sr.)
1	10	Leon Wood	G	United States	Philadelphia 76ers (from Denver)^{[h]}	Cal State Fullerton (Sr.)
1	11	Kevin Willis*	F/C	United States	Atlanta Hawks	Michigan State (Sr.)
1	12	Tim McCormick	C	United States	Cleveland Cavaliers (traded to Seattle)^{[a]}	Michigan (Sr.)
1	13	Jay Humphries	G	United States	Phoenix Suns	Colorado (Sr.)
1	14	Michael Cage	F/C	United States	Los Angeles Clippers (from Seattle)^{[i]}	San Diego State (Sr.)
1	15	Terence Stansbury	G	United States	Dallas Mavericks	Temple (Sr.)
1	16	John Stockton^	G	United States	Utah Jazz	Gonzaga (Sr.)
1	17	Jeff Turner	F/C	United States	New Jersey Nets	Vanderbilt (Sr.)
1	18	Vern Fleming	G	United States	Indiana Pacers (from New York)^{[j]}	Georgia (Sr.)
1	19	Bernard Thompson	G/F	United States	Portland Trail Blazers	Fresno State (Sr.)
1	20	Tony Campbell	G/F	United States	Detroit Pistons	Ohio State (Sr.)
1	21	Kenny Fields	G/F	United States	Milwaukee Bucks	UCLA (Sr.)
1	22	Tom Sewell	G	United States	Philadelphia 76ers (traded to Washington)^{[b]}	Lamar (Sr.)
1	23	Earl Jones	C	United States	Los Angeles Lakers	UDC (Sr.)
1	24	Michael Young	G/F	United States	Boston Celtics	Houston (Sr.)
2	25	Devin Durrant	F	United States	Indiana Pacers	Brigham Young (Sr.)
2	26	Victor Fleming^{#}	G	United States	Portland Trail Blazers (from Chicago via Indiana)^{[k]}	Xavier (Sr.)
2	27	Ron Anderson	G/F	United States	Cleveland Cavaliers	Fresno State (Sr.)
2	28	Cory Blackwell	F	United States	Seattle SuperSonics (from Houston)^{[l]}	Wisconsin (Jr.)
2	29	Stuart Gray	F/C	Panama	Indiana Pacers (from L.A. Clippers via Philadelphia)^{[m]}	UCLA (Jr.)
2	30	Steve Burtt	G	United States	Golden State Warriors (from Washington)^{[n]}	Iona (Sr.)
2	31	Jay Murphy	F	United States	Golden State Warriors (traded to L.A. Clippers)^{[c]}	Boston College (Sr.)
2	32	Eric Turner^{#}	G	United States	Detroit Pistons (from San Antonio)^{[o]}	Michigan (Jr.)
2	33	Steve Colter	G	United States	Portland Trail Blazers (from Denver)^{[p]}	New Mexico State (Sr.)
2	34	Tony Costner^{#}	C	United States	Washington Bullets (from Kansas City via Detroit and Atlanta)^{[q]}	Saint Joseph's (Sr.)
2	35	Othell Wilson	G	United States	Golden State Warriors (from Atlanta)^{[r]}	Virginia (Sr.)
2	36	Charles Jones	F	United States	Phoenix Suns	Louisville (Sr.)
2	37	Ben Coleman	F	United States	Chicago Bulls (from Seattle via Atlanta and Kansas City)^{[s]}	Maryland (Sr.)
2	38	Charlie Sitton	F	United States	Dallas Mavericks	Oregon State (Sr.)
2	39	Danny Young	G	United States	Seattle SuperSonics (from New Jersey)^{[t]}	Wake Forest (Sr.)
2	40	Anthony Teachey^{#}	F	United States	Dallas Mavericks (from Utah)^{[u]}	Wake Forest (Sr.)
2	41	Tom Sluby	G	United States	Dallas Mavericks (from New York via New Jersey)^{[v]}	Notre Dame (Sr.)
2	42	Willie White	G	United States	Denver Nuggets (from Portland)^{[w]}	Chattanooga (Sr.)
2	43	Greg Wiltjer^{#}	C	Canada	Chicago Bulls (from Detroit via Indiana and Kansas City)^{[x]}	Victoria (Canada) (Sr.)
2	44	Fred Reynolds^{#}	F	United States	Washington Bullets (from Milwaukee)^{[y]}	UTEP (Sr.)
2	45	Gary Plummer	F/C	United States	Golden State Warriors (from Philadelphia 76ers)^{[z]}	Boston University (Sr.)
2	46	Jerome Kersey	F	United States	Portland Trail Blazers (from L.A. Lakers)^{[aa]}	Longwood (Sr.)
2	47	Ronnie Williams^{#}	F	United States	Boston Celtics	Florida (Sr.)
3	48	James Banks^{#}	F	United States	Philadelphia 76ers	Georgia (Sr.)
3	49	Tim Dillon^{#}	F	United States	Chicago Bulls	Northern Illinois (Sr.)
3	50	Ben McDonald	F	United States	Cleveland Cavaliers	UC Irvine (Sr.)
3	51	Jim Petersen	F/C	United States	Houston Rockets	Minnesota (Sr.)
3	52	Terry Williams^{#}	G	United States	Seattle SuperSonics	Alabama (Sr.)
3	53	Ricky Ross^{#}	F	United States	Washington Bullets	Tulsa (Sr.)
3	54	Roosevelt Chapman^{#}	G	United States	Kansas City Kings	Dayton (Sr.)
3	55	Lewis Jackson^{#}	G	United States	Golden State Warriors	Alabama State (Sr.)
3	56	Jeff Allen^{#}	F	United States	Kansas City Kings	St. John's (Sr.)
3	57	Joe Binion	F	United States	San Antonio Spurs (from Denver)^{[ab]}	North Carolina A&T (Sr.)
3	58	Bobby Parks^{#}	F	United States	Atlanta Hawks	Memphis (Sr.)
3	59	Murray Jarman^{#}	C	United States	Phoenix Suns	Clemson (Sr.)
3	60	Leonard Mitchell^{#}	F	United States	Cleveland Cavaliers	LSU (Sr.)
3	61	Jeff Cross	F	United States	Dallas Mavericks	Maine (Sr.)
3	62	David Pope	F	United States	Utah Jazz	Norfolk State (Sr.)
3	63	Yommy Sangodeyi^{#}	F	Nigeria	New Jersey Nets	Sam Houston (Jr.)
3	64	Curtis Green^{#}	G	United States	New York Knicks	Southern Miss (Sr.)
3	65	Tim Kearney^{#}	C	United States	Portland Trail Blazers	West Virginia (Sr.)
3	66	Kevin Springman^{#}	F	United States	Detroit Pistons	Saint Joseph's (Sr.)
3	67	Vernon Delancy^{#}	F	United States	Milwaukee Bucks	Florida (Sr.)
3	68	Butch Graves	G	United States	Philadelphia 76ers	Yale (Sr.)
3	69	George Singleton^{#}	F	United States	Los Angeles Lakers	Furman (Sr.)
3	70	Rick Carlisle	G	United States	Boston Celtics	Virginia (Sr.)
4	71	Ralph Jackson	G	United States	Indiana Pacers	UCLA (Sr.)
4	72	Melvin Johnson^{#}	F	United States	Chicago Bulls	Charlotte (Sr.)
4	73	Art Aaron^{#}	F	United States	Cleveland Cavaliers	Northwestern (Sr.)
4	74	Willie Jackson^{#}	F	United States	Houston Rockets	Centenary (Sr.)
4	75	Marc Glass^{#}	G	United States	Los Angeles Clippers	Montana (Sr.)
4	76	Jim Grandholm	F	United States	Washington Bullets	South Florida (Sr.)
4	77	Mark Halsel^{#}	F	United States	Chicago Bulls	Northeastern (Sr.)
4	78	John Devereaux^{#}	C	United States	San Antonio Spurs	Ohio (Sr.)
4	79	Karl Tilleman^{#}	G	Canada	Denver Nuggets	Calgary (Sr.)
4	80	Carl Henry	G	United States	Kansas City Kings	Kansas (Sr.)
4	81	Dicky Beal^{#}	G	United States	Atlanta Hawks	Kentucky (Sr.)
4	82	Jeff Collins^{#}	G	United States	Phoenix Suns	UNLV (Sr.)
4	83	Jeff Jenkins^{#}	F	United States	Seattle SuperSonics	Xavier (Sr.)
4	84	John Horrocks^{#}	C	United States	Dallas Mavericks	North Texas (Sr.)
4	85	Hank Cornley^{#}	F	United States	New Jersey Nets	Illinois State (Sr.)
4	86	Jim Rowinski	F	United States	Utah Jazz	Purdue (Sr.)
4	87	Bob Thornton	F/C	United States	New York Knicks	UC Irvine (Sr.)
4	88	Brett Applegate^{#}	F	United States	Portland Trail Blazers	BYU (Sr.)
4	89	Phillip Smith^{#}	G	United States	Detroit Pistons	New Mexico (Sr.)
4	90	Ozell Jones	F/C	United States	San Antonio Spurs (from Milwaukee)^{[ac]}	Cal State Fullerton (Sr.)
4	91	Earl Harrison^{#}	F	United States	Philadelphia 76ers	Morehead State (Sr.)
4	92	John Revelli^{#}	F	United States	Los Angeles Lakers	Stanford (Sr.)
4	93	Kevin Mullin^{#}	F	United States	Boston Celtics	Princeton (Sr.)
5	94	Gene Smith^{#}	G	United States	Indiana Pacers	Georgetown (Sr.)
5	95	Lamont Robinson^{#}	G	United States	Chicago Bulls	Lamar (Sr.)
5	96	Vince Hinchen^{#}	G	United States	Cleveland Cavaliers	Boise State (Sr.)
5	97	Al McClain^{#}	G	United States	Houston Rockets	New Hampshire (Sr.)
5	98	Alonza Allen^{#}	F	United States	Los Angeles Clippers	Southwestern Louisiana (Sr.)
5	99	Colin Irish^{#}	F	United Kingdom	Washington Bullets	Bowling Green (Sr.)
5	100	Eric Richardson^{#}	G	United States	San Antonio Spurs	Alabama (Sr.)
5	101	Steve Bartek^{#}	F	United States	Golden State Warriors	Doane (Sr.)
5	102	Jim Foster^{#}	F	United States	Kansas City Kings	South Carolina (Sr.)
5	103	Prince Bridges^{#}	G	United States	Denver Nuggets	Missouri (Sr.)
5	104	Terry Martin^{#}	F	United States	Atlanta Hawks	Louisiana–Monroe (Sr.)
5	105	Bill Flye^{#}	C	United States	Phoenix Suns	Richmond (Sr.)
5	106	Eli Pasquale^{#}	G	Canada	Seattle SuperSonics	Victoria (Sr.)
5	107	Dave Williams^{#}	C	United States	Dallas Mavericks	UIC (Sr.)
5	108	Marcus Gaither^{#}	G	United States; France	Utah Jazz	Fairleigh Dickinson (Sr.)
5	109	Michael Gerren^{#}	G	United States	New Jersey Nets	South Alabama (Sr.)
5	110	Scott McCollum^{#}	F	United States	Golden State Warriors	Pepperdine (Sr.)
5	111	Mike Whitmarsh^{#}	F	United States	Portland Trail Blazers	San Diego (Sr.)
5	112	Rick Doyle^{#}	F	United States	Detroit Pistons	UTSA (Sr.)
5	113	Ernie Floyd^{#}	C	United States	Milwaukee Bucks	Holy Cross (Sr.)
5	114	Dan Federman^{#}	C	United States	Philadelphia 76ers	Tennessee (Sr.)
5	115	Lance Berwald^{#}	C	United States	Los Angeles Lakers	North Dakota State (Sr.)
5	116	Todd Orlando^{#}	F	United States	Boston Celtics	Bentley (Sr.)
6	117	Clyde Vaughan^{#}	F	United States	Indiana Pacers	Pittsburgh (Sr.)
6	118	Jeff Tipton^{#}	C	United States	Chicago Bulls	Morehead State (Sr.)
6	119	Matt Doherty^{#}	F	United States	Cleveland Cavaliers	North Carolina (Sr.)
6	120	McKinley Singleton	G	United States	Milwaukee Bucks (from Houston)^{[ad]}	UAB (Sr.)
6	121	Phillip Haynes^{#}	F	United States	Los Angeles Clippers	Memphis (Sr.)
6	122	Blaise Bugajski^{#}	G	United States	Washington Bullets	Illinois Wesleyan (Sr.)
6	123	Tony Martin^{#}	G	United States	Golden State Warriors	Wyoming (Sr.)
6	124	Dion Brown^{#}	F	United States	San Antonio Spurs	Southwestern Louisiana (Sr.)
6	125	Willie Burton^{#}	F	United States	Denver Nuggets	Tennessee (Sr.)
6	126	Bruce Vanley^{#}	C	United States	Kansas City Kings	Tulsa (Sr.)
6	127	Jim Master^{#}	G	United States	Atlanta Hawks	Kentucky (Sr.)
6	128	Herman Veal^{#}	F	United States	Phoenix Suns	Maryland (Sr.)
6	129	Graylin Warner^{#}	F	United States	Seattle SuperSonics	Southwestern Louisiana (Sr.)
6	130	LaVerne Evans^{#}	G	United States	Dallas Mavericks	Marshall (Sr.)
6	131	Oscar Schmidt^^{#}	G/F	Brazil	New Jersey Nets	S.E. Palmeiras (Brazil)
6	132	Chris Harrison^{#}	F	United States	Utah Jazz	West Virginia Wesleyan (Sr.)
6	133	Eddie Lee Wilkins	F/C	United States	New York Knicks	Gardner–Webb (Sr.)
6	134	Lance Ball^{#}	C	United States	Portland Trail Blazers	Western Oregon (Sr.)
6	135	Rennie Bailey^{#}	G	United States	Detroit Pistons	Louisiana Tech (Sr.)
6	136	Mike Reddick^{#}	F	United States	Milwaukee Bucks	Stetson (Sr.)
6	137	Gary Springer^{#}	F	United States	Philadelphia 76ers	Iona (Sr.)
6	138	Keith Jones^{#}	G	United States	Los Angeles Lakers	Stanford (Sr.)
6	139	Steve Carfino^{#}	G	United States	Boston Celtics	Iowa (Sr.)
7	140	Kenton Edelin	F	United States	Indiana Pacers	Virginia (Sr.)
7	141	Butch Hays^{#}	G	United States	Chicago Bulls	California (Sr.)
7	142	Joe Jakubick^{#}	G	United States	Cleveland Cavaliers	Akron (Sr.)
7	143	Joedy Gardner^{#}	G	United States	Houston Rockets	Long Beach State (Sr.)
7	144	David Brantley^{#}	F	United States	Los Angeles Clippers	Oregon (Sr.)
7	145	Tim Garrett^{#}	F	United States	Washington Bullets	New Mexico (Sr.)
7	146	Michael Pitts^{#}	C	United States	San Antonio Spurs	California (Sr.)
7	147	Cliff Higgins^{#}	F	United States	Golden State Warriors	Cal State Northridge (Sr.)
7	148	Chipper Harris^{#}	G	United States	Kansas City Kings	Robert Morris (Sr.)
7	149	Mark Simpson^{#}	F	United States	Denver Nuggets	Catawba (Sr.)
7	150	Vince Martello^{#}	F	United States	Atlanta Hawks	Florida State (Sr.)
7	151	Raymond Crenshaw^{#}	F	United States	Phoenix Suns	Oklahoma State (Sr.)
7	152	Gary Gatewood^{#}	G	United States	Seattle SuperSonics	Oregon (Sr.)
7	153	George Turner^{#}	G	United States	Dallas Mavericks	UC Irvine (Sr.)
7	154	Bob Evans^{#}	C	United States	Utah Jazz	Southern Utah (Sr.)
7	155	Sean Kerins^{#}	F	United States	New Jersey Nets	Syracuse (Sr.)
7	156	Ken Bannister	F/C	United States	New York Knicks	St. Augustine's (Sr.)
7	157	Victor Anger^{#}	F	United States	Portland Trail Blazers	Pepperdine (Sr.)
7	158	Barry Francisco^{#}	G	United States	Detroit Pistons	Bloomsburg (Sr.)
7	159	Tony William^{#}	G	United States	Milwaukee Bucks	Florida State (Sr.)
7	160	Richard Congo^{#}	F	United States	Philadelphia 76ers	Drexel (Sr.)
7	161	Richard Haenisch^{#}	F	United States	Los Angeles Lakers	Chaminade (Sr.)
7	162	Mark Van Valkenburg^{#}	F	United States	Boston Celtics	Framingham State (Sr.)
8	163	Tom Heitz^{#}	F	United States	Indiana Pacers	Kentucky (Sr.)
8	164	Brett Crawford^{#}	F	United States	Chicago Bulls	US International (Sr.)
8	165	Elliot Beard^{#}	G	United States	Cleveland Cavaliers	Oberlin (Sr.)
8	166	Greg Wolff^{#}	F	United States	Houston Rockets	Angelo State (Sr.)
8	167	Jim McLoughlin^{#}	G	United States	Los Angeles Clippers	Temple (Sr.)
8	168	Darryl Odom^{#}	G	United States	Washington Bullets	West Virginia Wesleyan (Sr.)
8	169	Paul Brozovich^{#}	C	United States	Golden State Warriors	UNLV (Sr.)
8	170	Dan Tarkanian^{#}	G	United States	San Antonio Spurs	UNLV (Sr.)
8	171	Bill Wendlandt^{#}	F	United States	Denver Nuggets	Texas (Sr.)
8	172	Nate Rollins^{#}	F	United States	Kansas City Kings	Fort Hays State (Sr.)
8	173	Robert Brown^{#}	G	United States	Atlanta Hawks	LIU Brooklyn (Sr.)
8	174	Mark Fothergill^{#}	F	United States	Phoenix Suns	Maryland (Sr.)
8	175	Jerry McMillan^{#}	G	United States	Seattle SuperSonics	DePaul (Sr.)
8	176	Leroy Sutton^{#}	F	United States	Dallas Mavericks	Arkansas (Sr.)
8	177	Chris Winans^{#}	C	United States	New Jersey Nets	Utah (Sr.)
8	178	Eric Booker^{#}	G	United States	Utah Jazz	UNLV (Sr.)
8	179	Ricky Tunstall^{#}	C	United States	New York Knicks	Youngstown State (Sr.)
8	180	Steve Flint^{#}	F	United States	Portland Trail Blazers	UC San Diego (Sr.)
8	181	Dale Roberts^{#}	C	United States	Detroit Pistons	Appalachian State (Sr.)
8	182	Brad Jergenson^{#}	F	United States	Milwaukee Bucks	South Carolina (Sr.)
8	183	Frank Dobbs^{#}	G	United States	Philadelphia 76ers	Villanova (Sr.)
8	184	Champ Godbolt^{#}	G	United States	Boston Celtics	Holy Cross (Sr.)
9	185	Brian Martin	F	United States	Indiana Pacers	Kansas (Sr.)
9	186	Calvin Pierce^{#}	F	United States	Chicago Bulls	Oklahoma (Sr.)
9	187	John Shimko^{#}	G	United States	Cleveland Cavaliers	Xavier (Sr.)
9	188	Bill Coon^{#}	F	United States	Houston Rockets	Presbyterian (Sr.)
9	189	Dave Schultz^{#}	G	United States	Los Angeles Clippers	Westmont (Sr.)
9	190	Mike Emanuel^{#}	G	United States	Washington Bullets	UNC Pembroke (Sr.)
9	191	Melvin Roseboro^{#}	G	United States	San Antonio Spurs	Saint Mary's (Sr.)
9	192	Mitch Arnold^{#}	G	United States	Golden State Warriors	Fresno State (Sr.)
9	193	Greg Turner^{#}	F	United States	Kansas City Kings	Auburn (Sr.)
9	194	Cecil Exum^{#}	F	United States; Australia	Denver Nuggets	North Carolina (Sr.)
9	195	Fred Brown^{#}	G	United States	Atlanta Hawks	Georgetown (Sr.)
9	196	Buddy Cox^{#}	F	United States	Phoenix Suns	Bellarmine (Sr.)
9	197	Mike Williams^{#}	C	United States	Seattle SuperSonics	Idaho State (Sr.)
9	198	John Tudor^{#}	G	United States	Dallas Mavericks	LSU (Sr.)
9	199	Kelly Knight^{#}	F	United States	Utah Jazz	Kansas (Sr.)
9	200	Bill Ryan^{#}	G	United States	New Jersey Nets	Princeton (Sr.)
9	201	Marc Marotta^{#}	F	United States	New York Knicks	Marquette (Sr.)
9	202	Dennis Black^{#}	F	United States	Portland Trail Blazers	Portland (Sr.)
9	203	Ben Tower^{#}	F	United States	Detroit Pistons	Michigan State (Sr.)
9	204	Edwin Green^{#}	C	United States	Milwaukee Bucks	UMass (Sr.)
9	205	Michael Mitchell^{#}	C	United States	Philadelphia 76ers	Drexel (Sr.)
9	206	Joe Dickson^{#}	F	United States	Boston Celtics	Merrimack (Sr.)
10	207	Gary Carver^{#}	F	United States	Indiana Pacers	Western Kentucky (Sr.)
10	208	Carl Lewis^{#}	–	United States	Chicago Bulls	Houston (Sr.)
10	209	Darrell Space^{#}	F	United States	Cleveland Cavaliers	Northeastern Illinois (Sr.)
10	210	Robert Turner^{#}	G	United States	Houston Rockets	Canisius (Sr.)
10	211	Dick Mumma^{#}	C	United States	Los Angeles Clippers	Penn State (Sr.)
10	212	Glynn Myrick^{#}	G	United States	Washington Bullets	Stetson (Sr.)
10	213	Tim Bell^{#}	F	United States	Golden State Warriors	UC Riverside (Sr.)
10	214	Frank Rodriguez^{#}	F	United States	San Antonio Spurs	New Mexico State (Sr.)
10	215	Dexter Bailey^{#}	F	United States	Denver Nuggets	Xavier (Sr.)
10	216	Victor Coleman^{#}	G	United States	Kansas City Kings	Northwest Missouri State (Sr.)
10	217	Doug Mills^{#}	G	United States	Atlanta Hawks	Hofstra (Sr.)
10	218	Ezra Hill^{#}	G	United States	Phoenix Suns	Liberty (Sr.)
10	219	Greg Brandon^{#}	F	United States	Seattle SuperSonics	Creighton (Sr.)
10	220	Napoleon Johnson^{#}	F	United States	Dallas Mavericks	Grambling State (Sr.)
10	221	Phil Jamison^{#}	G	United States	New Jersey Nets	Saint Peter's (Sr.)
10	222	Mike Curran^{#}	G	United States	Utah Jazz	Niagara (Sr.)
10	223	Mike Henderson^{#}	F	Jamaica	New York Knicks	LIU Post (Sr.)
10	224	Randy Dunn^{#}	F	United States	Portland Trail Blazers	George Fox (Sr.)
10	225	Dan Pelekoudas^{#}	G	United States	Detroit Pistons	Michigan (Sr.)
10	226	Mike Toomer^{#}	C	United States	Milwaukee Bucks	Florida A&M (Sr.)
10	227	Martin Clark^{#}	F	United Kingdom	Philadelphia 76ers	Boston College (Sr.)
10	228	Dan Trant^{#}	G	Ireland	Boston Celtics	Clark (Sr.)

== Trades involving draft picks ==
=== Draft day trades ===
The following trades involving drafted players were made on the day of the draft.

- ^{a 1} ^{2} In a three-team trade, Cleveland acquired the draft rights to sixth pick Melvin Turpin from Washington, Washington acquired Cliff Robinson from Cleveland and Gus Williams from Seattle, and Seattle acquired Ricky Sobers from Washington and the draft rights to 12th pick Tim McCormick from Cleveland.
- ^{b} Washington acquired the draft rights to 22nd pick Tom Sewell from Philadelphia in exchange for a 1988 first-round pick.
- ^{c} The L.A. Clippers acquired the draft rights to 31st pick Jay Murphy from Golden State in exchange for Jerome Whitehead.

=== Predraft trades ===
Prior to the day of the draft, the following trades were made and resulted in exchanges of picks between the teams.

- ^{d} On June 5, 1981, Portland acquired a first-round pick from Indiana in exchange for Tom Owens. Portland used the pick to draft Sam Bowie.
- ^{e} On September 16, 1980, Dallas acquired a first-round pick from Cleveland in exchange for Mike Bratz. Dallas used the pick to draft Sam Perkins.
- ^{f} On October 12, 1978, Philadelphia acquired a first-round pick from the L.A. Clippers (as San Diego) in exchange for World B. Free. Philadelphia used the pick to draft Charles Barkley.
- ^{g} On August 28, 1980, the L.A. Clippers (as San Diego) acquired Phil Smith and a first-round pick from Golden State in exchange for World B. Free. The L.A. Clippers used the pick to draft Lancaster Gordon.
- ^{h} On August 16, 1978, Philadelphia acquired Bobby Jones, Ralph Simpson and a first-round pick from Denver in exchange for George McGinnis and a 1978 first-round pick. Philadelphia used the pick to draft Leon Wood.
- ^{i} On August 18, 1983, the L.A. Clippers (as San Diego) acquired James Donaldson, Greg Kelser, Mark Radford, a first-round pick and a 1985 second-round pick from Seattle in exchange for Tom Chambers, Al Wood, a third-round pick and a 1987 second-round pick. The L.A. Clippers used the pick to draft Michael Cage.
- ^{j} On September 17, 1983, Indiana acquired Vince Taylor and a first-round pick from New York in a three-team trade with New York and Kansas City. Indiana used the pick to draft Vern Fleming.
- ^{k} On August 18, 1983, Portland acquired a second-round pick from Indiana in exchange for Granville Waiters. Previously, Indiana acquired the draft rights to Sidney Lowe and the pick on June 28, 1983, from Chicago in exchange for the draft rights to Mitchell Wiggins. Portland used the pick to draft Victor Fleming.
- ^{l} On October 5, 1982, Seattle acquired a second-round pick from Houston in exchange for Wally Walker. Seattle used the pick to draft Cory Blackwell.
- ^{m} On February 15, 1983, Indiana acquired Russ Schoene a second-round pick and a 1983 first-round pick from Philadelphia in exchange for Clemon Johnson and a third-round pick. Previously, Philadelphia acquired the pick and a 1983 fourth-round pick on October 27, 1982, from the L.A. Clippers (as San Diego) in exchange for Lionel Hollins. Indiana used the pick to draft Stuart Gray.
- ^{n} On October 19, 1981, Golden State acquired 1982 and 1984 second-round picks from Washington in exchange for John Lucas. Golden State used the pick to draft Steve Burtt.
- ^{o} On February 10, 1983, Detroit a second-round pick and a 1985 third-round pick from San Antonio in exchange for Edgar Jones. Detroit used the pick to draft Eric Turner.
- ^{p} On August 15, 1980, Portland acquired a second-round pick and a 1983 first-round pick from Denver in exchange for T. R. Dunn and a 1983 first-round pick. Portland used the pick to draft Steve Colter.
- ^{q} On July 5, 1983, Washington acquired Tom McMillen and a second-round pick from Atlanta in exchange for Randy Wittman. Previously, Atlanta acquired the pick and a 1985 second-round pick on February 13, 1983, from Detroit in a three-team trade with Detroit and Seattle. Previously, Detroit acquired the pick and a 1982 second-round pick on August 26, 1981, from Kansas City in exchange for Larry Drew. Washington used the pick to draft Tony Costner.
- ^{r} On February 15, 1983, Golden State acquired a second-round pick from Atlanta in exchange for Rickey Brown. Golden State used the pick to draft Othell Wilson.
- ^{s} On June 28, 1983, Chicago acquired the draft rights to Ennis Whatley, the draft rights to Chris McNealy and a second-round pick from Kansas City in exchange for Mark Olberding and the draft rights to Larry Micheaux. Previously, Kansas City acquired the pick on June 30, 1982, from Atlanta in exchange for the draft rights to Jim Johnstone. Previously, Atlanta acquired the pick and a 1983 second-round pick on December 2, 1980, from Seattle in exchange for Armond Hill. Chicago used the pick to draft Ben Coleman.
- ^{t} On November 25, 1981, Seattle acquired Ray Tolbert and a second-round pick from New Jersey in exchange for James Bailey. Seattle used the pick to draft Danny Young.
- ^{u} On September 11, 1980, Dallas acquired a second-round pick and a 1983 second-round pick from Utah in exchange for Billy McKinney. Dallas used the pick to draft Anthony Teachey.
- ^{v} On August 12, 1983, Dallas acquired Foots Walker, a second-round pick and a 1985 first-round pick from New Jersey in exchange for Kelvin Ransey. Previously, New Jersey acquired the second-round pick on June 22, 1983, from New York in exchange for Len Elmore. Dallas used the pick to draft Tom Sluby.
- ^{w} On June 7, 1984, Denver acquired Wayne Cooper, Lafayette Lever, Calvin Natt, a second-round pick and a 1985 first-round pick from Portland in exchange for Kiki Vandeweghe. Denver used the pick to draft Willie White.
- ^{x} On February 15, 1984, Chicago acquired Steve Johnson, a second-round pick and two 1985 second-round picks from Kansas City in exchange for Reggie Theus. Previously, Kansas City acquired Billy Knight and the pick on September 17, 1983, from Indiana in a three-team trade with Indiana and New York. Previously, Indiana acquired the pick on September 22, 1982, from Detroit in exchange for Tom Owens. Chicago used the pick to draft Greg Wiltjer.
- ^{y} On September 30, 1983, Washington acquired a second-round pick from Milwaukee in exchange for Kevin Grevey. Washington used the pick to draft Fred Reynolds.
- ^{z} On November 12, 1983, Golden State acquired a second-round pick from Philadelphia in exchange for Sam Williams. Golden State used the pick to draft Gary Plummer.
- ^{aa} On October 8, 1980, Portland acquired a second-round pick from the L.A. Lakers in exchange for Jim Brewer. Portland used the pick to draft Jerome Kersey.
- ^{ab} On January 21, 1984, San Antonio acquired a third-round pick from Denver in exchange for Keith Edmonson. San Antonio used the pick to draft Joe Binion.
- ^{ac} On March 8, 1984, San Antonio acquired a fourth-round pick from Milwaukee as compensation for the signing of Mike Dunleavy as a free agent. San Antonio used the pick to draft Ozell Jones.
- ^{ad} On October 5, 1983, Milwaukee acquired a sixth-round pick from Houston as compensation for the signing of Phil Ford as a free agent. Milwaukee used the pick to draft McKinley Singleton.

== Legacy ==
The Houston Rockets used their first pick to draft Akeem Olajuwon, a junior center from the University of Houston. The Nigerian-born Olajuwon became the second foreign-born player to be drafted first overall, after Mychal Thompson from the Bahamas in 1978. The Portland Trail Blazers used the second overall pick to draft Sam Bowie from the University of Kentucky. The Chicago Bulls used the third pick to draft Naismith and Wooden College Player of the Year Michael Jordan from the University of North Carolina. Jordan went on to win the Rookie of the Year Award and was also selected to the All-NBA Second Team in his rookie season. Jordan's teammate at North Carolina, Sam Perkins, was drafted fourth by the Dallas Mavericks. Charles Barkley, a junior forward from Auburn University, was drafted fifth by the Philadelphia 76ers. Olajuwon, Jordan and Barkley, along with the 16th pick John Stockton and the 131st pick Oscar Schmidt, have been inducted to the Naismith Memorial Basketball Hall of Fame. The first four mentioned players were also named in the 50 Greatest Players in NBA History list announced at the league's 50th anniversary in 1996.

Olajuwon's achievements include two NBA championships, two Finals Most Valuable Player Awards, one Most Valuable Player Award, two Defensive Player of the Year Awards, twelve All-NBA Team selections, twelve All-Star Game selections and nine All-Defensive Team selections. Olajuwon retired as the all–time league leader in total blocked shots with 3,830 blocks.

The third pick, Jordan, achieved even greater success than Olajuwon. He won six NBA championships, six Finals Most Valuable Player Awards, five Most Valuable Player Awards, one Defensive Player of the Year Award, eleven All-NBA Team selections, fourteen All-Star Game selections, three NBA All Star Game MVP Awards, and nine All-Defensive Team selections.

Barkley and Stockton never won an NBA championship, but both players received numerous awards and honors. Barkley won the Most Valuable Player in 1993 and was selected to eleven All-NBA Teams, eleven All-Star Games, and was the MVP of the 1991 All Star Game. Stockton was selected to eleven All-NBA Teams, ten All-Star Games and five All-Defensive Teams before retiring as the all–time league leader in assists and steals and was co-MVP of the 1993 All Star Game along with his Utah Jazz teammate Karl Malone. Jordan, Barkley and Stockton would later play as teammates for the 1992 "Dream Team".

Alvin Robertson, the seventh pick, is the only other player from this draft who has won annual NBA awards as a player; he won both the Defensive Player of the Year Award and the Most Improved Player Award in 1986. He was also selected to one All-NBA Team, four All-Star Games, six consecutive All-Defensive Teams. Both Robertson and Olajuwon are among only four players in NBA history who have ever achieved the extremely rare feat of recording a quadruple double.

Two other players from this draft, ninth pick Otis Thorpe and eleventh pick Kevin Willis, were also selected to one All-Star Game each. Thorpe won a championship in 1994 with the Rockets, while Willis won a championship in 2003 with the Spurs and also had one selection to the All-NBA Team. Rick Carlisle, the 70th pick, became a coach after ending his playing career and won the Coach of the Year Award in 2002 while coaching the Detroit Pistons. In 2011, he coached the Dallas Mavericks to an NBA Championship.

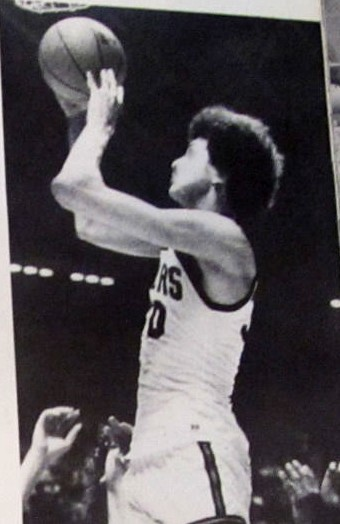
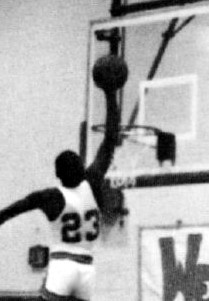
The Trail Blazers selection of Sam Bowie (left) over future Hall of Famer Michael Jordan (right) would become a noteworthy moment in NBA draft history.

The 1984 draft class is considered to be one of the best in NBA history as it produced five Hall of Famers and seven All-Stars. However, it was also marked by the Blazers' selection of Sam Bowie, considered one of the biggest draft busts in NBA history. It is believed that the Blazers picked Bowie over Michael Jordan because they already had an All Star shooting guard in Jim Paxson and a young shooting guard in Clyde Drexler, whom they drafted in the 1983 draft. Although Drexler went on to have a successful career, Bowie's career was cut short by injuries; he had missed two of the past three seasons in his college career as well. Despite having a 10-year career in the NBA and averaging 10.9 points and 7.5 rebounds per game, Bowie's career was interrupted by five leg surgeries, which limited him to 139 games in five years with the Blazers.

=== Other notable selections ===
Brazilian Oscar Schmidt was drafted with the 131st pick in the sixth round by the New Jersey Nets. However, Schmidt turned down the offers to play in the NBA and stayed to play in Italy and later in Brazil, in order to continue representing his country in international competitions, which was not allowed until NBA's agreement with the International Basketball Federation (FIBA) in 1990 allowing their players to represent their countries on a national level. He played in five Olympics and was the top scorer in three of them. He finished his career with 49,703 points with various clubs and the Brazilian national team, more than the NBA's career scoring leader at the time, Kareem Abdul-Jabbar, who scored 38,387 points in his NBA career, and yet to be surpassed by current leader LeBron James' 42,184 points. In 2010, FIBA honored Schmidt with an induction to the FIBA Hall of Fame, and Schmidt was inducted by the Naismith Memorial Basketball Hall of Fame in 2013.

University of Houston track and field Olympic Champion Carl Lewis, who had never played college basketball, was drafted by the Chicago Bulls with the 208th pick in the 10th round. Lewis would dominate the Olympic Games in Los Angeles in the summer of 1984. Lewis, who had also been drafted in the NFL draft of the same year by the Dallas Cowboys, stayed with his athletics career and went on to win nine Olympic gold medals and eight World Championships gold medals.

In the fifth round, the Portland Trail Blazers drafted Mike Whitmarsh, who starred for the University of San Diego in both basketball and volleyball, with the 111th pick. Whitmarsh played professional basketball in Germany for three years, but never played in the NBA. He then left basketball to play beach volleyball, where he achieved greater success, including a silver medal in the Olympics.

The final pick in the 1984 Draft, number 228 by the Boston Celtics, was Dan Trant of Clark University. Trant never played in a regular season game for the Celtics. Trant was working in his office at the World Trade Center on September 11, 2001, and was killed in the terrorist attacks that day.

This draft would be the last of the NBA that would be without any undrafted players entering the NBA. Starting from 1985 onward, multiple undrafted players from each year would enter the NBA, with more of them coming after the league decreased the number of rounds from the draft from 10 to the current two.

== Early entrants ==
=== College underclassmen ===
For the sixth time in seven years, no college underclassman would withdraw their entry into the NBA draft, with nine total players qualifying for this year's event. However, this draft would be the first NBA draft to showcase that college underclassmen like Akeem Olajuwon, Michael Jordan, and Charles Barkley could succeed just as well as players that had four years of collegiate experience. Not only that, but it would also be the first NBA draft to showcase more than one foreign-born entities qualifying as college underclassmen with two Nigerian born players (including Akeem Olajuwon) and one Panamanian born player doing so. The following college basketball players successfully applied for early draft entrance.

- (United States) Charles Barkley – F, Auburn (junior)
- (United States) Cory Blackwell – G, Wisconsin (junior)
- (Panama) Stuart Gray – C, UCLA (junior)
- (United States) Michael Jordan – G, North Carolina (junior)
- (United States) Tim McCormick – C, Michigan (junior)
- (United States) Sam Norton – F, Texas–Arlington (sophomore)
- (Nigeria) Akeem Olajuwon – C, Houston (junior)
- (Nigeria) Yommy Sangodeyi – F, Sam Houston State (junior)
- (United States) Eric Turner – G, Michigan (junior)

== Invited attendees ==
The 1984 NBA draft is considered to be the seventh NBA draft to have utilized what's properly considered the "green room" experience for NBA prospects. The NBA's green room is a staging area where anticipated draftees often sit with their families and representatives, waiting for their names to be called on draft night. Often being positioned either in front of or to the side of the podium (in this case, being positioned in the Madison Square Garden's Felt Forum for the third year in a row), once a player heard his name, he would walk to the podium to shake hands and take promotional photos with the NBA commissioner. From there, the players often conducted interviews with various media outlets while backstage. However, once the NBA draft started to air nationally on TV starting with the 1980 NBA draft, the green room evolved from players waiting to hear their name called and then shaking hands with these select players who were often called to the hotel to take promotional pictures with the NBA commissioner a day or two after the draft concluded to having players in real-time waiting to hear their names called up and then shaking hands with David Stern, the NBA's newest commissioner at the time. The NBA compiled its list of green room invites through collective voting by the NBA's team presidents and general managers alike, which in this year's case belonged to only what they believed were the top nine prospects at the time. However, for the third year in a row, one invite in Devin Durrant would end up staying in the green room by the start of the second round. Not only that, but two notable absentees for green room invites by the NBA were Michael Jordan and John Stockton. With that in mind, the following players were invited to attend this year's draft festivities live and in person.

- (United States) Charles Barkley – SF/PF, Auburn
- (United States) Sam Bowie – C, Kentucky
- (United States) Tony Campbell – SG/SF, Ohio State
- (United States) Devin Durrant – SF, Brigham Young
- (Nigeria) Akeem Olajuwon – C, Houston
- (United States) Otis Thorpe – PF/C, Providence
- (United States) Melvin Turpin – C, Kentucky
- (United States) Kevin Willis – PF/C, Michigan State
- (United States) Michael Young – SG/SF, Houston

== Notes ==
1: When Hakeem Olajuwon first arrived to the United States in 1981, his first name was incorrectly spelled as "Akeem". He used that spelling until March 9, 1991, when he announced that he would add an H and changed it to "Hakeem", the original Arabic spelling of his name.
2: Hakeem Olajuwon was born in Nigeria, but became a naturalized United States citizen in 1993. He has represented the United States national team.
3: As compensation for the first-round draft picks traded away by the previous owner, Ted Stepien, the Cleveland Cavaliers were awarded extra first-round draft picks in the 1983, 1984, 1985 and 1986 drafts in exchange for cash.
4: Even though Tim McCormick was a senior, he had one year of college eligibility remaining and thus had to apply for early entry.
5: Stuart Gray was born in the Panama Canal Zone which was controlled by the United States. He has represented Panama national team.

== See also ==
- List of first overall NBA draft picks
