= Leon Wood =

American basketball player and referee (born 1962)

Personal information
- Born: March 25, 1962 (age 64) Columbia, South Carolina, U.S.
- Listed height: 6 ft 3 in (1.91 m)
- Listed weight: 185 lb (84 kg)

Career information
- High school: Saint Monica (Santa Monica, California)
- College: Arizona (1979–1980); Cal State Fullerton (1981–1984)
- NBA draft: 1984: 1st round, 10th overall pick
- Drafted by: Philadelphia 76ers
- Playing career: 1984–1994
- Position: Point guard / shooting guard
- Number: 20, 32, 33, 1, 22
- Officiating career: 1996–present

Career history
- 1984–1986: Philadelphia 76ers
- 1986: Washington Bullets
- 1986–1987: New Jersey Nets
- 1987–1988: San Antonio Spurs
- 1988: Atlanta Hawks
- 1988–1989: CAI Zaragoza
- 1989–1990: Santa Barbara Islanders
- 1990: New Jersey Nets
- 1990: Sacramento Kings
- 1990–1991: Rapid City Thrillers
- 1991: Pallacanestro Varese
- 1991: Gießen 46ers
- 1991–1992: Rapid City Thrillers
- 1992–1993: CRO Lyon
- 1993–1994: Fargo-Moorhead Fever
- 1994: Onyx Caserta
- 1994: Purefoods TJ Hotdogs

Career highlights
- All-CBA Second Team (1990); Consensus second-team All-American (1984); 3× First-team All-PCAC (1982–1984); No. 20 retired by Cal State Fullerton Titans; Third-team Parade All-American (1979)
- Stats at NBA.com
- Stats at Basketball Reference
Medals
Men's basketball
Representing the United States
Olympic Games
Gold medal – first place	1984 Los Angeles	Team competition
Pan American Games
Gold medal – first place	1983 Caracas	Team competition

Osie Leon Wood III (born March 25, 1962), is an American former professional basketball player. A college All-American, he was a first round NBA draft pick, and both an Olympic and Pan-Am Games gold-medalist. He subsequently has had a career as an NBA referee.

== Career ==
A 6'3" point guard from Saint Monica Catholic High School, Wood was an All-American at California State University-Fullerton. He was selected by the Philadelphia 76ers as the 10th pick in the first round of the 1984 NBA draft and played in six NBA seasons for six different teams: the 76ers, Washington Bullets, New Jersey Nets, San Antonio Spurs, Atlanta Hawks and Sacramento Kings.

In his NBA career, Wood played in 274 games and scored a total of 1,742 points (6.4 points per game). He was a contestant in the first NBA 3-point shootout at the All-Star Weekend in Dallas in 1986. Wood had a short European professional league stint in Germany for MTV 1846 Giessen, where he was signed for the playoffs and appeared in three games, scoring a total of 77 points. He also played for CAI Zaragoza (ACB League) in the 1988–1989 season. Wood played four seasons in the Continental Basketball Association, averaging 18.1 points and 8.5 assists in 118 games, being named second-team All-CBA in 1990. Wood last played professional basketball in the Philippine Basketball Association in 1994, where he led the Purefoods franchise to a semifinal finish.

Wood is a two-time International gold-medalist, winning at the 1983 Pan American Games and as a member of the 1984 U.S. Olympic basketball team coached by Bobby Knight. Wood averaged 7.9 assists to lead the 1984 Olympic team.

He became an NBA official in 1996. He has now been an official for over 30 years.

Wood filed lawsuit against NBA for violations of antitrust laws. Both District Court and Court of Appeals for the Second Circuit ruled in favor of NBA.

== Career statistics ==
Legend
GP	Games played	GS	Games started	MPG	Minutes per game
FG%	Field goal percentage	3P%	3-point field goal percentage	FT%	Free throw percentage
RPG	Rebounds per game	APG	Assists per game	SPG	Steals per game
BPG	Blocks per game	PPG	Points per game	**Bold**	Career high

=== NBA ===
==== Regular season ====
Year	Team	GP	GS	MPG	FG%	3P%	FT%	RPG	APG	SPG	BPG	PPG
1984–85	Philadelphia	38	1	7.1	.373	.133	.692	.5	1.2	.2	.0	3.2
1985–86	Philadelphia	29	1	15.7	.419	.448	.794	.9	2.6	.5	.0	5.3
1985–86	Washington	39	0	19.1	.385	.329	.793	**1.6**	2.7	.5	.0	**9.7**
1986–87	New Jersey	**76**	7	**22.8**	.373	.300	.799	**1.6**	**4.9**	**.6**	.0	7.3
1987–88	San Antonio	38	**8**	21.8	.426	.398	.758	1.3	4.1	**.6**	.0	9.3
1987–88	Atlanta	14	0	5.6	**.533**	**.474**	.875	.4	1.4	.3	.0	3.4
1989–90	New Jersey	28	2	7.1	.327	.190	.875	.4	1.7	.2	.0	1.8
1990–91	Sacramento	12	0	18.5	.397	.316	**.905**	**1.6**	4.1	.4	.0	6.8
Career		274	19	16.5	.392	.326	.792	1.2	3.2	.5	.0	6.4

==== Playoffs ====
Year	Team	GP	GS	MPG	FG%	3P%	FT%	RPG	APG	SPG	BPG	PPG
1985	Philadelphia	**5**	0	**3.0**	.444	.000	.750	**.2**	**.4**	.0	.0	2.8
1986	Washington	1	0	2.0	.200	**1.000**	**1.000**	.0	.0	.0	.0	**5.0**
1988	Atlanta	4	0	1.0	**1.000**	**1.000**	–	.0	.3	.0	0	.8
Career		10	0	2.1	.400	.667	.800	.1	.3	.0	.0	2.2
