= Sam Bowie =

American basketball player (born 1961)

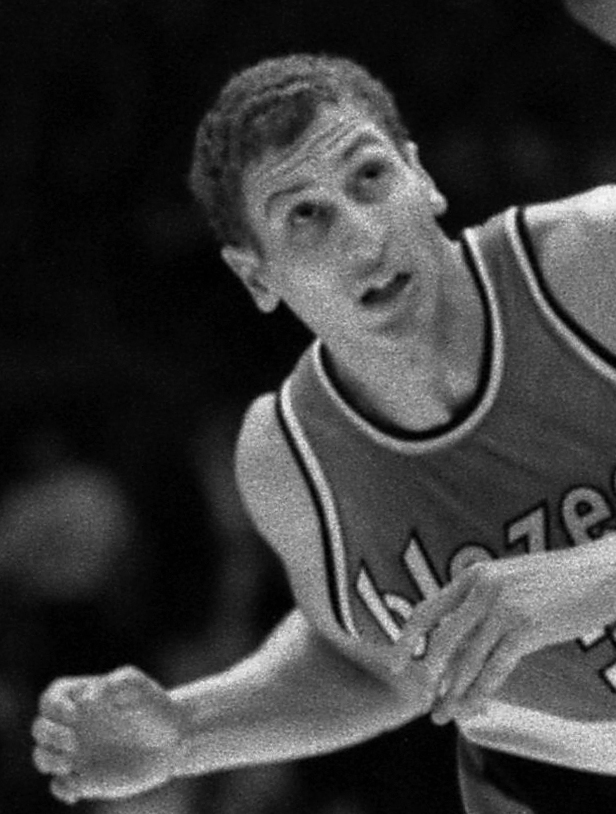
- Bowie playing during the 1985 NBA Playoffs

Personal information
- Born: March 17, 1961 (age 65) Lebanon, Pennsylvania, U.S.
- Listed height: 7 ft 1 in (2.16 m)
- Listed weight: 235 lb (107 kg)

Career information
- High school: Lebanon (Lebanon, Pennsylvania)
- College: Kentucky (1979–1984)
- NBA draft: 1984: 1st round, 2nd overall pick
- Drafted by: Portland Trail Blazers
- Playing career: 1984–1995
- Position: Center
- Number: 30, 31

Career history
- 1984–1989: Portland Trail Blazers
- 1989–1993: New Jersey Nets
- 1993–1995: Los Angeles Lakers

Career highlights
- NBA All-Rookie First Team (1985); Consensus second-team All-American (1981); Second-team All-American – AP (1984); First-team All-SEC (1981); Second-team All-SEC (1980); No. 31 retired by Kentucky Wildcats; McDonald's All-American (1979); First-team Parade All-American (1979)

Career NBA statistics
- Points: 5,564 (10.9 ppg)
- Rebounds: 3,845 (7.5 rpg)
- Blocks: 909 (1.8 bpg)
- Stats at NBA.com
- Stats at Basketball Reference

Samuel Paul Bowie (born March 17, 1961) is an American former professional basketball player. A national sensation in high school and outstanding collegian and Olympic team member, Bowie's professional promise was undermined by repeated injuries to his legs and feet. In spite of the setbacks, the 7 ft 1 in (2.16 m) and 235 lb (107 kg) center played ten seasons in the National Basketball Association (NBA).

Projected as a solid first-rounder in the 1984 NBA draft, Bowie was chosen by the Portland Trail Blazers as the second selection, notably ahead of Michael Jordan.

== Early life ==
Bowie was born on March 17, 1961, as the son of Ben Bowie and Cathy "Sammy" Bowie. His father was 6 ft 10 in (2.08 m) and had played basketball for the Harlem Magicians for six seasons. Bowie's parents divorced when he was 12. After the divorce, Bowie lived with both of his parents in Lebanon, Pennsylvania. Concerned about not showing favoritism toward either parent, he then lived with his maternal grandmother until going to college.

Bowie was a sophomore in college when his father died suddenly, aged 45, when a cyst on his lung burst. Of his father Ben, after he died, Bowie said, "We loved each other more than two individuals could. But we never could say, 'I love you.' Neither of us was that kind of person. That's the thing I'm most sorry about, that I didn't get to tell him I loved him before he was gone."

== High school career ==
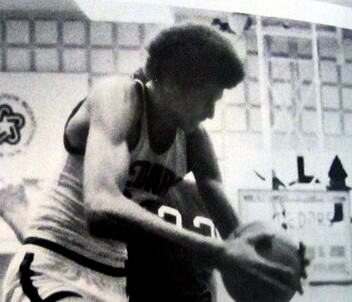
Sam Bowie, All-American at Kentucky and 10-season NBA veteran.

Bowie attended Lebanon High School in Lebanon, Pennsylvania. He played on its basketball team under Coach Chick Hess. Hess later said of Bowie, "He's a father. He's responsible. He's got a head on his shoulder. He just doesn't have two legs that are serving him well. He adjusted to the big-time world. He grew up with blue-collar people who knew what it was like to work for a living. We're all proud of him. He got what he could out of playing pro sports."

A star player, Bowie was heavily recruited. He averaged over 28 points and 18 rebounds per game, and was a McDonald's and Parade All-American. As a junior, he led the Cedars to the state finals, where they lost by a point to Schenley High School of Pittsburgh, 51–50. "When I say this, I mean it with all my heart, from the Kentucky experience to all of my years in pro ball, when I reminisce I go back to my Lebanon Cedar days," said Bowie in 2018. "I just wish we could've won that state championship game. Fifty-one to fifty, we were so close."

Bowie was named national player of the year in 1979. He received the honor over Harrisonburg, Virginia's Ralph Sampson, another highly recruited center. Sampson and Bowie played in the annual Capital Classic all-star game, which was dubbed the "Battle of the Giants" Played at the Capital Centre, the game featured the best players in the Washington, D.C. area playing against an all-star squad composed of players from across the United States.

In February 1979, a Sports Illustrated magazine article feature focused on Bowie, Sampson and Steve Stipanovich as the best high school centers.

Bowie played in the 1979 McDonald's All-American Game. The memorable rosters included: Antoine Carr, Quintin Dailey, Sidney Green, Clark Kellogg, Greg Kite, Sidney Lowe, John Paxson, Ralph Sampson, Byron Scott, Steve Stipanovich, Isiah Thomas, Dereck Whittenburg, Dominique Wilkins and James Worthy.

== College career (1979–1984) ==
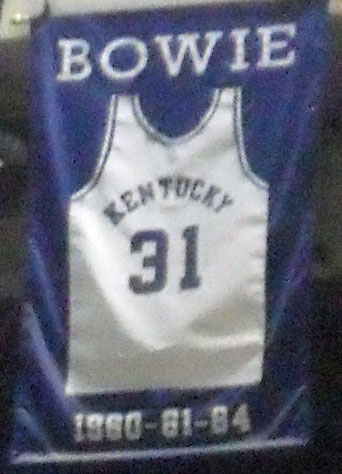
Bowie's #31 jersey was retired by the University of Kentucky. This banner in Rupp Arena honors him.

Bowie signed to play for the University of Kentucky, under Coach Joe B. Hall, in 1979.

=== Freshman season (1979–1980) ===
As a freshman during the 1979–80 season at Kentucky, Bowie averaged 6.9 points, 9.6 rebounds and 2.1 blocks per game. Kentucky finished 29–6 and advanced to the 1980 NCAA tournament. Bowie had 13 points, 11 rebounds and 3 blocks in Kentucky's 97–78 victory over Florida State. He played nine minutes, fouling out with 2 points and 3 rebounds in a 55–54 loss to Duke.

=== Sophomore season (1980–1981) ===
Bowie's sophomore season saw him average 17.5 points, 9.1 rebounds, and 2.9 blocks per game. He was named a third-team NCAA Basketball All-American by the Associated Press. In 1981, he set, and now shares, the Kentucky record for most blocked shots in a game, with nine against St. John's.

However, Bowie began sustaining injuries that would plague the remainder of his basketball career. In the third-to-last game of his sophomore season against Vanderbilt, Bowie went up for a dunk but came down off balance. He landed with most of his weight on his left leg, saying that he felt pain but initially tried to play through it. Kentucky qualified for the 48-team 1981 NCAA tournament as the #2 seed in the Mideast Region, with a first-round bye. In the Wildcats' first game of the tournament, against #7 seed Alabama-Birmingham, Bowie fouled out, playing 21 minutes, as Kentucky was eliminated by UAB 69–62.

=== Injuries (1981–1983) ===
During the 1980–81 season, unbeknownst to Bowie at the time, he had suffered an injury to his leg. He only got it checked after he had been suffering from significant pain in left lower leg. Originally thought to be shin splints, X-rays determined that Bowie had suffered a stress fracture in his left tibia and had been playing on it for much of the time. The injury required surgery and cost Bowie his 1981–82 season, and he was in a cast for 44 weeks. Unfortunately for him, an examination after the cast was removed determined the fracture had not healed properly and Bowie was forced to undergo bone graft surgery: as a result of that surgery, he missed the entire 1982–83 season as well. After not having played in two years, Bowie was now out of collegiate eligibility and needed a medical redshirt from the NCAA to continue playing; this enabled him to return for a final season in 1983–84.

=== Senior season (1983–1984) ===
Bowie returned for the 1983–84 season. Having not played in two years, he played in all 34 Kentucky games and averaged 10.5 points, 9.2 rebounds, and 1.9 blocks. He was named to the Associated Press second-team All-American team. During his senior season, his heroics in a game against rival Louisville earned him a spot on the cover of Sports Illustrated. Bowie, along with fellow "Twin Tower" Melvin Turpin (as the Kentucky frontcourt duo was called), and Kenny Walker led Kentucky to the SEC championship, the SEC Tournament Championship, a top-three national ranking, and a 26–4 season record.

In the 1984 NCAA tournament, the Wildcats defeated Brigham Young 93–68, in-state rival Louisville 72–67 and Illinois 54–51 to advance to the Final Four in Seattle. Bowie had 16 points and 6 rebounds against BYU, 8 points, 12 rebounds and 3 blocks against Louisville and 11 points and 14 rebounds against Illinois.

In the Final Four, Kentucky met eventual NCAA Champion Georgetown, with Patrick Ewing in the semi-finals. Kentucky led at the half, but Georgetown defeated the Wildcats 53–40, ending Bowie's college career. Bowie had 10 points, 11 rebounds and two blocks in the loss. Ewing had 8 points and 9 rebounds with 0 blocks.

In 96 career games at Kentucky, Bowie averaged 13.4 points, 8.8 rebounds, 2.3 blocks and 1.4 assists on 69.9% shooting. Bowie played 3 seasons in five years.

== 1980 Olympic team ==
In the summer of 1980, Bowie was selected for the United States Olympic men's basketball team. The 1980 United States Olympic team was coached by Dave Gavitt and assisted by Larry Brown. The 1980 US team was the youngest American national team ever assembled. Alongside Bowie were team members Mark Aguirre, Rolando Blackman, Michael Brooks, Bill Hanzlik, Alton Lister, Rodney McCray, Isiah Thomas, Darnell Valentine, Danny Vranes, Buck Williams and Al Wood.

The Soviet invasion of Afghanistan caused the United States and 66 other countries to boycott the 1980 Summer Olympics in Moscow. Unable to compete in the Olympics due to the boycott, Team USA played a series of games against NBA all-star teams in various US cities, ending with a 5–1 record. The games were labeled the "Gold Medal Series". In the six games against NBA All-Stars, Bowie was Team USA's second-leading scorer and leading rebounder and shot-blocker, averaging 11.6 points, 6.9 rebounds, and 2.3 blocks. Bowie was 19 years old while playing on Team USA.

Many years later, he received one of 461 Congressional Gold Medals created especially for the 1980 athletes.

== NBA career ==
=== 1984 NBA draft ===
Entering the 1984 NBA draft, although the Houston Rockets had tied with the Indiana Pacers for the NBA's worst record, the Pacers had traded the top pick to the Portland Trail Blazers in 1981 for center Tom Owens. In 1984, having beat the Blazers in a coin toss for first pick, the Rockets chose Houston center Hakeem Olajuwon. Unable to choose him, yet still seeking a center, the Blazers chose Bowie. Choosing third, the Chicago Bulls then drafted North Carolina shooting guard Michael Jordan.

At the time, picking Bowie made sense from the Blazers' perspective. The team had not had a solid big man since Bill Walton, one of its first major stars, left in 1979. Soon before the draft, the NBA fined the Blazers $250,000 (equivalent of $770,000 in 2018) for improper contact with Olajuwon and center Patrick Ewing. A year earlier, Portland had drafted a shooting guard, Olajuwon's college teammate Clyde Drexler. Having both Drexler and Jim Paxson, the Blazers had little need on paper for another shooting guard. Still, in 2005, highlighting Bowie's injury-laden college career, ESPN named the Blazers' choice the worst draft pick in the history of North American professional sports. Also that year, arguing that teams should draft for talent and not need, Sports Illustrated named Bowie the biggest draft bust in NBA history.

=== Portland Trail Blazers (1984–1989) ===
During his rookie season, Bowie played in 76 games and averaged 10 points and 8.6 rebounds, earning a spot on the NBA All-Rookie Team. However, in his second season, Bowie's leg injuries recurred. During a game against the Milwaukee Bucks at The MECCA, Bowie and teammate Jerome Kersey became entangled going for a rebound, and as they landed, Bowie's left tibia broke. He was carried off the floor on a stretcher.

"I firmly believe I can be one of the top centers in the league if I'm healthy," said Bowie. "One year, things are going to fall into place, and I'm going to show people how good I can be."

The next season, Bowie returned. In the season's fifth game against the Dallas Mavericks, Bowie went up for a jump hook shot. As he went up, his legs buckled underneath him and Bowie fell to the floor. He suffered a season-ending fracture of his right tibia. Bowie compared the feeling having his leg chopped by an ax. "It was not a pretty sight," Portland teammate Clyde Drexler recalled. "He went to make a move, fell, and threw the ball down hard off the court. I remember seeing part of the bone sticking out of his leg and how he was beating the floor over and over with his fist."

Bowie's subsequent surgery utilized three screws being placed in the bone to keep it together. However, two screws did not hold, so another operation was needed to put in three new screws.

Once again, Bowie came back to play. On October 17, 1987, during pregame warmups for a preseason game with the Cleveland Cavaliers, Bowie began feeling intense pain in his right leg just walking. Not wanting a stretcher, Bowie was carried off the court by his teammates and was diagnosed with a hairline fracture of his right tibia. On March 29, 1988, Bowie had surgery where he received a graft from his hip bone and had a metal plate with 10 screws permanently attached to his right shin. The injury effectively sidelined him for the next two seasons; he missed all of the 1987–88 season, as well as the first 62 games of the 1988–89 season. All told, Bowie played 63 games out of a possible 328 during his last four seasons in Portland.

"I have one huge regret," said Bowie. "I wish I would've been more patient and didn't come back as quickly as I did the second year I fractured my leg. You feel like you disappointed Portland. You're getting paid a lot of money and you can't play. I don't know if it's guilt or regret. But I've never been one to say, 'Why me?'. I feel I should have an MD behind my name from all the education I've received from my own cases."

=== New Jersey Nets (1989–1993) ===
On June 24, 1989, Bowie, who had averaged 10.5 points per game with the Trail Blazers, was traded, along with a draft pick, to the New Jersey Nets in exchange for Buck Williams.

Bowie's four seasons in New Jersey were his most productive, as he had no major injuries. Bowie averaged 12.8 points and 8.2 rebounds per game and never missed more than 20 games in a season. His best season was his first with the Nets where he averaged a double-double with 14.7 points and 10.1 rebounds per game. Bowie also hit a career-high in points per game in 1991–92 with 15.0 and played a career-high 79 games in 1992–93 averaging 9.1 points per game and seven rebounds.

"My main objective is to play the game for the fun of it and the love of it," said Bowie, "Every time I go off the court, I'm thankful I didn't get hurt again. I think too many people take their health for granted.

A 2013 Bleacher Report article listed Bowie as the 17th greatest Nets player up till that point.

=== Los Angeles Lakers (1993–1995) ===
After the 1992–93 season, Bowie was traded for Benoit Benjamin, being sent from New Jersey to the Los Angeles Lakers. However, Bowie's leg injury problems recurred. Bowie played in 92 games in the two seasons combined, starting in 17 of them. Although Jerry West, the team's general manager, wanted Bowie to continue to play for the Lakers, Bowie decided to retire from professional basketball after the 1994–95 season. He desired to follow his passion and become involved in harness racing.

=== Career overview ===
Bowie, Bill Walton, and Greg Oden are frequently cited together. All three were centers, drafted high by Portland, who failed to achieve their potential due to career-altering injuries.

"You know, I go speak and visit at hospitals a lot—and not to sound mushy—but I've seen 7-, 8-, 9-year-old kids who have had their legs amputated because of bone cancer or a car accident," Bowie said. "That's when it puts things into perspective. There's a kid who wishes he had a leg to break. That's when I realize how lucky I am. I can't complain about the hand I've been dealt. Sure, I've had my share of surgery and broken bones, but these things were meant to be. I'm a Christian and I've always felt that tomorrow is predetermined and that you will never be put through more than you can handle."

Over his NBA career, Bowie averaged 10.9 points, 7.5 rebounds and 1.78 blocks per game. He hit 45.2% of his attempted field goals (2,127 made of 4,702 attempted), and 30.2% of his three-point shots (32 made of 106 attempted).

== Post-basketball endeavors ==
For a time, Bowie performed color commentary for University of Kentucky Basketball.

After he retired from basketball, Bowie returned to Lexington, Kentucky. Bowie is involved in harness racing, both owning and training horses that run at The Red Mile in Lexington.

== Personal life ==
Bowie has been married twice. He has three now-grown children. "I was blessed in the sense that I was able to be a full-time father." Bowie said.

Bowie married Stephanie Bowie in April 2018 in La Fortuna, Costa Rica.

In 2012, Bowie was featured in an ESPN SEC Storied documentary, Going Big. In it, he admitted hiding the extent of his leg troubles from the Blazers. For instance, he said that when a doctor tapped his left tibia with a mallet, he claimed not to feel anything when he was actually in noticeable pain. He developed leg trouble as early as high school; film from the late 1970s shows him struggling to avoid undue strain on his legs and feet.

== Honors ==
- Bowie was inducted into the University of Kentucky Athletics Hall of Fame in 2005.
- Bowie's number 31 was retired by Kentucky Basketball in 2002.

== Career statistics ==
Legend
GP	Games played	GS	Games started	MPG	Minutes per game
FG%	Field goal percentage	3P%	3-point field goal percentage	FT%	Free throw percentage
RPG	Rebounds per game	APG	Assists per game	SPG	Steals per game
BPG	Blocks per game	PPG	Points per game	**Bold**	Career high

=== NBA ===
==== Regular season ====
Year	Team	GP	GS	MPG	FG%	3P%	FT%	RPG	APG	SPG	BPG	PPG
1984–85	Portland	76	62	29.2	**.537**	.000	.711	8.6	**2.8**	**.7**	**2.7**	10.0
1985–86	Portland	38	34	29.8	.484	.000	.708	8.6	2.6	.6	2.5	11.8
1986–87	Portland	5	5	**32.6**	.455	.000	.667	6.6	1.8	.2	2.0	**16.0**
1988–89	Portland	20	0	20.6	.451	**.714**	.571	5.3	1.8	.4	1.7	8.6
1989–90	New Jersey	68	54	32.5	.416	.323	.776	**10.1**	1.3	.6	1.8	14.7
1990–91	New Jersey	62	51	30.9	.434	.182	.732	7.7	2.4	**.7**	1.5	12.9
1991–92	New Jersey	71	61	30.7	.445	.320	.757	8.1	2.6	.6	1.7	15.0
1992–93	New Jersey	**79**	**65**	26.5	.450	.333	.779	7.0	1.6	.4	1.6	9.1
1993–94	L.A. Lakers	25	7	22.2	.436	.250	**.867**	5.2	1.9	.2	1.1	8.9
1994–95	L.A. Lakers	67	10	18.3	.442	.182	.764	4.3	1.8	.3	1.2	4.6
Career		511	349	27.6	.452	.302	.748	7.5	2.1	.5	1.8	10.9

==== Playoffs ====
Year	Team	GP	GS	MPG	FG%	3P%	FT%	RPG	APG	SPG	BPG	PPG
1985	Portland	9	**9**	**28.8**	.441	.000	.560	**8.4**	**2.3**	.4	**2.3**	7.3
1989	Portland	3	1	22.3	.429	**.500**	.750	6.7	1.0	.2	**2.3**	**10.3**
1992	New Jersey	4	4	28.0	.424	**.500**	.667	4.8	**2.3**	.8	.8	9.3
1993	New Jersey	3	3	23.7	**.444**	.000	**1.000**	4.0	.7	**2.0**	.3	3.3
1995	L.A. Lakers	**10**	0	13.5	.267	.000	**1.000**	3.3	.3	.1	.9	2.1
Career		29	17	22.2	.403	.500	.673	5.5	1.3	.5	1.4	5.7

=== College ===
Year	Team	GP	GS	MPG	FG%	3P%	FT%	RPG	APG	SPG	BPG	PPG
1979–80	Kentucky	**34**	—	26.1	**.531**	—	**.764**	8.1	.8	.4	2.1	12.9
1980–81	Kentucky	28	—	**32.0**	.520	—	.720	9.1	1.4	**.6**	**2.9**	**17.4**
1983–84	Kentucky	**34**	—	28.8	.516	—	.722	**9.2**	**1.9**	**.6**	1.9	10.5
Career		96	—	28.8	.522	—	.735	8.8	1.4	.5	2.3	13.4
