= Tom Sewell (basketball) =

American basketball player

Personal information
- Born: March 11, 1962 (age 64) Pensacola, Florida, U.S.
- Listed height: 6 ft 5 in (1.96 m)
- Listed weight: 185 lb (84 kg)

Career information
- High school: Booker T. Washington (Pensacola, Florida)
- College: Amarillo College (1980–1981); Lamar (1981–1984)
- NBA draft: 1984: 1st round, 22nd overall pick
- Drafted by: Philadelphia 76ers
- Playing career: 1984–1993
- Position: Shooting guard
- Number: 32

Career history
- 1984–1985: Washington Bullets
- 1985–1986: Wyoming Wildcatters
- 1985–1986: Detroit Spirits
- 1988–1989: Panathinaikos BC
- 1989–1990: Grand Rapids Hoops
- 1992–1993: VGNN Donar

Career highlights
- Southland Player of the Year (1984); 2× First-team All-Southland (1983, 1984)
- Stats at NBA.com
- Stats at Basketball Reference

Tom Sewell (born March 11, 1962) is an American former professional basketball player. He played in the National Basketball Association (NBA) for the Washington Bullets during the 1984–85 season.

== Biography ==
Born in Pensacola, Florida and a graduate of Booker T. Washington High School, Sewell played collegiately with the Cardinals of Lamar University for three years, averaging 22.9 points per game as a junior.

Sewell was selected by the Philadelphia 76ers with the 22nd overall pick in the 1984 NBA draft. The 76ers, eager to offer a long-term deal to Charles Barkley (whom they had selected with the #5 pick they had previously obtained from the San Diego/Los Angeles Clippers) immediately traded Sewell to the Washington Bullets for a 1988 pick (which was later traded back to the Bullets who used it to select Harvey Grant).

Sewell played one season for the Bullets, recording 20 points, 6 assists, 4 rebounds, 3 steals, and 1 block over 21 games.

He now coaches the school basketball team Ark Putney in London, England and referees the u14 and u16 basketball games.

== Career statistics ==
Legend
GP	Games played	GS	Games started	MPG	Minutes per game
FG%	Field goal percentage	3P%	3-point field goal percentage	FT%	Free throw percentage
RPG	Rebounds per game	APG	Assists per game	SPG	Steals per game
BPG	Blocks per game	PPG	Points per game	**Bold**	Career high

=== NBA ===
==== Regular season ====
Year	Team	GP	GS	MPG	FG%	3P%	FT%	RPG	APG	SPG	BPG	PPG
1984–85	Washington	21	0	4.1	.250	.000	.500	.2	.3	.1	.0	1.0
