= Charlie Sitton =

American basketball player (born 1962)

Personal information
- Born: July 3, 1962 (age 64) McMinnville, Oregon, U.S.
- Listed height: 6 ft 8 in (2.03 m)
- Listed weight: 210 lb (95 kg)

Career information
- High school: McMinnville (McMinnville, Oregon)
- College: Oregon State (1980–1984)
- NBA draft: 1984: 2nd round, 38th overall pick
- Drafted by: Dallas Mavericks
- Playing career: 1984–1989
- Position: Small forward
- Number: 52

Career history
- 1984–1985: Dallas Mavericks
- 1986–1988: Basket Brescia
- 1988–1989: Hitachi Venezia

Career highlights
- Third-team All-American – NABC (1984); 3× First-team All-Pac-10 (1982–1984); McDonald's All-American (1980); First-team Parade All-American (1980); Second-team Parade All-American (1979)
- Stats at NBA.com
- Stats at Basketball Reference
Medals
Men's basketball
Representing United States
Pan American Games
Gold medal – first place	1983 Caracas	Team competition

Charles E. Sitton (born July 3, 1962) is an American former professional basketball player. He played two seasons in the National Basketball Association (NBA) with the Dallas Mavericks, who selected him in the second round of the 1984 NBA draft. He went on to play in Europe.

Sitton played college basketball for the Oregon State Beavers. He was a three-time all-conference selection in the Pacific-10 (now known as the Pac-12) and was an All-American as a senior. He helped lead the Beavers to three NCAA tournament appearances.

== Oregon State career ==
A 6' 8" forward, he played high school basketball at McMinnville High School and college basketball for Oregon State from 1981 to 1984. As a freshman, Sitton was a member of the last Oregon State team to achieve a number 1 ranking in 1981. He was a two-time All-American and three-time All-Pac-10 selection, and was chosen as Oregon State's MVP in 1983. In Sitton's four years at Oregon State, the Beavers were 93-25 and appeared in the NCAA tournament three times and the NIT once. Sitton scored 1,561 points in his college career, and shot at a .575 field goal percentage.

== After college ==
Sitton was drafted by the Dallas Mavericks in the second round of the 1984 NBA draft and played one season for the Mavericks before continuing his career in Europe. He was named to both the Oregon Sports Hall of Fame and the OSU Athletic Hall of Fame in 1997.

== Career statistics ==
Legend
GP	Games played	GS	Games started	MPG	Minutes per game
FG%	Field goal percentage	3P%	3-point field goal percentage	FT%	Free throw percentage
RPG	Rebounds per game	APG	Assists per game	SPG	Steals per game
BPG	Blocks per game	PPG	Points per game	**Bold**	Career high

=== NBA ===
==== Regular season ====
Year	Team	GP	GS	MPG	FG%	3P%	FT%	RPG	APG	SPG	BPG	PPG
1984–85	Dallas	43	0	7.1	.415	.000	.520	1.4	.6	.2	.1	2.1
