= Devin Durrant =

American basketball player (born 1960)

Personal information
- Born: October 20, 1960 (age 66) Brigham City, Utah, U.S.
- Listed height: 6 ft 7 in (2.01 m)
- Listed weight: 200 lb (91 kg)

Career information
- High school: Provo (Provo, Utah)
- College: BYU (1978–1980, 1982–1984)
- NBA draft: 1984: 2nd round, 25th overall pick
- Drafted by: Indiana Pacers
- Playing career: 1984–1989
- Position: Small forward
- Number: 7, 17

Career history
- 1984–1985: Indiana Pacers
- 1985: Phoenix Suns
- 1988–1989: Olympique Antibes

Career highlights
- Consensus second-team All-American (1984); WAC Player of the Year (1983); 2× First-team All-WAC (1983, 1984); McDonald's All-American (1978)
- Stats at NBA.com
- Stats at Basketball Reference

Devin George Durrant (born October 20, 1960) is an American former professional basketball player. From 1984 to 1985 he played with the Indiana Pacers and with the Phoenix Suns. He later played in European basketball leagues until 1988. In a Deseret News poll in the year 2000, he was voted one of the top 10 college basketball players in the state of Utah over the previous 100 years. In 1999, Sports Illustrated listed him as one of the 50 greatest Utah sports figures.

Durrant has also served in various roles in the Church of Jesus Christ of Latter-day Saints (LDS Church), including president of the Texas Dallas Mission and as a counselor in the church's Sunday School general presidency.

== Early life and college ==
Born in Brigham City, Utah, Durrant was named a McDonald's All-American in 1978 during his senior year of high school. He was captain of the Provo High School team that won a state basketball championship.

Durrant attended Brigham Young University (BYU) where he played basketball and started every game of his collegiate basketball career. He helped the Cougars to three NCAA postseason berths, three WAC championships, and an overall record of 79–38. During his senior year, Durrant averaged 27.9 points per game, good for third in the nation. For his efforts, he was named second-team All-American by the AP, NABC, and USBWA. He graduated from BYU in 1984.

== Professional basketball career ==
In 1984, Durrant was named District 7 Player of the Year and a consensus All-American. That same year he was selected as a GTE/CoSida Academic All-American for the second time and awarded an NCAA postgraduate scholarship. Durrant was chosen by the Indiana Pacers as the 25th pick in the NBA draft. He played a season with the Pacers and part of a second season with the Phoenix Suns. He also played professionally in Spain (in the teams Santa Coloma and Guadalajara) and France.

After leaving professional basketball in 1988, Durrant worked as a marketing director with WordPerfect Corporation. He subsequently owned his own real estate investment firm. In 2009, he earned an MBA from the University of Utah.

In 2016, Durrant was inducted into the Utah Sports Hall of Fame. He remains No. 5 on BYU's career scoring list with 2,285 points.

== LDS Church service ==
Durrant is a member of the LDS Church and has served in a variety of positions, including bishop, counselor in a stake presidency, high councilor, and stake mission president. As a young man, Durrant served as a full-time missionary in the church's Spain Madrid Mission. From 2011 to 2014, he served as president of the church's Texas Dallas Mission.

At the church's April 2014 General Conference, while still serving as a mission president in Texas, Durrant was accepted by the membership as second counselor to Tad R. Callister in the church's Sunday School General Presidency. Durrant completed his service in Texas and officially began the Sunday School assignment in July 2014. In May 2015, the LDS Church announced that John S. Tanner, who was serving as the first counselor in the Sunday School General Presidency, had been appointed as the next president of Brigham Young University-Hawaii. As a result, in June 2015 Durrant was called as first counselor, with Brian K. Ashton succeeding Durrant as second counselor.

Durrant has spoken three times in the church's general conference. The first was in April 1984, just after completing his playing career at BYU, where he spoke on the topic of missionary work. He spoke again in the October 2015 General Conference, while serving in the Sunday School General Presidency, in a talk where he encouraged listeners to "ponderize" (a portmanteau of "ponder" and "memorize") passages from scripture. The message received media attention following the discovery of his son's website that sold shirts encouraging people to share the verses of scripture that they were ponderizing; Durrant subsequently issued an apology regarding the site as the media attention changed the intended focus of ponderizing weekly to "always remember Him”. He spoke again in April 2018 about teaching families in the homes in a Christ-like manner.

== Writing career ==
Durrant has written three books. The books are titled, in order of release: Raising an All-American: Helping Your Child Succeed in Athletics and in Life, Becoming an All-American, and The Values Delta: A Small and Simple Way to Make a Positive Difference in Your Personal and Professional Life.

== Personal life ==
Durrant's parents are George and Marilyn Durrant. Durrant and his wife, Julie, are the parents of six children.

== Career statistics ==
Legend
GP	Games played	GS	Games started	MPG	Minutes per game
FG%	Field goal percentage	3P%	3-point field goal percentage	FT%	Free throw percentage
RPG	Rebounds per game	APG	Assists per game	SPG	Steals per game
BPG	Blocks per game	PPG	Points per game	**Bold**	Career high

=== NBA ===
==== Regular season ====
Year	Team	GP	GS	MPG	FG%	3P%	FT%	RPG	APG	SPG	BPG	PPG
1984–85	Indiana	**59**	**8**	**12.8**	**.416**	.000	**.706**	**2.1**	**1.4**	.3	**.2**	**5.1**
1985–86	Phoenix	4	0	**12.8**	.381	–	.250	2.0	1.3	**.8**	.0	4.3
Career		63	0	8.3	.414	.000	.689	2.1	1.3	.3	.2	5.0
