= Cory Blackwell =

American basketball player (born 1963)

Personal information
- Born: March 27, 1963 (age 62) Chicago, Illinois, U.S.
- Listed height: 6 ft 6 in (1.98 m)
- Listed weight: 210 lb (95 kg)

Career information
- High school: Crane (Chicago, Illinois)
- College: Wisconsin (1981–1984)
- NBA draft: 1984: 2nd round, 28th overall pick
- Drafted by: Seattle SuperSonics
- Position: Small forward
- Number: 30

Career history
- 1984–1985: Seattle SuperSonics
- 1985–1986: Olympique Antibes
- 1986–1987: Fenerbahçe
- 1987–1988: NMKY Helsinki/Sornaisten
- Stats at NBA.com
- Stats at Basketball Reference

Cory Blackwell (born March 27, 1963) is an American former professional basketball player who was selected by the Seattle SuperSonics in the second round (28th pick overall) of the 1984 NBA draft.

== Basketball career ==
After playing college basketball for the University of Wisconsin, Blackwell played one NBA season for the Seattle SuperSonics, appearing in 60 games and scoring a total of 202 points in 1984–85. He subsequently played in Turkey, France, Italy, Spain and Finland. After a brief spell with the Golden State Warriors, he retired in 1989.

== Ministry ==
With Kip McKean, Blackwell founded the Cross and Switchblade Ministry in Los Angeles. In 1994, he was made the ICOC's World Sector Leader of the Middle East. In 2010, he joined the International Christian Church. As of January 2026, he is Lead Evangelist at the New York International Christian Church.

== Personal life ==
Blackwell was born in Chicago. He was raised Sunni Muslim by his mother, Wazirah. Blackwell was baptized into the International Church of Christ (ICOC) in Chicago in 1990. His first wife was professional model Megan, with whom he had four children. He and Megan were divorced in 2002. In 2013, he married his second wife, Jee.

== Career statistics ==
Legend
GP	Games played	GS	Games started	MPG	Minutes per game
FG%	Field goal percentage	3P%	3-point field goal percentage	FT%	Free throw percentage
RPG	Rebounds per game	APG	Assists per game	SPG	Steals per game
BPG	Blocks per game	PPG	Points per game	**Bold**	Career high

=== NBA ===
==== Regular season ====
Year	Team	GP	GS	MPG	FG%	3P%	FT%	RPG	APG	SPG	BPG	PPG
1984–85	Seattle	60	0	9.2	.367	.000	.509	1.6	.4	.4	.1	3.4
