= Melvin Turpin =

American basketball player (1960–2010)

Personal information
- Born: December 28, 1960 Lexington, Kentucky, U.S.
- Died: July 8, 2010 (aged 49) Lexington, Kentucky, U.S.
- Listed height: 6 ft 11 in (2.11 m)
- Listed weight: 240 lb (109 kg)

Career information
- High school: Bryan Station (Lexington, Kentucky)
- College: Kentucky (1980–1984)
- NBA draft: 1984: 1st round, 6th overall pick
- Drafted by: Washington Bullets
- Playing career: 1984–1990
- Position: Center
- Number: 54, 50

Career history
- 1984–1987: Cleveland Cavaliers
- 1987–1988: Utah Jazz
- 1988–1989: Zaragoza
- 1989–1990: Washington Bullets

Career highlights
- Consensus second-team All-American (1984); 2× First-team All-SEC (1983, 1984)

Career NBA statistics
- Points: 3,071 (8.5 ppg)
- Rebounds: 1,655 (4.6 rpg)
- Blocks: 348 (1.0 bpg)
- Stats at NBA.com
- Stats at Basketball Reference

Melvin Harrison Turpin (December 28, 1960 – July 8, 2010) was an American professional basketball player. He played five seasons in the National Basketball Association (NBA). He was an All-American college player at the University of Kentucky, where as a senior he led the Wildcats to the 1984 Final Four.

== Basketball career ==
=== Student athlete ===
A 6'11" center, Turpin was born in Lexington, Kentucky and attended Fork Union Military Academy in Fork Union, Virginia from 1979 to 1980. He was FUMA's most valuable player for the postgraduate squad under coach Fletcher Arritt, also being voted the number one player in the state for varsity basketball; he averaged 19 points, 12 rebounds and six blocked shots, being inducted into the Fork Union Military Academy Hall of Fame in 2000.

At the University of Kentucky, Turpin made the 1st Team All-SEC for 1982 and 1983 and was a starter for the NCAA Final Four Kentucky Wildcats team in 1983–84. In 1984, he was the Southeastern Conference scoring leader, holding the record for the most field goals made in SEC tournament play in addition to co-holding the honor of the most points scored in a single tournament game. Turpin scored 42 points in a game against University of Tennessee as a junior, making 18 of 22 shots from the field; he similarly dominated Louisiana State University as a senior, shooting 15 of 17 from the floor and five of six from the free throw line.

=== Professional career ===
In 1984, Turpin was chosen as the sixth overall pick in the first round by the Washington Bullets in the NBA draft, being immediately traded to the Cleveland Cavaliers. As a professional, however, he struggled with his weight, and after six seasons with the Cavaliers, the Utah Jazz, CAI Zaragoza and the Bullets, he retired. Earning the derisive nicknames "Dinner Bell Mel" and "the Mealman", Turpin was considered one of the biggest busts in a draft class that included future greats such as Hakeem Olajuwon, Michael Jordan, Charles Barkley and John Stockton. In a 2004 Sports Illustrated article, Turpin quipped, "In my day, they thought the big man was supposed to be thin. They didn't know too much. It was medieval".

During his National Basketball Association spell, 361 regular season games brought him averages of 8 points and nearly 5 rebounds. In 1988–89, before his last season altogether, he played in Spain with CAI Zaragoza, later being exchanged to the Jazz for José Ortiz.

== Career statistics ==
Legend
GP	Games played	GS	Games started	MPG	Minutes per game
FG%	Field goal percentage	3P%	3-point field goal percentage	FT%	Free throw percentage
RPG	Rebounds per game	APG	Assists per game	SPG	Steals per game
BPG	Blocks per game	PPG	Points per game	**Bold**	Career high

=== NBA ===
==== Regular season ====
Year	Team	GP	GS	MPG	FG%	3P%	FT%	RPG	APG	SPG	BPG	PPG
1984–85	Cleveland	79	45	24.7	.511	.000	.784	5.7	.5	.5	1.1	10.6
1985–86	Cleveland	**80**	**69**	**28.7**	**.544**	.000	**.811**	**7.0**	**.7**	**.8**	**1.3**	**13.7**
1986–87	Cleveland	64	1	12.5	.462	.000	.714	3.0	.5	.2	.6	6.1
1987–88	Utah	79	0	12.8	.512	.000	.724	3.0	.4	.3	.9	5.9
1989–90	Washington	59	12	13.9	.526	.**333**	.789	3.7	.5	.3	.8	4.7
Career		361	127	19.0	.516	.000	.777	4.6	.5	.4	1.0	8.5

==== Playoffs ====
Year	Team	GP	GS	MPG	FG%	3P%	FT%	RPG	APG	SPG	BPG	PPG
1984–85	Cleveland	4	0	**11.3**	**.632**	.000	.500	**2.0**	.0	**1.0**	.3	**6.3**
1987–88	Utah	**7**	0	4.4	.333	.000	**1.000**	.9	.3	**.1**	**.6**	1.1
Career		11	0	6.9	.536	.000	.750	1.3	.2	.5	.5	3.0

== Death ==
During the 2000s, Turpin worked as a security guard. On July 8, 2010, he died by suicide in his Lexington home from an apparent self-inflicted gunshot wound. The reason for his suicide was never determined, and it was never made public if he left a suicide note. He was 49 years old at the time of his death.
