= Pac-12 Conference Hall of Honor =

Athletic Hall of Honor

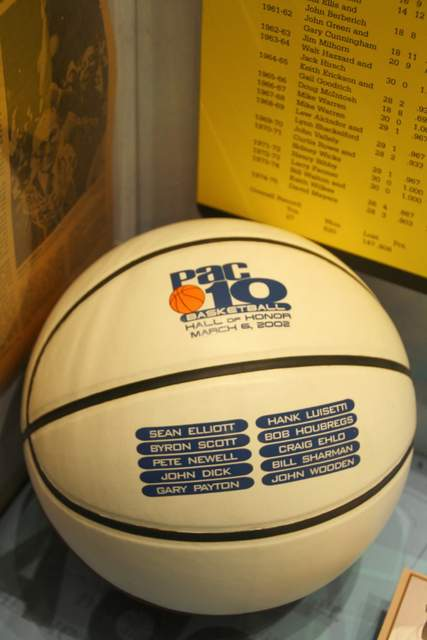
Basketball commemorating 2002 Hall of Honor inductees

The Pac-12 Conference Hall of Honor recognizes former athletes and coaches who have made a significant impact to the tradition and heritage of the Pac-12 Conference. Established in 2002, one honoree is selected by each member institution in the conference annually. The inductions occur during the Pac-12 Conference men's basketball tournament. The Hall of Honor was originally limited to men's basketball, until it was opened to other sports in 2018. The conference was named the Pacific-10 before it expanded in the 2011–12 season with Colorado and Utah.

Year	Name	School	Sport	Ref
2002	Sean Elliott	Arizona	Men's basketball	
2002	Byron Scott	Arizona State	Men's basketball	
2002	Pete Newell	California	Men's basketball	
2002	John Dick	Oregon	Men's basketball	
2002	Gary Payton	Oregon State	Men's basketball	
2002	Hank Luisetti	Stanford	Men's basketball	
2002	John Wooden	UCLA	Men's basketball	
2002	Bill Sharman	USC	Men's basketball	
2002	Bob Houbregs	Washington	Men's basketball	
2002	Craig Ehlo	Washington State	Men's basketball	
2003	Steve Kerr	Arizona	Men's basketball	
2003	Ned Wulk	Arizona State	Men's basketball	
2003	Kevin Johnson	California	Men's basketball	
2003	Howard Hobson	Oregon	Men's basketball	
2003	Slats Gill	Oregon State	Men's basketball	
2003	Todd Lichti	Stanford	Men's basketball	
2003	Kareem Abdul-Jabbar	UCLA	Men's basketball	
2003	Tex Winter	USC	Men's basketball	
2003	Marv Harshman	Washington	Men's basketball	
2003	Jack Friel	Washington State	Men's basketball	
2004	Khalid Reeves	Arizona	Men's basketball	
2004	Fat Lever	Arizona State	Men's basketball	
2004	Jason Kidd	California	Men's basketball	
2004	Ron Lee	Oregon	Men's basketball	
2004	Mel Counts	Oregon State	Men's basketball	
2004	Howie Dallmar	Stanford	Men's basketball	
2004	Walt Hazzard	UCLA	Men's basketball	
2004	Bob Boyd	USC	Men's basketball	
2004	James Edwards	Washington	Men's basketball	
2004	George Raveling	Washington State	Men's basketball	
2005	Pete Williams	Arizona	Men's basketball	
2005	Joe Caldwell	Arizona State	Men's basketball	
2005	Darrall Imhoff	California	Men's basketball	
2005	Blair Rasmussen	Oregon	Men's basketball	
2005	Ed Lewis	Oregon State	Men's basketball	
2005	Rich Kelley	Stanford	Men's basketball	
2005	Gail Goodrich	UCLA	Men's basketball	
2005	John Rudometkin	USC	Men's basketball	
2005	Jack Nichols	Washington	Men's basketball	
2005	Gene Conley	Washington State	Men's basketball	
2006	Damon Stoudamire	Arizona	Men's basketball	
2006	Lionel Hollins	Arizona State	Men's basketball	
2006	Andy Wolfe	California	Men's basketball	
2006	Jim Loscutoff	Oregon	Men's basketball	
2006	Ralph Miller	Oregon State	Men's basketball	
2006	Adam Keefe	Stanford	Men's basketball	
2006	Don Barksdale	UCLA	Men's basketball	
2006	Mo Layton	USC	Men's basketball	
2006	Steve Hawes	Washington	Men's basketball	
2006	James Donaldson	Washington State	Men's basketball	
2007	Chris Mills	Arizona	Men's basketball	
2007	Eddie House	Arizona State	Men's basketball	
2007	Russ Critchfield	California	Men's basketball	
2007	Dick Harter	Oregon	Men's basketball	
2007	Steve Johnson	Oregon State	Men's basketball	
2007	George Yardley	Stanford	Men's basketball	
2007	Jamaal Wilkes	UCLA	Men's basketball	
2007	Ron Riley	USC	Men's basketball	
2007	Christian Welp	Washington	Men's basketball	
2007	Vince Hanson	Washington State	Men's basketball	
2008	Miles Simon	Arizona	Men's basketball	
2008	Alton Lister	Arizona State	Men's basketball	
2008	Charles Johnson	California	Men's basketball	
2008	Terrell Brandon	Oregon	Men's basketball	
2008	Red Rocha	Oregon State	Men's basketball	
2008	Tom Dose	Stanford	Men's basketball	
2008	Marques Johnson	UCLA	Men's basketball	
2008	Paul Westphal	USC	Men's basketball	
2008	Louie Nelson	Washington	Men's basketball	
2008	Mark Hendrickson	Washington State	Men's basketball	
2009	Lute Olson	Arizona	Men's basketball	
2009	Royce Youree	Arizona State	Men's basketball	
2009	Nibs Price	California	Men's basketball	
2009	Greg Ballard	Oregon	Men's basketball	
2009	Paul Valenti	Oregon State	Men's basketball	
2009	Jim Pollard	Stanford	Men's basketball	
2009	Michael Warren	UCLA	Men's basketball	
2009	Gus Williams	USC	Men's basketball	
2009	Detlef Schrempf	Washington	Men's basketball	
2009	Isaac Fontaine	Washington State	Men's basketball	
2010	Mike Bibby	Arizona	Men's basketball	
2010	Jeremy Veal	Arizona State	Men's basketball	
2010	Earl Robinson	California	Men's basketball	
2010	Kenya Wilkins	Oregon	Men's basketball	
2010	Dave Gambee	Oregon State	Men's basketball	
2010	John Arrillaga	Stanford	Men's basketball	
2010	Reggie Miller	UCLA	Men's basketball	
2010	John Block	USC	Men's basketball	
2010	Eldridge Recasner	Washington	Men's basketball	
2010	Paul Lindemann	Washington State	Men's basketball	
2011	Michael Dickerson	Arizona	Men's basketball	
2011	Isaac Austin	Arizona State	Men's basketball	
2011	Bob McKeen	California	Men's basketball	
2011	Charlie Warren	Oregon	Men's basketball	
2011	Charlie White	Oregon State	Men's basketball	
2011	Brevin Knight	Stanford	Men's basketball	
2011	Don MacLean	UCLA	Men's basketball	
2011	Harold Miner	USC	Men's basketball	
2011	Todd MacCulloch	Washington	Men's basketball	
2011	Ray Sundquist	Washington State	Men's basketball	
2012	Richard Jefferson	Arizona	Men's basketball	
2012	Kurt Nimphius	Arizona State	Men's basketball	
2012	Lamond Murray	California	Men's basketball	
2012	Burdette Haldorson	Colorado	Men's basketball	
2012	Jim Barnett	Oregon	Men's basketball	
2012	A.C. Green	Oregon State	Men's basketball	
2012	George Selleck	Stanford	Men's basketball	
2012	Ed O'Bannon	UCLA	Men's basketball	
2012	Sam Barry	USC	Men's basketball	
2012	Arnie Ferrin	Utah	Men's basketball	
2012	George Irvine	Washington	Men's basketball	
2012	Steve Puidokas	Washington State	Men's basketball	
2013	Jason Gardner	Arizona	Men's basketball	
2013	Dennis Hamilton	Arizona State	Men's basketball	
2013	Shareef Abdur-Rahim	California	Men's basketball	
2013	Cliff Meely	Colorado	Men's basketball	
2013	Chuck Rask	Oregon	Men's basketball	
2013	Charlie Sitton	Oregon State	Men's basketball	
2013	Ron Tomsic	Stanford	Men's basketball	
2013	Lucius Allen	UCLA	Men's basketball	
2013	Forrest Twogood	USC	Men's basketball	
2013	Keith Van Horn	Utah	Men's basketball	
2013	Nate Robinson	Washington	Men's basketball	
2013	Jim McKean	Washington State	Men's basketball	
2014	Luke Walton	Arizona	Men's basketball	
2014	Verl Heap	Arizona State	Men's basketball	
2014	Dave Butler	California	Men's basketball	
2014	Ken Charlton	Colorado	Men's basketball	
2014	Fred Jones	Oregon	Men's basketball	
2014	Lee Harman	Oregon State	Men's basketball	
2014	Mark Madsen	Stanford	Men's basketball	
2014	Tyus Edney	UCLA	Men's basketball	
2014	Wayne Carlander	USC	Men's basketball	
2014	Billy McGill	Utah	Men's basketball	
2014	Brandon Roy	Washington	Men's basketball	
2014	Ed Gayda	Washington State	Men's basketball	
2015	Fred Snowden	Arizona	Men's basketball	
2015	Ron Riley	Arizona State	Men's basketball	
2015	Sean Lampley	California	Men's basketball	
2015	Jim Davis	Colorado	Men's basketball	
2015	Anthony Taylor	Oregon	Men's basketball	
2015	Jim Jarvis	Oregon State	Men's basketball	
2015	Casey Jacobsen	Stanford	Men's basketball	
2015	Dave Meyers	UCLA	Men's basketball	
2015	Alex Hannum	USC	Men's basketball	
2015	Danny Vranes	Utah	Men's basketball	
2015	Jon Brockman	Washington	Men's basketball	
2015	Bennie Seltzer	Washington State	Men's basketball	
2016	Salim Stoudamire	Arizona	Men's basketball	
2016	Art Becker	Arizona State	Men's basketball	
2016	Brian Hendrick	California	Men's basketball	
2016	Scott Wedman	Colorado	Men's basketball	
2016	Luke Ridnour	Oregon	Men's basketball	
2016	Jim Anderson	Oregon State	Men's basketball	
2016	Kim Belton	Stanford	Men's basketball	
2016	Keith Erickson	UCLA	Men's basketball	
2016	Sam Clancy	USC	Men's basketball	
2016	Vern Gardner	Utah	Men's basketball	
2016	Isaiah Thomas	Washington	Men's basketball	
2016	Keith Morrison	Washington State	Men's basketball	
2017	Bob Elliott	Arizona	Men's basketball	
2017	Tarence Wheeler	Arizona State	Men's basketball	
2017	Jerome Randle	California	Men's basketball	
2017	Chauncey Billups	Colorado	Men's basketball	
2017	Stu Jackson	Oregon	Men's basketball	
2017	Ray Blume	Oregon State	Men's basketball	
2017	Mike Montgomery	Stanford	Men's basketball	
2017	David Greenwood	UCLA	Men's basketball	
2017	Ralph Vaughn	USC	Men's basketball	
2017	Andre Miller	Utah	Men's basketball	
2017	Quincy Pondexter	Washington	Men's basketball	
2017	Carlos Daniel	Washington State	Men's basketball	
2018	Michael Wright	Arizona	Men's basketball	
2018	Linda Vollstedt	Arizona State	Women's golf	
2018	Matt Biondi	California	Men's swimming	
2018	Matt Biondi	California	Diving	
2018	Bill Toomey	Colorado	Men's track & field	
2018	Andrew Wheating	Oregon	Men's track & field	
2018	Carol Menken-Schaudt	Oregon State	Women's basketball	
2018	Kerri Walsh Jennings	Stanford	Women's volleyball	
2018	Rafer Johnson	UCLA	Men's track & field	
2018	Rafer Johnson	UCLA	Men's basketball	
2018	Cheryl Miller	USC	Women's basketball	
2018	Missy Marlowe	Utah	Women's gymnastics	
2018	Sonny Sixkiller	Washington	Football	
2018	Laura Lavine	Washington State	Women's track & field	
2019	Meg Ritchie-Stone	Arizona	Women's track & field	
2019	Frank Kush	Arizona State	Football	
2019	Natalie Coughlin	California	Women's swimming	
2019	Natalie Coughlin	California	Diving	
2019	Lisa Van Goor	Colorado	Women's basketball	
2019	Bev Smith	Oregon	Women's basketball	
2019	Dick Fosbury	Oregon State	Men's track & field	
2019	Dick Gould	Stanford	Men's tennis	
2019	Ann Meyers Drysdale	UCLA	Women's basketball	
2019	Ronnie Lott	USC	Football	
2019	Steve Smith Sr.	Utah	Football	
2019	Trish Bostrom	Washington	Women's tennis	
2019	John Olerud	Washington State	Baseball	
2020	Sean Rooks	Arizona	Men's basketball	
2020	Jennifer Azzi	Stanford	Women's basketball	
2020	Melissa Belote Ripley	Arizona State	Swimming	
2020	Jonathan Ogden	UCLA	Football	
2020	Don Bowden	California	Track & field	
2020	Barbara Hedges	USC	Administrator	
2020	Bill Marolt	Colorado	Ski	
2020	Kathy Kreiner-Phillips	Utah	Ski	
2020	Dan Fouts	Oregon	Football	
2020	Lincoln Kennedy	Washington	Football	
2020	Joni Huntley	Oregon State	Track & field	
2020	Jeanne Eggart Helfer	Washington State	Basketball	
2022	Tony Azevedo	Stanford	Water Polo	
2022	Drew Bledsoe	Washington State	Football	
2022	Tom Chambers	Utah	Basketball	
2022	Layshia Clarendon	California	Basketball	
2022	Curley Culp	Arizona State	Wrestling/Football	
2022	Tina Frimpong Ellertson	Washington	Soccer	
2022	English Gardner	Oregon	Track & Field	
2022	Tanya Hughes	Arizona	Track & Field	
2022	Steven Jackson	Oregon State	Football	
2022	Jackie Joyner-Kersee	UCLA	Basketball/Track & Field	
2022	John Naber	USC	Swimming	
2022	Jenny Simpson	Colorado	Cross Country/Track & Field	
2023	Susie Parra	Arizona	Softball	
2023	Jackie Johnson-Powell	Arizona State	Track & Field	
2023	Luella Lilly	California	Women's Athletic Director	
2023	Ceal Barry	Colorado	Basketball	
2023	Janie Takeda Reed	Oregon	Softball	
2023	Mary Budke	Oregon State	Golf	
2023	Jessica Mendoza	Stanford	Softball	
2023	Natalie Williams	UCLA	Basketball	
2023	Barbara Hallquist DeGroot	USC	Tennis	
2023	Kim Gaucher	Utah	Basketball	
2023	Danielle Lawrie	Washington	Softball	
2023	Sarah Silvernail	Washington State	Volleyball	

== See also ==
- National Collegiate Basketball Hall of Fame
