= List of All-Pac-12 Conference men's basketball teams =

The All-Pac-12 men's basketball team is an annual Pac-12 Conference honor bestowed on the best players in the conference following every college basketball season. Pac-12 coaches select a 10-player first team and a five-player second team. There were two five-man teams from 1956 though 1979, followed by one 10-man first team from 1980 through 2008. For one year in 2008, there were three five-man teams selected.

During the final week of the regular season, Pac-12 coaches nominate up to three players from their team to be placed on the ballot for consideration. Coaches submit their votes by the Sunday after the season ends and cannot vote for their own players. Previously, a player needed to be selected on 50 percent of the ballots to be on the team. In the 2006–07 season, only nine players received enough votes to be selected. Ties resulted in extra players being selected in some seasons. Each team member receives an award. Players who are not placed on the first or second teams, but received at least three votes, earn honorable mention. The Pac-12 staff has the right to add to the list of recipients selected by the coaches for recognition.

The Pac-12, as currently chartered, was formed in 1959. However, the league claims the history of the Pacific Coast Conference (PCC), founded in 1915, as its own. After the collapse of the PCC in 1959, five of its members immediately founded the Athletic Association of Western Universities (AAWU). By 1964, all of the final PCC members except Idaho were reunited in the AAWU. The AAWU unofficially used the names Big Five, Big Six, and Pacific-8 before formally adopting the "Pacific-8" name in 1968. The name changed to Pacific-10 when Arizona and Arizona State joined in 1978, and to Pac-12 when Colorado and Utah joined in 2011.

== Selections ==
*	Named Pac-12 Player of the Year that season. Awarded since 1976.
†	Named co-Pac-12 Players of the Year that season.

=== 1916–1919 ===
Season	First team		Ref
Season	Players	Teams	Ref
1915–16	Adolph Sieberts	Oregon State	
1915–16	Jack Davidson	Washington	
1915–16	Dan Foster	California	
1915–16	P. A. Embury	California	
1915–16	Ira Mix	Oregon State	
1916–17	Adolph Sieberts	Oregon State	
1916–17	Ivan Price	Washington State	
1916–17	George Hjelte	California	
1916–17	Roy Bohler	Washington State	
1916–17	Steve Staatz	Washington	
1917–18	No conference competition		
1918–19	Ed Durno	Oregon	
1918–19	McClellan Rockey	Washington State	
1918–19	Henry Anderson	California	
1918–19	Hal Chapman	Oregon	
1918–19	Irving Cook	Washington	

=== 1920–1929 ===
Season	First team		Ref
Season	Players	Teams	Ref
1919–20	Ed Durno	Oregon	
1919–20	McClellan Rockey	Washington State	
1919–20	C. E. Righter	Stanford	
1919–20	Arthur Eggleston	California	
1919–20	Irving Cook	Washington	
1920–21	Ed Durno	Oregon	
1920–21	C. E. Righter	Stanford	
1920–21	Henry Sielk	Washington	
1920–21	Arthur Eggleston	California	
1920–21	Fred Adams	Stanford	
1921–22	John Talt	California	
1921–22	Al Fox	Idaho	
1921–22	Marshall Hjelte	Oregon State	
1921–22	Jimmy Bryan	Washington	
1921–22	Slats Gill	Oregon State	
1922–23	Al Fox	Idaho	
1922–23	John Talt	California	
1922–23	Hugh Latham	Oregon	
1922–23	Harold Telford	Idaho	
1922–23	J.R. Crawford	Washington	
1923–24	Slats Gill	Oregon State	
1923–24	John Talt	California	
1923–24	Hugh Latham	Oregon	
1923–24	Aubrey Kincaid	California	
1923–24	Dick Welts	Washington	
1924–25	Bob Hesketh	Washington	
1924–25	Harold Ridings	Oregon State	
1924–25	Bill Higgins	California	
1924–25	Carlos Steele	Oregon State	
1924–25	Algot Westergren	Oregon	
1925–26	Albert Schuss	Washington	
1925–26	Jerry Gunther	Oregon	
1925–26	Bill Higgins	California	
1925–26	George Dixon	California	
1925–26	Algot Westergren	Oregon	
1926–27	Francis Watson	California	
1926–27	Red Badgro	USC	
1926–27	Roy Okerberg	Oregon	
1926–27	George Dixon	California	
1926–27	Algot Westergren	Oregon	
1927–28	Monty Snider	Washington	
1927–28	Jess Mortensen	USC	
1927–28	Jack Bruner	USC	
1927–28	Alfred James	Washington	
1927–28	Rufus Gregory	California	
1928–29	Vern Corbin	California	
1928–29	Frank McMillan	Idaho	
1928–29	Harold McClary	Washington	
1928–29	Harlow Rothert	Stanford	
1928–29	Joel Cofield	California	

=== 1930–1939 ===
Season	First team		Ref
Season	Players	Teams	Ref
1929–30	Kent Pursel	California	
1929–30	Henry Swanson	Washington	
1929–30	Jess Mortensen	USC	
1929–30	John Lehners	USC	
1929–30	Art McLarney	Washington State	
1930–31	Dick Linthicum	UCLA	
1930–31	Henry Swanson	Washington	
1930–31	Wilbur Caldwell	USC	
1930–31	Ralph Cairney	Washington	
1930–31	Joel Cofield	California	
1931–32	Joe Kintana	California	
1931–32	Jerry Nemer	USC	
1931–32	Huntley Gordon	Washington State	
1931–32	Ralph Cairney	Washington	
1931–32	Carl Vendt	California	
1932–33	Jerry Nemer	USC	
1932–33	Hal Eifert	California	
1932–33	Ed Lewis	Oregon	
1932–33	Julie Bescos	USC	
1932–33	Hal Lee	Washington	
1933–34	Bob Galer	Washington	
1933–34	Hal Eifert	California	
1933–34	Lee Guttero	USC	
1933–34	Hal Lee	Washington	
1933–34	Julie Bescos	USC	
1934–35	Jack Hupp	USC	
1934–35	Bob Galer	Washington	
1934–35	Lee Guttero	USC	
1934–35	George Hibbard	Oregon State	
1934–35	Bryan Moore	Stanford	
1935–36	Hank Luisetti	Stanford	
1935–36	Wally Palmberg	Oregon State	
1935–36	Ralph Bishop	Washington	
1935–36	Bob Egge	Washington	
1935–36	Eddie Oram	USC	
1936–37	Hank Luisetti	Stanford	
1936–37	Ed Loverich	Washington	
1936–37	Ivar Nelson	Washington State	
1936–37	Eddie Oram	USC	
1936–37	Bryan Moore	Stanford	
1937–38	Hank Luisetti	Stanford	
1937–38	Lauren Gale	Oregon	
1937–38	Art Stoefen	Stanford	
1937–38	Jack Calderwood	Stanford	
1937–38	Wally Johansen	Oregon	
1938–39	Lauren Gale	Oregon	
1938–39	Ralph Vaughn	USC	
1938–39	Urgel Wintermute	Oregon	
1938–39	George Ziegenfuss	Washington	
1938–39	Dale Sears	USC	

=== 1940–1949 ===
Season	First team		Ref
Season	Players	Teams	Ref
1939–40	Ralph Vaughn	USC	
1939–40	John Dick	Oregon	
1939–40	Dale Sears	USC	
1939–40	Tom McGarvin	USC	
1939–40	Al Hunter	Oregon State	
1940–41	Vic Townsend	Oregon	
1940–41	Don Burness	Stanford	
1940–41	Paul Lindemann	Washington State	
1940–41	Ray Sundquist	Washington State	
1940–41	Jen Davidson	Stanford	
1941–42	Bob Ormsby	USC	
1941–42	Ray Turner	Idaho	
1941–42	John Mandic	Oregon State	
1941–42	Bill Cowden	Stanford	
1941–42	Jim Pollard	Stanford	
1942–43	Gale Bishop	Washington State	
1942–43	Gene Rock	USC	
1942–43	Chuck Gilmur	Washington	
1942–43	Jim Seminoff	USC	
1942–43	Bill Morris	Washington	

Season	North		South		Ref
Season	Players	Teams	Players	Teams	Ref
1943–44	Al Akins	Washington	Dick West	UCLA	
1943–44	Perry Nelson	Washington	John Higgins	California	
1943–44	Jack Nichols	Washington	Bob Howard	USC	
1943–44	Bill Morris	Washington	Wayne Hooper	California	
1943–44	Bill Taylor	Washington	Bill Rankin	UCLA	
1944–45	Dick Wilkins	Oregon	Gus Mota	California	
1944–45	Red Rocha	Oregon State	Bill Rankin	UCLA	
1944–45	Vince Hanson	Washington State	Jack Nichols	USC	
1944–45	Bob Hamilton	Oregon	Bill Putnam	UCLA	
1944–45	Bob Jorgenson	Washington	Bob Graham	USC	
1945–46	Fred Quinn	Idaho	Merv Lafaille	California	
1945–46	Gale Bishop	Washington State	Andy Wolfe	California	
1945–46	Red Rocha	Oregon State	Jack Nichols	USC	
1945–46	Dick Wilkins	Oregon	Chuck Clustka	UCLA	
1945–46	Norm Dalthorp	Washington	Bob Hogeboom	California	
1946–47	Bob Sheridan	Washington State	Jack Rocker	California	
1946–47	Jack Nichols	Washington	Andy Wolfe	California	
1946–47	Red Rocha	Oregon State	Don Barksdale	UCLA	
1946–47	Lew Beck	Oregon State	Dave Minor	UCLA	
1946–47	Stan Williamson	Oregon	John Higgins	Stanford	
1947–48	Sammy White	Washington	Chuck Hanger	California	
1947–48	Jack Nichols	Washington	John Stanich	UCLA	
1947–48	Vince Hanson	Washington State	John Higgins	Stanford	
1947–48	Cliff Crandall	Oregon State	Alex Hannum	USC	
1947–48	Preston Brimhall	Idaho	Andy Wolfe	California	
1947–48	Stan Williamson	Oregon	Dave Minor	UCLA	
1948–49	Ed Gayda	Washington State	Bill Sharman	USC	
1948–49	Sammy White	Washington	Alan Sawyer	UCLA	
1948–49	Roger Wiley	Oregon	Bill Hagler	California	
1948–49	Cliff Crandall	Oregon State	George Stanich	UCLA	
1948–49	Preston Brimhall	Idaho	Dave Davidson	Stanford	

=== 1950–1959 ===
Season	North		South		Ref
Season	Players	Teams	Players	Teams	Ref
1949–50	Will Urban	Oregon	Bill Sharman	USC	
1949–50	Ed Gayda	Washington State	George Yardley	Stanford	
1949–50	Gene Conley	Washington State	Carl Kraushaar	UCLA	
1949–50	Lou Soriano	Washington	George Stanich	UCLA	
1949–50	Bob Pritchett	Idaho	Bob Matheny	California	
1950–51	Frank Guisness	Washington	Dick Ridgway	UCLA	
1950–51	Bob Peterson	Oregon	Bill Hagler	California	
1950–51	Bob Houbregs	Washington	Jim Ramstead	Stanford	
1950–51	Bob Gambold	Washington State	Tom Riach	USC	
1950–51	Bob Payne	Oregon State	Eddie Sheldrake	UCLA	
1951–52	Frank Guisness	Washington	Jerry Norman	UCLA	
1951–52	Hartly Kruger	Idaho	Jim Ramstead	Stanford	
1951–52	Bob Houbregs	Washington	Bob Boyd	USC	
1951–52	Ken Hunt	Oregon	Don Johnson	UCLA	
1951–52	Danny Johnston	Oregon State	Ed Tucker	Stanford	
1952–53	Chet Noe	Oregon	Ken Flower	USC	
1952–53	Doug McClary	Washington	John Ricksen	California	
1952–53	Bob Houbregs	Washington	Bob McKeen	California	
1952–53	Joe Cipriano	Washington	Bob Matheny	California	
1952–53	Ken Wegner	Oregon	Ron Tomsic	Stanford	
1953–54	Ron Bennink	Washington State	Roy Irvin	USC	
1953–54	Dean Parsons	Washington	Bob McKeen	California	
1953–54	Swede Halbrook	Oregon State	Russ Lawler	Stanford	
1953–54	Cecil Holland	Oregon	Ron Livingston	UCLA	
1953–54	Bob Garrison	Idaho	Don Bragg	UCLA	
1954–55	Dean Parsons	Washington	John Moore	UCLA	
1954–55	Jim Loscutoff	Oregon	Don Bragg	UCLA	
1954–55	Swede Halbrook	Oregon State	Willie Naulls	UCLA	
1954–55	Ron Bennink	Washington State	Bob McKeen	California	
1954–55	Harlan Melton	Idaho	Ron Tomsic	Stanford	
1954–55	N/A	N/A	Dick Welsh	USC	

Season	First team		Second team		Ref
Season	Players	Teams	Players	Teams	Ref
1955–56	Willie Naulls	UCLA	Dave Gambee	Oregon State	
1955–56	Larry Beck	Washington State	Earl Robinson	California	
1955–56	Bruno Boin	Washington	Jack Dunne	USC	
1955–56	Morris Taft	UCLA	Barry Brown	Stanford	
1955–56	George Selleck	Stanford	Bill Bond	Stanford	
1956–57	Larry Friend	California	Bill Bond	Stanford	
1956–57	Dave Gambee	Oregon State	Earl Robinson	California	
1956–57	Doug Smart	Washington	Charlie Franklin	Oregon	
1956–57	Larry Beck	Washington State	Dick Banton	UCLA	
1956–57	Danny Rogers	USC	Bruno Boin	Washington	
1957–58	Dave Gambee	Oregon State	Earl Robinson	California	
1957–58	Doug Smart	Washington	Walt Torrence	UCLA	
1957–58	Don McIntosh	California	Paul Neumann	Stanford	
1957–58	Charlie Franklin	Oregon	Monte Gonzales	USC	
1957–58	Gary Simmons	Idaho	Whaylon Coleman	Idaho	
1958–59	Doug Smart	Washington	Bruno Boin	Washington	
1958–59	Johnny Werhas	USC	Al Buch	California	
1958–59	Walt Torrence	UCLA	Whaylon Coleman	Idaho	
1958–59	Darrall Imhoff	California	N/A	N/A	
1958–59	Denny Fitzpatrick	California	N/A	N/A	
1958–59	Paul Neumann	Stanford	N/A	N/A	
1958–59	Lee Harman	Oregon State	N/A	N/A	

=== 1960–1969 ===
Season	First team		Second team		Ref
Season	Players	Teams	Players	Teams	Ref
1959–60	Bill Hanson	Washington	Tandy Gillis	California	
1959–60	Bill McClintock	California	Johnny Werhas	USC	
1959–60	Darrall Imhoff	California	John Berberich	UCLA	
1959–60	John Arrillaga	Stanford	John Green	UCLA	
1959–60	Earl Shultz	California	Jerry Pimm	USC	
1960–61	Bill Hanson	Washington	John Windsor	Stanford	
1960–61	Bill McClintock	California	Earl Shultz	California	
1960–61	John Rudometkin	USC	John Berberich	UCLA	
1960–61	Gary Cunningham	UCLA	John Green	UCLA	
1960–61	Chris Appel	USC	Clint Names	Washington	
1961–62	John Windsor	Stanford	Gary Cunningham	UCLA	
1961–62	John Rudometkin	USC	Ken Stanley	USC	
1961–62	Bill Hanson	Washington	Ed Corell	Washington	
1961–62	John Green	UCLA	Walt Hazzard	UCLA	
1961–62	Chris Appel	USC	Tom Dose	Stanford	
1962–63	Gordon Martin	USC	Dale Easley	Washington	
1962–63	Ed Correll	Washington	Jack Hirsch	UCLA	
1962–63	Tom Dose	Stanford	Allen Young	USC	
1962–63	Walt Hazzard	UCLA	Wells Sloniger	USC	
1962–63	Don Clemetson	Stanford	Dick Smith	California	
1963–64	Jack Hirsch	UCLA	Dan Wolthers	California	
1963–64	Allen Young	USC	Clint Peeples	Washington	
1963–64	Tom Dose	Stanford	Ted Werner	Washington State	
1963–64	Gail Goodrich	UCLA	Byron Vadset	Washington State	
1963–64	Walt Hazzard	UCLA	Kent Hinckley	Stanford	
1963–64	N/A	N/A	Hollis Moore	Stanford	
1963–64	N/A	N/A	Dan Lufkin	California	
1963–64	N/A	N/A	Doug Bolcom	USC	
1964–65	Keith Erickson	UCLA	Dan Wolthers	California	
1964–65	Bob Bedell	Stanford	Kent Hinckley	Stanford	
1964–65	John Block	USC	Freddie Goss	UCLA	
1964–65	Gail Goodrich	UCLA	Jim Barnett	Oregon	
1964–65	Jim Jarvis	Oregon State	Ted Werner	Washington State	
1964–65	N/A	N/A	Allen Young	USC	
1965–66	Charlie White	USC	Bob Bedell	Stanford	
1965–66	Mike Lynn	UCLA	Kenny Washington	UCLA	
1965–66	John Block	USC	Loy Petersen	Oregon State	
1965–66	Jim Barnett	Oregon	Mike Warren	UCLA	
1965–66	Art Harris	Stanford	Russ Critchfield	California	
1965–66	N/A	N/A	Jim McKean	Washington State	
1966–67	Jim McKean	Washington State	Don Griffin	Stanford	
1966–67	Bill Hewitt	USC	Vince Fritz	Oregon State	
1966–67	Lew Alcindor (Note: Later known as Kareem Abdul-Jabbar.)	UCLA	Gordy Harris	Washington	
1966–67	Russ Critchfield	California	Mike Warren	UCLA	
1966–67	Lucius Allen	UCLA	Nick Jones	Oregon	
1967–68	Bill Hewitt	USC	Art Harris	Stanford	
1967–68	Jim McKean	Washington State	Dave Carr	Washington	
1967–68	Lew Alcindor	UCLA	Bob Presley	California	
1967–68	Russ Critchfield	California	Lucius Allen	UCLA	
1967–68	Mike Warren	UCLA	Vince Fritz	Oregon State	
1968–69	Curtis Rowe	UCLA	Gary Freeman	Oregon State	
1968–69	Ted Wierman	Washington State	George Irvine	Washington	
1968–69	Lew Alcindor	UCLA	Jackie Ridgle	California	
1968–69	Mack Calvin	USC	Stan Love	Oregon	
1968–69	Charlie Johnson	California	Don Griffin	Stanford	

=== 1970–1979 ===
Season	First team		Second team		Ref
Season	Players	Teams	Players	Teams	Ref
1969–70	Sidney Wicks	UCLA	Curtis Rowe	UCLA	
1969–70	George Irvine	Washington	John Vallely	UCLA	
1969–70	Stan Love	Oregon	Jackie Ridgle	California	
1969–70	Rick Erickson	Washington State	Steve Hawes	Washington	
1969–70	Paul Westphal	USC	Claude Terry	Stanford	
1970–71	Sidney Wicks	UCLA	Ron Riley	USC	
1970–71	Curtis Rowe	UCLA	Steve Hawes	Washington	
1970–71	Stan Love	Oregon	Jackie Ridgle	California	
1970–71	Paul Westphal	USC	Ansley Truitt	California	
1970–71	Phil Chenier	California	Freddie Boyd	Oregon State	
1970–71	N/A	N/A	Claude Terry	Stanford	
1970–71	N/A	N/A	Dennis Layton	USC	
1971–72	Ansley Truitt	California	Paul Westphal	USC	
1971–72	Ron Riley	USC	Joe Mackey	USC	
1971–72	Steve Hawes	Washington	John Coughran	California	
1971–72	Bill Walton	UCLA	Keith Wilkes (Note: Later known as Jamaal Wilkes.)	UCLA	
1971–72	Freddie Boyd	Oregon State	Henry Bibby	UCLA	
1971–72	Claude Terry	Stanford	N/A	N/A	
1972–73	Keith Wilkes	UCLA	Dan Anderson	USC	
1972–73	Rich Kelley	Stanford	Clint Chapman	USC	
1972–73	Bill Walton	UCLA	Sam Whitehead	Oregon State	
1972–73	Ron Lee	Oregon	Neal Jurgenson	Oregon State	
1972–73	Louie Nelson	Washington	Rickie Hawthorne	California	
1972–73	N/A	N/A	Doug Little	Oregon	
1973–74	Keith Wilkes	UCLA	Larry Pounds	Washington	
1973–74	Bill Walton	UCLA	Ray Price	Washington	
1973–74	Rich Kelley	Stanford	Brady Allen	California	
1973–74	Ron Lee	Oregon	Rickie Hawthorne	California	
1973–74	Dan Anderson	USC	Steve Puidokas	Washington State	
1973–74	N/A	N/A	Gus Williams	USC	
1974–75	Dave Myers	UCLA	Steve Puidokas	Washington State	
1974–75	Lonnie Shelton	Oregon State	Ed Schweitzer	Stanford	
1974–75	Rich Kelley	Stanford	Richard Washington	UCLA	
1974–75	Gus Williams	USC	Rickie Hawthorne	California	
1974–75	Ron Lee	Oregon	Clarence Ramsey	Washington	
1975–76	Marques Johnson	UCLA	Ed Schweitzer	Stanford	
1975–76	Greg Ballard	Oregon	Steve Puidokas	Washington State	
1975–76	Richard Washington	UCLA	Clarence Ramsey	Washington	
1975–76	James Edwards	Washington	Lars Hansen	Washington	
1975–76	Ron Lee	Oregon	Marv Safford	USC	
1976–77	Marques Johnson*	UCLA	Steve Puidokas	Washington State	
1976–77	Greg Ballard	Oregon	Harold Rhodes	Washington State	
1976–77	David Greenwood	UCLA	Ray Murry	California	
1976–77	James Edwards	Washington	Gene Ransom	California	
1976–77	Mike Bratz	Stanford	Roy Hamilton	UCLA	
1976–77	Rocky Smith	Oregon State	N/A	N/A	
1977–78	David Greenwood*	UCLA	Kimberly Belton	Stanford	
1977–78	Rickey Lee	Oregon State	Don Collins	Washington State	
1977–78	Cliff Robinson	USC	James Donaldson	Washington State	
1977–78	Raymond Townsend	UCLA	Don Carfino	USC	
1977–78	Roy Hamilton	UCLA	Purvis Miller	USC	
1978–79	David Greenwood*	UCLA	Don Collins	Washington State	
1978–79	Steve Johnson	Oregon State	Joe Nehls	Arizona	
1978–79	Cliff Robinson	USC	Wolfe Perry	Stanford	
1978–79	Larry Demic	Arizona	Kimberly Belton	Stanford	
1978–79	Brad Holland	UCLA	Purvis Miller	USC	
1978–79	Roy Hamilton	UCLA	Kiki Vandeweghe	UCLA	

=== 1980–1989 ===
Season	First team				Ref
Season	Players	Teams	Players	Teams	Ref
1979–80	Don Collins*	Washington State	Steve Johnson	Oregon State	
1979–80	Kurt Nimphius	Arizona State	Ray Blume	Oregon State	
1979–80	Kiki Vandeweghe	UCLA	Don Carfino	USC	
1979–80	Kimberly Belton	Stanford	Bryan Rison	Washington State	
1979–80	Doug True	California	Joe Nehls	Arizona	
1980–81	Ron Davis	Arizona	Alton Lister	Arizona State	
1980–81	Mike Sanders	UCLA	Ray Blume	Oregon State	
1980–81	Andra Griffin	Washington	Rod Foster	UCLA	
1980–81	Sam Williams	Arizona State	Mark Radford	Oregon State	
1980–81	Maurice Williams	USC	Lafayette Lever	Arizona State	
1980–81	Steve Johnson*	Oregon State	N/A	N/A	
1981–82	Kenny Fields	UCLA	Charlie Sitton	Oregon State	
1981–82	Mike Sanders	UCLA	John Revelli	Stanford	
1981–82	Dan Caldwell	Washington	Lester Conner*	Oregon State	
1981–82	Maurice Williams	USC	Dwight Anderson	USC	
1981–82	Mark McNamara	California	Lafayette Lever	Arizona State	
1982–83	Kenny Fields*	UCLA	Blair Rasmussen	Oregon	
1982–83	Steve Harriel	Washington State	Byron Scott	Arizona State	
1982–83	A.C. Green	Oregon State	Rod Foster	UCLA	
1982–83	Paul Williams	Arizona State	Jacque Hill	USC	
1982–83	Charlie Sitton	Oregon State	Keith Jones	Stanford	
1983–84	A.C. Green*	Oregon State	Blair Rasmussen	Oregon	
1983–84	Detlef Schrempf	Washington	Pete Williams	Arizona	
1983–84	Charlie Sitton	Oregon State	Keith Jones	Stanford	
1983–84	Kenny Fields	UCLA	Chris Beasley	Arizona State	
1983–84	Wayne Carlander	USC	Ralph Jackson	UCLA	
1984–85	Wayne Carlander*	USC	Blair Rasmussen	Oregon	
1984–85	A.C. Green	Oregon State	Chris Welp	Washington	
1984–85	Detlef Schrempf	Washington	Nigel Miguel	UCLA	
1984–85	Eddie Smith	Arizona	Keith Morrison	Washington State	
1984–85	Pete Williams	Arizona	N/A	N/A	
1985–86	Derrick Dowell	USC	Chris Welp*	Washington	
1985–86	Paul Fortier	Washington	Kevin Johnson	California	
1985–86	Reggie Miller	UCLA	Steve Kerr	Arizona	
1985–86	Jerry Adams	Oregon	Todd Lichti	Stanford	
1985–86	José Ortiz	Oregon State	Keith Morrison	Washington State	
1986–87	Derrick Dowell	USC	Chris Welp	Washington	
1986–87	Sean Elliott	Arizona	Steve Beck	Arizona State	
1986–87	Todd Lichti	Stanford	Kevin Johnson	California	
1986–87	Reggie Miller	UCLA	Pooh Richardson	UCLA	
1986–87	Phil Zevenbergen	Washington	Anthony Taylor	Oregon	
1986–87	José Ortiz*	Oregon State	N/A	N/A	
1987–88	Anthony Cook	Arizona	Todd Lichti	Stanford	
1987–88	Sean Elliott*	Arizona	Gary Payton	Oregon State	
1987–88	Trevor Wilson	UCLA	Eldridge Recasner	Washington	
1987–88	Howard Wright	Stanford	Pooh Richardson	UCLA	
1987–88	Steve Kerr	Arizona	Anthony Taylor	Oregon	
1988–89	Anthony Cook	Arizona	Leonard Taylor	California	
1988–89	Trent Edwards	Arizona State	Todd Lichti	Stanford	
1988–89	Sean Elliott*	Arizona	Gary Payton	Oregon State	
1988–89	Trevor Wilson	UCLA	Eldridge Recasner	Washington	
1988–89	Howard Wright	Stanford	Pooh Richardson	UCLA	

=== 1990–1999 ===
Season	First team				Ref
Season	Players	Teams	Players	Teams	Ref
1989–90	Jud Buechler	Arizona	Gary Payton*	Oregon State	
1989–90	Brian Hendrick	California	Terrell Brandon	Oregon	
1989–90	Adam Keefe	Stanford	Harold Miner	USC	
1989–90	Don MacLean	UCLA	Eldridge Recasner	Washington	
1989–90	Trevor Wilson	UCLA	Keith Smith	California	
1990–91	Teo Alibegovic	Oregon State	Ronnie Coleman	USC	
1990–91	Don MacLean	UCLA	Brian Hendrick	California	
1990–91	Tracy Murray	UCLA	Adam Keefe	Stanford	
1990–91	Brian Williams (Note: Later known as Bison Dele.)	Arizona	Terrell Brandon*	Oregon	
1990–91	Isaac Austin	Arizona State	Harold Miner	USC	
1991–92	Brian Hendrick	California	Scott Haskin	Oregon	
1991–92	Adam Keefe	Stanford	Sean Rooks	Arizona	
1991–92	Don MacLean	UCLA	Duane Cooper	USC	
1991–92	Chris Mills	Arizona	Terrence Lewis	Washington State	
1991–92	Tracy Murray	UCLA	Harold Miner*	USC	
1992–93	Chris Mills*	Arizona	Tyus Edney	UCLA	
1992–93	Lamond Murray	California	Jason Kidd	California	
1992–93	Ed O'Bannon	UCLA	Bennie Seltzer	Washington State	
1992–93	Scott Haskin	Oregon State	Stevin Smith	Arizona State	
1992–93	Rich Manning	Washington	Damon Stoudamire	Arizona	
1993–94	Mario Bennett	Arizona State	Jason Kidd*	California	
1993–94	Lamond Murray	California	Khalid Reeves	Arizona	
1993–94	Ed O'Bannon	UCLA	Stevin Smith	Arizona State	
1993–94	Lorenzo Orr	USC	Damon Stoudamire	Arizona	
1993–94	Tyus Edney	UCLA	Orlando Williams	Oregon	
1994–95	Brent Barry	Oregon State	Brevin Knight	Stanford	
1994–95	Mario Bennett	Arizona State	Ed O'Bannon†	UCLA	
1994–95	Dion Cross	Stanford	Ray Owes	Arizona	
1994–95	Tyus Edney	UCLA	Damon Stoudamire†	Arizona	
1994–95	Mark Hendrickson	Washington State	Orlando Williams	Oregon	
1995–96	Shareef Abdur-Rahim*	California	J. R. Henderson (Note: Later known as J. R. Sakuragi.)	UCLA	
1995–96	Toby Bailey	UCLA	Mark Hendrickson	Washington State	
1995–96	Dion Cross	Stanford	Brevin Knight	Stanford	
1995–96	Ben Davis	Arizona	Charles O'Bannon	UCLA	
1995–96	Isaac Fontaine	Washington State	Mark Sanford	Washington	
1995–96	Reggie Geary	Arizona			
1996–97	Toby Bailey	UCLA	Jelani McCoy	UCLA	
1996–97	Stais Boseman	USC	Charles O'Bannon	UCLA	
1996–97	Michael Dickerson	Arizona	Mark Sanford	Washington	
1996–97	Isaac Fontaine	Washington State	Jeremy Veal	Arizona State	
1996–97	Ed Gray*	California	Kenya Wilkins	Oregon	
1996–97	Brevin Knight	Stanford	N/A	N/A	
1997–98	Toby Bailey	UCLA	Todd MacCulloch	Washington	
1997–98	Mike Bibby*	Arizona	Miles Simon	Arizona	
1997–98	Carlos Daniel	Washington State	Jeremy Veal	Arizona State	
1997–98	Michael Dickerson	Arizona	Kris Weems	Stanford	
1997–98	J. R. Henderson	UCLA	Tim Young	Stanford	
1998–99	Mike Batiste	Arizona State	Arthur Lee	Stanford	
1998–99	A. J. Bramlett	Arizona	Todd MacCulloch	Washington	
1998–99	Baron Davis	UCLA	Mark Madsen	Stanford	
1998–99	Eddie House	Arizona State	Deaundra Tanner	Oregon State	
1998–99	Bobby Lazor	Arizona State	Jason Terry*	Arizona	

=== 2000–2009 ===
Season	First team				Ref
Season	Players	Teams	Players	Teams	Ref
1999–2000	Jason Gardner	Arizona	Mark Madsen	Stanford	
1999–2000	Eddie House*	Arizona State	Brian Scalabrine	USC	
1999–2000	Casey Jacobsen	Stanford	Alex Scales	Oregon	
1999–2000	Jason Kapono	UCLA	Loren Woods	Arizona	
1999–2000	Sean Lampley	California	Michael Wright	Arizona	
2000–01	Gilbert Arenas	Arizona	Casey Jacobsen	Stanford	
2000–01	Bryan Bracey	Oregon	Jason Kapono	UCLA	
2000–01	Sam Clancy	USC	Sean Lampley*	California	
2000–01	Jarron Collins	Stanford	Earl Watson	UCLA	
2000–01	Jason Collins	Stanford	Michael Wright	Arizona	
2001–02	Curtis Borchardt	Stanford	Jason Kapono	UCLA	
2001–02	Sam Clancy*	USC	Chad Prewitt	Arizona State	
2001–02	Jason Gardner	Arizona	Luke Ridnour	Oregon	
2001–02	Casey Jacobsen	Stanford	Luke Walton	Arizona	
2001–02	Fred Jones	Oregon	Doug Wrenn	Washington	
2002–03	Julius Barnes	Stanford	Philip Ricci	Oregon State	
2002–03	Ike Diogu	Arizona State	Luke Ridnour*	Oregon	
2002–03	Jason Gardner	Arizona	Joe Shipp	California	
2002–03	Luke Jackson	Oregon	Amit Tamir	California	
2002–03	Jason Kapono	UCLA	Luke Walton	Arizona	
2003–04	Josh Childress*	Stanford	Andre Iguodala	Arizona	
2003–04	Ike Diogu	Arizona State	Luke Jackson	Oregon	
2003–04	Desmon Farmer	USC	David Lucas	Oregon State	
2003–04	Channing Frye	Arizona	Leon Powe	California	
2003–04	Chris Hernandez	Stanford	Nate Robinson	Washington	
2004–05	Ike Diogu*	Arizona State	David Lucas	Oregon State	
2004–05	Channing Frye	Arizona	Nate Robinson	Washington	
2004–05	Dan Grunfeld	Stanford	Tre Simmons	Washington	
2004–05	Chris Hernandez	Stanford	Salim Stoudamire	Arizona	
2004–05	Thomas Kelati	Washington State	Dijon Thompson	UCLA	
2005–06	Hassan Adams	Arizona	Leon Powe	California	
2005–06	Arron Afflalo	UCLA	Gabe Pruitt	USC	
2005–06	Jordan Farmar	UCLA	Brandon Roy*	Washington	
2005–06	Matt Haryasz	Stanford	Ayinde Ubaka	California	
2005–06	Chris Hernandez	Stanford	Nick Young	USC	
2006–07	Arron Afflalo*	UCLA	Derrick Low	Washington State	
2006–07	Jon Brockman	Washington	Kyle Weaver	Washington State	
2006–07	Aaron Brooks	Oregon	Marcus Williams	Arizona	
2006–07	Darren Collison	UCLA	Nick Young	USC	
2006–07	Lawrence Hill	Stanford	N/A	N/A	

Season	First team		Second team		Third team		Ref
Season	Players	Teams	Players	Teams	Players	Teams	Ref
2007–08	Ryan Anderson	California	Jerryd Bayless	Arizona	Chase Budinger	Arizona	
2007–08	James Harden	Arizona State	Jon Brockman	Washington	Taj Gibson	USC	
2007–08	Brook Lopez	Stanford	Darren Collison	UCLA	Derrick Low	Washington State	
2007–08	Kevin Love*	UCLA	Maarty Leunen	Oregon	Jeff Pendergraph (Note: Later known as Jeff Ayres.)	Arizona State	
2007–08	O. J. Mayo	USC	Kyle Weaver	Washington State	Russell Westbrook	UCLA	

Season	First team				Second team		Ref
Season	Players	Teams	Players	Teams	Players	Teams	Ref
2008–09	Jon Brockman	Washington	James Harden*	Arizona State	Taj Gibson	USC	
2008–09	Chase Budinger	Arizona	Jordan Hill	Arizona	Daniel Hackett	USC	
2008–09	Patrick Christopher	California	Jeff Pendergraph	Arizona State	Josh Shipp	UCLA	
2008–09	Darren Collison	UCLA	Jerome Randle	California	Isaiah Thomas	Washington	
2008–09	Justin Dentmon	Washington	Taylor Rochestie	Washington State	Nic Wise	Arizona	

=== 2010–2019 ===
Season	First team				Second team		Ref
Season	Players	Teams	Players	Teams	Players	Teams	Ref
2009–10	Ty Abbott	Arizona State	Michael Roll	UCLA	Jamal Boykin	California	
2009–10	Patrick Christopher	California	Isaiah Thomas	Washington	Jeremy Green	Stanford	
2009–10	Landry Fields	Stanford	Klay Thompson	Washington State	Calvin Haynes	Oregon State	
2009–10	Quincy Pondexter	Washington	Derrick Williams	Arizona	Theo Robertson	California	
2009–10	Jerome Randle*	California	Nic Wise	Arizona	Nikola Vucevic	USC	
2010–11	Matthew Bryan-Amaning	Washington	Reeves Nelson	UCLA	DeAngelo Casto	Washington State	
2010–11	Jeremy Green	Stanford	Isaiah Thomas	Washington	Joevan Catron	Oregon	
2010–11	Jorge Guiterrez	California	Klay Thompson	Washington State	Jared Cunningham	Oregon State	
2010–11	Tyler Honeycutt	UCLA	Nikola Vucevic	USC	Harper Kamp	California	
2010–11	Malcolm Lee	UCLA	Derrick Williams*	Arizona	Trent Lockett	Arizona State	
2011–12	Allen Crabbe	California	Devoe Joseph	Oregon	Carlon Brown	Colorado	
2011–12	Jared Cunningham	Oregon State	Brock Motum	Washington State	Lazeric Jones	UCLA	
2011–12	Kyle Fogg	Arizona	André Roberson	Colorado	Harper Kamp	California	
2011–12	Jorge Gutierrez*	California	Terrence Ross	Washington	Josh Owens	Stanford	
2011–12	Solomon Hill	Arizona	Tony Wroten	Washington	E. J. Singler	Oregon	
2012–13	Jahii Carson	Arizona State	Mark Lyons	Arizona	Kyle Anderson	UCLA	
2012–13	Allen Crabbe*	California	Shabazz Muhammad	UCLA	Justin Cobbs	California	
2012–13	Spencer Dinwiddie	Colorado	Dwight Powell	Stanford	Carrick Felix	Arizona State	
2012–13	Larry Drew II	UCLA	André Roberson	Colorado	Brock Motum	Washington State	
2012–13	Solomon Hill	Arizona	E. J. Singler	Oregon	C. J. Wilcox	Washington	
2013–14	Jordan Adams	UCLA	Nick Johnson*	Arizona	Jordan Bachynski	Arizona State	
2013–14	Kyle Anderson	UCLA	Dwight Powell	Stanford	T. J. McConnell	Arizona	
2013–14	Jahii Carson	Arizona State	Chasson Randle	Stanford	Roberto Nelson	Oregon State	
2013–14	Justin Cobbs	California	Josh Scott	Colorado	C. J. Wilcox	Washington	
2013–14	Aaron Gordon	Arizona	Delon Wright	Utah	Joe Young	Oregon	
2014–15	Rondae Hollis-Jefferson	Arizona	Norman Powell	UCLA	Askia Booker	Colorado	
2014–15	Stanley Johnson	Arizona	Chasson Randle	Stanford	Elgin Cook	Oregon	
2014–15	DaVonté Lacy	Washington State	Tyrone Wallace	California	Kevon Looney	UCLA	
2014–15	T. J. McConnell	Arizona	Delon Wright	Utah	Brandon Taylor	Utah	
2014–15	Gary Payton II	Oregon State	Joe Young*	Oregon	Nigel Williams-Goss	Washington	
2015–16	Rosco Allen	Stanford	Elgin Cook	Oregon	Isaac Hamilton	UCLA	
2015–16	Ryan Anderson	Arizona	Julian Jacobs	USC	Dejounte Murray	Washington	
2015–16	Andrew Andrews	Washington	Gary Payton II	Oregon State	Ivan Rabb	California	
2015–16	Dillon Brooks	Oregon	Jakob Poeltl* (Note: This player's native last name is Pöltl; "Poeltl" is the standard English rendering.)	Utah	Kaleb Tarczewski	Arizona	
2015–16	Jaylen Brown	California	Josh Scott	Colorado	Gabe York	Arizona	
2016–17	Bryce Alford	UCLA	T. J. Leaf	UCLA	Kadeem Allen	Arizona	
2016–17	Lonzo Ball	UCLA	Lauri Markkanen	Arizona	Jordan Bell	Oregon	
2016–17	Dillon Brooks*	Oregon	Ivan Rabb	California	Josh Hawkinson	Washington State	
2016–17	Markelle Fultz	Washington	Reid Travis	Stanford	Chimezie Metu	USC	
2016–17	Kyle Kuzma	Utah	Derrick White	Colorado	Allonzo Trier	Arizona	
2017–18	Deandre Ayton*	Arizona	Jordan McLaughlin	USC	David Collette	Utah	
2017–18	Justin Bibbins	Utah	Chimezie Metu	USC	George King	Colorado	
2017–18	Noah Dickerson	Washington	Tres Tinkle	Oregon State	Payton Pritchard	Oregon	
2017–18	Tra Holder	Arizona State	Reid Travis	Stanford	Dušan Ristić	Arizona	
2017–18	Aaron Holiday	UCLA	Allonzo Trier	Arizona	Thomas Welsh	UCLA	
2018–19	Sedrick Barefield	Utah	Jaylen Nowell*	Washington	Luguentz Dort	Arizona State	
2018–19	Tyler Bey	Colorado	KZ Okpala	Stanford	Jaylen Hands	UCLA	
2018–19	Bennie Boatwright	USC	Matisse Thybulle	Washington	Remy Martin	Arizona State	
2018–19	Zylan Cheatham	Arizona State	Tres Tinkle	Oregon State	Stephen Thompson Jr.	Oregon State	
2018–19	Robert Franks	Washington State	McKinley Wright IV	Colorado	Kris Wilkes	UCLA	

=== 2020–present ===
Season	First team				Second team		Ref
Season	Players	Teams	Players	Teams	Players	Teams	Ref
2019–20	Oscar da Silva	Stanford	Payton Pritchard*	Oregon	Timmy Allen	Utah	
2019–20	CJ Elleby	Washington State	Chris Smith	UCLA	Tyler Bey	Colorado	
2019–20	Remy Martin	Arizona State	Isaiah Stewart	Washington	Matt Bradley	California	
2019–20	Zeke Nnaji	Arizona	Tres Tinkle	Oregon State	Nico Mannion	Arizona	
2019–20	Onyeka Okongwu	USC	McKinley Wright IV	Colorado	Jonah Mathews	USC	
2020–21	James Akinjo	Arizona	Remy Martin	Arizona State	Isaac Bonton	Washington State	
2020–21	Timmy Allen	Utah	Evan Mobley*	USC	Matt Bradley	California	
2020–21	Tyger Campbell	UCLA	Eugene Omoruyi	Oregon	Tahj Eaddy	USC	
2020–21	Oscar da Silva	Stanford	Ethan Thompson	Oregon State	Jaime Jaquez Jr.	UCLA	
2020–21	Chris Duarte	Oregon	McKinley Wright IV	Colorado	Johnny Juzang	UCLA	
2021–22	Terrell Brown Jr.	Washington	Bennedict Mathurin*	Arizona	Evan Battey	Colorado	
2021–22	Tyger Campbell	UCLA	Isaiah Mobley	USC	Branden Carlson	Utah	
2021–22	Jaime Jaquez Jr.	UCLA	Drew Peterson	USC	Michael Flowers	Washington State	
2021–22	Johnny Juzang	UCLA	Ąžuolas Tubelis	Arizona	Jalen Graham	Arizona State	
2021–22	Christian Koloko	Arizona	Jabari Walker	Colorado	Will Richardson	Oregon	
2022–23	Oumar Ballo	Arizona	Boogie Ellis	USC	Keion Brooks Jr.	Washington	
2022–23	Tyger Campbell	UCLA	Mouhamed Gueye	Washington State	Desmond Cambridge Jr.	Arizona State	
2022–23	Branden Carlson	Utah	Jaime Jaquez Jr.*	UCLA	Jaylen Clark	UCLA	
2022–23	N'Faly Dante	Oregon	Drew Peterson	USC	Spencer Jones	Stanford	
2022–23	Tristan da Silva	Colorado	Ąžuolas Tubelis	Arizona	K. J. Simpson	Colorado	
2023–24	Oumar Ballo	Arizona	Isaac Jones	Washington State	Jermaine Couisnard	Oregon	
2023–24	Adem Bona	UCLA	Caleb Love*	Arizona	Tristan da Silva	Colorado	
2023–24	Keion Brooks Jr.	Washington	Myles Rice	Washington State	Boogie Ellis	USC	
2023–24	Branden Carlson	Utah	K. J. Simpson	Colorado	Pelle Larsson	Arizona	
2023–24	N'Faly Dante	Oregon	Jaylon Tyson	California	Maxime Raynaud	Stanford	

== See also ==
- List of All-Pac-12 Conference women's basketball teams
