= 1954 NCAA Men's Basketball All-Americans =

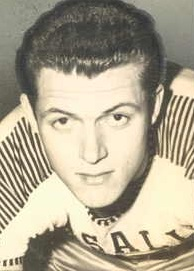
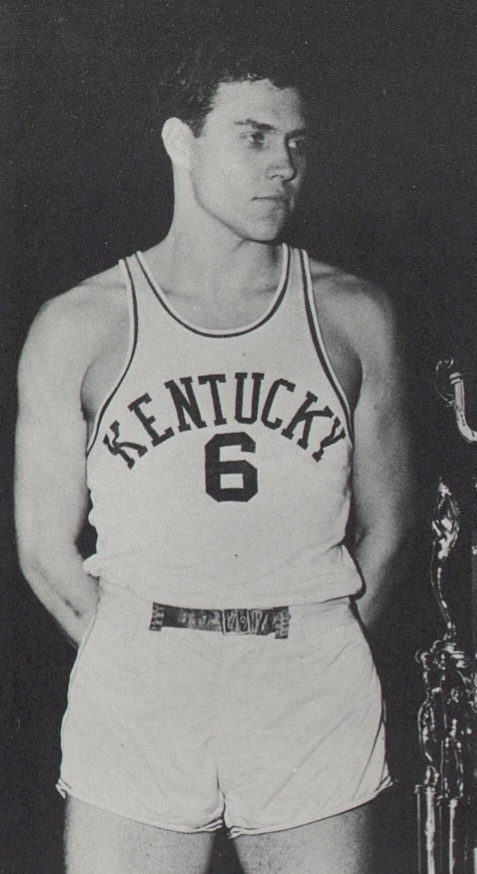
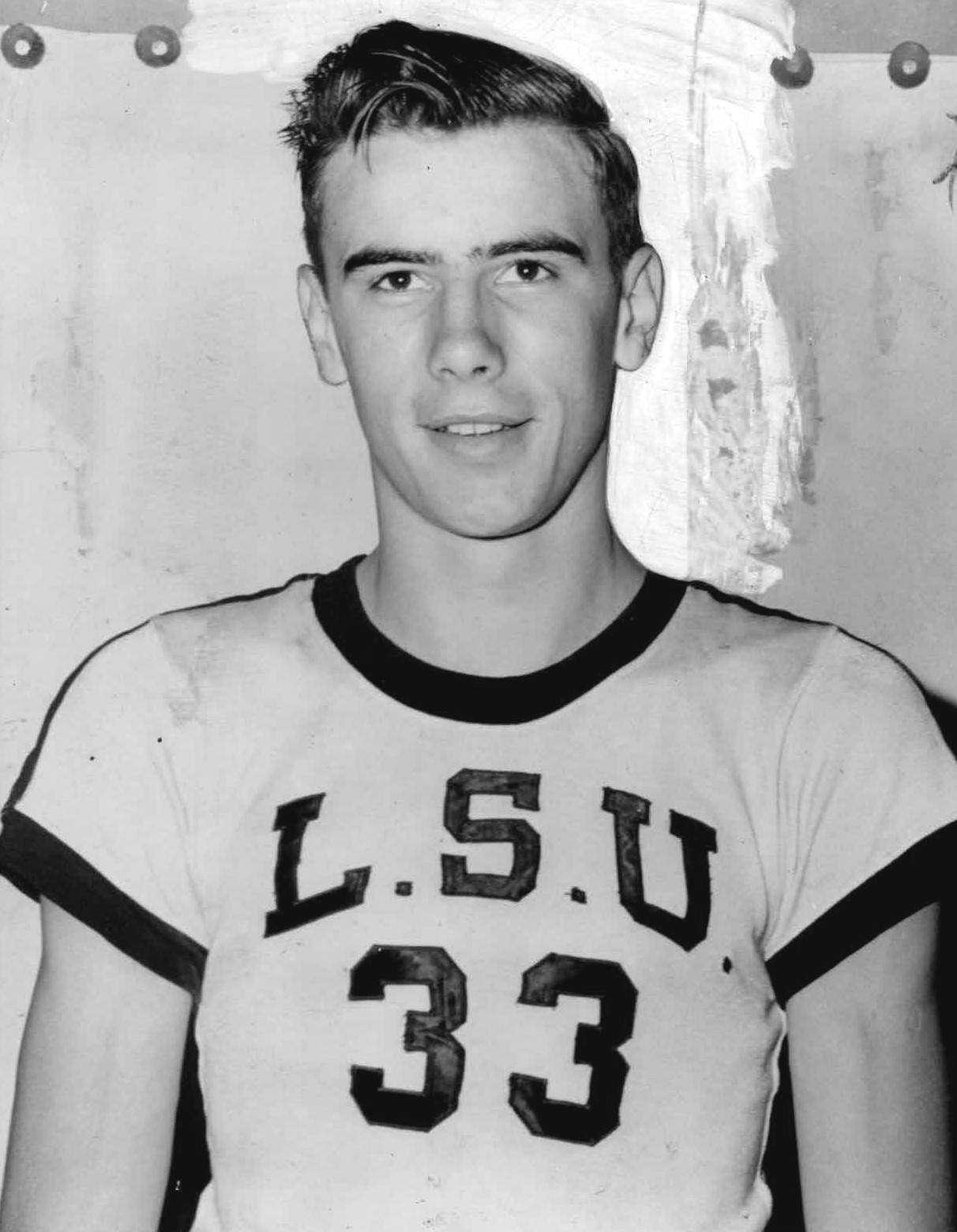
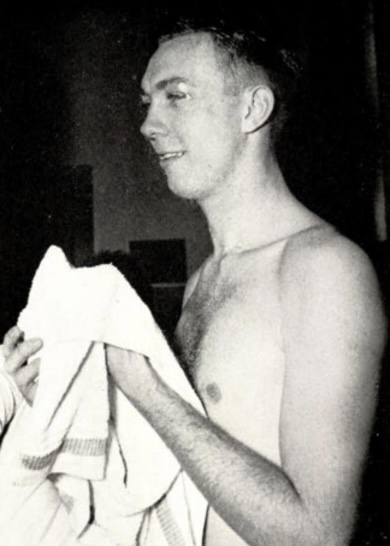
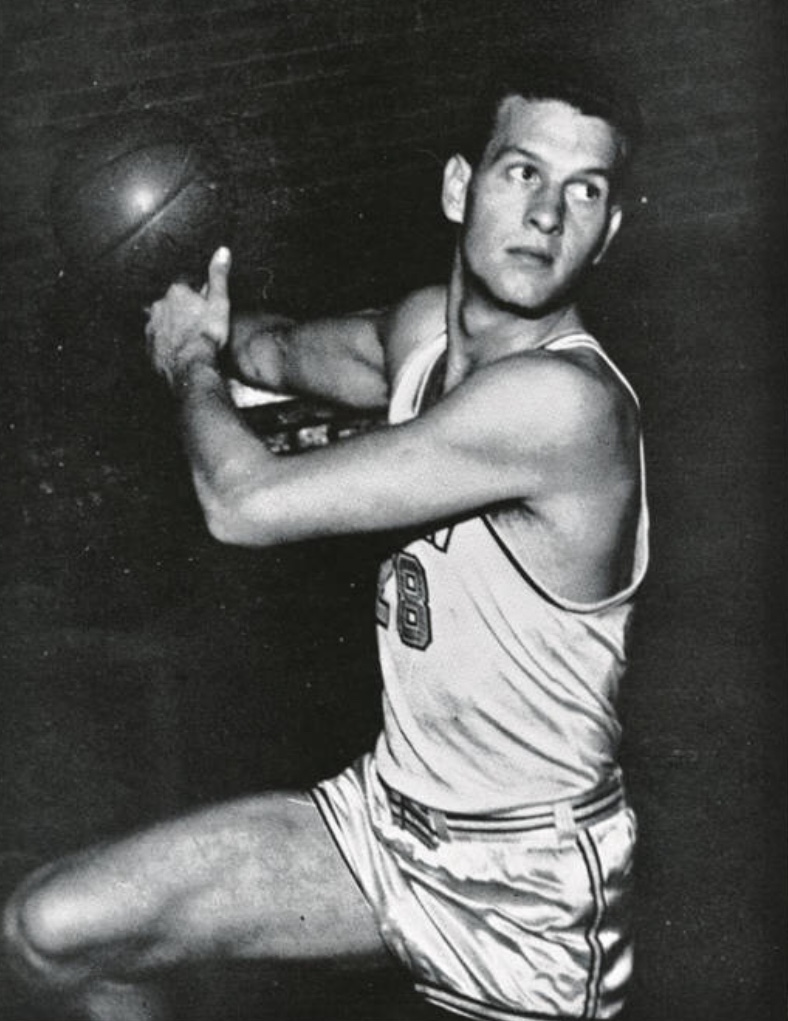
- Members of the 1954 Consensus All-America first team. Clockwise from upper left: Gola, Hagan, Selvy, Schlundt and Pettit.
- Awarded for: 1953–54 NCAA men's basketball season

The consensus 1954 College Basketball All-American team, as determined by aggregating the results of six major All-American teams. To earn "consensus" status, a player must win honors from a majority of the following teams: the Associated Press, Look Magazine, The United Press International, the Newspaper Enterprise Association (NEA), Collier's Magazine and the International News Service.

== 1954 Consensus All-America team ==
Consensus First Team
Player	Position	Class	Team
Tom Gola	F	Junior	La Salle
Cliff Hagan	F	Senior	Kentucky
Bob Pettit	C	Senior	Louisiana State
Don Schlundt	C	Junior	Indiana
Frank Selvy	G	Senior	Furman

Consensus Second Team
Player	Position	Class	Team
Bobby Leonard	G	Senior	Indiana
Tom Marshall	F	Senior	Western Kentucky
Bob Mattick	C	Senior	Oklahoma A&M
Frank Ramsey	G/F	Senior	Kentucky
Dick Ricketts	F/C	Junior	Duquesne

== Individual All-America teams ==
All-America Team
All-America Team	First team		Second team		Third team	
All-America Team	Player	School	Player	School	Player	School
Associated Press	Tom Gola	La Salle	Bevo Francis	Rio Grande	Dickie Hemric	Wake Forest
Associated Press	Cliff Hagan	Kentucky	Bobby Leonard	Indiana	Johnny Kerr	Illinois
Associated Press	Bob Pettit	Louisiana State	Tom Marshall	Western Kentucky	Bob Mattick	Oklahoma A&M
Associated Press	Don Schlundt	Indiana	Frank Ramsey	Kentucky	Togo Palazzi	Holy Cross
Associated Press	Frank Selvy	Furman	Dick Ricketts	Duquesne	Arnold Short	Oklahoma City
UPI	Tom Gola	La Salle	Bevo Francis	Rio Grande	Paul Ebert	Ohio State
UPI	Cliff Hagan	Kentucky	Bob Leonard	Indiana	Johnny Kerr	Illinois
UPI	Bob Pettit	Louisiana State	Tom Marshall	Western Kentucky	Bob Mattick	Oklahoma A&M
UPI	Don Schlundt	Indiana	Frank Ramsey	Kentucky	Togo Palazzi	Holy Cross
UPI	Frank Selvy	Furman	Dick Ricketts	Duquesne	Arnold Short	Oklahoma City
Look Magazine	Tom Gola	La Salle	Cliff Hagan	Kentucky	Ed Conlin	Fordham
Look Magazine	Bob Leonard	Indiana	Tom Marshall	Western Kentucky	Johnny Kerr	Illinois
Look Magazine	Bob Mattick	Oklahoma A&M	Don Schlundt	Indiana	Bob Matheny	California
Look Magazine	Frank Ramsey	Kentucky	Frank Selvy	Furman	Togo Palazzi	Holy Cross
Look Magazine	Dick Ricketts	Duquesne	Arnold Short	Oklahoma City	Bob Pettit	Louisiana State
NEA	Tom Gola	La Salle	Sihugo Green	Duquesne	No third team	
NEA	Cliff Hagan	Kentucky	Bob Mattick	Oklahoma A&M	No third team	
NEA	Bob Leonard	Indiana	Bob Pettit	Louisiana State	No third team	
NEA	Dick Ricketts	Duquesne	Don Schlundt	Indiana	No third team	
NEA	Frank Selvy	Furman	Arnold Short	Oklahoma City	No third team	
International News Service	Tom Gola	La Salle	Bob Leonard	Indiana	No third team	
International News Service	Cliff Hagan	Kentucky	Tom Marshall	Western Kentucky	No third team	
International News Service	Bob Pettit	Louisiana State	Frank Ramsey	Kentucky	No third team	
International News Service	Dick Ricketts	Duquesne	Dick Rosenthal	Notre Dame	No third team	
International News Service	Frank Selvy	Furman	Don Schlundt	Indiana	No third team	
Collier's	Tom Gola	La Salle	Bob Leonard	Indiana	No third team	
Collier's	Cliff Hagan	Kentucky	Bob Mattick	Oklahoma A&M	No third team	
Collier's	Bob Pettit	Louisiana State	Togo Palazzi	Holy Cross	No third team	
Collier's	Don Schlundt	Indiana	Dick Ricketts	Duquesne	No third team	
Collier's	Frank Selvy	Furman	Arnold Short	Oklahoma City	No third team	

AP Honorable Mention:

- Jesse Arnelle, Penn State
- B. H. Born, Kansas
- Don Bragg, UCLA
- John Clune, Navy
- Ed Conlin, Fordham
- Larry Costello, Niagara
- Rudy D'Emilio, Duke
- Paul Ebert, Ohio State
- Dick Garmaker, Minnesota
- Sihugo Green, Duquesne
- Swede Halbrook, Oregon State
- Joe Holup, George Washington
- Ed Kalafat, Minnesota
- Don Lange, Navy
- Cleo Littleton, Wichita State
- Bob Matheny, California
- Bob McKeen, California
- Joe Pehanick, Seattle
- Dick Rosenthal, Notre Dame
- Bob Schafer, Villanova
- Gene Schwinger, Rice
- Ken Sears, Santa Clara
- Gene Shue, Maryland
- Mel Thompson, North Carolina State
- Lou Tsioropoulos, Kentucky
- Jim Tucker, Duquesne
- Buzzy Wilkinson, Virginia

== See also ==
- 1953–54 NCAA men's basketball season
