= 1957 NCAA Men's Basketball All-Americans =

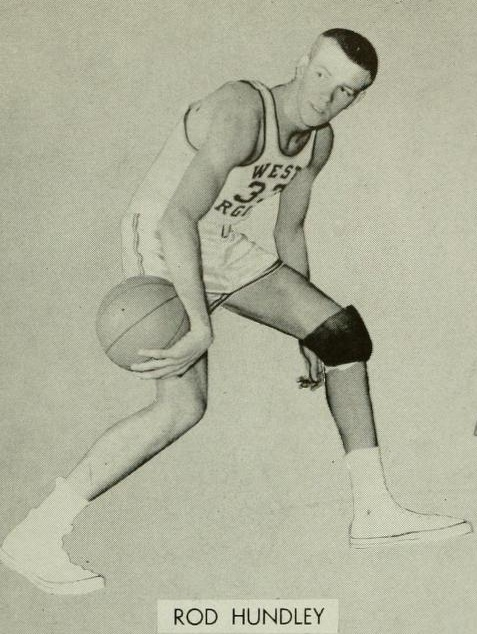
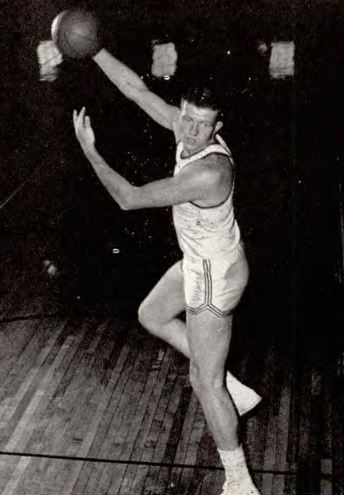
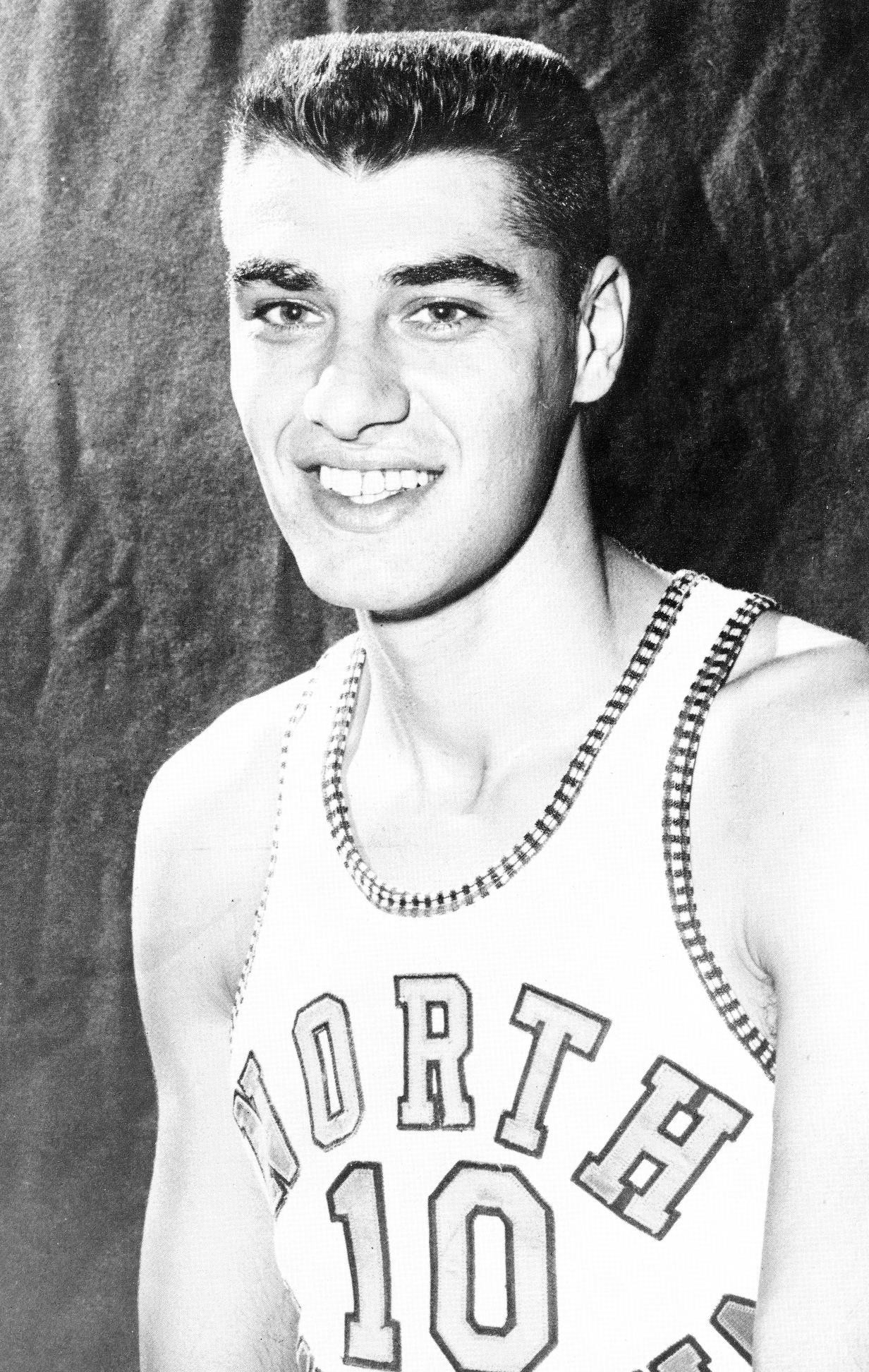
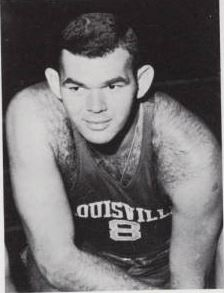
- Members of the 1957 Consensus All-America first team. Clockwise from upper left: Hundley, Krebs, Tyra, Rosenbluth (not pictured: Chamberlain, Forte).
- Awarded for: 1956–57 NCAA University Division men's basketball season

The consensus 1957 College Basketball All-American team, as determined by aggregating the results of six major All-American teams. To earn 'consensus' status, a player must win honors from a majority of the following teams: the Associated Press, the USBWA, The United Press International, the National Association of Basketball Coaches, the Newspaper Enterprise Association (NEA), and the International News Service.

== 1957 Consensus All-America team ==
Consensus First Team
Player	Position	Class	Team
Wilt Chamberlain	C	Sophomore	Kansas
Chet Forte	G	Senior	Columbia
Rod Hundley	G/F	Senior	West Virginia
Jim Krebs	F/C	Senior	Southern Methodist
Lennie Rosenbluth	F	Senior	North Carolina
Charlie Tyra	C	Senior	Louisville

Consensus Second Team
Player	Position	Class	Team
Elgin Baylor	F	Sophomore	Seattle
Frank Howard	F	Junior	Ohio State
Guy Rodgers	G	Junior	Temple
Gary Thompson	G	Senior	Iowa State
Grady Wallace	F	Senior	South Carolina

== Individual All-America teams ==
All-America Team
All-America Team	First team		Second team		Third team	
All-America Team	Player	School	Player	School	Player	School
Associated Press	Wilt Chamberlain	Kansas	Elgin Baylor	Seattle	Jim Ashmore	Mississippi State
Associated Press	Chet Forte	Columbia	Frank Howard	Ohio State	Archie Dees	Indiana
Associated Press	Rod Hundley	West Virginia	Jim Krebs	Southern Methodist	Bill Ebben	Detroit
Associated Press	Lennie Rosenbluth	North Carolina	Charlie Tyra	Louisville	Larry Friend	California
Associated Press	Gary Thompson	Iowa State	Grady Wallace	South Carolina	Guy Rodgers	Temple
USBWA/Look Magazine	Elgin Baylor	Seattle	No second or third teams (10-man first team)			
USBWA/Look Magazine	Wilt Chamberlain	Kansas	No second or third teams (10-man first team)			
USBWA/Look Magazine	Chet Forte	Columbia	No second or third teams (10-man first team)			
USBWA/Look Magazine	Frank Howard	Ohio State	No second or third teams (10-man first team)			
USBWA/Look Magazine	Rod Hundley	West Virginia	No second or third teams (10-man first team)			
USBWA/Look Magazine	Jim Krebs	Southern Methodist	No second or third teams (10-man first team)			
USBWA/Look Magazine	Guy Rodgers	Temple	No second or third teams (10-man first team)			
USBWA/Look Magazine	Lennie Rosenbluth	North Carolina	No second or third teams (10-man first team)			
USBWA/Look Magazine	Gary Thompson	Iowa State	No second or third teams (10-man first team)			
USBWA/Look Magazine	Charlie Tyra	Louisville	No second or third teams (10-man first team)			
NABC	Wilt Chamberlain	Kansas	Elgin Baylor	Seattle	Bruno Boin	Washington
NABC	Rod Hundley	West Virginia	George Bon Salle	Illinois	Archie Dees	Indiana
NABC	Jim Krebs	Southern Methodist	Chet Forte	Columbia	Frank Howard	Ohio State
NABC	Lennie Rosenbluth	North Carolina	Guy Rodgers	Temple	Ron Kramer	Michigan
NABC	Charlie Tyra	Louisville	Gary Thompson	Iowa State	Dick O'Neal	Texas Christian
UPI	Wilt Chamberlain	Kansas	Elgin Baylor	Seattle	Jim Ashmore	Mississippi State
UPI	Chet Forte	Columbia	Joe Gibbon	Mississippi	Johnny Cox	Kentucky
UPI	Rod Hundley	West Virginia	Jim Krebs	Southern Methodist	Archie Dees	Indiana
UPI	Lennie Rosenbluth	North Carolina	Gary Thompson	Iowa State	Frank Howard	Ohio State
UPI	Grady Wallace	South Carolina	Charlie Tyra	Louisville	Guy Rodgers	Temple
NEA	Wilt Chamberlain	Kansas	Elgin Baylor	Seattle	No third team	
NEA	Frank Howard	Ohio State	Chet Forte	Columbia	No third team	
NEA	Jim Krebs	Southern Methodist	Rod Hundley	West Virginia	No third team	
NEA	Guy Rodgers	Temple	Jimmy Smith	Steubenville	No third team	
NEA	Charlie Tyra	Louisville	Bennie Swain	Texas Southern	No third team	
International News Service	Elgin Baylor	Seattle	Chet Forte	Columbia	No third team	
International News Service	Wilt Chamberlain	Kansas	Rod Hundley	West Virginia	No third team	
International News Service	Jim Krebs	Southern Methodist	Guy Rodgers	Temple	No third team	
International News Service	Lennie Rosenbluth	North Carolina	Gary Thompson	Iowa State	No third team	
International News Service	Grady Wallace	South Carolina	Charlie Tyra	Louisville	No third team	

AP Honorable Mention:

- Harold Alcorn, Saint Louis
- Dick Banton, UCLA
- Larry Beck, Washington State
- Bruno Boin, Washington
- Bill Bond, Stanford
- Barney Cable, Bradley
- Vinnie Cohen, Syracuse
- Boo Ellis, Niagara
- Dick Gaines, Seton Hall
- Dave Gambee, Oregon State
- Joe Gibbon, Mississippi
- Johnny Green, Michigan State
- Vernon Hatton, Kentucky
- Don Hennon, Pittsburgh
- Johnny Lee, Yale
- Lee Marshall, Washington and Lee
- Don Medsker, Iowa State
- Mike Moran, Marquette
- Jack Murdock, Wake Forest
- Hank Nowak, Canisius
- Jack Parr, Kansas State
- Hub Reed, Oklahoma City
- Dave Ricketts, Duquesne
- Al Rochelle, Vanderbilt
- Lloyd Sharrar, West Virginia
- Doug Smart, Washington
- Win Wilfong, Memphis State

== See also ==
- 1956–57 NCAA University Division men's basketball season
