= Vince Hanson =

American basketball player and coach

Personal information
- Born: December 26, 1923 Austin, Minnesota, U.S.
- Died: August 30, 2009 (aged 85)
- Listed height: 6 ft 10 in (2.08 m)

Career information
- High school: Lincoln (Tacoma, Washington)
- College: Washington State (1942–1948)
- Position: Center
- Number: 10

Career highlights
- Consensus second-team All-American (1945); 2× First-team All-PCC (1945, 1948); WSU Athletics Hall of Fame; Pacific-10 Conference Hall of Honor
- Stats at Basketball Reference

Vincent Garnett Hanson (December 26, 1923 – August 30, 2009) was an NCAA All-American basketball player at Washington State University (WSU) in 1944–45. Hanson was a three-sport star at WSU, playing for the basketball, baseball and track and field teams between 1942–43 and 1947–48. His best season came during his sophomore season of 1944–45. That year, Hanson set a then-national single season scoring record with 592 points, led the Cougars to win the Pacific Coast Conference championship and was named a consensus second-team All-American. He finished his college career with 1,153 points.

After graduating in 1948, Hanson was selected by the Baltimore Bullets in the 1948 BAA Draft, although he never played professionally. He played one season of amateur basketball for the Akron Wingfoots in the AAU Basketball League. Afterward, Hanson entered the insurance business and also coached high school basketball at North Kitsap High School in Seattle, Washington.
