= Bruno Boin =

American basketball player (born c. 1937)

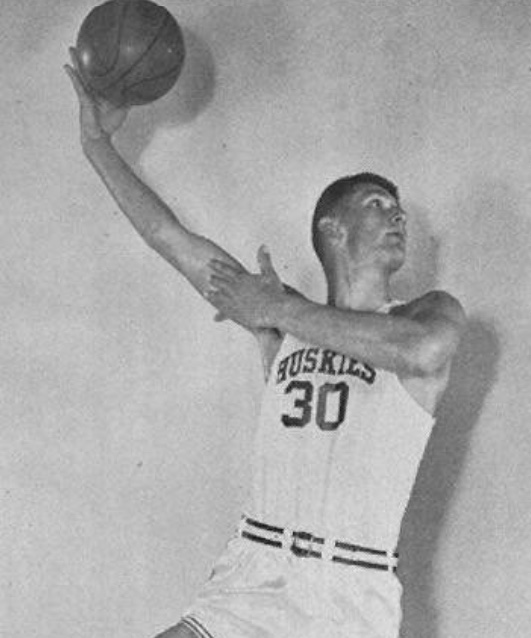
- Boin at Washington in 1959

Personal information
- Born: c. 1937 Seattle, Washington, U.S.
- Listed height: 6 ft 8 in (2.03 m)
- Listed weight: 210 lb (95 kg)

Career information
- High school: Franklin (Seattle, Washington)
- College: Washington (1955–1959)
- NBA draft: 1958: 8th round, 62nd overall pick
- Drafted by: St. Louis Hawks
- Position: Center

Career history
- 1955–1956, 1957–1960: Buchan Bakers

Career highlights
- Third-team All-American – NABC (1957); AP honorable mention All-American (1957); First-team All-PCC (1956); 2× Second-team All-PCC (1957, 1959); AAU national champion (1956)
- Stats at Basketball Reference

Bruno Boin (born c. 1937) is an American former basketball player known for his college career at the University of Washington in the 1950s. He was an NCAA All-American in 1957 as well as a first-team all-Pacific Coast Conference choice in 1958.

A native of Seattle, Washington, Boin starred at Franklin High School, guiding his team to a state championship as a junior in 1954 before embarking on his college career. In Boin's three seasons as a Washington Husky he scored 1,336 points, was twice a team captain, and earned numerous all-conference and all-district honors. He dropped out of school before the start of the 1957–58 season in order to preserve his NCAA eligibility; the school had been caught violating recruiting regulations the year before and were going to be placed in a one-year postseason ban. However he returned to graduate and later went on to post graduate work at UCLA. During his collegiate career he played for the Amateur Athletic Union's Buchan Bakers and won an AAU national championship with them during the 1955–56 season. He was selected in the NBA draft in both 1958 (St. Louis Hawks) and 1959 (Detroit Pistons) but never played in the league due to a bad back.

Boin went into the actuarial business for 33 years and retired in 1998. As of February 2005 he was splitting his time in retirement between Whidbey Island and Palm Desert, California. He was inducted into the University of Washington's Hall of Fame in 1992 and named to their All-Century Team in 2002.

Boin was married to Sheila Dolan Boin for 63 years (1960-2023) and they had three children: Patrick Christopher Boin (born 1965), Mari Boin (born 1968), and Leslie Madelon Boin (born 1969).
