= Pete Williams (basketball) =

American basketball player (born 1963)

Personal information
- Born: July 23, 1963 (age 63) Harbor City, California, U.S.
- Listed height: 6 ft 7 in (2.01 m)
- Listed weight: 190 lb (86 kg)

Career information
- High school: Nogales (Walnut, California)
- College: Mt. San Antonio (1981–1983); Arizona (1983–1985)
- NBA draft: 1985: 4th round, 89th overall pick
- Drafted by: Denver Nuggets
- Playing career: 1985–1999
- Position: Power forward
- Number: 12

Career history
- 1985–1987: Denver Nuggets
- 1987–1989: Fenerbahçe
- 1989–1990: Galatasaray
- 1990–1993: Tofaş S.K.
- 1993–1997: Ülkerspor
- 1998–1999: İTÜ

Career highlights
- 2× First-team All-Pac-10 (1984, 1985)
- Stats at NBA.com
- Stats at Basketball Reference

Robert Eric "Pete" Williams (born July 7, 1963) is an American former professional basketball player. He played for the Denver Nuggets in the National Basketball Association (NBA) from 1985 to 1987. He played college basketball for the Arizona Wildcats from 1983 to 1985. Following his stint in the NBA, Williams played professionally in Turkey and Japan.

He was inducted into the Pac-10 Basketball Hall of Honor in 2005.

== Career statistics ==
Legend
| GP | Games played | GS | Games started | MPG | Minutes per game |
| FG% | Field goal percentage | 3P% | 3-point field goal percentage | FT% | Free throw percentage |
| RPG | Rebounds per game | APG | Assists per game | SPG | Steals per game |
| BPG | Blocks per game | PPG | Points per game | **Bold** | Career high |

=== NBA ===
==== Regular season ====
| Year | Team | GP | GS | MPG | FG% | 3P% | FT% | RPG | APG | SPG | BPG | PPG |
|---|---|---|---|---|---|---|---|---|---|---|---|---|
| 1985–86 | Denver | **53** | **11** | **10.8** | **.604** | – | **.425** | **2.8** | **.3** | **.4** | **.4** | **2.8** |
| 1986–87 | Denver | 5 | 0 | 2.0 | .500 | – | – | .2 | .2 | .0 | .0 | .4 |
| Career | | 58 | 11 | 10.1 | .602 | – | .425 | 2.5 | .3 | .3 | .4 | 2.6 |

==== Playoffs ====
| Year | Team | GP | GS | MPG | FG% | 3P% | FT% | RPG | APG | SPG | BPG | PPG |
|---|---|---|---|---|---|---|---|---|---|---|---|---|
| 1986 | Denver | 4 | 0 | 4.5 | .500 | .000 | – | 1.0 | .8 | .0 | .0 | 1.0 |
