= Roy Bohler =

American basketball player (1893–1978)

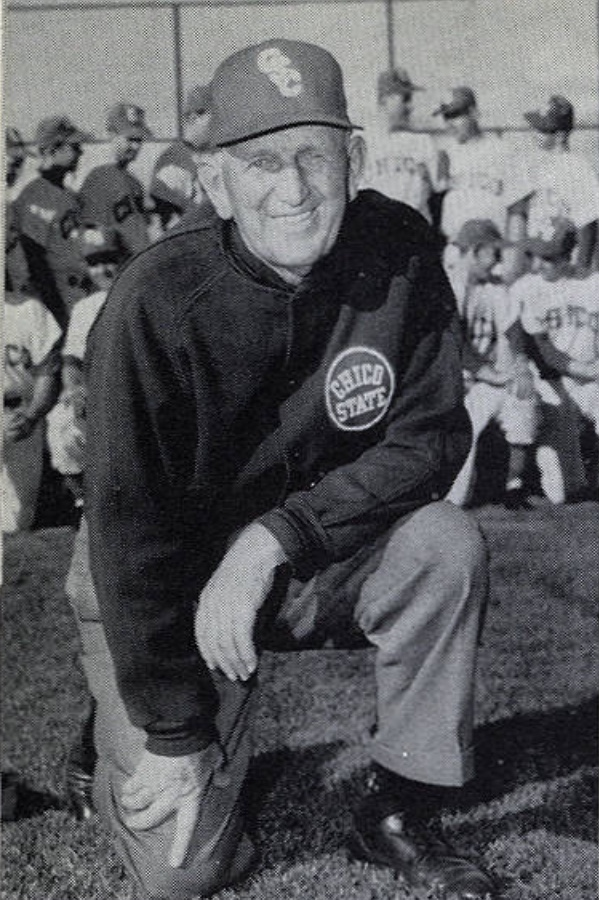
- Bohler from the 1960 Record

Biographical details
- Born: December 14, 1893; Mohnton, Pennsylvania, U.S.
- Died: February 21, 1978 (aged 84); Chula Vista, California, U.S.

Playing career

Football
- 1913–1916: Washington State

Basketball
- 1913–1917: Washington State

Baseball
- 1914–1917: Washington State
- Position: Center (basketball)

Coaching career (HC unless noted)

Football
- 1921–1922: Willamette
- 1926–1927: Beloit
- 1938: Chico State
- 1939: UC Santa Barbara (assistant)
- 1940–1949: Chico State

Basketball
- 1926–1929: Beloit
- 1945–1946: Humboldt State

Baseball
- 1947–1963: Chico State

Administrative career (AD unless noted)
- 1926–1929: Beloit

Head coaching record
- Overall: 29–57–6 (football); 12–45 (basketball); 245–167–1 (baseball)

Accomplishments and honors

Championships
- Football; FWC (1948)

Awards
- Basketball; Helms All-American (1916); First-team All-PCC (1917)

Roy Bohler (December 14, 1893 – February 21, 1978) was an American college athletics coach and athletic director. He also had a standout college basketball career as a player, earning All-American status in 1916. While playing for Washington State, Bohler – a 5'11" center – led the Cougars to a retroactive NCAA national championship in 1916–17 while playing under head coach Fred Bohler, his older brother.

Bohler coached college football, basketball, and baseball. His football stints include being the head coach at Willamette, Beloit, and Chico State. While at Beloit he also served as the school's athletic director. He resigned in March 1929 because he disagreed with providing student-athletes with scholarship money, an opinion that began gaining support among Beloit's officials during his time as athletic director. In basketball, Bohler coached at Beloit as well as for Humboldt State. His longest tenure for any team, however, was as the head baseball coach for Chico State, a position he held for 17 seasons. Chico State has since named their baseball field "Roy Bohler Field". In his 17 years as Chico State's coach, he led them to seven conference championships.

Bohler was born on December 14, 1893, in Mohnton, Pennsylvania, to John and Susan Bohler. He grew up in Pennsylvania. Bohler died on February 21, 1978, at a hospital in Chula Vista, California.

== Head coaching record ==
=== Football ===
Year	Team	Overall	Conference	Standing	Bowl/playoffs
Willamette Bearcats (Northwest Conference) (1921–1922)
1921	Willamette	1–5	0–3	T–6th	
1922	Willamette	3–4	0–2	T–7th	
Willamette:		4–9	0–5		
Beloit Blue Devils (Midwest Conference) (1926–1927)
1926	Beloit	0–7	0–6	9th	
1927	Beloit	1–6–1	0–6	9th	
Willamette:		1–13–1	0–12		
Chico State Wildcats (Far Western Conference) (1938)
1938	Chico State	2–5–1	0–2–1	T–4th	
Chico State Wildcats (Far Western Conference) (1940–1949)
1940	Chico State	3–3–1	1–2	3rd	
1941	Chico State	1–5–2	1–2	3rd	
1942	Chico State	5–1	1–1	2nd	
1943	No team—World War II				
1944	No team—World War II				
1945	No team—World War II				
1946	Chico State	2–7	1–1	2nd	
1947	Chico State	4–5	1–3	T–4th	
1948	Chico State	5–3	3–1	T–1st	
1949	Chico State	2–6–1	1–2–1	T–3rd	
Chico State:		24–35–5	9–14–2		
Total:		29–57–6			
National championship Conference title Conference division title or championship game berth
