= Bob Mattick =

American basketball player

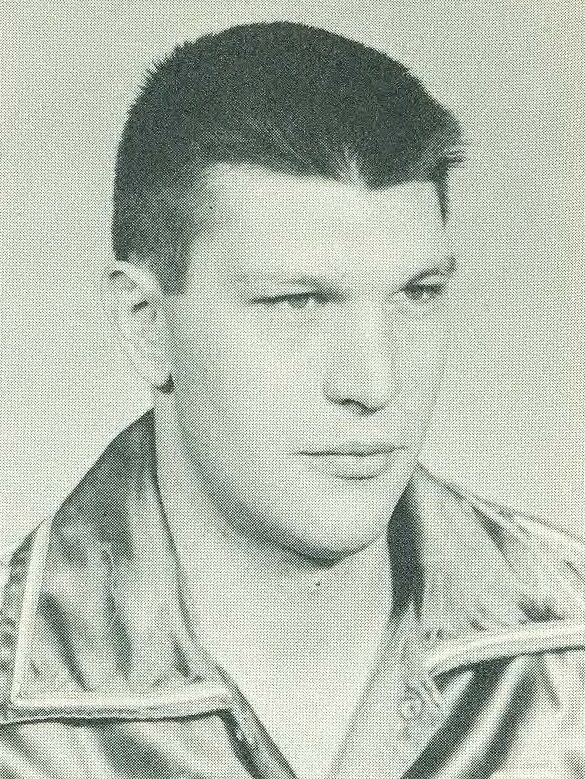
- Mattick with the Phillips 66ers

Personal information
- Born: May 30, 1933 Chicago, Illinois, U.S.
- Died: December 23, 2018 (aged 85) Stillwater, Oklahoma, U.S.
- Listed height: 6 ft 11 in (2.11 m)
- Listed weight: 225 lb (102 kg)

Career information
- High school: North Park (Chicago, Illinois)
- College: Oklahoma State (1951–1954)
- NBA draft: 1954: 2nd round, 11th overall pick
- Drafted by: Milwaukee Hawks
- Position: Center
- Number: 12

Career highlights
- Consensus second-team All-American (1954); 2× First-team All-MVC (1953, 1954)
- Stats at Basketball Reference

Robert Walter Mattick (May 30, 1933 – December 23, 2018) was an American basketball player. He played collegiately at Oklahoma A&M University (now Oklahoma State) and was named a second team All-American in 1954.

Mattick, a 6'11 center from Chicago, played for Oklahoma A&M from 1951 to 1954. Mattick was a star for the Aggies and one of the premier big men in college basketball his last two seasons. Mattick was named All-Missouri Valley Conference both years, and led the Aggies to two NCAA tournament bids in 1953 and 1954. As a senior, Bob Mattick became the first player in Oklahoma A&M (now called Oklahoma State) history to average more than 20 points per game (20.7) and the first to average a double-double (20.7 points, 11.2 rebounds per game). He was named a consensus second team All-American that year. He finished with 1,378 points (16.6 per game) and 772 rebounds (9.3 per game) for his three-year career.

Following the completion of his college career, Mattick was drafted by the Milwaukee Hawks in the 1954 NBA draft. However, he never played in the NBA, instead opting for the Phillips 66ers of the Amateur Athletic Union.
