= 1916 NCAA Men's Basketball All-Americans =

- Awarded for: 1915–16 NCAA men's basketball season

The 1916 College Basketball All-American team, as chosen retroactively by the Helms Athletic Foundation. The player highlighted in gold was chosen as the Helms Foundation College Basketball Player of the Year retroactively in 1944.

Player	Team
Roy Bohler	Washington State
Bill Chandler	Wisconsin
Cyril Haas	Princeton
George Levis	Wisconsin
Clyde Littlefield	Texas
Edward McNichol	Penn
Dick Romney	Utah
Adolph Sieberts	Oregon Agricultural
Fred Williams	Missouri
Ray Woods	Illinois

== See also ==
- 1915–16 NCAA men's basketball season
