= Kim Belton =

American basketball player (born 1958)

Personal information
- Born: April 2, 1958 (age 68) The Bronx, New York, U.S.
- Listed height: 6 ft 7 in (2.01 m)
- Listed weight: 225 lb (102 kg)

Career information
- High school: Horace Mann (The Bronx, New York)
- College: Stanford (1976–1980)
- NBA draft: 1980: 2nd round, 42nd overall pick
- Drafted by: Phoenix Suns
- Position: Small forward

Career highlights
- 2× AP Honorable Mention All-American (1979, 1980); First-team All-Pac-12 (1980); Second-team All-Pac-12 (1978, 1979); First-team Academic All-American (1980)
- Stats at Basketball Reference

Kimberly Belton (born April 2, 1958) is an American sports producer and former basketball player. He starred while playing collegiately for the Stanford Cardinal, where he led the team in scoring for two seasons and was a three-time All-Pac-12 selection. Belton set program scoring records in total points and rebounds. He was inducted to the Stanford Athletics Hall of Fame in 1999 and the Pac-12 Conference Hall of Honor in 2016.

Belton was selected by the Phoenix Suns as the 42nd overall pick in the 1980 NBA draft and played preseason, but tendinitis in a knee ended his professional basketball aspirations.

Belton began his broadcasting career in 1981 as a production assistant with ABC Sports. Belton would become an associate director two years later. In 1985, Belton joined Turner Sports and worked as the coordinating producer for National Basketball Association (NBA) games. Belton worked as a freelancer and produced college football and college basketball games for ESPN and ABC.

== Career statistics ==
Legend
GP	Games played	GS	Games started	MPG	Minutes per game
FG%	Field goal percentage	3P%	3-point field goal percentage	FT%	Free throw percentage
RPG	Rebounds per game	APG	Assists per game	SPG	Steals per game
BPG	Blocks per game	PPG	Points per game	**Bold**	Career high

=== College ===
Year	Team	GP	GS	MPG	FG%	3P%	FT%	RPG	APG	SPG	BPG	PPG
1976–77	Stanford	**27**	26	32.5	.544	–	.570	8.4	1.9	.7	**1.0**	12.5
1977–78	Stanford	**27**	25	29.4	.543	–	.590	9.0	1.7	.7	.7	15.0
1978–79	Stanford	**27**	**27**	33.6	**.619**	–	.426	8.7	**2.6**	.7	.6	14.3
1979–80	Stanford	26	26	**35.8**	.584	–	**.678**	**9.8**	1.9	**1.1**	.9	**18.7**
Career		107	104	32.8	.572	–	.580	9.0	2.0	.8	.8	15.1
