= Larry Friend =

American basketball player (1935–1998)

Personal information
- Born: April 14, 1935 Chicago, Illinois, U.S.
- Died: February 27, 1998 (aged 62)
- Listed height: 6 ft 4.75 in (1.95 m)
- Listed weight: 185 lb (84 kg)

Career information
- High school: Fairfax (Los Angeles, California)
- College: Los Angeles CC (1953–1954); California (1954–1957)
- NBA draft: 1957: 2nd round, 13th overall pick
- Drafted by: New York Knicks
- Position: Guard / forward
- Number: 7

Career history
- 1957–1958: New York Knicks
- 1961–1962: Los Angeles Jets

Career highlights
- Third-team All-American – AP (1957); All-PCC (1957)
- Stats at NBA.com
- Stats at Basketball Reference

Larry Haskell Friend (April 14, 1935 – February 27, 1998) was an American National Basketball Association (NBA) player. He played college basketball for the California Golden Bears.

== Biography ==
Friend was born and raised in Chicago, Illinois, and was Jewish. He played basketball at Marshall High School in Chicago. However, he moved to Los Angeles, California, before his senior year and played basketball at Fairfax High School.

Friend first played college basketball at Los Angeles City College, where he was named an All-American Junior College. He then transferred to the University of California, Berkeley, where he was a three-year starter for the Golden Bears. He averaged 19.1 points per game his senior season and was also named to the AP All-American third team.

Friend was drafted with the fifth pick in the second round of the 1957 NBA draft by the New York Knicks. In his one season with the Knicks, Friend averaged 4.0 points, 2.4 rebounds, and 1.1 assists per game. In 1961–62 Friend returned to professional basketball to play for the Los Angeles Jets in the American Basketball League. He appeared in thirty-nine games for the Jets and averaged 11.0 points and 3.7 rebounds per game, while also leading the league in three-point shooting (58–163). Due to financial problems, the Jets folded midway through their first season. Following his playing career, Friend owned an investment business. In 1990 he was inducted into the Southern California Jewish Sports Hall of Fame.

He died on February 27, 1998, in Newport, California, of prostate cancer. He is survived by four children, Denise, Russell, Matthew, and Nicholas.

== Career statistics ==
Legend
GP	Games played	GS	Games started	MPG	Minutes per game
FG%	Field goal percentage	3P%	3-point field goal percentage	FT%	Free throw percentage
RPG	Rebounds per game	APG	Assists per game	SPG	Steals per game
BPG	Blocks per game	PPG	Points per game	**Bold**	Career high

=== NBA ===
==== Regular season ====
Year	Team	GP	MPG	FG%	FT%	RPG	APG	PPG
1957–58	New York	44	12.9	.327	.659	2.4	1.1	4.0
