= Bob Matheny =

American basketball player (1929–1978)

Personal information
- Born: February 9, 1929
- Died: June 30, 1978 (aged 49)
- Listed height: 5 ft 11 in (1.80 m)
- Listed weight: 170 lb (77 kg)

Career information
- High school: Lowell (San Francisco, California)
- College: CC of San Francisco (1948–1949); California (1949–1950, 1952–1954)
- NBA draft: 1953: — round, —
- Drafted by: New York Knicks
- Position: Point guard

Career history
- 1951–1952: Oakland Atlas Engineers
- 1954–?: San Francisco Athletic Club

Career highlights
- Third-team All-American – Look (1954); 2× All-PCC (1950, 1953)
- Stats at Basketball Reference

Robert William Matheny (February 9, 1929 – June 30, 1978) was an American basketball player known for his All-American college career at the University of California, Berkeley.

Matheny played basketball at Lowell High School in San Francisco, then for a season at the City College of San Francisco before playing for California of the Pacific Coast Conference (now known as the Pac-12 Conference) starting the 1949–50 season. Matheny immediately moved into the starting lineup for the Golden Bears, averaging 7.5 points per game and running the offense from the guard position. At the close of the year, he was named first-team all-conference in recognition of his play, the only sophomore so honoured. Matheny's college career suffered a setback in that off-season, as he was diagnosed with polio and medically unable to play college basketball for two years. He played the 1951–52 season for the Oakland Atlas Engineers of the Amateur Athletic Union (AAU) before being cleared to return to Cal for the 1952–53 season. In 1952–53, Matheny averaged 11.9 points per game and was again honoured as an all-conference pick. He was 5 ft 11 in (1.80 m) standing at 170 lb (77 kg). The following season, he raised his scoring average to 13.5 points per game and was named a third-team All-American by Look Magazine.

Matheny was drafted by the New York Knicks in the 1953 NBA draft, but never played in the league. He returned to AAU action after his college career, playing with the San Francisco Athletic Club.

Matheny died on June 30, 1978, of a brain ailment.
