= 1926 Beloit Blue Devils football team =

American college football season

1926 Beloit Blue Devils football
- Conference: Midwest Conference
- Record: 0–7 (0–6 MWC)
- Head coach: Roy Bohler (1st season)

1926 Midwest Conference football standings
	Conf.					Overall
Team	W		L		T	W		L		T
Carleton $	3	–	0	–	0	6	–	1	–	0
Coe	5	–	1	–	0	6	–	2	–	0
Monmouth (IL)	2	–	1	–	0	7	–	1	–	0
Lawrence	1	–	1	–	1	3	–	2	–	2
Hamline	1	–	1	–	0	4	–	4	–	0
Cornell (IA)	3	–	3	–	0	3	–	4	–	0
Ripon	1	–	2	–	1	2	–	3	–	2
Knox	1	–	2	–	0	2	–	5	–	1
Beloit	0	–	6	–	0	0	–	7	–	0
$ – Conference champion

The 1926 Beloit Blue Devils football team represented Beloit College as a member of the Midwest Conference (MWC) during the 1926 college football season. In Roy Bohler's first year with the Buccaneers, Beloit compiled a 0–7 record, and was outscored by their opponents by a total of 239 to 14, a complete turnaround after the previous season's 6–2 MWC co-championship record.

== Schedule ==
Date	Opponent	Site	Result	Attendance	Source
October 2	at Notre Dame*	Cartier Field; Notre Dame, IN	L 0–77	8,000	
October 9	Cornell (IA)	Beloit, WI	L 0–17		
October 16	Monmouth (IL)	Beloit, WI	L 7–23		
October 23	at Knox	Galesburg, IL	L 0–26		
October 30	Ripon	Beloit, WI	L 0–33		
November 6	Lawrence^{†}	Beloit, WI	L 7–24		
November 20	at Coe	Cedar Rapids, IA	L 0–39		
*Non-conference game; ^{†}Homecoming
