= Paul Valenti =

American college basketball player and coach

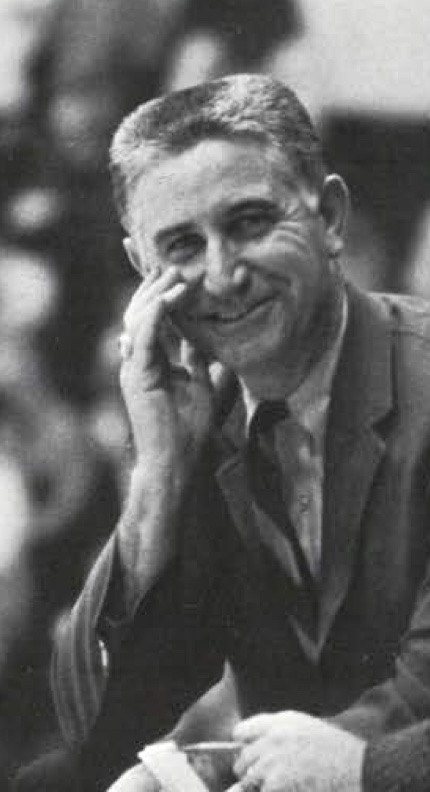
- Valenti from the 1970 Beaver

Biographical details
- Born: September 10, 1920; San Francisco, California, U.S.
- Died: September 13, 2014 (aged 94); Corvallis, Oregon, U.S.

Playing career
- 1939–1942: Oregon State
- Position: Guard/Forward

Coaching career (HC unless noted)
- 1946–1964: Oregon State (assistant)
- 1964–1970: Oregon State

Accomplishments and honors

Awards
- UPI West Coast Coach of the Year (1966)

Paul Bartholomew Valenti (September 10, 1920 – September 13, 2014) was an American college basketball player and coach, known for his long association with Oregon State University.

Valenti recruited and coached the first African American basketball player in Oregon State history when he added junior college transfer Charlie White to the Beaver squad for the 1964–65 season.

Valenti is a member of the Oregon State Athletic Hall of Fame and the Pac-12 Conference Men's Basketball Hall of Honor.

== Early life ==
Paul Valenti was born on September 10, 1920, in San Francisco, California, to an Italian immigrant couple from Mill Valley. Valenti attended Tamalpais High School in Mill Valley where he was a star athlete on the school's tennis and basketball teams.

== Career ==
=== Collegiate career ===
Valenti enrolled at Oregon State College (OSC) in Corvallis, Oregon, in September 1938, turning down an offer to play from in-state rival University of Oregon. As first-year students were prohibited from participating in varsity athletics in this era, Valenti spent the 1938–39 season on the OSC Freshman basketball team, earning his stripes as a star forward for the undefeated squad.

The 6-foot-1-inch (1.85 m) Valenti was promoted to the OSC varsity basketball team for the 1939–40 season, for which he was a "swingman," starting games at both forward and guard.

Valenti spent three years playing for coach Slats Gill, primarily as a shooting guard, finishing his collegiate career with the 1941–42 campaign.

=== Coaching career ===
After a stint in the United States Navy during World War II, during which he served in the Pacific Theater, Valenti returned to Corvallis in 1946 as an assistant to Gill. He remained in that position for 18 years.

Valenti got his first taste of head coaching during the 1959–60 season as he served as interim head coach of the Beavers when Gill fell ill, leading the team to 9 victories in the 12 games that he coached.

Valenti succeeded his mentor Slats Gill as Oregon State's head coach in 1964. During his first year at the helm, Valenti broke the school's color barrier when he recruited and coached the first black scholarship basketball player at Oregon State University, Charlie White, a six-foot-three guard who transferred from Monterey Junior College in California.

Valenti had his best season in 1965–66, leading the Beavers to the AAWU (now the Pac-12 Conference) title and a berth in the 1966 NCAA Tournament, after being picked to finish last in the league. His 1965–66 unit was the only team other than UCLA to win an AAWU/Pac-8/Pac-10 title between 1963–64 and 1978–79.

During his six full seasons as head coach, Valenti compiled a 91–82 record.

== Death and legacy ==
Paul Valenti died on September 13, 2014, at the age of 94.

Valenti is a member of the Oregon State Athletic Hall of Fame and the Pac-12 Conference Men's Basketball Hall of Honor.

He is the namesake of the Paul Valenti Award, an honor bestowed every year by Oregon State to the basketball player demonstrating the greatest desire and determination.

== Head coaching record ==
Record table
| Season | Team | Overall | Conference | Standing | Postseason |
|---|---|---|---|---|---|
Oregon State (Independent) (1959–1960)
| 1959–60 | Oregon State | 9–3 | | | |
Oregon State (AAWU / Pacific–8) (1964–1970)
| 1964–65 | Oregon State | 16–10 | 7–7 | 4th | |
| 1965–66 | Oregon State | 21–7 | 12–2 | 1st | NCAA Elite Eight |
| 1966–67 | Oregon State | 14–14 | 8–8 | t2nd | |
| 1967–68 | Oregon State | 12–13 | 8–6 | t3rd | |
| 1968–69 | Oregon State | 12–14 | 8–6 | t5th | |
| 1969–70 | Oregon State | 10–16 | 4–10 | 7th | |
| Oregon State: | | 91–82 (.526) | 47–40 (.540) | | |
| Total: | | 91–82 (.526) | | | |
National champion Postseason invitational champion Conference regular season champion Conference regular season and conference tournament champion Division regular season champion Division regular season and conference tournament champion Conference tournament champion

== Works ==
- Paul Bartholomew Valenti, History of Basketball at Oregon State College From 1928 Through 1949 (Master's thesis), Oregon State College, June 1957.
