= Ed Gayda =

American basketball player (1927–2021)

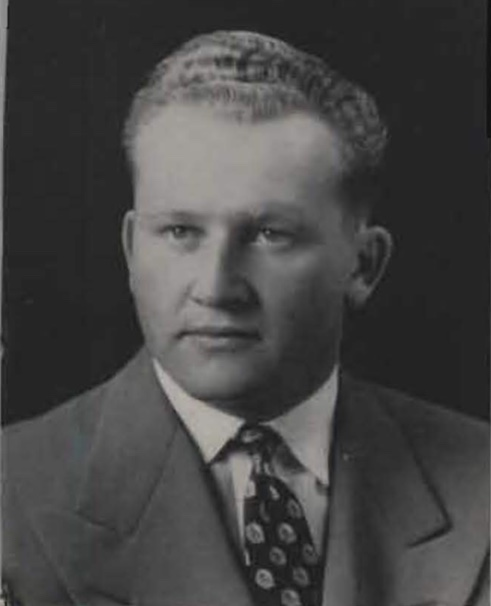
- Gayda from the 1950 Chinook

Personal information
- Born: May 16, 1927
- Died: December 11, 2021 (aged 94)
- Listed height: 6 ft 4 in (1.93 m)
- Listed weight: 210 lb (95 kg)

Career information
- High school: Hoquiam (Hoquiam, Washington)
- College: Washington State (1946–1950)
- NBA draft: 1950: 2nd round, 15th overall pick
- Drafted by: Tri-Cities Blackhawks
- Playing career: 1950–1951
- Position: Guard / forward
- Number: 10

Career history
- 1950–1951: Tri-Cities Blackhawks

Career highlights
- 2× First-team All-PCC (1949, 1950)

Career NBA statistics
- Points: 56 (3.7 ppg)
- Rebounds: 39 (2.6 rpg)
- Assists: 13 (0.9 apg)
- Stats at NBA.com
- Stats at Basketball Reference

Edward C. Gayda (May 11, 1927 – December 11, 2021) was an American professional basketball player. Gayda was selected in the second round (15th pick overall) of the 1950 NBA draft by the Tri-Cities Blackhawks after a collegiate career at Washington State. He played for the Blackhawks in 15 total games in 1951–52. In 2014, he was inducted into the Pac-12 Hall of Honor.

Following his playing career, Gayda went into private business. He died on December 11, 2021.

== Career stats ==
Legend
GP	Games played	GS	Games started	MPG	Minutes per game
FG%	Field goal percentage	3P%	3-point field goal percentage	FT%	Free throw percentage
RPG	Rebounds per game	APG	Assists per game	SPG	Steals per game
BPG	Blocks per game	PPG	Points per game	**Bold**	Career high

=== NBA ===
==== Regular season ====
Year	Team	GP	FG%	FT%	RPG	APG	PPG
1950–51	Tri-Cities	15	.413	.750	2.6	.9	3.7
