= Adolph Sieberts =

American basketball player (1893–1968)

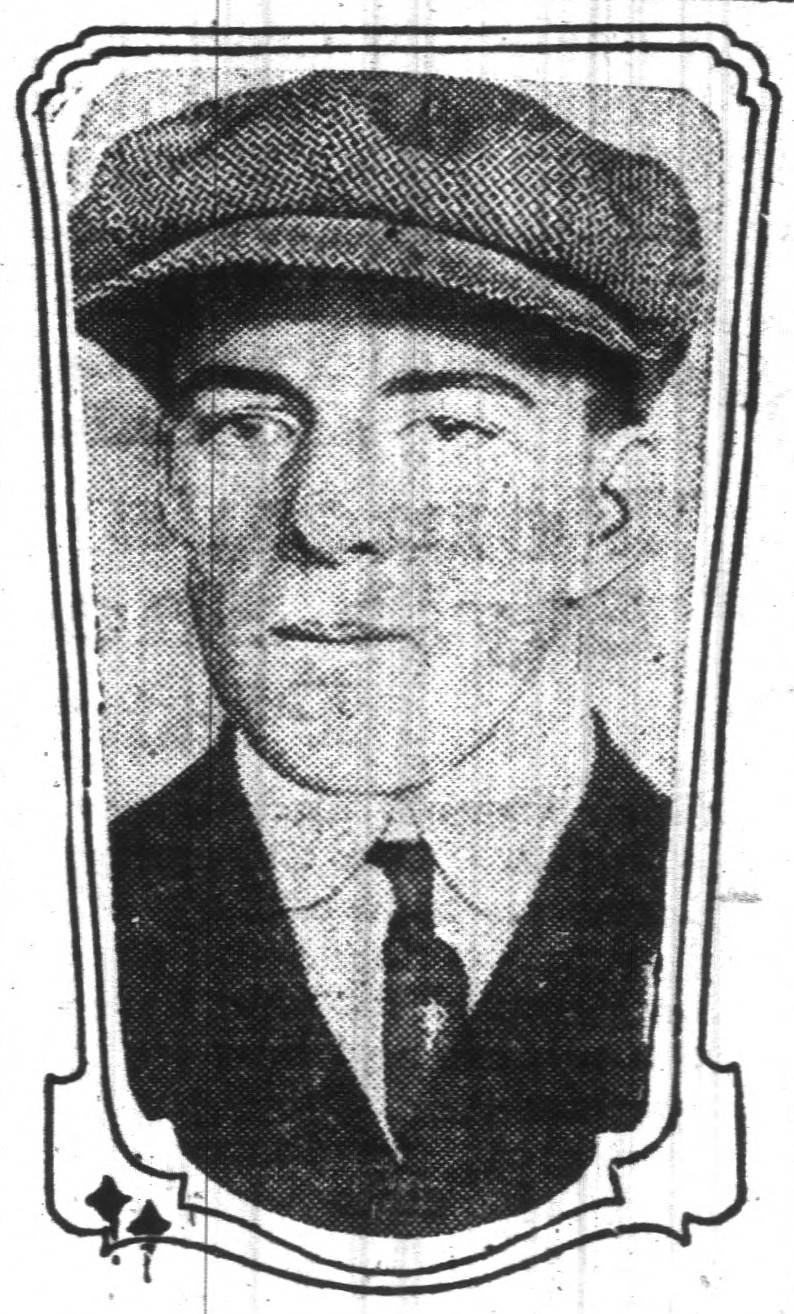
- Sieberts, circa 1915

Personal information
- Born: August 29, 1893 Portland, Oregon, U.S.
- Died: April 28, 1968 (aged 74) Portland, Oregon, U.S.

Career information
- College: Oregon State (1913–1917)
- Position: Forward

Career highlights
- Helms Foundation All-American (1916); 2x First-team All-PCC (1916, 1917)

Adolph G. "Ade" Sieberts (August 29, 1893 – April 28, 1968) was an American basketball player, most notable for a college career distinguished by his becoming Oregon State University's first All-American in the sport.

== Sports career ==
Sieberts, a forward from Portland, Oregon, went to Oregon Agricultural College (now Oregon State University) where he played basketball and baseball. As a basketball player, he led the Aggies to a Pacific Coast Conference (now known as the Pac-12 Conference) championship and was named first-team all-conference. He was also named an All-American by the Helms Athletic Foundation for his 1915–16 junior season.

Sieberts quit the Aggies' basketball team during his senior season to enter the business world. Despite this he was named to the PCC all-conference team for the second consecutive season.
