= Doug Smart =

American basketball player (1936–2019)

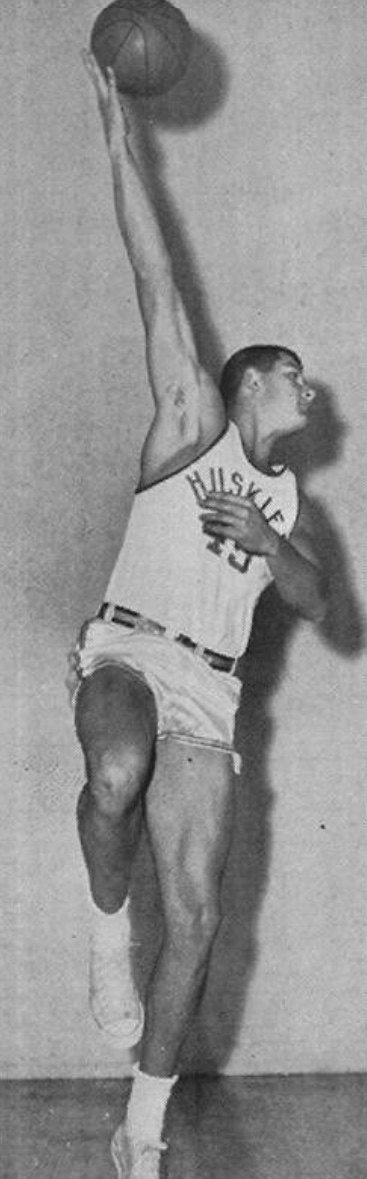
- Smart as a senior at Washington

Personal information
- Born: December 4, 1936 Seattle, Washington, U.S.
- Died: November 18, 2019 (aged 82) Seattle, Washington, U.S.
- Listed height: 6 ft 7 in (2.01 m)

Career information
- High school: Garfield (Seattle, Washington)
- College: Washington (1956–1959)
- NBA draft: 1959: 7th round, 48th overall pick
- Drafted by: Detroit Pistons
- Position: Power forward
- Number: 45

Career highlights
- Third-team All-American – UPI (1959); 3× All-PCC (1957–1959)
- Stats at Basketball Reference

John Douglas Smart (December 4, 1936 – November 18, 2019) was an American basketball player. He played college basketball for the University of Washington, where he was an All-American as a senior.

Smart was born and raised in Seattle. He played for Garfield High School, where he averaged 26.7 points per game and led the team to a state championship in 1955. Following the close of his high school career, Smart chose the hometown Washington Huskies for college. He was a three-year starter for coach Tippy Dye, averaging 18.9 points and 13.5 rebounds per game for his career. He was named to the All-Pacific Coast Conference (now Pac-12) team each of his three varsity seasons. He was an Associated Press (AP) honorable mention all three years and a third-team All-American by the United Press International (UPI) as a senior in 1959.

Smart finished his career as the school's all-time leading rebounder with 1,051 rebounds (since eclipsed).

Following his college career, he was drafted by the Detroit Pistons in the seventh round (48th pick overall) of the 1959 NBA draft. Smart decided against pursuing a professional career, instead becoming a dentist.

Smart died on November 18, 2019, at the age of 82.
