= Wayne Carlander =

American basketball player

Personal information
- Born: May 14, 1963 (age 63) Huntington Beach, California, U.S.
- Listed height: 6 ft 6 in (1.98 m)
- Listed weight: 220 lb (100 kg)

Career information
- High school: El Toro (Lake Forest, California); Ocean View (Huntington Beach, California)
- College: USC (1981–1985)
- NBA draft: 1985: 5th round, 99th overall pick
- Drafted by: Los Angeles Clippers
- Playing career: 1985–1987
- Position: Power forward

Career highlights
- Pac-10 Player of the Year (1985); 2× First-team All-Pac-10 (1984, 1985)
- Stats at Basketball Reference

Wayne Carlander (born May 14, 1963) is a retired American basketball player for the USC Trojans. A 6'6" power forward, Carlander finished his four-year career with 1,524 points and 767 rebounds in 116 games played. He led the Trojans in scoring for three straight seasons (1983–85) and, as a senior, was named the Pac-10 Conference Men's Basketball Player of the Year. He was also the team captain for his junior and senior years.

Carlander was drafted in the 5th round of the 1985 NBA draft (99th overall), but never made any NBA team's final roster. Instead, he played professionally in Spain for two years before returning to the United States to become a mortgage banker in Southern California.
