= Bob McKeen =

American basketball player

Personal information
- Born: November 30, 1933
- Died: December 31, 1999 (aged 66) Oakland, California
- Listed height: 6 ft 7 in (2.01 m)
- Listed weight: 220 lb (100 kg)

Career information
- High school: Piedmont (Piedmont, California)
- College: California (1951–1955)
- NBA draft: 1955: 4th round, 26th overall pick
- Drafted by: Rochester Royals
- Position: Center

Career highlights
- Second-team All-American – INS (1955); 3× AP honorable mention All-American (1953–1955); 3× First-team All-PCC (1953–1955); Second-team All-PCC (1952)
- Stats at Basketball Reference

Robert Van Sickle McKeen (November 30, 1933 – December 31, 1999) was an American basketball player, best known for his All-American college career at the University of California, Berkeley.

McKeen, a 6'7 center out of Piedmont High School in Piedmont, California, played for the Cal Golden Bears under coaches Nibs Price and Pete Newell. He was a four-year starter for the Bears, earning all-Pacific Coast Conference accolades in each of his four seasons. He was also named an honorable mention All-American by the Associated Press and a second-team All-American pick by the International News Service. McKeen left Cal as the school's all-time leading scorer (1,632 points, record since eclipsed) and rebounder (1,019). Years later, McKeen would be inducted into the Cal Athletic Hall of Fame and the Pac-12 Conference Men's Basketball Hall of Honor.

Following his college career, McKeen was drafted by the Rochester Royals in the fourth round of the 1955 NBA draft. After considering the minimal salary offered to him by the NBA, McKeen opted for a career in business instead. He obtained a Master of Business Administration degree from the Haas School of Business, then entered a career in real estate and local politics. McKeen died on December 31, 1999.
