= Earl Robinson (baseball) =

American baseball player (1936–2014)

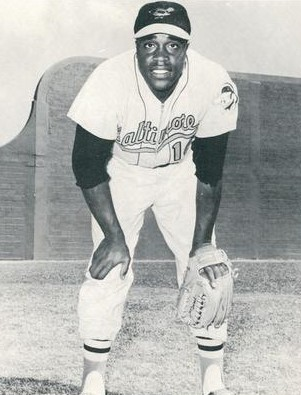
- Outfielder / Third baseman
- Born: November 3, 1936; New Orleans, Louisiana, U.S.
- Died: July 4, 2014 (aged 77); Fountain Valley, California, U.S.
- Batted: Right Threw: Right

MLB debut
- September 10, 1958, for the Los Angeles Dodgers

Last MLB appearance
- September 30, 1964, for the Baltimore Orioles

MLB statistics
- Batting average: .268
- Home runs: 12
- Runs batted in: 44
- Stats at Baseball Reference

Teams
- Los Angeles Dodgers (1958); Baltimore Orioles (1961–1962, 1964)

Earl John Robinson (November 3, 1936 – July 4, 2014) was an American professional baseball outfielder and third baseman who played in Major League Baseball (MLB) for the Los Angeles Dodgers and Baltimore Orioles. He attended the University of California, Berkeley, where he played both baseball and basketball, helping Cal to three straight conference titles in basketball from 1956 to 1958. Born in New Orleans, Robinson attended Berkeley High School in the San Francisco Bay Area before matriculating at Cal.

Robinson threw and batted right-handed, stood 6 feet 1 inch (1.85 m) tall and weighed 190 pounds (86 kg). He signed with the Dodgers in 1958, their first year in Los Angeles. After spending the minor league season at Class B Green Bay, he received an eight-game audition that September, including five starts at third base. He played errorless ball, handling 14 chances in the field, and collected three singles in 15 at bats. Robinson then spent both 1959 and 1960 in Triple-A. His contract was sold to the Orioles on December 15, 1960, the last day of the interleague trading period then in force.

He platooned with left-handed-hitting Whitey Herzog in 1961, as they shared the Orioles' right field job. Robinson batted .266 with eight home runs in 96 games. But in 1962, he lost his semi-regular job in mid-May and appeared in only 29 games all season. In his final stint with Baltimore, in 1964, Robinson was called up from Triple-A Rochester in July, and served as a backup left fielder and center fielder through the end of the season. He hit .273 in 37 games.

The 1964 season was Robinson's last in the major leagues. He appeared in 170 games played, and collected 113 hits, including 20 doubles, five triples and 12 home runs. He batted .268 with 44 runs batted in. Robinson concluded his pro career after spending 1965 at Triple-A in the Chicago Cubs' organization.

After baseball, he coached basketball at Cal, Merritt College and Laney College and taught classes at Laney and Castlemont High School. Rickey Henderson took a speech class taught by Robinson at Laney College to prepare for his induction speech at the Baseball Hall of Fame; the speech drew praise for demonstrating Henderson's humility.

Robinson was inducted to the Cal Athletic Hall of Fame in 1988. He was inducted into the Pac-10 Basketball Hall of Honor in 2010. Robinson died July 4, 2014, after suffering from congestive heart failure and two heart attacks.

During his years with the Baltimore Orioles, Robinson lived with his wife and two daughters in Castro Valley, California. He was survived by his fifth wife, Wilhelmina Cuenco Robinson, and daughters Michele, Monica and Mia Robinson.
