= Anthony Taylor (basketball) =

American basketball player

Personal information
- Born: November 30, 1965 (age 60) Los Angeles, California, U.S.
- Listed height: 6 ft 4 in (1.93 m)
- Listed weight: 175 lb (79 kg)

Career information
- High school: Beaverton (Beaverton, Oregon)
- College: Oregon (1984–1988)
- NBA draft: 1988: 2nd round, 44th overall pick
- Drafted by: Atlanta Hawks
- Playing career: 1988–1989
- Position: Point guard
- Number: 3

Career history
- 1988–1989: Miami Heat
- 1989: La Crosse Catbirds
- 1989: Ipifim Torino
- 1990: Saskatchewan Storm

Career highlights
- 2× First-team All-Pac-10 (1987, 1988)
- Stats at NBA.com
- Stats at Basketball Reference
Medals
Men's basketball
Representing United States
Summer Universiade
Silver medal – second place	1987 Zagreb	National team

Anthony Paul Taylor (born November 30, 1965) is an American former professional basketball player who was selected by the Atlanta Hawks in the second round (44th overall) of the 1988 NBA draft. A 6-foot-4-inch (1.93 m) point guard from the University of Oregon, Taylor played for only one year (1988–89) with the Miami Heat, their inaugural NBA season.

In his NBA career, Taylor appeared in 21 games and scored a total of 144 points.

== Early life ==
Anthony Paul Taylor was born on November 30, 1965 in Los Angeles, California. He was the youngest of five children raised by Rosemary Harrell. Harrell worked as a parole and probation officer for the Oregon Department of Corrections, later serving as an executive. The family lived in Beaverton, Oregon, and Taylor was friends with football player Anthony Newman since childhood.

== High school career ==
Taylor attended Beaverton High School. As a sophomore, Taylor was listed as 6-foot-3-inch (1.91 m), with The Oregon Journal sportswriter Paul Koberstein saying he "may be the team's best shooter." After a year described as not so good by Statesman Journal sportswriter Reid English, Taylor rebounded in his junior year in 1983. Standing at 6-foot-4-inch (1.93 m) in his senior year, he was linked to Oregon State University and its basketball team, having been spotted in the OSU locker room after several games. Early into his senior year, he had recorded single-game point totals of 34 and 38. English further described Taylor and South Salem High School's Scott Meinert as "two of the state's best major college prospects in the Class of 1984." Ron Jenkins of The Oregonian described Taylor as "a springy 6-4 junior (who) can post up underneath but is at his best in open court." At the conclusion of the season, Taylor was a unanimous inclusion in the 1983 All-State basketball team as selected by Eugene newspaper The Register-Guard.

Entering his senior year, Taylor was a highly-recruited prospect, and decided to make his college decision in the spring of 1984. He was recruited by both in-state Pacific-10 schools: Oregon and Oregon State, along with Arizona State and Washington.

== College career ==
Taylor chose to play for the Oregon Ducks of the University of Oregon, as he wanted to remain in state and close to his mother.

Taylor was inducted into the University of Oregon's Hall of Fame in 2004, and the Pac-12 Hall of Honor in 2015.

== Professional career ==
=== Atlanta Hawks (1988) ===
In the 1988 National Basketball Association draft, the Atlanta Hawks selected Taylor in the second round with the 44th pick. Projections following the draft showed Taylor as the Hawks' fifth guard. In rookie camp, Taylor was developed as a point guard, with head coach Mike Fratello complimenting his speed on the court. On October 6, the Hawks signed Taylor. Less than a month later, on November 3, Taylor was sent to waivers on November 2, along with forward Mike Gibson, during the Hawks' final roster cuts.

=== Miami Heat (1988) ===
Taylor was signed by the new expansion franchise, the Miami Heat, on November 7, the morning of the 1988 season-opener. Taylor started as the team's first or second guard off the bench in the early season, until a November 26 game against the Milwaukee Bucks in which he scored 21 points, a career high. The following day, Heat head coach Ron Rothstein chose to start him against the Cleveland Cavaliers. Taylor saw an increase in minutes after starting guard Dwayne Washington sustaining a groin injury in early December.

Despite being a guard, the Heat struggled offensively and employed him as a small forward occasionally. Teammate Scott Hastings said that Taylor had "as much raw talent as any rookie I've seen" in a piece with the Miami Herald in November.

Besides vastly improving the Heat's perimeter shooting, Taylor doesn't hesitate to drive, gaining some success with a running, one-handed shot. For someone whose weight fluctuates between 175 and 180 pounds, Taylor has given the Heat a presence near the basket.

— Shaun Powell, Miami Herald (December 2, 1988)

As a starter, however, Taylor shot poorly and soon relegated him back to a bench role. The Heat waived Taylor on December 26, 1988. He played 21 games for the team, averaging 17.5 minutes and 6.9 points per game. He totaled 144 points, 34 rebounds, 43 assists, and 22 steals with the team.

=== La Crosse Catbirds (1989) ===
On January 6, 1989, Taylor signed with the La Crosse Catbirds of the minor-league Continental Basketball Association. Turner appeared in 11 games for the Catbirds, averaging 4.3 points and 1.2 rebounds per game. He was waived on January 31 to make room for Andre Turner, who rejoined the team after a stint with the Milwaukee Bucks.

=== Ipifim Torino (1989) ===
In March 1989, Taylor signed with Ipifim Torino of the Italian Serie A2. He stayed with the team until the season ended in May, playing in 20 games. He recorded a season-high 37 points in one game during his time in Italy.

=== Saskatchewan Storm (1990) ===
The newly-formed Saskatchewan Storm of the World Basketball League invited Taylor to training camp prior to its inaugural season in 1990. Storm head coach Mike Frink recruited Taylor as an assistant at the University of Washington. On May 7, Taylor made the 10-man roster for the start of the season, and served in a bench role. Taylor was cut by the Storm on July 4 after averaging 6.3 points in 20 games for the team.

=== Associação Académica de Coimbra (1990) ===
With few opportunities in America, Taylor looked for further opportunities in Europe, ultimately landing in Portugal. He played for Associação Académica de Coimbra of the Liga Portuguesa de Basquetebol for a time beginning in 1990.

In addition to Portugal, Taylor played basketball in France and Hong Kong.

== Post-playing career ==
After his playing career, Taylor has been involved in numerous basketball coaching programs in the Portland, Oregon, area.

== Career statistics ==
Legend
GP	Games played	GS	Games started	MPG	Minutes per game
FG%	Field goal percentage	3P%	3-point field goal percentage	FT%	Free throw percentage
RPG	Rebounds per game	APG	Assists per game	SPG	Steals per game
BPG	Blocks per game	PPG	Points per game	**Bold**	Career high

=== NBA ===
==== Regular season ====
Year	Team	GP	GS	MPG	FG%	3P%	FT%	RPG	APG	SPG	BPG	PPG
1988–89	Miami	21	7	17.5	.397	.000	.750	1.6	2.0	1.0	.2	6.9
