= Russ Critchfield =

American basketball player and coach (born 1946)

Personal information
- Born: June 27, 1946 (age 80) Salinas, California, U.S.
- Listed height: 5 ft 10 in (1.78 m)
- Listed weight: 150 lb (68 kg)

Career information
- High school: Salinas (Salinas, California)
- College: California (1965–1968)
- NBA draft: 1968: undrafted
- Position: Point guard
- Number: 14

Career history

Playing
- 1968–1969: Oakland Oaks

Coaching
- ?–1975: Salesian HS
- 1975–1976: San Diego State (assistant)
- 1976–1977: San Ramon HS
- 1977–1985: California (assistant)
- 1985–1986: Campolindo HS
- 1986–1989: Saint Mary’s (assistant)
- 1989–1994: Washington (assistant)
- 1994–1998: Vintage HS
- 1998–2021: Butte College
- 2021–2026: Chico State (assistant)

Career highlights
- ABA champion (1969); 2× First-team All-AAWU (1967, 1968); Second-team All-AAWU (1966); California Mr. Basketball (1964)
- Stats at Basketball Reference

Russell Dean Critchfield (born June 27, 1946) is an American former professional basketball player and coach.

A 5'10" point guard, Critchfield played at the University of California, Berkeley in the late 1960s, earning team MVP honors in 1966, 1967, and 1968. He scored 1,437 points in his college career and was a first-team All-American selection in 1968. He was also selected twice to the All-AAWU first team (1967–1968). Critchfield was not drafted by an NBA team but was drafted by and played one season (1968–69) with the Oakland Oaks of the American Basketball Association. He scored 161 points in 47 regular season games and won an ABA Championship.

Critchfield was last an assistant men's basketball coach at Chico State University in Chico, California.
