= Andy Wolfe =

American basketball player (1925–2025)

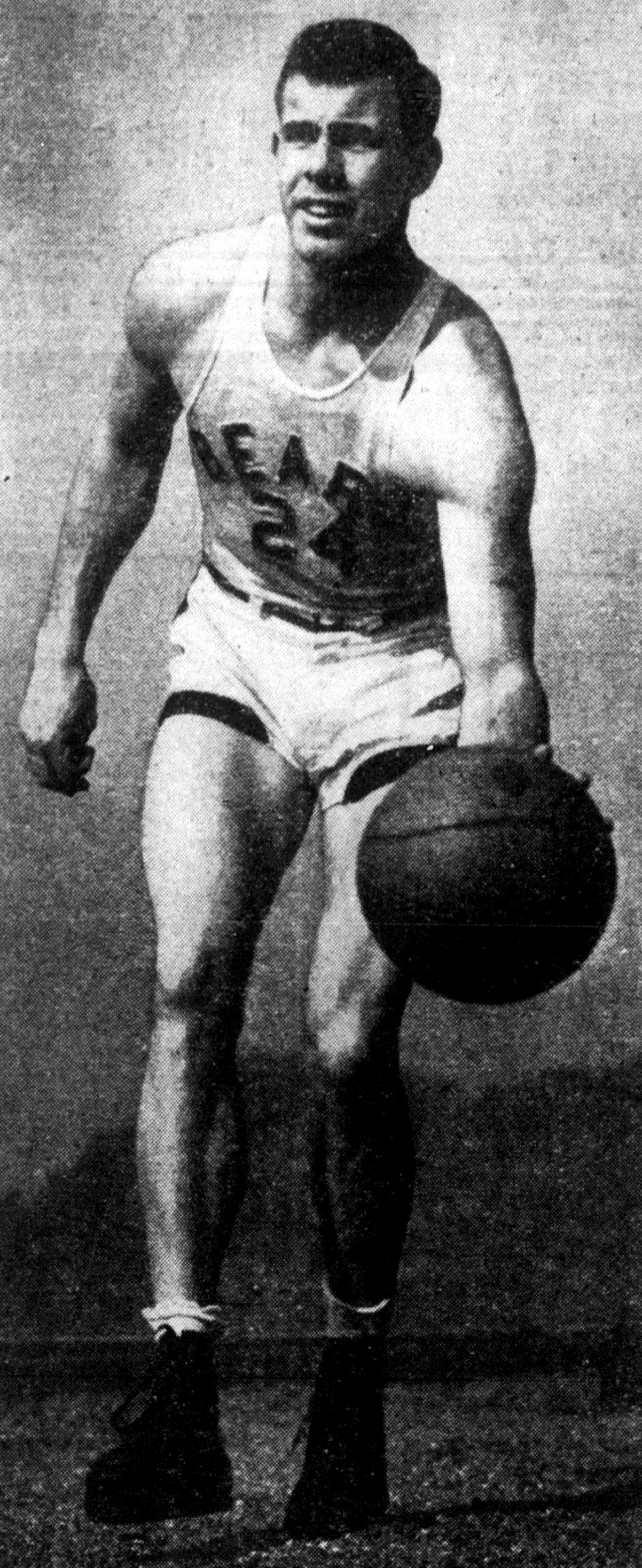
- Wolfe, circa 1947

Personal information
- Born: April 29, 1925 Martinez, California, U.S.
- Died: March 10, 2025 (aged 99)
- Listed height: 6 ft 1 in (1.85 m)
- Listed weight: 180 lb (82 kg)

Career information
- High school: Richmond (Richmond, California)
- College: California (1945–1948)
- BAA draft: 1948: 9th round, 99th overall pick
- Drafted by: Philadelphia Warriors
- Position: Forward / guard
- Number: 24

Career highlights
- Consensus second-team All-American (1948); Second-team All-American – Helms (1946); 3× All-PCC (1946–1948); California Mr. Basketball (1942)
- Stats at Basketball Reference

Andrew Paul Wolfe (April 29, 1925 – March 10, 2025) was an American college basketball player for the California Golden Bears from 1945 to 1948. As a sophomore in 1945–46, Wolfe led the Golden Bears in scoring at 13.4 points per game en route to the school's first-ever appearance at the NCAA Tournament Final Four. Cal lost to the eventual national champion, Oklahoma A&M, 52–35, however. During Wolfe's three-year California career he was named All-Pacific Coast Conference (PCC) every season as well as a consensus Second Team All-American as a senior. Wolfe became the first Cal player to break the 1,000-point threshold, finishing his career with 1,112 points while breaking the former school career record of 725 by nearly 400 points. His teams never finished lower than second place in the PCC South Division, winning it in 1946, and the school went 75–26 overall during that time. Cal's home crowd fans were so notoriously rowdy during Wolfe's era that he was once asked by the game's officials to get on the public-address microphone and calm them down, otherwise Cal would have to forfeit. Wolfe later said about the incident, "I didn't know if they'd listen to me or storm the court. Fortunately, they listened."

Wolfe was selected in the 1948 BAA Draft by the Philadelphia Warriors but never played professionally. He instead played AAU basketball for Stewart Chevrolet in San Francisco, California. Wolfe later earned his J.D. from the University of San Francisco School of Law, and practiced in Oakland for the rest of his life up until his retirement in the mid-2000s. He died after a brief hospitalization on March 10, 2025, at the age of 99.
