= Ed Lewis (basketball) =

Athlete

All-American Ed Lewis was allotted a full page in the 1933 edition of the OSC yearbook, illustrated in part by this drawing.

Edward Collins Lewis (August 13, 1910 – January 29, 2006) was an athlete from Portland, Oregon, who played basketball collegiately for Oregon State College from 1929–30 to 1932–33. A lanky center with good ballhandling, passing, and shooting skills, Lewis captained the team during his senior campaign and led the Pacific Coast Conference in scoring.

Lewis was named to the 1933 All-Pacific Coast Conference Team and the 1933 All-American Team. He was selected a member of the Oregon State Sports Hall of Fame in 1980. He was named to the Pacific-10 Conference's Hall of Honor in 2005.

Lewis' jersey number 25 is one of only five retired from use by Oregon State University.

== Biography ==
=== Early years ===
Edward Collins Lewis, universally known by the nickname of "Ed," was born August 13, 1910, in Seattle, Washington. He was raised by a single mother, Faye Beagle Lewis, spending his earliest years in San Francisco before moving with her to Portland, Oregon.

=== High school career ===
Lewis played center for Washington High School in Portland, where he garnered all-state honors as a Junior following the 1927–28 season. The team would win the Oregon State basketball championship in 1928.

Lewis' Senior campaign was interrupted, however, as he was sidelined by an injury early in the year which kept him out of action until the opening of the Oregon state high school basketball tournament in March 1929. Lewis immediately made his impact felt, chalking up 19 points in the opener for the Colonials in a 32 to 25 win over Wallowa High School.

Washington High's run came to an abrupt halt in the semi-final round, however, when the Astoria High School Fishermen scored a dramatic 26–24 upset victory in a defensive battle played in Salem.

Lewis finished the tournament with 64 points scored, leading all other scorers by a wide margin. After the season he was made a near-unanimous choice for All-State honors at the center position.

=== Oregon State College ===
Lewis played on the OSC varsity during the third, fourth, and fifth seasons in the tenure of Hall of Fame Coach Amory "Slats" Gill.

In the fall of 1929 Lewis entered Oregon State College (OSC) in Corvallis where he would play for young head coach Amory "Slats" Gill. With Freshmen prevented by rule from participating in varsity sports, Lewis cut his teeth with the Freshman team during the 1929–30 basketball season, establishing himself as the team's emotional and scoring leader. This year would be marred for OSC when second year coach Slats Gill fell ill immediately before conference games began, forcing assistant coach Dick Newman to take the helm at short notice.

==== 1930–31 season ====
Lewis' participation with the OSC varsity began in the 1930–31 season, which opened with two double-digit wins over the Multnomah Athletic Club, prompting the Portland team's coach to declare, "That's the greatest Beaver team I've ever seen." The OSC team returned talented Senior shooters Rod Ballard and Buck Grayson, but it was the addition of the 6'6" Sophomore center Ed Lewis that took the unit to the next level.

A preseason trip through California incurred only two losses and the Beavers started the Northern Division season hot, winning three out of four against Washington State and Idaho, but Lewis suffered a knee injury in a game against the University of Washington in Corvallis, forcing him to miss six of the last nine games and limiting his time to short minutes in the other three.

Oregon State faded without Lewis, with the rival University of Oregon rising up to beat the Beavers twice in a row, knocking them out of second place in the division. Washington would go on to win its fourth straight Northern Division crown, then knocking off the Cal Bears to win its first Pacific Coast Conference crown.

==== 1931–32 season ====
OSC Center Ed Lewis (R) and his counterpart from Washington State College, Huntly Gordon, February 1933.

The injury bug would again bite Ed Lewis during his Junior season. With the Beavers again making a long road trip to California in advance of the Northern Division season, Lewis broke his hand in a game against the University of San Francisco. Lewis managed to tape up and return to game action during conference games, with OSC building a 4 and 1 record before suffering painful losses to Washington and Oregon — the former in overtime and the latter by one point.

During team preparations for a road trip to Washington State and Idaho, Lewis hurt his shoulder in practice, an injury which was aggravated in the contest in Pullman — knocking Lewis out of action again. The Beavers once again faded late in the year, with only two consecutive victories over the University of Oregon to close the season keeping Lewis and the Beavers out of fourth place in the five team Northern Division.

Despite his injuries, Ed Lewis would finish the season tied for second in OSC team scoring with 123 points.

==== 1932–33 season ====
Ed Lewis as he appeared during his 1932-33 All-American season.

Ed Lewis' Senior season would prove to be an altogether different story. During the 1932–33 season Lewis was tapped as team captain by the Beavers and he led them to their first title in the Pacific Coast Conference since 1924–25. During this senior campaign Lewis led the PCC in scoring, averaging 10.4 points per game, and was selected as an All-American.

Former teammate and sports historian James Heartwell was effusive in singing the praises of Ed Lewis in making this PCC championship possible:

"Why was this OSC team a champion? Start with Lewis, a slender 6'5-1/2" All-American, who was the most inspirational leader, the quickest thinker, the best playmaker, and the best fast-breaking feeder Slats ever coached. In addition, Ed was also one of Gill's two best play breaker-uppers, ball-handlers, long shooters, fast-breaking scorers, and fast-breaking dribblers. He was one of the three leading natural players of Gill's coaching career."

=== AAU basketball ===
After graduation from Oregon State College, Lewis relocated to San Francisco, California, where he played AAU basketball for the Olympic Club.

In 1999, an aging Lewis recalled his game to a Salem news reporter with the following words: "I played like a point guard does now. I was clever with my hands, dribbling and feeding off, I had good peripheral vision and I loved to pass."

=== After sports ===
During World War II Lewis served in the US Army for two years, assigned to the Pacific front and spending most of his time stationed on the island of Luzon in The Philippines.

After the war, Lewis and his wife moved to Portland, where he went to work for the Associated Oil Company (Flying A). He would stay in the oil business for the rest of his working life, moving to Salem in 1956 to open the Ed Lewis Oil Company, a distributorship.

Lewis was married and had two children. He was an avid golfer and maintained a 17-handicap into his eighties.

Ed Lewis died in Salem on January 29, 2006. He was 95 years old at the time of his death.

=== Honors ===
Ed Lewis was named to the 1933 All-Pacific Coast Conference Team and to the 1933 All-American Team. Lewis thus became the first Oregon State player named a consensus first-team All-American.

In 1962 Oregon State established the Ed Lewis Award, an honor presented annually to the Oregon State men's basketball player that demonstrates the most leadership.

In 1980 Ed Lewis was named to the State of Oregon Sports Hall of Fame. He was named to the Pacific-10 Conference's Hall of Honor in 2005.

Ed Lewis' jersey number 25 was retired by Oregon State in 1999. It remains one of only five such retired by the OSU men's basketball program, the others belonging to Mel Counts, Steve Johnson, A.C. Green, and Gary Payton.
