= 1981–82 Kansas City Kings season =

NBA professional basketball team season

- Head coach: Cotton Fitzsimmons
- General manager: Jeff Cohen
- Owners: Leon Karosen; Robert Margolin; H. Paul Rosenberg
- Arena: Kemper Arena

Results
- Record: 30–52 (.366)
- Place: Division: 4th (Midwest); Conference: 9th (Western)
- Playoff finish: Did not qualify
- Stats at Basketball Reference

Local media
- Television: KSHB-TV
- Radio: KCMO

The 1981–82 Kansas City Kings season was the Kings 33rd season in the NBA and their tenth season in the city of Kansas City.

== Draft picks ==
Round	Pick	Player	Position	Nationality	College
1	7	Steve Johnson	PF/C	United States	Oregon State
1	17	Kevin Loder	SF/SG	United States	Alabama State
2	29	Eddie Johnson	SF	United States	Illinois
3	58	Curtis Berry		United States	Missouri
4	78	Kenny Dennard	F	United States	Duke
4	82	B. B. Davis	PF	United States	Lamar
5	104	U. S. Reed		United States	Arkansas
6	128	Brian Walker		United States	Purdue
7	150	Clinton Wheeler	PG	United States	William Paterson
8	173	Randy Smithson		United States	Wichita State
9	194	Mike Perry		United States	Richmond
10	214	Mark Wilson		United States	Fort Hays State

== Roster ==
1981–82 Kansas City Kings roster
Players

Pos.	No.	Player	Height	Weight	DOB	From
F	9	Kenny Dennard	6 ft 8 in (2.03 m)	220 lb (100 kg)		Duke
C	13	Leon Douglas	6 ft 10 in (2.08 m)	230 lb (104 kg)		Alabama
G	22	Larry Drew	6 ft 1 in (1.85 m)	170 lb (77 kg)		Missouri
G	1	Phil Ford	6 ft 2 in (1.88 m)	175 lb (79 kg)		North Carolina
G/F	20	Ernie Grunfeld	6 ft 6 in (1.98 m)	210 lb (95 kg)		Tennessee
G/F	8	Eddie Johnson	6 ft 7 in (2.01 m)	215 lb (98 kg)		Illinois
F	32	Reggie Johnson	6 ft 9 in (2.06 m)	205 lb (93 kg)		Tennessee
C	33	Steve Johnson	6 ft 10 in (2.08 m)	235 lb (107 kg)		Oregon State
F	51	Reggie King	6 ft 6 in (1.98 m)	225 lb (102 kg)		Alabama
F	30	Kevin Loder	6 ft 6 in (1.98 m)	205 lb (93 kg)		Alabama State
F/C	50	Joe C. Meriweather (injured)	6 ft 10 in (2.08 m)	215 lb (98 kg)		Southern Illinois
G	43	Hawkeye Whitney	6 ft 5 in (1.96 m)	235 lb (107 kg)		NC State
G/F	42	Mike Woodson	6 ft 5 in (1.96 m)	195 lb (88 kg)		Indiana

Coaches
Head coach
- Cotton Fitzsimmons
Assistant(s)
- Frank Hamblen

Legend
- (DP) Unsigned draft pick
- (FA) Free agent
- (S) Suspended
- Injured

== Regular season ==
=== Season standings ===
Midwest Division	W	L	PCT	GB	Home	Road	Div
y-San Antonio Spurs	48	34	.585	–	29–12	19–22	20–10
x-Denver Nuggets	46	36	.561	2.0	29–12	17–24	19–11
x-Houston Rockets	46	36	.561	2.0	25–16	21–20	17–13
Kansas City Kings	30	52	.366	18.0	23–18	7–34	11–19
Dallas Mavericks	28	54	.341	20.0	16–25	12–29	11–19
Utah Jazz	25	57	.305	23.0	18–23	7–34	9–21

#	Western Conference				
#	Team	W	L	PCT	GB
1	c-Los Angeles Lakers	57	25	.695	–
2	y-San Antonio Spurs	48	34	.585	9
3	x-Seattle SuperSonics	52	30	.634	5
4	x-Denver Nuggets	46	36	.561	11
5	x-Phoenix Suns	46	36	.561	11
6	x-Houston Rockets	46	36	.561	11
7	Golden State Warriors	45	37	.549	12
8	Portland Trail Blazers	42	40	.512	15
9	Kansas City Kings	30	52	.366	27
10	Dallas Mavericks	28	54	.341	29
11	Utah Jazz	25	57	.305	32
12	San Diego Clippers	17	65	.207	40

z - clinched division title
y - clinched division title
x - clinched playoff spot

== Player statistics ==
Legend
GP	Games played	GS	Games started	MPG	Minutes per game
FG%	Field-goal percentage	3P%	3-point field-goal percentage	FT%	Free-throw percentage
RPG	Rebounds per game	APG	Assists per game	SPG	Steals per game
BPG	Blocks per game	PPG	Points per game

Player	GP	GS	MPG	FG%	3FG%	FT%	RPG	APG	SPG	BPG	PPG

== See also ==
- 1981-82 NBA season
