= Jan Volk =

Former general manager of the Boston Celtics

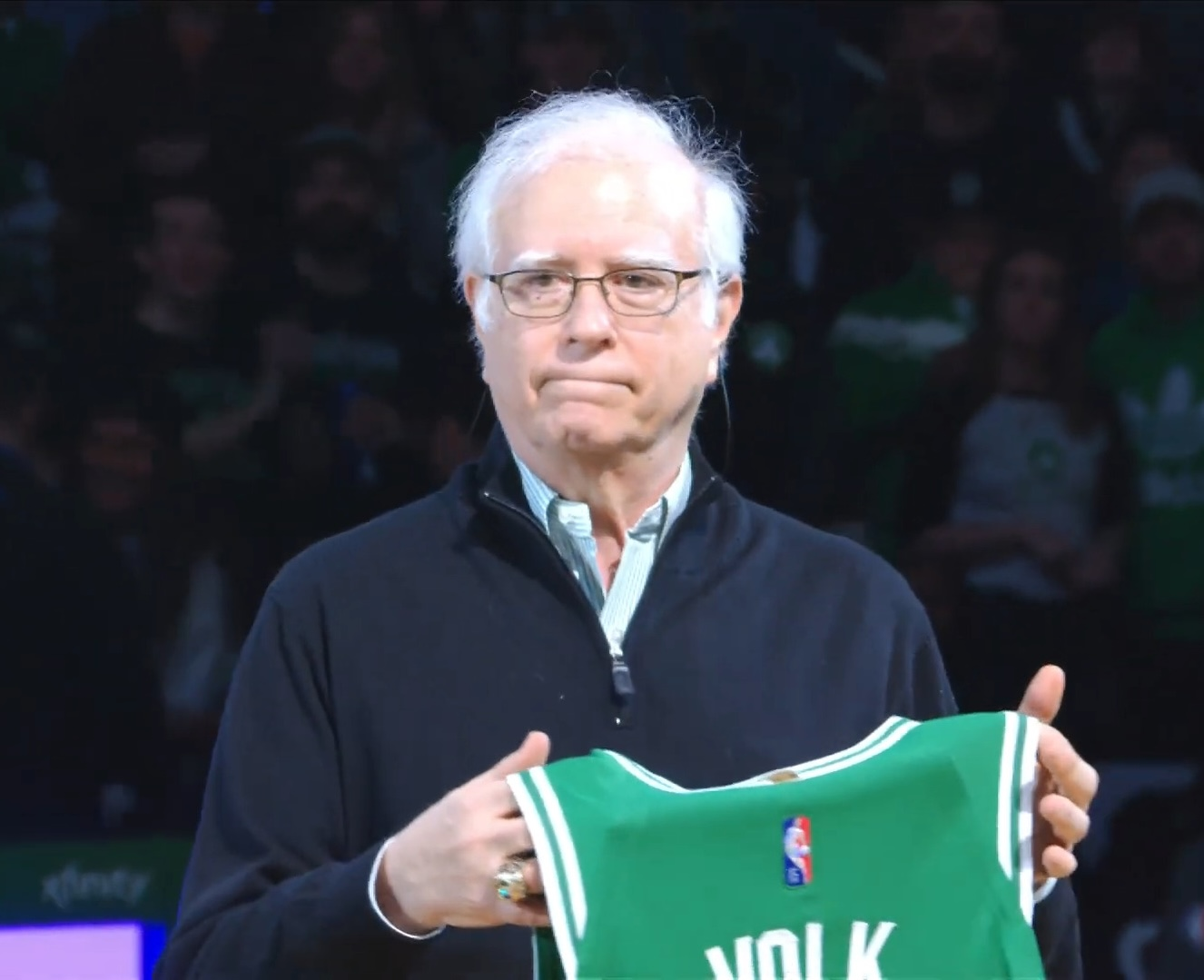
Volk in 2022

Jan Volk is a former basketball executive who served as the general manager of the Boston Celtics from 1984 to 1997.

== Early life ==
Volk was born in 1946 in Davenport, Iowa and grew up in Newton, Massachusetts. His father, Jerry Volk, started Camp Millbrook in Marshfield, Massachusetts, which was the site of the Celtics' training camp in 1960. Volk majored in English and history and played soccer at Colby College. He graduated in 1968.

== Boston Celtics ==
Volk joined the Celtics in 1971 after graduating from Columbia Law School. His early work with the team included ticket sales director, manager of equipment purchases, traveling secretary, business manager, and general counsel. In 1976 he was promoted to vice president. After assistant general manager Jeff Cohen left in 1981 to become GM of the Kansas City Kings, Volk was chosen to succeed him while remaining the team's chief legal counsel. When Red Auerbach announced that he would retire as Celtics general manager following the 1984 NBA draft, he designated Volk as his preference as his successor. On July 11, 1984, Volk was officially named general manager of the Boston Celtics.

Volk's first move as Celtics General Manager came on October 16, 1984, when he traded Gerald Henderson to the Seattle SuperSonics for a 1st round pick in the 1986 NBA draft. In his first season as GM, the Celtics had a 63–19 record and returned to the NBA Finals, losing to the Los Angeles Lakers in six games. For the 1985–86 season, Volk drafted Sam Vincent and traded for Bill Walton and Jerry Sichting. The Celtics won the NBA Championship, defeating the Houston Rockets 4–2.

Using the draft pick he obtained as compensation for Gerald Henderson, Volk selected Len Bias with the second overall pick in the 1986 NBA draft. On June 20, 1986, three days after the draft, Bias died of a cardiac arrhythmia related to usage of cocaine. Despite the death of their top draft pick, the Celtics finished the 1986–87 season with a 59–23 and appeared in their fourth consecutive NBA Finals, losing to the Lakers 4–2.

The Celtics were eliminated in the first round of the 1989 and 1990 NBA playoffs. On May 30, 1990, the Celtics hired Big East Conference commissioner Dave Gavitt to head basketball operations. Volk retained the title of general manager, but now reported to Gavitt. Gavitt was replaced by M. L. Carr after a 32–50 1993–94 season. Volk remained with the team until May 6, 1997, when he resigned so incoming team president and head coach Rick Pitino could hire his own general manager.

== Post-Celtics ==
In 1998, the Denver Nuggets hired Volk as a basketball operations consultant. He later served as a consultant to Atlanta Hawks owner Steve Belkin and taught a course in sports management at Tufts University. In 2001, he founded SportsPix, a company that photographs youth, high school, and college sporting events.
