= Gerald M. Levin =

American media businessman (1939–2024)

- Born: May 6, 1939; Philadelphia, Pennsylvania, United States
- Died: March 13, 2024 (aged 84)
- Education: Haverford College and University of Pennsylvania Law School
- Occupation: Businessman
- Spouses: Carol Needleman (m. 1959; div. 1970) Barbara Riley (m. 1970, divorced) Laurie Ann Perlman Rapke (m. 2003, divorced)
- Children: 5

Gerald "Jerry" Levin (May 6, 1939 – March 13, 2024) was an American media businessman. Levin was involved in brokering the merger between AOL and Time Warner in 2000, at the height of the dot-com bubble, a merger which was ultimately disadvantageous to Time Warner and described as "the biggest train wreck in the history of corporate America."

== Early life and education ==
Levin was born in Philadelphia, Pennsylvania, to a Jewish family of Russian and Romanian origins. His father was a "butter-and-eggs man" and his mother was a piano teacher. He lived as a child in the suburbs of Philadelphia, in Upper Darby and then Overbrook Hills. After graduating second in his class at Lower Merion High School, where he was named to the Honor Society, he attended Haverford College. He graduated from the University of Pennsylvania Law School in 1963.

== Career and later life ==
Levin spent most of his career with Time Inc. (later Time Warner, then AOL Time Warner), starting there in 1972 as a programming executive for the new Home Box Office (HBO) and eventually becoming CEO of the corporation after the ouster of his nemesis Nicholas J. Nicholas Jr. Interviewed by the journalist Nina Munk, Levin would later admit: "It is absolutely true that I plotted the departure of Nick Nicholas after working with him for 20 years. And I don't have any justification for it other than I am a strange person." Levin was best known for orchestrating the disastrous merger between AOL and Time Warner with Steve Case in 2000; the merger was at the height of the dot-com bubble and it destroyed $200 billion in shareholder value as the bubble collapsed. Following the deal, CNBC named him as one of the "Worst American CEOs of All Time". According to The New York Times, the merger is used by business schools as a case study of "the worst [deal] in history". In her book about the deal, Munk writes, "The disastrous merger...epitomizes the culture of corporate America and Wall Street in the late 1990s. It records the climate in executive suites, where as long as a company's stock price kept going up and up, a CEO was all-powerful, like a king with divine rights."

Whereas Levin had once been "perhaps the most powerful media executive in the world", he largely disappeared from public view after the collapse of AOL Time Warner. In 2007, he was reported by New York to be "presiding director of Moonview Sanctuary, a “holistic healing institute” with a full-time staff of fewer than twenty people" founded by his new wife, Laurie Ann Perlman, a clinical psychologist. In 2013, he was named chairman of a start-up called Elation Media, raising $150,000 of seed funding, according to Crowdfund Insider, to launch a "live and on-demand service" with programming topics that include "alternative medicine, world peace, visionary art, personal growth and the environment."

== Personal life ==
Levin was married three times and fathered five children. His first wife was Carol Needleman; they divorced in 1970. In 1970, he married Barbara J. Riley; they divorced in 2003. His third wife was Laurie Ann Perlman; they divorced in 2020.

=== Murder of Jonathan Levin ===
One of his children, Jonathan Levin, a 31-year-old high school English teacher at Taft High School in the Bronx, was murdered on May 31, 1997, during a robbery by one of his former students, Corey Arthur. The murder occurred after Jonathan had mentioned in the classroom that his father was Time Warner head Gerald Levin. Prosecutors said Arthur and alleged accomplice Montoun Hart, assuming that Jonathan was wealthy, stole Jonathan's bank card and tortured him to obtain the account's PIN, obtaining about $800 from the account. Arthur was convicted of second-degree murder and sentenced to the maximum allowed term of 25 years to life in prison in November 1998, with the judge concluding that Arthur had taken sadistic pleasure in the crime and shown no remorse. Hart was acquitted on the same charges in February 1999. While Hart had written a confession, jurors were not able to find out how it was obtained and felt it was unreliable.

Jonathan Levin High School for Media and Communications in The Bronx, New York City, is named after the murdered teacher.

=== Death ===
Levin died at a hospital on March 13, 2024, having been diagnosed with Parkinson's disease prior to his death. He was 84.

Business positions
Preceded by Steve Ross	Time Warner CEO; 1992–2002	Succeeded by Richard Parsons
