= Jazz–Rockets rivalry =

National Basketball Association rivalry

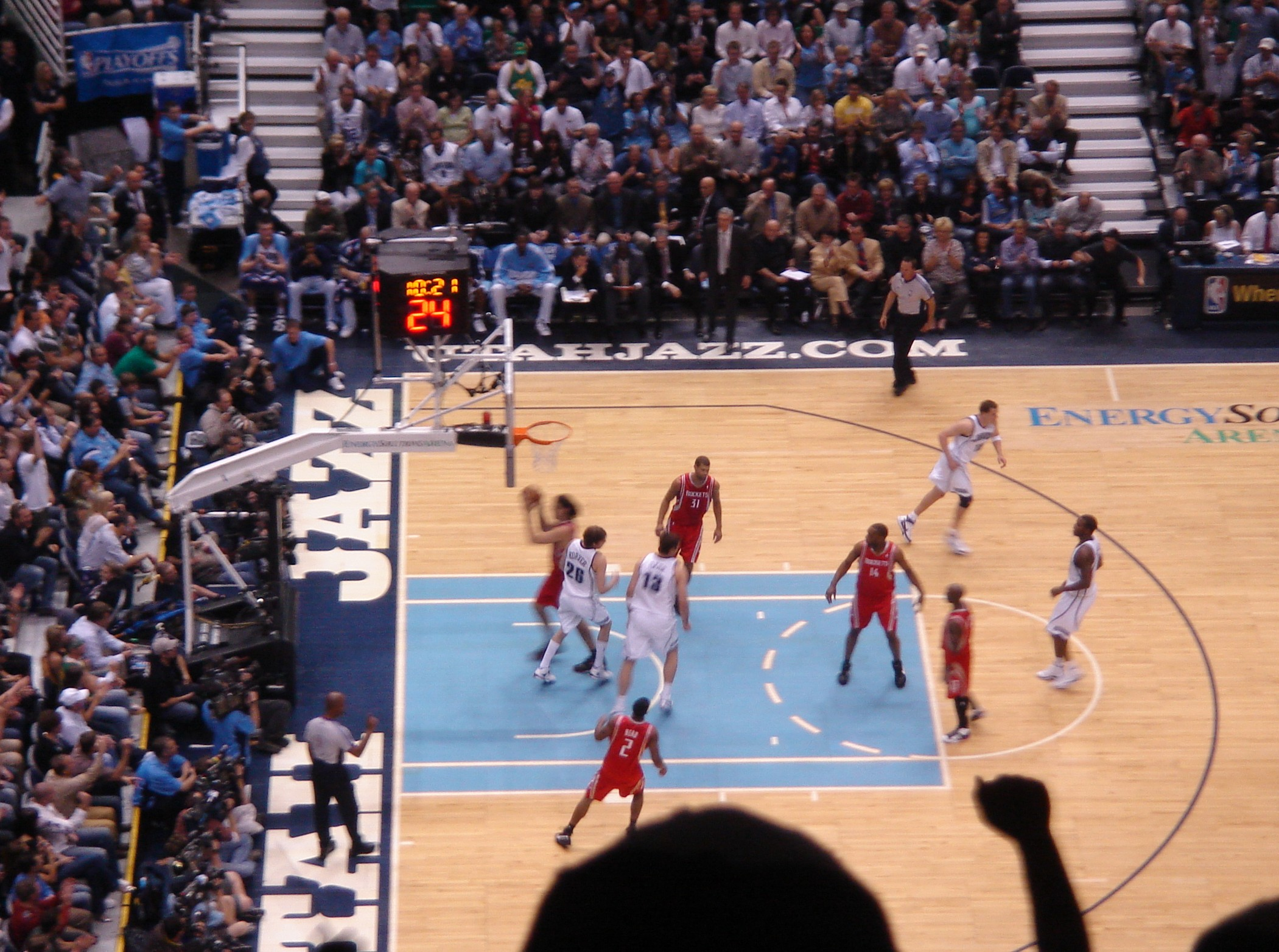
- Jazz vs. Rockets game at the EnergySolutions Arena during the 2008 Western Conference First Round

- Utah Jazz Houston Rockets
- First meeting: October 30, 1974; Rockets 113, Jazz 100
- Latest meeting: April 3, 2026; Rockets 129, Jazz 101
- Next meeting: November 13, 2026

Statistics
- Total meetings: 273
- All-time series: 140–134 (UTA)
- Regular season series: 117–108 (UTA)
- Postseason results: 26–23 (HOU)
- Longest win streak: UTA W12
- Current win streak: HOU W2

Postseason history
- 1985 Western Conference First Round: Jazz won, 3–2; 1994 Western Conference Finals: Rockets won, 4–1; 1995 Western Conference First Round: Rockets won, 3–2; 1997 Western Conference Finals: Jazz won, 4–2; 1998 Western Conference First Round: Jazz won, 3–2; 2007 Western Conference First Round: Jazz won, 4–3; 2008 Western Conference First Round: Jazz won, 4–2; 2018 Western Conference Semifinals: Rockets won, 4–1; 2019 Western Conference First Round: Rockets won, 4–1

Locations of the Utah Jazz and Houston Rockets.

The Jazz–Rockets rivalry is a National Basketball Association (NBA) rivalry between the Utah Jazz and the Houston Rockets. The rivalry began in the 1990s when the Rockets, led by dominant center Hakeem Olajuwon and college teammate Clyde Drexler, and the Jazz, led by the pick-and-roll duo of Karl Malone and John Stockton, were playoff powers in the Midwest Division. The teams faced each other four times in the NBA playoffs during the decade. In all four instances, the winner was the eventual Western Conference champion and played in the NBA Finals. In 2007, the rivalry was restored as the two teams met again in the playoffs and a showdown of two of the best 1–2 combos of Tracy McGrady and Yao Ming of the Rockets and Deron Williams and Carlos Boozer of the Jazz. In 2018, the rivalry was once again restored as the two teams met in the Western Conference Semifinals, where the Rockets won the series 4–1. In 2019, the two teams met once again in the playoffs, but in the First Round, with the Rockets once again winning the series 4–1.

== History ==
=== Stock, The Mailman, and The Dream arrive ===
The major players of both squads, Olajuwon, Drexler, Malone, and Stockton, were all drafted in the mid-1980s, an era in which many other great players were drafted, mostly in the same years as each other. Hakeem Olajuwon and Clyde 'the Glide' Drexler led the University of Houston's "Phi Slama Jama" squad to three Final Four appearances. Drexler was drafted in 1983 by Portland, and traded to Houston during their championship run. Olajuwon was drafted first overall by Houston in 1984. John Stockton, on the other hand, was drafted sixteenth by Utah from Gonzaga in the same year and was relatively unknown at the time. The Jazz pulled off another draft steal when they selected Karl Malone thirteenth overall from Louisiana Tech University the next year.

The first meeting in the playoffs between the Rockets and the Jazz was in the 1985 NBA playoffs. Houston, led by its "Twin Towers" of Ralph Sampson and Olajuwon, amassed a 48–34 record in 1984–85, earning a second-place finish in the Midwest Division and the third seed in the playoffs. Utah, tied for fourth in the Midwest with San Antonio, wound up as the sixth seed, reaching the postseason for only the second time in franchise history. Utah, with Stockton, Adrian Dantley, and shot-blocking center Mark Eaton (who won the shot-blocking title and set all-time league records for total blocks (456) and blocks per game (5.6), defeated Houston and its Twin Towers in 5 games despite losing Eaton to an injured right knee.

=== 1994 NBA Playoffs, Western Conference finals ===
The teams met in their first major clash with each other in the 1994 NBA playoffs. Olajuwon was widely considered not only the best post player in the league during an era of great centers, but ever since Michael Jordan's first retirement from the NBA, the best player in the league, winning both the NBA Most Valuable Player Award and his second consecutive NBA Defensive Player of the Year Award for the 1993–94 season. Along with Otis Thorpe, Kenny Smith, Vernon Maxwell, Robert Horry, Mario Elie, and Sam Cassell, the Rockets proved to be a force in the Western Conference. They won the Midwest Division Title with a record of 58–24. As the second seed in the Western Conference, they ousted the Clyde Drexler-led Blazers three games to one, but had trouble with Charles Barkley's Suns, who won the first two games in Houston. The Rockets won the series, four games to three.

The Jazz, with their established duo of Malone (who finished fifth in the league with 25.2 points per game and topped 19,000 career points to move into 25th place on the all-time list) and Stockton (who led the league in assists for the seventh straight season with 12.6 assists per game) and the pick and roll offense, also had Jeff Hornacek (acquired in a trade with Philadelphia for Jeff Malone), veteran forward Tom Chambers, and center Felton Spencer to complement the two leaders. The team posed a challenge to the Rockets for the Midwest Division Title when it won ten straight games from late February to early March and then eight of nine games to finish the season 53–29. Utah defeated San Antonio three games to one, but received a scare from the Denver Nuggets (the eighth seed that upset first-seeded Seattle in the first round) when a 3–0 series lead for the Jazz evaporated into a 3–3 series tie. The Jazz advanced to the Western Conference Finals for the second time in three years to face Houston.

The Rockets won the first two games in Houston, then the teams split two games in the Delta Center in Salt Lake City; the Jazz won the first of the two. Game 5 was held in Houston on May 31, 1994. The Rockets hit eight three-pointers in the first three quarters to build a 24-point lead, but the Jazz came back in the fourth quarter and cut the lead to eight. Robert Horry and Olajuwon made clutch shots down the stretch to win it for the Rockets, 94–83, claiming the Western Conference Title and sent the Rockets to the NBA Finals for the first time since 1986. The Rockets won the Championship against Olajuwon's old college rival, Patrick Ewing, and the New York Knicks in a 7-game series. Knicks home court hosted the New York Rangers' first Stanley Cup celebration in 54 years; the Rockets also denied New York City the distinction of having both NBA and NHL championships in the same year.

=== 1995 NBA Playoffs, First Round ===
The next year, the two faced off again, this time in the first round of the 1995 NBA playoffs. Houston struggled throughout much of the season, and finished with a record of 47–35 for the sixth seed in the West. On February 14, 1995, the Rockets traded Otis Thorpe to the Blazers for Clyde Drexler and Tracy Murray. An injury to Carl Herrera forced him to miss most of the second half of the season and the entire postseason and left the power forward position vulnerable. The addition of Drexler as a starter made former starter Vernon Maxwell frustrated enough to take a leave of absence. These issues provided fuel for critics of the Thorpe-Drexler deal.

The Jazz, ended the season on a high note with a record of 60–22, then a franchise record thanks partly to a 15-game winning streak on the road in December and January, the second-longest such streak in NBA history. The starting five of Malone, Stockton, Hornacek, David Benoit, and Felton Spencer, was solid, and the bench possessed key contributors in Adam Keefe, Antoine Carr, James Donaldson, Tom Chambers, and Blue Edwards. The major setback came on January 13, when Spencer suffered a torn left Achilles tendon, which took him out for the rest of the season and the entire postseason. Spencer was not an All-Star, but he was still crucial to the Jazz's championship chances because he was a big body who could hold his own against the great centers in the Western Conference, especially against Hakeem Olajuwon. With the second best record in the Midwest Division to the San Antonio Spurs, the Jazz ended up with the third seed in the West.

The Jazz barely won the first game in the Delta Center 102–100, but the Rockets beat the Jazz in Game 2 140–126 for a split in Utah. The series moved to Houston, where the Jazz won 95–82, going up in the series 2–1. The Rockets regrouped to win Game 4 123–106 to force a Game 5 at the Delta Center. In Game 4, Drexler scored 41 points while Olajuwon scored 40. Game 5 was a tightly fought contest, the Rockets defeated the Jazz 95–91, and eliminated Utah for the second straight year. The Rockets repeated as Champions, convincingly beating the Orlando Magic in the finals and are the lowest-seed to win the Championship.

=== 1997 NBA Playoffs, Western Conference finals ===
The two clubs met again in the 1997 NBA playoffs, this time in the Western Conference Finals. For the first time in franchise history, Utah finished as the top Western Conference team with a 64–18 record (the best in franchise history) and stormed past both the Clippers and Lakers before meeting Houston.

An off-season trade with Phoenix gave the Rockets Charles Barkley for Sam Cassell, Chucky Brown, Mark Bryant, and Robert Horry. Matt Maloney manned the point as the only first-year player to start in all 82 games. Other key acquisitions included veterans Kevin Willis, Sedale Threatt and Eddie Johnson to provide an already potent Rockets starting lineup a deep bench. The Rockets finished second in both the Midwest Division and the Western Conference with a 57–25 record and the third seed. The Rockets swept the Minnesota Timberwolves in the first round and then survived a seven-game series with the Seattle SuperSonics in the Western Cenference Semifinals, avenging last year's sweep. The Rockets advanced to the Western Conference Finals, where the Jazz were waiting.

Utah won the first two games at home in the Delta Center, while the Rockets responded at home with wins in games 3 and 4, thanks to the heroics of Eddie Johnson, who scored 31 points off the bench in Game 3 and hit a buzzer-beating, game-winning, three-pointer in Game 4 to even the series at 2. The Jazz won Game 5 at home. Stockton scored 15 of his 25 points in the fourth quarter to help the Jazz claw back from a 12-point deficit, including his most heroic effort at the final buzzer. After tying the game in the final minute, with time for one final offensive play, Bryon Russell made the inbounds pass to Stockton, Malone set the pick, and this forced Malone's man, Barkley, to try to guard Stockton. But Barkley was too late: though he managed to get a hand in Stockton's face, Stockton buried the three-pointer. This spectacular winning play was performed off Utah's signature play: the pick and roll. Stockton's 3 gave the Jazz a 103–100 victory over Houston and sent them on their first-ever trip to the NBA Finals, where they lost to the Chicago Bulls in 6.

=== 1998 NBA Playoffs, First Round ===
They met each other in the first round of the 1998 NBA playoffs. The Jazz finished tied with the best record with Chicago at 62–20, having swept the regular-season series against the Bulls, guaranteeing home court advantage throughout the entire playoffs. However, the eighth-seeded Houston Rockets, who finished with a record of 41–41 due to numerous injuries, nearly gave the Jazz a scare when the Rockets, led by Drexler's 22 points, won the first game in the Delta Center 103–90. After the Jazz won Game 2 105–90, the Rockets won a grinding Game 3 89–85, led by a team-high 28 points and 12 rebounds from Olajuwon. The Utah Jazz were now one loss away from becoming only the second first-seeded team to lose to an eighth seed. The Rockets looked poised to win the fourth game, but Charles Barkley received an elbow to his forearm, tearing a triceps muscle and ending his season. The Jazz won the last two games of the series over the shorthanded Rockets, ending the retiring Clyde Drexler's career.

=== Ending era and rivalry ===
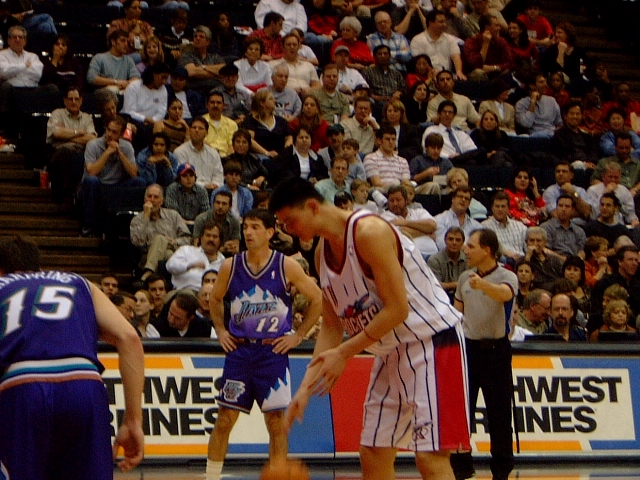
Yao Ming attempting a free throw against the Utah Jazz at the Compaq Center in 2002. John Stockton is seen on the background.

After the retirements of Drexler, Barkley, and Olajuwon, the Rockets did not return to the playoffs until 2004, when a team of Yao Ming, Steve Francis, and Cuttino Mobley faced the Lakers (the team which Malone joined the last off-season to try and win a title). The previous year, Stockton retired, the Jazz ended its twenty-year streak of postseason appearances. In 2007, everything changed.

=== The return of the rivalry (2007–08) ===
The rivalry was restored in the late 2000s when during the 2007 season, the Jazz were holding the fourth-best record in the Western Conference, but skidded and allowed the Rockets to have home court advantage during the playoffs. Pressure was on Rockets star Tracy McGrady with questions regarding if he could take the Rockets to the second round for the first time in his career. The pressure showed in Game 1 as he only scored 1 point in the first half with the Rockets down 9. He came out strong in the second half though as he scored 16 points in the third quarter and finished with 23 as the Rockets took Game 1 84–75. Game 2 was a similar story as Houston won 98–90 behind McGrady's 31 points and Yao's 27 despite Carlos Boozer's career-high tying 41 points. The series shifted to Salt Lake City and the Jazz finally found their groove as they took Game 3 81–67, despite another impressive performance from Yao and T-Mac. The Jazz then tied the series with a 95–85 victory in Game 4. The series went back to Houston for Game 5. T-Mac had one of the best performances of the series as he tallied 26 points and a career-high 16 assists as they took Game 5 96–92. McGrady was one game shy of winning his first playoff series. He had to wait as the Jazz took Game 6 94–82. The series shifted back to Houston for the crucial Game 7. Up to this point, the home team had won every game of the series. This would not hold up as the Jazz emerged victorious, 103–99. Yao and McGrady each had 29, but it was not enough to overcome Boozer's 35 as the Jazz came back from an 0–2 deficit for the first time in franchise history. The Jazz went on to the Conference Finals, but succumbed to the champion Spurs in five games. In 2008, the two teams faced each other again in the first round as the Jazz were the 4-seed and the Rockets were the 5-seed. The Rockets have homecourt advantage against the Jazz but they were playing without Yao Ming who suffered a stress fracture injury just months before the Playoffs. The Jazz took the first two games in Houston, and looked poised to sweep the Rockets at home, but the Rockets responded in Game 3, where in the final seconds Carl Landry blocked Deron Williams' shot that could have won the game for the Jazz. After the Game 3 loss, the Jazz responded in Game 4 and took a 3–1 lead. In Game 5, the Rockets outplayed the Jazz, but in Game 6, despite a 41-point performance by Tracy McGrady, the Rockets couldn't overcome injuries to starting point guard Rafer Alston as well as Yao and McGrady was unable to get out of the first-round again, falling for the second year in a row in the first round to the Utah Jazz. He would not play a game in the second round until 2013 despite the Rockets advancing in 2009, which McGrady missed due to a season-ending injury.

=== 2018 and 2019 playoffs ===
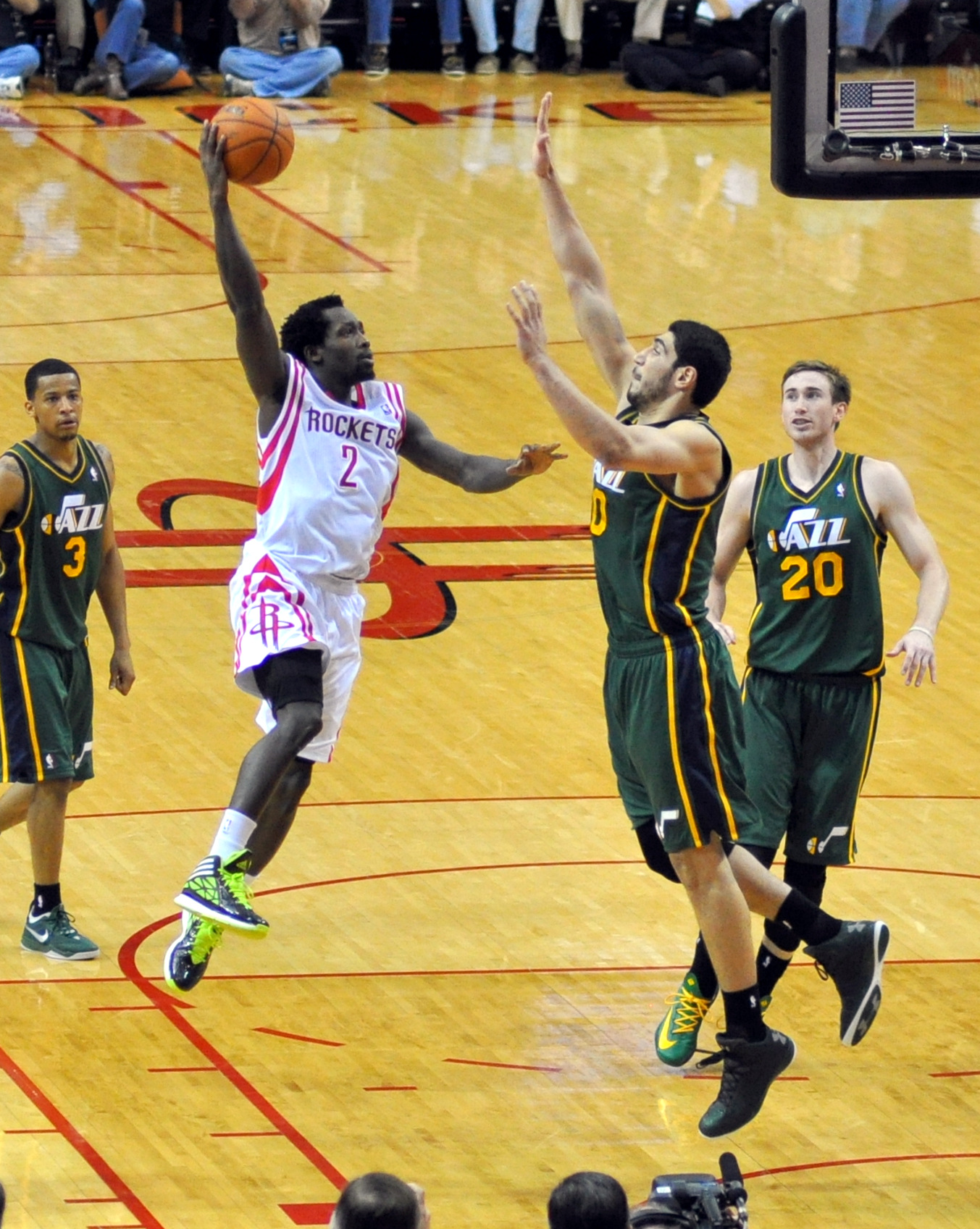
Patrick Beverley of the Houston Rockets takes a shot over Enes Kanter during an NBA regular season game at the Toyota Center in 2014.

Both the Jazz and the Rockets underwent a rebuilding process at the start of the 2010s. Carlos Boozer departed as a free agent, long-time Jazz coach Jerry Sloan resigned early in the 2010–11 season, and Deron Williams was traded away shortly afterwards. Meanwhile, Yao Ming's foot injuries led to his retirement after that season, while Tracy McGrady was traded away the season before.

Under head coach Quin Snyder and new additions Rudy Gobert and Donovan Mitchell, the Jazz returned to relevance by the end of the decade. The Rockets also returned to prominence behind James Harden, becoming a regular playoff participant since Harden's arrival in 2012.

Both teams met in the 2018 and 2019 playoffs. In the 2018 playoffs, Houston entered as the top seed while Utah made it as the fifth seed after eliminating the Oklahoma City Thunder in the first round. In the 2019 playoffs, Houston and Utah faced each other in the first round as the fourth and fifth seed. In both occasions, the Rockets eliminated the Jazz in five games, but were then ousted by the Golden State Warriors in the next round.

=== 2026 NBA Cup ===
Both teams are slated to face each other in the 2026 NBA Cup under West Group A, marking their first-ever tournament matchup since its inception.

== Season-by-season results ==
New Orleans/Utah Jazz vs. Houston Rockets Season-by-Season Results
1970s (Rockets, 16–12)

Season	Season series		at New Orleans/Utah Jazz	at Houston Rockets	Overall series	Notes
1974–75	Rockets	5–3	Tie, 2–2	Rockets, 3–1	Rockets; 5–3	Jazz join the National Basketball Association (NBA) as an expansion team. They are placed in the Eastern Conference and the Central Division, becoming divisional rivals with the Rockets.
1975–76	Jazz	4–2	Jazz, 2–1	Jazz, 2–1	Tie; 7–7	Jazz open Louisiana Superdome (now known as Caesars Superdome).
1976–77	Tie	2–2	Tie, 1–1	Tie, 1–1	Tie; 9–9	Rockets win their first and only Central Division.
1977–78	Jazz	3–1	Tie, 1–1	Jazz, 2–1	Jazz; 12–10	
1978–79	Rockets	4–0	Rockets, 2–0	Rockets, 2–0	Rockets; 14–12	Final season Jazz played as a New Orleans-based team.
1979–80	Rockets	2–0	Rockets, 1–0	Rockets, 1–0	Rockets; 16–12	Jazz relocate to Salt Lake City, Utah, open Salt Palace, and are moved to the Western Conference and the Midwest Division, no longer being divisional rivals with the Rockets.

1980s (Jazz, 34–30)

Season	Season series		at Utah Jazz	at Houston Rockets	Overall series	Notes
1980–81	Rockets	4–2	Jazz, 2–1	Rockets, 3–0	Rockets; 20–14	Rockets are moved to the Western Conference and the Midwest Division, once again becoming divisional rivals with the Jazz. Rockets lose 1981 NBA Finals.
1981–82	Rockets	6–0	Rockets, 3–0	Rockets, 3–0	Rockets; 26–14	
1982–83	Jazz	6–0	Jazz, 3–0	Jazz, 3–0	Rockets; 26–20	Jazz record their first season series sweep against the Rockets.
1983–84	Jazz	5–1	Jazz, 3–0	Jazz, 2–1	Rockets; 27–25	On December 15, 1983, Jazz beat the Rockets 138–111, their most points scored in a game against the Rockets. Jazz win 10 games in a row against the Rockets. Jazz win their first Midwest Division.
1984–85	Tie	3–3	Jazz, 2–1	Rockets, 2–1	Rockets; 30–28	Jazz and Rockets draft PG John Stockton and C Hakeem Olajuwon respectively.
1985 Western Conference First Round	Jazz	3–2	Tie, 1–1	Jazz, 2–1	Rockets; 32–31	1st postseason series.
1985–86	Tie	3–3	Jazz, 2–1	Rockets, 2–1	Rockets; 35–34	Jazz draft PF Karl Malone. Rockets win their first Midwest Division. Rockets lose 1986 NBA Finals.
1986–87	Tie	3–3	Jazz, 2–1	Rockets, 2–1	Rockets; 38–37	
1987–88	Tie	3–3	Jazz, 3–0	Rockets, 3–0	Rockets; 41–40	
1988–89	Jazz	4–2	Jazz, 3–0	Rockets, 2–1	Jazz; 44–43	On March 8, 1989, Jazz beat the Rockets 117–80, their largest victory against the Rockets with a 37–point differential. Jazz win the Midwest Division.
1989–90	Rockets	3–2	Jazz, 2–1	Rockets, 2–0	Tie; 46–46	

1990s (Jazz, 37–28)

Season	Season series		at Utah Jazz	at Houston Rockets	Overall series	Notes
1990–91	Tie	2–2	Jazz, 2–0	Rockets, 2–0	Tie; 48–48	Last season Jazz played at Salt Palace.
1991–92	Jazz	4–1	Jazz, 3–0	Tie, 1–1	Jazz; 52–49	Jazz open Delta Center. Jazz win the Midwest Division.
1992–93	Rockets	4–1	Rockets, 2–0	Rockets, 2–1	Tie; 53–53	Rockets finish with a winning record at Utah for the first time since the 1981 season. Rockets win the Midwest Division.
1993–94	Tie	3–3	Jazz, 2–1	Rockets, 2–1	Tie; 56–56	Rockets win the Midwest Division.
1994 Western Conference Finals	Rockets	4–1	Tie, 1–1	Rockets, 3–0	Rockets; 60–57	2nd postseason series. Rockets go on to win 1994 NBA Finals.
1994–95	Jazz	3–2	Tie, 1–1	Jazz, 2–1	Rockets; 62–60	Midway through the season, Rockets trade for Trail Blazers' Clyde Drexler.
1995 Western Conference First Round	Rockets	3–2	Rockets, 2–1	Tie, 1–1	Rockets; 65–62	3rd postseason series. Rockets go on to win 1995 NBA Finals.
1995–96	Tie	2–2	Tie, 1–1	Tie, 1–1	Rockets; 67–64	
1996–97	Tie	2–2	Tie, 1–1	Tie, 1–1	Rockets; 69–66	Jazz win the Midwest Division.
1997 Western Conference Finals	Jazz	4–2	Jazz, 3–0	Rockets, 2–1	Rockets; 71–70	4th postseason series. In game 6, Jazz's PG John Stockton hits the game-winning three-point at the buzzer to win the series. Last season Rockets held the overall series lead. Jazz go on to lose 1997 NBA Finals.
1997–98	Jazz	4–0	Jazz, 2–0	Jazz, 2–0	Jazz; 74–71	Jazz's first season series sweep against the Rockets since the 1982 season. Jazz win the Midwest Division. Jazz finish with the best record in the league (62–20).
1998 Western Conference First Round	Jazz	3–2	Jazz, 2–1	Tie, 1–1	Jazz; 77–73	5th postseason series. Game 5 was Rockets' SG Clyde Drexler final NBA game. Jazz go on to lose 1998 NBA Finals.
1998–99	Jazz	3–0	Jazz, 2–0	Jazz, 1–0	Jazz; 80–73	
1999–2000	Jazz	3–1	Jazz, 2–0	Tie, 1–1	Jazz; 83–74	Jazz win the Midwest Division.

2000s (Jazz, 31–20)

Season	Season series		at Utah Jazz	at Houston Rockets	Overall series	Notes
2000–01	Jazz	3–1	Jazz, 2–0	Tie, 1–1	Jazz; 86–75	Last season Hakeem Olajuwon played for the Rockets.
2001–02	Tie	2–2	Jazz, 2–0	Rockets, 2–0	Jazz; 88–77	
2002–03	Jazz	3–1	Tie, 1–1	Jazz, 2–0	Jazz; 91–78	Last season Rockets played at Compaq Center (formerly known as The Summit). Last season Karl Malone played for the Jazz. Last season for Jazz's PG John Stockton.
2003–04	Tie	2–2	Jazz, 2–0	Rockets, 2–0	Jazz; 93–80	Rockets open Toyota Center.
2004–05	Tie	2–2	Tie, 1–1	Tie, 1–1	Jazz; 95–82	Jazz are moved to the Northwest Division and the Rockets are moved to the Southwest Division, no longer being divisional rivals.
2005–06	Jazz	2–1	Jazz, 1–0	Tie, 1–1	Jazz; 97–83	
2006–07	Jazz	3–1	Jazz, 2–0	Tie, 1–1	Jazz; 100–84	Jazz record their 100th win against the Rockets.
2007 Western Conference First Round	Jazz	4–3	Jazz, 3–0	Rockets, 3–1	Jazz; 104–87	6th postseason series. Jazz become the third team in NBA history to win Game 7 on the road after the home team won each of the first six games.
2007–08	Jazz	2–1	Tie, 1–1	Jazz, 1–0	Jazz; 106–88	
2008 Western Conference First Round	Jazz	4–2	Jazz, 2–1	Jazz, 2–1	Jazz; 110–90	7th postseason series.
2008–09	Tie	2–2	Jazz, 2–0	Rockets, 2–0	Jazz; 112–92	
2009–10	Tie	2–2	Tie, 1–1	Tie, 1–1	Jazz; 114–94	

2010s (Rockets, 30–15)

Season	Season series		at Utah Jazz	at Houston Rockets	Overall series	Notes
2010–11	Rockets	2–1	Rockets, 1–0	Tie, 1–1	Jazz; 115–96	Rockets finish with a winning record in Utah and win the season series against the Jazz for the first time since the 1995 Western Conference First Round and the 1992 season in the regular season.
2011–12	Jazz	2–1	Jazz, 1–0	Tie, 1–1	Jazz; 117–97	
2012–13	Rockets	3–1	Tie, 1–1	Rockets, 2–0	Jazz; 118–100	On January 28, 2013, Rockets beat the Jazz 125–80, their largest victory against the Jazz with a 45–point differential. It was also the Jazz's worst home loss in franchise history. Rockets record their 100th win against the Jazz.
2013–14	Rockets	2–1	Tie, 1–1	Rockets, 1–0	Jazz; 119–102	
2014–15	Rockets	3–1	Tie, 1–1	Rockets, 2–0	Jazz; 120–105	
2015–16	Tie	2–2	Tie, 1–1	Tie, 1–1	Jazz; 122–107	
2016–17	Jazz	2–1	Jazz, 1–0	Tie, 1–1	Jazz; 124–108	
2017–18	Rockets	4–0	Rockets, 2–0	Rockets, 2–0	Jazz; 124–112	Rockets' first season series sweep against the Jazz since the 1981 season. Rockets finish with the best record in the league (65–17).
2018 Western Conference Semifinals	Rockets	4–1	Rockets, 2–0	Rockets, 2–1	Jazz; 125–116	8th postseason series.
2018–19	Tie	2–2	Tie, 1–1	Tie, 1–1	Jazz; 127–118	
2019 Western Conference First Round	Rockets	4–1	Tie, 1–1	Rockets, 3–0	Jazz; 128–122	9th postseason series.
2019–20	Rockets	2–1	Rockets, 2–0	Jazz, 1–0	Jazz; 129–124	Jazz finish with a winning record in Houston for the first time since the 2008 Western Conference First Round and the 2007 season in the regular season.

2020s (Jazz, 11–10)

Season	Season series		at Utah Jazz	at Houston Rockets	Overall series	Notes
2020–21	Jazz	3–0	Jazz, 2–0	Jazz, 1–0	Jazz; 132–124	Jazz's first season series sweep against the Rockets since the 1998 season. Jazz finish with the best record in the league (52–20).
2021–22	Jazz	3–1	Tie, 1–1	Jazz, 2–0	Jazz; 135–125	
2022–23	Jazz	2–1	Jazz, 1–0	Tie, 1–1	Jazz; 137–126	
2023–24	Rockets	3–1	Tie, 1–1	Rockets, 2–0	Jazz; 138–129	On March 23, 2024, Rockets beat the Jazz 147–119, their most points scored in a game against the Jazz.
2024–25	Rockets	2–1	Tie, 1–1	Rockets, 1–0	Jazz; 139–131	
2025–26	Rockets	3–1	Tie, 1–1	Rockets, 2–0	Jazz; 140–134	
2026–27	Tie	0-0	February 9th, and March 10th, 2027	November 13th, 2026 and February 3rd, 2027	Jazz; 140–134	The game at Houston on November 13, 2026, is a 2026 NBA Cup group stage game.

Summary of Results

Season	Season series		at New Orleans/Utah Jazz	at Houston Rockets	Notes
Regular season games	Jazz	117–108	Jazz, 73–40	Rockets, 68–44	
Postseason games	Rockets	26–23	Jazz, 14–9	Rockets, 17–9	
Postseason series	Jazz	5–4	Jazz, 2–1	Tie, 3–3	Western Conference First Round: 1985, 1995, 1998, 2007, 2008, 2019; Western Conference Semifinals: 2018; Western Conference Finals: 1994, 1997
Regular and postseason	Jazz	140–134	Jazz, 87–49	Rockets, 85–53	Rockets have a 7–6 record in New Orleans. Jazz currently have a 66–33 record in Salt Lake City, Utah.
