= 1981 NBA draft =

Basketball player selection

General information
- Sport: Basketball
- Date: June 9, 1981
- Location: Grand Hyatt Hotel (New York City, New York)
- Network: USA Network

Overview
- 223 total selections in 10 rounds
- League: NBA
- First selection: Mark Aguirre, Dallas Mavericks
- Hall of Famers: 1: G Isiah Thomas

The 1981 NBA draft was the 35th annual draft of the National Basketball Association (NBA). The draft was held on June 9, 1981, before the 1981–82 season. The draft was broadcast in the United States on the USA Network. In this draft, 23 NBA teams took turns selecting amateur U.S. college basketball players and other eligible players, including international players. The first two picks in the draft belonged to the teams that finished last in each conference, with the order determined by a coin flip. The Dallas Mavericks won the coin flip and were awarded the first overall pick, while the Detroit Pistons were awarded the second pick. The remaining first-round picks and the subsequent rounds were assigned to teams in reverse order of their win–loss record in the previous season. A player who had finished his four-year college eligibility was automatically eligible for selection. Before the draft, five college underclassmen announced that they would leave college early and would be eligible for selection. The draft consisted of 10 rounds comprising the selection of 223 players.

The Dallas Mavericks used their first pick to draft 1980 Naismith College Player of the Year Mark Aguirre from DePaul University. Aguirre, who had just finished his junior season in college, became the second underclassman to be drafted first overall, after Magic Johnson in 1979. The Detroit Pistons used the second overall pick to draft Isiah Thomas, a sophomore guard from Indiana University. Thomas had just won the 1981 National Collegiate Athletic Association (NCAA) Championship with Indiana and was named as the tournament's Most Outstanding Player. The New Jersey Nets used the third pick to draft another underclassman, Buck Williams, from the University of Maryland. Williams went on to win the Rookie of the Year Award and was also selected to the All-Star Game in his rookie season. This draft marked the first time that the first three selections were college underclassmen. Danny Ainge, the 1981 Wooden College Player of the Year, was selected in the second round with the 31st pick by the Boston Celtics. Ainge had been playing professional baseball since 1979 with the Toronto Blue Jays in the Major League Baseball (MLB) while also playing college basketball at Brigham Young University. He reportedly preferred to continue his baseball career, but the Celtics successfully persuaded him to play basketball instead. He is one of only twelve athletes who have played in both the NBA and MLB.

== Key ==
Pos.	G	F	C
Position	Guard	Forward	Center

^	Denotes player who has been inducted to the Naismith Memorial Basketball Hall of Fame
*	Denotes player who has been selected for at least one All-Star Game and All-NBA Team
^{+}	Denotes player who has been selected for at least one All-Star Game
^{x}	Denotes player who has been selected for at least one All-NBA Team
^{#}	Denotes player who has never appeared in an NBA regular-season or playoff game
^{~}	Denotes player who has been selected as Rookie of the Year

== Draft ==
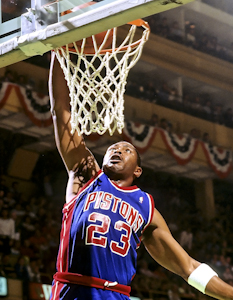
Mark Aguirre was selected first overall by the Dallas Mavericks.

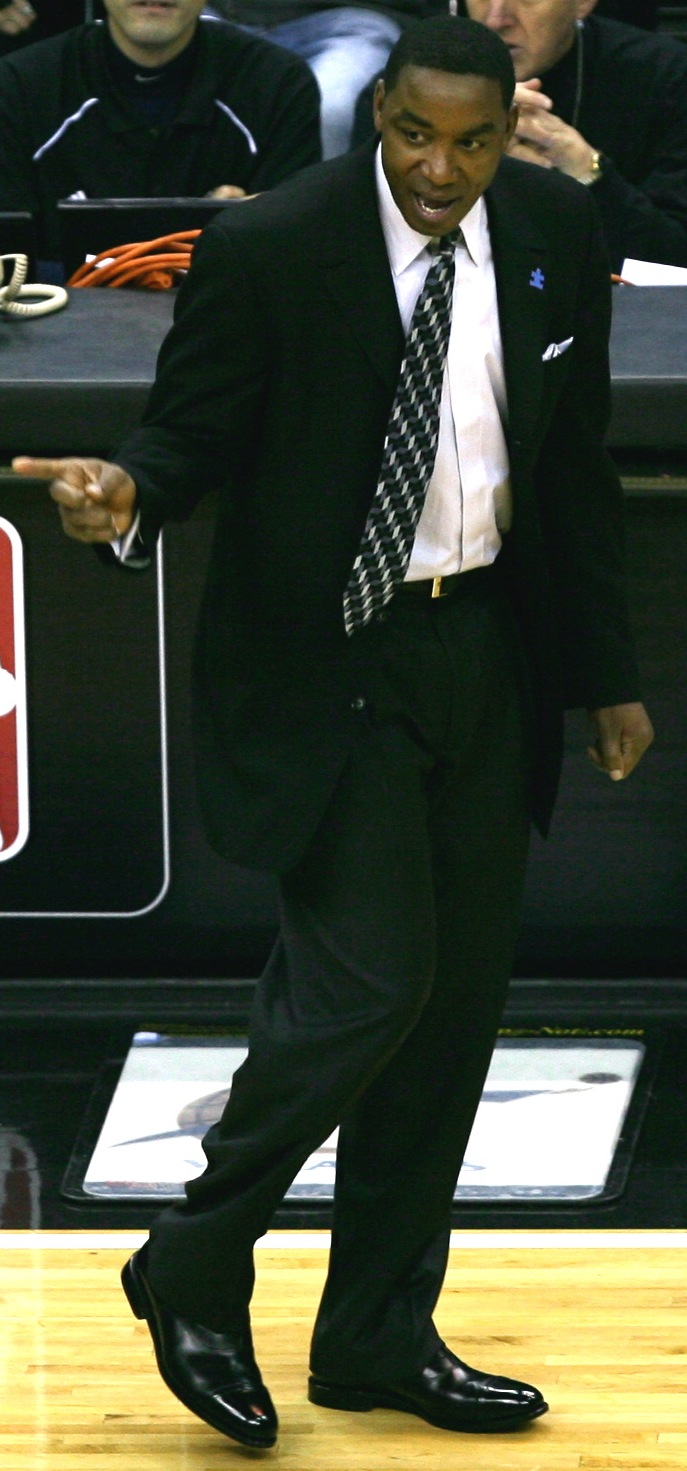
Isiah Thomas was selected second overall by the Detroit Pistons.

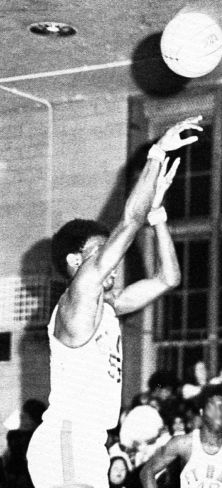
Albert King was selected 10th overall by the New Jersey Nets.

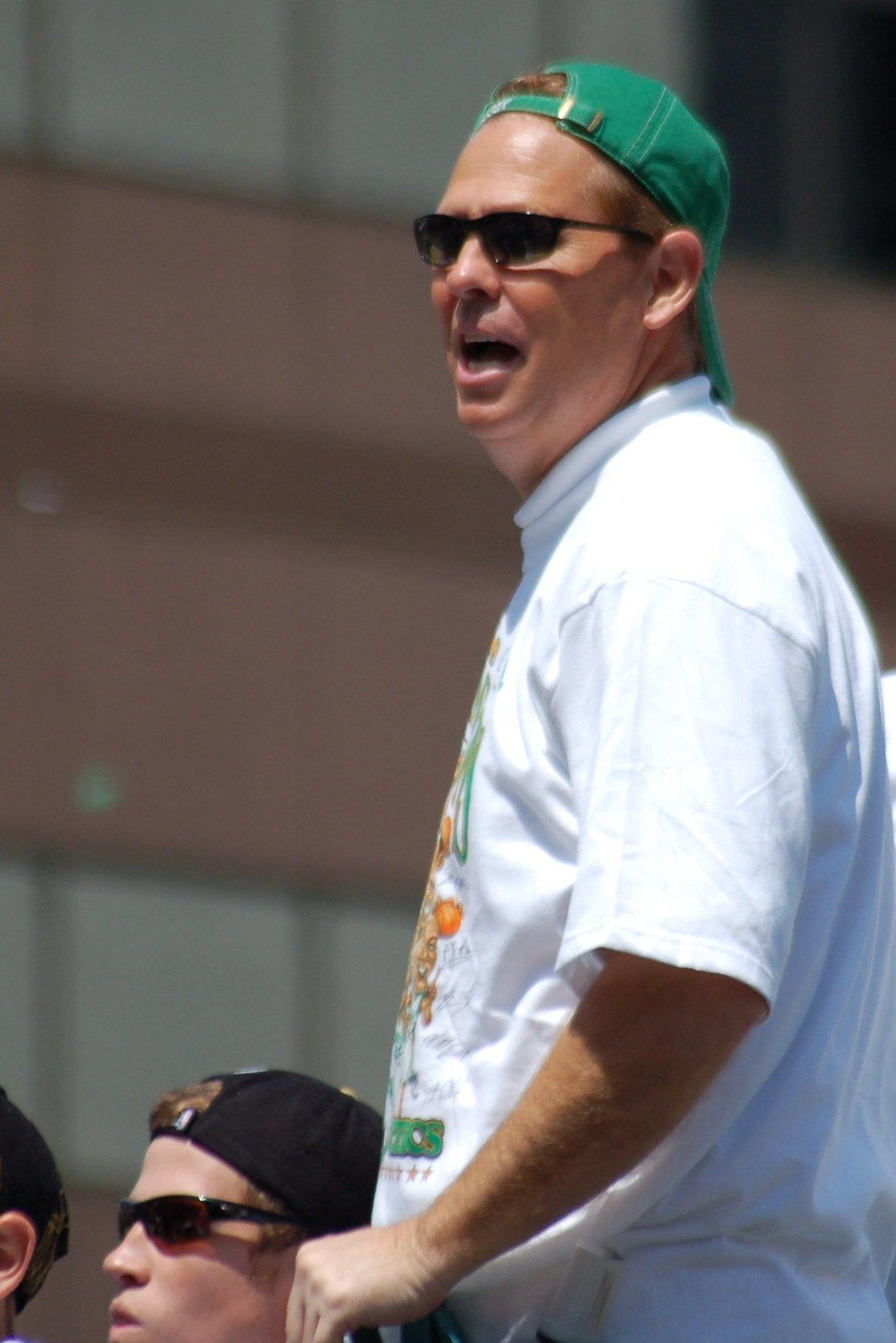
Danny Ainge was selected 31st overall by the Boston Celtics.

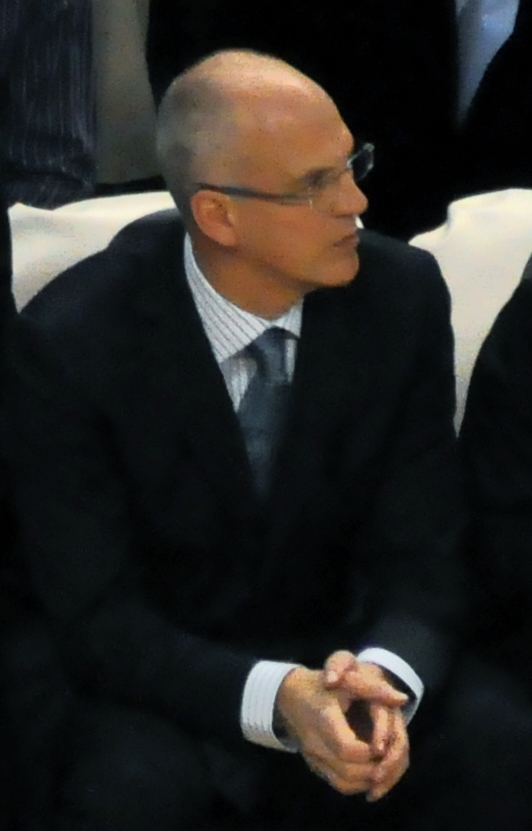
Jay Triano, the 179th pick, never played in the NBA but was the head coach of NBA team Toronto Raptors from 2008 to 2011 and has coached in the NBA since 2002.

Rnd.	Pick	Player	Pos.	Nationality (Note: Nationality indicates the player's national team or representative nationality. If a player has not competed at the international level, then the nationality indicates the national team which the player is eligible to represent according to FIBA rules.)	Team	School / club team
1	1	Mark Aguirre^{+}	G/F	United States	Dallas Mavericks	DePaul (Jr.)
1	2	Isiah Thomas^	G	United States	Detroit Pistons	Indiana (So.)
1	3	Buck Williams*~	F/C	United States	New Jersey Nets	Maryland (Jr.)
1	4	Al Wood	G/F	United States	Atlanta Hawks (from Cleveland via Philadelphia, Portland and Chicago)^{[a]}	North Carolina (Sr.)
1	5	Danny Vranes	F	United States	Seattle SuperSonics (from Utah)^{[b]}	Utah (Sr.)
1	6	Orlando Woolridge	F	United States	Chicago Bulls (from Atlanta)^{[a]}	Notre Dame (Sr.)
1	7	Steve Johnson^{+}	F/C	United States	Kansas City Kings (from Seattle via New York)^{[c]}	Oregon State (Sr.)
1	8	Tom Chambers*	F/C	United States	San Diego Clippers	Utah (Sr.)
1	9	Rolando Blackman^{+}	G	United States (Note: Rolando Blackman was born in Panama, but grew up in the United States and has represented the United States national team.)	Dallas Mavericks (from Denver)^{[d]}	Kansas State (Sr.)
1	10	Albert King	G/F	United States	New Jersey Nets (from Golden State via Portland)^{[e]}	Maryland (Sr.)
1	11	Frank Johnson	G	United States	Washington Bullets	Wake Forest (Sr.)
1	12	Kelly Tripucka^{+}	G/F	United States	Detroit Pistons (from Kansas City)^{[f]}	Notre Dame (Sr.)
1	13	Danny Schayes	F/C	United States	Utah Jazz (from Houston)^{[g]}	Syracuse (Sr.)
1	14	Herb Williams	F/C	United States	Indiana Pacers	Ohio State (Sr.)
1	15	Jeff Lamp	G/F	United States	Portland Trail Blazers	Virginia (Sr.)
1	16	Darnell Valentine	G	United States	Portland Trail Blazers (from Chicago)^{[a]}	Kansas (Sr.)
1	17	Kevin Loder	G/F	United States	Kansas City Kings (from New York via Cleveland)^{[h]}	Alabama State (Sr.)
1	18	Ray Tolbert	F	United States	New Jersey Nets (from San Antonio)^{[i]}	Indiana (Sr.)
1	19	Mike McGee	G/F	United States	Los Angeles Lakers	Michigan (Sr.)
1	20	Larry Nance^{+}	F/C	United States	Phoenix Suns	Clemson (Sr.)
1	21	Alton Lister	F/C	United States	Milwaukee Bucks	Arizona State(Sr.)
1	22	Franklin Edwards	G	United States	Philadelphia 76ers	Cleveland State (Sr.)
1	23	Charles Bradley	G	United States	Boston Celtics	Wyoming (Sr.)
2	24	Jay Vincent	F	United States	Dallas Mavericks	Michigan State (Sr.)
2	25	Tracy Jackson	G/F	United States	Boston Celtics (from Detroit)^{[j]}	Notre Dame (Sr.)
2	26	Brian Jackson^{#}	F	United States	Portland Trail Blazers (from New Jersey via Indiana)^{[k]}	Utah State (Sr.)
2	27	Howard Wood	F	United States	Utah Jazz	Tennessee (Sr.)
2	28	Gene Banks	G/F	United States	San Antonio Spurs (from Cleveland via Los Angeles and Chicago)^{[l]}	Duke (Sr.)
2	29	Eddie Johnson	G/F	United States	Kansas City Kings (from Atlanta)^{[m]}	Illinois (Sr.)
2	30	Ed Rains	F	United States	San Antonio Spurs (from Seattle via Chicago)^{[l]}	South Alabama (Sr.)
2	31	Danny Ainge^{+}	G/F	United States	Boston Celtics (from San Diego)^{[n]}	Brigham Young (Sr.)
2	32	Mike Olliver^{#}	G	United States	Chicago Bulls (from Denver,^{[o]} traded to Indiana)^{[A]}	Lamar (Sr.)
2	33	Sam Williams	F	United States	Golden State Warriors (from Washington)^{[p]}	Arizona State (Sr.)
2	34	Ken Green	F	United States	Denver Nuggets (from Golden State via Utah)^{[q]}	Pan American (Sr.)
2	35	Charles Davis	F	United States	Washington Bullets (from Houston)^{[r]}	Vanderbilt (Sr.)
2	36	Ray Blume	G	United States	Indiana Pacers (from Kansas City via Cleveland,^{[h]} traded to Chicago)^{[A]}	Oregon State (Sr.)
2	37	Al Leslie^{#}	G	United States	Indiana Pacers	Bucknell (Sr.)
2	38	Clyde Bradshaw^{#}	G	United States	Atlanta Hawks (from Chicago)^{[a]}	DePaul (Sr.)
2	39	Harvey Knuckles^{#}	F	United States	Los Angeles Lakers (from Portland via Detroit)^{[s]}	Toledo (Sr.)
2	40	Greg Cook^{#}	F	United States	New York Knicks	LSU (Sr.)
2	41	Claude Gregory	F	United States	Washington Bullets (from San Antonio)^{[t]}	Wisconsin (Sr.)
2	42	Elvis Rolle^{#}	F/C	Bahamas	Los Angeles Lakers	Florida State (Sr.)
2	43	Elston Turner	G/F	United States	Dallas Mavericks (from Phoenix)^{[u]}	Mississippi (Sr.)
2	44	Steve Lingenfelter	F	United States	Washington Bullets (from Milwaukee via Kansas City and New Jersey)^{[v]}	South Dakota State (Sr.)
2	45	Ed Turner^{#}	F	United States	Houston Rockets (from Boston)^{[w]}	Texas A&I (Sr.)
2	46	Vernon Smith^{#}	F	United States	Philadelphia 76ers	Texas A&M (Sr.)
3	47	Art Housey^{#}	C	United States	Dallas Mavericks	Kansas (Sr.)
3	48	Mike Ferrara^{#}	G	United States	Washington Bullets	Colgate (Sr.)
3	49	David Burns	G	United States	New Jersey Nets	Saint Louis (Sr.)
3	50	Derek Holcomb^{#}	C	United States	Portland Trail Blazers	Illinois (Sr.)
3	51	Zam Fredrick^{#}	G	United States	Los Angeles Lakers	South Carolina (Sr.)
3	52	Rudy Macklin	G/F	United States	Atlanta Hawks	LSU (Sr.)
3	53	Mark Radford	G	United States	Seattle SuperSonics	Oregon State (Sr.)
3	54	Jim Smith	F	United States	San Diego Clippers	Ohio State (Sr.)
3	55	Mickey Dillard	G	United States	Cleveland Cavaliers (from Denver)^{[x]}	Florida State (Sr.)
3	56	Carlton Neverson^{#}	G	United States	Golden State Warriors	Pittsburgh (Sr.)
3	57	Frank Brickowski	F/C	United States	New York Knicks (from Washington)^{[y]}	Penn State (Sr.)
3	58	Curtis Berry^{#}	F	United States	Kansas City Kings	Missouri (Sr.)
3	59	Russell Bowers^{#}	F	United States	Cleveland Cavaliers	American (Sr.)
3	60	Purvis Miller^{#}	F	United States	Indiana Pacers	USC (Sr.)
3	61	Pétur Guðmundsson	C	Iceland	Portland Trail Blazers	Valur (Iceland)
3	62	Sam Clancy^{#}	F	United States	Phoenix Suns	Pittsburgh (Sr.)
3	63	Wayne McKoy^{#}	F	United States	New York Knicks	St. John's (Sr.)
3	64	Tom Baker^{#}	G	United States	San Antonio Spurs	Eastern Kentucky (Sr.)
3	65	Ron Cornelius^{#}	F	United States	Los Angeles Lakers	Pacific (Sr.)
3	66	Craig Dykema	F	United States	Phoenix Suns	Long Beach State (Sr.)
3	67	Mark Smith^{#}	F	United States	Milwaukee Bucks	Illinois (Sr.)
3	68	Ernest Graham^{#}	F	United States	Philadelphia 76ers	Maryland (Sr.)
3	69	John Johnson^{#}	G	United Kingdom	Boston Celtics	Michigan (Sr.)
4	70	Eddie Moss^{#}	G	United States	Dallas Mavericks	Syracuse (Sr.)
4	71	John May^{#}	C	United States	Detroit Pistons	South Alabama (Sr.)
4	72	Ed Sherod	G	United States	New Jersey Nets	VCU (Sr.)
4	73	Georgie Torres^{#}	G	Puerto Rico	Utah Jazz	Southern Nazarene (Sr.)
4	74	Ethan Martin^{#}	G	United States	Cleveland Cavaliers	LSU (Sr.)
4	75	Kevin Figaro^{#}	G	United States	Atlanta Hawks	Southwestern Louisiana (Sr.)
4	76	Lewis Lloyd	G/F	United States	Golden State Warriors (from Seattle)^{[z]}	Drake (Sr.)
4	77	Lee Raker^{#}	G	United States	San Diego Clippers	Virginia (Sr.)
4	78	Kenny Dennard	F	United States	Kansas City Kings (from Denver)^{[aa]}	Duke (Sr.)
4	79	Ron Davis^{#}	F	United States	Washington Bullets	Arizona (Sr.)
4	80	Terry Adolph^{#}	G	United States	Golden State Warriors	West Texas State (Sr.)
4	81	Larry Spriggs	F	United States	Houston Rockets	Howard (Sr.)
4	82	B. B. Davis^{#}	F	United States	Kansas City Kings	Lamar (Sr.)
4	83	Rolando Frazer^{#}	F	Panama	Indiana Pacers	Briar Cliff (Sr.)
4	84	Oliver Lee^{#}	F	United States	Chicago Bulls	Marquette (Sr.)
4	85	Peter Verhoeven	F	United States	Portland Trail Blazers	Fresno State (Sr.)
4	86	Alex Bradley	F	United States	New York Knicks	Villanova (Sr.)
4	87	Earl Belcher^{#}	F	United States	San Antonio Spurs	St. Bonaventure (Sr.)
4	88	Kevin McKenna	G/F	United States	Los Angeles Lakers	Creighton (Sr.)
4	89	Donnie Koonce^{#}	G	United States	Detroit Pistons	Charlotte (Sr.)
4	90	Kris Anderson^{#}	F	United States	Milwaukee Bucks	Florida State (Sr.)
4	91	Stanley Williams^{#}	F	United States	Boston Celtics	La Salle (Sr.)
4	92	Rynn Wright^{#}	F	United States	Philadelphia 76ers	Texas A&M (Sr.)
5	93	Pete Budko^{#}	F	United States	Dallas Mavericks	North Carolina (Sr.)
5	94	George DeVone^{#}	C	United States	Detroit Pistons	Charlotte (Sr.)
5	95	Joe Cooper	F/C	United States	New Jersey Nets	Colorado (Sr.)
5	96	Kenny Page^{#}	G	United States	Cleveland Cavaliers	New Mexico (Jr.)
5	97	Mike Clark^{#}	F	United States	Utah Jazz	Oregon (Sr.)
5	98	Steve Krafcisin^{#}	F	United States	Atlanta Hawks	Iowa (Sr.)
5	99	Andra Griffin^{#}	F	United States	Seattle SuperSonics	Washington (Sr.)
5	100	Dennis Isbell^{#}	F	United States	San Diego Clippers	Memphis State (Sr.)
5	101	Willie Sims^{#}	G	United States (Note: Sims later became an Israeli citizen.)	Denver Nuggets	LSU (Sr.)
5	102	Hank McDowell	F/C	United States	Golden State Warriors	Memphis State (Sr.)
5	103	Garry Witts	G/F	United States	Washington Bullets	Holy Cross (Sr.)
5	104	U.S. Reed^{#}	G	United States	Kansas City Kings	Arkansas (Sr.)
5	105	Hasan Houston^{#}	G	United States	Houston Rockets	Bradley (Sr.)
5	106	George Peterson^{#}	F	United States	Indiana Pacers	Jersey City State (Sr.)
5	107	Herb Andrew^{#}	G	United States	Portland Trail Blazers	South Alabama (Sr.)
5	108	Johnny Nash^{#}	F	United States	Chicago Bulls	Arizona State (Sr.)
5	109	Jim Wright^{#}	F	United States	New York Knicks	Rhode Island (Sr.)
5	110	Mike Rhodes^{#}	G	United States	San Antonio Spurs	Vanderbilt (Sr.)
5	111	Craig Watts^{#}	C	United States	Los Angeles Lakers	NC State (Sr.)
5	112	Paul Heuerman^{#}	C	United States	Phoenix Suns	Michigan (Sr.)
5	113	Kelvin Troy^{#}	F	United States	Milwaukee Bucks	Rutgers (Sr.)
5	114	Steve Craig^{#}	G	United States	Philadelphia 76ers	BYU (Sr.)
5	115	Glen Grunwald^{#}	F	United States (Note: Grunwald obtained Canadian citizenship in 1999.)	Boston Celtics	Indiana (Sr.)
6	116	Karl Bankowski^{#}	F	United States	Dallas Mavericks	Utah (Sr.)
6	117	Vince Brookins^{#}	F	United States	Detroit Pistons	Iowa (Sr.)
6	118	Kevin Lynam^{#}	G	United States	New Jersey Nets	La Salle (Sr.)
6	119	Kevin Sprewer^{#}	C	United States	Utah Jazz	Loyola Chicago (Sr.)
6	120	Aaron Strayhorn^{#}	G	United States	Cleveland Cavaliers	Hawaii (Sr.)
6	121	Darryl Warwick^{#}	G	United States	Atlanta Hawks	Hampton (Sr.)
6	122	Earl Banks^{#}	F	United States	Seattle SuperSonics	Auburn (Sr.)
6	123	Mike Pepper^{#}	G	United States	San Diego Clippers	North Carolina (Sr.)
6	124	Alonzo Weatherly^{#}	F	United States	Denver Nuggets	Denver (Sr.)
6	125	Robert Williams^{#}	F	United States	Washington Bullets	Grambling State (Sr.)
6	126	Carter Scott^{#}	G	United States	Golden State Warriors	Ohio State (Sr.)
6	127	Fred Cowan^{#}	G	United States	Houston Rockets	Kentucky (Sr.)
6	128	Brian Walker^{#}	G	United States	Kansas City Kings	Purdue (Sr.)
6	129	Robert Fronk^{#}	G	United States	Indiana Pacers	Washington (Sr.)
6	130	Roger Burkman	G	United States	Chicago Bulls	Louisville (Sr.)
6	131	Roshern Amie^{#}	F	United States	Portland Trail Blazers	UTEP (Sr.)
6	132	John Blair^{#}	G	United States	New York Knicks	Monmouth (Sr.)
6	133	Northern Shavers^{#}	F	United States	San Antonio Spurs	Jackson State (Sr.)
6	134	Kevin Singleton^{#}	F	United States	Los Angeles Lakers	California (Sr.)
6	135	Pete Harris^{#}	G	United States	Phoenix Suns	Northeastern (Sr.)
6	136	Jo Jo Hunter^{#}	G	United States	Milwaukee Bucks	Colorado (Sr.)
6	137	Steve Waite^{#}	F	United States	Boston Celtics	Iowa (Sr.)
6	138	Michael Thomas^{#}	G	United States	Philadelphia 76ers	North Park (Sr.)
7	139	Danny Davis^{#}	F	United States	Dallas Mavericks	UNC Wilmington (Sr.)
7	140	Greg Nance^{#}	F	United States	Detroit Pistons	West Virginia (Sr.)
7	141	Rod Roberson^{#}	G	United States	New Jersey Nets	Northwestern (Sr.)
7	142	Andre Smith^{#}	F	United States	Cleveland Cavaliers	Nebraska (Sr.)
7	143	Mike Robinson^{#}	F	United States	Utah Jazz	Central Michigan (Sr.)
7	144	Kevin Vesey^{#}	C	United States	Atlanta Hawks	Iona (Sr.)
7	145	Tom Sienkiewicz^{#}	G	United States	Seattle SuperSonics	Villanova (Sr.)
7	146	Randy Johnson^{#}	G	United States	San Diego Clippers	Southern Colorado (Sr.)
7	147	Greg Manning^{#}	G	United States	Denver Nuggets	Maryland (Sr.)
7	148	Robbie Dosty^{#}	F	United States	Golden State Warriors	Arizona (Sr.)
7	149	Randy Martel^{#}	F	United States	Washington Bullets	Houston Baptist (Sr.)
7	150	Clinton Wheeler	G	United States	Kansas City Kings	William Paterson (Sr.)
7	151	Joe Faine^{#}	G	United States	Houston Rockets	Bowling Green (Sr.)
7	152	Larry McKinney^{#}	F	United States	Indiana Pacers	Boise State (Sr.)
7	153	Julius Wayne^{#}	G	United States	Portland Trail Blazers	UTEP (Sr.)
7	154	Scott Williams^{#}	G	United States	Chicago Bulls	South Alabama (Sr.)
7	155	Terry Cramer^{#}	G	United States	New York Knicks	Ripon (Sr.)
7	156	Mark Minderman^{#}	F	United States	San Antonio Spurs	Northern Michigan (Sr.)
7	157	Larry Petty^{#}	C	United States	Los Angeles Lakers	Wisconsin (Sr.)
7	158	David Williams^{#}	F	United States	Phoenix Suns	Southern (Sr.)
7	159	Lewis Latimore^{#}	C	United States	Milwaukee Bucks	Virginia (Sr.)
7	160	John Crawford^{#}	F	United States	Philadelphia 76ers	Kansas (Sr.)
7	161	Tom Seaman^{#}	F	United States	Boston Celtics	Holy Cross (Sr.)
8	162	David Kennedy^{#}	G	United States	Dallas Mavericks	Cincinnati (Sr.)
8	163	Joe Schoen^{#}	F	United States	Detroit Pistons	Saint Francis (Sr.)
8	164	Ken Webb^{#}	F	United States	New Jersey Nets	Fairleigh Dickinson (Sr.)
8	165	Bobby Cattage	F	United States	Utah Jazz	Auburn (Sr.)
8	166	Glenn Marcus^{#}	G	United States	Cleveland Cavaliers	UAB (Sr.)
8	167	Gilbert Salinas^{#}	C	United States	Atlanta Hawks	Notre Dame (Sr.)
8	168	Todd Haynes^{#}	F	United States	San Diego Clippers	Davidson (Sr.)
8	169	Curtis Redding^{#}	G	United States	Denver Nuggets	St. John's (Sr.)
8	170	Mike Howard^{#}	G	United States	Washington Bullets	Wofford (Sr.)
8	171	Yasutaka Okayama^{#}	C	Japan	Golden State Warriors	Sumitomo Metal Sparks (Japan)
8	172	Stanley Brewer^{#}	G	United States	Houston Rockets	West Georgia (Sr.)
8	173	Randy Smithson^{#}	G	United States	Kansas City Kings	Wichita State (Sr.)
8	174	Len Hatzenbeller^{#}	C	United States	Indiana Pacers	Drexel (Sr.)
8	175	Ben Mitchell^{#}	F	United States	Chicago Bulls	Alabama–Huntsville (Sr.)
8	176	John Smith^{#}	F	United States	Portland Trail Blazers	Saint Joseph's (Sr.)
8	177	Brian O'Connor^{#}	F	United States	New York Knicks	Thomas More (Sr.)
8	178	Bob Bartholomew^{#}	F	United States	San Antonio Spurs	San Diego (Sr.)
8	179	Jay Triano^{#}	G	Canada	Los Angeles Lakers	Simon Fraser (Sr.)
8	180	Steve Risley^{#}	F	United States	Phoenix Suns	Indiana (Sr.)
8	181	Mike Brkovich^{#}	G	Canada	Milwaukee Bucks	Michigan State (Sr.)
8	182	George Morrow^{#}	F	United States	Boston Celtics	Creighton (Sr.)
8	183	Frank Gilroy^{#}	F	United States	Philadelphia 76ers	St. John's (Sr.)
9	184	John Hollinden^{#}	C	United States	Dallas Mavericks	Southern Indiana (Sr.)
9	185	Eddie Baker^{#}	F	United States	Detroit Pistons	Alcorn State (Sr.)
9	186	Rudy Williams^{#}	F	United States	New Jersey Nets	Providence (Sr.)
9	187	Paul Roba^{#}	C	United States	Cleveland Cavaliers	Cleveland State (Sr.)
9	188	Ken Ollie^{#}	F	United States	Utah Jazz	Wyoming (Sr.)
9	189	Howard Thompkins^{#}	F	United States	Atlanta Hawks	Wagner (Sr.)
9	190	Art Jones^{#}	F	United States	San Diego Clippers	NC State (Sr.)
9	191	Andrew Burton^{#}	G	United States	Denver Nuggets	Austin Peay (Sr.)
9	192	Doug Murrey^{#}	F	United States	Golden State Warriors	San Jose State (Sr.)
9	193	Eddie Brown^{#}	G	United States	Washington Bullets	Valdosta State (Sr.)
9	194	Michael Perry^{#}	G	United States	Kansas City Kings	Richmond (Sr.)
9	195	Scott Whitley^{#}	F	United States	Indiana Pacers	William & Mary (Sr.)
9	196	Sid Williams^{#}	F	United States	Portland Trail Blazers	San Jose State (Sr.)
9	197	Terry Martin^{#}	G	United States	Chicago Bulls	Lambuth (Sr.)
9	198	Marty Headd^{#}	G	United States	New York Knicks	Syracuse (Sr.)
9	199	Leonel Marquetti^{#}	F	Cuba (Note: Marquetti was born in Cuba and raised in the United States where he held dual citizenship.)	San Antonio Spurs	Hampton (Jr.)
9	200	Brian Johnson^{#}	F	United States	Phoenix Suns	Colorado (Sr.)
9	201	Chip Rucker^{#}	F	United States	Milwaukee Bucks	Northeastern (Sr.)
9	202	Ron Wister^{#}	C	United States	Philadelphia 76ers	Temple (Sr.)
9	203	Greg McCray^{#}	F	United States	Boston Celtics	VCU (Sr.)
10	204	Scott Bolanko^{#}	G	United States	Dallas Mavericks	Northern State (Sr.)
10	205	Melvin Maxwell^{#}	F	United States	Detroit Pistons	Western Michigan (Sr.)
10	206	Vic Sison^{#}	G	United States	New Jersey Nets	UCLA (Sr.)
10	207	Joe Merten^{#}	F	United States	Utah Jazz	Wisconsin–Eau Claire (Sr.)
10	208	Greg Boone^{#}	G	United States	Cleveland Cavaliers	Augsburg (Sr.)
10	209	Mike Frazier^{#}	C	United States	Atlanta Hawks	Georgetown (Sr.)
10	210	Tony Gwynn^{#}	G	United States	San Diego Clippers	San Diego State (Sr.)
10	211	Derrick Rowland	G	United States	Denver Nuggets	Potsdam State (Sr.)
10	212	Ralton Way^{#}	F	United Kingdom (Note: Way was born in the United Kingdom and raised in the United States. A dual national, he played for the British national team.)	Washington Bullets	Houston Baptist (Sr.)
10	213	Barry Brooks^{#}	F	United States	Golden State Warriors	USC (Sr.)
10	214	Mark Wilson^{#}	G	United States	Kansas City Kings	Fort Hays State (Sr.)
10	215	Rodney Benson^{#}	F	United States	Indiana Pacers	Wright State (Sr.)
10	216	Kenny Easley^{#}	G	United States	Chicago Bulls	UCLA (Sr.)
10	217	Steve Cochran^{#}	G	United States	Portland Trail Blazers	Lewis & Clark (Sr.)
10	218	Kevin Rogers^{#}	C	United States	New York Knicks	Saint Peter's (Sr.)
10	219	Alvin Brooks^{#}	G	United States	San Antonio Spurs	Lamar (Sr.)
10	220	Felton Sealey^{#}	G	United States	Phoenix Suns	Oregon (Sr.)
10	221	Artie Green^{#}	G	United States	Milwaukee Bucks	Marquette (Sr.)
10	222	Kenny Matthews^{#}	G	United States	Boston Celtics	NC State (Sr.)
10	223	Pete Mullenberg^{#}	C	United States	Philadelphia 76ers	Delaware (Sr.)

== Notable undrafted players ==
These players were not selected in the 1981 draft but played at least one game in the NBA.

Player	Pos.	Nationality	School/club team
Ron Cavenall	C	United States	Texas Southern (Sr.)
Jerome Henderson	C/F	United States	New Mexico (Sr.)

== Trades ==
=== Draft-day trades ===
The following trades involving drafted players were made on the day of the draft.

- ^{A 1} ^{2} The Indiana Pacers acquired the draft rights to 32nd pick Mike Olliver from the Chicago Bulls in exchange for the draft rights to 36th pick Ray Blume and a 1982 second-round pick.

=== Pre-draft trades ===
Prior to the day of the draft, the following trades were made and resulted in exchanges of picks between the teams.

- ^{a 1} ^{2} ^{3} ^{4} On June 8, 1981, the Atlanta Hawks acquired a 1981 first-round pick and a 1981 second-round pick from the Chicago Bulls in exchange for a 1981 first-round pick, a 1982 second-round pick and an option to swap 1982 first-round draft picks. Previously, the Bulls acquired the draft rights to Ronnie Lester and the first-round pick on June 10, 1980, from the Portland Trail Blazers in exchange for the draft rights to Kelvin Ransey and a 1981 first-round pick. Previously, the Blazers acquired the pick on February 8, 1980, from the Philadelphia 76ers in exchange for Lionel Hollins. Previously, the 76ers acquired the pick and a 1983 first-round pick on October 3, 1977, from the Cleveland Cavaliers in exchange for Terry Furlow. The Hawks used the picks to draft Al Wood and Clyde Bradshaw. The Bulls used the pick to draft Orlando Woolridge. The Blazers used the pick to draft Darnell Valentine.
- ^{b} On January 4, 1978, the Seattle SuperSonics acquired a first-round pick from the Utah Jazz in exchange for Slick Watts. The Sonics used the pick to draft Danny Vranes.
- ^{c} September 25, 1980, the Kansas City Kings acquired Joe Meriweather and a first-round pick from the New York Knicks in a three-team trade with the Knicks and the Cleveland Cavaliers. Previously, the Knicks acquired a first-round pick on October 4, 1978, from the Seattle SuperSonics in exchange for Lonnie Shelton and a 1979 first-round pick. This trade was arranged as compensation when the Knicks signed Marvin Webster on September 29, 1978. The Kings used the pick to draft Steve Johnson.
- ^{d} On December 3, 1980, the Dallas Mavericks acquired 1981 and 1985 first-round picks from the Denver Nuggets in exchange for Kiki Vandeweghe and a 1986 first-round pick. The Mavericks used the pick to draft Rolando Blackman.
- ^{e} On February 8, 1980, the New Jersey Nets acquired Maurice Lucas, 1980 and 1981 first-round picks from the Portland Trail Blazers in exchange for Calvin Natt. Previously, the Blazers acquired the pick on June 7, 1978, from the Golden State Warriors in exchange for a 1978 first-round pick. The Nets used the pick to draft Albert King.
- ^{f} On June 12, 1980, the Detroit Pistons acquired a first-round pick from the Kansas City Kings as compensation for the signing of Leon Douglas as a free agent. The Pistons used the pick to draft Kelly Tripucka.
- ^{g} On September 21, 1978, the Utah Jazz acquired a first-round pick from the Houston Rockets in exchange for Slick Watts. The Jazz used the pick to draft Danny Schayes.
- ^{h 1} ^{2} On June 8, 1981, the Indiana Pacers acquired 1981 and 1982 second-round picks on June 8, 1981, from the Cleveland Cavaliers. This trade was arranged as compensation when the Cavaliers signed James Edwards on May 25, 1981. Previously, the Kansas City Kings acquired a first-round pick on June 8, 1981, from the Cavaliers in exchange for the second-round pick. This trade was arranged as compensation when the Cavaliers signed Scott Wedman. Previously, the Cavaliers acquired the first-round pick on May 20, 1981, from the New York Knicks in exchange for Randy Smith. The Kings used the pick to draft Kevin Loder. The Pacers used the pick to draft Ray Blume.
- ^{i} On August 15, 1980, the New Jersey Nets acquired a first-round pick from the San Antonio Spurs as compensation for the signing of George Johnson as a free agent. The Nets used the pick to draft Ray Tolbert.
- ^{j} On October 19, 1978, the Boston Celtics acquired Chris Ford and a second-round pick from the Detroit Pistons in exchange for Earl Tatum. The Celtics used the pick to draft Tracy Jackson.
- ^{k} On October 9, 1979, the Portland Trail Blazers acquired a second-round pick from the Indiana Pacers in exchange for Clemon Johnson. Previously, the Pacers acquired Bob Carrington, 1980 and 1981 second-round picks on January 27, 1978, from the New Jersey Nets in exchange for John Williamson. The Blazers used the pick to draft Brian Jackson.
- ^{l 1} ^{2} On September 12, 1980, the San Antonio Spurs acquired two second-round picks from the Chicago Bulls as compensation for the signing of Larry Kenon as a free agent. Previously, the Bulls acquired one of the pick on August 8, 1980, from the Seattle SuperSonics as compensation for the signing of Dennis Awtrey as a free agent. Previously, the Bulls acquired Oliver Mack, 1980 and 1981 second-round picks on February 13, 1980, from the Los Angeles Lakers in exchange for Mark Landsberger. Previously, the Lakers acquired 1980 and 1981 second-round picks on October 24, 1979, from the Cleveland Cavaliers in exchange for Kenny Carr. The Spurs used the picks to draft Gene Banks and Ed Rains.
- ^{m} On July 8, 1980, the Kansas City Kings acquired a second-round pick from the Atlanta Hawks as compensation for the signing of Tommy Burleson as a free agent. Previously, the Hawks acquired a 1980 second-round pick and re-acquired their second-round pick on November 23, 1979, from the Utah Jazz in exchange for Terry Furlow. Previously, the Jazz acquired the pick and a 1980 second-round pick on October 10, 1979, from the Hawks in exchange for Ron Lee. The Kings used the pick to draft Eddie Johnson.
- ^{n} On August 4, 1978, the Boston Celtics acquired Nate Archibald, Marvin Barnes, Billy Knight, 1981 and 1983 second-round picks from the San Diego Clippers in exchange for Kevin Kunnert, Kermit Washington, Sidney Wicks and Freeman Williams. The Celtics used the pick to draft Danny Ainge.
- ^{o} On June 9, 1980, the Chicago Bulls acquired a second-round pick from the Denver Nuggets in exchange for Cedrick Hordges. The Bulls used the pick to draft Mike Olliver.
- ^{p} On June 10, 1980, the Golden State Warriors acquired a second-round pick from the Washington Bullets in exchange for the draft rights to Jeff Ruland. The Warriors used the pick to draft Sam Williams.
- ^{q} On September 11, 1980, the Denver Nuggets acquired Wayne Cooper and a second-round pick from the Utah Jazz in exchange for Bernard King. Previously, the Jazz acquired the pick and a 1980 third-round pick on October 9, 1979, from the Golden State Warriors in exchange for Robert Smith. The Nuggets used the pick to draft Ken Green.
- ^{r} On June 8, 1981, the Washington Bullets acquired 1981 and 1983 second-round picks from the Houston Rockets in exchange for Elvin Hayes. The Bullets used the pick to draft Charles Davis.
- ^{s} On October 1, 1980, the Los Angeles Lakers acquired a second-round pick from the Detroit Pistons in exchange for Wayne Robinson. Previously, the Pistons acquired a second-round pick on September 18, 1979, from the Portland Trail Blazers in exchange for Jim Brewer. The Lakers used the pick to draft Harvey Knuckles.
- ^{t} On September 26, 1980, the Washington Bullets acquired 1981 and 1982 second-round picks from the San Antonio Spurs in exchange for Dave Corzine. The Bullets used the pick to draft Claude Gregory.
- ^{u} On June 9, 1980, the Dallas Mavericks acquired a second-round pick from the Phoenix Suns in exchange for Wiley Peck. The Mavericks used the pick to draft Elston Turner.
- ^{v} On February 4, 1980, the Washington Bullets acquired John Williamson and a second-round pick from the New Jersey Nets in exchange for Roger Phegley. Previously, the Nets acquired Otis Birdsong and the pick on June 8, 1981, from the Kansas City Kings in exchange for Cliff Robinson. Previously, the Kings acquired the pick on June 19, 1980, from the Milwaukee Bucks as compensation for the signing of Len Elmore as a free agent. The Bullets used the pick to draft Steve Lingenfelter.
- ^{w} On June 28, 1978, the Houston Rockets acquired a second-round pick from the Boston Celtics as compensation for the signing of Kevin Kunnert as a free agent. The Rockets used the pick to draft Ed Turner.
- ^{x} On October 31, 1980, the Cleveland Cavaliers acquired Kim Hughes, a 1981 third-round pick and a 1982 second-round pick from the Denver Nuggets in exchange for Dave Robisch. The Cavaliers used the pick to draft Mickey Dillard.
- ^{y} On December 4, 1979, the New York Knicks acquired a third-round pick from the Washington Bullets in exchange for Jim Cleamons. The Knicks used the pick to draft Frank Brickowski.
- ^{z} On November 3, 1980, the Golden State Warriors acquired a fourth-round pick from the Seattle SuperSonics in exchange for Rudy White. The Warriors used the pick to draft Lewis Lloyd.
- ^{aa} On July 10, 1978, the Kansas City Kings acquired a fourth-round pick from the Denver Nuggets in exchange for Geoff Crompton. The Kings used the pick to draft Kenny Dennard.

== Draftee career notes ==
Isiah Thomas is the only player from this draft who has been inducted to the Basketball Hall of Fame. He was also named in the 50 Greatest Players in NBA History list announced at the league's 50th anniversary in 1996. He spent his entire 13-year career with the Detroit Pistons and won two NBA championships. He also one Finals Most Valuable Player Award, five consecutive All-NBA Team selections and twelve consecutive All-Star Game selections. After retiring as a player, Thomas went on to have a coaching career with the Indiana Pacers and the New York Knicks. Mark Aguirre, the first pick, won two NBA championships with Thomas and the Pistons. His other achievements include three All-Star Game selections. Buck Williams, the third pick, was selected to one All-NBA Team, three All-Star Games and four All-Defensive Teams. Tom Chambers, the eighth pick, was selected to two All-NBA Teams and four All-Star Games. Five other players from this draft, seventh pick Steve Johnson, ninth pick Rolando Blackman, 12th pick Kelly Tripucka, 20th pick Larry Nance and 31st pick Danny Ainge, were also selected to at least one All-Star Game each. Eddie Johnson, the 29th pick, is the only other player from this draft who has won an annual NBA award as a player; he won the Sixth Man of the Year Award in 1989. Aside from Thomas, four other players drafted also went on to have coaching careers in the NBA: Danny Ainge, 11th pick Frank Johnson, 14th pick Herb Williams and 179th pick Jay Triano.

In the eighth round, the Golden State Warriors used the 171st pick to selected Yasutaka Okayama, a Japanese basketball player who was measured at 7 feet 8 inches (2.34 m) and 330 pounds (150 kg). Okayama, who attended and played junior varsity basketball at the University of Portland for one and a half years in 1976 as an exchange student, declined to try out for the Warriors and never played in the NBA. He is the tallest person ever drafted and would have been the tallest player in the NBA had he played in the league. The San Diego Clippers used their last pick in the draft, the 210th pick, to draft Tony Gwynn, who starred at both baseball and basketball at San Diego State University. Gwynn was also selected in the 1981 MLB draft by the San Diego Padres. He opted to play baseball and ended up playing 20 seasons with the Padres. He received multiple awards and honors during his playing career, is one of only 28 players in MLB history with 3,000 career hits, and was inducted to the Baseball Hall of Fame at his first opportunity in 2007. Kenny Easley, a college football star from the University of California, Los Angeles, was selected by the Chicago Bulls with the 216th pick in the 10th round. Easley, who was selected fourth in the 1981 National Football League (NFL) draft by the Seattle Seahawks, played seven seasons with the Seahawks and received several awards and honors before retiring in 1988 due to kidney problems that eventually led to a transplant.

== Early entrants ==
=== College underclassmen ===
For the fourth year in a row, no college underclassman would withdraw their entry into the NBA draft. Just like the first time this happened, though, only five total players would officially enter this year's draft under that moniker. Leonel Marquetti would become the first official foreign-born college underclassman to qualify for this rule (in his case, being born Cuban while raised as an American), as previous years only had American-born players that fit the criteria at the time. The following college basketball players successfully applied for early draft entrance.

- (United States) Mark Aguirre – F, DePaul (junior)
- (Cuba) / (United States) Leonel Marquetti – F, Hampton (junior)
- (United States) Kenny Page – G, New Mexico (junior)
- (United States) Isiah Thomas – G, Indiana (sophomore)
- (United States) Buck Williams – F, Maryland (junior)

== Invited attendees ==
The 1981 NBA draft is considered to be the fourth NBA draft to have utilized what's properly considered the "green room" experience for NBA prospects. The NBA's green room is a staging area where anticipated draftees often sit with their families and representatives, waiting for their names to be called on draft night. Often being positioned either in front of or to the side of the podium (in this case, being positioned in the Grand Hyatt Hotel's Grand Ballroom), once a player heard his name, he would walk to the podium to shake hands and take promotional photos with the NBA commissioner. From there, the players often conducted interviews with various media outlets while backstage. However, once the NBA draft started to air nationally on TV starting with the 1980 NBA draft, the green room evolved from players waiting to hear their name called and then shaking hands with these select players who were often called to the hotel to take promotional pictures with the NBA commissioner a day or two after the draft concluded to having players in real-time waiting to hear their names called up and then shaking hands with Larry O'Brien, the NBA's commissioner. The NBA compiled its list of green room invites through collective voting by the NBA's team presidents and general managers alike, which in this year's case belonged to only what they believed were the top 13 prospects at the time. As such, the following players were invited to attend this year's draft festivities live and in person.

- (United States) Mark Aguirre – SG/SF, DePaul
- (United States) / (Panama) Rolando Blackman – SG, Kansas State
- (United States) Tom Chambers – PF/C, Utah
- (United States) Steve Johnson – PF/C, Oregon State
- (United States) Albert King – SG/SF, Maryland
- (United States) Danny Schayes – C, Syracuse
- (United States) Isiah Thomas – PG, Indiana
- (United States) Kelly Tripucka – SG/SF, Notre Dame
- (United States) Danny Vranes – PF, Utah
- (United States) Buck Williams – PF/C, Maryland
- (United States) Herb Williams – PF/C, Ohio State
- (United States) Al Wood – SG/SF, North Carolina
- (United States) Orlando Woolridge – SF, Notre Dame

== See also ==
- List of first overall NBA draft picks
