= Kevin Loder =

American basketball player

Personal information
- Born: March 15, 1959 (age 67) Cassopolis, Michigan, U.S.
- Listed height: 6 ft 6 in (1.98 m)
- Listed weight: 205 lb (93 kg)

Career information
- High school: Ross Beatty (Cassopolis, Michigan)
- College: Kentucky State (1977–1978); Alabama State (1978–1981)
- NBA draft: 1981: 1st round, 17th overall pick
- Drafted by: Kansas City Kings
- Playing career: 1981–1984
- Position: Small forward
- Number: 30, 9

Career history
- 1981–1983: Kansas City Kings
- 1983: San Diego Clippers
- 1983–1984: Sarasota Stingers
- Stats at NBA.com
- Stats at Basketball Reference

Kevin Allen Loder (born March 15, 1959) is an American former professional basketball player who was selected by the Kansas City Kings in the first round (17th pick overall) of the 1981 NBA draft. A 6-foot-6-inch (1.98 m) swingman born in Cassopolis, Michigan, Loder played in three NBA seasons from 1981 to 1984. He played for the Kings and San Diego Clippers.

In his NBA career, Loder played in 148 games and scored a total of 875 points. His best year as a professional came during his rookie year for the Kings, appearing in 71 games and averaging 6.9 points per game.

On July 18, 2018, the Kansas City Tornadoes hired Kevin Loder as the chief operating officer.

== Career statistics ==
Legend
GP	Games played	GS	Games started	MPG	Minutes per game
FG%	Field goal percentage	3P%	3-point field goal percentage	FT%	Free throw percentage
RPG	Rebounds per game	APG	Assists per game	SPG	Steals per game
BPG	Blocks per game	PPG	Points per game	**Bold**	Career high

=== NBA ===
==== Regular season ====
Year	Team	GP	GS	MPG	FG%	3P%	FT%	RPG	APG	SPG	BPG	PPG
1981–82	Kansas City	**71**	**13**	**16.0**	**.464**	.000	**.720**	**2.7**	1.2	**.5**	.4	**6.9**
1982–83	Kansas City	66	**13**	12.4	.460	**.556**	.663	1.9	1.1	.4	.1	5.1
1983–84	Kansas City	10	0	13.3	.442	.333	.692	1.8	1.4	.3	**.5**	4.8
1983–84	San Diego	1	0	4.0	–	–	–	.0	.0	.0	.0	.0
Career		148	26	14.1	.461	.261	.695	2.3	1.2	.5	.3	5.9
