= Mike Dunleavy Sr. =

American basketball player, coach, executive

Mike Dunleavy
Personal information
- Born: March 21, 1954 (age 72) Brooklyn, New York, U.S.
- Listed height: 6 ft 3 in (1.91 m)
- Listed weight: 180 lb (82 kg)

Career information
- High school: Nazareth Regional (Brooklyn, New York)
- College: South Carolina (1972–1976)
- NBA draft: 1976: 6th round, 99th overall pick
- Drafted by: Philadelphia 76ers
- Playing career: 1976–1985, 1988–1990
- Position: Point guard / shooting guard
- Number: 10, 31
- Coaching career: 1988–2019

Career history

Playing
- 1976–1977: Philadelphia 76ers
- 1978: Carolina Lightning
- 1978–1982: Houston Rockets
- 1982–1983: San Antonio Spurs
- 1984–1985 1988–1990: Milwaukee Bucks

Career highlights
- McDonald's Open champion (1991); NBA Coach of the Year (1999)

Career NBA statistics
- Points: 3,496 (8.0 ppg)
- Rebounds: 689 (1.6 rpg)
- Assists: 1,723 (3.9 apg)
- Stats at NBA.com
- Stats at Basketball Reference

Michael Joseph Dunleavy Sr. (born March 21, 1954) is an American former professional basketball player, coach, and former general manager of the National Basketball Association's Los Angeles Clippers. He was most recently the head coach of the Tulane University men's basketball team. Dunleavy is the father of former professional basketball player Mike Dunleavy Jr.

== Early life ==
Dunleavy was born in Brooklyn, New York. His primary education was at Holy Cross. He attended Nazareth Regional High School in Brooklyn, then graduated from the University of South Carolina, where he played under coach Frank McGuire.

== Playing career ==
Drafted in the sixth round of the 1976 NBA draft with the 99th overall pick by the Philadelphia 76ers, the 6'3" guard played for them for one full season along with Hall-of-Fame teammate Julius Erving and made the Finals in a losing effort against the Portland Trail Blazers. Dunleavy then split the following season between Philadelphia and the Houston Rockets after being traded mid-season. Houston made the finals, and this time Dunleavy played a large role for his team in the series, including scoring a game-high 28 points to help lead the Rockets to a Game 4 win, but yet again his team lost, this time to the Boston Celtics.

Dunleavy remained in Texas after leaving Houston for the 1982–83 season, because he spent that season with the neighboring San Antonio Spurs. After two following seasons with the Milwaukee Bucks he retired due to chronic back pain. His best season as a player was with Houston in 1980–81, when he averaged 10.5 points per game and started on a team that played in the NBA Finals.

During his retirement, Dunleavy worked in an investment firm. In 1987, he joined the Milwaukee Bucks as an assistant coach. In 1988–89 and 1989–90, while an assistant coach with the Bucks, he helped as a player for two and five games respectively. In 438 games he averaged 8 points, 1.6 rebounds and 3.9 assists.

== NBA career statistics ==
Legend
GP	Games played	GS	Games started	MPG	Minutes per game
FG%	Field goal percentage	3P%	3-point field goal percentage	FT%	Free throw percentage
RPG	Rebounds per game	APG	Assists per game	SPG	Steals per game
BPG	Blocks per game	PPG	Points per game	**Bold**	Career high
*	Led the league

=== Regular season ===
Year	Team	GP	GS	MPG	FG%	3P%	FT%	RPG	APG	SPG	BPG	PPG
1976–77	Philadelphia	32	-	11.2	.414	-	.756	1.1	1.8	0.4	0.1	4.8
1977–78	Philadelphia	4	-	4.3	.429	-	**1.000**	0.3	1.5	0.3	0.0	2.0
1977–78	Houston	11	-	9.3	.395	-	.688	0.8	2.0	0.7	0.1	4.1
1978–79	Houston	74	-	20.1	.506	-	.864	1.7	4.4	0.8	0.1	8.0
1979–80	Houston	51	-	20.3	.464	.150	.828	**2.0**	4.1	0.8	0.1	8.0
1980–81	Houston	74	-	21.7	.491	.063	.839	1.6	3.6	**0.9**	0.0	10.5
1981–82	Houston	70	15	18.8	.458	.384	.708	1.5	3.2	0.6	0.0	7.4
1982–83	San Antonio	**79**	9	20.5	.418	.345*	.779	1.7	**5.5**	**0.9**	0.1	7.8
1983–84	Milwaukee	17	12	**23.8**	**.551**	.422	.800	1.6	4.6	0.7	0.1	**11.2**
1984–85	Milwaukee	19	**19**	22.8	.474	.340	.862	1.6	4.5	0.8	**0.2**	8.9
1988–89	Milwaukee	2	0	2.5	.500	**.500**	.000	0.0	0.0	0.0	0.0	1.5
1989–90	Milwaukee	5	0	8.6	.286	.222	.875	0.4	2.0	0.2	0.0	3.4
Career		438	55	19.2	.467	.339	.810	1.6	3.9	0.8	0.1	8.0

=== Playoffs ===
Year	Team	GP	GS	MPG	FG%	3P%	FT%	RPG	APG	SPG	BPG	PPG
1976–77	Philadelphia	11	-	6.2	.360	-	.800	0.4	0.8	0.3	0.0	2.0
1978–79	Houston	1	-	10.0	.000	-	.000	1.0	0.0	0.0	0.0	0.0
1979–80	Houston	6	-	7.5	**.500**	.000	.833	0.8	2.2	0.8	0.0	2.8
1980–81	Houston	**20**	-	23.6	.454	**.400**	.868	2.1	3.4	0.8	**0.1**	8.9
1981–82	Houston	3	-	22.0	.409	.000	.833	1.0	3.0	0.7	0.0	7.7
1982–83	San Antonio	11	-	15.8	.338	.267	.692	1.2	**4.5**	0.8	**0.1**	5.5
1983–84	Milwaukee	15	-	**26.2**	.457	.360	**.917**	**2.3**	3.1	**1.1**	0.0	**11.3**
Career		67	-	18.3	.428	.317	.856	1.5	2.9	0.8	0.0	7.0

== Coaching career ==
Dunleavy entered his first head coaching job in 1990 as coach of the Los Angeles Lakers, replacing Pat Riley. In 1991 his team, led by Magic Johnson and Vlade Divac, beat the Portland Trail Blazers in the Western Conference Finals and he led his team to the NBA Finals against the Chicago Bulls but they lost in five games. In his second season, he led the Lakers to the win in the McDonald's Open in Paris, France in October. Shortly after the tournament, Johnson was diagnosed with HIV and retired. Without him, the Lakers made the playoffs again but lost in the first round. Dunleavy then joined the Milwaukee Bucks as head coach prior to the 1992–93 season and remained with them until the end of the 1995–96 season, in a dual role as vice-president of basketball operations and head coach. He relinquished his head coaching duties after a mediocre tenure to operate as the general manager, until accepting the job of head coach of the Portland Trail Blazers in 1997.

Dunleavy was named NBA Coach of the Year in 1999 while with the Blazers. He remained in Portland until the end of the 2000–01 season, when he was fired. He made the playoffs four times with the team.

He joined the Clippers in 2003. Dunleavy led the Clippers to the second round of the playoffs, their first playoff berth since 1997, and to the franchise's first series win since a 1977 first-round victory while the team was still playing in Buffalo. The Clippers finished 40–42 in 2006–07, out of the playoffs after a season-ending slump brought on by injury. He also worked for TNT in 2008, calling NBA playoff games.

On February 4, 2010, Dunleavy stepped down from his duties as the Clippers' coach. He retained his position as general manager, with Kim Hughes, who had worked as Dunleavy's assistant for seven seasons, becoming interim head coach for the remainder of the 2009–10 season. On March 9, 2010, the Clippers fired Dunleavy as general manager. The Clippers accused Dunleavy of defrauding the team, and he sued the club for money owed on the remainder of his contract. An arbitrator ordered the Clippers pay Dunleavy $13 million in 2011.

On March 28, 2016, Tulane University announced Dunleavy as the coach of the men's basketball team. This marked Dunleavy's first job as a college coach. On March 16, 2019, Tulane announced Dunleavy would not return for the 2019–20 season after finishing 4–27 in his final season.

== Personal life ==
Dunleavy has three sons: Mike Jr., who starred at Duke University and played for six NBA teams from 2002 to 2017; Baker, the former head coach at Quinnipiac University; and James, an NBA player agent.

== Head coaching record ==
=== NBA ===
Legend
Regular season	G	Games coached	W	Games won	L	Games lost	W–L %	Win–loss %
Playoffs	PG	Playoff games	PW	Playoff wins	PL	Playoff losses	PW–L %	Playoff win–loss %

Team	Year	G	W	L	W–L%	Finish	PG	PW	PL	PW–L%	Result
L.A. Lakers	1990–91	82	58	24	.707	2nd in Pacific	19	12	7	.632	Lost in NBA Finals
L.A. Lakers	1991–92	82	43	39	.524	6th in Pacific	4	1	3	.250	Lost in First round
Milwaukee	1992–93	82	28	54	.321	7th in Central	—	—	—	—	Missed Playoffs
Milwaukee	1993–94	82	20	62	.244	6th in Central	—	—	—	—	Missed Playoffs
Milwaukee	1994–95	82	34	48	.415	6th in Central	—	—	—	—	Missed Playoffs
Milwaukee	1995–96	82	25	57	.305	7th in Central	—	—	—	—	Missed Playoffs
Portland	1997–98	82	46	36	.561	4th in Pacific	4	1	3	.250	Lost in First round
Portland	1998–99	50	35	15	.700	1st in Pacific	13	7	6	.538	Lost in Conf. Finals
Portland	1999–00	82	59	23	.720	2nd in Pacific	16	10	6	.625	Lost in Conf. Finals
Portland	2000–01	82	50	32	.610	4th in Pacific	3	0	3	.000	Lost in First round
L.A. Clippers	2003–04	82	28	54	.341	7th in Pacific	—	—	—	—	Missed Playoffs
L.A. Clippers	2004–05	82	37	45	.451	3rd in Pacific	—	—	—	—	Missed Playoffs
L.A. Clippers	2005–06	82	47	35	.573	2nd in Pacific	12	7	5	.583	Lost in Conf. Semifinals
L.A. Clippers	2006–07	82	40	42	.488	4th in Pacific	—	—	—	—	Missed Playoffs
L.A. Clippers	2007–08	82	23	59	.280	5th in Pacific	—	—	—	—	Missed Playoffs
L.A. Clippers	2008–09	82	19	63	.231	4th in Pacific	—	—	—	—	Missed Playoffs
L.A. Clippers	2009–10	49	21	28	.429	(resigned)	—	—	—	—	—
Career		1329	613	716	.461		71	38	33	.535	

=== College ===
Record table
Season	Team	Overall	Conference	Standing	Postseason
Tulane Green Wave (American Athletic Conference) (2016–2019)
2016–17	Tulane	6–25	3–15	10th	
2017–18	Tulane	14–17	5–13	10th	
2018–19	Tulane	4–27	0–18	12th	
Tulane:		24–69 (.258)	8–46 (.148)		
Total:		24–69 (.258)			
