= Verbum Dei Jesuit High School =

Location
- 11100 South Central Avenue; Los Angeles, California 90059; United States; 33°56′5″N 118°15′12″W

Information
- Type: Private, Jesuit, Catholic, Cristo Rey, College Prep
- Religious affiliation: Roman Catholic
- Established: 1962; 64 years ago
- Founder: Society of the Divine Word
- Oversight: Society of Jesus
- President: Travis Russell, SJ
- Principal: Jesse Rodriguez (as of June 2023)
- Grades: 9–12
- Enrollment: 325
- Average class size: 17
- Student to teacher ratio: 13:1
- Colors: Blue and Gold
- Slogan: Work Hard. Play Hard. Pray Hard.
- Athletics conference: CIF Southern Section; Santa Fe League
- Sports: List: Basketball; Football; Soccer; Cross Country; Track and Field
- Mascot: Eagle
- Nickname: The Verb
- Accreditation: Western Association of Schools and Colleges
- Newspaper: Present Dei
- Tuition: $2,700
- Affiliation: Cristo Rey Network
- Website: www.verbjesuit.org

Verbum Dei Jesuit High School, nicknamed the Verb, is a private Catholic all-boys college preparatory school sponsored by the Society of Jesus in Los Angeles, California. It was founded in 1962 by the Society of the Divine Word to serve students from the Watts neighborhood and the surrounding communities who are economically and academically under-served.

Verbum Dei is known for sending its graduates to some of the more selective colleges in the United States and has held a 100% success rate for sending graduating seniors to college.

== History ==
Verbum Dei was founded in 1962 by the Divine Word Missionaries with the permission and recommendation of Cardinal James McIntyre to serve the educational needs of the black community of South Los Angeles. The school was named after one of Jesus' epithets, Verbum Dei ("the Word of God"). Bishop Joseph Francis, S.V.D., led the founding team and was the school's first principal. The Society maintained a presence at the school until December 2006, when the long-time Verbum Dei faculty/staff member Br. Richard "Rich" Morrill, S.V.D., left because of terminal illness.

At some point, the school expanded its mission in order to also serve the educational needs of the Latino community of South Los Angeles.

Verbum Dei's performance began to decline in the 1980s and suffered further during the neighborhood gang wars of the 1990s; it experienced declining enrollment and instability within the administration. However, it received significant financial help in the mid-1990s and improvements were made in various buildings on campus and new buildings were added.

In 2000, Cardinal Roger Mahony asked the California Province of the Society of Jesus to assist in the administration of the school, asserting that the school had to improve significantly by 2006 to avoid permanent shutdown. Verbum Dei became recognized as a Jesuit school at that point. Leading the Jesuit team was Fr Bill Wood. The school became a member of the Cristo Rey Network and adopted its current scholastic model (see Corporate Work Study Program below) in 2002.

On July 1, 2022, the school changed its name to Verbum Dei Jesuit High School to reflect fully transitioning to a school solely sponsored by the Jesuits. The Religious of the Sacred Heart of Mary have also been providing a sister to the Verbum Dei staff.

== Accreditation ==
The school has joint accreditation by the Western Association of Schools and Colleges (WASC) and the Western Catholic Educational Association (WCEA). Verbum Dei also has accreditation by the USA West Province of the Society of Jesus.

== Corporate Work Study Program ==
Like other members of the Cristo Rey Network, Verbum Dei assigns students to jobs that are "donated" by local white-collar companies and non-profit entities in the Los Angeles metropolitan area. This experience is intended to acclimate students to corporate culture, build their character and provide a motive for seeking higher education and productive careers.

The money earned by the students defrays the cost of the students' education. Participating organizations give one "full-time equivalent" student internship for a fee of $28,000. The position is filled by carefully selected young men from low-income families with an average work attendance of 99 percent. Each student works five full days a month on a rotational basis, and they attend classes and participate in extracurricular activities the remaining days. Ninety-seven percent of the student interns receive a performance evaluation of good or excellent. While almost all students benefit from various internship experiences, 37 percent of seniors have remained at the company they were placed with in their freshman year.

Verbum Dei provides transportation, insurance, workers' compensation, and work permits for its student interns. The CWSP staff has a program coordinator to co-manage the students.

== Activities ==
Verbum Dei High School's teams have won national championships in various sports, including basketball.

- Basketball: CIF champions – 1969 through 1974, 1979, 1994-1995, 1998-1999, 2002-2003; runners-up – 1978, 1990, 1993, 1996, 2004
- American football: CIF champions – 1981, 1982, 2006
- Track & field: CIF champions – 1993, 1997, 1998; runners-up – 1979, 1983

Students can choose from 22 extracurricular activities, including working to produce films in partnership with Underground film company with the assistance of J. J. Abrams and Will Smith.

== Notable alumni ==
- Raymond Lewis, 1971, Cal State Los Angeles basketball athlete
- Donny Daniels, 1972, assistant basketball coach, UCLA Bruins
- Roy Hamilton, 1975, NBA athlete (retired)
- David Greenwood, 1975, NBA athlete (retired)
- Leonel Marquetti, 1978, basketball player
- Ken Austin, 1979, NBA Athlete (Detroit Pistons)
- Vernon Maxwell, 1979, NFL athlete (retired)
- Kenny Fields, 1980, NBA athlete (retired)
- Hardy Nickerson, 1983, NFL athlete (retired) and coach
- Andre Miller, 1994, NBA athlete (retired)
- Kenechi Udeze, 2000, NFL athlete (retired)
- Amir Johnson, 2005 (transferred), NBA athlete (Philadelphia 76ers)
- Akeem Ayers, 2007, NFL athlete (Los Angeles Rams)
- Reggie Dunn, 2007, NFL athlete (New England Patriots)
- Jerron "Blind Boy" Paxton, 2007, Musician

== See also ==
- List of Roman Catholic high schools in Los Angeles County, California
