= William Howard Taft High School (New York City) =

Public school in New York City

Location
- 240 East 172nd Street Bronx, NY 10457; 172nd Street and Sheridan Avenue; Morrisania; The Bronx, New York 10457; United States
- Coordinates: 40°50′22″N 73°54′42″W

Information
- School type: Public High School
- Established: 1940s
- Status: Closed
- Closed: June 2008
- School board: New York City Department of Education (NYCDOE)
- School district: NYCDOE Geographic District: 09
- Grades: 9–12
- Campus type: urban
- Athletics conference: Public Schools Athletic League (PSAL)

William Howard Taft High School is a former New York City high school in the southwest section of the Bronx, whose building now houses small specialized high schools. The school was operated by the New York City Department of Education.

The Taft school campus is located on Sheridan Avenue and 172nd Street in the Bronx.

== History ==
Founded in the 1940s, Taft originally served the largely homogeneous population of the surrounding area. In the post-war years of the forties, fifties and sixties. Notable graduates included director Stanley Kubrick, producer Jerry Weintraub, novelist Judith Rossner, and singers Eydie Gormé, Chuck Negron, Luther Vandross, Alan Merrill and Joanna Russ.

Demographic and the advent of specialized magnet schools brought about shifts in enrollment. During the Abraham Beame (1974–1977) and Edward Koch (1978–1989) administrations, citywide, crime rates were high and unfavorable publicity accelerated the decline of the school. By the early 1970s, Taft H.S. earned a reputation as a "failing school" with many of the problems of other high schools in poor, marginalized neighborhoods in New York City.

Entering the 1990s, as a non-selective high school, it was unable to compete with the newer schools housing magnet programs that attracted prime students from throughout the borough. Crime intimidated vibrant young professionals from teaching at the high school. The danger was highlighted in May 1997, when Jonathan Levin, an English teacher at the school and the son of former Time Warner chairman Gerald M. Levin, was murdered by a former student in his Manhattan apartment.

Of the 629 students attending Taft in the 1990s, the majority were Hispanic and African-American. On any given day, attendance hovered around 86%. The impoverished community, lacking in political clout or a cohesive PTA, was provided 10 truancy officers, rather than improved education strategies. The last graduating class of Taft High School was in June 2008.

== Transformation ==
Within the same building, the previously identified "failing school" has been transformed into a series of small specialized high schools to meet modern career needs. The specialty schools are:

- Bronx High School for Medical Science
- Bronx High School of Business
- Bronx Collegiate Academy (formerly Bronx Expeditionary Learning High School)
- Claremont International High School
- DreamYard Preparatory School
- Jonathan Levin High School for Media and Communications
- The Urban Assembly Academy for History and Citizenship for Young Men
- New Directions Secondary School

== Notable alumni ==
- Eddie Carmel (born Oded Ha-Carmeili, 1936–1972), Israeli-born entertainer
- Irwin Dambrot (1928–2010), basketball player
- Eydie Gormé (1928–2013), pop singer
- Richard Gottehrer (born 1940), songwriter, record producer and record label executive
- Artie Green, basketball player
- Joe Hammond, streetball basketball player
- Louise Hay (née Schmir, 1935–1989), French-born mathematician
- Stanley Kubrick (1928–1999), film director, producer, screenwriter, and photographer
- Chuck Negron (1942–2026), singer, songwriter, founding member of the band Three Dog Night
- Ed Roman (1930–1988), college basketball player
- Judith Rossner (1935–2005), novelist
- Ken Rudin, radio journalist
- Joanna Russ (1937–2011), science fiction writer
- Luther Vandross (1951–2005), singer, songwriter, and record producer
- Jerry Weintraub (1937–2015), personal manager, concert promoter, film and television producer, and actor
- Vic Ziegel (1937–2010), sports writer, columnist, and editor
