= Artie Green =

American basketball player

Personal information
- Born: The Bronx, New York, U.S.
- Listed height: 6 ft 1 in (1.85 m)
- Listed weight: 180 lb (82 kg)

Career information
- High school: Taft (The Bronx, New York)
- College: Saddleback (1977–1978); Marquette (1978–1981)
- NBA draft: 1981: 10th round, 221st overall pick
- Drafted by: Milwaukee Bucks
- Position: Point guard
- Stats at Basketball Reference

Artie Green is an American former basketball player. A native of The Bronx, New York, he played at Taft High School and earned a reputation for playing at Rucker Park. Green was known for his dunking ability, earning him the nicknames "Jumping", "High Jumping" and "Grasshopper".

Green played as a 6 ft 1 in (1.85 m) point guard. He started his college basketball career at Saddleback College during the 1977–78 season and spent the following three seasons with the Marquette Warriors. Green was selected by the Milwaukee Bucks as the 221st overall pick of the 1981 NBA draft.
