= Calvin Garrett =

American basketball player

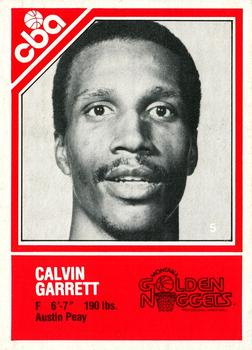

Personal information
- Born: July 11, 1956 (age 70) Parsons, Tennessee, U.S.
- Listed height: 6 ft 7 in (2.01 m)
- Listed weight: 190 lb (86 kg)

Career information
- High school: East Nashville (Nashville, Tennessee)
- College: Austin Peay (1975–1977); Oral Roberts (1978–1980)
- NBA draft: 1979: 3rd round, 47th overall pick
- Drafted by: Chicago Bulls
- Playing career: 1980–1984
- Position: Small forward
- Number: 00, 0

Career history
- 1980–1982: Houston Rockets
- 1982–1983: Montana Golden Nuggets
- 1983–1984: Los Angeles Lakers

Career highlights
- Horizon League Player of the Year (1980)
- Stats at NBA.com
- Stats at Basketball Reference

Calvin Eugene Garrett (born July 11, 1956) is an American retired National Basketball Association (NBA) basketball player. He played three seasons with the Houston Rockets (1980–81 to 1982–83) and one with the Los Angeles Lakers (1983–84). He played in college at Oral Roberts University in Tulsa, Oklahoma.

== Career statistics ==
Legend
| GP | Games played | GS | Games started | MPG | Minutes per game |
| FG% | Field goal percentage | 3P% | 3-point field goal percentage | FT% | Free throw percentage |
| RPG | Rebounds per game | APG | Assists per game | SPG | Steals per game |
| BPG | Blocks per game | PPG | Points per game | **Bold** | Career high |

=== NBA ===
==== Regular season ====
| Year | Team | GP | GS | MPG | FG% | 3P% | FT% | RPG | APG | SPG | BPG | PPG |
|---|---|---|---|---|---|---|---|---|---|---|---|---|
| 1980–81 | Houston | **70** | | **23.4** | .453 | **.333** | .806 | **3.8** | **1.9** | **.7** | **.1** | **6.1** |
| 1981–82 | Houston | 51 | **22** | 16.8 | .434 | .300 | .654 | 1.8 | 1.5 | .6 | **.1** | 4.5 |
| 1982–83 | Houston | 4 | 0 | 8.5 | .364 | .000 | **1.000** | 1.8 | .8 | .0 | .0 | 2.5 |
| 1983–84 | L.A. Lakers | 41 | 0 | 11.7 | **.513** | **.333** | .769 | 1.7 | .8 | .3 | .0 | 4.6 |
| Career | | 166 | 22 | 18.1 | .457 | .300 | .767 | 2.6 | 1.5 | .6 | .1 | 5.2 |

==== Playoffs ====
| Year | Team | GP | MPG | FG% | 3P% | FT% | RPG | APG | SPG | BPG | PPG |
|---|---|---|---|---|---|---|---|---|---|---|---|
| 1981 | Houston | **13** | **9.0** | **.429** | – | **.875** | **1.2** | **.5** | **.4** | **.1** | **1.9** |
| 1982 | Houston | 1 | 1.0 | .000 | .000 | – | .0 | .0 | .0 | .0 | .0 |
| Career | | 14 | 8.4 | .409 | .000 | .875 | 1.1 | .4 | .4 | .1 | 1.8 |
