= Kenny Dennard =

American basketball player

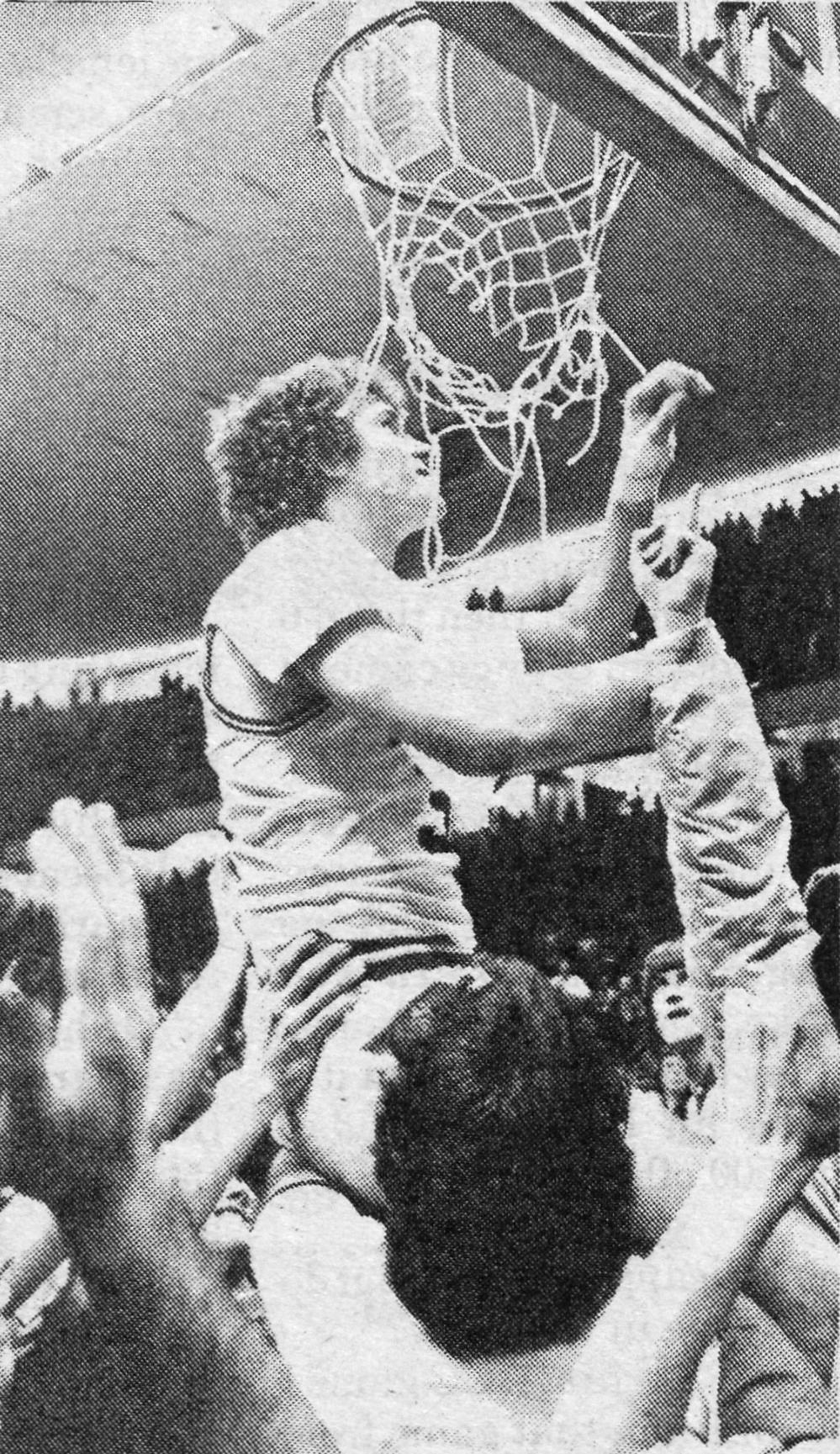
- Dennard cutting down the nets as a freshman at Duke

Personal information
- Born: October 18, 1958 Winston-Salem, North Carolina, U.S.
- Listed height: 6 ft 8 in (2.03 m)
- Listed weight: 220 lb (100 kg)

Career information
- High school: South Stokes (Walnut Cove, North Carolina)
- College: Duke (1977–1981)
- NBA draft: 1981: 4th round, 78th overall pick
- Drafted by: Kansas City Kings
- Position: Power forward
- Number: 9, 33

Career history
- 1981–1982: Montana Golden Nuggets
- 1982–1983: Kansas City Kings
- 1983–1984: Denver Nuggets

Career highlights
- All-CBA First Team (1982)
- Stats at NBA.com
- Stats at Basketball Reference

Kenny Dennard (October 18, 1958) is an American former professional basketball player who competed in the National Basketball Association (NBA) for three seasons. He played college basketball at Duke University, helping the Blue Devils to the 1978 NCAA championship game where the Blue Devils lost to Kentucky, and in the NBA played for the Kansas City Kings and Denver Nuggets. Dennard started his career in the Continental Basketball Association (CBA), where he averaged 10.4 points and 10.1 rebounds in 35 games for the Montana Golden Nuggets in the 1981–82 season and was selected on the All-CBA First Team. Dennard's NBA career was cut short by testicular cancer.

== Career statistics ==
Legend
GP	Games played	GS	Games started	MPG	Minutes per game
FG%	Field goal percentage	3P%	3-point field goal percentage	FT%	Free throw percentage
RPG	Rebounds per game	APG	Assists per game	SPG	Steals per game
BPG	Blocks per game	PPG	Points per game	**Bold**	Career high

=== NBA ===
==== Regular season ====
Year	Team	GP	GS	MPG	FG%	3P%	FT%	RPG	APG	SPG	BPG	PPG
1981–82	Kansas City	30	**3**	**20.2**	**.512**	–	.650	**4.4**	**1.4**	**1.2**	**.3**	**5.0**
1982–83	Kansas City	22	0	10.2	.324	–	**.667**	2.4	.3	.7	.0	1.3
1983–84	Denver	**43**	0	9.6	.364	**.300**	.625	2.3	1.0	.5	.2	2.1
Career		95	3	13.1	.429	.300	.644	3.0	1.0	.8	.2	2.8
