= Leonel Marquetti =

Cuban-American basketball player

Personal information
- Born: June 30, 1959 (age 67) Havana, Cuba
- Listed height: 6 ft 7 in (2.01 m)
- Listed weight: 215 lb (98 kg)

Career information
- High school: Locke (Los Angeles, California); Verbum Dei (Los Angeles, California)
- College: USC (1978–1980); Hampton (1980–1981)
- NBA draft: 1981: 9th round, 199th overall pick
- Drafted by: San Antonio Spurs
- Position: Forward

Career highlights
- First-team Parade All-American (1978); McDonald's All-American (1978)
- Stats at Basketball Reference

Leonel Marquetti (born June 30, 1959) is a Cuban-American former basketball player. He played college basketball for the USC Trojans and Hampton Pirates. Marquetti was selected in the 1981 NBA draft by the San Antonio Spurs but never played in the National Basketball Association (NBA).

In 2011, Marquetti was sentenced to life in prison for the 2010 murder of his ex-girlfriend's handyman.

== Early life and high school career ==
Marquetti was born in Cuba and moved to the United States with his family when he was aged 11 because of "political reasons." His family settled in Lynwood, California, where his father gained work as a tilesetter.

Marquetti was playing basketball in a park league as a ninth grader when he was noticed by Rudy Washington, a junior varsity coach at Locke High School. Marquetti attended Locke until he was declared ineligible because he was playing basketball for a school out of his district.

When Washington became the head coach of the basketball team at Verbum Dei High School, Marquetti transferred there for his junior and senior years. He was nicknamed "Spider Man" because of his leaping ability; he had a vertical jump measured at 43 inches. Marquetti averaged 17.8 points and 16 rebounds per game during his senior season, and was named to the Parade All-American first-team in 1978.

Marquetti estimated that he received between 275 and 300 letters from colleges interested in recruiting him. He committed to play basketball for the USC Trojans where Washington was hired as an assistant coach.

== College career ==
Marquetti averaged 4.8 points and 4.6 rebounds per game during his two seasons with the Trojans. Trojans replaced head coach Bob Boyd with Stan Morrison who wanted to move Marquetti to center instead of forward. Marquetti decided to transfer and was bound to join the Cal State Fullerton Titans until he was prevented by transcript problems. He instead joined the Hampton Pirates.

Marquetti had to sit out his first semester at Hampton but played in 21 of the team's 28 games during the 1980–81 season. He led the team in rebounds with 9.0 per game.

On March 26, 1981, Marquetti declared his intention to claim hardship status for early entry in the 1981 NBA draft. He was selected as the 199th overall pick by the San Antonio Spurs but never played in the National Basketball Association (NBA).

== Murder conviction ==
On March 25, 2010, Marquetti fatally shot his ex-girlfriend's handyman, Michael Hurlbutt, in Plant City, Florida. Prosecutors portrayed Marquetti as a hoarder who struggled losing his girlfriend, Siglinde Sperber, when she ended their 10-year relationship and asked him to move out of their home. Marquetti was agitated when he saw Hurlbutt and Sperber together as they left Sperber's house and shot Hurlbutt four times. Marquetti was convicted by a jury of first-degree murder, aggravated battery with a firearm and false imprisonment. On May 27, 2011, Marquetti was sentenced to life in prison without parole for the murder.

== Personal life ==
Marquetti's nephew, Malik Marquetti, played college basketball for the USC Trojans and Louisiana Ragin' Cajuns.
