= 1981–82 Houston Rockets season =

- Head coach: Del Harris
- General manager: Ray Patterson
- Owner: Gavin Maloof
- Arena: The Summit

Results
- Record: 46–36 (.561)
- Place: Division: 3rd (Midwest); Conference: 6th (Western)
- Playoff finish: West First Round (lost to SuperSonics 1–2)
- Stats at Basketball Reference

Local media
- Television: KHTV
- Radio: KTRH

The 1981–82 Houston Rockets season was the Rockets' 15th season in the NBA and 11th season in the city of Houston. The Rockets entered the season as runner-ups in the 1981 NBA Finals, having lost to the Boston Celtics in six games.

In the playoffs, the Rockets lost to the Seattle SuperSonics in three games in the First Round.

== Draft picks ==
Round	Pick	Player	Position	Nationality	College
2	45	Ed Turner	SF	United States	Texas A&I
4	81	Larry Spriggs	SF	United States	Howard
5	105	Hasan Houston		United States	Bradley
6	127	Fred Cowan		United States	Kentucky
7	151	Joe Faine		United States	Bowling Green State
8	172	Stanley Brewer		United States	West Georgia State

== Roster ==
1981–82 Houston Rockets roster
Players

Pos.	No.	Player	Height	Weight	DOB	From
G	10	Mike Dunleavy	6 ft 1 in (1.85 m)	180 lb (82 kg)		South Carolina
F	00	Calvin Garrett	6 ft 7 in (2.01 m)	190 lb (86 kg)		Oral Roberts
C	44	Elvin Hayes	6 ft 9 in (2.06 m)	235 lb (107 kg)		Houston
G	6	Tom Henderson	6 ft 3 in (1.91 m)	190 lb (86 kg)		Hawaiʻi
F	11	Major Jones (injured)	6 ft 9 in (2.06 m)	225 lb (102 kg)		Albany State
G	30	Allen Leavell	6 ft 1 in (1.85 m)	170 lb (77 kg)		Oklahoma City
C	24	Moses Malone	6 ft 11 in (2.11 m)	235 lb (107 kg)		Petersburg High School
G	23	Calvin Murphy	5 ft 9 in (1.75 m)	165 lb (75 kg)		Niagara
C	51	Jawann Oldham (injured)	7 ft 0 in (2.13 m)	215 lb (98 kg)		Seattle
C	5	Billy Paultz	6 ft 11 in (2.11 m)	235 lb (107 kg)		St. John's
F	50	Robert Reid	6 ft 8 in (2.03 m)	205 lb (93 kg)		Saint Mary's
F	35	Larry Spriggs	6 ft 7 in (2.01 m)	230 lb (104 kg)		Howard
F	32	Bill Willoughby	6 ft 8 in (2.03 m)	205 lb (93 kg)		Dwight Morrow H.S.

Coaches
Head coach
- Del Harris
Assistant(s)
- Carroll Dawson

Legend
- (DP) Unsigned draft pick
- (FA) Free agent
- (S) Suspended
- Injured

== Regular season ==
=== Season standings ===
Midwest Division	W	L	PCT	GB	Home	Road	Div
y-San Antonio Spurs	48	34	.585	–	29–12	19–22	20–10
x-Denver Nuggets	46	36	.561	2.0	29–12	17–24	19–11
x-Houston Rockets	46	36	.561	2.0	25–16	21–20	17–13
Kansas City Kings	30	52	.366	18.0	23–18	7–34	11–19
Dallas Mavericks	28	54	.341	20.0	16–25	12–29	11–19
Utah Jazz	25	57	.305	23.0	18–23	7–34	9–21

#	Western Conference				
#	Team	W	L	PCT	GB
1	c-Los Angeles Lakers	57	25	.695	–
2	y-San Antonio Spurs	48	34	.585	9
3	x-Seattle SuperSonics	52	30	.634	5
4	x-Denver Nuggets	46	36	.561	11
5	x-Phoenix Suns	46	36	.561	11
6	x-Houston Rockets	46	36	.561	11
7	Golden State Warriors	45	37	.549	12
8	Portland Trail Blazers	42	40	.512	15
9	Kansas City Kings	30	52	.366	27
10	Dallas Mavericks	28	54	.341	29
11	Utah Jazz	25	57	.305	32
12	San Diego Clippers	17	65	.207	40

z – clinched division title
y – clinched division title
x – clinched playoff spot

== Game log ==
=== Regular season ===
1981–82 game log
Total: 46–36 (home: 25–16; road: 21–20)
October: 1–1 (home: 0–0; road: 1–1)

Game	Date	Team	Score	High points	High rebounds	High assists	Location Attendance	Record
1	October 30, 1981	@ Los Angeles	W 113–112 (2OT)				The Forum	1–0

November: 5–10 (home: 2–4; road: 3–6)

Game	Date	Team	Score	High points	High rebounds	High assists	Location Attendance	Record
7	November 11, 1981	Los Angeles	L 93–95				The Summit	2–5
13	November 21, 1981	@ Philadelphia	L 106–135				The Spectrum	6–7
17	November 29, 1981	@ Los Angeles	L 104–122				The Forum	6–11

December: 6–7 (home: 4–4; road: 2–3)

Game	Date	Team	Score	High points	High rebounds	High assists	Location Attendance	Record

January: 9–4 (home: 6–2; road: 3–2)

Game	Date	Team	Score	High points	High rebounds	High assists	Location Attendance	Record
43	January 28, 1982	Philadelphia	W 109–101				The Summit	21–22

February: 11–3 (home: 6–0; road: 5–3)

Game	Date	Team	Score	High points	High rebounds	High assists	Location Attendance	Record

March: 9–7 (home: 3–5; road: 6–2)

Game	Date	Team	Score	High points	High rebounds	High assists	Location Attendance	Record
68	March 21, 1982	@ Los Angeles	L 102–107				The Forum	36–32

April: 5–4 (home: 4–1; road: 1–3)

Game	Date	Team	Score	High points	High rebounds	High assists	Location Attendance	Record
76	April 6, 1982	Los Angeles	L 97–108				The Summit	43–33

1981–82 schedule

=== Playoffs ===
1982 playoff game log
First Round: 1–2 (home: 1–0; road: 0–2)

Game	Date	Team	Score	High points	High rebounds	High assists	Location Attendance	Series
1	April 21	@ Seattle	L 87–102	Moses Malone (20)	Moses Malone (15)	Tom Henderson (7)	Kingdome; 14,071	0–1
2	April 23	Seattle	W 91–70	Moses Malone (28)	Moses Malone (23)	Allen Leavell (6)	The Summit; 15,676	1–1
3	April 25	@ Seattle	L 83–104	Moses Malone (24)	Moses Malone (13)	Mike Dunleavy (5)	Kingdome; 14,071	1–2

1982 schedule

== Player statistics ==
Legend
GP	Games played	GS	Games started	MPG	Minutes per game
FG%	Field-goal percentage	3P%	3-point field-goal percentage	FT%	Free-throw percentage
RPG	Rebounds per game	APG	Assists per game	SPG	Steals per game
BPG	Blocks per game	PPG	Points per game

=== Season ===
Player	GP	GS	MPG	FG%	3FG%	FT%	RPG	APG	SPG	BPG	PPG
Mike Dunleavy											
Calvin Garrett											
Elvin Hayes											
Tom Henderson											
Major Jones											
Allen Leavell											
Moses Malone											
Calvin Murphy											
Jawann Oldham											
Billy Paultz											
Robert Reid											
Larry Spriggs											

=== Playoffs ===
Player	GP	GS	MPG	FG%	3FG%	FT%	RPG	APG	SPG	BPG	PPG

== Awards and records ==
- Moses Malone, NBA Most Valuable Player Award
- Moses Malone, All-NBA First Team

== Transactions ==
- June 8, 1981: Traded a 1981 2nd round draft pick (Charles Davis) and a 1983 2nd round draft pick to the Washington Bullets for Elvin Hayes.
