= Jonathan Levin High School for Media and Communications =

Public school in New York City

Coordinates: 40°50′23″N 73°54′40″W

Location
- 240 E. 172nd St. The Bronx; New York City

Information
- Type: Public high school
- Closed: 2016
- Principal: Nasib Hoxha
- Grades: 10–12
- Gender: Co-ed

Jonathan Levin High School for Media and Communications was a public high school located in The Bronx, New York City. It was one of six smaller specialty high schools located on the campus of the former William H. Taft High School, which was closed in 2008 and divided into separate collocated specialty schools. It closed in June 2016.

== Purpose of the Levin School ==
Jonathan Levin High School specialized in the development of skills used in the film industry through hands on training. The school's enrollment declined quickly due to the phase out process: 249 students as of September 2013. According to the NYC Department of Education website: “Students are introduced to the fields of photography, web design and film and will gain the skills and knowledge necessary to contribute to an institution of higher learning and/or the workforce.”

The school's motto is “We come together as one to make a difference”.

== Levin School Phase Out ==
New York State ruled in 2013 the high school was to be phased out. No new students were admitted in September 2013. The 12th grade graduated in June 2014, the 11th grade graduated in June 2015, and the 10th grade graduated in June 2016. At that point, the school was permanently closed.

== Name ==
Jonathan Levin High School was named for Jonathan Levin, a teacher at the former Taft High School, who was murdered by a student in 1997.

== Achievements ==
- Received an 'A' grade in the 2007-2008 NYC School Progress Reports survey.

== See also ==
- List of high schools in New York City
