= Ed Turner (basketball) =

American basketball player

Personal information
- Born: November 20, 1957 (age 68) Buffalo, New York, U.S.
- Listed height: 6 ft 6 in (1.98 m)
- Listed weight: 195 lb (88 kg)

Career information
- High school: East (Buffalo, New York)
- College: Indian River CC (1977–1978); Texas A&M–Kingsville (1978–1981)
- NBA draft: 1981: 2nd round, 45th overall pick
- Drafted by: Houston Rockets
- Position: Small forward
- Stats at Basketball Reference

Edward Lee Turner (born November 20, 1957) is an American former basketball player who played for three years at Texas A&I University (now Texas A&M University–Kingsville), where he averaged 22.9 points, 12.8 rebounds, and 5.9 assists per game for his career. He was drafted by the Houston Rockets in the second round of the 1981 NBA draft, but he did not play in the NBA.
