= Randy Smithson =

American college basketball coach (born 1958)

Biographical details
- Born: November 17, 1958 (age 67)

Playing career
- 1979–1981: Wichita State
- Position: Shooting guard

Coaching career (HC unless noted)
- 1985–1996: Butler County Community College
- 1996–2000: Wichita State

Head coaching record
- Overall: 55–62

Randy Smithson (born November 17, 1958) is an American college basketball coach. He was the head coach at Wichita State University from 1996 to 2000.
