= Jeff Cohen (sports executive) =

Biographical details
- Education: Brandeis University

Administrative career (AD unless noted)
- 1969–81: Boston Celtics (Asst. GM)
- 1981–82: Kansas City Kings (GM)
- 1982–83: Boston Breakers (EVP)
- 1986–2004: Brandeis

Accomplishments and honors

Championships
- 5× NBA Finals champion (1966, 1968, 1969, 1974, 1976)

Jeffrey Cohen is an American sports executive who served as general manager of the Kansas City Kings from 1981 to 1982 and athletic director at Brandeis University from 1986 to 2004. Before joining the Kings, Cohen spent 16 years with the Boston Celtics, rising to the position of assistant general manager.

== Early life ==
Cohen is the son of Sam Cohen, a sports editor for The Boston Record, the Boston Record American, and the Boston Herald American. The elder Cohen was close friends with Boston Celtics head coach and general manager Red Auerbach.

== NBA ==
Cohen graduated in 1964 from Brandeis University, where he majored in history. After doing graduate work at the University of California and working for the Baltimore News-American, he joined the Celtics as a part-time assistant to publicist Howie McHugh. In 1969, he became the club's assistant general manager. In 1979, he interviewed to become general manager of the Kansas City Kings but was passed over in favor of John Begzos. The position opened up again a year later, and on January 23, 1981, the Kings announced Cohen as their new GM. He joined the team on March 1, 1981. His stint in Kansas City lasted just over a year, as on April 30, 1982, the Kings announced that former general manager Joe Axelson would be returning to the club. In his only season as GM, the Kings failed to follow up a surprise conference finals run by finishing 30-52 and missing the playoffs.

== Brandeis ==
In September 1982, Cohen was named executive vice president of the Boston Breakers of the newly-formed United States Football League. The team lasted only one season in Boston before leaving for New Orleans. Cohen did not move with the team, instead joining the development office at Brandeis. In 1986, he became the school's athletic director. During his tenure as AD, Brandeis joined the University Athletic Association, constructed a $25 million sports complex which included the Red Auerbach Arena, launched an athletic hall of fame, hosted the 1998 NCAA Division III Men's and Women's Indoor Track and Field Championships and 1999 NCAA Fencing Championships, and hired former Celtics head coach Chris Ford to coach its men's basketball team. In 1999, he was named the Jostens-Eastern College Athletic Conference Male Administrator of the Year. In January 2004, Cohen abruptly resigned from Brandeis, telling The Boston Globe that he was leaving because "lame duck is not a good thing to be. I'd be in the way. I love Brandeis, and I don't want to be in the way". Later that year, he moved to Colorado Springs, Colorado to become the director of athletic programs for the United States Fencing Association.
