= Oregon State Beavers men's basketball statistical leaders =

The Oregon State Beavers men's basketball statistical leaders are individual statistical leaders of the Oregon State Beavers men's basketball program in various categories, including points, three-pointers, assists, blocks, rebounds, and steals. Within those areas, the lists identify single-game, single-season, and career leaders. As of the next college basketball season in 2026–27, the Beavers represent Oregon State University in the NCAA Division I Pac-12 Conference.

Oregon State began competing in intercollegiate basketball in 1901. The NCAA did not officially record assists as a stat until the 1983–84 season, and blocks and steals until the 1985–86 season, but Oregon State's record books includes players in these stats before these seasons. These lists are updated through the end of the 2020–21 season.

== Scoring ==
Career
Rk	Player	Points	Seasons
1	Tres Tinkle	2,233	2015–16 2016–17 2017–18 2018–19 2019–20
2	Gary Payton	2,172	1986–87 1987–88 1988–89 1989–90
3	Steve Johnson	2,035	1976–77 1977–78 1978–79 1979–80 1980–81
4	Mel Counts	1,973	1961–62 1962–63 1963–64
5	Stephen Thompson Jr.	1,767	2015–16 2016–17 2017–18 2018–19
6	Roberto Nelson	1,745	2010–11 2011–12 2012–13 2013–14
7	Ethan Thompson	1,716	2017–18 2018–19 2019–20 2020–21
8	A.C. Green	1,694	1981–82 1982–83 1983–84 1984–85
9	Charlie Sitton	1,561	1980–81 1981–82 1982–83 1983–84
10	Devon Collier	1,489	2010–11 2011–12 2012–13 2013–14

Season
Rk	Player	Points	Season
1	Mel Counts	775	1963–64
2	Gary Payton	746	1989–90
3	Jose Ortiz	668	1986–87
4	Roberto Nelson	663	2013–14
5	Mel Counts	661	1962–63
6	Jared Cunningham	645	2011–12
7	Tres Tinkle	624	2018–19
8	Swede Halbrook	614	1953–54
9	Gary Payton	603	1988–89
10	A.C. Green	591	1984–85

Single game
Rk	Player	Points	Season	Opponent
1	Gary Payton	58	1989–90	USC
2	Gary Payton	48	1989–90	Loyola Marymount
	Mel Counts	48	1963–64	LSU
4	Nollie Reed	47	1906–07	Winlock AC
5	Mel Counts	42	1963–64	Indiana
6	Gary Payton	41	1988–89	Washington State
7	Gary Payton	39	1989–90	Tennessee
	A.C. Green	39	1984–85	Stanford
9	Jose Ortiz	38	1986–87	San Jose State
	Steve Johnson	38	1980–81	Washington
	Steve Johnson	38	1979–80	BYU
	Mel Counts	38	1963–64	Oregon
	Mel Counts	38	1963–64	Cincinnati
	Mel Counts	38	1963–64	Washington State
	Red Rocha	38	1946–47	Idaho

== Rebounds ==
Career
Rk	Player	Rebounds	Seasons
1	Mel Counts	1,375	1961–62 1962–63 1963–64
2	Tres Tinkle	882	2015–16 2016–17 2017–18 2018–19 2019–20
3	A.C. Green	880	1981–82 1982–83 1983–84 1984–85
4	Dave Gambee	828	1955–56 1956–57 1957–58
5	Steve Johnson	785	1976–77 1977–78 1978–79 1979–80 1980–81
6	Eric Moreland	762	2010–11 2011–12 2012–13 2013–14
7	Joe Burton	730	2009–10 2010–11 2011–12 2012–13
8	Jay Carty	691	1959–60 1960–61 1961–62
9	Devon Collier	679	2010–11 2011–12 2012–13 2013–14
10	Sam Whitehead	669	1970–71 1971–72 1972–73

Season
Rk	Player	Rebounds	Season
1	Mel Counts	489	1963–64
2	Mel Counts	485	1962–63
3	Mel Counts	401	1961–62
4	Swede Halbrook	344	1953–54
5	Bob Payne	341	1950–51
6	Eric Moreland	307	2012–13
7	Jay Carty	304	1961–62
8	Lonnie Shelton	292	1974–75
9	A.C. Green	286	1984–85
10	Dave Gambee	285	1957–58

Single game
Rk	Player	Rebounds	Season	Opponent
1	Swede Halbrook	36	1954–55	Idaho
2	Swede Halbrook	32	1954–55	Idaho
3	Mel Counts	25	1962–63	Washington
	Swede Halbrook	25	1953–54	Hawaii
5	Mel Counts	24	1963–64	Portland
	Mel Counts	24	1963–64	Indiana
	Mel Counts	24	1962–63	Oregon
	Mel Counts	24	1962–63	Iowa
9	Mel Counts	23	1962–63	California
	Mel Counts	23	1962–63	Seattle
	Dave Gambee	23	1955–56	Northwestern

== Assists ==
Career
Rk	Player	Assists	Seasons
1	Gary Payton	938	1986–87 1987–88 1988–89 1989–90
2	George Tucker	525	1973–74 1974–75 1975–76 1976–77
3	Ethan Thompson	499	2017–18 2018–19 2019–20 2020–21
4	Deaundra Tanner	457	1997–98 1998–99 1999–00 2000–01
	Darryl Flowers	457	1982–83 1983–84 1984–85 1985–86
6	Dwayne Allen	426	1976–77 1977–78 1978–79 1979–80
7	Charlie Neal	417	1972–73 1973–74 1974–75
8	Mark Radford	401	1977–78 1978–79 1979–80 1980–81
9	Tres Tinkle	374	2015–16 2016–17 2017–18 2018–19 2019–20
	Lamar Hurd	374	2002–03 2003–04 2004–05 2005–06
	Eric Knox	374	1984–85 1986–87 1987–88 1988–89

Season
Rk	Player	Assists	Season
1	Gary Payton	244	1988–89
2	Gary Payton	235	1989–90
3	Gary Payton	230	1987–88
4	Gary Payton	229	1986–87
5	Freddie Boyd	185	1971–72
6	Freddie Boyd	177	1970–71
7	George Tucker	175	1976–77
8	Damarco Minor	167	2024–25
9	Gary Payton II	161	2015–16
10	George Tucker	159	1974–75

Single game
Rk	Player	Assists	Season	Opponent
1	Gary Payton	15	1989–90	Arizona State
2	Gary Payton	14	1988–89	St. Joseph’s
	Gary Payton	14	1986–87	Idaho
	Dwayne Allen	14	1978–79	Portland State
	George Tucker	14	1976–77	Stanford
	Charlie Neal	14	1973–74	Washington State
7	Gary Payton	13	1989–90	Oregon
	Gary Payton	13	1989–90	Memphis State
	Gary Payton	13	1988–89	Washington
	Gary Payton	13	1987–88	USC
	Gary Payton	13	1986–87	California
	Charlie Neal	13	1973–74	Hawaii
	Freddie Boyd	13	1971–72	Washington

== Steals ==
Career
Rk	Player	Steals	Seasons
1	Gary Payton	321	1986–87 1987–88 1988–89 1989–90
2	Jared Cunningham	219	2009–10 2010–11 2011–12
3	Ray Blume	205	1977–78 1978–79 1979–80 1980–81
4	Brent Barry	199	1991–92 1992–93 1993–94 1994–95
5	Tres Tinkle	196	2015–16 2016–17 2017–18 2018–19 2019–20
6	Mark Radford	184	1977–78 1978–79 1979–80 1980–81
7	Deaundra Tanner	179	1997–98 1998–99 1999–00 2000–01
8	Eric Knox	178	1984–85 1986–87 1987–88 1988–89
9	Stephen Thompson Jr.	177	2015–16 2016–17 2017–18 2018–19
	Seth Tarver	177	2006–07 2007–08 2008–09 2009–10

Season
Rk	Player	Steals	Season
1	Gary Payton	100	1989–90
2	Gary Payton II	95	2014–15
3	Jared Cunningham	91	2011–12
	Gary Payton	91	1988–89
	Lester Conner	91	1981–82
6	Jared Cunningham	85	2010–11
7	Gary Payton II	60	2015–16
8	Brent Barry	72	1994–95
	Gary Payton	72	1987–88
10	Seth Tarver	70	2009–10

Single game
Rk	Player	Steals	Season	Opponent
1	Jared Cunningham	8	2009–10	Washington State
	Seth Tarver	8	2009–10	Cal State Bakersfield
	Brent Barry	8	1994–95	Arizona
4	Gary Payton II	7	2015–16	Colorado
	Jared Cunningham	7	2010–11	Charlotte
	Marcel Jones	7	2006–07	Stanford
	Deaundra Tanner	7	1997–98	Hawaii-Hilo
	Brent Barry	7	1994–95	Stanford
	Mario Jackson	7	1990–91	Washington State
	Allan Celestine	7	1990–91	Fresno State
	Gary Payton	7	1988–89	UCLA
	Lester Conner	7	1981–82	Washington
	Lester Conner	7	1981–82	Stanford
	Lester Conner	7	1981–82	Portland
	Lester Conner	7	1980–81	UCLA
	George Tucker	7	1975–76	Washington State
	Charlie Neal	7	1974–75	Middle Tenn. State

== Blocks ==
Career
Rk	Player	Blocks	Seasons
1	Kylor Kelley	211	2018–19 2019–20
2	Eric Moreland	184	2010–11 2011–12 2012–13 2013–14
3	Scott Haskin	172	1988–89 1989–90 1991–92 1992–93
4	Drew Eubanks	163	2015–16 2016–17 2017–18
5	Devon Collier	134	2010–11 2011–12 2012–13 2013–14
6	Steve Johnson	114	1976–77 1977–78 1978–79 1979–80 1980–81
7	Nick DeWitz	111	2004–05 2005–06
8	Kyle Jeffers	97	2003–04 2004–05 2005–06 2006–07
9	Will Brantley	85	1987–88 1988–89 1989–90 1990–91
10	Philip Ricci	75	2001–02 2002–03

Season
Rk	Player	Blocks	Season
1	Kylor Kelley	107	2019–20
2	Kylor Kelley	104	2018–19
3	Eric Moreland	73	2012–13
4	Drew Eubanks	69	2016–17
	Eric Moreland	69	2011–12
6	Scott Haskin	68	1991–92
7	Nick DeWitz	59	2005–06
8	Drew Eubanks	55	2017–18
9	Nick DeWitz	52	2004–05
10	Scott Haskin	51	1992–93

Single game
Rk	Player	Blocks	Season	Opponent
1	Kylor Kelley	9	2018–19	Pepperdine
2	Kylor Kelley	7	2019–20	Stanford
	Kylor Kelley	7	2019–20	Arkansas-Pine Bluff
	Kylor Kelley	7	2019–20	Grambling State
	Kylor Kelley	7	2018–19	USC
	Drew Eubanks	7	2016–17	Prairie View A&M
	Gary Payton II	7	2014–15	Colorado
8	Kylor Kelley	6	2019–20	Portland State
	Kylor Kelley	6	2019–20	UC Santa Barbara
	Kylor Kelley	6	2018–19	Utah
	Drew Eubanks	6	2017–18	UCLA
	Drew Eubanks	6	2017–18	Colorado
	Drew Eubanks	6	2016–17	Utah
	Drew Eubanks	6	2016–17	Savannah State
	Drew Eubanks	6	2016–17	Lamar
	Eric Moreland	6	2012–13	Towson
	Eric Moreland	6	2011–12	Stanford
	Nick DeWitz	6	2005–06	Texas-Pan American
	Clifton Jones	6	1998–99	Oregon
	Todd Marshall	6	1996–97	Bradley
	Steve Johnson	6	1978–79	Gonzaga
	Steve Johnson	6	1978–79	Wyoming
