= 1979–80 Oregon State Beavers men's basketball team =

American college basketball season

1979–80 Oregon State Beavers men's basketball

Pac-10 champions

NCAA tournament, Second Round
- Conference: Pac-10 Conference

Ranking
- Coaches: No. 5
- AP: No. 5
- Record: 26–4 (16–2 Pac-10)
- Head coach: Ralph Miller (10th season)
- Home arena: Gill Coliseum

1979–80 Pacific-10 Conference men's basketball standings
	Conf.				Overall
Team	W		L	PCT	W		L	PCT
^#5 Oregon State	16	–	2	.889	26	–	3	.897
No. 18 Arizona State	15	–	3	.833	22	–	7	.759
Washington State	14	–	4	.778	22	–	6	.786
*UCLA	12	–	6	.667	17	–	9	.654
Washington	9	–	9	.500	18	–	10	.643
Arizona	6	–	12	.333	12	–	15	.444
USC	5	–	13	.278	12	–	15	.444
Oregon	5	–	13	.278	10	–	17	.370
Stanford	5	–	13	.278	7	–	19	.269
California	3	–	15	.167	8	–	19	.296
As of April 15, 1980; *Oregon State vacated all tournament games (0–1) due to NCAA sanctions. Disputed record (16-2, 26-4)^UCLA vacated all tournament games (5–1) due to NCAA sanctions. Disputed record (22-10, 12-6); Rankings from AP Poll

The 1979–80 Oregon State Beavers men's basketball team represented the Oregon State University as a member of the Pacific 10 Conference during the 1979–80 NCAA Division I men's basketball season. They were led by 10th-year head coach Ralph Miller and played their home games on campus at Gill Coliseum in Corvallis, Oregon.

== Roster ==
1979–80 Oregon State Beavers men's basketball team
Players
Coaches

Pos.	#	Name	Height	Weight	Year	Hometown
G	22	Ray Blume	6 ft 4 in (1.93 m)	—	Jr
G	32	Lester Conner	6 ft 4 in (1.93 m)	180 lb (82 kg)	So	Oakland, California
F/C	55	Steve Johnson	6 ft 10 in (2.08 m)	230 lb (104 kg)	Jr	San Bernardino, California

Head coach

- Ralph Miller

Assistant coach(es)

Legend

- (C) Team captain
- (S) Suspended
- (I) Ineligible
- (W) Walk-on
- Injured
- Current redshirt

== Schedule and results ==
Date time, TV	Rank^{#}	Opponent^{#}	Result	Record	Site city, state
Regular season
Dec 7, 1979*		at Hawaii	W 75–74	1–0	Neal S. Blaisdell Center; Honolulu, Hawaii
Dec 8, 1979*		at Hawaii	W 92–62	2–0	Neal S. Blaisdell Center; Honolulu, Hawaii
Dec 14, 1979*		at Portland	L 86–94	2–1	Howard Hall; Portland, Oregon
Dec 15, 1979*		Portland State	W 92–71	3–1	Gill Coliseum; Corvallis, Oregon
Dec 17, 1979*		Montana State	W 105–80	4–1	Gill Coliseum; Corvallis, Oregon
Mar 1, 1980		Oregon	W 67–55	26–3 (16–2)	Gill Coliseum; Corvallis, Oregon
NCAA Tournament
Mar 8, 1980*	(2 W) No. 5	vs. (10 W) Lamar; Second round	L 77–81	26–4	Dee Events Center; Ogden, Utah
*Non-conference game. ^{#}Rankings from AP Poll. (#) Tournament seedings in parentheses. W=West. All times are in Pacific.

== Awards and honors ==
- Ray Blume – AP Second-team All-American
- Steve Johnson – AP Honorable mention All-American
