= 1980 NCAA Men's Basketball All-Americans =

- Awarded for: 1979–80 NCAA Division I men's basketball season

The Consensus 1980 College Basketball All-American team, as determined by aggregating the results of four major All-American teams. To earn "consensus" status, a player must win honors from a majority of the following teams: the Associated Press, the USBWA, The United Press International and the National Association of Basketball Coaches.

== 1980 Consensus All-America team ==
Consensus First Team
Player	Position	Class	Team
Mark Aguirre	F	Sophomore	DePaul
Michael Brooks	F	Senior	La Salle
Joe Barry Carroll	C	Senior	Purdue
Darrell Griffith	G	Senior	Louisville
Kyle Macy	G	Senior	Kentucky

Consensus Second Team
Player	Position	Class	Team
Mike Gminski	C	Senior	Duke
Albert King	F	Junior	Maryland
Mike O'Koren	F	Senior	North Carolina
Kelvin Ransey	G	Senior	Ohio State
Sam Worthen	G	Senior	Marquette

== Individual All-America teams ==
All-America Team
All-America Team	First team		Second team		Third team	
All-America Team	Player	School	Player	School	Player	School
Associated Press	Mark Aguirre	DePaul	Ray Blume	Oregon State	Rolando Blackman	Kansas State
Associated Press	Joe Barry Carroll	Purdue	Michael Brooks	La Salle	Lewis Lloyd	Drake
Associated Press	Darrell Griffith	Louisville	Reggie Carter	St. John's	John Stroud	Mississippi
Associated Press	Albert King	Maryland	Don Collins	Washington State	Herb Williams	Ohio State
Associated Press	Kyle Macy	Kentucky	Mike Gminski	Duke	Sam Worthen	Marquette
USBWA	Mark Aguirre	DePaul	Roosevelt Bouie	Syracuse	No third team	
USBWA	Michael Brooks	La Salle	Mike O'Koren	North Carolina	No third team	
USBWA	Joe Barry Carroll	Purdue	Kelvin Ransey	Ohio State	No third team	
USBWA	Darrell Griffith	Louisville	Charles Whitney	North Carolina State	No third team	
USBWA	Kyle Macy	Kentucky	Sam Worthen	Marquette	No third team	
NABC	Mark Aguirre	DePaul	Mike Gminski	Duke	Danny Ainge	Brigham Young
NABC	Michael Brooks	La Salle	Albert King	Maryland	Roosevelt Bouie	Syracuse
NABC	Joe Barry Carroll	Purdue	Mike O'Koren	North Carolina	Kelvin Ransey	Ohio State
NABC	Darrell Griffith	Louisville	Mike Woodson	Indiana	Jeff Ruland	Iona
NABC	Kyle Macy	Kentucky	Sam Worthen	Marquette	Charles Whitney	North Carolina State
UPI	Mark Aguirre	DePaul	Reggie Carter	St. John's	Roosevelt Bouie	Syracuse
UPI	Michael Brooks	La Salle	Mike Gminski	Duke	Jeff Lamp	Virginia
UPI	Joe Barry Carroll	Purdue	Albert King	Maryland	Lewis Lloyd	Drake
UPI	Darrell Griffith	Louisville	Mike O'Koren	North Carolina	Kelly Tripucka	Notre Dame
UPI	Kyle Macy	Kentucky	Kelvin Ransey	Ohio State	Sam Worthen	Marquette

AP Honorable Mention:

- Danny Ainge, BYU
- Gene Banks, Duke
- Earl Belcher, St. Bonaventure
- Kim Belton, Stanford
- Curtis Berry, Missouri
- Roosevelt Bouie, Syracuse
- Boo Bowers, American
- Sam Bowie, Kentucky
- Kevin Boyle, Iowa
- Clyde Bradshaw, DePaul
- Ricardo Brown, Pepperdine
- Rickey Brown, Mississippi State
- Don Carfino, USC
- Sam Clancy, Pittsburgh
- Darwin Cook, Portland
- Ron Cornelius, Pacific
- Terry Cummings, DePaul
- Kenny Cunningham, Western Michigan
- Larry Drew, Missouri
- John Duren, Georgetown
- Rod Foster, UCLA
- Calvin Garrett, Oral Roberts
- Sidney Green, UNLV
- Rufus Harris, Maine
- Ernie Hill, Oklahoma City
- Reggie Johnson, Tennessee
- Steve Johnson, Oregon State
- Jeff Lamp, Virginia
- Rudy Macklin, LSU
- Ethan Martin, LSU
- Jim McCloskey, Loyola Marymount
- Kevin McHale, Minnesota
- Jack Moore, Nebraska
- Tony Murphy, Southern
- Carl Nicks, Indiana State
- Kurt Nimphius, Arizona State
- Mike O'Koren, North Carolina
- Louis Orr, Syracuse
- Mike Perry, Richmond
- Ron Perry, Holy Cross
- Wally Rank, San Jose State
- Kelvin Ransey, Ohio State
- Jeff Ruland, Iona
- Ralph Sampson, Virginia
- DeWayne Scales, LSU
- Craig Shelton, Georgetown
- Andre Smith, Nebraska
- Larry Smith, Alcorn State
- Steve Stipanovich, Missouri
- Terry Teagle, Baylor
- Isiah Thomas, Indiana
- Corny Thompson, Connecticut
- James Tillman, Eastern Kentucky
- Andrew Toney, Southwestern Louisiana
- Darnell Valentine, Kansas
- Ronnie Valentine, Old Dominion
- Kiki VanDeWeghe, UCLA
- Jay Vincent, Michigan State
- Hawkeye Whitney, NC State
- Michael Wiley, Long Beach State
- Billy Williams, Clemson
- Buck Williams, Maryland
- Francois Wise, Long Beach State
- Al Wood, North Carolina
- Rudy Woods, Texas A&M
- Mike Woodson, Indiana
- Orlando Woolridge, Notre Dame

== Academic All-Americans ==
On April 18, 1980, CoSIDA announced the 1980 Academic All-America team. The following is the 1979–80 Academic All-America Men's Basketball Team as selected by CoSIDA:

Academic All-America Team
Player	School	Class
Danny Ainge	BYU	Junior
Rich Branning	Notre Dame	Senior
Mike Campbell	Northwestern	Senior
Mike Gminski	Duke	Senior
Dean Hunger	Utah State	Senior
Andy Kolesar	VMI	Junior
Ron Perry	Holy Cross	Senior
Terry Stotts	Oklahoma	Senior
Darnell Valentine	Kansas	Junior
Kiki Vandeweghe	UCLA	Senior
