= 1981 NCAA Men's Basketball All-Americans =

- Awarded for: 1980–81 NCAA Division I men's basketball season

The Consensus 1981 NCAA Men's Basketball All-American team, as determined by aggregating the results of four major All-American teams. To earn "consensus" status, a player must win honors from a majority of the following teams: the Associated Press, the USBWA, The United Press International and the National Association of Basketball Coaches.

== 1981 Consensus All-America team ==
Consensus First Team
Player	Position	Class	Team
Mark Aguirre	F	Junior	DePaul
Danny Ainge	G	Senior	Brigham Young
Steve Johnson	C	Senior	Oregon State
Ralph Sampson	C	Sophomore	Virginia
Isiah Thomas	G	Sophomore	Indiana

Consensus Second Team
Player	Position	Class	Team
Sam Bowie	C	Sophomore	Kentucky
Jeff Lamp	F	Senior	Virginia
Rudy Macklin	F	Senior	Louisiana State
Kelly Tripucka	F	Senior	Notre Dame
Danny Vranes	F	Senior	Utah
Al Wood	F	Senior	North Carolina

== Individual All-America teams ==
All-America Team
All-America Team	First team		Second team		Third team	
All-America Team	Player	School	Player	School	Player	School
Associated Press	Mark Aguirre	DePaul	Eric Floyd	Georgetown	Sam Bowie	Kentucky
Associated Press	Danny Ainge	Brigham Young	Steve Johnson	Oregon State	Jeff Lamp	Virginia
Associated Press	Kevin Magee	UC Irvine	Darnell Valentine	Kansas	Lewis Lloyd	Drake
Associated Press	Ralph Sampson	Virginia	Danny Vranes	Utah	Jay Vincent	Michigan State
Associated Press	Isiah Thomas	Indiana	Al Wood	North Carolina	Rob Williams	Houston
USBWA	Mark Aguirre	DePaul	Danny Ainge	Brigham Young	No third team	
USBWA	Steve Johnson	Oregon State	Sam Bowie	Kentucky	No third team	
USBWA	Rudy Macklin	Louisiana State	Jeff Lamp	Virginia	No third team	
USBWA	Ralph Sampson	Virginia	Isiah Thomas	Indiana	No third team	
USBWA	Al Wood	North Carolina	Danny Vranes	Utah	No third team	
NABC	Mark Aguirre	DePaul	Sam Bowie	Kentucky	Gene Banks	Duke
NABC	Danny Ainge	Brigham Young	Rudy Macklin	Louisiana State	Rolando Blackman	Kansas State
NABC	Steve Johnson	Oregon State	Kelly Tripucka	Notre Dame	Albert King	Maryland
NABC	Ralph Sampson	Virginia	Danny Vranes	Utah	Jeff Lamp	Virginia
NABC	Isiah Thomas	Indiana	Al Wood	North Carolina	Lewis Lloyd	Drake
UPI	Mark Aguirre	DePaul	Rod Foster	UCLA	Ray Blume	Oregon State
UPI	Danny Ainge	Brigham Young	Steve Johnson	Oregon State	Sam Bowie	Kentucky
UPI	Ralph Sampson	Virginia	Albert King	Maryland	Clyde Bradshaw	DePaul
UPI	Isiah Thomas	Indiana	Jeff Lamp	Virginia	Lewis Lloyd	Drake
UPI	Kelly Tripucka	Notre Dame	Rudy Macklin	Louisiana State	Danny Vranes	Utah

AP Honorable Mention:

- John Bagley, Boston College
- Gene Banks, Duke
- Earl Belcher, St. Bonaventure
- Curtis Berry, Missouri
- Rolando Blackman, Kansas State
- Ray Blume, Oregon State
- Kevin Boyle, Iowa
- Clyde Bradshaw, DePaul
- Darrell Browder, TCU
- David Burns, Saint Louis
- Antoine Carr, Wichita State
- Mike Carroll, Texas–Pan American
- Howard Carter, LSU
- Tom Chambers, Utah
- Jamie Ciampaglio, Wagner
- Sam Clancy, Pittsburgh
- Riley Clarida, Long Island
- Matt Clark, Oklahoma
- Darius Clemons, Loyola (IL)
- Bob Convey, Saint Francis (PA)
- Ron Cornelius, Pacific
- Quintin Dailey, San Francisco
- Ron Davis, Arizona
- Mickey Dillard, Florida State
- Ronnie Dixon, Duquesne
- Mike Evelti, Vermont
- Mike Ferrara, Colgate
- Rod Foster, UCLA
- Ricky Frazier, Missouri
- Zam Fredrick, South Carolina
- Bob Fronk, Washington
- Ken Green, Texas–Pan American
- Andra Griffin, Washington
- Pete Harris, Northeastern
- Scott Hastings, Arkansas
- Len Hatzenbeller, Drexel
- Rod Higgins, Fresno State
- Angelo Hill, Washington State
- Jo Jo Hunter, Colorado
- Eddie Johnson, Illinois
- Frank Johnson, Wake Forest
- Harry Kelly, Texas Southern
- Albert King, Maryland
- Larry Lawrence, Dartmouth
- Cliff Levingston, Wichita State
- Alton Lister, Arizona State
- Durand Macklin, LSU
- Jeff Malone, Mississippi State
- Greg Manning, Maryland
- Ethan Martin, LSU
- David Maxwell, Fordham
- Ronnie McAdoo, Old Dominion
- Jim McCloskey, Loyola Marymount
- Mike McGee, Michigan
- Mark McNamara, California
- Larry Nance, Clemson
- Mike Olliver, Lamar
- Michael Perry, Richmond
- Eddie Phillips, Alabama
- Ricky Pierce, Rice
- John Pinone, Villanova
- Mark Radford, Oregon State
- David Russell, St. John's
- Mike Sanders, UCLA
- Danny Schayes, Syracuse
- Byron Scott, Arizona State
- Tom Seaman, Holy Cross
- Jose Slaughter, Portland
- Andre Smith, Nebraska
- Derek Smith, Louisville
- Dale Solomon, Virginia Tech
- Gary Springer, Iona
- Mike Strayhorn, William & Mary
- Terry Teagle, Baylor
- Linton Townes, James Madison
- Corny Thompson, Connecticut
- LaSalle Thompson, Texas
- Kelly Tripucka, Notre Dame
- Kelvin Troy, Rutgers
- Elston Turner, Ole Miss
- David Vann, Saint Mary's
- Ken Webb, Fairleigh Dickinson
- Buck Williams, Maryland
- Sam Williams, Arizona State
- Sid Williams, San Jose State
- Dominique Wilkins, Georgia
- Jim Wright, Rhode Island
