= Ray Blume =

American basketball player (born 1958)

Personal information
- Born: September 23, 1958 (age 68) Valdosta, Georgia, U.S.
- Listed height: 6 ft 4 in (1.93 m)
- Listed weight: 185 lb (84 kg)

Career information
- High school: Parkrose (Portland, Oregon)
- College: Oregon State (1977–1981)
- NBA draft: 1981: 2nd round, 36th overall pick
- Drafted by: Indiana Pacers
- Playing career: 1981–1985
- Position: Point guard
- Number: 22

Career history
- 1981–1982: Chicago Bulls
- 1984–1985: Monaco

Career highlights
- Second-team All-American – AP (1980); Third-team All-American – UPI (1981); 2× First-team All-Pac-10 (1980, 1981)
- Stats at NBA.com
- Stats at Basketball Reference

Bernard Ray Blume (born September 23, 1958) is an American former basketball player. Blume achieved his greatest career success at the collegiate level as a guard for an Oregon State University Beavers men's basketball. During Blume's four-year tenure the team went 86–27 and made the NCAA tournament twice. Blume won All-American honors in 1980 and was All-Conference in 1980 and 1981. He was inducted into the Oregon State Athletic Hall of Fame in 2004 and into the Pac-12 Conference Basketball Hall of Honor in 2017.

Blume spent the 1981–82 season as a reserve for the Chicago Bulls of the National Basketball Association before playing the sport professionally in Europe.

== Biography ==
=== Early years ===
Bernard Ray Blume, commonly known by his middle name, was born September 23, 1958, in Valdosta, Georgia. He attended Parkrose High School in Portland, Oregon, for whom he played basketball.

=== Collegiate career ===
Blume was recruited to Oregon State University by future Naismith Hall of Fame coach Ralph Miller. He was part of a 7 freshman recruiting class which joined 6 sophomores in making the 1977–78 OSU team the youngest in school history. Joining the 6'4" Blume on the 1977–78 OSU team was Rose City backcourt rival Mark Radford, at 6'3" another tall guard who would later spend time in the NBA. While Blume came off the bench during his freshman year, from the 1978–79 through the 1980–81 seasons, Blume and Radford would comprise a potent backcourt combination for OSU, helping take the team to the NCAA tournament during the pair's junior and senior seasons.

The Beavers finished Blume's freshman campaign with a record of 16 wins and 11 losses, with the curly-haired freshman coming off the bench to see action in all but two games. Blume's place was an important one, averaging nearly 16 minutes of game time over the course of the year, during which he scored an average of 6.2 points and garnered better than a steal per game. The season was the first of four in succession for Blume during which he made at least 50% of his shots taken from the floor, finishing the year with a field goal percentage of .521.

OSU showed some improvement during Blume's second year — a season in which he cracked the starting lineup for the opener. Blume's path to the starting five was paved by the decision of previous starter Brian Hilliard not to return to OSU to play his junior season owing to a nagging injury and loss of focus. Blume took the keys to the car and never looked back, finishing the season shooting .500 en route to a scoring average of 13.4 points per game, with his backcourt mate Radford putting up very comparable numbers.

Together with 6'11 center Steve Johnson, another future NBA talent, OSU was tapped for post-season play in the National Invitational Tournament (NIT), bowing out in the first round.

The 1979–80 season was a breakout year for Oregon State men's basketball — with the team winning the Pac-10 title with an overall record of 26–4, topping out at #2 in the national polls, and gaining a regional 2-seed in the 48-team NCAA postseason tournament. The season also proved to be a break-out year for Ray Blume personally. During this first of two extremely successful seasons, Blume logged more than 1100 minutes of action, upping his scoring average to 15.4 points per game as well as his shooting percentage, which finally rested at .564. Blume added averages of 2.2 steals per game and 4.5 assists to his résumé, garnering national attention with 2nd team All-American honors.

Ray Blume's senior campaign, 1980–81, is the year of Ralph Miller's "Orange Express" — a season in which the team won 26 consecutive victories, winning the Pac-10 title with a record of 17–1, and sat first in the polls for nearly two months. To the senior starting core of Blume, Radford, and Johnson were added two more future NBA players, small forward JC-transfer Lester Conner and highly touted Oregon-born freshman power forward Charlie Sitton.

Blume again combined shooting chops with defensive prowess, finishing the year with double-digit scoring on a much deeper team and upping his shooting percentage to a career high .569. He also managed to steal the ball 50 times for the third straight year and averaged 3.6 assists in Ralph Miller's old school "no bounce passes," backdoor-cutting offense. The dream season came to a bitter close, however, with the team dropping its home finale to Alton Lister, Fat Lever, and the potent Arizona State Sun Devils before a shocking first-round exit in the 1981 NCAA Division-I basketball tournament.

A stellar defender as well as a dangerous perimeter shooter in the years before the 3 point basket, Blume amassed 205 steals in his 111 games as a Beaver, an average of better than 1.8 steals per contest. He finished his OSU career with a scoring average of 11.6 points per game. Blume was selected for the OSU Athletics Hall of Fame in 2004 and named to the Pac-12 Basketball Hall of Honor in 2017.

=== Professional career ===
Blume was selected by the Indiana Pacers in the 2nd round (36th pick overall) of the 1981 NBA draft and traded immediately to the Chicago Bulls along with a future 2nd round pick in exchange for Mike Oliver.

Blume played for the Bulls during the 1981–82 season, appearing in 49 games, starting twice. During his brief stint in the association, Blume scored 4.6 points per game during an average of just over 11 minutes of action. Blume was sold by the Bulls to the NBA's San Diego Clippers on October 8, 1982, but he never saw regular-season game action with the team. Blume was waived by the club on October 28, 1982.

After his short NBA career was over, Blume played basketball professionally in Europe.

=== Life after basketball ===
Following his professional basketball career, Blume returned to Portland, Oregon and began a lengthy career in the public sector working for the Multnomah County Roads Department.

== Career statistics ==
Legend
GP	Games played	GS	Games started	MPG	Minutes per game
FG%	Field goal percentage	3P%	3-point field goal percentage	FT%	Free throw percentage
RPG	Rebounds per game	APG	Assists per game	SPG	Steals per game
BPG	Blocks per game	PPG	Points per game	**Bold**	Career high

=== NBA ===
==== Regular season ====
Year	Team	GP	GS	MPG	FG%	3P%	FT%	RPG	APG	SPG	BPG	PPG
1981–82	Chicago	49	2	11.1	.459	.222	.643	.8	1.4	.5	.0	4.6
