= 2010–11 Oregon State Beavers men's basketball team =

American college basketball season

2010–11 Oregon State Beavers men's basketball
- Conference: Pacific-10 Conference
- Record: 11–20 (5–13 Pac-10)
- Head coach: Craig Robinson
- Assistant coaches: Doug Stewart; Nate Pomeday; David Grace
- Home arena: Gill Coliseum

2010–11 Pacific-10 Conference men's basketball standings
	Conf.				Overall
Team	W		L	PCT	W		L	PCT
No. 17 Arizona	14	–	4	.778	30	–	8	.789
UCLA	13	–	5	.722	23	–	11	.676
No. 23 Washington †	11	–	7	.611	24	–	11	.686
USC	10	–	8	.556	19	–	15	.559
California	10	–	8	.556	18	–	15	.545
Washington State	9	–	9	.500	22	–	13	.629
Oregon	7	–	11	.389	21	–	18	.538
Stanford	7	–	11	.389	15	–	16	.484
Oregon State	5	–	13	.278	11	–	20	.355
Arizona State	4	–	14	.222	12	–	19	.387
† Conference tournament winner As of March 30, 2011; Rankings from AP poll

The 2010–11 Oregon State Beavers men's basketball team represented Oregon State University in the 2010–11 college basketball season. Head coach Craig Robinson was in his third year with the team. The Beavers played their home games at Gill Coliseum in Corvallis, Oregon and were a member of the Pacific-10 conference. They finished the season 11–20, 5–13 in Pac-10 play and lost in the quarterfinals of the 2011 Pacific-10 Conference men's basketball tournament to Arizona.

== 2010 recruiting class ==
College recruiting information
Name	Hometown	School	Height	Weight	Commit date
Ahmad Starks; PG	Chicago, Illinois	Whitney Young	5 ft 8 in (1.73 m)	145 lb (66 kg)	Aug 4, 2008
Ahmad Starks; PG	Recruit ratings: Scout: Rivals: (-)				
Devon Collier; PF	Jersey City, New Jersey	St. Anthony	6 ft 7 in (2.01 m)	205 lb (93 kg)	Nov 5, 2009
Devon Collier; PF	Recruit ratings: Scout: Rivals: (-)				
Eric Moreland; PF	Missouri City, Texas	Hightower	6 ft 9 in (2.06 m)	210 lb (95 kg)	May 14, 2010
Eric Moreland; PF	Recruit ratings: Scout: Rivals: (-)				
Chris Brown; C	Mouth of Wilson, Virginia	Oak Hill Academy	6 ft 11 in (2.11 m)	250 lb (110 kg)	May 17, 2010
Chris Brown; C	Recruit ratings: Scout: Rivals: (-)				
Overall recruit ranking: Scout: - Rivals: -
Note: In many cases, Scout, Rivals, 247Sports, On3, and ESPN may conflict in their listings of height and weight.; In these cases, the average was taken. ESPN grades are on a 100-point scale.; Sources: "Oregon State Commit List for 2010". Rivals.; "Men's Basketball Recruiting". Scout.; "ESPN – Oregon State Beavers Basketball Recruiting 2010". ESPN.; "Scout.com Team Recruiting Rankings". Scout.; "2010 Team Ranking". Rivals.

== Roster ==
2010–11 Oregon State Beavers men's basketball team
Players
Coaches

Pos.	#	Name	Height	Weight	Year	Hometown
G	1	Jared Cunningham	6 ft 4 in (1.93 m)	182 lb (83 kg)	So	San Leandro, California
G	3	Ahmad Starks	5 ft 8 in (1.73 m)	153 lb (69 kg)	Fr	Chicago, Illinois
C	4	Chris Brown	6 ft 11 in (2.11 m)	262 lb (119 kg)	Fr	Houston, Texas
F	11	Joe Burton	6 ft 7 in (2.01 m)	280 lb (127 kg)	So	Soboda, California
C	12	Angus Brandt	6 ft 10 in (2.08 m)	237 lb (108 kg)	So	Sydney, Australia
F	13	Rhys Murphy	6 ft 7 in (2.01 m)	195 lb (88 kg)	Fr	Sydney, Australia
F	15	Eric Moreland	6 ft 10 in (2.08 m)	201 lb (91 kg)	Fr	Missouri City, Texas
G	22	Calvin Haynes	6 ft 3 in (1.91 m)	188 lb (85 kg)	Sr	Los Angeles, California
F	24	Omari Johnson	6 ft 9 in (2.06 m)	220 lb (100 kg)	Sr	Los Angeles, California
F	30	Daniel Deane	6 ft 8 in (2.03 m)	246 lb (112 kg)	Sr	Park City, Utah
G	34	Lathen Wallace	6 ft 3 in (1.91 m)	200 lb (91 kg)	Sr	Portland, Oregon
C	41	Daniel Jones	6 ft 11 in (2.11 m)	208 lb (94 kg)	Fr	Orland, California
F	44	Devon Collier	6 ft 7 in (2.01 m)	206 lb (93 kg)	Fr	Bronx, New York
G	55	Roberto Nelson	6 ft 3 in (1.91 m)	188 lb (85 kg)	Fr	Santa Barbara, California

Head coach

- Craig Robinson (Princeton)

Assistant coach(es)

- Doug Stewart (Brown)
- Nate Pomeday (Northwestern)
- David Grace (Park)

Legend

- (C) Team captain
- (S) Suspended
- (I) Ineligible
- (W) Walk-on
- Injured
- Current redshirt

Roster
Last update: 2010-12-15

== Schedule ==
Date time, TV	Rank^{#}	Opponent^{#}	Result	Record	Site (attendance) city, state
Exhibition
11/09/2010*; 7:00 pm		Western Oregon	W 71–43	—	Gill Coliseum (2,379); Corvallis, Oregon
Regular season
11/14/2010*; 1:30 pm		Texas–Arlington	W 71–56	1–0	Gill Coliseum (2,614); Corvallis, Oregon
11/17/2010*; 7:00 pm, FSNNW		at Seattle	L 80–83	1–1	KeyArena (4,526); Seattle, Washington
11/21/2010*; 4:30 pm		Texas Southern	L 60–66	1–2	Gill Coliseum (5,436); Corvallis, Oregon
11/24/2010*; 8:00 pm, FSNNW		Charlotte	W 83–70	2–2	Gill Coliseum (3,683); Corvallis, Oregon
11/27/2010*; 1:00 pm		at Howard	W 84–74	3–2	Burr Gymnasium (1,827); Washington, D.C.
12/01/2010*; 7:00 pm		Utah Valley	L 68–70	3–3	Gill Coliseum (3,514); Corvallis, Oregon
12/04/2010*; 7:00 pm, ESPNU		at Colorado; Big 12/Pac-10 Hardwood Series	L 57–83	3–4	Coors Events Center (6,363); Boulder, Colorado
12/12/2010*; 1:30 pm		Texas–Pan American	W 89–69	4–4	Gill Coliseum (3,607); Corvallis, Oregon
12/15/2010*; 6:00 pm		at Montana	L 66–71	4–5	Dahlberg Arena (4,378); Missoula, Montana
12/18/2010*; 4:30 pm, FSNNW		George Washington	L 79–87	4–6	Gill Coliseum (4,018); Corvallis, Oregon
12/22/2010*; 7:00 pm		UIC	W 74–54	5–6	Gill Coliseum (3,881); Corvallis, Oregon
12/30/2010; 7:30 pm, FSNNW		Arizona State	W 80–58	6–6 (1–0)	Gill Coliseum (4,574); Corvallis, Oregon
01/02/2011; 7:00 pm, FSN		Arizona	W 76–75	7–6 (2–0)	Gill Coliseum (5,218); Corvallis, Oregon
01/06/2011; 7:00 pm		at Washington State	L 70–84	7–7 (2–1)	Beasley Coliseum (5,849); Pullman, Washington
01/08/2011; 3:30 pm, FSNNW		at No. 23 Washington	L 72–103	7–8 (2–2)	Alaska Airlines Arena (9,671); Seattle, Washington
01/13/2011; 5:30 pm, FSNNW		UCLA	L 57–62	7–9 (2–3)	Gill Coliseum (6,857); Corvallis, Oregon
01/15/2011; 7:30 pm, FSNNW		USC	W 80–76	8–9 (3–3)	Gill Coliseum (7,257); Corvallis, Oregon
01/22/2011; 3:00 pm, FSN		Oregon; Civil War	L 59–63	8–10 (3–4)	Gill Coliseum (9,836); Corvallis, Oregon
01/27/2011; 8:00 pm, FSN		at California	L 57–85	8–11 (3–5)	Haas Pavilion (6,996); Berkeley, California
01/29/2011; 7:00 pm, FSNNW		at Stanford	L 56–70	8–12 (3–6)	Maples Pavilion (5,442); Stanford, California
02/03/2011; 7:00 pm, FSNNW		No. 20 Washington	W 68–56	9–12 (4–6)	Gill Coliseum (5,783); Corvallis, Oregon
02/05/2011; 5:00 pm, FSNNW		Washington State	L 55–61	9–13 (4–7)	Gill Coliseum (7,376); Corvallis, Oregon
02/10/2011; 8:00 pm, FSN		at USC	L 56–67	9–14 (4–8)	Galen Center (3,853); Los Angeles, California
02/12/2011; 1:00 pm, FSN		at UCLA	L 61–69	9–15 (4–9)	Pauley Pavilion (8,534); Los Angeles, California
02/19/2011; 1:00 pm, FSN		at Oregon; Civil War	L 63–82	9–16 (4–10)	Matthew Knight Arena (12,369); Eugene, Oregon
02/24/2011; 6:00 pm, FSNNW		Stanford	W 87–80	10–16 (5–10)	Gill Coliseum (4,696); Corvallis, Oregon
02/26/2011; 3:00 pm, FSNW		California	L 76–87	10–17 (5–11)	Gill Coliseum (6,741); Corvallis, Oregon
03/03/2011; 6:00 pm, FSN		at No. 18 Arizona	L 59–70	10–18 (5–12)	McKale Center (14,588); Tucson, Arizona
03/05/2011; 1:00 pm		at Arizona State	L 66–80	10–19 (5–13)	Wells Fargo Arena (5,114); Tempe, Arizona
Pac-10 tournament
03/09/2011; 6:00 pm, FSN	(9)	vs. (8) Stanford; Pac-10 First Round	W 69–67	11–19	Staples Center (7,814); Los Angeles, California
03/10/2011; 2:30 pm, FSN	(9)	vs. (1) No. 16 Arizona; Pac-10 Quarterfinals	L 69–78	11–20	Staples Center (10,782); Los Angeles, California
*Non-conference game. ^{#}Rankings from AP Poll. (#) Tournament seedings in parentheses. All times are in Pacific Time.

== Highlights ==
- The February 3 upset over the Huskies marked the first time the Beavers had beaten a Top 25 ranked team since January 2006. It was also the first time the Beavers had started five players recruited by Robinson in his tenure as head coach.
- March 12, 2011 – Jared Cunningham was named to the Pac-10 All Tournament Team.
