= Lester Conner =

American basketball coach and former player

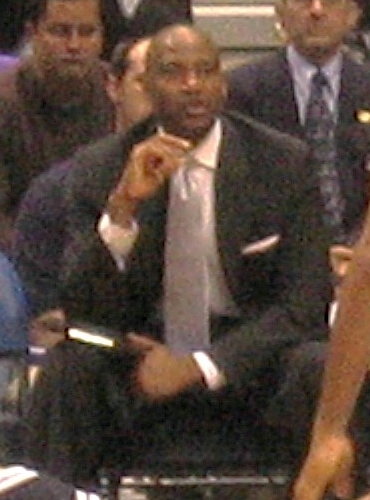
- Conner in 2005

Personal information
- Born: September 17, 1959 (age 67) Memphis, Tennessee, U.S.
- Listed height: 6 ft 4 in (1.93 m)
- Listed weight: 180 lb (82 kg)

Career information
- High school: Fremont (Oakland, California)
- College: Los Medanos (1978–1979); Chabot College (1979–1980); Oregon State (1980–1982)
- NBA draft: 1982: 1st round, 14th overall pick
- Drafted by: Golden State Warriors
- Playing career: 1982–1997
- Position: Shooting guard
- Number: 15, 32, 7, 12
- Coaching career: 1998–2015, 2024

Career history

Playing
- 1982–1986: Golden State Warriors
- 1986–1987: Rapid City Thrillers
- 1987–1988: Houston Rockets
- 1988–1991: New Jersey Nets
- 1991–1992: Milwaukee Bucks
- 1993: Los Angeles Clippers
- 1993–1994: Rapid City Thrillers
- 1994: Indiana Pacers
- 1995: Los Angeles Lakers
- 1996–1997: Florida Beach Dogs

Coaching
- 1998–2004: Boston Celtics (assistant)
- 2004–2005: Philadelphia 76ers (assistant)
- 2005–2007: Milwaukee Bucks (assistant)
- 2007–2010: Indiana Pacers (assistant)
- 2010–2013: Atlanta Hawks (assistant)
- 2013–2015: Denver Nuggets (assistant)
- 2024: Virginia Valley Vipers

Career highlights
- CBA champion (1987); Second-team All-American – AP (1982); Third-team All-American – UPI (1982); Pac-10 Player of the Year (1982); First-team All-Pac-10 (1982)

Career NBA statistics
- Points: 4,337 (6.3 ppg)
- Assists: 2,669 (3.9 apg)
- Steals: 1,085 (1.6 spg)
- Stats at NBA.com
- Stats at Basketball Reference

Lester Allen Conner (born September 17, 1959) is an American professional basketball coach and former player, who played for numerous NBA teams. On the floor at the collegiate level the 6'4" Conner was a "swingman," playing both the shooting guard and small forward positions, earning high collegiate honors as the 1982 Pac-10 Player of the Year.

Conner was the 14th selection in the first round of the 1982 NBA draft, selected by his hometown Golden State Warriors, for whom he played the first four years of his 12-season NBA career. In the NBA Conner was a "combo guard," playing both the shooting guard and point guard positions. His NBA career was interrupted by one year played with the league champion Rapid City Thrillers of the Continental Basketball Association.

Following his retirement at the end of the 1994–95 season, Conner turned his attention to coaching, beginning as an assistant to Boston Celtics head coach Rick Pitino in 1998 and continuing for more than 15 years.

== Biography ==
Conner was born September 17, 1959, in Memphis, Tennessee. He grew up in Oakland, California, where he attended the ethnically diverse Fremont High School. Although he played high school basketball for the Fremont Tigers, he was far from a star at the time, starting sporadically. No elite collegiate basketball programs beat down his door, and Conner found himself relegated to pursuing an alternate path forward in his chosen sport.

== Collegiate career ==
=== Junior College ===
In 1978, Conner enrolled at Los Medanos Junior College in Pittsburg, California, where his game expanded dramatically. Conner achieved star status, averaging 25.2 points per game in leading his team to a 24–7 record. He moved on to Chabot Junior College in Hayward, California, for the 1979–80 season, achieving similar results in becoming the co-recipient of the California Junior College Player of the Year honors. From being a largely unheralded high school player, Conner found himself a blue chip prospect as a transfer player, pursued by some of the leading collegiate programs in America.

=== 1980–81 ===
One chief suitor included Jerry Tarkanian, head coach of the University of Nevada-Las Vegas, whose program Conner found attractive. Another was Oregon State University, a program headed by gruff veteran head coach Ralph Miller, a future member of the Basketball Hall of Fame. Conner requested that Miller travel to see him play in person, a bold request that one writer has likened to "asking the Pope to say grace at Thanksgiving dinner." Nevertheless, Miller acceded to Conner's wishes and ultimately won Conner's commitment to take a scholarship with the program nearly a month after the end of the April signing period.

Conner quickly won a starting role with the team, opening up the 1980–81 season playing small forward next to future NBA players Steve Johnson, Mark Radford, Ray Blume, and Charlie Sitton. The team was regarded from opening day as one of the powers of college basketball, bringing back the nucleus of a team that had finished the previous year with a record of 26–4 as the 5th ranked team in America. Conner would produce for much of the year off the bench as an invaluable sixth man, gaining notice as a highly skilled passer, gritty rebounder, and lock-down defensive specialist.

Seven wins out the gate brought the Beavers a #2 national ranking, which soon became #1 when Oregon State kept winning while the previously top-ranked DePaul Blue Demons fell to Old Dominion, 63–62, on January 10, 1981. The DePaul result was announced in the midst of an OSU annihilation of the Cal Golden Bears, with the home team up 56–28, bringing the crowd of 10,087 to a deafening standing ovation lasting more than a minute.

The 1980–81 Beavers flirted with perfection, going 26–0 before suffering a shocking 20 point home loss to Alton Lister, Fat Lever, and the 24–3 Arizona State Sun Devils to close the year. The season would then end in unmitigated disaster with a crushing early loss to Kansas State, 50–48, in the 1981 NCAA Tournament. Conner would finish the year fourth on the team in scoring, with an average of 7.0 points per game, and pulling down 119 rebounds — second on the Beavers to star 6'11" center Steve Johnson.

=== 1981–82 ===
Conner's senior season, 1981–82, looked like trouble for Oregon State, with both guards and center Steve Johnson leaving for the NBA, along with two rotation players, with those lost needing to be replaced by athletes of clearly lesser talent. Fully 71% of the offense from OSU's previous season was erased by the loss of the departures, along with 53% of the team's rebounds. The arch-rival UCLA Bruins entered the year with a #2 ranking; expectations for OSU to repeat as conference champions were extremely low.

The Beavers had a new tool in the kit, however, with the addition of an acclaimed 6'8" freshman from Benson High School in Portland named A.C. Green, who narrowly chose OSU over coach George Raveling and Washington State University. Together with the maturation and improvement of pesky defensive guard William Brew and angular small forward Danny Evans, and the return of the versatile Charlie Sitton, the Beavers found themselves with a more than capable roster that racked up a Pac-10 conference record of 16–2 en route to a third straight conference title.

Conner played mostly at the 2-guard position during his senior year, while frequently sharing the chore of advancing the ball against pressure. He proved his mettle as a passer, finishing the season as the Pac-10's leader in assists, with an average of 5.1 assists per game. While the over-achieving Beavers again found themselves knocked out of the NCAA Tournament before they were ready, they won games in their first two rounds before running into Patrick Ewing, Sleepy Floyd, and the Georgetown Hoyas and a 24-point drubbing.

Conner would finish the year as the team's scoring leader, with an average of 14.6 points per game, as well as the team's rebounding leader, with 145 boards — topping power forward A.C. Green's total of 141.

During his two years as a Beaver, Conner helped lead the team to a record of 52 wins and 6 losses, a winning percentage of .897.

Conner was voted the 1982 Pac-10 Player of the Year, following his Oregon State teammate Steve Johnson as recipient of the award, and was tapped as a 1982 AP All-American. He was remembered by OSU boss Ralph Miller as one of the top five defensive players he coached during his 38-season career.

== Professional career ==
1982-1986: Conner was drafted in 1982 as the 14th pick overall, by the Golden State Warriors, and played with the Warriors for 4 seasons.

1988: Houston Rockets

1989-1991: New Jersey Nets

1991-1992: Milwaukee Bucks,

1993: Los Angeles Clippers

1994: Indiana Pacers

1995: Los Angeles Lakers. He ended his NBA playing days in 1995.

He earned the nickname "The Molester" for his ball-stealing defensive play.

Conner won a CBA championship with the Rapid City Thrillers in 1987.

== NBA career statistics ==
Legend
GP	Games played	GS	Games started	MPG	Minutes per game
FG%	Field goal percentage	3P%	3-point field goal percentage	FT%	Free throw percentage
RPG	Rebounds per game	APG	Assists per game	SPG	Steals per game
BPG	Blocks per game	PPG	Points per game	**Bold**	Career high

=== Regular season ===
Year	Team	GP	GS	MPG	FG%	3P%	FT%	RPG	APG	SPG	BPG	PPG
1982–83	Golden State	75	10	18.9	.479	.000	.699	2.9	3.4	1.5	0.1	4.9
1983–84	Golden State	**82**	**82**	**31.4**	.493	.167	.718	3.7	4.9	2.0	0.1	**11.1**
1984–85	Golden State	79	49	28.6	.451	.200	.750	3.1	4.7	2.0	**0.2**	8.1
1985–86	Golden State	36	0	11.5	.375	.286	.741	1.7	1.2	0.7	0.0	4.0
1987–88	Houston	52	3	7.7	.463	.000	.780	0.7	1.1	0.7	0.0	2.5
1988–89	New Jersey	**82**	63	30.9	.457	**.351**	.788	**4.3**	**7.4**	**2.2**	0.1	10.3
1989–90	New Jersey	**82**	61	28.7	.414	.154	.804	3.2	4.7	2.1	0.1	7.9
1990–91	New Jersey	35	2	14.0	**.523**	.000	.690	1.6	1.7	1.1	0.0	4.1
1990–91	Milwaukee	39	2	13.3	.396	.000	.750	1.4	2.7	1.2	0.0	2.9
1991–92	Milwaukee	81	9	17.5	.431	.000	.704	2.3	3.6	1.2	0.1	3.5
1992–93	Los Angeles	31	0	13.6	.452	.000	.947	1.6	2.1	1.1	0.1	2.4
1993–94	Indiana	11	0	15.4	.368	.000	.500	2.2	2.8	1.3	0.1	2.8
1994–95	Los Angeles	2	0	2.5	.000	.000	**1.000**	0.0	0.0	0.5	0.0	1.0
Career		687	281	21.8	.453	.202	.753	2.7	3.9	1.6	0.1	6.3

=== Playoffs ===
Year	Team	GP	GS	MPG	FG%	3P%	FT%	RPG	APG	SPG	BPG	PPG
1987–88	Houston	1	0	1.0	.000	.000	**1.000**	1.0	1.0	**1.0**	0.0	2.0
1990–91	Milwaukee	1	0	7.0	**1.000**	.000	.000	1.0	**2.0**	0.0	0.0	2.0
1992–93	Los Angeles	5	0	**12.8**	.750	**1.000**	**1.000**	**1.4**	**2.0**	0.6	**0.2**	**4.2**
1993–94	Indiana	**6**	0	3.7	.400	.000	**1.000**	0.7	0.0	0.2	0.0	1.0
Career		13	0	7.2	.667	1.000	.857	1.0	1.0	0.4	0.1	2.4

== Coaching career ==
Conner began his NBA coaching career in 1998 as an assistant to head coach Rick Pitino of the Boston Celtics. Conner credits Pitino with teaching him to project his voice from the bench, shouting instructions that cut through the din of an NBA arena.

He also was twice the assistant coach in Milwaukee for head coach Terry Stotts, leaving after Stotts was fired following the 2006–2007 season.

Conner is considered a protege of former Indiana Pacers head coach Jim O'Brien and has worked under O'Brien on three separate occasions. The first was with the Boston Celtics from 2001 to 2004. The second was as the associate head coach for the Philadelphia 76ers in the 2004–05 season. In June, 2007, Conner moved to Indiana, to once again work for O'Brien and the Pacers.

On Feb. 2, 2010, taking over for one game for an absent O'Brien, Lester Conner instituted a few strategic changes such as moving Roy Hibbert closer to the basket and emphasizing an attacking, uptempo style preferred by the players. The Pacers scored what turned out to be a season-high 130 points in a 15-point victory amid their 32–50 season.

In 2010, Conner joined Larry Drew as his top assistant at the Atlanta Hawks, leaving the team following Drew's termination at the end of the 2012–13 NBA Season. Conner joined the Denver Nuggets for the 2013–14 season as an assistant coach.

Conner has expressed an interest in returning to his alma mater, Oregon State University, as a head coach, but was informed in 2014 by Beaver Athletic Director Bob De Carolis of the university's unwillingness to make the job available to him due to Conner's lack of a college degree. Conner expressed lament at the university's refusal to consider him for what he called "the only university job I want" owing to lack of academic qualification. "I understand the importance of having the degree," Conner told an interviewer from the Portland Oregonian in May 2014. "But at the same time, that doesn't define who I am or what I am as a coach and as a person."

Conner came out of his coaching retirement to serve as head coach for the Virginia Valley Vipers of The Basketball League during the 2024 season.
