= Rolando Blackman =

Panamanian-American basketball player

Personal information
- Born: February 26, 1959 (age 67) Panama City, Panama
- Listed height: 6 ft 6 in (1.98 m)
- Listed weight: 190 lb (86 kg)

Career information
- High school: William E. Grady (Brooklyn, New York)
- College: Kansas State (1977–1981)
- NBA draft: 1981: 1st round, 9th overall pick
- Drafted by: Dallas Mavericks
- Playing career: 1981–1997
- Position: Shooting guard
- Number: 22, 20

Career history
- 1981–1992: Dallas Mavericks
- 1992–1994: New York Knicks
- 1994–1995: AEK Athens
- 1995–1996: Olimpia Milano
- 1996–1997: CSP Limoges

Career highlights
- 4× NBA All-Star (1985–1987, 1990); Italian League champion (1996); Italian Cup winner (1996); Italian Cup MVP (1996); Greek League All-Star (1994 II); No. 22 retired by Dallas Mavericks; Third-team All-American – NABC (1981); Third-team All-American – AP (1980); Big Eight Player of the Year (1980); 3× First-team All-Big Eight (1979–1981); No. 25 jersey retired by Kansas State Wildcats

Career NBA statistics
- Points: 17,623 (18.0 ppg)
- Rebounds: 3,278 (3.3 rpg)
- Assists: 2,981 (3.0 apg)
- Stats at NBA.com
- Stats at Basketball Reference
- Collegiate Basketball Hall of Fame

Rolando Antonio Blackman (born February 26, 1959) is a Panamanian-American former professional basketball player who spent 13 seasons in the National Basketball Association (NBA), most of it with the Dallas Mavericks. He was a four-time NBA All-Star, and he holds the Mavericks' franchise single-game record for free throws made (22).

Blackman was born in Panama City, Panama, and raised in Brooklyn, New York, from the age of eight.

== Playing career ==
=== College basketball ===
After being raised in Brooklyn, Blackman attended Kansas State University where he played basketball under coach Jack Hartman. At Kansas State, Blackman had a number of noteworthy achievements:

- In 1980, he was named the Big Eight Conference Player of the Year and All-American.
- He was a three-time unanimous All-Big Eight selection.
- He was three times named the Big Eight Defensive Player of the Year.
- He scored 1,844 career points, the second-highest total in Kansas State history.
- He had a career .517 Field Goal Percentage and a .717 Free Throw Percentage.

Prior to his senior season, Blackman also was selected as a starter for the 1980 Summer Olympics basketball team, but did not participate in the Olympics because of the U.S. Olympic boycott. He did however receive one of 461 Congressional Gold Medals created especially for the spurned athletes.

In his senior year Blackman led Kansas State into the West Regional of the NCAA tournament as the #8 seed. They defeated #9 seed University of San Francisco in the first round. Then KSU pulled an iconic upset of #1 seed Oregon State, 50–48, in the second round, punctuated by Blackman's game-winning jumper with three seconds left in the game. Next up was #4 seed Illinois, whom they defeated 57–52 in the semi before losing to #2 seed North Carolina 82–68 in the West Regional final.

In 1996, after the Big Eight Conference expanded to the Big 12, Blackman was named to the AP all-time All-Big Eight basketball team. Blackman's number 25 jersey was retired by Kansas State February 17, 2007 in a ceremony at halftime during a game against Iowa State. In 2015, he was inducted into National Collegiate Basketball Hall of Fame.

== Professional career ==
=== Dallas Mavericks (1981–1992) ===
Rolando Blackman was drafted by the Mavericks in the first round (9th overall) of the 1981 NBA draft. He became the first Panamanian-born player in the NBA. Blackman had an immediate impact on the team, averaging 13.3 PPG in his rookie season. He was given a good amount of minutes in his career, getting around 24 minutes per game in his rookie campaign. He played well but the Mavericks weren't good until the 1983–1984 season. That was also Blackman's best statistical season as he averaged a career high 22.4 PPG and lead the franchise to its first ever playoff appearance. The Mavericks managed to beat the Seattle SuperSonics and reach the second round before ultimately losing to the Los Angeles Lakers. On February 17, 1986, Blackman set the Mavericks single-game record for free throws made and attempted in a 22–23 performance. Despite putting up amazing stats, Blackman missed the all star game that year, although he did make it the following year. He would go on to be named an NBA All-Star four times in his career. At the 1987 All-Star Game, Blackman tied the game at the end of regulation with two free throws. The West team would go on to win in overtime. As for the Mavericks, they played well and even had a magical season in 1987–1988 where they managed to reach the Western Conference Finals. This appearance happened to be the franchise's first Conference Finals appearance in its history. The Mavericks made it far but fell to the Los Angeles Lakers in 7 games. After this series the Mavericks began to decline and wouldn't achieve the same amount of success until much later on in the Dirk Nowitzki era. Blackman continued to play well and averaged around 19 PPG for the next few seasons, however the Mavericks fell off in the standings. By the 1991–1992 season, Blackman was 32 years old and the Mavericks entered a stage of rebuilding. By the 1992 off-season Blackman's time with the team was finished. Blackman made 6,487 field goals with the Mavericks and scored 16,643 points, which was a franchise record for 18 years – until broken by Dirk Nowitzki on March 8, 2008. In his 865 games with the Mavericks, Blackman never fouled out of a game.

=== New York Knicks (1992–1994) ===
On June 24, 1992, Blackman was traded to the New York Knicks for a 1995 first-round pick (which became Loren Meyer). Blackman spent his final two seasons in the NBA with the New York Knicks. In his last season in New York, he was reunited with former Dallas teammate Derek Harper. The team made it to the NBA Finals where they lost to the Houston Rockets in seven games. One of Blackman's most notable games as a Knick was when he hit the game winning shot in Game 4 of the 1993 Eastern Conference Semi-finals against the Charlotte Hornets, hitting a jump shot with five seconds left in the game that put the Knicks up by two. Blackman still played well in the twilight years of his career, but his age was finally getting to him and his time in the NBA was over. On July 6, 1994, the Knicks waived Blackman.

=== Retirement from the NBA ===
Shortly after being released, he retired from the league. Following the 1993–94 season, he had career totals of 17,623 points, 3,278 rebounds and 2,981 assists. Blackman was NBA's all-time scoring leader among Hispanic/Latin players (born in Iberian, Latin American & Spanish-speaking countries) until March 6, 2015, when Pau Gasol overtook him. Blackman's number 22 jersey was retired by the Mavericks on March 11, 2000.

=== Europe ===
Blackman signed with the Greek League team AEK Athens BC in the middle of the 1994–95 season. Coached by Vlade Đurović, they finished the season in a disappointing eight place.

Over the summer of 1995, Blackman moved to Olimpia Milano, where he was brought in by head coach Bogdan Tanjević. Playing in the Italian League on a team including Dejan Bodiroga, Gregor Fučka, Nando Gentile, and Alessandro De Pol, Blackman, who turned 37 during the season, helped them win both the Italian League title and the Italian Basketball Cup by averaging 15.3 points per game. Blackman was named MVP of the Italian Cup series. Olimpia also reached the Korać Cup final, losing to Efes Pilsen Istanbul in the home-and-away series.

Blackman transferred to Limoges CSP in the summer of 1996, essentially brought along by coach Tanjević who earlier signed to be the club's new head coach.

== Post-playing career ==
In 2000, Blackman was tapped to be the defensive coordinator for the Mavericks under coach Don Nelson. The next year, he served as an assistant coach for the German National team and helped lead them to a bronze medal at the 2002 World Basketball Championships in Indianapolis. During the 2004–05 season, Blackman was hired as one of the Mavericks television analysts, along with Matt Pinto and Bob Ortegel. For the 2005–06 season, Blackman returned to the Mavericks' bench, serving his first season as a full-fledged assistant coach. In July 2006 he was promoted to the position of Director of Player Development.

In August 2010, Blackman was hired as an assistant coach for the Turkey national basketball team by head coach Bogdan Tanjević, in advance of the 2010 FIBA World Championship tournament. Blackman stated that he took the job specifically to work again with Tanjević, who had been his coach in Milan.

During the 2006 NBA Finals, Blackman's former coach with the New York Knicks, Pat Riley, admitted, publicly for the first time, that sitting Rolando Blackman in favor of John Starks during game 7 of the 1994 NBA Finals was the biggest coaching mistake in his career, and that he has never forgiven himself for it.

Blackman was the representative for the Mavericks at the 2025 NBA draft lottery held at Chicago, where the team landed the rights to draft the #1 overall pick after winning a coin flip tiebreaker over the Chicago Bulls. With 1.8% odds, Dallas was the fourth-largest underdog to win the annual drawing since it was instituted in 1985.

== Personal life ==
He has four children and resides in Dallas, Texas.

Blackman is on the board of directors of the Assist Youth Foundation. The foundation's goal is to advance opportunities for underprivileged kids in the Dallas–Fort Worth metroplex and across the globe.

Blackman is a member of Kappa Alpha Psi fraternity. Blackman continues to contribute to his chapter, Beta Psi, as well as the Kansas State University community.

== NBA career statistics ==
Legend
GP	Games played	GS	Games started	MPG	Minutes per game
FG%	Field goal percentage	3P%	3-point field goal percentage	FT%	Free throw percentage
RPG	Rebounds per game	APG	Assists per game	SPG	Steals per game
BPG	Blocks per game	PPG	Points per game	**Bold**	Career high

=== Regular season ===
Year	Team	GP	GS	MPG	FG%	3P%	FT%	RPG	APG	SPG	BPG	PPG
1981–82	Dallas	**82**	16	24.1	.513	.250	.768	3.1	1.3	0.6	0.4	13.3
1982–83	Dallas	75	62	31.3	.492	.200	.780	3.9	2.5	0.5	0.4	17.7
1983–84	Dallas	81	**81**	37.3	**.546**	.091	.812	**4.6**	3.6	0.7	**0.5**	**22.4**
1984–85	Dallas	81	80	35.0	.508	.300	.828	3.7	3.6	0.8	0.2	19.7
1985–86	Dallas	**82**	**81**	34.0	.514	.138	.836	3.5	3.3	**1.0**	0.3	21.5
1986–87	Dallas	80	80	34.5	.495	.333	.884	3.5	3.3	0.8	0.3	21.0
1987–88	Dallas	71	69	36.3	.473	.000	.873	3.5	3.7	0.9	0.3	18.7
1988–89	Dallas	78	78	**37.8**	.476	.353	.854	3.5	3.7	0.8	0.3	19.7
1989–90	Dallas	80	80	36.7	.498	.302	.844	3.5	3.6	**1.0**	0.3	19.4
1990–91	Dallas	80	80	37.1	.482	.351	.865	3.2	**3.8**	0.9	0.2	19.9
1991–92	Dallas	75	74	33.7	.461	.385	.898	3.2	2.7	0.7	0.3	18.3
1992–93	New York	60	33	23.9	.443	**.425**	.789	1.7	2.6	0.4	0.2	9.7
1993–94	New York	55	1	17.6	.436	.357	**.906**	1.7	1.4	0.5	0.1	7.3
Career		980	815	32.7	.493	.343	.840	3.3	3.0	0.7	0.3	18.0
All-Star		4	0	22.0	.592	–	.813	3.3	3.3	1.3	0.5	17.8

=== Playoffs ===
Year	Team	GP	GS	MPG	FG%	3P%	FT%	RPG	APG	SPG	BPG	PPG
1984	Dallas	10	–	39.7	**.531**	–	.841	4.1	4.0	0.6	0.4	23.9
1985	Dallas	4	4	**42.3**	.511	**.500**	.947	**6.5**	**4.8**	0.5	0.5	**32.8**
1986	Dallas	10	10	37.1	.497	.000	.792	3.5	3.2	0.8	0.1	20.8
1987	Dallas	4	4	38.3	.493	.000	.917	3.5	4.3	0.5	0.0	23.5
1988	Dallas	**17**	**17**	39.5	.483	.000	.887	3.2	4.5	0.9	0.2	18.1
1990	Dallas	3	3	**42.3**	.444	.400	**1.000**	3.0	4.3	**2.0**	**0.7**	20.0
1993	New York	15	0	14.3	.344	.267	.833	1.1	1.1	0.2	0.1	4.2
1994	New York	6	0	5.7	.273	**.500**	–	0.5	0.5	0.0	0.0	1.3
Career		69	38	31.0	.484	.290	.869	2.9	3.1	0.6	0.2	16.1
