= Eric Moreland =

American basketball player (born 1991)

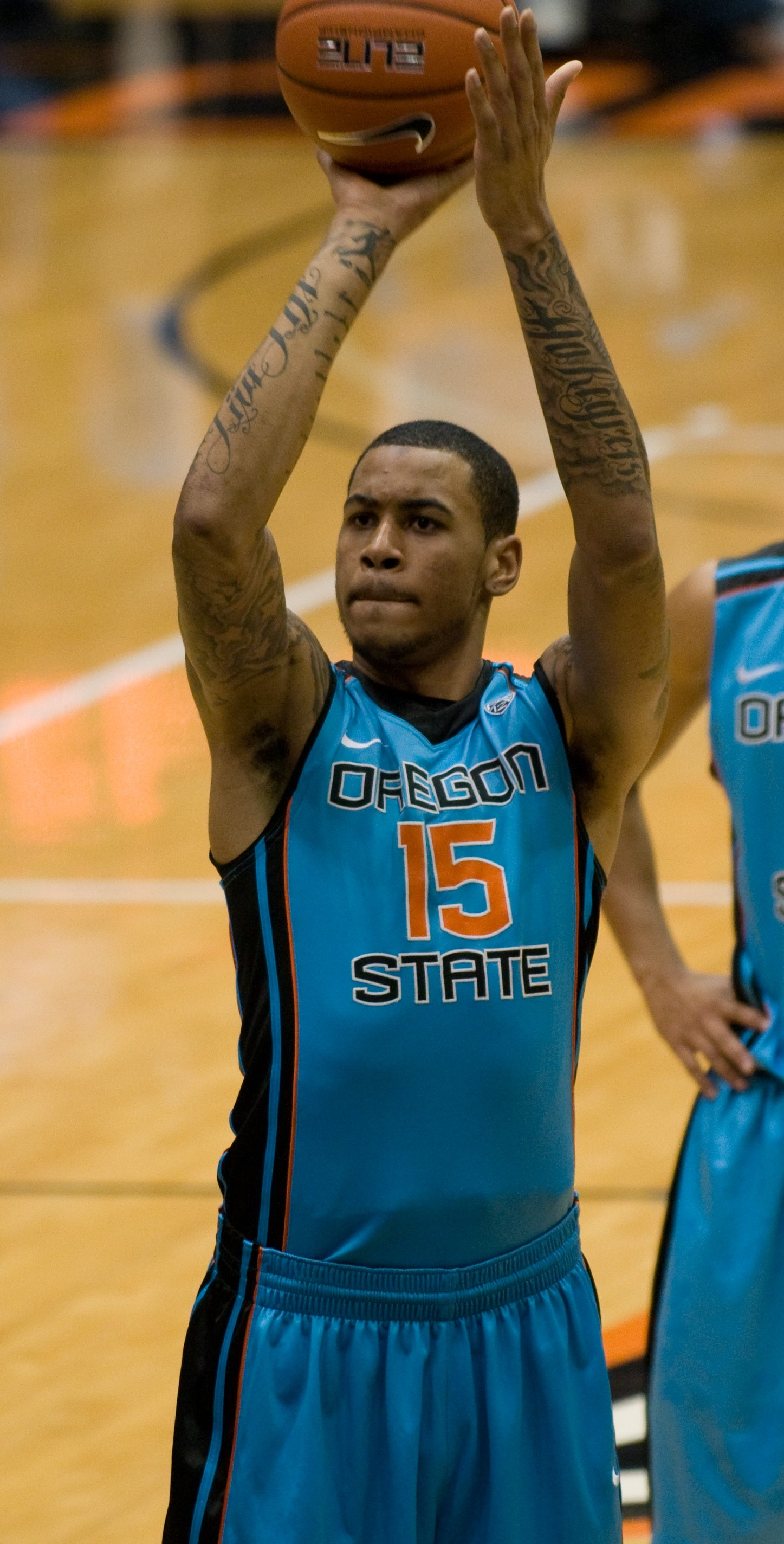
- Moreland at Oregon State shooting a free-throw

Free agent
- Position: Power forward / center

Personal information
- Born: December 24, 1991 (age 34) Houston, Texas, U.S.
- Listed height: 6 ft 11 in (2.11 m)
- Listed weight: 240 lb (109 kg)

Career information
- High school: Hightower (Missouri City, Texas); Ocean Academy (Bayville, New Jersey)
- College: Oregon State (2010–2014)
- NBA draft: 2014: undrafted
- Playing career: 2014–present

Career history
- 2014–2016: Sacramento Kings
- 2014–2016: →Reno Bighorns
- 2016–2017: Canton Charge
- 2017–2018: Detroit Pistons
- 2018–2019: Phoenix Suns
- 2019: Toronto Raptors
- 2019–2021: Shanxi Loongs
- 2021–2024: Liaoning Flying Leopards
- 2024–2025: Guangdong Southern Tigers
- 2025–2026: Liaoning Flying Leopards

Career highlights
- NBA champion (2019); 3× CBA champion (2022, 2023, 2024); CBA rebounding champion (2020); All-NBA D-League Third Team (2017); NBA D-League All-Defensive Team (2017); NBA D-League All-Star (2017)
- Stats at NBA.com
- Stats at Basketball Reference

Eric Andrew Moreland (born December 24, 1991) is an American professional basketball player, who most recently played for the Liaoning Flying Leopards of the Chinese Basketball Association (CBA). He played college basketball for the Oregon State Beavers.

== High school career ==
Following his graduation from Hightower High School in January 2010, Moreland enrolled at Ocean Academy in Bayville, New Jersey for one semester where he averaged 15.5 points and 2.6 blocks per game.

== College career ==
Although originally being recruited by Oregon State, Moreland signed with UTEP in January 2010 upon his graduation from Hightower High. However, following the release of UTEP's head coach Tony Barbee in March 2010, Moreland was released from his scholarship and signed with Oregon State in May 2010. In August 2010, the NCAA cleared him to play immediately with four years of eligibility.

Moreland played four games in 2010–11 before suffering a season-ending left shoulder injury against Colorado on December 4, 2010, that required surgery. On August 4, 2011, he was granted medical hardship, allowing him to retain four years of college eligibility.

In his redshirted freshman season in 2011–12, Moreland played in all 36 games and started 17. He led the Pac-12 in blocked shots, the first Oregon State player to lead the conference in that category since Nick DeWitz in 2005–06. In addition, he broke the Oregon State single-season record with 69 blocked shots that was held by Scott Haskin (68 in 1991–92) and shattered the Oregon State freshman blocked shots record that was set the season before by Devon Collier (23). In 36 games, he averaged 5.2 points, 6.8 rebounds, and 1.9 blocks in 20.5 minutes per game.

In his sophomore season, Moreland earned Pac-12 All-Defensive Honorable Mention honors. He was also named the Pac-12 Player of the Week on December 24, 2012, after posting two double-doubles and averaging 17.0 points and 11.5 rebounds in wins over Howard and San Diego. In 29 games (22 starts), he averaged 9.4 points, 10.6 rebounds, 1.6 assists, and 2.5 blocks in 30.7 minutes per game.

In his junior season, Moreland played just 20 games after he was suspended for the first 12 games for a violation of team rules. He went on to earn Pac-12 All-Defensive Honorable Mention honors for the second straight year after he became just the third player in Oregon State history to average double-figure rebounds in multiple seasons. In 20 games (19 starts), he averaged 8.9 points, 10.3 rebounds, 1.4 assists, and 2.0 blocks in 29.4 minutes per game.

On April 12, 2014, Moreland declared for the NBA draft, foregoing his final year of college eligibility. He finished his Oregon State career as the all-time leader in blocked shots (184) and blocked shots average (2.07), and fifth all-time in rebounds (762) and sixth in rebounding average (8.6). He graduated in March 2014 with a degree in Human Development and Family Science.

== Professional career ==
=== Sacramento Kings (2014–2016) ===
After going undrafted in the 2014 NBA draft, Moreland joined the Sacramento Kings for the 2014 NBA Summer League. On July 30, 2014, he signed with the Kings and went on to receive multiple assignments to the Reno Bighorns of the NBA Development League before being ruled out for the rest of the 2014–15 season on January 1, 2015, due to a labral tear in his left shoulder. He recovered in time to participate in the 2015 NBA Summer League, where he averaged 6.4 points and 8.0 rebounds in five games. On July 29, 2015, Moreland was waived by the Kings, only to be re-signed by the team for training camp on September 9. On December 16, 2015, he was ruled out indefinitely after sustaining a fracture of the fifth metatarsal in his left foot during practice earlier that day. Five days later, he was ruled out for eight weeks after undergoing successful surgery on his left foot. On March 19, 2016, he was assigned to the Reno Bighorns. He was later recalled by the Kings on April 1.

=== Canton Charge (2016–2017) ===
On September 26, 2016, Moreland signed with the Cleveland Cavaliers. After being waived by the Cavaliers on October 3, 2016, he was acquired by the Canton Charge of the NBA Development League on November 1, 2016. On February 6, 2017, he was named in the Eastern Conference All-Star team for the 2017 NBA D-League All-Star Game. At the season's end, he was named to the All-NBA D-League Third Team and NBA D-League All-Defensive Team.

=== Detroit Pistons (2017–2018) ===
On July 6, 2017, Moreland signed with the Detroit Pistons. On January 6, 2018, in a 108–101 win over the Houston Rockets, Moreland replaced the injured Andre Drummond at center for the first start of his career and set career highs with eight points, four assists and 36 minutes. In the Pistons' season finale on April 11, 2018, Moreland had career highs with 16 points, 17 rebounds, four blocks and four steals in 41 minutes in a 119–87 win over the Chicago Bulls.

On July 8, 2018, Moreland was waived by the Pistons. On September 21, 2018, Moreland signed with the Toronto Raptors. After appearing in three preseason games, Moreland was waived on October 12. After being waived by the Raptors, Moreland participated as a member of Team USA for the Americas' 2019 FIBA Basketball World Cup qualification rounds on November 29 and December 3, 2018, leading the team in rebounds in the second game he played there.

=== Phoenix Suns (2018–2019) ===
On December 10, 2018, Moreland signed with the Phoenix Suns, but was waived on January 3, 2019. He played only one game with Phoenix on December 31, 2018, against the Golden State Warriors.

=== Toronto Raptors (2019) ===
On March 14, 2019, Toronto Raptors announced that they had signed Moreland to a 10-day contract. Moreland later played with the Raptors the same day. On March 23, 2019, Moreland's 10-day contract with the Raptors was not renewed, but on April 9, 2019, the Raptors signed Moreland for the remainder of the season. Moreland won an NBA Championship with the Raptors when they defeated the two-time defending champion Golden State Warriors in 6 games during the 2019 NBA Finals.

=== Shanxi Loongs (2019–2021) ===
On October 21, 2019, Moreland was reported to have signed with the Shanxi Loongs. Moreland was activated on November 11 and made his debut on next day, contributing eight points, eleven rebounds and three assists in a 106–87 win over the Shanghai Sharks.

He is on the Atlanta Hawks roster for the 2021 NBA summer league.

=== Liaoning Flying Leopards (2021–2024) ===
On November 27, 2021, he has signed with Liaoning Flying Leopards of the Chinese Basketball Association (CBA).

On April 26, 2022, he won the CBA title with Liaoning Flying Leopards, and became the third basketball player, after Sun Yue and Mengke Bateer, to win both NBA and CBA titles.

=== Guangdong Southern Tigers (2024–2025) ===
On October 26, 2024, Moreland joined Guangdong Southern Tigers of the Chinese Basketball Association (CBA).

=== Liaoning Flying Leopards (2025–present) ===
On July 28, 2025, Moreland returned to Liaoning Flying Leopards.

== Career statistics ==
Legend
GP	Games played	GS	Games started	MPG	Minutes per game
FG%	Field goal percentage	3P%	3-point field goal percentage	FT%	Free throw percentage
RPG	Rebounds per game	APG	Assists per game	SPG	Steals per game
BPG	Blocks per game	PPG	Points per game	**Bold**	Career high
†	Won an NBA championship

=== NBA ===
==== Regular season ====
Year	Team	GP	GS	MPG	FG%	3P%	FT%	RPG	APG	SPG	BPG	PPG
2014–15	Sacramento	3	0	.7	**1.000**	-	-	.3	.0	.0	.0	.7
2015–16	Sacramento	8	0	6.0	.500	-	**.500**	1.4	.1	.0	.5	1.0
2017–18	Detroit	**67**	**3**	**12.0**	.541	-	.379	4.1	**1.2**	**.5**	**.8**	**2.1**
2018–19	Phoenix	1	0	5.0	.000	-	-	3.0	.0	.0	.0	.0
2018–19†	Toronto	4	0	9.5	.429	**1.000**	-	**4.3**	1.0	.3	.3	1.8
Career		83	3	10.8	.537	1.000	.394	3.7	1.0	.4	.7	1.9

==== Playoffs ====
Year	Team	GP	GS	MPG	FG%	3P%	FT%	RPG	APG	SPG	BPG	PPG
2019†	Toronto	8	0	3.5	.500	-	.500	1.6	.4	.0	.0	.3
Career		8	0	3.5	.500	-	.500	1.6	.4	.0	.0	.3
