= Seth Tarver =

American basketball player (born 1988)

Personal information
- Born: July 1, 1988 (age 38) Santa Maria, California, U.S.
- Listed height: 6 ft 5 in (1.96 m)
- Listed weight: 215 lb (98 kg)

Career information
- High school: Jesuit (Beaverton, Oregon)
- College: Oregon State (2006–2010)
- NBA draft: 2010: undrafted
- Playing career: 2010–2017
- Position: Shooting guard / small forward

Career history
- 2010: Portland Showtime
- 2010–2013: Idaho Stampede
- 2013: Sioux Falls Skyforce
- 2013–2014: Rizing Fukuoka
- 2014–2015: Osaka Evessa
- 2015–2016: Saitama Broncos
- 2016–2017: Passlab Yamagata Wyverns

Career highlights
- Pac-10 Defensive Player of the Year (2010)

Seth A. Tarver (born July 1, 1988) is an American former professional basketball player who last played for the Passlab Yamagata Wyverns of the B.League. Tarver played for the Oregon State Beavers in college and graduated in 2010 with a degree in business. His brother, Josh Tarver, also played with him all four years at Oregon State. His father is former NFL running-back John Tarver.

== Amateur career ==
Tarver graduated from Jesuit High School in 2006. Coming out of high school he was widely considered as Oregon's best senior basketball player. As a senior Tarver was named Metro League Player of the Year and to the all-state first team. Tarver lead Jesuit to the 4A Oregon State Championship his junior year. He also ran track and field in high school competing in the 4 × 100 and 4 × 400 relays.

Tarver missed most of his freshman year at Oregon State with a minor case of plantar fasciitis. In his sophomore year Tarver started a team high 27 games and lead the Beavers in minutes per game. Tarver's junior season he helped lead Oregon State to the 2009 CBI Title and was named to the honorable mention Pac-10 all-defensive team. Tarver's senior season at Oregon State was his best season. He won the 2010 Pac-10 Defensive Player of the Year at the top of Oregon State's 1–3–1 defense. Tarver was the first Oregon State player to lead the Pac-10 in steals since Gary Payton in 1990.

== Professional career ==
After his senior season at Oregon State Tarver entered the 2010 NBA draft. However, he went undrafted. He would later receive an invite to the Portland Trail Blazers pre-season team. Tarver played the 2010 NBA pre-season with the Blazers before being signed to the Idaho Stampede, a Blazers D-League affiliate. In July 2011 he signed a one-year deal with EnBW Ludwigsburg in Germany. He left the club before playing a game for them. Tarver returned to the Stampede for the 2011–12 season and remained on the roster until he was traded to the Sioux Falls Skyforce in February 2013. In 2013 Tarver signed with Rizing Fukuoka and began his basketball career in Japan.
