= Jared Cunningham =

American basketball player (born 1991)

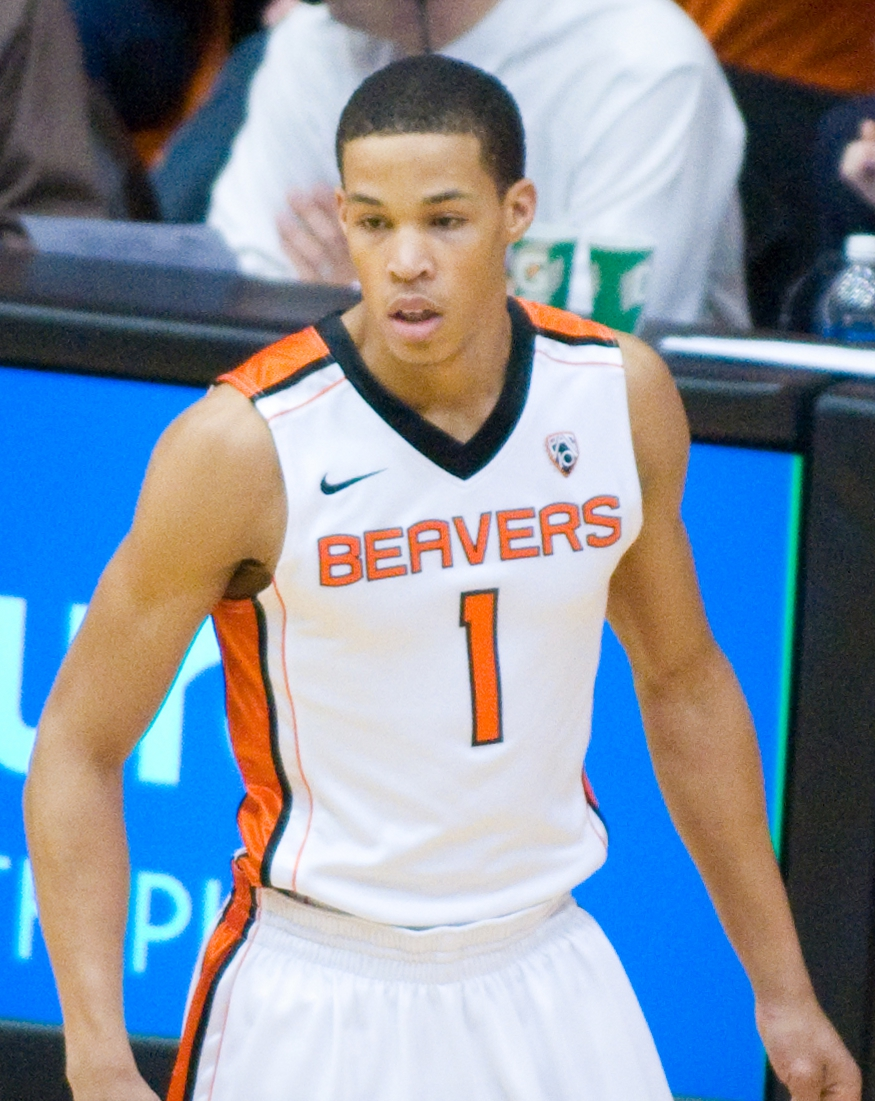
- Cunningham with the Oregon State Beavers in 2010

Free agent
- Position: Shooting guard

Personal information
- Born: May 22, 1991 (age 35) Oakland, California, U.S.
- Listed height: 6 ft 5 in (1.96 m)
- Listed weight: 187 lb (85 kg)

Career information
- High school: San Leandro (San Leandro, California)
- College: Oregon State (2009–2012)
- NBA draft: 2012: 1st round, 24th overall pick
- Drafted by: Cleveland Cavaliers
- Playing career: 2012–present

Career history
- 2012–2013: Dallas Mavericks
- 2012–2013: →Texas Legends
- 2013–2014: Atlanta Hawks
- 2013–2014: →Bakersfield Jam
- 2014: Sacramento Kings
- 2014–2015: Los Angeles Clippers
- 2015: Delaware 87ers
- 2015: Idaho Stampede
- 2015–2016: Cleveland Cavaliers
- 2016: Idaho Stampede
- 2016: Milwaukee Bucks
- 2016–2017: Jiangsu Monkey King
- 2017–2018: Bayern Munich
- 2018–2019: Brescia Leonessa
- 2019–2020: Santa Cruz Warriors
- 2020: Shanghai Sharks
- 2021: Bnei Herzliya
- 2022–2023: Pieno žvaigždės Pasvalys
- 2023–2024: Vojvodina
- 2024–2025: Astros de Jalisco
- 2025: Al Shurtah
- 2025–2026: Héroes de Falcón

Career highlights
- BBL All-Star (2018); First-team All-Pac-12 (2012); Second-team All-Pac-12 (2011)
- Stats at NBA.com
- Stats at Basketball Reference

Jared Armon Cunningham (born May 22, 1991) is an American professional basketball player. He played college basketball for Oregon State, where he was an All-Pac-12 first team selection before being selected with the 24th overall pick in the 2012 NBA draft by the Cleveland Cavaliers.

== High school career ==
In his junior season at San Leandro High School, Cunningham averaged 17.8 points, 4.5 rebounds and 3.3 assists per game. As a senior, He averaged 20.4 points, 6.3 rebounds and 2.6 assists per game. He earned academic All-America honors his senior year.

Considered a four-star recruit by Rivals.com, Cunningham was listed as the No. 14 point guard and the No. 76 player in the nation in 2009.

== College career ==
=== Freshman season ===
In Cunningham's freshman season at Oregon State, he averaged 6.2 points, 2.0 rebounds, and 0.9 assists per game. In a first-round game against Boston University in the 2010 College Basketball Invitational, he recorded a then career-high of 21 points.

=== Sophomore season ===
In his sophomore season, Cunningham averaged 14.2 points, 3.1 rebounds, 2.1 assists and 2.83 steals per game. He was first in the Pac-10 in steals and was also fifth in the nation. He was named to the All-Pac-10 Second Team and the Pac-10 All-Defensive-Team. He was also named to the Pac-10 All-Tournament Team after averaging 23.5 points per game in the 2011 Pacific-10 Conference men's basketball tournament.

=== Junior season ===
In his junior season, he averaged 17.9 points, 3.8 rebounds, 2.8 assists and 2.53 steals per game. He led the Pac-12 in steals per game for the second consecutive season, and also finished ninth nationally. Cunningham was also named to the All-Pac-12 First Team and the Pac-12 All-Defensive Team. Additionally, he was named to the Pac-12 All-Tournament team for the second consecutive season. On April 9, 2012, Jared declared for the 2012 NBA draft.

== Professional career ==
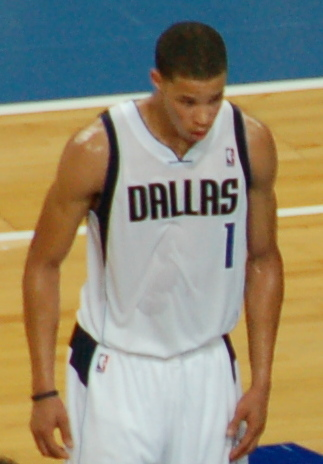
Cunningham with the Dallas Mavericks in 2012

Cunningham was selected with the 24th overall pick in the 2012 NBA draft by the Cleveland Cavaliers. His draft rights were then traded with Jae Crowder and Bernard James to the Dallas Mavericks in exchange for Tyler Zeller and Kelenna Azubuike on draft night. On July 21, 2012, he signed his rookie scale contract with the Mavericks. On December 11, 2012, he was assigned to the Texas Legends. He was recalled by the Mavericks on December 31, 2012, reassigned on January 28, 2013, and recalled again on March 30, 2013.

On June 27, 2013, Cunningham was traded to the Atlanta Hawks in a draft night deal, and he later joined the Hawks for the 2013 NBA Summer League. During his sophomore season, he had multiple assignments with the Bakersfield Jam of the NBA Development League. On February 22, 2014, he was waived by the Hawks.

On March 31, 2014, Cunningham signed a 10-day contract with the Sacramento Kings. On April 10, 2014, he signed with the Kings for the rest of the season. In July 2014, he joined the Kings for the 2014 NBA Summer League but did not receive a new contract offer from the team.

On September 29, 2014, Cunningham signed with the Los Angeles Clippers. On January 7, 2015, he was traded, along with the draft rights to Cenk Akyol and cash considerations, to the Philadelphia 76ers in exchange for the draft rights to Sergei Lishouk. He was waived by the 76ers later that day.

On January 15, 2015, Cunningham was acquired by the Delaware 87ers of the NBA Development League. On March 7, he was traded to the Idaho Stampede in exchange for Joel Wright.

In July 2015, Cunningham joined the Utah Jazz for the 2015 NBA Summer League. On September 28, 2015, he signed with the Cleveland Cavaliers. On February 18, 2016, he was traded, along with a future second-round pick, to the Orlando Magic in exchange for Channing Frye. Four days later, he was waived by the Magic. On March 8, he was reacquired by the Idaho Stampede. The next day, he made his season debut for Idaho in a 114–113 loss to the Texas Legends, recording 30 points and three rebounds in 26 minutes.

On March 16, 2016, Cunningham signed a 10-day contract with the Milwaukee Bucks. On March 20, he made his debut for the Bucks in a 94–85 loss to the Utah Jazz, recording four points, one rebound, one assist and one steal in 16 minutes off the bench. Following the conclusion of his 10-day contract, the Bucks parted ways with Cunningham. On March 28, he was reacquired by the Stampede.

On August 23, 2016, Cunningham signed with Jiangsu Monkey King of the Chinese Basketball Association.

In June 2017, Cunningham signed with the Washington Wizards for the 2017 NBA Summer League.

On August 29, 2017, Cunningham signed a one-year deal with Bayern Munich of the German Basketball Bundesliga (BBL) and the EuroCup. On June 16, 2018, he won the German national championship in his first year with the team.

On November 28, 2018, Cunningham signed a deal with Italian basketball club Basket Brescia Leonessa of the LBA. He joined the Santa Cruz Warriors of the NBA G League in 2019.

On January 17, 2020, Cunningham was reported to have signed with Shanghai Sharks.

On January 25, 2021, he signed with Bnei Herzliya of the Israeli Basketball Premier League.

On September 29, 2021, Cunningham signed with the Detroit Pistons. He was waived before the start of the season and joined the Motor City Cruise. However, he was released on November 15, before playing for the Cruise.

On December 14, 2022, Cunningham signed with Pieno žvaigždės Pasvalys of the Lithuanian Basketball League (LKL).

On November 22, 2023, Cunningham signed with Vojvodina of the Basketball League of Serbia (KLS).

== Career statistics ==
=== NBA ===
Legend
GP	Games played	GS	Games started	MPG	Minutes per game
FG%	Field goal percentage	3P%	3-point field goal percentage	FT%	Free throw percentage
RPG	Rebounds per game	APG	Assists per game	SPG	Steals per game
BPG	Blocks per game	PPG	Points per game	**Bold**	Career high

Year	Team	GP	GS	MPG	FG%	3P%	FT%	RPG	APG	SPG	BPG	PPG
2012–13	Dallas	8	0	3.3	.429	**.667**	**1.000**	.4	.1	.1	.0	2.0
2013–14	Atlanta	5	0	4.4	**.500**	.000	.000	.2	**.6**	.0	.0	.4
2013–14	Sacramento	8	0	7.3	.263	.167	.929	.6	**.6**	**.4**	.0	3.0
2014–15	L.A. Clippers	19	0	4.7	.364	.308	.538	.5	.5	.2	.0	1.8
2015–16	Cleveland	**40**	**3**	8.9	.352	.313	.625	.7	.5	.3	**.1**	2.6
2015–16	Milwaukee	4	0	**13.8**	.286	.286	.357	**2.3**	.3	.5	.0	**4.0**
Career		84	3	7.2	.347	.306	.674	.7	.5	.3	.0	2.3

=== College ===
Year	Team	GP	GS	MPG	FG%	3P%	FT%	RPG	APG	SPG	BPG	PPG
2009–10	Oregon State	32	19	19.1	**.512**	.333	.747	2.0	.9	1.3	.1	6.2
2010–11	Oregon State	30	29	29.2	.437	**.360**	**.779**	3.1	2.1	**2.8**	.2	14.2
2011–12	Oregon State	**36**	**35**	**34.6**	.450	.338	.737	**3.8**	**2.8**	2.5	**.4**	**17.9**
Career		98	83	27.9	.455	.344	.754	3.0	2.0	2.2	.2	13.0
