= Nick DeWitz =

American basketball player (born 1982)

Personal information
- Born: September 16, 1982 (age 44) Chandler, Arizona, U.S.
- Listed height: 203 cm (6 ft 8 in)
- Listed weight: 104 kg (229 lb)

Career information
- High school: Dobson (Mesa, Arizona)
- College: Utah Valley (2001–2002); Iowa (2003–2004); Oregon State (2004–2006)
- NBA draft: 2006: undrafted
- Playing career: 2006–2010
- Position: Forward

Career history
- 2006–2007: Porvoon Tarmo
- 2007: Salem Stampede
- 2007–2008: Sendai 89ers
- 2008–2009: Osaka Evessa
- 2009–2010: S.L. Benfica

Career highlights
- Pac-12 Newcomer of the Year (2005)

Nicholas Adam DeWitz (born September 16, 1982) is an American former professional basketball player.

== High school ==
In high school, DeWitz attended Dobson High School in Mesa, Arizona. He was nominated for All-America honors and was an all-state selection. Helped Dobson and head coach Rick McConnell to a 28–3 record his senior year.

== College career ==
In 2001, DeWitz attended Utah Valley State College, in Orem, Utah. During his time at UVSC, he completed his associate degree in 1.5 years. Then he transferred to the University of Iowa (2003–04) where he played only half the season before transferring to Oregon State University to play under his former head coach, Jeff Reinert at UVSC. In his first year at OSU he was the first recipient of the Pac-10's Fred Hessler Award, given to the league's top non-freshman newcomer. Set the OSU single-season record for three-point percentage (50.0%, 34-for-68) and ranked second in the Pac-10. Had 37 blocks in conference play, which is tied for first on OSU’s single-season Pac-10 list.

He had a dunk vs. Washington State that was #5 on SportsCenter’s top plays of the day. DeWitz posted a career-high 28 points (the most by an OSU player in 2004–05) in a home win against California. In that game, tied the school and Gill Coliseum records with seven three-pointers made(Gary Payton), and set a school single-game record for three-point percentage with a minimum of eight attempts (.778, 7-for-9).

In OSU’s record books, ended his career first in three-point percentage (43.6%), first in blocked shots per game (2.06).

== Professional career ==
In 2006, DeWitz signed with Porvoon Tarmo of the Finnish Korisliiga, helping his team reach the playoffs, scoring 19.7 and 6.3 rebounds during playoffs. During the summer of 2007 he played in the IBL with the Salem Stampede, helping them to the best record in the league 18–4 while scoring 17 point per game. In 2007–08 DeWitz played in Japan, in the BJ league for the Sendai 89ers. He was 4th in the league in scoring 21ppg with his team finished in 3rd place. In 2008–09 he played for Osaka Evessa in the BJ league Japan and in 2009–10 he played for S.L. Benfica in the Portuguese League.
