= Curtis Berry =

American basketball player (born 1959)

Personal information
- Born: June 16, 1959 (age 67) Selma, Alabama, U.S.
- Listed height: 6 ft 7 in (2.01 m)
- Listed weight: 215 lb (98 kg)

Career information
- High school: Lutheran Academy (Selma, Alabama)
- College: Missouri (1977–1981)
- NBA draft: 1981: 3rd round, 58th overall pick
- Drafted by: Kansas City Kings
- Playing career: 1981–1984
- Position: Power forward

Career history

Playing
- 1981–1984: Lancaster Lightning

Coaching
- 1999: Atlanta Trojans

Career highlights
- CBA champion (1982); CBA All-Defensive First Team (1983)
- Stats at Basketball Reference

Curtis Berry (born June 16, 1959) is a retired American professional basketball player.

As a freshman, Berry moved to the University of Missouri campus at Columbia and averaged 6.8 points in 1978, as a sophomore collegian, he led the varsity in rebounding and was described by experts as a "bull", at the end of his collegiate career, Berry averaged 11.9 points in 112 games, his consistent performance at Missouri convinced the Kansas City Kings to make him their third round pick in the 1981 NBA draft.

Berry wore jersey number 31 at the Kings' training camp and was not able to break into the Kings' roster which was loaded with tested forwards like Cliff Robinson, Reggie King, and Leon Douglas, from the Kings' camp, Berry went to join the Lancaster Lightning in the Continental Basketball Association (CBA). He won a CBA championship with the Lightning in 1982. He was selected to the CBA All-Defensive First Team in 1983.

Berry served as head coach of the Atlanta Trojans in the United States Basketball League (USBL) during the 1999 season and accumulated a 16–9 record.

Berry is currently head boys' basketball coach at Mount Vernon Presbyterian School in Atlanta. In 2002, Berry married Dr. Jacqueline Walters, an OB-GYN; he also has a daughter, Kursten, from a previous marriage. Berry's marriage to Walters has been chronicled on the Bravo reality series Married to Medicine, of which both have been a part since the first episode in 2013.
