= Scott Haskin =

American basketball player (born 1970)

Personal information
- Born: September 19, 1970 (age 56) Riverside, California, U.S.
- Listed height: 6 ft 11 in (2.11 m)
- Listed weight: 250 lb (113 kg)

Career information
- High school: Beaumont (Beaumont, California)
- College: Oregon State (1988–1993)
- NBA draft: 1993: 1st round, 14th overall pick
- Drafted by: Indiana Pacers
- Position: Center / power forward
- Number: 43, 44

Career history
- 1993–1994: Indiana Pacers

Career highlights
- 2× First-team All-Pac-10 (1992, 1993)
- Stats at NBA.com
- Stats at Basketball Reference

Scott Russell Haskin (born September 19, 1970) is an American former professional basketball player who was selected by the Indiana Pacers in the first round (14th pick overall) of the 1993 NBA draft. Haskin played one season in the National Basketball Association (NBA) for the Pacers, appearing in 27 games and averaging 2.0 ppg. He played collegiately at Oregon State University.
