= Ralph Miller =

American basketball coach (1919–2001)

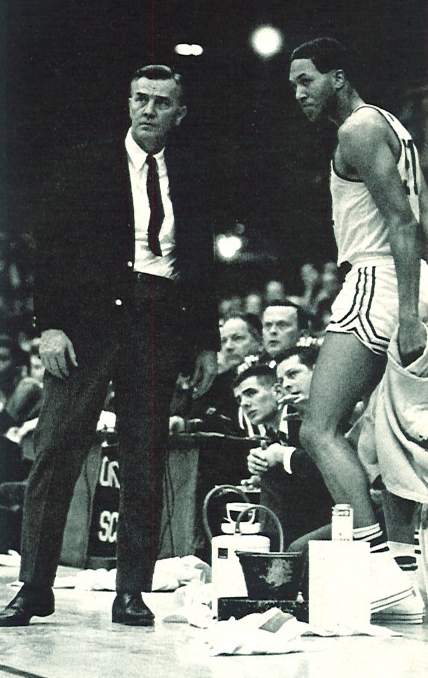
- Miller from 1968 Hawkeye

Biographical details
- Born: March 9, 1919; Chanute, Kansas, U.S.
- Died: May 15, 2001 (aged 82); Black Butte Ranch, Oregon, U.S.

Playing career
- 1937–1941: Kansas

Coaching career (HC unless noted)
- 1951–1964: Wichita
- 1964–1970: Iowa
- 1970–1989: Oregon State

Head coaching record
- Overall: 657–382

Accomplishments and honors

Championships
- MVC regular season (1964); 2 Big Ten regular season (1968, 1970); 4 Pac-10 regular season (1980–1982, 1984)

Awards
- 2× AP Coach of the Year (1981, 1982); Henry Iba Award (1981); NABC Coach of the Year (1981); UPI Coach of the Year (1981); 2× Pac-10 Coach of the Year (1981, 1989)

Records
- Military career
- Allegiance: United States
- Branch: U.S. Army Air Forces
- Rank: First lieutenant
- Conflicts: World War II (stateside)
- Basketball Hall of Fame; Inducted in 1988
- College Basketball Hall of Fame; Inducted in 2006

Football career

Profile
- Position: End
- Class: 1941

Career information
- High school: Chanute (KS)
- College: Kansas (1937–1941)

Awards and highlights
- Second-team All-Big Six (1941)

Ralph H. Miller (March 9, 1919 – May 15, 2001) was an American college basketball coach, a head coach for 38 years at three universities: Wichita (now known as Wichita State), Iowa, and Oregon State. With an overall record of 657–382 (.632), his teams had losing records only three times. Prior to his final season, he was enshrined in the Basketball Hall of Fame on May 3, 1988. Miller played college football and basketball at the University of Kansas. His performance on the football team led to him being selected in the 1942 NFL draft, but he chose to serve in the military instead of playing in the NFL.

== Early life ==
Born and raised in Chanute, Kansas, Miller was a standout athlete in high school and college. At Chanute High School, he won letters in football, track, basketball, golf and tennis. Miller was an all-state basketball player for three years and set the state record in the low hurdles in 1937. He was all-state three consecutive years in football and basketball.

== College career ==
In college at the University of Kansas in Lawrence, Miller won three letters as a football quarterback and three in basketball. By 1940, he was beating the 1932 gold medalist in the decathlon Jim Bausch in seven of ten events.

As an undergraduate, he was coached by Phog Allen. In one of Miller's classes, a guest lecturer was Dr. James Naismith, the inventor of basketball. Miller was also a member of Phi Kappa Psi fraternity at KU.

He earned a bachelor's degree in physical education in 1942. He also drafted in the 18th round (167th overall selection) of the 1942 NFL draft by the Brooklyn Dodgers. He declined playing in the NFL and instead took a personnel department job with the Aero Parts Manufacturing Company. When the company formed the Wichita Aero Commandos football team in 1942, Miller became the starting quarterback.

The "flashy passer" Miller saw his 1942 season come to an abrupt end at the hands of the Chicago Cardinals of the NFL, who played an exhibition game against the Aero Commandos in Wichita's Lawrence Stadium on November 15, during what would otherwise have been a bye week. Midway through the first half Miller suffered an unspecified injury that forced his removal and ended his year.

== Coaching career ==
=== Early jobs ===
Miller's first coaching position was at Mount Oread High School in Lawrence, and the team consisted primarily of professors' sons. The season did not go well and left a sour taste in his mouth towards coaching basketball.

=== Military career interruption ===
Miller later joined the Army Air Forces for three years, leaving as a first lieutenant. Miller didn't have to go overseas during World War II because of knee problems that began at KU. He enlisted in the Air Force and held desk jobs in Florida, Texas, and California. After the war, he became an assistant director of recreation and oversaw a swimming pool and playground in Redlands, California. Soon, he joined a friend in the business of hauling fruit.

=== Return to coaching ===
In 1949, eight years after his ill-fated first attempt at coaching, a friend from Wichita named Fritz Snodgrass sent Miller a telegram asking if he might be interested in returning to guide his son's team at East High School. At East, Miller became a student of the game. He was fascinated by the full-court press zone defense that had been developed at Kansas in 1930, but he wondered why it was only used after a basket was made. Nobody could give Miller a solid answer, and so he began tinkering with ways to press after missed shots, too. His idea was to assign each player a man to guard, and when an errant shot went up, they were immediately to pick up their man. His ideas were very successful. In three years at East High, Miller's teams finished second, third and first in the state using his system of execution and pressure basketball.

=== Wichita ===
In 1951, the president of Municipal University of Wichita (now Wichita State University) offered him a job. Miller spent 13 years at Wichita, winning 220 games, earning three NIT berths and a spot in the NCAA tournament in 1964.

=== Iowa ===
In the spring of 1964, Miller left for the Iowa of the Big Ten Conference, where he built one of the greatest offensive juggernauts in NCAA history. In his first season he coached Jimmy Rodgers who would go on to be a notable coach in his own right. The Hawkeyes averaged more than 100 points a game in Big Ten play in 1970 and went undefeated (14–0) in the Big Ten with a 19–4 regular season record. Entering the NCAA tournament, Iowa was on a sixteen-game winning streak and played their first game in the Sweet Sixteen, but were upset by independent Jacksonville, the eventual national runner-up. After a consolation win over Notre Dame, the Hawkeyes finished at 20–5 overall.

=== Oregon State ===
A month later in April 1970, Miller was offered the job at Oregon State. Miller had only two losing seasons in 19 years at OSU, and retired as the second winningest head coach in Oregon State history with 359 victories, behind Slats Gill.

=== Retirement ===
Miller retired at age 70 in 1989, his final regular season win was a comfortable one, over rival Oregon at a sold-out Gill Coliseum on Sunday, March 5. The Beavers lost to top-ranked Arizona in the semifinals of the Pac-10 tourney, then fell in the first round of the NCAA tournament to Evansville at Tucson.

=== Legacy ===
Miller's career record was 657–382 (.632); the 657 victories were the most by an active coach and ranked him seventh among major college coaches, trailing only Adolph Rupp (876), Hank Iba (767), Ed Diddle (759), Phog Allen (746), Ray Meyer (724), and John Wooden (664). Miller's teams actually won 674 games, but the total was reduced by forfeits because one of his players, Lonnie Shelton, had signed with an agent while still in college in 1976.

The floor of Gill Coliseum is named Ralph Miller Court, and the street in front of the venue was renamed Ralph Miller Drive shortly upon his retirement.

== Personal life ==
In the fall of 1937 at the University of Kansas, Miller took a physiology class where the students were seated alphabetically. Next to him was an attractive student from Topeka named Emily Jean Milam; five years later they were married. The couple had two sons, Ralph Jr. and Paul, and two daughters, Susan Langer and Shannon Jakosky.

The gymnasium at Chanute High School is named after Miller, and is home to the Ralph Miller Classic, an eight-team tournament.

Miller had an unequaled addiction to cigarettes, and chain-smoked More brand cigarettes during practices, on team buses, and in his office.

A dozen years after his retirement, Miller died in his sleep at age 82 at his home at Black Butte Ranch, northwest of Bend. He had suffered from congestive heart failure and complications from emphysema. His wife Jean died at age 93 in 2014 in Bend.

== Head coaching record ==
Record table
Season	Team	Overall	Conference	Standing	Postseason
Wichita Shockers (Missouri Valley Conference) (1951–1964)
1951–52	Wichita	11–19	2–8	6th	
1952–53	Wichita	16–11	3–7	6th	
1953–54	Wichita	27–4	8–2	2nd	NIT first round
1954–55	Wichita	17–9	4–6	4th	
1955–56	Wichita	14–12	7–5	4th	
1956–57	Wichita	15–11	8–6	4th	
1957–58	Wichita	14–12	6–8	4th	
1958–59	Wichita	14–12	7–7	4th	
1959–60	Wichita	14–12	6–8	4th	
1960–61	Wichita	18–8	6–6	4th	
1961–62	Wichita	18–9	7–5	3rd	NIT first round
1962–63	Wichita	19–8	7–5	2nd	NIT first round
1963–64	Wichita	23–5	10–2	1st	NCAA University Division Elite Eight
Wichita:		220–133	81–75		
Iowa Hawkeyes (Big Ten Conference) (1964–1970)
1964–65	Iowa	14–10	8–6	5th	
1965–66	Iowa	17–7	8–6	3rd	
1966–67	Iowa	16–8	9–5	3rd	
1967–68	Iowa	16–9	10–4	T-1st	
1968–69	Iowa	12–12	5–9	8th	
1969–70	Iowa	20–5	14–0	1st	NCAA University Division Sweet 16
Iowa:		95–51	54–30		
Oregon State Beavers (Pacific-8/Pacific-10 Conference) (1970–1989)
1970–71	Oregon State	12–14	4–10	6th	
1971–72	Oregon State	18–10	9–5	3rd	
1972–73	Oregon State	15–11	6–8	5th	
1973–74	Oregon State	13–13	6–8	5th	
1974–75	Oregon State	19–12	10–4	2nd	NCAA Division I second round
1975–76	Oregon State	18–9*	10–4	2nd	
1976–77	Oregon State	16–13	8–6	3rd	
1977–78	Oregon State	16–11	9–5	2nd	
1978–79	Oregon State	18–10	11–7	3rd	NIT first round
1979–80	Oregon State	26–4**	16–2	1st	NCAA Division I second round
1980–81	Oregon State	26–2**	17–1	1st	NCAA Division I second round
1981–82	Oregon State	25–5***	16–2	1st	NCAA Division I Elite Eight
1982–83	Oregon State	20–11	12–6	3rd	NIT quarterfinal
1983–84	Oregon State	22–7	15–3	1st	NCAA Division I first round
1984–85	Oregon State	22–9	12–6	2nd	NCAA Division I first round
1985–86	Oregon State	12–15	8–10	5th	
1986–87	Oregon State	19–11	10–8	3rd	NIT second round
1987–88	Oregon State	20–11	12–6	2nd	NCAA Division I first round
1988–89	Oregon State	22–8	13–5	3rd	NCAA Division I first round
Oregon State:		342–198****	204–114		
Total:		657–382****			
National champion Postseason invitational champion Conference regular season champion Conference regular season and conference tournament champion Division regular season champion Division regular season and conference tournament champion Conference tournament champion

* 15 wins were forfeited and official record for that season is 3–24
** 1 NCAA Tournament loss was vacated
*** 2 NCAA Tournament wins and 1 loss were vacated
**** Official record with vacated and forfeited wins and losses

== See also ==
- List of college men's basketball coaches with 600 wins
