= Steve Johnson (basketball) =

American basketball player (born 1957)

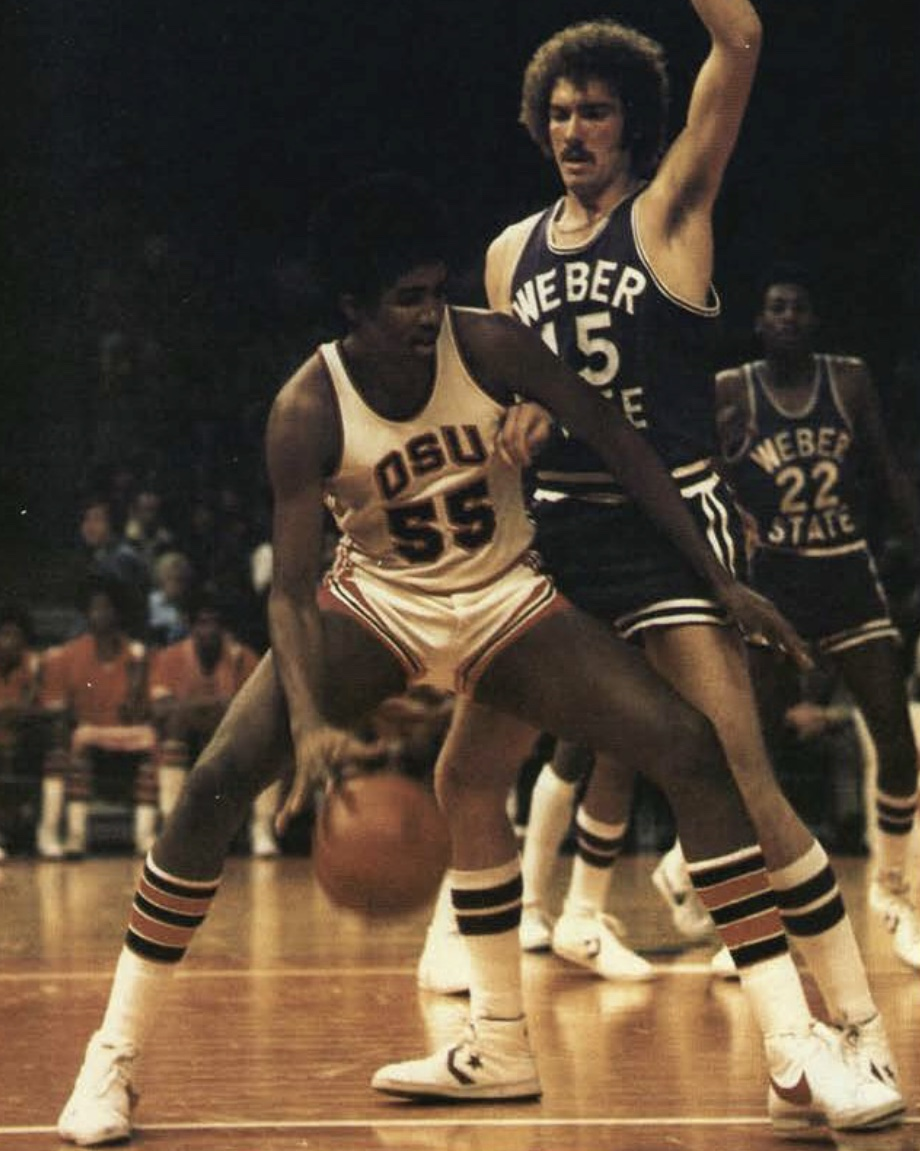
- Johnson as a freshman at Oregon State

Personal information
- Born: November 3, 1957 (age 69) Akron, Ohio, U.S.
- Listed height: 6 ft 10 in (2.08 m)
- Listed weight: 235 lb (107 kg)

Career information
- High school: San Gorgonio (San Bernardino, California)
- College: Oregon State (1976–1981)
- NBA draft: 1981: 1st round, 7th overall pick
- Drafted by: Kansas City Kings
- Playing career: 1981–1991
- Position: Power forward / center
- Number: 33, 32

Career history
- 1981–1984: Kansas City Kings
- 1984–1985: Chicago Bulls
- 1985–1986: San Antonio Spurs
- 1986–1989: Portland Trail Blazers
- 1989–1990: Minnesota Timberwolves
- 1990: Seattle SuperSonics
- 1990–1991: Golden State Warriors

Career highlights
- NBA All-Star (1988); Consensus first-team All-American (1981); Pac-10 Player of the Year (1981); 3× First-team All-Pac-10 (1979–1981); No. 33 retired by Oregon State Beavers

Career NBA statistics
- Points: 7,345 (11.7 ppg)
- Rebounds: 3,450 (5.5 rpg)
- Assists: 777 (1.2 apg)
- Stats at NBA.com
- Stats at Basketball Reference

Clarence Stephen Johnson (born November 3, 1957) is an American former professional basketball player who played in the National Basketball Association (NBA). He played the power forward and center positions.

== Collegiate career ==
Johnson played collegiately at Oregon State University under Naismith Hall of Fame coach Ralph Miller. He was the star player on the 1980–81 team (known as the Orange Express) which reached as high as no. 1 in the national rankings, before being upset in the second round of the 1981 NCAA Division I Basketball Tournament by eighth-seeded Kansas State. That season, Johnson made 235 of 315 field goals for a field goal percentage of .746, a single-season mark which was an NCAA men's basketball record until March 16, 2017, when Devontae Cacok of UNCW finished with a field goal percentage of .800 of 230 shots.

== Professional career ==
He was drafted the following summer, with the seventh pick overall, by the Kansas City Kings in the 1981 NBA draft, and played with the Kings from 1981 to 1984 before being traded to the Chicago Bulls. After a season and a half with the Bulls, Johnson played one season with the San Antonio Spurs. While with the Spurs, Johnson led the league in field goal percentage at .632, which was one of the highest in NBA history.

During the 1986 off-season, Johnson was traded to the Portland Trail Blazers for longtime Portland's fixture Mychal Thompson; the team intended to start Johnson at power forward alongside defensive-minded center Sam Bowie. Five games into the season, however, Bowie suffered a broken leg (one of many such injuries he would endure in his ill-fated career), and Johnson was moved to the starting center role, with aging veteran Caldwell Jones replacing him at power forward. Only a couple games later, on November 26, 1986, Johnson scored a career-best 40 points, while also grabbing 10 rebounds, during a 118–114 loss to the Cleveland Cavaliers. That year, Johnson enjoyed his best season, averaging nearly 17 points per game, while averaging a .555 field goal percentage.

The next season, Bowie again broke his leg, and Johnson assumed the starting center position. Unfortunately for him, he would himself be injured, and was replaced in the lineup by Kevin Duckworth, whose stellar play earned him the job permanently. Nevertheless, Johnson earned a selection on the West All-Star team, but was unable to play due to injury. An attempt to start both players in a dual-post configuration, and the Johnson/Duckworth controversy was one of several which distracted the team in the 1988–89 season (which led to a losing record and a first-round playoff sweep). After that season, the rather unhappy Johnson was left unprotected in the 1989 NBA expansion draft, and was selected by the Minnesota Timberwolves. Johnson, unhappy with being drafted by an expansion team, played only four games for the Timberwolves before being traded to the Seattle SuperSonics; he played only 21 games for Seattle that season. He played 24 games for the Golden State Warriors the following year; and retired at the conclusion of the 1990–91 season.

Johnson holds the NCAA single season and career records for field goal percentage. He led the NBA in personal fouls during the 1981–82 and 1986–87 seasons, and led the NBA in disqualifications during the 1981–82, 1985–86, and 1986–87 seasons.

== Personal life ==
Johnson, who retired from playing and permanently settled in Portland, now works with an organization called The Best of Yachting and is an investor in business in the area.

== NBA career statistics ==
Legend
GP	Games played	GS	Games started	MPG	Minutes per game
FG%	Field goal percentage	3P%	3-point field goal percentage	FT%	Free throw percentage
RPG	Rebounds per game	APG	Assists per game	SPG	Steals per game
BPG	Blocks per game	PPG	Points per game	**Bold**	Career high
*	Led the league

=== Regular season ===
Year	Team	GP	GS	MPG	FG%	3P%	FT%	RPG	APG	SPG	BPG	PPG
1981–82	Kansas City	78	50	22.3	.613	—	.642	5.9	1.2	.5	**1.1**	12.8
1982–83	Kansas City	79	21	19.5	.624	—	.574	5.0	1.2	.5	**1.1**	11.7
1983–84	Kansas City	**50**	12	17.9	.553	—	.571	5.0	1.3	.4	1.0	9.6
1983–84	Chicago	**31**	9	19.2	.571	—	.582	5.4	.6	.5	.7	9.4
1984–85	Chicago	74	54	22.4	.545	.000	**.718**	5.9	.9	.5	.8	10.0
1985–86	San Antonio	71	55	25.7	**.632***	—	.694	6.5	1.3	**.6**	.9	13.8
1986–87	Portland	79	**74**	**29.7**	.556	—	.698	**7.2**	**2.0**	**.6**	1.0	**16.8**
1987–88	Portland	43	33	24.4	.529	.000	.586	5.6	1.3	.4	.7	15.4
1988–89	Portland	72	11	20.5	.524	—	.527	5.0	1.5	.3	.6	10.0
1989–90	Minnesota	4	0	4.3	.000	—	—	.8	.3	.0	.0	.0
1989–90	Seattle	21	0	11.5	.533	—	.600	2.4	.8	.1	.2	5.6
1990–91	Golden State	24	8	9.5	.540	—	.595	2.4	.7	.2	.2	3.8
Career		626	327	21.8	.572	.000	.634	5.5	1.2	.5	.8	11.7

=== Playoffs ===
Year	Team	GP	GS	MPG	FG%	3P%	FT%	RPG	APG	SPG	BPG	PPG
1985	Chicago	3	0	7.3	.286	—	**1.000**	1.7	**.7**	.0	.0	2.0
1986	San Antonio	3	0	17.7	.333	—	.455	2.0	**.7**	.0	**.3**	5.0
1987	Portland	**4**	**4**	**34.3**	**.459**	—	.628	**10.0**	.5	.5	**.3**	**20.8**
1989	Portland	3	0	11.3	.250	—	**1.000**	2.0	.0	**.7**	.0	2.3
Career		13	4	18.9	.407	—	.627	4.4	.5	.3	.2	8.5

== See also ==
- List of NBA career field goal percentage leaders
