= Mark Radford (basketball) =

American basketball player

Personal information
- Born: July 5, 1959 (age 67) Tacoma, Washington, U.S.
- Listed height: 6 ft 4 in (1.93 m)
- Listed weight: 190 lb (86 kg)

Career information
- High school: Grant (Portland, Oregon)
- College: Oregon State (1977–1981)
- NBA draft: 1981: 3rd round, 53rd overall pick
- Drafted by: Seattle SuperSonics
- Playing career: 1981–1983
- Position: Shooting guard
- Number: 30

Career history
- 1981–1983: Seattle SuperSonics
- 1983–1984: Wyoming Wildcatters

Career highlights
- First-team All-Pac-10 (1981)
- Stats at NBA.com
- Stats at Basketball Reference

Mark Jeffrey Radford (born July 5, 1959) is an American former National Basketball Association (NBA) player who played from 1981 to 1983. He played college basketball for the Oregon State Beavers from 1977 to 1981, and was drafted in the third round (53rd overall) of the 1981 NBA draft by the Seattle SuperSonics. He played in 97 career games over two seasons for the SuperSonics. He has a career high 22 points, 5 rebounds, 7 assists, 4 steals and 2 blocks. he had a career average of 3.6 points, 0.8 rebounds, 1.7 assists, 0.5 steals, 0.1 blocks and 1.2 turnovers.

Radford has two children, Armin and Nina, the latter of which went on to play collegiate basketball for Northern Arizona University.

== Career statistics ==
Legend
GP	Games played	GS	Games started	MPG	Minutes per game
FG%	Field goal percentage	3P%	3-point field goal percentage	FT%	Free throw percentage
RPG	Rebounds per game	APG	Assists per game	SPG	Steals per game
BPG	Blocks per game	PPG	Points per game	**Bold**	Career high

=== NBA ===
==== Regular season ====
Year	Team	GP	GS	MPG	FG%	3P%	FT%	RPG	APG	SPG	BPG	PPG
1981–82	Seattle	43	0	**8.6**	**.540**	**.667**	**.507**	.7	1.3	.4	.0	3.4
1982–83	Seattle	**54**	**2**	8.1	.488	.222	.411	**.9**	**1.9**	**.6**	**.1**	**3.7**
Career		97	2	8.3	.507	.286	.458	.8	1.7	.5	.1	3.6
