= Oregon State Beavers men's basketball =

Men's Basketball Team

2026–27 Oregon State Beavers men's basketball team
- University: Oregon State University
- First season: 1901–02; 125 years ago
- Head coach: Justin Joyner (1st season)
- Location: Corvallis, Oregon
- Arena: Gill Coliseum (capacity: 9,301)
- Conference: Pac-12
- Nickname: Beavers
- Colors: Orange and black
- Student section: Beaver Dam
- All-time record: 1783–1375 (.565)

NCAA Division I tournament Final Four
- 1949, 1963
Other NCAA Division I tournament results
Elite Eight	1947, 1949, 1955, 1962, 1963, 1966, 1982*, 2021
Sweet Sixteen	1955, 1962, 1963, 1966, 1975, 1982*, 2021
Appearances	1947, 1949, 1955, 1962, 1963, 1964, 1966, 1975, 1980*, 1981*, 1982*, 1984, 1985, 1988, 1989, 1990, 2016, 2021

Conference tournament champions
- 2021

Conference regular-season champions
- 1909, 1912, 1916, 1918, 1933, 1947, 1949, 1955, 1958, 1966, 1980, 1981, 1982, 1984, 1990

Uniforms
Home	Away	Alternate
- * vacated by NCAA

The Oregon State Beavers men's basketball program, established in 1901, is the intercollegiate men's basketball program of Oregon State University in Corvallis, Oregon. The program will transition back to the Pac-12 Conference in the NCAA Division I in 2026–27. The team plays home games on campus at Gill Coliseum, and the current head coach is Justin Joyner.

Oregon State has won 14 conference championships and appeared in the NCAA tournament 18 times (three (1980–82) were later vacated by the NCAA). The Beavers have advanced to the Final Four twice (1949, 1963), and their most recent tournament appearance was in 2021, when they advanced to the Elite Eight after winning their first tournament games since 1982.

As of the 2023 season the Oregon State men's basketball holds the NCAA record for most games played against a single opponent with 362 games played against the Oregon Ducks men's basketball team and the NCAA record for 2nd most victories against a single opponent with 195 victories against the Ducks.

== Conferences ==
Years	Conference
1901–1908	Independent
1908–1915	Northwest Conference (NWC)
1915–1959	Pacific Coast Conference (PCC)
1959–1964	Independent
1964–2024; 2026–present	Pac-12 Conference ^
2024–2026	West Coast Conference

^ Pac-12's previous names: AAWU (1959–1968), Pacific-8 (1968–1978), and Pacific-10 (1978–2011)

== Coaches ==
The Oregon State men's basketball team has had 22 head coaches, with one interim (2008). Both Amory T. "Slats" Gill and Ralph Miller are members of the Naismith Memorial Basketball Hall of Fame. Craig Robinson, the coach preceding Wayne Tinkle, was hired by OSU in 2008 out of Brown University, where he had just coached the Bears to a school-record 19 wins. Robinson is the brother of United States first lady Michelle Obama, and the brother-in-law to United States President Barack Obama. The longest-tenured head coach was Slats Gill, who was the coach for 36 seasons, winning 599 games during his time at OSU. Wayne Tinkle, was hired by OSU in 2014 from the University of Montana – Missoula, where he coached the Montana Grizzlies to two Big Sky Conference championships and a school-record 25 wins. In March 2026, Oregon State dismissed Tinkle after 12 seasons and hired Justin Joyner as his successor. Joyner came to Oregon State after two seasons as an assistant coach at Michigan under Dusty May, helping the Wolverines win the 2026 NCAA championship, and previously served on Randy Bennett's staff at Saint Mary's, where the Gaels won multiple West Coast Conference titles.

Head Coach	Years	Record	Pct.
J. B. Patterson	1902	1–2	.333
J. W. Viggers	1903	5–1	.883
W. O. Trine	1904–1907	39–7	.848
Roy Heater	1908	7–4	.636
E. D. Angell	1909–1910	19–8	.704
Clifford Reed	1911	3–5	.375
E. J. Stewart	1912–1916	67–33	.670
Everett May	1917	11–7	.611
Howard Ray	1918	15–0	1.000
Homer Woodson Hargiss	1919–1920	10–25	.286
Dick Rutherford	1921–1922	27–19	.587
Bob Hager	1923–1928	115–53	.685
Slats Gill	1929–1964	599–392	.604
Paul Valenti	1965–1970	91–82	.526
Ralph Miller	1971–1989	359–186	.659
Jim Anderson	1990–1995	79–90	.467
Eddie Payne	1996–2000	52–88	.371
Ritchie McKay	2001–2002	22–37	.372
Jay John	2003–2008	72–97	.426
Kevin Mouton (interim)	2008	0–13	.000
Craig Robinson	2008–2014	93–104	.469
Wayne Tinkle	2014–2026	140–177	.442
Justin Joyner	2026–present	0–0	.000

== History ==
=== 1980–83 – Orange Express ===
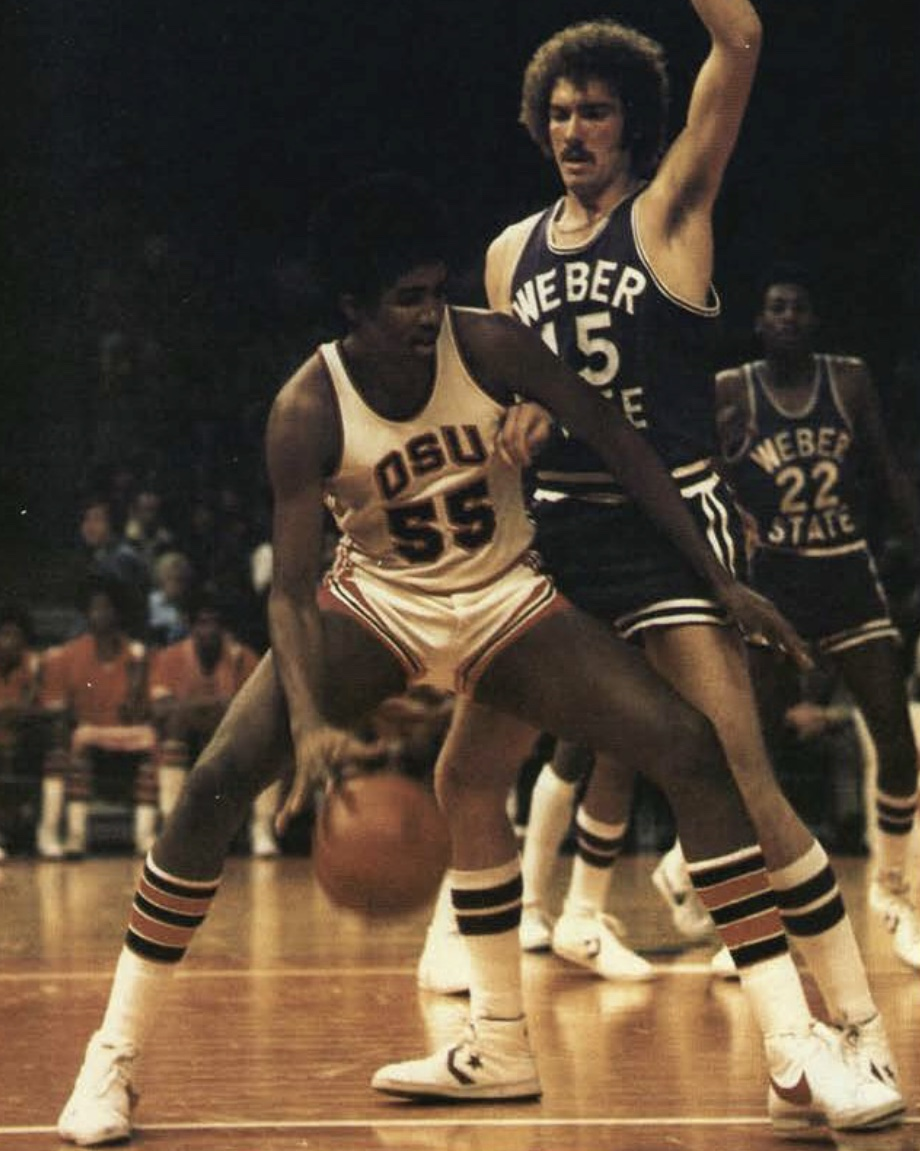
Steve Johnson as a freshman at OSU

The 1980–81 Oregon State men's basketball season was arguably one of the best yet most upsetting basketball seasons in Oregon State history. The team was referred to as the Orange Express and was led by Beaver legendary coach Ralph Miller. The Orange Express season was led by Beaver great, Steve Johnson, in his last year at OSU, and the Beavers were second in the final polls, released prior to the NCAA tournament. This was the first time in OSU history that the Beavers won at UCLA, and the Orange Express spent a school record eight weeks ranked first in at least one of the AP and Coaches Polls. At the end of the regular season, the Beavers were 26–1 and entered the 48-team NCAA tournament as the top seed in the West region. They had a bye in the first round, but were upset in their opening game by #8 seed Kansas State 50–48 in the second round, at Pauley Pavilion in Los Angeles. Miller was awarded UPI and AP Coach of the Year honors and Steve Johnson received All-American honors.

For three seasons beginning in 1980–81, OSU posted an overall record of 77–11 (.875), second only to DePaul's 79–6 record over the same seasons. The Beavers' record included a 35–1 home record at Gill Coliseum, including a school best 24 consecutive home wins.

However, NCAA sanctions followed these standout teams. The NCAA found that many players, from 1979 to 1983 were involved in improper arrangements with outside representative related to the purchase of complimentary basketball tickets and the receipt of other prohibited benefits. The NCAA vacated appearances from the 1980, 1981, and 1982 tournaments.

== Postseason ==
=== NCAA tournament results ===
The Beavers have appeared in the NCAA tournament 18 times. Their combined record is 15–21. OSU had three NCAA Tournament appearances (1980, 1981 and 1982) vacated by the NCAA, resulting in 15 recognized appearances and an "official" NCAA Tournament record of 13–18. Their former 46-year drought between "official" tournament wins was the longest drought of any team from a major conference.

Year	Seed	Round	Opponent	Result
1947		Elite Eight; Regional 3rd Place	Oklahoma; Wyoming	L 55–56; W 63–46
1949		Elite Eight; Final Four; National 3rd Place	Arkansas; Oklahoma A&M; Illinois	W 56–38; L 30–55; L 53–57
1955		Round of 24; Sweet Sixteen; Elite Eight	Bye; Seattle; San Francisco	W 83–71; L 56–57
1962		Round of 25; Sweet Sixteen; Elite Eight	Seattle; Pepperdine #19 UCLA	W 69–65 ^{OT} W 69–67; L 69–88
1963		Round of 25; Sweet Sixteen; Elite Eight; Final Four; National 3rd Place	Seattle; San Francisco #4 Arizona State #1 Cincinnati #2 Duke	W 70–66; W 65–31; W 83–65; L 46–80; L 63–85
1964		Round of 25	Seattle	L 57–61
1966		Round of 22; Sweet Sixteen; Elite Eight	Bye; Houston; Utah	W 63–60; L 64–70
1975		Round of 32; Sweet Sixteen; Regional 3rd Place	Middle Tennessee State #3 Indiana; Central Michigan	W 78–67; L 71–81; L 87–88
1980*	2 W	Round of 48; Round of 32	Bye (10) Lamar	L 77–81*
1981*	1 W	Round of 48; Round of 32	Bye (8) Kansas State	L 48–50*
1982*	2 W	Round of 48; Round of 32; Sweet Sixteen; Elite Eight	Bye (7) Pepperdine (3) #8 Idaho (1) #6 Georgetown	W 70–51*; W 60–42*; L 45–69*
1984	6 ME	Round of 48	(11) West Virginia	L 62–64
1985	10 S	Round of 64	(7) Notre Dame	L 70–79
1988	12 S	Round of 64	(5) Louisville	L 61–70
1989	6 W	Round of 64	(11) Evansville	L 90–94 ^{OT}
1990	5 W	Round of 64	(12) Ball State	L 53–54
2016	7 W	Round of 64	(10) VCU	L 67–75
2021	12 MW	Round of 64; Round of 32; Sweet Sixteen; Elite Eight	(5) Tennessee (4) #11 Oklahoma State (8) #17 Loyola–Chicago (2) #6 Houston	W 70–56; W 80–70; W 65–58; L 61–67

* Appearances and results from 1980, 1981, and 1982 were later vacated by the NCAA.

=== NIT results ===
The Beavers have appeared in the National Invitation Tournament (NIT) four times, with a combined record of 3–4.

Year	Round	Opponent	Result
1979	First Round	Nevada	L 61–62
1983	First Round; Second Round; Quarterfinals	Idaho; New Orleans; Fresno State	W 77–59; W 88–71; L 67–76
1987	First Round; Second Round	New Mexico; California	W 85–82; L 62–65
2005	Opening Round	Cal State Fullerton	L 83–85

=== CBI results ===
The Beavers have appeared in the College Basketball Invitational (CBI) four times.
Their combined record is 7–4, and they were the champions in 2009.

Year	Round	Opponent	Result
2009	First Round; Quarterfinals; Semifinals; Finals–Game 1 Finals–Game 2 Finals–Game 3	Houston; Vermont; Stanford; UTEP; UTEP; UTEP	W 49–45; W 71–70 ^{OT} W 66–63 ^{OT} W 75–69; L 63–70; W 81–73
2010	First Round	Boston University	L 78–96
2012	First Round; Quarterfinals; Semifinals	Western Illinois; TCU; Washington State	W 80–59; W 101–81; L 55–72
2014	First Round	Radford	L 92–96

=== CBC results ===
The Beavers have appeared in the College Basketball Crown (CBC) one time. Their record is 0-1.

Year	Round	Opponent	Result
2025	First Round	UCF	L 75–76

== All-time record vs. Pac-12 opponents ==
Opponent	Wins	Losses	Pct.	Streak
Arizona	23	72	.242	OSU 1
Arizona St.	45	55	.450	ASU 1
California	62	87	.416	Cal 1
Colorado	11	21	.343	Colorado 2
Oregon	195	172	.534	Oregon 7
Stanford	73	73	.500	Stanford 3
UCLA	38	100	.275	UCLA 6
USC	64	73	.467	OSU 1
Utah	17	20	.459	OSU 1
Washington	140	163	.462	Washington 3
Wash. St.	176	132	.570	OSU 1

- Note all-time series includes non-conference matchups.

== Rivalries ==
Oregon Ducks — Oregon State's main rivalry (The Civil War) is with the Ducks. As of the 2023 season the Oregon State men's basketball holds the NCAA record for most games played against a single opponent with 362 games played against the Oregon Ducks men's basketball team and the NCAA record for 2nd most victories against a single opponent with 195 victories against the Ducks.

Washington Huskies — The Dog Fight is one of Oregon State's lesser-known rivalry games. As of 2023 they also have played rivals the Washington Huskies men's basketball 310 times (NCAA record 3rd most)

Washington State Cougars — The Land-Grant Rivalry as land-grant universities, WSU and OSU have a longtime regional rivalry. As of 2023 they also have played rivals the Washington State Cougars men's basketball 308 times (NCAA record 4th most) and have beaten the Cougars 176 times (NCAA record 6th most)

Arizona Wildcats – The Cat's Meow was coined during the 1980s Ralph Miller era when the Beavers would match-up against famed-coach Lute Olson's squad.

== Notable players ==
Oregon State has had 75 all-conference and 32 All-America selections, five Pac-10 Players of the Year, 42 players selected in the NBA draft, and 24 players that have gone on to play in the NBA. Additionally, OSU basketball alumni have 4 gold medals at the Olympics, including one by Lew Beck, who never played in the NBA. A total of 9 players have won 13 NBA titles, including three by A.C. Green, two by Brent Barry, two by Mel Counts, and one each by Red Rocha, Dave Gambee, Lonnie Shelton, Eric Moreland, Gary Payton and Gary Payton II .

=== NBA players ===
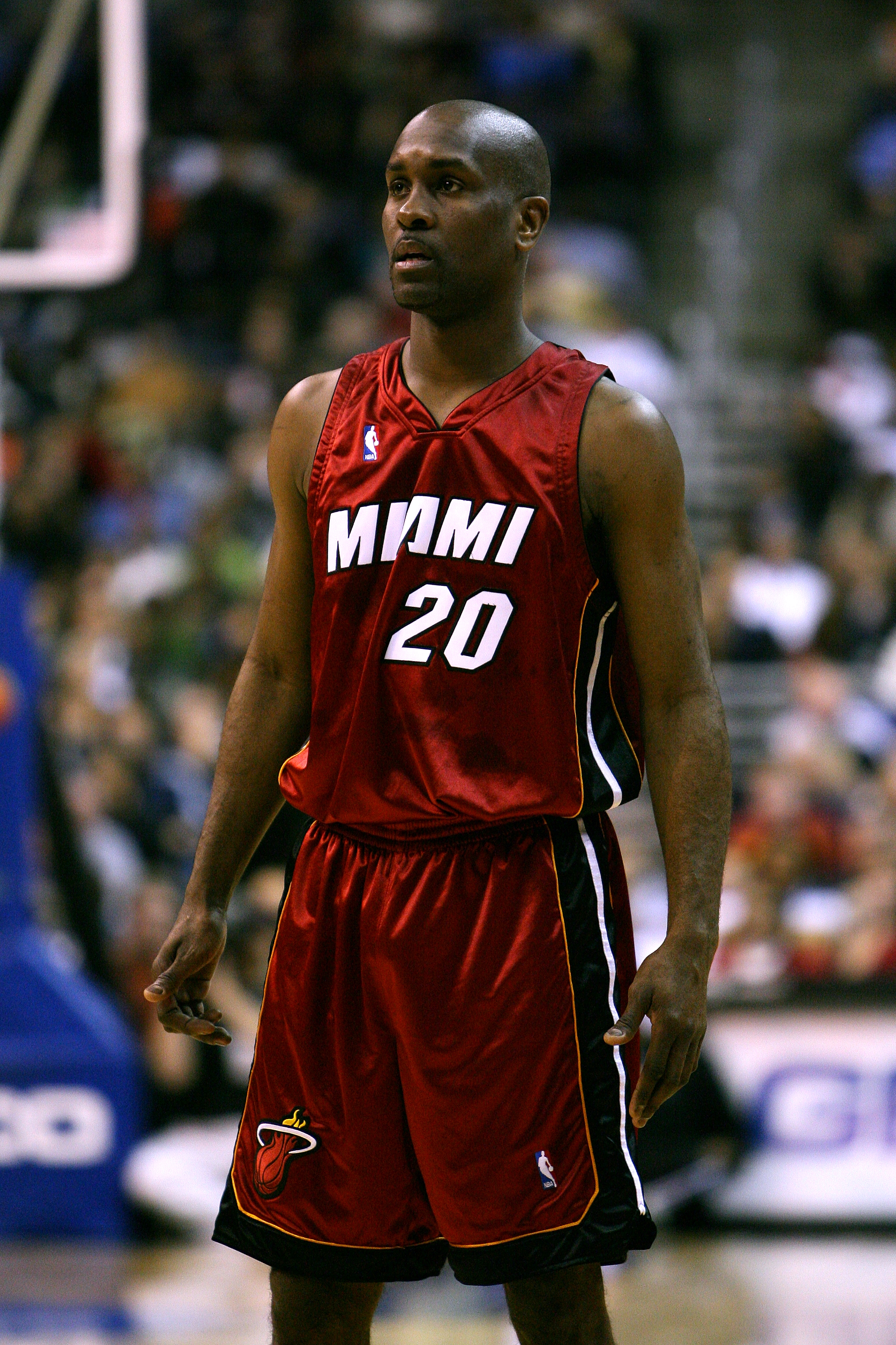
Gary Payton in 2007

- Brent Barry
- Vic Bartolome
- Corey Benjamin
- Ricky Berry
- Ray Blume
- Freddie Boyd
- Jay Carty
- Lester Conner
- Mel Counts
- Jared Cunningham
- Drew Eubanks
- Gary Freeman
- Dave Gambee
- A.C. Green
- Swede Halbrook
- Scott Haskin
- Jim Jarvis
- Omari Johnson
- Steve Johnson
- John Mandic
- Eric Moreland
- José Ortiz
- Gary Payton
- Gary Payton II
- Loy Petersen
- Mark Radford
- Red Rocha
- Lonnie Shelton
- Charlie Sitton
- Ethan Thompson
- Kylor Kelley

=== International league players ===
- Stephen Thompson Jr. (born 1997), basketball player in the Israeli Basketball Premier League

=== Retired numbers ===
Oregon State has retired the jersey numbers of five players:

Oregon State Beavers retired numbers
No.	Player	Career	No. ret.	Ref.
20	Gary Payton	1986–1990	1996	
21	Mel Counts	1961–1964	1996	
25	Ed Lewis	1930–1933	1999	
33	Steve Johnson	1976–1981	1996	
45	A.C. Green	1981–1985	1996	

== NCAA records ==
The individual and team NCAA records below are current as of the end of the 2015–16 season.

Individual Records

- Field Goal Percentage (Single season)
  - 1st – 74.6% — Steve Johnson, 1981 (235 of 315)
  - 5th – 71.0% — Steve Johnson, 1980 (211 of 297)
- Field Goal Percentage (Career, min. 400 made and 4 made per game)
  - 1st – 67.8% — Steve Johnson, 1976–81 (828 of 1,222)
- Field Goal Percentage (Single game, min. 12 field goals made)
  - 1st (tie) – 100% Steve Johnson vs. Hawaii-Hilo (13 of 13), Dec. 5, 1979
- Field Goal Percentage – Senior
  - 1st – 74.6% — Steve Johnson, 1981 (235 of 315)
- Field Goal Percentage – Junior
  - 1st – 71.0% — Steve Johnson, 1980 (211 of 297)
- Total Rebounds (Single game)
  - 16th (tie) – 36 – Swede Halbrook vs. Idaho, Feb. 15, 1955
- Assists (Career)
  - 12th – 939 – Gary Payton, 1987–1990
- Average Assists Per Game (Career, min. 550 assists)
  - 9th – 7.82 – Gary Payton, 1987–1990
- Steals (Career)
  - 25th (tie) – 321 – Gary Payton, 1987–1990

Team Records

- Free-Throw Percentage (Single game, min. 30 free throws made)
  - 16th (tie) – 30–31 vs. Memphis, Dec. 19, 1990
- Steals (Single game)
  - 22nd (tie) – 27 vs. Hawaii-Loa, Dec. 22, 1985
- Field Goal Percentage (Season)
  - 3rd – 56.4% – 1981
  - 26th – 54.4% – 1980
- All-Time Victories (Min. 25 years in Division I)
  - 26th – 1,797 wins
- Games played vs. Single Opponent
  - 1st – 362 vs. Oregon
  - 3rd – 310 vs. Washington
  - 4th – 308 vs. Washington State
- Victories vs. Single Opponent
  - 2nd – 195 vs. Oregon
  - 6th – 176 vs. Washington State
