= Charlie Kraak =

American basketball player

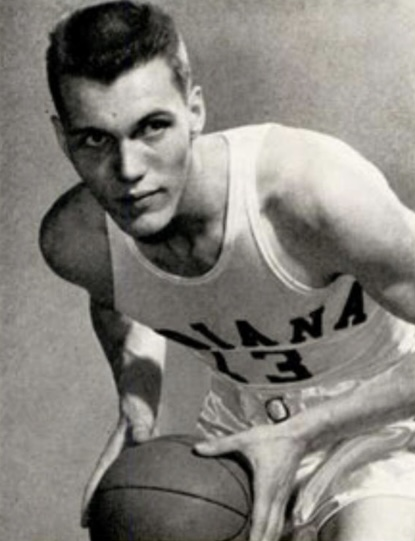
- Kraak as a senior at Indiana

Personal information
- Born: June 25, 1932 St. Louis, Missouri, U.S.
- Died: February 16, 2014 (aged 81) Summerfield, Florida, U.S.
- Listed height: 6 ft 5 in (1.96 m)

Career information
- High school: Collinsville (Collinsville, Illinois)
- College: Indiana (1951–1954)
- NBA draft: 1954: 6th round, 49th overall pick
- Drafted by: Fort Wayne Pistons
- Position: Power forward
- Number: 13

Career highlights
- NCAA champion (1953)
- Stats at Basketball Reference

Charles Frederick Kraak (June 25, 1932 – February 16, 2014) was an American basketball player, best known for his college career at Indiana University, where he was a starter on the school's 1953 NCAA championship team.

He was born in St. Louis, Missouri in 1932, and moved to Collinsville, Illinois, around 1940. Kraak, a 6'5" forward, became an All-state performer at Collinsville High School after growing six inches between his junior and senior years. He led Collinsville High to the Illinois state finals in his senior season. Indiana coach Branch McCracken recruited him to Indiana, where in his freshman season he came off the bench for a Hoosier team that went 16–6.

In his junior season, Kraak moved into the starting lineup at power forward alongside stars Don Schlundt and Bobby Leonard. Kraak averaged 7.2 points and 10.7 rebounds per game as was frequently referred to as "the best rebounder in the conference" by coach McCracken. The "Hurryin' Hoosiers", so named for their fast-paced style, won the 1953 NCAA championship, with Kraak scoring 17 points in the championship game against Kansas. In Kraak's senior season, the Hoosiers returned the bulk of their championship team. The team again won the Big Ten, but was eliminated in the regional semifinals by in state rival Notre Dame.

After graduation, Kraak was drafted by the Fort Wayne Pistons in the sixth round of the 1954 NBA draft (49th pick overall). He decided instead to join the U.S. Army, where he had a distinguished 30-year career. He was obtained a graduate degree from Michigan State University as well as degrees from the United States Army Command and General Staff College at Fort Leavenworth, Kansas, and the United States Army War College in Carlisle, Pennsylvania. Kraak died on February 16, 2014, at the age of 81.
