= 1953 NCAA basketball championship game =

1953 NCAA Tournament Championship Game
National championship game
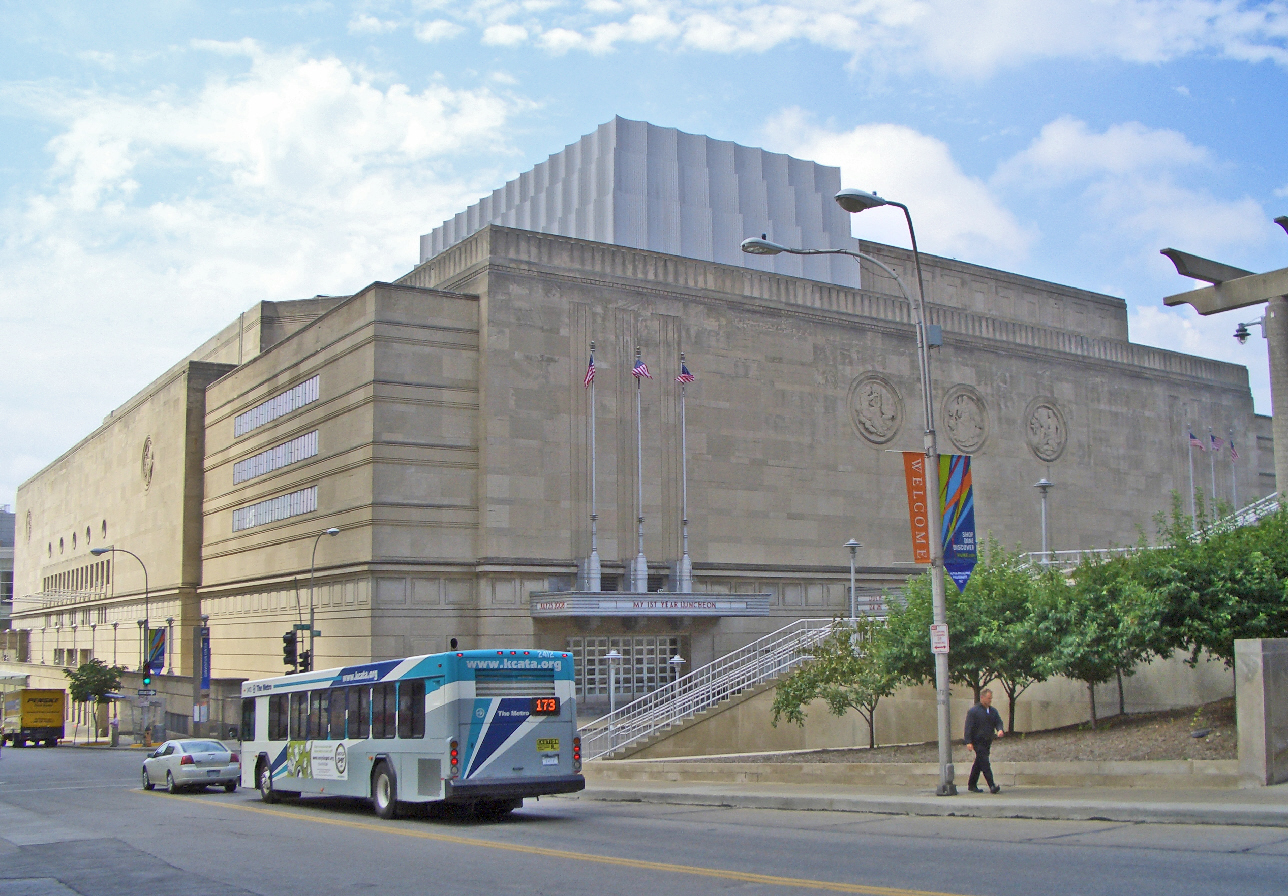
- The Municipal Auditorium in Kansas City, Missouri, hosted the championship game.
Kansas Jayhawks	Indiana Hoosiers
Big Seven	Big Ten
(19-5)	(22-3)
68	69
Head coach: Phog Allen	Head coach: Branch McCracken
- AP: 3
- Coaches: 5
- AP: 1
- Coaches: 1
	1st half	2nd half	Total
Kansas Jayhawks	41	27	68
Indiana Hoosiers	41	28	69
- Date: March 18, 1953
- Venue: Municipal Auditorium, Kansas City, Missouri
- MVP: B.H. Born, Kansas

The 1953 NCAA University Division Basketball Championship Game was the finals of the 1953 NCAA basketball tournament and it determined the national champion for the 1952-53 NCAA men's basketball season. The game was played on March 18, 1953, at Municipal Auditorium in Kansas City, Missouri. It featured the Indiana Hoosiers of the Big Ten Conference, and the defending national champion Kansas Jayhawks of the Big Seven Conference.

This was a rematch of the 1940 NCAA basketball championship game, which Indiana won, and the first national championship game rematch in tournament history, a phenomenon that has only repeated twice since, in 1962 and 2022.

== Participating teams ==
=== Kansas Jayhawks ===
- West-1
  - Kansas 73, Oklahoma City 65
  - Kansas 61, Oklahoma A&M 55
- Final Four
  - Kansas 79, Washington 53

=== Indiana Hoosiers ===
- East-2
  - Indiana 82, DePaul 80
  - Indiana 79, Notre Dame 66
- Final Four
  - Indiana 80, LSU 67

== Game summary ==
March 18, 1953

#1 Indiana Hoosiers 69, #3 Kansas Jayhawks 68
Scoring by half: 41-41, 28-27
Pts: Don Schlundt 30; Rebs: Charlie Kraak 13	Pts: B.H. Born 26; Rebs: B.H. Born 15

Municipal Auditorium, Kansas City, Missouri
