= 1952–53 Kansas Jayhawks men's basketball team =

American college basketball season

1952–53 Kansas Jayhawks men's basketball

NCAA tournament, Runner-up Big Seven Champions

National Championship Game, L 68-69 vs. Indiana
- Conference: Big Seven Conference

Ranking
- Coaches: No. 5
- AP: No. 3
- Record: 19–6 (10–2 Big 7)
- Head coach: Phog Allen (36th season)
- Assistant coach: Dick Harp (4th season)
- Captain: Dean Kelley
- Home arena: Hoch Auditorium

1952–53 Big Seven Conference men's basketball standings
| | Conf. | | | | Overall |
| Team | W | | L | PCT | W | | L | PCT |
|---|---|---|---|---|---|---|---|---|
| No. 3 Kansas | 10 | – | 2 | .833 | 19 | – | 6 | .760 |
| No. 12 Kansas State | 9 | – | 3 | .750 | 17 | – | 4 | .810 |
| Missouri | 6 | – | 6 | .500 | 11 | – | 9 | .550 |
| Iowa State | 5 | – | 7 | .417 | 10 | – | 11 | .476 |
| Oklahoma | 5 | – | 7 | .417 | 8 | – | 13 | .381 |
| Nebraska | 4 | – | 8 | .333 | 9 | – | 11 | .450 |
| Colorado | 3 | – | 9 | .250 | 10 | – | 11 | .476 |
Rankings from AP Poll

The 1952–53 Kansas Jayhawks men's basketball team represented the University of Kansas during the 1952–53 college men's basketball season.

== Roster ==
- B. H. Born
- Allen Kelley
- Dean Kelley
- Hal Patterson
- Gil Reich
- Larry Davenport
- Bill Heitholt
- Dean Smith
- Jerry Alberts
- Eldon Nicholson
- John Anderson
- LaVannes Squires
- Ken Buller
- Marvin Deckert
- Jerry Taylor
- Wes Whitney
- Jack Wolfe
- Everett Dye
- Wes Johnson

== Schedule ==
| Date time, TV | Rank^{#} | Opponent^{#} | Result | Record | Site city, state |
|---|---|---|---|---|---|
| December 10* | | at Tulane | W 63–50 | 1-0 | Avron B. Fogelman Arena; New Orleans, LA |
| December 13* | | at Rice | L 51–54 | 1-1 | Tudor Fieldhouse; Houston, TX |
| December 19* | No. 20 | SMU | W 83–66 | 2-1 | Hoch Auditorium; Lawrence, KS |
| December 20* | No. 20 | SMU | W 72–55 | 3-1 | Hoch Auditorium; Lawrence, KS |
| December 27 | | vs. Nebraska | W 73–66 | 4-1 | Municipal Auditorium; Kansas City, MO |
| December 29 | | vs. Missouri; Border War | W 66–62 | 5-1 | Municipal Auditorium; Kansas City, MO |
| December 30 | | vs. No. 1 Kansas State; Sunflower Showdown | L 87–93 | 5-2 | Municipal Auditorium; Kansas City, MO |
| January 5 | | at Oklahoma | L 61–76 | 5-3 (0-1) | Field House; Norman, OK |
| January 8* | | No. 5 Oklahoma A&M | W 65–53 | 6-3 | Hoch Auditorium; Lawrence, KS |
| January 10 | | at Iowa State | W 76–57 | 7-3 (1-1) | The Armory; Ames, IA |
| January 12 | | at Nebraska | W 65–59 | 8-3 (2-1) | Nebraska Coliseum; Lincoln, Nebraska |
| January 17 | No. 15 | No. 1 Kansas State | W 80–66 | 9-3 (3-1) | Hoch Auditorium; Lawrence, KS |
| January 20 | No. 9 | at Colorado | L 68–72 | 9-4 (3-2) | Balch Fieldhouse; Boulder, CO |
| February 7 | No. 18 | Missouri; Border War | W 86–62 | 10-4 (4-2) | Hoch Auditorium; Lawrence, KS |
| February 10 | No. 14 | Oklahoma | W 87–59 | 11-4 (5-2) | Hoch Auditorium; Lawrence, KS |
| February 14 | No. 14 | Nebraska | W 77–58 | 12-4 (6-2) | Hoch Auditorium; Lawrence, KS |
| February 17 | No. 10 | at No. 8 Kansas State; Sunflower Showdown | W 80–78 | 13-4 (7-2) | Ahearn Field House; Manhattan, KS |
| February 23* | No. 10 | at No. 7 Oklahoma A&M | L 58–79 | 13-5 | Gallagher-Iba Arena; Stillwater, OK |
| March 2 | | No. 5 Colorado | W 78–55 | 14-5 (8-2) | Hoch Auditorium; Lawrence, KS |
| March 6* | No. 6 | Iowa State | W 87–62 | 15-5 (9-2) | Hoch Auditorium; Lawrence, KS |
| March 9 | No. 6 | at Missouri; Border War | W 69–60 | 16-5 (10-2) | Brewer Fieldhouse; Columbia, MO |
| March 13* | No. 5 | vs. No. 10 Oklahoma City; NCAA Regional semifinals | W 73–65 | 17-5 | Ahearn Field House; Manhattan, KS |
| March 14* | No. 5 | vs. No. 6 Oklahoma A&M; NCAA Regional Finals | W 61–55 | 18-5 | Ahearn Field House; Manhattan, KS |
| March 17* | No. 5 | vs. No. 2 Washington; NCAA National Semifinals | W 79–53 | 19-5 | Municipal Auditorium; Kansas City, MO |
| March 18* | No. 5 | vs. No. 1 Indiana; National Championship game | L 68–69 | 19-6 | Municipal Auditorium; Kansas City, MO |
*Non-conference game. ^{#}Rankings from AP Poll. (#) Tournament seedings in parentheses.
