= 1952–53 Indiana Hoosiers men's basketball team =

American college basketball season

1952–53 Indiana Hoosiers men's basketball

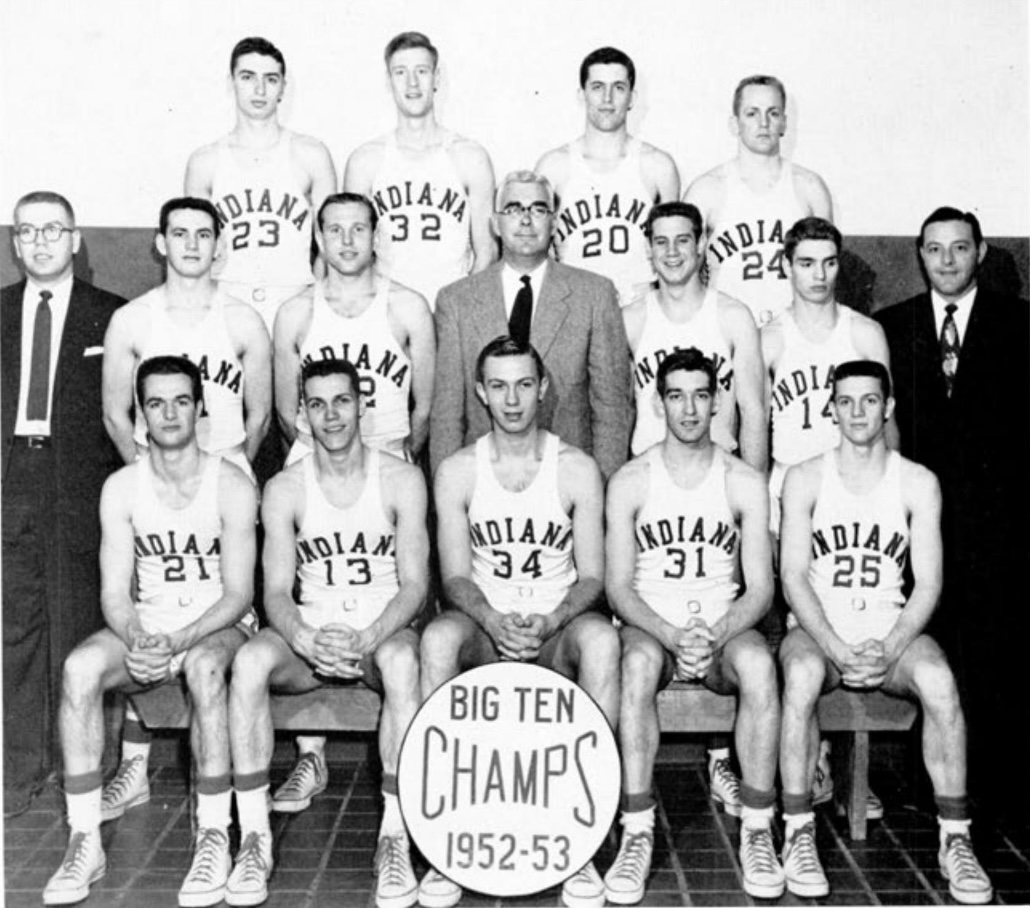

NCAA tournament National champions NCAA regular season champions Big Ten regular season champions

National Championship Game, W 69–68 vs. Kansas
- Conference: Big Ten Conference

Ranking
- Coaches: No. 1
- AP: No. 1
- Record: 23–3 (17–1 Big Ten)
- Head coach: Branch McCracken (12th season)
- Assistant coach: Ernie Andres
- Captain: Bobby Leonard
- Home arena: The Fieldhouse

1952–53 Big Ten Conference men's basketball standings
	Conf.				Overall
Team	W		L	PCT	W		L	PCT
No. 1 Indiana	17	–	1	.944	23	–	3	.885
No. 11 Illinois	14	–	4	.778	18	–	4	.818
Minnesota	11	–	7	.611	14	–	8	.636
Michigan State	11	–	7	.611	13	–	9	.591
Wisconsin	10	–	8	.556	13	–	9	.591
Iowa	9	–	9	.500	12	–	10	.545
Ohio State	7	–	11	.389	10	–	12	.455
Northwestern	5	–	13	.278	6	–	16	.273
Michigan	3	–	15	.167	6	–	16	.273
Purdue	3	–	15	.167	4	–	18	.182
Rankings from AP Poll

The 1952–53 Indiana Hoosiers men's basketball team represented Indiana University. Their head coach was Branch McCracken, who was in his 12th year. A member of the Big Ten Conference, they played home games on campus in The Fieldhouse in Bloomington, Indiana.

The Hoosiers finished the regular season with an overall record of 23–3 and a conference record of 17–1, first in the standings. As Big Ten champion, Indiana was invited the 22-team NCAA tournament, and advanced to the championship game in Kansas City. IU beat defending champion Kansas by a point for their second national title.

== Roster ==
No.	Name	Position	Ht.	Year	Hometown
13	Charlie Kraak	F	6–5	Jr.	Collinsville, Illinois
14	Phil Byers	G	5–11	So.	Evansville, Indiana
14	James Fields	F	6–1	So.	Andrews, Indiana
15	William Ditius	F	6–1	So.	Mount Pulaski, Illinois
19	Jim Schooley	C	6–5	Sr.	Auburn, Indiana
20	Goethe Chambers	F	6–3	So.	Union City, Indiana
21	Bobby Leonard	G	6–3	Jr.	Terre Haute, Indiana
22	Jim DeaKyne	G	6–3	Jr.	Fortville, Indiana
23	Ron Taylor	F	6–3	Jr.	Chicago
24	Jack Wright	F	5–10	Jr.	New Castle, Indiana
25	Burke Scott	G	6–1	So.	Tell City, Indiana
30	Paul Poff	G	6–1	So.	New Albany, Indiana
31	Dick Farley	F	6–3	Jr.	Winslow, Indiana
33	Dick Hendricks	C	6–5	Jr.	Auburn, Indiana
34	Don Schlundt	C	6–10	So.	South Bend, Indiana
35	Lou Scott	C	6–10	Jr.	Chicago
41	Dick White	F	6–1	So.	Terre Haute, Indiana
42	Don Henry	F	6–2	So.	Evansville, Indiana

== Schedule/results ==
Date time, TV	Rank^{#}	Opponent^{#}	Result	Record	Site city, state
Regular season
12/1/1952*		Valparaiso	W 95–56	1–0	The Fieldhouse; Bloomington, Indiana
12/6/1952*		at Notre Dame	L 70–71	1–1	Notre Dame Fieldhouse; Notre Dame, Indiana
12/13/1952*		at Kansas State	L 80–82	1–2	Ahearn Field House; Manhattan, Kansas
12/20/1952	No. 19	Michigan	W 88–60	2–2 (1–0)	The Fieldhouse; Bloomington, Indiana
12/22/1952	No. 19	Iowa	W 91–72	3–2 (2–0)	The Fieldhouse; Bloomington, Indiana
1/3/1953	No. 12	at Michigan	W 91–88	4–2 (3–0)	Yost Field House; Ann Arbor, Michigan
1/5/1953	No. 12	at Michigan State	W 69–62	5–2 (4–0)	Jenison Fieldhouse; East Lansing, Michigan
1/10/1953	No. 7	No. 19 Minnesota	W 66–63	6–2 (5–0)	The Fieldhouse; Bloomington, Indiana
1/12/1953	No. 7	at Ohio State	W 88–68	7–2 (6–0)	Ohio Expo Center Coliseum; Columbus, Ohio
1/17/1953	No. 6	No. 4 Illinois; Rivalry	W 74–70 ^{2OT}	8–2 (7–0)	The Fieldhouse; Bloomington, Indiana
1/19/1953	No. 6	at Purdue; Rivalry	W 88–75	9–2 (8–0)	Lambert Fieldhouse; West Lafayette, Indiana
2/2/1953*	No. 2	Butler	W 105–70	10–2	The Fieldhouse; Bloomington, Indiana
2/7/1953	No. 2	at Northwestern	W 88–64	11–2 (9–0)	Welsh-Ryan Arena; Evanston, Illinois
2/9/1953	No. 2	Wisconsin	W 66–48	12–2 (10–0)	The Fieldhouse; Bloomington, Indiana
2/14/1953	No. 2	Michigan State	W 65–50	13–2 (11–0)	The Fieldhouse; Bloomington, Indiana
2/16/1953	No. 2	at Wisconsin	W 72–70	14–2 (12–0)	Wisconsin Field House; Madison, Wisconsin
2/21/1953	No. 2	Ohio State	W 81–67	15–2 (13–0)	The Fieldhouse; Bloomington, Indiana
2/23/1953	No. 2	Purdue; Rivalry	W 113–78	16–2 (14–0)	The Fieldhouse; Bloomington, Indiana
2/28/1953	No. 2	at No. 10 Illinois; Rivalry	W 91–79	17–2 (15–0)	Huff Hall; Champaign, Illinois
3/2/1953	No. 2	Northwestern	W 90–88 ^{OT}	18–2 (16–0)	The Fieldhouse; Bloomington, Indiana
3/7/1953	No. 1	at Minnesota	L 63–65	18–3 (16–1)	Williams Arena; Minneapolis
3/9/1953	No. 1	Iowa	W 68–61	19–3 (17–1)	The Fieldhouse; Bloomington, Indiana
NCAA tournament
3/13/1953*	No. 1	vs. DePaul; Regional semifinals	W 82–80	20–3	Chicago Stadium; Chicago
3/14/1953*	No. 1	vs. No. 17 Notre Dame; Regional Finals	W 79–66	21–3	Chicago Stadium; Chicago
3/17/1953*	No. 1	vs. No. 7 LSU; Final Four - Semifinal	W 80–67	22–3	Municipal Auditorium; Kansas City, Missouri
3/18/1953*	No. 1	vs. No. 5 Kansas; National Championship	W 69–68	23–3	Municipal Auditorium; Kansas City, Missouri
*Non-conference game. ^{#}Rankings from AP Poll. (#) Tournament seedings in parentheses.

== NBA draft ==
Year	Round	Pick	Player	NBA club
1954	2	10	Bobby Leonard	Baltimore Bullets
1954	2	15	Dick Farley	Syracuse Nationals
1954	5	37	Lou Scott	Baltimore Bullets
1954	6	49	Charlie Kraak	Fort Wayne Pistons
1955	2	14	Don Schlundt	Syracuse Nationals
