= Rinso Marquette =

College men's basketball coach

Biographical details
- Born: October 3, 1924; Shamokin, Pennsylvania, U.S.
- Died: November 15, 2008 (aged 84); Lebanon, Pennsylvania, U.S.
- Education: Lebanon Valley College; Columbia; Temple

Coaching career (HC unless noted)
- 1952-1960: Lebanon Valley

Head coaching record
- Overall: 101–76 (.571)
- Tournaments: NCAA: 1-1 (.500)

George Reynolds "Rinso" Marquette (October 3, 1924 – November 15, 2008) was an American college men's basketball coach and college student affairs administrator. He was the head coach of Lebanon Valley College from 1952 to 1960. He coached Lebanon Valley to a 101-76 record, making one NCAA tournament appearance. He also served as a student affairs administrator at Lebanon Valley after the conclusion of his coaching career until his retirement in 1990.

In 1942 he graduated from Shamokin High School, where he was captain of the basketball team and student leader of the high school band.

He earned scholarships in music and athletics to Lebanon Valley College in Annville Township, Pennsylvania.

He enlisted in the US Army on 15 Feb 1943, serving in the European Theater as a radio operator/gunner in the Army Air Corps, flying 34 missions in B-17s and one in a B-24. He was awarded the Air Medal with three Oak Leaf Clusters.

He resumed his studies at Lebanon Valley College in February 1945, graduating in spring 1948.

Following graduation, he became a history teacher and coach at Myerstown High School.

He also played Minor League Baseball, finishing as a player/coach in Panama City, Florida in 1954.

Coach Marquette's 1952-53 team defeated Fordham 80-67 in the first round of the 1953 NCAA basketball tournament. They lost their next game, 83-67, to LSU, led by All American and future Hall of Fame forward Bob Pettit.

== Head coaching record ==
Record table
Season	Team	Overall	Conference	Standing	Postseason
Lebanon Valley Dutchmen (Independent) (1952–1960)
1952–53	Lebanon Valley	20-3			NCAA Sweet Sixteen
1953–54	Lebanon Valley	19-6			
1954–55	Lebanon Valley	19-5			
1955–56	Lebanon Valley	13-8			
1956–57	Lebanon Valley	9-13			
1957–58	Lebanon Valley	4-16			
1958–59	Lebanon Valley	6-16			
1959–60	Lebanon Valley	11-9			
Lebanon Valley:		101–76 (.571)			
Total:		101–76 (.571)			
National champion Postseason invitational champion Conference regular season champion Conference regular season and conference tournament champion Division regular season champion Division regular season and conference tournament champion Conference tournament champion
