= Indiana Hoosiers men's basketball =

Indiana University Bloomington basketball team

2026–27 Indiana Hoosiers men's basketball team
- University: Indiana University Bloomington
- First season: 1900–01; 126 years ago
- Athletic director: Scott Dolson
- Head coach: Darian DeVries; 2nd season, 24–14 (.632)
- Location: Bloomington, Indiana
- Arena: Simon Skjodt Assembly Hall (capacity: 17,222)
- NCAA division: Division I
- Conference: Big Ten
- Nickname: Hoosiers
- Colors: Crimson and cream
- Student section: Crimson Guard
- All-time record: 1,974–1,144 (.633)
- NCAA tournament record: 68–36 (.654)

NCAA Division I tournament champions
- 1940, 1953, 1976, 1981, 1987
Other NCAA Division I tournament results
Runner-up	2002
Third place	1973
Final Four	1940, 1953, 1973, 1976, 1981, 1987, 1992, 2002
Elite Eight	1940, 1953, 1973, 1975, 1976, 1981, 1984, 1987, 1992, 1993, 2002
Sweet Sixteen	1953, 1954, 1958, 1967, 1973, 1975, 1976, 1978, 1980, 1981, 1983, 1984, 1987, 1989, 1991, 1992, 1993, 1994, 2002, 2012, 2013, 2016
Appearances	1940, 1953, 1954, 1958, 1967, 1973, 1975, 1976, 1978, 1980, 1981, 1982, 1983, 1984, 1986, 1987, 1988, 1989, 1990, 1991, 1992, 1993, 1994, 1995, 1996, 1997, 1998, 1999, 2000, 2001, 2002, 2003, 2006, 2007, 2008, 2012, 2013, 2015, 2016, 2022, 2023

NIT champions
- 1979

Conference regular-season champions
- Big Ten: 1926, 1928, 1936, 1953, 1954, 1957, 1958, 1967, 1973, 1974, 1975, 1976, 1980, 1981, 1983, 1987, 1989, 1991, 1993, 2002, 2013, 2016

CCAT champions
- 1974

Uniforms
Home	Away

The Indiana Hoosiers men's basketball team represents Indiana University Bloomington in NCAA Division I college basketball and competes in the Big Ten Conference. The Hoosiers play at Simon Skjodt Assembly Hall on the Branch McCracken Court in Bloomington, Indiana, on the Indiana University Bloomington campus. Indiana has won five National Championships in men's basketball (1940, 1953, 1976, 1981, 1987) – two coming under Branch McCracken and three under Bob Knight. Indiana's 1976 team remains the last undefeated NCAA men's basketball champion.

The Hoosiers have 41 NCAA Tournament appearances and 68 victories, 8 Final Four appearances, and 22 Big Ten Conference Championship victories. A 2025 study listed Indiana as the third most valuable collegiate basketball program in the country. Indiana has ranked in the top 20 nationally in men's basketball attendance since 1972.

Indiana has two main rivalries including in-state, against the Purdue Boilermakers (see Indiana–Purdue rivalry), and out-of-state, against the Kentucky Wildcats (see Indiana–Kentucky rivalry). The Hoosiers also have a rivalry with the Illinois Fighting Illini (see Illinois–Indiana rivalry).

== Traditions ==
=== Candy striped warm-up pants ===
During warm-ups, Indiana players wear "candy striped" pants resembling the red and white stripes of a candy cane.

=== Simple game jerseys ===
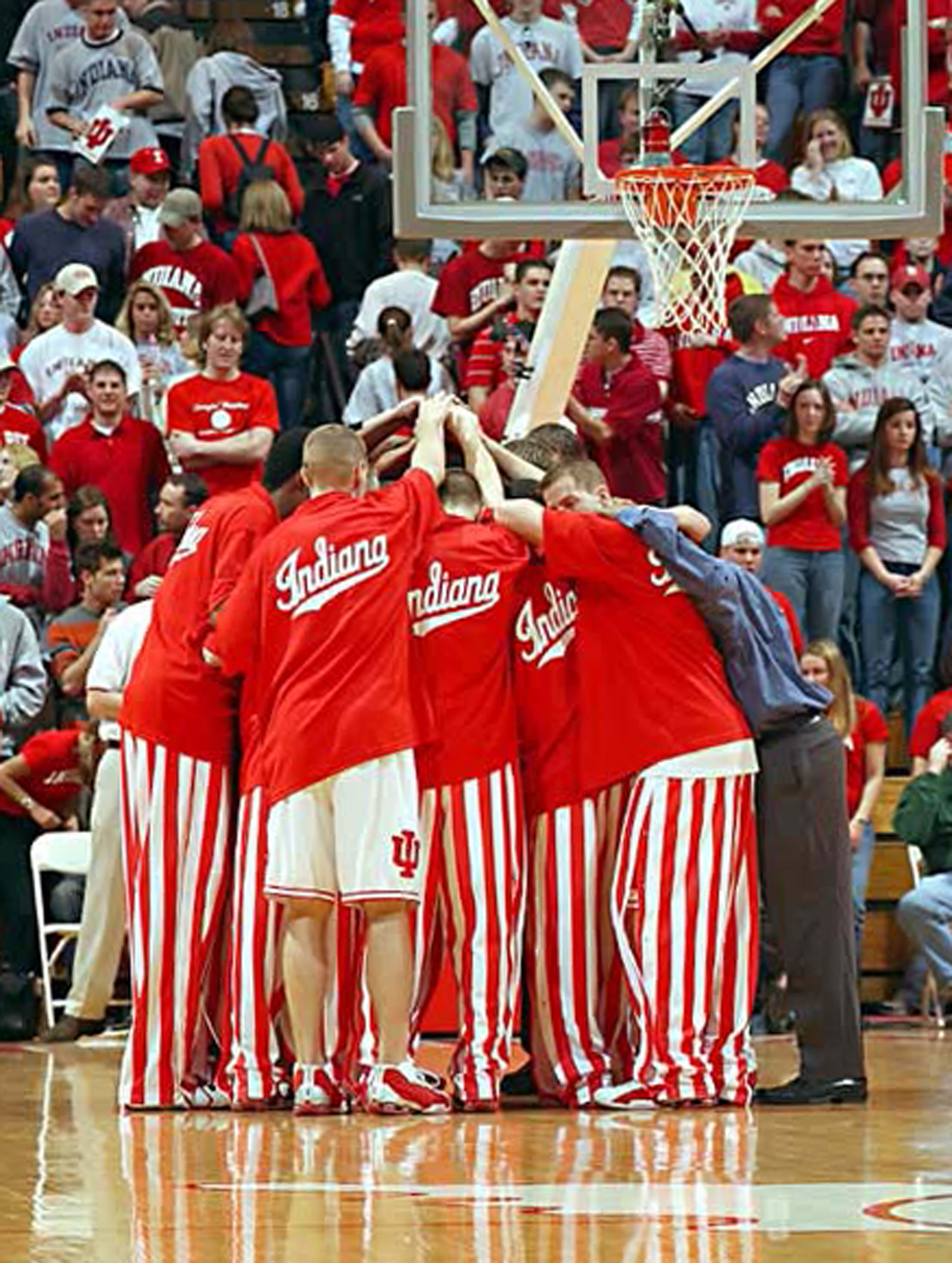
Players huddle before a game in their iconic candy striped pants

The team is widely noted for its simple game jerseys. When coach Mike Davis succeeded Bob Knight, he suggested adding names to the jerseys. However, the Hoosiers' minimalist look had become such a part of the program's brand that the proposal was dropped after considerable backlash from fans. Despite the long tradition behind the jerseys, they have undergone some slight changes over the years. The school's colors are cream and crimson.

=== William Tell Overture ===
The Indiana Big Red Basketball Band performs the William Tell Overture. Indiana Assistant Director for Facilities, Chuck Crabb, said the tradition began in 1979 or 1980. Sportscaster "Billy Packer [called it] the greatest college timeout in the country."

=== "Mop Lady" advertisement ===
In 1971, Indiana Farm Bureau Insurance became the sole sponsor of Indiana and Purdue games on WTTV. In 2009 new coach Tom Crean resurrected the tradition and had "Martha" appear at the "Midnight Madness" festivities to begin the season. Because Webster was unavailable, singer Sheila Stephen stepped in as the new Martha. Starting with the 2010–11 season, video of the original ad was shown at home games after the National Anthem and right before tip off.

== History ==
=== Early years (1900–1924) ===
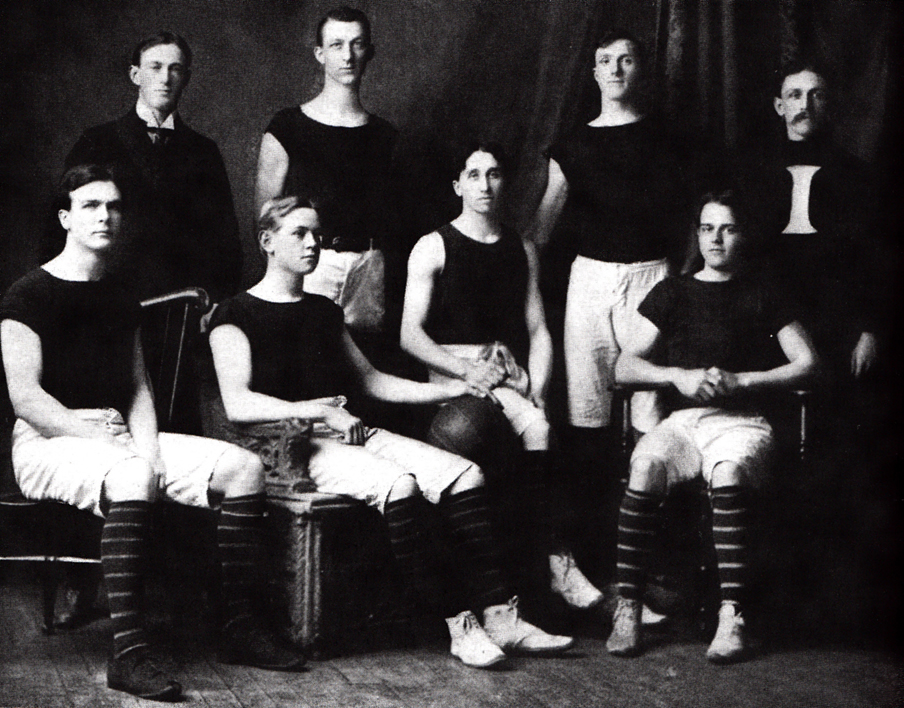
The first Indiana basketball team (1900–01)

Indiana fielded its first men's basketball team in the 1900–01 season, posting a 1–4 ledger under coach James H. Horne. Their first game was in Indianapolis, where the Hoosiers lost to Butler 20–17. Indiana's first victory was a 26–17 win over Wabash College that same year.

The Indiana Hoosiers began playing in the Men's Gymnasium in 1917. Due to complaints from spectators seated behind the backboards about poor visibility, the arena installed glass backboards a few years later. These glass backboards may have been the first to be used in the United States.

=== Everett Dean era (1924–1938) ===
In 1924, Indiana alumnus Everett Dean became head coach. The Hoosiers won their first Big Ten Conference title in 1926, defeating Wisconsin 35–20, and won again in 1928 and 1936.

=== Branch McCracken era (1938–1965) ===
When Dean left for Stanford, the popular selection to succeed him was Branch McCracken. McCracken was another young alumnus and former player under Everett Dean.

McCracken's first IU team was led by All-American Ernie Andres, later a McCracken basketball assistant. In McCracken's first year, the team finished 17–3, splitting games with both Purdue and eventual NCAA runner-up Ohio State. The following year the 1939–40 NCAA title team, led by All-American Marvin Huffman, would take Indiana to unprecedented success: an NCAA title and a record (at the time) 20 wins. The 20–3 record by that team would not be bested for another 13 years until broken again by Indiana. At their home court at The Fieldhouse, Indiana saw six perfect seasons including a 24-game unbeaten home winning streak from 1938 to 1941.

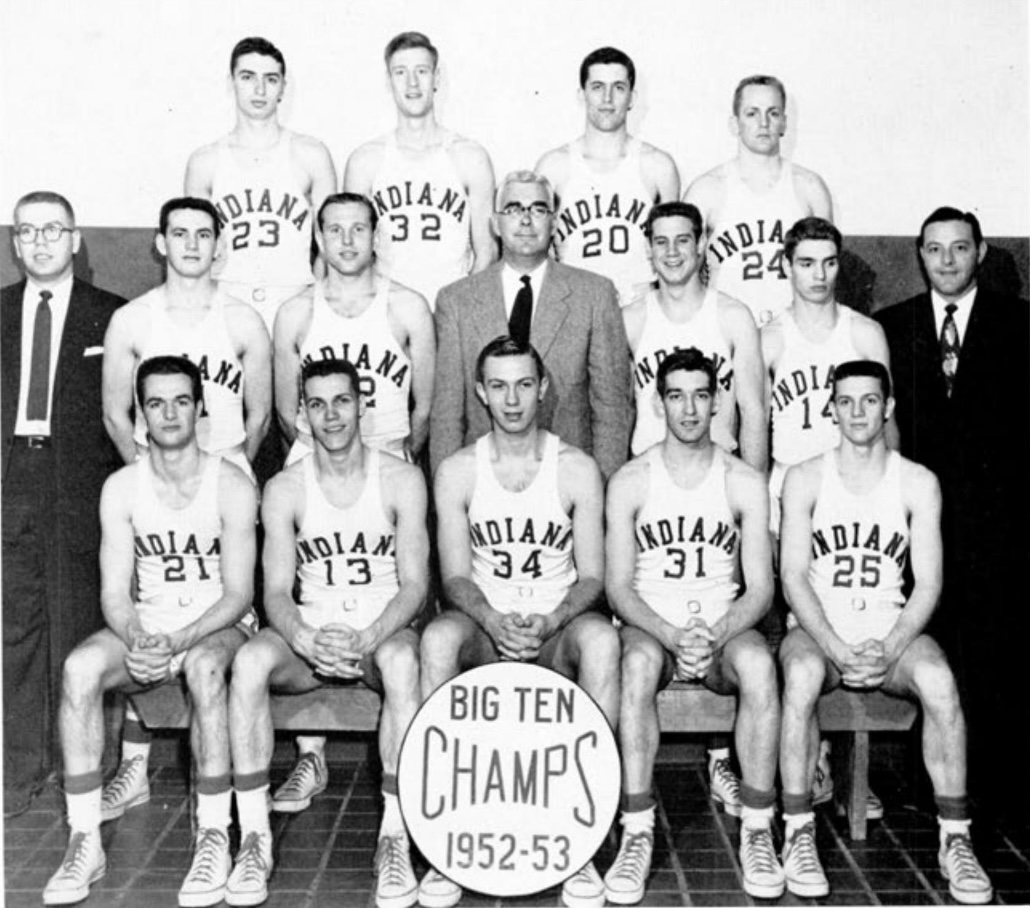
The 1952–53 National champion Indiana Hoosiers

In 1960 the Indiana Hoosiers football program was hit with devastating NCAA sanctions that impacted every varsity sport at the school, including basketball. The violations only occurred within the football program. Nevertheless, McCracken did manage to successfully recruit twins Dick Van Arsdale and Tom Van Arsdale, both of whom would earn All-America honors in 1965.

McCracken ultimately coached IU for 23 years, amassing 364 wins and 210 Big Ten wins. His teams also won four regular season Big Ten titles and went to the NCAA tournament four times, winning two national titles. He was inducted into the National Basketball Hall of Fame and the court now at Assembly Hall is named in his honor.

=== Lou Watson era (1965–1971) ===
Sandwiched between two iconic coaches in Branch McCracken and Bob Knight, McCracken's longtime assistant and former lead scorer Lou Watson coached Indiana from 1965 through 1971, with a leave of absence in 1970 where Jerry Oliver stepped in as acting head coach. The 1966–67 team, which won a Big Ten championship, was known as the "Cardiac Kids" because of their many heart-stopping finishes.

=== Bob Knight era (1971–2000) ===
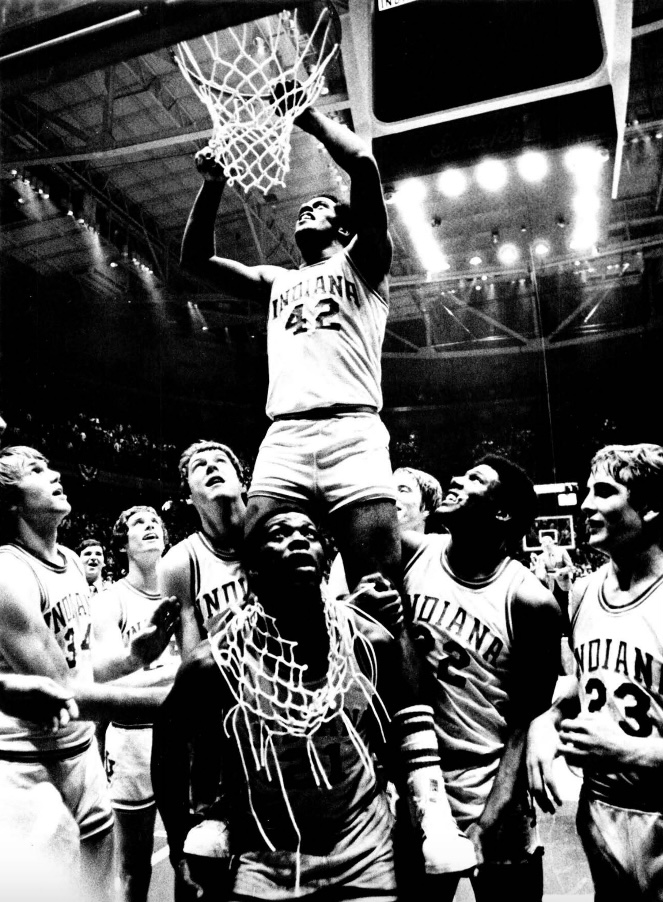
All-American Scott May cuts down the nets after winning the 1976 NCAA championship.

In 1972–73, Bob Knight's second year as coach, Indiana won the Big Ten championship and reached the Final Four, but lost to UCLA. Indiana won the Big Ten championship again in the following season. In the two following seasons, 1974–75 and 1975–76, the Hoosiers were undefeated in the regular season and won 37-consecutive Big Ten games, including two more Big Ten championships. The 1974–75 Hoosiers swept the entire Big Ten by an average of 22.8 points per game. However, in an 83–82 win against Purdue they lost consensus All-American forward Scott May to a broken left arm. With May's injury keeping him to 7 minutes of play, the No. 1 Hoosiers lost to Kentucky 92–90 in the Mideast Regional. The Hoosiers were so dominant that four starters – Scott May, Steve Green, Kent Benson and Quinn Buckner – would make the five-man All-Big Ten team. The following season, 1975–76, the Hoosiers went the entire season and 1976 NCAA tournament without a single loss, beating Michigan 86–68 in the title game. Indiana remains the last school to accomplish this feat.

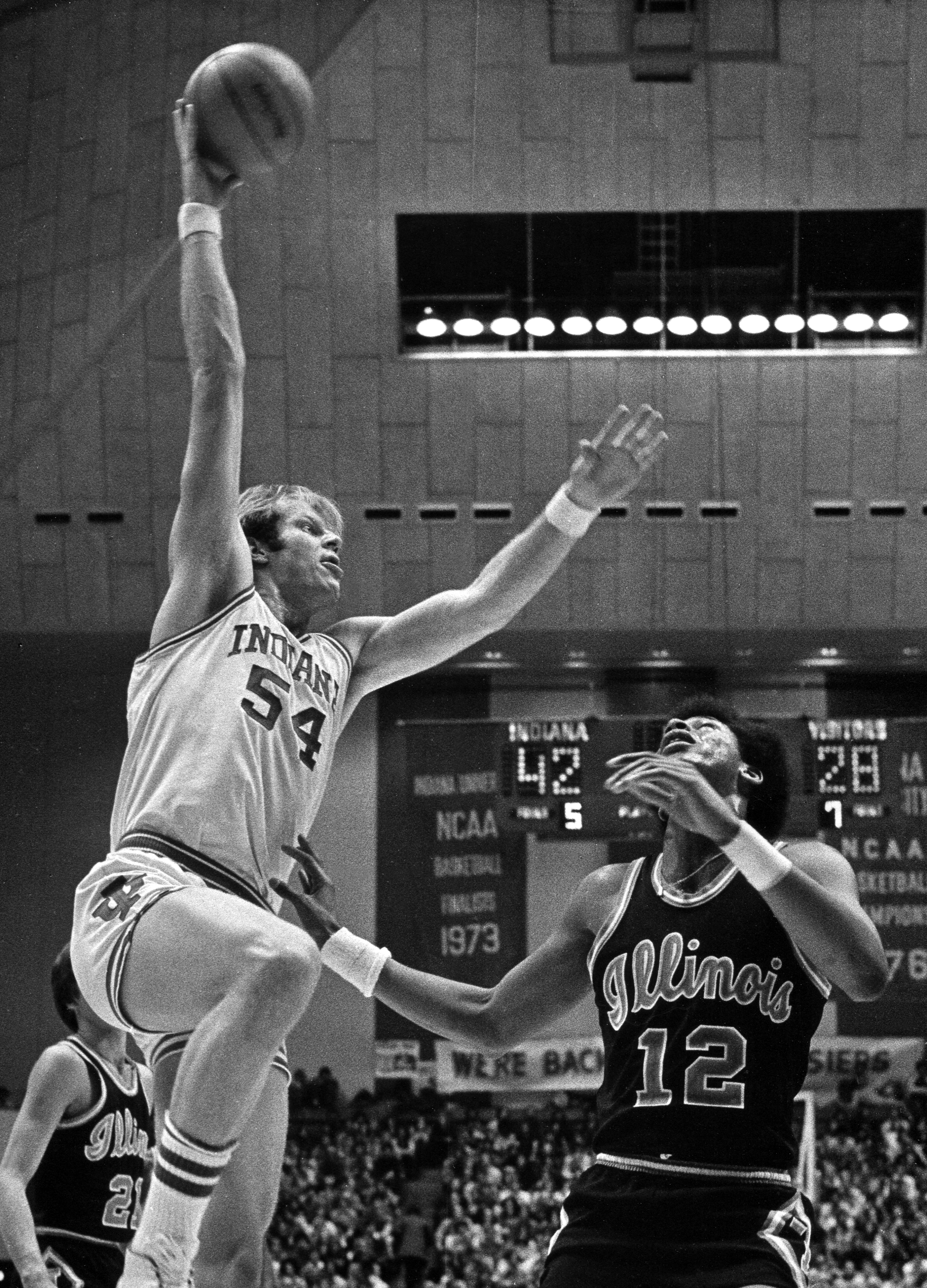
Kent Benson of the 1976 NCAA Championship team scoring in a Big Ten game against Illinois in 1977

The 1985–86 Hoosiers were profiled in a best-selling book A Season on the Brink. To write it Knight granted author John Feinstein almost unprecedented access to the Indiana basketball program, as well as insights into Knight's private life. The following season, in 1986–87, the Hoosiers were led by All-American Steve Alford and captured a share of the Big Ten title. The team won Indiana's fifth national championship against Syracuse in the 1987 NCAA tournament with a game-winning jump shot by Keith Smart with five seconds of play remaining in the championship game. In the 1988–1989 season the Hoosiers were led by All-American Jay Edwards and won a Big Ten championship.

Throughout the mid and late 1990s Knight and the Hoosiers continued to experience success with superior play from All-Americans Brian Evans and A. J. Guyton. The Hoosiers won a minimum of 19 games and played in the NCAA tournament each year. However, 1993 would be Knight's last conference championship and 1994 would be his last trip to the Sweet Sixteen. Moreover, his aggressive and combative actions and communication often brought as much controversy to the school as success. Allegations of abuse, along with his reputation and a strained relationship with then-University President Myles Brand, resulted in Knight's controversial dismissal in 2000.

=== Mike Davis era (2000–2006) ===
Following Bob Knight's tumultuous exit from Indiana, assistant Mike Davis took over as interim head coach in the fall of 2000. In his first season, Davis led a team featuring All-Americans Kirk Haston and Jared Jeffries to a 21–13 record. The following year, in the 2001–02 season, Davis was named the permanent coach. That year the Hoosiers captured a share of the Big Ten championship and made an unexpected trip to the 2002 NCAA championship game. After the Hoosiers lost to Maryland in 2002 and failed to make the NCAA tournament in 2004 and 2005 (for the first time since 1985), criticism of Davis grew. Following months of speculation, he announced his resignation in February 2006, saying the basketball program needed to move on with a new coach. He remained with the team for the rest of the 2006 season before leaving.

=== Kelvin Sampson era (2006–2008) ===
On March 28, 2006, Oklahoma head coach Kelvin Sampson was named coach of the Hoosiers, despite a history of violating NCAA rules and sanctions imposed on him. Sampson fielded competitive teams and scored a major recruiting victory by persuading in-state star Eric Gordon to sign with Indiana. The Hoosiers, with Gordon and forward D.J. White, were considered one of the better teams during the 2007–2008 season. However, in October 2007 Sampson was found to have violated rules again, this time by engaging in a 3-way phone conversation with a recruit. Indiana punished Sampson by denying him a previously scheduled $500,000 raise, firing one of his assistant coaches, and taking away one of his scholarships for the 2008–2009 season.

In early February 2008 the NCAA informed Indiana that Sampson had "knowingly violated telephone recruiting restrictions and then lied about it." After launching another internal investigation, Indiana officials announced just 14 days later that Sampson accepted a $750,000 buyout of his contract and resigned as the men's basketball coach. Former player and assistant coach Dan Dakich was named interim coach for the remainder of the season. A number of college basketball pundits believed that Sampson's tenure at Indiana had effectively ended once the allegations broke. Sports Illustrated college basketball columnist Seth Davis noted that the NCAA had given Indiana 90 days to respond to the notice of allegations. Indiana officials said their internal investigation would only take a week, leading Davis to believe that they had already decided Sampson was guilty. ESPN's Mark Schlabach suggested that the only reason Indiana did not fire Sampson right away was because his contract did not allow the school to suspend him immediately. He believed Indiana was trying to find a way not to honor his contract and stay out of the courtroom. ESPN's Pat Forde said that Sampson's departure was "preordained" the moment the NCAA sent out its notice of allegations, and suggested that Sampson would never return to Division I.

In November 2008, the NCAA imposed a three-year probation on the basketball program and upheld the school's self-imposed sanctions stemming from the actions of Sampson and his staff. Earlier, IU president Michael McRobbie privately told the NCAA infractions committee that Sampson betrayed his trust as Indiana's coach, and demonstrated that his hiring had been "a risk that should not have been taken."

=== Tom Crean era (2008–2017) ===
On April 1, 2008, Marquette head coach Tom Crean was hired as head coach and inherited a thoroughly depleted team. Between Crean's hiring and the start of the 2008–09 season, freshman Eric Gordon opted to leave early for the NBA and star forward DJ White graduated. Two other players transferred, one player was dismissed from the team and two others previously dismissed by Dakich were not allowed to return. As a result, Crean began with a roster consisting of two walk-ons who had scored a combined 36 points in their careers. Crean's first three seasons saw losing records of 6–25 (the worst in school history), 10–21, and 12–20.

The 2011–2012 season was a watershed one for Crean and the program. The arrival of Indiana Mr. Basketball Cody Zeller brought higher expectations for year four. The team earned wins over the #1 ranked Kentucky, the #2 ranked Ohio State, and #5 ranked Michigan State. This made Indiana the first Big 10 program to knock off the #1 and #2 ranked teams in the same season since 1991 and the first IU squad ever to defeat three programs ranked in the top five in the regular season. The Hoosiers finished the season with a 27–9 record, 5th in the Big Ten. The fifteen game win improvement in 2011–2012 was the largest single turnaround in the NCAA that season. Crean's guidance of the program to success from "unthinkable depths" was regarded as one of the most remarkable rebuilding projects in NCAA basketball history. The Hoosiers advanced to the Sweet Sixteen in the 2012 NCAA tournament before losing a rematch game to Kentucky, who would go on to win the national championship. Following the surprise run to the Sweet Sixteen, the 2012–2013 Hoosiers spent 10 weeks ranked No. 1 in the country, and all but two weeks in the top 5. The experience of Jordan Hulls and Christian Watford, alongside the talent of Victor Oladipo, Cody Zeller and freshman point guard Yogi Ferrell, led this team to a finish of outright Big Ten regular season champions for the first time since 2002. They again advanced to the Sweet Sixteen, the first time since the 1992–93 and 1993–94 seasons that the Hoosiers advanced to the Sweet Sixteen in back-to-back seasons. As national player of the year, Oladipo and Zeller both left for the NBA after the conclusion of the season.

After a rough start, the 2015–2016 Hoosiers finished the season 27–8 overall and 15–3 in the Big Ten to win the Big Ten regular season title outright. They received the #1 seed in the 2016 Big Ten men's basketball tournament, where they made an early quarterfinals exit. As Big Ten Conference Champions, the Hoosiers received an at-large bid to the NCAA tournament and beat Chattanooga and Kentucky to advance to the Sweet 16 for the third time in five years; however, they fell to North Carolina in the next round. Despite the highs of the previous season and being ranked as high as #3 in the nation, the 2016–2017 team faced a troubling and disappointing year; they finished 18–16 overall and 7–11 in Big Ten play. After tying for tenth in the Big Ten, the Hoosiers missed out on the NCAA tournament and lost in the first round of the NIT, their first appearance since 2005. On March 16, 2017, the Indiana Hoosiers Athletic's Department fired coach Tom Crean. He ended his tenure with the Hoosiers with an overall record of 166–135 (.551), three Sweet Sixteen appearances, and two regular season conference championships.

=== Archie Miller era (2017–2021) ===
On March 27, 2017, Dayton head coach Archie Miller was named the 29th head coach in the history of the men's basketball program. Miller's first season was a major remodeling job, starting with laying the foundation of a pack-line defense and valuing possessions. Early in the season, Miller stated practices were 75% defense, 25% offense. That scheme showed early and often, as the Hoosiers struggled mightily throughout the season to find any flow or rhythm on offense, despite the defense making leaps and bounds in the overall rankings of Division 1 basketball. With a surprising early second round loss in the 2018 Big Ten tournament to Rutgers, 76–67, and losing enough games to keep them out of both the NCAA tournament and NIT, including games in which they were favored, such as Indiana State and Fort Wayne, IU's first season under their new coach came to a disappointing close. They finished with an overall record of 16–15 and 9–9 in the Big Ten.

In 2018, Miller landed his first five star recruit when Romeo Langford committed to Indiana University. Langford, a McDonald's-All American and 2018 Indiana Mr. Basketball, was (according to ESPN) the 6th ranked player in the nation and number one high school player in Indiana. Despite getting off to a strong start of 12–2, which included 3 conference wins, the 2018–2019 Hoosiers struggled down the backstretch of the season. Riddled with injuries and the inability to shoot, IU lost 12 of 13 games before turning things around and finishing the regular season with a 4-game winning streak. Having put themselves back into the conversation for making the NCAA tournament for the first time in 3 years, the Hoosiers looked to knock off Ohio State in the Big Ten tournament. However, the Hoosiers fell short and lost to Ohio State, 79–75. IU was deemed one of the Last Four Out in the NCAA tournament, so they earned 1-seed in the NIT, where they advanced to the quarterfinals before losing to Wichita State, 73–63. Thus, the Hoosiers' 119th season ended with an overall record of 19–16 and 8–12 in the Big Ten. The Hoosiers started off another strong campaign for the 2019–2020 season by going 11–1 before dropping back-to-back games in late December 2019 and early January 2020. During the bulk of the conference season, IU was able to win most of their home games (7–3), while stealing a few road games (2–8) to end their final season with an overall record of 20–12 and a conference record of 9–11. Indiana entered the Big Ten tournament as the 11-seed where they faced the 14-seeded Nebraska Cornhuskers. The first round matchup ended in an 89–64 IU victory, staging a second round matchup with 6-seed Penn State. However, on the morning of March 12, 2020, the Big Ten Conference announced that it would be cancelling the remaining tournament games due to the COVID-19 pandemic. Following suit, that afternoon, the NCAA announced that it was cancelling all winter and spring championships. This announcement officially, and abruptly, ended the Hoosiers' season, where they were expected to make the NCAA tournament for the first time in 4 years.

The 2020–21 season was another disappointing one as the Hoosiers finished the regular season 12–15 overall, 7–12 in the Big Ten. Indiana closed out the season on a 6-game losing streak, leaving them out of the NCAA and NIT tournaments. On March 15, 2021, Indiana University officially parted ways with Miller and began its search for the next men's head basketball coach.

=== Mike Woodson era (2021–2025) ===
Just shy of two weeks after Archie Miller was fired, Indiana University announced on March 28, 2021, that former Indiana standout Mike Woodson would become the 30th head coach of the IU basketball program. In addition, former Ohio State head coach, Thad Matta, was hired on to be an associate athletic director in men's basketball administration. This was Woodson's first coaching job in the college ranks, having previously served as head coach for the Atlanta Hawks and New York Knicks, serving as an assistant coach for the latter team when IU hired him.

Coach Woodson's first season at the helm saw a list of streaks come to an end for the Hoosiers. Indiana finished the season 21–14 overall, and 9–11 in conference play. Along the way, IU ended losing streaks to Purdue, Michigan, and Illinois. as the No. 9 seed, they also advanced to the semifinals of the Big Ten Conference tournament, something they had not done since 2013. They lost to Iowa, 80–77, the eventual tournament champions. The Hoosiers also heard their name called on Selection Sunday for the first time since 2016. After a six-year absence from the NCAA tournament, IU was selected as a No. 12 seed to play in the NCAA tournament First Four round in Dayton, Ohio. They knocked off No. 12 seed Wyoming to make it to the first round (Round of 64) where they lost to No. 5 seed St. Mary's.

The Hoosiers finished the 2022–23 regular season ranked No. 19 in the Associated Press poll. The team spent 16 weeks among the top-25 teams in the nation. The Hoosiers also captured a share of 2nd place in the Big Ten Conference with a 21–10 overall regular season record, 12–8 in Big Ten play, and the No. 3 seed in the Big Ten Conference tournament. IU advanced to the quarterfinals before losing a close game to Penn State. For the second year in a row, the team found themselves in the NCAA Tournament this time as a No. 4 seed, where they improved upon their performance last year by making it to the Round of 32 but falling to the No. 5 seed Miami (FL), 85–69. Woodson's third season didn't meet expectations as the 2023–24 Hoosiers finished 19–14 overall and 10–10 in the Big Ten. IU received the No. 6 seed in the Big Ten Conference tournament, where they beat Penn State for the first time that season, 61–59 with a last second tip-in by Anthony Leal. In the quarterfinals, IU lost to Nebraska for the third time that season, 93–66.

The 2024–25 season ended up being Mike Woodson's final year as the head coach. On February 7, 2025, IU Athletics issued a statement confirming that Woodson would retire at the end of the season. For the second year in a row IU missed out on the 2025 NCAA Tournament. Turning down other post-season tournament invites, the Hoosiers finished with an overall record of 19–13 and 10–10 in Big Ten Conference play, finishing the four-year Mike Woodson era.

=== Darian DeVries era (2025–present) ===
On March 18, 2025, West Virginia head coach Darian DeVries was hired as the 31st head coach of the IU program. Within weeks of the end of the 2024–25 season, all scholarship players with remaining eligibility entered the transfer portal, forcing DeVries to begin his first season with a completely new roster. The Hoosiers found themselves in a promising position to make the NCAA tournament for the first time since 2023 by starting 17–8; however, IU lost 5 of their last 6 regular season games. Finishing 10th in the conference, IU earned the No. 10 seed and faced off against No. 15 seed Northwestern, but fell 61–74. The Hoosiers' season concluded with an overall record of 18–14, and 9–11 in Big Ten play. IU missed the NCAA tournament for the third straight year, ending up in the First Four out. On March 15, 2026, IU announced that they would not participate in any postseason tournaments, bringing the first year under Devries to a close.

== Season-by-season records ==
Record table
Season	Coach	Overall	Conference	Standing	Postseason
Darian DeVries (Big Ten Conference) (2025–present)
2025–26	Darian DeVries	18–14	9–11	10th	
2026–27	Darian DeVries	6–0	0–0		
Darian DeVries:		24–14	9–11		
Total:		1,974–1,144			
National champion Postseason invitational champion Conference regular season champion Conference regular season and conference tournament champion Division regular season champion Division regular season and conference tournament champion Conference tournament champion

== Current roster ==
2025–26 Indiana Hoosiers men's basketball team
Players
Coaches

Pos.	#	Name	Height	Weight	Year	Previous school	Hometown
G	0	Jasai Miles	6 ft 6 in (1.98 m)	210 lb (95 kg)	Jr	Miami Country Day/North Florida	Miami, FL
F	1	Reed Bailey	6 ft 10 in (2.08 m)	230 lb (104 kg)	Sr	Brewster Academy/Davidson	Harvard, MA
G	2	Jason Drake	6 ft 1 in (1.85 m)	200 lb (91 kg)	Jr	Ferndale/Drexel	Oak Park, MI
F	3	Lamar Wilkerson	6 ft 6 in (1.98 m)	205 lb (93 kg)	Sr	Ashdown/Sam Houston	Ashdown, AR
F	4	Sam Alexis	6 ft 9 in (2.06 m)	240 lb (109 kg)	Sr	Apopka/Florida	Apopka, FL
G	5	Conor Enright	6 ft 1 in (1.85 m)	180 lb (82 kg)	RS Sr	Mundelein/DePaul	Mundelein, IL
G	6	Tayton Conerway	6 ft 3 in (1.91 m)	190 lb (86 kg)	RS Sr	Centennial/Troy	Burleson, TX
G	7	Nick Dorn	6 ft 7 in (2.01 m)	225 lb (102 kg)	Jr	Julius L. Chambers/Elon	Charlotte, NC
F	10	Josh Harris	6 ft 8 in (2.03 m)	225 lb (102 kg)	So	Pembroke Pines Charter/North Florida	Pembroke Pines, FL
F	11	Trent Sisley	6 ft 8 in (2.03 m)	225 lb (102 kg)	Fr	Montverde Academy	Santa Claus, IN
F	12	Tucker DeVries	6 ft 7 in (2.01 m)	225 lb (102 kg)	RS Sr	Waukee/West Virginia	Waukee, IA
G	13	Aleksa Ristic	6 ft 3 in (1.91 m)	200 lb (91 kg)	Fr	Solid Rock Academy	Kragujevac, Serbia
G	14	Jordan Rayford (W)	6 ft 5 in (1.96 m)	210 lb (95 kg)	RS Jr	Phillips Academy/Air Force	Washington, D.C.
C	15	Andrej Acimovic	6 ft 11 in (2.11 m)	240 lb (109 kg)	Fr	KK Igokea	Bijeljina, Bosnia
G	18	Tryce Grensing (W)	6 ft 0 in (1.83 m)	175 lb (79 kg)	Fr	Providence Christian Academy	Murfreesboro, TN
G	21	Drew Snively (W)	6 ft 5 in (1.96 m)	190 lb (86 kg)	Fr	Zionsville	Zionsville, IN
G	30	Ian Stephens (W)	6 ft 6 in (1.98 m)	178 lb (81 kg)	Jr	New Palestine	New Palestine, IN

Head coach

- Darian DeVries (Northern Iowa)

Assistant coach(es)

- Drew Adams (Iowa)
- Kenny Johnson (Maryland)
- Nick Norton (Drake)
- Rod Clark (Lindsey Wilson)

Legend

- (C) Team captain
- (S) Suspended
- (I) Ineligible
- (W) Walk-on
- Injured
- Current redshirt

Roster
Last update: October 18, 2025

== Facilities ==
=== Old Assembly Hall (1901–1917) ===
Indiana played at the Men's Gymnasium between 1901 and 1917. Before the 1938 demolition, it became the Assembly Hall.

=== Men's Gymnasium (1917–1928) ===
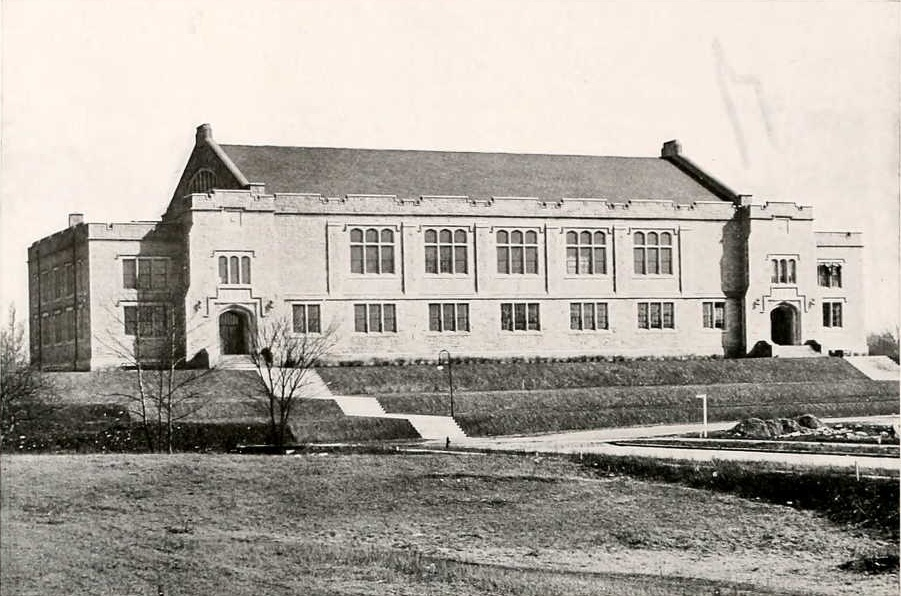
The Men's Gymnasium hosted Hoosier basketball from 1917 to 1928 and was the first in the nation to use glass backboards.

The Indiana Hoosiers began playing in the Men's Gymnasium in 1917. Due to complaints from spectators seated behind the backboards about poor visibility, the arena installed glass backboards, which may have been the first to be used in the United States. The basketball team's last season in the facility was in 1927–28, when the team won the conference championship. Because of the growing popularity of basketball at the school and the growing size of the student body, the team moved to a larger arena. It is now part of the School of Public Health-Bloomington.

=== IU Fieldhouse (1928–1960) ===
The Bill Garrett Fieldhouse or William Leon Garrett Fieldhouse (formerly known as simply the Fieldhouse) was named after Bill Garrett.

=== New IU Fieldhouse (1960–1971) ===
The New IU Fieldhouse (later named the Gladstein Fieldhouse) was originally intended as an interim home for the men's basketball team. However, NCAA sanctions on the football program hobbled the school's finances, and the "New" Fieldhouse ended up hosting the team for 11 years from 1960 to 1971. It now serves as a state-of-the-art track and field facility.

=== Simon Skjodt Assembly Hall (1971–present) ===
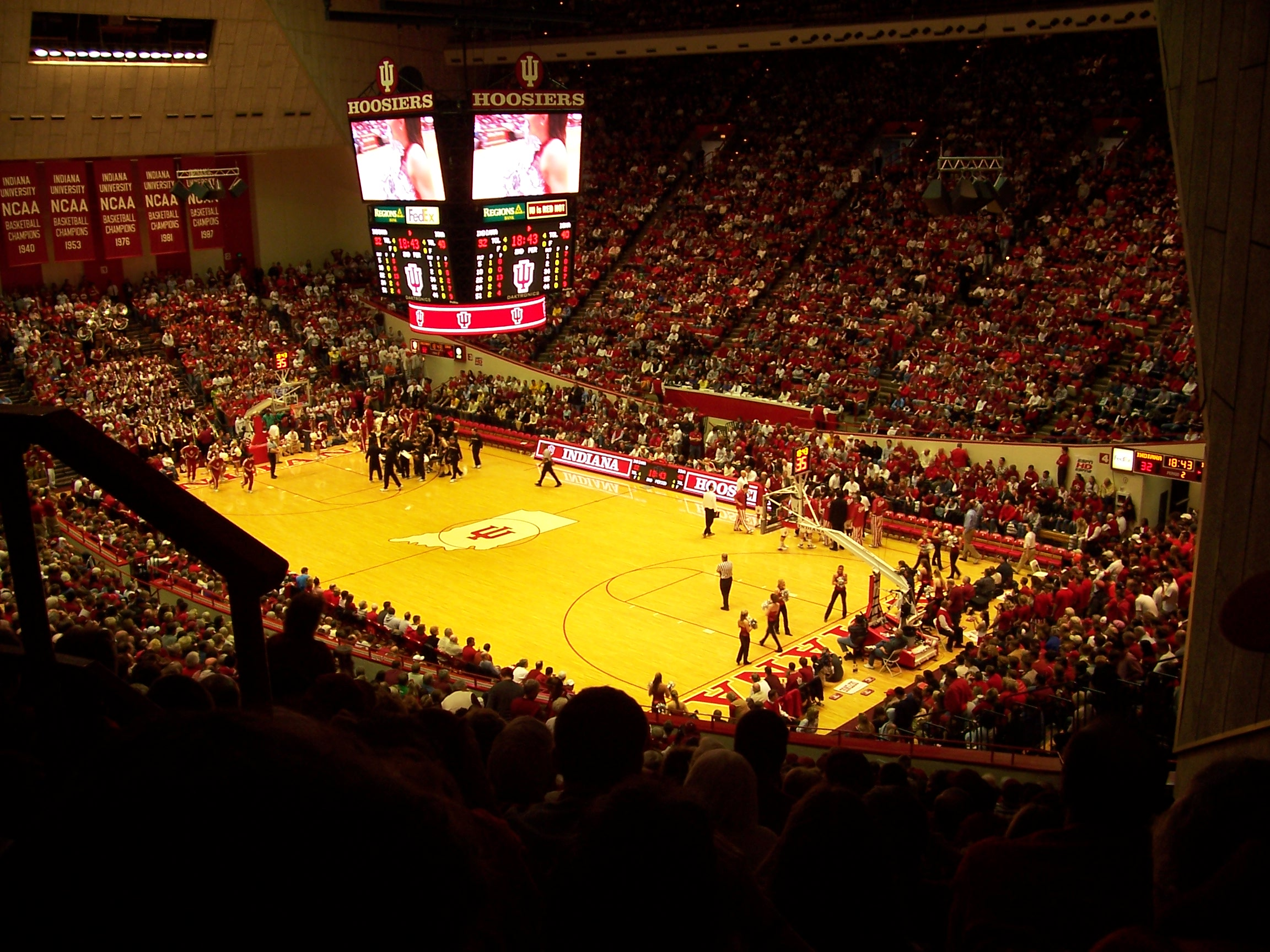
An interior view of Assembly Hall's Branch McCracken Court

The Hoosiers currently play at Simon Skjodt Assembly Hall (pronounced like Scott). The 17,222-seat arena has been the home of the men's basketball team since 1972. The basketball floor is named Branch McCracken Court after the legendary Hoosier coach. The north end of the arena prominently displays the program's five national championship banners. Former head coach Bob Knight called the facility a "sacred place" for student fans and athletes. Basketball sportscaster Gus Johnson called Assembly Hall "the Carnegie Hall of basketball."

=== Cook Hall (2010–present) ===
Cook Hall is a basketball practice facility that was completed in 2010 and is located next to Simon Skjodt Assembly Hall, connected by a tunnel. Bill and Gayle Cook donated $15 million to the "For the Glory of Old IU" campaign, out of which came Cook Hall where the IU basketball team is able to engage in day-to-day operations. It contains the Pfau Shine Legacy Court, a museum space that chronicles the history of Indiana basketball with photographs, artifacts, trophies and interactive touch-screen kiosks. The 67,000-square-foot, three story facility features two practice courts, two locker rooms, two player lounges, a strength and conditioning area, coaches' offices, and meeting rooms.

== Coaching history ==
Years	Duration of head coaching career at Indiana
Win–loss	Number of career games won-loss at Indiana
Win %	Percentage of games won at Indiana
B1G Tourn win-loss	Number of career games won-loss at Indiana in Big Ten men's basketball tournament
B1G Tourn win %	Percentage of games won at Indiana in Big Ten men's basketball tournament
*	Elected to the Naismith Memorial Basketball Hall of Fame as a coach

Coach	Years	Win–loss	Win %	Conference titles	B1G Tourn win-loss	B1G Tourn win %	NCAA Tourn. appearances	NCAA titles
James H. Horne	1901	1–4	.200	0	–	–	–	–
Phelps Darby	1902	4–4	.500	0	–	–	–	–
Willis Coval	1903–1904	13–8	.619	0	–	–	–	–
Zora Clevenger	1905–1906	12–21	.364	0	–	–	–	–
James M. Sheldon	1907	9–5	.643	0	–	–	–	–
Ed Cook	1908	9–6	.600	0	–	–	–	–
Robert Harris	1909	5–9	.357	0	–	–	–	–
John Georgen	1910	5–8	.385	0	–	–	–	–
Oscar Rackle	1911	11–5	.688	0	–	–	–	–
James Kase	1912	6–11	.353	0	–	–	–	–
Arthur Powell	1913	5–11	.312	0	–	–	–	–
Arthur Berndt	1914–1915	6–21	.222	0	–	–	–	–
Allan Williford	1916	6–7	.462	0	–	–	–	–
Guy Lowman	1917	13–6	.684	0	–	–	–	–
Dana Evans	1918–1919	20–11	.645	0	–	–	–	–
Ewald O. Stiehm	1920	13–8	.619	0	–	–	–	–
George Levis	1921–1922	25–16	.610	0	–	–	–	–
Leslie Mann	1922–1924	19–13	.594	0	–	–	–	–
Everett Dean*	1924–1938	162–93	.635	3	–	–	–	–
Branch McCracken*	1938–1943, 1946–1965	364–174	.677	4	–	–	4	2
Harry C. Good	1943–1946	35–29	.547	0	–	–	0	0
Lou Watson	1965–1971	65–60	.520	1	–	–	1	0
Jerry Oliver	1969–1970, 1971	4–17	.190	0	–	–	0	0
Bob Knight*	1971–2000	662–239	.735	11	1–3	.250	24	3
Mike Davis	2000–2006	115–79	.592	1	7–6	.538	4	0
Kelvin Sampson	2006–2008	43–15	.741	0	0–1	.000	1	0
Dan Dakich	2008	3–4	.429	0	0–1	.000	1	0
Tom Crean	2008–2017	166–135	.552	2	4–9	.308	4	0
Archie Miller	2017–2021	67–58	.536	0	1–3	.250	0	0
Mike Woodson	2021–2025	82–53	.607	0	4–4	.500	2	0
Darian DeVries	2025–present	24–14	0.632	0	0–1	.000	0	0

== Notable players and coaches ==
Indiana does not retire numbers of former players, unlike many other college basketball programs.

=== 1,000-point scorers ===
The Hoosiers currently have 56 players in their 1,000-point club.

Calbert Cheaney is the all-time leading scorer at Indiana University with 2,613 points. Cheaney was able to reach the 1,000-point milestone in just 53 games, the 4th quickest Hoosier to do so. Others of honorable mention include Don Schlundt (43 games), Archie Dees (47 games), Walt Bellamy (50 games), Mike Woodson and Jimmy Rayl (54 games), Joe Cooke and Jay Edwards (55 games), Bracey Wright (59 games), and rounding out the top 10 is Tom Bolyard (60 games).

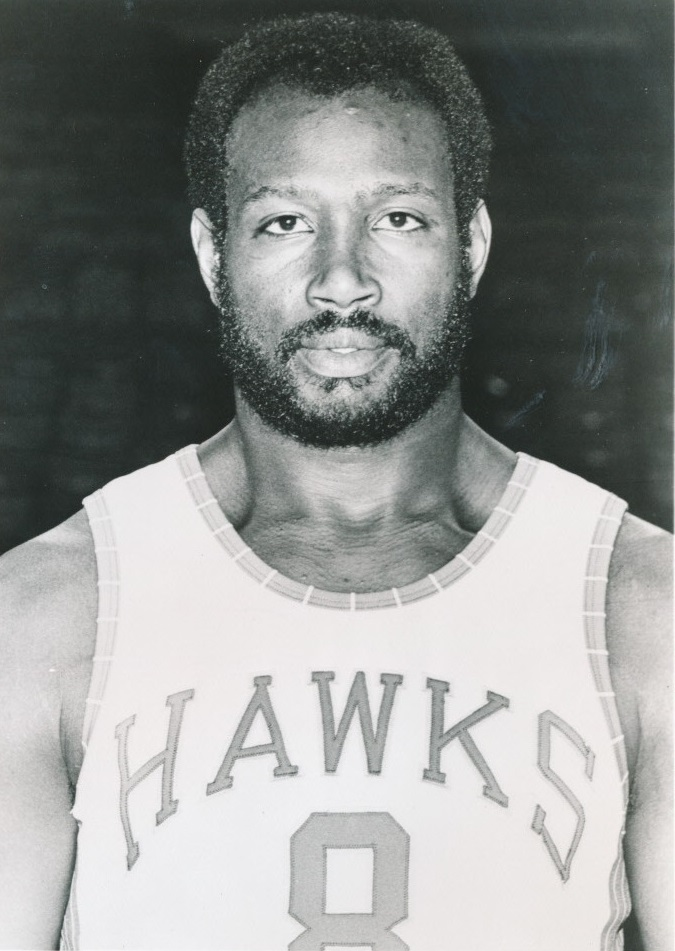
Walt Bellamy scored 1,441 points.

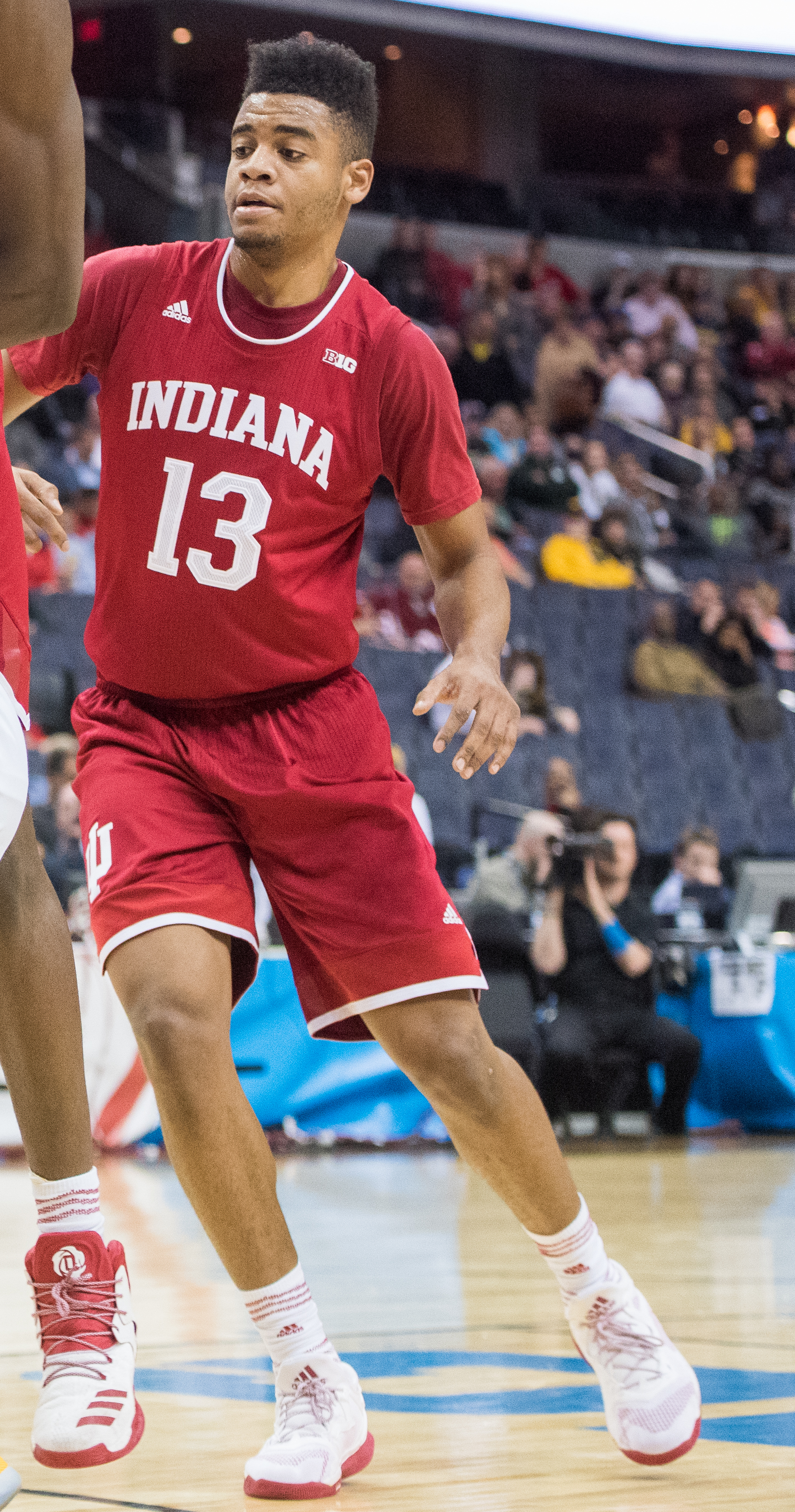
Juwan Morgan scored 1,374 points.

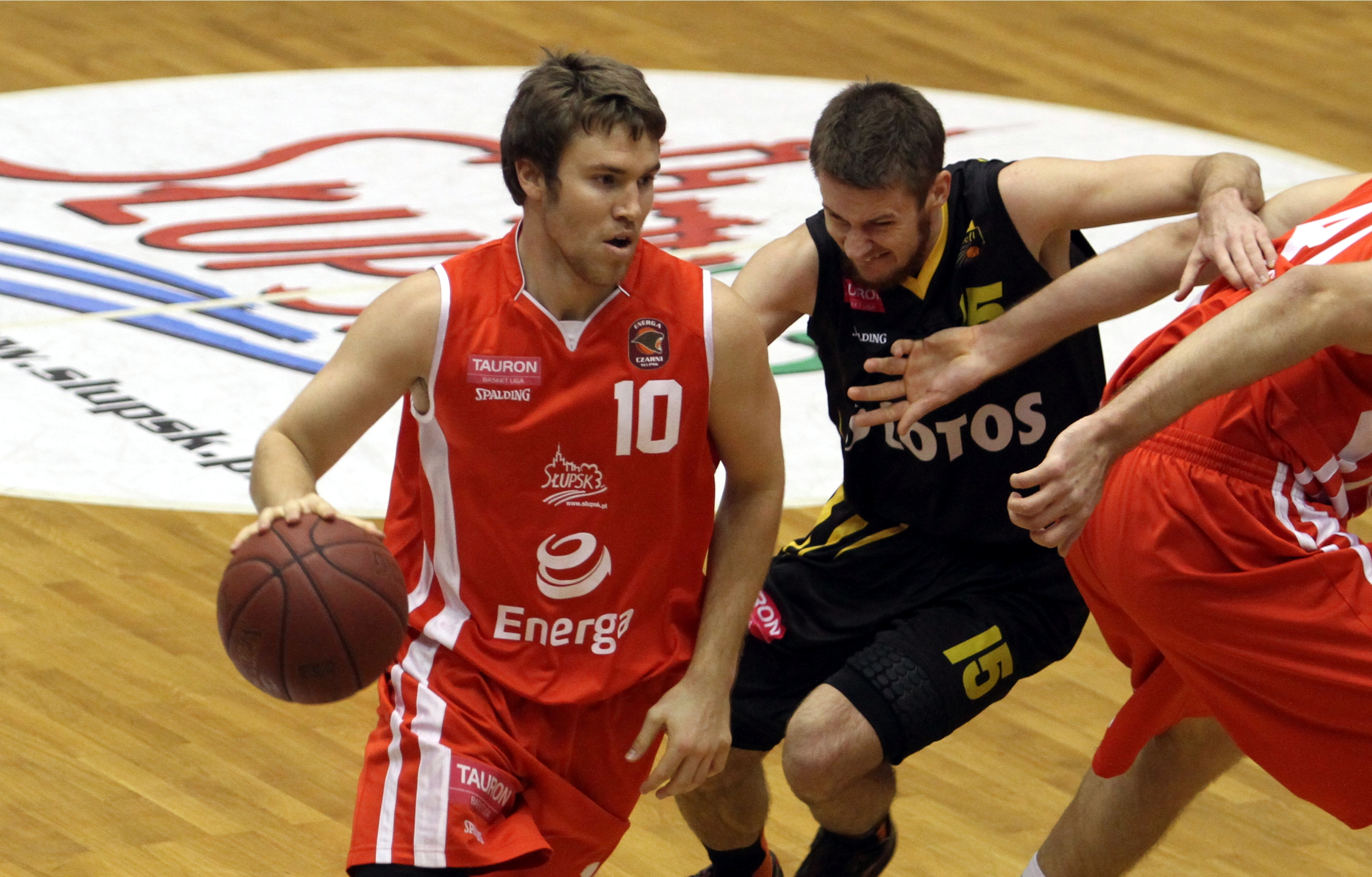
Jordan Hulls scored 1,318 points.

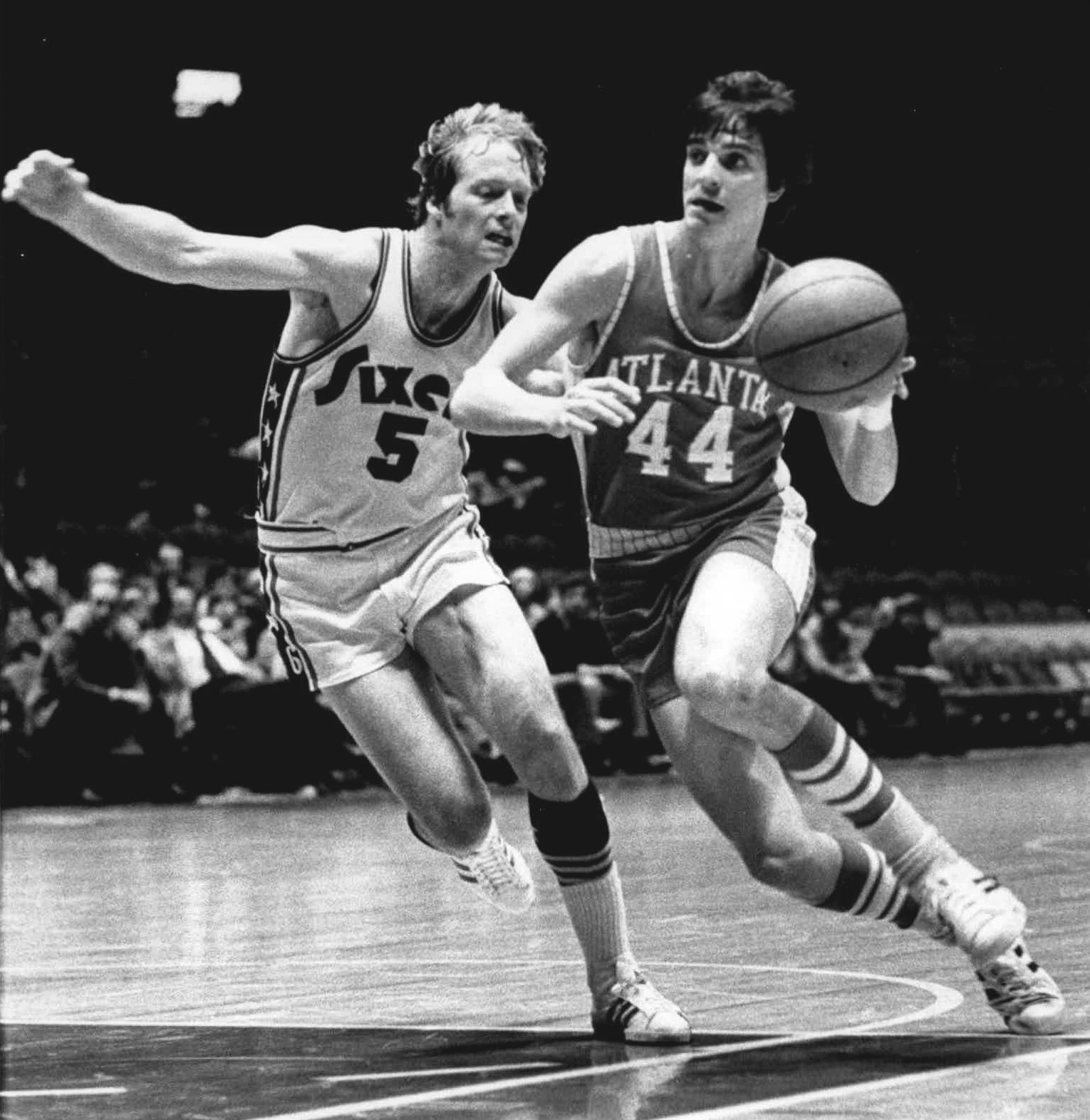
Tom Van Arsdale (left) scored 1,252 points.

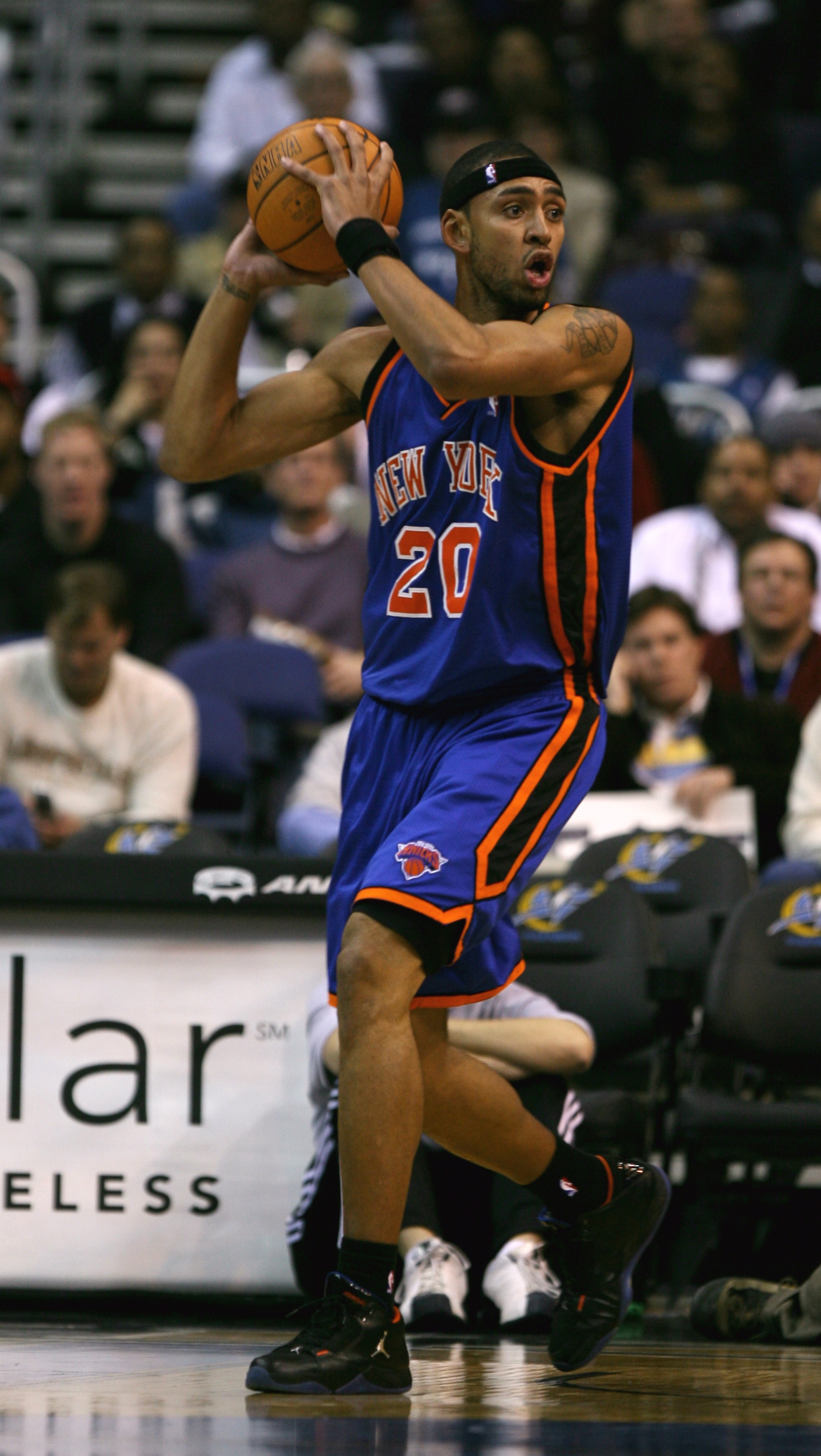
Jared Jeffries scored 1,008 points.

Rank	Player name	Points	Seasons played
1	Calbert Cheaney	2,613	1989–93
2	Steve Alford	2,438	1983–87
3	Trayce Jackson-Davis	2,258	2019–23
4	Don Schlundt	2,192	1951–55
5	A. J. Guyton	2,100	1996–00
6	Mike Woodson	2,061	1976–80
7	Yogi Ferrell	1,986	2012–16
8	Alan Henderson	1,979	1991–95
9	Damon Bailey	1,741	1990–94
10	Kent Benson	1,740	1973–77
11	Christian Watford	1,730	2009–13
12	Eric Anderson	1,715	1988–92
13	Brian Evans	1,701	1992–96
14	Scott May	1,593	1972–76
15	Greg Graham	1,590	1989–93
16	Randy Wittman	1,549	1978–83
17	Archie Dees	1,546	1955–58
18	Bracey Wright	1,498	2002–05
19	D. J. White	1,447	2004–08
20	Walt Bellamy	1,441	1958–61
21	Ray Tolbert	1,427	1977–81
22	Robert Johnson	1,413	2014–18
23	Kirk Haston	1,406	1998–01
24	Jimmy Rayl	1,401	1960–63
25	Juwan Morgan	1,374	2015–19
26	Andrae Patterson	1,365	1994–98
27	Uwe Blab	1,357	1981–85
28	Verdell Jones III	1,347	2009–12
29	Ted Kitchel	1,336	1978–83
30	Jordan Hulls	1,318	2009–13
31	Tom Bolyard	1,299	1960–63
32	Joby Wright	1,272	1969–72
33	Steve Green	1,265	1972–75
34	Tom Van Arsdale	1,252	1962–65
35	Dick Van Arsdale	1,240	1962–65
36	James Blackmon Jr.	1,221	2014–17
37	Steve Downing	1,220	1970–73
38	Tom Coverdale	1,217	1999–03
39	Jeff Newton	1,203	1999–03
40	Quinn Buckner	1,195	1972–76
41	Cody Zeller	1,157	2011–13
42	Will Sheehey	1,120	2010–14
43	Victor Oladipo	1,117	2010–13
44	Troy Williams	1,115	2013–16
45	Marshall Strickland	1,106	2002–06
46	Vernon Payne	1,101	1965–68
47	Joe Cooke	1,099	1967–70
48	Bobby Leonard	1,098	1951–54
49	Daryl Thomas	1,095	1983–87
50	Rick Calloway	1,073	1985–88
51	Malik Reneau	1,070	2022–25
52	Jay Edwards	1,038	1987–89
53	Al Durham	1,035	2017–21
54	Butch Joyner	1,030	1965–68
55	Trey Galloway	1,020	2020–25
56	Jared Jeffries	1,008	2000–02

=== National Players of the Year ===
- Kent Benson – 1976 (Helms Foundation)
- Scott May – 1976 (Naismith, Helms Foundation, Sporting News, NABC, Associated Press, UPI)
- Calbert Cheaney – 1993 (Wooden, Naismith, Sporting News, Oscar Robertson, NABC, Associated Press, UPI)
- Victor Oladipo – 2013 (Sporting News)

=== All-Americans ===
Indiana has a total of 46 players who have claimed All-American status, with 14 of them earning First-Team All-American.

- Everett Dean – 1921♦
- Jim Strickland – 1929
- Branch McCracken – 1930♦
- Vern Huffman – 1936♦
- Ken Gunning – 1937
- Ernie Andres – 1938, 1939♦
- Marv Huffman – 1940
- Bill Menke – 1940
- Andy Zimmer – 1942
- John Wallace – 1946
- Ralph Hamilton – 1947♦
- Lou Watson – 1950
- Bill Garrett – 1951
- Don Schlundt – 1953, 1954♦, 1955
- Bobby Leonard – 1954
- Archie Dees – 1957, 1958
- Walt Bellamy – 1960, 1961
- Jimmy Rayl – 1962, 1963
- Dick Van Arsdale – 1965
- Tom Van Arsdale – 1965
- George McGinnis – 1971
- Steve Downing – 1973
- Steve Green – 1974, 1975
- Quinn Buckner – 1975, 1976
- Scott May – 1975♦, 1976♦
- Kent Benson – 1975, 1976♦, 1977♦
- Mike Woodson – 1979, 1980
- Isiah Thomas – 1981♦
- Ted Kitchel – 1982, 1983
- Landon Turner – 1982
- Randy Wittman – 1983
- Steve Alford – 1986♦, 1987♦
- Jay Edwards – 1989
- Calbert Cheaney – 1991, 1992, 1993♦
- Damon Bailey – 1994
- Alan Henderson – 1995
- Brian Evans – 1996
- A. J. Guyton – 2000♦
- Kirk Haston – 2001
- Jared Jeffries – 2002
- Eric Gordon – 2008
- D. J. White – 2008
- Cody Zeller – 2013
- Victor Oladipo – 2013♦
- Yogi Ferrell – 2016
- Trayce Jackson-Davis – 2021, 2023♦

♦ Denotes Consensus First-Team All-American

=== Academic All-Americans ===
A total of 11 Hoosiers have been deemed Academic All-Americans.

- Dick Van Arsdale – 1964, 1965
- Tom Van Arsdale – 1965
- John Ritter – 1973
- Steve Green – 1974, 1975
- Kent Benson – 1976, 1977
- Wayne Radford – 1978
- Randy Wittman – 1982, 1983
- Uwe Blab – 1985
- Luke Recker – 1999
- Jordan Hulls – 2013
- Cody Zeller – 2013

=== McDonald's All-Americans ===
Indiana has recruited a total of 34 McDonald's All-Americans; the first in 1977 and the latest in 2024.

- Tom Baker – 1977
- Ray Tolbert – 1977
- Landon Turner – 1978
- Isiah Thomas – 1979
- John Flowers – 1981
- Daryl Thomas – 1983
- Delray Brooks – 1984
- Ricky Calloway – 1985
- Jay Edwards – 1987
- Eric Anderson – 1988
- Greg Graham – 1989
- Pat Graham – 1989
- Damon Bailey – 1990
- Alan Henderson – 1991
- Sherron Wilkerson – 1993
- Andrae Patterson – 1994
- Neil Reed – 1994
- Jason Collier – 1996
- Luke Recker – 1997
- Dane Fife – 1998
- Jared Jeffries – 2000
- Bracey Wright – 2002
- D. J. White – 2004
- Eric Gordon – 2007
- Cody Zeller – 2011
- Yogi Ferrell – 2012
- Noah Vonleh – 2013
- James Blackmon Jr. – 2014
- Thomas Bryant – 2015
- Romeo Langford – 2018
- Trayce Jackson-Davis – 2019
- Kel'el Ware – 2022
- Mackenzie Mgbako – 2023
- Bryson Tucker – 2024

=== Indiana Mr. Basketball ===
29 Indiana Mr. Basketball honorees have played for Indiana.

- Ed Schienbein – 1940
- Tom Schwartz – 1945
- Bill Garrett – 1947
- Bob Masters – 1948
- Hallie Bryant – 1953
- Jimmy Rayl – 1959
- Tom Van Arsdale – 1961
- Dick Van Arsdale – 1961
- George McGinnis – 1969
- Dave Shepherd - 1970
- Kent Benson – 1973
- Ray Tolbert – 1977
- Steve Bouchie – 1979
- Steve Alford – 1983
- Delray Brooks – 1984
- Jay Edwards – 1987
- Lyndon Jones – 1987
- Pat Graham – 1989
- Damon Bailey – 1990
- Luke Recker – 1997
- Tom Coverdale – 1998
- Jared Jeffries – 2000
- A.J. Ratfliff – 2004
- Eric Gordon – 2007
- Jordan Hulls – 2009
- Cody Zeller – 2011
- Romeo Langford – 2018
- Trayce Jackson-Davis – 2019
- Anthony Leal – 2020

=== Coaching honors ===
National Coach of the Year

- Branch McCracken – 1940, 1953
- Bob Knight – 1975, 1989 (Henry Iba Award, UPI)
- Bob Knight – 1975, 1976, 1989 (Associated Press)
- Bob Knight – 1987 (Naismith College Coach of the Year)
- Tom Crean – 2012 (ESPN.com)

Big Ten Coach of the Year

- Bob Knight – 1975, 1976, 1980, 1981, 1989
- Tom Crean – 2016

=== Big Ten Conference honors ===
Big Ten Player of the Year

- Don Schlundt – 1953
- Archie Dees – 1957, 1958
- Steve Downing – 1973
- Scott May – 1975, 1976
- Kent Benson – 1977
- Mike Woodson – 1980
- Ray Tolbert – 1981
- Randy Wittman – 1983
- Steve Alford – 1986, 1987
- Calbert Cheaney – 1993
- Brian Evans – 1996
- A. J. Guyton – 2000
- Kirk Haston – 2001
- Jared Jeffries – 2002
- D. J. White – 2008

Big Ten Freshman of the Year

- Dean Garrett – 1987
- Jay Edwards – 1988
- Eric Anderson – 1989
- Damon Bailey – 1991
- A. J. Guyton – 1997
- Jared Jeffries – 2001
- D. J. White – 2005
- Eric Gordon – 2008
- Cody Zeller – 2012
- Noah Vonleh – 2014
- Jalen Hood-Schifino – 2023
- Mackenzie Mgbako – 2024

=== Naismith Memorial Basketball Hall of Famers ===
- Branch McCracken, inducted in 1960 as a player
- Everett Dean, inducted in 1966 as a coach
- Bob Knight, inducted in 1991 as a coach
- Walt Bellamy, inducted in 1993 as a player
- Isiah Thomas, inducted in 2000 as a player
- Bobby "Slick" Leonard, inducted in 2014 as a coach
- George McGinnis, inducted in 2017 as a player

=== National Collegiate Basketball Hall of Famers ===
- Everett Dean, inducted in 2006 as a coach
- Branch McCracken, inducted in 2006 as a player
- Bob Knight, inducted in 2006 as a coach
- Isiah Thomas, inducted in 2006 as a player
- Walt Bellamy, inducted in 2006 as a player
- Quinn Buckner, inducted in 2015 as a player
- Scott May, inducted in 2017 as a player
- Calbert Cheaney, inducted in 2019 as a player
- 1975-76 Indiana Hoosiers men's basketball team, inducted in 2020 as a team

=== Current NBA players ===
- Eric Gordon (Memphis Grizzlies)
- Thomas Bryant (Cleveland Cavaliers)
- O.G. Anunoby (New York Knicks)
- Trayce Jackson-Davis (Toronto Raptors)
- Kel'el Ware (Milwaukee Bucks)

=== Olympians ===
Year	City	Olympian	Medal
1960	Rome	Walt Bellamy	Gold medal
1976	Montreal	Quinn Buckner	Gold medal
1976	Montreal	Scott May	Gold medal
1984	Los Angeles	Bobby Knight	Gold medal
1984	Los Angeles	Steve Alford	Gold medal

== School records ==
=== Conferences ===
Years	Conferences	Win–loss	Pct.
1899–1917	Big Nine	105–126	.455
1918–1945	Big Ten	343–184	.651
1946–1950	Big Nine	69–36	.657
1951–present	Big Ten	1,460–795	.648

=== Record vs. Big Ten opponents ===
Opponent	Wins	Losses	Pct.	Streak
Illinois	96	94	.505	Illinois 3
Iowa	106	83	.561	Iowa 2
Maryland	15	10	.600	Indiana 1
Michigan	110	67	.622	Michigan 2
Michigan State	74	60	.552	Michigan State 2
Minnesota	110	70	.611	Indiana 1
Nebraska	19	12	.613	Nebraska 5
Northwestern	119	60	.665	Northwestern 7
Ohio State	114	88	.564	Ohio State 1
Oregon	4	2	.667	Indiana 1
Penn State	46	17	.730	Indiana 4
Purdue	94	129	.422	Purdue 1
Rutgers	10	9	.526	Indiana 2
UCLA	7	7	.500	Indiana 1
USC	3	3	.500	USC 1
Washington	5	1	.833	Indiana 5
Wisconsin	100	81	.553	Indiana 1

Updated March 11, 2026

=== Team season records ===
Record	Total	Year
Field goals made	1,148	1974–1975
Field goals %	53.7	1985–1986
Free throws made	760	2002–2003
Free throw %	76.8	1964–1965
3-pt. field goals made	345	2015–2016
3-pt. field goal %	50.8	1986–1987
Rebounds	1,433	1974–1975
Assists	655	1975–1976
Blocked shots	192	2001–2002

=== Individual career ===
Record	Player	Total	Years	Ref
Most Points	Calbert Cheaney	2,613	1989–1993	
Highest Scoring Average	George McGinnis	29.9	1970–1971	
Most Rebounds	Trayce Jackson-Davis	1,143	2019–2023	
Most Assists	Yogi Ferrell	633	2012–2016	
Most Steals	Dane Fife	180	1998–2002	
Most Blocks	Trayce Jackson-Davis	270	2019–2023	

=== Career leaders ===
Updated through 2025–26 season

Points
Player	Years	Points
Calbert Cheaney	1989–1993	2,613
Steve Alford	1983–1987	2,438
Trayce Jackson-Davis	2019–2023	2,258
Don Schlundt	1951–1955	2,192
A.J. Guyton	1996–2000	2,100
Mike Woodson	1976–1980	2,061
Yogi Ferrell	2012–2016	1,986
Alan Henderson	1991–1995	1,979
Damon Bailey	1990–1994	1,741
Kent Benson	1973–1977	1,740

Rebounds
Player	Years	Rebounds
Trayce Jackson-Davis	2019–2023	1,143
Alan Henderson	1991–1995	1,091
Walt Bellamy	1958–1961	1,087
Kent Benson	1973–1977	1,031
Archie Dees	1955–1958	914
Steve Downing	1970–1973	889
Ray Tolbert	1977–1981	874
Don Schlundt	1951–1955	860
Eric Anderson	1988–1992	825
Christian Watford	2009–2013	776

Assists
Player	Years	Assists
Yogi Ferrell	2012–2016	633
Michael Lewis	1996–2000	545
Quinn Buckner	1972–1976	542
Tom Coverdale	1999–2003	500
Jamal Meeks	1988–1992	474
Damon Bailey	1990–1994	474
Trey Galloway	2020–2025	433
Randy Wittman	1978–1983	432
A.J. Guyton	1996–2000	403
Stew Robinson	1982–1986	391

Steals
Player	Years	Steals
Dane Fife	1998–2002	180
Steve Alford	1983–1987	178
Victor Oladipo	2010–2013	161
Greg Graham	1989–1993	151
Alan Henderson	1991–1995	148
Mike Woodson	1976–1980	142
Tom Coverdale	1999–2003	137
Isiah Thomas	1979–1981	136
Chris Reynolds	1989–1993	135
Damon Bailey	1990–1994	132

Blocks
Player	Years	Blocks
Trayce Jackson-Davis	2019–2023	270
Jeff Newton	1999–2003	227
Alan Henderson	1991–1995	213
D.J. White	2004–2008	198
Uwe Blab	1981–1985	196
George Leach	2000–2004	194
Dean Garrett	1986–1988	192
Ray Tolbert	1977–1981	155
Juwan Morgan	2015–2019	138
Eric Anderson	1988–1992	136

== Postseason appearances ==
Indiana has won five NCAA Championships in men's basketball (1940, 1953, 1976, 1981, 1987) — the first two under coach Branch McCracken and the latter three under Bob Knight — and 22 Big Ten Conference championships. The Hoosiers' five NCAA Championships are tied with Duke (5) for the fourth-most in history, trailing only UCLA (11), Kentucky (8), North Carolina and UConn (6). Their eight trips to the Final Four ranks eighth (tied) on the all-time list. The Hoosiers have made 41 appearances in the NCAA Division I men's basketball tournament (sixth-most in NCAA history). In those 41 appearances, Indiana has posted a 68–36 record (.654). Its 68 victories are the seventh-most in NCAA history. The Hoosiers also won post-season tournaments in 1974, the Collegiate Commissioners Association Tournament, and in 1979, the National Invitation Tournament. As of 2023, the 1976 Hoosiers remain the last NCAA men's basketball team to go undefeated in both regular season and postseason play.

=== NCAA tournament ===
Championship results

National Championships
Indiana; University; NCAA; Basketball; Champions; 1940	Indiana; University; NCAA; Basketball; Champions; 1953	Indiana; University; NCAA; Basketball; Champions; 1976	Indiana; University; NCAA; Basketball; Champions; 1981	Indiana; University; NCAA; Basketball; Champions; 1987

1940 NCAA Tournament results
Round	Opponent	Score
Regional semifinals	Springfield	48–24
Regional finals	Duquesne	39–30
National finals	Kansas	60–42

1953 NCAA Tournament results
Round	Opponent	Score
Regional semifinals	DePaul	82–80
Regional finals	Notre Dame	79–66
National semifinals	LSU	80–67
National finals	Kansas	69–68

1976 NCAA Tournament results
Round	Opponent	Score
Round #2	St. John's	90–70
Regional semifinals	Alabama	74–69
Regional finals	Marquette	65–56
National semifinals	UCLA	65–51
National finals	Michigan	86–68

1981 NCAA Tournament results
Round	Opponent	Score
Round #2	# 6 Maryland	99–64
Regional semifinals	#7 UAB	87–72
Regional finals	#9 St. Joseph's	78–46
National semifinals	#1 LSU	95–84
National finals	#2 North Carolina	63–50

1987 NCAA Tournament results
Round	Opponent	Score
Round #1	#16 Fairfield	92–58
Round #2	#8 Auburn	107–90
Regional semifinals	#5 Duke	88–82
Regional finals	#10 LSU	77–76
National semifinals	#1 UNLV	97–93
National finals	#2 Syracuse	74–73

NCAA Men's MOP Award

- 1940 – Marvin Huffman
- 1976 – Kent Benson
- 1981 – Isiah Thomas
- 1987 – Keith Smart

=== NCAA tournament seeding history ===
The NCAA began seeding the tournament with the 1979 edition.

Years →	'80	'81	'82	'83	'84	'86	'87	'88	'89	'90	'91	'92	'93	'94	'95	'96	'97	'98	'99
Seeds →	2	3	5	2	5	3	1	4	2	8	2	2	1	5	9	6	8	7	6

Years →	'00	'01	'02	'03	'06	'07	'08	'12	'13	'15	'16	'22	'23
Seeds →	6	4	5	7	6	7	8	4	1	10	5	12	4

=== Complete NCAA tournament results ===
The Hoosiers have appeared in the NCAA tournament 41 times. Their combined record is 68–36.

Year	Seed	Round	Opponent	Results
1940		Elite Eight; Final Four; National Championship Game	Springfield; Duquesne; Kansas	W 48–24; W 39–30; W 60–42
1953		Sweet Sixteen; Elite Eight; Final Four; National Championship Game	DePaul; Notre Dame; LSU; Kansas	W 82–80; W 79–66; W 80–67; W 69–68
1954		Sweet Sixteen; Regional 3rd-place game	Notre Dame; LSU	L 64–65; W 73–62
1958		Sweet Sixteen; Regional 3rd-place game	Notre Dame; Miami (OH)	L 87–94; W 98–91
1967		Sweet Sixteen; Regional 3rd-place game	Virginia Tech; Tennessee	L 70–79; W 51–44
1973		Sweet Sixteen; Elite Eight; Final Four; National 3rd-place game	Marquette; Kentucky; UCLA; Providence	W 75–69; W 72–65; L 59–70; W 97–79
1975		First Round; Sweet Sixteen; Elite Eight	UTEP; Oregon State; Kentucky	W 78–53; W 81–71; L 90–92
1976		First Round; Sweet Sixteen; Elite Eight; Final Four; National Championship Game	St. John's; Alabama; Marquette; UCLA; Michigan	W 90–70; W 74–69; W 65–56; W 65–51; W 86–68
1978		First Round; Sweet Sixteen	Furman; Villanova	W 63–62; L 60–61
1980	#2	Second Round; Sweet Sixteen	#7 Virginia Tech #6 Purdue	W 68–59; L 69–76
1981	#3	Second Round; Sweet Sixteen; Elite Eight; Final Four; National Championship Game	#6 Maryland #7 UAB #9 Saint Joseph's #1 LSU #2 North Carolina	W 99–64; W 87–72; W 78–46; W 67–49; W 63–50
1982	#5	First Round; Second Round	#12 Robert Morris #4 UAB	W 94–62; L 70–80
1983	#2	Second Round; Sweet Sixteen	#7 Oklahoma #3 Kentucky	W 63–49; L 59–64
1984	#4	Second Round; Sweet Sixteen; Elite Eight	#12 Richmond #1 North Carolina #7 Virginia	W 75–67; W 72–68; L 48–50
1986	#3	First Round	#14 Cleveland State	L 79–83
1987	#1	First Round; Second Round; Sweet Sixteen; Elite Eight; Final Four; National Championship Game	#16 Fairfield #8 Auburn #5 Duke #10 LSU #1 UNLV #2 Syracuse	W 92–58; W 107–90; W 88–82; W 77–76; W 97–93; W 74–73
1988	#4	First Round	#13 Richmond	L 69–72
1989	#2	First Round; Second Round; Sweet Sixteen	#15 George Mason #7 UTEP #3 Seton Hall	W 99–85; W 92–69; L 65–78
1990	#8	First Round	#9 California	L 63–65
1991	#2	First Round; Second Round; Sweet Sixteen	#15 Coastal Carolina #7 Florida State #3 Kansas	W 79–69; W 82–60; L 65–83
1992	#2	First Round; Second Round; Sweet Sixteen; Elite Eight; Final Four	#15 Eastern Illinois #7 LSU #3 Florida State #1 UCLA #1 Duke	W 94–55; W 89–79; W 85–74; W 106–79; L 78–81
1993	#1	First Round; Second Round; Sweet Sixteen; Elite Eight	#16 Wright State #9 Xavier #4 Louisville #2 Kansas	W 97–54; W 73–70; W 82–69; L 77–83
1994	#5	First Round; Second Round; Sweet Sixteen	#12 Ohio #4 Temple #9 Boston College	W 84–72; W 67–58; L 68–77
1995	#9	First Round	#8 Missouri	L 60–65
1996	#6	First Round	#11 Boston College	L 51–64
1997	#8	First Round	#9 Colorado	L 62–80
1998	#7	First Round; Second Round	#10 Oklahoma #2 Connecticut	W 94–87 ^{OT} L 68–78
1999	#6	First Round; Second Round	#11 George Washington #3 St. John's	W 108–88; L 61–86
2000	#6	First Round	#11 Pepperdine	L 57–77
2001	#4	First Round	#13 Kent State	L 73–77
2002	#5	First Round; Second Round; Sweet Sixteen; Elite Eight; Final Four; National Championship Game	#12 Utah #13 UNC Wilmington #1 Duke #10 Kent State #2 Oklahoma #1 Maryland	W 75–56; W 76–67; W 74–73; W 81–69; W 73–64; L 52–64
2003	#7	First Round; Second Round	#10 Alabama #2 Pittsburgh	W 67–62; L 52–74
2006	#6	First Round; Second Round	#11 San Diego State #3 Gonzaga	W 87–83; L 80–90
2007	#7	First Round; Second Round	#10 Gonzaga #2 UCLA	W 70–57; L 49–54
2008	#8	First Round	#9 Arkansas	L 72–86
2012	#4	First Round; Second Round; Sweet Sixteen	#13 New Mexico State #12 VCU #1 Kentucky	W 79–66; W 63–61; L 90–102
2013	#1	First Round; Second Round; Sweet Sixteen	#16 James Madison #9 Temple #4 Syracuse	W 83–62; W 58–52; L 50–61
2015	#10	First Round	#7 Wichita State	L 76–81
2016	#5	First Round; Second Round; Sweet Sixteen	#12 Chattanooga #4 Kentucky #1 North Carolina	W 99–74; W 73–67; L 86–101
2022	#12	First Four; First Round	#12 Wyoming #5 Saint Mary's	W 66–58; L 53–82
2023	#4	First Round; Second Round	#13 Kent State #5 Miami (FL)	W 71–60; L 69–85

=== NIT results ===
The Hoosiers have appeared in the National Invitation Tournament (NIT) six times. Their combined record is 10–5. They were NIT champions in 1979.

Year	Round	Opponent	Result
1972	First round	Princeton	L 60–68
1979	First round Second Round; Semifinals; Final	Texas Tech; Alcorn State; Ohio State; Purdue	W 78–59; W 72–68; W 64–55; W 53–52
1985	First round Second Round; Quarterfinals; Semifinals; Final	Butler; Richmond; Marquette; Tennessee; UCLA	W 79–57; W 75–53; W 94–82; W 74–67; L 62–65
2005	First round	Vanderbilt	L 60–67
2017	First round	Georgia Tech	L 63–75
2019	First round Second Round; Quarterfinals	Saint Francis (PA); Arkansas; Wichita State	W 89–72; W 63–60; L 63–73

=== CCAT results ===
The Hoosiers appeared in one of the only two ever Collegiate Commissioners Association tournaments. Their record is 3–0, and they were champions in 1974.

Year	Round	Opponent	Result
1974	Quarterfinals; Semifinals; Final	Tennessee; Toledo; USC	W 73–71; W 73–72; W 83–76

=== Big Ten regular season championships ===
Indiana has won 22 Big Ten regular-season championships, the second-most in Big Ten history.

Season	Coach	Overall record	Big Ten record
1925–26	Everett Dean	12–5	8–4
1927–28	Everett Dean	15–2	10–2
1935–36	Everett Dean	18–2	11–1
1952–53	Branch McCracken	23–3	17–1
1953–54	Branch McCracken	20–4	12–2
1956–57	Branch McCracken	14–8	10–4
1957–58	Branch McCracken	13–11	10–4
1966–67	Lou Watson	18–8	10–4
1972–73	Bob Knight	22–6	11–3
1973–74	Bob Knight	23–5	12–2
1974–75	Bob Knight	31–1	18–0
1975–76	Bob Knight	32–0	18–0
1979–80	Bob Knight	21–8	13–5
1980–81	Bob Knight	26–9	14–4
1982–83	Bob Knight	24–6	13–5
1986–87	Bob Knight	30–4	15–3
1988–89	Bob Knight	27–8	15–3
1990–91	Bob Knight	29–5	15–3
1992–93	Bob Knight	31–4	17–1
2001–02	Mike Davis	25–12	11–5
2012–13	Tom Crean	29–7	14–4
2015–16	Tom Crean	27–8	15–3
Big Ten regular season championships			22

== Tournament titles ==
Season	Tournament	Results
1939–40	NCAA Championship	W vs. Springfield 48–24; W vs. Duquesne 39–30; W vs. Kansas 60–42
1952–53	NCAA Championship	W vs. DePaul 82–80; W vs. Notre Dame 79–66; W vs. LSU 80–67; W vs. Kansas 69–68
1973–74	CCAT	W vs. Tennessee 73–71; W vs. Toledo 73–7; W vs. USC 83–76
1975–76	NCAA Championship	W vs. St. John's 90–70; W vs. Alabama 74–69; W vs. Marquette 65–56; W vs. UCLA 65–51; W vs. Michigan 86–68
1978–79	NIT	W vs. Texas Tech 78–59; W vs. Alcorn State 72–68; W vs. Ohio State 64–55; W vs. Purdue 53–52
1980–81	NCAA Championship	W vs. Maryland 99–64; W vs. UAB 87–72; W vs. St. Joseph's 78–46; W vs. LSU 67–49; W vs. North Carolina 63–50
1986–87	NCAA Championship	W vs. Fairfield 92–58; W vs. Auburn 107–90; W vs. Duke 88–82; W vs. LSU 77–76; W vs. UNLV 97–93; W vs. Syracuse 74–73
2002–03	Maui Invitational	W vs. UMass 84–71; W vs. Gonzaga 76–75; W vs. Virginia 70–63
2012–13	Legends Classic	W vs. Georgia 66–53; W vs. Georgetown 82–72

== Key statistics ==
Overall
Years of basketball	126
First season	1900–01
Head coaches (all-time)	31
All games
All-time record	1,974–1,144 (.633)
Home record	1,154–339 (.773)
20+ win seasons	38
30+ win seasons	4
Conference games
Conference record	1,000–757 (.569)
Conference regular season championships	22
Conference tournament championships	0
NCAA Tournament
NCAA Tournament appearances	41
NCAA Tournament wins	68
Sweet Sixteens	22
Elite Eights	11
Final Fours	8
Championship games	6
Championships	5
Accurate as of 11/20/2026.

=== Rankings ===
Indiana teams have spent a total of 54 weeks ranked number 1, most recently in 2013.

The Associated Press began its basketball poll on January 20, 1949. The following is a summary of those annual polls. Starting in the 1961–62 season, AP provided a preseason (PS) poll. AP did a post-tournament poll in 1953, 1954, 1974 and 1975. The following table summarizes Indiana history in the AP Poll:

Year	Preseason	Peak	Final	Weeks ranked	Weeks @ #1
Top 20 Poll
1949–50	NA	4	20	8/10	0
1950–51	NA	3	7	12/12	0
1951–52	NA	4	NR	10/13	0
1952–53	NA	1	1	14/14	3
1953–54	NA	1	4	15/15	3
1954–55	NA	6	NR	2/14	0
1955–56	NA	12	NR	4/15	0
1956–57	NA	10	NR	3/14	0
1957–58	NA	12	12	1/14	0
1958–59	NA	15	NR	4/14	0
1959–60	NA	7	7	6/12	0
1960–61	NA	4	NR	3/13	0
Top 10 Poll
1962–63	NR	8	NR	1/16	0
1964–65	NR	2	NR	10/15	0
1967–68	NR	3	NR	3/16	0
Top 20 Poll
1970–71	16	11	NR	9/16	0
1971–72	NR	8	17	7/16	0
1972–73	NR	4	6	14/16	0
1973–74	3	3	9	18/18	0
1974–75	3	1	3	19/19	11
1975–76	1	1	1	17/17	17
1976–77	5	4	NR	4/17	0
1977–78	NR	11	13	4/17	0
1978–79	10	10	NR	2/17	0
1979–80	1	1	7	14/15	3
1980–81	5	5	9	12/16	0
1981–82	12	10	NR	7/16	0
1982–83	9	1	5	18/18	2
1983–84	19	17	NR	2/17	0
1984–85	4	4	NR	10/17	0
1985–86	NR	15	16	12/17	0
1986–87	3	2	3	16/16	0
1987–88	6	5	NR	9/17	0
1988–89	NR	3	8	10/18	0
Top 25 Poll
1989–90	14	9	NR	13/17	0
1990–91	8	3	3	17/17	0
1991–92	2	2	5	18/18	0
1992–93	4	1	1	18/18	5
1993–94	12	8	18	18/18	0
1994–95	9	9	NR	4/18	0
1995–96	23	23	NR	2/18	0
1996–97	NR	8	NR	15/18	0
1997–98	17	17	NR	4/18	0
1998–99	22	8	19	18/18	0
1999–00	NR	9	22	15/18	0
2000–01	NR	20	20	1/18	0
2001–02	22	20	NR	8/18	0
2002–03	21	6	NR	12/19	0
2005–06	24	9	NR	14/19	0
2006–07	NR	23	NR	2/19	0
2007–08	9	7	NR	19/20	0
2011–12	NR	7	16	14/19	0
2012–13	1	1	4	19/19	10
2014–15	NR	22	NR	2/19	0
2015–16	15	10	14	12/19	0
2016–17	11	3	NR	9/19	0
2018–19	NR	21	NR	6/19	0
2022–23	13	10	21	16/19	0
2024–25	17	14	NR	4/19	0
2025–26	NR	19	NR	2/19	0

=== Victories over AP number 1 teams ===
Indiana has eight victories over the AP number one ranked team, including the 2011 Kentucky upset.

- Mar. 22, 1984 – NR IU 73, No. 1 North Carolina 68 (Omni Coliseum, Atlanta, Georgia)
- Mar. 28, 1987 – No. 3 IU 97, No. 1 UNLV 93 (Louisiana Superdome, New Orleans, Louisiana)
- Dec. 4, 1993 – No. 11 IU 96, No. 1 Kentucky, 84 (Hoosier Dome, Indianapolis, Indiana)
- Jan. 7, 2001 – NR IU 59, No. 1 Michigan State 58 (Assembly Hall, Bloomington, Indiana)
- Mar. 21, 2002 – NR IU 74, No. 1 Duke 73 (Rupp Arena, Lexington, Kentucky)
- Dec. 10, 2011 – NR IU 73, No. 1 Kentucky 72 (Assembly Hall, Bloomington, Indiana)
- Feb. 2, 2013 – No. 3 IU 81, No. 1 Michigan 73 (Assembly Hall, Bloomington, Indiana)
- Feb. 4, 2023 - No. 21 IU 79, No. 1 Purdue 74 (Simon Skjodt Assembly Hall, Bloomington, Indiana)

== Radio network affiliates ==
City	Call sign	Frequency
Batesville, Indiana	WRBI-FM	103.9
Bedford, Indiana	WQRK-FM	105.5
Bloomington, Indiana	WHCC-FM	105.1
Boonville, Indiana	WBNL-AM	1540
Columbus, Indiana	WXCH-FM	102.9
Evansville, Indiana	WEOA-AM/FM	1400/98.5
Fort Wayne, Indiana	WGL-AM/FM	1250/102.9
French Lick, Indiana	WFLQ-FM	100.1
Hammond, Indiana	WJOB-AM	1230
Indianapolis, Indiana	WFNI-AM/FM	1070/107.5
Indianapolis, Indiana	WIBC-FM	93.1
Jasper, Indiana	WITZ-FM	104.7
Jeffersonville, Indiana/Louisville, Kentucky	WXVW-AM	1450
Kendallville, Indiana	WAWK-AM/FM	1140/95.5
Kokomo, Indiana	WIOU-AM	1350
Ligonier, Indiana	WAOR-FM	102.7
Linton, Indiana	WQTY-FM	93.3
Loogootee, Indiana	WRZR-FM	94.5
Madison, Indiana	WXGO/WORX-AM/FM	1270/96.7
Marion, Indiana	WBAT-AM	1400
Michigan City, Indiana	WEFM-FM	95.9
Mount Vernon, Indiana	WMVI-FM	106.7
Portland, Indiana	WPGW/WPGW-AM/FM	1440/100.9
Richmond, Indiana	WHON-AM/FM	930/101.7
Richmond, Indiana	WQLK-FM	96.1
Rockville, Indiana/Terre Haute, Indiana	WAXI-FM	104.9
Salem, Indiana	WSLM/WSLM-AM/FM	1220/97.9
Seymour, Indiana	WXKU-FM	92.7
South Bend, Indiana	WHME-FM	103.1
Tell City, Indiana	WTCJ-AM/FM	1230/91.5
Vincennes, Indiana	WAOV/WZDM-AM/FM	1450/92.1

== See also ==
- Indiana Hoosiers women's basketball
- NCAA Division I men's basketball tournament records
- NCAA Men's Division I Final Four appearances by coaches
- NCAA Men's Division I Final Four appearances by school
- NCAA Division I men's basketball tournament consecutive appearances
- NCAA Division I men's basketball tournament all-time team records
