= Jay Edwards (basketball) =

American basketball player (born 1969)

Personal information
- Born: January 3, 1969 (age 57) Muncie, Indiana, U.S.
- Listed height: 6 ft 4 in (1.93 m)
- Listed weight: 185 lb (84 kg)

Career information
- High school: Marion (Marion, Indiana)
- College: Indiana (1987–1989)
- NBA draft: 1989: 2nd round, 33rd overall pick
- Drafted by: Los Angeles Clippers
- Playing career: 1989–2001
- Position: Shooting guard
- Number: 3

Career history
- 1989–1991: Los Angeles Clippers
- 1991: Rapid City Thrillers
- 1991–1992: Fort Wayne Fury
- 1993: Argal Huesca
- 1993: Fort Wayne Fury
- 1993–1994: Rochester Renegade
- 1994–1995: Rockford Lightning
- 1995–1996: Fort Wayne Fury
- 1996: Connecticut Pride
- 1996–1997: Yakima Sun Kings
- 1997–2000: Elitzur Ashkelon
- 2001: Gimnasia de Comodoro

Career highlights
- Consensus second-team All-American (1989); Big Ten Player of the Year (1989); Big Ten Freshman of the Year (1988); Second-team Parade All-American (1987); Co-Indiana Mr. Basketball (1987); McDonald's All-American (1987)
- Stats at NBA.com
- Stats at Basketball Reference

Jay Edwards (born January 3, 1969) is an American former professional basketball player.

Edwards was selected by the Los Angeles Clippers in the second round (33rd overall) of the 1989 NBA draft. A 6'4" guard from Indiana University, Edwards played in only four games for the Clippers in his NBA career. He also played overseas for a few seasons.

He entered the NBA after playing only two seasons for the Hoosiers. During his sophomore year at Indiana, he averaged 20.0 points per game and once held the school record for 20 consecutive games with a three-pointer , leading the Hoosiers to the 1989 Big Ten title. Edwards was the Big Ten Freshman of the Year in 1988 and an All-American in 1989.

When Edwards was in high school in Marion, Indiana, he and his teammate, Lyndon Jones, led the Marion Giants to three consecutive state championships. The three-peat was known in Indiana as the "Purple Reign" referring to the schools colors of purple and gold. In 1987 Edwards shared the title of Indiana's "Mr. Basketball" award along with Jones. Edwards and Jones would also play together for two years at Indiana University.

In high school, Jay was given the nickname "Silk" for his gracefully smooth jump shot.

Edwards continues to hold the NCAA freshman single-season record for three-point field goal shooting percentage (53.6%).
