= Lou Watson =

American basketball player and coach

Louis C. Watson (August 31, 1924 – May 24, 2012) was an American basketball player and coach for Indiana University. The 6'-5" Watson played for Jeffersonville High School in Jeffersonville, Indiana, graduating in 1943. He was a four-year letterman, starting every game of his career. He competed for the Hoosiers from 1947 to 1950, and was their leading scorer and a first-team All-Big Ten honoree in 1950. After serving as freshman and assistant varsity basketball coach at Indiana, Watson was Indiana's head coach from 1965 to 1971. He led the Hoosiers to a Big Ten co-championship in 1967, finishing with a 62–60 record. In 1971, he stepped down from head coaching to become a special assistant to the athletic director. He retired from that position in 1987. On May 25, 2012, Watson died at the age of 88 in Fairfax, Virginia.
