= Bill Scott (basketball) =

American basketball player, coach, and athletics administrator

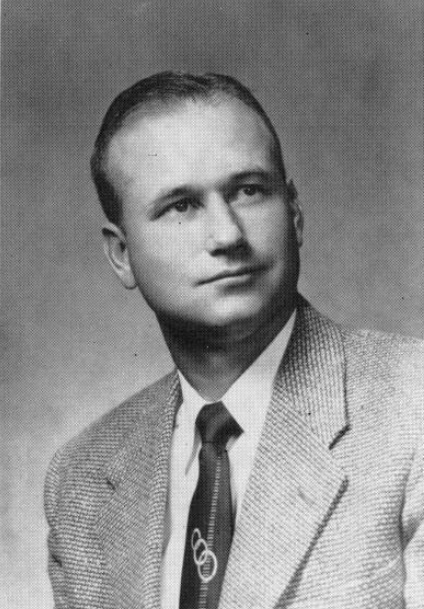
- Scott from the 1958 Bronco

Playing career
- 1944–1947: Hardin–Simmons

Coaching career (HC unless noted)
- 1951–1962: Hardin–Simmons

Head coaching record
- Overall: 129–161 (.445)
- Tournaments: NCAA: 0–2 (.000)

Accomplishments and honors

Championships
- BIAA Champions (1953)

Bill Scott was a college men's basketball coach and athletics administrator. He was the head coach of Hardin–Simmons from 1951 to 1962. He coached Hardin–Simmons to a 129–161 record, winning one Border Intercollegiate Athletic Association championship and two NCAA tournament appearances. He was inducted into the Hardin–Simmons athletics Hall of Fame in 1982.

== Head coaching record ==
Statistics overview
Season	Team	Overall	Conference	Standing	Postseason
Hardin–Simmons Cowboys (Border Intercollegiate Athletic Association) (1951–1962)
1951–52	Hardin–Simmons	17–15	5–9	T-6th	
1952–53	Hardin–Simmons	19–12	11–3	T-1st	NCAA first round
1953–54	Hardin–Simmons	7–17	4–8	T-4th	
1954–55	Hardin–Simmons	9–15	4–8	5th	
1955–56	Hardin–Simmons	7–18	3–9	7th	
1956–57	Hardin–Simmons	17–9	7–3	2nd	NCAA first round
1957–58	Hardin–Simmons	11–14	4–6	T-4th	
1958–59	Hardin–Simmons	14–12	3–7	5th	
1959–60	Hardin–Simmons	8–18	3–7	5th	
1960–61	Hardin–Simmons	12–14	2–8	5th	
1961–62	Hardin–Simmons	8–17	1–7	5th	
Hardin–Simmons:		129–161 (.445)	47–75 (.385)		
Total:		129–161 (.445)			
National champion Postseason invitational champion Conference regular season champion Conference regular season and conference tournament champion Division regular season champion Division regular season and conference tournament champion Conference tournament champion
