= B. H. Born =

American basketball center (1932–2013)

Personal information
- Born: June 6, 1932 Osawatomie, Kansas, U.S.
- Died: February 3, 2013 (aged 80) Peoria, Illinois, U.S.
- Listed height: 6 ft 9 in (2.06 m)
- Listed weight: 205 lb (93 kg)

Career information
- High school: Medicine Lodge (Medicine Lodge, Kansas)
- College: Kansas (1951–1954)
- NBA draft: 1954: 3rd round, 22nd overall pick
- Drafted by: Fort Wayne Pistons
- Playing career: 1954–1959
- Position: Center
- Number: 23 (1951–52); 25 (1952–54)

Career history
- 1954–1959: Peoria Caterpillars

Career highlights
- NCAA final Four Most Outstanding Player (1953); NCAA champion (1952); Jersey retired by Kansas Jayhawks; 2× AAU All-American (1957, 1958); 2x AAU champion (1954, 1958)
- Stats at Basketball Reference
Medals
Representing United States
World Championships
Gold medal – first place	1954 Rio de Janeiro	USA

Bertram H. "B. H." Born (June 6, 1932 – February 3, 2013) was an American basketball center. After graduating from Medicine Lodge High School in 1950, he played for the Kansas Jayhawks from 1951 to 1954.

== College career ==
During the 1951–52 season, in which Kansas earned a berth in the championship game of the NCAA tournament, Born was a reserve behind Clyde Lovellette, averaging 1.6 points per game. The following season, he had 18.9 points per game for the Jayhawks as the team reached the NCAA tournament final. Indiana defeated Kansas 69–68 in the championship game, but Born won the tournament's Most Outstanding Player award. During the final, Born scored 26 points, compiled 15 rebounds, and blocked 13 shots.

== International and AAU career ==
Born posted an average of 19 points per game in the 1953–54 season, and competed for the U.S. national team in the 1954 FIBA World Championship. At that tournament, he scored 10.4 points per game in nine appearances and had a 12-point performance in a 62–41 U.S. win over Brazil that clinched the gold medal for the American team. The Fort Wayne Pistons selected Born with the 22nd overall pick of the 1954 NBA draft. However, he did not join the team. In the mid-1950s, he played for the Peoria Caterpillars Amateur Athletic Union (AAU) team, and he was named an AAU All-American in 1957 and 1958. With Born, the Caterpillars won the AAU championship twice. In addition, he helped the Jayhawks recruit Wilt Chamberlain, a leading high school player at the time. In Peoria, Illinois, Born was employed with Caterpillar Inc.'s tractor business for 43 years.

== Honors ==
In 1992, the inaugural year for the honor, the University of Kansas retired the number 23 jersey in Born's honor. Some time after that Kansas changed it to the number 25 jersey. Born has also been inducted into the Kansas Sports Hall of Fame.

== Death ==
Born died on February 3, 2013, in Peoria.
