= LaVannes Squires =

African-American basketball pioneer (1931–2021)

LaVannes C. Squires (1931 – February 19, 2021) was the first African-American to play basketball at the University of Kansas during the 1951-1954 seasons, which made him a part of the 1952 National Championship team. LaVannes was the son of Arthur and Charlotte Squires and is the eighth of twelve children, born in Hartsdale, Missouri in 1931.

== Early life ==
LaVannes father, Arthur, died when LaVannes was only 3 years old and he also lost three of his siblings due to poor health issues; his mother had only received an education as far as the fifth grade. Squires said his mother had immense pride which showed in her stern opposition toward handouts of any nature; she continued to work harder and harder, eventually their lives got better. His mother remarried but later divorced and moved to Planeview, Kansas from Oklahoma to work in manufacturing plants during World War II to produce war supplies; after the war they moved to Planeview, Kansas. Attributing to his mother and her hard work ethic, LaVannes developed hard working skills through filling coal bins for people, working in a wheat field, doing construction, and digging graves in a cemetery.

== Academics and athletics ==
During the 1940s, Squires looked youthful, stood barely over six feet tall, and weighed about 180 pounds; however as a teenager he was very meager. At the time of his senior year at Wichita East High School, LaVannes was still very small but a good athlete; he earned the nickname “Felix the Cat” from his peers due to his quickness and slender appearance. His high school was well integrated, the black students held positions on the student council and were a part of the cheer team; however, this sparked riots among the students. In the classroom and on the basketball court, Squires was making a reputation for himself. Squires was the captain of the basketball team at Wichita East where he played guard and forward. He earned All-City and All-State honors and graduated in the top ten percent of his graduating class. Squires received university scholarship offers for his athletic and academic abilities; in 1950 he accepted a basketball scholarship from the University of Kansas. He became the university's first African-American athletic star and basketball player. LaVannes was the first in his family to go to college and, except for his brother who was in the armed services, to graduate from high school.

During the years that Squires was an undergrad at the University of Kansas, he was a part of the Black fraternity Alpha Phi Alpha and the Owl Society, which was an honorary organization for junior men. Alpha Phi Alpha was the first Black fraternity on the University of Kansas campus which was named the Upsilon chapter and founded on December 2, 1917. The fraternity chapter has many traditions and legacies that follow through the generations such as their slogan, “Higher Scholastic Attainment”. As a basketball player, Squires was awarded a Freshman Basketball Award for the 1950-1951 season. He was on the varsity team and held the on court basketball position of guard; he became a valuable talent for the team during the 1952 National Championship. Coach Phog Allen said that Squires in his first game “shows fine early coaching and has a lot of fire, enthusiasm and ability. If he continues to improve as he has in the past few weeks he’ll play a lot for us.” According to Coach Allen, he was well-liked by the team and the crowd also.

As Coach Allen had stated in the LJWorld, the media guide for the 1951-1952 Basketball season backed him up, it said that Squires was a better than average prospect who played for Ralph Miller at Wichita East, a former KU great. Squires was living up to his high school nickname, being called “clever” and a “quick ball-handler” but needed to work on his aggressiveness. In 1952, Squires was 6 foot 6 inches tall and a nifty shooter which helped the Jayhawks to their first NCAA title in a substitute role during that year. However, a lung ailment fell upon him, which took him out of the hunt to be put on the starting roster for the 1953 season. This was seen as a loss that would detrimentally hurt the team in factors such as speed, aggressiveness, and defense which Squires was known for helping out immensely in these areas. Squires received his letter “K” during the 1953-1954 season. Coach Allen came under fire in 1953 from sports editor Jim Hall when he left Squires at home in Lawrence when the Jayhawks were set to play Tulane and LSU. The prestigious Jayhawks lost both games and their prestige by bending over to Southern Jim Crow laws.

== After college ==
LaVannes Squires graduated from the University of Kansas in 1954 with a Bachelor of Science in Business degree with a major in business administration. He again, just like in high school, graduated in the top ten percent of his graduating class. Squires ended up working for the “Look” Magazine Subscription Office in Des Moines as a junior accountant. A friend of the Kansas men's basketball team, who managed the office, hired Squires. He later moved on after a year and a half in which he moved up the ladder in the accounting department of the magazine office to an assistant and then later on to the manager.

== Career ==
Squires was the President of the Bank of Finance which celebrated its tenth anniversary on November 16, 1974; he fixed the bank to make it more fiscally sound and able to abide to business policies. The bank had 1,300 stockholders which for the first time on August 29, 1974 received their first check that represented the first share paid by the Bank to its holders. He started as the Chief Executive at Bank of Finance in 1964; employed 68 employees when the bank was ranked at number seven in “Black Enterprise: Top 100” in 1975. The “Black Enterprise” list in June 1975 was the third time that the magazine had compiled a list of the 100 largest “black-owned and/or black managed businesses in the United States.” Despite the original growing pains the Bank had to endure in order to become a good business, it still prides itself on the ideal to fill in the economic gaps that existed in the black community. The Bank of Finance had provided financial assistance for the “creation of medical centers, day care centers, homes for the aged, and a greater number of multiple-unit housing complexes.” They return the money to the local community that they earn from the businesses in the form of payroll purchases.

Before the success of the Bank of Finance, Squires was with the Douglass State Bank in Kansas City, Kansas as a teller for ten years after his accounting job with the magazine. He moved up to Executive Vice-President and then later formed a bank with four other men called the Swope Parkway National Bank in Kansas City, Missouri. The bank opened in July, 1968 amounted up to $14.5 million while he was there and he later moved on to San Diego where another bank was being planned. Edward Tillmon, the past president of the Bank of Finance, brought Squires to the bank as Executive Vice-President.

At a point around the 70s, Squires opened up a real estate company called, L.C. SQUIRES REAL ESTATE COMPANY, INC. in Los Angeles but it was suspended in 1982.

Squires died on February 19, 2021, at age 90, in Pasadena, California.
