= Don Schlundt =

American basketball player

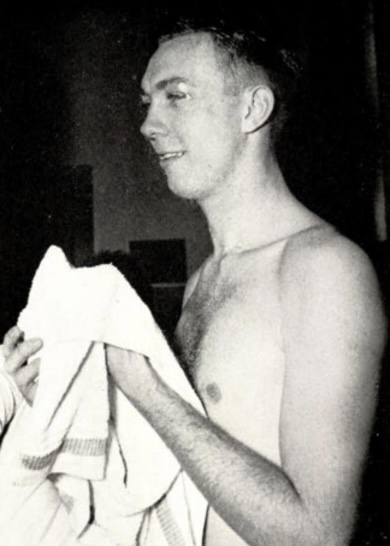
- Schlundt as a junior at Indiana

Personal information
- Born: March 15, 1933 St. Joseph County, Indiana, U.S.
- Died: October 10, 1985 (aged 52) Indianapolis, Indiana, U.S.
- Listed height: 6 ft 10 in (2.08 m)
- Listed weight: 225 lb (102 kg)

Career information
- High school: Clay (South Bend, Indiana)
- College: Indiana (1951–1955)
- NBA draft: 1955: 2nd round, 16th overall pick
- Drafted by: Syracuse Nationals
- Position: Center

Career highlights
- NCAA champion (1953); Consensus first-team All-American (1954); 2× Consensus second-team All-American (1953, 1955); 3× First-team All-Big Ten (1953–1955)
- Stats at Basketball Reference

Don Schlundt (March 15, 1933 — October 10, 1985) was an American college basketball player. He was born in St. Joseph County, Indiana, to Martin and Anna (née Bodtke) Schlundt. He died in Indianapolis.

== Collegiate career ==
Schlundt, a 6'9 center, played collegiately at Indiana University after a standout high school career at Washington Clay High School in South Bend, Indiana. He played for the Hoosiers from 1951 to 1955. Freshmen were eligible to play college basketball in 1951 due to the Korean War, making Schlundt one of the hundreds of 1950s-era players to compete for four varsity seasons. Schlundt led the Hoosiers to the 1953 National Championship.

Schlundt was named an All-American in 1953, 1954 and 1955. He left IU as the school's all-time leading scorer with 2,192 points - a mark that stood for 32 years until Steve Alford broke it. Following the completion of his collegiate career, Schlundt decided to pursue a career in business instead of professional basketball after completing his college education.

He was elected to the Indiana University athletics Hall of Fame in 1982 and is also a member of the Indiana Basketball Hall of Fame. Schlundt died of cancer on October 10, 1985.

== See also ==
- List of NCAA Division I men's basketball career free throw scoring leaders
