= 1953 NCAA basketball tournament =

Edition of USA college basketball tournament

- Season: 1952–53
- Teams: 22
- Finals site: Municipal Auditorium, Kansas City, Missouri
- Champions: Indiana Hoosiers (2nd title, 2nd title game, 2nd Final Four)
- Runner-up: Kansas Jayhawks (3rd title game, 3rd Final Four)
- Semifinalists: Washington Huskies (3rd) (1st Final Four); LSU Tigers (4th) (1st Final Four)
- Winning coach: Branch McCracken (2nd title)
- MOP: B. H. Born (Kansas)
- Attendance: 127,149
- Top scorer: Bob Houbregs (Washington) (139 points)

The 1953 NCAA basketball tournament involved 22 schools playing in single-elimination play to determine the national champion of NCAA college basketball. The 15th annual edition of the tournament began on March 10, 1953, and ended with the championship game on March 18, at the Municipal Auditorium in Kansas City, Missouri. A total of 26 games were played, including a third-place game in each region and a national third-place game.

Indiana, coached by Branch McCracken, won the tournament title with a 69–68 victory in the final game over Kansas, coached by Phog Allen. B. H. Born of Kansas was named the tournament's Most Outstanding Player. The Hoosiers became the third team, after Oklahoma A&M in 1945–46 and Kentucky in 1948–49, to win two titles and the second of three teams to win titles in their first two tournament appearances (after Oklahoma A&M); however, unlike Oklahoma A&M before them and San Francisco after, their first two tournament appearances were 13 years apart.

== Locations ==
The following are the sites selected to host each round of the 1953 tournament:

=== East-1 Region ===
First round (March 10)
The Palestra, Philadelphia, Pennsylvania (Hosts: University of Pennsylvania, Ivy League)

East-1 Regional (March 13 and 14)
Reynolds Coliseum, Raleigh, North Carolina (Host: North Carolina State University)

=== East-2 Region ===
First round (March 10)
Allen County War Memorial Coliseum, Fort Wayne, Indiana (Host: Big Ten Conference)

East-2 Regional (March 12 and 13)
Chicago Stadium, Chicago, Illinois (Hosts: Loyola University Chicago, DePaul University)

=== West-1 Region ===
West-1 Regional (March 12 and 13)
Ahearn Field House, Manhattan, Kansas (Host: Kansas State University)

=== West-2 Region ===
First round (March 10)
Hec Edmundson Pavilion, Seattle, Washington (Host: University of Washington)
Stanford Pavilion, Palo Alto, California (Host: Stanford University)

West-2 Regional (March 13 and 14)
Oregon State Coliseum, Corvallis, Oregon (Host: Oregon State University)

=== Final Four ===
March 17 and 18
Municipal Auditorium, Kansas City, Missouri (Host: Missouri Valley Conference)

== Teams ==
Region	Team	Coach	Conference	Finished	Final Opponent	Score
East
East	DePaul	Ray Meyer	Independent	Regional Fourth Place	Penn	L 90–70
East	Eastern Kentucky	Paul McBrayer	Ohio Valley	First round	Notre Dame	L 72–57
East	Fordham	Johnny Bach	Metro NY	First round	Lebanon Valley	L 80–67
East	Holy Cross	Buster Sheary	Independent	Elite Eight	LSU	L 81–73
East	Indiana	Branch McCracken	Big Ten	Champion	Kansas	W 69–68
East	Lebanon Valley	Rinso Marquette	Independent	Regional Fourth Place	Wake Forest	L 91–71
East	LSU	Harry Rabenhorst	Southeastern	Fourth Place	Washington	L 88–69
East	Miami (OH)	Bill Rohr	Mid-American	First round	DePaul	L 74–72
East	Navy	Ben Carnevale	Independent	First round	Holy Cross	L 87–74
East	Notre Dame	John Jordan	Independent	Elite Eight	Indiana	L 79–66
East	Penn	Howie Dallmar	Ivy League	Regional third place	DePaul	W 90–70
East	Wake Forest	Murray Greason	Southern	Regional third place	Lebanon Valley	W 91–71
West
West	Hardin–Simmons	Bill Scott	Border	First round	Santa Clara	L 81–56
West	Idaho State	Steve Belko	Independent	First round	Seattle	L 88–77
West	Kansas	Phog Allen	Big 7	Runner Up	Indiana	L 69–68
West	Oklahoma City	Doyle Parrack	Independent	Regional Fourth Place	TCU	L 58–56
West	Oklahoma A&M	Henry Iba	Missouri Valley	Elite Eight	Kansas	L 61–55
West	Santa Clara	Bob Feerick	CBA	Elite Eight	Washington	L 74–62
West	Seattle	Al Brightman	Independent	Regional third place	Wyoming	W 80–64
West	TCU	Buster Brannon	Southwest	Regional third place	Oklahoma City	W 58–56
West	Washington	Tippy Dye	Pacific Coast	Third Place	LSU	W 88–69
West	Wyoming	Everett Shelton	Mountain States	Regional Fourth Place	Seattle	L 80–64

== Bracket ==
=== East-1 Region—Raleigh ===
First Round; March 10
Philadelphia
Lebanon Valley	80
Fordham	67
Philadelphia
Holy Cross	87
Navy	74

Regional Semifinals; March 13
LSU	89
Lebanon Valley	76
Wake Forest	71
Holy Cross	79

Regional Finals; March 14
LSU	81
Holy Cross	73
Third place
Lebanon Valley	71
Wake Forest	91

=== East-2 Region—Chicago ===
First Round; March 10
Fort Wayne, IN
Notre Dame	72
Eastern Kentucky	57
Fort Wayne, IN
DePaul	74
Miami (OH)	72

Regional Semifinals; March 13
Penn	57
Notre Dame	69
Indiana	82
DePaul	80

Regional Finals; March 14
Notre Dame	66
Indiana	79
Third place
Penn	90
DePaul	70

=== West-1 Region—Manhattan, Kansas ===
Regional Semifinals; March 13
Oklahoma A&M	71
TCU	54
Kansas	73
Oklahoma City	65

Regional Finals; March 14
Oklahoma A&M	55
Kansas	61
Third place
TCU	58
Oklahoma City	56

=== West-2 Region—Corvallis, Oregon ===
First Round; March 10
Seattle
Seattle	88
Idaho State	77
Palo Alto, CA
Santa Clara	81
Hardin–Simmons	56

Regional Semifinals; March 13
Washington	92
Seattle	70
Wyoming	52
Santa Clara	67

Regional Finals; March 14
Washington	74
Santa Clara	62
Third place
Seattle	80
Wyoming	64

=== Final Four—Kansas City ===
National Semifinals; March 17
LSU	67
Indiana	80
Kansas	79
Washington	53

National Championship; March 18
Indiana	69
Kansas	68
National Third Place
LSU	69
Washington	88

== See also ==
- 1953 National Invitation Tournament
- 1953 NAIA Basketball Tournament

== Notes ==
- As would be expected with the expanded field, a then-record ten teams - Eastern Kentucky, Fordham, Hardin-Simmons, Idaho State, Lebanon Valley, LSU, Miami University, Notre Dame, Penn and Seattle - made their tournament debut. The record would be broken in 1955 with eleven new teams, and again in 1981 with twelve newcomers.
- Lebanon Valley College, at 425 students, would become by far the smallest school to ever field a team, as well as win a game, in the NCAA tournament. Following the 1956 split of the NCAA into University and College divisions, as well as the subsequent split into the current three division format, it is most likely that this record will never be broken. This would be LVC's only appearance in the tournament; they are also the only team from the tournament to not play in the tournament again.
