= 1952–53 NCAA men's basketball season =

Men's university basketball season

- Preseason AP No. 1: None
- NCAA Tournament: 1953
- Tournament dates: March 10 – 18, 1953
- National Championship: Municipal Auditorium; Kansas City, Missouri
- NCAA Champions: Indiana Hoosiers
- Helms National Champions: Indiana Hoosiers
- Other champions: Seton Hall Pirates (NIT)
- Player of the Year (Helms): Bob Houbregs, Washington Huskies

The 1952–53 NCAA men's basketball season began in December 1952, progressed through the regular season and conference tournaments, and concluded with the 1953 NCAA basketball tournament championship game on March 18, 1953, at Municipal Auditorium in Kansas City, Missouri. The Indiana Hoosiers won their second NCAA national championship with a 69–68 victory over the Kansas Jayhawks.

== Rule changes ==
Teams must take a free throw after a foul, as had been the practice through the 1938–39 season. Previously, under a rule that had been in effect since the 1939–40 season, a team could waive its free throw and instead take the ball at mid-court after a foul.

== Season headlines ==
- Prior to the season, the NCAA ruled that colleges and universities could no longer count games played against non-collegiate opponents in their annual won-loss records. Previously, it had been a common practice for many years for colleges and universities to include non-collegiate opponents in their schedules, with the games recognized as part of their official record for the season.
- The California Basketball Association began play, with five original members. It would be renamed the West Coast Athletic Conference in 1956 and the West Coast Conference in 1989.
- The NCAA forced Kentucky to suspend its men's basketball program for the entire 1952–53 season as a result of the CCNY point-shaving scandal, which had been revealed in 1951.
- The NCAA tournament expanded from 16 to 22 teams.
- Bill Chambers of William and Mary grabbed 51 rebounds against Virginia on February 14, 1953, becoming the first player with more than 50 rebounds in one game.
- Bob Houbregs of Washington became the first player to score 40 or more points in an NCAA tournament Final Four game when he scored 42 against LSU in the national third-place game on March 18, 1953.
- Walter Dukes of Seton Hall finished the season with 734 rebounds for the year, the first player to grab 700 rebounds in a single season.

== Season outlook ==
=== Pre-season polls ===
The Top 20 from the AP Poll and the UP Coaches Poll during the pre-season.

Associated Press
Ranking	Team
1	La Salle
2	Kansas State
3	Illinois
4	Seton Hall
5	Oklahoma A&M
6	NC State
7	Notre Dame
8	Holy Cross
9	Washington
10	LSU
11	Western Kentucky State
12	UCLA
13	Oklahoma City
14	St. Bonaventure
15	Tulsa
16	Minnesota
17	Saint Louis
18	California
19	Indiana
20 (tie)	Navy
20 (tie)	Kansas

UP Coaches
Ranking	Team
1	Illinois
2	Kansas State
3	La Salle
4	Washington
5	NC State
6	Oklahoma A&M
7	UCLA
8	Indiana
9	Seton Hall
10	Saint Louis
11	Holy Cross
12	Santa Clara
13	Notre Dame
14	Duquesne
15	Wyoming
16	St. John's
17 (tie)	BYU
17 (tie)	Minnesota
19	Kansas
20	St. Bonaventure

== Conference membership changes ==
School	Former conference	New conference
Evansville Purple Aces	Ohio Valley Conference	Non-major basketball program
Marshall Thundering Herd	Ohio Valley Conference	Independent
Middle Tennessee Blue Raiders	Non-major basketball program	Ohio Valley Conference
Pacific Tigers	Non-major basketball program	California Basketball Association
Saint Mary's Gaels	Independent	California Basketball Association
San Francisco Dons	Independent	California Basketball Association
San Jose State Spartans	Non-major basketball program	California Basketball Association
Santa Clara Broncos	Independent	California Basketball Association

== Regular season ==
=== Conferences ===
==== Conference winners and tournaments ====
Conference	Regular season winner	Conference player of the year	Conference tournament	Tournament venue (City)	Tournament winner
Big Seven Conference	Kansas	None selected	No Tournament		
Big Ten Conference	Indiana	None selected	No Tournament		
Border Conference	Arizona & Hardin-Simmons		No Tournament		
California Basketball Association	Santa Clara	None selected	No Tournament		
Eastern Intercollegiate Basketball League	Penn	None selected	No Tournament		
Metropolitan New York Conference	Manhattan		No Tournament		
Mid-American Conference	Miami (OH)	None selected	No Tournament		
Missouri Valley Conference	Oklahoma A&M	None selected	No Tournament		
Mountain States (Skyline) Conference	Wyoming		No Tournament		
Ohio Valley Conference	Eastern Kentucky State	None selected	1953 Ohio Valley Conference men's basketball tournament	Jefferson County Armory (Louisville, Kentucky)	Western Kentucky State
Pacific Coast Conference	Washington (North); California (South)		No Tournament; Washington defeated California in best-of-three conference championship playoff series		
Southeastern Conference	LSU	None selected	No Tournament		
Southern Conference	NC State	Frank Selvy, Furman	1953 Southern Conference men's basketball tournament	Reynolds Coliseum (Raleigh, North Carolina)	Wake Forest
Southwest Conference	TCU	None selected	No Tournament		
Western New York Little Three Conference	Niagara		No Tournament		
Yankee Conference	Connecticut	None selected	No Tournament		

==== Conference standings ====
1952–53 Big Seven Conference men's basketball standings
	Conf.				Overall
Team	W		L	PCT	W		L	PCT
No. 3 Kansas	10	–	2	.833	19	–	6	.760
No. 12 Kansas State	9	–	3	.750	17	–	4	.810
Missouri	6	–	6	.500	11	–	9	.550
Iowa State	5	–	7	.417	10	–	11	.476
Oklahoma	5	–	7	.417	8	–	13	.381
Nebraska	4	–	8	.333	9	–	11	.450
Colorado	3	–	9	.250	10	–	11	.476
Rankings from AP Poll

1952–53 Big Ten Conference men's basketball standings
	Conf.				Overall
Team	W		L	PCT	W		L	PCT
No. 1 Indiana	17	–	1	.944	23	–	3	.885
No. 11 Illinois	14	–	4	.778	18	–	4	.818
Minnesota	11	–	7	.611	14	–	8	.636
Michigan State	11	–	7	.611	13	–	9	.591
Wisconsin	10	–	8	.556	13	–	9	.591
Iowa	9	–	9	.500	12	–	10	.545
Ohio State	7	–	11	.389	10	–	12	.455
Northwestern	5	–	13	.278	6	–	16	.273
Michigan	3	–	15	.167	6	–	16	.273
Purdue	3	–	15	.167	4	–	18	.182
Rankings from AP Poll

1952–53 Border Conference men's basketball standings
	Conf.				Overall
Team	W		L	PCT	W		L	PCT
Hardin–Simmons	11	–	3	.786	19	–	12	.613
Arizona	11	–	3	.786	13	–	11	.542
Arizona State–Tempe	10	–	4	.714	13	–	12	.520
Texas Tech	9	–	5	.643	12	–	10	.545
West Texas State	5	–	9	.357	8	–	13	.381
New Mexico A&M	5	–	9	.357	7	–	17	.292
Texas Western	3	–	11	.214	4	–	21	.160
Arizona State–Flagstaff	2	–	12	.143	4	–	19	.174
† Regular-season co-championship winner Rankings from AP Poll

1952–53 California Basketball Association men's basketball standings
	Conf.				Overall
Team	W		L	PCT	W		L	PCT
No. 16 Santa Clara†	6	–	2	.750	17	–	7	.708
San Francisco	6	–	2	.750	10	–	11	.476
San Jose State	4	–	4	.500	15	–	8	.652
Saint Mary's	4	–	4	.500	9	–	11	.450
Pacific		–		–	2	–	18	.100
† Regular-season championship winner Rankings from AP Poll

1952–53 Eastern Intercollegiate Basketball League standings
	Conf.				Overall
Team	W		L	PCT	W		L	PCT
Pennsylvania	10	–	2	.833	22	–	5	.815
Columbia	8	–	4	.667	17	–	6	.739
Cornell	6	–	6	.500	9	–	12	.429
Yale	6	–	6	.500	10	–	15	.400
Dartmouth	5	–	7	.417	12	–	14	.462
Princeton	5	–	7	.417	9	–	14	.391
Harvard	2	–	10	.167	7	–	16	.304
Rankings from AP Poll

1952–53 Metropolitan New York Conference men's basketball standings
	Conf.				Overall
Team	W		L	PCT	W		L	PCT
Manhattan	6	–	0	1.000	20	–	6	.769
No. 7 St. John's	5	–	1	.833	17	–	6	.739
Fordham	4	–	2	.667	18	–	8	.692
St. Francis (NY)	2	–	3	.400	19	–	7	.731
NYU	1	–	3	.250	9	–	11	.450
CCNY	1	–	5	.167	10	–	6	.625
Brooklyn	0	–	5	.000	6	–	11	.353
Rankings from AP Poll

1952–53 Mid-American Conference men's basketball standings
	Conf.				Overall
Team	W		L	PCT	W		L	PCT
Miami (Ohio)	10	–	2	.833	17	–	6	.739
Toledo	9	–	3	.750	16	–	7	.696
Cincinnati	9	–	3	.750	11	–	13	.458
Western Michigan	6	–	6	.500	12	–	9	.571
Ohio	4	–	8	.333	9	–	13	.409
Kent State	3	–	9	.250	7	–	15	.318
Western Reserve	1	–	11	.083	5	–	17	.227
Rankings from AP Poll

1952–53 Missouri Valley Conference men's basketball standings
	Conf.				Overall
Team	W		L	PCT	W		L	PCT
No. 8 Oklahoma A&M	8	–	2	.800	23	–	7	.767
Tulsa	5	–	5	.500	15	–	10	.600
Saint Louis	5	–	5	.500	16	–	11	.593
Houston	5	–	5	.500	9	–	13	.409
Detroit	4	–	6	.400	12	–	14	.462
Wichita Municipal	3	–	7	.300	16	–	11	.593
Rankings from AP Poll

1952–53 Mountain States Conference men's basketball standings
	Conf.				Overall
Team	W		L	PCT	W		L	PCT
Wyoming	12	–	2	.857	20	–	10	.667
BYU	11	–	3	.786	22	–	8	.733
Utah State	7	–	7	.500	17	–	13	.567
Montana	6	–	8	.429	14	–	11	.560
Colorado A&M	5	–	9	.357	12	–	14	.462
New Mexico	5	–	9	.357	10	–	14	.417
Utah	5	–	9	.357	10	–	14	.417
Denver	5	–	9	.357	9	–	16	.360
Rankings from AP Poll

1952–53 Ohio Valley Conference men's basketball standings
	Conf.				Overall
Team	W		L	PCT	W		L	PCT
Eastern Kentucky State	9	–	1	.900	16	–	9	.640
No. 17 Western Kentucky State†	8	–	2	.800	25	–	6	.806
Murray State		–		–	18	–	9	.667
Tennessee Tech		–		–	14	–	11	.560
Morehead State		–		–	13	–	12	.520
Middle Tennessee		–		–	7	–	16	.304
† Ohio Valley Conference Tournament winner Rankings from AP Poll

1952–53 Pacific Coast Conference men's basketball standings
	Conf.				Overall
Team	W		L	PCT	W		L	PCT
North
No. 4 Washington †	15	–	1	.938	30	–	3	.909
Idaho	8	–	8	.500	15	–	12	.556
Oregon	8	–	8	.500	14	–	14	.500
Oregon State	6	–	10	.375	11	–	18	.379
Washington State	3	–	13	.188	7	–	27	.206
South
California	9	–	3	.750	16	–	10	.615
USC	7	–	5	.583	17	–	5	.773
UCLA	6	–	0	1.000	16	–	8	.667
Stanford	2	–	10	.167	7	–	20	.259
† Conference playoff series winner Rankings from AP Poll

1952–53 Rocky Mountain Conference men's basketball standings
	Conf.				Overall
Team	W		L	PCT	W		L	PCT
Idaho State	10	–	0	1.000	16	–	6	.727
Colorado State–Greeley	7	–	3	.700	14	–	11	.560
Montana State	6	–	4	.600	11	–	24	.314
Western State (CO)	4	–	6	.400	9	–	14	.391
Colorado College	2	–	8	.200	3	–	18	.143
Colorado Mines	1	–	9	.100	2	–	18	.100

1952–53 Southeastern Conference men's basketball standings
	Conf.				Overall
Team	W		L	PCT	W		L	PCT
No. 5 LSU	13	–	0	1.000	22	–	3	.880
Tulane	9	–	4	.692	12	–	6	.667
Florida	8	–	5	.615	13	–	6	.684
Tennessee	7	–	6	.538	13	–	8	.619
Auburn	6	–	7	.462	13	–	8	.619
Alabama	6	–	7	.462	12	–	9	.571
Ole Miss	5	–	8	.385	14	–	11	.560
Vanderbilt	5	–	8	.385	10	–	9	.526
Mississippi State	5	–	8	.385	9	–	10	.474
Georgia Tech	4	–	9	.308	5	–	17	.227
Georgia	3	–	10	.231	7	–	18	.280
Rankings from AP Poll

1952–53 Southern Conference men's basketball standings
	Conf.				Overall
Team	W		L	PCT	W		L	PCT
No. 18 North Carolina State	13	–	3	.813	26	–	6	.813
No. 15 Wake Forest †	12	–	3	.800	19	–	6	.760
Maryland	12	–	3	.800	15	–	8	.652
West Virginia	11	–	3	.786	19	–	17	.528
Furman	10	–	3	.769	21	–	6	.778
Duke	12	–	4	.750	17	–	8	.680
Richmond	13	–	5	.722	21	–	7	.750
North Carolina	15	–	6	.714	17	–	10	.630
George Washington	12	–	6	.667	15	–	7	.682
Clemson	6	–	8	.429	8	–	10	.444
South Carolina	7	–	12	.368	11	–	13	.458
William & Mary	6	–	13	.316	10	–	13	.435
Virginia Tech	4	–	13	.235	4	–	19	.174
Davidson	3	–	14	.176	4	–	16	.200
VMI	1	–	14	.067	5	–	19	.208
Washington and Lee	1	–	17	.056	2	–	20	.091
The Citadel	0	–	11	.000	4	–	14	.222
† Southern Conference Tournament winner Rankings from AP Poll

1952–53 Southwest Conference men's basketball standings
	Conf.				Overall
Team	W		L	PCT	W		L	PCT
TCU	9	–	3	.750	16	–	8	.667
Rice	8	–	4	.667	15	–	6	.714
Texas	8	–	4	.667	12	–	9	.571
Baylor	6	–	6	.500	10	–	11	.476
Arkansas	4	–	8	.333	10	–	11	.476
SMU	4	–	8	.333	8	–	12	.400
Texas A&M	3	–	9	.250	6	–	15	.286
Rankings from AP Poll

1952–53 Western New York Little Three Conference men's basketball standings
	Conf.				Overall
Team	W		L	PCT	W		L	PCT
Niagara	4	–	0	1.000	22	–	6	.786
St. Bonaventure	1	–	3	.250	10	–	11	.476
Canisius	1	–	3	.250	9	–	14	.391
Rankings from AP Poll

1952–53 Yankee Conference men's basketball standings
	Conf.				Overall
Team	W		L	PCT	W		L	PCT
Connecticut	5	–	1	.833	17	–	4	.810
Rhode Island	6	–	2	.750	13	–	10	.565
Maine	3	–	4	.429	7	–	10	.412
Vermont	1	–	2	.333	11	–	10	.524
New Hampshire	2	–	5	.286	8	–	10	.444
Massachusetts	1	–	4	.200	4	–	15	.211

=== Major independents ===
A total of 44 college teams played as major independents. Among them, Seton Hall (31–2) finished with both the best winning percentage (.939) and the most wins.

Although not considered a major independent during the season, Southwest Missouri State (24–4) played as an independent and was ranked No. 20 in the season's final AP Poll.

1952–53 NCAA men's basketball independents standings
	Conf.				Overall
Team	W		L	PCT	W		L	PCT
No. 2 Seton Hall		–		–	31	–	2	.939
No. 14 Seattle		–		–	29	–	3	.906
No. 6 La Salle		–		–	25	–	3	.893
No. 10 Notre Dame		–		–	19	–	5	.792
Louisville		–		–	22	–	6	.786
No. 13 Holy Cross		–		–	20	–	6	.769
Navy		–		–	16	–	5	.762
Oklahoma City		–		–	18	–	6	.750
No. 9 Duquesne		–		–	21	–	8	.724
Villanova		–		–	19	–	8	.704
No. 19 DePaul		–		–	19	–	9	.679
Georgetown		–		–	13	–	7	.650
Penn State		–		–	15	–	9	.625
Temple		–		–	16	–	10	.615
Butler		–		–	14	–	9	.609
Lehigh		–		–	12	–	8	.600
Baldwin Wallace		–		–	13	–	9	.591
Army		–		–	11	–	8	.579
Colgate		–		–	12	–	9	.571
Muhlenberg		–		–	13	–	10	.565
St. Joseph's		–		–	14	–	11	.560
Bradley		–		–	15	–	12	.556
Dayton		–		–	16	–	13	.552
Marquette		–		–	13	–	11	.542
Pittsburgh		–		–	12	–	11	.522
Drake		–		–	13	–	12	.520
Lafayette		–		–	13	–	12	.520
Loyola (La.)		–		–	14	–	13	.519
Gonzaga		–		–	15	–	14	.517
Loyola (Calif.)		–		–	14	–	14	.500
John Carroll		–		–	13	–	14	.481
Xavier		–		–	11	–	12	.478
Siena		–		–	10	–	11	.476
Bowling Green State		–		–	12	–	15	.444
Creighton		–		–	11	–	14	.440
Virginia		–		–	10	–	13	.435
Miami (Fla.)		–		–	9	–	12	.429
Syracuse		–		–	7	–	11	.389
Rutgers		–		–	8	–	13	.381
Valparaiso		–		–	9	–	15	.375
Loyola (Ill.)		–		–	8	–	15	.348
Boston College		–		–	7	–	15	.318
Brown		–		–	5	–	14	.263
Bucknell		–		–	3	–	16	.158
Rankings from AP Poll

== Post-season tournaments ==
=== NCAA tournament ===
==== Final Four ====
National semifinals
LSU	67
Indiana	80
Kansas	79
Washington	53

National finals
Indiana	69
Kansas	68
Third place
LSU	69
Washington	88

=== National Invitation tournament ===
==== Semifinals & finals ====
Semifinals
St. John's	64
Duquesne	55
Manhattan	56
Seton Hall	74

Finals
St. John's	46
Seton Hall	58
Third place
Duquesne	81
Manhattan	67

== Awards ==
=== Consensus All-American teams ===
Consensus First Team
Player	Position	Class	Team
Ernie Beck	F	Senior	Pennsylvania
Walter Dukes	C	Senior	Seton Hall
Tom Gola	F	Sophomore	La Salle
Bob Houbregs	F	Senior	Washington
Johnny O'Brien	G	Senior	Seattle

Consensus Second Team
Player	Position	Class	Team
Dick Knostman	F	Senior	Kansas State
Bob Pettit	C	Junior	Louisiana State
Joe Richey	G	Senior	Brigham Young
Don Schlundt	C	Sophomore	Indiana
Frank Selvy	G	Junior	Furman

=== Major player of the year awards ===
- Helms Player of the Year: Bob Houbregs, Washington

=== Other major awards ===
- NIT/Haggerty Award (Top player in New York City metro area): Walter Dukes, Seton Hall

== Coaching changes ==
A number of teams changed coaches during the season and after it ended.

Team	Former Coach	Interim Coach	New Coach	Reason
Army	Elmer Ripley		Bob Vanatta	
Boston College	Al McClellan		Dino Martin	
Canisius	Joseph Niland		Joseph Curran	
Kansas State	Jack Gardner		Tex Winter	Gardner left to coach Utah.
Loyola (Calif.)	Edwin Powell		Bill Donovan	
Marquette	Tex Winter		Jack Nagle	Winter left to coach Kansas State.
Morehead State	Ellis T. Johnson		Bobby Laughlin	
New Mexico M&M	George McCarty		Presley Askew	
Pittsburgh	Doc Carlson		Bob Timmons	
St. Joseph's	Bill Ferguson		John McMenamin	
St. Bonaventure	Ed Melvin		Eddie Donovan	
Utah	Vadal Peterson		Jack Gardner	
