= List of UCLA Bruins in the NBA =

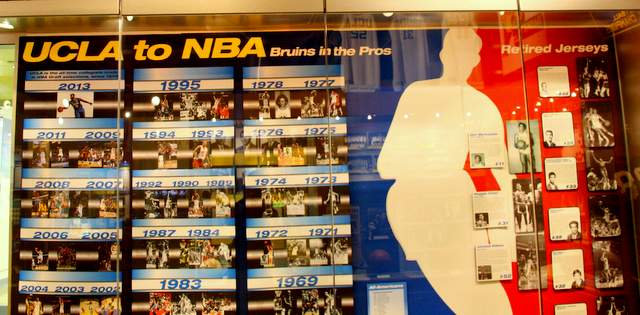
Exhibit at UCLA Athletics Hall of Fame on UCLA players in the NBA

The men's college basketball program of the University of California, Los Angeles (UCLA) was founded in 1920 and is known competitively as the UCLA Bruins. The Bruins have won 11 NCAA Division I championships, including 10 under coach John Wooden, which gives them the most of any school. Many former players advanced to play professionally in the National Basketball Association (NBA). During the 2010–2011 NBA season, UCLA had 14 active players in the NBA, more than any other program. As of the 2026–27 season, 107 former UCLA players have played in the NBA. (Note: Includes players in the American Basketball Association (ABA), which merged with the NBA in 1976.)

== NBA players ==
Following are former Bruins who have played at least one game in the NBA.

Player	Former UCLA player who played in the NBA
UCLA	Years played at UCLA
NBA	Years played in the NBA (Note: Includes statistics from American Basketball Association (ABA), which merged with the NBA in 1976.)
Year	Year selected in the NBA draft. U if the player was undrafted
Rnd	Round selected in the draft. Territorial picks noted by "T"
Pick	Overall position selected in the draft
Min	Minutes per game average in NBA career
Pts	Points per game average in NBA career
Reb	Rebounds per game average in NBA career
Ast	Assists per game average in NBA career
ASG	The number of times the player had been selected to play in the NBA All-Star Game (Note: Includes All-Star games in the American Basketball Association (ABA), which merged with the NBA in 1976.) as of 2026
^	Denotes player who was still active in the NBA during the 2026–27 season
*	Elected to the Naismith Memorial Basketball Hall of Fame as a player
**	Elected to the Naismith Memorial Basketball Hall of Fame as a contributor
†	Transferred from UCLA to another school

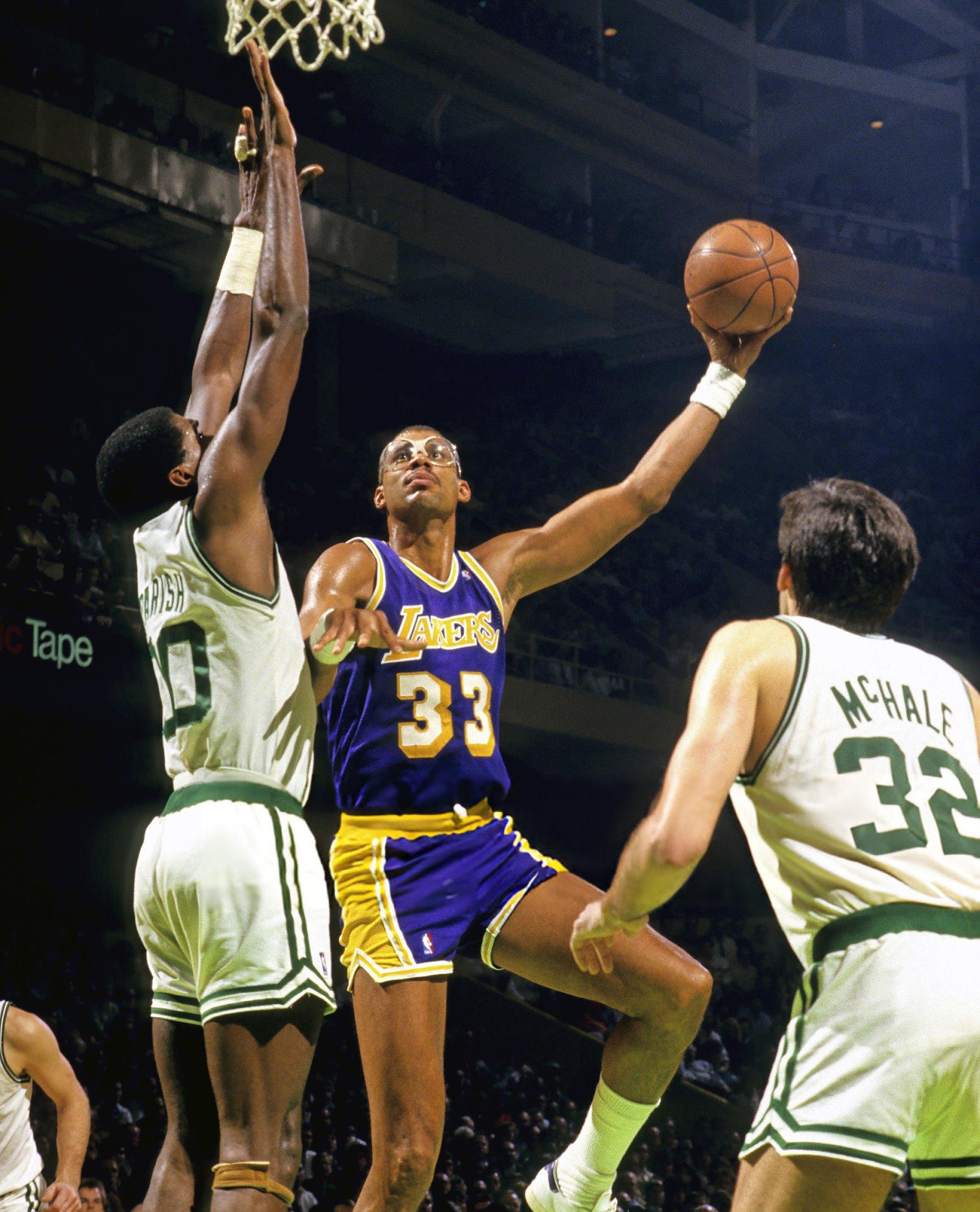
Kareem Abdul-Jabbar (formerly Lew Alcindor) with the Los Angeles Lakers in the late 1980s

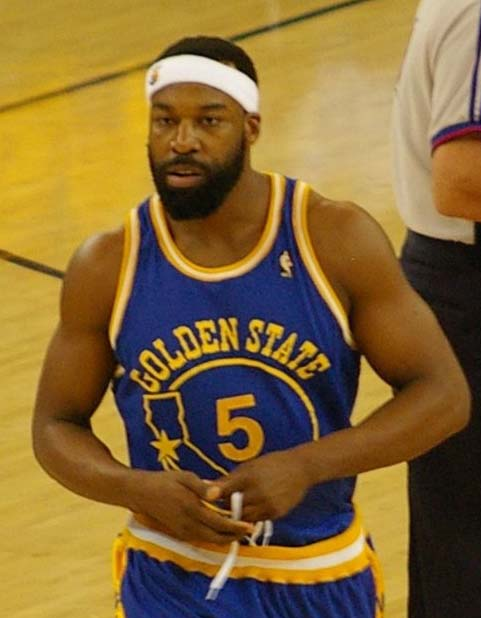
Baron Davis with the Golden State Warriors in 2008

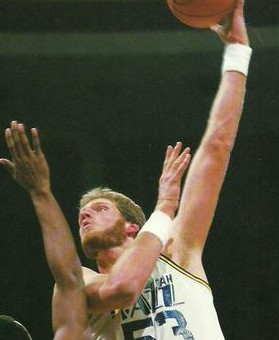
Mark Eaton with the Utah Jazz c. 1988

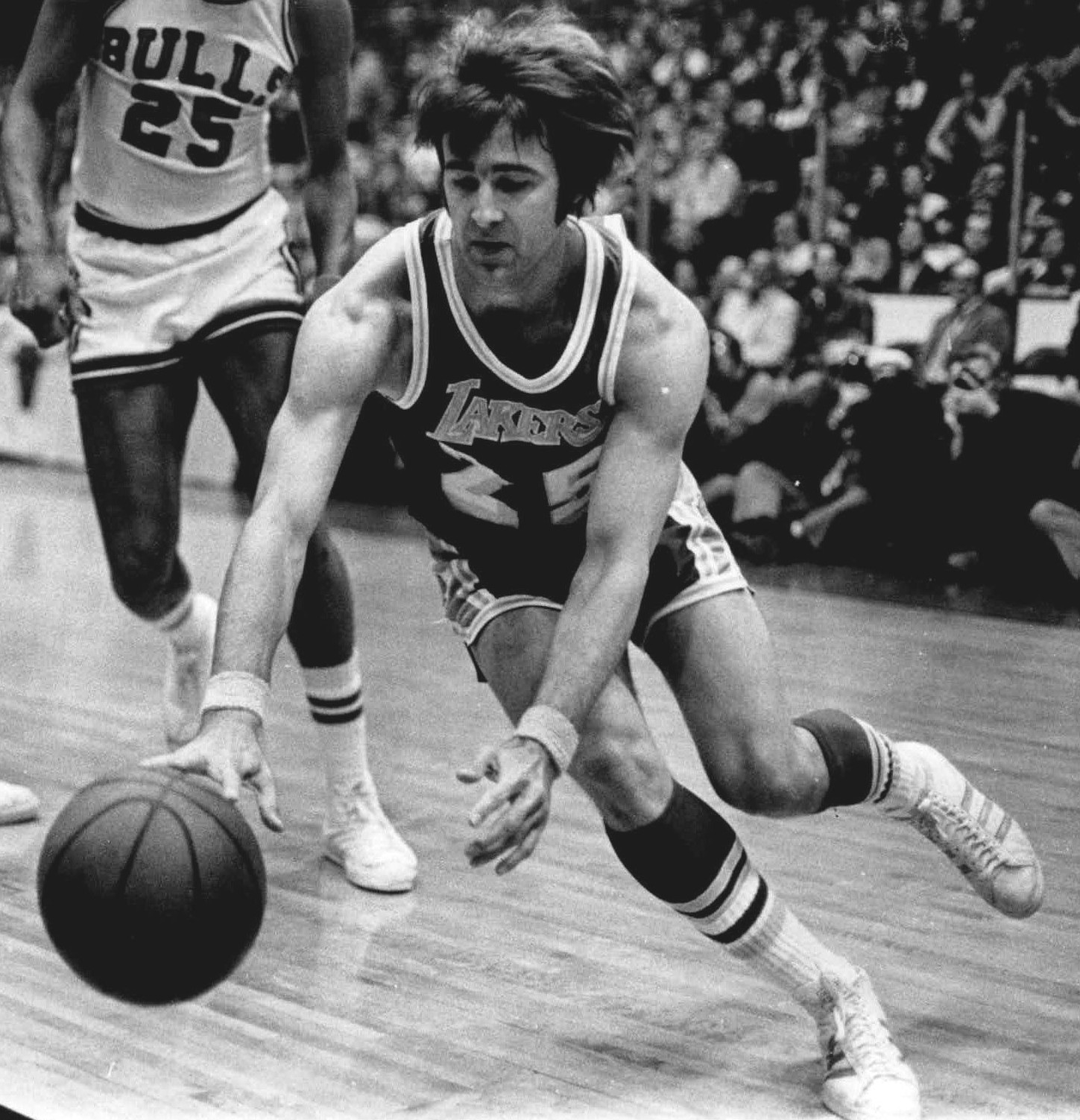
Gail Goodrich with the Los Angeles Lakers in 1973

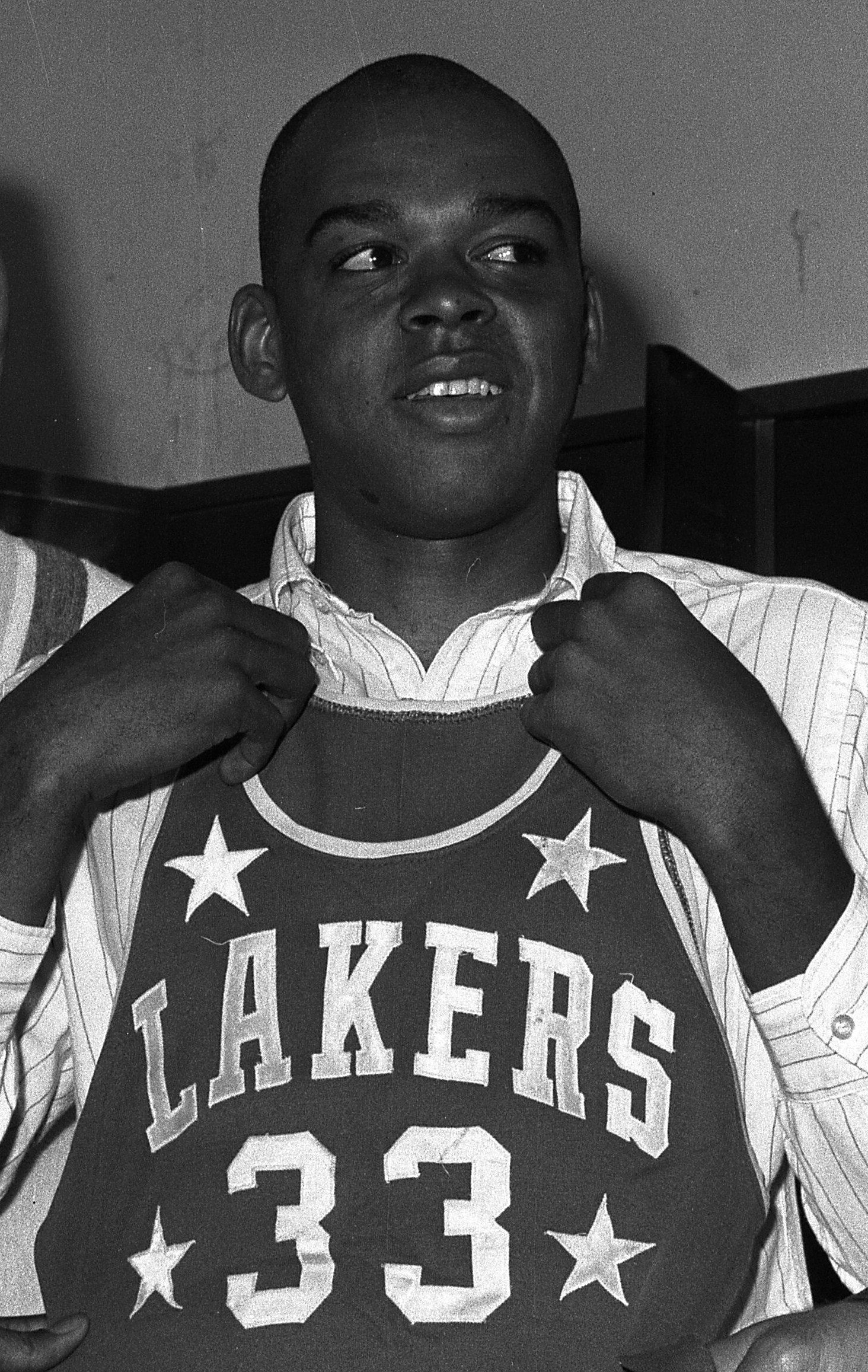
Walt Hazzard with the Los Angeles Lakers in 1964

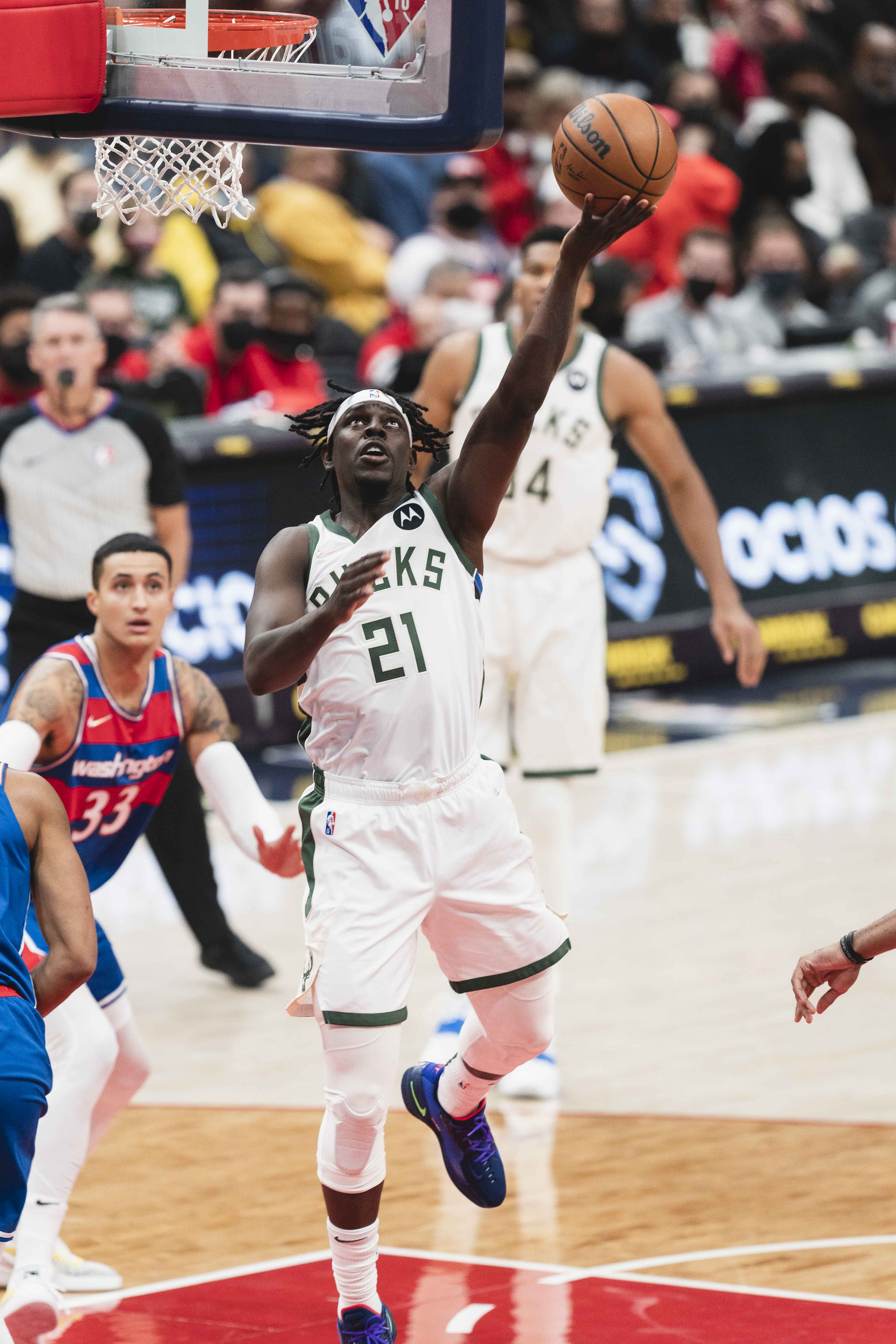
Jrue Holiday with the Milwaukee Bucks in 2021

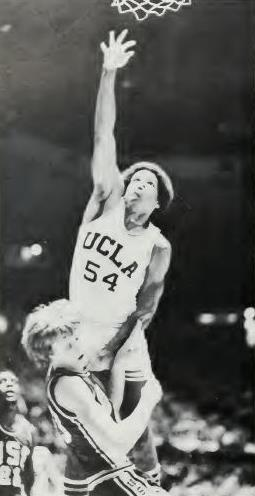
Marques Johnson with the Bruins in 1977.

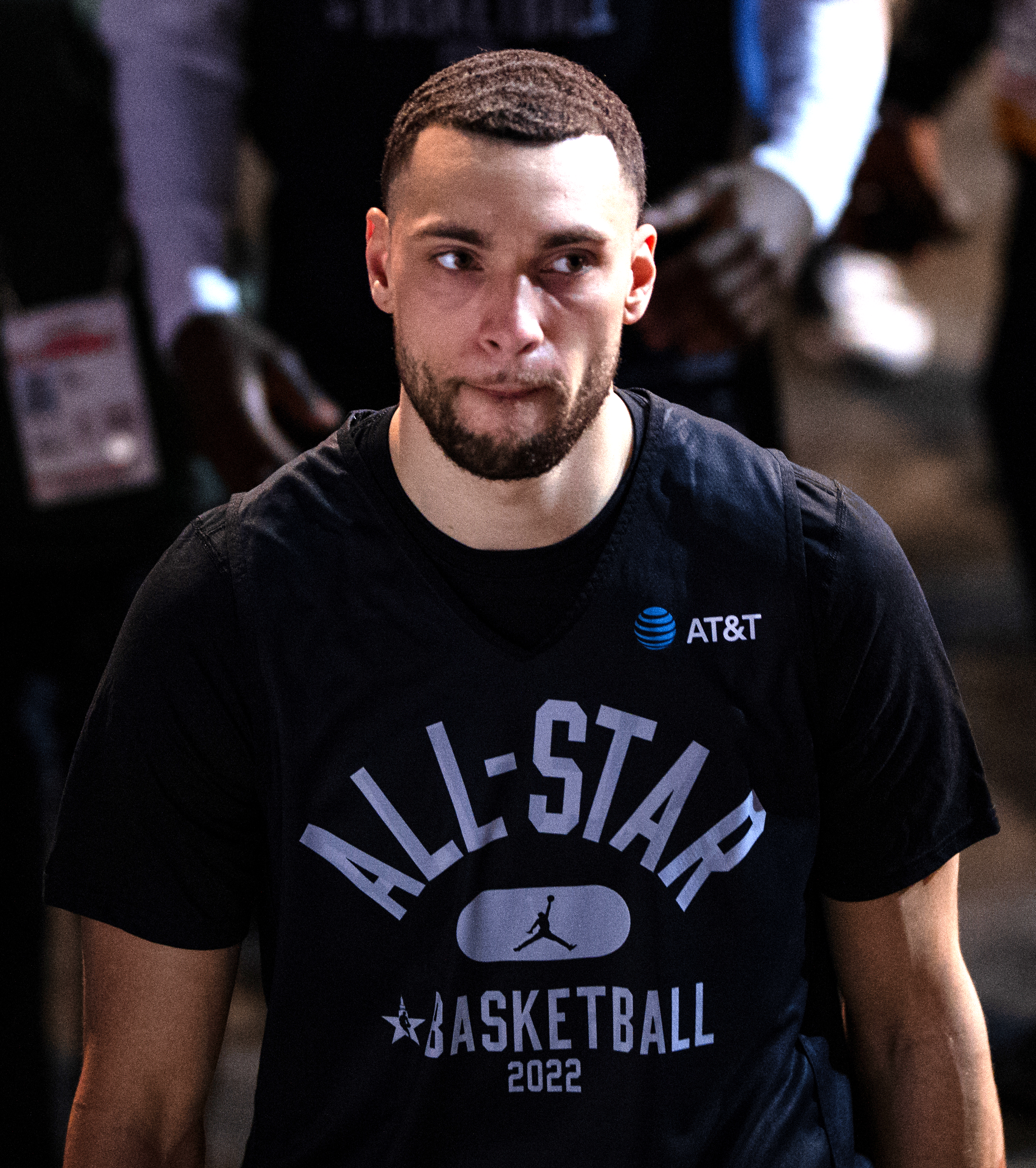
Zach LaVine at 2022 NBA All-Star Game

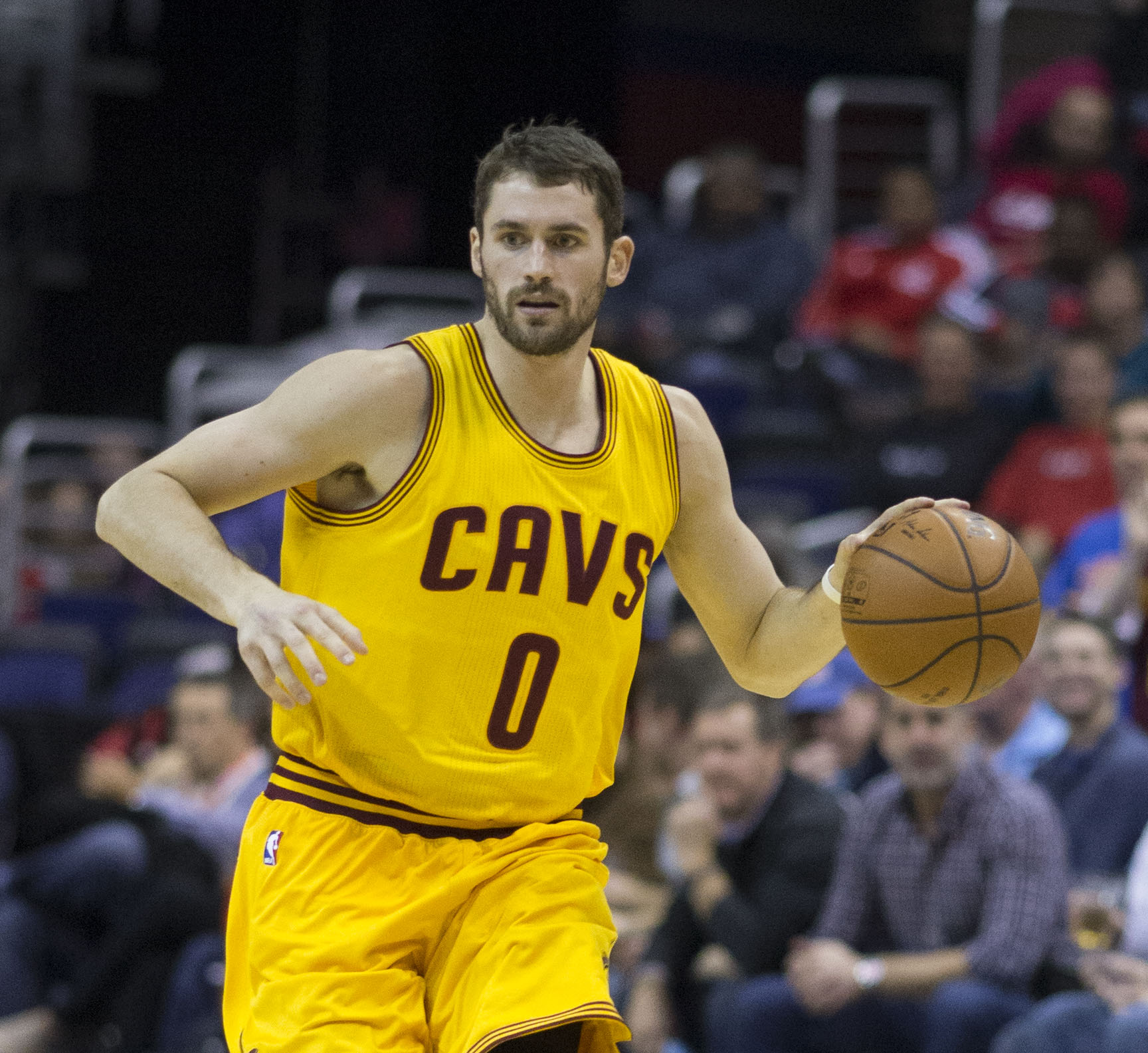
Kevin Love with the Cleveland Cavaliers in 2014

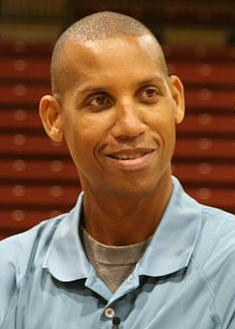
Reggie Miller in 2010

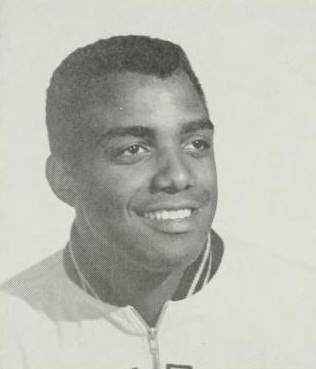
Willie Naulls in 1956

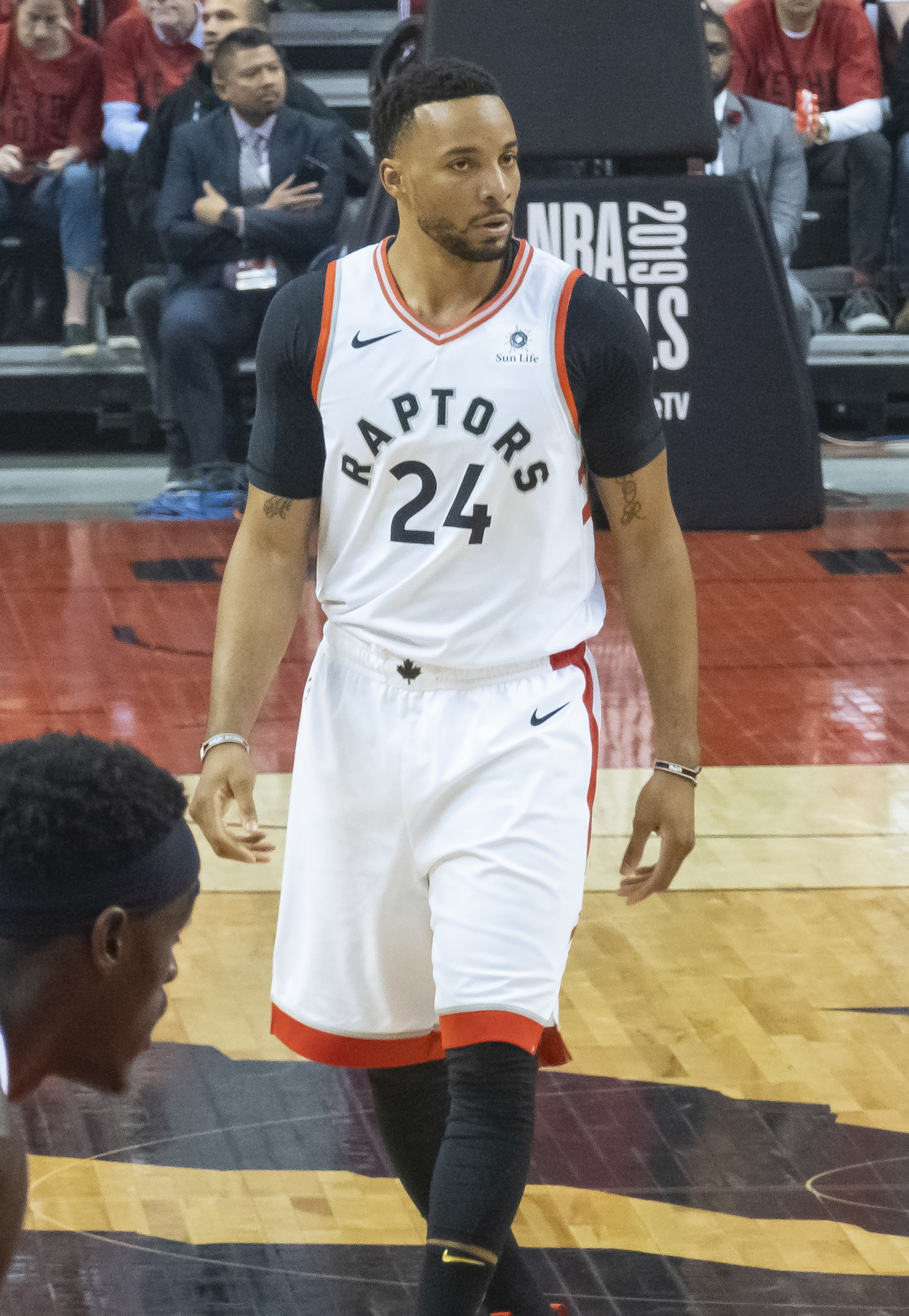
Norman Powell with the Toronto Raptors in 2019

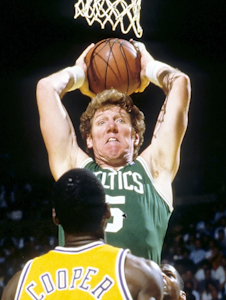
Bill Walton of the Boston Celtics in 1987

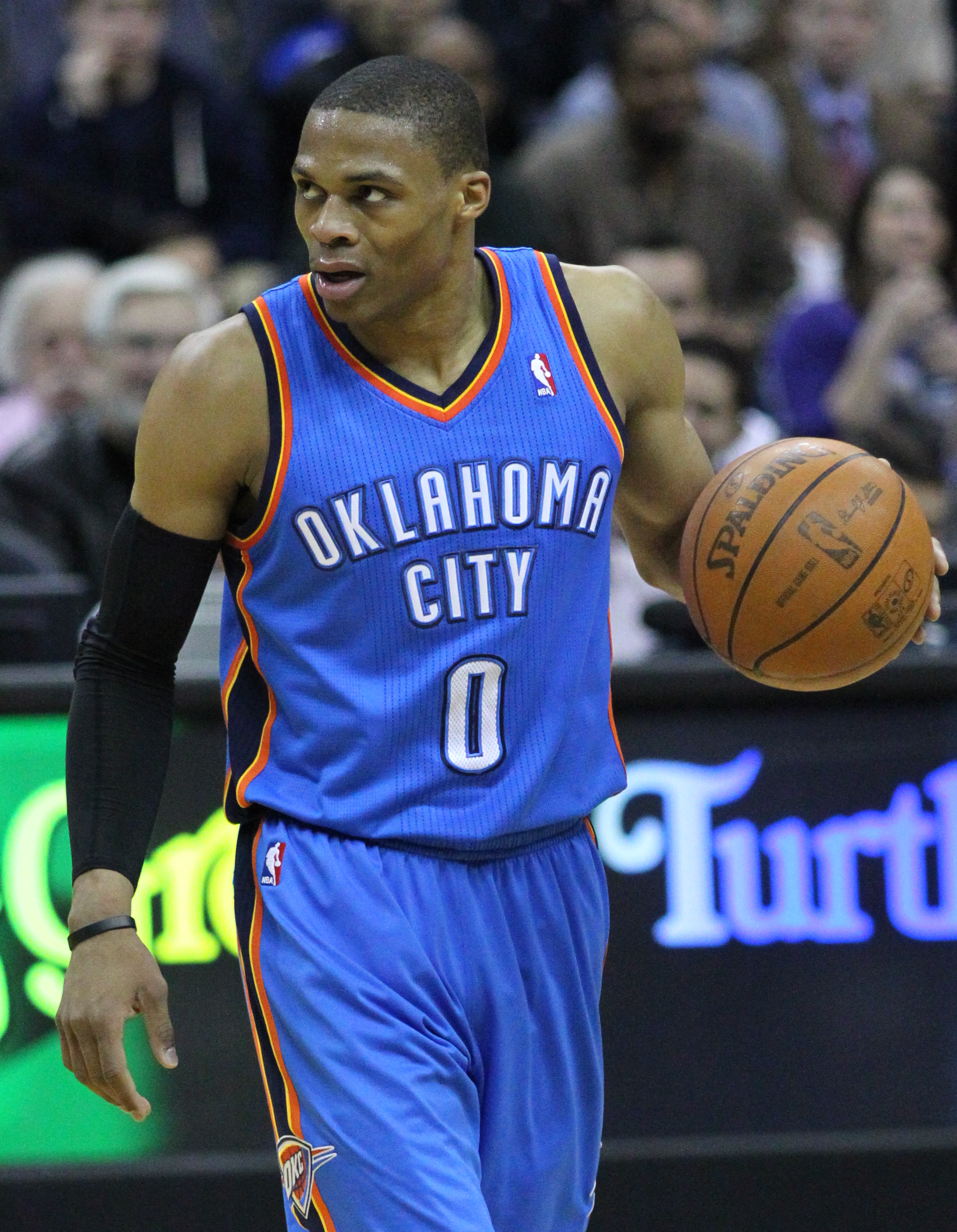
Russell Westbrook of the Oklahoma City Thunder in 2011

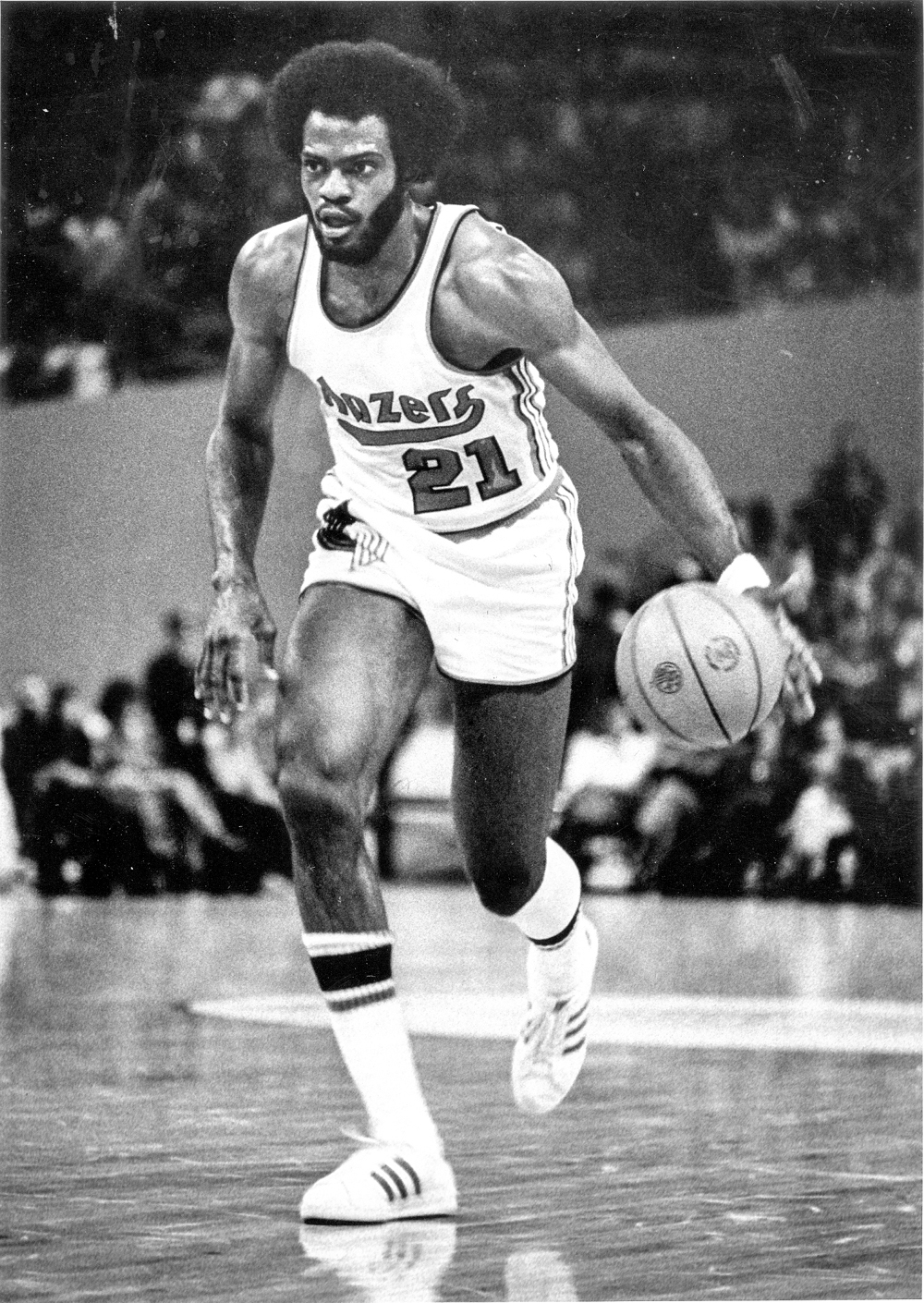
Sidney Wicks with Portland Trail Blazers in 1972

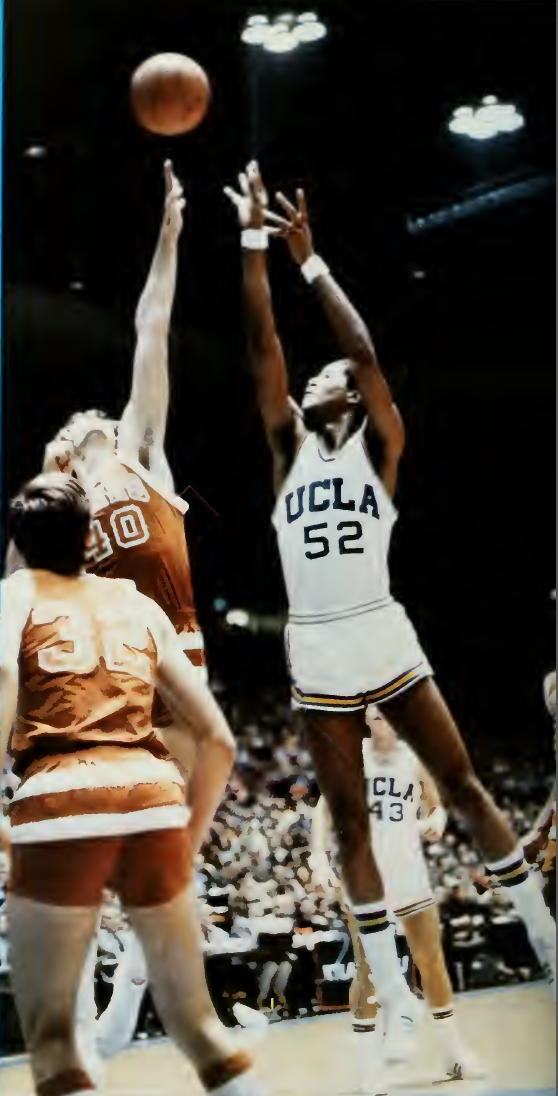
Jamaal Wilkes with UCLA in 1971–72

Statistics updated through end of 2025–26 NBA season

Player	Career		NBA draft			NBA statistics					Ref
Player	UCLA	NBA	Year	Rnd	Pick	Min	Pts	Reb	Ast	ASG	Ref
Kareem Abdul-Jabbar* (formerly Lew Alcindor) (Note: Lew Alcindor changed his name to Kareem Abdul-Jabbar in 1971.)	1966–1969	1969–1989	1969	1	1	36.8	24.6	11.2	3.6	19	
Jordan Adams	2012–2014	2014–2016	2014	1	22	8.2	3.2	0.9	0.6	0	
Arron Afflalo	2004–2007	2007–2018	2007	1	27	27.3	10.8	2.9	1.8	0	
Lucius Allen	1966–1968	1969–1979	1969	1	3	28.7	13.4	3.1	4.5	0	
Darrell Allums	1976–1980	1980–1981	1980	5	103	12.5	2.7	3.0	1.1	0	
Kyle Anderson^	2012–2014	2014–present	2014	1	30	21.4	6.8	4.2	2.8	0	
Ike Anigbogu	2016–2017	2017–2019	2017	2	47	2.6	0.9	0.9	0.1	0	
Trevor Ariza	2003–2004	2004–2022	2004	2	43	29.5	10.4	4.8	2.1	0	
Amari Bailey	2022–2023	2023–2024	2023	2	41	6.5	2.3	0.9	0.7	0	
Toby Bailey	1994–1998	1998–2000	1998	2	45	9.6	3.3.	1.7	0.6	0	
Lonzo Ball	2016–2017	2017–2026	2017	1	2	30.1	10.6	5.3	5.6	0	
Don Barksdale**	1946–1947	1951–1955	U	—N/a	—N/a	28.5	11.0	8.0	2.1	1	
Matt Barnes	1998–2002	2003–2017	2002	2	45	23.6	8.2	4.6	1.8	0	
Jules Bernard	2018–2022	2023–2024	U	—N/a	—N/a	7.8	3.9	1.4	0.8	0	
Henry Bibby	1969–1972	1972–1981	1972	4	58	22.9	8.6	2.3	3.3	0	
Jonah Bolden	2015–2016	2018–2020	2017	2	36	13.5	4.3	3.4	0.8	0	
Adem Bona^	2022–2024	2024–present	2024	2	41	16.6	5.3	4.3	0.5	0	
Cedric Bozeman	2001–2006	2006–2007	U	—N/a	—N/a	8.7	1.1	1.0	0.4	0	
Moses Brown	2018–2019	2019–2025	U	—N/a	—N/a	11.7	5.3	4.9	0.2	0	
Mitchell Butler	1989–1993	1993–2004	U	—N/a	—N/a	15.1	5.2	2.0	0.9	0	
Jaylen Clark^	2020–2023	2023–present	2023	2	53	13.1	4.1	1.6	0.6	0	
Darren Collison	2005–2009	2009–2022	2009	1	21	29.3	12.5	2.7	5.0	0	
Baron Davis	1996–1999	1999–2012	1999	1	3	34.2	16.1	3.8	7.2	2	
Darren Daye	1979–1983	1983–1988	1983	3	57	15.9	6.8	2.6	2.0	0	
Larry Drew II	2010–2013	2015–2018	U	—N/a	—N/a	13.1	2.9	0.8	2.5	0	
Ralph Drollinger	1972–1976	1980–1981	1978	5	105	11.2	2.5	3.2	2.3	0	
Mark Eaton	1980–1982	1982–1993	1982	4	72	28.8	6.0	7.9	1.0	1	
Tyus Edney	1991–1995	1995–2001	1995	2	47	21.0	7.6	1.7	4.0	0	
Keith Erickson	1962–1965	1965–1977	1965	3	18	24.6	9.5	4.5	2.6	0	
Jordan Farmar	2004–2006	2006–2016	2006	1	26	19.5	7.7	1.9	2.9	0	
Kenny Fields	1980–1984	1984–1988	1984	1	21	14.6	6.2	2.5	1.0	0	
Greg Foster	1985–1988†	1990–2003	1990	2	35	12.2	3.9	2.6	0.5	0	
Rod Foster	1979–1983	1983–1986	1983	2	28	16.6	7.5	1.2	2.3	0	
Dan Gadzuric	1998–2002	2002–2012	2002	2	33	14.8	4.7	4.4	0.4	0	
Corey Gaines	1983–1986†	1988–1995	1988	3	65	12.5	3.1	0.9	3.1	0	
Gail Goodrich*	1962–1965	1965–1979	1965	T	—N/a	32.5	18.6	3.2	4.7	5	
Drew Gordon	2008–2010†	2014	U	—N/a	—N/a	7.9	1.9	2.0	0.2	0	
Stuart Gray	1981–1984	1984–1991	1984	2	29	9.0	2.3	2.6	0.4	0	
David Greenwood	1975–1979	1979–1991	1979	1	2	28.4	10.2	7.9	2.0	0	
Jack Haley	1984–1987	1988–1998	1987	4	79	9.6	3.5	2.7	0.2	0	
Roy Hamilton	1975–1979	1979–1981	1979	1	10	15.4	4.6	1.5	2.6	0	
Walt Hazzard	1961–1964	1964–1974	1964	T	—N/a	26.5	12.6	3.0	4.9	1	
J. R. Henderson	1994–1998	1998–1999	1998	2	56	11.0	3.2	1.6	0.7	0	
Aaron Holiday	2015–2018	2018–2026	2018	1	23	16.1	6.4	1.5	1.9	0	
Jrue Holiday^	2007–2009	2009–present	2009	1	17	32.8	15.9	4.2	6.2	2	
Brad Holland	1975–1979	1979–1982	1979	1	14	7.4	3.2	0.6	0.7	0	
Ryan Hollins	2002–2006	2006–2016	2006	2	50	11.8	3.7	2.2	0.3	0	
Michael Holton	1979–1983	1984–1990	1983	3	53	18.0	6.2	1.4	3.0	0	
Tyler Honeycutt	2009–2011	2011–2013	2011	2	35	5.0	1.2	1.0	0.4	0	
Ralph Jackson	1980–1984	1984–1985	1984	4	71	12.0	2.0	1.0	4.0	0	
Jaime Jaquez Jr.^	2019–2023	2023–present	2023	1	18	25.9	12.1	4.4	3.3	0	
Marques Johnson	1973–1977	1977–1990	1977	1	3	34.3	20.1	7.0	3.6	5	
Johnny Juzang	2020–2022	2022–2026	U	—N/a	—N/a	16.0	6.9	2.2	0.9	0	
Jason Kapono	1999–2003	2003–2012	2003	2	31	17.8	6.7	1.7	0.8	0	
Edgar Lacy	1964–1966	1968–1969	1968	4	43	13.2	5.1	3.9	0.7	0	
Zach LaVine^	2013–2014	2014–present	2014	1	13	32.7	20.7	4.0	3.9	2	
T. J. Leaf	2016–2017	2017–2021	2017	1	18	8.5	3.3	1.9	0.3	0	
Greg Lee	1971–1974	1974–1976	1974	7	115	9.8	2.4	0.5	2.4	0	
Malcolm Lee	2008–2011	2011–2014	2011	2	43	14.8	3.9	1.8	1.4	0	
Kevon Looney^	2014–2015	2015–present	2015	1	30	17.1	4.9	5.7	1.6	0	
Kevin Love	2007–2008	2008–2026	2008	1	5	28.4	15.8	9.8	2.3	5	
Mike Lynn	1964–1968	1969–1971	1968	4	39	8.7	2.6	1.4	0.6	0	
Don MacLean	1988–1992	1992–2001	1992	1	19	20.9	10.9	3.8	1.3	0	
Gerald Madkins	1987–1992	1993–1998	U	—N/a	—N/a	8.8	1.7	0.5	1.4	0	
Aday Mara^	2023–2025†	2026–present	2026	1	12	–	–	–	–	0	
Darrick Martin	1988–1992	1994–2008	U	—N/a	—N/a	17.8	6.9	1.1	2.9	0	
Luc Richard Mbah a Moute	2005–2008	2008–2020	2008	2	37	23.3	6.4	4.1	0.9	0	
Andre McCarter	1973–1976	1976–1981	1976	3	89	11.5	3.8	0.9	1.7	0	
Jelani McCoy	1995–1998	1998–2008	1998	2	33	14.7	4.6	3.5	0.5	0	
Dave Meyers	1972–1975	1975–1980	1975	1	2	26.6	11.2	6.3	2.3	0	
Reggie Miller*	1983–1987	1987–2005	1987	1	11	34.3	18.2	3.0	3.0	5	
Dave Minor	1946–1948	1951–1953	U	—N/a	—N/a	27.3	7.6	4.5	2.5	0	
Jérôme Moïso	1998–2000	2000–2005	2000	1	11	9.6	2.7	2.7	0.3	0	
Shabazz Muhammad	2012–2013	2013–2018	2013	1	14	17.2	9.0	2.8	0.5	0	
Tracy Murray	1989–1992	1992–2004	1992	1	18	18.4	9.0	2.5	0.8	0	
Swen Nater	1971–1973	1973–1984	1973	1	16	28.7	12.4	11.6	1.7	2	
Willie Naulls	1953–1956	1956–1966	1956	—N/a	—N/a	28.8	15.8	9.1	1.6	4	
Charles O'Bannon	1993–1997	1997–1999	1997	2	31	8.3	2.5	1.4	0.6	0	
Ed O'Bannon	1991–1995	1995–1997	1995	1	9	16.1	5.0	2.5	0.8	0	
Keith Owens	1987–1991	1991–1992	U	—N/a	—N/a	4.0	1.3	0.8	0.2	0	
Steve Patterson	1968–1971	1971–1976	1971	2	18	15.9	4.4	4.7	1.3	0	
Richard Petruška	1992–1993	1993–1994	1993	2	46	4.2	2.4	1.4	0.0	0	
Norman Powell^	2011–2015	2015–present	2015	2	46	24.7	14.0	2.7	1.6	1	
Jerome "Pooh" Richardson	1985–1989	1989–1999	1989	1	10	30.4	11.1	2.8	6.5	0	
Curtis Rowe	1968–1971	1971–1979	1971	1	11	31.0	11.6	7.2	1.6	1	
Mike Sanders	1978–1982	1982–1993	1982	4	74	19.1	8.0	3.0	1.4	0	
Alan Sawyer	1945–1950	1950–1951	1950	3	—N/a	—N/a	6.6	3.8	0.8	0	
Lynn Shackelford	1966–1969	1969–1970	1969	7	91	8.3	2.6	1.2	0.5	0	
Dijon Thompson	2001–2005	2005–2007	2005	2	54	5.8	2.8	1.2	0.2	0	
Raymond Townsend	1974–1978	1978–1982	1978	1	22	13.1	4.8	1.0	1.4	0	
John Vallely	1967–1970	1970–1972	1970	1	14	8.0	3.6	0.7	0.8	0	
Kiki Vandeweghe	1976–1980	1980–1993	1980	1	11	30.3	19.7	3.4	2.1	2	
Brett Vroman	1974–1977†	1980–1981	1978	4	87	8.5	3.1	2.3	0.8	0	
Bill Walton*	1971–1974	1974–1987	1974	1	1	28.3	13.3	10.5	3.4	2	
Richard Washington	1973–1976	1976–1982	1976	1	3	22.4	9.8	6.3	1.2	0	
Earl Watson	1997–2001	2001–2014	2001	2	39	22.2	6.4	2.3	4.4	0	
Peyton Watson^	2021–2022	2022–present	2022	1	30	21.9	8.7	3.5	1.3	0	
David Wear	2011–2014	2015	U	—N/a	—N/a	3.5	0.0	1.0	0.5	0	
Travis Wear	2011–2014	2014–2018	U	—N/a	—N/a	13.2	4.0	2.1	0.7	0	
Thomas Welsh	2014–2018	2018–2019	2018	2	58	3.3	1.6	0.4	0.5	0	
Russell Westbrook	2006–2008	2008–2026	2008	1	4	33.1	20.9	6.9	8.0	9	
Sidney Wicks	1968–1971	1971–1981	1971	1	2	33.9	16.8	8.7	3.2	4	
Jamaal Wilkes* (formerly Keith Wilkes) (Note: Keith Wilkes changed his name to Jamaal Abdul-Lateef in 1975, but retained his surname for the purposes of public recognition and is better known as Jamaal Wilkes.)	1971–1974	1974–1986	1974	1	11	32.9	17.7	6.2	2.5	3	
James Wilkes	1976–1980	1980–1983	1980	3	50	13.4	4.8	2.4	0.9	0	
Trevor Wilson	1986–1990	1990–1996	1990	2	36	15.6	5.7	3.4	1.0	0	
Brad Wright	1981–1985	1986–1988	1985	3	49	9.1	3.4	3.4	0.1	0	
George Zidek	1991–1995	1995–1998	1995	1	22	9.8	3.4	2.1	0.2	0	

== NBA draftees ==
The following former Bruins were selected in the NBA draft but never played a game in the league.

Player	Former UCLA player who was drafted by the NBA
UCLA career	Years played at UCLA
Year	Year selected in the NBA draft.
Rnd	Round selected in the draft.
Pick	Overall position selected in the draft
†	Transferred from UCLA to another school

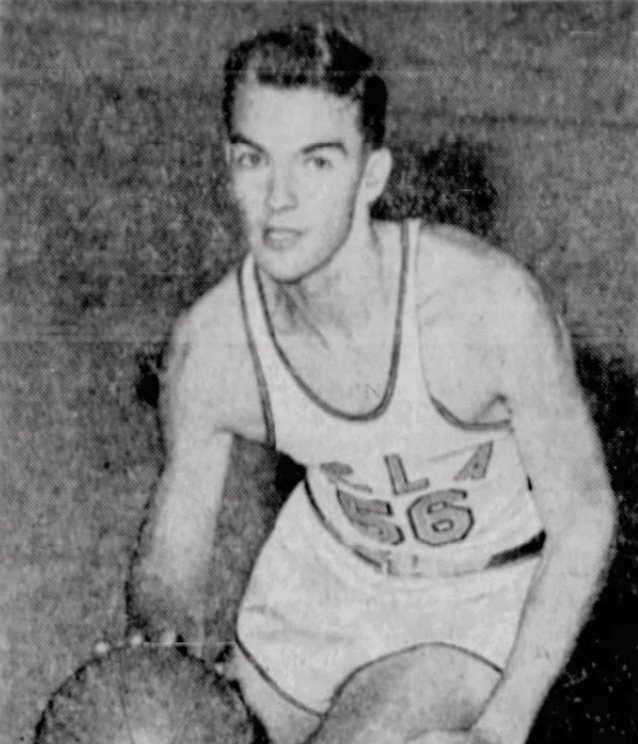
After UCLA, Don Bragg was a starter on Air Force's first AAU championship.

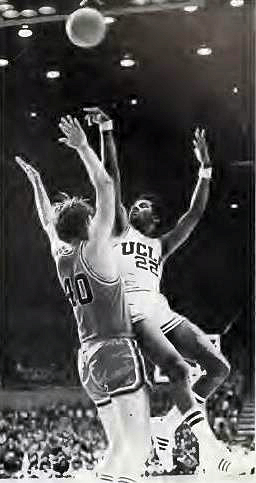
Tommy Curtis with UCLA c. 1972

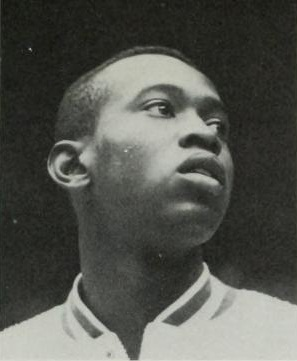
Kenny Washington with the Bruins c. 1964

Updated through the 2026 NBA draft

Player	UCLA career	NBA draft		
Player	UCLA career	Year	Rnd	Pick
Tony Anderson	1977–1982	1982	7	151
John Berberich	1959–1961	1961	5	48
Tyler Bilodeau	2024–2026	2026	2	43
Kenny Booker	1968–1971	1971	14	213
Don Bragg	1952–1955	1955	7	54
Gary Cunningham	1959–1962	1962	7	58
Tommy Curtis	1970–1974	1974	7	117
Jack Davidson	1951–1953	1954	10	86
Kenny Easley (Note: Easley played college football for UCLA (1977–1980), as well as junior-varsity basketball. He played football professionally in the National Football League.)	—N/a	1981	10	216
Bill Ellis	1959–1961	1961	8	72
Larry Farmer	1970–1973	1973	7	108
John Green	1959–1962	1962	3	24
Jaylen Hands	2017–2019	2019	2	56
Montel Hatcher	1982–1987	1987	7	149
Kenny Heitz	1966–1969	1969	5	59
Larry Hollyfield	1970–1973	1973	7	105
Carl Kraushaar	1949–1950	1950	8	94
Gary Maloncon	1981–1985	1985	7	143
Nigel Miguel	1981–1985	1985	3	62
John Moore	1951–1955	1955	7	52
Tyren Naulls	1978–1980†	1983	5	110
Cliff Pruitt	1979–1981†	1983	6	118
Dean Sears	1980–1982	1982	9	200
Gig Sims	1976–1980	1980	7	148
Vic Sison (Note: Sison never played high school or college basketball. He is a former student manager for the Bruins under coach Larry Brown. The coach left UCLA for the New Jersey Nets in 1981, and selected Sison with a final-round pick.)	—N/a	1981	10	206
George Stanich	1948–1950	1950	2	22
John Stanich	1947–1948	1948	10	—N/a
Bill Sweek	1965–1969	1969	7	86
Morris Taft	1954–1956	1956	8	58
Marvin Thomas	1974–1979	1979	10	190
Walt Torrence	1956–1959	1959	8	58
Pete Trgovich	1972–1975	1975	3	44
Michael Warren	1965–1968	1968	14	173
Kenny Washington	1964–1966	1966	8	71
