= 1952–53 Georgia Bulldogs basketball team =

American college basketball season

1952–53 Georgia Bulldogs basketball
- Conference: Southeastern Conference
- Record: 7–18 (3–10 SEC)
- Head coach: Harbin Lawson (2nd season)
- Captain: Zippy Morocco
- Home arena: Woodruff Hall

1952–53 Southeastern Conference men's basketball standings
	Conf.				Overall
Team	W		L	PCT	W		L	PCT
No. 5 LSU	13	–	0	1.000	22	–	3	.880
Tulane	9	–	4	.692	12	–	6	.667
Florida	8	–	5	.615	13	–	6	.684
Tennessee	7	–	6	.538	13	–	8	.619
Auburn	6	–	7	.462	13	–	8	.619
Alabama	6	–	7	.462	12	–	9	.571
Ole Miss	5	–	8	.385	14	–	11	.560
Vanderbilt	5	–	8	.385	10	–	9	.526
Mississippi State	5	–	8	.385	9	–	10	.474
Georgia Tech	4	–	9	.308	5	–	17	.227
Georgia	3	–	10	.231	7	–	18	.280
Rankings from AP Poll

The 1952–53 Georgia Bulldogs basketball team represented the University of Georgia as a member of the Southeastern Conference (SEC) during the 1952–53 NCAA men's basketball season. Led by second-year head coach Harbin Lawson, the Bulldogs compiled an overall record of 7–18 with a mark of 3–10 conference play, placing last out of 11 teams in the SEC. The team captain was Zippy Morocco.

== Roster ==
1952–53 Georgia Bulldogs men's basketball team
Players
Coaches

Pos.	#	Name	Height	Weight	Year	Previous school	Hometown
G		Zippy Morocco	5 ft 10 in (1.78 m)	—	Sr
C		Al Parrish	6 ft 6 in (1.98 m)	—	So
F		Lamar Potts	6 ft 4 in (1.93 m)	—	So
F		Bill Shain	6 ft 1 in (1.85 m)	—
F		Doug Foster	6 ft 1 in (1.85 m)	—	So
		Louis McGee	5 ft 10 in (1.78 m)	—
		John Carson	—	—
G		Kermith Hall	6 ft 2 in (1.88 m)	—
		Jimmy Parker	6 ft 1 in (1.85 m)	—
F		George Bell	6 ft 3 in (1.91 m)	—	Fr
		Marvin Satterfield	6 ft 2 in (1.88 m)	—
		Dan Orr	—	—
		Palmer Dearing	6 ft 2 in (1.88 m)	—
		P.B. Burdette	—	—
		Bill Strickland	—	—
		Jack Norton	6 ft 4 in (1.93 m)	—

Head coach

Harbin Lawson

Assistant coach(es)

Legend

- (C) Team captain
- (S) Suspended
- (I) Ineligible
- (W) Walk-on
- Injured
- Current redshirt

== Schedule ==
Date time, TV	Opponent	Result	Record	Site city, state
12/2/1952	Clemson	W 66-60	1–0	Athens, GA
12/6/1952	at Clemson	W 57-55	2–0	
12/9/1952	Mercer	L 63-68	2–1	Athens, GA
12/11/1952	South Carolina	W 57-50	3–1	Athens, GA
12/19/1952	Auburn	L 49-71	3–2	Athens, GA
12/23/1952	Columbia	L 51-61	3–3	Athens, GA
12/29/1952	Georgia Teachers	L 57-85	3–4	Athens, GA
12/30/1952	Georgia Tech	L 54-71	3–5	Athens, GA
1/6/1953	Georgia Tech	W 70-57	4–5	Athens, GA
1/9/1953	Auburn	L 59-64	4–6	Athens, GA
1/10/1953	Alabama	L 75-85	4–7	Athens, GA
1/13/1953	at Furman	L 74-96	4–8	
1/17/1953	at Vanderbilt	L 66-97	4–9	
1/19/1953	LSU ......................-/14	L 50-55	4–10	Athens, GA
1/21/1953	at Auburn	L 69-78	4–11	
1/26/1953	Tulane	L 64-66	4–12	Athens, GA
2/2/1953	Mississippi	L 75-77	4–13	Athens, GA
2/4/1953	at Georgia Tech	L 73-78	4–14	
2/7/1953	at Alabama	L 63-67	4–15	
2/10/1953	at South Carolina	L 64-72	4–16	
2/16/1953	Florida	W 61-58	5–16	Athens, GA
2/19/1953	at Mercer	L 62-74	5–17	
2/21/1953	Miss. State	W 75-63	6–17	Athens, GA
2/25/1953	at Tennessee	W 87-86	7–17	
3/2/1953	at Florida	L 73-79	7–18	
*Non-conference game. (#) Tournament seedings in parentheses.
