= 1952–53 LSU Tigers basketball team =

American college basketball season

1952–53 LSU Tigers basketball

SEC Regular Season Champions

NCAA tournament, Final Four
- Conference: Southeastern Conference

Ranking
- Coaches: No. 6
- AP: No. 5
- Record: 22–3 (13–0 SEC)
- Head coach: Harry Rabenhorst
- Home arena: Huey P. Long Field House

The 1952–53 LSU Tigers basketball team represented Louisiana State University as a member of the Southeastern Conference during the 1952–53 NCAA men's basketball season. The head coach was Harry Rabenhorst, and the team played their home games at Huey P. Long Field House in Baton Rouge, Louisiana.

The Tigers swept through the SEC regular season and followed that success by reaching the first Final Four appearance in school history. The team finished with a record of 22–3 (13–0 SEC).

== Roster ==
1952–53 LSU Tigers men's basketball team
Players	Coaches
Pos. / # / Name / Height / Weight / Year / Hometown; F/C / 50 / Bob Pettit / 6 ft 9 in (2.06 m) / 200 lb (91 kg) / Jr / Baton Rouge, Louisiana	Head coach: Harry Rabenhorst; Assistant coach(es) Legend: (C) Team captain; (S) Suspended; (I) Ineligible; (W) Walk-on; Injured; Current redshirt; Roster

== Schedule and results ==
Date time, TV	Rank^{#}	Opponent^{#}	Result	Record	Site city, state
Regular Season
Dec 5, 1952*		Birmingham–Southern	W 98–38	1–0	Huey Long Field House; Baton Rouge, Louisiana
Dec 8, 1952*		Southwestern (TN)	W 124–33	2–0	Huey Long Field House; Baton Rouge, Louisiana
Dec 11, 1952*		Miami (FL)	W 86–58	3–0	Huey Long Field House; Baton Rouge, Louisiana
Dec 17, 1952		at Alabama	W 58–45	4–0 (1–0)	Foster Auditorium; Tuscaloosa, Alabama
Dec 22, 1952*		at No. 14 Tulsa	L 58–84	4–1	Expo Square Pavilion; Tulsa, Oklahoma
Dec 29, 1952*		vs. Villanova; Sugar Bowl Classic	W 100–94	5–1	New Orleans, Louisiana
Dec 30, 1952*		vs. Saint Louis; Sugar Bowl Classic	W 70–67	6–1	New Orleans, Louisiana
Jan 5, 1953*		Vanderbilt	W 74–61	7–1 (2–0)	Huey Long Field House; Baton Rouge, Louisiana
Jan 10, 1953		at Mississippi State	W 75–55	8–1 (3–0)	McCarthy Gymnasium; Starkville, Mississippi
Jan 12, 1953		at Ole Miss	W 67–66	9–1 (4–0)	Gymnasium; Oxford, Mississippi
Jan 16, 1953*		at Loyola (LA)	W 58–52	10–1	The Field House; New Orleans, Louisiana
Jan 19, 1953		at Georgia	W 55–50	11–1 (5–0)	Woodruff Hall; Athens, Georgia
Jan 26, 1953*		No. 20 Tulsa	W 55–51	12–1	Huey Long Field House; Baton Rouge, Louisiana
Jan 31, 1953		Tennessee	W 95–59	13–1 (6–0)	Huey Long Field House; Baton Rouge, Louisiana
Feb 7, 1953		Tulane	W 48–31	14–1 (7–0)	Huey Long Field House; Baton Rouge, Louisiana
Feb 10, 1953		at Florida	W 68–56	15–1 (8–0)	Florida Gymnasium; Gainesville, Florida
Feb 14, 1953		at Auburn	W 65–57	16–1 (9–0)	Auburn Sports Arena; Auburn, Alabama
Feb 21, 1953		Georgia Tech	W 76–52	17–1 (10–0)	Huey Long Field House; Baton Rouge, Louisiana
Feb 23, 1953		Ole Miss	W 63–48	18–1 (11–0)	Huey Long Field House; Baton Rouge, Louisiana
Feb 27, 1953		Mississippi State	W 82–47	19–1 (12–0)	Huey Long Field House; Baton Rouge, Louisiana
Mar 6, 1953		at Tulane	W 53–52	20–1 (13–0)	Avron B. Fogelman Arena; New Orleans, Louisiana
NCAA Tournament
Mar 13, 1953*	No. 7	vs. Lebanon Valley	W 89–76	21–1	Reynolds Coliseum; Raleigh, North Carolina
Mar 14, 1953*	No. 7	vs. Holy Cross	W 81–73	22–1	Reynolds Coliseum; Raleigh, North Carolina
Mar 17, 1953*	No. 7	vs. No. 1 Indiana; National Semifinal – Final Four	L 67–80	22–2	Municipal Auditorium; Kansas City, Missouri
Mar 18, 1953*	No. 7	vs. No. 2 Washington; Consolation	L 69–88	22–3	Municipal Auditorium (10,500); Kansas City, Missouri
*Non-conference game. ^{#}Rankings from AP Poll. (#) Tournament seedings in parentheses. E1=East-1.

== Awards and honors ==
- Bob Pettit – Consensus Second-Team All-American
