= 1952–53 Washington State Cougars men's basketball team =

American college basketball season

1952–53 Washington State Cougars men's basketball
- Conference: Pacific Coast Conference
- Record: 7–27 (3–13 PCC)
- Head coach: Jack Friel (25th season)
- Home arena: Bohler Gymnasium

1952–53 Pacific Coast Conference men's basketball standings
	Conf.				Overall
Team	W		L	PCT	W		L	PCT
North
No. 4 Washington †	15	–	1	.938	30	–	3	.909
Idaho	8	–	8	.500	15	–	12	.556
Oregon	8	–	8	.500	14	–	14	.500
Oregon State	6	–	10	.375	11	–	18	.379
Washington State	3	–	13	.188	7	–	27	.206
South
California	9	–	3	.750	16	–	10	.615
USC	7	–	5	.583	17	–	5	.773
UCLA	6	–	0	1.000	16	–	8	.667
Stanford	2	–	10	.167	7	–	20	.259
† Conference playoff series winner Rankings from AP Poll

The 1952–53 Washington State Cougars men's basketball team represented Washington State College for the 1952–53 NCAA college basketball season. Led by 25th-year head coach Jack Friel, the Cougars were members of the Pacific Coast Conference and played their home games on campus at Bohler Gymnasium in Pullman, Washington.

The Cougars were 7–27 overall in the regular season and 3–13 in conference play, last in the Northern division.
