= 1952–53 Iowa State Cyclones men's basketball team =

American college basketball season

1952–53 Iowa State Cyclones men's basketball
- Conference: Big Seven Conference
- Record: 10–11 (5–7 Big Seven)
- Head coach: Clay Sutherland (6th season)
- Home arena: Iowa State Armory

1952–53 Big Seven Conference men's basketball standings
	Conf.				Overall
Team	W		L	PCT	W		L	PCT
No. 3 Kansas	10	–	2	.833	19	–	6	.760
No. 12 Kansas State	9	–	3	.750	17	–	4	.810
Missouri	6	–	6	.500	11	–	9	.550
Iowa State	5	–	7	.417	10	–	11	.476
Oklahoma	5	–	7	.417	8	–	13	.381
Nebraska	4	–	8	.333	9	–	11	.450
Colorado	3	–	9	.250	10	–	11	.476
Rankings from AP Poll

The 1952–53 Iowa State Cyclones men's basketball team represented Iowa State University during the 1952–53 NCAA men's basketball season. The Cyclones were coached by Clay Sutherland, who was in his sixth season with the Cyclones. They played their home games at the Iowa State Armory in Ames, Iowa.

They finished the season 10–11, 5–7 in Big Seven play to finish in a tie for fourth place.

== Roster ==
1952–53 Iowa State Cyclones men's basketball team
Players
Coaches

Pos.	#	Name	Height	Weight	Year	Hometown
F		Barney Alleman	6 ft 2 in (1.88 m)	—	So	Ankeny, Iowa
G		Virg Byerly	5 ft 10 in (1.78 m)	—		Boone, Iowa
F		Bill Christiansen	—	—		Clinton, Iowa
F		Jerry Davis	6 ft 0 in (1.83 m)	—	Jr	Ottumwa, Iowa
F		Don DeKoster	6 ft 3 in (1.91 m)	—		Spencer, Iowa
C		Delmar Diercks (C)	6 ft 8 in (2.03 m)	—	Sr	Mason City, Iowa
C		Chuck Duncan	6 ft 5 in (1.96 m)	—	So	Atlantic, Iowa
G		Julian Erickson	—	—		Rodman, Iowa
F		Stanley Frahm	6 ft 3 in (1.91 m)	—		Manning, Iowa
F		Howie Franks	6 ft 3 in (1.91 m)	—		Fort Dodge, Iowa
F		Howie Johnson	6 ft 3 in (1.91 m)	—		Shenandoah, Iowa
F		Paul Koch	6 ft 4 in (1.93 m)	—
G		Sam Long (C)	5 ft 11 in (1.8 m)	—	Sr	Ottumwa, Iowa
F		George Rosenfeld	—	—		Storm Lake, Iowa
F		Clare Russie	—	—		Marshalltown, Iowa
		Irv Sheperd	—	—
G		Carl VanCleave	6 ft 3 in (1.91 m)	—	Jr	Montezuma, Iowa
G		Larry Wetter	5 ft 11 in (1.8 m)	—		Rinard, Iowa

Head coach

- Clay Sutherland

Assistant coach(es)

Legend

- (C) Team captain
- (S) Suspended
- (I) Ineligible
- (W) Walk-on
- Injured
- Current redshirt

== Schedule and results ==
Date time, TV	Rank^{#}	Opponent^{#}	Result	Record	Site city, state
Regular season
December 6, 1952*; 7:30 pm		South Dakota State	W 70–47	1–0	Iowa State Armory; Ames, Iowa
December 8, 1952*; 7:30 pm		Truman State (Kirksville Teachers)	W 81–57	2–0	Iowa State Armory; Ames, Iowa
December 13, 1952*; 8:15 pm		at Bradley	L 57–76	2–1	Robertson Memorial Field House; Peoria, Illinois
December 22, 1952*; 7:30 pm		Drake; Iowa Big Four	L 63–73	2–2	Iowa State Armory; Ames, Iowa
December 26, 1952*; 9:45 pm		vs. Missouri; Big Seven Holiday Tournament Quarterfinals	L 61–63	2–3	Municipal Auditorium; Kansas City, Missouri
December 29, 1952*; 2:00 pm		vs. Nebraska; Big Seven Holiday Tournament Consolation Semifinals	L 79–83	2–4	Municipal Auditorium; Kansas City, Missouri
December 30, 1952*; 2:00 pm		vs. Oklahoma; Big Seven Holiday Tournament Seventh Place	W 79–76	3–4	Municipal Auditorium; Kansas City, Missouri
January 5, 1953; 8:00 pm		at Missouri	L 61–66	3–5 (0–1)	Brewer Fieldhouse; Columbia, Missouri
January 10, 1953; 7:30 pm		Kansas	L 57–76	3–6 (0–2)	Iowa State Armory; Ames, Iowa
January 17, 1953; 7:30 pm		at Nebraska	W 78–60	4–6 (1–2)	Nebraska Coliseum; Lincoln, Nebraska
January 21, 1953*; 8:15 pm		at Drake; Iowa Big Four	W 69–64	5–6	Drake Fieldhouse; Des Moines, Iowa
January 24, 1953*; 7:30 pm		Creighton	W 87–49	6–6	Iowa State Armory; Ames, Iowa
January 31, 1953; 8:05 pm		at No. 5 Kansas State	L 78–81	6–7 (1–3)	Ahearn Fieldhouse; Manhattan, Kansas
February 2, 1953; 8:00 pm		at Oklahoma	W 73–69	7–7 (2–3)	OU Field House; Norman, Oklahoma
February 7, 1953; 7:30 pm		Colorado	L 67–75	7–8 (2–4)	Iowa State Armory; Ames, Iowa
February 9, 1953; 7:30 pm		No. 5 Kansas State	L 64–74	7–9 (2–5)	Iowa State Armory; Ames, Iowa
February 16, 1953; 7:30 pm		Missouri	L 74–78	7–10 (2–6)	Iowa State Armory; Ames, Iowa
February 21, 1953; 7:30 pm		Oklahoma	W 70–59	8–10 (3–6)	Iowa State Armory; Ames, Iowa
March 2, 1953; 7:30 pm		Nebraska	W 93–66	9–10 (4–6)	Iowa State Armory; Ames, Iowa
March 6, 1953; 8:00 pm		at No. 6 Kansas	L 62–87	9–11 (4–7)	Hoch Auditorium; Lawrence, Kansas
March 9, 1953; 9:00 pm		Colorado	W 69–48	10–11 (5–7)	Balch Fieldhouse; Boulder, Colorado
*Non-conference game. ^{#}Rankings from AP poll. (#) Tournament seedings in parentheses. All times are in Central Time.
