= 1952–53 UCLA Bruins men's basketball team =

American college basketball season

1952–53 UCLA Bruins men's basketball
- Conference: Pacific Coast Conference
- Record: 16–8 (6–6 PCC)
- Head coach: John R. Wooden (5th season)
- Assistant coaches: Jerry Norman; Doug Sale
- Home arena: Men's Gym

1952–53 Pacific Coast Conference men's basketball standings
	Conf.				Overall
Team	W		L	PCT	W		L	PCT
North
No. 4 Washington †	15	–	1	.938	30	–	3	.909
Idaho	8	–	8	.500	15	–	12	.556
Oregon	8	–	8	.500	14	–	14	.500
Oregon State	6	–	10	.375	11	–	18	.379
Washington State	3	–	13	.188	7	–	27	.206
South
California	9	–	3	.750	16	–	10	.615
USC	7	–	5	.583	17	–	5	.773
UCLA	6	–	0	1.000	16	–	8	.667
Stanford	2	–	10	.167	7	–	20	.259
† Conference playoff series winner Rankings from AP Poll

The 1952–53 UCLA Bruins men's basketball team represented the University of California, Los Angeles during the 1952–53 NCAA men's basketball season and were members of the Pacific Coast Conference. The Bruins were led by fifth year head coach John Wooden. They finished the regular season with a record of 16–8 and finished 3rd in the PCC Southern Division with a record of 8–4.

== Previous season ==
The Bruins finished the regular season with a record of 19–12 and won the southern division championship with a record of 8–4. They defeated the Washington Huskies in the conference play-offs and lost to Santa Clara in the NCAA regional semifinals and Oklahoma City in the regional consolation game.

== Roster ==
1952–53 UCLA Bruins men's basketball team
Players
Coaches

Pos.	#	Name	Height	Weight	Year	Hometown
F	57	Ron Bane	6 ft 2 in (1.88 m)	—	So
G	24	Courtney Borio	5 ft 10 in (1.78 m)	—	So
F	56	Don Bragg	6 ft 4 in (1.93 m)	—	So
G		Mark Costello	6 ft 2 in (1.88 m)	—	So	El Monte, California
G	72	Jack Davidson	6 ft 2 in (1.88 m)	—	Sr
F	59	Jerry Evans	6 ft 3 in (1.91 m)	—
C		Mike Hibler	6 ft 7 in (2.01 m)	—	Jr
G		Bill Johnston	6 ft 4 in (1.93 m)	—
G	75	Ron Livingston	5 ft 10 in (1.78 m)	—	Jr
G	70	Gene Logan	6 ft 1 in (1.85 m)	—
F	32	John Moore	6 ft 5 in (1.96 m)	—	So
G	71	Barry Porter (C)	6 ft 1 in (1.85 m)	—	Sr
F	54	Dick Ridgway	6 ft 4 in (1.93 m)	—	Jr
F		Hank Steinman	6 ft 2 in (1.88 m)	—
F	76	Ed White	6 ft 2 in (1.88 m)	—
F	53	Tommy Williams	6 ft 2 in (1.88 m)	—

Head coach

John Wooden (Purdue)

Assistant coach(es)

- Jerry Norman (UCLA)
- Doug Sale

Legend

- (C) Team captain
- (S) Suspended
- (I) Ineligible
- (W) Walk-on
- Injured
- Current redshirt

Roster
Last update: 30 January 2018

== Schedule ==
Date time, TV	Rank^{#}	Opponent^{#}	Result	Record	Site city, state
Regular Season
December 5, 1952		at Oregon State	W 73–63	1–0	Oregon State Coliseum; Corvallis, OR
December 6, 1952		at Oregon State	W 58–43	2–0	Oregon State Coliseum; Corvallis, OR
December 12, 1952		Washington	L 49–53	2–1	Men's Gym; Los Angeles, CA
December 13, 1952		Washington	W 54–47	3–1	Men's Gym; Los Angeles, CA
December 19, 1952*	No. 12	at Michigan State	W 60–55	4–1	Jenison Fieldhouse; East Lansing, MI
December 20, 1952*	No. 12	vs. No. 7 Notre Dame	L 60–68	4–2	Jenison Fieldhouse; East Lansing, MI
December 22, 1952*	No. 12	at Bradley	W 91–83	5–2	Robertson Memorial Field House; Peoria, IL
December 26, 1952	No. 20	Oregon State	W 74–58	6–2	Men's Gym; Los Angeles, CA
December 27, 1952	No. 20	Oregon State	W 69–61	7–2	Men's Gym; Los Angeles, CA
January 2, 1953		California	L 68–72	7–3 (0–1)	Men's Gym; Los Angeles, CA
January 3, 1953		California	L 66–68	7–4 (0–2)	Men's Gym; Los Angeles, CA
January 9, 1953		No. 12 USC	L 54–65	7–5 (0–3)	Men's Gym; Los Angeles, CA
January 10, 1953		No. 12 USC	W 72–62	8–5 (1–3)	Men's Gym; Los Angeles, CA
January 16, 1953	No. 19	at Stanford	W 67–66	9–5 (2–3)	Stanford Pavilion; Stanford, CA
January 17, 1953	No. 19	at Stanford	W 74–71	10–5 (3–3)	Stanford Pavilion; Stanford, CA
January 30, 1953*		San Diego State	W 77–48	11–5	Men's Gym; Los Angeles, CA
February 5, 1953*		Bradley	W 79–73	12–5	Men's Gym; Los Angeles, CA
February 6, 1953*		UC Santa Barbara	W 91–50	13–5	Men's Gym; Los Angeles, CA
February 13, 1953		at No. 19 California	W 67–63	14–5 (4–3)	Men's Gym; Berkeley, CA
February 14, 1953		at No. 19 California	L 62–70	14–6 (4–4)	Men's Gym; Berkeley, CA
February 20, 1953		Stanford	W 75–50	15–6 (5–4)	Men's Gym; Los Angeles, CA
February 21, 1953		Stanford	W 66–58	16–6 (6–4)	Men's Gym; Los Angeles, CA
February 27, 1953		at USC	L 65–66	16–7 (6–5)	Pan-Pacific Auditorium; Los Angeles, CA
February 28, 1953		at USC	L 64–76	16–8 (6–6)	Pan-Pacific Auditorium; Los Angeles, CA
*Non-conference game. ^{#}Rankings from AP Poll. (#) Tournament seedings in parentheses. All times are in Pacific Time.
