= 1952–53 Idaho Vandals men's basketball team =

American college basketball season

1952–53 Idaho Vandals men's basketball
- Conference: Pacific Coast Conference
- Record: 15–12 (8–8 PCC)
- Head coach: Charles Finley (6th season)
- Assistant coach: Art Smith
- MVP: Tom Flynn
- Home arena: Memorial Gymnasium

1952–53 Pacific Coast Conference men's basketball standings
	Conf.				Overall
Team	W		L	PCT	W		L	PCT
North
No. 4 Washington †	15	–	1	.938	30	–	3	.909
Idaho	8	–	8	.500	15	–	12	.556
Oregon	8	–	8	.500	14	–	14	.500
Oregon State	6	–	10	.375	11	–	18	.379
Washington State	3	–	13	.188	7	–	27	.206
South
California	9	–	3	.750	16	–	10	.615
USC	7	–	5	.583	17	–	5	.773
UCLA	6	–	0	1.000	16	–	8	.667
Stanford	2	–	10	.167	7	–	20	.259
† Conference playoff series winner Rankings from AP Poll

The 1952–53 Idaho Vandals men's basketball team represented the University of Idaho during the 1952–53 NCAA college basketball season. Members of the Pacific Coast Conference, the Vandals were led by sixth-year head coach Charles Finley and played their home games on campus at Memorial Gymnasium in Moscow, Idaho.

The Vandals were 15–12 overall and 8–8 in conference play. Late in the season, Idaho handed the third-ranked and Final Four-bound Washington Huskies their sole conference loss.
