= Don Bragg (basketball) =

American basketball player (1933–1985)

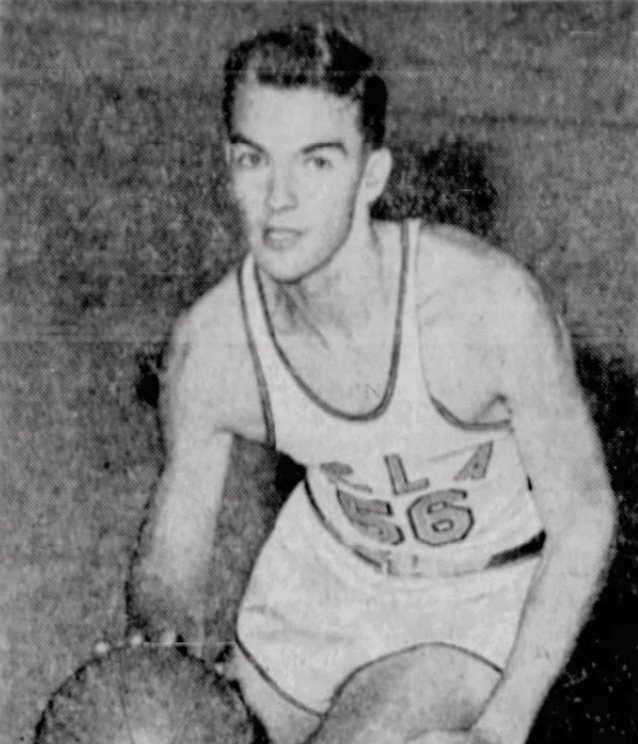
- Bragg with UCLA c. 1954

Personal information
- Born: February 24, 1933 San Francisco, California, U.S.
- Died: November 2, 1985 (aged 52) Los Angeles, California, U.S.
- Listed height: 6 ft 4 in (1.93 m)

Career information
- High school: Galileo (San Francisco, California)
- College: UCLA (1951–1955)
- NBA draft: 1955: 7th round, 54th overall pick
- Drafted by: Minneapolis Lakers
- Position: Forward / Guard

Career history
- 1955–1956: Los Angeles Kirby's Shoes
- 1956–1958: Air Force All-Stars

Career highlights
- AAU champion (1957); 3× Honorable mention All-American (1953–1955); 2× First-team PCC All-Southern Division (1954, 1955); Second-team PCC All-Southern Division (1953); California Mr. Basketball (1950)
- Stats at Basketball Reference

Donald Edward Bragg (February 24, 1933 – November 2, 1985) was an American college basketball player for the UCLA Bruins. Three times he earned honorable mention as an All-American. He was inducted into the UCLA Athletics Hall of Fame.

Bragg was named California Mr. Basketball as the state's top high school player in 1950. Playing in the Pacific Coast Conference (PCC) with UCLA, he was a three-time All-Southern Division selection, including twice on the first team. Bragg later served in the United States Air Force, where he won an Amateur Athletic Union (AAU) championship with the Air Force All-Stars basketball team. He became a savings and loan executive.

== Early life ==
Bragg was born in San Francisco on February 24, 1933. He attended Galileo High School, where he was an honors student with almost straight A's while playing basketball as a center. In 1950, he was named California Mr. Basketball, and helped the Lions to their first undisputed San Francisco championship since Hank Luisetti graduated in 1934. Bragg lettered three years and was a three-time All-City selection. In his final two seasons, he was voted the Northern California player of the year.

== Basketball career ==
=== College career ===
Bragg was leaning towards attending the University of California, Berkeley, but switched to the University of California, Los Angeles, after working for a month in Los Angeles and living at a UCLA fraternity in the summer of 1950. As a freshman for the Bruins in 1951–52, he played on the varsity team. The National Collegiate Athletic Association (NCAA) had temporarily permitted freshmen to play because many students were leaving college to serve in the Korean War. Bragg was converted to a forward at UCLA, as head coach John Wooden decided that he was not tall enough at 6 feet 4 inches (1.93 m) to continue at his high school position. He helped the Bruins win the Southern Division and PCC titles, winning two of three games over Washington to win the conference championship. Leading up to the 1952 NCAA tournament, he broke a toe while stumbling coming out of the shower. UCLA lost both of their games with him hobbled. During the season, he consistently scored in double figures, and he ranked second on the team in rebounds behind Don Johnson. Bragg's 186 rebounds remained the UCLA varsity freshman season record until 1989, when it was broken by Don MacLean. (Note: MacLean finished the season with 231.) A top defender, Bragg received honorable mention in voting by coaches for the PCC All-Southern Division team.

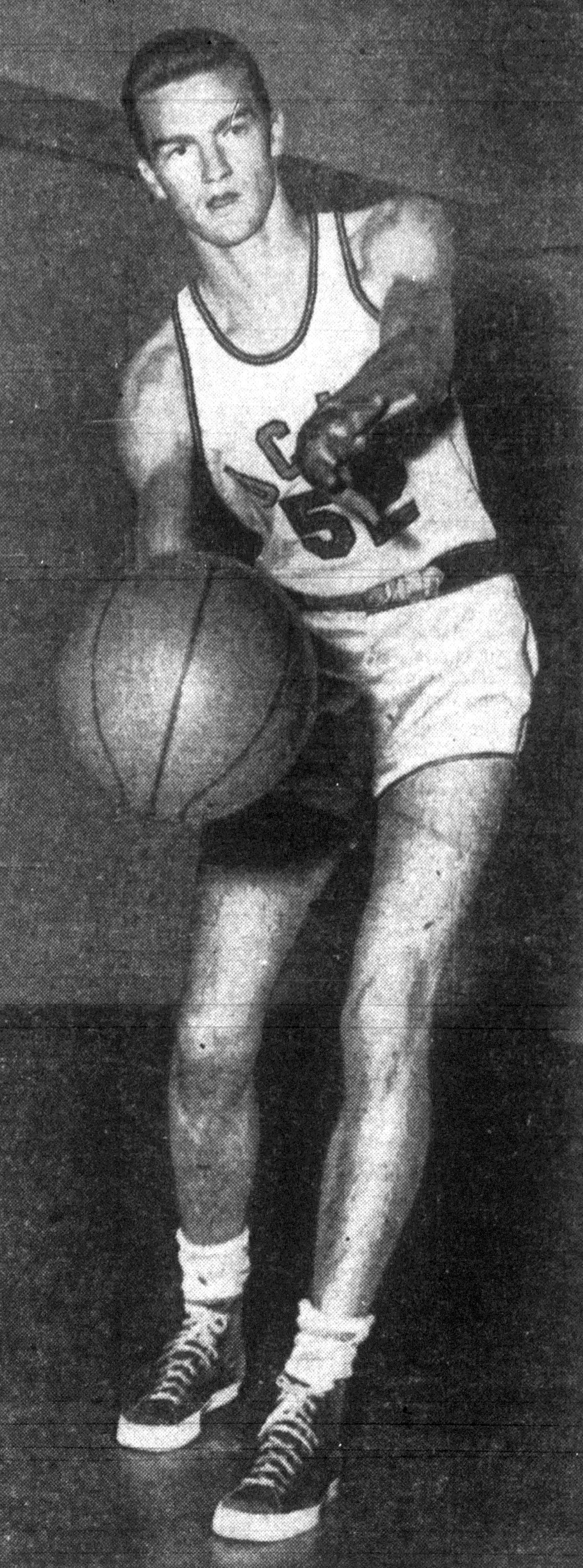
Bragg was a three-time honorable mention All-American at UCLA.

In 1952–53, Bragg was moved to guard to compensate for the Bruins' lack of height and defensive rebounding in their backcourt following Johnson's graduation. Bragg earned second-team All-Southern Division honors at guard, which he played the rest of his career, and received honorable mention from the Associated Press (AP) and United Press (UP) for their All-American teams. UCLA finished in third place with a 6–6 conference record after four seasons of finishing at least tied for first in the Southern Division. In his junior year in 1953–54, he was named an honorable mention All-American by AP, UP, and International News Service (INS) and was voted first-team All-Southern Division with fellow Bruins guard Ron Livingston. Bragg and John Moore were co-captains of the 1954–55 team, which won the Southern Division before losing the conference championship 2–0 to Oregon State. Bragg again was voted first-team All-Southern Division, while INS and UP named him an honorable mention All-American. Wooden said that he was "a great offensive leader, but few realize he is the best defensive leader there is". Bragg was inducted into the UCLA Athletics Hall of Fame in 1994.

=== AAU career ===
After college, Bragg was selected by the Minneapolis Lakers (now Los Angeles) in the seventh round of the 1955 NBA draft with the 54th overall pick, but he chose not to play professionally. He played AAU basketball for Los Angeles Kirby's Shoes, teaming with former Bruins Ron Bane and Chuck Clustka. Kirby's won the Los Angeles Major AAU League title in February 1956, when Bragg was also named to the league's all-star team. An Air Force Reserve Officer Training Corps cadet at UCLA, he served as an Air Force officer and pilot. That February, he was assigned to Lackland Air Force Base.

Bragg was named to the Air Force All-Stars basketball team, which won the Armed Forces Tournament over the Army, Navy, and Marines in 1956. He was a starter on their 1957 squad that won the Air Force's first AAU championship. Bragg then joined Sheppard Air Force Base, where he was named to the 1958 All-Air Force first team by the Air Force Times. He led the Senators to the Air Training Command championship and was voted the tournament's outstanding player. Sheppard won the World-Wide Air Force Basketball Tournament, and Bragg was named to the all-tournament team. They finished the season with a 34–5 record.

== Later years ==
Holding a BS in accounting from UCLA, Bragg earned an MBA at Stanford University. He became an executive with Pauley Petroleum and Great Western Savings. He joined Great Western in 1962 before being elected as a vice president in 1966. Bragg was named executive vice president of their subsidiary First Savings and Loan Association in 1968, before returning to Great Western Savings in an executive VP role in 1973. He also served as treasurer of the UCLA Alumni Association and was a member of the UCLA Foundation board of trustees.

Bragg was married and had three sons, including Mark, a general authority for the The Church of Jesus Christ of Latter-day Saints. On November 2, 1985, Bragg died in Los Angeles at age 52. According to his father, he had an apparent heart attack after his typical Saturday morning workout.

== Accomplishments and awards ==
- AAU champion (1957)
- World-Wide Air Force Basketball Tournament champion (1958)
- World-Wide Air Force Basketball Tournament All-Tournament (1958)
- First-team All-Air Force (1958)
- Los Angeles Major AAU League All-Star (1956)
- Honorable mention All-American – INS, UPI (1955)
- Honorable mention All-American – AP, INS, UPI (1954)
- Honorable mention All-American – AP, UPI (1953)
- 2× First-team PCC All-Southern Division (1954, 1955)
- Second-team PCC All-Southern Division (1953)
- Honorable mention PCC All-Southern Division (1952)
- UCLA Athletics Hall of Fame
- California Mr. Basketball (1950)
