= 1952–53 Washington Huskies men's basketball team =

American college basketball season

1952–53 Washington Huskies men's basketball
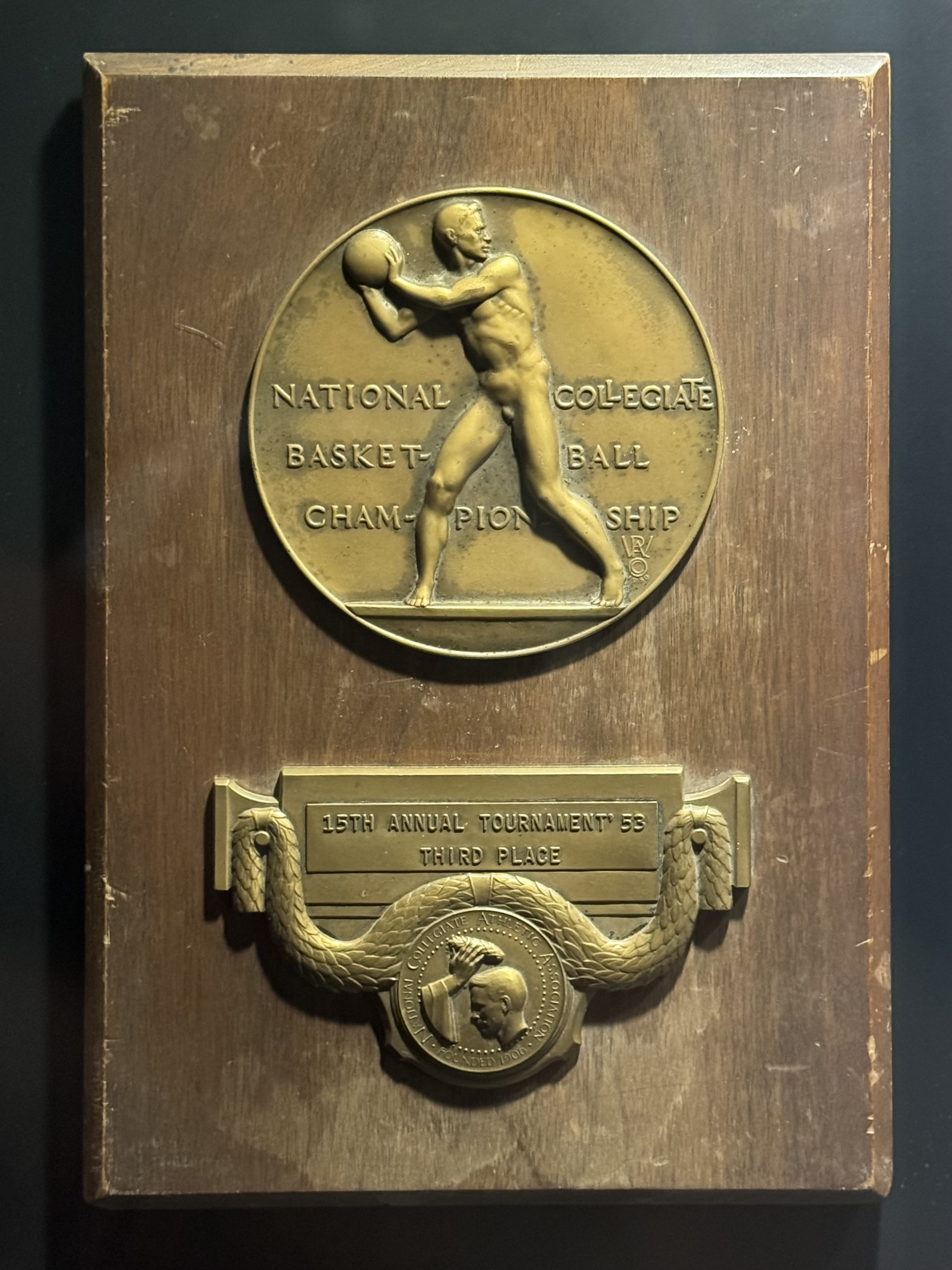

Pacific Coast Conference Champions

NCAA tournament, Third place
- Conference: Pacific Coast Conference

Ranking
- Coaches: No. 3
- AP: No. 4
- Record: 30–3 (15–1 PCC)
- Head coach: Tippy Dye (3rd season)
- Home arena: Hec Edmundson Pavilion

1952–53 Pacific Coast Conference men's basketball standings
	Conf.				Overall
Team	W		L	PCT	W		L	PCT
North
No. 4 Washington †	15	–	1	.938	30	–	3	.909
Idaho	8	–	8	.500	15	–	12	.556
Oregon	8	–	8	.500	14	–	14	.500
Oregon State	6	–	10	.375	11	–	18	.379
Washington State	3	–	13	.188	7	–	27	.206
South
California	9	–	3	.750	16	–	10	.615
USC	7	–	5	.583	17	–	5	.773
UCLA	6	–	0	1.000	16	–	8	.667
Stanford	2	–	10	.167	7	–	20	.259
† Conference playoff series winner Rankings from AP Poll

The 1952–53 Washington Huskies men's basketball team represented the University of Washington for the 1952–53 NCAA college basketball season. Led by third-year head coach Tippy Dye, the Huskies were members of the Pacific Coast Conference and played their home games on campus at Hec Edmundson Pavilion in Seattle, Washington.

The Huskies were 25–2 overall in the regular season and 15–1 in conference play; they won the PCC title series with a two-game sweep of Southern division winner California, and climbed to second in the AP poll.

In the 22-team NCAA tournament, Washington won twice in Corvallis, Oregon, over Seattle and Santa Clara, and advanced to the Final Four in Kansas City, Missouri. In the semifinal against defending champion Kansas, the Huskies lost by 26 points in front of a partisan crowd, then defeated LSU by nineteen points in the consolation game to take third place. Indiana won the title by a point.

The Huskies were led on the floor by All-American center Bob Houbregs and guard Joe Cipriano, later the head coach at Idaho and Nebraska.

Washington's next NCAA Tournament appearance was 23 years later in 1976; their first National Invitation Tournament (NIT) appearance was in 1980.

== Postseason results ==
Date time, TV	Rank^{#}	Opponent^{#}	Result	Record	Site (attendance) city, state
Pacific Coast Conference Playoff Series
Fri, March 6; 8:00 pm	No. 4	California; Game One	W 60–47	26–2	Hec Edmundson Pavilion (11,400); Seattle, Washington
Sat, March 7; 8:00 pm	No. 4	California; Game Two	W 80–57	27–2	Hec Edmundson Pavilion (11,600); Seattle, Washington
NCAA tournament
Fri, March 13*; 7:30 pm	No. 2	vs. No. 14 Seattle; First round	W 92–70	28–2	Gill Coliseum (10,200); Corvallis, Oregon
Sat, March 14*; 9:30 pm	No. 2	vs. Santa Clara; Quarterfinal	W 74–62	29–2	Gill Coliseum; Corvallis, Oregon
Tue, March 17*; 7:45 pm	No. 2	vs. No. 5 Kansas; Semifinal	L 53–79	29–3	Municipal Auditorium (10,500); Kansas City, Missouri
Wed, March 18*; 5:45 pm	No. 2	vs. No. 7 LSU; Consolation	W 88–69	30–3	Municipal Auditorium (10,500); Kansas City, Missouri
*Non-conference game. ^{#}Rankings from AP Poll. (#) Tournament seedings in parentheses. All times are in Pacific time.
