= John Moore (basketball) =

American basketball player (1933–1987)

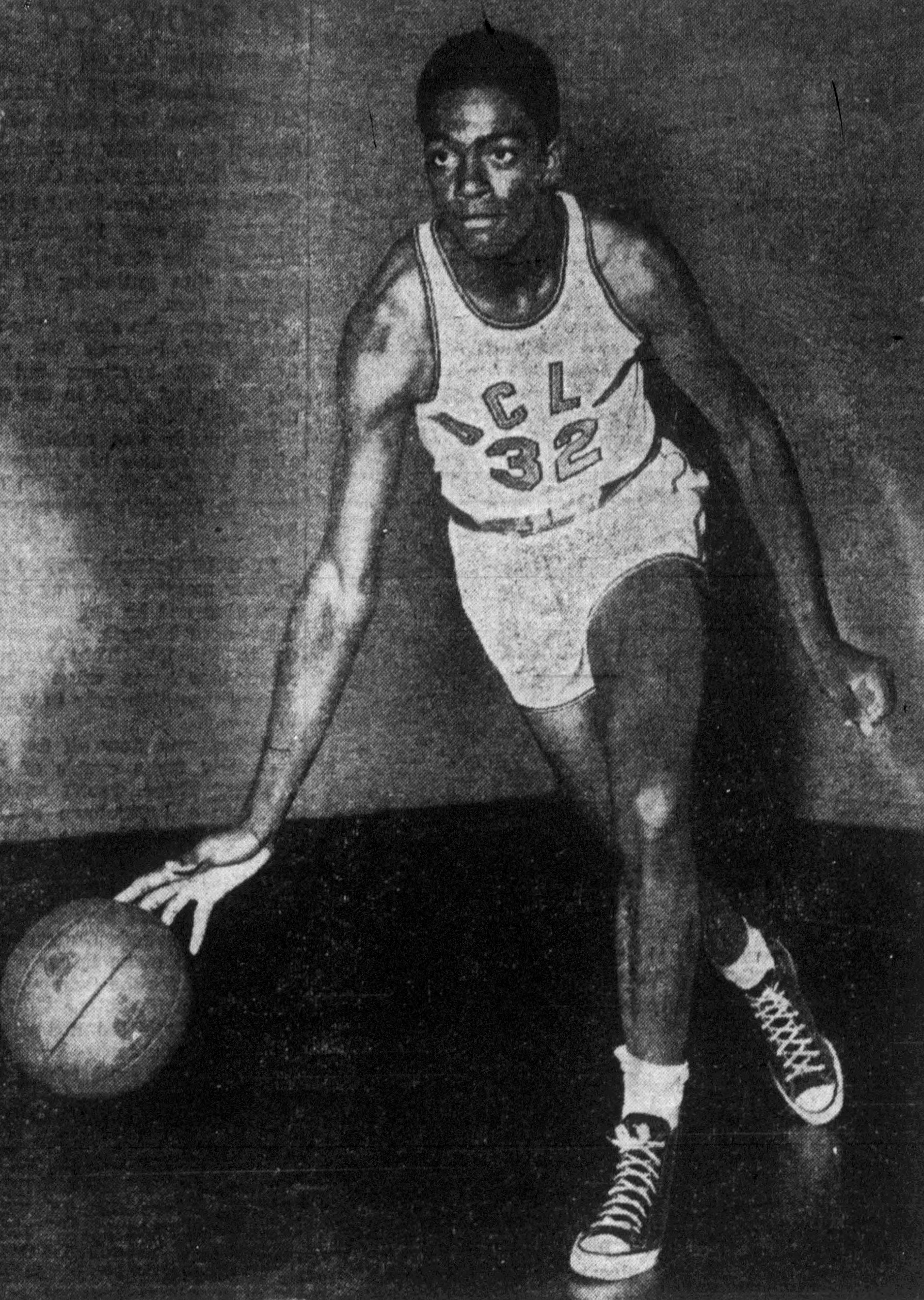
- Moore c. 1954

Personal information
- Born: 1933 Gary, Indiana, U.S.
- Died: February 11, 1987 (aged 53)
- Listed height: 6 ft 5 in (1.96 m)
- Listed weight: 198 lb (90 kg)

Career information
- High school: Froebel (Gary, Indiana)
- College: UCLA (1951–1955)
- NBA draft: 1955: 7th round, 52nd overall pick
- Drafted by: Boston Celtics
- Position: Forward

Career history
- 1955: Los Angeles Kirby's Shoes

Career highlights
- 2× Honorable mention All-American (1954, 1955); First-team PCC All-Southern Division (1955); 2× Second-team PCC All-Southern Division (1953, 1954)
- Stats at Basketball Reference

John William Moore (1933 (Note: His age in one source implies that he was born in 1932/1933, while his age in another indicates that it was 1933/1934.) – February 11, 1987) was an American college basketball player for the UCLA Bruins. Twice he earned honorable mention as an All-American. He was inducted into the UCLA Athletics Hall of Fame.

Playing with UCLA in the Pacific Coast Conference (PCC), Moore was voted All-Southern Division three times, including a first-team selection. After being drafted and serving in the Army, he tried out for the National Basketball Association (NBA) with the Boston Celtics, who had selected him two years earlier in the 1955 NBA draft. Moore was also a player and coach in the Amateur Athletic Union (AAU). He became an executive in the financial industry.

== Early life ==
Moore was born in Gary, Indiana, where he attended Froebel High School. Standing at 6 feet 5 inches (1.96 m), he played basketball as a center and was team captain as a senior in 1951. He averaged 19.1 points per game that year, earning All-State honors and a second straight All-Northern Indiana team selection. His coach called him better than Dave Minor, a Froebel alumnus who became an All-Southern Division basketball player at the University of California, Los Angeles, (UCLA) in 1948. Moore also lettered for four years on Froebel's track and cross country teams, and served as student body president. The Indiana Basketball Hall of Fame named him to their 1976 Silver Anniversary All Star basketball team.

In the spring of 1951, Bruins assistant coach Ed Powell visited Moore at his home. Upon learning that UCLA's student body president was Black, Moore's mother said "this is where he's going to school".

== Basketball career ==
=== College career ===
Moore was the second Black athlete recruited to UCLA by their head coach, John Wooden. Senior forward Bobby Pounds, who joined the Bruins from junior college in 1950, was the first. In his first year in 1951–52, Moore played on the varsity team with fellow freshmen Ron Bane, Don Bragg, and Mark Costello. The National Collegiate Athletic Association (NCAA) had temporarily permitted freshmen to play because many students were leaving college to serve in the Korean War. Before Moore's first game, Powell asked him if he was excited to play in front of a packed Men's Gym, which held under 2,000. Moore responded, "Sir, my last high school game was played at Butler Fieldhouse, and it seats 18,000 people. So no, sir, this crowd won't bother me." After Christmas, UCLA had a three-game road trip in the Midwest. For the first game against Kentucky, the Bruins stayed in a hotel in Cincinnati, 90 miles (140 km) away from Lexington, Kentucky. They chose to bus into and out of Lexington because the city's hotels were segregated, and Moore and Pounds would have had to be separated from the team. UCLA won their fourth consecutive Southern Division title that season, and they defeated Washington for their second straight PCC championship.

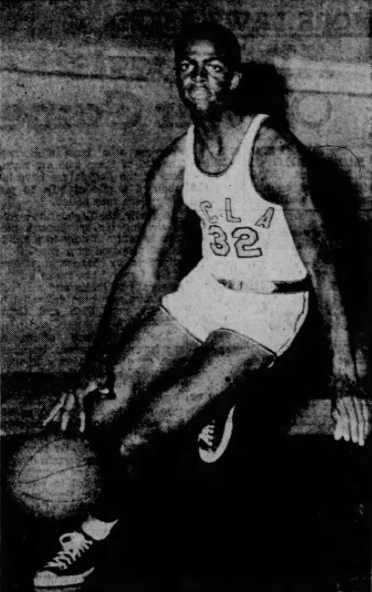
Moore finished his UCLA career as the school's all-time leading scorer.

The following season in 1952–53, UCLA finished in third place with a 6–6 conference record after four seasons of finishing at least tied for first in the Southern Division. Moore led the team in scoring with 315 points, averaging 12.6 per game, and was voted second-team All-Southern Division. The United Press (UP) named him an honorable mention All-American in 1953–54, when he was again a second-team All-Southern Division selection.

As a senior in 1954–55, Moore was co-captain of the team with Bragg. He was one of three Black starters for UCLA who were averaging double figures in scoring, including Willie Naulls and Morris Taft. In January 1955, Moore scored 45 points in a two-game series against USC to become the first Bruin to score 1,000 points in their career. In February, he was dropped from the Air Force Reserve Officer Training Corps because his 20/30 vision was too poor for him to qualify for pilot training. UCLA won the Southern Division before losing the PCC championship 2–0 to Oregon State. Moore ended his career as the school's all-time scoring leader with 1,202 points. (Note: Broken by Naulls the following season, finishing his career with 1,225 points.) Bragg also finished with over a thousand at 1,023. Moore was voted an honorable mention All-American by UP and the Associated Press, and the Helms Athletic Foundation named him a second-team All-American. (Note: AP and UP were used to compile the consensus All-American team that season. Helms had been used in the past (1929–1948).) He joined Bragg and Naulls as first-team All-Southern Division selections. Moore became the first player to twice win the Caddy Works award, which honors a Bruin "selected for his competitive spirit, inspiration and unselfish contribution to the team". In 2007, he was posthumously inducted into the UCLA Athletics Hall of Fame.

=== AAU and Army career ===
In March 1955, Moore played for Los Angeles Kirby's Shoes at the AAU national tournament, advancing to the quarterfinals. In April, he was selected by the Boston Celtics in the seventh round of the 1955 NBA draft with the 52nd overall pick. He had already been drafted into the Army, but The Boston Daily Globe wrote that he was still "highly regarded for the future".

Moore received basic training at Fort Ord in Monterey, California. He was stationed in Virginia at Fort Lee, where he played for their Travellers basketball team. In 1955–56, their only returnees were their coach, Jim Wright, and 6-foot-7-inch (2.01 m) center Ben McNeil. In their season opener, Moore had 27 points and 21 rebounds in a 99–46 win over Fort Story. He averaged over 20 points per game for the season, and scored 28.5 points per game in six Second Army tournament games. The following season, Moore and 6-foot-6-inch (1.98 m) John Walissa from Memphis State were Fort Lee's main scorers.

In May 1957, Moore signed a one-year contract with the Celtics for the 1957–58 season; he was expected to be discharged from the Army within a month. He reported to the Celtics' training camp in September. Boston was coming off its first league championship in 1956–57, and most of their regulars seemed assured of a roster spot. The Globe called Moore "long sought after upon graduating from UCLA". The Celtics released him in October.

Moore became an AAU coach for Broadway Federal, a team of all Blacks. In 1961, he signed to play with the Los Angeles Jets of the American Basketball League. In 1963, he was a player-coach for Entre Nous' all-Black squad in Los Angeles Valley College's Lion summer basketball league. They lost in the championship game to Powers Realty.

== Later years ==
After the Army, Moore worked in the financial industry. By the 1970s, he was an executive at Wells Fargo and later an assistant vice president and branch manager for Great Western Savings and Loan Association in Beverly Hills, California. After a long illness, Moore died at age 53 on February 11, 1987.
