= 1952–53 NCAA men's basketball rankings =

- Season: 1952–53
- NCAA Tournament: 1953
- NCAA Tournament Champions: Indiana
NCAA men's basketball rankings


The 1952–53 NCAA men's basketball rankings was made up of two human polls, the AP Poll and the Coaches Poll.

== Legend ==
	Increase in ranking
	Decrease in ranking
	New to rankings from previous week
Italics	Number of first place votes
(#–#)	Win–loss record
т	Tied with team above or below also with this symbol

== AP Poll ==
	Week 2 Dec. 16	Week 3 Dec. 23	Week 4 Dec. 30	Week 5 Jan. 6	Week 6 Jan. 13	Week 7 Jan. 20	Week 8 Jan. 27	Week 9 Feb. 3	Week 10 Feb. 10	Week 11 Feb. 17	Week 12 Feb. 24	Week 13 Mar. 3	Week 14 Mar. 10	Final Mar. 21	
1.	La Salle (6–0)	La Salle (8–0)	Kansas State (6–1)	Kansas State (7–1)	Kansas State (8–1)	Seton Hall (18–0)	Seton Hall (19–0)	Seton Hall (21–0)	Seton Hall (22–0)	Seton Hall (24–0)	Seton Hall (26–0)	Indiana (17–2)	Indiana (19–3)	Indiana (23–3) (128)	1.
2.	Kansas State (3–0)	Illinois (3–0)	Seton Hall (9–0)	Seton Hall (13–0)	Seton Hall (15–0)	Indiana (8–2)	Indiana (9–2)	Indiana (10–2)	Indiana (12–2)	Indiana (13–2)	Indiana (16–2)	La Salle (24–2)	Washington (27–2)	Seton Hall (31–2) (27)	2.
3.	Illinois (2–0)	Seton Hall (9–0)	La Salle (9–1)	La Salle (11–1)	La Salle (13–1)	Washington (13–1)	Washington (15–1)	Washington (18–1)	Washington (20–1)	Washington (22–1)	Washington (24–1)	Seton Hall (27–1)	La Salle (24–2)	Kansas (19–6)	3.
4.	Seton Hall (6–0)	Holy Cross (4–0)	Illinois (4–1)	Illinois (5–1)	Illinois (8–1)	Kansas State (8–2)	La Salle (15–2)	La Salle (16–2)	La Salle (18–2)	La Salle (20–2)	La Salle (22–2)	Washington (25–2)	Seton Hall (28–2)	Washington (29–3)	4.
5.	Oklahoma A&M (4–0)	Kansas State (4–1)	Washington (7–1)	Oklahoma State (10–1)	Washington (11–1)	La Salle (14–2)	Kansas State (9–2)	Kansas State (10–2)	Illinois (12–2)	Illinois (13–2)	Kansas (13–5)	LSU (20–1)	Kansas (16–5)	LSU (22–3)	5.
6.	NC State (5–1)	NC State (7–1)	Holy Cross (5–0)	Washington (9–1)	Indiana (7–2)	Illinois (8–2)	Illinois (9–2)	Illinois (9–2)	Oklahoma A&M (16–3)	LSU (17–1)	LSU (19–1)	Kansas (13–5)	Oklahoma A&M (22–6)	La Salle (25–3)	6.
7.	Notre Dame (3–0)	Washington (3–1)	Oklahoma A&M (9–1)	Indiana (5–2)	Fordham (11–0)	Oklahoma A&M (12–2)	Fordham (13–2)	DePaul (15–4)	DePaul (17–4)	Oklahoma A&M (17–4)	Oklahoma A&M (19–5)	Oklahoma A&M (19–6)	LSU (20–1)	St. John's (17–6)	7.
8.	Holy Cross (2–0)	LSU (5–0)	Tulsa (7–1)	Fordham (9–0)	NC State (14–2)	NC State (16–2)	Oklahoma A&M (12–3)	Western Kentucky (16–3)	LSU (15–1)	Kansas State (12–3)	Western Kentucky (22–5)	Kansas State (15–4)	Kansas State (16–4)	Oklahoma A&M (23–7)	8.
9.	Washington (3–1)	Oklahoma A&M (6–1)	Minnesota (4–0)	NC State (12–2)	Oklahoma A&M (10–2)	Kansas (9–3)	Western Kentucky (15–3)	Oklahoma A&M (14–3)	Western Kentucky (20–3)	Western Kentucky (20–4)	Kansas State (13–4)	Western Kentucky (22–5)	Western Kentucky (24–5)	Duquesne (21–8)	9.
10.	LSU (4–0)	Western Kentucky (5–1)	Western Kentucky (5–2)	Western Kentucky (9–2)	Western Kentucky (11–2)	Fordham (12–1)	DePaul (14–4)	LSU (14–1)	Kansas State (11–3)	Kansas (12–4)	Illinois (15–3)	Illinois (15–4)	Oklahoma City (18–4)	Notre Dame (19–5)	10.
11.	Western Kentucky (3–0)	Notre Dame (5–1)	NC State (9–2)	LSU (7–1)	Notre Dame (9–1)	Tulsa (12–2)	LSU (13–1)	Seattle (15–2)	Seattle (19–2)	Seattle (20–3)	Oklahoma City (15–4)	Oklahoma City (17–4)	Duquesne (19–7)	Illinois (18–4)	11.
12.	UCLA (3–1)	St. Bonaventure (5–0)	Indiana (3–2)	USC (10–0)	USC (11–1)	Western Kentucky (12–3)	NC State (16–3)	North Carolina (15–3)	NC State (19–4)	Oklahoma City (14–3)	Miami (OH) (16–3)	NC State (25–5)	Wake Forest (23–6)	Kansas State (17–4)	12.
13.	Oklahoma City (4–2)	Navy (6–0)	Seattle (8–2)	Notre Dame (8–1)	Tulsa (11–2)	Seattle (13–2)	Seattle (15–2)	Fordham (14–2)	Oklahoma City (13–3)	Manhattan (16–2)	NC State (22–5)	Notre Dame (17–4)	Illinois (18–4)	Holy Cross (20–6)	13.
14.	St. Bonaventure (4–0)	Tulsa (5–0)	DePaul (8–2)	Holy Cross (5–3)	LSU (10–1)	California (9–5)	Kansas (9–4)	California (11–5)	Kansas (10–4)	DePaul (17–6)	Seattle (22–3)	Louisville (20–5)	Louisville (22–6)	Seattle (29–4)	14.
15.	Tulsa (3–0)	Indiana (3–2)	St. Bonaventure (5–1)	Navy (6–0)	Kansas (8–3)	LSU (11–1)	Eastern Kentucky (11–3)	NC State (17–4)	Manhattan (14–2)	NC State (20–5)	DePaul (19–6)	Seattle (26–3)	Seattle (27–3)	Wake Forest (22–7)	15.
16.	Minnesota (3–0)	Seattle (2–2)	Oklahoma City (7–0)	Seattle (9–1)	Seattle (11–2)	Notre Dame (10–2)	Navy (9–2)	Oklahoma City (11–3)	Fordham (15–3)	Louisville (18–4)	Manhattan (18–2)	Miami (OH) (17–4)	Wyoming (23–8)	Santa Clara (20–7)	16.
17.	Saint Louis (1–1)	Minnesota (3–0)	LSU (61–)	Tulsa (9–2)	Holy Cross (7–3)	Oklahoma City (11–2)	Notre Dame (11–2)	Holy Cross (8–4)	Louisville (16–3)	Murray State (17–5)	Notre Dame (16–4)	Eastern Kentucky (16–8)	Notre Dame (17–4)	Western Kentucky (25–6)	17.
18.	California (4–0)	Colorado (4–0)	Toledo (5–0)	Idaho (8–4)	Oklahoma City (10–1)	Eastern Kentucky (9–2)	North Carolina (13–3)	Kansas (9–4)	Niagara (17–3)	Duke (15–6)	Louisville (20–4)	Duquesne (18–7)	NC State (26–6)	NC State (26–6)	18.
19.	Indiana (1–2)	Oklahoma City (6–0)	Notre Dame (5–1)	Minnesota (5–2)	UCLA (8–5)	Minnesota (7–4)	Manhattan (10–2)	Manhattan (12–2)	California (12–6)	California (13–7)	Duquesne (15–7)	Navy (16–4)	Navy (16–4)	DePaul (19–9)	19.
20.	Navy (4–0) т Kansas (1–1) т	Idaho (4–1) т UCLA (4–2) т	Wayne State (7–0)	California (6–4)	Georgetown (6–1)	Manhattan (8–2)	Tulsa (13–4)	Niagara (15–2)	Tulsa (14–5)	Villanova (13–7)	Eastern Kentucky (15–6)	Holy Cross (18–5)	Manhattan (20–4) т St. John's (15–5) т	SW Missouri State (21–4)	20.
	Week 2 Dec. 16	Week 3 Dec. 23	Week 4 Dec. 30	Week 5 Jan. 6	Week 6 Jan. 13	Week 7 Jan. 20	Week 8 Jan. 27	Week 9 Feb. 3	Week 10 Feb. 10	Week 11 Feb. 17	Week 12 Feb. 24	Week 13 Mar. 3	Week 14 Mar. 10	Final Mar. 21	
		Dropped: Saint Louis (2–1); California; Kansas	Dropped: Navy (6–0); Colorado; Idaho; UCLA (7–2)	Dropped: DePaul; St. Bonaventure; Oklahoma City; Toledo; Wayne State	Dropped: Navy; Idaho; Minnesota (6–3); California (7–5)	Dropped: USC (11–3); Holy Cross (7–4); UCLA (10–5); Georgetown	Dropped: California (9–5); Oklahoma City; Minnesota (8–4)	Dropped: Eastern Kentucky; Navy; Notre Dame (11–3); Tulsa	Dropped: North Carolina; Holy Cross	Dropped: Fordham; Niagara; Tulsa	Dropped: Murray State; Duke; California; Villanova	Dropped: DePaul (19–7); Manhattan (18–4)	Dropped: Miami (OH); Eastern Kentucky; Holy Cross	Dropped: Oklahoma City; Louisville; Wyoming; Navy; Manhattan	

== UP Poll ==
	Preseason	Week 1 Dec. 9	Week 2 Dec. 16	Week 3 Dec. 23	Week 4 Dec. 30	Week 5 Jan. 6	Week 6 Jan. 13	Week 7 Jan. 20	Week 8 Jan. 27	Week 9 Feb. 3	Week 10 Feb. 10	Week 11 Feb. 17	Week 12 Feb. 24	Final Mar. 3	
1.	Illinois	Illinois (0–0)	Illinois (2–0)	Illinois (3–0)	Illinois (4–1)	Illinois (5–1)	Kansas State (8–1)	Seton Hall (18–0)	Seton Hall (19–0)	Seton Hall (21–0)	Indiana (12–2)	Indiana (13–2)	Indiana (16–2)	Indiana (17–2)	1.
2.	Kansas State	La Salle (2–0)	La Salle (6–0)	La Salle (8–0)	La Salle (9–1)	Kansas State (7–1)	Illinois (8–1)	Indiana (8–2)	Indiana (9–2)	Indiana (10–2)	Seton Hall (22–0)	Seton Hall (24–0)	Seton Hall (26–0)	Seton Hall (27–1)	2.
3.	La Salle	Kansas State (1–0)	Kansas State (3–0)	Kansas State (4–1)	Kansas State (6–1)	La Salle (11–1)	La Salle (13–1)	Washington (13–1)	Washington (15–1)	Washington (18–1)	Washington (20–1)	Washington (22–1)	Washington (24–1)	Washington (25–2)	3.
4.	Washington	Washington (2–0)	Washington (3–1)	Washington (3–1)	Washington (7–1)	Washington (9–1)	Washington (11–1)	Kansas State (8–2)	Kansas State (9–2)	Illinois (9–2)	Illinois (12–2)	Illinois (13–2)	La Salle (22–2)	La Salle (24–2)	4.
5.	NC State	Oklahoma A&M (3–0)	Oklahoma A&M (4–0)	Seton Hall (9–0)	Seton Hall (9–0)	Seton Hall (13–0)	Seton Hall (15–0)	Illinois (8–2)	Illinois (9–2)	Kansas State (10–2)	La Salle (18–2)	La Salle (20–2)	Kansas (13–5)	Kansas (13–5)	5.
6.	Oklahoma A&M	NC State (3–0)	Seton Hall (6–0)	NC State (7–1)	Minnesota (4–0)	Oklahoma A&M (10–1)	Indiana (7–2)	La Salle (14–2)	La Salle (15–2)	La Salle (16–2)	Oklahoma A&M (16–3)	Kansas State (12–3)	Illinois (15–3)	LSU (20–1)	6.
7.	UCLA	UCLA (2–0)	UCLA (3–1)	Oklahoma A&M (6–1)	Oklahoma A&M (9–1)	NC State (12–2)	NC State (14–2)	Oklahoma A&M (12–2)	Oklahoma A&M (12–3)	Oklahoma A&M (14–3)	Kansas State (11–3)	Oklahoma A&M (17–4)	LSU (19–1)	Oklahoma A&M (19–6)	7.
8.	Indiana	Seton Hall (3–0)	NC State (5–1)	Holy Cross (4–0)	Indiana (3–2)	Indiana (5–2)	Oklahoma A&M (10–2)	NC State (16–2)	NC State (16–3)	DePaul (15–4)	DePaul (17–4)	LSU (17–1)	Oklahoma A&M (19–5)	NC State (25–5)	8.
9.	Seton Hall	Minnesota (1–0)	Minnesota (3–0)	Minnesota (3–0)	NC State (9–2)	Minnesota (5–2)	Notre Dame (9–1)	Kansas (9–3)	Notre Dame (11–2)	NC State (17–4)	NC State (19–4)	Kansas (12–4)	NC State (22–5)	Kansas State (15–4)	9.
10.	Saint Louis	Holy Cross (0–0)	Notre Dame (3–0)	Indiana (3–2)	Holy Cross (5–0)	LSU (7–1) т	USC (11–1)	Notre Dame (10–2)	Kansas (9–4)	LSU (14–1)	LSU (15–1)	DePaul (17–6)	Kansas State (13–4)	Illinois (15–4)	10.
11.	Holy Cross	Notre Dame (2–0)	Holy Cross (2–0)	Colorado (4–0)	UCLA (7–2)	Notre Dame (8–1) т	LSU (10–1)	LSU (11–1)	DePaul (14–4)	California (11–5)	Kansas (10–4)	NC State (20–5)	DePaul (19–6)	Western Kentucky (22–5)	11.
12.	Santa Clara	Ohio State (1–0)	Indiana (1–2)	Notre Dame (5–1)	Tulsa (7–1)	California (6–4)	Fordham (11–0)	California (9–5)	LSU (13–1)	Fordham (14–2)	Western Kentucky (20–3)	California (13–7)	Western Kentucky (22–5)	California (16–8)	12.
13.	Notre Dame	St. Bonaventure (3–0)	LSU (4–0)	LSU (5–0)	Notre Dame (5–1)	Holy Cross (5–3)	BYU (13–3)	Fordham (12–1)	Fordham (13–2)	Kansas (9–4)	California (12–6)	BYU (19–5)	BYU (20–5)	Notre Dame (17–4)	13.
14.	Duquesne	Indiana (1–1)	Saint Louis (1–1)	UCLA (4–2)	St. Bonaventure (5–1)	Fordham (9–0)	Minnesota (6–3)	Tulsa (12–2)	California (9–5)	Notre Dame (11–3)	Notre Dame (12–3)	Western Kentucky (20–4)	California (14–8)	DePaul (19–7) т	14.
15.	Wyoming	LSU (2–0)	Navy (4–0)	St. Bonaventure (5–0)	DePaul (8–2)	BYU (11–3)	Western Kentucky (11–2)	Holy Cross (7–4)	BYU (15–4)	Western Kentucky (16–3)	BYU (18–5)	Saint Louis (12–8)	Notre Dame (16–4)	Wyoming (19–8) т	15.
16.	St. John's	Saint Louis (0–1)	California (4–0)	Navy (6–0) т	Navy (6–0)	Western Kentucky (9–2)	Holy Cross (7–3)	Saint Louis (6–7)	Saint Louis (7–7)	North Carolina (15–3) т	UCLA (13–5)	Notre Dame (14–4)	Saint Louis (13–10)	Saint Louis (15–10)	16.
17.	BYU т	BYU (4–0)	St. Bonaventure (4–0) т	Saint Louis (2–1) т	Michigan State (3–1)	USC (10–0)	Tulsa (11–2)	USC (11–3)	North Carolina (13–3)	BYU (17–4) т	Minnesota (11–5)	Duke (15–6) т	Manhattan (18–2)	Holy Cross (18–5)	17.
18.	Minnesota т	NYU (4–0) т	BYU (5–0) т	Michigan State (2–1) т	BYU (8–2)	Saint Louis (4–5)	California (7–5)	Western Kentucky (12–3) т	USC (11–3)	Holy Cross (8–4)	Saint Louis (10–8)	Duquesne (15–7) т	Duquesne (15–7)	Oklahoma City (17–4)	18.
19.	Kansas	Santa Clara (2–0) т	DePaul (5–0)	Missouri (3–1) т	Fordham (7–0)	Navy (6–0)	UCLA (8–5)	Minnesota (7–4) т	Minnesota (8–4)	Minnesota (9–5)	Tulsa (14–5) т	UCLA (14–6) т	Seattle (22–3)	BYU (20–7)	19.
20.	St. Bonaventure	St. John's (1–0) т	Missouri (1–0) т NYU (5–0) т	Vanderbilt (3–1)	LSU (6–1) т Saint Louis (2–4) т	UCLA (7–4)	Michigan State (5–3)	DePaul (12–4) т UCLA (10–5) т	Holy Cross (7–4)	Oklahoma (6–5) т Saint Louis (8–8) т	Wyoming (15–6) т	Oklahoma City (14–3)	USC (15–5)	Duquesne (18–7)	20.
	Preseason	Week 1 Dec. 9	Week 2 Dec. 16	Week 3 Dec. 23	Week 4 Dec. 30	Week 5 Jan. 6	Week 6 Jan. 13	Week 7 Jan. 20	Week 8 Jan. 27	Week 9 Feb. 3	Week 10 Feb. 10	Week 11 Feb. 17	Week 12 Feb. 24	Final Mar. 3	
		Dropped: Duquesne; Wyoming; Kansas	Dropped: Ohio State; Santa Clara; St. John's	Dropped: California; BYU; DePaul; NYU	Dropped: Colorado; Missouri; Vanderbilt	Dropped: Tulsa; St. Bonaventure; DePaul; Michigan State	Dropped: Navy; Saint Louis	Dropped: BYU; Michigan State	Dropped: Tulsa; Western Kentucky; UCLA	Dropped: USC	Dropped: Fordham; North Carolina; Holy Cross; Oklahoma	Dropped: Minnesota; Tulsa; Wyoming	Dropped: Duke; UCLA; Oklahoma City	Dropped: Manhattan; Seattle; USC	
