= 1956 NBA Finals =

1956 basketball championship series

Team	Coach	Wins
Philadelphia Warriors	George Senesky	4
Fort Wayne Pistons	Charles Eckman	1
- Dates: March 31 – April 7
- Hall of Famers: Pistons: Chuck Cooper (2019); George Yardley (1996); Warriors: Paul Arizin (1978); Tom Gola (1976); Neil Johnston (1990); Officials: Mendy Rudolph (2007)
- Eastern finals: Warriors defeated Nationals, 3–2
- Western finals: Pistons defeated Hawks, 3–2

The 1956 NBA World Championship Series was the championship series played at the conclusion of the 1955–56 National Basketball Association (NBA) season. The Philadelphia Warriors defeated the Fort Wayne Pistons four games to one. The series is notable for being one of only two Finals in which the two teams alternated home games, the other being in 1971.

== Series summary ==
Game	Date	Home team	Result	Road team
Game 1	March 31	Philadelphia Warriors	99–94 (1–0)	Fort Wayne Pistons
Game 2	April 1	Fort Wayne Pistons	84–83 (1–1)	Philadelphia Warriors
Game 3	April 3	Philadelphia Warriors	100–96 (2–1)	Fort Wayne Pistons
Game 4	April 5	Fort Wayne Pistons	105–107 (1–3)	Philadelphia Warriors
Game 5	April 7	Philadelphia Warriors	99–88 (4–1)	Fort Wayne Pistons

Warriors win series 4–1

== Team rosters ==
=== Philadelphia Warriors ===
1955–56 Philadelphia Warriors roster
Players

Pos.	No.	Player	Height	Weight	DOB	From
F	11	Paul Arizin	6 ft 4 in (1.93 m)	190 lb (86 kg)		Villanova
G	7	Ernie Beck	6 ft 4 in (1.93 m)	190 lb (86 kg)		Penn
F/C	12	Walt Davis	6 ft 8 in (2.03 m)	205 lb (93 kg)		Texas A&M
G	5	George Dempsey	6 ft 2 in (1.88 m)	190 lb (86 kg)		King's (NY)
G	17	Jack George	6 ft 2 in (1.88 m)	190 lb (86 kg)		La Salle
G/F	15	Tom Gola	6 ft 6 in (1.98 m)	205 lb (93 kg)		La Salle
F/C	9	Joe Graboski	6 ft 7 in (2.01 m)	195 lb (88 kg)		Tuley HS (IL)
G	4	Larry Hennessy	6 ft 3 in (1.91 m)	185 lb (84 kg)		Villanova
C	6	Neil Johnston	6 ft 8 in (2.03 m)	210 lb (95 kg)		Ohio State
F	14	Jackie Moore	6 ft 5 in (1.96 m)	180 lb (82 kg)		La Salle
G	25	Bob Schafer	6 ft 3 in (1.91 m)	195 lb (88 kg)		Villanova

Coaches
Head coach
- George Senesky

Legend
- (DP) Unsigned draft pick
- (FA) Free agent
- (S) Suspended
- Injured

=== Fort Wayne Pistons ===
1955–56 Ft. Wayne Pistons roster
Players

Pos.	No.	Player	Height	Weight	DOB	From
PG	7	Frankie Brian	6 ft 1 in (1.85 m)	180 lb (82 kg)	May 1, 1923	LSU
SF	6	Chuck Cooper	6 ft 5 in (1.96 m)	210 lb (95 kg)	September 29, 1926	Duquesne
SG	7, 8	Corky Devlin	6 ft 5 in (1.96 m)	195 lb (88 kg)	December 21, 1931	George Washington
C	16	Larry Foust	6 ft 9 in (2.06 m)	215 lb (98 kg)	June 24, 1928	La Salle
C	17	Bob Houbregs	6 ft 8 in (2.03 m)	225 lb (102 kg)	March 12, 1932	Washington
PF	9	Mel Hutchins	6 ft 6 in (1.98 m)	200 lb (91 kg)	November 22, 1928	BYU
SG	5	Chuck Noble	6 ft 4 in (1.93 m)	190 lb (86 kg)	July 24, 1931	Louisville
PG	14	Andy Phillip	6 ft 2 in (1.88 m)	195 lb (88 kg)	March 7, 1922	Illinois
SF	8, 15	Odie Spears	6 ft 5 in (1.96 m)	205 lb (93 kg)	June 17, 1924	Western Kentucky
SF	12	George Yardley	6 ft 5 in (1.96 m)	190 lb (86 kg)	November 3, 1928	Stanford

Coaches
Head coach

Charles Eckman

Legend
- (DP) Unsigned draft pick
- (FA) Free agent
- (S) Suspended
- Injured

Roster

== Box scores ==
March 31

Boxscore

Fort Wayne Pistons 94, Philadelphia Warriors 98
Scoring by quarter: 25–20, 24–20, 15–33, 30–25
Pts: George Yardley 27; Rebs: George Yardley 15; Asts: Hutchins, Phillip 6 each	Pts: Paul Arizin 28; Rebs: Neil Johnston 14; Asts: Tom Gola 10
Philadelphia leads series, 1–0

Philadelphia Civic Center, Philadelphia, Pennsylvania
Attendance: 4,128

April 1

Boxscore

Philadelphia Warriors 83, Fort Wayne Pistons 84
Scoring by quarter: 20–20, 26–22, 19–23, 18–19
Pts: Paul Arizin 27; Rebs: Arizin, Johnston 9 each Asts: Ernie Beck 6	Pts: George Yardley 30; Rebs: George Yardley 19; Asts: Andy Phillip 5
Series tied, 1–1

War Memorial Coliseum, Fort Wayne, Indiana
Attendance: 6,976

April 3

Boxscore

Fort Wayne Pistons 96, Philadelphia Warriors 100
Scoring by quarter: 26–25, 25–23, 14–25, 31–27
Pts: Larry Foust 19; Rebs: Larry Foust 14; Asts: Chuck Noble 4	Pts: Paul Arizin 27; Rebs: Neil Johnston 17; Asts: Tom Gola 8
Philadelphia leads series, 2–1

Philadelphia Civic Center, Philadelphia, Pennsylvania
Attendance: 11,698

April 5

Boxscore

Philadelphia Warriors 107, Fort Wayne Pistons 105
Scoring by quarter: 24–24, 26–32, 30–26, 27–23
Pts: Paul Arizin 30; Rebs: Tom Gola 9 Asts: Joe Graboski 7	Pts: George Yardley 21; Rebs: Larry Foust 14; Asts: Andy Phillip 6
Philadelphia leads series, 3–1

War Memorial Coliseum, Fort Wayne, Indiana
Attendance: 7,852

April 7

Boxscore

Fort Wayne Pistons 88, Philadelphia Warriors 99
Scoring by quarter: 24–22, 19–22, 20–28, 25–27
Pts: George Yardley 30; Rebs: George Yardley 20; Asts: Corky Devlin 6	Pts: Joe Graboski 29; Rebs: Joe Graboski 16; Asts: Jack George 10
Philadelphia wins series, 4–1

Philadelphia Civic Center, Philadelphia, Pennsylvania
Attendance: 11,194

== See also ==
- 1956 NBA playoffs
