= List of Detroit Pistons seasons =

This is a list of seasons completed by the Detroit Pistons of the National Basketball Association. The franchise was founded in 1937 as a semi-professional company basketball team known as the Fort Wayne Zollner Pistons before they joined in the National Basketball League in 1941. In 1948, the franchise joined the Basketball Association of America as the Fort Wayne Pistons, which was the precursor to the NBA. However, the games won and lost in the NBL are not included in the franchise total.

The Pistons have had three main periods of success. In the early years of the NBA, the franchise reached the NBA Finals twice in consecutive years before falling to the Syracuse Nationals and the Philadelphia Warriors. Following an extended era of mediocrity the Pistons, led by the Hall of Fame backcourt of Isiah Thomas and Joe Dumars and nicknamed the "Bad Boys" for their intimidating defense, posted winning records every seasons from 1983–84 to 1991–92, and after narrowly losing in 1988, ended the Los Angeles Lakers' dynasty of the 1980s the following season and repeated as NBA champions the following year. The Pistons' third period of success, with former on-court star Dumars serving as general manager and building a top team from other franchises' discards, occurred between 2001–02 and 2007–08 when the team won fifty games or more during every season, including a third NBA title in 2003–04 and a franchise record total of wins two seasons later.

The Pistons have experienced two major periods of failure. Between 1956–57 and 1982–83, the Pistons had just three winning seasons and overall had a winning percentage of .417, culminating in a combined record of 37–127 (win percent .226) in the 1979–80 and 1980–81 seasons, after which the drafting of Thomas completely revitalized the franchise. Between 2009–10 and 2023-2024, the Pistons had only two seasons with at least a .500 winning percentage and made the postseason only two times, both times as an 8th seed who were swept (both sweeps were part of a larger NBA record 15 game playoff losing streak as well as an NBA record 11 game playoff home game losing streak between 2008-2025 (in the case of the overall playoff losing steak) and 2026 (in the case of the home playoff losing streak).

== Seasons ==
NBL champions	NBA champions	Conference champions	Division champions	Playoff berth

Season	Team	Conference	Finish	Division	Finish	Wins	Losses	Win%	GB	Playoffs	Awards	Head coach
Fort Wayne Zollner Pistons (NBL)
—	1941–42	—	—	—	2nd	15	9	.625	5	Won NBL Semifinals (Goodyear Wingfoots) 2–1; Lost NBL Championship (All-Stars) 2–1		Carl Bennett
—	1942–43	—	—	—	1st	17	6	.739	—	Won NBL Semifinals (Studebaker Flyers) 2–1; Lost NBL Championship (Red Skins) 2–1	Bobby McDermott (MVP)	Carl Bennett
—	1943–44	—	—	—	1st	18	4	.818	—	Won NBL Semifinals (Chase Brassmen) 2–0; Won NBL Championship (Red Skins) 3–0	Bobby McDermott (MVP, COY)	Bobby McDermott
—	1944–45	—	—	Eastern	1st	25	5	.833	—	Won Division semifinals (Allmen Transfers) 2–0; Won NBL Championship (Red Skins) 3–2	Bobby McDermott (MVP, COY)	Bobby McDermott
—	1945–46	—	—	Eastern	1st	26	8	.765	—	Lost Division semifinals (Royals) 3–1	Bobby McDermott (MVP)	Carl Bennett
—	1946–47	—	—	Eastern	2nd	25	19	.568	6	Won Opening Round (Jeeps) 3–2; Lost Division semifinals (Royals) 2–1		Bobby McDermott; Carl Bennett; Curly Armstrong
—	1947–48	—	—	Eastern	3rd	40	20	.667	4	Lost Opening Round (Royals) 3–1		Carl Bennett
Fort Wayne Pistons
1948–49	1948–49	—	—	Western	5th	22	38	.367	23			Carl Bennett; Curly Armstrong
1949–50	1949–50	—	—	Central	4th	40	28	.588	11	Won Division semifinals (Royals) 2–0; Lost Division finals (Lakers) 2–0		Murray Mendenhall
1950–51	1950–51	—	—	Western	3rd	32	36	.471	12	Lost Division semifinals (Royals) 2–1		Murray Mendenhall
1951–52	1951–52	—	—	Western	4th	29	37	.439	12	Lost Division semifinals (Royals) 2–0		Paul Birch
1952–53	1952–53	—	—	Western	3rd	36	33	.522	11.5	Won Division semifinals (Royals) 2–1; Lost Division finals (Lakers) 3–2	Don Meineke (ROY)	Paul Birch
1953–54	1953–54	—	—	Western	3rd	40	32	.556	6	Lost Round-Robin (Royals) 2–0; Lost Round-Robin (Lakers) 2–0		Paul Birch
1954–55	1954–55	—	—	Western	1st	43	29	.597	—	Won Division finals (Lakers) 3–1; Lost NBA Finals (Nationals) 4–3		Charley Eckman
1955–56	1955–56	—	—	Western	1st	37	35	.514	—	Won Division finals (Hawks) 3–2; Lost NBA Finals (Warriors) 4–1		Charley Eckman
1956–57	1956–57	—	—	Western	3rd	34	38	.472	—	Lost Division semifinals (Lakers) 2–0		Charley Eckman
Detroit Pistons
1957–58	1957–58	—	—	Western	2nd	33	39	.458	8	Won Division semifinals (Royals) 2–0; Lost Division finals (Hawks) 4–1		Charley Eckman; Red Rocha
1958–59	1958–59	—	—	Western	3rd	28	44	.389	21	Lost Division semifinals (Lakers) 2–1		Red Rocha
1959–60	1959–60	—	—	Western	2nd	30	45	.400	16	Lost Division semifinals (Lakers) 2–0		Red Rocha; Dick McGuire
1960–61	1960–61	—	—	Western	3rd	34	45	.430	17	Lost Division semifinals (Lakers) 3–2		Dick McGuire
1961–62	1961–62	—	—	Western	3rd	37	43	.463	17	Won Division semifinals (Royals) 3–1; Lost Division finals (Lakers) 4–2		Dick McGuire
1962–63	1962–63	—	—	Western	3rd	34	46	.425	19	Lost Division semifinals (Hawks) 3–1		Dick McGuire
1963–64	1963–64	—	—	Western	5th	23	57	.288	25			Charles Wolf
1964–65	1964–65	—	—	Western	4th	31	49	.388	18			Charles Wolf; Dave DeBusschere
1965–66	1965–66	—	—	Western	5th	22	58	.275	23			Dave DeBusschere
1966–67	1966–67	—	—	Western	5th	30	51	.370	14		Dave Bing (ROY)	Dave DeBusschere; Donnis Butcher
1967–68	1967–68	—	—	Eastern	4th	40	42	.488	22	Lost Division semifinals (Celtics) 4–2		Donnis Butcher
1968–69	1968–69	—	—	Eastern	6th	32	50	.390	25			Donnis Butcher; Paul Seymour
1969–70	1969–70	—	—	Eastern	7th	31	51	.378	29			Butch van Breda Kolff
1970–71	1970–71	Western	6th	Midwest	4th	45	37	.549	21			Butch van Breda Kolff
1971–72	1971–72	Western	8th	Midwest	4th	26	56	.317	37			Butch van Breda Kolff; Terry Dischinger; Earl Lloyd
1972–73	1972–73	Western	5th	Midwest	3rd	40	42	.488	20			Earl Lloyd; Ray Scott
1973–74	1973–74	Western	4th	Midwest	3rd	52	30	.634	7	Lost conference semifinals (Bulls) 4–3	Ray Scott (COY); Bob Lanier (ASG MVP)	Ray Scott
1974–75	1974–75	Western	5th	Midwest	3rd	40	42	.488	7	Lost First round (SuperSonics) 2–1		Ray Scott
1975–76	1975–76	Western	5th	Midwest	2nd	36	46	.439	2	Won First round (Bucks) 2–1; Lost conference semifinals (Warriors) 4–2		Ray Scott; Herb Brown
1976–77	1976–77	Western	5th	Midwest	2nd	44	38	.537	6	Lost First round (Warriors) 2–1		Herb Brown
1977–78	1977–78	Western	9th	Midwest	4th	38	44	.463	10		Bob Lanier (JWKC)	Herb Brown; Bob Kauffman
1978–79	1978–79	Eastern	9th	Central	5th	30	52	.366	18			Dick Vitale
1979–80	1979–80	Eastern	11th	Central	6th	16	66	.195	34			Dick Vitale; Richie Adubato
1980–81	1980–81	Eastern	11th	Central	6th	21	61	.256	39			Scotty Robertson
1981–82	1981–82	Eastern	7th	Central	3rd	39	43	.476	16		Kent Benson (JWKC)	Scotty Robertson
1982–83	1982–83	Eastern	8th	Central	3rd	37	45	.451	14			Scotty Robertson
1983–84	1983–84	Eastern	4th	Central	2nd	49	33	.598	1	Lost First round (Knicks) 3–2	Isiah Thomas (ASG MVP)	Chuck Daly
1984–85	1984–85	Eastern	4th	Central	2nd	46	36	.561	13	Won First round (Nets) 3–0; Lost conference semifinals (Celtics) 4–2		Chuck Daly
1985–86	1985–86	Eastern	5th	Central	3rd	46	36	.561	11	Lost First round (Hawks) 3–1	Isiah Thomas (ASG MVP)	Chuck Daly
1986–87	1986–87	Eastern	3rd	Central	2nd	52	30	.634	5	Won First round (Bullets) 3–0; Won conference semifinals (Hawks) 4–1; Lost conference finals (Celtics) 4–3	Isiah Thomas (JWKC)	Chuck Daly
1987–88	1987–88	Eastern	2nd	Central	1st	54	28	.659	—	Won First round (Bullets) 3–2; Won conference semifinals (Bulls) 4–1; Won conference finals (Celtics) 4–2; Lost NBA Finals (Lakers) 4–3		Chuck Daly
1988–89	1988–89	Eastern	1st	Central	1st	63	19	.768	—	Won First round (Celtics) 3–0; Won conference semifinals (Bucks) 4–0; Won conference finals (Bulls) 4–2; Won NBA Finals (Lakers) 4–0	Joe Dumars (FMVP)	Chuck Daly
1989–90	1989–90	Eastern	1st	Central	1st	59	23	.720	—	Won First round (Pacers) 3–0; Won conference semifinals (Knicks) 4–1; Won conference finals (Bulls) 4–3; Won NBA Finals (Trail Blazers) 4–1	Isiah Thomas (FMVP); Dennis Rodman (DPOY)	Chuck Daly
1990–91	1990–91	Eastern	3rd	Central	2nd	50	32	.610	11	Won First round (Hawks) 3–2; Won conference semifinals (Celtics) 4–2; Lost conference finals (Bulls) 4–0	Dennis Rodman (DPOY)	Chuck Daly
1991–92	1991–92	Eastern	5th	Central	3rd	48	34	.585	19	Lost First round (Knicks) 3–2		Chuck Daly
1992–93	1992–93	Eastern	10th	Central	6th	40	42	.488	17			Ron Rothstein
1993–94	1993–94	Eastern	14th	Central	6th	20	62	.244	37		Joe Dumars (JWKC)	Don Chaney
1994–95	1994–95	Eastern	12th	Central	7th	28	54	.341	24		Grant Hill (ROY)	Don Chaney
1995–96	1995–96	Eastern	7th	Central	5th	46	36	.561	26	Lost First round (Magic) 3–0	Joe Dumars (SPOR)	Doug Collins
1996–97	1996–97	Eastern	5th	Central	4th	54	28	.659	15	Lost First round (Hawks) 3–2		Doug Collins
1997–98	1997–98	Eastern	11th	Central	6th	37	45	.451	25			Doug Collins; Alvin Gentry
1998–99	1998–99	Eastern	5th	Central	3rd	29	21	.580	4	Lost First round (Hawks) 3–2		Alvin Gentry
1999–00	1999–00	Eastern	7th	Central	5th	42	40	.512	14	Lost First round (Heat) 3–0		Alvin Gentry; George Irvine
2000–01	2000–01	Eastern	10th	Central	5th	32	50	.390	20			George Irvine
2001–02	2001–02	Eastern	2nd	Central	1st	50	32	.610	—	Won First round (Raptors) 3–2; Lost conference semifinals (Celtics) 4–1	Ben Wallace (DPOY); Corliss Williamson (SIX); Rick Carlisle (COY)	Rick Carlisle
2002–03	2002–03	Eastern	1st	Central	1st	50	32	.610	—	Won First round (Magic) 4–3; Won conference semifinals (76ers) 4–2; Lost conference finals (Nets) 4–0	Ben Wallace (DPOY); Joe Dumars (EOY)	Rick Carlisle
2003–04	2003–04	Eastern	3rd	Central	2nd	54	28	.659	7	Won First round (Bucks) 4–1; Won conference semifinals (Nets) 4–3; Won conference finals (Pacers) 4–2; Won NBA Finals (Lakers) 4–1	Chauncey Billups (FMVP)	Larry Brown
2004–05	2004–05	Eastern	2nd	Central	1st	54	28	.659	—	Won First round (76ers) 4–1; Won conference semifinals (Pacers) 4–2; Won conference finals (Heat) 4–3; Lost NBA Finals (Spurs) 4–3	Ben Wallace (DPOY)	Larry Brown
2005–06	2005–06	Eastern	1st	Central	1st	64	18	.780	—	Won First round (Bucks) 4–1; Won conference semifinals (Cavaliers) 4–3; Lost conference finals (Heat) 4–2	Ben Wallace (DPOY)	Flip Saunders
2006–07	2006–07	Eastern	1st	Central	1st	53	29	.646	—	Won First round (Magic) 4–0; Won conference semifinals (Bulls) 4–2; Lost conference finals (Cavaliers) 4–2		Flip Saunders
2007–08	2007–08	Eastern	2nd	Central	1st	59	23	.720	—	Won First round (76ers) 4–2; Won conference semifinals (Magic) 4–1; Lost conference finals (Celtics) 4–2	Chauncey Billups (JWKC)	Flip Saunders
2008–09	2008–09	Eastern	8th	Central	3rd	39	43	.476	27	Lost First round (Cavaliers) 4–0		Michael Curry
2009–10	2009–10	Eastern	12th	Central	5th	27	55	.329	34			John Kuester
2010–11	2010–11	Eastern	11th	Central	4th	30	52	.366	32			John Kuester
2011–12	2011–12	Eastern	10th	Central	4th	25	41	.379	25			Lawrence Frank
2012–13	2012–13	Eastern	11th	Central	4th	29	53	.354	20.5			Lawrence Frank
2013–14	2013–14	Eastern	11th	Central	4th	29	53	.354	27			Maurice Cheeks; John Loyer
2014–15	2014–15	Eastern	12th	Central	5th	32	50	.390	21			Stan Van Gundy
2015–16	2015–16	Eastern	8th	Central	3rd	44	38	.537	13	Lost First round (Cavaliers) 4–0		Stan Van Gundy
2016–17	2016–17	Eastern	10th	Central	5th	37	45	.451	14			Stan Van Gundy
2017–18	2017–18	Eastern	9th	Central	4th	39	43	.476	11			Stan Van Gundy
2018–19	2018–19	Eastern	8th	Central	3rd	41	41	.500	19	Lost First round (Bucks) 4–0		Dwane Casey
2019–20	2019–20	Eastern	13th	Central	4th	20	46	.303	32.5			Dwane Casey
2020–21	2020–21	Eastern	15th	Central	5th	20	52	.278	26			Dwane Casey
2021–22	2021–22	Eastern	14th	Central	5th	23	59	.280	30			Dwane Casey
2022–23	2022–23	Eastern	15th	Central	5th	17	65	.207	41			Dwane Casey
2023–24	2023–24	Eastern	15th	Central	5th	14	68	.171	50			Monty Williams
2024–25	2024–25	Eastern	6th	Central	4th	44	38	.537	20	Lost First round (Knicks) 4–2		J. B. Bickerstaff
2025–26	2025–26	Eastern	1st	Central	1st	60	22	.732	—	Won First round (Magic) 4–3; Lost conference semifinals (Cavaliers) 4–3		J. B. Bickerstaff

== All-time records ==
=== NBA records ===
Statistic	Wins	Losses	Win%
Regular season record (1948–present)	2,931	3,231	.476
Post-season record (1948–present)	197	193	.505
All-time regular and post-season record	3,128	3,424	.477

=== NBL records ===
Statistic	Wins	Losses	Win%
Regular season record (1941–1948)	166	71	.700
Post-season record (1941–1948)	22	18	.550
All-time regular and post-season record	188	89	.679
