= 1960 NBA All-Star Game =

Exhibition basketball game

	1	2	3	4	Total
West	26	25	30	34	115
East	25	33	33	34	125
- Date: January 22, 1960
- Arena: Convention Hall
- City: Philadelphia
- MVP: Wilt Chamberlain
- Attendance: 10,421

NBA All-Star Game
< 1959	1961 >

The 10th Annual NBA East-West All-Star Game was played on Friday, January 22, 1960, at the Philadelphia Convention Hall in Philadelphia, home of the Philadelphia Warriors. This was the first NBA All-Star Game held in Philadelphia and the only one hosted by the Philadelphia Warriors, which would move to the San Francisco Bay Area in 1962; consequently, all subsequent All-Star games in Philadelphia have been hosted by the Philadelphia 76ers, which relocated to the city from Syracuse, New York in 1963.

The coaches were the Boston Celtics' Red Auerbach for the East and the St. Louis Hawks' Ed Macauley for the West. Both earned the selections because their respective teams led their divisions prior to the game; this marked the second consecutive year that Auerbach and Macauley served as All-Star Game head coaches. The East won the game 125–115. The hometown team's Wilt Chamberlain, who made his All-Star debut, was named the Most Valuable Player after logging 23 points and 25 rebounds.

== Roster ==
Eastern All-Stars
Pos.	Player	Team	No. of selections
Starters
C	Wilt Chamberlain	Philadelphia Warriors	1st
G	Bob Cousy	Boston Celtics	10th
G	Richie Guerin	New York Knicks	3rd
C	Bill Russell	Boston Celtics	3rd
F	Dolph Schayes	Syracuse Nationals	10th
Reserves
F	Paul Arizin	Philadelphia Warriors	8th
G	Larry Costello	Syracuse Nationals	3rd
G/F	Tom Gola	Philadelphia Warriors	1st
F	Willie Naulls	New York Knicks	2nd
G	Bill Sharman	Boston Celtics	8th
F	George Yardley	Syracuse Nationals	6th
Head coach:Red Auerbach (Boston Celtics)

Western All-Stars
Pos.	Player	Team	No. of selections
Starters
F	Elgin Baylor	Minneapolis Lakers	2nd
C	Walter Dukes	Detroit Pistons	1st
F/C	Bob Pettit	St. Louis Hawks	6th
G	Gene Shue	Detroit Pistons	3rd
F/G	Jack Twyman	Cincinnati Royals	4th
Reserves
G	Dick Garmaker	Minneapolis Lakers	4th
F	Cliff Hagan	St. Louis Hawks	3rd
G	Hot Rod Hundley	Minneapolis Lakers	1st
C	Clyde Lovellette	St. Louis Hawks	3rd
G/F	Chuck Noble	Detroit Pistons	1st
Head coach: Ed Macauley (St. Louis Hawks)

== Eastern Division ==
Player, Team	MIN	FGM	FGA	FTM	FTA	REB	AST	PF	PTS
Wilt Chamberlain, PHW	30	9	20	5	7	25	2	1	23
Dolph Schayes, SYR	27	8	19	3	3	10	0	3	19
Bill Russell, BOS	27	3	7	0	2	8	3	1	6
Bill Sharman, BOS	26	8	21	1	1	6	2	1	17
Willie Naulls, NYK	26	5	19	3	4	10	0	1	13
Bob Cousy, BOS	26	1	7	0	0	5	8	2	2
Richie Guerin, NYK	22	5	11	2	2	4	4	4	12
Tom Gola, PHW	20	5	13	2	3	4	2	3	12
Larry Costello, SYR	20	5	9	0	0	4	2	1	10
George Yardley, SYR	16	5	9	1	2	3	0	4	11
Paul Arizin, PHW (injured)
Totals	240	54	135	17	24	79	23	21	125

== Western Division ==
Player, Team	MIN	FGM	FGA	FTM	FTA	REB	AST	PF	PTS
Gene Shue, DET	34	6	13	1	2	6	6	0	13
Jack Twyman, CIN	28	11	17	5	8	5	1	4	27
Elgin Baylor, MNL	28	10	18	5	7	13	3	4	25
Bob Pettit, STL	28	4	15	3	6	14	2	2	11
Walter Dukes, DET	26	2	10	0	1	15	1	3	4
Dick Garmaker, MNL	23	5	11	1	2	4	3	1	11
Hot Rod Hundley, MNL	23	5	12	0	0	3	2	2	10
Cliff Hagan, STL	21	1	9	0	0	3	2	1	2
Clyde Lovellette, STL	18	6	11	0	0	8	1	1	12
Chuck Noble, DET	11	0	5	0	0	1	3	1	0
Totals	240	50	121	15	26	72	24	19	115

== Score by periods ==
Score by periods:	1	2	3	4	Final
East	25	33	33	34	125
West	26	25	30	34	115

- Halftime— East, 58–51
- Third Quarter— East, 91–81
- Officials: Arnie Heft and Sid Borgia
- Attendance: 10,421
