= 1959 NBA All-Star Game =

Exhibition basketball game

	1	2	3	4	Total
West	27	34	30	33	124
East	31	21	32	24	108
- Date: Friday, January 23, 1959
- Arena: Olympia Stadium
- City: Detroit
- MVP: Elgin Baylor and Bob Pettit
- Attendance: 10,541
- Network: NBC
- Announcers: Curt Gowdy

NBA All-Star Game
< 1958	1960 >

The 9th Annual National Basketball Association All Star Game was an exhibition basketball held on January 23, 1959, at the Olympia Stadium in Detroit, home of the Detroit Pistons. It was the ninth edition of the National Basketball Association (NBA) All-Star Game, held during the 1958–59 NBA season. It was the first and only All-Star Game held in Detroit to date—though the Pistons later hosted the 1979 game in the suburb of Pontiac, Michigan—and the second hosted by the Pistons franchise, following the 1953 game held in Fort Wayne, Indiana, when they were known as the Fort Wayne Pistons.

The coaches were the Boston Celtics' Red Auerbach for the East and the St. Louis Hawks' Ed Macauley for the West, as both teams had led their respective divisions prior to the game. The West won the game 124–108. Elgin Baylor and Bob Pettit were named the Most Valuable Players, marking the first time in league history that two players shared the award in the same game.

== Roster ==
Legend
	Starter		MVP	MIN	Minutes played
FG	Field goals	FGA	Field goal attempts	FT	Free throws	FTA	Free throw attempts
REB	Rebounds	AST	Assists	PF	Personal fouls	PTS	Points

Western All-Stars
Pos.	Player	Team	No. of selections
Starters
F	Elgin Baylor	Minneapolis Lakers	1st
F	Cliff Hagan	St. Louis Hawks	2nd
G	Slater Martin	St. Louis Hawks	7th
F/C	Bob Pettit	St. Louis Hawks	5th
G	Gene Shue	Detroit Pistons	2nd
Reserves
F/C	Larry Foust	Minneapolis Lakers	8th
G	Dick Garmaker	Minneapolis Lakers	3rd
G	Dick McGuire	Detroit Pistons	7th
F/G	Jack Twyman	Cincinnati Royals	3rd
F/G	George Yardley	Detroit Pistons	5th
Head coach: Ed Macauley (St. Louis Hawks)

Eastern All-Stars
Pos.	Player	Team	No. of selections
Starters
F	Paul Arizin	Philadelphia Warriors	7th
G	Bob Cousy	Boston Celtics	9th
C	Bill Russell	Boston Celtics	2nd
F	Kenny Sears	New York Knicks	2nd
G	Bill Sharman	Boston Celtics	7th
Reserves
G	Larry Costello	Syracuse Nationals	2nd
G	Richie Guerin	New York Knicks	2nd
C	Red Kerr	Syracuse Nationals	2nd
F/C	Woody Sauldsberry	Philadelphia Warriors	1st
F/C	Dolph Schayes	Syracuse Nationals	9th
Head coach:Red Auerbach (Boston Celtics)

== Western Division ==
Head Coach: Ed Macauley, St. Louis Hawks

Player	Team	MIN	FG	FGA	FT	FTA	REB	AST	PF	PTS
Bob Pettit	St. Louis Hawks	34	8	21	9	9	16	5	1	25
Elgin Baylor	Minneapolis Lakers	32	10	20	4	5	11	1	3	24
Gene Shue	Detroit Pistons	31	6	11	1	2	4	3	4	13
Cliff Hagan	St. Louis Hawks	22	6	12	3	3	8	3	5	15
Slater Martin	St. Louis Hawks	22	2	6	1	2	6	1	2	5
Dick McGuire	Detroit Pistons	24	2	7	1	2	3	3	2	5
Jack Twyman	Cincinnati Royals	23	8	12	2	4	8	3	4	18
Dick Garmaker	Minneapolis Lakers	19	2	6	1	1	2	1	2	5
George Yardley	Detroit Pistons	17	2	8	2	2	4	0	3	6
Larry Foust	Minneapolis Lakers	16	3	9	2	2	9	0	3	8
Totals		240	49	112	26	32	71	20	29	124

== Eastern Division ==
Head Coach: Red Auerbach, Boston Celtics

Player	Team	MIN	FG	FGA	FT	FTA	REB	AST	PF	PTS
Bob Cousy	Boston Celtics	32	4	8	5	6	5	4	0	13
Paul Arizin	Philadelphia Warriors	30	4	15	8	9	8	0	2	16
Bill Russell	Boston Celtics	27	3	10	1	1	9	1	4	7
Kenny Sears	New York Knicks	26	5	9	5	5	8	1	4	15
Bill Sharman	Boston Celtics	24	3	12	5	6	2	0	1	11
Dolph Schayes	Syracuse Nationals	22	3	11	7	8	13	1	6	13
Richie Guerin	New York Knicks	22	1	7	3	5	3	3	1	5
Red Kerr	Syracuse Nationals	21	3	14	1	2	9	2	0	7
Woody Sauldsberry	Philadelphia Warriors	18	5	11	4	4	2	3	2	14
Larry Costello	Syracuse Nationals	18	3	8	1	1	3	3	1	7
Totals		240	34	105	40	47	62	18	21	108
