= Al Ferrari =

American basketball player

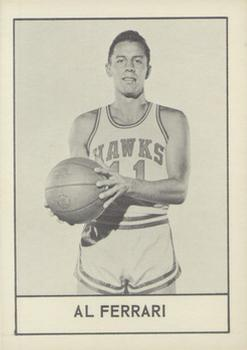

Personal information
- Born: July 6, 1933 New York, New York, U.S.
- Died: May 2, 2016 (aged 82) St. Louis, Missouri, U.S.
- Listed height: 6 ft 4 in (1.93 m)
- Listed weight: 190 lb (86 kg)

Career information
- High school: Brooklyn Technical (Brooklyn, New York)
- College: Michigan State (1952–1955)
- NBA draft: 1955: 3rd round, 15th overall pick
- Drafted by: St. Louis Hawks
- Playing career: 1955–1963
- Position: Guard / small forward
- Number: 22, 26, 11

Career history
- 1955–1962: St. Louis Hawks
- 1962–1963: Chicago Zephyrs

Career NBA statistics
- Points: 2,525 (6.8 ppg)
- Rebounds: 830 (2.2 rpg)
- Assists: 943 (2.5 apg)
- Stats at NBA.com
- Stats at Basketball Reference

Albert R. Ferrari (July 6, 1933 – May 2, 2016) was an American basketball player. At 6'4", and weighing 190 lbs, he played both at guard and forward. Born in New York City, he went to high school at Brooklyn Technical High School and after he attended college at Michigan State University. He was drafted by the St. Louis Hawks in the 3rd round (1st pick) of the 1955 NBA draft. In his six-season NBA career, he played for the Hawks and the Chicago Zephyrs.

For the 1957–58 NBA season he was not on the team's roster due to a commitment to military service.

Ferrari was an avid golfer, and consistently donated his time for the Whitey Herzog Youth Foundation Golf Scramble. He died on May 2, 2016, in St. Louis, Missouri, at the age of 82.

== Career statistics ==
Legend
GP	Games played	GS	Games started	MPG	Minutes per game
FG%	Field goal percentage	3P%	3-point field goal percentage	FT%	Free throw percentage
RPG	Rebounds per game	APG	Assists per game	SPG	Steals per game
BPG	Blocks per game	PPG	Points per game	**Bold**	Career high
*	Led the league

=== NBA ===
==== Regular season ====
Year	Team	GP	MPG	FG%	FT%	RPG	APG	PPG
1955–56	St. Louis	68	23.7	.358	.695	**2.7**	2.4	8.0
1958–59	St. Louis	72*	16.5	.348	.729	2.0	1.7	5.7
1959–60	St. Louis	71	22.1	**.413**	.782	2.3	2.6	**8.6**
1960–61	St. Louis	63	16.4	.357	.819	1.8	2.3	5.2
1961–62	St. Louis	**79**	**25.9**	.357	.799	**2.7**	**4.0**	7.5
1962–63	Chicago	18	7.7	,.324	**.824**	.7	.8	2.4
Career		371	20.4	.368	.760	2.2	2.5	6.8

==== Playoffs ====
Year	Team	GP	MPG	FG%	FT%	RPG	APG	PPG
1956	St. Louis	8	**33.0**	.376	.771	**4.1**	**3.0**	**14.8**
1959	St. Louis	6	28.8	.350	**.800**	2.5	2.5	8.0
1960	St. Louis	9	15.8	.395	.556	1.0	1.7	4.4
1961	St. Louis	**10**	15.7	**.455**	.588	2.2	2.1	5.0
Career		33	22.3	.391	.723	2.4	2.3	7.8
