= Larry Foust =

American basketball player (1928–1984)

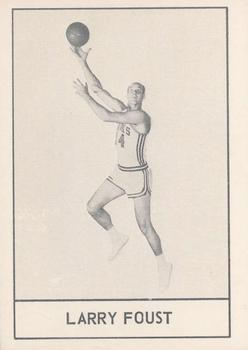

Personal information
- Born: June 24, 1928 Painesville, Ohio, U.S.
- Died: October 27, 1984 (aged 56) Pittsburgh, Pennsylvania, U.S.
- Listed height: 6 ft 9 in (2.06 m)
- Listed weight: 215 lb (98 kg)

Career information
- High school: South Catholic (Philadelphia, Pennsylvania)
- College: La Salle (1946–1950)
- NBA draft: 1950: 1st round, 5th overall pick
- Drafted by: Chicago Stags
- Playing career: 1950–1962
- Position: Power forward / center
- Number: 16, 14, 13

Career history
- 1950–1957: Fort Wayne Pistons
- 1957–1960: Minneapolis Lakers
- 1960–1962: St. Louis Hawks

Career highlights
- 8× NBA All-Star (1951–1956, 1958, 1959); All-NBA First Team (1955); All-NBA Second Team (1952); NBA rebounding leader (1952)

Career NBA statistics
- Points: 11,198 (13.7 ppg)
- Rebounds: 8,041 (9.8 rpg)
- Assists: 1,368 (1.7 apg)
- Stats at NBA.com
- Stats at Basketball Reference

Laurence Michael Foust (June 24, 1928 – October 27, 1984) was an American basketball player who spent 12 seasons in the National Basketball Association (NBA), most notably with the Fort Wayne Pistons and Minneapolis Lakers. In a twelve-year career, he was a two-time All-NBA Team member and an eight-time All-Star while reaching the NBA Finals five times. His eight All-Star selections (which occurred in his first nine years as a player) is the most in NBA history for an eligible player who has not been selected to the Naismith Basketball Hall of Fame.

== Early life ==
Foust was born on June 24, 1928, in Painesville, Ohio. He attended South Catholic High School (later St. John Neumann High School, now Saints Neumann Goretti High School) in Philadelphia, Pennsylvania, where he was a record breaking scorer on the basketball team. He led the team to three Philadelphia Catholic League or City Championship basketball games, winning in 1944 and 1945 and losing in 1946 (Foust's senior year). Foust was 6 ft 7 in (2.01 m) as a junior, and 6 ft 9 in (2.06 m) as a senior, playing center on the team. Foust was instrumental in winning the City Championship in 1945 against public school archrival Southern High School, 37–36, by scoring a last second tap-in basket; playing before a crowd of over 12,000 people.

== College basketball ==
Foust was nationally recruited to play college basketball, and chose La Salle University (then La Salle College) in Philadelphia, where he played from 1946 to 1950. Over his four-year varsity basketball career at La Salle, as a 6ft 9 in center (with size 15.5 feet), Foust averaged 14.2 points per game. He averaged 16.7 points per game as a sophomore and 16.2 as a junior. While in college he went from 235 pounds (106.6 kg) to 275 pounds (124.7), but was still known for speed and agility, as well as fierce rebounding.

The Explorers led by Foust reached the National Invitational Tournament twice, in 1948 and 1950, with the former being the first postseason appearance in school history. One of Foust's teammates on the 1950 team was future National Collegiate Basketball Hall of Fame coach Jim Phelan. Foust was named to the All-City team four times while at La Salle, named to the All-East Team, and selected as an honorable mention All-American in 1949. He was named to the Associated Press's (AP) 1948-49 and 1949-50 All-Pennsylvania college basketball teams. In 1962, Foust was inducted into La Salle's Hall of Athletes.

== Professional career ==
Foust was selected by the Chicago Stags in the 1950 NBA draft, at a time when the team was in financial distress and on the verge of leaving the NBA. The Stags franchise folded before the start of the 1950–51 NBA season, and was originally to be replaced by a new Chicago team, the Bruins, headed by Harlem Globetrotters owner Abe Saperstein. Saperstein had signed Foust, but never reached an agreement to have this new team actually join the NBA. Foust ultimately joined the Fort Wayne Pistons for the 1950-51 NBA season.

=== Fort Wayne Pistons ===
Foust played seven seasons at center for the Fort Wayne Pistons (1950-57), and was selected as an All-Star the first six seasons. As a rookie (1950-51), he averaged 13.5 points and a team-leading 10 rebounds per game. On November 22, 1950, Foust scored the winning basket in a 19–18 Pistons victory over the Minneapolis Lakers, the lowest scoring game in NBA history. In 1951-52, he averaged 15.9 points and an again team-high 13.3 rebounds per game (tied for second best in the NBA). He also tied future teammate Mel Hutchins for the league high in total rebounds with 880. In addition to being an All-Star, Foust was named second-team All-NBA in 1952. He averaged 15 points, 15 rebounds and 2.5 assists in a two-game playoff loss to the Rochester Royals.

In 1952-53, the Pistons had a winning record for the first time with Foust on the team (36–33), and won in the first round of the playoffs over the Royals, with Foust averaging 19.7 points per game. The Pistons lost to the eventual NBA champion Minneapolis Lakers in a five-game series for the Western Division title, Foust leading the Pistons with 18.4 points per game. During the regular season, Foust averaged 14.3 points and 11.5 rebounds (5th in the NBA) per game. In 1953-54, on a Pistons team that now included All-Stars Hutchins, Andy Phillip, Jack Molinas and future Naismith Memorial Basketball Hall of Fame forward George Yardley, Foust averaged teams high of 15.1 points (8th in the NBA) and 13.4 rebounds (3rd in the NBA) per game. He scored 1,090 points to set a new franchise record for points in a season and with his prior season of 1,047 two seasons earlier, he became the first Piston with multiple 1,000 point seasons.

Along with being an All-Star game starter for the first time in 1954-55, Foust was named first-team All-NBA. During the regular season, Foust averaged a team-high 10 rebounds per game, to go along with 17 points per game. He led the NBA in field goal percentage with 48.7%, a career peak.

Coach Paul Birch resigned after the 1953-54 season, and Pistons' owner Fred Zollner hired 7-year NBA referee Charley Eckman as head coach for the 1954-55 team. Eckman had no professional coaching experience, but led the Pistons to their best record in team history (43–29) and the 1955 NBA finals behind the all-star play of Foust, George Yardley and Andy Phillip. Foust averaged 15.3 points per game against the Lakers in winning the Western division finals; and team highs of 15.9 points and 9.3 rebounds per game, to go along with 2.3 assists, in a seven-game NBA finals loss to the Syracuse Nationals. Although Foust scored a game-high 24 points in the decisive Game 7, the Pistons lost 92–91.

Foust was once again an All-Star game starter in 1955-56 (along with teammates Hutchins and Yardley), on a team that reached the NBA finals for a second consecutive year under Eckman. He averaged 16.2 points and nine rebounds per game during the regular season. He averaged 14.2 points in the five game Western division finals win over the Hawks; and 19.4 points, 13 rebounds and 1.8 assists per game in a five-game 1956 NBA finals loss to the Philadelphia Warriors.

The following season (1956-57), Foust was injured and played his fewest games (61) and minutes per game (25.1) as a Piston, though he still averaged 12.4 points and 9.1 rebounds per game. It was his first professional season not making the Western division All-Star team. After the season, Foust was traded to the Minneapolis Lakers for center Walter Dukes.

Over his seven years with the Pistons, Foust averaged a double-double in points (15.0) and rebounds (10.9). Foust had four of the nine 1,000 point seasons by a Pistons player up to that point.

=== Minneapolis Lakers ===
The Lakers' coach and former center George Mikan, the NBA's first superstar, wanted Foust to join the Lakers. Foust regained his form with the Lakers in 1957-58, and was selected as an All-Star for the seventh time. He played in all 72 regular season games, averaging 30.6 minutes per game. He averaged 16.8 points and 12.2 rebounds per game (7th in the NBA) during the regular season.

After going 19–53 in 1957-58, the Lakers improved to 33–39 the following season and reached the NBA finals, led by rookie-of-the-year Elgin Baylor. Foust was selected as an all-star for the eighth and final time. He averaged 12.3 points and 8.7 rebounds in nearly 27 minutes per game during the regular season, playing center. After averaging less than 12 points per game in the first two playoff rounds in 1959, Foust averaged 12.5 points and 15 rebounds per game against Bill Russell and the Boston Celtics in the 1959 NBA Finals. The Celtics swept the series in four games, but in Game 3, Foust led the Lakers in scoring and rebounding totals with 26 points and 22 rebounds, during a 123–110 loss.

Foust had played in 47 games for the Lakers during the 1959-60 season, averaging 13.3 points and 9.3 rebounds in nearly 30 minutes per game, when he was traded to the St. Louis Hawks for Charlie Share, Nick Mantis, Willie Merriweather and substantial cash consideration.

=== St. Louis Hawks ===
Foust played the last 25 games of the 1959-60 season for the Hawks, but played less than 23 minutes per game. Less than two months after being traded, the Hawks faced the Lakers in the Western Division finals, winning the series in seven games. Foust averaged 7.6 points and 6.1 rebounds per game, backing up future Hall of fame center to Clyde Lovellette. He scored 15 points in the Hawks' Game 1 victory, and 12 points in their Game 3 win. The Hawks lost the 1960 NBA finals in seven games to the Celtics, with Foust averaging five points and five rebounds in nearly 16 minutes per game, but he missed the final two games of the series when he suffered a broken hand in Game 5. He signed back with the Hawks in July.

The following two seasons (1960-61 and 1961-62), he remained Lovellette's backup, averaging 8.1 points and 5.7 rebounds, and 9.7 points and 5.8 rebounds per game respectively. The Hawks defeated the now Los Angeles Lakers in the 1961 Western Division finals in a seven-game series, with Foust scoring 14 points in 21 minutes in the Hawks' Game 2 victory. The Hawks lost to Celtics in five games in the 1961 NBA Finals, with Foust playing sparingly.

During his final season, in an early January 1962 game, Foust started in place of an injured Lovellette, and scored 28 points against Wilt Chamberlain and the Philadelphia Warriors. Foust was hampered by injuries during the 1961-62 season, and missed time with ankle and/or foot injuries.

Foust retired in April 1962, to take a job as a salesman in St. Louis. Foust considered his three years with the Hawks the happiest of his career.

=== Career ===
Over his career, Foust had 11,198 points and 8,041 rebounds in 817 games. His points were ninth in league history at the time of retirement (Note: George Mikan is marked as below Foust in points scored (10,156) because of NBL stats (where he scored 1,608) not being recognized); of the top 14, Foust was the only one not inducted into the Hall of Fame. His rebounds were fourth most in NBA history. He was the second NBA player to participate in the NBA finals with three different teams, after Max Zaslofsky.

== Legacy ==
Foust utilized his height and strength to stifle his opponents in the paint. His 48.7% field goal percentage in the 1954–55 season set a new NBA record for four years. Author Robert Cohen, in selecting an all-star team from the 1946-1960 era of the NBA, chose Foust as the fifth-best center, noting that Foust "in many ways represented one of the finest early prototypes of what eventually became the modernized basketball big man. Although Foust had considerable bulk and displayed a great deal of aggression under the boards, he also exhibited a fair amount of agility and ballhandling skills." Hall of fame guard Slater Martin described Foust as among the players who would knock players down if they went in the lane on offense.

When calculating players of Hall of Fame Probability, Basketball Reference has him listed as 76th with 94.2%, which is the highest among eligible players that are not in the Naismith Basketball Hall of Fame. He is one of just five players (Bob Cousy, Dolph Schayes, Ed Macauley, Harry Gallatin) who was named to each of the NBA's first six All-Star teams (1951–1956) but he is the only one to not be in the Hall. He is also the only player with eight All-Star Game selections to not be inducted.

La Salle teammate Jim Phelan called Foust a "great player".

== NBA career statistics ==
Legend
| GP | Games played | GS | Games started | MPG | Minutes per game |
| FG% | Field goal percentage | 3P% | 3-point field goal percentage | FT% | Free throw percentage |
| RPG | Rebounds per game | APG | Assists per game | SPG | Steals per game |
| BPG | Blocks per game | PPG | Points per game | **Bold** | Career high |
| * | Led the league |

=== Regular season ===
| Year | Team | GP | MPG | FG% | FT% | RPG | APG | PPG |
|---|---|---|---|---|---|---|---|---|
| 1950–51 | Fort Wayne | 68 | – | .346 | .659 | 10.0 | 1.3 | 13.5 |
| 1951–52 | Fort Wayne | 66 | **39.6** | 394 | .678 | 13.3 | **3.0** | 15.9 |
| 1952–53 | Fort Wayne | 67 | 34.4 | .360 | .723 | 11.5 | 2.3 | 14.3 |
| 1953–54 | Fort Wayne | **72** | 37.4 | .409 | .712 | **13.4** | 2.2 | 15.1 |
| 1954–55 | Fort Wayne | 70 | 32.3 | **.487*** | .766 | 10.0 | 1.7 | **17.0** |
| 1955–56 | Fort Wayne | **72** | 28.1 | .447 | .778 | 9.0 | 1.8 | 16.2 |
| 1956–57 | Fort Wayne | 61 | 25.1 | .394 | .718 | 9.1 | 1.2 | 12.4 |
| 1957–58 | Minneapolis | **72** | 30.6 | .398 | .756 | 12.2 | 1.5 | 16.8 |
| 1958–59 | Minneapolis | **72** | 26.8 | .390 | .765 | 8.7 | 1.3 | 12.3 |
| 1959–60 | Minneapolis/St.Louis | **72** | 27.3 | .407 | .791 | 8.6 | 1.3 | 12.2 |
| 1960–61 | St. Louis | 68 | 17.8 | .397 | .788 | 5.7 | 1.1 | 8.1 |
| 1961–62 | St. Louis | 57 | 20.2 | .471 | **.815** | 5.8 | 1.4 | 9.7 |
| Career | | 817 | 29.2 | .405 | .741 | 9.8 | 1.7 | 13.7 |
| All-Star | | 7 | 16.9 | .315 | .938 | 7.0 | 0.4 | 7.0 |

=== Playoffs ===
| Year | Team | GP | MPG | FG% | FT% | RPG | APG | PPG |
|---|---|---|---|---|---|---|---|---|
| 1951 | Fort Wayne | 3 | – | .311 | .800 | 12.3 | 1.7 | 12.0 |
| 1952 | Fort Wayne | 2 | 38.5 | .522 | **.857** | **15.0** | 2.5 | 15.0 |
| 1953 | Fort Wayne | 8 | **41.5** | .397 | .838 | 13.9 | 0.8 | 19.1 |
| 1954 | Fort Wayne | 4 | 32.3 | .268 | .760 | 9.5 | 1.8 | 10.3 |
| 1955 | Fort Wayne | 11 | 30.1 | .395 | .712 | 9.7 | 2.4 | 15.6 |
| 1956 | Fort Wayne | 10 | 28.9 | .377 | .787 | 12.7 | 1.4 | 16.8 |
| 1957 | Fort Wayne | 2 | 32.0 | **.565** | .826 | 12.5 | **3.0** | **22.5** |
| 1959 | Minneapolis | **13** | 31.1 | .418 | .820 | 10.5 | 0.9 | 11.8 |
| 1960 | St. Louis | 12 | 17.1 | .392 | .800 | 5.7 | 0.9 | 6.5 |
| 1961 | St. Louis | 8 | 11.1 | .450 | .571 | 3.5 | 0.3 | 3.3 |
| Career | | 73 | 27.4 | .394 | .781 | 9.7 | 1.3 | 12.4 |

== Personal life and death ==
Immediately after retiring, he had taken a sales and marketing job with the Presstite division of the Martin Marietta Corporation in the St. Louis area. After retirement, he worked in the business of building material and artificial turf production. He also served as a youth counselor for the state of Pennsylvania.

Foust died in 1984 of a heart attack at age 56. He lived in Mount Lebanon, Pennsylvania, at the time of death, and was survived by his wife and four children. Foust's mother was still living at the time of his death.
