= 1955–56 Fort Wayne Pistons season =

NBA team season

- Division champions
- Head coach: Charles Eckman
- Owner: Fred Zollner
- Arena: War Memorial Coliseum

Results
- Record: 37–35 (.514)
- Place: Division: 1st (Western)
- Playoff finish: NBA Finals (eliminated 1–4)
- Stats at Basketball Reference

Local media
- Television: WKJG-TV
- Radio: WOWO

The 1955–56 Fort Wayne Pistons season was the eighth season for the Pistons in the National Basketball Association (NBA) and 15th season as a franchise.

The Pistons would finish with a 37-35 (.514) record, 1st in the NBA Western Division and the only division team above .500 on the season. In the Western Division Finals the Pistons defeated the St. Louis Hawks in a best-of-five series 3–2 to reach the NBA Finals for the second straight season. They would go on to lose the Finals in five games to the Philadelphia Warriors. The team was led by forward Mel Hutchins (12.0 ppg, 7. rpg, NBA All-Star), forward George Yardley (17.4 ppg, 9.7 rpg, NBA All-Star) and center Larry Foust (16.2 ppg, 9.0 rpg, NBA All-Star).

The Pistons also drafted their first black player in the team's history, Jesse Arnelle out of Penn State in the 2nd round of the 1955 NBA draft. Arnelle initially refused to sign with Fort Wayne, playing for the Harlem Globetrotters, but signed with the Pistons after the conclusion of the Globetrotters European tour, played in 31 games, averaging 4.7 ppg and 5.5 rpg, before breaking his nose in February to end the season. Arnelle did not return to Fort Wayne the following season, ending his professional basketball career. He became a successful lawyer and would serve on the Penn State Board of Trustees.

== Roster ==
1955–56 Fort Wayne Pistons roster
Players

Pos.	No.	Player	Height	Weight	DOB	From
PF	15, 18	Jesse Arnelle	6 ft 5 in (1.96 m)	220 lb (100 kg)	December 30, 1933	Penn State
C	18	Don Bielke	6 ft 7 in (2.01 m)	240 lb (109 kg)	May 10, 1932	Valparaiso
PG	7	Frankie Brian	6 ft 1 in (1.85 m)	180 lb (82 kg)	May 1, 1923	LSU
SF	6	Chuck Cooper	6 ft 5 in (1.96 m)	210 lb (95 kg)	September 29, 1926	Duquesne
SG	7, 8	Corky Devlin	6 ft 5 in (1.96 m)	195 lb (88 kg)	December 21, 1931	George Washington
C	16	Larry Foust	6 ft 9 in (2.06 m)	215 lb (98 kg)	June 24, 1928	La Salle
SF	10	Jim Holstein	6 ft 3 in (1.91 m)	180 lb (82 kg)	September 24, 1930	Cincinnati
F	15	Johnny Horan	6 ft 8 in (2.03 m)	190 lb (86 kg)	November 24, 1932	Dayton
C	17	Bob Houbregs	6 ft 8 in (2.03 m)	225 lb (102 kg)	March 12, 1932	Washington
PF	9	Mel Hutchins	6 ft 6 in (1.98 m)	200 lb (91 kg)	November 22, 1928	BYU
SG	5	Chuck Noble	6 ft 4 in (1.93 m)	190 lb (86 kg)	July 24, 1931	Louisville
PG	14	Andy Phillip	6 ft 2 in (1.88 m)	195 lb (88 kg)	March 7, 1922	Illinois
SF	8, 15	Odie Spears	6 ft 5 in (1.96 m)	205 lb (93 kg)	June 17, 1924	Western Kentucky
SF	12	George Yardley	6 ft 5 in (1.96 m)	190 lb (86 kg)	November 3, 1928	Stanford
SG	10	Max Zaslofsky	6 ft 2 in (1.88 m)	170 lb (77 kg)	December 7, 1925	St. John's

Coaches
Head coach

Charles Eckman

Legend
- (DP) Unsigned draft pick
- (FA) Free agent
- (S) Suspended
- Injured

Roster

== Regular season ==
=== Season standings ===
Western Division	W	L	PCT	GB	Home	Road	Neutral	Div
x-Fort Wayne Pistons	37	35	.514	-	19-7	10-17	8-11	19-17
x-Minneapolis Lakers	33	39	.458	4	14-12	6-21	13-6	19-17
x-St. Louis Hawks	33	39	.458	4	15-11	11-17	7-11	18-18
Rochester Royals	31	41	.431	6	15-14	6-21	10-6	16-20

x – clinched playoff spot

=== Game log ===
1955–56 Game log
#	Date	Opponent	Score	High points	Record
1	November 5	@ Syracuse	113–114 (OT)	Hutchins, Yardley (24)	0–1
2	November 6	Minneapolis	96–95	Larry Foust (25)	0–2
3	November 12	N Rochester	84–79	Larry Foust (14)	0–3
4	November 13	Syracuse	79–93	Bob Houbregs (22)	1–3
5	November 17	N New York	110–88	George Yardley (22)	1–4
6	November 19	@ Boston	102–104	Larry Foust (25)	1–5
7	November 20	New York	119–115 (OT)	Larry Foust (30)	1–6
8	November 24	Rochester	93–104	George Yardley (28)	2–6
9	November 26	@ Philadelphia	82–87	George Yardley (22)	2–7
10	November 27	St. Louis	106–114 (OT)	George Yardley (29)	3–7
11	November 29	@ New York	104–99	Larry Foust (28)	4–7
12	November 30	@ Rochester	76–87	Odie Spears (19)	4–8
13	December 4	Boston	90–111	Larry Foust (18)	5–8
14	December 6	N Syracuse	88–90	Larry Foust (18)	6–8
15	December 8	Syracuse	94–105	Chuck Noble (28)	7–8
16	December 10	@ Rochester	116–117 (OT)	Bob Houbregs (26)	7–9
17	December 11	Philadelphia	91–96	George Yardley (23)	8–9
18	December 14	N Minneapolis	98–85	Larry Foust (22)	8–10
19	December 15	@ Philadelphia	73–80	Noble, Yardley (14)	8–11
20	December 17	New York	100–95	George Yardley (17)	8–12
21	December 18	Minneapolis	86–96	Larry Foust (33)	9–12
22	December 25	New York	87–92	Bob Houbregs (15)	10–12
23	December 26	N St. Louis	67–83	George Yardley (15)	11–12
24	December 29	Rochester	75–83	Bob Houbregs (14)	12–12
25	December 30	N St. Louis	89–90	Hutchins, Phillip (18)	13–12
26	January 1	St. Louis	68–85	Chuck Noble (21)	14–12
27	January 2	N Minneapolis	95–89	Larry Foust (25)	14–13
28	January 3	@ Philadelphia	82–102	George Yardley (22)	14–14
29	January 4	@ Rochester	88–86	George Yardley (25)	15–14
30	January 5	N Philadelphia	81–92	George Yardley (21)	16–14
31	January 7	@ St. Louis	108–97	Foust, Noble (22)	17–14
32	January 8	St. Louis	96–91	George Yardley (20)	17–15
33	January 10	Boston	89–105	Chuck Noble (21)	18–15
34	January 14	@ Minneapolis	94–117	Larry Foust (21)	18–16
35	January 15	Minneapolis	99–104	Bob Houbregs (24)	19–16
36	January 17	N Boston	85–91	Larry Foust (18)	19–17
37	January 18	N Boston	90–95	George Yardley (30)	19–18
38	January 19	N St. Louis	83–90	Hutchins, Yardley (18)	20–18
39	January 21	@ Philadelphia	92–91	George Yardley (27)	21–18
40	January 22	Rochester	93–111	Corky Devlin (18)	22–18
41	January 25	N Boston	101–100	Mel Hutchins (24)	23–18
42	January 27	@ Boston	106–97	George Yardley (23)	24–18
43	January 28	@ New York	92–91 (OT)	George Yardley (25)	25–18
44	January 29	Philadelphia	85–99	Bob Houbregs (18)	26–18
45	February 2	@ St. Louis	90–98	Andy Phillip (17)	26–19
46	February 4	N St. Louis	98–94	George Yardley (23)	26–20
47	February 5	@ Syracuse	85–90	Bob Houbregs (19)	26–21
48	February 6	Syracuse	98–99	George Yardley (26)	27–21
49	February 8	@ Minneapolis	82–106	Larry Foust (17)	27–22
50	February 11	@ Rochester	93–97	Bob Houbregs (23)	27–23
51	February 12	Minneapolis	78–82	George Yardley (28)	28–23
52	February 13	N Philadelphia	105–94	Bob Houbregs (22)	28–24
53	February 15	N Philadelphia	101–78	George Yardley (19)	28–25
54	February 16	Rochester	81–93	Larry Foust (18)	29–25
55	February 18	@ Syracuse	84–85	George Yardley (30)	29–26
56	February 19	@ St. Louis	89–83	Mel Hutchins (18)	30–26
57	February 20	N St. Louis	84–82	Mel Hutchins (15)	30–27
58	February 21	Rochester	106–102	Larry Foust (22)	30–28
59	February 23	@ Syracuse	92–94	Larry Foust (19)	30–29
60	February 25	@ Rochester	97–72	Larry Foust (22)	31–29
61	February 26	@ Minneapolis	95–90	Larry Foust (25)	32–29
62	February 27	Syracuse	98–95 (OT)	Larry Foust (28)	32–30
63	February 28	@ New York	99–95	Larry Foust (19)	33–30
64	February 29	@ Boston	99–106	Larry Foust (26)	33–31
65	March 2	N New York	97–104	Mel Hutchins (21)	34–31
66	March 3	@ St. Louis	86–92	Bob Houbregs (16)	34–32
67	March 4	Rochester	88–103	George Yardley (22)	35–32
68	March 7	@ Minneapolis	95–98	Corky Devlin (19)	35–33
69	March 8	Minneapolis	82–100	George Yardley (26)	36–33
70	March 10	N Boston	106–103	George Yardley (26)	37–33
71	March 11	New York	122–96	Spears, Yardley (20)	37–34
72	March 14	@ Minneapolis	96–100	Houbregs, Yardley (20)	37–35

== Playoffs ==
1956 playoff game log
Division Finals: 3–2 (home: 2–1; road: 1–1)

Game	Date	Team	Score	High points	Location	Series
1	March 22	St. Louis	L 85–86	George Yardley (23)	War Memorial Coliseum	0–1
2	March 24	@ St. Louis	L 74–84	Larry Foust (16)	Kiel Auditorium	0–2
3	March 25	St. Louis	W 107–84	Houbregs, Yardley (19)	War Memorial Coliseum	1–2
4	March 27	@ St. Louis	W 93–84	George Yardley (30)	Kiel Auditorium	2–2
5	March 29	St. Louis	W 102–97	Foust, Yardley (20)	War Memorial Coliseum	3–2

NBA Finals: 1–4 (home: 1–1; road: 0–3)

Game	Date	Team	Score	High points	High rebounds	High assists	Location Attendance	Series
1	March 31	@ Philadelphia	L 94–98	George Yardley (27)	George Yardley (15)	Hutchins, Phillip (6)	Philadelphia Civic Center; 4,128	0–1
2	April 1	Philadelphia	W 84–83	George Yardley (30)	George Yardley (19)	Andy Phillip (5)	War Memorial Coliseum; 6,976	1–1
3	April 3	@ Philadelphia	L 96–100	Larry Foust (19)	Larry Foust (14)	Chuck Noble (4)	Philadelphia Civic Center; 11,698	1–2
4	April 5	Philadelphia	L 105–107	George Yardley (21)	Larry Foust (14)	Andy Phillip (6)	War Memorial Coliseum; 7,852	1–3
5	April 7	@ Philadelphia	L 88–99	George Yardley (30)	George Yardley (20)	Corky Devlin (6)	Philadelphia Civic Center; 11,194	1–4

1956 schedule
