= 1956 NBA playoffs =

Postseason tournament

Tournament details
- Dates: March 15 – April 7, 1956
- Season: 1955–56
- Teams: 6

Final positions
- Champions: Philadelphia Warriors (2nd title)
- Runners-up: Fort Wayne Pistons
- Semifinalists: St. Louis Hawks; Syracuse Nationals

Tournament statistics
- Scoring leader(s): Paul Arizin (Warriors) (28.9 PPG)

The 1956 NBA playoffs was the postseason tournament of the National Basketball Association's 1955–56 season. The tournament concluded with the Eastern Conference champion Philadelphia Warriors defeating the Western Conference champion Fort Wayne Pistons 4 games to 1 in the NBA Finals.

It was the Warriors' second NBA title; their first was in 1947 back when the NBA was known as the BAA. They would have to wait until 1975 to taste championship gold again; by that time they had moved to the Bay Area and become the Golden State Warriors. Philadelphia's later team, the Philadelphia 76ers, would win the title in 1967.

This was the Pistons' second straight trip to the NBA Finals, but they would not make another appearance until 1988 as the Detroit Pistons. No team from Indiana would return to the NBA Finals until the Indiana Pacers did so in 2000.

The play-in game between the Syracuse Nationals and the New York Knicks was the last play-in game to determine a playoff spot until 2020.

== Bracket ==
Division Semifinals
E3	Syracuse	2
E2	Boston	1
W3	St. Louis	2
W2	Minneapolis	1

Division Finals
Eastern Division
E1	Philadelphia*	3
E3	Syracuse	2
Western Division
W1	Fort Wayne*	3
W3	St. Louis	2

NBA Finals
E1	Philadelphia*	4
W1	Fort Wayne*	1

- * Division winner
- Bold Series winner
- Italic Team with home-court advantage in NBA Finals

== Division Tiebreakers ==
=== Eastern Division Tiebreaker ===
==== New York Knicks @ Syracuse Nationals ====
March 15

Boxscore

New York Knicks 77, Syracuse Nationals 82
Scoring by quarter: 19–17, 21–27, 21–20, 16–18
Pts: Harry Gallatin 19; Rebs: Ray Felix 13; Asts: Dick McGuire 9	Pts: Dolph Schayes 14; Rebs: Dolph Schayes 14; Asts: Seymour, King 6 each
Syracuse finishes as the East's #3 seed, New York fails to qualify

Onondaga War Memorial, Syracuse, New York
Referees: Sid Borgia, Mendy Rudolph

=== Western Division Tiebreaker ===
==== Minneapolis Lakers @ St. Louis Hawks ====
March 16

Boxscore

Minneapolis Lakers 103, St. Louis Hawks 97
Scoring by quarter: 27–33, 25–19, 29–17, 22–28
Pts: Slater Martin 28	Pts: Bob Pettit 22
Minneapolis finishes as the West's #2 seed, St. Louis as the West's #3 seed

Kiel Auditorium, St. Louis, Missouri
Referees: Mendy Rudolph, Arnie Heft

== Division Semifinals ==
=== Eastern Division Semifinals ===
==== (2) Boston Celtics vs. (3) Syracuse Nationals ====
March 17

Boxscore

Syracuse Nationals 93, Boston Celtics 110
Scoring by quarter: 22–25, 19–26, 31–29, 21–30
Pts: Ed Conlin 21; Asts: Dolph Schayes 6	Pts: Bob Cousy 29; Asts: Bob Cousy 9
Boston leads series, 1–0

Boston Garden, Boston, Massachusetts

March 19

Boxscore

Boston Celtics 98, Syracuse Nationals 101
Scoring by quarter: 21–21, 29–32, 20–28, 28–20
Pts: Bob Cousy 28; Rebs: Arnie Risen 17; Asts: Bob Cousy 10	Pts: Red Kerr 23; Rebs: Red Kerr 14; Asts: Seymour, Schayes 5 each
Series tied, 1–1

Onondaga War Memorial, Syracuse, New York

March 21

Boxscore

Syracuse Nationals 102, Boston Celtics 97
Scoring by quarter: 21–22, 36–23, 21–31, 24–21
Pts: Dolph Schayes 27; Rebs: Dolph Schayes 17; Asts: Dolph Schayes 5	Pts: Bill Sharman 24; Rebs: Arnie Risen 15; Asts: Bob Cousy 7
Syracuse wins series, 2–1

Boston Garden, Boston, Massachusetts

This was the fifth playoff meeting between these two teams, with the Nationals winning three of the first four meetings.

Previous playoff series
Syracuse leads 3–1 in all-time playoff series

1953

Boston Celtics 2, Syracuse Nationals 0

1953 Eastern Division Semifinals

1954

Boston Celtics 0, Syracuse Nationals 2

1954 Eastern Division Round Robin Semifinals

1954

Boston Celtics 0, Syracuse Nationals 2

1954 Eastern Division Finals

1955

Boston Celtics 1, Syracuse Nationals 3

1955 Eastern Division Finals

=== Western Division Semifinals ===
==== (2) Minneapolis Lakers vs. (3) St. Louis Hawks ====
March 17

Boxscore

Minneapolis Lakers 115, St. Louis Hawks 116
Scoring by quarter: 31–25, 29–20, 31–39, 24–32
Pts: Mikkelsen, Martin 19 each	Pts: Bob Pettit 25
St. Louis leads series, 1–0

Kiel Auditorium, St. Louis, Missouri

March 19

Boxscore

St. Louis Hawks 75, Minneapolis Lakers 133
Scoring by quarter: 15–25, 15–36, 24–36, 21–36
Pts: Bob Pettit 14	Pts: Slater Martin 19
Series tied, 1–1

Minneapolis Auditorium, Minneapolis, Minnesota

- To date, this 58-point margin remains the Hawks' worst playoff loss and the Lakers' largest playoff win in franchise history.

March 21

Boxscore

St. Louis Hawks 116, Minneapolis Lakers 115
Scoring by quarter: 20–27, 32–29, 33–28, 31–31
Pts: Bob Pettit 41	Pts: Clyde Lovellette 31
St. Louis wins series, 2–1

Minneapolis Auditorium, Minneapolis, Minnesota

- George Mikan’s final NBA game.

This was the first playoff meeting between these two teams.

== Division Finals ==
=== Eastern Division Finals ===
==== (1) Philadelphia Warriors vs. (3) Syracuse Nationals ====
March 23

Boxscore

Syracuse Nationals 87, Philadelphia Warriors 109
Scoring by quarter: 17–28, 27–23, 25–24, 18–34
Pts: Dolph Schayes 19; Rebs: Kerr, Schayes 14 each Asts: George King 8	Pts: Paul Arizin 29; Rebs: Neil Johnston 24; Asts: Gola, Beck 5 each
Philadelphia leads series, 1–0

Philadelphia Civic Center, Philadelphia, Pennsylvania

March 25

Boxscore

Philadelphia Warriors 118, Syracuse Nationals 122
Scoring by quarter: 38–35, 19–27, 33–36, 28–24
Pts: Neil Johnston 43; Rebs: Neil Johnston 16; Asts: Neil Johnston 7	Pts: Dolph Schayes 33; Rebs: Dolph Schayes 16; Asts: George King 10
Series tied, 1–1

Onondaga War Memorial, Syracuse, New York

March 27

Boxscore

Syracuse Nationals 96, Philadelphia Warriors 119
Scoring by quarter: 23–32, 24–30, 25–25, 24–32
Pts: Ed Conlin 19; Rebs: Dolph Schayes 21; Asts: George King 6	Pts: Joe Graboski 20; Rebs: Neil Johnston 18; Asts: Tom Gola 10
Philadelphia leads series, 2–1

Philadelphia Civic Center, Philadelphia, Pennsylvania

March 28

Boxscore

Philadelphia Warriors 104, Syracuse Nationals 108
Scoring by quarter: 31–26, 25–26, 18–30, 30–26
Pts: Neil Johnston 35; Rebs: Neil Johnston 12; Asts: Neil Johnston 7	Pts: George King 25; Rebs: Red Kerr 9 Asts: George King 15
Series tied, 2–2

Onondaga War Memorial, Syracuse, New York

March 29

Boxscore

Syracuse Nationals 104, Philadelphia Warriors 109
Scoring by quarter: 28–32, 20–24, 25–22, 31–31
Pts: Dolph Schayes 28; Rebs: Dolph Schayes 16; Asts: George King 13	Pts: Paul Arizin 35; Rebs: Neil Johnston 18; Asts: Neil Johnston 8
Philadelphia wins series, 3–2

Philadelphia Civic Center, Philadelphia, Pennsylvania

This was the fourth playoff meeting between these two teams, with the 76ers/Nationals winning the first three meetings.

Previous playoff series
Philadelphia 76ers/ Syracuse Nationals leads 3–0 in all-time playoff series

1950

Philadelphia Warriors 0, Syracuse Nationals 2

1950 Eastern Division Semifinals

1951

Philadelphia Warriors 0, Syracuse Nationals 2

1951 Eastern Division Semifinals

1952

Philadelphia Warriors 1, Syracuse Nationals 2

1952 Eastern Division Semifinals

=== Western Division Finals ===
==== (1) Fort Wayne Pistons vs. (3) St. Louis Hawks ====
March 22

Boxscore

St. Louis Hawks 86, Fort Wayne Pistons 85
Scoring by quarter: 27–25, 23–20, 19–23, 17–17
Pts: Al Ferrari 17	Pts: George Yardley 23
St. Louis leads series, 1–0

War Memorial Coliseum, Fort Wayne, Indiana

March 24

Boxscore

Fort Wayne Pistons 74, St. Louis Hawks 84
Scoring by quarter: 12–30, 23–17, 18–19, 21–18
Pts: Larry Foust 16	Pts: Al Ferrari 21
St. Louis leads series, 2–0

Kiel Auditorium, St. Louis, Missouri
Referees: Stan Stutz, Sid Borgia

March 25

Boxscore

St. Louis Hawks 84, Fort Wayne Pistons 107
Scoring by quarter: 19–29, 24–26, 16–22, 25–30
Pts: Alex Hannum 18	Pts: Houbregs, Yardley 19 each
St. Louis leads series, 2–1

War Memorial Coliseum, Fort Wayne, Indiana

March 27

Boxscore

Fort Wayne Pistons 93, St. Louis Hawks 84
Scoring by quarter: 24–21, 28–27, 18–18, 23–18
Pts: George Yardley 30	Pts: Jack Coleman 19
Series tied, 2–2

Kiel Auditorium, St. Louis, Missouri

March 29

Boxscore

St. Louis Hawks 97, Fort Wayne Pistons 102
Scoring by quarter: 19–24, 18–22, 31–21, 29–35
Pts: Jack Coleman 20	Pts: Foust, Yardley 20 each
Fort Wayne wins series, 3–2

War Memorial Coliseum, Fort Wayne, Indiana

- Pistons become first team to come back after from a 2–0 deficit in NBA playoffs.

This was the first playoff meeting between these two teams.

== NBA Finals: (E1) Philadelphia Warriors vs. (W1) Fort Wayne Pistons ==
March 31

Boxscore

Fort Wayne Pistons 94, Philadelphia Warriors 98
Scoring by quarter: 25–20, 24–20, 15–33, 30–25
Pts: George Yardley 27; Rebs: George Yardley 15; Asts: Hutchins, Phillip 6 each	Pts: Paul Arizin 28; Rebs: Neil Johnston 14; Asts: Tom Gola 10
Philadelphia leads series, 1–0

Philadelphia Civic Center, Philadelphia, Pennsylvania
Attendance: 4,128

April 1

Boxscore

Philadelphia Warriors 83, Fort Wayne Pistons 84
Scoring by quarter: 20–20, 26–22, 19–23, 18–19
Pts: Paul Arizin 27; Rebs: Arizin, Johnston 9 each Asts: Ernie Beck 6	Pts: George Yardley 30; Rebs: George Yardley 19; Asts: Andy Phillip 5
Series tied, 1–1

War Memorial Coliseum, Fort Wayne, Indiana
Attendance: 6,976

April 3

Boxscore

Fort Wayne Pistons 96, Philadelphia Warriors 100
Scoring by quarter: 26–25, 25–23, 14–25, 31–27
Pts: Larry Foust 19; Rebs: Larry Foust 14; Asts: Chuck Noble 4	Pts: Paul Arizin 27; Rebs: Neil Johnston 17; Asts: Tom Gola 8
Philadelphia leads series, 2–1

Philadelphia Civic Center, Philadelphia, Pennsylvania
Attendance: 11,698

April 5

Boxscore

Philadelphia Warriors 107, Fort Wayne Pistons 105
Scoring by quarter: 24–24, 26–32, 30–26, 27–23
Pts: Paul Arizin 30; Rebs: Tom Gola 9 Asts: Joe Graboski 7	Pts: George Yardley 21; Rebs: Larry Foust 14; Asts: Andy Phillip 6
Philadelphia leads series, 3–1

War Memorial Coliseum, Fort Wayne, Indiana
Attendance: 7,852

April 7

Boxscore

Fort Wayne Pistons 88, Philadelphia Warriors 99
Scoring by quarter: 24–22, 19–22, 20–28, 25–27
Pts: George Yardley 30; Rebs: George Yardley 20; Asts: Corky Devlin 6	Pts: Joe Graboski 29; Rebs: Joe Graboski 16; Asts: Jack George 10
Philadelphia wins series, 4–1

Philadelphia Civic Center, Philadelphia, Pennsylvania
Attendance: 11,194

This was the first playoff meeting between these two teams.
