= Philadelphia Commercial Museum =

Former museum in Pennsylvania, USA

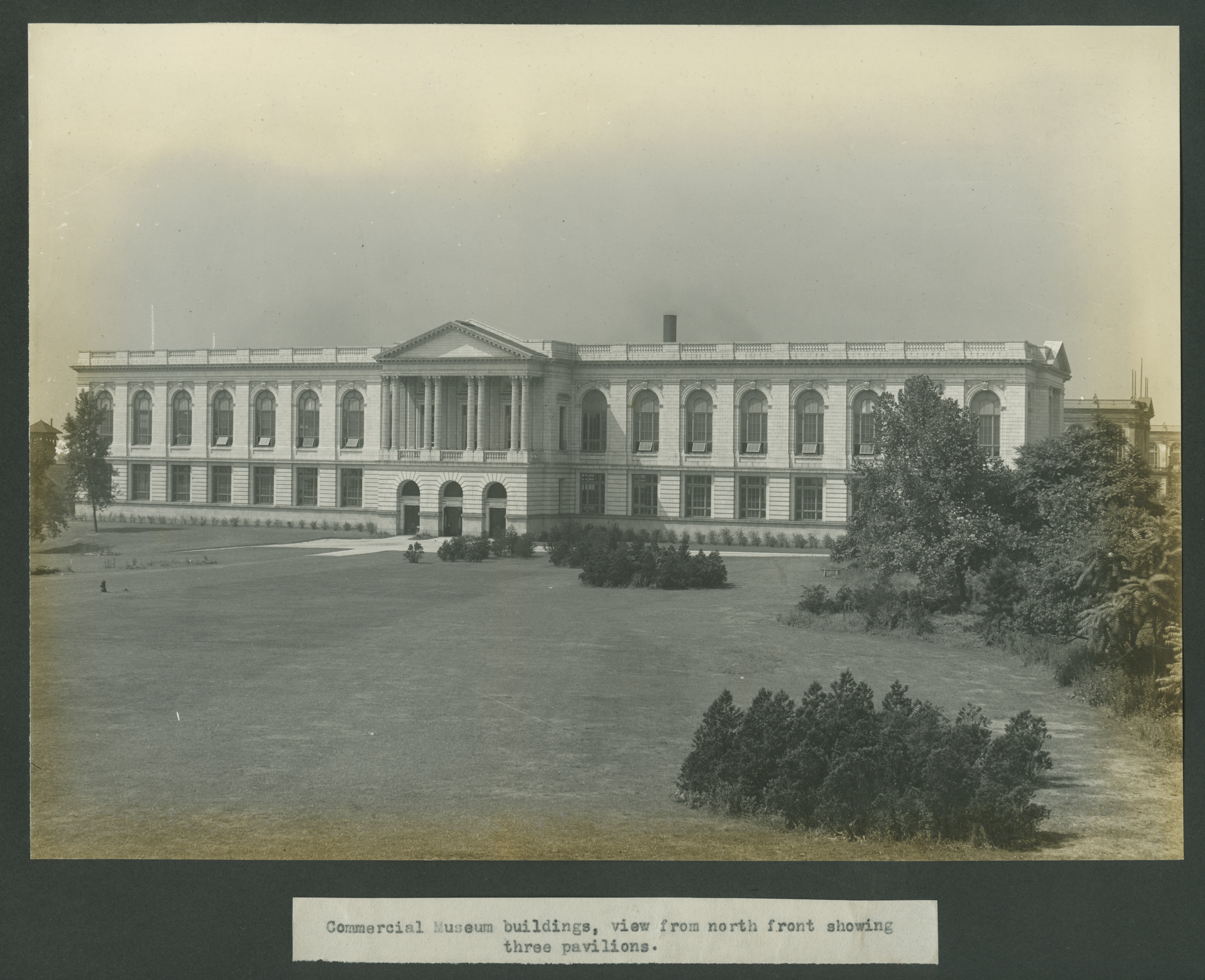
Philadelphia Commercial Museum

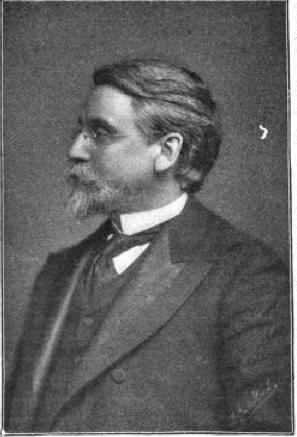
William P. Wilson

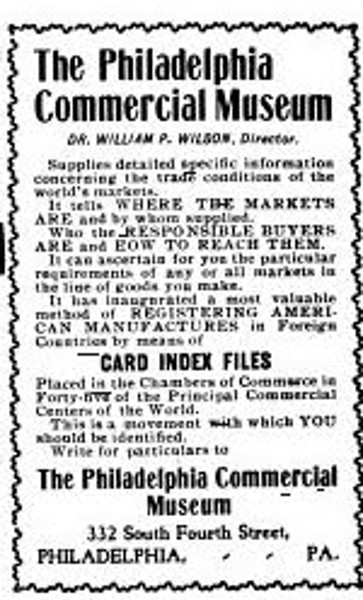
Commercial Museum advertisement, November 1902

The Philadelphia Commercial Museum (also known as the International Bureau of Commerce; later, Museum of the Philadelphia Civic Center) was established in Philadelphia, Pennsylvania in 1895. Its permanent home was a neo-classical building situated at 34th Street and Civic Center Blvd, erected as part of the 1899 National Export Exposition. The museum had business offices at 332 South Fourth Street.

The museum's purpose was to promote domestic and foreign commerce, as well as to collect products and information regarding world trade. It was the first US institution that actively promoted the country's industry and business in foreign markets.

== History ==
In 1893, botanist William P. Wilson, a professor at the University of Pennsylvania, attended the World's Columbian Exposition and suggested the development of a "permanent world's fair museum." He purchased much of the fair's exhibits and after shipping them back to Philadelphia, the museum opened in temporary spaces. Four years after Wilson founded the museum, its official building opened, and in 1899, it was dedicated. William Pepper was the first president of the board of trustees. The old offices of the Pennsylvania Railroad Company were leased, and exhibits were secured from Latin America, Africa, Australia, Japan, and India, forming the largest permanent collection of raw products in existence.

It was Pepper's idea to have the University of Pennsylvania Museum and the Commercial Museum situated near each other, on the plan of the South Kensington Museum. To this end, the City Councils, in 1896, passed an ordinance giving over to the trustees of the Commercial Museum 16 acres (6.5 ha) of land for the erection of suitable buildings. The buildings cost US$1,000,000 to erect. Of this amount Congress appropriated $300,000, with the understanding that the permanent buildings were to become, after the Export Exposition, the home of the Commercial Museum. The state of Pennsylvania appropriated $75,000; the city of Philadelphia, $200,000. Other sums were brought together by general subscriptions from the citizens of Philadelphia, of Pennsylvania, and of the country at large.

The institution had a name change to the Museum of the Philadelphia Civic Center in 1966. The museum closed on July 1, 1994.
