= George Yardley =

American basketball player (1928–2004)

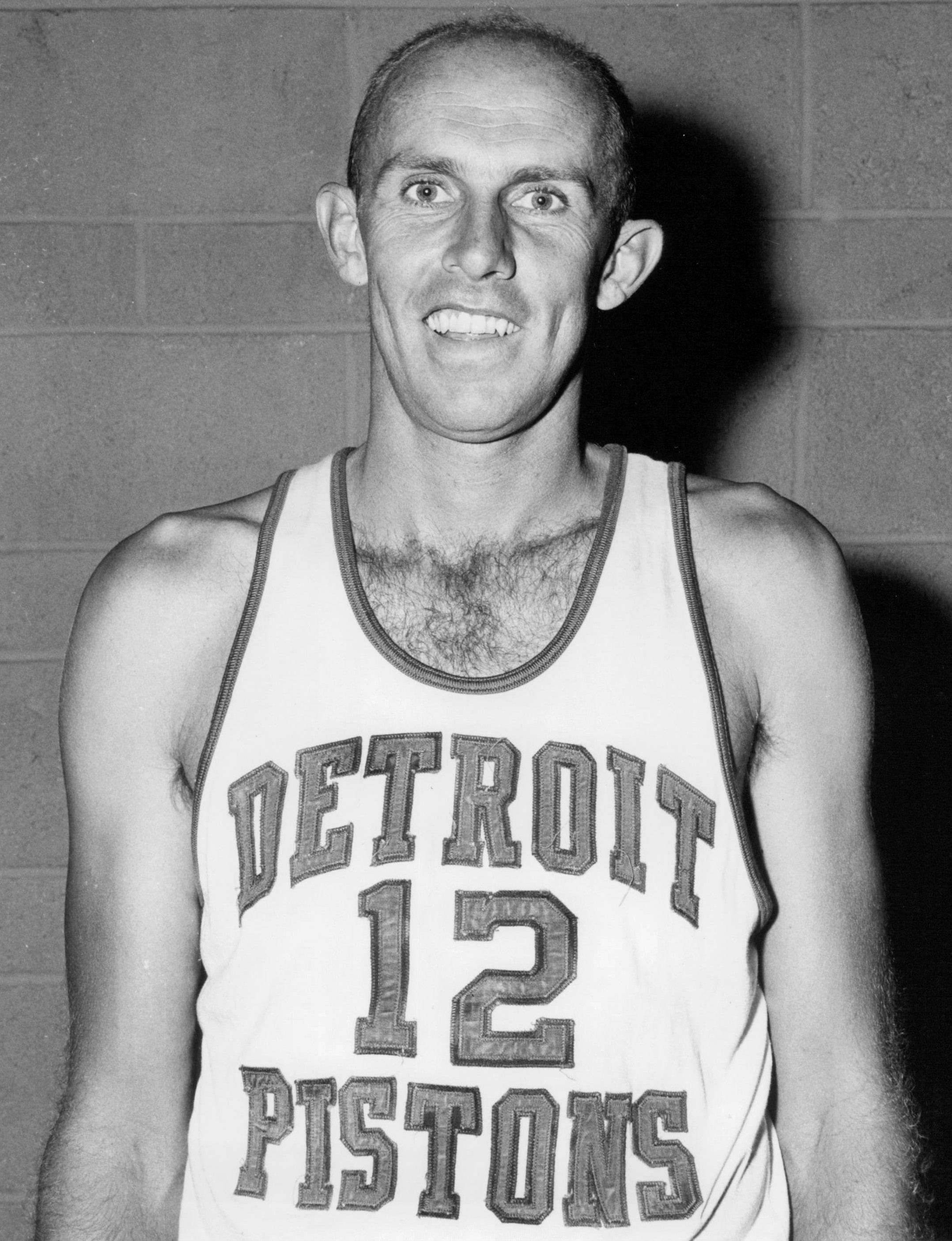
- Yardley in 1958

Personal information
- Born: November 3, 1928 Los Angeles, California, U.S.
- Died: August 12, 2004 (aged 75) Newport Beach, California, U.S.
- Listed height: 6 ft 5 in (1.96 m)
- Listed weight: 190 lb (86 kg)

Career information
- High school: Newport Harbor (Newport Beach, California)
- College: Stanford (1947–1950)
- NBA draft: 1950: 1st round, 7th overall pick
- Drafted by: Fort Wayne Pistons
- Playing career: 1953–1962
- Position: Small forward
- Number: 12

Career history
- 1953–1959: Fort Wayne / Detroit Pistons
- 1959–1960: Syracuse Nationals
- 1961–1962: Los Angeles Jets

Career highlights
- 6× NBA All-Star (1955–1960); All-NBA First Team (1958); All-NBA Second Team (1957); NBA scoring champion (1958); First-team All-PCC (1950)

Career statistics
- Points: 9,063 (19.2 ppg)
- Rebounds: 4,220 (8.9 rpg)
- Assists: 815 (1.7 apg)
- Stats at NBA.com
- Stats at Basketball Reference
- Basketball Hall of Fame
- Collegiate Basketball Hall of Fame

George Harry Yardley III (November 3, 1928 – August 12, 2004) was an American basketball player. He was the first player in National Basketball Association (NBA) history to score 2,000 points in one season, breaking the 1,932-point record held by George Mikan. Yardley was enshrined in the Naismith Memorial Basketball Hall of Fame in 1996.

== Early life ==
Yardley was born on November 3, 1928, in the Hollywood neighborhood of Los Angeles. His father, George H. Jr., was a building contractor, and his mother was Dorothy (Schoyer) Yardley. In 1942 the family moved down south to Balboa Island, Newport Beach. He attended Newport Harbor High School, starring on the basketball team. When he graduated in 1946, Yardley had reached his adult height of 6 ft 5 in (1.96 m), or reached that height between high school and college. He was third-team All-CIF (California Interscholastic Federation) in high school.

== College ==
After high school Yardley matriculated to Stanford University, where he made the basketball team as a walk-on, with no scholarship. He played on the varsity from 1947-50. As a senior, he broke former Stanford star and future Hall of famer Hank Luisetti's 12-year old Pacific Coast Conference (PCC) scoring record (which new record was in turn broken shortly thereafter by future Hall of fame guard Bill Sharman). Hall of Fame coach John Wooden observed Yardley's ability to score in a variety of ways. Yardley was one of the few players dunking at the time. Both Yardley and Sharman were selected to the PCC Southern Division All-Star team in 1950. He was a Helms Foundation second-team All-American in 1950, and two-time All-American.

Yardley graduated in 1950 with a degree in civil engineering, earning both Bachelor’s and Master’s degrees at Stanford. He was also at excellent volleyball player at Stanford. Yardley was a member of Phi Kappa Psi fraternity, and earned the nickname "Yardbird" due to the chores he was required to complete by his fraternity brothers as the youngest man in the fraternity. The nickname was later shortened to "Bird".

In addition to basketball, Yardley was an All-American volleyball player, and five-time tennis champion in his age-bracket.

== AAU ==
After his three-year career at Stanford, Yardley played one year of AAU (Amateur Athletic Union) basketball with Stewart Chevrolet, coached by Luisetti. He later enlisted in the United States Navy and served for two years, playing another two years of AAU basketball at Los Alamitos Naval Air Base. He was an AAU All-American in 1953. Yardley's San Francisco Stewart Chevrolet amateur team won the national AAU championship in 1951, with Yardley being selected the national amateur player-of-the-year. Yardley considered that AAU championship, along with his 2,000 point season, the highlights of his basketball career. Los Alamitos won the all-Navy championship in 1953, with Yardley scoring 38 points in the championship game.

Yardley turned down offers to play professionally, instead playing AAU basketball, so he could maintain his amateur status and be eligible for the 1952 Olympics. However, a broken wrist or hand playing for Los Alamitos in 1952 removed any possibility of that happening, the low point of his basketball career.

After leaving the Navy in 1953, Yardley toured South America with an amateur U.S. basketball team.

During this time-period of playing amateur basketball, he met his future wife Diana Gibson on a blind date arranged by their grandmothers.

== NBA career ==
At 6 ft 5 in, Yardley was a good-sized forward in 1950s basketball and was described as "an offensive-minded player with a knack for scoring" in his Naismith Memorial Basketball Hall of Fame biography. He has been described as a "flamboyant" and "gregarious" player who "never did anything without flair". He was one of the earliest NBA players to perfect and consistently shoot a jump shot, with Bill Sharmin claiming he had the quickest release of any NBA player. With his tremendous leaping ability, Yardley was one of the first to dunk. He was the first player to score over 2,000 points in an NBA season, at a time when teams only played 72 regular season games.

=== Fort Wayne/Detroit Pistons ===
Yardley was drafted by the NBA's Fort Wayne Pistons in the 1950 NBA draft, with the eighth overall pick. After one year of AAU ball and two years in the Navy, Yardley's first NBA season came in 1953-54 with the Pistons. The Pistons offered him $6,000 and he held out as a rookie until they agreed to pay $9,500. He averaged nine points and 6.5 rebounds in nearly 24 minutes per game. This was the only season of his 7-year NBA career in which he did not make the All-Star team.

Paired with fellow All-Star Larry Foust, and playing under coach Charley Eckman, Yardley led the Fort Wayne Pistons to two NBA Finals in the 1954–55 and 1955-56 seasons. In his second season, Yardley averaged 17.3 points and 9.9 rebounds per game, starting at small forward. He and Foust were starters for the Western Division in the 1955 All-Star Game. The Pistons defeated the Minneapolis Lakers in the 1955 Western Division Finals, with Yardley averaging 16 points per game. They lost the NBA Finals in seven games to the Syracuse Nationals, Yardley averaging 15.7 points, 8.6 rebounds and 4.3 assists per game.

Yardley, Foust and teammate Mel Hutchins all started for the Western Division All-Stars the next season (1955–56). On the season, Yardley averaged 17.4 points and 9.7 rebounds per game. The Pistons defeated the St. Louis Hawks in a five-game Western Division Finals playoff series, Yardley leading all players in the series with a 21.2 point per game average. The Pistons lost the 1956 NBA finals in five games to the Philadelphia Warriors. Yardley led all players in the finals with 15.2 rebounds per game, and was second only to future Hall of Famer Paul Arizin with 24.8 points per game.

In addition to being an all-star starter for the third consecutive year in the 1956-57 season, Yardley was fifth in the NBA Most Valuable Player voting and was named second-team All-NBA. He averaged 21.5 points and 10.5 rebounds per game. The Pistons lost to the Lakers in the Western Division Semifinals, though Yardley averaged 28.5 points, 9.5 rebounds and 4.0 assists per game.

Before the 1957-58 season, the now Detroit Pistons signed Yardley to a $25,000 contract, the highest salary in the NBA. It has also been reported that he signed with the Pistons for that league-high salary before the 1958-59 season, only after his productive 1957-58 season; and that the Nationals took on the league high salary and an injured Yardley in a 1959 trade in hopes of dramatically improving their team.

In 1957-58, the Pistons first year in Detroit, Yardley led the league in scoring, averaging 27.8 points per game, nearly three points per game more than runner up Dolph Schayes. He scored 2,001 total points, making him the first NBA player to score 2,000 points in a then 72-game season, while breaking the scoring record previously held by future Hall of Fame center George Mikan (1,932 points). That year, Yardley also set NBA records for most free throws attempted (808) and most free throws made (655), and was named to the All-NBA First Team for the only time in his career. He started in the All-Star game for a fourth consecutive year. The Pistons lost to the Hawks in the Western division finals in five games, with Yardley averaging 22.2 points per game.

=== Syracuse Nationals ===
On February 13, 1959, Yardley was traded to the Syracuse Nationals for Ed Conlin. Yardley had already played in his fifth straight All-Star game as a Piston, though as a reserve for the first time. At the time of the trade, he had played in 46 games for the Pistons, averaging 20.8 points and 7.1 rebounds per game. Conlin had played in 57 games for the Nationals, averaging 11.9 points and 5.3 rebounds per game.

Yardley had suffered a broken finger on his left (non-shooting) hand that caused him to miss some playing time with the Pistons, and to eventually have to wear a cast. Yardley was only able to play in 15 regular season games for the Nationals, averaging 16.7 points and 6.9 rebounds in 28 minutes per game. In the first round of playoffs against the New York Knicks, however, Yardley averaged 23 points per game; and in a seven game series loss against the Boston Celtics in the Eastern division finals, Yardley averaged 25.7 points and 10.3 rebounds in 38.6 minutes a game.

Following a sixth All-Star game selection the following season in 1959–1960 (his first in the Eastern division), during which Yardley averaged 20.2 points and 7.9 rebounds per game, he retired from basketball at the age of 31. Yardley retired to honor a promise to his wife that he would leave basketball to spend more time with his family, and to give full attention to his business.

He was the first player in NBA history to retire after averaging at least 20 points per game in his final year. (Note: Although Alex Groza had a 21.7 PPG average in his final NBA season in 1951, his career ended as a result of a lifelong ban, instead of a voluntary retirement like that of Yardley's.) Yardley averaged 19.2 points per game over his career. He made a brief comeback in the short-lived American Basketball League with the Los Angeles Jets in 1961–62, coached by Bill Sharman; only agreeing, however, to play in home games and to only play in road games if his business schedule permitted. He agreed to play for $500 a game, but was never paid.

== Legacy and honors ==
In 1996, Yardley was elected to the Naismith Memorial Basketball Hall of Fame as a player. Yardley had not expected to enter the Hall of Fame, but Baltimore Sun sports editor Seymour Smith, whom Yardley had never met, successfully advocated Yardley's case for entry.

He was inducted into Stanford's Sports Hall of Fame in 1989. He was inducted into the Southern California Basketball Hall of Fame in 2021.

One of the NBA's 75 greatest players, Jerry West said he patterned his classic and influential jump shot form on Yardley's.

In a tribute to Yardley posted after his death, Hall of Fame coach Pete Newell later said "George Yardley embodies what the Hall of Fame is all about. A marvelous athlete who made full use of his natural talents, a demeanor on the court a coach admires, and a life off the court and after his basketball career ended that has been very successful."

== Post-basketball career ==
Making use of his engineering degree from Stanford, Yardley started his own company selling mechanical engineering equipment, the George Yardley Company, in Fountain Valley, California, following his retirement from the NBA. Yardley patented a seal for the liquid oxygen fuel tank on the Atlas-Titan rocket. He was an avid golf and tennis player, winning seniors titles.

Yardley was modest about his basketball career and his twin sons did not even know their father had been a star NBA player until they were told by a schoolmate in eighth grade.

== Death ==
Yardley died of amyotrophic lateral sclerosis, also known as Lou Gehrig's disease, at the age of 75. After being diagnosed with the disease in 2003, he had raised $120,000 for ALS research at a tribute dinner. Yardley was survived by his four children and 14 grandchildren.

== NBA career statistics ==
Legend
GP	Games played	GS	Games started	MPG	Minutes per game
FG%	Field goal percentage	3P%	3-point field goal percentage	FT%	Free throw percentage
RPG	Rebounds per game	APG	Assists per game	SPG	Steals per game
BPG	Blocks per game	PPG	Points per game	**Bold**	Career high
*	Led the league

=== Regular season ===
Year	Team	GP	MPG	FG%	FT%	RPG	APG	PPG
1953–54	Fort Wayne	63	23.6	.425	.712	6.5	1.6	9.0
1954–55	Fort Wayne	60	35.8	.418	.745	9.9	2.1	17.3
1955–56	Fort Wayne	71	33.1	.407	.742	9.7	**2.2**	17.4
1956–57	Fort Wayne	72	37.4	.410	.787	10.5	2.0	21.5
1957–58	Detroit	72	**39.5**	.414	.811	**10.7**	1.3	**27.8***
1958–59	Detroit	46	30.8	.415	**.816**	7.1	0.9	20.8
1958–59	Syracuse	15	28.0	**.482**	.648	6.9	1.7	16.7
1959–60	Syracuse	**73**	32.9	.453	.816	7.9	1.7	20.2
Career		472	33.4	.422	.780	8.9	1.7	19.2
All-Star		6	21.8	.433	.706	5.8	0.7	10.7

=== Playoffs ===
Year	Team	GP	MPG	FG%	FT%	RPG	APG	PPG
1954	Fort Wayne	4	26.8	**.485**	.833	6.0	0.8	10.5
1955	Fort Wayne	**11**	38.2	.399	.759	9.0	3.3	15.8
1956	Fort Wayne	10	40.6	.421	.776	**13.9**	2.6	23.0
1957	Fort Wayne	2	**42.5**	.453	.818	9.5	**4.0**	**28.5**
1958	Detroit	7	36.3	.409	**.896**	10.3	2.4	23.4
1959	Syracuse	9	37.0	.439	.857	9.7	2.3	25.1
1960	Syracuse	3	29.3	.385	.833	5.7	0.3	13.3
Career		46	36.8	.422	.817	9.9	2.4	20.3
