= Corky Devlin =

American basketball player

Personal information
- Born: December 21, 1931 Atlantic City, New Jersey, U.S.
- Died: April 28, 1995 (aged 63)
- Listed height: 6 ft 5 in (1.96 m)
- Listed weight: 195 lb (88 kg)

Career information
- High school: Central (Newark, New Jersey)
- College: Potomac State (1950–1951); George Washington (1952–1955)
- NBA draft: 1955: 2nd round, 9th overall pick
- Drafted by: Philadelphia Warriors
- Playing career: 1955–1958
- Position: Shooting guard
- Number: 7, 8, 13

Career history
- 1955–1957: Fort Wayne Pistons
- 1957–1958: Minneapolis Lakers

Career NBA statistics
- Points: 1,496 (7.1 ppg)
- Rebounds: 449 (2.1 rpg)
- Assists: 446 (2.1 apg)
- Stats at NBA.com
- Stats at Basketball Reference

Walter James "Corky" Devlin (December 21, 1931 – April 28, 1995) was an American professional basketball player. Devlin played college basketball for the Potomac State Catamounts and George Washington Colonials. He played three seasons in the National Basketball Association (NBA) with two different teams: two seasons with the Fort Wayne Pistons (1955–56 and 1956–57) and one with the Minneapolis Lakers (1957–58). He played in 210 games, averaging 7.1 points, 2.1 rebounds and 2.1 assists per game.

== Career statistics ==
Legend
| GP | Games played | GS | Games started | MPG | Minutes per game |
| FG% | Field goal percentage | 3P% | 3-point field goal percentage | FT% | Free throw percentage |
| RPG | Rebounds per game | APG | Assists per game | SPG | Steals per game |
| BPG | Blocks per game | PPG | Points per game | **Bold** | Career high |
| * | Led the league |

=== NBA ===
==== Regular season ====
| Year | Team | GP | MPG | FG% | FT% | RPG | APG | PPG |
|---|---|---|---|---|---|---|---|---|
| 1955–56 | Fort Wayne | 69 | **22.2** | .370 | .760 | **2.5** | 2.0 | **7.9** |
| 1956–57 | Fort Wayne | **71** | 17.5 | **.378** | .678 | 2.1 | 2.0 | 6.7 |
| 1957–58 | Minneapolis | 70 | 17.8 | .348 | **.773** | 1.9 | **2.4** | 6.8 |
| Career | | 210 | 19.2 | .366 | .742 | 2.1 | 2.1 | 7.1 |

==== Playoffs ====
| Year | Team | GP | MPG | FG% | FT% | RPG | APG | PPG |
|---|---|---|---|---|---|---|---|---|
| 1956 | Fort Wayne | **10*** | **27.5** | .406 | .600 | 2.1 | 2.3 | 9.7 |
| 1957 | Fort Wayne | 1 | 25.0 | **.750** | **1.000** | **5.0** | **5.0** | **13.0** |
| Career | | 11 | 27.3 | .431 | .615 | 2.4 | 2.5 | 10.0 |
