= Chuck Noble =

American basketball player (1931–2011)

Personal information
- Born: July 24, 1931 Akron, Ohio, U.S.
- Died: March 7, 2011 (aged 79)
- Listed height: 6 ft 4 in (1.93 m)
- Listed weight: 190 lb (86 kg)

Career information
- High school: South (Akron, Ohio)
- College: Louisville (1950–1954)
- NBA draft: 1954: 4th round, 30th overall pick
- Drafted by: Philadelphia Warriors
- Playing career: 1954–1962
- Position: Shooting guard
- Number: 5, 14

Career history
- 1954–1955: Akron Goodyear Wingfoots
- 1955–1962: Fort Wayne / Detroit Pistons

Career highlights
- NBA All-Star (1960)

Career NBA statistics
- Points: 3,276 (8.0 ppg)
- Rebounds: 1,075 (2.6 rpg)
- Assists: 1,344 (3.3 apg)
- Stats at NBA.com
- Stats at Basketball Reference

Charles E. Noble (July 24, 1931 – March 7, 2011) was an American professional basketball player.

A 6'4" shooting guard from the University of Louisville, Noble played seven seasons (1955–1962) in the National Basketball Association (NBA) as a member of the Detroit Pistons franchise. He averaged 8.0 points per game and appeared in the 1960 NBA All-Star Game.

Noble later worked in publishing. He died in 2011.

== NBA career statistics ==
Legend
GP	Games played	GS	Games started	MPG	Minutes per game
FG%	Field goal percentage	3P%	3-point field goal percentage	FT%	Free throw percentage
RPG	Rebounds per game	APG	Assists per game	SPG	Steals per game
BPG	Blocks per game	PPG	Points per game	**Bold**	Career high

=== Regular season ===
Year	Team	GP	MPG	FG%	FT%	RPG	APG	PPG
1955–56	Fort Wayne	72	**28.0**	.352	**.749**	**3.6**	3.9	9.5
1956–57	Fort Wayne	54	23.3	**.360**	.745	2.5	3.3	8.8
1957–58	Detroit	61	22.3	.331	.727	2.3	2.5	7.4
1958–59	Detroit	65	14.4	.338	.735	1.8	1.8	7.1
1959–60	Detroit	58	27.9	.357	.732	3.5	**4.6**	**11.3**
1960–61	Detroit	**75**	22.1	.346	.713	2.4	3.8	6.3
1961–62	Detroit	26	13.9	.283	.533	1.7	2.4	2.8
Career		411	22.4	.346	.731	2.6	3.3	8.0
All-Star		1	11.0	.000	–	1.0	3.0	.0

=== Playoffs ===
Year	Team	GP	MPG	FG%	FT%	RPG	APG	PPG
1956	Fort Wayne	**10**	26.1	.315	.941	3.0	4.1	7.4
1957	Fort Wayne	2	22.5	.385	.500	1.5	2.0	**10.5**
1958	Detroit	7	10.3	.211	.500	1.9	.9	2.9
1959	Detroit	3	9.3	.294	**1.000**	.0	.3	4.0
1960	Detroit	2	**30.5**	.269	–	**4.5**	**6.5**	7.0
1961	Detroit	5	24.8	**.444**	.714	1.6	4.2	9.0
Career		29	20.4	.324	.778	2.2	3.0	6.4
