= Bob Houbregs =

Canadian basketball player (1932–2014)

Personal information
- Born: March 12, 1932 Vancouver, British Columbia, Canada
- Died: May 28, 2014 (aged 82) Olympia, Washington, U.S.
- Listed height: 6 ft 7 in (2.01 m)
- Listed weight: 210 lb (95 kg)

Career information
- High school: Queen Anne (Seattle, Washington)
- College: Washington (1950–1953)
- NBA draft: 1953: 1st round, 3rd overall pick
- Drafted by: Milwaukee Hawks
- Playing career: 1953–1958
- Position: Power forward / centre
- Number: 10, 14, 20, 8, 17

Career history
- 1953: Milwaukee Hawks
- 1953–1954: Baltimore Bullets
- 1954: Boston Celtics
- 1954–1958: Fort Wayne / Detroit Pistons

Career highlights
- Helms Foundation Player of the Year (1953); Consensus first-team All-American (1953); Consensus second-team All-American (1952); 3× First-team All-PCC (1951–1953); No. 25 retired by Washington Huskies

Career statistics
- Points: 2,611 (9.3 ppg)
- Rebounds: 1,552 (5.5 rpg)
- Assists: 500 (1.8 apg)
- Stats at NBA.com
- Stats at Basketball Reference
- Basketball Hall of Fame
- Collegiate Basketball Hall of Fame

Robert J. Houbregs (March 12, 1932 – May 28, 2014) was a Canadian professional basketball player. Houbregs was inducted into the Naismith Basketball Hall of Fame in 1987.

== Basketball career ==
A 6-foot 8-inch, 225-pound forward-centre, from Queen Anne High School in Seattle, Washington, Houbregs played for the University of Washington Huskies from 1949 to 1953 (his family moved to Seattle from Vancouver, British Columbia when he was a child). In 1952, Houbregs was a Second Team Consensus All-America selection. In 1953, as a senior, he was named NCAA Player of the Year, was a Consensus All-America selection, helped lead the 1952–53 Huskies to the Final Four in the NCAA tournament, and was named to the All-Tournament team after averaging 34.8 points per game in the post-season. He became the first player to score 40 or more points in an NCAA tournament Final Four game when he scored 42 against LSU in the national third-place game on March 18, 1953.

Houbregs was drafted by the NBA's Milwaukee Hawks with the third overall pick in 1953 and played five seasons (1953–1958) in the NBA with four teams: the Hawks, the Baltimore Bullets, the Boston Celtics, and the Fort Wayne (later Detroit) Pistons. Houbregs' career scoring average was 9.3 points per game.

Houbregs served as general manager of the Seattle SuperSonics from 1970 to 1973.

== Personal life ==
Houbregs' father John was a minor league ice hockey player who moved to Seattle in 1934/35 with his family in order to play for the Seattle Sea Hawks of the North West Hockey League. Houbregs was a member of Alpha Sigma Phi fraternity.

Houbregs was elected to the Naismith Basketball Hall of Fame in 1987.

In 2000, Houbregs was inducted into the Canadian Basketball Hall of Fame for his significant contributions to the sport as a player.

Houbregs died on May 28, 2014, in Olympia, Washington. He was 82 years old.

== Career statistics ==
Legend
GP	Games played	GS	Games started	MPG	Minutes per game
FG%	Field goal percentage	3P%	3-point field goal percentage	FT%	Free throw percentage
RPG	Rebounds per game	APG	Assists per game	SPG	Steals per game
BPG	Blocks per game	PPG	Points per game	**Bold**	Career high
*	Led the league

=== NBA ===
==== Regular season ====
Year	Team	GP	MPG	FG%	FT%	RPG	APG	PPG
1953–54	Milwaukee	11	15.1	.306	.765	4.2	.8	5.8
1953–54	Baltimore	59	**30.6**	.380	.707	5.6	1.9	9.2
1954–55	Baltimore	10	30.0	.359	.706	5.5	**2.8**	9.0
1954–55	Boston	2	7.5	–	**1.000**	.5	1.0	.5
1954–55	Fort Wayne	52	19.4	.391	.707	4.6	1.1	6.4
1955–56	Fort Wayne	**70**	21.9	.430	.739	5.9	2.3	11.1
1956–57	Fort Wayne	60	26.5	**.432**	.714	**6.7**	1.9	**11.2**
1957–58	Detroit	17	17.8	.358	.698	3.8	1.1	7.5
Career		281	23.9	.404	.721	5.5	1.8	9.3

==== Playoffs ====
Year	Team	GP	MPG	FG%	FT%	RPG	APG	PPG
1955	Fort Wayne	**11***	19.4	.381	**.784**	5.6	**1.7**	7.0
1956	Fort Wayne	10*	**21.7**	**.462**	.705	**6.7**	1.4	10.3
1957	Fort Wayne	2	19.0	.412	.727	3.0	1.5	**11.0**
Career		23	20.3	.424	.739	5.9	1.6	8.8
