= 1956–57 Fort Wayne Pistons season =

NBA team season

- Head coach: Charles Eckman
- Owner: Fred Zollner
- Arena: War Memorial Coliseum

Results
- Record: 34–38 (.472)
- Place: Division: 3rd (Western)
- Playoff finish: West Division Semifinals (eliminated 0–2)
- Stats at Basketball Reference

The 1956–57 Fort Wayne Pistons season was the Pistons' ninth season in the NBA, 16th season as a franchise, and the final season for the team in Fort Wayne.

The Pistons finished 34–38 (.472), the first losing season in five years, finishing in a three-way tie for first in the Western Division, but were seeded third after the St. Louis Hawks defeated both the Pistons and the Minneapolis Lakers in tie-breaking games. In the West Semifinals, the Lakers eliminated the Pistons 2–0. The team was led on the season by forward George Yardley (21.5 ppg, 10. rpg, NBA All-Star) and forward-center Mel Hutchins (12.4 ppg, 7.9 rpg, NBA All-Star).

Following the season, the Pistons relocated to Detroit as owner Fred Zollner determined Fort Wayne was too small to support an NBA team. The state of Indiana would not get another pro basketball team until the Indiana Pacers of the ABA was formed in 1967, and then moved to the NBA with the ABA–NBA merger in 1976.

== Regular season ==
=== Season standings ===
Western Division	W	L	PCT	GB	Home	Road	Neutral	Div
x-St. Louis Hawks	34	38	.472	-	17-9	10-20	7-9	22-14
x-Minneapolis Lakers	34	38	.472	-	15-9	5-22	14-7	18-18
x-Fort Wayne Pistons	34	38	.472	-	23-5	5-23	6-10	17-19
Rochester Royals	31	41	.431	3	19-10	7-17	5-14	15-21

x – clinched playoff spot

=== Game log ===
1956–57 Game log
#	Date	Opponent	Score	High points	Record
1	October 27	@ Rochester	85–88	Larry Foust (16)	0–1
2	October 28	Minneapolis	88–94	George Yardley (27)	1–1
3	November 3	@ Philadelphia	81–116	Hutchins, Yardley (16)	1–2
4	November 4	New York	96–83	George Yardley (20)	1–3
5	November 10	@ St. Louis	79–86	George Yardley (16)	1–4
6	November 11	St. Louis	81–96	Corky Devlin (17)	2–4
7	November 15	Boston	95–98	Larry Foust (17)	3–4
8	November 17	@ St. Louis	87–92	George Yardley (17)	3–5
9	November 18	@ Minneapolis	111–107	George Yardley (22)	4–5
10	November 21	N New York	103–104 (OT)	George Yardley (22)	5–5
11	November 22	Rochester	102–104 (OT)	Mel Hutchins (18)	6–5
12	November 24	@ Philadelphia	88–98	Larry Foust (16)	6–6
13	November 25	Philadelphia	88–112	George Yardley (30)	7–6
14	November 27	@ New York	98–105	Bob Houbregs (19)	7–7
15	November 29	@ Syracuse	92–87	Houbregs, Noble (19)	8–7
16	November 30	N Boston	102–104	George Yardley (22)	8–8
17	December 1	@ Boston	93–108	Larry Foust (19)	8–9
18	December 4	N Syracuse	97–96 (OT)	George Yardley (28)	8–10
19	December 6	Syracuse	92–104	George Yardley (24)	9–10
20	December 7	N Syracuse	97–105	Mel Hutchins (20)	10–10
21	December 9	Rochester	101–100 (OT)	Larry Foust (24)	10–11
22	December 11	N Boston	97–113	Mel Hutchins (27)	10–12
23	December 16	New York	80–84	Larry Foust (17)	11–12
24	December 18	N St. Louis	95–84	Bob Houbregs (18)	11–13
25	December 23	Boston	87–95	George Yardley (22)	12–13
26	December 25	N Minneapolis	100–89	Bob Houbregs (19)	12–14
27	December 26	N Rochester	93–99	George Yardley (36)	13–14
28	December 27	Minneapolis	93–120	Bob Houbregs (29)	14–14
29	December 29	@ Rochester	88–95	Houbregs, Yardley (22)	14–15
30	December 30	Philadelphia	99–104	George Yardley (32)	15–15
31	January 3	Minneapolis	102–104	George Yardley (33)	16–15
32	January 5	New York	96–109	George Yardley (32)	17–15
33	January 6	@ Boston	92–118	George Yardley (17)	17–16
34	January 8	N Minneapolis	86–87	George Yardley (23)	18–16
35	January 10	Boston	98–81	George Yardley (21)	18–17
36	January 12	N Minneapolis	105–87	Houbregs, Yardley (15)	18–18
37	January 13	St. Louis	89–91	Mel Hutchins (18)	19–18
38	January 17	N St. Louis	106–82	George Yardley (19)	19–19
39	January 19	@ New York	100–102	George Yardley (25)	19–20
40	January 20	@ Syracuse	98–101	George Yardley (35)	19–21
41	January 22	St. Louis	87–97	George Yardley (21)	20–21
42	January 23	N St. Louis	101–78	George Yardley (21)	20–22
43	January 26	Philadelphia	98–101	George Yardley (32)	21–22
44	January 27	New York	102–103 (OT)	George Yardley (26)	22–22
45	January 29	@ St. Louis	91–85	Mel Hutchins (22)	23–22
46	January 31	@ Minneapolis	111–107	George Yardley (40)	24–22
47	February 1	N Rochester	96–80	George Yardley (23)	24–23
48	February 2	@ Rochester	79–93	George Yardley (24)	24–24
49	February 3	@ Syracuse	95–104	George Yardley (33)	24–25
50	February 4	Philadelphia	91–103	Bob Houbregs (19)	25–25
51	February 6	@ Boston	93–108	George Yardley (23)	25–26
52	February 9	@ Minneapolis	92–99	Gene Shue (17)	25–27
53	February 10	Minneapolis	100–113	George Yardley (29)	26–27
54	February 13	@ Philadelphia	89–99	Larry Foust (18)	26–28
55	February 14	Boston	106–112	Gene Shue (28)	27–28
56	February 16	@ Rochester	87–84	Larry Foust (22)	28–28
57	February 17	Rochester	85–104	George Yardley (22)	29–28
58	February 19	@ St. Louis	83–96	George Yardley (23)	29–29
59	February 21	N New York	114–120	Mel Hutchins (24)	30–29
60	February 22	N Rochester	105–110	George Yardley (33)	31–29
61	February 23	@ New York	94–102	George Yardley (21)	31–30
62	February 24	@ Minneapolis	115–123	George Yardley (28)	31–31
63	February 25	Syracuse	102–108	George Yardley (35)	32–31
64	February 27	@ Rochester	76–90	George Yardley (18)	32–32
65	February 28	@ Syracuse	112–123	George Yardley (31)	32–33
66	March 3	St. Louis	112–102	George Yardley (28)	32–34
67	March 5	N Philadelphia	114–80	George Yardley (17)	32–35
68	March 7	@ Philadelphia	100–114	Larry Foust (19)	32–36
69	March 8	Minneapolis	101–97	George Yardley (31)	32–37
70	March 9	@ St. Louis	96–97	Mel Hutchins (21)	32–38
71	March 10	Rochester	96–100	George Yardley (32)	33–38
72	March 13	Syracuse	81–114	Chuck Noble (20)	34–38

== Playoffs ==
1957 playoff game log
Division Tiebreaker (finishes as West's #3 seed)

Game	Date	Team	Score	High points	High rebounds	Location	Record
1	March 14	@ St. Louis	L 103–115	George Yardley (26)	Hutchins, Foust (10)	Kiel Auditorium	0–1

Division Semifinals: 0–2 (home: 0–1; road: 0–1)

Game	Date	Team	Score	High points	Location	Series
1	March 17	@ Minneapolis	L 127–131	George Yardley (34)	Minneapolis Auditorium	0–1
2	March 19	Minneapolis	L 108–110	Larry Foust (30)	War Memorial Coliseum	0–2

1957 schedule

== Awards and records ==
- George Yardley, All-NBA Second Team
