= 1961–62 St. Louis Hawks season =

NBA professional basketball team season

- Head coach: Paul Seymour; Andrew Levane; Bob Pettit
- Arena: Kiel Auditorium

Results
- Record: 29–51 (.363)
- Place: Division: 4th (Western)
- Playoff finish: Did not qualify
- Stats at Basketball Reference

Local media
- Television: KPLR-TV
- Radio: KMOX

The 1961–62 St. Louis Hawks season was the Hawks' 13th season in the NBA and seventh season in St. Louis.

== Regular season ==
=== Season standings ===
Western Division	W	L	PCT	GB	Home	Road	Neutral	Div
x-Los Angeles Lakers	54	26	.675	–	26–5	18–13	10–8	33–13
x-Cincinnati Royals	43	37	.538	11	18–13	14–16	11–8	29–17
x-Detroit Pistons	37	43	.463	17	16–14	8–17	13–12	24–22
St. Louis Hawks	29	51	.363	25	19–16	7–27	3–8	16–30
Chicago Packers	18	62	.225	36	15-23	3-39	0–0	10–30

x – clinched playoff spot

=== Game log ===
1961–62 Game log
#	Date	Opponent	Score	High points	Record
1	October 21	Cincinnati	138–129	Cliff Hagan (30)	0–1
2	October 24	@ New York	110–112	Bob Pettit (27)	0–2
3	October 26	N Syracuse	107–110	Clyde Lovellette (28)	1–2
4	October 27	@ Chicago	106–117	Bob Pettit (34)	1–3
5	October 28	Chicago	95–122	Bob Pettit (34)	2–3
6	October 31	Syracuse	107–90	Clyde Lovellette (26)	2–4
7	November 3	@ Syracuse	106–94	Bob Pettit (33)	3–4
8	November 4	New York	111–112	Hagan, Pettit (26)	4–4
9	November 7	Los Angeles	127–110	Clyde Lovellette (32)	4–5
10	November 8	@ Los Angeles	118–124	Clyde Lovellette (33)	4–6
11	November 11	Detroit	119–132	Bob Pettit (27)	5–6
12	November 12	@ Cincinnati	126–136	Bob Pettit (25)	5–7
13	November 14	Boston	119–117	Bob Pettit (44)	5–8
14	November 15	@ Detroit	122–127	Cliff Hagan (30)	5–9
15	November 18	Cincinnati	133–136	Clyde Lovellette (31)	6–9
16	November 22	@ Boston	121–141	Bob Pettit (43)	6–10
17	November 23	Los Angeles	122–114	Bob Pettit (26)	6–11
18	November 24	N Detroit	135–142	Cliff Hagan (29)	6–12
19	November 25	Syracuse	108–141	Cliff Hagan (25)	7–12
20	November 28	Philadelphia	121–111	Bob Pettit (34)	7–13
21	December 1	Detroit	116–119	Cliff Hagan (29)	8–13
22	December 2	@ Detroit	109–118	Bob Pettit (40)	8–14
23	December 5	N Chicago	99–101	Bob Pettit (32)	8–15
24	December 6	@ Philadelphia	137–132	Bob Pettit (51)	9–15
25	December 8	@ Cincinnati	123–128	Bob Pettit (41)	9–16
26	December 9	New York	91–102	Bob Pettit (32)	10–16
27	December 11	@ Los Angeles	119–132	Clyde Lovellette (32)	10–17
28	December 13	@ Los Angeles	136–137 (OT)	Bob Pettit (49)	10–18
29	December 15	N New York	120–108	Cliff Hagan (31)	11–18
30	December 16	@ Boston	113–130	Bob Pettit (35)	11–19
31	December 19	@ New York	111–128	Bob Pettit (31)	11–20
32	December 23	Los Angeles	129–126	Cliff Hagan (38)	11–21
33	December 26	Cincinnati	129–118	Bob Pettit (35)	11–22
34	December 27	@ Cincinnati	117–142	Cliff Hagan (22)	11–23
35	December 28	Boston	117–109	Bob Pettit (37)	11–24
36	December 29	@ Chicago	120–103	Bob Pettit (32)	12–24
37	December 30	Chicago	92–101	Clyde Lovellette (31)	13–24
38	January 1	@ Detroit	145–139	Bob Pettit (49)	14–24
39	January 2	N Boston	99–136	Bob Pettit (36)	14–25
40	January 5	@ Philadelphia	116–134	Bob Pettit (34)	14–26
41	January 7	Philadelphia	112–137	Bob Pettit (30)	15–26
42	January 9	N Detroit	113–122	Cliff Hagan (30)	15–27
43	January 10	@ Syracuse	122–134	Bob Pettit (36)	15–28
44	January 12	N New York	126–128	Larry Foust (40)	15–29
45	January 13	Los Angeles	108–107	Bob Pettit (32)	15–30
46	January 14	@ Cincinnati	114–119	Bob Pettit (30)	15–31
47	January 17	N Philadelphia	130–136 (OT)	Bob Pettit (37)	15–32
48	January 19	@ Chicago	114–113	Pettit, Sims (27)	16–32
49	January 20	Chicago	112–116	Bob Pettit (36)	17–32
50	January 21	New York	113–124	Cliff Hagan (26)	18–32
51	January 23	Syracuse	107–115	Bob Pettit (34)	19–32
52	January 24	@ Boston	135–123	Bob Pettit (28)	20–32
53	January 26	N Philadelphia	110–136	Bob Pettit (37)	20–33
54	January 28	Detroit	97–110	Hagan, Pettit (23)	21–33
55	January 30	Cincinnati	131–121	Cliff Hagan (47)	21–34
56	February 2	N Syracuse	135–101	Fred LaCour (20)	21–35
57	February 3	Los Angeles	127–124	Bob Pettit (39)	21–36
58	February 4	@ Detroit	113–121	Bob Pettit (30)	21–37
59	February 6	Boston	129–114	Bob Pettit (37)	21–38
60	February 10	@ Cincinnati	118–134	Bob Pettit (34)	21–39
61	February 11	Cincinnati	109–129	Cliff Hagan (55)	22–39
62	February 12	@ Los Angeles	117–113	Bob Pettit (38)	23–39
63	February 14	@ Los Angeles	107–130	Bob Pettit (34)	23–40
64	February 17	Philadelphia	121–128	Barney Cable (29)	24–40
65	February 18	@ Detroit	112–119	Cliff Hagan (34)	24–41
66	February 20	@ Cincinnati	109–129	Cliff Hagan (25)	24–42
67	February 21	Detroit	126–123	Cliff Hagan (41)	24–43
68	February 22	@ Philadelphia	121–139	Cliff Hagan (37)	24–44
69	February 23	@ New York	118–130	Cliff Hagan (35)	24–45
70	February 24	@ Chicago	119–129	Bob Pettit (31)	24–46
71	February 27	Philadelphia	147–137	Bob Pettit (49)	24–47
72	March 2	Boston	120–138	Cliff Hagan (43)	25–47
73	March 3	Los Angeles	125–134	Cliff Hagan (40)	26–47
74	March 4	@ Boston	120–123	Bob Pettit (32)	26–48
75	March 7	@ Syracuse	126–129	Bob Pettit (48)	26–49
76	March 9	N Chicago	124–120	Bob Pettit (41)	27–49
77	March 10	Cincinnati	110–116	Cliff Hagan (30)	28–49
78	March 11	Detroit	123–126	Cliff Hagan (35)	29–49
79	March 13	Chicago	124–118	Bob Pettit (36)	29–50
80	March 14	@ Los Angeles	115–125	Bob Pettit (36)	29–51

== Awards and records ==
- Bob Pettit, All-NBA First Team
