= Mel Hutchins =

American basketball player (1928–2018)

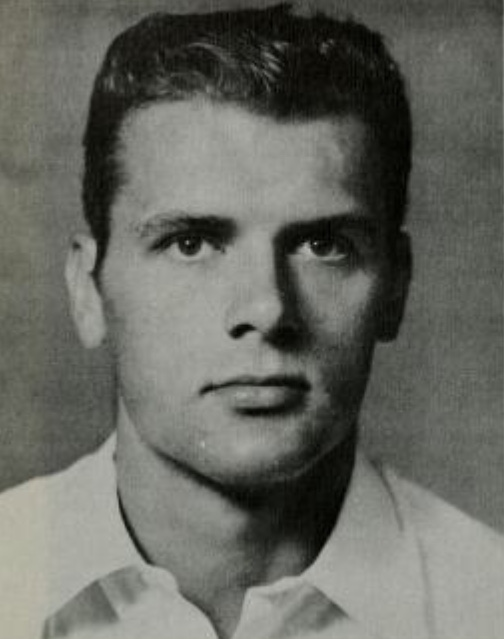
- Hutchins from the 1951 Banyan

Personal information
- Born: November 22, 1928 Sacramento, California, U.S.
- Died: December 19, 2018 (aged 90) Encinitas, California, U.S.
- Listed height: 6 ft 6 in (1.98 m)
- Listed weight: 200 lb (91 kg)

Career information
- High school: Monrovia (Monrovia, California)
- College: BYU (1947–1948, 1949–1951)
- NBA draft: 1951: 1st round, 2nd overall pick
- Drafted by: Tri-Cities Blackhawks
- Playing career: 1951–1958
- Position: Power forward / center
- Number: 14, 2, 9, 4, 10

Career history
- 1951–1953: Milwaukee Hawks
- 1953–1957: Fort Wayne Pistons
- 1957–1958: New York Knicks

Career highlights
- 4× NBA All-Star (1953, 1954, 1956, 1957); NBA rebounding leader (1952); NBA Rookie of the Year (Newspaper Writers) (1952); NIT champion (1951); Consensus second-team All-American (1951); No. 14 retired by BYU Cougars

Career NBA statistics
- Points: 4,851 (11.1 ppg)
- Rebounds: 4,186 (9.6 rpg)
- Assists: 1,298 (3.0 apg)
- Stats at NBA.com
- Stats at Basketball Reference

Melvin Ray Hutchins (November 22, 1928 – December 19, 2018) was an American basketball player. He played professionally in the National Basketball Association (NBA) from 1951 to 1958. Hutchins was selected by the Tri-Cities Blackhawks with the second pick in the 1951 NBA draft and was a four-time NBA All-Star.

== Early life ==
Hutchins was born in Sacramento, California, and attended high school at Monrovia High School in Monrovia, California.

== College career ==
A 6 ft 6 in (1.98 m) power forward–center, Hutchins attended Brigham Young University in 1946–47 and 1947–48 as a freshman and sophomore, playing for coach Floyd Millet. After a one-year absence where he worked in Southern California, he returned to BYU in 1949–50 and 1950–51. As a senior, he led BYU to the 1951 NIT National Championship.

In 1950–1951, Hutchins averaged 15.4 points and 12.7 rebounds, as BYU finished 22–9 under coach Stan Watts. His 471 rebounds that season remain a BYU record.

At the conclusion of the 1951 season, Hutchins played in the annual East-West College All-Star game, where he was named MVP after leading the West to victory.

== Professional career ==
Hutchins was selected by the Tri-Cities Blackhawks (later, the Milwaukee Hawks) with the second pick in the 1951 NBA draft. The first overall pick, Gene Melchiorre (Baltimore Bullets), received a lifetime ban from the NBA for gambling, therefore Hutchins was given a $7,000 bonus that was awarded to the top pick in the NBA Draft.

In 1952, as a rookie, Hutchins was the co-leader of the NBA in total rebounds with 880, averaging 13.3 rebounds per game, which is on the List of National Basketball Association rookie single-season rebounding leaders. As of 2018, Hutchins and Wilt Chamberlain are the only rookies in NBA history to lead the league in total rebounds. Hutchins and Bill Tosheff were named co-NBA Rookie of the Year by newspaper writers—a designation not currently recognized by the NBA, although it has appeared in the official NBA record book as recently as 1998.

Hutchins helped lead the Pistons to back-to-back NBA Finals in 1955 and 1956. During his career, Hutchins appeared in four NBA All-Star Games, (1953, 1954, 1956, and 1957), and finished fourth in MVP voting in 1956. He played for the Milwaukee Hawks, Fort Wayne Pistons, and New York Knicks.

Along with being one of the top rebounders in the NBA, Hutchins was renowned for his defense. During his Hall of Fame induction speech in August 2011, Satch Sanders said that Hutchins was one of the great defenders who inspired him to play defense at a high level: "He (Hutchins) was so smooth defensively, always in the right place", Sanders told CSNNE.com moments after delivering his acceptance speech. "I thought to myself, 'I sure hope one day I can play like that.'"

Hutchins suffered a severe knee injury that forced his retirement in 1958.

For his NBA career, he averaged a near double-double of 11.2 points, 9.6 rebounds and 3.0 assists over 437 games, totaling 4,851 career points and 4,186 career rebounds in seven seasons.

== Personal life ==
Hutchins is the brother of 1952 Miss America winner Colleen Kay Hutchins. Hutchins' brother-in-law was NBA player Ernie Vandeweghe, the father of former two-time NBA All Star Kiki Vandeweghe.

An avid golfer, Hutchins gained recognition in amateur golf in northern California.

Following his NBA career, Hutchins worked in real estate.

Hutchins was married to the former Lorene Hardy, who died in 2010, with whom he had four children. Hutchins died on December 19, 2018, in Encinitas, California, at the age of 90.

== Honors ==
- In 1976, Hutchins was inducted into the Brigham Young University Athletics Hall of Fame.
- Hutchins was inducted into the Sacramento Sports Hall of Fame.
- On February 16, 2013, Hutchins and his BYU teammate Roland Minson had their jerseys retired during a ceremony at half-time of a BYU and University of Portland basketball game.

== NBA career statistics ==
Legend
GP	Games played	GS	Games started	MPG	Minutes per game
FG%	Field goal percentage	3P%	3-point field goal percentage	FT%	Free throw percentage
RPG	Rebounds per game	APG	Assists per game	SPG	Steals per game
BPG	Blocks per game	PPG	Points per game	**Bold**	Career high
*	Led the league

=== Regular season ===
Year	Team	GP	MPG	FG%	FT%	RPG	APG	PPG
1951–52	Milwaukee	66	39.7	.365	.644	**13.3***	2.9	9.2
1952–53	Milwaukee	71	40.7	.379	.654	11.2	3.2	11.7
1953–54	Fort Wayne	**72**	**40.8**	.401	.677	9.7	2.9	10.3
1954–55	Fort Wayne	**72**	39.7	.378	.708	9.2	**3.4**	12.0
1955–56	Fort Wayne	66	33.9	**.425**	.643	7.5	2.7	12.0
1956–57	Fort Wayne	**72**	36.8	.387	**.738**	7.9	2.9	**12.4**
1957–58	New York	18	21.3	.389	.558	4.8	1.9	7.0
Career		437	37.9	.389	.673	9.6	3.0	11.1
All-Star		4	28.5	.282	.500	5.3	1.8	6.5

=== Playoffs ===
Year	Team	GP	MPG	FG%	FT%	RPG	APG	PPG
1954	Fort Wayne	4	**40.5**	.326	.706	9.3	1.5	10.5
1955	Fort Wayne	**11**	37.9	**.417**	.679	8.1	2.8	**14.4**
1956	Fort Wayne	10	37.7	.304	.610	8.8	2.3	9.3
1957	Fort Wayne	2	34.0	.300	**.714**	**11.5**	**5.0**	11.5
Career		27	37.9	.355	.661	8.8	2.6	11.7

== See also ==
- List of National Basketball Association annual rebounding leaders
