= Philadelphia Convention Hall and Civic Center =

Indoor arena in Pennsylvania

Philadelphia Civic Center
- "The Nation's Most Historic Arena"
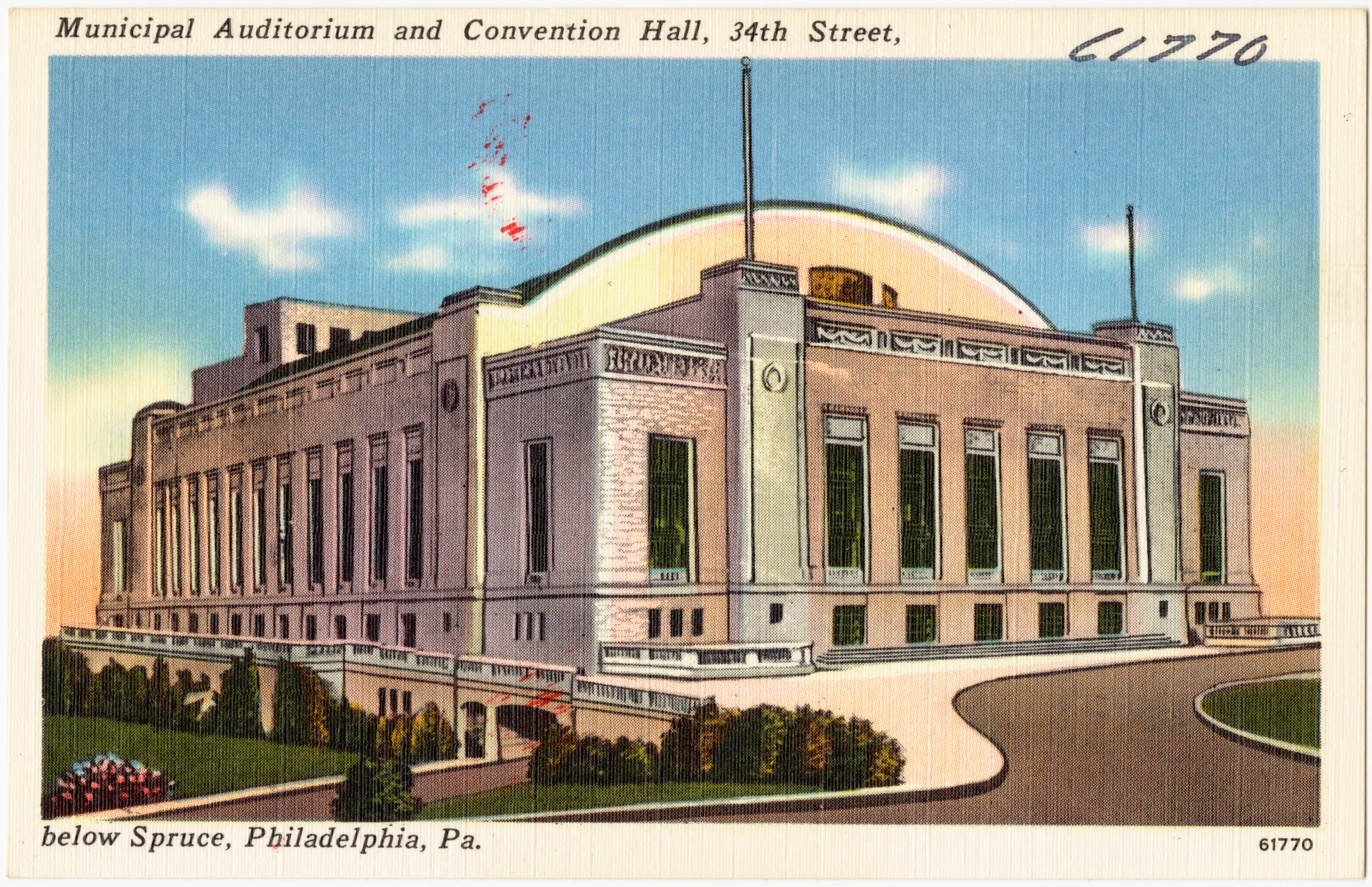
- Interactive map of Philadelphia Civic Center
- Former names: Municipal Auditorium; Philadelphia Convention Hall
- Address: 3400 Civic Center Boulevard
- Location: Philadelphia, Pennsylvania, U.S.
- Coordinates: 39.947368°N 75.195043°W
- Capacity: Basketball: 9,600; Concerts: 12,037 (The Beatles 1964); Convention: 15,000

Construction
- Opened: 1931
- Closed: 1996
- Demolished: 2005
- Cost: $5.3 million ($112 million in 2025 dollars)
- Architect: Philip H. Johnson

Tenants
- Temple Owls (NCAA) (1938–1955); Philadelphia Warriors (NBA) (1952–1962); Philadelphia Tapers (ABL) (1962); Philadelphia 76ers (NBA) (1963–1967); Philadelphia Blazers (WHA) (1972–1973); Philadelphia Firebirds (NAHL/AHL) (1974–1979); La Salle Explorers (NCAA) (1989–1996)

The Philadelphia Convention Hall and Civic Center, commonly known simply as the Philadelphia Civic Center, was a convention center complex located in Philadelphia, Pennsylvania, United States. It developed out of a series of buildings dedicated to expanding trade which began with the National Export Exhibition in 1899. The two most significant buildings in the complex were the original main exhibition hall built in 1899, which later housed the Philadelphia Commercial Museum, and the Municipal Auditorium, later called the Convention Hall, which was built in 1931 to the designs of architect Philip H. Johnson. The site was host to national political conventions in 1900, 1936, 1940 and 1948.

== Location ==
The Convention Hall arena was located at 3400 Civic Center Boulevard, on the edge of the campus of the University of Pennsylvania, and just to the southwest of Franklin Field. It was built in 1930 and its highest capacity was approximately 12,000. The building was an Art Deco landmark, notable for its many friezes and other decorative aspects.

== Arena history ==
=== 1930–1966 ===
Originally known as the Municipal Auditorium, the arena hosted many events, including the 1936 and 1948 Democratic National Conventions, and the 1940 and 1948 Republican National Conventions. Thus the building became known as Convention Hall. Martin Luther King Jr. spoke there, and The Beatles, The Grateful Dead (twice in August 1974, and three times in April 1984) and the Philadelphia Mummers each performed there. The Philadelphia Warriors and Philadelphia 76ers both played many of their games in the arena; the 1960 NBA All-Star Game was played there.

President Lyndon B. Johnson spoke at a campaign appearance on October 29, 1964, at Convention Hall. He appeared at the Hall alongside many notable Philadelphia and Pennsylvania Democratic leaders. Four days later, The Beatles played the venue on September 2, 1964, during their first tour of the United States. Tickets went on sale in May 1964 and sold out within 90 minutes. The Rolling Stones played Convention Hall on May 1, 1965, during their third American tour.

=== 1967–2005 ===
After the Spectrum opened in 1967, the Civic Center continued on as an alternate venue to the larger arena for events requiring less seating or overall space. On February 5, 1970, The Jackson 5 played their first official concert for Motown Records there. The Grateful Dead played there for 2 nights in August 1974, and 3 consecutive nights in April 1984; portions of the 1974 shows were officially released on Dick's Picks Volume 31. The whole concert from the April 20th, 1984 show, and about half of the show from the 19th, were officially released on Dave's Picks Volume 35. The building was later used for Atlantic 10 Conference and Big Five basketball games. Jim Crockett Promotions, under the NWA banner, and later the Ted Turner-owned WCW, also staged professional wrestling there, which included three pay-per-view events: Halloween Havoc in 1989 and 1992 and the 1994 Slamboree event. The Civic Center also hosted the World Hockey Association's Philadelphia Blazers and the minor-league Philadelphia Firebirds hockey teams. The University of Pennsylvania used the building for commencements (due to it being larger than Penn's own basketball arena, the nearby Palestra), as did Drexel University, Temple University, St. Joseph's University, and La Salle University. Pope John Paul II and Nelson Mandela both spoke there.

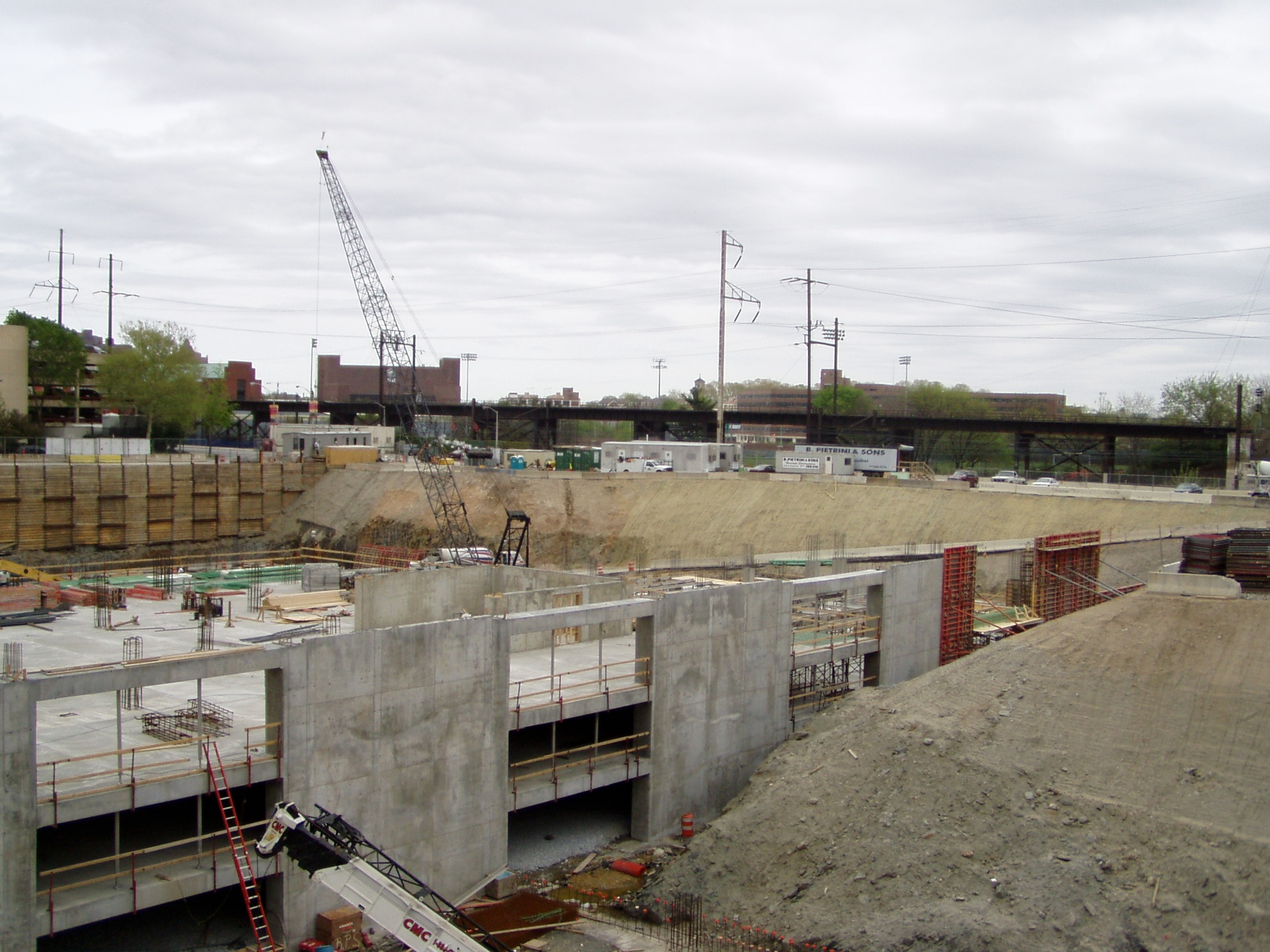
Foundations of the Perelman Center for Advanced Medicine being built after the demolition of the Philadelphia Civic Center

Convention Hall was torn down in 2005, after more than a decade without a regular tenant. The 1996 Atlantic 10 Men's basketball tournament was the last event ever held there (its convention functions were taken over by the Pennsylvania Convention Center in the city's central business district); prior to this, it also hosted college basketball in the form of the 1986 MEAC men's basketball tournament. Afterwards, it served as a soundstage for movies and the TV series Hack starring David Morse. The civic center was used as a sound stage for Beloved in 1988. The championship fight scenes in the 1990 movie Rocky V was shot there.

The auditorium's M.P. Moller 86-rank pipe organ, built in 1931, was removed just prior to the building's demolition and placed in Pennsylvania Hall in temporary storage. In October 2006 the organ was donated to the University of Oklahoma's American Organ Institute, where it was partially installed into the Sharp Hall. The institute, however, was disbanded in 2019, and the uninstalled pipework was sold.

The last remnant of the Civic Center, Pennsylvania Hall (built in 1978), was imploded on March 4, 2007. The University of Pennsylvania Health System's Perelman Center for Advanced Medicine opened on the site in October 2008.

One limestone frieze that adorned the Civic Center, 5 feet (1.5 m) tall and 48 feet (15 m) long and depicting the history of labor from the days of the ancient Egyptians to the 20th century, was carefully removed before the building was demolished. It was purchased by the Alessi Organization in 2005 and in 2017 was installed outside its new Crossing Shopping Center at East 22nd Street and Route 440 in Bayonne, New Jersey.
