= List of Illinois Fighting Illini in the NBA draft =

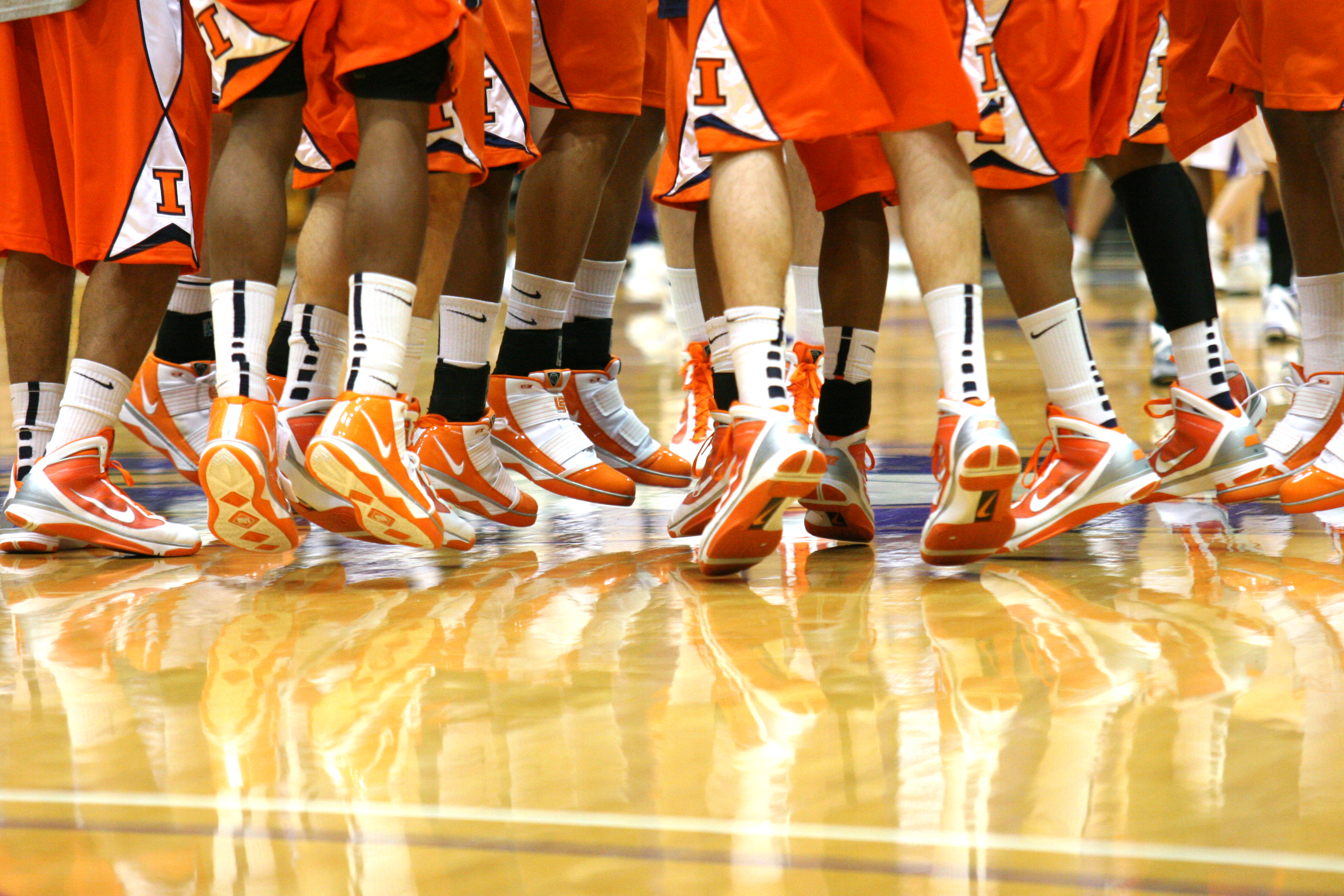
The Fighting Illini during a warm-up

The Illinois Fighting Illini men's basketball team, representing the University of Illinois at Urbana–Champaign, has had 81 players drafted into the National Basketball Association (NBA) since the league began holding the yearly event in 1947, 74 with Illinois as their final school (and thus their official association) and seven having attended a school after Illinois. To be eligible for the NBA draft, a player in the United States must be at least 19 years old during the calendar year of the draft and must be at least one year removed from the graduation of his high school class.

The drafts held between 1947 and 1949 were held by the Basketball Association of America (BAA). The BAA became the National Basketball Association after absorbing teams from the National Basketball League in the fall of 1949. Official NBA publications include the BAA Drafts as part of the NBA's draft history. From 1967 until the ABA–NBA merger in 1976, the American Basketball Association (ABA) held its own draft.

Through the 2026 NBA draft, a Fighting Illini has been chosen first round of the draft 20 times in the history of the event.

== Key ==
G	Guard	F	Forward	C	Center

*	Selected to an NBA/ABA All-Star Game
†	Won an NBA/ABA championship
‡	Selected to an All-Star Game and won an NBA/ABA championship
(2)	Player was selected a second time
#	Player attended a school after Illinois

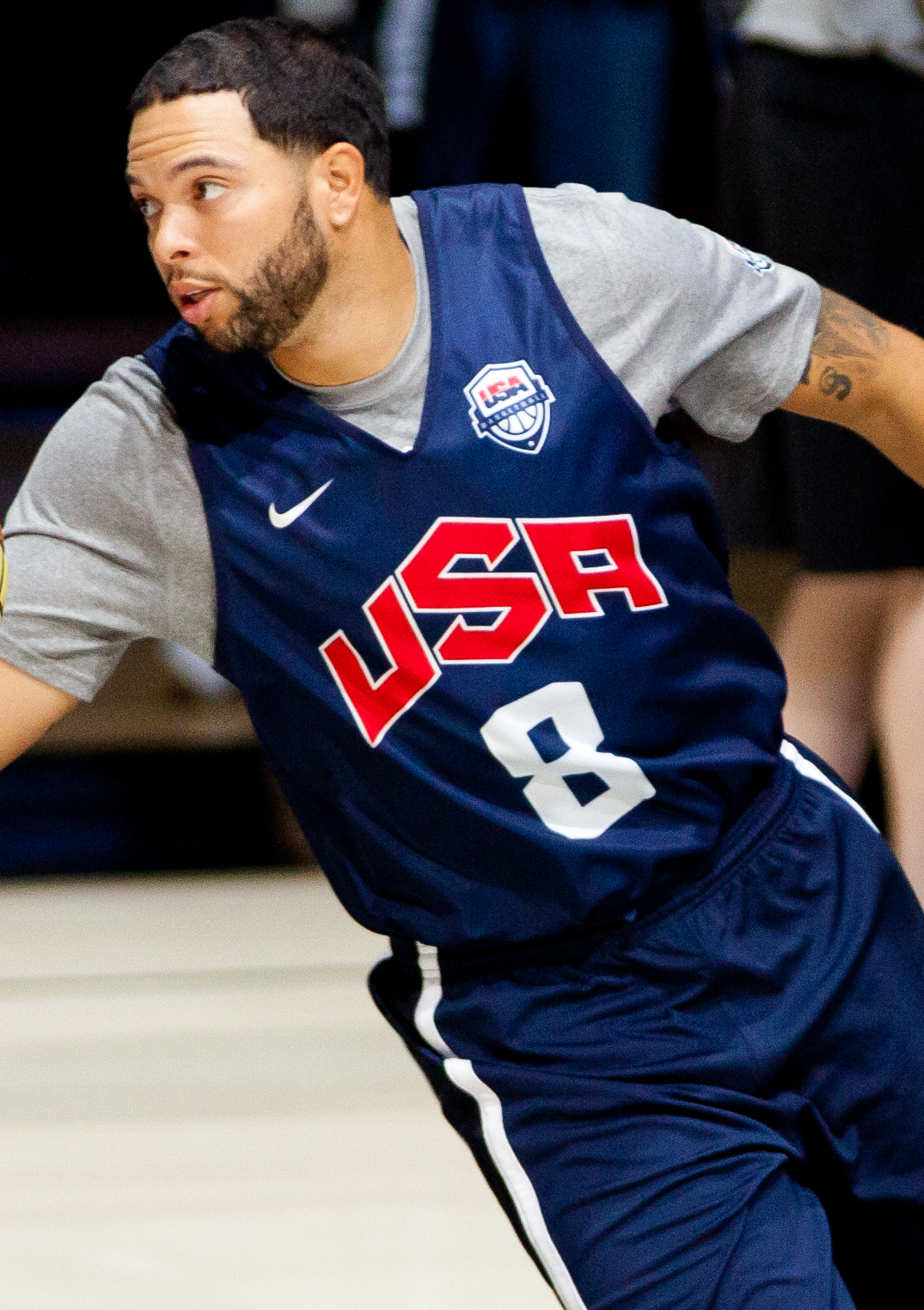
Deron Williams was drafted third overall by the Utah Jazz in 2005.

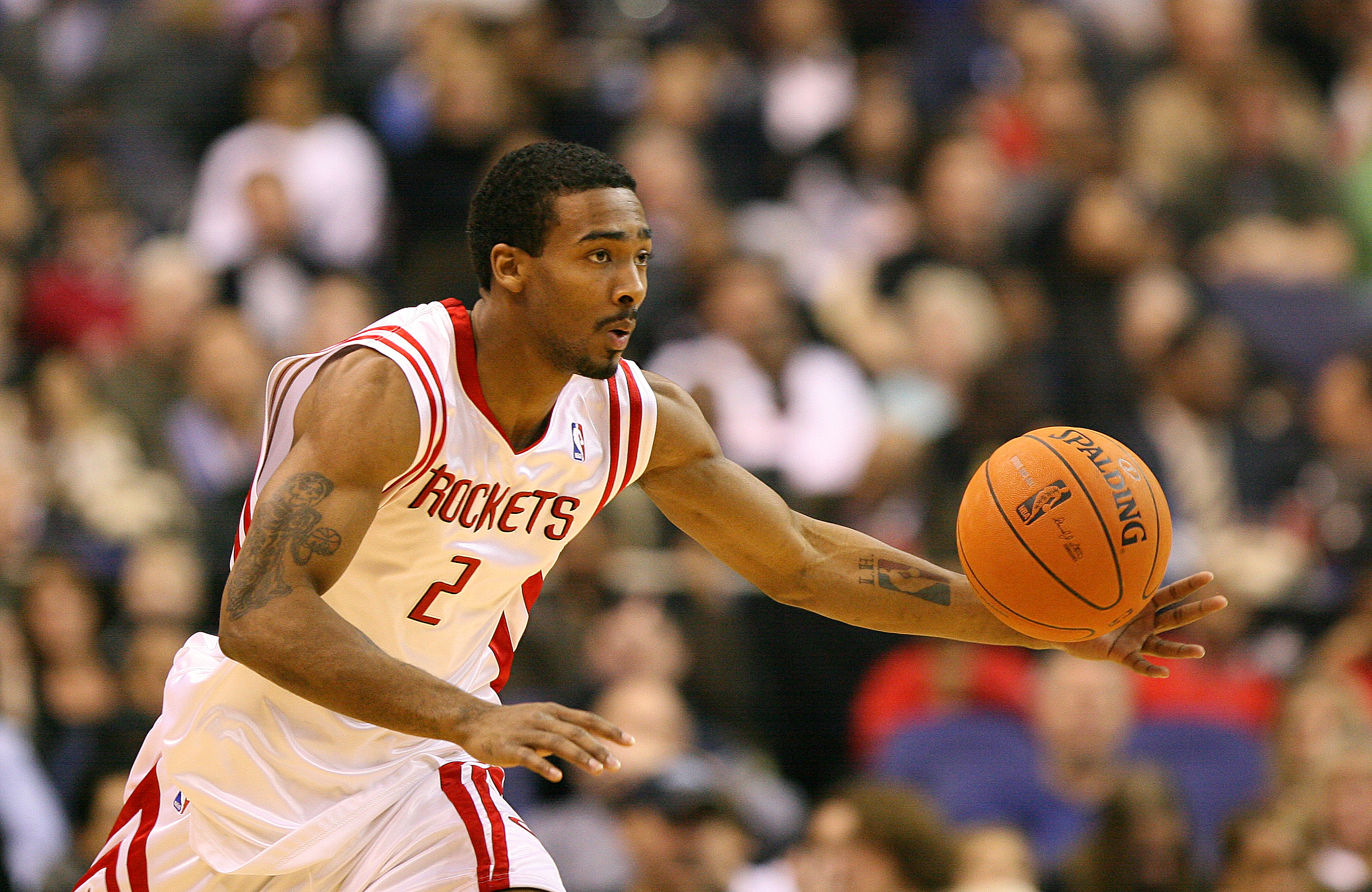
Luther Head was drafted 24th overall by the Houston Rockets in 2005.

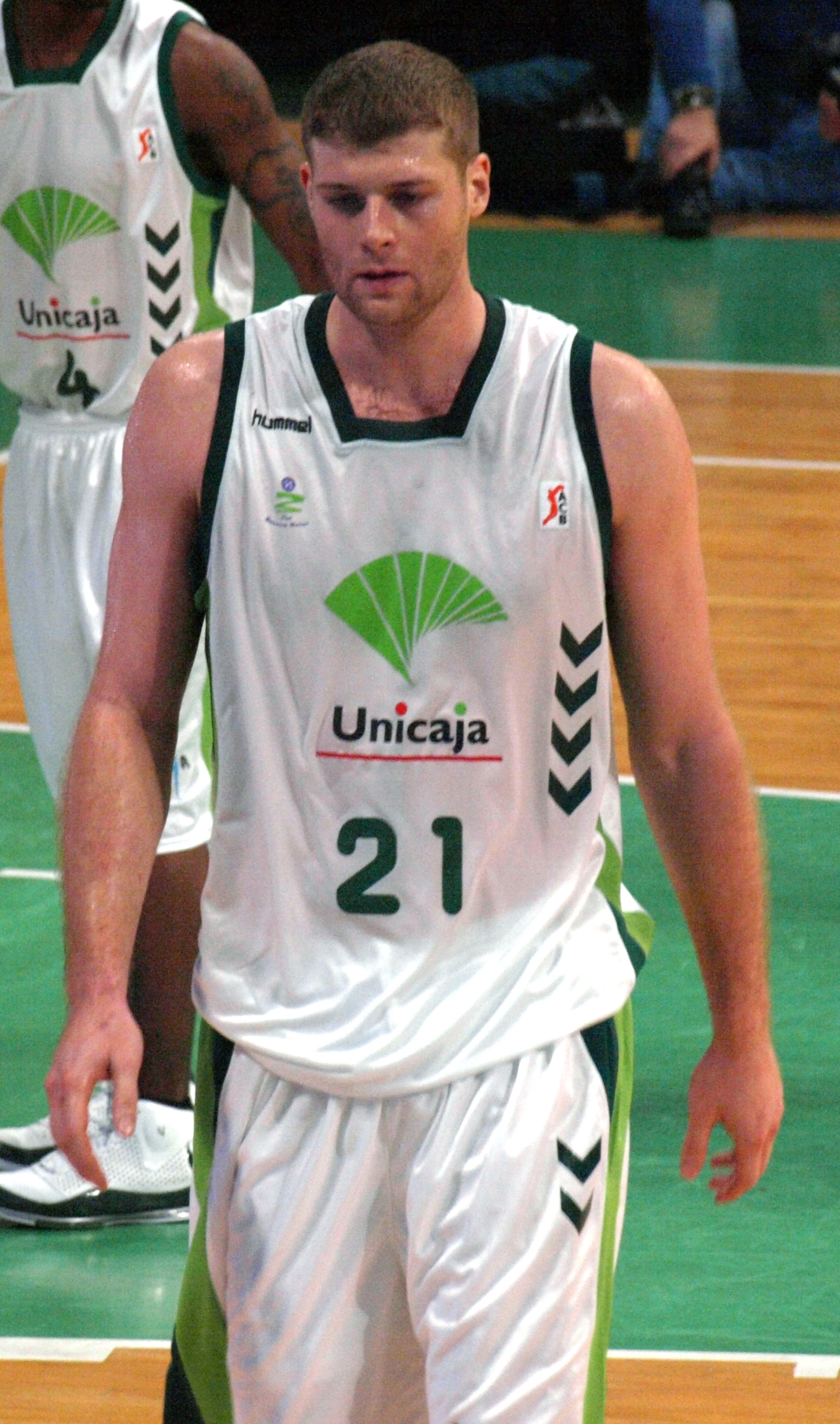
Robert Archibald was drafted 32nd overall in 2002 by the Memphis Grizzlies.

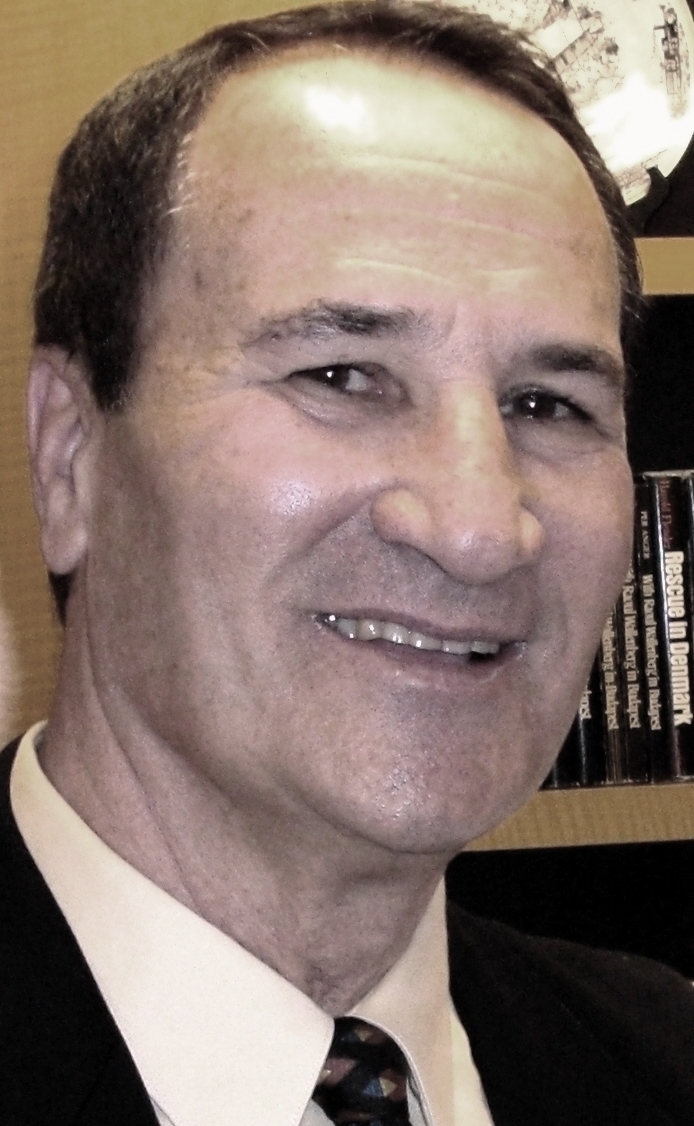
Tal Brody was drafted in the third round of the 1965 draft by the Baltimore Bullets, but instead chose to play in Israel for Maccabi Tel Aviv.

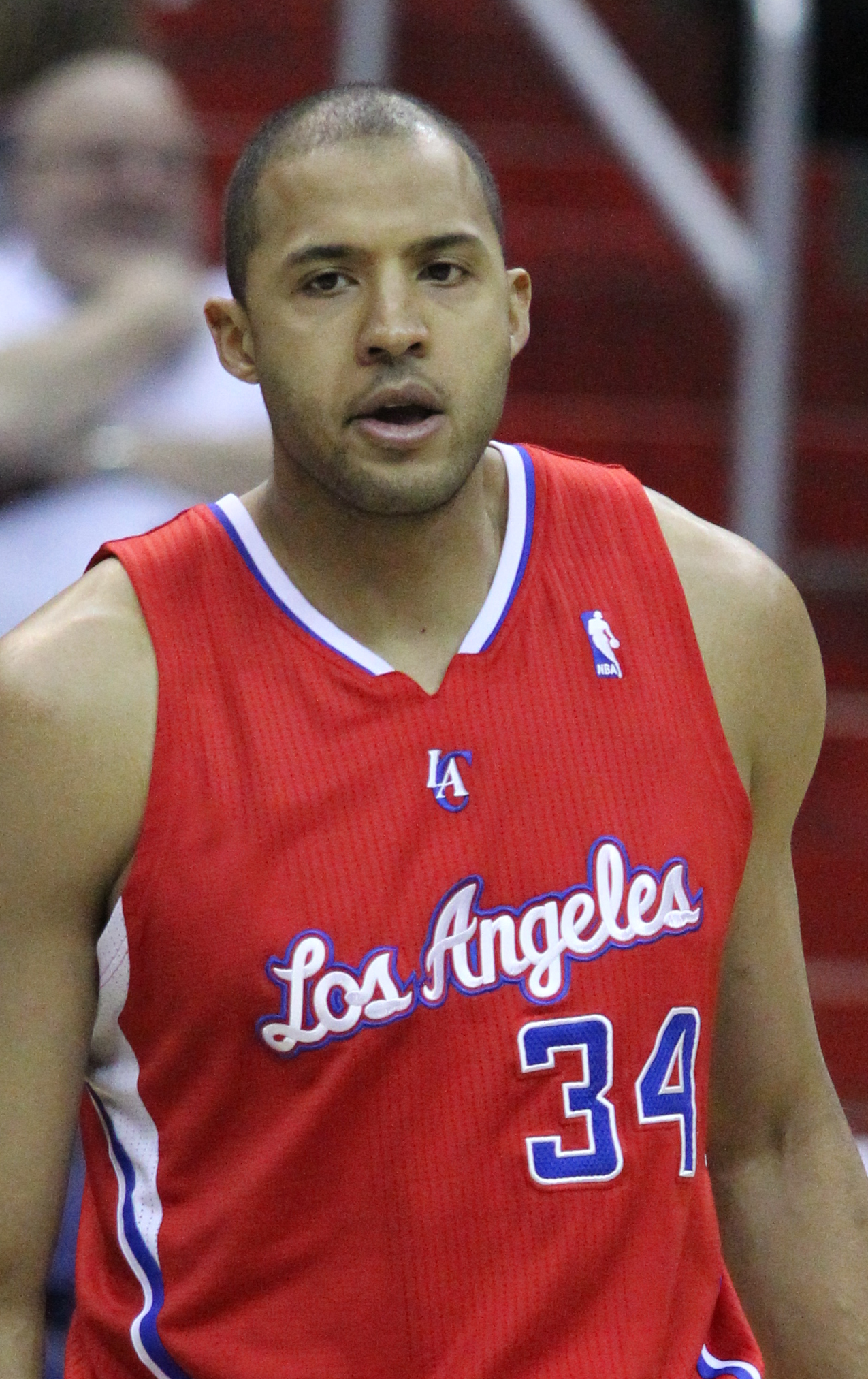
Brian Cook was drafted by the Los Angeles Lakers 24th overall in 2003.

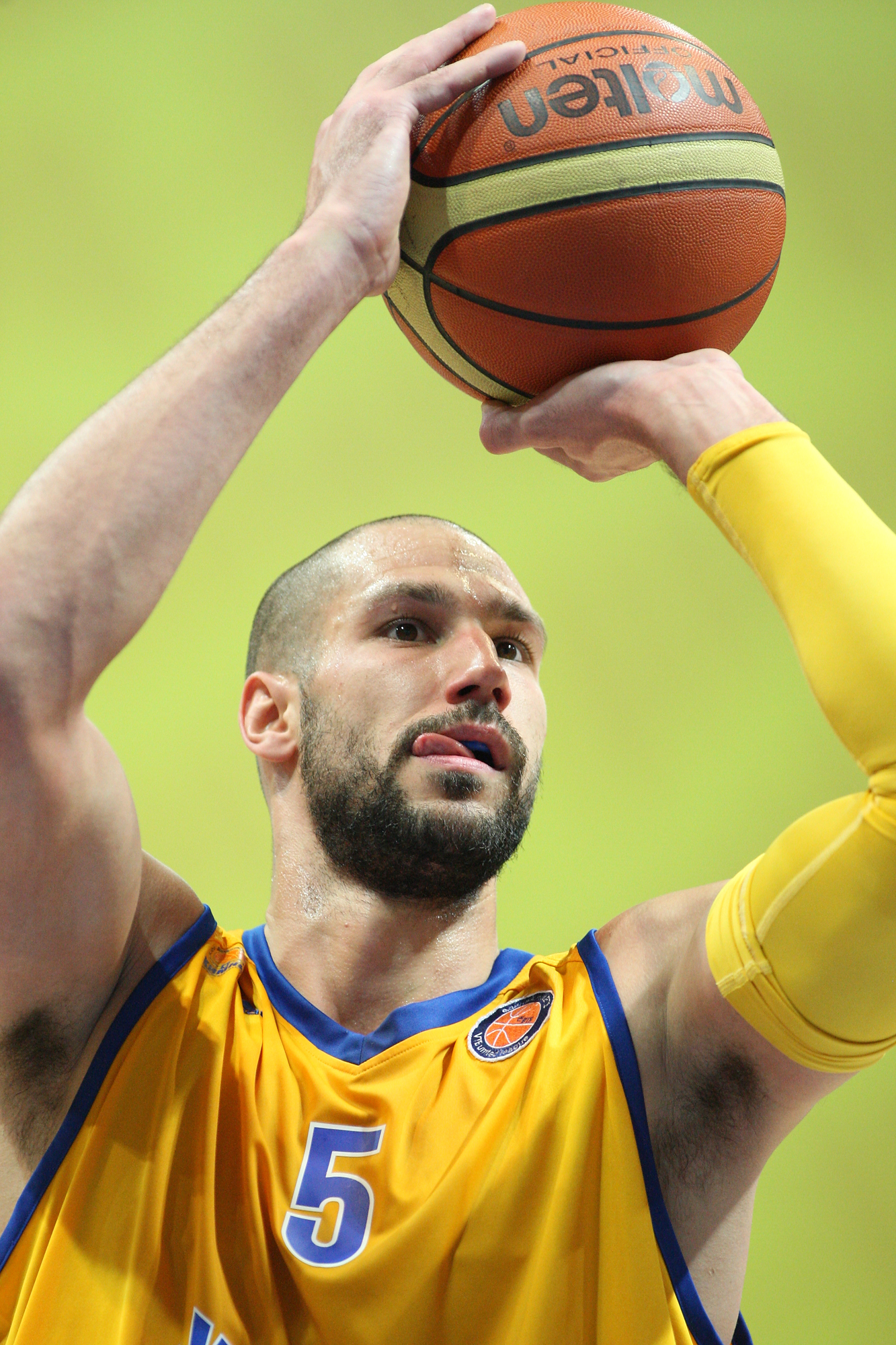
James Augustine was drafted in the second round of the 2006 draft by the Orlando Magic.

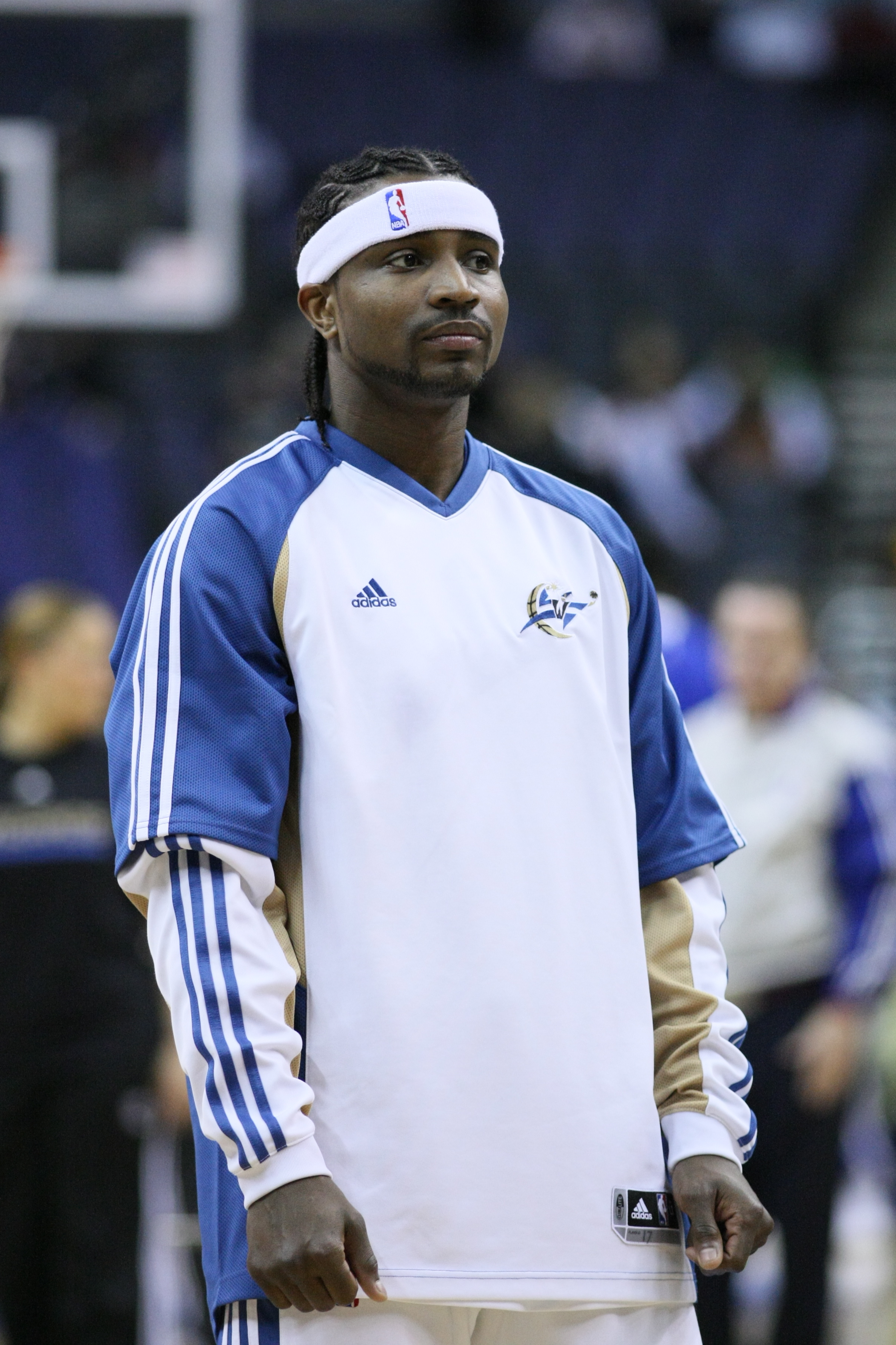
Dee Brown was drafted in the second round of the 2006 draft by the Utah Jazz.

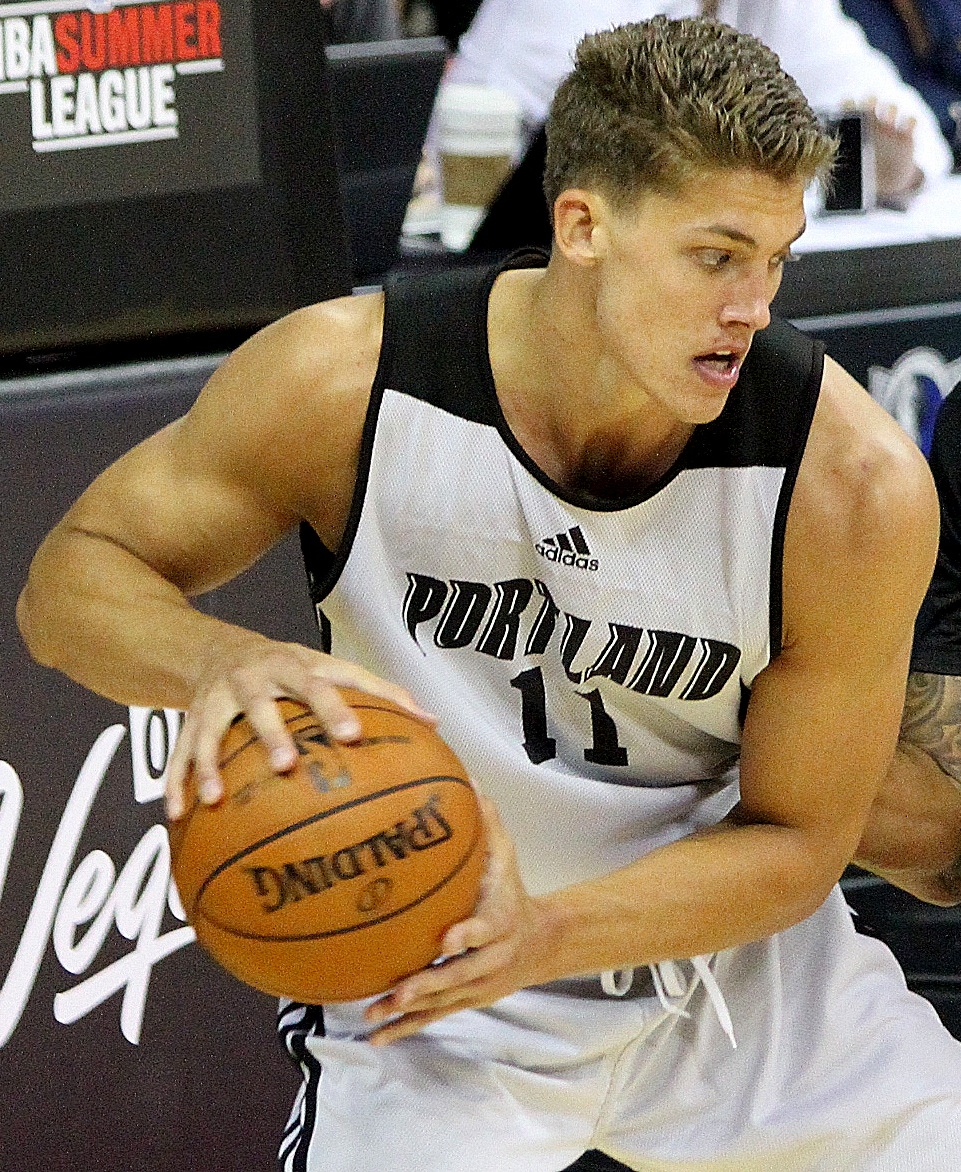
Meyers Leonard was drafted 11th overall in 2012 by the Portland Trail Blazers.

== Players selected in the BAA and NBA drafts ==
Illinois Fighting Illini players drafted
Year	League	Round	Pick	Overall	Name	Position	Team	Notes
1947	BAA	5	—	47	Andy Phillip^{‡}	G	Chicago Stags	Naismith Memorial Basketball Hall of Fame Inductee (1961); NBA Champion (1957); NBA All-Star (1951, 1952, 1953, 1954, 1955)
1947	BAA	4	—	38	Gene Vance	G, F	Chicago Stags	—
1948	BAA	2	—	19	Jack Burmaster	G	St. Louis Bombers	—
1948	BAA	2	—	21	Johnny Orr #	F	Minneapolis Lakers	—
1949	BAA	3	10	34	Dike Eddleman^{*}	F	Chicago Stags	NBA All-Star (1951, 1952)
1949	BAA	2	—	20	Johnny Orr # (2)	F	St. Louis Bombers	—
1950	NBA	7	—	83	Bill Erickson	G	Tri-Cities Blackhawks	—
1950	NBA	2	—	18	Wally Osterkorn^{†}	F, C	Chicago Stags	NBA Champion (1955)
1951	NBA	1	9	9	Don Sunderlage^{*}	G	Philadelphia Warriors	NBA All-Star (1954)
1951	NBA	7	3	62	Ted Beach	F	Indianapolis Olympians	—
1952	NBA	6	—	60	Rod Fletcher	G	Minneapolis Lakers	—
1953	NBA	3	—	19	Irv Bemoras	G, F	Milwaukee Hawks	—
1953	NBA	3	—	20	Jim Bredar	G	Ft. Wayne Pistons	—
1954	NBA	1	6	6	Johnny Kerr^{‡}	C, F	Syracuse Nationals	NBA Champion (1955); NBA All-Star (1956, 1959, 1963); NBA Coach of the Year (1967)
1956	NBA	2	—	12	Paul Judson	G	Syracuse Nationals	—
1957	NBA	1	7	7	George Bon Salle	F	Syracuse Nationals	
1957	NBA	2	3	11	Harv Schmidt	F	Minneapolis Lakers	
1958	NBA	5	5	36	Don Ohl^{*}	G	Philadelphia Warriors	NBA All-Star (1963, 1964, 1965), 1966), 1967)
1959	NBA	5	5	35	Roger Taylor	G	Syracuse Nationals	—
1961	NBA	8	8	76	John Wessels	C	Chicago Packers	-
1963	NBA	3	6	23	Bill Burwell	G	St. Louis Hawks	—
1963	NBA	4	3	29	Dave Downey	F	San Francisco Warriors	-
1963	NBA	5	4	39	Bill Small	G	Detroit Pistons	—
1965	NBA	2	4	12	Tal Brody	G	Baltimore Bullets	
1965	NBA	4	4	30	Skip Thoren	C	Baltimore Bullets	—
1965	NBA	10	2	76	Bogie Redmon	F	Baltimore Bullets	—
1965	NBA	17	1	109	Roger Taylor (2)	G	Baltimore Bullets	—
1966	NBA	3	9	29	Donnie Freeman^{‡}	G	Philadelphia 76ers	ABA Champion (1973); ABA All-Star (1968, 1969, 1970, 1971, 1972); All-ABA First Team (1972)
1967	NBA	16	2	154	Jim Dawson	G	Chicago Bulls	—
1968	NBA	2	5	19	Ron Dunlap	C	Chicago Bulls	-
1968	NBA	4	13	49	Rich Jones^{†} #	F, C	Phoenix Suns	ABA Champion (1976)
1969	NBA	4	9	52	Steve Kuberski^{†} #	F/C	Boston Celtics	NBA Champion (1974, 1976)
1969	NBA	4	13	56	Dave Scholz	F	Philadelphia 76ers	
1969	NBA	5	1	58	Rich Jones^{†} (2) #	F, C	Phoenix Suns	ABA Champion (1976)
1969	NBA	15	6	194	Jodie Harrison	G	Baltimore Bullets	—
1970	NBA	1	17	17	Mike Price	G	New York Knicks	—
1971	NBA	9	16	152	Rick Howat	G	Milwaukee Bucks	—
1973	NBA	1	13	13	Nick Weatherspoon	F	Capital Bullets	NBA All-Rookie First Team (1974)
1973	NBA	8	11	131	Jeff Dawson	G	Golden State Warriors	—
1973	NBA	10	2	153	Nick Connor	F, C	Buffalo Braves	-
1974	NBA	9	6	150	Jeff Dawson (2)	G	Kansas City-Omaha Kings	—
1975	NBA	6	1	91	Rick Schmidt	F	New Orleans Jazz	—
1976	NBA	5	1	69	Nate Williams	G	Chicago Bulls	
1976	NBA	10	15	172	Otho Tucker	G	Boston Celtics	—
1978	NBA	4	20	86	Rich Adams	F	San Antonio Spurs	-
1978	NBA	6	7	117	Audie Matthews	F	Detroit Pistons	—
1978	NBA	6	2	117	Neil Bresnahan	F	Golden State Warriors	—
1981	NBA	2	7	29	Eddie Johnson	F	Kansas City Kings	NBA Sixth Man of the Year (1989)
1981	NBA	3	4	50	Derek Holcomb	C	Portland Trail Blazers	—
1981	NBA	3	21	67	Mark Smith	F	Milwaukee Bucks	—
1982	NBA	3	11	57	Craig Tucker	G	New York Knicks	-
1982	NBA	4	11	80	James Griffin	C	New Jersey Nets	—
1982	NBA	7	5	143	Perry Range	G	Kansas City Kings	—
1982	NBA	8	20	181	Bryan Leonard	F	Milwaukee Bucks	—
1983	NBA	1	11	11	Derek Harper	G	Dallas Mavericks	NBA All-Defensive Second Team (1987, 1990)
1985	NBA	2	15	39	George Montgomery	C	Portland Trail Blazers	-
1986	NBA	3	10	57	Bruce Douglas	G	Sacramento Kings	-
1986	NBA	3	15	62	Anthony Welch	F	Dallas Mavericks	-
1986	NBA	4	4	74	Scott Meents	F	Chicago Bulls	—
1986	NBA	4	18	88	Efrem Winters	F	Atlanta Hawks	—
1987	NBA	1	19	19	Ken Norman	F	Los Angeles Clippers	-
1987	NBA	3	8	54	Tom Schafer #	F	Denver Nuggets	—
1987	NBA	6	11	125	Doug Altenberger	G	Chicago Bulls	—
1989	NBA	1	11	11	Nick Anderson	G, F	Orlando Magic	NBA Eastern Conference Champion (1995)
1989	NBA	1	27	27	Kenny Battle	F	Detroit Pistons	—
1989	NBA	2	18	45	Scott Haffner #	G	Miami Heat	—
1990	NBA	1	5	5	Kendall Gill	G, F	Charlotte Hornets	NBA All-Rookie First Team (1991)
1990	NBA	2	14	41	Stephen Bardo	G	Atlanta Hawks	—
1990	NBA	2	15	42	Marcus Liberty	F	Denver Nuggets	—
1994	NBA	2	1	28	Deon Thomas	F	Dallas Mavericks	—
2002	NBA	1	25	25	Frank Williams	G	Denver Nuggets	—
2002	NBA	2	3	31	Robert Archibald	C, F	Memphis Grizzlies	—
2003	NBA	1	24	24	Brian Cook	F, C	Los Angeles Lakers	—
2005	NBA	1	3	3	Deron Williams^{*}	G	Utah Jazz	United States Olympic Gold Medalist (2008, 2012); NBA All-Star (2010, 2011, 2012); NBA All-Star Weekend Skills Challenge (2008); All-NBA Second Team (2008, 2010); NBA All-Rookie First Team (2006)
2005	NBA	1	24	24	Luther Head	F	Houston Rockets	NBA All-Rookie Second Team (2006)
2006	NBA	2	11	41	James Augustine	F, C	Orlando Magic	—
2006	NBA	2	16	46	Dee Brown	G	Utah Jazz	—
2012	NBA	1	11	11	Meyers Leonard	C	Portland Trail Blazers	—
2021	NBA	2	8	38	Ayo Dosunmu	G	Chicago Bulls	NBA All-Rookie Second Team (2022)
2023	NBA	1	19	19	Brandin Podziemski #	G	Golden State Warriors	NBA All-Rookie First Team (2024)
2024	NBA	1	27	27	Terrence Shannon Jr.	G, F	Minnesota Timberwolves	—
2025	NBA	1	20	20	Kasparas Jakučionis	G	Miami Heat	—
2025	NBA	1	21	21	Will Riley	F	Utah Jazz	—
2026	NBA	1	5	5	Keaton Wagler	G	Los Angeles Clippers	—
2026	NBA	1	9	9	Morez Johnson Jr. #	F/C	Dallas Mavericks	—
