= Clive Follmer =

American basketball player

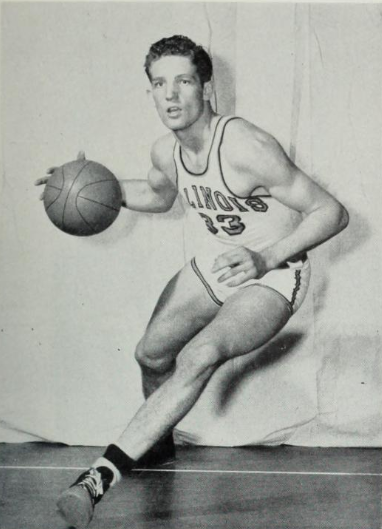
- Clive Follmer (1953)

Personal information
- Born: October 1, 1931 Forrest, Illinois
- Died: August 14, 2016 (aged 84) Urbana, Illinois
- Listed height: 6 ft 4 in (1.93 m)
- Listed weight: 195 lb (88 kg)

Career information
- High school: Forrest Township (Forrest, Illinois)
- College: Illinois (1950–1953)
- NBA draft: 1953: undrafted
- Position: Forward
- Number: 33

Career highlights
- 2× Honorable Mention All-Big Ten (1951, 1952); Big Ten Medal of Honor (1953)

Clive Allen Follmer (October 1, 1931 – August 14, 2016) was an All-Big Ten Conference basketball player at the University of Illinois during a career that spanned from 1950 to 1953, followed by a two year stint in the Chicago White Sox Minor League affiliate, Topeka Owls and the Waterloo White Hawks.

== High school ==
A native of Forrest, Illinois, Follmer attended Forrest Township High School from 1945–46 to 1948–49. He was a 6 ft 4 in (1.93 m) forward who led the team to three consecutive Illinois High School Association state basketball tournament regional championships in 1947, 1948 and 1949.

Follmer was an outstanding high school basketball player, where he led the Eskimos to consecutive IHSA boys' "Sweet-16" games in 1947, 1948 and 1949, losing each year. As a senior during the 1948–49 season, Follmer led the state of Illinois in scoring, with 714 points. The team that year lost to Ottawa High School in sectional finals.

In 1980, Follmer was inducted into the Illinois Basketball Coaches Association's Hall of Fame as a player.

== College ==
Follmer chose to play basketball at Illinois after high school, joining his older brother Mack who, even though he was the same height, played the center position. Follmer was a starting forward for three years of varsity basketball during his time at Illinois. As a freshman during the 1949–50 season, Follmer joined future All-Americans Jim Bredar and Irv Bemoras on a team that would go on to win 62 of the 75 games they would play. This era in Fighting Illini basketball is arguably the most dominant the University of Illinois had ever put together up to that point, based on the fact that from 1947 to 1953 the Illini would make the Final Four three times and be ranked in the AP top 10 four of those seasons.

As a sophomore during the 1950–51 season, Follmer joined a varsity team that included 1951 Big Ten Player of the Year Don Sunderlage as well as consensus All-American Rod Fletcher on a team that finished the Big Ten season in first place with a record of 13–1 and an overall record of 22–5 and an AP ranking of 5. The Illini would compete in the 1951 NCAA basketball tournament and move into the Final Four by defeating NC State but would lose to Kentucky 76–74, finishing in third place by defeating Oklahoma A&M.

Hall of Famer Johnny Kerr would join the varsity in Follmer's junior season of 1951–52. Meanwhile, the Fighting Illini continued their winning ways by once again finishing as the Big Ten champions and advancing to the NCAA tournament. Illinois would defeat Yale to earn a berth in the Final Four, but would lose to eventual St. John's, 61–59. They would defeat Santa Clara in the third place game, 67–64. In four seasons, this was Illinois’ third 20-game winning season, third conference championship as well as the third Final Four team, placing third in all three seasons.

In Follmer's senior season, the Illini would drop to a second place finish in the conference with a record of 14 wins and 4 losses, but would finish overall with an 18 and 4 record. Follmer would finish his season garnering two major athletic awards from the Big Ten and the University of Illinois. He would earn the Big Ten Medal of Honor, which is given to student athletes who attained the greatest proficiency in athletics and scholastic work during the season, and he would also earn the University of Illinois Athlete of the Year at the conclusion of the 1953 baseball season. During his playing time at Illinois, Follmer's teams would win 39 conference games while only losing 7 times (win pct=84.7%) while finishing with an overall record of 62 wins and only 13 losses (82.7%).

== Professional career and later life ==
Follmer did not enter the NBA draft, choosing instead to attend Illinois for one additional year in order to play an additional season of baseball. He played in the Chicago White Sox system on two teams, the Topeka Owls and the Waterloo White Hawks. In his two years of minor league baseball, Follmer had the opportunity to pitch in eight games, finishing with two wins and zero losses. Additionally, Follmer appeared in 23 games during his two years of minor league baseball with one hit in six plate appearances.

After his brief professional baseball career ended in 1955, he served as an officer in the U.S. Army and was stationed in Fort Sill, Oklahoma, until 1957. After his military service, he returned to the University of Illinois to attend law school. He graduated in 1958 and practiced law in Champaign County until his retirement in 2014.

== Personal life and death ==
Follmer married Donna Lee Henson on October 11, 1953. He died on Sunday, August 14, 2016, at Carle Foundation Hospital in Urbana, Illinois.

== College statistics ==
Season	Games	Points	Field Goals	Attempts	Avg	Free Throws	Attempts	Avg	PPG
1950–51	27	240	88	288	.386	64	109	.587	8.9
1951–52	20	237	73	210	.348	91	119	.765	11.9
1952–53	22	250	82	202	.406	86	124	.694	11.4
Totals	69	727	243	640	.380	241	352	.685	10.5
