= 1952–53 Illinois Fighting Illini men's basketball team =

American college basketball season

1952–53 Illinois Fighting Illini men's basketball
- Conference: Big Ten Conference

Ranking
- Coaches: No. 10
- AP: No. 11
- Record: 18–4 (14-4 Big Ten)
- Head coach: Harry Combes (6th season)
- Assistant coaches: Howie Braun (16th season); Cal Luther (2nd season)
- MVP: Irv Bemoras
- Captain: Jim Bredar
- Home arena: Huff Hall

1952–53 Big Ten Conference men's basketball standings
	Conf.				Overall
Team	W		L	PCT	W		L	PCT
No. 1 Indiana	17	–	1	.944	23	–	3	.885
No. 11 Illinois	14	–	4	.778	18	–	4	.818
Minnesota	11	–	7	.611	14	–	8	.636
Michigan State	11	–	7	.611	13	–	9	.591
Wisconsin	10	–	8	.556	13	–	9	.591
Iowa	9	–	9	.500	12	–	10	.545
Ohio State	7	–	11	.389	10	–	12	.455
Northwestern	5	–	13	.278	6	–	16	.273
Michigan	3	–	15	.167	6	–	16	.273
Purdue	3	–	15	.167	4	–	18	.182
Rankings from AP Poll

"1952-53 Fighting Illini men's basketball team"

The 1952–53 Illinois Fighting Illini men’s basketball team represented the University of Illinois at Urbana–Champaign.

== Regular season ==
Under the leadership of Harry Combes and coming off consecutive third-place finishes in the NCAA Tournament, the Fighting Illini men's basketball program had become one of the most powerful in the nation. The 1952-53 team returned one of the most dominant players in the NCAA, Johnny Kerr. It also returned United Press honorable mention all-American guards Irv Bemoras and Jim Bredar.

Unfortunately the Illini would lose 4 conference games during the Big Ten season which would give them a second-place finish. Three of the four losses came at the hands of ranked opponents. The starting lineup included captain Jim Bredar and Irving Bemoras at guard, Clive Follmer and Max Hooper at the forward slot with Robert Peterson and, future hall of famer Johnny "Red" Kerr at the center position. The team also included former University of Minnesota head coach Jim Dutcher.

=== Roster ===
1952–53 Illinois Fighting Illini men's basketball team
Players
Coaches

Pos.	#	Name	Height	Weight	Year	Previous school	Hometown
G	7	Morris Sterneck	6 ft 0 in (1.83 m)	170 lb (77 kg)	So	Salem High School	Salem, Illinois
G	9	Elmer Plew	6 ft 0 in (1.83 m)	170 lb (77 kg)	So	Paris High School	Paris, Illinois
G	16	Jim Wright	6 ft 0 in (1.83 m)	165 lb (75 kg)	Jr	Lawrenceville High School	Lawrenceville, Illinois
G	19	James Bredar (C)	5 ft 10 in (1.78 m)	170 lb (77 kg)	Sr	Salem High School	Salem, Illinois
C	22	Johnny Kerr	6 ft 9 in (2.06 m)	215 lb (98 kg)	Jr	Tilden High School	Chicago, Illinois
G	24	Ed Makovsky	6 ft 5 in (1.96 m)	205 lb (93 kg)	So	Morton High School	Cicero, Illinois
C	25	Robert Peterson	6 ft 8 in (2.03 m)	250 lb (113 kg)	Sr	Elgin High School	Wayne, Illinois
G	26	Irving Bemoras	6 ft 3 in (1.91 m)	188 lb (85 kg)	Sr	Marshall High School	Chicago, Illinois
F	27	Jim Dutcher	6 ft 3 in (1.91 m)	188 lb (85 kg)	So	Downers Grove High School	Downers Grove, Illinois
F	29	Max Baumgardner	6 ft 5 in (1.96 m)	195 lb (88 kg)	Sr	Sterling High School	Sterling, Illinois
F	33	Clive Follmer	6 ft 4 in (1.93 m)	198 lb (90 kg)	Sr	Forrest High School	Forrest, Illinois
F	47	Max Hooper	6 ft 5 in (1.96 m)	200 lb (91 kg)	Jr	Mt. Vernon High School	Mt. Vernon, Illinois
G	48	James Schuldt	6 ft 0 in (1.83 m)	193 lb (88 kg)	Sr	Dundee Community High School	Dundee, Illinois

Head coach

- Harry Combes (University of Illinois) (6th year)

Assistant coach(es)

- Howie Braun (University of Illinois) (16th year)
- Cal Luther (Valparaiso University) (2nd year)

Legend

- (C) Team captain
- (S) Suspended
- (I) Ineligible
- (W) Walk-on
- Injured
- Current redshirt

Roster

== Schedule ==
Date time, TV	Rank^{#}	Opponent^{#}	Result	Record	Site (attendance) city, state
Non-Conference regular season
12/10/1952*		Loyola (Chicago)	W 71–57	1-0	Huff Hall (6,905); Champaign, IL
Big Ten regular season
12/15/1952		Michigan	W 96–66	2-0 (1-0)	Huff Hall (6,905); Champaign, IL
12/20/1952*	No. 3	Butler	W 75–58	3-0	Huff Hall (6,905); Champaign, IL
12/23/1952	No. 2	at No. 17 Minnesota	L 73–77	3-1 (1-1)	Williams Arena (16,878); Minneapolis, MN
12/27/1952	No. 2	Ohio State	W 87–62	4-1 (2-1)	Huff Hall (6,905); Champaign, IL
12/30/1952*	No. 4	St. Mary's	W 94–65	5-1	Huff Hall (6,905); Champaign, IL
1/5/1953	No. 4	at Purdue	W 87–71	6-1 (3-1)	Lambert Fieldhouse (-); West Lafayette, IN
1/10/1953	No. 4	Wisconsin	W 71–61	7-1 (4-1)	Huff Hall (6,905); Champaign, IL
1/12/1953	No. 4	Northwestern; Rivalry	W 83–58	8-1 (5-1)	Huff Hall (6,905); Champaign, IL
1/17/1953	No. 4	at No. 6 Indiana; Rivalry	L 70–74 ^{2OT}	8-2 (5-2)	The Fieldhouse (10,000); Bloomington, IN
1/19/1953	No. 4	at Michigan State	W 76–64	9-2 (6-2)	Jenison Fieldhouse (-); East Lansing, MI
2/2/1953*	No. 6	DePauw	W 93–50	10-2	Huff Hall (4,002); Champaign, IL
2/7/1953	No. 6	at Wisconsin	W 65–61	11-2 (7-2)	Wisconsin Field House (13,500); Madison, WI
2/9/1953	No. 6	at Michigan	W 92–62	12-2 (8-2)	Yost Field House (6,000); Ann Arbor, MI
2/14/1953	No. 5	Iowa; Rivalry	W 80–63	13-2 (9-2)	Huff Hall (6,905); Champaign, IL
2/16/1953	No. 5	Purdue	W 93–67	14-2 (10-2)	Huff Hall (6,905); Champaign, IL
2/21/1953	No. 5	at Iowa; Rivalry	L 62–67	14-3 (10-3)	Iowa Field House (14,000); Iowa City, IA
2/23/1953	No. 5	Minnesota	W 83–82	15-3 (11-3)	Huff Hall (6,905); Champaign, IL
2/28/1953	No. 10	No. 2 Indiana; Rivalry	L 79–91	15-4 (11-4)	Huff Hall (6,905); Champaign, IL
3/2/1953	No. 10	Michigan State	W 66–53	16-4 (12-4)	Huff Hall (6,905); Champaign, IL
3/7/1953	No. 10	at Ohio State	W 93–74	17-4 (13-4)	Ohio Expo Center Coliseum (5,242); Columbus, OH
3/9/1953	No. 10	at Northwestern; Rivalry	W 86–70	18-4 (14-4)	McGaw Memorial Hall (9,700); Evanston, IL
*Non-conference game. ^{#}Rankings from AP Poll. (#) Tournament seedings in parentheses. All times are in Central Time.

== Player stats ==
Player	Games played	Field goals	Free throws	Points
John Kerr	22	153	80	386
Irv Bemoras	22	119	84	322
Jim Bredar	22	106	50	262
Clive Follmer	22	82	86	250
Max Hooper	21	73	45	191
Bob Peterson	22	53	54	160
Jim Schuldt	19	14	11	39
Jim Wright	17	15	7	37
Max Baumgardner	9	13	10	36
Ed Makovsky	16	9	15	33
Elmer Plew	13	12	6	30
Jim Dutcher	10	7	9	23
Morris Sterneck	9	1	4	6

== Awards and honors ==
- Irv Bemoras
  - Converse 2nd team All-American
  - Look Magazine 2nd team All-American
  - Helms 2nd team All-American
  - Associated Press Honorable Mention All-American
  - Team Most Valuable Player
- Jim Bredar
  - International News Service 2nd team All-American
  - Converse 2nd team All-American
  - Look Magazine 2nd team All-American
  - Helms 2nd team All-American
  - Associated Press 3rd team All-American
- Johnny Kerr
  - Associated Press Honorable Mention All-American
  - International News Service Honorable Mention All-American
  - Converse Honorable Mention All-American
- Clive Follmer
  - Big Ten Medal of Honor

== Team players drafted into the NBA ==
Player	NBA Club
Jim Bredar	Ft. Wayne Pistons
