= Tilden High School =

Tilden High School may refer to:

- Tilden High School (Chicago)
- Samuel J. Tilden High School in New York
