= Bill Pinkney (sailor) =

American sailor and retired executive (1935–2023)

William Deltoris Pinkney III (September 15, 1935 – August 31, 2023) was an American sailor and executive. In 1992, he became the first African American to sail around the world solo via the Cape of Good Hope and Cape Horn.

== Early life ==
William Deltoris Pinkney III was born on September 15, 1935, named after his father and maternal grandfather, and was raised in Douglas, on the South Side of Chicago.

His parents, Marion Henderson and William Pinkney Sr., divorced when he was young. As a child, he was one of the few Black students at his school and was unhappily targeted by peers and teachers, but found escape in a 1940 book about a Polynesian youth who makes a solo voyage that changes his life, Call it Courage by Armstrong Sperry. He attended Tilden Technical High School and graduated in 1954. Pinkney considered himself Jewish starting in childhood and converted to Judaism as an adult.

== Navy and later career ==
Pinkney joined the United States Navy in 1956, serving as a hospital corpsman. He left the navy in 1964 and moved to Puerto Rico for a few years, where he learned to sail.

After returning to the mainland in 1961, Pinkney worked as a marketing manager for Revlon and the Johnson Products Company. He planned to sail around the world in 1985 after being laid off from his job at the Department of Human Services, and he fundraised throughout the late 1980s. He originally planned to circumnavigate via the Panama and Suez canals; in 1987, Teddy Seymour became the first African American to circumnavigate solo via that route. Pinkney was persuaded by Robin Knox-Johnston, who, in 1969, had become the first man to complete a solo nonstop circumnavigation, to travel the southern capes instead and to become the first Black man to do it.

== Voyage ==
Pinkney's voyage around the world lasted 22 months. He traveled approximately 27,000 miles (43,000 km). He departed from Boston on August 5, 1990, sailing first to Bermuda, then along the eastern South American coastline, across the Atlantic Ocean to Cape Town, South Africa, across the Indian Ocean to Hobart, Tasmania, across the South Pacific Ocean, around Cape Horn, and up the eastern South American coastline, finally ending up back in Boston.

Pinkney sailed on a Valiant 47, a 47-foot cutter named The Commitment. The expedition cost around $1 million. In May of 2024, the Chicago Maritime Museum opened a new permanent exhibit entitled "Bill Pinkney: Breaking Barriers with Commitment."

On June 9, 1992, he arrived at the Charlestown Navy Yard in Boston Harbor where he was greeted by over 1,000 school students and 100 officers from the Navy, Coast Guard, and National Park Service.

The story of his trip was told in the documentary The Incredible Voyage of Bill Pinkney, based on Pinkney's own footage. The film won a 1992 Peabody Award. He also wrote a children's book about his experiences called Captain Bill Pinkney's Journey.

In 2022, he published a second children's book, Sailing Commitment Around The World By Bill Pinkney, illustrated by Pamela C. Rice who, along with Pinkney, was in the first all-Black Crew to compete in the Mackinac Race. Both Pinkney and Rice were members of the National Women's Sailing Association, which Pinkney joined in 2022 as the first male member.

== Amistad replica ==
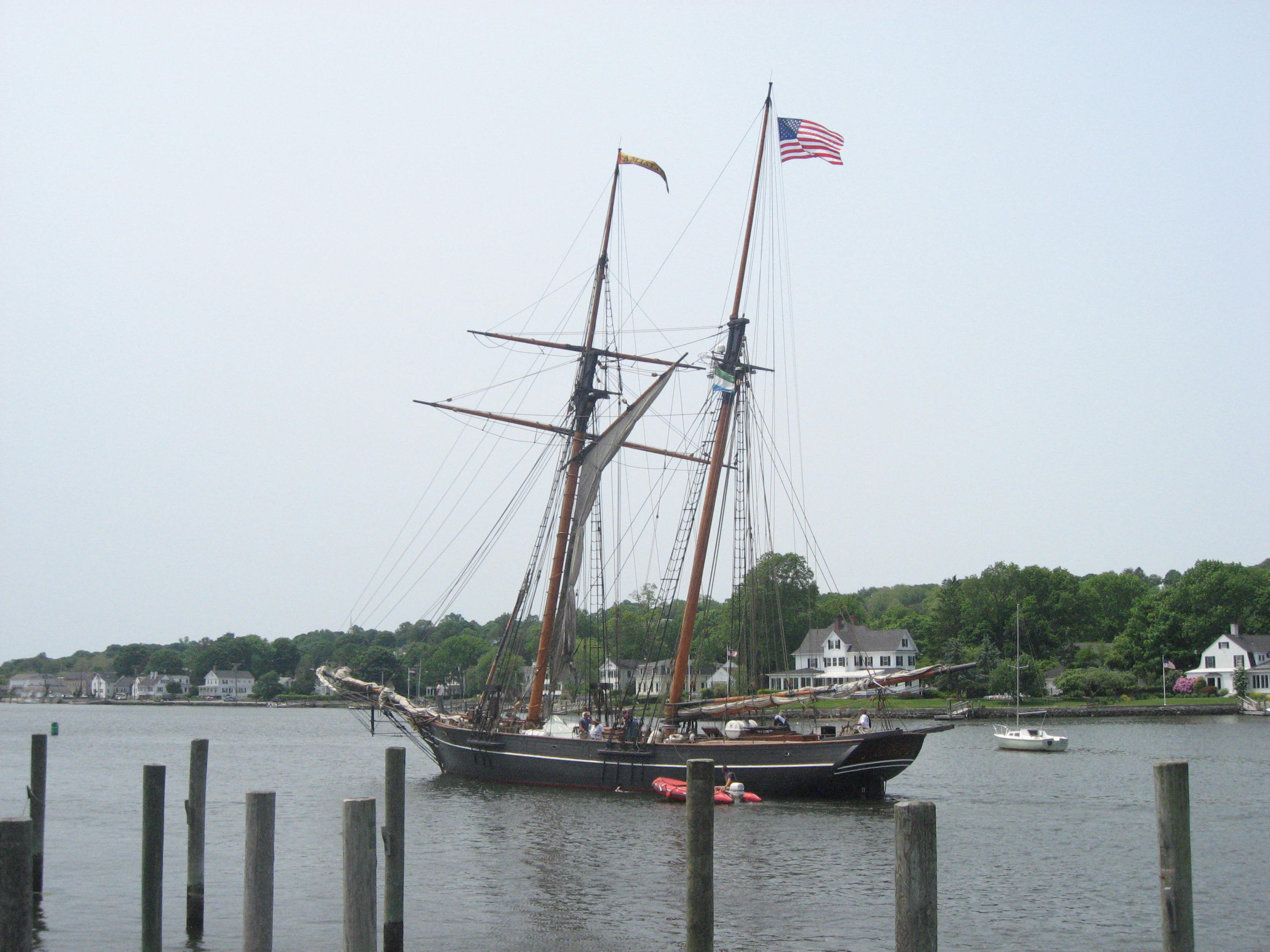
Replica of Amistad built by Mystic Seaport Museum

As a trustee of the Mystic Seaport Museum in Connecticut, Pinkney oversaw the building of the replica of the Amistad, of which he served as the first captain from 2000 to 2002. As captain, he took a group of teachers to Africa as part of a trip that traced the route of the Middle Passage crossing from Senegal to the Americas.

== Death ==
Captain Pinkney was in Atlanta, Georgia serving as a technical advisor for an upcoming research expedition. Separate from and not related to the research project, he suffered a fall and died days later as a result of his injuries. Captain Bill Pinkney died on August 31, 2023, at the age of 87. He is survived by his wife, Migdalia Vachier Pinkney, as well as his sister Naomi Pinkney, his daughter Angela Walton, and two grandchildren.

== Awards and honors ==
Pinkney was named Chicago Yacht Club’s Yachtsman of the Year in 1992. In 1999, he was named one of the Chicagoans of the Year by Chicago magazine.

Pinkney is a member of the National Sailing Hall of Fame. He was awarded The America and the Sea Award by Mystic Seaport Museum on October 26, 2022.

Pinkney received honorary degrees from Becker College, Southern Connecticut State University, and Massachusetts Maritime Academy.

Captain William "Bill" Pinkney graduated from the Southern California Maritime Institute (now known as the Los Angeles Maritime Institute).
