= 1952–53 Wisconsin Badgers men's basketball team =

American college basketball season

1952–53 Wisconsin Badgers men's basketball
- Conference: Big Ten Conference
- Record: 13–9 (10–8 Big Ten)
- Head coach: Harold E. Foster
- Home arena: UW Fieldhouse

1952–53 Big Ten Conference men's basketball standings
	Conf.				Overall
Team	W		L	PCT	W		L	PCT
No. 1 Indiana	17	–	1	.944	23	–	3	.885
No. 11 Illinois	14	–	4	.778	18	–	4	.818
Minnesota	11	–	7	.611	14	–	8	.636
Michigan State	11	–	7	.611	13	–	9	.591
Wisconsin	10	–	8	.556	13	–	9	.591
Iowa	9	–	9	.500	12	–	10	.545
Ohio State	7	–	11	.389	10	–	12	.455
Northwestern	5	–	13	.278	6	–	16	.273
Michigan	3	–	15	.167	6	–	16	.273
Purdue	3	–	15	.167	4	–	18	.182
Rankings from AP Poll

The 1952–53 Wisconsin Badgers men's basketball team represented University of Wisconsin–Madison. The head coach was Harold E. Foster, coaching his nineteenth season with the Badgers. The team played their home games at the UW Fieldhouse in Madison, Wisconsin and was a member of the Big Ten Conference.

== Schedule ==
Date time, TV	Rank^{#}	Opponent^{#}	Result	Record	Site city, state
Regular Season
12/05/1952*		Marquette	W 76–55	1–0	UW Fieldhouse; Madison, Wisconsin
12/08/1952*		at Loyola (LA)	W 81–60	2–0	New Orleans
12/15/1952		Iowa	W 66–47	3–0 (1–0)	UW Fieldhouse; Madison, Wisconsin
12/20/1952		at Purdue	L 59–65	3–1 (1–1)	Lambert Fieldhouse; West Lafayette, Indiana
12/26/1952*		California	W 64–57	4–1	UW Fieldhouse; Madison, Wisconsin
12/27/1952*		vs. Oregon	L 64–66	4–2	Iowa Field House; Iowa City, IA
12/29/1952		at Iowa	L 66–83	4–3 (1–2)	Iowa Field House; Iowa City, IA
1/03/1953		Purdue	W 50–46	5–3 (2–2)	UW Fieldhouse; Madison, Wisconsin
1/05/1953		at Minnesota	L 53–64	5–4 (2–3)	Williams Arena; Minneapolis
1/10/1953		at Illinois (No. 4)	L 61–71	5–5 (2–4)	Huff Hall; Champaign, Illinois
1/12/1953		Minnesota	W 76–74	6–5 (3–4)	UW Fieldhouse; Madison, Wisconsin
1/17/1953		at Northwestern	W 78–56	7–5 (4–4)	Welsh-Ryan Arena; Evanston, Illinois
1/19/1953		Ohio State	W 64–51	8–5 (5–4)	UW Fieldhouse; Madison, Wisconsin
2/07/1953		Illinois (No. 6)	L 61–65	8–6 (5–5)	UW Fieldhouse; Madison, Wisconsin
2/09/1953		at Indiana (No. 2)	L 48–66	8–7 (5–6)	The Fieldhouse; Bloomington, Indiana
2/14/1953		Michigan	W 75–63	9–7 (6–6)	UW Fieldhouse; Madison, Wisconsin
2/16/1953		Indiana (No. 2)	L 70–72	9–8 (6–7)	UW Fieldhouse; Madison, Wisconsin
2/21/1953		at Michigan	W 74–52	10–8 (7–7)	Yost Field House; Ann Arbor, Michigan
2/23/1953		at Michigan State	L 45–53	10–9 (7–8)	Jenison Fieldhouse; East Lansing, Michigan
2/28/1953		at Ohio State	W 69–63	11–9 (8–8)	Ohio Expo Center Coliseum; Columbus, Ohio
3/07/1953		Northwestern	W 74–58	12–9 (9–8)	UW Fieldhouse; Madison, Wisconsin
3/09/1953		Michigan State	W 58–51	13–9 (10–8)	UW Fieldhouse; Madison, Wisconsin
*Non-conference game. ^{#}Rankings from AP Poll. (#) Tournament seedings in parentheses.
