= Joe Richey =

American basketball player

Personal information
- Born: March 30, 1931 St. Johns, Arizona, U.S.
- Died: April 4, 1995 (aged 64) Fresno, California, U.S.
- Listed height: 6 ft 1 in (1.85 m)
- Listed weight: 178 lb (81 kg)

Career information
- High school: St. Johns (St. Johns, Arizona)
- College: BYU (1950–1953)
- NBA draft: 1953: – round, –
- Drafted by: Minneapolis Lakers
- Position: Forward
- Number: 6

Career highlights
- Consensus second-team All-American (1953); First-team All-Skyline Conference (1953)
- Stats at Basketball Reference

Joseph Richey (March 30, 1931 – April 4, 1995) was an American basketball player. He was an All-American at Brigham Young University (BYU) and later played in the Amateur Athletic Union.

Joe Richey, a 6'1 (1.85 m) forward from St. Johns, Arizona, played at BYU from 1950 to 1953. Richey was a three-year starter and led the Cougars to berths in both the National Invitation Tournament (NIT) and NCAA tournament as a sophomore in 1951. While the Cougars bowed out in the second round in the NCAAs, they won the NIT – defeating Dayton 62–43 in the final. This team is regarded one of the best in BYU history.

As a junior and senior, Richey led the Cougars in scoring at averages of 14.6 and 17.6 points per game respectively. He was known for his quickness and was a strong rebounder for his size, averaging 6.5 rebounds per game for his career. As a senior in the 1952–53 season, Richey again led the Cougars to the NIT, though this time the Cougars stay was a short one, ending with a first round loss to Niagara. Richey was named a second team consensus All-American at the conclusion of the season. Richey finished with 1,178 points for his BYU career.

Joe Richey was drafted by the Minneapolis Lakers in 1953. He instead played for several years in the AAU for Kirby's Shoes entry in the league.

After his playing days were over, Richey became a paving contractor. He also remained active in the Church of Jesus Christ of Latter-day Saints, becoming an Elder. In 1992, Richey was diagnosed with leukemia. He lived for three more years, during which time he performed a Mormon mission in Birmingham, England. Joe Richey ultimately died of leukemia on April 4, 1995.
