= Mike Swistowicz =

American football player (1927–1973)

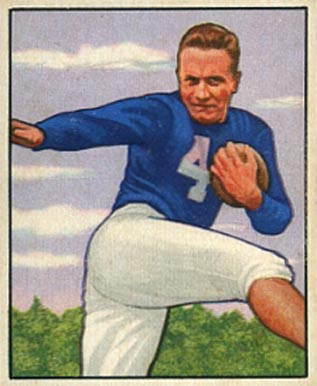
- Swistowicz on a 1950 Bowman football card

No. 23, 44
- Positions: Halfback, Defensive back

Personal information
- Born: April 22, 1927; Chicago, Illinois, U.S.
- Died: November 24, 1973 (aged 46); Elgin, Illinois, U.S.
- Listed height: 5 ft 10 in (1.78 m)
- Listed weight: 185 lb (84 kg)

Career information
- High school: Tilden (Chicago)
- College: Notre Dame (1946–1949)
- NFL draft: 1950: 5th round, 55th overall pick

Career history
- New York Yanks (1950); Chicago Cardinals (1950)

Awards and highlights
- 3× National champion (1946, 1947, 1949)

Career NFL statistics
- Return yards: 59
- Stats at Pro Football Reference

Michael Paul Swistowicz (April 22, 1927 – November 24, 1973) was an American professional football player who played one season in the National Football League (NFL) with the New York Yanks and Chicago Cardinals. He was selected by the Yanks in the fifth round of the 1950 NFL draft after playing college football at the University of Notre Dame.

== Early life and college ==
Michael Paul Swistowicz was born on April 22, 1927, in Chicago, Illinois. He attended Tilden High School in Chicago.

Swistowicz played college football for the Notre Dame Fighting Irish of the University of Notre Dame from 1946 to 1949. He rushed 41 times for 186 yards as a freshman in 1946 while also catching four passes for 70 yards. During the 1947 season, he recorded 58 carries for 257 yards and three receptions for 42 yards. Swistowics totaled 41 rushing attempts for 172 yards in 1948 and 11 rushing attempts for 53 yards in 1949. The Fighting Irish were national champions in 1946, 1947, and 1949.

== Professional career ==
Swistowicz was selected by the New York Yanks in the fifth round, with the 55th overall pick, of the 1950 NFL draft. He signed with the team on June 3. He played in one game for the Yanks during the 1950 season.

On October 5, 1950, the Chicago Cardinals announced that they had purchased Swistowicz from the Yanks. He appeared in eight games, starting two, for the Cardinals in 1950, and returned four punts for 59 yards. He was released by the Cardinals in 1951.

== Personal life ==
Swistowicz died on November 24, 1973, in Elgin, Illinois after working out at the local YMCA.
