= 1952–53 Michigan Wolverines men's basketball team =

American college basketball season

1952–53 Michigan Wolverines men's basketball
- Conference: Big Ten Conference
- Record: 6–16 (3–15 Big Ten)
- Head coach: William Perigo
- Captain: Doug Lawrence
- Home arena: Yost Field House

1952–53 Big Ten Conference men's basketball standings
	Conf.				Overall
Team	W		L	PCT	W		L	PCT
No. 1 Indiana	17	–	1	.944	23	–	3	.885
No. 11 Illinois	14	–	4	.778	18	–	4	.818
Minnesota	11	–	7	.611	14	–	8	.636
Michigan State	11	–	7	.611	13	–	9	.591
Wisconsin	10	–	8	.556	13	–	9	.591
Iowa	9	–	9	.500	12	–	10	.545
Ohio State	7	–	11	.389	10	–	12	.455
Northwestern	5	–	13	.278	6	–	16	.273
Michigan	3	–	15	.167	6	–	16	.273
Purdue	3	–	15	.167	4	–	18	.182
Rankings from AP Poll

The 1952–53 Michigan Wolverines men's basketball team represented the University of Michigan in intercollegiate basketball during the 1952–53 season. The team finished the season in a tie for ninth place in the Big Ten Conference with an overall record of 6–16 and 3–15 against conference opponents.

William Perigo was in his first year as the team's head coach. Paul Groffsky was the team's leading scorer with 301 points in 22 games for an average of 13.6 points per game. Doug Lawrence was the team captain.

== Statistical leaders ==
Player	Pos.	Yr	G	FG	FT	RB	Pts	PPG
Paul Groffsky			22	106-305	89-176		301	13.6
Don Eaddy			22	112-375	68-106		292	13.2
Paul Groffsky			22	91-284	68-125		250	11.3
John Codwell			22	76-225	79-127		231	10.5
Milt Mead			22	85-253	60-89		230	10.4
Doug Lawrence			21	70-192	27-44		167	7.9
Ray Pavichevich			22	54-184	28-53		136	6.1
Ralph Kaufman			22	29-118	42-88		100	4.5
Totals			22	562-1785	426-739		1550	70.4
