= Johnny Kerr =

American basketball player, coach, and commentator (1932–2009)

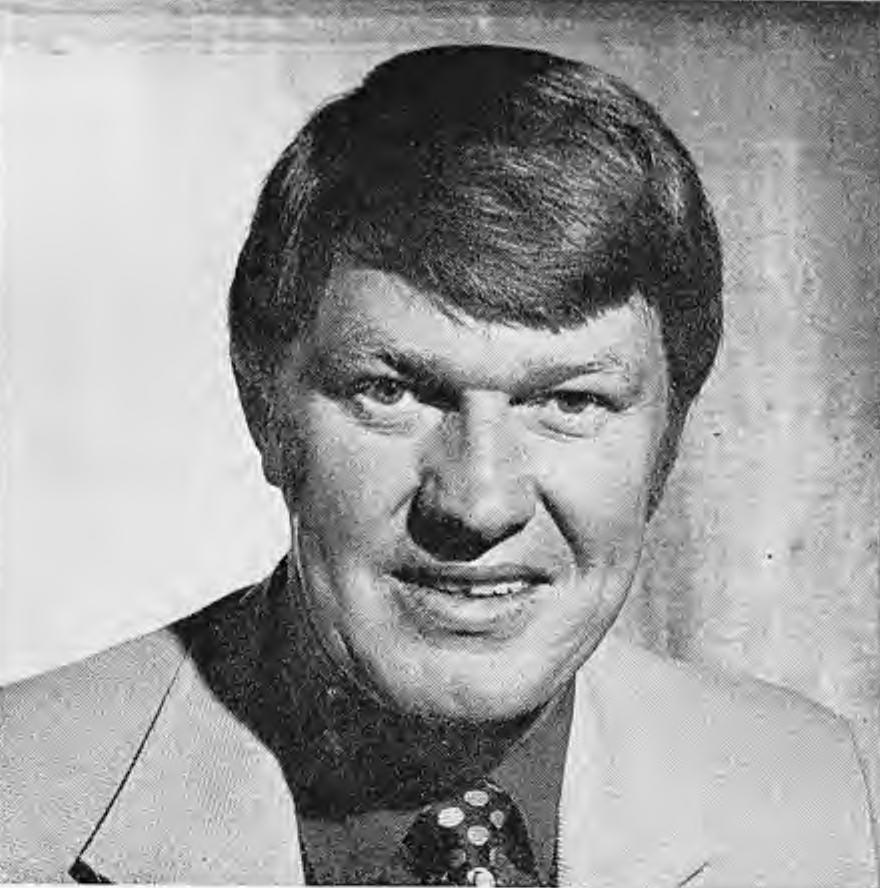
- Kerr as business manager of the Bulls in 1974

Personal information
- Born: July 17, 1932 Chicago, Illinois, U.S.
- Died: February 26, 2009 (aged 76) Chicago, Illinois, U.S.
- Listed height: 6 ft 9 in (2.06 m)
- Listed weight: 230 lb (104 kg)

Career information
- High school: Tilden (Chicago, Illinois)
- College: Illinois (1951–1954)
- NBA draft: 1954: 1st round, 6th overall pick
- Drafted by: Syracuse Nationals
- Playing career: 1954–1966
- Position: Center
- Number: 10, 43

Career history

Playing
- 1954–1965: Syracuse Nationals / Philadelphia 76ers
- 1965–1966: Baltimore Bullets

Coaching
- 1966–1968: Chicago Bulls
- 1968–1970: Phoenix Suns

Career highlights
- As player: NBA champion (1955); 3× NBA All-Star (1956, 1959, 1963); Third-team All-American – AP, UPI, Look (1954); As coach: NBA Coach of the Year (1967)

Career statistics
- Points: 12,480 (13.8 ppg)
- Rebounds: 10,092 (11.2 rpg)
- Assists: 2,004 (2.2 apg)
- Stats at NBA.com
- Stats at Basketball Reference

John Graham Kerr (July 17, 1932 – February 26, 2009), also known as Red Kerr, was an American basketball player, coach, executive and broadcaster who devoted six decades to the sport at all levels. In 2009, he was honored with the Naismith Memorial Basketball Hall of Fame's John W. Bunn Lifetime Achievement Award for his contributions to basketball.

The affable 6 ft 9 in (2.06 m), 230-pound (104.3 kg) center starred for the University of Illinois (1951–1954) before he became a three-time All-Star and one-time league champion in the NBA (1954–66), primarily as a member of the Syracuse Nationals.

Kerr was the first of the NBA iron men in the early years of the league. From 1954 to 1965, he played in 917 consecutive games, including 844 in the regular season, a record that stood for 17 years. He averaged 13.8 points, 11.2 rebounds and 2.2 assists in 905 games over 12 seasons, all except one with the Nationals (later the Philadelphia 76ers). More workmanlike than spectacular, Kerr averaged in double figures in points and rebounds in seven consecutive seasons (1956–64), when he earned the reputation as one of the best all-around big men in the league.

After retirement as a player, Kerr held several coaching and administrative positions, most notably coach of the Chicago Bulls and Phoenix Suns in their first-ever seasons. In his debut on the bench, the 1966–67 Bulls defied long odds to earn a postseason berth, the first expansion team in major professional team sports to do so.

The Chicago native concluded his career as a Bulls television analyst for thirty-three years, during which he was one of the most recognizable personalities of the Bulls dynasty in the 1990s decade.

== Early life ==
Kerr was born on July 17, 1932, in Chicago. His father was born in Scotland, and was a top soccer player. He came to the United States and worked as a meat packer in Chicago, dying of pneumonia at age 32, when Kerr was three years old. Kerr was raised in the 67th and Racine neighborhood on the South Side of Chicago. Kerr was a frequent 16-inch softball player, his personal favorite sport, at Ogden Park. He had aspirations of a career working in a foundry, in which he became proficient as a Tilden Technical High School student. Kerr said "'People from Tilden didn't go to college.... They went to work. My courses were shop, woodworking, auto mechanics and foundry.'"

Although Kerr's first passion was soccer, an eight-inch growth spurt during his senior year at Tilden Tech coupled with some friendly persuasion from its head basketball coach Bill Postl and school principal Robert Lakemacher turned his attention to basketball. Kerr had entered high school at 6 ft (1.83 m) tall and was 6 ft 9 in (2.06 m) by his senior year. The pivotman (center) led the Blue Devils to the 1950 Chicago Public League championship in his only season with the team. After that, Kerr received college basketball scholarship offers.

== College career ==
Upon graduation from high school in mid-year (January 1950), Kerr was set to attend Bradley in the fall. However, after a visit from Illini freshman Irv Bemoras touting the benefits of playing for head coach Harry Combes and the Fighting Illini, he made a visit to Champaign and quickly changed his mind. Always quick with a quip, Kerr became known for his self-deprecating humor. When asked about his introduction to Chaucer in college, Kerr said the two hadn't met yet, but he assumed they would at a fraternity party.

After committing to Illinois in the fall of 1950, Kerr made his varsity debut as a sophomore center-forward in the 1951–52 season. Despite the loss of the 1950-51 team’s leading scorers, captain and Most Valuable Player Don Sunderlage and Ted Beach, from the No. 5 Associated Press (AP) nationally ranked Illini, Kerr and his teammates captured the 1951-52 Big Ten Conference championship with a 12–2 conference record (22–4 overall), and a berth in the NCAA Tournament.

The team advanced to the Final Four with victories over Dayton and Duquesne. The Illini lost to St. John's in the semifinals, 61–59, then they beat Santa Clara in the third-place game, with Kerr scoring 26 points. He was selected to the 1952 NCAA All-Tournament team. Kerr led the Illini with a 13.7-points average in 26 games. Illinois finished the season with a final AP ranking of No. 2 in the nation.

Kerr joined three starters from the previous season on the 1952–53 Illini team, but the team would not enjoy similar success. It finished 18–4 overall (14–4 in conference), which was good for a second-place finish to national champion Indiana. Kerr continued to shine with a team-high average of 17.5 points in 22 games. The Illini ranked No. 11 in the country in the final AP poll.

By the time that Kerr entered his senior year, he had grown one inch to 6-foot-9 and become a full-time pivotman. While the finale was the best of his three varsity seasons individually, the team would be the least successful among them. The 1953–54 Illini finished third in the Big Ten with a 10–4 record (17–5 overall) and was ranked 19th in the country in the final AP poll. They lost 67–64 to Indiana in the Big Ten championship game. Kerr paced the team in scoring for the third straight season, shattering the single-season team record with 556 points in 22 games for a 25.3 points average, which also led the Big Ten in scoring. In three varsity seasons, Kerr scored 1,299 points, an average of 18.6 points per game.

Kerr was selected a first-team forward Big Ten All-Star, and the Big Ten's Most Valuable Player in 1954. He was elected to the University of Illinois All-Century Team in 2004.

== Professional career ==
=== Syracuse Nationals-Philadelphia 76ers (1954–1965) ===
In 1954, the Syracuse Nationals selected Kerr at the sixth overall pick of the NBA draft. The 22-year-old played a bit role with the veteran-laden team in the early season. By the turn of the calendar year, he had earned enough trust from head coach Al Cervi to warrant an increased role. He went on to average 10.5 points and 6.6 rebounds per game in the regular season.

Come playoff time, Kerr was part of the core nucleus, starting alongside Dolph Schayes, Red Rocha, Paul Seymour and George King. In his postseason debut, the rookie dominated with 27 points and 14 rebounds in a 110–100 victory over the Boston Celtics that set the tone in the Eastern Division finals. The Nationals went on to beat the Celtics in four games, with Kerr averaging 16.5 points and 9.8 rebounds per game. The Nationals then beat the Fort Wayne Pistons in seven games in the NBA Finals to capture their first and only NBA championship in Syracuse. Kerr averaged 12.3 points and 11.3 rebounds per game in the finals, second only to Schayes in both categories.

Even though the Nationals included future Hall of Famer Schayes, who was an All-Star selection for 12 consecutive years, Kerr was also a three-time All-Star selection (1956, 1959, 1963) who contributed similarly in the high and low post. As a big man who was a regular ball handler and passer, Kerr had a skillset which was not common amongst other big men at the time. In addition to his strong production as a rebounder, he was known for being a skilled passer and master of the backdoor play, which he executed with guards Al Bianchi, Larry Costello and Hal Greer. Schayes, who called Kerr his best friend, said the center played rival superstars Bill Russell and Wilt Chamberlain as well as anyone in the era.

Kerr averaged double-doubles in scoring and rebounding from the 1956-57 through 1963-64 seasons. In the 1958-59 season he averaged a career-high 17.8 points per game to go along with 14 rebounds a game in one of his all-star seasons. In the 1961-62 season, he averaged a career high 14.7 rebounds per game and 16.8 points per game. The following season, the team's last year in Syracuse, he was 6th in NBA most valuable player voting, averaging 15.7 points and 13 rebounds per game. He was in the top-10 players in rebounding eight times and the top-five three times. Kerr also averaged a double-double over 76 playoff games, with 12.3 points and 10.6 rebounds per game.

=== Baltimore Bullets (1965–1966) ===
On September 22, 1965, Kerr was dealt to the Baltimore Bullets for guard Wally (later Wali) Jones. The veteran averaged 11.0 points and 8.3 rebounds during the 1965–66 season, after which he was selected by the Chicago Bulls in the 1966 NBA expansion draft. Instead, Kerr voluntarily retired as a player to become the head coach of his hometown team.

=== Career ===
Kerr finished his career with 12,480 points and 10,092 rebounds along with the NBA record for most consecutive regular season games played (844 from 1954-65). The mark stood until November, 1982, when San Diego Clippers guard Randy Smith surpassed it en route to a streak of 906 games. He averaged a double-double over his career (13.8 points and 11.2 rebounds per game). He was the fifth player with 10,000 rebounds in NBA history. Yet while the majority of players with comparable achievements in the NBA's first 50 years of existence are Hall of Fame members, Kerr is not among them.

== Coaching career ==
=== Chicago Bulls (1966–1968) ===
After Kerr was hired as head coach, one of his first acts was to convince owner and general manager Dick Klein to claim former Bullets teammate, 6 ft 5 in (1.96 m) guard, Jerry Sloan in the expansion draft. While three Bullets veterans played ahead of the more defense-minded Sloan, Kerr saw considerable potential in the young player. He also lobbied for the acquisition of veteran floor leader and future Hall of Fame guard Guy Rodgers in a trade that sent guards Jim King (drafted from the Los Angeles Lakers) and Jeff Mullins (drafted from the St. Louis Hawks) to the San Francisco Warriors before the start of the season. The trade led the NBA to change the rules so that expansion teams were not permitted to make trades for one year after entering the league.

Few outside the organization gave the expansion club much of a chance, however, least of all St. Louis Hawks player-coach Richie Guerin, who on the eve of the regular-season opener said the Bulls would be fortunate to win 20 games in the 81-game campaign. It is also reported that Guerin predicted the Bulls would not win 10 games, which Sloan said provided the team strong motivation to be successful. In the first game in team history on October 15, 1966, the Bulls stunned the Hawks 104–97, with Rodgers scoring 36 points.

Kerr emphasized team defense and the Rodgers-led fast break to atone for the obvious shortage of talent on the roster. Kerr let Rodgers run the Bulls offense the vast majority of the time. Rodgers went on to set a then NBA record with 908 assists during his one season with the Bulls (with a league leading 11.2 assists per game to go along with an 18 points per game scoring average). Rodgers and Bulls' teammate Don Kojis, who had great leaping ability, worked together and "introduced the back door baseline lob slam dunk to the NBA" (the alley-oop), which became the team's most popular play that year in Chicago. There is some dispute, however, over the origins of the alley-oop.

Sloan and Rodgers proved to be instrumental in the immediate success of the so-called "Baby Bulls", who quieted the naysayers with a 33–48 record, fourth best in the five-team Western Division. Both were selected to the Western Division All-Star team. The 33–48 record was sufficient to qualify the Bulls for a playoff spot, losing to the Hawks in the Western Division Semifinals. This was the first (and so far only time) that an expansion NBA team has done so in league history. Kerr was awarded the NBA Coach of the Year Award, the only person to receive the award with a sub-.500 record (through the 2024-25 season).

The Bulls struggled the following season, after trading Rodgers in October to the Cincinnati Royals. They started with 15 losses in their first 16 games. The team regrouped to earn a playoff berth with a 29–53 record, only to be eliminated in five games by the Los Angeles Lakers in the first round. Kerr coached his last game with the Bulls on March 31, 1968, in the series ending loss to the Lakers. The inability to build off the momentum of the previous season coupled with philosophical differences with team ownership led to Kerr's dismissal after the season. It was also reported that the expansion Phoenix Suns enticed Kerr to leave the Bulls to become the Suns first head coach.

=== Phoenix Suns (1968–1970) ===
In April 1968, Kerr was hired as the first head coach of the expansion Phoenix Suns by the Suns first general manager (and Kerr's longtime friend), 28-year old Jerry Colangelo. Like Kerr, Colangelo worked for the expansion Chicago Bulls in 1966; serving as head scout and in the front office, before leaving the Bulls in 1968 to lead the Suns. Also like Kerr, Colangelo had attended Illinois and played college ball there.

After the Suns lost a coin flip that would have brought former UCLA superstar center Lew Alcindor (later Kareem Abdul-Jabbar) to Phoenix at the first pick of the NBA draft, Kerr was left with a woefully inexperienced group that failed to duplicate the success of his expansion Bulls team in Chicago. The Suns finished in last place with a 16–66 record in the Western Division, eleven wins less than the next worst team.

Better things were expected in the 1969-70 season with the addition of future Hall of Famer Connie Hawkins, forward Paul Silas and number two draft pick Neal Walk (on a team that also included future Hall of fame guard Gail Goodrich and 1970 all-star guard Dick Van Arsdale). Even though the club made progress at the outset of the 1969–70 season with a 15–23 record, they had lost six of their last seven games, and Kerr was asked for his resignation.

He was replaced as interim coach by Colangelo, his close friend, who called it both his biggest thrill to become an NBA coach (his first coaching position), but his saddest day to be replacing his close friend. Kerr remained with the organization for the remainder of the season, serving as a scout and color commentator alongside Hot Rod Hundley on radio broadcasts. The Suns were 24–20 under Colangelo, with Hawkins first-team All-NBA.

== Broadcasting, front office career ==
Kerr spent the 1970–71 and 1971-72 campaigns as the Virginia Squires' administrative vice president in the rival ABA, joining his old teammate and Bulls assistant coach Al Bianchi, who was now the Squires' head coach and general manager. He became general manager in 1972. One of the Squires players Kerr signed was rookie Julius Irving, regarded by many as the greatest player of his time and the key player in leading to the ABA's merger with the NBA. Kerr also discovered future Hall of Famer George Gervin playing playground basketball.

Kerr returned to the Chicago Bulls in the front office as business manager from 1973-75, under coach and general manager Dick Motta. In 1975, the Bulls play-by-play announcer Jim Durham suggested that Kerr provide commentary during games, and Kerr remained as a color commentator until the end of the 2007–08 season.

As a broadcaster, Kerr was part of the Bulls' six championships in the 1990s and Michael Jordan's entire career with the team. He became best known for his emphatic call on "The Shot", Jordan's series-winning basket in Game 5 of the first round of the 1989 Eastern Conference playoffs. "The Bulls win it! We win it! ... Whooo!" Kerr screamed into his microphone.

Over the years, Kerr and Jordan collaborated in a pre-game ritual in which the Bulls superstar would head to Kerr's seat at courtside immediately prior to tip-off and playfully clap talcum powder in front of him. Jordan later said, "I don't know how it started. I think he had a nice suit on and I wanted to mess him up a little."

Kerr made occasional appearances as a halftime commentator in the first half of the 2008–09 season, but as his struggles with prostate cancer continued, public appearances became less frequent. The Bulls honored Kerr for his years of service at a February 10, 2009 halftime ceremony, where the team unveiled a sculpture of Kerr that would stand in the United Center. During the ceremony, Michael Jordan said "'Us players come and go ... but the one constant thing about the Chicago Bulls is Johnny (Red) Kerr.'" President Barack Obama was among those speaking in honor of Kerr.

At the ceremony, he also received the Naismith Memorial Basketball Hall of Fame's John W. Bunn Lifetime Achievement Award, presented by Jerry Colangelo. February 10, 2009, was declared Johnny Red Kerr Appreciation Day in the city of Chicago by Mayor Richard M. Daley.

== Personal life ==
Kerr's life and that of his family was marked by private and public service to other people. After his father died, Kerr's mother took in her four siblings and a cousin during the Great Depression. In high school, he assisted in the School Children's Aid society's drive to obtain clothing for children who would not have been able to attend school otherwise. Kerr and his wife Betsy had five children and adopted her sister's three children when Betsy's sister died within months of her husband.

His life also included tragedy. Kerr's oldest child, John Jr. (Jay), died suddenly of meningitis when Jay was three years old. One of the nieces he and Betsy adopted was murdered at college, likely by a never captured serial killer.

He was also an insurance investment consultant, and head of Kerr Financial Services.

== Death ==
Kerr died of prostate cancer at 76 years of age on February 26, 2009, only hours after ex-Bulls guard-broadcaster Norm Van Lier suffered a fatal heart attack. Kerr had been married to Betsy (Nemecek) Kerr since 1954 until her death in 2000, having met her while they attended the University of Illinois. Their marriage was generally considered the center of his life.

== Legacy and honors ==
Kerr was fondly regarded during his entire basketball career for his good nature, as well as his qualities as a player, coach and broadcaster. Newspaper Enterprise Association (NEA) sports editor and writer Murray Olderman once began an article about Kerr with "Johnny Kerr is a beautiful man", then going on to describe Kerr's humor, perspective, insight and humility. In 2009, Kerr received the Naismith Hall of Fame's John Bunn Award honoring those "whose outstanding accomplishments have impacted the high school, college, professional or international game." Hall of Fame president John L. Doleva called Kerr the "'epitome of what the [award] is meant to recognize.'"

Kerr has received the following awards and honors, among others;

- 1952 – 2nd Team All-Big Ten
- 1952 – NCAA Final Four All-Tournament Team
- 1952 – Honorable Mention All-American
- 1953 – 2nd Team All-Big Ten
- 1953 – Honorable Mention All-American
- 1953 – 1st Team All-Big Ten
- 1954 – 2nd Team All-American
- 1954 – Illini Most Valuable Player
- 1954 – Big Ten Player of the Year
- 1954 – Chicago Tribune Silver Basketball Award
- 1967 – NBA Coach of the Year Award
- 1973 – Illinois Basketball Coaches Association's Hall of Fame as a player.
- 2004 – Illini Men's Basketball All-Century Team.
- 2007 – 100 Legends of the IHSA Boys Basketball Tournament.
- 2008 – Illini men's basketball honored jersey.
- 2009 – John W. Bunn Lifetime Achievement Award.
- 2018 – Illinois Athletics Hall of Fame

== Career statistics ==
=== College ===
Season	Games	Points	PPG	Field Goals	Attempts	Avg	Free Throws	Attempts	Avg	Big Ten Record	Overall Record	Highlight
1951–52	26	357	13.7	143	365	.392	71	124	.573	12–2	22–4	Honorable Mention All-American
1952–53	22	386	17.5	153	397	.385	80	123	.650	14–4	18–4	Honorable Mention All-American
1953–54	22	556	25.3	210	520	.404	136	213	.638	10–4	17–5	Big Ten Player of the Year
**Totals**	**70**	**1229**	**18.6**	**506**	**1282**	**.395**	**287**	**460**	**.624**	**36–10**	**57–13**	

=== NBA ===
Legend
GP	Games played	GS	Games started	MPG	Minutes per game
FG%	Field goal percentage	3P%	3-point field goal percentage	FT%	Free throw percentage
RPG	Rebounds per game	APG	Assists per game	SPG	Steals per game
BPG	Blocks per game	PPG	Points per game	**Bold**	Career high
†	Won an NBA championship

==== Regular season ====
Year	Team	GP	MPG	FG%	FT%	RPG	APG	PPG
1954–55†	Syracuse	72	21.2	.419	.682	6.6	1.1	10.5
1955–56	Syracuse	72	29.4	.403	.655	8.4	1.2	13.3
1956–57	Syracuse	72	30.4	.403	.719	11.2	1.3	12.4
1957–58	Syracuse	72	33.1	.399	.664	13.4	1.2	15.2
1958–59	Syracuse	72	**37.1**	.441	.766	14.0	2.0	**17.8**
1959–60	Syracuse	75	31.6	.392	.752	12.2	2.2	14.7
1960–61	Syracuse	79	33.9	.397	.729	12.0	2.5	13.4
1961–62	Syracuse	**80**	34.6	.443	.735	**14.7**	3.0	16.3
1962–63	Syracuse	**80**	32.0	**.474**	.753	13.0	2.7	15.7
1963–64	Philadelphia	**80**	36.7	.429	.751	12.7	**3.4**	16.8
1964–65	Philadelphia	**80**	22.6	.370	.696	6.9	2.5	8.2
1965–66	Baltimore	71	24.9	.413	**.768**	8.3	3.2	11.0
Career		905	30.7	.418	.723	11.2	2.2	13.8

==== Playoffs ====
Year	Team	GP	MPG	FG%	FT%	RPG	APG	PPG
1954–55†	Syracuse	**11**	33.0	.391	.557	10.7	1.2	13.8
1955–56	Syracuse	8	26.6	.481	.455	8.5	1.3	11.1
1956–57	Syracuse	5	32.4	.431	.690	13.8	1.2	15.2
1957–58	Syracuse	3	**38.7**	.327	.778	**20.3**	1.0	16.7
1958–59	Syracuse	9	34.7	.352	.909	12.0	2.7	14.4
1959–60	Syracuse	3	34.7	.294	**.917**	8.3	3.0	13.7
1960–61	Syracuse	8	26.3	.341	.696	12.4	2.5	9.5
1961–62	Syracuse	5	38.6	.376	.750	16.0	2.0	17.6
1962–63	Syracuse	5	37.4	.433	.762	15.0	1.8	13.6
1963–64	Philadelphia	5	37.0	**.482**	.750	13.8	**3.2**	**19.0**
1964–65	Philadelphia	**11**	16.5	.358	.714	3.5	2.5	5.7
1965–66	Baltimore	3	16.3	.182	.500	5.7	1.3	1.7
Career		76	29.9	.386	.687	10.9	2.0	12.3

=== All-Star Games ===
Year	Team	GP	MPG	FG%	FT%	RPG	APG	PPG
1955–56	Syracuse	1	16.0	**.500**	.000	8.0	0.0	4.0
1958–59	Syracuse	1	**21.0**	.214	.500	**9.0**	**2.0**	**7.0**
1962–63	Syracuse	1	11.0	.000	**1.000**	2.0	1.0	2.0

== Head coaching record ==
Legend
Regular season	G	Games coached	W	Games won	L	Games lost	W–L %	Win–loss %
Playoffs	PG	Playoff games	PW	Playoff wins	PL	Playoff losses	PW–L %	Playoff win–loss %

Team	Year	G	W	L	W–L%	Finish	PG	PW	PL	PW–L%	Result
Chicago	1966–67	81	33	48	.407	4th in Western	3	0	3	.000	Lost in Division semifinals
Chicago	1967–68	82	29	53	.354	4th in Western	5	1	4	.200	Lost in Division semifinals
Phoenix	1968–69	82	16	66	.195	7th in Western	-	-	-	-	Missed playoffs
Phoenix	1969–70	38	15	23	.395	4th in Western	-	-	-	-	Fired
Total		283	93	190	.329		8	1	7	.125	

== See also ==
- List of National Basketball Association career rebounding leaders
