= Teddy Seymour =

Teddy Seymour is the first black man to sail around the world solo.

Teddy Seymour on the hull of Love Song.

On June 19, 1987, Teddy Seymour became officially designated the first black man to sail around the world when he completed his solo sailing circumnavigation in Frederiksted, St. Croix, of the United States Virgin Islands.

== Circumnavigation ==
Aboard his 35-foot (11m) Ericson, MK I, Alberg hull design, full keel, fiberglass boat, entitled Love Song, Teddy circumnavigated the earth, making only 12 stops. On February 24, 1986, after years of preparation, and with only a small pocket of money, Seymour began his sailing trip from his home port of St. Croix. He finished his trip exactly where he had started a year and a half later.

On June 18, 1992, the Bay State Banner wrote the following:

"Lacking corporate sponsors and media coverage, Seymour's 16-month journey was in every bit a solo effort. 'The easy part was sailing around the world,' said the 51-year-old Seymour in a telephone interview with the Banner. 'I've almost lost my life on many occasions.'

'I've been through Vietnam, I've lived in L.A. where the cops hassled me just because I was a black man running down the street in a sweatsuit.'

Born in Yonkers, New York, Seymour attended Central State University in Ohio on a track scholarship. In 1965, Seymour began a seven-year stint in the United States Marine Corps, serving in Vietnam as a captain.

After relocating to the Virgin Islands where he took a job as a primary school teacher, Seymour began planning his journey. It took seven years of paying off $62,000 in bank loans for the purchase and preparation of his 35-foot sailboat before Seymour left Saint Croix, headed for the Panama Canal.

"I worked as a school teacher, a night watchman, a waiter and I chartered my boat," he explained.

Restricted by a $5,200 travel budget, $2,000 of which was on a credit card, Seymour limited his stops to 12 ports including several South Pacific Islands, Australia, South Yemen, Israel and Greece.

Seymour routed his journey through the Mediterranean via the Suez Canal after he was advised by a U.S. Counsel to stay out of Durban, South Africa, where he would have had to stop before passing under the Cape of Good Hope.

Unfortunately, the Mediterranean was in the middle of its worst winter in 42 years. Dogged by gales and a damaged navigation system, Seymour made his longest layover in Pilos, Greece, where he waited over 30 days for the repairs and better weather.

After a two-month 2,000-mile (3,200 km) journey, Seymour passed through the Strait of Gibraltar with $38 worth of food and headed for home.

Although he was certified by sailing authorities as being the 161st person to make the circumnavigation solo, he received little mention in the press outside of a few sailing magazines.

== World Sailing Records & Awards ==
The Joshua Slocum Society, the Seamen's Church Institute of New York and New Jersey, Sea Magazine, St. Croix Avis, New York Times, among many others, all acknowledge his accomplishment. The Legislature of the Virgin Islands has also declared a resolution to preserve his contribution to the history of Virgin Islands maritime culture and world sailing.

He was given the prestigious Golden Circle Award recognition, by the Joshua Slocum Society: Joshua Slocum Society World Solo Circumnavigation Sailing Logbook

In 1994, the Seamen's Church Institute of New York and New Jersey, a 150-year-old non-profit maritime agency in NYC that promotes the welfare of seafarers, held a special black-tie ceremony to celebrate Teddy's sailing feat. Seymour said little at the ceremony but did attend.

== Running Achievements ==
Teddy won an athletic scholarship to attend to college, and is a former All-American cross country road runner star at Central State University in Wilberforce, Ohio. For over 20 years (and counting), the Virgin Islands Pace Road Runners club hosts an 8.4 mile "Toast-To-The-Captain" road race in honor of Seymour.
