= 1954 NBA All-Star Game =

Exhibition basketball game

	1	2	3	4	OT	Total
East	28	20	17	19	14	98
West	25	19	23	17	9	93
- Date: Thursday, January 21, 1954
- Arena: Madison Square Garden (III)
- City: New York City
- MVP: Bob Cousy
- Attendance: 16,487
- Network: WPIX

NBA All-Star Game
< 1953	1955 >

The 4th Annual NBA All Star Game was an exhibition basketball game held on January 21, 1954, at the Madison Square Garden (MSG III) in New York City, home of the New York Knickerbockers. This was the first NBA All-Star Game held in New York City. Joe Lapchick of the Knickerbockers coached the Eastern Division and John Kundla of the Minneapolis Lakers coached the Western Division, as the Knickerbockers and Lakers had led their respective divisions entering the game. The attendance was 16,487.

The Eastern Division held an 84–82 edge with only seconds remaining in the game. Then, George Mikan of the Lakers was fouled. Mikan proceeded to make both foul shots, which sent the game into overtime.

In the extra period, Eastern Division's Bob Cousy scored 10 points to secure a 98–93 victory. The Western Division's Jim Pollard, the game's high scorer with 23 points, had been named game's Most Valuable Player (MVP) in a vote taken before regulation time had run out. However, another ballot was taken and Cousy was finally named the game MVP.

It was the first NBA All-Star Game to be decided in overtime. Despite such fact, it was the last All-Star Game in which neither side reached 100 points.

== Roster ==
Eastern All-Stars
Pos.	Player	Team	No. of selections
Starters
G	Bob Cousy	Boston Celtics	4th
C	Ray Felix	Baltimore Bullets	1st
C/F	Ed Macauley	Boston Celtics	4th
G	Dick McGuire	New York Knickerbockers	3rd
F/C	Dolph Schayes	Syracuse Nationals	4th
Reserves
G/F	Carl Braun	New York Knickerbockers	2nd
F/C	Harry Gallatin	New York Knickerbockers	4th
C	Neil Johnston	Philadelphia Warriors	2nd
G/F	Paul Seymour	Syracuse Nationals	2nd
G	Bill Sharman	Boston Celtics	2nd
Head coach: Joe Lapchick (New York Knicks)

Western All-Stars
Pos.	Player	Team	No. of selections
Starters
F/C	Mel Hutchins	Fort Wayne Pistons	2nd
G	Slater Martin	Minneapolis Lakers	2nd
C	George Mikan	Minneapolis Lakers	4th
F	Jim Pollard	Minneapolis Lakers	3rd
G	Bobby Wanzer	Rochester Royals	3rd
Reserves
G	Bob Davies	Rochester Royals	4th
C/F	Larry Foust	Fort Wayne Pistons	4th
F	Jack Molinas	Fort Wayne Pistons	1st
G	Andy Phillip	Fort Wayne Pistons	4th
C	Arnie Risen	Rochester Royals	3rd
G/F	Don Sunderlage	Milwaukee Hawks	1st
Head coach:John Kundla (Minneapolis Lakers)

== Eastern Division ==
Legend
	Starter		MVP	MIN	Minutes played
FG	Field goals	FGA	Field goal attempts	FT	Free throws	FTA	Free throw attempts
REB	Rebounds	AST	Assists	PF	Personal fouls	PTS	Points

Player	Team	MIN	FG	FGA	FT	FTA	REB	AST	PF	PTS
Bob Cousy	Boston Celtics	34	6	15	8	8	11	4	1	20
Ray Felix	Baltimore Bullets	32	4	8	5	5	11	1	4	13
Ed Macauley	Boston Celtics	25	4	11	5	6	1	3	2	13
Dolph Schayes	Syracuse Nationals	24	1	3	4	6	12	1	1	6
Dick McGuire	New York Knickerbockers	24	2	5	0	0	4	2	1	4
Bill Sharman	Boston Celtics	30	6	9	2	4	2	3	3	14
Carl Braun	New York Knickerbockers	29	4	8	1	1	4	2	3	9
Harry Gallatin	New York Knicks	28	0	2	5	6	18	3	0	5
Neil Johnston	Philadelphia Warriors	20	2	9	2	4	7	2	1	6
Paul Seymour	Syracuse Nationals	19	2	6	4	4	1	3	2	8
Totals		265	31	76	36	44	71	24	18	98

== Western Division ==
Player	Team	MIN	FG	FGA	FT	FTA	REB	AST	PF	PTS
Jim Pollard	Minneapolis Lakers	41	10	22	3	5	3	3	3	23
Bobby Wanzer	Rochester Royals	36	5	13	2	3	2	6	6	12
George Mikan	Minneapolis Lakers	31	6	18	6	8	9	1	5	18
Mel Hutchins	Fort Wayne Pistons	31	1	8	1	2	4	2	5	3
Slater Martin	Minneapolis Lakers	23	1	5	0	0	0	3	3	2
Bob Davies	Rochester Royals	31	8	16	2	3	5	5	4	18
Larry Foust	Fort Wayne Pistons	27	1	9	1	1	15	0	1	3
Arnie Risen	Rochester Royals	20	4	10	0	1	7	0	5	8
Andy Phillip	Fort Wayne Pistons	19	1	4	0	1	3	3	1	2
Don Sunderlage	Milwaukee Hawks	6	1	2	2	2	0	1	1	4
Jack Molinas (Note: Jack Molinas was suspended and ultimately banned from the NBA for life after 32 games into his playing career for betting on games while playing college basketball at Columbia University.)	Fort Wayne Pistons	suspended – replaced by Andy Phillip								
Totals		265	38	107	17	26	48	24	34	93
