= Don Sunderlage =

American basketball player (1929–1961)

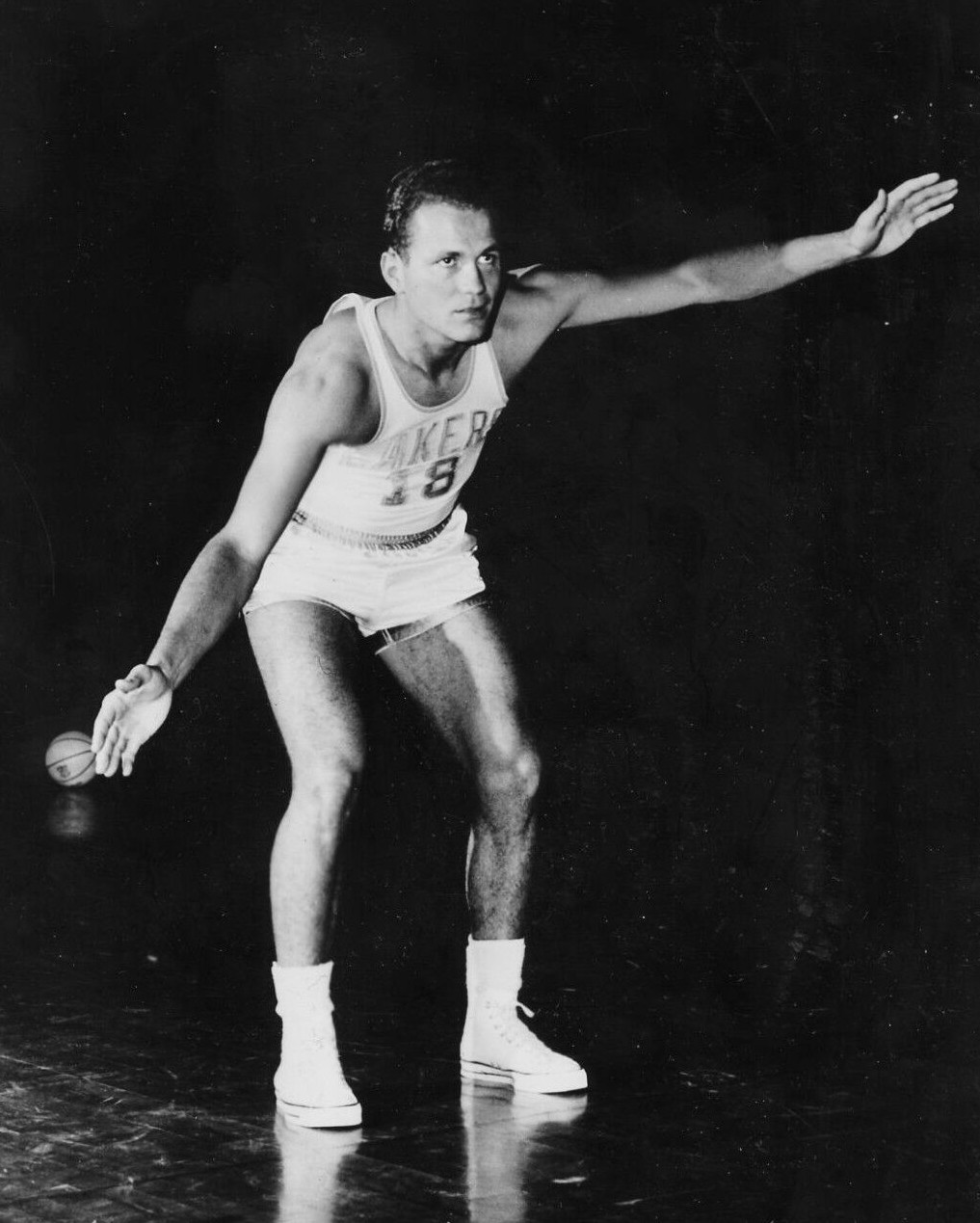
- Sunderlage in 1956

Personal information
- Born: December 20, 1929 Roselle, Illinois, U.S.
- Died: July 15, 1961 (aged 31) Lake Geneva, Wisconsin, U.S.
- Listed height: 6 ft 1 in (1.85 m)
- Listed weight: 180 lb (82 kg)

Career information
- High school: Elgin (Elgin, Illinois)
- College: Illinois (1948–1951)
- NBA draft: 1951: 1st round, 9th overall pick
- Drafted by: Philadelphia Warriors
- Playing career: 1953–1955
- Position: Point guard
- Number: 11, 18

Career history
- 1953–1954: Milwaukee Hawks
- 1954–1955: Minneapolis Lakers

Career highlights
- NBA All-Star (1954); Third-team All-American – UPI (1951)

Career NBA statistics
- Points: 874 (7.7 ppg)
- Rebounds: 281 (2.5 rpg)
- Assists: 224 (2.0 apg)
- Stats at NBA.com
- Stats at Basketball Reference

Don J. Sunderlage (December 20, 1929 – July 15, 1961) was an American basketball player.

A 6'1" point guard from Roselle, Illinois, Sunderlage played collegiately at the University of Illinois, earning the Chicago Tribune Silver Basketball award in 1951. From 1953 to 1955, he played in the National Basketball Association as a member of the Milwaukee Hawks and Minneapolis Lakers. He averaged 7.7 points per game in his career and represented the Hawks at the 1954 NBA All-Star Game.

== High school ==
A native of Roselle, Illinois, Sunderlage attended Elgin High School from 1943–44 to 1946–47. He was a 6 ft 1 in (1.85 m) guard who led his team to a Big 8 Conference championship while setting the Elgin High School scoring record of 359 points during the 1946–47 season. Following his senior season, Sunderlage was selected to play in a North-South All Star game where he was the high scorer for the North. In two varsity seasons, Sunderlage's Elgin Maroons teams won 35 games while only losing 6 (win pct=85.3%).

In 1973, Sunderlage was inducted into the Illinois Basketball Coaches Association's Hall of Fame as a player.

== College ==
In the fall of 1947, Sunderlage enrolled at the University of Illinois and was a member of the freshman basketball team. In his sophomore year he was the starting point guard of the 1948-49 Fighting Illini team that finished first in the Big Nine with a 21–4 record and advanced to the NCAA Tournament. Illinois defeated Yale to earn a berth in the Final Four (only eight teams played in the tournament back then), but lost to eventual national champion Kentucky, 76–47. They defeated Oregon State in the third place game, however. This was Illinois’ first 20-game winning team since 1908 which equaled a final AP ranking of No. 4 in the nation.

The 1949–50 season was the worst of Sunderlage's three varsity seasons of Illini basketball. The absence of Dike Eddleman's 329 points from the previous season left the Illini with a fourth-place finish in the conference at 7 wins and 5 losses while finishing the regular season with an overall record of 14 wins and 8 losses. After the season, Sunderlage was named captain for the following season on a team that added future All-Americans Jim Bredar and Irv Bemoras. Even with the lack of overall success by the team, Sunderlage won the Ralph Woods Memorial Free Throw trophy in 1950

Unlike the previous season, the 1950–51 campaign was the best of Sunderlage's time at Illinois. A 13 win conference season marked only the second time since 1942 that the Fighting Illini men's basketball team had completed that feat. Head coach Harry Combes had guided his team to a Big Ten championship, a third-place finish in the 1951 NCAA Men's Division I Basketball Tournament and a final AP ranking of No. 5 in the nation. The 1950–51 team compiled an overall record of 22 wins and 5 losses with a conference record of 13 wins and 1 loss. During the tournament, Illinois beat Columbia, 79–71, and North Carolina State, 84–70, to get to the national semifinals and a rematch with the Kentucky Wildcats, which had downed the Illini in the national semifinals in 1949. In a heart-breaking loss, Kentucky nipped Illinois, 76–74. The Illini collected third place nationally by beating Oklahoma A&M, 61–46, in Minneapolis. Along with Sunderlage, the team included and Ted Beach, Rodney Fletcher, Irving Bemoras, Robert Peterson and Mack Follmer.

After the completion of his senior season, Sunderlage was named the Most Valuable Player of the Big Ten Conference and honored with the Chicago Tribune Silver Basketball award. He was also a Helms 2nd team All-American, a Sporting News 2nd team All-American, a United Press International 3rd team All-American, a Converse 3rd team All-American and an Associated Press Honorable Mention All-American. In addition to his other honors, Sunderlage was the first Illinois player to score more than 400 points in a season (471 in 1951). In his three years of varsity basketball, Sunderlage played in 74 games while scoring 777 points for an average of 10.5 points per game. His teams won 57 games while losing only 17 (win pct=77.0%).

In 2008, Sunderlage was honored as one of the thirty-three honored jerseys which hang in the State Farm Center to show regard for being the most decorated basketball players in the University of Illinois' history.

== Professional basketball ==
After leaving the University of Illinois, Sunderlage played professionally for two seasons in the National Basketball Association. He was selected in the 1951 NBA draft by the Philadelphia Warriors in the first round. He never ended up playing for them, however, as he was traded for Mark Workman to the Milwaukee Hawks on November 19, 1952, just as the 1953–54 NBA season began. An additional misfortune for Sunderlage was that he was required to serve a year in the military, pushing his start in the NBA back a season. He played in 68 games and averaged over 11 points per game for the Hawks and was a coaches selection for the 1954 NBA All-Star Game. In September 1954, Sunderlage was again traded, this time to the Minneapolis Lakers. He played in 45 games for the Lakers during the 1954–55 NBA season but his minutes and scoring were drastically reduced from his previous season and on July 1, 1955, he was released from his contract.

== Personal life & death ==
Sunderlage was the son of Alfred Henry Sunderlage and Hulda Louise Minnie Sunderlage and married Mary "Janice" Newby. Their marriage resulted in the birth of one son.

On July 15, 1961, Sunderlage and his wife died following a car accident in Lake Geneva, Wisconsin.

== Honors ==
- 1951 - First-team All-Big Ten
- 1951 - Team MVP and Captain
- 1951 - All-American
- 1951 - Earned the Chicago Tribune's Silver Basketball award
- 1951 - Big Ten Player of the Year
- 1951 - University of Illinois Athlete of the Year
- 1973 - Inducted into the Illinois Basketball Coaches Association's Hall of Fame as a player.
- 2008 - Honored jersey which hangs in the State Farm Center to show regard for being the most decorated basketball players in the University of Illinois' history.

== Statistics ==
=== College basketball ===
Season	Games	Points	PPG	Big Ten Record	Overall Record	Highlight
1948–49	25	153	6.1	10–2	21–4	-
1949–50	22	153	7.0	7–5	14–8	-
1950–51	27	471	17.4	13–1	22–5	Big Ten Player of the Year
**Totals**	**74**	**777**	**10.5**	**30–8**	**57–17**	

=== NBA career statistics ===
Legend
GP	Games played	GS	Games started	MPG	Minutes per game
FG%	Field goal percentage	3P%	3-point field goal percentage	FT%	Free throw percentage
RPG	Rebounds per game	APG	Assists per game	SPG	Steals per game
BPG	Blocks per game	PPG	Points per game	**Bold**	Career high

=== Regular season ===
Year	Team	GP	MPG	FG%	FT%	RPG	APG	PPG
1953–54	Milwaukee	**68**	**32.8**	**.340**	**.748**	**3.3**	**2.8**	**11.2**
1954–55	Minneapolis	45	9.0	.248	.658	1.2	0.8	2.5
Career		113	23.3	.326	.732	2.5	2.0	7.7
