= 1953 NCAA Men's Basketball All-Americans =

- Awarded for: 1952–53 NCAA men's basketball season

The consensus 1953 NCAA Men's Basketball All-American team, as determined by aggregating the results of six major All-American teams. To earn "consensus" status, a player must win honors from a majority of the following teams: the Associated Press, Look Magazine, The United Press International, the Newspaper Enterprise Association (NEA), Collier's Magazine and the International News Service.

== 1953 Consensus All-America team ==
Consensus First Team
Player	Position	Class	Team
Ernie Beck	F	Senior	Penn
Walter Dukes	C	Senior	Seton Hall
Tom Gola	F	Sophomore	La Salle
Bob Houbregs	F	Senior	Washington
Johnny O'Brien	G	Senior	Seattle

Consensus Second Team
Player	Position	Class	Team
Dick Knostman	F	Senior	Kansas State
Bob Pettit	C	Junior	Louisiana State
Joe Richey	G	Senior	Brigham Young
Don Schlundt	C	Sophomore	Indiana
Frank Selvy	G	Junior	Furman

== Individual All-America teams ==
All-America Team
All-America Team	First team		Second team		Third team	
All-America Team	Player	School	Player	School	Player	School
Associated Press	Ernie Beck	Penn	Paul Ebert	Ohio State	Jim Bredar	Illinois
Associated Press	Walter Dukes	Seton Hall	Dick Knostman	Kansas State	Bevo Francis	Rio Grande
Associated Press	Tom Gola	La Salle	Bob Pettit	Louisiana State	Larry Hennessy	Villanova
Associated Press	Bob Houbregs	Washington	Don Schlundt	Indiana	Bobby Leonard	Indiana
Associated Press	Johnny O'Brien	Seattle	Frank Selvy	Furman	Bob Speight	North Carolina State
UPI	Ernie Beck	Penn	Bevo Francis	Rio Grande	Paul Ebert	Ohio State
UPI	Walter Dukes	Seton Hall	Dick Knostman	Kansas State	Ron Feiereisel	DePaul
UPI	Tom Gola	La Salle	Bob Pettit	Louisiana State	Larry Hennessy	Villanova
UPI	Bob Houbregs	Washington	Don Schlundt	Indiana	Chuck Mencel	Minnesota
UPI	Johnny O'Brien	Seattle	Frank Selvy	Furman	Eddie O'Brien	Seattle
Look Magazine	Ernie Beck	Penn	Irv Bemoras	Illinois	No third team	
Look Magazine	Walter Dukes	Seton Hall	Paul Ebert	Ohio State	No third team	
Look Magazine	Bob Houbregs	Washington	Tom Gola	La Salle	No third team	
Look Magazine	Dick Knostman	Kansas State	Bob Pettit	Louisiana State	No third team	
Look Magazine	Johnny O'Brien	Seattle	Joe Richey	Brigham Young	No third team	
NEA	Walter Dukes	Seton Hall	Ernie Beck	Penn	No third team	
NEA	Tom Gola	La Salle	Bob Pettit	Louisiana State	No third team	
NEA	Bob Houbregs	Washington	Dick Ricketts	Duquesne	No third team	
NEA	Dick Knostman	Kansas State	Don Schlundt	Indiana	No third team	
NEA	Johnny O'Brien	Seattle	Gene Schwinger	Rice	No third team	
International News Service	Walter Dukes	Seton Hall	Ernie Beck	Penn	No third team	
International News Service	Tom Gola	La Salle	Jim Bredar	Illinois	No third team	
International News Service	Bob Houbregs	Washington	Dick Knostman	Kansas State	No third team	
International News Service	Johnny O'Brien	Seattle	Bob Pettit	Louisiana State	No third team	
International News Service	Don Schlundt	Indiana	Joe Richey	Brigham Young	No third team	
Collier's	Ernie Beck	Penn	Dick Knostman	Kansas State	No third team	
Collier's	Walter Dukes	Seton Hall	Bob Pettit	Louisiana State	No third team	
Collier's	Tom Gola	La Salle	Joe Richey	Brigham Young	No third team	
Collier's	Bob Houbregs	Washington	Don Schlundt	Indiana	No third team	
Collier's	Johnny O'Brien	Seattle	Bob Speight	North Carolina State	No third team	

AP Honorable Mention:

- Irv Bemoras, Illinois
- B. H. Born, Kansas
- Don Bragg, UCLA
- John Clune, Navy
- Ron Feiereisel, DePaul
- Ken Flower, Southern California
- Dickie Hemric, Wake Forest
- Cob Jarvis, Mississippi
- Johnny Kerr, Illinois
- Tom Marshall, Western Kentucky
- Bob Mattick, Oklahoma A&M
- Bob McKeen, California
- Chuck Mencel, Minnesota
- Jack Molinas, Columbia
- Zippy Morocco, Georgia
- Togo Palazzi, Holy Cross
- Joe Richey, Brigham Young
- Dick Ricketts, Duquesne
- Arnold Short, Oklahoma City
- Art Spoelstra, Western Kentucky

== See also ==
- 1952–53 NCAA men's basketball season
