= Jim Bredar =

American basketball player (1931–1997)

Personal information
- Born: October 22, 1931 Chicago, Illinois, U.S.
- Died: August 28, 1997 (aged 65) Owensboro, Kentucky, U.S.
- Listed height: 5 ft 10 in (1.78 m)
- Listed weight: 170 lb (77 kg)

Career information
- High school: Salem Community (Salem, Illinois)
- College: Illinois (1950–1953)
- NBA draft: 1953: – round, –
- Drafted by: Fort Wayne Pistons
- Position: Guard
- Number: 19

Career highlights
- Second-team All-American – INS (1953); Third-team All-American – AP (1953); Second-team All-Big Ten (1953)
- Stats at Basketball Reference

James A. Bredar (October 22, 1931 – August 28, 1997) was an All-American basketball player at the University of Illinois during a career that spanned from 1949 to 1953, and then was drafted by the Ft. Wayne Pistons of the National Basketball Association in the 1953 draft.

== High school ==
A native of Salem, Illinois, Bredar attended Salem Community High School from 1945–46 to 1948–49. He was a 5 ft 11 in (1.80 m) guard who led the Wildcats in scoring with 422 points as a senior, averaging 15.6 points per game and was named to the all-conference basketball team.

== College ==
Bredar chose to play basketball at Illinois after high school. He spent his first season on the freshman team, moving to the varsity squad as a sophomore. Bredar played in 68 of the 75 games during the next three years as an Illini, starting at guard for the final two seasons.

=== 1950–51 season ===
In his sophomore season of 1950–51, the Fighting Illini won the Big Ten Conference title and advanced to the NCAA Tournament. Illinois would defeat Columbia (ranked #3) and North Carolina State (ranked #8) to earn a berth in the Final Four (only 16 teams played in the tournament back then), but would lose to eventual national champion Kentucky (ranked #1) 74–76 in the national semifinals. They would defeat Oklahoma A&M (ranked #14), 61–46 in the third place game held at Williams Arena in Minneapolis, Minnesota.

=== 1951–52 season ===
The following season, Bredar's Fighting Illini team would win the Big Ten Conference Championship and advance to the NCAA Tournament. Illinois would defeat Dayton (ranked #11) and Duquesne (ranked #4) to earn back-to-back Final Four appearances. The Illini would not have to meet Kentucky this season due to the fact that St. Johns (ranked #10) would defeat them in the second round. Unfortunately for Bredar and the Illini, they too would be defeated by St. John's in the national semifinals by a score of 59–61. They would finish the season in third place for the second straight year, defeating Santa Clara, 67–64 at Hec Edmundson Pavilion in Seattle.

Bredar and teammate Johnny Kerr would be named to the NCAA Final Four All-Tournament Team following the completion of the tournament. Only two other Illini players have ever been named to this team, Luther Head and Deron Williams in 2005.

=== 1952–53 season ===
As a senior, Bredar was honored by being named the team captain for the season. After the season, he was dubbed an All-American and was also named to the All-Big Ten 2nd team. During his career as a Fighting Illini, every team had both winning conference and overall records, finishing with a combined conference record of 39–7 and an unbelievable overall record of 62–13. If it weren't for the national champion Indiana Hoosiers, Bredar would most likely have been on an Illini team that would have won three consecutive Big Ten championships.

=== College honors ===
- Converse Honorable Mention All-American (1952)
- United Press Honorable Mention All-American (1952)
- Converse 2nd team All-American (1953)
- International News Service 2nd team All-American (1953)
- Look Magazine 2nd team All-American(1953)
- Helms 2nd team All-American (1953)
- Associated Press 3rd team All-American (1953)
- Second-team All-Big Ten (1953)
- NCAA All-Tournament team (1952)

=== College statistics ===
Season	Games	Points	PPG	Big Ten Record	Overall Record	Postseason
1950–51	20	34	1.7	13–1	22–5	NCAA Final Four
1951–52	26	260	10	12–2	22–4	NCAA Final Four
1952–53	22	262	11.9	14–4	18–4	—
Totals	68	556	8.2	39–07	62–13	2 appearances

== Professional career and later life ==
Bredar was drafted by the Ft. Wayne Pistons of the NBA, however; he joined former Illini teammate Bill Erickson and toured with the Harlem Globetrotters as a member of the team which provided the opposition for the Globetrotters in their exhibitions.

Bredar then spent two years in the Army. Upon his return, he re-enrolled as a graduate student at the University of Illinois in order to get his master's degree in geology. While working on his Master's he helped Illinois coach Harry Combes and former assistant coach, Howie Braun, coach and did some scouting and recruiting. He was also head freshman coach for two years.
