= Tilden High School (Chicago) =

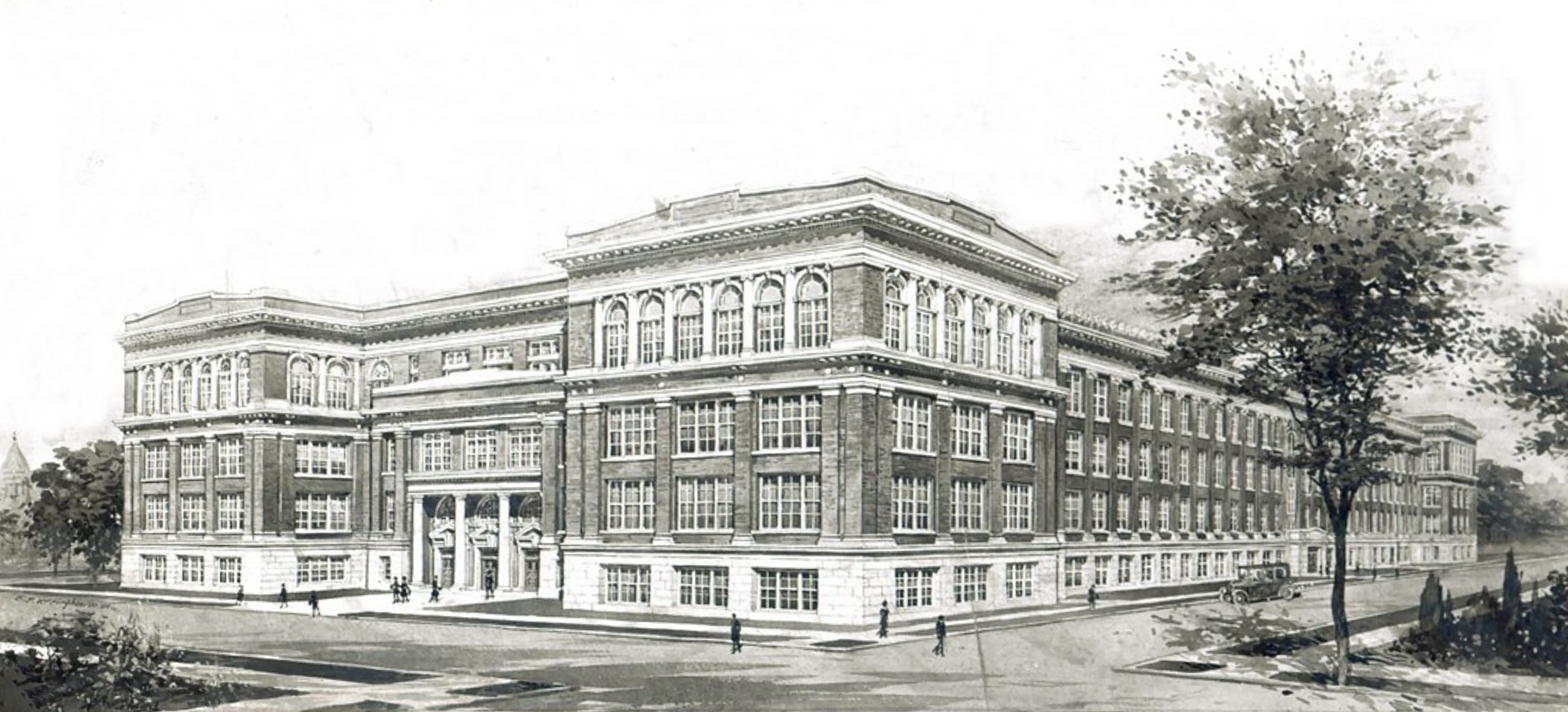
- School illustration by A. F. Hussander

Location
- 4747 S. Union Avenue; Chicago, Illinois 60609; United States; 41.8075°N 87.6425°W

Information
- Former name: Lake High School
- School type: Public Secondary
- Established: 1881
- School district: Chicago Public Schools
- CEEB code: 141320
- Principal: Dawn Ramos
- Grades: 9–12
- Gender: Coed
- Enrollment: 281 (2016–17)
- Campus type: Urban
- Colors: Blue; Gold
- Athletics conference: Chicago Public League
- Nickname: Blue Devils
- Accreditation: North Central Association of Colleges and Schools
- Website: tilden.cps.edu
- Building details

General information
- Year built: 1904–1905
- Cost: 7 million dollars

Design and construction
- Architect: Dwight H. Perkins

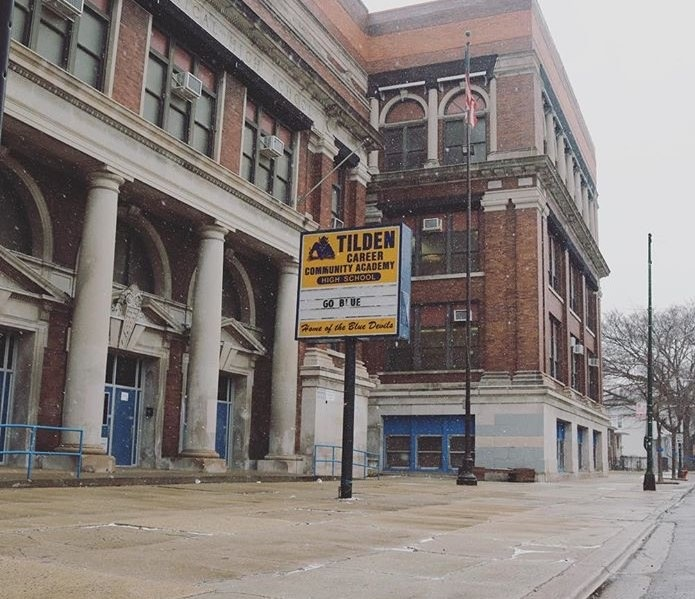
Tilden High School (2016)

Edward Tilden Career Community Academy High School (formerly known as Tilden Technical High School) is a public four-year high school bordered between the Canaryville and Fuller Park neighborhoods on the south side of Chicago, Illinois, United States. Opened in Chicago as Lake High School in 1889, Tilden is operated by the Chicago Public Schools district.

== History ==
The school was founded as Lake High School; located in Lake Township, Cook County, in 1881. In 1889, Lake Township was annexed to the City of Chicago, and the school became part of the Chicago Public Schools (CPS) system. Several years after being added to the district, The Chicago Board of Education decided that a new building was need for the school; approving a 7 million dollar budget for construction of the new school in 1901. The new school, located on South Union Avenue and West 47th Place, was designed by Dwight H. Perkins and constructed between March 1904 and August 1905. In 1915, the school was renamed Edward Tilden High School, honoring the recently deceased banker and former president of the Chicago Board of Education. In 1919, the school board decided that Tilden would no longer serve as a regular high school and would become an all–boys "technical" high school, forcing students who didn't want a technical education to transfer to other schools such as Lindblom and Englewood high schools. In 1960, the school was changed into a co–educational neighborhood high school.

== Athletics ==
Tilden competes in the Chicago Public League (CPL) and is a member of the Illinois High School Association (IHSA). Tilden sport teams are nicknamed Blue Devils. The boys' basketball team were public league champions three times (1945–46, 1948–49, 1949–50) and regional champions three times (2011–12, 2012–13, 2015–16). The boys' wrestling team placed first in the state in the 1945–46 and 1951–52 seasons and were public league champions thirteen times (1938–39, 1939–40, 1961–69, 1969–70, 1972–73, 1974–75, 1980–81, 1984–85); ranking Class AA three times (1975, 1981 and 1985). The boys' track and field team were Class AA two times (1978–79, 1982–83).

== Other information ==
=== Racial Incidents/Gang Violence ===
On September 28, 1968, a violent clash between black and white students occurred when black students walked out of classes after a school pep rally was cancelled. Black and white members of neighborhood street gangs gathered in front of the school and began fighting; which resulted in a 16 year old white student being shot. On April 25, 1969, a 17-year-old student was shot when a racially motivated brawl erupted involving white and black students at the school. The brawl began in the school's auditorium and continued outside the school building. Eight Chicago police officers were injured and six students were charged with disorderly conduct in the incident. Black students staged a 2–week walkout charging white racism at the school from the April 25th incident until May 8. On November 20, 1992, 15 year old freshmen student DeLondyn Lawson was shot to death in a gang–related shooting on the school's second floor shortly after 10 a.m. by another student, 16 year old gang member Joseph White. White wounded two other students in the shooting. Joseph White was sentenced to 45 years in prison.

== Notable alumni ==
- Mose Bashaw, (Class of 1906) – American NFL football player.
- Hugo Bezdek, (Class of 1902) – NCAA athletics coach; 1954 inductee into the College Football Hall of Fame
- Jim Browne, (Class of 1948) – BAA/NBA basketball player
- Fred Hampton Jr. (born 1969) – political activist
- Johnny "Red" Kerr, (Class of 1950) – American NBA basketball player with the University of Illinois and Syracuse Nationals; later coached the Chicago Bulls and served as a color commentator on the Bulls' television broadcasts
- Nick Kladis, (Class of 1949) – basketball player with Loyola University (1949–52) and the Syracuse Nationals, part-owner of baseball's St. Louis Cardinals, member of Chicagoland Sports Hall of Fame
- Ralph McGehee, (Class of 1946), Notre Dame football player and Central Intelligence Agency case officer known for his autobiographical indictment of the CIA, Deadly Deceits.
- Ralph Metcalfe, (Class of 1930) – sprinter at Marquette University and four-time Olympic medalist; Chicago alderman and four-term U.S. Congressman.
- Ed Mieszkowski, (Class of 1941) – American NFL football player.
- Johnny Ostrowski, (Class of 1936) – American MLB player (Chicago Cubs, Boston Red Sox, Chicago White Sox, Washington Senators).
- Bill Pinkney (sailor), (Class of 1954) – First African-American to solo circumnavigate the Earth in a sail boat.
- Bob Ryland, (Class of 1940) – African American professional tennis player
- Mike Swistowicz, (Class of 1945) – American NFL player (New York Yanks).
- Chico Walker, (Class of 1977) – American MLB baseball player; (Chicago Cubs), (Boston Red Sox), California Angels and (New York Mets). Walker played on the baseball team which played for the city public league championship at Comiskey Park during the 1974–75 season.
