= Irv Bemoras =

American basketball player

- Bemoras from The Illio, 1953

Personal information
- Born: November 18, 1930 Chicago, Illinois, U.S.
- Died: November 1, 2007 (aged 76) Buffalo Grove, Illinois, U.S.
- Listed height: 6 ft 3 in (1.91 m)
- Listed weight: 185 lb (84 kg)

Career information
- High school: Marshall (Chicago, Illinois)
- College: Illinois (1950–1953)
- NBA draft: 1953: 3rd round, 18th overall pick
- Drafted by: Milwaukee Hawks
- Playing career: 1953–1957
- Position: Small forward
- Number: 7, 26

Career history
- 1953–1957: Milwaukee / St. Louis Hawks

Career highlights
- Second-team All-American – Look (1953)

Career statistics
- Points: 827 (6.3 ppg)
- Rebounds: 341 (2.6 rpg)
- Assists: 125 (1.0 apg)
- Stats at NBA.com
- Stats at Basketball Reference

Irving Bemoras (November 18, 1930 – November 1, 2007) was an American basketball player.

He played collegiately for the University of Illinois at Urbana–Champaign, where he was voted as one of the top 100 players of all time.

He was selected by the Milwaukee Hawks in the 1953 NBA draft. He played for the Milwaukee Hawks in 1953-54 and the relocated St. Louis Hawks in 1956-57 in the NBA for 131 games.

He is a member of the Chicagoland Sports Hall of Fame.

== Family ==
Irv Bemoras and Sally, his wife for over 50 years, had three children and six grandchildren.

== Career statistics ==
Legend
GP	Games played	GS	Games started	MPG	Minutes per game
FG%	Field goal percentage	3P%	3-point field goal percentage	FT%	Free throw percentage
RPG	Rebounds per game	APG	Assists per game	SPG	Steals per game
BPG	Blocks per game	PPG	Points per game	**Bold**	Career high

=== NBA ===
==== Regular season ====
Year	Team	GP	MPG	FG%	FT%	RPG	APG	PPG
1953–54	Milwaukee	**69**	**21.7**	**.366**	.668	**3.1**	**1.1**	**7.4**
1956–57	St. Louis	62	15.9	.322	**.680**	2.0	.7	5.1
Career		131	18.9	.347	.672	2.6	1.0	6.3

==== Playoffs ====
Year	Team	GP	MPG	FG%	FT%	RPG	APG	PPG
1957	St. Louis	3	6.7	.375	1.000	2.0	.3	3.0
