= 1975–76 Duke Blue Devils men's basketball team =

American college basketball season

1975–76 Duke Blue Devils men's basketball
- Conference: Atlantic Coast Conference
- Record: 13–14 (3–9 ACC)
- Head coach: Bill Foster
- Home arena: Cameron Indoor Stadium

1975–76 ACC men's basketball standings
	Conf.				Overall
Team	W		L	PCT	W		L	PCT
No. 8 North Carolina	11	–	1	.917	25	–	4	.862
No. 11 Maryland	7	–	5	.583	22	–	6	.786
NC State	7	–	5	.583	21	–	9	.700
Clemson	5	–	7	.417	18	–	10	.643
Wake Forest	5	–	7	.417	17	–	10	.630
No. 18 Virginia †	4	–	8	.333	18	–	12	.600
Duke	3	–	9	.250	13	–	14	.481
† 1976 ACC tournament winner Rankings from AP Poll

The 1975–76 Duke Blue Devils men's basketball team represented Duke University in the 1975-76 NCAA Division I men's basketball season. The head coach was Bill Foster and the team finished the season with an overall record of 13–14 and did not qualify for the NCAA tournament.

== Schedule ==
Date time, TV	Rank^{#}	Opponent^{#}	Result	Record	Site city, state
November 29*; 7:30 p.m.		Johns Hopkins	W 103–72	1–0	Cameron Indoor Stadium (4,800); Durham, NC
December 3*; 7:30 p.m.		No. 8 Tennessee	L 80–86	1–1	Cameron Indoor Stadium (7,850); Durham, NC
December 6; 7:30 p.m.		Virginia	W 81–79	2–1	Cameron Indoor Stadium (7,600); Durham, NC
December 10*; 7:30 p.m.		East Carolina	W 93–74	3–1	Cameron Indoor Stadium (6,250); Durham, NC
December 26*; 7:00 p.m.		vs. Auburn; Holiday Doubleheader	W 85–74	4–1	Reynolds Coliseum (6,400); Raleigh, NC
December 27*; 7:00 p.m.		vs. Western Kentucky; Holiday Doubleheader	W 111–90	5–1	Reynolds Coliseum (6,600); Raleigh, NC
December 30*; 7:30 p.m.		Vermont	W 94–77	6–1	Cameron Indoor Stadium (6,100); Durham, NC
January 2*; 7:00 p.m.		vs. No. 9 NC State; Big Four Tournament	L 95–104	6–2	Greensboro Coliseum (15,521); Greensboro, NC
January 3*; 7:00 p.m.		vs. No. 3 North Carolina; Big Four Tournament	L 74–77	6–3	Greensboro Coliseum (15,509); Greensboro, NC
January 7*; 7:30 p.m.		at Tulane	L 82–92	6–4	Tulane Gymnasium (2,500); New Orleans, LA
January 9*; 8:00 p.m.		at Georgia Tech	W 91–71	7–4	Alexander Memorial Coliseum (3,037); Atlanta, GA
January 14; 7:30 p.m.		at Clemson	L 96–102 ^{OT}	7–5	Littlejohn Coliseum (10,200); Clemson, SC
January 17; 2:00 p.m.		No. 7 North Carolina; Rivalry	L 87–89	7–6	Cameron Indoor Stadium (8,010); Durham, NC
January 19*; 7:30 p.m.		vs. Virginia Tech	W 79–72	8–6	Greensboro Coliseum (4,002); Greensboro, NC
January 21; 8:00 p.m.		Wake Forest	W 97–93 ^{OT}	9–6	Cameron Indoor Stadium (7,975); Durham, NC
January 24; 2:00 p.m.		at No. 11 NC State	L 101–106	9–7	Reynolds Coliseum (11,950); Raleigh, NC
January 27*; 7:30 p.m.		Davidson	W 94–79	10–7	Cameron Indoor Stadium (4,100); Durham, NC
January 31*; 7:30 p.m.		West Virginia	W 86–77	11–7	Cameron Indoor Stadium (7,800); Durham, NC
February 4; 8:00 p.m.		at Wake Forest	L 87–89	11–8	Winston-Salem Memorial Coliseum (8,180); Winston-Salem, NC
February 7; 3:00 p.m.		at No. 7 Maryland; Rivalry	L 91–102	11–9	Cole Field House (14,500); College Park, MD
February 11; 8:00 p.m.		at Virginia	L 90–94	11–10	University Hall (8,250); Charlottesville, VA
February 14*; 7:15 p.m.		at St. Joseph's	W 85–73	12–10	The Palestra (6,883); Philadelphia, PA
February 18; 7:30 p.m.		No. 12 NC State	L 95–96	12–11	Cameron Indoor Stadium (8,010); Durham, NC
February 21; 7:30 p.m., Mizlou		No. 7 Maryland	W 69–67	13–11	Cameron Indoor Stadium (8,010); Durham, NC
February 25		Clemson	L 89–90	13–12	Cameron Indoor Stadium (8,010); Durham, NC
February 28; 1:00 p.m.		at No. 4 North Carolina	L 71–91	13–13	Carmichael Auditorium (8,800); Chapel Hill, NC
March 4*		vs. No. 9 Maryland; ACC tournament	L 78–80 ^{OT}	13–14	Capital Centre (19,600); Landover, MD
*Non-conference game. ^{#}Rankings from AP Poll. (#) Tournament seedings in parentheses. All times are in Eastern Standard Time.
