= 1980–81 North Carolina Tar Heels men's basketball team =

American college basketball season

1980–81 North Carolina Tar Heels men's basketball

NCAA tournament, Runner-up ACC tournament champions

National Championship Game, L 50-63 vs. Indiana
- Conference: Atlantic Coast Conference

Ranking
- Coaches: No. 6
- AP: No. 6
- Record: 29–8 (10–4 ACC)
- Head coach: Dean Smith (20th season)
- Assistant coaches: Bill Guthridge (14th season); Eddie Fogler (10th season); Roy Williams (3rd season)
- Home arena: Carmichael Auditorium

1980–81 ACC men's basketball standings
	Conf.				Overall
Team	W		L	PCT	W		L	PCT
No. 5 Virginia	13	–	1	.929	29	–	4	.879
No. 6 North Carolina †	10	–	4	.714	29	–	8	.784
No. 11 Wake Forest	9	–	5	.643	22	–	7	.759
No. 18 Maryland	8	–	6	.571	21	–	10	.677
Duke	6	–	8	.429	17	–	13	.567
Clemson	6	–	8	.429	20	–	11	.645
NC State	4	–	10	.286	14	–	13	.519
Georgia Tech	0	–	14	.000	4	–	23	.148
† 1981 ACC tournament winner Rankings from AP Poll

The 1980–81 North Carolina Tar Heels men's basketball team represented University of North Carolina. Led by senior guard-forward Al Wood, it won the 1981 ACC Tournament and reached the championship of the NCAA Tournament, falling to Indiana 63–50. The head coach was Dean Smith. The team played its home games at Carmichael Auditorium in Chapel Hill, North Carolina.

== Roster ==
1980–81 North Carolina Tar Heels men's basketball team
Players
Coaches

Pos.	#	Name	Height	Weight	Year	Hometown
F	43	Jeb Barlow	6 ft 7 in (2.01 m)	207 lb (94 kg)	Jr	Fuquay-Varina, North Carolina
G	21	Jimmy Black	6 ft 2 in (1.88 m)	157 lb (71 kg)	Jr	Bronx, New York
G	24	Jim Braddock	6 ft 1 in (1.85 m)	165 lb (75 kg)	So	Chattanooga, Tennessee
C	45	Chris Brust	6 ft 8 in (2.03 m)	218 lb (99 kg)	Jr	Babylon, New York
C	34	Pete Budko	6 ft 9 in (2.06 m)	226 lb (103 kg)	Sr	Lutherville, Maryland
F	44	Matt Doherty	6 ft 7 in (2.01 m)	208 lb (94 kg)	Fr	East Meadow, New York
G	50	Cecil Exum	6 ft 5 in (1.96 m)	192 lb (87 kg)	Fr	Dudley, North Carolina
F	32	Eric Kenny	6 ft 6 in (1.98 m)	216 lb (98 kg)	Sr	Asheville, North Carolina
C	51	Timo Makkonen	6 ft 11 in (2.11 m)	203 lb (92 kg)	Fr	Lahti, Finland
G	11	Mike Pepper	6 ft 3 in (1.91 m)	184 lb (83 kg)	Sr	Vienna, Virginia
C	41	Sam Perkins	6 ft 9 in (2.06 m)	220 lb (100 kg)	Fr	Latham, New York
G	33	Dean Shaffer	6 ft 4 in (1.93 m)	194 lb (88 kg)	Fr	Durham, North Carolina
F	30	Al Wood	6 ft 6 in (1.98 m)	193 lb (88 kg)	Sr	Gray, Georgia
F	52	James Worthy	6 ft 9 in (2.06 m)	224 lb (102 kg)	So	Gastonia, North Carolina

Head coach

- Dean Smith (Kansas)

Assistant coach(es)

- Bill Guthridge (Kansas State)
- Eddie Fogler (North Carolina)
- Roy Williams (North Carolina)

Legend

- (C) Team captain
- (S) Suspended
- (I) Ineligible
- (W) Walk-on
- Injured
- Current redshirt

== Schedule and results ==
Date time, TV	Rank^{#}	Opponent^{#}	Result	Record	Site city, state
Regular Season
Nov 28, 1980*	No. 13	at Alaska Anchorage; Great Alaska Shootout	W 69–50	1–0	Buckner Fieldhouse; Anchorage, Alaska
Nov 29, 1980*	No. 13	vs. No. 16 Georgetown; Great Alaska Shootout	W 83–71	2–0	Buckner Fieldhouse; Anchorage, Alaska
Nov 30, 1980*	No. 13	vs. No. 20 Arkansas; Great Alaska Shootout	W 64–58	3–0	Buckner Fieldhouse; Anchorage, Alaska
Dec 2, 1980*	No. 10	Mercer	W 89–74	4–0	Carmichael Auditorium; Chapel Hill, North Carolina
Dec 5, 1980*	No. 10	vs. Duke; Big Four Tournament	W 78–76	5–0	Greensboro Coliseum; Greensboro, North Carolina
Dec 6, 1980*	No. 10	vs. Wake Forest; Big Four Tournament	L 71–82	5–1	Greensboro Coliseum; Greensboro, North Carolina
Dec 13, 1980*		South Florida	W 73–64	6–1	Carmichael Auditorium; Chapel Hill, North Carolina
Dec 20, 1980*	No. 8	No. 11 Indiana	W 65–56	7–1	Carmichael Auditorium; Chapel Hill, North Carolina
Dec 22, 1980*		Rutgers	W 71–64	8–1	Carmichael Auditorium; Chapel Hill, North Carolina
Dec 29, 1980*	No. 6	vs. Louisville; Winston Tire Classic	W 86–64	9–1	L.A. Sports Arena; Los Angeles, California
Dec 30, 1980*	No. 6	vs. Minnesota; Winston Tire Classic	L 60–76	9–2	L.A. Sports Arena; Los Angeles, California
Jan 3, 1981*	No. 6	vs. Kansas	L 55–56	9–3	Kemper Arena; Kansas City, Missouri
Jan 7, 1981	No. 16	No. 8 Maryland	W 75–66	10–3 (1–0)	Carmichael Auditorium; Chapel Hill, North Carolina
Jan 10, 1981	No. 16	at No. 3 Virginia	L 57–63	10–4 (1–1)	University Hall; Charlottesville, Virginia
Jan 14, 1981	No. 17	NC State	W 73–70	11–4 (2–1)	Carmichael Auditorium; Chapel Hill, North Carolina
Jan 17, 1981	No. 17	Duke; Rivalry	W 80–65	12–4 (3–1)	Carmichael Auditorium (10,000); Chapel Hill, North Carolina
Jan 22, 1981	No. 17	at No. 3 Wake Forest	W 74–60	13–4 (4–1)	Winston-Salem Memorial Coliseum; Winston-Salem, North Carolina
Jan 24, 1981	No. 17	Georgia Tech	W 100–60	14–4 (5–1)	Carmichael Auditorium; Chapel Hill, North Carolina
Jan 28, 1981	No. 12	at Clemson	W 61–47	15–4 (6–1)	Littlejohn Coliseum; Clemson, South Carolina
Jan 31, 1981	No. 12	at NC State	W 57–54	16–4 (7–1)	Reynolds Coliseum; Raleigh, North Carolina
Feb 3, 1981	No. 11	No. 1 Virginia	L 79–80 ^{OT}	16–5 (7–2)	Carmichael Auditorium (10,000); Chapel Hill, North Carolina
Feb 6, 1981*	No. 11	Saint Joseph's; North-South Doubleheaders	W 87–64	17–5	Charlotte, North Carolina
Feb 7, 1981*	No. 11	Furman; North-South Doubleheaders	W 79–64	18–5	Charlotte, North Carolina
Feb 11, 1981	No. 10	No. 7 Wake Forest	L 68–84	18–6 (7–3)	Carmichael Auditorium; Chapel Hill, North Carolina
Feb 15, 1981	No. 10	at No. 19 Maryland	W 76–63	19–6 (8–3)	Cole Field House; College Park, Maryland
Feb 18, 1981*	No. 13	at William & Mary	W 81–55	20–6	Kaplan Arena; Williamsburg, Virginia
Feb 21, 1981	No. 13	Clemson	W 75–61	21–6 (9–3)	Carmichael Auditorium; Chapel Hill, North Carolina
Feb 25, 1981	No. 11	at Georgia Tech	W 75–61	22–6 (10–3)	Omni Coliseum; Atlanta, Georgia
Feb 28, 1981	No. 11	at Duke	L 65–66 ^{OT}	22–7 (10–4)	Cameron Indoor Stadium; Durham, North Carolina
ACC Tournament
Mar 5, 1981*	(2) No. 12	vs. (7) NC State; Quarterfinals	W 69–54	23–7	Capital Centre; Landover, Maryland
Mar 6, 1981*	(2) No. 12	vs. (3) No. 11 Wake Forest; Semifinals	W 58–57	24–7	Capital Centre; Landover, Maryland
Mar 7, 1981*	(2) No. 12	vs. (4) No. 20 Maryland; Championship game	W 61–60	25–7	Capital Centre; Landover, Maryland
NCAA Tournament
Mar 15, 1981*	(2 W) No. 6	vs. (10 W) Pittsburgh; Second round	W 74–57	26–7	Special Events Center; El Paso, Texas
Mar 19, 1981*	(2 W) No. 6	vs. (3 W) No. 14 Utah; West Regional Semifinal – Sweet Sixteen	W 61–56	27–7	Jon M. Huntsman Center; Salt Lake City, Utah
Mar 21, 1981*	(2 W) No. 6	vs. (8 W) Kansas State; West Regional Final – Elite Eight	W 82–68	28–7	Jon M. Huntsman Center; Salt Lake City, Utah
Mar 28, 1981*	(2 W) No. 6	vs. (1 E) No. 5 Virginia; National Semifinals – Final Four	W 78–65	29–7	The Spectrum; Philadelphia, Pennsylvania
Mar 30, 1981*	(2 W) No. 6	vs. (3 ME) No. 9 Indiana; National Championship	L 50–63	29–8	The Spectrum; Philadelphia, Pennsylvania
*Non-conference game. ^{#}Rankings from AP Poll. (#) Tournament seedings in parentheses. W=West. All times are in Eastern Time.

=== NCAA basketball tournament ===
- West
  - North Carolina 74, Pittsburgh 57
  - North Carolina 61, Utah 56
  - North Carolina 82, Kansas State 68
- Final Four
  - North Carolina 78, Virginia 65
  - Indiana 63, North Carolina 50

== Awards and honors ==
- Sam Perkins, ACC Rookie of the Year

== Team players drafted into the NBA ==
Year	Round	Pick	Player	NBA club
1981	1	4	Al Wood	Atlanta Hawks
1981	5	73	Pete Budko	Dallas Mavericks
1981	6	123	Mike Pepper	San Diego Clippers
1982	1	1	James Worthy	Los Angeles Lakers
1982	3	59	Jimmy Black	New Jersey Nets
1982	6	131	Chris Brust	Denver Nuggets
1982	7	153	Jeb Barlow	Denver Nuggets
1983	5	107	Jim Braddock	Denver Nuggets
1984	1	4	Sam Perkins	Dallas Mavericks
1984	6	118	Matt Doherty	Cleveland Cavaliers
1984	9	194	Cecil Exum	Denver Nuggets
1985	5	104	Dean Shaffer	Washington Bullets
