= 1980–81 Duke Blue Devils men's basketball team =

American college basketball season

1980–81 Duke Blue Devils men's basketball

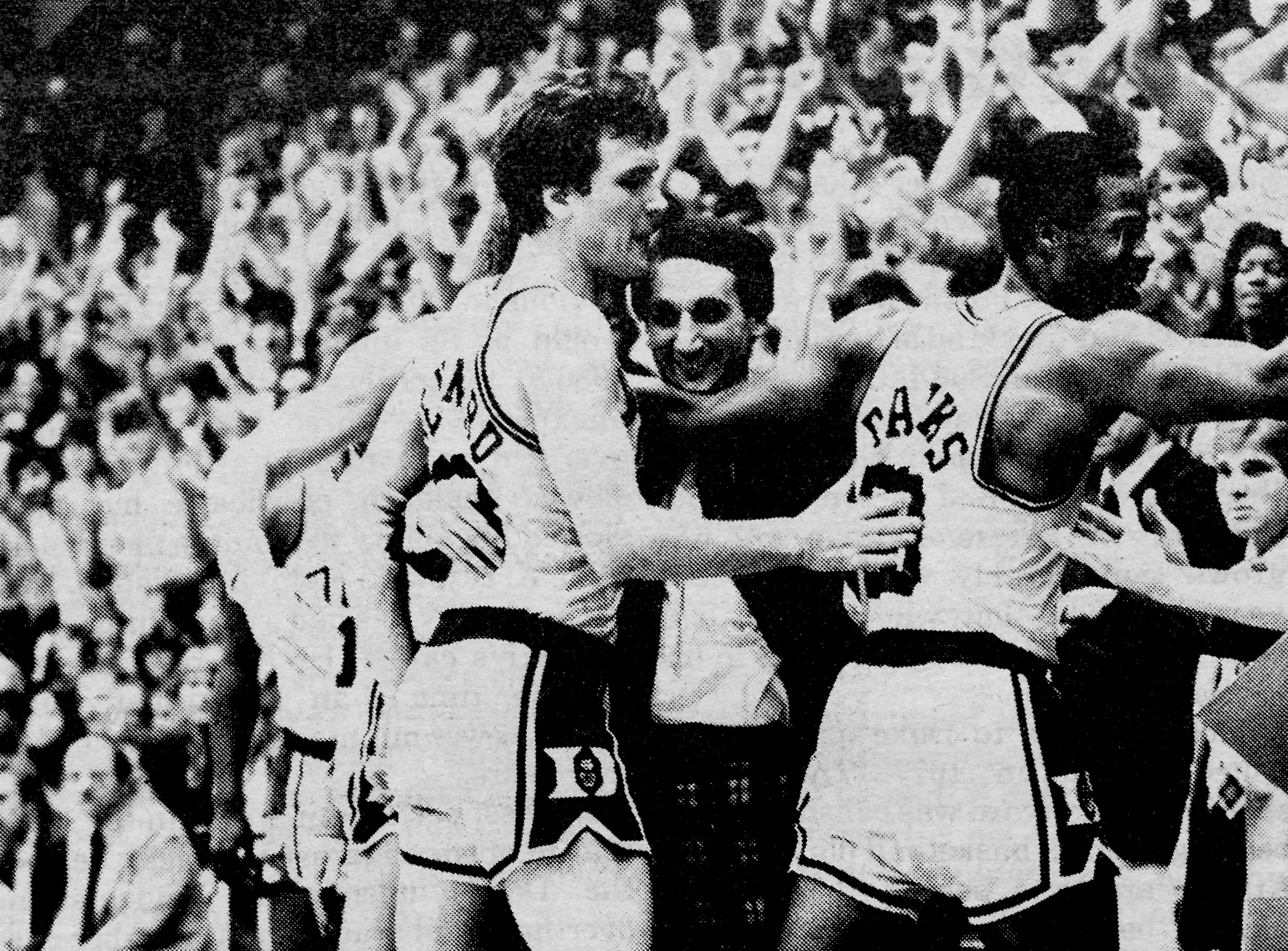
- Kenny Dennard, Coach Krzyzewski and Gene Banks

NIT, Quarterfinals
- Conference: Atlantic Coast Conference
- Record: 17–13 (6–8 ACC)
- Head coach: Mike Krzyzewski (1st season)
- Assistant coach: Chuck Swenson
- Home arena: Cameron Indoor Stadium

1980–81 ACC men's basketball standings
| | Conf. | | | | Overall |
| Team | W | | L | PCT | W | | L | PCT |
|---|---|---|---|---|---|---|---|---|
| No. 5 Virginia | 13 | – | 1 | .929 | 29 | – | 4 | .879 |
| No. 6 North Carolina † | 10 | – | 4 | .714 | 29 | – | 8 | .784 |
| No. 11 Wake Forest | 9 | – | 5 | .643 | 22 | – | 7 | .759 |
| No. 18 Maryland | 8 | – | 6 | .571 | 21 | – | 10 | .677 |
| Duke | 6 | – | 8 | .429 | 17 | – | 13 | .567 |
| Clemson | 6 | – | 8 | .429 | 20 | – | 11 | .645 |
| NC State | 4 | – | 10 | .286 | 14 | – | 13 | .519 |
| Georgia Tech | 0 | – | 14 | .000 | 4 | – | 23 | .148 |
† 1981 ACC tournament winner Rankings from AP Poll

The 1980–81 Duke Blue Devils men's basketball team represented Duke University. The Blue Devils were coached by Mike Krzyzewski in his first year with the team. The club ranked fifth in the ACC. The team played its home games in the Cameron Indoor Stadium in Durham, North Carolina, and was a member of the Atlantic Coast Conference.

== Roster ==
1980–81 Duke Blue Devils men's basketball team
Players
Coaches

| Pos. | # | Name | Height | Weight | Year | Hometown |
|---|---|---|---|---|---|---|
| F | 20 | Gene Banks | 6 ft 7 in (2.01 m) | 205 lb (93 kg) | Sr | Philadelphia, PA |
| F | 33 | Kenny Dennard | 6 ft 7 in (2.01 m) | 200 lb (91 kg) | Sr | Walnut Cove, NC |
| G | 22 | Tom Emma | 6 ft 2 in (1.88 m) | 175 lb (79 kg) | So | Manhasset, NY |
| G | 14 | Chip Engelland | 6 ft 4 in (1.93 m) | 180 lb (82 kg) | So | Pacific Palisades, CA |
| F | 24 | Larry Linney | 6 ft 4 in (1.93 m) | 190 lb (86 kg) | Sr | Asheville, NC |
| G | 11 | Doug McNeely | 6 ft 5 in (1.96 m) | 200 lb (91 kg) | Fr | El Paso, TX |
| G/F | 30 | Jim Suddath | 6 ft 6 in (1.98 m) | 190 lb (86 kg) | Sr | East Point, GA |
| G | 12 | Vince Taylor | 6 ft 5 in (1.96 m) | 180 lb (82 kg) | Jr | Lexington, KY |
| F | 31 | Mike Tissaw | 6 ft 8 in (2.03 m) | 210 lb (95 kg) | So | Fairfax, VA |
| G | 21 | Gordon Whitted | 6 ft 2 in (1.88 m) | 195 lb (88 kg) | Fr | Winston-Salem, NC |
| F | 41 | Allen Williams | 6 ft 8 in (2.03 m) | 220 lb (100 kg) | So | Princeton, WV |

Head coach

Mike Krzyzewski

Assistant coach(es)

Chuck Swenson

Legend

- (C) Team captain
- (S) Suspended
- (I) Ineligible
- (W) Walk-on
- Injured
- Current redshirt

Roster
Last update: 2015-Apr-11

== Schedule ==
| Date time, TV | Rank^{#} | Opponent^{#} | Result | Record | Site city, state |
|---|---|---|---|---|---|
| November 30* | | Stetson | W 67–49 | 1–0 | Cameron Indoor Stadium (8,100); Durham, North Carolina |
| December 2* | | at South Florida | W 83–72 | 2–0 | Sun Dome (6,023); Tampa, Florida |
| December 5* | | vs. No. 10 North Carolina; Big Four Tournament | L 76–78 | 2–1 | Greensboro Coliseum (15,333); Greensboro, North Carolina |
| December 6* | | vs. N.C. State; Big Four Tournament | L 60–74 | 2–2 | Greensboro Coliseum (15,333); Greensboro, North Carolina |
| December 9* | | at Vanderbilt | W 72–69 ^{OT} | 3–2 | Memorial Gymnasium (15,636); Nashville, Tennessee |
| December 12 | | No. 6 Virginia | L 79–91 | 3–3 (0–1) | Cameron Indoor Stadium (8,564); Durham, North Carolina |
| December 19* | | Brown; Iron Duke Classic | W 91–60 | 4–3 | Cameron Indoor Stadium (6,425); Durham, North Carolina |
| December 20* | | Detroit; Iron Duke Classic | W 111–71 | 5–3 | Cameron Indoor Stadium (6,450); Durham, North Carolina |
| December 22* | | Pennsylvania | W 88–82 | 6–3 | Cameron Indoor Stadium (7,450); Durham, North Carolina |
| December 28 | | vs. New Orleans; Sugar Bowl Tournament | W 77–63 | 7–3 | Louisiana Superdome (3,000); New Orleans, Louisiana |
| December 29* | | vs. Tennessee; Sugar Bowl Tournament | L 69–90 | 7–4 | Louisiana Superdome (4,610); New Orleans, Louisiana |
| January 10 | | at No. 8 Maryland; Rivalry | L 79–94 | 7–5 (0–2) | Cole Field House (13,197); College Park, Maryland |
| January 14 | | No. 5 Wake Forest | L 73–76 | 7–6 (0–3) | Cameron Indoor Stadium (8,564); Durham, North Carolina |
| January 17 | | at No. 17 North Carolina; Rivalry | L 65–80 | 7–7 (0–4) | Carmichael Auditorium (10,000); Chapel Hill, North Carolina |
| January 19* | | George Mason | W 60–51 | 8–7 | Cameron Indoor Stadium (6,500); Durham, North Carolina |
| January 21 | | at N.C. State | W 56–47 | 9–7 (1–4) | Reynolds Coliseum (12,100); Raleigh, North Carolina |
| January 24 | | No. 19 Clemson | W 75–57 | 10–7 (2–4) | Cameron Indoor Stadium (8,564); Durham, North Carolina |
| January 27* | | at Rutgers | W 53–51 | 11–7 | Louis Brown Athletic Center (6,575); Piscataway, New Jersey |
| January 31 | | at No. 1 Virginia | L 47–68 | 11–8 (2–5) | University Hall (9,000); Charlottesville, Virginia |
| February 4 | | at Georgia Tech | W 82–68 | 12–8 (3–5) | Alexander Memorial Coliseum (2,532); Atlanta, Georgia |
| February 7 | | No. 13 Maryland | W 55–54 | 13–8 (4–5) | Cameron Indoor Stadium (8,564); Durham, North Carolina |
| February 14 | | at No. 7 Wake Forest | L 52–58 | 13–9 (4–6) | Winston-Salem Memorial Coliseum (8,200); Winston-Salem, North Carolina |
| February 21 | | N.C. State | L 51–52 | 13–10 (4–7) | Cameron Indoor Stadium; Durham, North Carolina |
| February 21 | | Georgia Tech | W 83–56 | 14–10 (5–7) | Cameron Indoor Stadium (8,564); Durham, North Carolina |
| February 25 | | at Clemson | L 52–54 ^{OT} | 14–11 (5–8) | Littlejohn Coliseum (10,500); Clemson, South Carolina |
| February 28 | | No. 11 North Carolina | W 66–65 ^{OT} | 15–11 (6–8) | Cameron Indoor Stadium (8,564); Durham, North Carolina |
| March 5* | | vs. Maryland; ACC tournament • Quarterfinals | L 53–56 | 15–12 | Capital Centre (8,564); Landover, Maryland |
| March 12* | | North Carolina A&T; National Invitation Tournament • First Round | W 79–69 | 16–12 | Cameron Indoor Stadium (8,035); Durham, North Carolina |
| March 16* | | Alabama; National Invitation Tournament • Second Round | W 75–70 | 17–12 | Cameron Indoor Stadium; Durham, North Carolina |
| March 20* | | at Purdue; National Invitation Tournament • Quarterfinals | L 69–81 | 17–13 | Mackey Arena (12,754); West Lafayette, Indiana |
*Non-conference game. ^{#}Rankings from AP Poll. (#) Tournament seedings in parentheses.

== Team players drafted into the NBA ==
| Round | Pick | Player | NBA club |
| 2 | 28 | Gene Banks | San Antonio Spurs |
