= 1981 Missouri Valley Conference men's basketball tournament =

- Classification: Division I
- Season: 1980–81
- Teams: 8
- Site: Campus sites
- Finals site: Levitt Arena; Wichita, Kansas
- Champions: Creighton (2nd title)
- Winning coach: Tom Apke (2nd title)

1980–81 Missouri Valley Conference men's basketball standings
	Conf.				Overall
Team	W		L	PCT	W		L	PCT
Wichita State	12	–	4	.750	26	–	7	.788
Creighton †	11	–	5	.688	21	–	9	.700
Tulsa	11	–	5	.688	26	–	7	.788
Drake	10	–	6	.625	18	–	11	.621
Bradley	10	–	6	.625	18	–	9	.667
New Mexico State	7	–	9	.438	10	–	17	.370
West Texas State	7	–	9	.438	16	–	11	.593
Indiana State	4	–	12	.250	9	–	18	.333
Southern Illinois	0	–	16	.000	7	–	20	.259
† 1981 MVC tournament winner Rankings from AP poll

The 1981 Missouri Valley Conference men's basketball tournament was played after the conclusion of the 1980–1981 regular season. The quarterfinal and semifinal rounds were played at campus sites, with the final contested at Levitt Arena on the campus of Wichita State University in Wichita, Kansas.

The Creighton defeated the Wichita State Shockers in the championship game, 70–64, and as a result won their 2nd MVC Tournament title and earned an automatic bid to the 1981 NCAA tournament.

== Bracket ==
Quarterfinals; March 5, 1981; Campus Sites
1	Wichita State *	77
8	Southern Illinois	57
4	Drake *	89
5	Bradley	84
2	Creighton *	64
7	Indiana State	61
3	Tulsa *	68
6	New Mexico State	67

Semifinals; March 6, 1981; Campus Sites
1	Wichita State *	88
4	Drake	74
2	Creighton *	66
3	Tulsa	64

Final; March 7, 1981; Levitt Arena
1	Wichita State *	64
2	Creighton	70

Note: * indicates host institution
