= 1975–76 North Carolina Tar Heels men's basketball team =

American college basketball season

1975–76 North Carolina Tar Heels men's basketball

ACC regular season champion

NCAA tournament, First Round
- Conference: Atlantic Coast Conference

Ranking
- Coaches: No. 6
- AP: No. 8
- Record: 25–4 (11–1 ACC)
- Head coach: Dean Smith (15th season)
- Assistant coaches: Bill Guthridge (9th season); Eddie Fogler (5th season)
- Home arena: Carmichael Auditorium

1975–76 ACC men's basketball standings
	Conf.				Overall
Team	W		L	PCT	W		L	PCT
No. 8 North Carolina	11	–	1	.917	25	–	4	.862
No. 11 Maryland	7	–	5	.583	22	–	6	.786
NC State	7	–	5	.583	21	–	9	.700
Clemson	5	–	7	.417	18	–	10	.643
Wake Forest	5	–	7	.417	17	–	10	.630
No. 18 Virginia †	4	–	8	.333	18	–	12	.600
Duke	3	–	9	.250	13	–	14	.481
† 1976 ACC tournament winner Rankings from AP Poll

The 1975–76 North Carolina Tar Heels men's basketball team was an American basketball team. They represented the University of North Carolina at Chapel Hill.

== Schedule ==
Date time, TV	Rank^{#}	Opponent^{#}	Result	Record	Site city, state
November 29*	No. 5	Howard	W 115–75		Carmichael Auditorium; Chapel Hill, NC
December 4*	No. 4	vs. Seton Hall	W 75–63		Madison Square Garden; New York, NY
December 6*	No. 4	Virginia Tech	W 88–75		Carmichael Auditorium; Chapel Hill, NC
December 8*	No. 4	vs. No. 7 Kentucky	W 90–77		Charlotte, NC
December 20*	No. 4	at East Tennessee State	W 104–67		
December 22*	No. 4	at South Florida	W 70–64		
January 2*	No. 3	vs. Wake Forest; Big Four Tournament	L 88–95		Greensboro, NC
January 3*	No. 3	vs. Duke; Big Four Tournament	W 77–74		Greensboro, NC
January 5*	No. 3	Yale	W 81–42		Carmichael Auditorium; Chapel Hill, NC
January 7	No. 6	at Clemson	W 83–64		Clemson, SC
January 10	No. 6	at Virginia	W 85–82		Charlottesville, VA
January 14	No. 7	No. 5 Wake Forest	W 99–75		Carmichael Auditorium; Chapel Hill, NC
January 17	No. 7	at Duke	W 89–87		Cameron Indoor Stadium; Chapel Hill, NC
January 18	No. 7	No. 13 NC State	L 67–68		Carmichael Auditorium; Chapel Hill, NC
January 25	No. 5	No. 2 Maryland	W 95–93 ^{OT}		Carmichael Auditorium; Chapel Hill, NC
January 28	No. 4	at Wake Forest	W 88–85 ^{OT}		Winston-Salem, NC
January 31	No. 4	Clemson	W 79–64		Carmichael Auditorium; Chapel Hill, NC
February 4*	No. 4	at Detroit Mercy	W 91–76		
February 6*	No. 4	vs. Georgia Tech; North-South Doubleheader	W 79–74		Charlotte, NC
February 7*	No. 7	vs. Furman; North-South Doubleheader	W 97–64		Charlotte, NC
February 11	No. 3	at No. 4 Maryland	W 81–69		College Park, MD
February 14*	No. 3	at Tulane	W 113–106 ^{4OT}		New Orleans, LA
February 18*	No. 3	at Miami (OH)	W 77–75		
February 21	No. 3	Virginia	W 73–71		Carmichael Auditorium; Chapel Hill, NC
February 24	No. 3	at No. 15 NC State	W 91–79		Raleigh, NC
February 28	No. 4	Duke	W 91–71		Carmichael Auditorium; Chapel Hill, NC
March 5*	No. 4	vs. Clemson; ACC tournament	W 82–74		Capital Centre; Landover, MD
March 6*	No. 4	vs. Virginia; ACC Tournament	L 62–67		Capital Centre; Landover, MD
March 13*	No. 5	vs. No. 8 Alabama; NCAA tournament	L 64–79		University of Dayton Arena; Dayton, OH
*Non-conference game. ^{#}Rankings from AP Poll. (#) Tournament seedings in parentheses. ME=Mideast.
