= 1981 NCAA Division I basketball tournament =

Edition of USA college basketball tournament

- Season: 1980–81
- Teams: 48
- Finals site: The Spectrum, Philadelphia, Pennsylvania
- Champions: Indiana Hoosiers (4th title, 4th title game, 5th Final Four)
- Runner-up: North Carolina Tar Heels (5th title game, 8th Final Four)
- Semifinalists: Virginia Cavaliers (1st Final Four); LSU Tigers (2nd Final Four)
- Winning coach: Bob Knight (2nd title)
- MOP: Isiah Thomas (Indiana)
- Attendance: 347,414
- Top scorer: Al Wood (North Carolina) (109 points)

The 1981 NCAA Division I basketball tournament involved 48 schools playing in single-elimination play to determine the national champion of men's NCAA Division I college basketball. The 43rd annual edition of the tournament began on March 12, 1981, and ended with the championship game on March 30, at The Spectrum in Philadelphia. A total of 48 games were played, including a national third-place game (the last in the NCAA tournament). It was also the last tournament to be televised on NBC, before CBS took over the following year. Additionally, it was the last season in which the NCAA sponsored championships only in men's sports; the first Division I women's tournament would be played the following year.

Indiana, coached by Bob Knight, won the national title with a 63–50 victory over North Carolina, coached by Dean Smith. Isiah Thomas of Indiana was named the Tournament's Most Outstanding Player.

== The March 14 upsets ==
The date of Saturday, March 14, 1981, resulted in three major second round tournament upsets which were decided by last-second baskets.

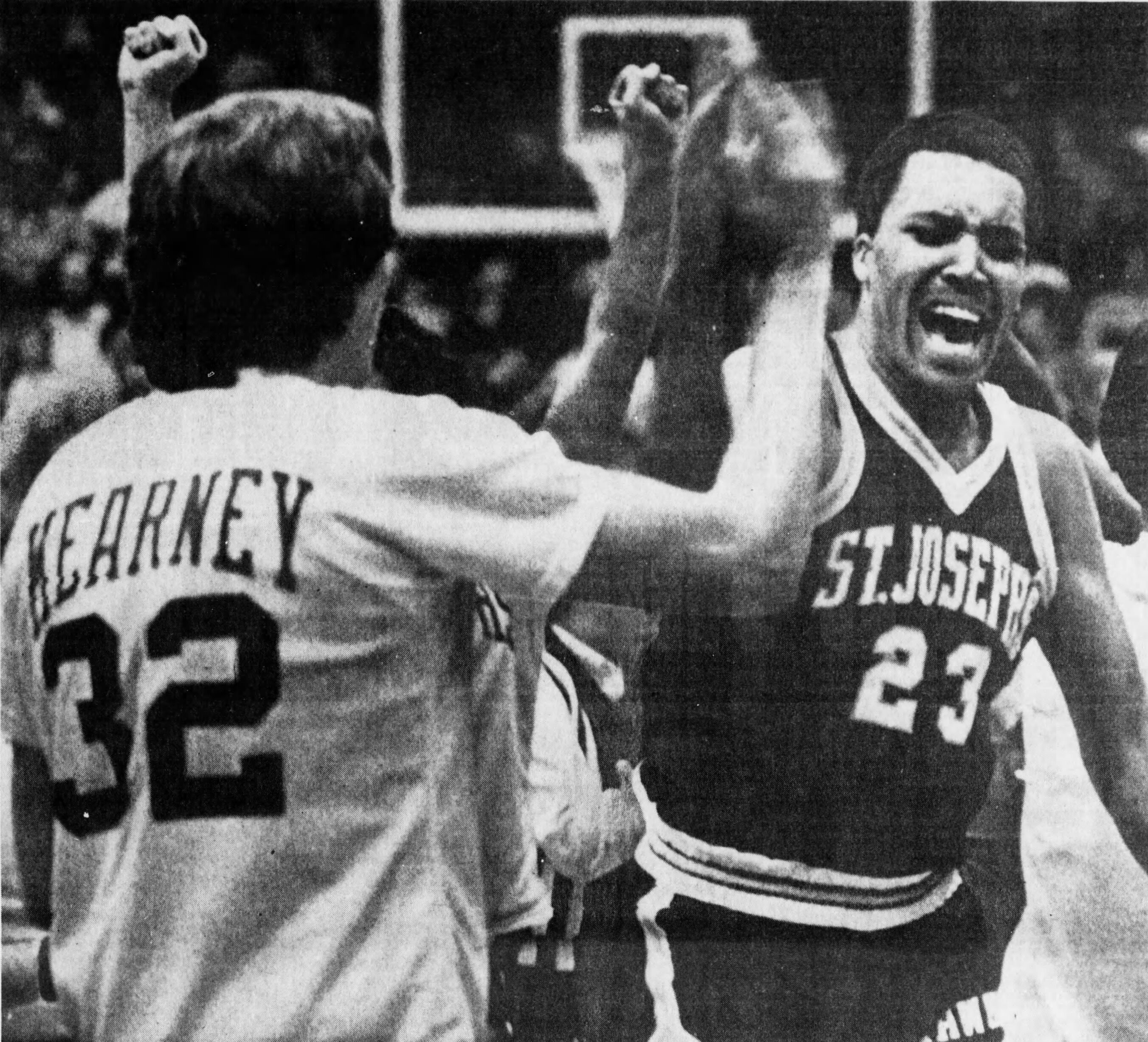
Bob Kearney and Tony Costner of Saint Joseph's celebrate after their upset win over DePaul

St. Joseph's trailed No. 1 seed DePaul by seven at about the midway point of the second half, in an early afternoon Mideast Region game from Dayton, Ohio. However, with under a minute left, the Hawks had rallied to within one point, 48–47. Blue Demons guard Skip Dillard was fouled with 12 seconds left. Dillard was known as 'Money' for his superb free throw shooting (85%), but he missed the front end of a one-and-one opportunity, and St. Joseph's guard Bryan Warrick got the rebound and dribbled to the front court without calling a timeout. Then he got the ball to freshman Lonnie McFarlan who was wide open in the right corner. McFarlan began to shoot until forward John Smith yelled "Please!" to him. McFarlan passed to Smith, who was open underneath the basket. Smith's layup with two seconds left enabled the Hawks of coach Jim Lynam to stun the Blue Demons of Ray Meyer, 49–48.

Later in the afternoon in Austin, Texas, Arkansas coach Eddie Sutton called timeout with 5 seconds left after falling behind Louisville in the Midwest Region, 73–72 on a jumper by guard Derek Smith. Sutton told his team to get the ball to U.S. Reed. The Razorbacks' guard dribbled to near half court, then launched a 49-foot shot that beat the buzzer and swished through the net, as Arkansas dethroned the defending national champion Cardinals of Denny Crum, 74–73. Sutton told the media, "Champions die hard."

Only moments after the Razorbacks' upset, the season ended for another #1 seed in the West Region in Los Angeles. Oregon State led Kansas State by as much as 11 points in the second half. Coach Ralph Miller and center Steve Johnson had led the Beavers to a two-year record of 52–4. Then Rolando Blackman led the Wildcats back with a 16–6 run to tie the game, 48–48 with 3:23 left. Johnson then fouled out, and both teams stalled with the ball until Oregon State missed the front end of a one-and-one from the foul line. K-State then held for the last shot. With two seconds left, Blackman, double-teamed, drilled a fall-away 17 footer from the right baseline for a 50–48 upset by the Wildcats of Jack Hartman.

In another second round Mideast Region upset, UAB defeated Kentucky 69–62. A semifinal in the East Region saw Danny Ainge dribble the length of the court and drive all the way in for a layup and another buzzer-beating winner, lifting BYU over Notre Dame 51–50.

Greg Johnson of NCAA.com, in a March 9, 2011 article, indicated that March 14, 1981 was a date which defined March Madness.

== Schedule and venues ==
1981 sites for first and second round games
1981 Regionals (blue) and Final Four (red)

The following are the sites that were selected to host each round of the 1981 tournament:

First and Second rounds

- March 12 and 14
  - East Region
    - Providence Civic Center, Providence, Rhode Island (Host: Providence College)
  - Mideast Region
    - University of Dayton Arena, Dayton, Ohio (Host: University of Dayton)
  - Midwest Region
    - Frank Erwin Center, Austin, Texas (Host: University of Texas at Austin)
  - West Region
    - Pauley Pavilion, Los Angeles, California (Host: UCLA)
- March 13 and 15
  - East Region
    - Charlotte Coliseum, Charlotte, North Carolina (Host: University of North Carolina at Charlotte)
  - Mideast Region
    - Memorial Coliseum, Tuscaloosa, Alabama (Host: University of Alabama at Tuscaloosa)
  - Midwest Region
    - Levitt Arena, Wichita, Kansas (Host: Wichita State University)
  - West Region
    - Special Events Center, El Paso, Texas (Host: University of Texas at El Paso)

Regional semifinals and finals (Sweet Sixteen and Elite Eight)

- March 19 and 21
  - East Regional, Omni Coliseum, Atlanta, Georgia (Host: Georgia Tech)
  - West Regional, Special Events Center, Salt Lake City, Utah (Host: University of Utah)
- March 20 and 22
  - Mideast Regional, Assembly Hall, Bloomington, Indiana (Host: Indiana University Bloomington)
  - Midwest Regional, Louisiana Superdome, New Orleans, Louisiana (Host: Tulane University)

National semifinals and championship (Final Four and championship)

- March 28 and 30
  - The Spectrum, Philadelphia, Pennsylvania (Hosts: The Philadelphia Big 5 - Villanova University, Temple University, La Salle University, Saint Joseph's University, University of Pennsylvania)

== Teams ==
Region	Seed	Team	Coach	Conference	Finished	Final Opponent	Score
East
East	1	Virginia	Terry Holland	ACC	Third Place	1 LSU	W 78–74
East	2	Notre Dame	Digger Phelps	Independent	Sweet Sixteen	6 BYU	L 51–50
East	3	UCLA	Larry Brown	Pacific-10	Round of 32	6 BYU	L 78–55
East	4	Tennessee	Don DeVoe	SEC	Sweet Sixteen	1 Virginia	L 62–48
East	5	VCU	J. D. Barnett	Sun Belt	Round of 32	4 Tennessee	L 58–56
East	6	BYU	Frank Arnold	WAC	Regional Runner-up	1 Virginia	L 74–60
East	7	Georgetown	John Thompson	Big East	Round of 48	10 James Madison	L 61–55
East	8	Houston	Guy Lewis	Southwest	Round of 48	9 Villanova	L 90–72
East	9	Villanova	Rollie Massimino	Big East	Round of 32	1 Virginia	L 54–50
East	10	James Madison	Lou Campanelli	ECAC South	Round of 32	2 Notre Dame	L 54–45
East	11	Princeton	Pete Carril	Ivy League	Round of 48	6 BYU	L 60–51
East	12	Long Island	Paul Lizzo	ECAC Metro	Round of 48	5 VCU	L 85–69
Mideast
Mideast	1	DePaul	Ray Meyer	Independent	Round of 32	9 Saint Joseph's	L 49–48
Mideast	2	Kentucky	Joe B. Hall	SEC	Round of 32	7 UAB	L 69–62
Mideast	3	Indiana	Bob Knight	Big Ten	Champion	2 North Carolina	W 63–50
Mideast	4	Wake Forest	Carl Tacy	ACC	Round of 32	5 Boston College	L 67–64
Mideast	5	Boston College	Tom Davis	Big East	Sweet Sixteen	9 Saint Joseph's	L 42–41
Mideast	6	Maryland	Lefty Driesell	ACC	Round of 32	3 Indiana	L 99–64
Mideast	7	UAB	Gene Bartow	Sun Belt	Sweet Sixteen	3 Indiana	L 87–72
Mideast	8	Creighton	Tom Apke	Missouri Valley	Round of 48	9 Saint Joseph's	L 59–57
Mideast	9	Saint Joseph's	Jim Lynam	East Coast	Regional Runner-up	3 Indiana	L 78–46
Mideast	10	Western Kentucky	Clem Haskins	Ohio Valley	Round of 48	7 UAB	L 93–68
Mideast	11	Chattanooga	Murray Arnold	Southern	Round of 48	6 Maryland	L 81–69
Mideast	12	Ball State	Steve Yoder	MAC	Round of 48	5 Boston College	L 93–90
Midwest
Midwest	1	LSU	Dale Brown	SEC	Fourth Place	1 Virginia	L 78–74
Midwest	2	Arizona State	Ned Wulk	Pacific-10	Round of 32	7 Kansas	L 88–71
Midwest	3	Iowa	Lute Olson	Big Ten	Round of 32	6 Wichita State	L 60–56
Midwest	4	Louisville	Denny Crum	Metro	Round of 32	5 Arkansas	L 74–73
Midwest	5	Arkansas	Eddie Sutton	Southwest	Sweet Sixteen	1 LSU	L 72–56
Midwest	6	Wichita State	Gene Smithson	Missouri Valley	Regional Runner-up	1 LSU	L 96–85
Midwest	7	Kansas	Ted Owens	Big Eight	Sweet Sixteen	6 Wichita State	L 66–65
Midwest	8	Lamar	Pat Foster	Southland	Round of 32	1 LSU	L 100–78
Midwest	9	Missouri	Norm Stewart	Big Eight	Round of 48	8 Lamar	L 71–67
Midwest	10	Ole Miss	Bob Weltlich	SEC	Round of 48	7 Kansas	L 69–66
Midwest	11	Southern	Carl Stewart	SWAC	Round of 48	6 Wichita State	L 95–70
Midwest	12	Mercer	Bill Bibb	Trans America	Round of 48	5 Arkansas	L 73–67
West
West	1	Oregon State	Ralph Miller	Pacific-10	Round of 32	8 Kansas State	L 50–48
West	2	North Carolina	Dean Smith	ACC	Runner Up	3 Indiana	L 63–50
West	3	Utah	Jerry Pimm	WAC	Sweet Sixteen	2 North Carolina	L 61–56
West	4	Illinois	Lou Henson	Big Ten	Sweet Sixteen	8 Kansas State	L 57–52
West	5	Wyoming	Jim Brandenburg	WAC	Round of 32	4 Illinois	L 67–65
West	6	Fresno State	Boyd Grant	Pacific Coast	Round of 48	11 Northeastern	L 55–53
West	7	Idaho	Don Monson	Big Sky	Round of 48	10 Pittsburgh	L 70–69
West	8	Kansas State	Jack Hartman	Big Eight	Regional Runner-up	2 North Carolina	L 82–68
West	9	San Francisco	Peter Barry	West Coast	Round of 48	8 Kansas State	L 64–60
West	10	Pittsburgh	Roy Chipman	Eastern	Round of 32	2 North Carolina	L 74–57
West	11	Northeastern	Jim Calhoun	ECAC North	Round of 32	3 Utah	L 94–69
West	12	Howard	A.B. Williamson	MEAC	Round of 48	5 Wyoming	L 78–43

== Bracket ==
* – Denotes overtime period

=== East region ===
First round
8	Houston	72
9	Villanova	90
5	VCU	85
12	Long Island	69
6	BYU	60
11	Princeton	51
7	Georgetown	55
10	James Madison	61

Quarter-finals
9	Villanova	50
1	Virginia	54
4	Tennessee	58
5	VCU	56*
6	BYU	78
3	UCLA	55
2	Notre Dame	54
10	James Madison	45

Regional semifinals
1	Virginia	62
4	Tennessee	48
6	BYU	51
2	Notre Dame	50

Regional Finals
1	Virginia	74
6	BYU	60

=== West region ===
First round
8	Kansas State	64
9	San Francisco	60
5	Wyoming	78
12	Howard	43
6	Fresno State	53
11	Northeastern	55
7	Idaho	69*
10	Pittsburgh	70

Quarter-finals
8	Kansas State	50
1	Oregon State	48
4	Illinois	67
5	Wyoming	65
11	Northeastern	69
3	Utah	94
2	North Carolina	74
10	Pittsburgh	57

Regional semifinals
8	Kansas State	57
4	Illinois	52
3	Utah	56
2	North Carolina	61

Regional Finals
8	Kansas State	68
2	North Carolina	82

=== Mideast region ===
First round
8	Creighton	57
9	Saint Joseph's	59
5	Boston College	93
12	Ball State	90
6	Maryland	81
11	Chattanooga	69
7	UAB	93
10	Western Kentucky	68

Quarter-finals
9	Saint Joseph's	49
1	DePaul	48
4	Wake Forest	64
5	Boston College	67
6	Maryland	64
3	Indiana	99
2	Kentucky	62
7	UAB	69

Regional semifinals
9	Saint Joseph's	42
5	Boston College	41
3	Indiana	87
7	UAB	72

Regional Finals
9	Saint Joseph's	46
3	Indiana	78

=== Midwest region ===
First round
8	Lamar	71
9	Missouri	67
5	Arkansas	73
12	Mercer	67
6	Wichita State	95
11	Southern	70
7	Kansas	69
10	Ole Miss	66

Quarter-finals
8	Lamar	78
1	LSU	100
4	Louisville	73
5	Arkansas	74
6	Wichita State	60
3	Iowa	56
2	Arizona State	71
7	Kansas	88

Regional semifinals
1	LSU	72
5	Arkansas	56
6	Wichita State	66
7	Kansas	65

Regional Finals
1	LSU	96
6	Wichita State	85

=== Final Four ===
National semifinals Saturday, March 28
E1	Virginia	65
W2	North Carolina	78
ME3	Indiana	67
MW1	LSU	49

National Final; Monday, March 30
W2	North Carolina	50
ME3	Indiana	63
National third-place game
E1	Virginia	78
MW1	LSU	74

== Notes ==
- This was the last tournament that a third-place game was staged prior to the national championship; every prior championship since 1946 had featured the game.
- The 1981 tournament holds the record for the most first-time participants. Twelve teams – UAB, Ball State, Chattanooga, Fresno State, Howard, Idaho, James Madison, LIU, Mercer, Mississippi, Northeastern, and Southern – appeared in their first tournament. UAB, coached by Gene Bartow, made it the furthest, reaching the Sweet Sixteen before falling to eventual champion Indiana. The twelve teams beat the previous record of eleven set in 1955. Half of the first time teams would return in 1982, with the longest drought before their second appearance being sixteen years for the Ole Miss Rebels.
- As of 2026, this is the only time all three Division I schools from Kansas—Kansas, Kansas State and Wichita State—have advanced to the Sweet 16.
- As of 2023, all forty-eight teams in the 1981 tournament have returned to the tournament at least once. This would happen five more times in the 1980s, but has not happened again since 1989.

== Announcers (NBC and NCAA Productions) ==
- Dick Enberg, Billy Packer and Al McGuire – Second round at Providence, Rhode Island (UCLA–Brigham Young, Notre Dame–James Madison); Second round at Charlotte, North Carolina (Virginia–Villanova, Tennessee–VCU); East Regional Final at Atlanta, Georgia; Midwest Regional Final at New Orleans, Louisiana; Final Four at Philadelphia, Pennsylvania
- Marv Albert and Steve Grote – Mideast Regional Final at Bloomington, Indiana
- Don Criqui and Gary Thompson – Second round at Dayton, Ohio (DePaul–St. Joseph's, Indiana–Maryland); West Regional Final at Salt Lake City, Utah (Kansas State-North Carolina)
- Bill O'Donnell and Jeff Mullins – East Regional semifinals at Atlanta, Georgia
- Jim Thacker and Steve Grote – Mideast Regional semifinals at Bloomington, Indiana
- Fred White and Larry Conley – Midwest Regional semifinals at New Orleans, Louisiana
- Bob Costas and Gary Thompson – Second round at Tuscaloosa, Alabama (Kentucky–UAB, Wake Forest–Boston College)
- Marv Albert and Bucky Waters – Second round at Austin, Texas (LSU–Lamar, Louisville–Arkansas)
- Charlie Jones and Lynn Shackelford – Second round at Wichita, Kansas (Iowa–Wichita State, Arizona State–Kansas)
- Jay Randolph and Steve Grote – Second round at Los Angeles, California (Oregon State–Kansas State, Illinois–Wyoming)
- Merle Harmon and Matt Guokas – Second round at El Paso, Texas (Utah–Northeastern, North Carolina–Pittsburgh)
- Tom Hammond and Larry Conley – First round at Tuscaloosa, Alabama (Boston College–Ball State, UAB–Western Kentucky)
- Tom Hammond and Gary Thompson-West Regional Semifinals at Salt Lake City, Utah

== See also ==
- 1981 NCAA Division II basketball tournament
- 1981 NCAA Division III basketball tournament
- 1981 National Invitation Tournament
- 1981 NAIA Division I men's basketball tournament
- 1981 NAIA Division I women's basketball tournament
- 1981 National Women's Invitation Tournament
