= 1980–81 Virginia Cavaliers men's basketball team =

American college basketball season

1980–81 Virginia Cavaliers men's basketball

ACC regular season champions

NCAA tournament, Final Four
- Conference: Atlantic Coast Conference

Ranking
- Coaches: No. 3
- AP: No. 5
- Record: 29–5 (13–1 ACC)
- Head coach: Terry Holland (7th season)
- Assistant coaches: Jim Larranaga (2nd season); Craig Littlepage (5th season)
- Home arena: University Hall

1980–81 ACC men's basketball standings
	Conf.				Overall
Team	W		L	PCT	W		L	PCT
No. 5 Virginia	13	–	1	.929	29	–	4	.879
No. 6 North Carolina †	10	–	4	.714	29	–	8	.784
No. 11 Wake Forest	9	–	5	.643	22	–	7	.759
No. 18 Maryland	8	–	6	.571	21	–	10	.677
Duke	6	–	8	.429	17	–	13	.567
Clemson	6	–	8	.429	20	–	11	.645
NC State	4	–	10	.286	14	–	13	.519
Georgia Tech	0	–	14	.000	4	–	23	.148
† 1981 ACC tournament winner Rankings from AP Poll

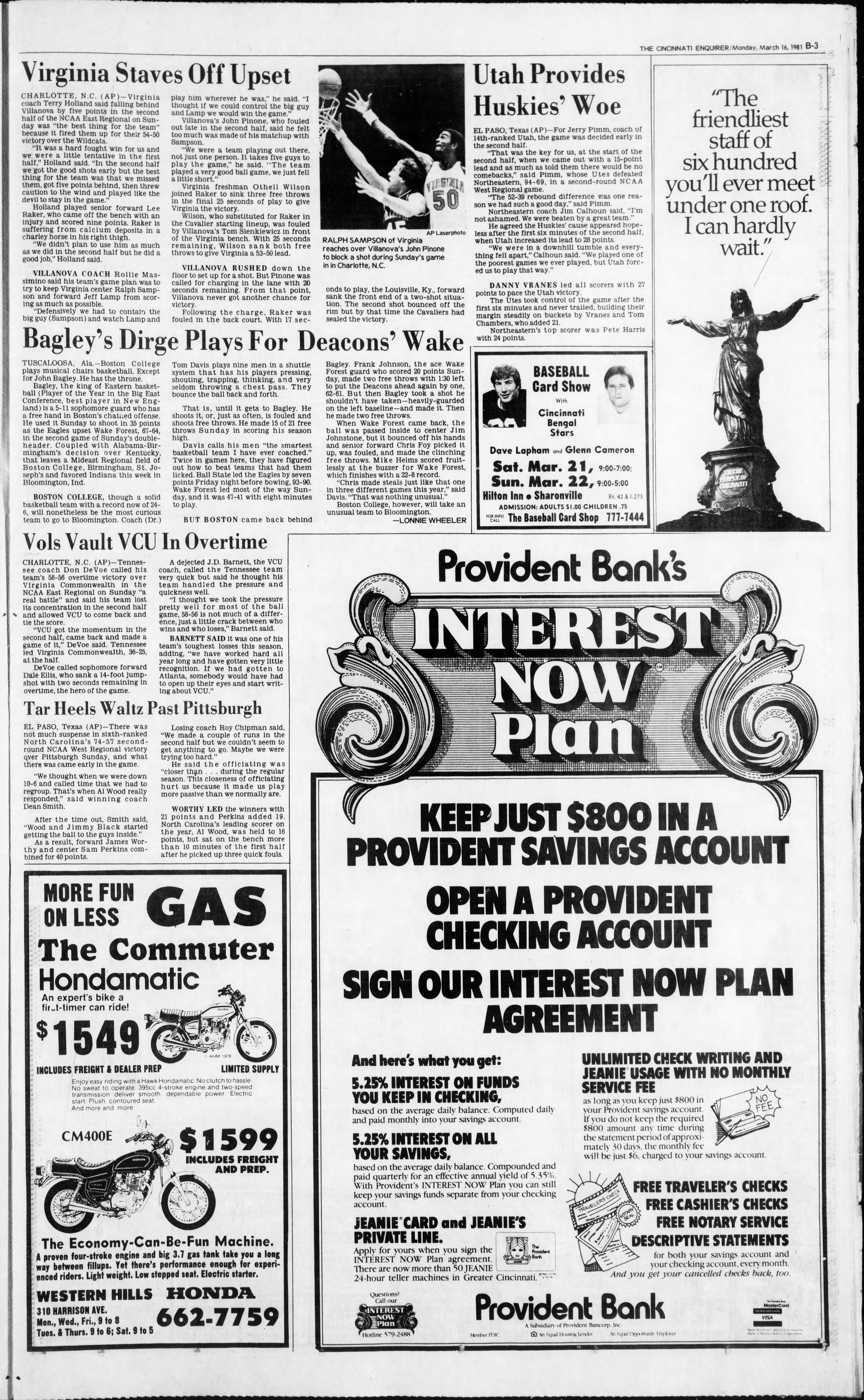
Scanned from the March 16, 1981 issue of The Cincinnati Enquirer

The 1980–81 Virginia Cavaliers men's basketball team represented University of Virginia and was a member of the Atlantic Coast Conference.

== Roster ==
1980–81 Virginia Cavaliers men's basketball team
Players
Coaches

Pos.	#	Name	Height	Weight	Year	Hometown
F/C	12	Dean Carpenter	6 ft 9 in (2.06 m)	206 lb (93 kg)	Jr	Metairie, Louisiana
G	5	Louis Collins	6 ft 5 in (1.96 m)	205 lb (93 kg)	Sr	Richmond, Virginia
G	21	Darren Cross	6 ft 4 in (1.93 m)	181 lb (82 kg)	So	Queens, New York
F	44	Terry Gates	6 ft 8 in (2.03 m)	219 lb (99 kg)	Sr	Ridgewood, New Jersey
G	24	Jeff Jones	6 ft 4 in (1.93 m)	190 lb (86 kg)	Jr	Owensboro, Kentucky
G	23	Jeff Klein	6 ft 5 in (1.96 m)	185 lb (84 kg)	Sr	Akron, Ohio
G	3	Jeff Lamp (C)	6 ft 6 in (1.98 m)	200 lb (91 kg)	Sr	Prior Lake, Minnesota
F/C	55	Lewis Lattimore	6 ft 9 in (2.06 m)	217 lb (98 kg)	Sr	Dayton, Ohio
F	42	Peter MacBeth (redshirt)	6 ft 8 in (2.03 m)	230 lb (104 kg)	So	Marietta, Georgia
G	32	Doug Newburg	6 ft 2 in (1.88 m)	185 lb (84 kg)	So	McLean, Virginia
F	25	Lee Raker (C)	6 ft 5 in (1.96 m)	201 lb (91 kg)	Sr	Louisville, Kentucky
F	10	Craig Robinson	6 ft 8 in (2.03 m)	195 lb (88 kg)	So	Montclair, New Jersey
C	50	Ralph Sampson	7 ft 4 in (2.24 m)	221 lb (100 kg)	So	Harrisonburg, Virginia
G	14	Ricky Stokes	5 ft 10 in (1.78 m)	155 lb (70 kg)	Fr	Richmond, Virginia
G	11	Othell Wilson	6 ft 0 in (1.83 m)	190 lb (86 kg)	Fr	Woodbridge, Virginia

Head coach

- Terry Holland (Davidson)

Assistant coach(es)

- Craig Littlepage (Penn)
- Jim Larrañaga (Providence)

Legend

- (C) Team captain
- (S) Suspended
- (I) Ineligible
- (W) Walk-on
- Injured
- Current redshirt

== Schedule ==
Date time, TV	Rank^{#}	Opponent^{#}	Result	Record	Site (attendance) city, state
Regular season
Nov. 28*	No. 8	Bucknell	W 64–45	1–0	University Hall (9,000); Charlottesville, Virginia
Nov. 29*	No. 8	VCU	W 77–62	2–0	University Hall (9,000); Charlottesville, Virginia
Dec. 3*	No. 7	Randolph–Macon	W 83–52	3–0	University Hall (9,000); Charlottesville, Virginia
Dec. 6*	No. 7	at William & Mary	W 88–68	4–0	William & Mary Hall (9,000); Williamsburg, Virginia
Dec. 12	No. 6	at Duke	W 91–79	5–0 (1–0)	Cameron Indoor Stadium (9,000); Durham, North Carolina
Dec. 22*	No. 5	Baltimore	W 103–62	6–0	University Hall (9,000); Charlottesville, Virginia
Dec. 30*	No. 3	at James Madison	W 53–52	7–0	Godwin Hall (10,000); Harrisonburg, Virginia
Jan. 3*	No. 3	vs. Virginia Tech	W 64–51	8–0	Roanoke Civic Center (8,564); Roanoke, Virginia
Jan. 5*	No. 3	at Delaware	W 88–69	9–0	Delaware Field House (9,000); Newark, Delaware
Jan. 7	No. 3	NC State	W 63–55	10–0 (2–0)	University Hall (5,100); Charlottesville, Virginia
Jan. 10	No. 3	No. 16 North Carolina	W 63–57	11–0 (3–0)	University Hall (10,056); Charlottesville, Virginia
Jan. 14	No. 2	at No. 10 Maryland	W 66–64	12–0 (4–0)	Cole Field House (14,500); College Park, Maryland
Jan. 17	No. 2	at Georgia Tech	W 85–48	13–0 (5–0)	Alexander Memorial Coliseum (6,591); Atlanta
Jan. 19	No. 2	at No. 19 Clemson	W 74–59	14–0 (6–0)	Littlejohn Coliseum (12,500); Clemson, South Carolina
Jan. 21*	No. 2	George Washington	W 86–56	15–0	University Hall (9,000); Charlottesville, Virginia
Jan. 25*	No. 2	Ohio State	W 89–73	16–0	University Hall (9,000); Charlottesville, Virginia
Jan. 28	No. 1	No. 6 Wake Forest	W 83–73	17–0 (7–0)	University Hall (9,000); Charlottesville, Virginia
Jan. 31	No. 1	Duke	W 68–47	18–0 (8–0)	University Hall (9,000); Charlottesville, Virginia
Feb. 3	No. 1	at No. 11 North Carolina	W 80–79 ^{OT}	19–0 (9–0)	Carmichael Arena (10,000); Chapel Hill, North Carolina
Feb. 5*	No. 1	at Wagner	W 76–69	20–0	Madison Square Garden (11,997); New York City
Feb. 11	No. 1	at NC State	W 51–46	21–0 (10–0)	Reynolds Coliseum (12,400); Raleigh, North Carolina
Feb. 14	No. 1	Clemson	W 73–58	22–0 (11–0)	University Hall (9,000); Charlottesville, Virginia
Feb. 16	No. 1	Georgia Tech	W 83–42	23–0 (12–0)	University Hall (9,000); Charlottesville, Virginia
Feb. 22*	No. 1	vs. No. 11 Notre Dame	L 56–57	23–1	Rosemont Horizon (16,546); Rosemont, Illinois
Feb. 25	No. 3	at No. 12 Wake Forest	L 66–73 ^{OT}	23–2 (12–1)	Winston-Salem Memorial Coliseum (8,200); Winston-Salem, North Carolina
Feb. 28	No. 3	No. 17 Maryland	W 74–63	24–2 (13–1)	University Hall (9,000); Charlottesville, Virginia
ACC Tournament
Mar. 5	(1) No. 4	vs. (8) Georgia Tech; ACC Quarterfinals	W 76–47	25–2	Capital Centre (19,035); Landover, Maryland
Mar. 6	(1) No. 4	vs. (4) No. 20 Maryland; ACC Semifinals	L 62–85	25–3	Capital Centre (19,035); Landover, Maryland
NCAA Tournament
Mar. 15*	(1 E) No. 5	vs. (9 E) Villanova; Second round	W 54–50	26–3	Charlotte Coliseum; Charlotte, North Carolina
Mar. 19*	(1 E) No. 5	vs. (4 E) No. 15 Tennessee; Sweet Sixteen	W 62–48	27–3	Omni Coliseum; Atlanta
Mar. 21*	(1 E) No. 5	vs. (6 E) No. 16 BYU; Elite Eight	W 74–60	28–3	Omni Coliseum (15,461); Atlanta
Mar. 28	(1 E) No. 5	vs. (2 W) No. 6 North Carolina; National Semifinal	L 65–78	28–4	The Spectrum (18,276); Philadelphia
Mar. 30*; 6:00 p.m.	(1 E) No. 5	vs. (1 MW) No. 4 LSU; Third-place game	W 78–74	29–4	The Spectrum (18,276); Philadelphia
*Non-conference game. ^{#}Rankings from AP poll. (#) Tournament seedings in parentheses. All times are in Eastern time.

== Awards and honors ==
- Ralph Sampson, Adolph Rupp Trophy
- Ralph Sampson, AP Player of the Year
- Ralph Sampson, Naismith College Player of the Year
- Ralph Sampson, USBWA College Player of the Year
- Ralph Sampson, UPI Player of the Year
- Ralph Sampson, Consensus 1st Team All-American
- Ralph Sampson, ACC Player of the Year
- Ralph Sampson, 1st Team All-ACC
- Jeff Lamp, Consensus 2nd Team All-American
- Jeff Lamp, 1st Team All-ACC

== NBA draft ==
Year	Round	Pick	Player	NBA club
1981	1	15	Jeff Lamp	Portland Trail Blazers
1981	4	77	Lee Raker	San Diego Clippers
1981	7	159	Lewis Latimore	Milwaukee Bucks
1982	4	77	Jeff Jones	Indiana Pacers
1983	1	1	Ralph Sampson	Houston Rockets
1983	3	68	Craig Robinson	Boston Celtics
1984	2	35	Othell Wilson	Golden State Warriors
