= 1980–81 NC State Wolfpack men's basketball team =

American college basketball season

1980–81 NC State Wolfpack men's basketball
- Conference: Atlantic Coast Conference
- Record: 14–13 (4–10 ACC)
- Head coach: Jim Valvano (1st season)
- Assistant coaches: Marty Fletcher (3rd season); Ray Martin (1st season)
- Home arena: Reynolds Coliseum

1980–81 ACC men's basketball standings
	Conf.				Overall
Team	W		L	PCT	W		L	PCT
No. 5 Virginia	13	–	1	.929	29	–	4	.879
No. 6 North Carolina †	10	–	4	.714	29	–	8	.784
No. 11 Wake Forest	9	–	5	.643	22	–	7	.759
No. 18 Maryland	8	–	6	.571	21	–	10	.677
Duke	6	–	8	.429	17	–	13	.567
Clemson	6	–	8	.429	20	–	11	.645
NC State	4	–	10	.286	14	–	13	.519
Georgia Tech	0	–	14	.000	4	–	23	.148
† 1981 ACC tournament winner Rankings from AP Poll

The 1980–81 NC State Wolfpack men's basketball team represented North Carolina State University during the 1980–81 men's college basketball season. It was Jim Valvano's first season as head coach.

== Roster ==
1980–81 NC State Wolfpack men's basketball team
Players
Coaches

Pos.	#	Name	Height	Weight	Year	Hometown
G	10	Max Perry	6 ft 1 in (1.85 m)	160 lb (73 kg)	Jr	Hanover, Indiana
G	12	Emmett Lay	6 ft 4 in (1.93 m)	185 lb (84 kg)	Jr	Tabor City, North Carolina
G	14	Phil Weber	6 ft 1 in (1.85 m)	165 lb (75 kg)	So	Northport, New York
G	25	Dereck Whittenburg	6 ft 1 in (1.85 m)	195 lb (88 kg)	So	Glenarden, Maryland
F	30	Harold Thompson	6 ft 5 in (1.96 m)	206 lb (93 kg)	Fr	Raeford, North Carolina
F	33	Art Jones	6 ft 7 in (2.01 m)	185 lb (84 kg)	Sr	Hampton, Virginia
G	34	Kenny Matthews	6 ft 4 in (1.93 m)	—	Sr	Washington, D.C.
G	35	Sidney Lowe	6 ft 0 in (1.83 m)	195 lb (88 kg)	So	Washington, D.C.
F	40	Scott Parzych	6 ft 7 in (2.01 m)	—	Jr	Lockport, Illinois
C	41	Thurl Bailey	6 ft 11 in (2.11 m)	230 lb (104 kg)	So	Washington, D.C.
C	42	Craig Watts	7 ft 0 in (2.13 m)	224 lb (102 kg)	Sr	South Easton, Massachusetts
C	52	Chuck Nevitt	7 ft 5 in (2.26 m)	220 lb (100 kg)	Jr	Marietta, Georgia

Head coach

- Jim Valvano (Rutgers)

Assistant coach(es)

- Marty Fletcher (Maryland)
- Ray Martin (Notre Dame)

Legend

- (C) Team captain
- (S) Suspended
- (I) Ineligible
- (W) Walk-on
- Injured
- Current redshirt

== Schedule ==
Date time, TV	Rank^{#}	Opponent^{#}	Result	Record	Site city, state
Regular season
November 29*		UNC Wilmington	W 83–59	1–0	Reynolds Coliseum; Raleigh, North Carolina
Dec 1, 1980*		Davidson	W 89–72	2–0	Reynolds Coliseum; Raleigh, North Carolina
Dec 5, 1980*		vs. Wake Forest; Big Four Tournament	L 57–87	2–1	Greensboro Coliseum; Greensboro, North Carolina
Dec 6, 1980*		vs. Duke; Big Four Tournament	W 74–60	3–1	Greensboro Coliseum (15,333); Greensboro, North Carolina
Dec 13, 1980*		Campbell	W 82–56	4–1	Reynolds Coliseum; Raleigh, North Carolina
Dec 17, 1980*		Appalachian State	W 71–47	5–1	Reynolds Coliseum; Raleigh, North Carolina
Dec 20, 1980		at No. 9 Maryland	L 75–82	5–2 (0–1)	Cole Fieldhouse; College Park, Maryland
Dec 26, 1980*		vs. Iona; ECAC Holiday Festival Semifinal	W 61–58	6–2	Madison Square Garden; New York, New York
Dec 27, 1980*		at St. John's; ECAC Holiday Festival Championship	W 64–55	7–2	Madison Square Garden; New York, New York
Jan 3, 1981		at Clemson	L 68–76	7–3 (0–2)	Littlejohn Coliseum; Clemson, South Carolina
Jan 7, 1981		at No. 3 Virginia	L 55–63	7–4 (0–3)	University Hall (5,100); Charlottesville, Virginia
Jan 10, 1981		Georgia Tech	W 93–68	8–4 (1–3)	Reynolds Coliseum; Raleigh, North Carolina
Jan 14, 1981		at No. 17 North Carolina	L 70–73	8–5 (1–4)	Carmichael Auditorium; Chapel Hill, North Carolina
Jan 17, 1981		at No. 5 Wake Forest	L 52–60	8–6 (1–5)	Winston-Salem Memorial Coliseum; Winston-Salem, North Carolina
Jan 21, 1981*		Duke	L 47–56	8–7 (1–6)	Reynolds Coliseum; Raleigh, North Carolina
Jan 24, 1981*		East Carolina	W 77–52	9–7	Reynolds Coliseum; Raleigh, North Carolina
Jan 28, 1981		at Georgia Tech	W 70–55	10–7 (2–6)	Alexander Memorial Coliseum; Atlanta, Georgia
Jan 31, 1981		No. 12 North Carolina	L 54–57	10–8 (2–7)	Reynolds Coliseum; Raleigh, North Carolina
Feb 4, 1981		Clemson	L 76–82	10–9 (2–8)	Reynolds Coliseum; Raleigh, North Carolina
Feb 6, 1981*		Furman	W 77–60	11–9	Reynolds Coliseum; Raleigh, North Carolina
Feb 7, 1981*		Saint Joseph's	W 47–42	12–9	Reynolds Coliseum (11,198); Raleigh, North Carolina
Feb 11, 1981		No. 1 Virginia	L 46–51	12–10 (2–9)	Reynolds Coliseum (12,400); Raleigh, North Carolina
Feb 14, 1981*		No. 12 Notre Dame	L 55–71	12–11	Reynolds Coliseum; Raleigh, North Carolina
Feb 19, 1981		at Duke	W 52–51	13–11 (3–9)	Cameron Indoor Stadium; Durham, North Carolina
Feb 25, 1981		No. 17 Maryland	L 72–76	13–12 (3–10)	Reynolds Coliseum; Raleigh, North Carolina
Feb 28, 1981		No. 12 Wake Forest	W 66–65	14–12 (4–10)	Reynolds Coliseum; Raleigh, North Carolina
ACC Tournament
March 5*	(7)	vs. (2) No. 12 North Carolina; Quarterfinals	L 54–69	14–13	Greensboro Coliseum; Greensboro, NC
*Non-conference game. ^{#}Rankings from AP Poll. (#) Tournament seedings in parentheses. All times are in Eastern Time.
