= 1980–81 Maryland Terrapins men's basketball team =

American college basketball season

1980–81 Maryland Terrapins men's basketball

NCAA tournament, Second round
- Conference: Atlantic Coast Conference

Ranking
- Coaches: No. 20
- AP: No. 18
- Record: 21–10 (8–6 ACC)
- Head coach: Lefty Driesell (10th season)
- Assistant coach: Tom Abatemarco (2nd season)
- Home arena: Cole Field House

1980–81 ACC men's basketball standings
	Conf.				Overall
Team	W		L	PCT	W		L	PCT
No. 5 Virginia	13	–	1	.929	29	–	4	.879
No. 6 North Carolina †	10	–	4	.714	29	–	8	.784
No. 11 Wake Forest	9	–	5	.643	22	–	7	.759
No. 18 Maryland	8	–	6	.571	21	–	10	.677
Duke	6	–	8	.429	17	–	13	.567
Clemson	6	–	8	.429	20	–	11	.645
NC State	4	–	10	.286	14	–	13	.519
Georgia Tech	0	–	14	.000	4	–	23	.148
† 1981 ACC tournament winner Rankings from AP Poll

The 1980–81 Maryland Terrapins men's basketball team represented the University of Maryland as a member of the Atlantic Coast Conference during the 1980–81 men's college basketball season. The team was led by head coach Lefty Driesell and played their home games at Cole Field House in College Park, Maryland. The Terrapins finished the season with a 21–10 overall record (8–6 ACC), and reached the second round of the NCAA tournament before losing to No. 3 seed and eventual National champion Indiana.

== Roster ==
1980–81 Maryland Terrapins men's basketball team
Players
Coaches

Pos.	#	Name	Height	Weight	Year	Hometown
F	25	Ernie Graham	6 ft 7 in (2.01 m)	—	Sr
F	52	Buck Williams	6 ft 8 in (2.03 m)	210 lb (95 kg)	Jr	Rocky Mount, NC
G	55	Albert King	6 ft 6 in (1.98 m)	—	Sr	Brooklyn, NY

Head coach

- Charles "Lefty" Driesell

Assistant coach(es)

- Tom Abatemarco (Dowling)

Legend

- (C) Team captain
- (S) Suspended
- (I) Ineligible
- (W) Walk-on
- Injured
- Current redshirt

Roster

== Schedule ==
Date time, TV	Rank^{#}	Opponent^{#}	Result	Record	Site city, state
Regular season
Nov 28, 1980*	No. 4	Navy	W 86–64	1–0	Cole Fieldhouse; College Park, Maryland
Dec 2, 1980*	No. 4	American	W 95–65	2–0	Cole Fieldhouse; College Park, Maryland
Dec 5, 1980*	No. 4	vs. Wagner; Carrier Classic	W 96–73	3–0	Carrier Dome; Syracuse, New York
Dec 6, 1980*	No. 4	at No. 18 Syracuse; Carrier Classic	W 83–73	4–0	Carrier Dome; Syracuse, New York
Dec 10, 1980*	No. 4	Fairleigh Dickinson	W 109–83	5–0	Cole Fieldhouse; College Park, Maryland
Dec 13, 1980*	No. 4	at Louisville	L 67–78	5–1	Freedom Hall; Louisville, Kentucky
Dec 20, 1980	No. 9	NC State	W 82–75	6–1 (1–0)	Cole Fieldhouse; College Park, Maryland
Dec 23, 1980	No. 9	at Georgia Tech	W 66–55	7–1 (2–0)	Alexander Memorial Coliseum; Atlanta, Georgia
Dec 29, 1980*	No. 9	Marshall	W 114–89	8–1	Cole Fieldhouse; College Park, Maryland
Dec 30, 1980*	No. 9	Saint Joseph's	W 74–57	9–1	Cole Fieldhouse; College Park, Maryland
Jan 3, 1981*	No. 9	William & Mary	W 69–64	10–1	Cole Fieldhouse; College Park, Maryland
Jan 7, 1981	No. 8	at No. 16 North Carolina	L 66–75	10–2 (2–1)	Carmichael Auditorium; Chapel Hill, North Carolina
Jan 10, 1981	No. 8	Duke; Rivalry	W 94–79	11–2 (3–1)	Cole Fieldhouse; College Park, Maryland
Jan 14, 1981	No. 10	No. 2 Virginia	L 64–66	11–3 (3–2)	Cole Fieldhouse; College Park, Maryland
Jan 17, 1981	No. 10	at No. 19 Clemson	W 68–62	12–3 (4–2)	Littlejohn Coliseum; Clemson, South Carolina
Jan 21, 1981*	No. 10	Maryland Eastern Shore	W 81–65	13–3	Cole Fieldhouse; College Park, Maryland
Jan 24, 1981*	No. 10	No. 13 Notre Dame	L 70–73	13–4	Cole Fieldhouse; College Park, Maryland
ACC Tournament
Mar 5, 1981*	No. 20	vs. Duke; Quarterfinals	W 56–53	19–8	Capital Centre; Landover, Maryland
Mar 6, 1981*	No. 20	vs. No. 4 Virginia; Semifinals	W 85–62	20–8	Capital Centre; Landover, Maryland
Mar 7, 1981*	No. 20	vs. No. 12 North Carolina; Championship game	L 60–61	20–9	Capital Centre; Landover, Maryland
NCAA Tournament
Mar 12, 1981*	(6 ME) No. 18	vs. (11 ME) Chattanooga; First round	W 81–69	21–9	University of Dayton Arena; Dayton, Ohio
Mar 14, 1981*	(6 ME) No. 18	vs. (3 ME) No. 9 Indiana; Second round	L 64–99	21–10	University of Dayton Arena; Dayton, Ohio
*Non-conference game. ^{#}Rankings from AP Poll. (#) Tournament seedings in parentheses. E=East. All times are in Eastern Time.
