= 1980–81 Creighton Bluejays men's basketball team =

American college basketball season

1980–81 Creighton Bluejays men's basketball

MVC tournament champion

NCAA tournament, second round
- Conference: Missouri Valley Conference
- Record: 21–9 (11–5 MVC)
- Head coach: Tom Apke (7th season)
- Home arena: Omaha Civic Auditorium

1980–81 Missouri Valley Conference men's basketball standings
	Conf.				Overall
Team	W		L	PCT	W		L	PCT
Wichita State	12	–	4	.750	26	–	7	.788
Creighton †	11	–	5	.688	21	–	9	.700
Tulsa	11	–	5	.688	26	–	7	.788
Drake	10	–	6	.625	18	–	11	.621
Bradley	10	–	6	.625	18	–	9	.667
New Mexico State	7	–	9	.438	10	–	17	.370
West Texas State	7	–	9	.438	16	–	11	.593
Indiana State	4	–	12	.250	9	–	18	.333
Southern Illinois	0	–	16	.000	7	–	20	.259
† 1981 MVC tournament winner Rankings from AP poll

The 1980–81 Creighton Bluejays men's basketball team represented Creighton University during the 1980–81 NCAA Division I men's basketball season. The Bluejays, led by head coach Tom Apke, played their home games at the Omaha Civic Auditorium. The Jays finished with a 21–9 record (11–5 MVC), and won the Missouri Valley Conference tournament to earn an automatic bid to the 1981 NCAA tournament. As No. 8 seed in the Mideast region, the Jays fell to No. 9 seed Saint Joseph's in the opening round.

== Roster ==
1980–81 Creighton Bluejays men's basketball team
Players
Coaches

Pos.	#	Name	Height	Weight	Year	Previous school	Hometown
G	10	Mark Jones	6 ft 1 in (1.85 m)	—	So	Corning	Corning, Iowa
G	30	Kevin McKenna	6 ft 7 in (2.01 m)	190 lb (86 kg)	Sr		Palatine, Illinois
F	32	Alex Stivrins	6 ft 8 in (2.03 m)	210 lb (95 kg)	Fr		Lincoln, Nebraska
F	41	George Morrow	6 ft 7 in (2.01 m)	—	Sr		Memphis, Tennessee
F/C	51	Kevin Ross	6 ft 8 in (2.03 m)	—	Jr		Kansas City, Kansas

Head coach

- Tom Apke (Creighton)

Assistant coach(es)

Legend

- (C) Team captain
- (S) Suspended
- (I) Ineligible
- (W) Walk-on
- Injured
- Current redshirt

Roster

== Schedule and results ==
Date time, TV	Rank^{#}	Opponent^{#}	Result	Record	Site (attendance) city, state
Regular season
Nov 28, 1980*		Wisconsin–Superior	W 92–59	1–0	Omaha Civic Auditorium; Omaha, Nebraska
Dec 2, 1980*		Nebraska–Omaha	W 79–72	2–0	Omaha Civic Auditorium; Omaha, Nebraska
Dec 6, 1980*		Nebraska; Rivalry	W 66–61 ^{OT}	3–0	Omaha Civic Auditorium; Omaha, Nebraska
Dec 8, 1980*		at Saint Louis	W 64–57	4–0	St. Louis Arena; St. Louis, Missouri
Dec 9, 1980*		Loyola–Chicago	W 82–74	5–0	Omaha Civic Auditorium; Omaha, Nebraska
Dec 12, 1980*		at Iowa State	W 77–73	6–0	Hilton Coliseum; Ames, Iowa
Dec 22, 1980*		Canisius	W 72–52	7–0	Omaha Civic Auditorium; Omaha, Nebraska
Dec 28, 1980*		at South Florida	L 62–77	7–1	Sun Dome; Tampa, Florida
Jan 3, 1981		Tulsa	W 97–86	8–1 (1–0)	Omaha Civic Auditorium; Omaha, Nebraska
Jan 8, 1981		at Southern Illinois	W 78–62	9–1 (2–0)	SIU Arena; Carbondale, Illinois
Jan 10, 1981		at Indiana State	W 62–61	10–1 (3–0)	Hulman Center; Terre Haute, Indiana
Jan 15, 1981*		Marquette	L 66–76	10–2	Omaha Civic Auditorium; Omaha, Nebraska
Jan 17, 1981		Bradley	W 54–51	11–2 (4–0)	Omaha Civic Auditorium; Omaha, Nebraska
Jan 19, 1981		at Drake	L 70–71	11–3 (4–1)	Veterans Memorial Auditorium; Des Moines, Iowa
Jan 22, 1981		Wichita State	L 72–77	11–4 (4–2)	Omaha Civic Auditorium; Omaha, Nebraska
Jan 24, 1981		West Texas A&M	W 86–69	12–4 (5–2)	Omaha Civic Auditorium; Omaha, Nebraska
Jan 31, 1981		at Tulsa	L 84–87	12–5 (5–3)	Tulsa Convention Center; Tulsa, Oklahoma
Feb 2, 1981		Southern Illinois	W 50–43	13–5 (6–3)	Omaha Civic Auditorium; Omaha, Nebraska
Feb 5, 1981		Indiana State	W 65–62	14–5 (7–3)	Omaha Civic Auditorium; Omaha, Nebraska
Feb 7, 1981		at Bradley	L 80–93	14–6 (7–4)	Robertson Memorial Field House; Peoria, Illinois
Feb 9, 1981*		at No. 3 DePaul	L 57–83	14–7	Rosemont Horizon (16,473); Rosemont, Illinois
Feb 14, 1981		New Mexico State	W 95–83	15–7 (8–4)	Omaha Civic Auditorium; Omaha, Nebraska
Feb 19, 1981		Drake	W 73–69	16–7 (9–4)	Omaha Civic Auditorium; Omaha, Nebraska
Feb 21, 1981		at No. 14 Wichita State	L 70–83	16–8 (9–5)	Levitt Arena; Wichita, Kansas
Feb 26, 1981		at West Texas A&M	W 90–86	17–8 (10–5)	WT Fieldhouse; Canyon, Texas
Feb 28, 1981		at New Mexico State	W 84–78	18–8 (11–5)	Pan American Center; Las Cruces, New Mexico
Missouri Valley Conference tournament
Mar 5, 1981*	(2)	(7) Indiana State; Quarterfinals	W 64–61	19–8	Omaha Civic Auditorium; Omaha, Nebraska
Mar 6, 1981*	(2)	(3) Tulsa; Semifinals	W 66–64	20–8	Omaha Civic Auditorium; Omaha, Nebraska
Mar 7, 1981*	(2)	at (1) Wichita State; Championship game	W 70–64	21–8	Levitt Arena; Wichita, Kansas
1981 NCAA tournament
Mar 12, 1981*	(8 ME)	vs. (9 ME) Saint Joseph's; First round	L 57–59	21–9	University of Dayton Arena; Dayton, Ohio
*Non-conference game. ^{#}Rankings from AP poll. (#) Tournament seedings in parentheses. ME=Mideast. All times are in Central.
