= 1981 NCAA Division I basketball championship game =

Men's college basketball tournament game

1981 NCAA Tournament Championship Game
National championship game
North Carolina Tar Heels	Indiana Hoosiers
ACC	Big Ten
(29–7)	(25–9)
50	63
Head coach: Dean Smith	Head coach: Bob Knight
- AP: 6
- Coaches: 6
- AP: 9
- Coaches: 7
	1st half	2nd half	Total
North Carolina Tar Heels	26	24	50
Indiana Hoosiers	27	36	63
- Date: March 30, 1981
- Venue: The Spectrum, Philadelphia, Pennsylvania
- Referees: Ken Lauderdale, Lou Moser, & Booker Turner

United States TV coverage
- Network: NBC
- Announcers: Dick Enberg, Billy Packer, and Al McGuire

The 1981 NCAA Division I Basketball Championship Game took place on March 30, 1981, between the North Carolina Tar Heels and Indiana Hoosiers at The Spectrum in Philadelphia. The matchup was the final one of the forty-third consecutive NCAA Men's Division I Basketball Championship single-elimination tournament — commonly referred to as the NCAA Tournament — organized by the National Collegiate Athletic Association (NCAA) and is used to crown a national champion for men's basketball at the Division I level.

Because of the assassination attempt on President Ronald Reagan by John Hinckley, there was talk of postponing or cancelling the title game; but once NCAA officials learned that Reagan had made it through surgery and would survive his injuries, the game was played as scheduled. Howard Cosell criticized the NCAA for not postponing the game due to the Reagan assassination attempt.

Indiana defeated North Carolina by a 63–50 score to win their second national title in six years and fourth overall. As of 2026, this remains the only time a team from the Big Ten defeated an ACC team in the championship game.

The 1980–81 season was the last before the NCAA began sponsoring a championship for Division I women's basketball. All future NCAA men's tournaments and championship games would include "Men's" in their official titles.

== Participants ==
It was the first national championship game between the schools. Indiana was seeking its fourth national championship (1940, 1953, 1976) while North Carolina was looking for its second, having last won in 1957.

=== Indiana Hoosiers ===
- Mideast
  - (3) Indiana 99, (6) Maryland 64
  - (3) Indiana 87, (7) UAB 72
  - (3) Indiana 78, (9) St. Joseph's 46
- Final Four
  - (ME3) Indiana 67, (MW1) LSU 49

=== North Carolina Tar Heels ===
- West
  - (2) North Carolina 74, (10) Pittsburgh 57
  - (2) North Carolina 61, (3) Utah 56
  - (2) North Carolina 82, (8) Kansas State 68
- Final Four
  - (W2) North Carolina 78, (E1) Virginia 65

== Game summary ==
NBC

March 30, 1981

#ME3 Indiana Hoosiers 63, #W2 North Carolina Tar Heels 50
Scoring by half: 27-26, 36-24
Pts: Isiah Thomas 23; Rebs: Ray Tolbert 11; Asts: Jim Thomas 8	Pts: Al Wood 18; Rebs: Sam Perkins 8 Asts: Jimmy Black 6

The Spectrum, Philadelphia, Pennsylvania
Referees: Ken Lauderdale, Lou Moser, & Booker Turner

Starters:			Pts	Reb	Ast
F	32	Landon Turner	12	6	1
F	30	Ted Kitchel	0	0	0
G	11	Isiah Thomas	23	2	5
G	24	Randy Wittman	16	4	0
C	45	Ray Tolbert	5	11	0
Reserves:					
G	20	Jim Thomas	2	4	8
F	34	Steve Risley	5	4	0
Head coach:
Bob Knight

Indiana	North Carolina

Indiana	Statistics	North Carolina
23/48 (48%)	Field goals	20/47 (43%)
17/22 (77%)	Free throws	10/16 (63%)
31	Total rebounds	29
14	Assists	12
14	Turnovers	19
8	Steals	9
1	Blocks	2
17	Fouls	23

Starters:			Pts	Reb	Ast
F	33	James Worthy	7	6	2
F	30	Al Wood	18	6	2
G	21	Jimmy Black	6	2	6
G	11	Mike Pepper	6	1	0
C	41	Sam Perkins	11	8	1
Reserves:					
F	44	Matt Doherty	2	4	0
G	24	Jim Braddock	0	0	1
C	45	Chris Brust	0	0	0
C	34	Pete Budko	0	1	0
F	32	Eric Kenny	0	1	0
Head coach:
Dean Smith
