= 1980–81 Wake Forest Demon Deacons men's basketball team =

American college basketball season

1980–81 Wake Forest Demon Deacons men's basketball

NCAA Tournament, Second Round
- Conference: Atlantic Coast Conference

Ranking
- Coaches: No. 14
- AP: No. 11
- Record: 22–7 (9–5 ACC)
- Head coach: Carl Tacy
- Home arena: Winston-Salem Memorial Coliseum

1980–81 ACC men's basketball standings
	Conf.				Overall
Team	W		L	PCT	W		L	PCT
No. 5 Virginia	13	–	1	.929	29	–	4	.879
No. 6 North Carolina †	10	–	4	.714	29	–	8	.784
No. 11 Wake Forest	9	–	5	.643	22	–	7	.759
No. 18 Maryland	8	–	6	.571	21	–	10	.677
Duke	6	–	8	.429	17	–	13	.567
Clemson	6	–	8	.429	20	–	11	.645
NC State	4	–	10	.286	14	–	13	.519
Georgia Tech	0	–	14	.000	4	–	23	.148
† 1981 ACC tournament winner Rankings from AP Poll

The 1980–81 Wake Forest Demon Deacons men's basketball team represented Wake Forest University during the 1980–81 NCAA men's basketball season.

== Personnel ==
- Scott Davis
- Frank Johnson
- Jim Johnstone
- Guy Morgan
- Alvis Rogers
- Assistant coaches: Rich Knarr, Ernie Nestor
