= 1980–81 Wichita State Shockers men's basketball team =

American college basketball season

1980–81 Wichita State Shockers men's basketball

MVC regular season champions

NCAA tournament, Elite Eight
- Conference: Missouri Valley Conference
- Record: 26–7 (12–4 MVC)
- Head coach: Gene Smithson (3rd season)
- Home arena: Levitt Arena (10,506)

1980–81 Missouri Valley Conference men's basketball standings
	Conf.				Overall
Team	W		L	PCT	W		L	PCT
Wichita State	12	–	4	.750	26	–	7	.788
Creighton †	11	–	5	.688	21	–	9	.700
Tulsa	11	–	5	.688	26	–	7	.788
Drake	10	–	6	.625	18	–	11	.621
Bradley	10	–	6	.625	18	–	9	.667
New Mexico State	7	–	9	.438	10	–	17	.370
West Texas State	7	–	9	.438	16	–	11	.593
Indiana State	4	–	12	.250	9	–	18	.333
Southern Illinois	0	–	16	.000	7	–	20	.259
† 1981 MVC tournament winner Rankings from AP poll

The 1980–81 Wichita State Shockers men's basketball team represented Wichita State University in the 1980–81 NCAA Division I men's basketball season. They played their home games at the University of Wichita Field House. They were in their 36th season as a member of the Missouri Valley Conference and 75th season overall. They were led by head coach Gene Smithson in his third season at the school. They finished the season 26–7, 12–4 in Missouri Valley play to finish in first place. They received a bid to the 1981 NCAA Tournament and advanced to the regional finals before falling to LSU.

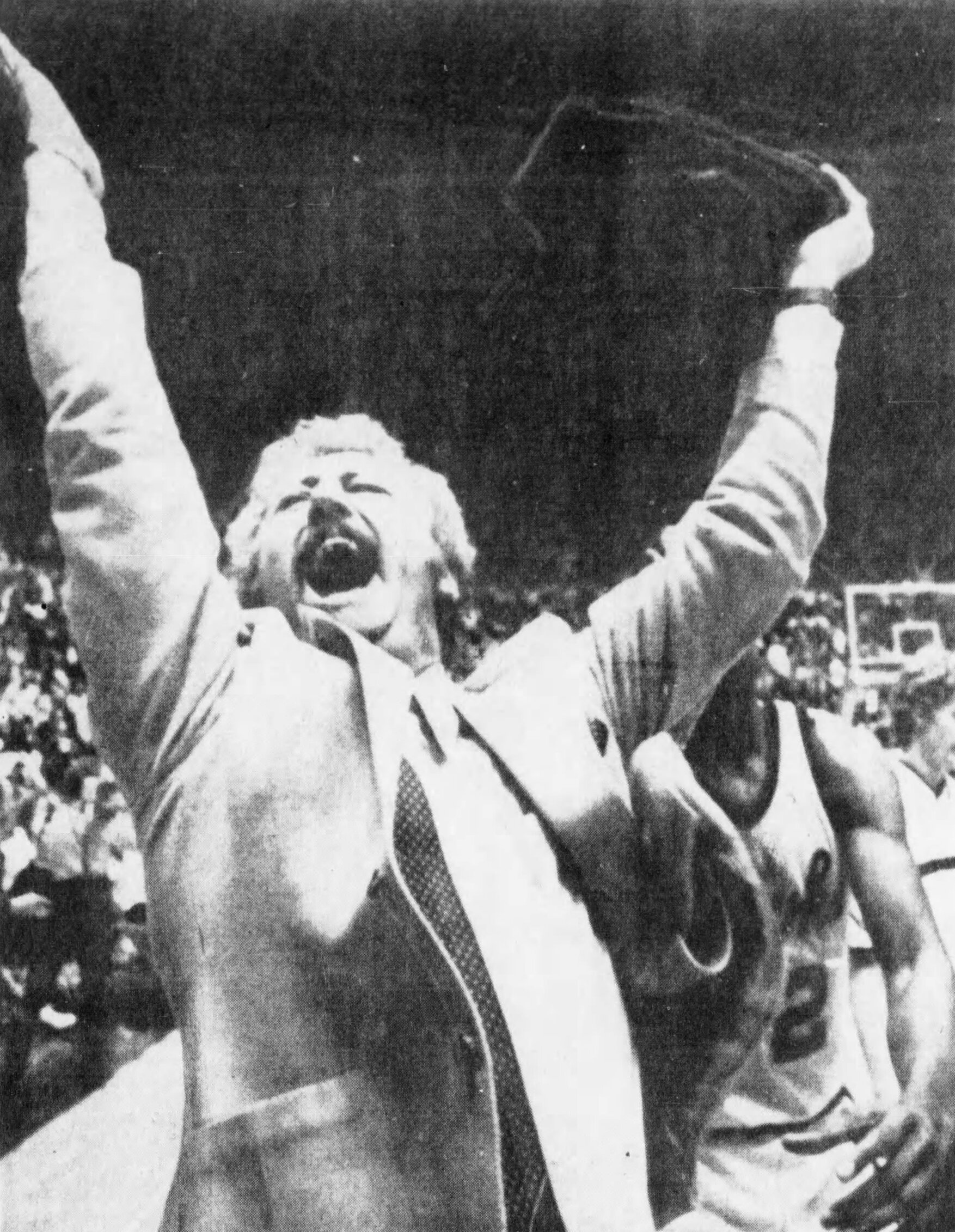
Coach Smithson celebrates after the Shockers upset Iowa in the NCAA tournament.

== Roster ==
1980–81 Wichita State Shockers men's basketball team
Players
Coaches

Pos.	#	Name	Height	Weight	Year	Hometown
C	0	Ozell Jones	6 ft 11 in (2.11 m)	220 lb (100 kg)	So	Long Beach, California
G	3	James Gibbs	5 ft 9 in (1.75 m)	165 lb (75 kg)	So	Mount Vernon, New York
G	10	Zoran Radović	6 ft 3 in (1.91 m)	175 lb (79 kg)	So	Belgrade, Yugoslavia
G	21	Tony Martin	6 ft 3 in (1.91 m)	175 lb (79 kg)	Jr	Willingboro, New Jersey
F	32	Jay Jackson	6 ft 7 in (2.01 m)	205 lb (93 kg)	Jr	Valley Falls, Kansas
G/F	33	Mike Jones	6 ft 5 in (1.96 m)	190 lb (86 kg)	Jr	Joliet, Illinois
F	35	Antoine Carr	6 ft 9 in (2.06 m)	225 lb (102 kg)	So	Wichita, Kansas
F	40	Karl Papke	6 ft 6 in (1.98 m)	185 lb (84 kg)	Fr	Wichita, Kansas
F	41	Mike Denny	6 ft 6 in (1.98 m)	195 lb (88 kg)	Sr	Midland, Texas
G	44	Randy Smithson	6 ft 3 in (1.91 m)	180 lb (82 kg)	Sr	Normal, Illinois
F	45	Eric Kuhn	6 ft 7 in (2.01 m)	225 lb (102 kg)	Jr	Wichita, Kansas
C	50	Žarko Đurišić	6 ft 10 in (2.08 m)	235 lb (107 kg)	Fr	Titograd, Yugoslavia
F/C	54	Cliff Levingston	6 ft 8 in (2.03 m)	210 lb (95 kg)	Jr	San Diego, California

Head coach

- Gene Smithson

Assistant coach(es)

Legend

- (C) Team captain
- (S) Suspended
- (I) Ineligible
- (W) Walk-on
- Injured
- Current redshirt

Roster

== Schedule and results ==
Date time, TV	Rank^{#}	Opponent^{#}	Result	Record	Site (attendance) city, state
Regular season
Nov 28, 1980*		Abilene Christian	W 101–60	1–0	Levitt Arena; Wichita, Kansas
Dec 1, 1980*		Hardin-Simmons	W 105–46	2–0	Levitt Arena; Wichita, Kansas
Dec 5, 1980*		McNeese State; McDonald's Classic	W 91–66	3–0	Levitt Arena; Wichita, Kansas
Dec 6, 1980*		Colorado State; McDonald's Classic	W 53–34	4–0	Levitt Arena; Wichita, Kansas
Dec 8, 1980*		Long Beach State	W 80–61	5–0	Levitt Arena; Wichita, Kansas
Dec 13, 1980*		Louisiana-Monroe	W 82–63	6–0	Levitt Arena; Wichita, Kansas
Dec 17, 1980*		Denver	W 93–60	7–0	Levitt Arena; Wichita, Kansas
Dec 20, 1980*		at Oral Roberts	W 83–61	8–0	Mabee Center; Tulsa, Oklahoma
Dec 23, 1980*		at Texas-Rio Grande Valley	L 82–83	8–1	UTPA Fieldhouse; Edinburg, Texas
Jan 3, 1981*		Iona	W 77–46	9–1	Levitt Arena; Wichita, Kansas
Jan 10, 1981		at Tulsa	L 84–91	9–2 (0–1)	Tulsa Convention Center; Tulsa, Oklahoma
Jan 12, 1981		West Texas A&M	W 100–85	10–2 (1–1)	Levitt Arena; Wichita, Kansas
Jan 15, 1981		New Mexico State	W 74–68	11–2 (2–1)	Levitt Arena; Wichita, Kansas
Jan 17, 1981		Southern Illinois	W 73–47	12–2 (3–1)	Levitt Arena; Wichita, Kansas
Jan 22, 1981		at Creighton	W 77–72	13–2 (4–1)	Omaha Civic Auditorium; Omaha, Nebraska
Feb 7, 1981		Drake	W 79–67	17–2 (8–1)	Levitt Arena; Wichita, Kansas
Feb 9, 1981		at Southern Illinois	W 81–61	18–2 (9–1)	SIU Arena; Carbondale, Illinois
Feb 12, 1981		Bradley	W 87–65	19–2 (10–1)	Levitt Arena; Wichita, Kansas
Feb 16, 1981		Tulsa	L 72–74	19–3 (10–2)	Levitt Arena; Wichita, Kansas
Feb 19, 1981		at New Mexico State	L 60–82	19–4 (10–3)	Pan American Center; Las Cruces, New Mexico
Feb 21, 1981		Creighton	W 83–70	20–4 (11–3)	Levitt Arena; Wichita, Kansas
Feb 26, 1981		at Bradley	W 70–57	21–4 (12–3)	Robertson Memorial Field House; Peoria, Illinois
Feb 28, 1981	No. 19	at Indiana State	L 72–75	21–5 (12–4)	Hulman Center; Terre Haute, Indiana
MVC tournament
Mar 5, 1981*		Southern Illinois; Quarterfinal	W 77–57	22–5	Levitt Arena; Wichita, Kansas
Mar 6, 1981*		Drake; Semifinal	W 88–74	23–5	Levitt Arena; Wichita, Kansas
Mar 7, 1981*		Creighton; Championship Game	L 64–70	23–6	Levitt Arena; Wichita, Kansas
1981 NCAA tournament
Mar 13, 1981*	(6 MW)	vs. (11 MW) Southern; First round	W 95–70	24–6	Levitt Arena; Wichita, Kansas
Mar 15, 1981*	(6 MW)	vs. (3 MW) No. 13 Iowa; Second Round	W 60–56	25–6	Levitt Arena; Wichita, Kansas
Mar 20, 1981*	(6 MW)	vs. (7 MW) Kansas; Midwest Regional semifinal – Sweet Sixteen	W 66–65	26–6	Louisiana Superdome; New Orleans, Louisiana
Mar 22, 1981*	(6 MW)	vs. (1 MW) No. 4 Louisiana State; Midwest Regional final – Elite Eight	L 85–96	26–7	Louisiana Superdome; New Orleans, Louisiana
*Non-conference game. ^{#}Rankings from AP Poll. (#) Tournament seedings in parentheses. MW=Midwest. All times are in Central Time.

== Rankings ==
Ranking movements Legend: ██ Increase in ranking ██ Decrease in ranking — = Not ranked
	Week															
Poll	Pre	1	2	3	4	5	6	7	8	9	10	11	12	13	14	Final
AP	—	—	—	—	—	—	—	—	—	—	19	16	14	19	—	—
Coaches	—	—	—	—	—	—	—	—	—	—	20	19	15	18	—	—

== Awards and honors ==
- Antoine Carr – AP Honorable Mention All-American
- Cliff Levingston – AP Honorable Mention All-American
