= 1981 ACC men's basketball tournament =

- Classification: Division I
- Season: 1980–81
- Teams: 8
- Site: Capital Centre; Landover, Maryland
- Champions: North Carolina (9th title)
- Winning coach: Dean Smith (8th title)
- MVP: Sam Perkins (North Carolina)
- Television: C.D. Chesley

1980–81 ACC men's basketball standings
	Conf.				Overall
Team	W		L	PCT	W		L	PCT
No. 5 Virginia	13	–	1	.929	29	–	4	.879
No. 6 North Carolina †	10	–	4	.714	29	–	8	.784
No. 11 Wake Forest	9	–	5	.643	22	–	7	.759
No. 18 Maryland	8	–	6	.571	21	–	10	.677
Duke	6	–	8	.429	17	–	13	.567
Clemson	6	–	8	.429	20	–	11	.645
NC State	4	–	10	.286	14	–	13	.519
Georgia Tech	0	–	14	.000	4	–	23	.148
† 1981 ACC tournament winner Rankings from AP Poll

The 1981 Atlantic Coast Conference men's basketball tournament was held in Landover, Maryland, at the Capital Centre from March 5–7. North Carolina defeated Maryland, 61–60, to win the championship. Sam Perkins of North Carolina was named the tournament MVP.

== Bracket ==
Quarterfinals; March 5
1	#4 Virginia	76
8	Georgia Tech	47
4	#20 Maryland	56
5	Duke	53
2	#12 North Carolina	69
7	NC State	54
3	#11 Wake Forest	80
6	Clemson	71

Semifinals; March 6
1	#4 Virginia	62
4	#20 Maryland	85
2	#12 North Carolina	58
3	#11 Wake Forest	57

Championship Game; March 7
4	#20 Maryland	60
2	#12 North Carolina	61
