= Duke–Maryland men's basketball rivalry =

American college basketball rivalry

- Duke Blue Devils Maryland Terrapins
- Sport: Basketball
- First meeting: February 1926; Maryland 40, Duke 20
- Latest meeting: February 15, 2014; Duke 69, Maryland 67

Statistics
- Total meetings: 177
- All-time series: Duke leads, 114–63
- Largest victory: Duke, 104–72 (1964)
- Longest win streak: Duke, 15 (1988–1994)
- Current win streak: Duke, 1 (2014–present)

Locations of Duke and Maryland

The Duke–Maryland men's basketball rivalry was a college basketball rivalry between the Duke Blue Devils men's basketball team of Duke University and Maryland Terrapins men's basketball team of the University of Maryland. The basketball series has been called one of the most intense intercollegiate rivalries of modern times by some. A Harris Interactive poll of Marylanders ranked it the third best in the state behind the Commanders–Cowboys and Ravens–Commanders rivalries in 2003 (before the Beltway Series of the Orioles and Nationals was possible). In 2014, Maryland left the ACC for the Big Ten and regular season games between Maryland and Duke are no longer scheduled regularly.

== History ==
While Duke University and the University of North Carolina are considered to be each other's primary rivals, during the early 2000s the Duke–Maryland games had national implications, including in 2001 where Duke and Maryland met in the Final Four.

Year	Team	Game 1	Game 2	Game 3	Game 4	Overall record / ACC Record	Postseason
2011	Duke	71	80	87	N/A	(32–5)/(13–3)	NCAA 3rd round / ACC Champion
	Maryland	64	62	71	N/A	(19–14)/(7–9)	N/A / ACC quarterfinals
2010	Duke	77	72	N/A	N/A	(35–5)/(13–3)	National Champion / ACC Champion
	Maryland	56	79	N/A	N/A	(24–9)/(13–3)	NCAA 2nd round / ACC quarterfinals

The nature of the rivalry between Duke and Maryland is not viewed in the same manner by the schools' respective fans. While the Duke–UNC rivalry originated from geographic proximity and shared history, Duke fans do not view Maryland as a rival. However, several former Duke players have cited Maryland as the team against whom they played their most exciting games. Maryland fans traditionally see the Duke game as the biggest game of the year, as is true with most of Duke's opponents. Maryland fans have often rioted in College Park after home games, regardless of the outcome. Famously, one fan threw a bottle and hit Carlos Boozer's mother in her head after Duke's remarkable comeback from a 10-point deficit in the final minute to beat Maryland, requiring the University of Maryland to issue a public apology. One year, most fans in the student section right behind the basket had to leave or turn their t-shirts inside-out because they had a FCC-banned explicative ("F**K DUKE") that could not be shown on television. Michael Wilbon, a sports journalist who works for ESPN, was formerly a writer for The Washington Post, and owns a home in Bethesda, Maryland, refers to the Duke–Maryland rivalry as "[o]ne of the best rivalries in one of the best basketball leagues in the country." In 2014, the Washington Post produced a short documentary on the peak of the rivalry from 2001 and 2002 which included interviews with Coach Williams and several former players from both teams.

=== End of the rivalry ===
With the University of Maryland leaving the Atlantic Coast Conference to join the Big Ten Conference at the start of the 2014–15 academic year, the schools' basketball rivalry became dormant. While Maryland competed in the ACC for the 2013–14 basketball season, the conference's expansion to a fifteen-team league means that schools do not play every league opponent twice during a given season. Duke and Maryland played one time during the 2013–14 season on February 15, 2014, at Duke's Cameron Indoor Stadium. To some, including Duke basketball head coach Mike Krzyzewski, the emotion and spectacle that the Duke–Maryland rivalry brings to the ACC are "not going to be there for our conference and for Duke and Maryland anymore."

== Game results ==
Duke victories	Maryland victories	Tie games

No.	Date	Location	Winner	Score
1	1926	Unknown	Maryland	40–20
2	1930	College Park, MD	Duke	28–27
3	1930	Unknown	Duke	39–26
4	1931	Unknown	Maryland	32–24
5	1932	Durham, NC	Maryland	20–18^{OT}
6	1933	College Park, MD	Maryland	30–28
7	1934	College Park, MD	Maryland	37–33
8	1935	College Park, MD	Duke	48–39
9	1936	College Park, MD	Maryland	38–34
10	1936	Raleigh, NC	Maryland	47–35
11	1937	College Park, MD	Duke	34–31
12	1937	Durham, NC	Duke	34–30
13	1938	College Park, MD	Maryland	40–35
14	1938	Durham, NC	Duke	44–34
15	1938	Raleigh, NC	Duke	35–32
16	1939	College Park, MD	Maryland	37–34
17	1939	Durham, NC	Maryland	60–44
18	1940	College Park, MD	Maryland	32–30
19	1940	Durham, NC	Duke	48–27
20	1940	Raleigh, NC	Duke	44–32
21	1941	College Park, MD	Duke	40–26
22	1941	Durham, NC	Duke	43–17
23	1942	Durham, NC	Duke	37–33
24	1942	College Park, MD	Duke	64–46
25	1943	College Park, MD	Duke	46–43
26	1945	Durham, NC	Duke	51–24
27	1945	Raleigh, NC	Duke	76–49
28	1946	Durham, NC	Duke	59–25
29	1946	College Park, MD	Maryland	43–38
30	1947	College Park, MD	Duke	43–38
31	1948	Durham, NC	Duke	53–42
32	1950	Durham, NC	Duke	58–46
33	1950	College Park, MD	Maryland	67–57
34	1951	College Park, MD	Duke	49–40
35	1952	Durham, NC	Duke	56–51
36	1952	Raleigh, NC	#12 Duke	51–48
37	1953	Raleigh, NC	Maryland	74–65
38	1954	College Park, MD	#14 Duke	68–61
39	1954	College Park, MD	Maryland	49–47
40	1954	Durham, NC	Duke	68–61
41	1956	Durham, NC	#6 Duke	76–62
42	1956	College Park, MD	#8 Duke	82–70
43	1956	Raleigh, NC	#11 Duke	94–69
44	1957	College Park, MD	Maryland	62–51
45	1957	Durham, NC	#19 Duke	72–60
46	1958	College Park, MD	#11 Maryland	74–49
47	1958	Durham, NC	#7 Duke	68–59
48	1958	Raleigh, NC	#17 Maryland	71–65^{OT}
49	1959	College Park, MD	Maryland	64–33
50	1959	Durham, NC	Duke	78–69
51	1960	Durham, NC	Maryland	56–48
52	1960	College Park, MD	Maryland	71–61
53	1961	Durham, NC	#8 Duke	70–62
54	1961	College Park, MD	Maryland	76–71
55	1962	Durham, NC	#10 Duke	84–68
56	1962	College Park, MD	#7 Duke	79–53
57	1962	Raleigh, NC	#8 Duke	71–58
58	1962	Durham, NC	#2 Duke	92–56
59	1963	College Park, MD	#2 Duke	76–70
60	1964	College Park, MD	#7 Duke	104–72

No.	Date	Location	Winner	Score
61	1964	Durham, NC	#4 Duke	84–63
62	1965	Durham, NC	#10 Duke	82–64
63	1965	College Park, MD	Maryland	85–82
64	1966	Durham, NC	#1 Duke	76–61
65	1966	College Park, MD	#2 Duke	74–69
66	1967	College Park, MD	Duke	72–69^{OT}
67	1967	Durham, NC	Duke	81–58
68	1968	College Park, MD	Duke	84–52
69	1968	Durham, NC	Duke	85–64
70	1969	Durham, NC	Duke	96–85
71	1969	College Park, MD	Duke	93–83
72	1970	College Park, MD	Maryland	52–50
73	1970	Durham, NC	Duke	87–76
74	1971	Durham, NC	Maryland	88–79
75	1971	College Park, MD	Duke	70–67
76	1972	College Park, MD	Maryland	77–58
77	1972	Durham, NC	Duke	68–59
78	1973	Durham, NC	Duke	85–81
79	1973	College Park, MD	#8 Maryland	96–68
80	1974	College Park, MD	#6 Maryland	104–83
81	1974	Durham, NC	#5 Maryland	64–61
82	1974	Greensboro, NC	#4 Maryland	85–66
83	1975	College Park, MD	#5 Maryland	83–77
84	1975	Durham, NC	#4 Maryland	104–80
85	1976	College Park, MD	#5 Maryland	102–91
86	1976	Durham, NC	Duke	69–67
87	1976	Landover, MD	#9 Maryland	80–78^{OT}
88	1977	Durham, NC	Maryland	65–64^{OT}
89	1977	College Park, MD	Maryland	85–72
90	1978	College Park, MD	Duke	88–78
91	1978	Durham, NC	#20 Duke	81–70
92	1978	Greensboro, NC	#15 Duke	81–69
93	1979	Durham, NC	#3 Duke	87–78
94	1979	College Park, MD	Maryland	70–68
95	1980	College Park, MD	#12 Maryland	101–82
96	1980	Durham, NC	#16 Duke	66–61
97	1980	Greensboro, NC	Duke	73–72
98	1981	College Park, MD	#8 Maryland	94–79
99	1981	Durham, NC	Duke	55–54
100	1981	Landover, MD	#20 Maryland	56–53
101	1982	Durham, NC	Maryland	40–36
102	1982	College Park, MD	Maryland	77–60
103	1983	College Park, MD	Duke	86–67
104	1983	Durham, NC	Maryland	101–90
105	1984	Durham, NC	#5 Maryland	81–75
106	1984	College Park, MD	Duke	89–84
107	1984	Greensboro, NC	#14 Maryland	74–62
108	1985	College Park, MD	Maryland	78–76^{OT}
109	1985	Durham, NC	#5 Duke	70–62
110	1985	Atlanta, GA	#7 Duke	86–73
111	1986	College Park, MD	#3 Duke	81–75
112	1986	Durham, NC	#2 Duke	80–68
113	1987	College Park, MD	#14 Duke	85–61
114	1987	Durham, NC	#16 Duke	76–67
115	1988	Durham, NC	Maryland	72–69
116	1988	College Park, MD	#8 Duke	90–83
117	1989	College Park, MD	#1 Duke	82–72
118	1989	Durham, NC	#14 Duke	86–60
119	1990	Durham, NC	#10 Duke	91–80
120	1990	College Park, MD	#4 Duke	114–111^{OT}

No.	Date	Location	Winner	Score
121	1990	Charlotte, NC	#12 Duke	104–84
122	1991	College Park, MD	#14 Duke	94–78
123	1991	Durham, NC	#6 Duke	101–81
124	1992	College Park, MD	#1 Duke	83–66
125	1992	Durham, NC	#1 Duke	91–89
126	1992	Charlotte, NC	#1 Duke	94–87
127	1993	College Park, MD	#7 Duke	78–62
128	1993	Durham, NC	#6 Duke	95–79
129	1994	Durham, NC	#2 Duke	75–62
130	1994	College Park, MD	#2 Duke	73–69
131	1995	College Park, MD	#8 Maryland	74–72
132	1995	Durham, NC	#6 Maryland	94–92
133	1996	Durham, NC	Duke	83–73
134	1996	College Park, MD	Duke	77–75
135	1996	Greensboro, NC	Maryland	82–69
136	1997	College Park, MD	#7 Maryland	74–70
137	1997	Durham, NC	#7 Duke	81–69
138	1998	College Park, MD	#3 Duke	104–72
139	1998	Durham, NC	#1 Duke	86–59
140	1999	College Park, MD	#2 Duke	82–64
141	1999	Durham, NC	#2 Duke	95–77
142	2000	College Park, MD	#8 Duke	80–70
143	2000	Durham, NC	#23 Maryland	98–87
144	2000	Charlotte, NC	#3 Duke	81–68
145	2001	College Park, MD	#2 Duke	98–96^{OT}
146	2001	Durham, NC	#16 Maryland	91–80
147	2001	Atlanta, GA	#3 Duke	84–82
148	2001	Minneapolis, MN	#1 Duke	95–84
149	2002	Durham, NC	#1 Duke	99–78
150	2002	College Park, MD	#3 Maryland	87–73
151	2003	College Park, MD	#17 Maryland	87–72
152	2003	Durham, NC	#8 Duke	75–70
153	2004	College Park, MD	#1 Duke	68–60
154	2004	Durham, NC	#3 Duke	86–63
155	2004	Greensboro, NC	Maryland	95–87^{OT}
156	2005	Durham, NC	Maryland	75–66
157	2005	College Park, MD	Maryland	99–92^{OT}
158	2006	Durham, NC	#1 Duke	76–52
159	2006	College Park, MD	#2 Duke	96–88
160	2007	College Park, MD	Maryland	72–60
161	2007	Durham, NC	#24 Maryland	85–77
162	2008	College Park, MD	#4 Duke	93–84
163	2008	Durham, NC	#2 Duke	77–65
164	2009	Durham, NC	#2 Duke	85–44
165	2009	College Park, MD	#7 Duke	78–67
166	2009	Atlanta, GA	#9 Duke	67–61
167	2010	Durham, NC	#8 Duke	77–56
168	2010	College Park, MD	#22 Maryland	79–72
169	2011	Durham, NC	#1 Duke	71–64
170	2011	College Park, MD	#5 Duke	80–62
171	2011	Greensboro, NC	#5 Duke	87–71
172	2012	College Park, MD	#8 Duke	74–61
173	2012	Durham, NC	#10 Duke	73–55
174	2013	Durham, NC	#1 Duke	84–64
175	2013	College Park, MD	Maryland	83–81
176	2013	Greensboro, NC	Maryland	83–74
177	2014	Durham, NC	#8 Duke	69–67
Series: Duke leads 114–63
