= 1976 ACC men's basketball tournament =

- Classification: Division I
- Season: 1975–76
- Teams: 7
- Site: Capital Centre; Landover, Maryland
- Champions: Virginia (1st title)
- Winning coach: Terry Holland (1st title)
- MVP: Wally Walker (Virginia)

1975–76 ACC men's basketball standings
	Conf.				Overall
Team	W		L	PCT	W		L	PCT
No. 8 North Carolina	11	–	1	.917	25	–	4	.862
No. 11 Maryland	7	–	5	.583	22	–	6	.786
NC State	7	–	5	.583	21	–	9	.700
Clemson	5	–	7	.417	18	–	10	.643
Wake Forest	5	–	7	.417	17	–	10	.630
No. 18 Virginia †	4	–	8	.333	18	–	12	.600
Duke	3	–	9	.250	13	–	14	.481
† 1976 ACC tournament winner Rankings from AP Poll

The 1976 Atlantic Coast Conference men's basketball tournament was held in the Washington, D.C. suburb of Landover, Maryland, at the Capital Centre from March 4–6. Virginia defeated North Carolina, 67–62, to win the championship. In doing so, Virginia became the first ACC Tournament champion to defeat three teams ranked by the AP poll on their way to the championship.

This was the first ACC Tournament to be held outside the state of North Carolina, and only the third time that a team from outside that state won the tournament (Maryland in 1958, South Carolina in 1971).

Wally Walker of Virginia was named the tournament MVP.

== Bracket ==
Quarterfinals; March 4
4	Clemson	76
5	Wake Forest	63
2	#9 Maryland	80^{OT}
7	Duke	78
3	#17 NC State	63
6	Virginia	75

Semifinals; March 5
1	#4 North Carolina	82
4	Clemson	74
2	#9 Maryland	65
6	Virginia	73

Championship Game; March 6
1	#4 North Carolina	62
6	Virginia	67
