= Al Wood =

American basketball player (born 1958)

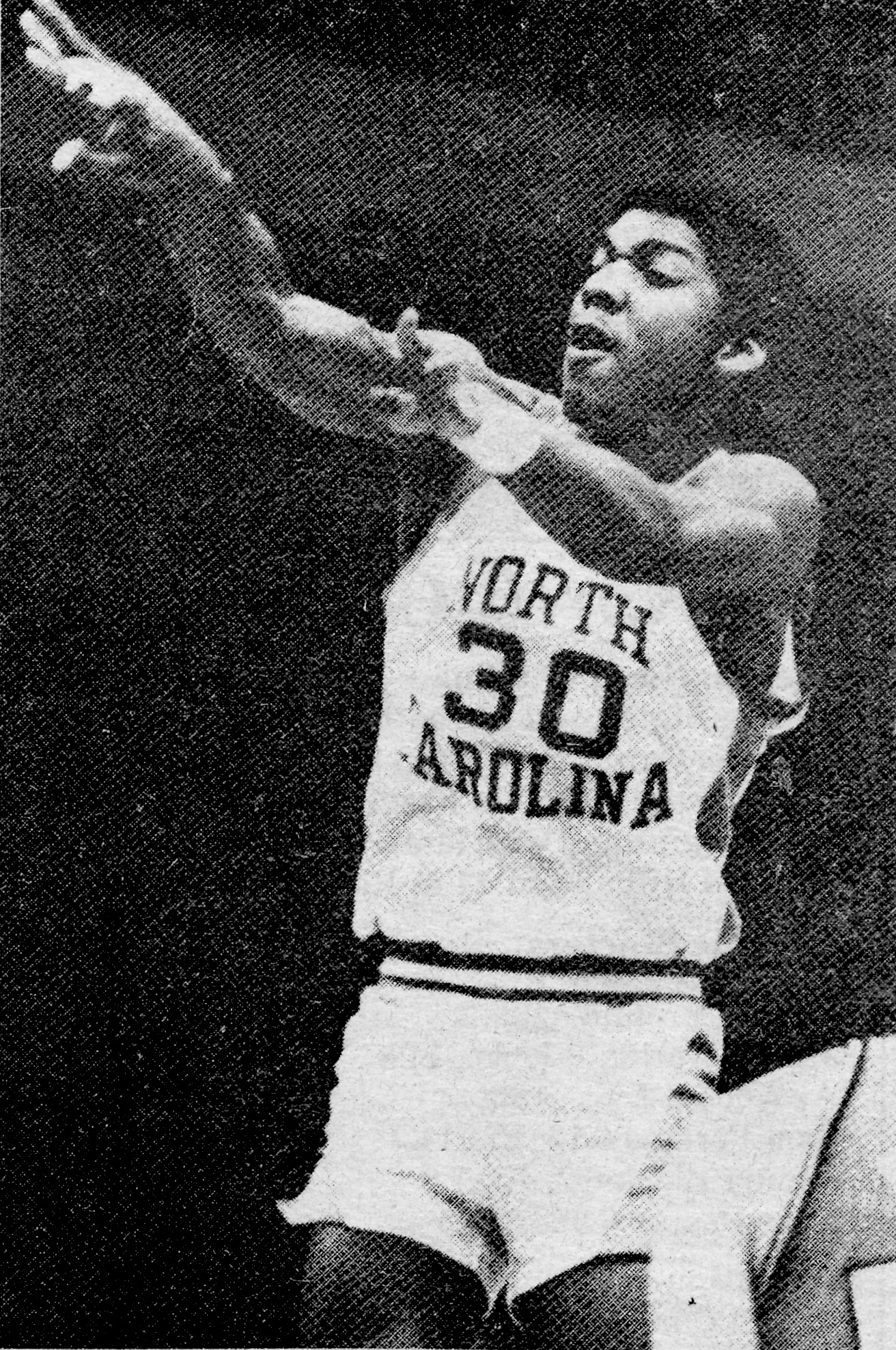
- Wood with North Carolina in 1981

Personal information
- Born: June 2, 1958 (age 68) Gray, Georgia, U.S.
- Listed height: 6 ft 6 in (1.98 m)
- Listed weight: 193 lb (88 kg)

Career information
- High school: Jones County (Gray, Georgia)
- College: North Carolina (1977–1981)
- NBA draft: 1981: 1st round, 4th overall pick
- Drafted by: Atlanta Hawks
- Playing career: 1981–1991
- Position: Small forward / shooting guard
- Number: 7, 4

Career history
- 1981–1982: Atlanta Hawks
- 1982–1983: San Diego Clippers
- 1983–1986: Seattle SuperSonics
- 1986–1987: Dallas Mavericks
- 1987–1988: Basket Mestre
- 1989–1990: Omaha Racers
- 1990–1991: FC Mulhouse Basket

Career highlights
- Consensus second-team All-American (1981); 2× First-team All-ACC (1979, 1981); Second-team All-ACC (1980); No. 30 honored by North Carolina Tar Heels; First-team Parade All-American (1977); McDonald's All-American (1977)

Career NBA statistics
- Points: 4,902 (11.8 ppg)
- Rebounds: 1,262 (3.0 rpg)
- Assists: 742 (1.8 apg)
- Stats at NBA.com
- Stats at Basketball Reference

Martin Alphonzo Wood (born June 2, 1958) is an American former professional basketball player who played in six National Basketball Association (NBA) seasons for four teams: the Atlanta Hawks, San Diego Clippers, Seattle SuperSonics and Dallas Mavericks. A 6 ft 6 in (1.98 m) All-American playing college basketball for the North Carolina Tar Heels, Wood was selected by the Hawks in the first round (4th pick overall) of the 1981 NBA draft.

Wood attended Jones County High School in Gray, Georgia. He was named to the inaugural McDonald's All-American team, which played in the 1977 Capital Classic. At the University of North Carolina at Chapel Hill, he averaged 16 points a game, averaged 5 rebounds a game and shot 56 percent from the field.

In his NBA career, Wood played in 417 games and scored 4,902 points. His best year as a professional came during the 1985–86 season as a member of the SuperSonics, appearing in 80 games and averaging 15.0 ppg.

== Career statistics ==
Legend
GP	Games played	GS	Games started	MPG	Minutes per game
FG%	Field goal percentage	3P%	3-point field goal percentage	FT%	Free throw percentage
RPG	Rebounds per game	APG	Assists per game	SPG	Steals per game
BPG	Blocks per game	PPG	Points per game	**Bold**	Career high

=== NBA ===
==== Regular season ====
Year	Team	GP	GS	MPG	FG%	3P%	FT%	RPG	APG	SPG	BPG	PPG
1981–82	Atlanta	19	0	12.5	.343	.000	.714	2.3	.6	.5	.1	4.8
1981–82	San Diego	29	5	23.9	**.518**	.167	.802	3.1	1.6	.8	.3	12.5
1982–83	San Diego	76	47	24.0	.464	**.300**	.770	3.1	1.8	.7	.5	10.9
1983–84	Seattle	**81**	**81**	27.6	.494	.143	**.823**	3.4	2.0	.8	.4	14.3
1984–85	Seattle	80	79	**31.8**	.485	.212	.776	**3.5**	**3.0**	**1.1**	**.7**	**15.0**
1985–86	Seattle	78	34	22.4	.435	.135	.782	3.1	1.5	.7	.2	11.6
1986–87	Dallas	54	0	12.2	.390	.280	.784	1.7	.6	.4	.2	6.6
Career		417	246	23.8	.465	.211	.789	3.0	1.8	.7	.4	11.8

==== Playoffs ====
Year	Team	GP	MPG	FG%	3P%	FT%	RPG	APG	SPG	BPG	PPG
1984	Seattle	5	31.4	.464	.000	.667	6.8	2.0	.2	.2	12.0
