= Cameron Indoor Stadium =

Indoor basketball arena at Duke University

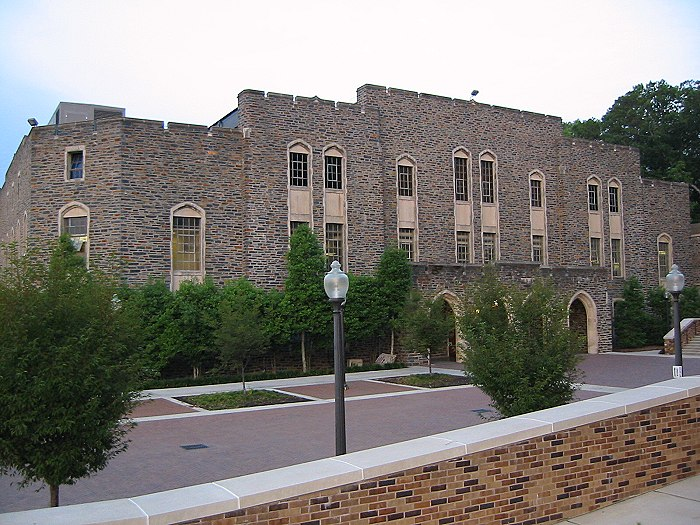
- North end in July 2002
- Interactive map of Cameron Indoor Stadium
- Former names: Duke Indoor Stadium (1940–72)
- Location: 115 Whitford Drive; Durham, North Carolina, U.S.
- Coordinates: 35.9976°N 78.9422°W
- Capacity: 9,314 (1988–present); 8,800 (1940–1988)
- Surface: Hardwood

Construction
- Opened: January 6, 1940; 86 years ago
- Renovated: 1987–88, 2002, 2006, 2008, 2015–16
- Cost: $450,000 ($9.19 million in 2025 dollars)
- Architects: Horace Trumbauer; Julian Abele

Tenants
- Duke Blue Devils (NCAA); Men's basketball (1940–present); Women's basketball (1975–present); Women's volleyball (1975–present)

Durham (the United States)

Cameron Indoor Stadium is an indoor arena located on the campus of Duke University in Durham, North Carolina. The 9,314-seat facility is the primary indoor athletic venue for the Duke Blue Devils and serves as the home court for Duke men's and women's basketball and women's volleyball. It opened in January 1940 and was known as Duke Indoor Stadium until 1972, when it was named for Eddie Cameron, who served at Duke as men's basketball coach from 1928 to 1942, as football coach from 1942 to 1945, and as athletic director from 1951 to 1972. The arena is located adjacent to its predecessor, Card Gymnasium, which opened in 1930.

== History ==
The plans for the stadium were drawn up in 1935 by basketball coach Eddie Cameron. The stadium was designed by Julian Abele, who studied at the Ecole des Beaux Arts in Paris, France. The same architectural firm that built the Palestra was brought in to build the new stadium. The arena was dedicated on January 6, 1940, having cost $400,000. At the time, it was the largest gymnasium in the country south of the Palestra at the University of Pennsylvania. Originally called "Duke Indoor Stadium", it was renamed for Cameron on January 22, 1972; that day the Blue Devils beat archrival North Carolina 76–74. The first nationally televised game took place on January 28, 1979, against Marquette; the 69–64 Duke win was broadcast by NBC. Regionally televised games in the Atlantic Coast Conference, including from the (then) Duke Indoor Stadium, had begun in the late 1950s.

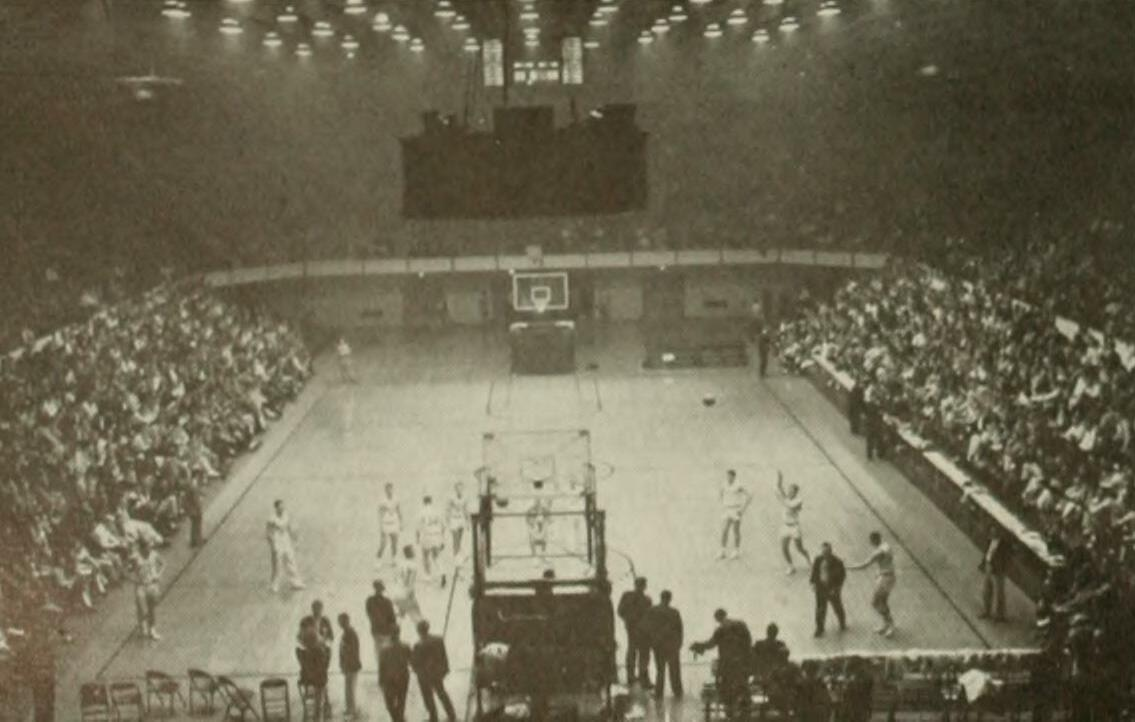
Opening night of the 1959–60 men's basketball season

The building originally included seating for 8,800, though standing room was sufficient to ensure that 9,500 could fit in on a particularly busy day. Then, as now, Duke students were allocated a large number of the seats, including those in the lower sections directly alongside the court. Renovations in 1987–1988 removed the standing room areas, added an electronic scoreboard and display over center court, wood paneling, brass railings and student seats, bringing capacity to 9,314, though now there is sufficient standing room to ensure 10,000 could fit. For high-profile games, students are known to pack in as many as 1,600 into the student sections, designed for a maximum of 1,100. Prior to the 2002–2003 basketball season, air conditioning units were installed in Cameron for the first time as a response to health and odor concerns for players and fans alike. Prior to the 2008–09 season, a new video scoreboard replaced the electronic board over center court. Before the 2009–10 season, additional changes were made, including installing LED ribbon boards to the front of the press table and painting the upper seats Duke blue. Cameron is one of two major arenas that use backboards suspended from the ceiling instead of anchored on the floor, the other being the CU Events Center in Boulder, Colorado.

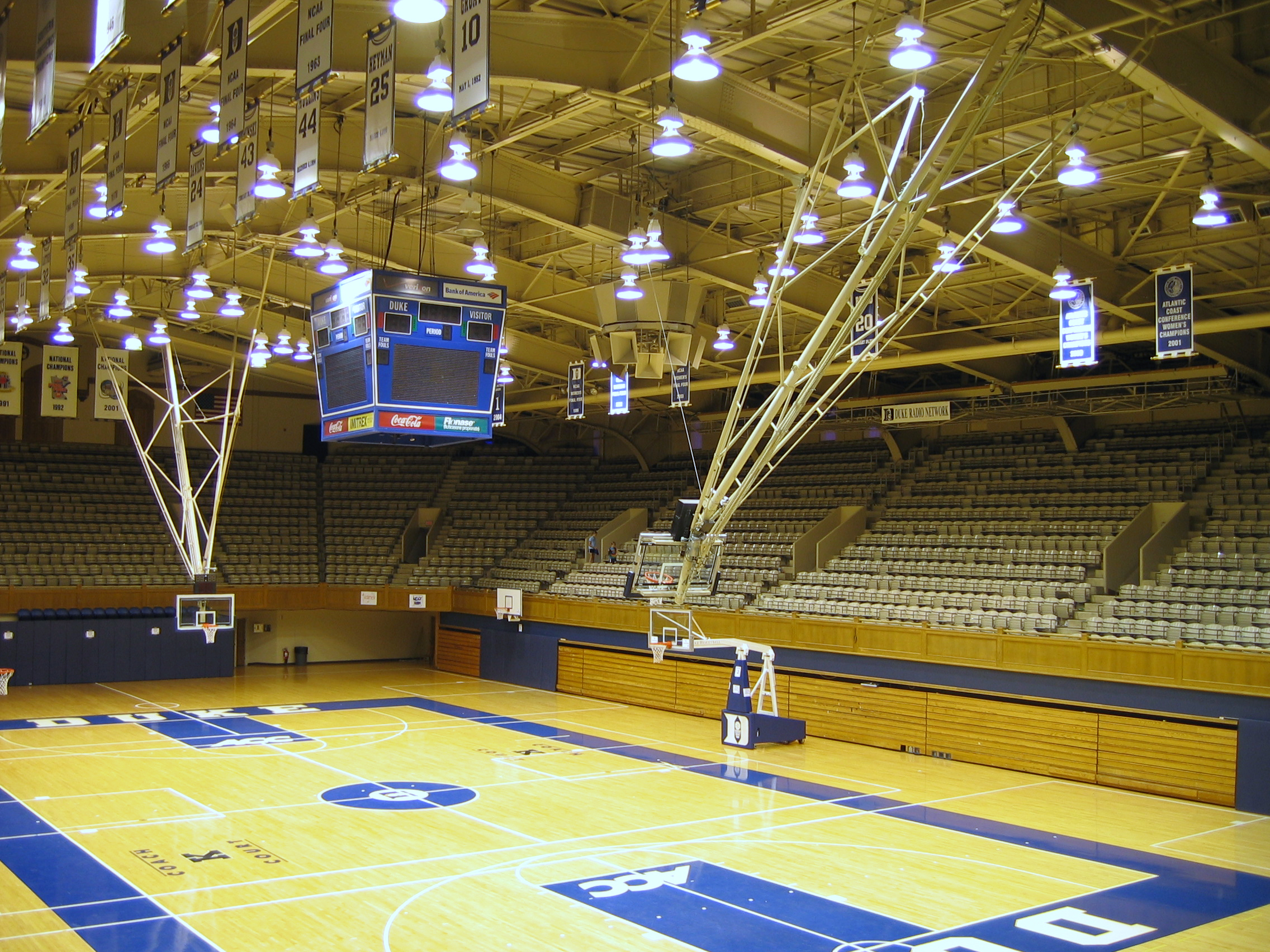
Summer of 2006

== Concerts ==
The Faces performed at Cameron on September 17, 1973.

The Grateful Dead played four shows here between 1973 and 1982 (December 8, 1973; September 23, 1976; April 12, 1978; April 2, 1982).

== Atmosphere ==
The students and fans are known as "Cameron Crazies" for their support of the team and loud cheering that has been recorded as high as 121.3 dB, which is louder than a power saw at 3 feet or a jackhammer.

For access to major games, including those against the University of North Carolina, students reside in tents for months in an area outside of Cameron known as "Krzyzewskiville", named after head coach Mike Krzyzewski. The hardwood floor was dedicated and renamed Coach K Court in November 2000 following a Duke victory over Villanova in the Preseason NIT that was Krzyzewski's 500th win as Duke head coach.

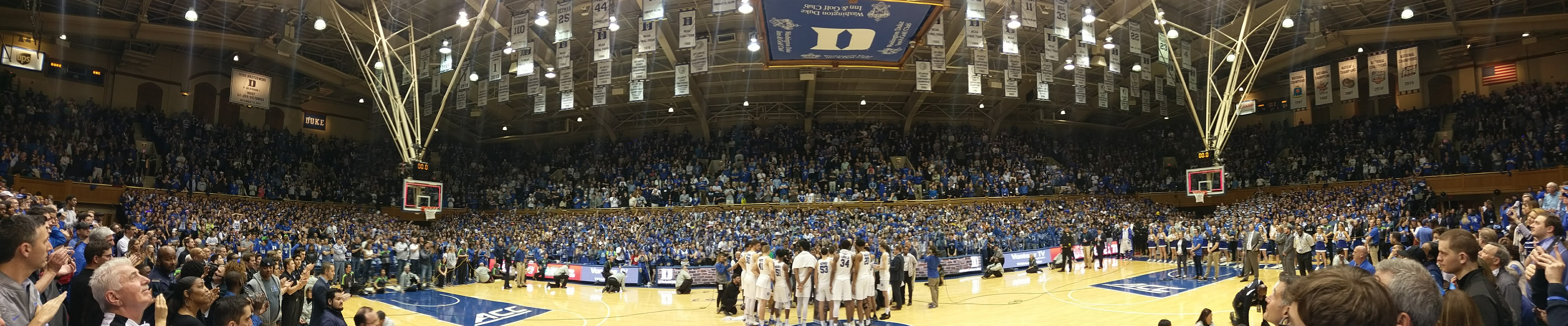
Duke players address the fans following a game against North Carolina in March 2018.

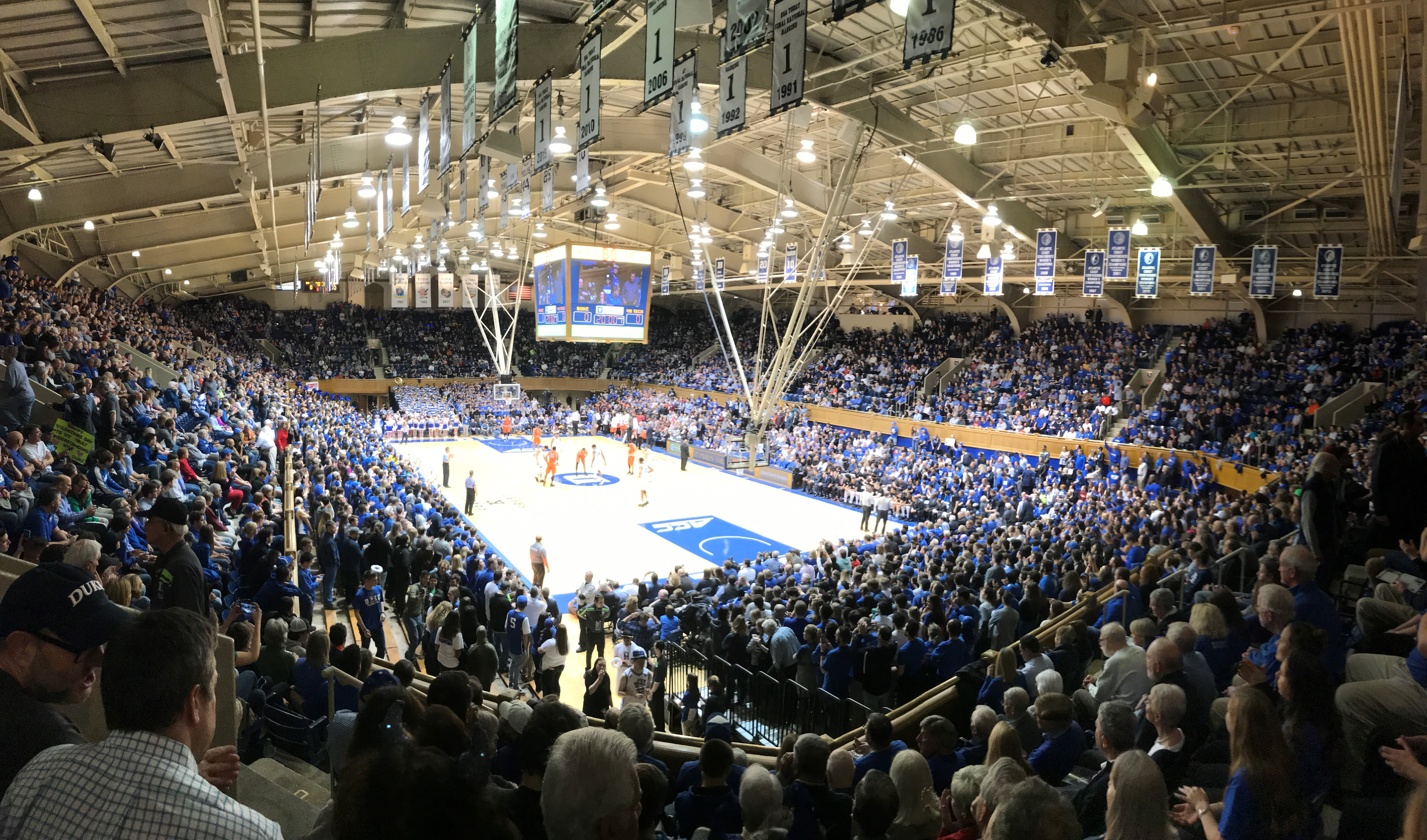
Duke Blue Devils vs. Virginia Tech Hokies, February 2018

== Media coverage ==
Sports Illustrated ranked it fourth on its list of the top 20 sporting venues of the 20th century, and USA Today referred to it as "the toughest road game in the ACC."

== Milestone games ==
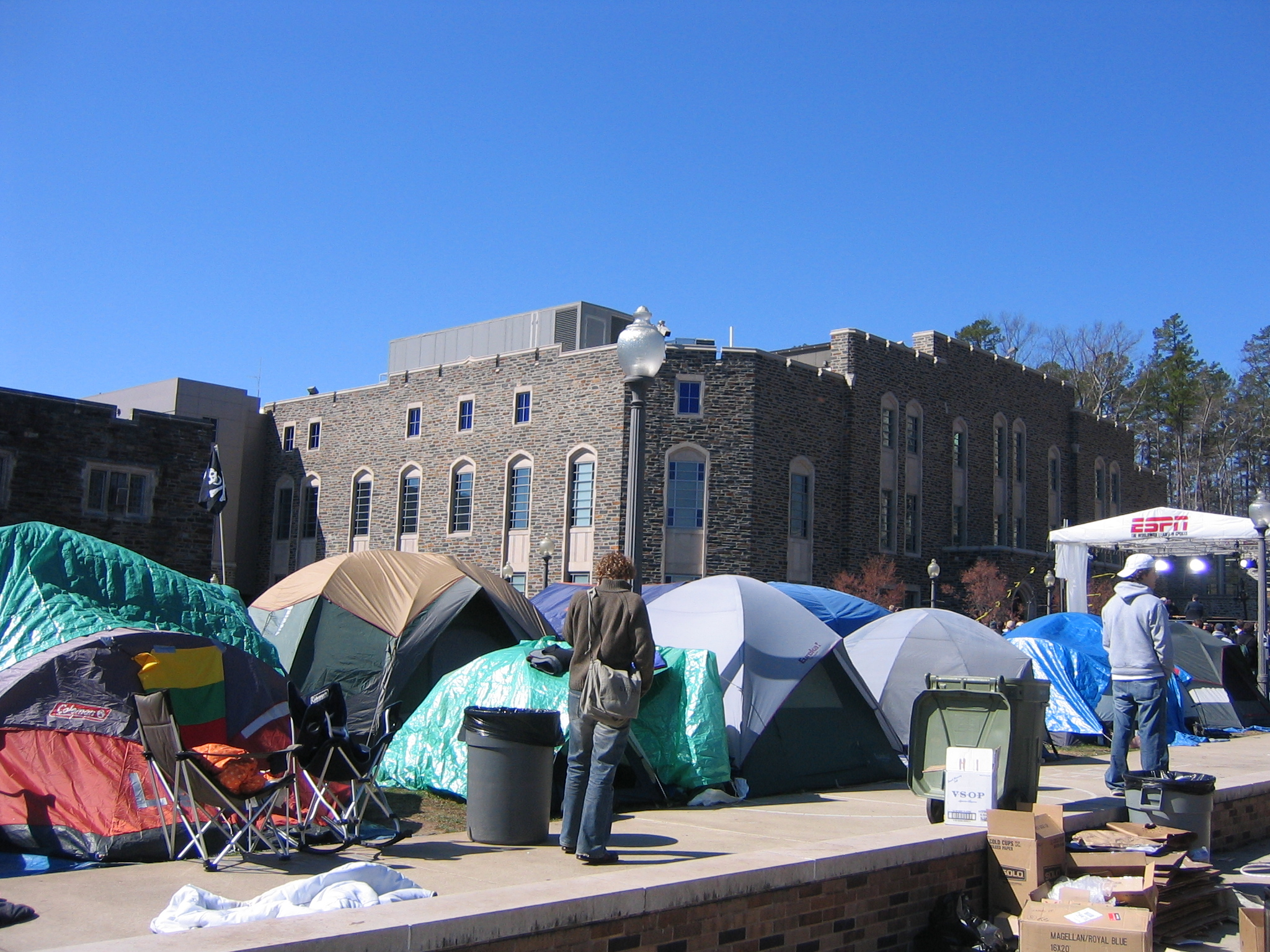
Exterior of Cameron Indoor Stadium as seen from Krzyzewskiville

Sources: Statistics published by Duke University as of the end of the 2023 season Duke Men's Basketball Media Guide;
Game no.	Date	Result
Game 1	January 6, 1940	Duke 36, Princeton 27
Game 100	January 24, 1948	Duke 52, Virginia Tech 45
Game 200	February 5, 1957	Duke 90, Pittsburgh 72
Game 300	January 28, 1967	Duke 99, North Carolina State 60
Game 400	February 25, 1976	Clemson 90, Duke 89
Game 500	January 11, 1984	Duke 73, Appalachian State 60
Game 600	December 1, 1990	Duke 111, Charlotte 94
Game 700	February 2, 1997	Duke 70, Georgia Tech 61
Game 800	February 8, 2004	Duke 81, Clemson 55
Game 900	February 4, 2010	Duke 86, Georgia Tech 67
Game 1,000	February 8, 2016	Duke 72, Louisville 65
Game 1,100	February 19, 2022	Duke 88, Florida State 70

Additionally, the facility hosted the Southern Conference men's basketball tournament from 1947 to 1950 and the MEAC men's basketball tournament in 1972 and 1973.

== Home court advantage ==
Records at Cameron Indoor Stadium
All-Time: 946–171 (.847)
Coach K: 572–76 (.883)
Since 1997–98: 396–37 (.915)

Duke is 284–30 (.904) at home since the 2004–05 season, second only to Allen Fieldhouse in winning percentage at home.

=== Non-conference win streaks ===
On November 26, 2019, the Duke men's team non-conference home winning streak of 150 games ended with an overtime loss to Stephen F. Austin, 85–83. It had been at that point the longest active non-conference home winning streak in college basketball, with Duke's last non-conference home loss coming against St. John's almost 19 years earlier on February 26, 2000, when the then #2 Blue Devils lost 83–82.

The streak was the longest non-conference home win streak in Duke men's basketball history, breaking the previous record, which lasted 95 games, from February 2, 1983, to December 2, 1995, beginning with a 73–71 win over William & Mary and ending with a 65–75 loss to Illinois.

Duke is now 274–7 in non-conference home games since 1983, starting with the win over William and Mary, having gone 32–3 in home non-conference games between the original and last winning streak. Duke lost to Illinois and St. John's during that span, as well as at the hands of Michigan 61–62 on December 8, 1996. Duke also lost to Michigan State and Illinois in 2021.

== See also ==
- Carolina–Duke rivalry
- Duke–Maryland rivalry
- List of NCAA Division I basketball arenas
