= Utah Utes men's basketball statistical leaders =

The Utah Utes men's basketball statistical leaders are individual statistical leaders of the Utah Utes men's basketball program in various categories, including points, assists, blocks, rebounds, and steals. Within those areas, the lists identify single-game, single-season, and career leaders. As of the next college basketball season in 2024–25, the Utes represent the University of Utah in the NCAA Division I Big 12 Conference.

Utah began competing in intercollegiate basketball in 1908. However, the school's record book does not generally list records from before the 1950s, as records from before this period are often incomplete and inconsistent. Since scoring was much lower in this era, and teams played much fewer games during a typical season, it is likely that few or no players from this era would appear on these lists anyway.

The NCAA did not officially record assists as a stat until the 1983–84 season, and blocks and steals until the 1985–86 season, but Utah's record books includes players in these stats before these seasons. These lists are updated through the end of the 2020–21 season.

== Scoring ==
Career
Rk	Player	Points	Seasons
1	Keith Van Horn	2,542	1993–94 1994–95 1995–96 1996–97
2	Billy McGill	2,321	1959–60 1960–61 1961–62
3	Josh Grant	2,000	1988–89 1989–90 1990–91 1991–92 1992–93
4	Luke Nevill	1,898	2005–06 2006–07 2007–08 2008–09
5	Branden Carlson	1,892	2019–20 2020–21 2021–22 2022–23 2023–24
6	Mike Newlin	1,849	1968–69 1969–70 1970–71
7	Luther Burden	1,790	1972–73 1973–74 1974–75
8	Jeff Judkins	1,740	1974–75 1975–76 1976–77 1977–78
9	Danny Vranes	1,701	1977–78 1978–79 1979–80 1980–81
10	Tom Chambers	1,698	1977–78 1978–79 1979–80 1980–81

Season
Rk	Player	Points	Season
1	Billy McGill	1,009	1961–62
2	Jerry Chambers	892	1965–66
3	Billy McGill	862	1960–61
4	Luther Burden	747	1974–75
5	Mike Newlin	729	1969–70
6	Andrew Bogut	715	2004–05
7	Luther Burden	712	1973–74
8	Keith Van Horn	705	1996–97
9	Keith Van Horn	694	1994–95
10	Keith Van Horn	686	1995–96

Single game
Rk	Player	Points	Season	Opponent
1	Billy McGill	60	1961–62	BYU
2	Billy McGill	53	1961–62	Montana
3	Billy McGill	51	1961–62	West Texas A&M 51
4	Billy McGill	50	1961–62	Wyoming
5	Jerry Chambers	48	1965–66	BYU
6	Jerry Chambers	47	1965–66	Seattle
	Billy McGill	47	1961–62	Arizona State
8	Billy McGill	45	1961–62	New Mexico
9	Luther Burden	44	1974–75	North Carolina
	Luther Burden	44	1974–75	Denver

== Rebounds ==
Career
Rk	Player	Rebounds	Seasons
1	Billy McGill	1,106	1959–60 1960–61 1961–62
2	Keith Van Horn	1,074	1993–94 1994–95 1995–96 1996–97
3	Josh Grant	1,066	1988–89 1989–90 1990–91 1991–92 1992–93
4	Mitch Smith	1,036	1985–86 1986–87 1987–88 1988–89
5	Danny Vranes	951	1977–78 1978–79 1979–80 1980–81
6	Luke Nevill	943	2005–06 2006–07 2007–08 2008–09
7	Alex Jensen	896	1994–95 1997–98 1998–99 1999–00
8	Ken Gardner	892	1968–69 1969–70 1970–71
9	Michael Doleac	886	1994–95 1995–96 1996–97 1997–98
10	Tom Chambers	876	1977–78 1978–79 1979–80 1980–81

Season
Rk	Player	Rebounds	Season
1	Billy McGill	430	1960–61
2	Andrew Bogut	427	2004–05
3	Mike Sojourner	402	1973–74
4	Billy McGill	391	1961–62
5	Jerry Chambers	360	1965–66
6	Gary Bergen	358	1954–55
7	Josh Grant	331	1992–93
	Mike Sojourner	331	1972–73
9	Art Bunte	330	1954–55
10	Jakob Poeltl	327	2015–16

Single game
Rk	Player	Rebounds	Season	Opponent
1	Billy McGill	24	1961–62	UCLA
2	Billy McGill	23	1961–62	L.A. State
3	Josh Grant	22	1992–93	BYU
	Mike Sojourner	22	1972–73	Utah State
5	Watkins Singletary	21	1987–88	Nevada
	Danny Vranes	21	1979–80	Utah State
	John Dearman	21	1971–72	UTEP
	John Allen	21	1962–63	Michigan State
9	Andrew Bogut	20	2004–05	New Mexico
	Tom Chambers	20	1979–80	Utah State
	John Dearman	20	1971–72	Washington State

== Assists ==
Career
Rk	Player	Assists	Seasons
1	Jeff Jonas	778	1973–74 1974–75 1975–76 1976–77
2	Andre Miller	721	1995–96 1996–97 1997–98 1998–99
3	Scott Martin	603	1977–78 1978–79 1979–80 1980–81
4	Pace Mannion	535	1979–80 1980–81 1981–82 1982–83
5	Brandon Taylor	428	2012–13 2013–14 2014–15 2015–16
6	Manny Hendrix	409	1982–83 1983–84 1984–85 1985–86
7	Jimmy Soto	392	1989–90 1990–91 1991–92 1992–93
8	Josh Grant	387	1988–89 1989–90 1990–91 1991–92 1992–93
9	Gale Gondrezick	382	1984–85 1985–86 1986–87 1987–88
10	Tim Drisdom	363	2002–03 2003–04 2004–05 2005–06

Season
Rk	Player	Assists	Season
1	Jeff Jonas	309	1976–77
2	Scott Martin	223	1980–81
	Jeff Jonas	223	1975–76
4	Jeff Jonas	204	1974–75
5	Andre Miller	201	1996–97
6	Deivon Smith	198	2023–24
7	Pace Mannion	192	1981–82
8	Andre Miller	186	1998–99
9	Delon Wright	178	2014–15
10	Andre Miller	177	1997–98

Single game
Rk	Player	Assists	Season	Opponent
1	Scott Jones	16	1973–74	BYU
	Jeff Jonas	16	5 times	
7	Scott Martin	15	1977–78	Weber State
	Jeff Jonas	15	1976–77	UNLV
9	Scott Martin	14	1979–80	BYU

== Steals ==
Career
Rk	Player	Steals	Seasons
1	Andre Miller	254	1995–96 1996–97 1997–98 1998–99
2	Josh Grant	191	1988–89 1989–90 1990–91 1991–92 1992–93
3	Brandon Taylor	164	2012–13 2013–14 2014–15 2015–16
4	Pace Mannion	159	1979–80 1980–81 1981–82 1982–83
5	Delon Wright	155	2013–14 2014–15
6	Kelvin Upshaw	135	1983–84 1984–85 1985–86
7	Shaun Green	134	2005–06 2006–07 2007–08 2008–09
	Mitch Smith	134	1985–86 1986–87 1987–88 1988–89
9	Gale Gondrezick	124	1984–85 1985–86 1986–87 1987–88
10	Jimmy Soto	122	1989–90 1990–91 1991–92 1992–93

Season
Rk	Player	Steals	Season
1	Andre Miller	84	1998–99
2	Delon Wright	82	2013–14
3	Delon Wright	73	2014–15
	Andre Miller	73	1997–98
5	Pace Mannion	63	1982–83
6	Brandon Taylor	61	2015–16
	Josh Grant	61	1990–91
8	Andre Miller	59	1996–97
9	Scott Martin	53	1980–81
10	Kelvin Upshaw	52	1983–84

Single game
Rk	Player	Steals	Season	Opponent
1	Brandon Jessie	8	1995–96	San Diego State
2	Delon Wright	7	2013–14	Colorado
	Delon Wright	7	2013–14	Evergreen State
	Will Clyburn	7	2010–11	Pepperdine
	Andre Miller	7	1998–99	Fresno State

== Blocks ==
Career
Rk	Player	Blocks	Seasons
1	Branden Carlson	241	2019–20 2020–21 2021–22 2022–23 2023–24
2	David Foster	219	2006–07 2009–10 2010–11
3	Luke Nevill	205	2005–06 2006–07 2007–08 2008–09
4	Mitch Smith	157	1985–86 1986–87 1987–88 1988–89
5	Jason Washburn	155	2009–10 2010–11 2011–12 2012–13
6	Keith Van Horn	126	1993–94 1994–95 1995–96 1996–97
7	Michael Doleac	124	1994–95 1995–96 1996–97 1997–98
8	Jakob Poeltl	119	2014–15 2015–16
9	Andrew Bogut	109	2003–04 2004–05
	Josh Grant	109	1988–89 1989–90 1990–91 1991–92 1992–93

Season
Rk	Player	Blocks	Season
1	David Foster	115	2009–10
2	David Foster	99	2010–11
3	Luke Nevill	92	2008–09
4	Andrew Bogut	65	2004–05
5	Jakob Poeltl	63	2014–15
	Branden Carlson	63	2022–23
7	Jakob Poeltl	56	2015–16
8	Mitch Smith	55	1988–89
9	Branden Carlson	54	2023–24
10	Luke Nevill	53	2007–08

Single game
Rk	Player	Blocks	Season	Opponent
1	David Foster	10	2009–10	Weber State
2	David Foster	9	2009–10	Colorado State
3	Branden Carlson	8	2019–20	Stanford
	Branden Carlson	8	2019–20	Stanford
	Jason Washburn	8	2011–12	Oregon State
6	Jakob Poeltl	7	2014–15	San Diego State
	David Foster	7	2010–11	Butler
	David Foster	7	2009–10	New Mexico
	David Foster	7	2009–10	LSU
	Luke Nevill	7	2008–09	Colorado State
	Larry Cain	7	1992–93	San Jose State
