= List of Utah Utes men's basketball seasons =

This is a list of seasons completed by the Utah Utes men's college basketball team.

== Seasons ==
Statistics overview
Season	Coach	Overall	Conference	Standing	Postseason
Erastus Milne (Independent) (1908–1909)
1908–09	Erastus Milne	3–8			
Robert Richardson (Independent) (1909–1910)
1909–10	Robert Richardson	17–3			
Fred Bennion (Independent) (1910–1914)
1910–11	Fred Bennion	5–2			
1911–12	Fred Bennion	5–2			
1912–13	Fred Bennion	21–3			
1913–14	Fred Bennion	13–2			
Nelson Norgren (Independent) (1914–1917)
1914–15	Nelson Norgren	12–4			
1915–16	Nelson Norgren	11–0			
1916–17	Nelson Norgren	3–3			
Thomas M. Fitzpatrick (Independent) (1917–1923)
1917–18	Thomas M. Fitzpatrick	5–4			
1918–19	Thomas M. Fitzpatrick	7–2			
1919–20	Thomas M. Fitzpatrick	5–1			
1920–21	Thomas M. Fitzpatrick	5–1			
1921–22	Thomas M. Fitzpatrick	8–2			
1922–23	Thomas M. Fitzpatrick	5–3			
Thomas M. Fitzpatrick (Mountain States Conference) (1923–1925)
1923–24	Thomas M. Fitzpatrick	2–6	2–6	3rd (Utah)	
1924–25	Thomas M. Fitzpatrick	5–11	3–5	4th (Western)	
Ike Armstrong (Mountain States Conference) (1925–1927)
1925–26	Ike Armstrong	4–8	4–8	4th (Western)	
1926–27	Ike Armstrong	5–10	4–8	3rd (Western)	
Vadal Peterson (Mountain States Conference) (1927–1943)
1927–28	Vadal Peterson	7–10	5–7	T–2nd (Western)	
1928–29	Vadal Peterson	5–12	3–9	4th (Western)	
1929–30	Vadal Peterson	15–12	4–8	4th (Western)	
1930–31	Vadal Peterson	21–6	8–4	1st (Western)	
1931–32	Vadal Peterson	14–9	8–4	T–1st (Western)	
1932–33	Vadal Peterson	13–8	9–3	T–1st (Western)	
1933–34	Vadal Peterson	14–9	7–5	T–2nd (Western)	
1934–35	Vadal Peterson	10–9	5–7	3rd (Western)	
1935–36	Vadal Peterson	7–15	4–8	4th (Western)	
1936–37	Vadal Peterson	17–7	7–5	T–1st (Western)	
1937–38	Vadal Peterson	20–4	10–2	T–1st	
1938–39	Vadal Peterson	13–7	7–5	T–3rd	
1939–40	Vadal Peterson	19–4	8–4	2nd	
1940–41	Vadal Peterson	14–7	9–3	2nd	
1941–42	Vadal Peterson	13–7	7–5	4th	
1942–43	Vadal Peterson	10–12	1–7	4th	
Vadal Peterson (Independent) (1943–1944)
1943–44	Vadal Peterson	22–4			NCAA Champion; NIT quarterfinal
Vadal Peterson (Mountain States Conference) (1944–1953)
1944–45	Vadal Peterson	17–4	8–0	1st	NCAA Elite Eight
1945–46	Vadal Peterson	12–8	8–4	3rd	
1946–47	Vadal Peterson	19–5	10–2	2nd	NIT Champion
1947–48	Vadal Peterson	11–9	6–4	T–2nd	
1948–49	Vadal Peterson	24–8	14–6	2nd	NIT quarterfinal
1949–50	Vadal Peterson	16–18	8–12	5th	
1950–51	Vadal Peterson	23–13	12–8	3rd	NCBT Third Place
1951–52	Vadal Peterson	19–9	8–6	4th	
1952–53	Vadal Peterson	10–14	5–9	T–5th	
Jack Gardner (Skyline Conference) (1953–1962)
1953–54	Jack Gardner	12–14	7–7	T–4th	
1954–55	Jack Gardner	24–4	13–1	1st	NCAA Sweet Sixteen
1955–56	Jack Gardner	22–6	12–2	1st	NCAA Elite Eight
1956–57	Jack Gardner	19–8	10–4	2nd	
1957–58	Jack Gardner	20–7	9–5	T–2nd	NIT first round
1958–59	Jack Gardner	21–7	13–1	1st	NCAA University Division Sweet Sixteen
1959–60	Jack Gardner	26–3	13–1	1st	NCAA University Division Sweet Sixteen
1960–61	Jack Gardner	23–8	12–2	T–1st	NCAA University Division Final Four
1961–62	Jack Gardner	23–3	13–1	1st	
Jack Gardner (Western Athletic Conference) (1962–1971)
1962–63	Jack Gardner	12–14	5–5	3rd	
1963–64	Jack Gardner	19–9	4–6	4th	
1964–65	Jack Gardner	17–9	3–7	6th	
1965–66	Jack Gardner	23–8	7–3	1st	NCAA University Division Final Four
1966–67	Jack Gardner	15–11	5–5	T–3rd	
1967–68	Jack Gardner	17–9	5–5	T–2nd	
1968–69	Jack Gardner	13–13	5–5	T–2nd	
1969–70	Jack Gardner	18–10	9–5	2nd	NIT quarterfinal
1970–71	Jack Gardner	15–11	9–5	2nd	
Bill Foster (Western Athletic Conference) (1971–1974)
1971–72	Bill Foster	13–12	5–9	6th	
1972–73	Bill Foster	8–19	4–10	T–7th	
1973–74	Bill Foster	22–8	9–5	T–2nd	NIT Runner-up
Jerry Pimm (Western Athletic Conference) (1974–1983)
1974–75	Jerry Pimm	17–9	7–5	4th	
1975–76	Jerry Pimm	19–8	9–5	T–2nd	
1976–77	Jerry Pimm	22–7	11–3	1st	NCAA Division I Sweet Sixteen
1977–78	Jerry Pimm	23–6	12–2	2nd	NCAA Division I Sweet Sixteen
1978–79	Jerry Pimm	20–10	9–3	2nd	NCAA Division I first round
1979–80	Jerry Pimm	18–10	10–4	T–2nd	
1980–81	Jerry Pimm	25–5	13–3	T–1st	NCAA Division I Sweet Sixteen
1981–82	Jerry Pimm	11–17	6–10	7th	
1982–83	Jerry Pimm	18–14	11–5	T–1st	NCAA Division I Sweet Sixteen
Lynn Archibald (Western Athletic Conference) (1983–1989)
1983–84	Lynn Archibald	11–19	4–12	8th	
1984–85	Lynn Archibald	15–16	8–8	6th	
1985–86	Lynn Archibald	20–10	12–4	T–1st	NCAA Division I first round
1986–87	Lynn Archibald	17–13	9–7	5th	NIT first round
1987–88	Lynn Archibald	19–11	11–5	2nd	NIT first round
1988–89	Lynn Archibald	16–17	6–10	6th	
Rick Majerus (Western Athletic Conference) (1989–1999)
1989–90	Rick Majerus; Joe Cravens	16–14^{[Note A]}	7–9	6th	
1990–91	Rick Majerus	30–4	15–1	1st	NCAA Division I Sweet Sixteen
1991–92	Rick Majerus	24–11	9–7	T–4th	NIT Third Place
1992–93	Rick Majerus	24–7	15–3	T–1st	NCAA Division I second round
1993–94	Rick Majerus	14–14	8–10	T–5th	
1994–95	Rick Majerus	28–6	15–3	1st	NCAA Division I second round
1995–96	Rick Majerus	27–7	15–3	1st	NCAA Division I Sweet Sixteen
1996–97	Rick Majerus	29–4	15–1	1st (Mountain)	NCAA Division I Elite Eight
1997–98	Rick Majerus	30–4	12–2	1st (Mountain)	NCAA Division I Runner-up
1998–99	Rick Majerus	28–5	14–0	1st (Pacific)	NCAA Division I second round
Rick Majerus (Mountain West Conference) (1999–2004)
1999–00	Rick Majerus	23–9	10–4	T–1st	NCAA Division I second round
2000–01	Rick Majerus; Dick Hunsaker	19–12^{[Note B]}	10–4	1st	NIT first round
2001–02	Rick Majerus	24–9	10–4	2nd	NCAA Division I first round
2002–03	Rick Majerus	25–8	11–3	T–1st	NCAA Division I second round
2003–04	Rick Majerus; Kerry Rupp	24–9^{[Note C]}	9–7^{[Note C]}	3rd	NCAA Division I first round
Ray Giacoletti (Mountain West Conference) (2004–2007)
2004–05	Ray Giacoletti	29–6	13–1	1st	NCAA Division I Sweet Sixteen
2005–06	Ray Giacoletti	14–15	6–10	6th	
2006–07	Ray Giacoletti	11–19	6–10	T–6th	
Jim Boylen (Mountain West Conference) (2007–2011)
2007–08	Jim Boylen	18–15	7–9	6th	CBI quarterfinal
2008–09	Jim Boylen	24–10	12–4	T–1st	NCAA Division I first round
2009–10	Jim Boylen	14–17	7–9	T–5th	
2010–11	Jim Boylen	13–18	6–10	7th	
Larry Krystkowiak (Pac-12 Conference) (2011–2021)
2011–12	Larry Krystkowiak	6–25	3–15	11th	
2012–13	Larry Krystkowiak	15–18	5–13	10th	
2013–14	Larry Krystkowiak	21–12	9–9	T–8th	NIT first round
2014–15	Larry Krystkowiak	26–9	13–5	T–2nd	NCAA Division I Sweet Sixteen
2015–16	Larry Krystkowiak	27–9	13–5	2nd	NCAA Division I second round
2016–17	Larry Krystkowiak	20–12	11–7	4th	NIT first round
2017–18	Larry Krystkowiak	23–12	11–7	T–3rd	NIT Runner-up
2018–19	Larry Krystkowiak	17–14	11–7	3rd	
2019–20	Larry Krystkowiak	16–15	7–11	T–8th	No postseason held
2020–21	Larry Krystkowiak	12–13	8–11	8th	
Craig Smith (Pac-12 Conference) (2021–2024)
2021–22	Craig Smith	11–20	4–16	11th	
2022–23	Craig Smith	17–15	10–10	7th	
2023–24	Craig Smith	22–15	9–11	T–6th	NIT Semifinals
Craig Smith (Big 12 Conference) (2024–present)
2024–25	Craig Smith; Josh Eilert^{[Note D]}	16–17	8–12	11th	CBC First Round
Alex Jensen (Big 12 Conference) (2024–present)
2025–26	Alex Jensen	10–22	2–16	16th	
Total:		1908–1112 (.632)			
National champion Postseason invitational champion Conference regular season champion Conference regular season and conference tournament champion Division regular season champion Division regular season and conference tournament champion Conference tournament champion

^A. Majerus coached six games (4–2) before undergoing heart surgery. Assistant Joe Cravens (12–12, 7–9) was the acting coach the rest of the season.
^B. Majerus coached first game (1–0) before taking a personal leave of absence. Assistant Dick Hunsaker finished the season.
^C. Majerus coached the first 20 games (15–5, 3–2) of the season before retiring from Utah. Assistant Kerry Rupp finished out the year (9–4, 6–3).
^D. Smith coached the first 27 games (15–12, 7–9) of the season before being fired from Utah. Interim Josh Eilert finished out the year (1–5, 1–3).
