= 1979–80 Utah Utes men's basketball team =

American college basketball season

1979–80 Utah Utes men's basketball
- Conference: Western Athletic Conference
- Record: 18–10 (10–4 WAC)
- Head coach: Jerry Pimm (6th season)
- Home arena: Special Events Center

1979–80 WAC men's basketball standings
	Conf.				Overall
Team	W		L	PCT	W		L	PCT
No. 12 BYU	13	–	1	.929	24	–	5	.828
UTEP	10	–	4	.714	20	–	8	.714
Utah	10	–	4	.714	18	–	10	.643
Wyoming	5	–	9	.357	18	–	10	.643
Colorado State	5	–	9	.357	10	–	17	.370
Hawaii	4	–	10	.286	13	–	14	.481
New Mexico	3	–	11	.214	7	–	21	.250
San Diego State	3	–	11	.214	6	–	21	.222
Rankings from AP Poll

The 1979–80 Utah Utes men's basketball team represented University of Utah in the 1979–80 college basketball season.

== Roster ==
1979–80 Utah Utes men's basketball team
Players
Coaches

Pos.	#	Name	Height	Weight	Year	Hometown
G	20	Pace Mannion	6 ft 7 in (2.01 m)	190 lb (86 kg)	Fr	Paradise, Nevada
F	23	Danny Vranes	6 ft 7 in (2.01 m)	205 lb (93 kg)	Jr	Salt Lake City, Utah
F/C	42	Tom Chambers	6 ft 10 in (2.08 m)	225 lb (102 kg)	Jr	Ogden, Utah

Head coach

- Jerry Pimm (Southern California)

Assistant coach(es)

Legend

- (C) Team captain
- (S) Suspended
- (I) Ineligible
- (W) Walk-on
- Injured
- Current redshirt

== Schedule ==
Date time, TV	Rank^{#}	Opponent^{#}	Result	Record	Site city, state
November 30*		Midwestern	L 69–70	1–0	Jon M. Huntsman Center; Salt Lake City, Utah
December 1*		at Weber State	L 79–91	1–1	Dee Events Center; Ogden, Utah
December 4*		Utah State	W 88–74	2–1	Jon M. Huntsman Center; Salt Lake City, Utah
December 7*		Cal State Fullerton	W 65–53	3–1	Jon M. Huntsman Center; Salt Lake City, Utah
December 8*		Connecticut	W 73–66	4–1	Jon M. Huntsman Center; Salt Lake City, Utah
December 12*		Nevada	W 71–68	5–1	Jon M. Huntsman Center; Salt Lake City, Utah
December 14*		vs. Oklahoma	L 68–69	5–2	War Memorial Gymnasium
December 15*		vs. Pacific	W 82–73	6–2	War Memorial Gymnasium
*Non-conference game. ^{#}Rankings from AP Poll. (#) Tournament seedings in parentheses.
