= 1978–79 Utah Utes men's basketball team =

American college basketball season

1978–79 Utah Utes men's basketball

NCAA tournament
- Conference: Western Athletic Conference
- Record: 20–10 (9–3 WAC)
- Head coach: Jerry Pimm (5th season)
- Home arena: Special Events Center

1978–79 WAC men's basketball standings
	Conf.				Overall
Team	W		L	PCT	W		L	PCT
BYU	10	–	2	.833	20	–	8	.714
Utah	9	–	3	.750	20	–	10	.667
New Mexico	8	–	4	.667	19	–	10	.655
Wyoming	5	–	7	.417	15	–	12	.556
San Diego State	4	–	8	.333	15	–	12	.556
UTEP	3	–	9	.250	11	–	15	.423
Colorado State	3	–	9	.250	11	–	16	.407
Rankings from AP Poll

The 1978–79 Utah Utes men's basketball team represented University of Utah in the 1978–79 college basketball season.

== Roster ==
1978–79 Utah Utes men's basketball team
Players
Coaches

Pos.	#	Name	Height	Weight	Year	Hometown
F	23	Danny Vranes	6 ft 7 in (2.01 m)	205 lb (93 kg)	So	Salt Lake City, Utah
F/C	42	Tom Chambers	6 ft 10 in (2.08 m)	225 lb (102 kg)	So	Ogden, Utah

Head coach

- Jerry Pimm (Southern California)

Assistant coach(es)

Legend

- (C) Team captain
- (S) Suspended
- (I) Ineligible
- (W) Walk-on
- Injured
- Current redshirt

== Schedule and results ==
Date time, TV	Rank^{#}	Opponent^{#}	Result	Record	Site city, state
Regular season
Nov 25, 1978*		Boise State	W 75–56	1–0	Jon M. Huntsman Center; Salt Lake City, Utah
Mar 3, 1979		at San Diego State	W 100–87	20–9 (9–3)	San Diego Sports Arena; San Diego, California
NCAA tournament
Mar 9, 1979*		vs. Pepperdine	L 88–92 ^{OT}	20–10	Pauley Pavilion; Los Angeles, California
*Non-conference game. ^{#}Rankings from AP Poll. (#) Tournament seedings in parentheses. W=West.
