= UC Santa Barbara Events Center =

University arena in California, U.S.A

Events Center
- UC Santa Barbara Events Center; The Thunderdome; ECen

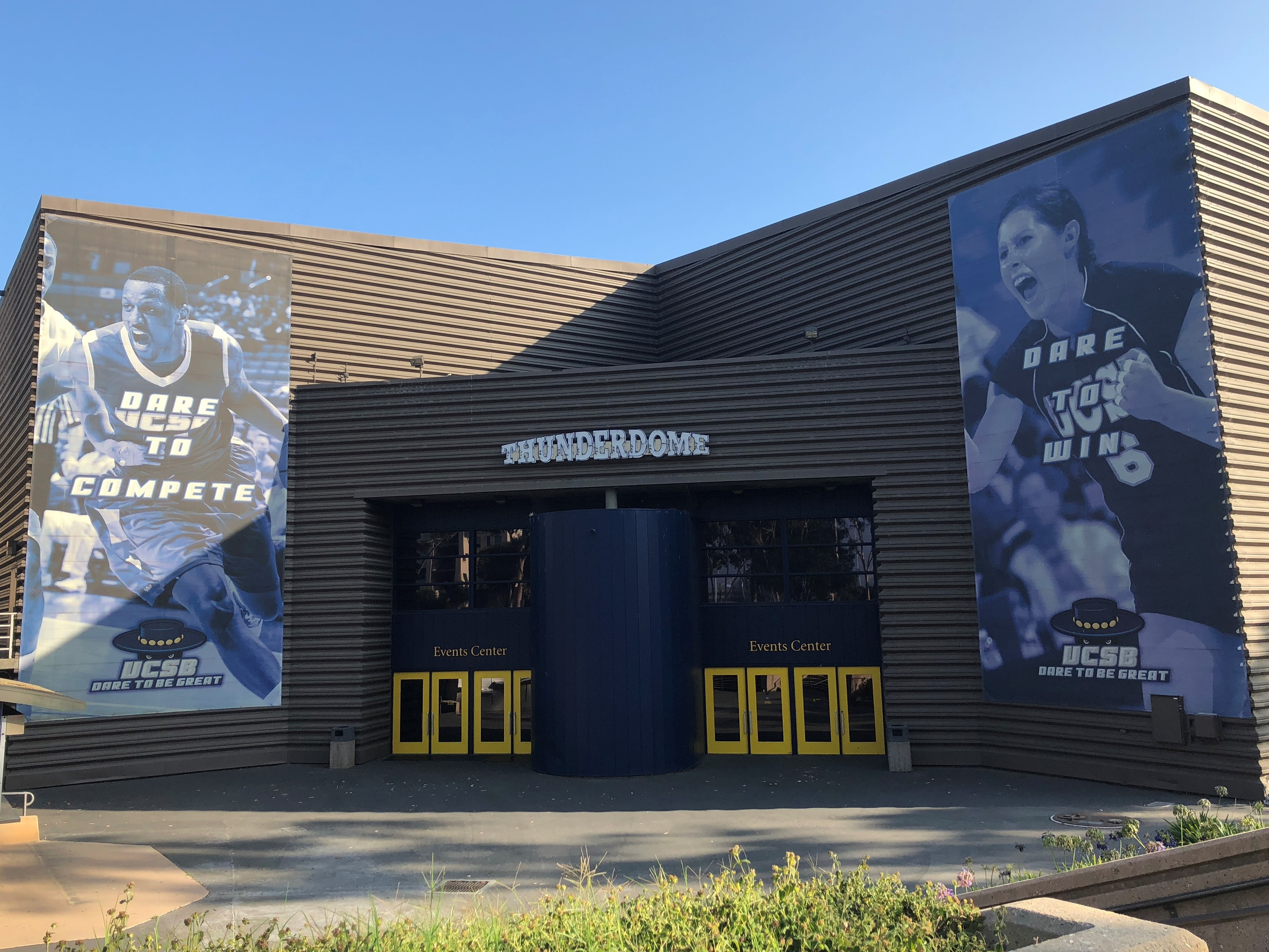
- Entrance to the Thunderdome as seen in 2018
- Interactive map of Events Center
- Full name: UC Santa Barbara Events Center
- Former names: Campus Events Center
- Location: Santa Barbara, California
- Coordinates: 34°24′49.65″N 119°51′4.13″W
- Owner: UCSB
- Capacity: 5,000 (for basketball)
- Executive suites: None
- Scoreboard: Yes
- Record attendance: 6,512 on December 18, 1991 for Men's Basketball vs. Ohio State

Construction
- Opened: 1979; 47 years ago

Tenants
- UC Santa Barbara Gauchos teams: men's and women's basketball; volleyball

Website
- eventscenter.ucsb.edu

UC Santa Barbara Events Center, previously known as the Campus Events Center, also known as The Thunderdome, is a 5,000-seat, indoor multi-purpose arena on the campus of the University of California, Santa Barbara in Santa Barbara, California. The arena serves as home venue to UC Santa Barbara Gauchos' men's and women's basketball, and volleyball teams.

== History ==
The Thunderdome was built in 1979, originally under the name of Campus Events Center. Along with Harder Stadium, it has since become one of the most patronized venues at UC Santa Barbara. After a naming contest and vote among students and faculty (which included some tongue-in-cheek nominations such as "Yankee Stadium", the Jerry Brown Arena, and the Corrugated Fortress), it was eventually given the generic name "Campus Events Center". Eventually, the name was unofficially shortened to the "ECen" (much like UCSB's University Center being called the "UCen").

For basketball, the arena seats 5,000. One of the recent upgrades to the Thunderdome has been the replacement of bleachers with chairback seating which significantly improved the fan experience but did reduce capacity by about 600 seats. The floor of the Thunderdome was named by Bleacher Report as the 11th best court design in college basketball.

=== Transformation into The Thunderdome ===
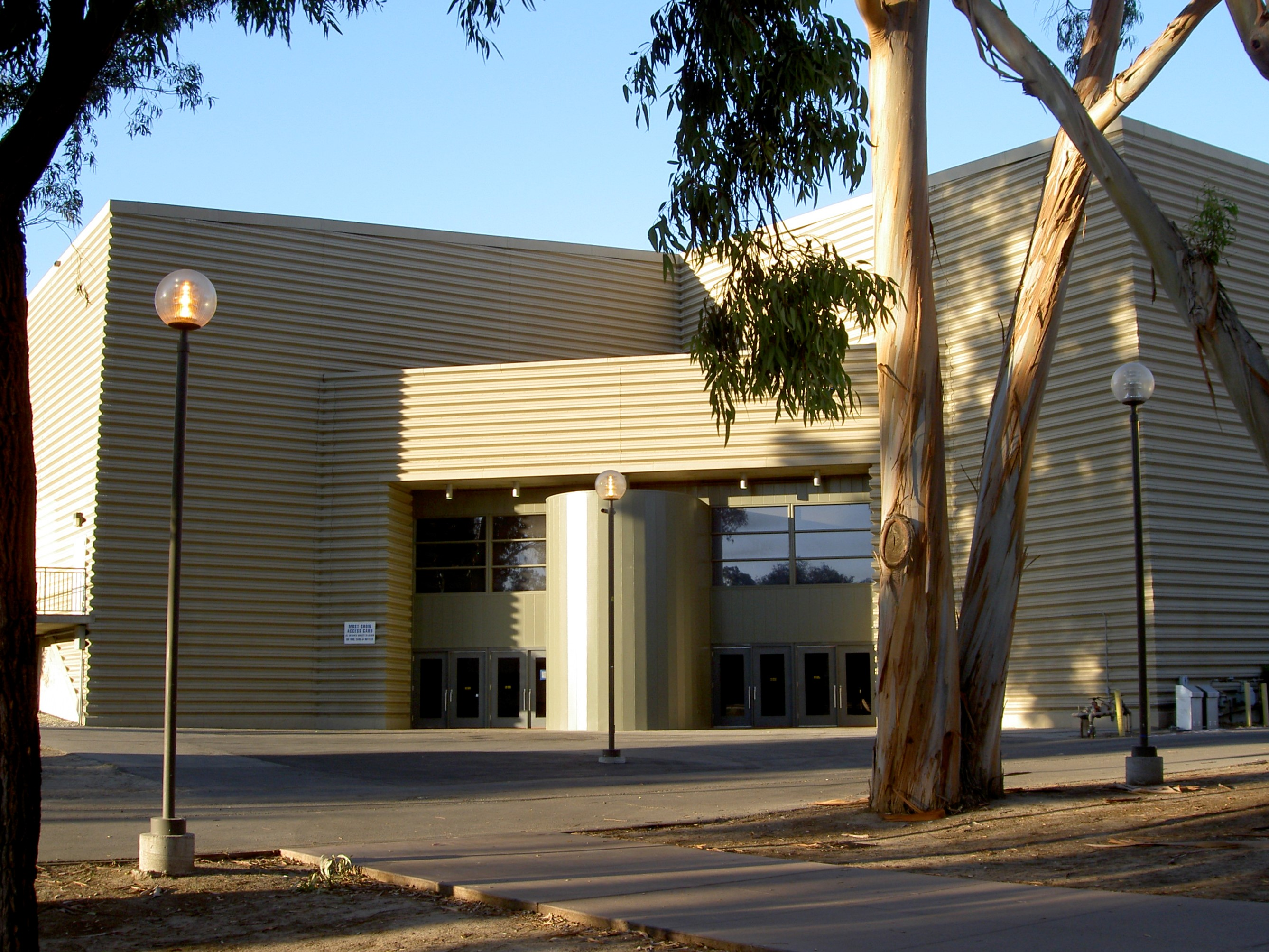
The "back" of the Thunderdome, from the point of view of one of the main student walkways

At first, crowds were small, but with the hiring of Jerry Pimm in 1983, the UC Santa Barbara Gauchos men's basketball program began to experience greater success. As crowds began to increase (often exceeding the stated capacity), the Events Center gained a reputation as one of the loudest and most hostile venues in college basketball, creating significant problems for opposing teams.

After UCSB (led by future Laker Brian Shaw) upset Jim Valvano's North Carolina State Wolfpack team by double digits in 1987 before a sellout crowd, the Events Center acquired the unofficial nickname "The Thunderdome". Credit has been given to the athletic director at that time, Stan Morrison, for having coined the nickname. Also many believe it was further reinforced by Valvano himself when he said in a postgame interview, "It was louder than thunder in there tonight."

=== The Tortilla Technical ===
During the 1980s, students threw toilet paper onto the court after the first Gaucho basket. After the school cracked down on this practice around 1990, students started a new tradition of tossing tortillas onto the court like frisbees after the first UCSB basket. The team would then be assessed a technical foul for delay of game while the tortillas were cleaned up. This tradition became known as "The Tortilla Technical."

During an early 1990s game, one of ESPN's professional video cameras was ruined when tortilla fragments got into the mechanism. While UCSB paid for a replacement camera, ESPN was skittish about returning to the Thunderdome. Despite continued pleading from the players and coaches to stop the practice, the tradition continued unabated. When ESPN finally returned to the Thunderdome for a 1997 game against Pacific, the game was interrupted by three "Tortilla Technicals," including one incident late in the game where a tortilla nearly hit coach Jerry Pimm in the face. Following this incident, UCSB officials began searching students for tortillas as they entered the arena. Apart from a few sporadic instances of tortilla-tossing, the novelty has worn off.

While the tortillas have stopped flying at The Thunderdome, raucous students have brought the practice to Harder Stadium, home of the 2006 NCAA champion UC Santa Barbara Gauchos men's soccer team; no such penalties are enforced there.

== Tenants ==
=== UC Santa Barbara Gauchos athletics ===
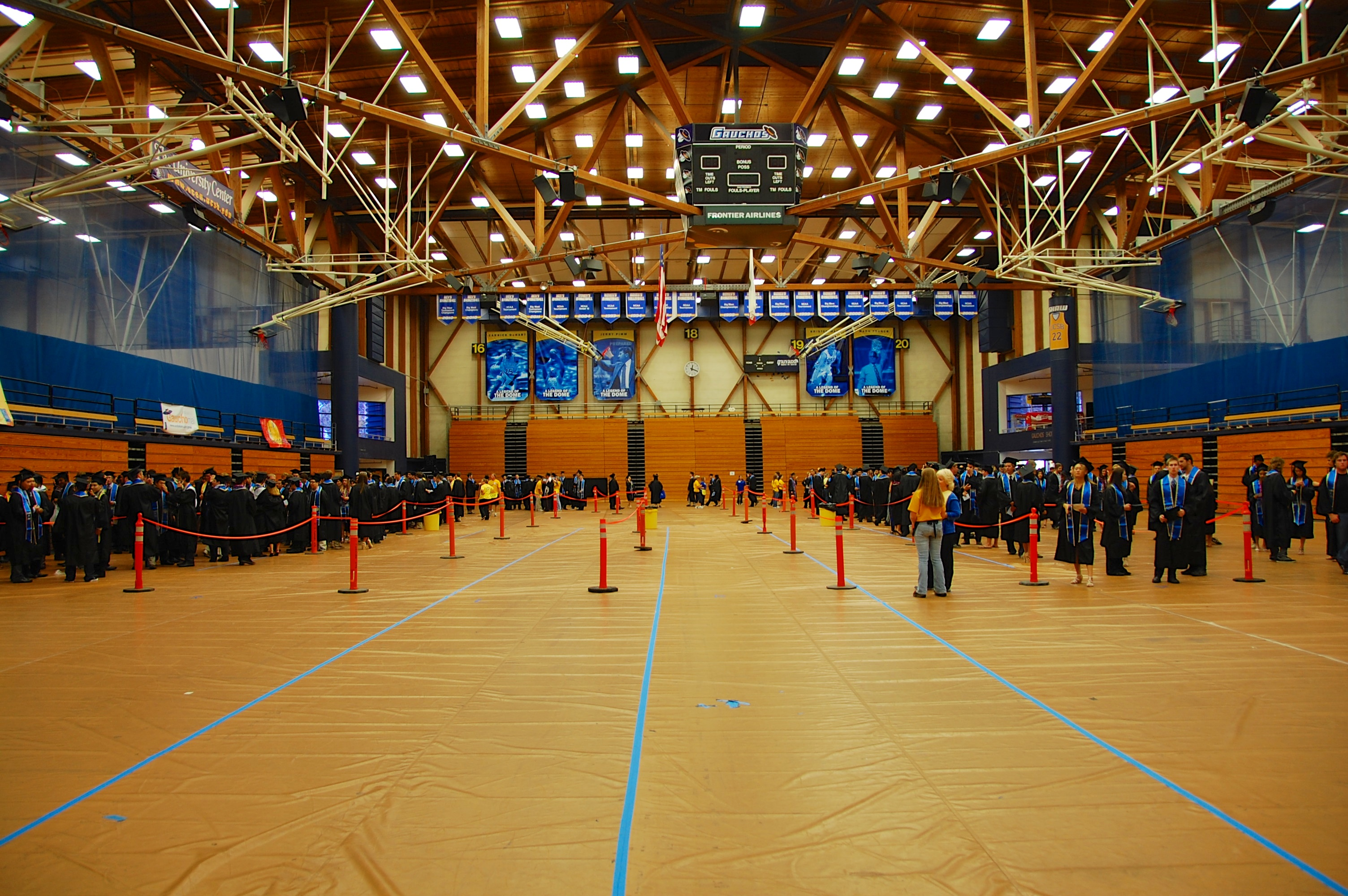
Thunderdome hosting students about to graduate in June 2012.

The Thunderdome is the home to teams of the UC Santa Barbara Gauchos athletic program. Currently, the UC Santa Barbara Gauchos men's basketball and UC Santa Barbara Gauchos women's basketball teams, as well as the UC Santa Barbara Gauchos women's volleyball team all call The Thunderdome home. In 2002, 2,794 fans attended a women's volleyball match between UCSB and the USC Trojans in which the 9th ranked Gauchos upset USC 3 games to 1.

=== Other events ===
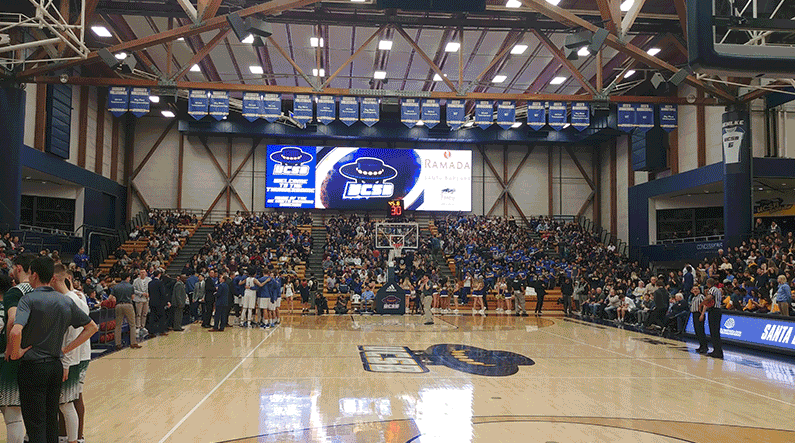
New 4K Video Board installed in the Thunderdome.

The facility also hosted the first and second-round games of the 2004 NCAA Division I women's basketball tournament. In addition to sporting events, The Thunderdome has seen many concerts, boxing matches, and performances.

Dave Chappelle performed comedy on June 2, 2004, while The Killers played at The Thunderdome on April 6, 2007, and the Harlem Globetrotters played an exhibition game on February 15, 2007.

The center has hosted summer basketball camps by Michael Jordan and Kobe Bryant.

== See also ==
- List of NCAA Division I basketball arenas
