= Josh Grant (basketball) =

American basketball player

Personal information
- Born: August 7, 1967 (age 59) Salt Lake City, Utah, U.S.
- Listed height: 6 ft 9 in (2.06 m)
- Listed weight: 223 lb (101 kg)

Career information
- High school: East (Salt Lake City, Utah)
- College: Utah (1988–1993)
- NBA draft: 1993: 2nd round, 43rd overall pick
- Drafted by: Denver Nuggets
- Playing career: 1993–2002
- Position: Power forward
- Number: 5, 11

Career history
- 1993–1994: Golden State Warriors
- 1994–1995: Valencia
- 1995–1996: Baloncesto León
- 1996–1998: Le Mans Sarthe
- 1998–1999: Pau-Orthez
- 1999–2000: Olympiacos
- 2000–2001: Aris Thessaloniki
- 2001: Cholet Basket
- 2001–2002: Roseto Sharks

Career highlights
- Third-team All-American – UPI (1993); 2× WAC Player of the Year (1991, 1993); 2× First-team All-WAC (1991, 1993); Second-team All-WAC (1990)

Career NBA statistics
- Points: 157
- Assists: 24
- Rebounds: 89
- Stats at NBA.com
- Stats at Basketball Reference
Medals
Men's basketball
Representing United States
Summer Universiade
Gold medal – first place	1991 Sheffield	National team

Joshua David Grant (born August 7, 1967) is an American former professional basketball player. The 6'9" (2.06 m), 223 pound (101 kg) power forward graduated from East High School in Salt Lake City, Utah in 1986 and attended the University of Utah, where he was an important player and still holds multiple basketball records. Among other honors, Grant was named to Utah's All-Century Men's Basketball Team on February 12, 2008 and was inducted into the University's Crimson Club Hall of Fame on April 8, 2008.

Grant was selected with the sixteenth pick of the second round of the 1993 NBA draft (43rd pick overall) by the Denver Nuggets and was traded to the Golden State Warriors on a draft night trade. Grant played for the Warriors during the 1993–1994 season, and then played abroad for several years.

== College career ==
Grant played for the University of Utah Utes from 1988–1993 (he was forced to take a medical red-shirt year because of a knee injury during the 1991–92 season).

Grant played under coach Lynn Archibald for one season, and then under Rick Majerus for the rest of his college career. The period during which Grant played under Majerus marked the beginning of a highly successful period for the Utes under Majerus throughout the 1990s, which culminated with the Utes' appearance in the NCAA championship game in 1998. The Utes won WAC regular season championships in 1991 and 1993, and the 1991 team went to the Sweet Sixteen of the NCAA Tournament, eventually being eliminated by Jerry Tarkanian's defending champion UNLV Runnin' Rebels to finish 30–4 for the season. Grant was the captain of the Utah team for three years (1991, 1992, 1993).

=== Honors ===
Grant received many honors for his collegiate career at Utah, where he was a four-year letter earner (1989, 1990, 1991, 1993). He was first-team all-WAC twice (1991, 1993) and second team all-WAC once (1990). Grant was named WAC player of the year twice (1991, 1993), and during those same two years, was also named to the WAC All-Tournament Team, and the Utes won WAC regular-season championships.

In 2008, Grant was honored by the University of Utah as part of its men's basketball program's centennial celebration when he was named to the University of Utah Men's Basketball "All Century Team" on February 12, 2008. Grant was also honored on April 8, 2008, when he was inducted to the University of Utah's Crimson Club Hall of Fame in 2008.

Grant also participated in several events that are among some of the most memorable in Utah men's basketball history. He dunked over 7'6" center Sean Bradley of arch-rival BYU on February 16, 1991, which was voted as the 41st greatest moment in Utah basketball history. Other events of the 100 Greatest Moments in Utah's Basketball History that Grant participated in include:

- 33. March 17, 1991 – Utah 85 Michigan State 84 to go to Sweet 16. The game went to double overtime, and Grant had 29 points for the Utes.
- 42. March 2, 1991 – Utah beats BYU 72–71 OT (30–4 season).
- 72. Feb 16, 1991 – Utah wins WAC with an 81–74 victory over BYU.
- 98. Feb 27, 1993 – Largest crowd ever recorded in the Huntsman Center (15,755).

=== Records ===
Grant holds multiple records in many categories for Utah, including several all-time records, such as:

- Third highest scorer all-time with 2000 total points.
- Third in total rebounds with 1066.
- Most total offensive rebounds with 337.
- Second in total defensive rebounds with 839.
- Fourth in total field goals made with 727.
- Third in total three-point field goals made with 153.
- Second in all-time steals with 191.
- Seventh in all-time assists with 387.
- Fourth in blocked shots with 109.
- Third in total games played with 131.

Grant also holds many Utah records for individual games or seasons, as well as several WAC records, which are not listed here.

== Professional career ==
Josh Grant was drafted as the 16th pick of the second round in the 1993 NBA draft (43rd overall) by the Denver Nuggets and was traded to the Golden State Warriors in a draft night trade with a 1994 second-round draft pick (eventually used to select Anthony Miller of Michigan) for Darnell Mee. Grant played for the Warriors during the 1993–1994 season before playing abroad for several years.

Grant was waived after one season.

Grant played professionally in Europe for nine more years, playing on teams in Spain, France, Greece and Italy.

== Personal ==
Grant graduated from East High School in Salt Lake City in 1986, where he was an all-state player twice, and was named the Gatorade Player of the Year in Utah as a senior, after leading his team to a third-place finish in the state tournament. His older brother Greg was also a standout basketball player, earning PCAA co-Player of the Year honors at Utah State. His other brother Nate also played at Utah State.

Grant also served a two-year mission for the Church of Jesus Christ of Latter-day Saints in London from 1986 to 1988.

After his basketball career, Grant earned a master's degree in teaching. He was a history teacher and head boys' basketball coach at Lake Forrest High School and Niles West High School in the Chicago, Illinois area.

Grant currently works as a regional development officer for the University of Utah, as part of the University's outreach program to alumni and friends. As part of this job, he travels around the country meeting alums and working to establish new relationships and strengthen ties with alums and friends on behalf of the university.

== Career statistics ==
=== NBA ===
Legend
GP	Games played	GS	Games started	MPG	Minutes per game
FG%	Field goal percentage	3P%	3-point field goal percentage	FT%	Free throw percentage
RPG	Rebounds per game	APG	Assists per game	SPG	Steals per game
BPG	Blocks per game	PPG	Points per game	**Bold**	Career high

==== Regular season ====
Year	Team	GP	GS	MPG	FG%	3P%	FT%	RPG	APG	SPG	BPG	PPG
1993–94	Golden State	53	0	7.2	.404	.279	.759	1.7	0.5	0.3	0.2	3.0

==== Playoffs ====
Year	Team	GP	GS	MPG	FG%	3P%	FT%	RPG	APG	SPG	BPG	PPG
1993–94	Golden State	1	0	1.0	–	–	–	.0	.0	.0	.0	.0

== See also ==
- List of NCAA Division I men's basketball players with 2000 points and 1000 rebounds
