= Jerry Pimm =

American basketball coach

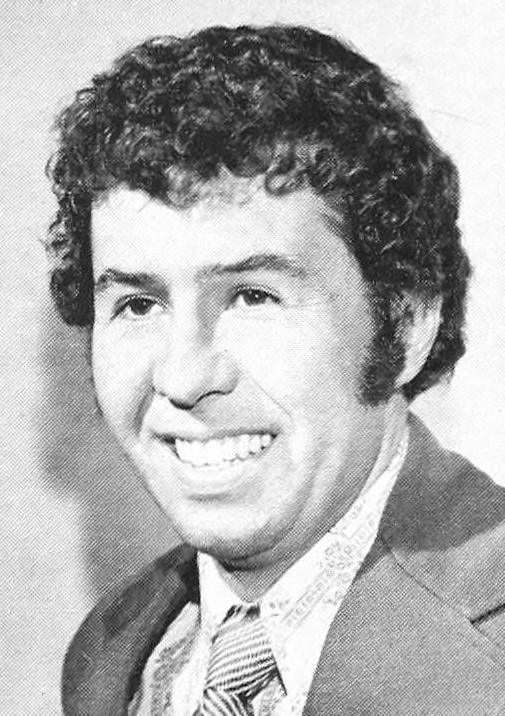
- Pimm circa 1974

Playing career
- 1957–1960: USC
- Position: Guard

Coaching career (HC unless noted)
- 1960–1961: USC (assistant)
- 1961–1974: Utah (assistant)
- 1974–1983: Utah
- 1983–1998: UC Santa Barbara

Head coaching record
- Overall: 395–288
- Tournaments: 6–7 (NCAA Division I); 0–3 (NIT)

Accomplishments and honors

Championships
- 3 WAC regular season (1977, 1981, 1983)

Awards
- Second-team All-AAWU (1960)

Jerry Pimm is an American former basketball coach. He served as the head men's basketball coach at the University of Utah from 1974 to 1983 and the University of California, Santa Barbara from 1983 to 1998, compiling career college basketball coaching record of 395–288.

== Playing career ==
Playing for Montebello High School, Pimm earned the Helms Athletic Foundation's Central Section co-high school player of the year in 1956. He played at Fullerton Junior College in 1956-1958. He then played guard at the University of Southern California, where he earned second-team All-Athletic Association of Western Universities and All-Coast Team honors in 1960.

== Coaching career ==
Pimm replaced former Utah coach Bill Foster, who had accepted the same position with the Duke University Blue Devils, in 1974 after serving 13 years as an assistant coach under Jack Gardner and Foster. As coach of the Utes, Pimm led Utah to a 173-86 (.668) record, including four Sweet 16 appearances in the NCAA tournament. The Utes also won 3 Western Athletic Conference basketball titles and only had one losing season during his stay. In 1981, the Utes lost to eventual champion North Carolina, led by Sam Perkins, Al Wood, and James Worthy. The Utes were led by Danny Vranes, Tom Chambers and Karl Bankowski. In the 1983 NCAA Men's basketball tournament, Pimm's Utes were seeded 10th in the west regional, but led by Peter Williams and Pace Mannion, Utah upset 7th seed Illinois and 2nd seed UCLA before losing to eventual champion North Carolina State. After the season, Pimm decided to leave the University of Utah for the University of California, Santa Barbara.

Prior to Pimm's career at UCSB, the Gauchos program had suffered through seven straight losing seasons. After a shaky start, which saw three more losing seasons, the Gauchos turned it around in the 1986-87 season, where they finished with a 16-13 record. The next season would be Pimm's best at UCSB. Led by conference player of the year Brian Shaw, the Gauchos went 22-8, including an 18-point win over Jim Valvano's North Carolina State team (with Chucky Brown, Charles Shackleford, and Vinny Del Negro), and two wins over Jerry Tarkanian's UNLV Runnin' Rebels (the second win coming when UNLV was ranked #2). UCSB earned its first-ever NCAA Tournament berth, but they lost to the University of Maryland in the first round, 92-82.

In 1990, UCSB once again made the NCAA Tournament (propelled by a 78-70 win over top-ranked and eventual national champion UNLV), this time beating the University of Houston 70-66 in the first round before falling to #1 seed Michigan State 62-58 in the 2nd round. Under Pimm, UCSB also played in three National Invitation Tournaments. In the mid-late 90s, UCSB had suffered through five straight losing seasons, and Pimm resigned, although he later took a job with the athletic department. Pimm went 217-187 (.537) in 16 seasons with the Gauchos. He holds an all-time record of 390-273 (.588) in 25 years as a head coach.

Pimm assisted Lute Olson with the US national team at the 1986 Goodwill Games and the 1986 FIBA World Championship, winning the gold medal both times.

Jamie Dixon and Ben Howland both were assistant coaches for Pimm while at UCSB.

== Head coaching record ==
Record table
Season	Team	Overall	Conference	Standing	Postseason
Utah Utes (Western Athletic Conference) (1974–1983)
1974–75	Utah	17–9	7–5	4th	
1975–76	Utah	19–8	9–5	T–2nd	
1976–77	Utah	22–7	11–3	1st	NCAA Division I Sweet 16
1977–78	Utah	23–6	12–2	2nd	NCAA Division I Sweet 16
1978–79	Utah	20–10	9–3	2nd	NCAA Division I First Round
1979–80	Utah	18–10	10–4	T–2nd	
1980–81	Utah	25–5	13–3	T–1st	NCAA Division I Sweet 16
1981–82	Utah	11–17	6–10	7th	
1982–83	Utah	18–14	11–5	T–1st	NCAA Division I Sweet 16
Utah:		173–86	88–40		
UC Santa Barbara Gauchos (Pacific Coast Athletic Association / Big West Conference) (1983–1998)
1983–84	UC Santa Barbara	10–17	5–13	9th	
1984–85	UC Santa Barbara	12–16	8–10	T–6th	
1985–86	UC Santa Barbara	12–15	7–11	9th	
1986–87	UC Santa Barbara	16–13	10–8	T–2nd	
1987–88	UC Santa Barbara	22–8	13–5	T–2nd	NCAA Division I First Round
1988–89	UC Santa Barbara	21–9	11–7	3rd	NIT First Round
1989–90	UC Santa Barbara	21–9	13–5	T–2nd	NCAA Division I Second Round
1990–91	UC Santa Barbara	14–15	8–10	T–4th	
1991–92	UC Santa Barbara	20–9	13–5	2nd	NIT First Round
1992–93	UC Santa Barbara	18–11	10–8	T–5th	NIT First Round
1993–94	UC Santa Barbara	13–17	9–9	7th	
1994–95	UC Santa Barbara	13–14	8–10	6th	
1995–96	UC Santa Barbara	11–15	8–10	T–7th	
1996–97	UC Santa Barbara	12–15	7–9	3rd (Western)	
1997–98	UC Santa Barbara	7–19	4–12	6th (Western)	
UC Santa Barbara:		222–202	134–132		
Total:		395–288			
National champion Postseason invitational champion Conference regular season champion Conference regular season and conference tournament champion Division regular season champion Division regular season and conference tournament champion Conference tournament champion
