= 1980–81 Utah Utes men's basketball team =

American college basketball season

1980–81 Utah Utes men's basketball

WAC regular season Champions

NCAA tournament, Sweet Sixteen
- Conference: Western Athletic Conference

Ranking
- Coaches: No. 10
- AP: No. 14
- Record: 25–5 (13–3 WAC)
- Head coach: Jerry Pimm (7th season)
- Home arena: Special Events Center

1980–81 WAC men's basketball standings
	Conf.				Overall
Team	W		L	PCT	W		L	PCT
No. 14 Utah	13	–	3	.813	25	–	5	.833
No. 17 Wyoming	13	–	3	.813	24	–	6	.800
No. 16 BYU	12	–	4	.750	25	–	7	.781
UTEP	9	–	7	.563	18	–	12	.600
San Diego State	8	–	8	.500	15	–	12	.556
Hawaii	7	–	9	.438	14	–	13	.519
New Mexico	6	–	10	.375	11	–	15	.423
Air Force	3	–	13	.188	9	–	18	.333
Colorado State	1	–	15	.063	3	–	24	.111
Rankings from AP Poll

The 1980–81 Utah Utes men's basketball team represented the University of Utah in the 1980-81 season. Head coach Jerry Pimm, and Senior stars Tom Chambers and Danny Vranes would lead the Utes to a Western Athletic Conference championship and the Sweet Sixteen of the NCAA tournament. In the best season the Utes would have under Pimm, the team finished with an overall record of 25–5 (13–3 WAC). Vranes and Chambers were both selected in the top 8 picks of the NBA Draft. Chambers, drafted by the San Diego (Now Los Angeles) Clippers, would go on to play for several NBA teams in his career, most notably the Phoenix Suns, with whom he would make an appearance in the 1993 NBA Finals; and the Utah Jazz.

== Roster ==
1980–81 Utah Utes men's basketball team
Players
Coaches

Pos.	#	Name	Height	Weight	Year	Hometown
G	20	Pace Mannion	6 ft 7 in (2.01 m)	190 lb (86 kg)	So	Paradise, Nevada
F	23	Danny Vranes	6 ft 7 in (2.01 m)	205 lb (93 kg)	Sr	Salt Lake City, Utah
F/C	42	Tom Chambers	6 ft 10 in (2.08 m)	225 lb (102 kg)	Sr	Ogden, Utah

Head coach

- Jerry Pimm (USC)

Assistant coach(es)

Legend

- (C) Team captain
- (S) Suspended
- (I) Ineligible
- (W) Walk-on
- Injured
- Current redshirt

== Schedule and results ==
Date time, TV	Rank^{#}	Opponent^{#}	Result	Record	Site city, state
Regular season
Dec 6, 1980*		Weber State	W 76–61	1–0	Jon M. Huntsman Center; Salt Lake City, Utah
Dec 9, 1980*		at Utah State	W 83–81	2–0	Dee Glen Smith Spectrum; Logan, Utah
Dec 12, 1980*		Oklahoma State	W 89–73	3–0	Jon M. Huntsman Center; Salt Lake City, Utah
Dec 13, 1980*		Nebraska	W 57–55	4–0	Jon M. Huntsman Center; Salt Lake City, Utah
Dec 16, 1980*		Utah State	W 99–74	5–0	Jon M. Huntsman Center; Salt Lake City, Utah
Dec 20, 1980*		at No. 20 Louisville	W 78–59	6–0	Freedom Hall; Louisville, Kentucky
Dec 26, 1980*	No. 19	vs. Drake; Far West Classic	L 68–69	6–1	Memorial Coliseum; Portland, Oregon
Dec 27, 1980*	No. 19	vs. Cal State Fullerton; Far West Classic	W 76–70	7–1	Memorial Coliseum; Portland, Oregon
Dec 28, 1980*	No. 19	vs. Northwestern; Far West Classic	W 73–63	8–1	Memorial Coliseum; Portland, Oregon
Jan 2, 1981*	No. 20	at UNLV	W 76–75	9–1	Las Vegas Convention Center; Las Vegas, Nevada
Jan 3, 1981	No. 20	at Air Force	W 74–60	10–1 (1–0)	Clune Arena; Colorado Springs, Colorado
Jan 8, 1981	No. 18	Hawaii	W 100–87	11–1 (2–0)	Jon M. Huntsman Center; Salt Lake City, Utah
Jan 10, 1981	No. 18	San Diego State	W 97–74	12–1 (3–0)	Jon M. Huntsman Center; Salt Lake City, Utah
Jan 15, 1981	No. 16	at UTEP	W 69–64	13–1 (4–0)	Special Events Center; El Paso, Texas
Jan 17, 1981	No. 16	at New Mexico	W 82–76	14–1 (5–0)	The Pit; Albuquerque, New Mexico
Jan 23, 1981	No. 14	Wyoming	W 55–53	15–1 (6–0)	Jon M. Huntsman Center; Salt Lake City, Utah
Jan 24, 1981	No. 14	Colorado State	W 86–56	16–1 (7–0)	Jon M. Huntsman Center; Salt Lake City, Utah
Jan 31, 1981	No. 9	No. 15 BYU	W 60–56	17–1 (8–0)	Jon M. Huntsman Center; Salt Lake City, Utah
Feb 6, 1981	No. 7	Air Force	W 48–46	18–1 (9–0)	Jon M. Huntsman Center; Salt Lake City, Utah
Feb 7, 1981	No. 7	UNLV	W 95–83	20–1	Jon M. Huntsman Center; Salt Lake City, Utah
Feb 12, 1981	No. 6	at San Diego State	W 62–53	21–1 (10–0)	San Diego Sports Arena; San Diego, California
Feb 14, 1981	No. 6	at Hawaii	L 74–83	21–2 (10–1)	Neal S. Blaisdell Center; Honolulu, Hawaii
Feb 19, 1981	No. 9	New Mexico	W 90–73	22–2 (11–1)	Jon M. Huntsman Center; Salt Lake City, Utah
Feb 21, 1981	No. 9	UTEP	W 69–59	23–2 (12–1)	Jon M. Huntsman Center; Salt Lake City, Utah
Feb 26, 1981	No. 7	at Colorado State	W 73–50	24–2 (13–1)	Moby Arena; Fort Collins, Colorado
Feb 28, 1981	No. 7	at Wyoming	L 50–53	24–3 (13–2)	War Memorial Fieldhouse; Laramie, Wyoming
Mar 7, 1981	No. 9	at No. 18 BYU	L 76–95	24–4 (13–3)	Marriott Center; Provo, Utah
NCAA tournament
Mar 15, 1981*	(3 W) No. 14	vs. (11 W) Northeastern; Second Round	W 94–69	25–4	Special Events Center; El Paso, Texas
Mar 19, 1981*	(3 W) No. 14	vs. (2 W) No. 6 North Carolina; Regional semifinal – Sweet Sixteen	L 56–61	25–5	Jon M. Huntsman Center; Salt Lake City, Utah
*Non-conference game. ^{#}Rankings from AP Poll. (#) Tournament seedings in parentheses. W=West.

=== NCAA tournament ===
3/15/1981, second round Vs. Northeastern @ Don Haskins Center, El Paso, TX - W, 94–69
3/19/1981, Sweet Sixteen Vs. North Carolina @ Special Events Center, Salt Lake City, UT - L, 56–61

== NBA draft ==
Round	Pick	Player	NBA Club
1	5	Danny Vranes	Seattle SuperSonics
1	8	Tom Chambers	San Diego Clippers
