= 1982–83 Utah Utes men's basketball team =

American college basketball season

1982–83 Utah Utes men's basketball

WAC regular season Champions

NCAA tournament, Sweet Sixteen
- Conference: Western Athletic Conference
- Record: 18–14 (11–5 WAC)
- Head coach: Jerry Pimm (9th season)
- Home arena: Special Events Center

1982–83 WAC men's basketball standings
	Conf.				Overall
Team	W		L	PCT	W		L	PCT
UTEP	11	–	5	.688	19	–	10	.655
Utah	11	–	5	.688	18	–	14	.563
BYU	11	–	5	.688	15	–	14	.517
Hawaii	9	–	7	.563	17	–	11	.607
San Diego State	8	–	8	.500	18	–	10	.643
Wyoming	8	–	8	.500	16	–	13	.552
New Mexico	6	–	10	.375	14	–	15	.483
Colorado State	6	–	10	.375	11	–	17	.393
Air Force	2	–	14	.125	10	–	17	.370
Rankings from AP Poll

The 1982–83 Utah Utes men's basketball team represented the University of Utah as a member of the Western Athletic Conference during the 1982-83 season. Head coach Jerry Pimm would lead the Utes to a Western Athletic Conference championship and the Sweet Sixteen of the NCAA tournament.

== Roster ==
1982–83 Utah Utes men's basketball team
Players	Coaches
Pos. / # / Name / Height / Weight / Year / Hometown; G / 20 / Pace Mannion / 6 ft 7 in (2.01 m) / 190 lb (86 kg) / Sr / Paradise, Nevada	Head coach: Jerry Pimm (USC); Assistant coach(es) Legend: (C) Team captain; (S) Suspended; (I) Ineligible; (W) Walk-on; Injured; Current redshirt

== Schedule and results ==
Date time, TV	Rank^{#}	Opponent^{#}	Result	Record	Site city, state
Regular season
Nov 26, 1982*		No. 10 Oregon State	W 68–62	1–0	Jon M. Huntsman Center; Salt Lake City, Utah
NCAA Tournament
Mar 17, 1983*	(10 W)	vs. (7 W) Illinois; First round	W 52–49	17–13	BSU Pavilion; Boise, Idaho
Mar 19, 1983*	(10 W)	vs. (2 W) No. 7 UCLA; Second Round	W 67–61	18–13	BSU Pavilion; Boise, Idaho
Mar 24, 1983*	(10 W)	vs. (6 W) No. 16 NC State; West Regional semifinal – Sweet Sixteen	L 56–75	18–14	Dee Events Center; Ogden, Utah
*Non-conference game. ^{#}Rankings from AP Poll. (#) Tournament seedings in parentheses. W=West.

== Awards and honors ==
- Pace Mannion – co-WAC Player of the Year

== NBA draft ==
Round	Pick	Player	NBA Club
2	43	Pace Mannion	Golden State Warriors
