= Pace Mannion =

American basketball player (born 1960)

Personal information
- Born: September 22, 1960 (age 66) Salt Lake City, Utah, U.S.
- Listed height: 6 ft 7 in (2.01 m)
- Listed weight: 190 lb (86 kg)

Career information
- High school: Chaparral (Paradise, Nevada)
- College: Utah (1979–1983)
- NBA draft: 1983: 2nd round, 43rd overall pick
- Drafted by: Golden State Warriors
- Playing career: 1983–2001
- Position: Small forward
- Number: 20, 18, 3, 12, 5

Career history
- 1983–1984: Golden State Warriors
- 1984–1986: Utah Jazz
- 1986–1987: New Jersey Nets
- 1987: Rockford Lightning
- 1987–1988: Milwaukee Bucks
- 1988–1989: Rockford Lightning
- 1989: Detroit Pistons
- 1989: Atlanta Hawks
- 1989–1993: Cantù
- 1993–1994: Benetton Treviso
- 1994–1995: Sioux Falls Skyforce
- 1995–1996: Juve Caserta
- 1996–1997: Reggiana
- 1997–1998: NKK Sea Hawks
- 1998–2000: Fabriano
- 2000–2001: Roseto
- 2001: Virtus Siena
- 2002: Cefalù

Career highlights
- All-CBA First Team (1989); WAC Player of the Year (1983); First-team All-WAC (1983)

Career NBA statistics
- Points: 660 (3.1 ppg)
- Assists: 231 (1.1 apg)
- Rebounds: 259 (1.2 rpg)
- Stats at NBA.com
- Stats at Basketball Reference

Pace Shewan Mannion (born September 22, 1960) is an American former professional basketball player who played in the National Basketball Association (NBA) and in the Italian league with the team of Cantù (which won the FIBA Korać Cup in 1991 defeating Real Madrid in the final when he scored 35 points). He has worked as a studio analyst for the Utah Jazz television pre- and post-game shows.

A 6 ft 7 in (201 cm) small forward born in Salt Lake City, Utah and from the University of Utah, he was selected 43rd overall by the Golden State Warriors in the 1983 NBA draft. Over six NBA seasons with as many teams, he averaged 3.1 points, 1.2 rebounds and 1.1 assists per game.

Mannion played for the Rockford Lightning of the Continental Basketball Association (CBA) from 1987 to 1989 and was selected to the All-CBA First Team in 1989.

== Career statistics ==
Legend
| GP | Games played | GS | Games started | MPG | Minutes per game |
| FG% | Field goal percentage | 3P% | 3-point field goal percentage | FT% | Free throw percentage |
| RPG | Rebounds per game | APG | Assists per game | SPG | Steals per game |
| BPG | Blocks per game | PPG | Points per game | **Bold** | Career high |

=== NBA ===
==== Regular season ====
| Year | Team | GP | GS | MPG | FG% | 3P% | FT% | RPG | APG | SPG | BPG | PPG |
|---|---|---|---|---|---|---|---|---|---|---|---|---|
| 1983–84 | Golden State | **57** | 0 | 8.2 | .397 | .231 | **.783** | 1.0 | 0.8 | 0.4 | 0.0 | 2.1 |
| 1984–85 | Utah | 34 | 0 | 5.6 | .429 | .000 | .696 | 0.7 | 0.8 | 0.5 | 0.1 | 2.1 |
| 1985–86 | Utah | **57** | 0 | 11.8 | .453 | .190 | .646 | 1.4 | 1.0 | 0.6 | 0.1 | **4.5** |
| 1986–87 | New Jersey | 23 | **3** | 12.3 | .330 | **.333** | .581 | **1.7** | **2.0** | **0.8** | **0.2** | 3.6 |
| 1987–88 | Milwaukee | 35 | 1 | **13.6** | .407 | .167 | .676 | 1.5 | 1.6 | 0.4 | **0.2** | 3.5 |
| 1988–89 | Detroit | 5 | 0 | 2.8 | **1.000** | .000 | .000 | 0.6 | 0.0 | 0.2 | 0.0 | 0.8 |
| 1988–89 | Atlanta | 5 | 0 | 3.6 | .333 | .000 | .000 | 0.4 | 0.4 | 0.4 | 0.0 | 0.8 |
| Career | | 216 | 4 | 9.8 | .413 | .203 | .663 | 1.2 | 1.1 | 0.5 | 0.1 | 3.1 |

==== Playoffs ====
| Year | Team | GP | GS | MPG | FG% | 3P% | FT% | RPG | APG | SPG | BPG | PPG |
|---|---|---|---|---|---|---|---|---|---|---|---|---|
| 1984–85 | Utah | **8** | 0 | **5.1** | **.333** | .000 | **.833** | **0.9** | **0.5** | **0.1** | **0.3** | **2.3** |
| Career | | 8 | 0 | 5.1 | .333 | .000 | .833 | 0.9 | 0.5 | 0.1 | 0.3 | 2.3 |

=== College ===
| Year | Team | GP | GS | MPG | FG% | 3P% | FT% | RPG | APG | SPG | BPG | PPG |
|---|---|---|---|---|---|---|---|---|---|---|---|---|
| 1979–80 | Utah | 28 | - | 16.3 | .378 | - | **.867** | 1.9 | - | 0.8 | 0.1 | 3.1 |
| 1980–81 | Utah | 28 | - | 32.2 | .448 | - | .595 | 3.3 | - | 1.0 | 0.2 | 6.9 |
| 1981–82 | Utah | 28 | - | **37.9** | .433 | - | .660 | 4.4 | - | 1.7 | **0.5** | 10.4 |
| 1982–83 | Utah | **32** | - | 37.3 | **.483** | - | .812 | **4.6** | - | **2.0** | 0.4 | **13.9** |
| Career | | 116 | - | 31.2 | .451 | - | .724 | 3.6 | - | 1.4 | 0.3 | 8.8 |

== Pace Mannion Fan Club ==
In 1983, a group of Rice University students at Wiess College started the Pace Mannion Fan Club after watching him trip over his own feet while taking a breakaway layup during the NCAA playoffs. The fan club would attend Mannion's NBA games in Houston and occasionally San Antonio, and would scream for Mannion to play, normally only to see him get a few minutes of floor time.

On January 14, 1986, Mannion and the Utah Jazz came to play the Houston Rockets, who had a 20-game home unbeaten streak. About 125 members of the Pace Mannion Fan Club attended the game.

The fan club cheered "Pace, Pace, he's our Mannion" all night. Utah coach Frank Layden sent Mannion into the game early in the fourth quarter. By the time the game ended, Mannion had 13 points. The Jazz won the game 105–102.

== Personal life ==
He is the father of basketball player Nico Mannion.
