= Danny Vranes =

American basketball player (born 1958)

Personal information
- Born: October 29, 1958 (age 68) Salt Lake City, Utah, U.S.
- Listed height: 6 ft 7 in (2.01 m)
- Listed weight: 210 lb (95 kg)

Career information
- High school: Skyline (Salt Lake City, Utah)
- College: Utah (1977–1981)
- NBA draft: 1981: 1st round, 5th overall pick
- Drafted by: Seattle SuperSonics
- Playing career: 1981–1992
- Position: Power forward
- Number: 23, 20

Career history
- 1981–1986: Seattle SuperSonics
- 1986–1988: Philadelphia 76ers
- 1988–1989: AEK Athens
- 1989–1992: Aresium Milan
- 1992: Cagiva Varese

Career highlights
- NBA All-Defensive Second Team (1985); Consensus second-team All-American (1981); 3× First-team All-WAC (1979–1981); Second-team All-WAC (1978); No. 23 retired by Utah Utes; Second-team Parade All-American (1977); McDonald's All-American (1977)

Career NBA statistics
- Points: 2,613 (5.1 ppg)
- Rebounds: 1,998 (3.9 rpg)
- Assists: 594 (1.2 apg)
- Stats at NBA.com
- Stats at Basketball Reference
Medals
Men's basketball
Representing United States
Pan American Games
Gold medal – first place	1979 San Juan	Team competition

Daniel LaDrew Vranes (born October 29, 1958) is an American former professional basketball player.

Vranes led Skyline High School, in Salt Lake City, to the state basketball championship in his senior year (1977). He was named to the inaugural McDonald's All-American team, which played in the 1977 Capital Classic. A 6'7" small forward from the University of Utah, he was selected by the Seattle SuperSonics in the 1st round (5th overall) of the 1981 NBA draft. Vranes played in seven NBA seasons with the SuperSonics and Philadelphia 76ers from 1981 to 1988.

He acquired a career high single-game total of 18 rebounds (nine offensive, nine defensive) on April 22, 1983, during a game 2 playoff elimination loss to the Portland Trail Blazers.

In his NBA career, Vranes played in 510 games and scored a total of 2,613 points. Perhaps his best year as a professional came during the 1983–84 season as a member of the SuperSonics, appearing in 80 games and averaging 8.4 points per game. On January 18, 1984, Vranes recorded a career high six blocks in a 114–107 win over the Dallas Mavericks. Known for his defense, after the 1984–85 season, he was named to the NBA All-Defensive Second Team. That season, on October 26, he recorded six steals, along with scoring a team-high 24 points, during a 102–94 win over the Utah Jazz.

He played in Europe for AEK BC, Teorematour Arese and Breeze Milano.

== Personal life ==
His ancestors emigrated to the United States from Croatia in the early 1900s. Vranes is a member of the Church of Jesus Christ of Latter-day Saints. He is a cousin of Jeff Judkins, his teammate at Utah.

Vranes's nephew is Utah Utes safety Jackson Bennee.

== Career statistics ==
Legend
GP	Games played	GS	Games started	MPG	Minutes per game
FG%	Field goal percentage	3P%	3-point field goal percentage	FT%	Free throw percentage
RPG	Rebounds per game	APG	Assists per game	SPG	Steals per game
BPG	Blocks per game	PPG	Points per game	**Bold**	Career high

=== NBA ===
==== Regular season ====
Year	Team	GP	GS	MPG	FG%	3P%	FT%	RPG	APG	SPG	BPG	PPG
1981–82	Seattle	77	1	14.0	**.546**	.000	.601	2.6	.7	.4	.3	4.9
1982–83	Seattle	**82**	**73**	25.0	.527	.000	.550	5.2	1.5	.6	.6	6.9
1983–84	Seattle	80	72	27.2	.521	.000	**.648**	4.9	1.7	.6	.7	**8.4**
1984–85	Seattle	76	70	**28.5**	.463	**.250**	.528	**5.7**	**2.0**	**1.0**	**.8**	5.8
1985–86	Seattle	80	19	19.6	.461	.000	.520	3.5	.9	.8	.4	3.8
1986–87	Philadelphia	58	6	14.1	.428	.200	.467	2.5	.5	.6	.4	2.4
1987–88	Philadelphia	57	5	13.5	.438	.000	.429	2.1	.6	.5	.6	2.1
Career		510	246	20.8	.496	.105	.570	3.9	1.2	.7	.5	5.1

==== Playoffs ====
Year	Team	GP	GS	MPG	FG%	3P%	FT%	RPG	APG	SPG	BPG	PPG
1982	Seattle	**6**		4.8	.200	–	.500	.3	.0	.2	.0	.5
1983	Seattle	2		28.0	.353	–	–	**9.5**	.5	.0	.5	6.0
1984	Seattle	5		**29.4**	**.410**	.000	**.571**	7.6	**2.2**	**.6**	**1.2**	**7.2**
1987	Philadelphia	2	0	1.5	–	–	–	1.5	.0	.0	.0	.0
Career		15	0	15.7	.377	.000	.556	4.1	.8	.3	.5	3.4
