= Utah Utes men's basketball =

Basketball team that represents the University of Utah

2026–27 Utah Utes men's basketball team
- University: University of Utah
- First season: 1908–09; 118 years ago
- Athletic director: Mark Harlan
- Head coach: Alex Jensen; 2nd season, 10–22 (.313)
- Location: Salt Lake City, Utah
- Arena: Jon M. Huntsman Center (capacity: 15,000)
- NCAA division: Division I
- Conference: Big 12
- Nickname: Utes
- Colors: Red and white
- All-time record: 1,923–1,121 (.632)
- NCAA tournament record: 38–32 (.543)

NCAA Division I tournament champions
- 1944
Other NCAA Division I tournament results
Runner-up	1998
Final Four	1944, 1961, 1966, 1998
Elite Eight	1944, 1945, 1956, 1961, 1966, 1997, 1998
Sweet Sixteen	1944, 1945, 1955, 1956, 1959, 1960, 1961, 1966, 1977, 1978, 1981, 1983, 1991, 1996, 1997, 1998, 2005, 2015
Appearances	1944, 1945, 1955, 1956, 1959, 1960, 1961, 1966, 1977, 1978, 1979, 1981, 1983, 1986, 1991, 1993, 1995, 1996, 1997, 1998, 1999, 2000, 2002, 2003, 2004, 2005, 2009, 2015, 2016

NIT champions
- 1947

Conference tournament champions
- WAC: 1995, 1997, 1999 MW: 2004, 2009

Conference regular-season champions
- MSAC: 1931, 1932, 1933, 1937 MSAC: 1938, 1945, 1955, 1956, 1959, 1960, 1961, 1962 WAC: 1966, 1977, 1981, 1983, 1986, 1991, 1993, 1995, 1996, 1997, 1998, 1999 MW: 2000, 2001, 2003, 2005, 2009

Conference division champions
- MSAC Western: 1931, 1932, 1933, 1937

Uniforms
Home	Away

The Utah Utes men's basketball team, also known as the Runnin' Utes, represents the University of Utah as an NCAA Division I program that plays in the Big-12. They play their home games at the Jon M. Huntsman Center. The school has made the NCAA tournament 29 times. They last made the tournament in 2016. Utah won the NCAA Championship in 1944, defeating Dartmouth College 42–40 for the school's only NCAA basketball championship. However, the school also claims the 1916 AAU National Championship, which was awarded after winning the AAU national tournament. They have also won the NIT once, defeating Kentucky in 1947. In 1998, the Utes played in the NCAA championship game, losing to Kentucky.

== History ==
Utah began play in 1908, finishing with a record of 3–8. However, by 1916, they had won their first national championship, winning the National AAU Tournament. The team would compete in the tournament two other times, in 1918 and 1919. But it wasn't until 1927 that Utah really began laying the foundation for what would become one of the winningest programs in college basketball.

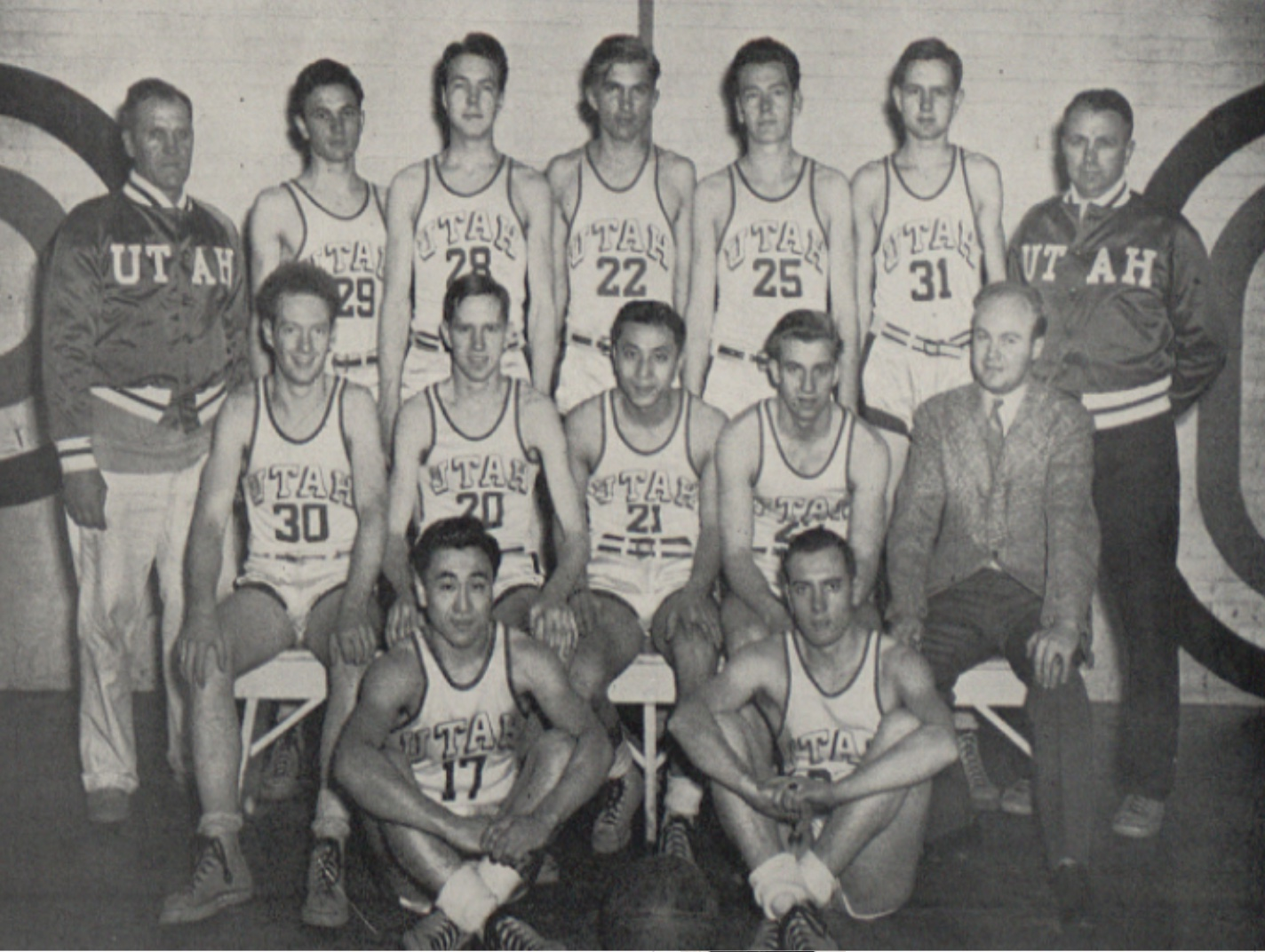
The Utes' 1944 national championship team.

That began with the hiring of Vadal Peterson, who would become the winningest coach in Utah basketball history. Peterson would guide Utah to 6 conference and state championships and reached the ultimate prize in 1944, when the Utes won the national championship. Oddly enough, Utah had turned down a bid to the NCAA tournament because they wanted to play in the NIT..

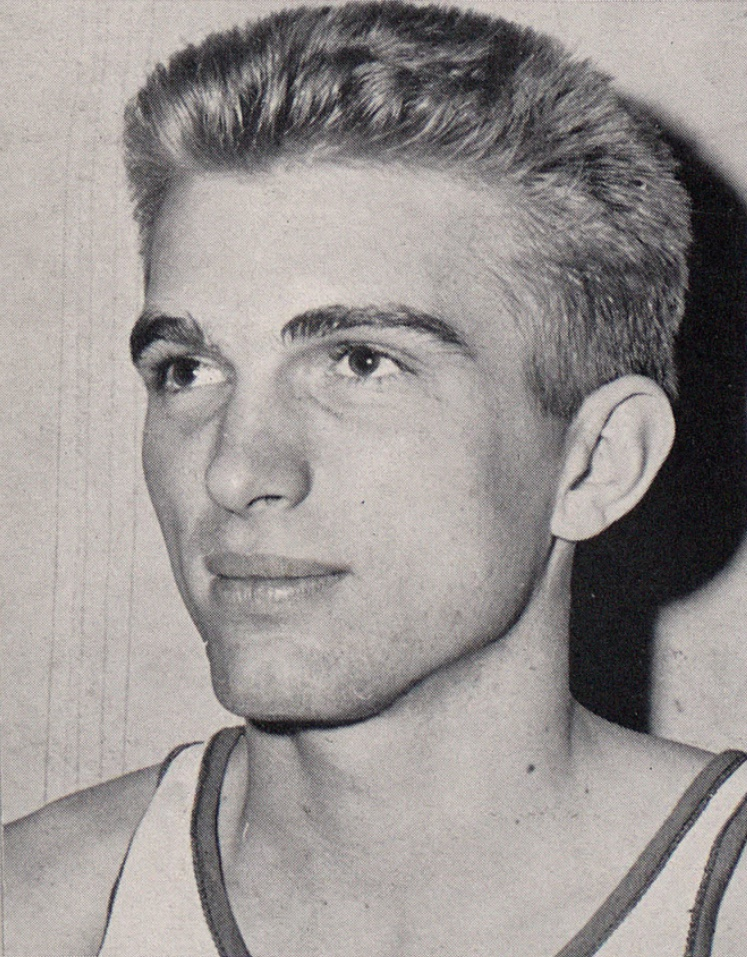
Arnie Ferrin, 1947.

However, after being bounced in the first round by Kentucky, Utah was given a second chance to play in the NCAA tournament. The Arkansas Razorbacks were forced to withdraw after two of their players were badly injured in a car accident. Needing a team to take the Razorbacks' place, the NCAA invited Utah. The Utes accepted and went on to defeat Dartmouth 42–40. Arnie Ferrin was named the tournament's Most Outstanding Player after scoring 28 points in the final two games.

Three years later, Peterson would lead Utah to the more prestigious NIT championship, as they defeated, ironically enough, Kentucky 49–45. Peterson retired from Utah with a 385–230 (.626) record and is the only coach in Utah history to have won a national championship.

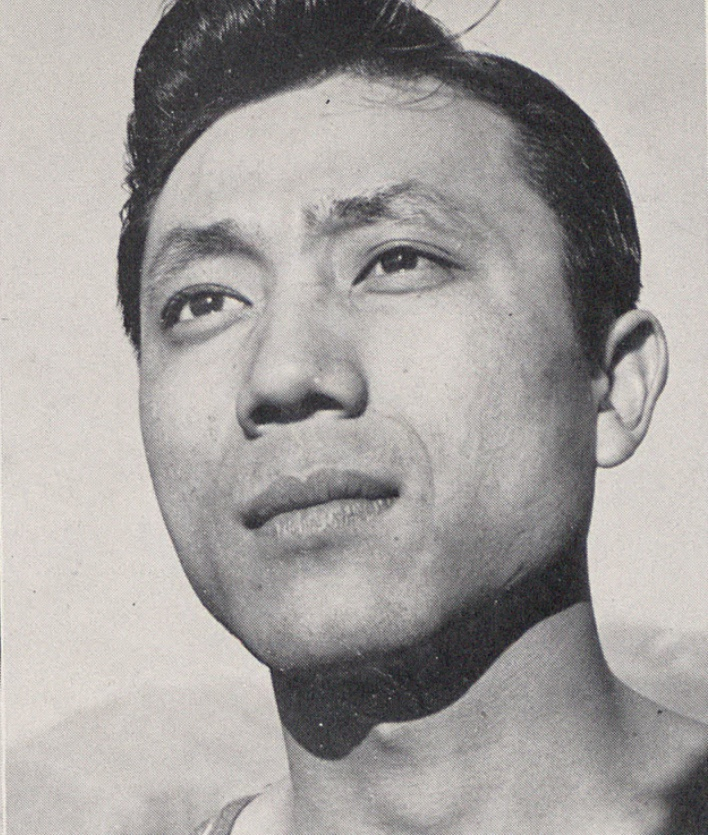
Wataru Misaka. 1947.

Wataru Misaka — a 5-foot-7-inch (1.70 m) point guard of Japanese descent who had led the Utah Utes to the 1944 NCAA and 1947 NIT championships, taking took a two-year hiatus between the titles to serve in the United States Army in the American occupation of Japan— later became the first person of color to play in modern professional basketball when he joined the New York Knicks, just months after Jackie Robinson had broken the color barrier in Major League Baseball for the Brooklyn Dodgers.

=== The Gardner era ===
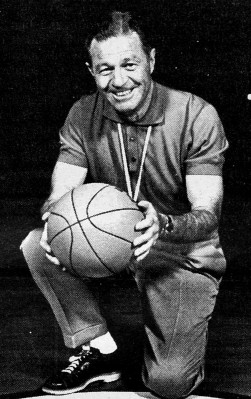
Jack Gardner was head coach of the Utes for 18 seasons (1953–1971) and finished with a record of 333–154.

After Peterson retired, Utah basketball was known as one of the strongest in the west. That tradition helped convince Kansas State head coach Jack Gardner to accept the job. Gardner had led the Wildcats to two Final Fours prior to accepting the job, and during his 18 years at Utah, he built a legacy for himself in Utah history.

Jack Gardner was known for his quick offenses, which is where Utah got its name as the Runnin' Redskins (later changed to the Utes). Because of his radical offensive sets, the Utes were widely regarded as the team that helped usher in a new era of college basketball. By his second season, Gardner had the Utes in their first NCAA Tournament since the 1945 season and the Utes dominated their way to a conference championship. Finishing the year 24–4, Utah reached #7 in the rankings, but was eliminated in the second round.

In Gardner's third season he once again guided the Utes to a conference championship and an NCAA tournament berth. That year the Utes climbed to 11th in the polls and made it to the Elite Eight, before bowing out to eventual champion San Francisco, who was led by future NBA legend and Hall of Famer Bill Russell. The Utes kept their postseason streak alive for Gardner's fourth and fifth seasons, making the NIT, however, they lost in the first round both years. In 1959, Utah again returned to the NCAA tournament, before losing to Idaho State in the second round. The Utes would make the NCAA tournament again in 1960, and were defeated in the second round, this time by Oregon.

==== 1961 Final Four ====
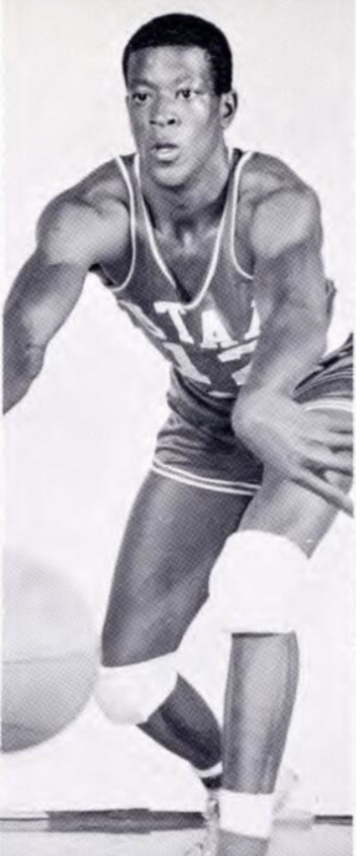
Billy McGill, 1961.

After getting eliminated in the second round in consecutive years, Jack Gardner and Utah finally made a run at the national championship in 1961. That year the Utes finished 23–8 and 12–2 in conference play. They were ranked 11th in the nation and faced Loyola-California in the first round. The Utes easily won 91–75 and advanced to the Elite Eight, where they defeated Arizona State 88–80, to make the school's first Final Four in 17 years. There they would face the eventual national champions Cincinnati Bearcats, losing 82–67. Though the season had ended short of the national championship, Utah had returned to the national stage and would prove to be a worthy national foe for years to come.

==== Western movement and a return to the Final Four ====
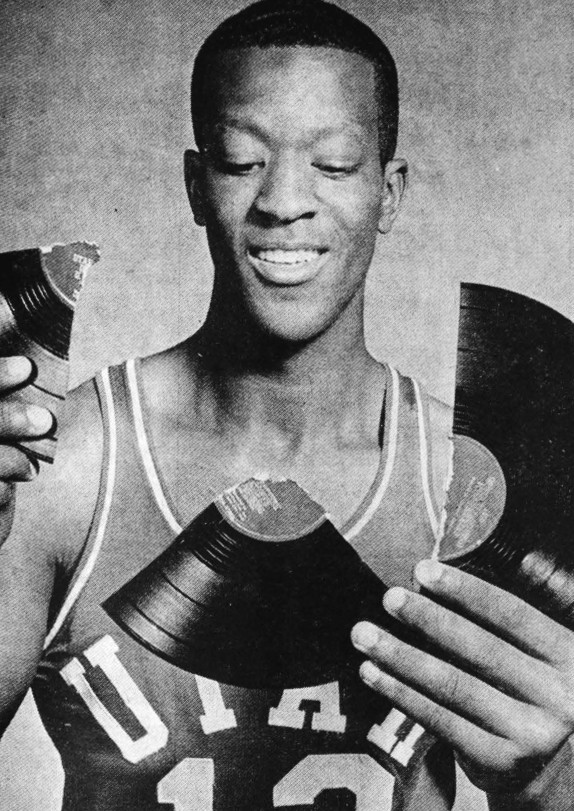
Bill "the Hill" McGill, 1962.

A season after the 1961 Final Four ushered in great change for Utah athletics. The Utes, along with the Arizona, Arizona State, BYU, New Mexico, and Wyoming decided to form the Western Athletic Conference. The highly competitive conference made it far more difficult for the Utes to win, as Gardner struggled in the first three years of the conference's formation. During that span the Utes would go 12–14, 19–9 and 17–9. However, by 1966 Utah was once again ready to make a national splash, after cruising to a conference championship and the program's first tournament berth since the 1961 season during that season.

Utah received a first round bye and faced Pacific in the semifinals. After a relatively easy 83–74 victory over the Tigers, Utah advanced to the Elite Eight where they would face the Oregon State Beavers. In a highly competitive game, the Utes came out on top, defeating the Beavers 70–64 to once again advance to the Final Four. This made Jack Gardner the first coach to guide two different teams to two Final Fours.

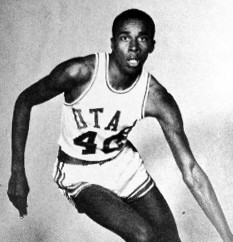
Utah forward Jerry Chambers was named NCAA basketball tournament Most Outstanding Player in 1966.

After getting by the Beavers, Utah faced Texas Western in the Final Four, with the winner advancing to play Kentucky for the national championship. Though the game was tight, Utah wore down at the end and the Miners edged the Utes 85–78 to advance to the national championship game. There Texas Western, under the leadership of the legendary Don Haskins, started five black players for the first time in NCAA Championship history. Texas Western would go on to defeat Kentucky, led by Adolph Rupp, to claim the 1966 national title, and would be inducted as a team in 2010. Though Utah lost to the Miners in the Final Four, Jerry Chambers was named the Most Outstanding Player, joining Arnie Ferrin as the only other Ute to win the award.

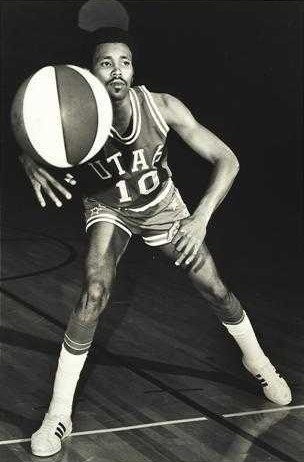
Mervin Jackson, 1970.

After the Utes' trips to the Final Four, the program would gradually regress in Gardner's final years. Though they posted winning seasons every year, they failed to make the NCAA tournament and only appeared in two NIT tournaments.

After the 1971 season, Gardner decided to retire, ending his career at Utah with a 339–154 record. He's the only coach to lead the Utes to two Final Fours and his legacy lives on, as Gardner was integral in getting the athletic department to build the Huntsman Center, the current home to the men's basketball team.

=== The revival of Utah basketball ===
Though the program had proven to be strong under Gardner, the team had struggled during the final years of his coaching career. After his retirement, Utah was faced with the daunting task of not only replacing a legend, but finding a coach who was capable of bringing Utah back to elite status.

The Utes looked to New Jersey, Rutgers to be exact, and found a successful unknown coach who had guided the Rutgers basketball team to some of their most successful seasons ever. Bill Foster, in the early part of 1971, was named the head coach of the Runnin' Utes. And though his stay with Utah wasn't long, he was essential to Utah's rebuilding plans. Though Foster got off to a slow start at Utah, going 13–12 and 8–19, his third and final season would prove to be a glimpse into Utah's successful future. He guided the team to a 22–8 season and an NIT berth. In the first round, Utah would face Foster's former team, Rutgers, however, they proved to be no match for the Utes as they easily dispatched of them 102–89. In the second round Utah blew out Memphis State 92–78 and then dominated Boston College 117–93 to advance to the title game. There they faced Purdue and though Utah kept it close, the Boilermakers prevailed, winning 87–81. Even with the loss, Utah basketball was showing signs of returning to its past glory, but it would have to do it under another coach, as Bill Foster quickly left Utah to rebuild Duke.

==== Under coach Jerry Pimm ====
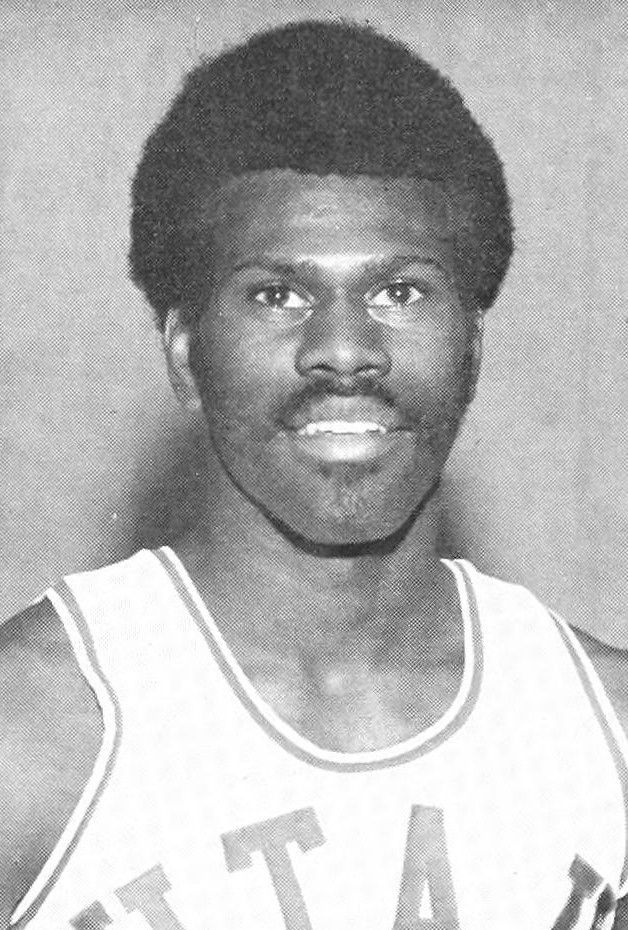
Luther "Ticky" Burden, 1974.

Utah did not have to go far for their next head coach, as they promoted Foster's assistant Jerry Pimm. The hire would prove to a good one, as he would continue what Foster had started. In Pimm's third season he guided the Utes to a conference championship and the NCAA Sweet 16, where they narrowly lost to UNLV. In his fourth year at Utah, he once again guided the Utes to the Sweet 16, however, again coming up short, losing a tough one to Notre Dame. Pimm would take Utah to its third NCAA Tournament in a row, but unlike the past two years, the Utes were upset in the first round by Pepperdine. After a year of not making the NCAA tournament, the Utes returned, crushing Northeastern 94–69, before barely losing to North Carolina 61–56. The Tar Heels would go on to the national championship game before losing to Indiana.

Though Pimm had been a successful coach at Utah, his relationship was strained with the athletic department and his final season with the Utes occurred in the 1983 campaign. Like he had in years before, Pimm would lead the Utes to the NCAA tournament and yet another Sweet 16 appearance, after Utah knocked off 7th seeded Illinois and then stunned 2nd seed UCLA in the second round. Yet, like in years past, the Utes failed to advance beyond the Sweet 16 and Utah's loss to eventual national champions North Carolina State would be Pimm's last game as Utah's head coach. He left the Utes for UC Santa Barbara. Pimm's record at Utah was 173–86 (.668). He won three conference championships and had four 20+ win seasons.

=== Struggles return ===
Pimm was gone and Utah was once again looking for a head coach. As with the Pimm hire, Utah stayed in-house and hired Pimm's lead assistant Lynn Archibald, who had previously coached at Idaho State before taking an assistant role with the Runnin' Utes. Though his resume was lacking, Archibald easily endeared himself to Utah fans through his kindness and rather clean image. Unfortunately, that never translated to success on the basketball court, as Archibald's teams often underperformed. Though he had mild success with the Utes, like guiding them to the WAC Championship in 1986 and the NCAA tournament, he could never build on what Foster and Pimm had started. In 6 seasons at Utah, he went 98–86 and though he made three postseason appearances in a row from 1986 to '88, the program never advanced beyond the first round. The final nail in Archibald's coffin came in the 1989 season, where the Utes went 6–10 in conference play. Archibald was fired from Utah, however, the program would reach new heights in the 1990s under the new leadership of Rick Majerus.

In 1986 and 1987, Montenegrin playmaker Luka Pavićević played for Utah. Pavićević won European club titles with Croatian team KK Jugoplastika. He was Yugoslav national team and Serbia and Montenegro national basketball team player, and in 2011 he became Montenegro national team coach.

=== The Majerus era ===
With Archibald gone, a fire that upset many fans, Utah looked to the Midwest for their next coach. Rick Majerus was named the 12th head coach of the University of Utah in April 1989. Although he was fairly unknown, Majerus had just finished possibly the best season in Ball State history, leading the Cardinals to a 29–3 record and a second round appearance in the NCAA tournament. During his run with Utah, he would guide them through the most successful period in the program's history, but it was a run that got off to a slow start.

Shortly after his first season with Utah began, Majerus had to step down because of medical reasons. He faced heart surgery and would not be able to lead the Utes for the rest of the year. The team was taken over by his assistant Joe Cravens and they limped to a 7–9 conference record. However, when Majerus returned for the next season, he was healthy and so was Utah's basketball program.

In his first full year as head coach, Majerus guided the Utes to a conference championship and an NCAA Sweet 16 appearance. Though Utah was crushed by undefeated UNLV, the success Majerus had in his first full season with the Utes proved Utah basketball was once again returning to its place as one of the strongest programs in the west.

During this time, a little quirk in the NCAA seeding had Utah facing Kentucky nearly every time they made the tournament. In 1993, the Utes were crushed by the Wildcats 83–62 in the second round. In 1996, the two met in the Sweet 16 with Kentucky defeating Utah 101–70. In 1997, the two would meet in the Elite Eight, with Kentucky winning 72–59, though that game was far more competitive than the final score indicated. The biggest meeting between the two would take place a year later, on the biggest stage and in the biggest game in Utah basketball history.

==== 1997–98 season: The drive for a championship ====
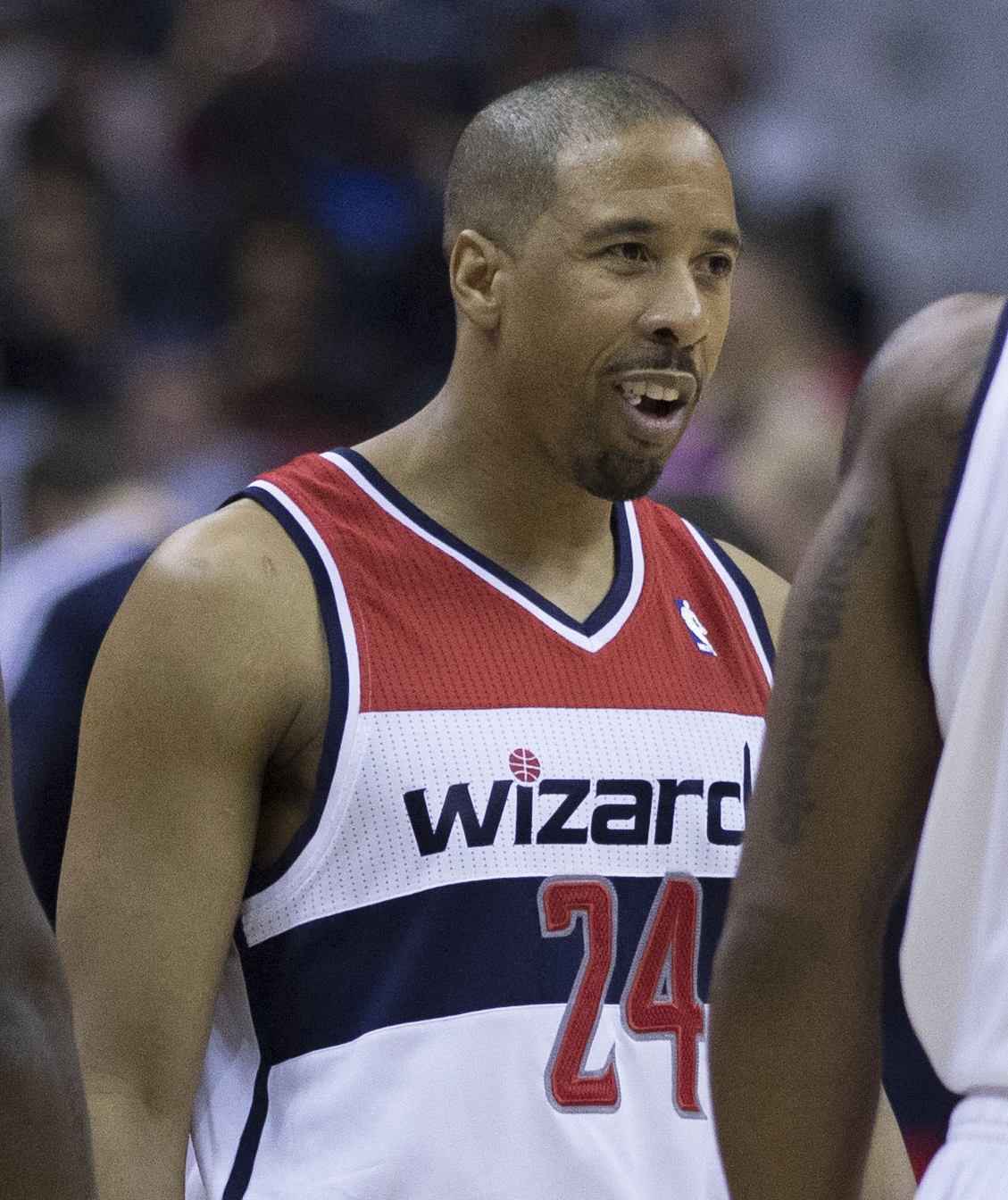
Andre Miller

The 1998 season kicked off with many predicting the Utes would take a step back. Utah had lost one of its best players in school history, as Keith Van Horn graduated. Yet led by Andre Miller and Michael Doleac, the Utes would begin an improbable run that would guide the program to its first national championship game in 54 years.

The Utes had dominated their way to a WAC championship and a top-5 ranking to end the 1998 regular season. They were given a #3 seed in the NCAA tournament and faced San Francisco in the first round. Unlike the last time these two teams met in the NCAA tournament, Utah cruised to an 85–68 victory. In the second round they faced Arkansas and pulled out a 75–69 victory to advance to the school's third straight Sweet 16, where they defeated West Virginia 65–62, giving the Utes a second straight trip to the Elite Eight.

Reaching the Elite Eight for the second time in a row was a feat in and of itself. However, most felt Utah's run would end in 1998, as they were facing #1 seed Arizona, the defending national champions. Yet, using the triangle-and-two defense, Utah defeated Arizona 76–51. The game, one of the worst losses in Wildcat history, pushed Utah to their first Final Four in 32 years, where they beat the #1 overall seed, North Carolina, 65–59.

Heading into the national championship, Utah was looking to become the first Mid-major Conference team to win the championship since UNLV won it in 1990. Like in the Elite Eight and Final Four, Utah jumped out to a large lead, going into the half up 10. However, they couldn't hold on and Kentucky fought back and using their depth and talent, they took over the game in the final minutes and cruised to a 78–69 victory. Once again the Utes' season was ended at the hands of Kentucky. This time though, it was a loss that cost Utah a national championship.

Utah's 1998 NCAA Tournament run capped one of the greatest seasons in Utah basketball history, and cemented the Utes standing on the national stage in the 1990s — where they were one of the nation's winningest programs.

Rick Majerus career would come to an end only a few years after that run. After guiding Utah to 3 more conference championships and 4 NCAA Tournament berths (1999, 2000, 2002, and 2003) which included another loss to Kentucky (the 2003 NCAA second round). Majerus retired from Utah, citing health concerns. He left the Utes with a 323–95 record, including 4 Sweet 16s, 2 Elite Eights and 1 Final Four.

=== Post-Majerus struggles ===
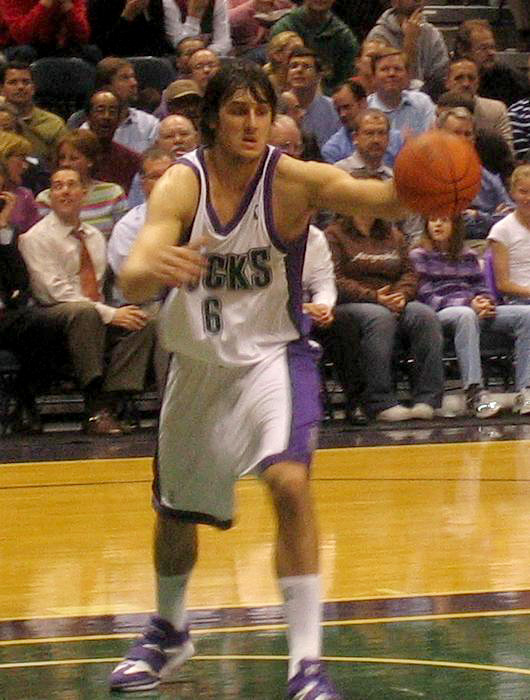
Andrew Bogut

After Kerry Rupp led the Utes to the NCAA tournament to finish out the remainder of Rick Majerus' season in 2004, Utah had to look for a coach for the first time in 15 years. After being turned down by Nevada head coach Trent Johnson, the Utes settled on Eastern Washington head coach Ray Giacoletti. An unknown from the Northwest, many fans were left wondering whether the hire would prove to be successful or not. And at first, it appeared it would be, as in his first season with the Utes, Giacoletti led them to a 29–6 record, a dominant 13–1 conference finish and a Sweet 16 appearance, the school's first since the amazing run in 1998. And, like in 1998, Utah would lose to their tournament nemesis, Kentucky. Utah finished the season ranked No. 14 in the nation; Andrew Bogut won the Naismith and Wooden Awards and was taken No. 1 overall in the 2005 NBA draft. Yet that success ultimately did Giacoletti in, as the Utes lost too much from that season and failed to finish above .500 in consecutive years for the first time since the 1983–84 and 1984–85 seasons.

On March 3, 2007, Giacoletti resigned as Utah's head coach effective after the season. The resignation came a day before Utah was to play rival BYU, a game they were blown out in. Giacoletti finished his career at Utah with an 80–54 loss to UNLV in the first round of the Mountain West Conference tournament. Giacoletti was 54–40 at Utah, with one conference championship and a 2–1 NCAA Tournament record.

=== The Boylen slump ===
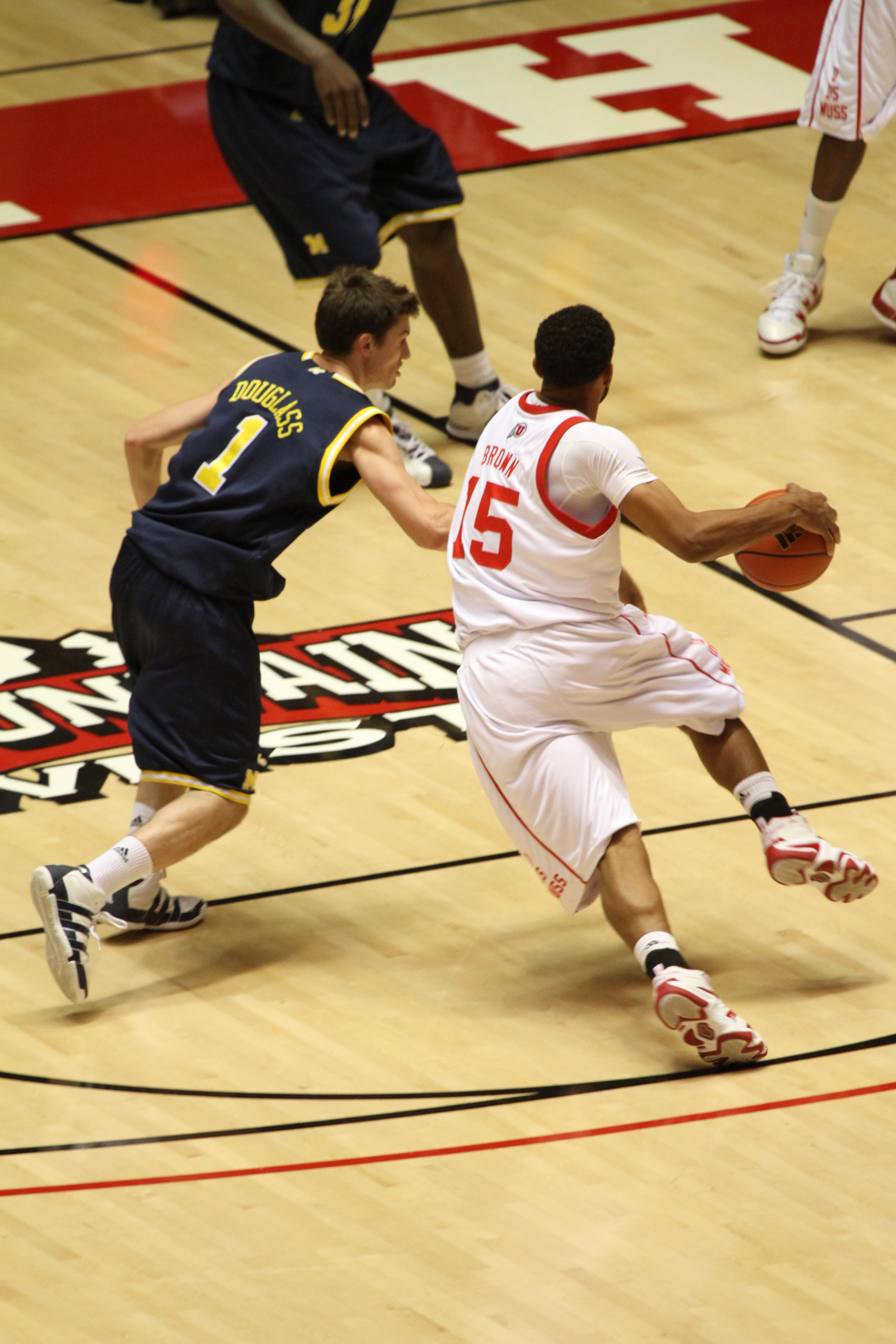
Carlon Brown (#15) driving to the basket playing against Michigan at home in December 2009

On March 26, 2007, it was announced that Jim Boylen would succeed Ray Giacoletti. Boylen, an assistant under Tom Izzo, came to Utah after spending over 20 years as an assistant at the collegiate and pro level. His 13 years in the NBA as an assistant with the Houston Rockets, Golden State Warriors and Milwaukee Bucks appeared to have been an asset for a Utah program known for getting successful players into the NBA.

Jim Boylen went 18–15 in his first year at Utah, guiding the Utes to their first postseason tournament in 3 years, as they made the inaugural College Basketball Invitational, where they advanced to the second round before losing to the Tulsa Golden Hurricane.

They also won the 2009 Mountain West Conference men's basketball tournament in a close 52–50 victory over San Diego State Aztecs. Utah entered the NCAA tournament as a number 5 seed. The Utes would then be upset by the 12 seed Arizona Wildcats 84–71 in the first round.

On March 12, 2011, the University of Utah fired Jim Boylen after consecutive losing seasons.

=== Krystkowiak leads the Utes into the Pac-12 ===
On April 3, 2011, the University of Utah announced Larry Krystkowiak would take over the head coaching position as the Utes transition in the inaugural season of the newly expanded Pac-12. Krystkowiak, a former NBA player and coach, in his previous NCAA head coaching position spent two seasons with his alma mater of Montana (2004–06), leading the Grizzlies to Big Sky Conference tournament wins and NCAA tournament appearances in both seasons. In 2006 the Grizzlies beat a heavily favored Nevada team for Krystkowiak's only NCAA tournament victory as a head coach, before joining the Utes.

Overall, Krystkowiak had compiled a record of 42–20 as an NCAA Division I head coach before moving on to coach with the Milwaukee Bucks and New Jersey Nets.

Krystkowiak took charge of a depleted Utah roster which lost 8 players in the wake of his hiring. In their first season under Krystokwiak's charge, the 2011–2012 Utes would struggle to a 6–25 record including a 3–15 mark against Pac-12 opponents. This season saw the dismissal of star player Josh "Jiggy" Watkins. The 2011–2012 Utes were led in scoring by Jason Washburn and Chris Hines.

After what would go down as one of the worst seasons in Utah basketball history, Krystkowiak and his staff got to work installing their own system. The 2012 recruiting class saw Utah sign players who would become major parts of the system in 6'5" SF/SG Dakrai Tucker, 5'9" PG Brandon Taylor, 6'11 C Dallin Bachynski, and other signings. The biggest of these signings, though, would prove to be the highly touted West Jordan High School product Jordan Loveridge. Having received offers from multiple programs nationally, Loveridge skipped the likes of BYU, Colorado, and Utah State for the Utes. At the time of his signing, Loveridge was ranked 12th in ESPNU's list of the top 50 recruits in the West for the 2012 graduating class.

=== The Rebuild ===
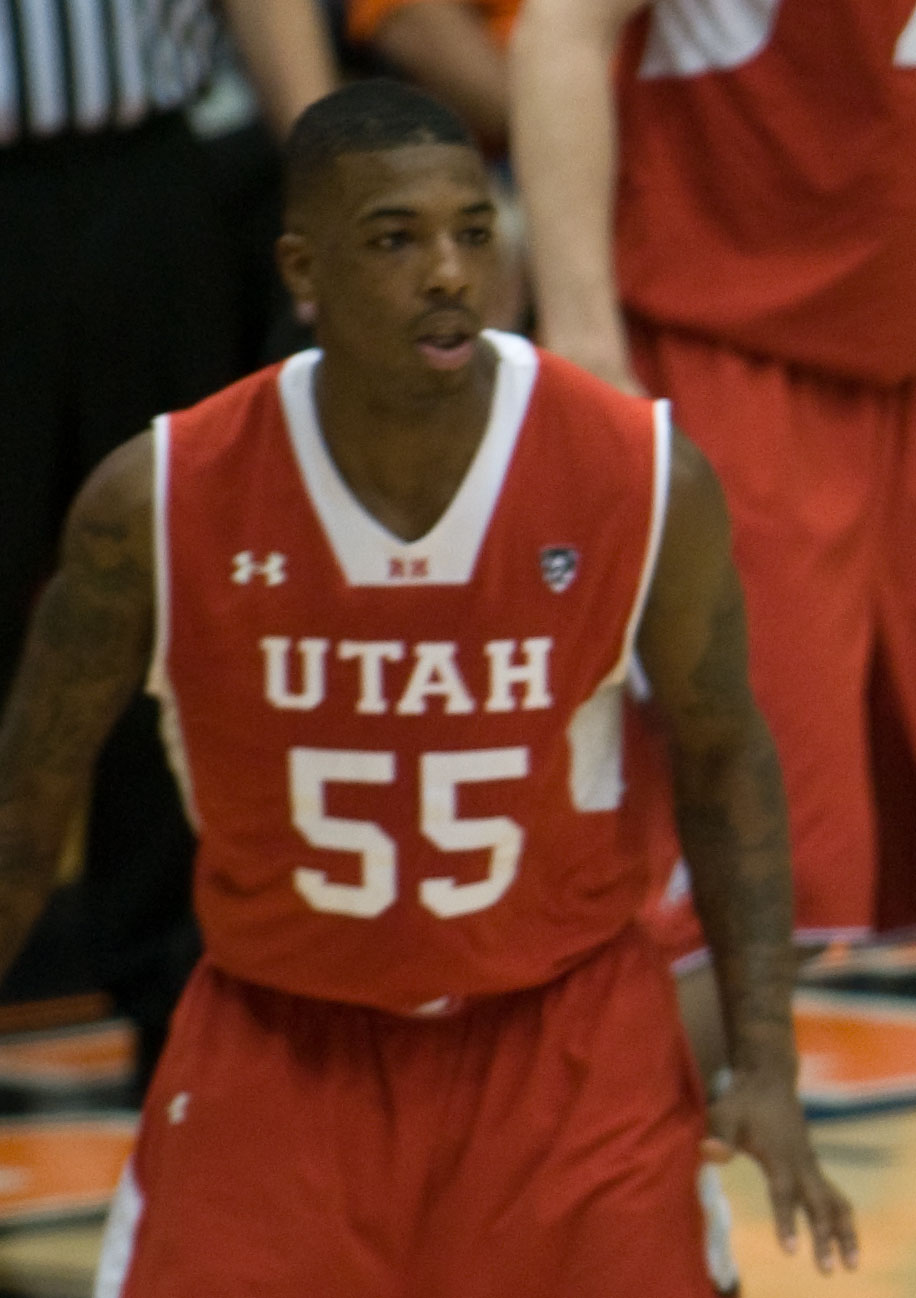
Delon Wright, 2015.

Led by strong leadership from senior center Jason Washburn and major contributions from Loyola Marymount transfer shooting guard Jarred DuBois and the new freshmen, the 2012–2013 Utah Runnin' Utes put together a 15–18 season which included a run to the Pac-12 Tournament semifinal. The Utes fortunes' continued to grow as news of a recruiting class which included NBA swingman Dorell Wright's brother, junior college point guard Delon Wright, meshed with a loss of only 3 players who saw considerable minutes.

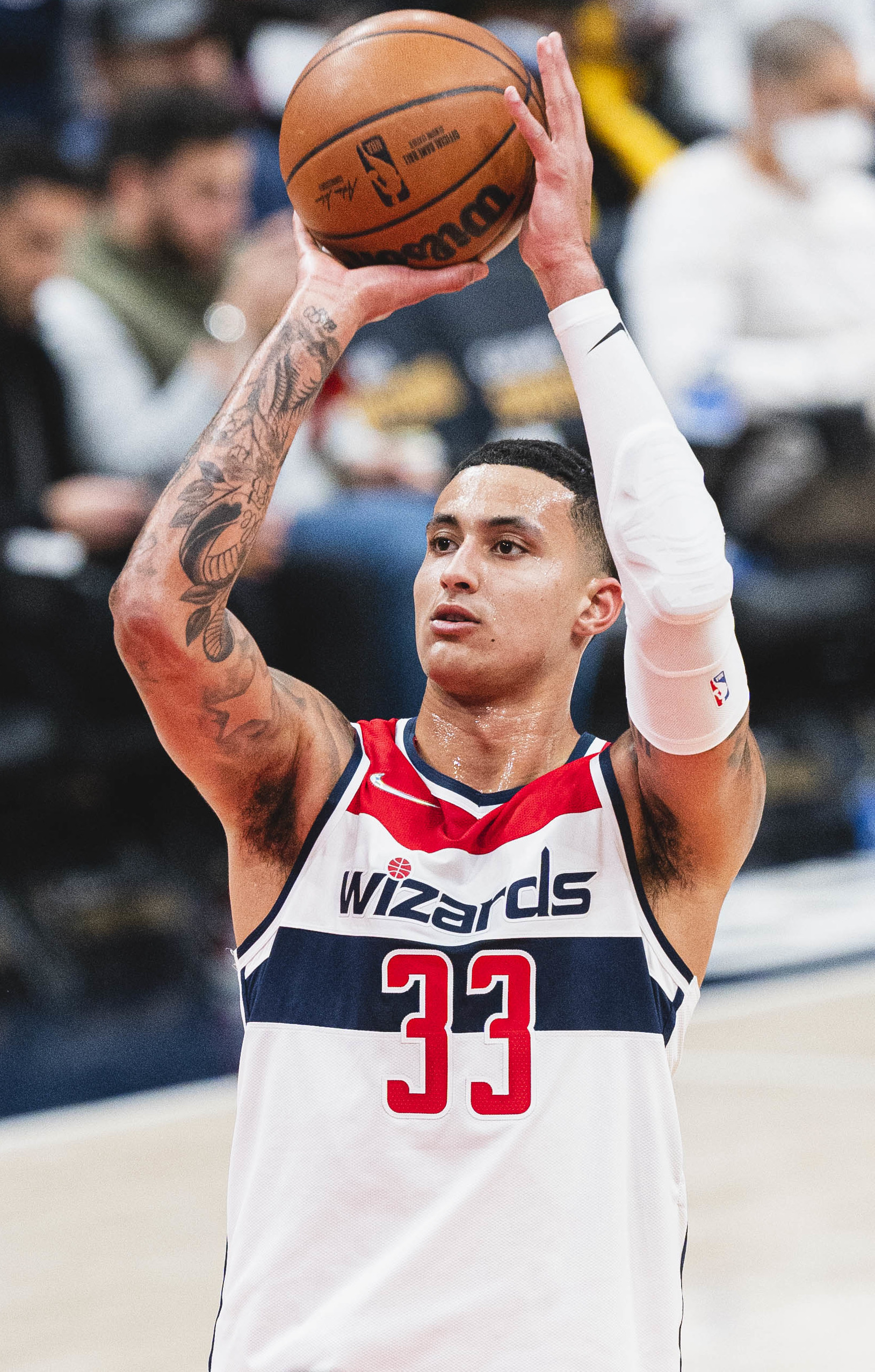
Kyle Kuzma

The 2013–2014 season marked a medial return to form for the Runnin' Utes as the team put up a 21–12 record, including a 9–9 mark in Pac-12 play. With new guard Delon Wright and sophomore guard Brandon Taylor often starting together in the backcourt and Jordan Loveridge staying in his starting small forward position, the Utes saw a jump in scoring from 64.2 PTS/G to a much more potent 75.1 PTS/G. This year also saw the Utes beat their rival Brigham Young University Cougars for the first time in seven tries in a game where the homegrown Jordan Loveridge would score a game high 21 points to go with his 6 rebounds and 5 assists. After the game, Loveridge would declare "it just shows that Utah basketball is back. We're heading in the right direction every day and we're only going to go up from here". The season culminated in Utah's first postseason action in many seasons, where Utah lost to Saint Mary's College in the NIT, 70–58. This season's recruiting class included a pair of four star recruits in Brekkott Chapman and Kyle Kuzma, both forwards, but the jewel of the class turned out to be the Austrian seven-footer Jakob Pöltl. As the season drew nearer, optimism surrounded the Utes, with some outlets predicting a run to the NCAA tournament.

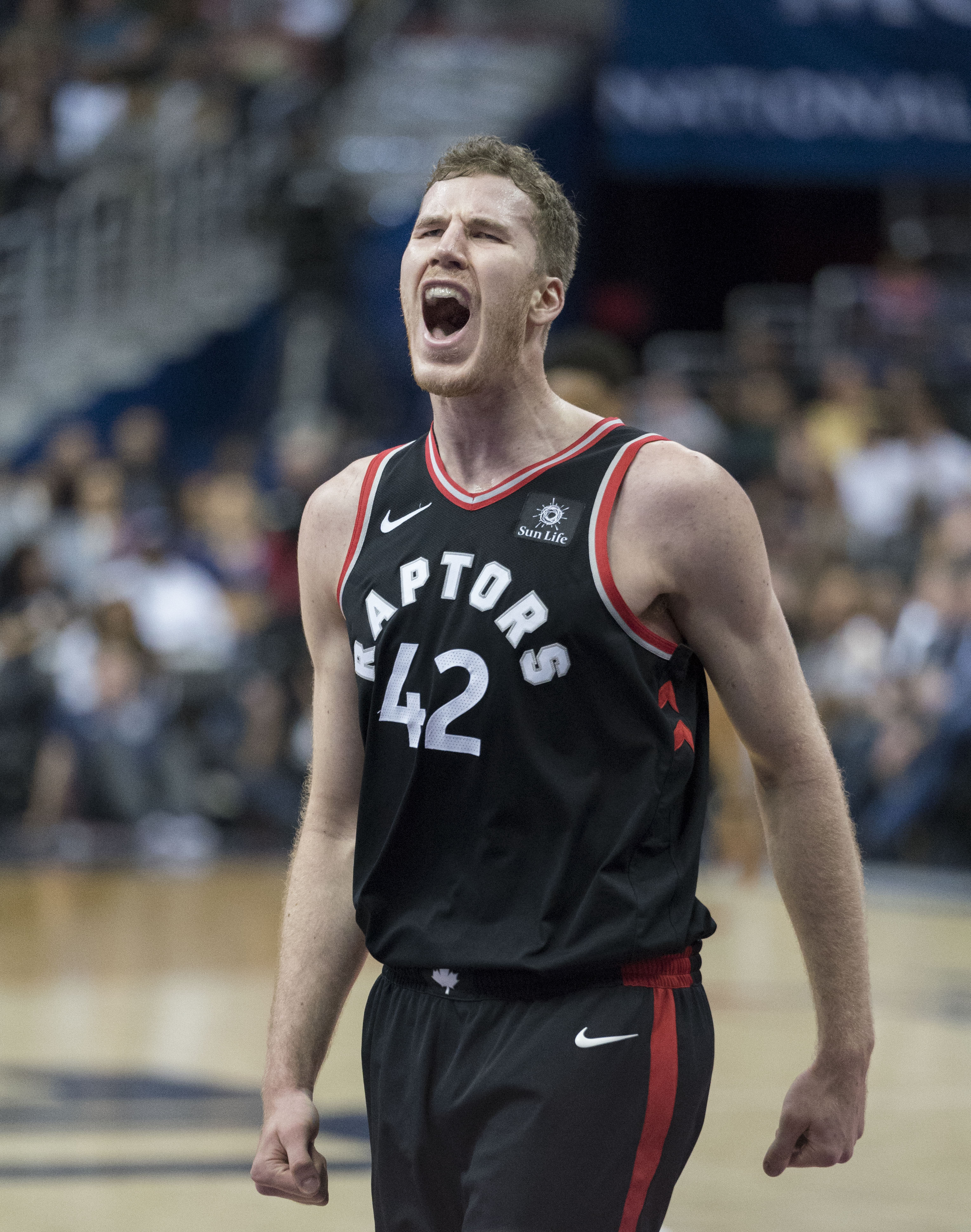
Jakob Pöltl

The Runnin' Utes stormed out of the gates in the 2014–2015 season, amassing a 14–2 record in their first 16 games with losses to number 16 San Diego State and number 10 Kansas. Wins included a repeat victory against BYU and an overtime thriller against number 8 Wichita State. The season would end in a Sweet Sixteen trip for the Runnin' Utes where they lost to the eventual champion Duke Blue Devils by a score of 63–57. The Utes' defense improved to allow only 57.1 points a game in contrast to the previous year's 64.3 as the passing lanes were consistently clogged by senior Delon Wright and junior Brandon Taylor who combined to average 3.4 steals a game to go with their combined scoring output of 25.1 points a game. Freshman Jakob Pöltl proved himself to be a major part of the defensive resurgence, averaging nearly 2 blocks a game to go with his 9 points and nearly 7 rebound average. Junior Jordan Loveridge improved upon his high shooting percentage to shoot 43% from three-point range, and the rest of the team joined in, putting up the 7th best 3-point shooting percentage in the nation.

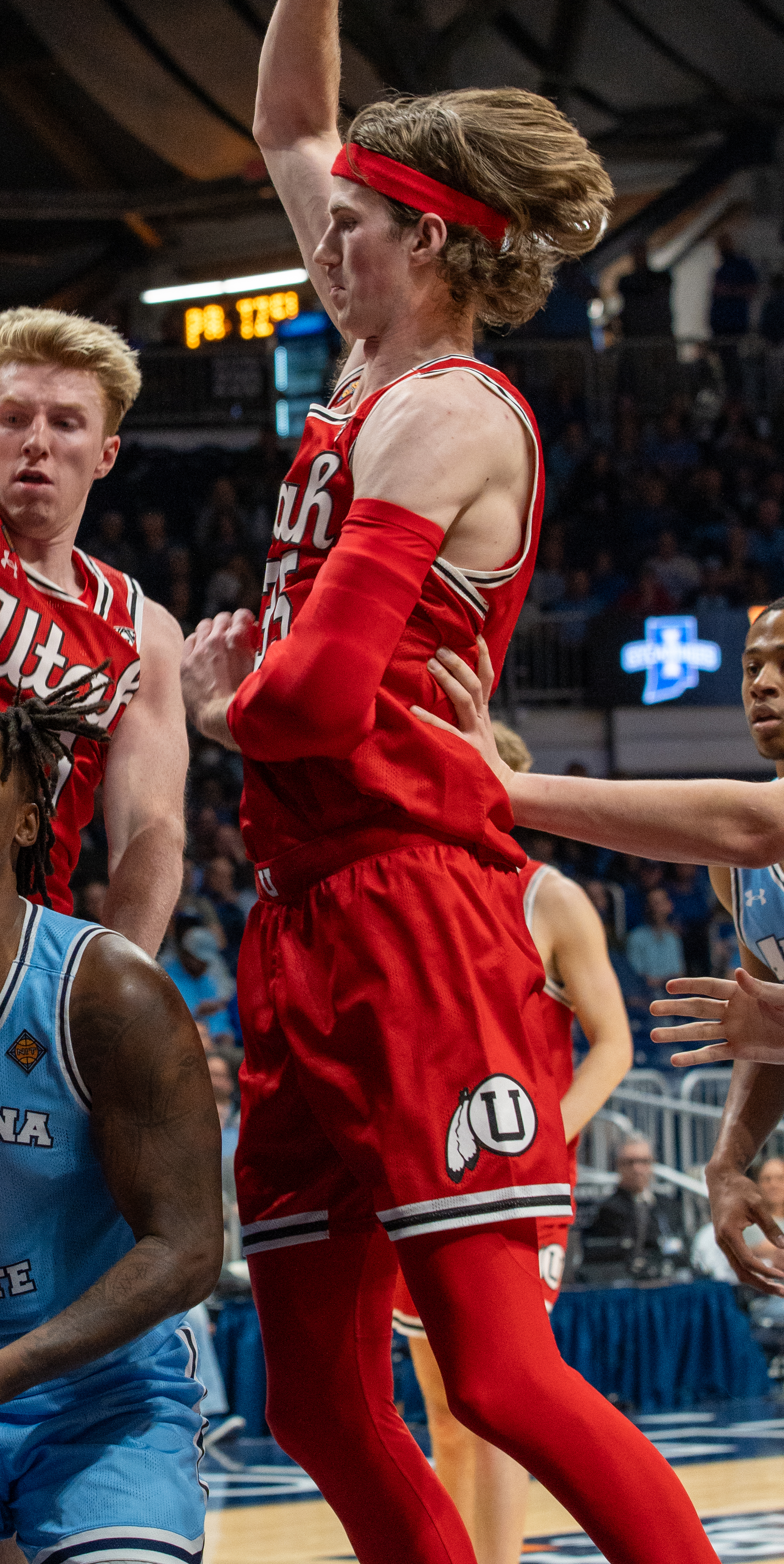
Branden Carlson, 2024.

The team then had a 26–9 record and a run to the Sweet 16 in the 2015 NCAA tournament. Senior Delon Wright won the 2015 Bob Cousy Award as the nation's top point guard. The next season, sophomore center Jakob Pöltl was named a consensus second-team All-American, the Pac-12 Conference Men's Basketball Player of the Year, and the recipient of the Kareem Abdul-Jabbar Award as the nation's top college center. Utah became the only school in the Pac-12 to produce a first-round NBA Draft selection in each of three consecutive years: Delon Wright in 2015, Jakob Pöltl in 2016, and Kyle Kuzma in 2017. The team then reached the national postseason finals of the 2018 National Invitation Tournament, where they finished as the national runner-up after being defeated by the Penn State Nittany Lions. In the early 2020s, the program was anchored by 7-foot center Branden Carlson, who finished his career as the team's all-time leader in blocks and fifth on Utah's all-time scoring list, before the university fired head coach Craig Smith and hired former Ute and then-current Dallas Mavericks assistant coach Alex Jensen in 2025 to lead the team into the Big 12 Conference.

In June 2026, Danish–Israeli point guard Noam Yaacov signed with Utah for the 2026–27 season. He had most recently played for the Belgian team Oostende of the BNXT League, where he was a finalist for the league's MVP award, and the Israeli senior national team.

== Individual honors ==
=== Naismith Memorial Basketball Hall of Fame ===
The following Runnin' Utes have been inducted into the Basketball Hall of Fame:

Year	Inductee	Position
1984	Jack Gardner	Coach

=== Ute All-Americans ===
Player	Year(s)	Team(s)
Dick Romney	1916	Consensus First Team – Helms (1st)
Bill Kinner	1935	Converse (3rd)
Bill Kinner	1936	Consensus First Team – Helms (1st), College Humor (2nd)
Arnie Ferrin	1944	Consensus Second Team – Helms (1st), Converse (1st)
Arnie Ferrin	1945	Consensus First Team – Helms (2nd), Converse (1st), Argosy (2nd), Sporting News (1st)
Arnie Ferrin	1947	Consensus Second Team – Helms (1st), Converse (2nd)
Arnie Ferrin	1948	Consensus Second Team – AP (2nd), Helms (2nd)
Vern Gardner	1947	Consensus Second Team – Converse (1st)
Vern Gardner	1948	Converse (3rd)
Vern Gardner	1949	Consensus Second Team – AP (2nd), UPI (2nd), Look (1st)
Glen Smith	1952	Look (2nd), Collier's (1st)
Art Bunte	1955	NEA (3rd), INS (2nd)
Art Bunte	1956	Collier's (2nd)
Billy McGill	1960	AP (3rd), NABC (3rd)
Billy McGill	1961	Consensus Second Team – AP (2nd), USBWA (1st), NABC (2nd), UPI (2nd), NEA (2nd), NCAB (2nd)
Billy McGill	1962	Consensus First Team – AP (1st), USBWA (1st), NABC (1st), UPI (1st), NEA (1st), Sporting News (1st)
Merv Jackson	1968	USBWA (1st), NABC (3rd)
Luther Burden	1975	Consensus Second Team – AP (1st), USBWA (2nd), NABC (2nd), UPI (2nd)
Danny Vranes	1981	Consensus Second Team – AP (2nd), USBWA (2nd), NABC (2nd), UPI (3rd)
Josh Grant	1993	UPI (3rd)
Keith Van Horn	1996	Consensus Second Team – AP (2nd), USBWA (2nd), NABC (2nd), UPI (2nd)
Keith Van Horn	1997	Consensus First Team – AP (1st), USBWA (1st), NABC (1st)
Andre Miller	1998	USBWA (3rd)
Andre Miller	1999	Consensus First Team – AP (1st), USBWA (1st), NABC (1st), Sporting News (1st)
Andrew Bogut	2005	Consensus First Team – AP (1st), USBWA (1st), NABC (1st), Sporting News (1st)
Delon Wright	2015	Consensus Second Team – AP (2nd), USBWA (2nd), NABC (2nd), Sporting News (1st)
Jakob Pöltl	2016	Consensus Second Team – AP (2nd), USBWA (2nd), NABC (2nd), Sporting News (1st)

- John R. Wooden Award National Player of the Year

Andrew Bogut–2005

- Naismith College Player of the Year

Andrew Bogut–2005

- Associated Press College Basketball Player of the Year

Andrew Bogut–2005

- NABC Player of the Year

Andrew Bogut–2005

- Oscar Robertson Trophy

Andrew Bogut–2005

- Bob Cousy Award

Delon Wright–2015

- Kareem Abdul-Jabbar Award

Jakob Pöltl–2016

- Pete Newell Big Man Award

Andrew Bogut–2005
Jakob Pöltl–2016

- Frances Pomeroy Naismith Award

Jeff Jonas–1977

- NCAA basketball tournament Most Outstanding Player

Arnie Ferrin–1944
Jerry Chambers–1966

- WAC Player of the Year

Pace Mannion–1983
Josh Grant–1991, 1992
Keith Van Horn–1995, 1996, 1997
Andre Miller–1999

- Mountain West Conference Men's Basketball Player of the Year

Alex Jensen–2000
Britton Johnsen–2002
Andrew Bogut–2005
Luke Nevill–2009

- Pac-12 Conference Men's Basketball Player of the Year

Jakob Pöltl–2016

== Head coaches ==
Name	Seasons	Record
Erastus J. Milne	1908–09	3–8
Robert Richardson	1909–10	17–3
Fred Bennion	1911–14	44–9
Thomas Fitzpatrick	1917–25	42–30
Ike Armstrong	1925–27	9–18
Vadal Peterson	1927–53	385–230
Jack Gardner	1953–71	339–154
Bill Foster	1971–74	43–39
Jerry Pimm	1974–83	173–86
Lynn Archibald	1983–89	98–86
Rick Majerus	1989-04	323–95
Joe Cravens (acting)	1989–90	12–12
Dick Hunsaker (acting)	2000–01	18–12
Kerry Rupp (interim)	2004	9–4
Ray Giacoletti	2005–07	54–40
Jim Boylen	2007–11	69–60
Larry Krystkowiak	2011–2021	137–96
Craig Smith	2021–2025	65–62
Josh Eilert (interim)	2025	1–4
Alex Jensen	2025–present	0–0

== Postseason ==
=== NCAA tournament results ===
The Utes have appeared in 29 NCAA tournaments. Their combined record is 38–32. They were national champions in 1944.

Year	Round	Opponent	Result/Score
1944	Quarterfinals; Final Four; National Championship Game	Missouri; Iowa State; Dartmouth	W 45–35; W 40–31; W 42–40 OT
1945	Quarterfinals; Regional 3rd-place game	Oklahoma State; Oregon	L 37–62; L 66–69
1955	Regional semifinals Regional 3rd-place game	San Francisco; Seattle	L 59–78; W 108–85
1956	Regional semifinals Regional Finals	Seattle; San Francisco	W 81–72; L 77–92
1959	Regional semifinals Regional 3rd-place game	California; Idaho State	L 53–71; L 65–71
1960	Regional Quarterfinals; Regional semifinals Regional 3rd-place game	USC; Oregon; Santa Clara	W 80–73; L 54–65; W 89–81
1961	Regional semifinals Regional Finals; Final Four; National 3rd-place game	Loyola Marymount; Arizona State; Cincinnati; Saint Joseph's	W 91–75; W 88–80; L 67–82; L 120–127 4OT
1966	Regional semifinals Regional Finals; Final Four; National 3rd-place game	Pacific; Oregon State; UTEP; Duke	W 83–51; W 70–64; L 78–85; L 77–79
1977	First round Sweet Sixteen	St. John's; UNLV	W 72–68; L 83–88
1978	First round Sweet Sixteen	Missouri; Notre Dame	W 86–79 2OT; L 56–69
1979	First round	Pepperdine	L 88–92 OT
1981	Second Round; Sweet Sixteen	Northeastern; North Carolina	W 94–69; L 56–61
1983	First round Second Round; Sweet Sixteen	Illinois; UCLA; NC State	W 52–49; W 67–61; L 56–75
1986	First round	North Carolina	L 72–84
1991	First round Second Round; Sweet Sixteen	South Alabama; Michigan State; UNLV	W 82–72; W 85–84 OT; L 66–83
1993	First round Second Round	Pittsburgh; Kentucky	W 86–65; L 62–83
1995	First round Second Round	Long Beach State; Mississippi State	W 76–64; L 64–78
1996	First round Second Round; Sweet Sixteen	Canisius; Iowa State; Kentucky	W 72–43; W 73–67; L 70–101
1997	First round Second Round; Sweet Sixteen; Elite Eight	Navy; Charlotte; Stanford; Kentucky	W 75–61; W 77–58; W 82–77 OT; L 59–72
1998	First round Second Round; Sweet Sixteen; Elite Eight; Final Four; National Championship Game	San Francisco; Arkansas; West Virginia; Arizona; North Carolina; Kentucky	W 85–68; W 75–69; W 65–62; W 76–51; W 65–59; L 69–78
1999	First round Second Round	Arkansas State; Miami (OH)	W 80–58; L 58–66
2000	First round Second Round	Saint Louis; Michigan State	W 48–45; L 61–73
2002	First round	Indiana	L 56–75
2003	First round Second Round	Oregon; Kentucky	W 60–58; L 54–74
2004	First round	Boston College	L 51–58
2005	First round Second Round; Sweet Sixteen	UTEP; Oklahoma; Kentucky	W 60–54; W 67–58; L 52–62
2009	First round	Arizona	L 71–84
2015	Second Round; Third round Sweet Sixteen	Stephen F. Austin; Georgetown; Duke	W 57–50; W 75–64; L 57–63
2016	First round Second Round	Fresno State; Gonzaga	W 80–69; L 59–82

=== NIT results ===
The Utes have appeared in 15 National Invitation Tournaments (NIT). Their combined record is 18–16. They were NIT Champions in 1947.

Year	Round	Opponent	Result/Score
1944	Quarterfinals	Kentucky	L 38–46
1947	Quarterfinals; Semifinals; Championship Game	Duquesne; West Virginia; Kentucky	W 45–44; W 64–62; W 49–45
1949	Quarterfinals	San Francisco	L 63–64
1957	First round	Memphis	L 75–77
1958	Quarterfinals	St. John's	L 70–71
1970	First round Quarterfinals	Duke; Marquette	W 78–75; L 63–83
1974	First round Quarterfinals; Semifinals; Championship Game	Rutgers; Memphis; Boston College; Purdue	W 102–89; W 92–78; W 117–93; L 81–87
1987	First round	Boise State	L 61–62
1988	First round	Evansville	L 55–66
1992	First round Second Round; Quarterfinals; Semifinals; 3rd-place game	Ball State; Arizona State; Rhode Island; Notre Dame; Florida	W 72–57; W 80–58; W 84–72; L 55–58; W 81–78
2001	First round	Memphis	L 62–71
2014	First round	Saint Mary's	L 58–70
2017	First round	Boise State	L 68–73
2018	First round Second Round; Quarterfinals; Semifinals; Championship Game	UC Davis; LSU; Saint Mary's; Western Kentucky; Penn State	W 69–59; W 95–71; W 67–58^{OT} W 69–64; L 66–82
2024	First round Second Round; Quarterfinals; Semifinals	UC Irvine; Iowa; VCU; Indiana State	W 84–75; W 91–82; W 74–54; L 90–100

=== CBC results ===
The Utes have appeared in one College Basketball Crown (CBC). Their record is 0–1.

Year	Round	Opponent	Result/Score
2025	First Round	Butler	L 84–86

=== CBI results ===
The Utes have appeared in one College Basketball Invitational (CBI). Their record is 1–1.

Year	Round	Opponent	Result/Score
2008	First round Quarterfinals	UTEP; Tulsa	W 81–69; L 60–69

=== National Campus Basketball Tournament results ===
The Utes appeared in the only National Campus Basketball Tournament. Their record is 2–1.

Year	Round	Opponent	Result/Score
1951	Quarterfinals; Semifinals; 3rd-place game	Villanova; Syracuse; Wyoming	W 67–65; L 57–74; W 55–52

== Top-25 finishes ==
The University of Utah has consistently been a top-25 team throughout its history. Outside of various seasons cracking the top-25, Utah has ended the season ranked in the top-25 20 times.

Year	Record	Ranking
1949	24- 7	12
1955	24- 4	7
1956	22- 6	18
1959	25- 7	18
1960	26- 3	7
1961	24- 7	11
1962	23- 3	7
1974	22- 8	15
1977	23- 7	14
1978	23- 6	14
1981	25- 5	14
1991	30- 4	10
1993	24- 7	19
1995	28- 6	19
1996	27- 7	12
1997	29- 4	2
1998	30- 4	7
1999	28- 5	6
2005	29- 6	18
2009	24- 10	25
2015	26- 9	15
2016	27- 9	13

== Retired numbers ==
Utah has retired the numbers of seven players:

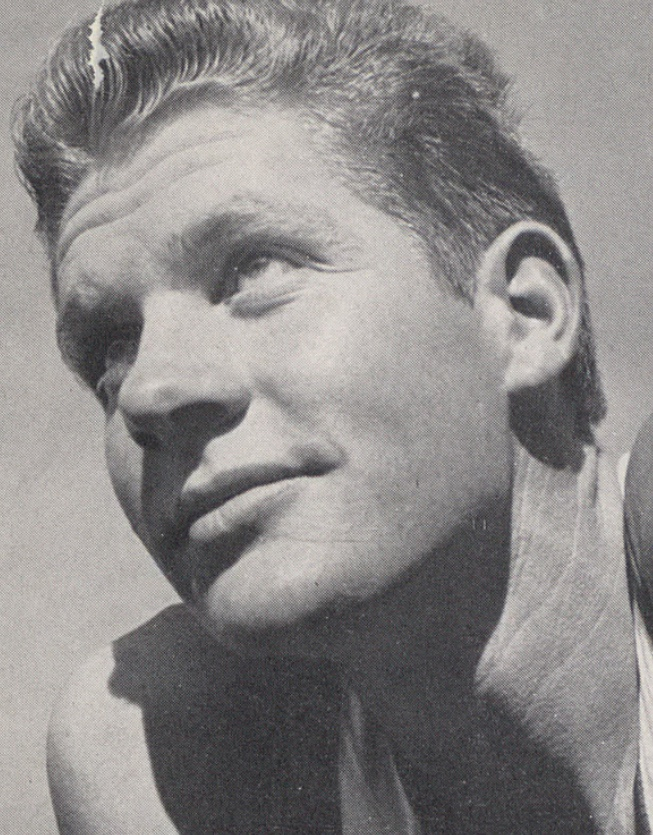
Vern Gardner

Utah Utes retired numbers
No.	Player	Pos.	Career
4	Andrew Bogut	C	2003–2005
12	Billy McGill	PF	1959–1962
22	Arnie Ferrin	SF	1943–1948
23	Danny Vranes	PF	1977–1981
24	Andre Miller	PG	1995–1999
33	Vern Gardner	PF	1945–1949
44	Keith Van Horn	PF	1993–1997

== See also ==
- List of teams with the most victories in NCAA Division I men's college basketball
