= California Baptist Lancers men's basketball statistical leaders =

The California Baptist Lancers men's basketball statistical leaders are individual statistical leaders of the California Baptist Lancers men's basketball program in various categories, including points, rebounds, assists, steals, and blocks. Within those areas, the lists identify single-game, single-season, and career leaders. The Lancers represent California Baptist University in the NCAA Division I Big West Conference.

California Baptist began competing in intercollegiate basketball in 1956. The NCAA did not officially record assists as a stat until the 1983–84 season, and blocks and steals until the 1985–86 season, but California Baptist's record books includes players in these stats before these seasons. These lists are updated through the end of the 2023–24 season.

== Scoring ==
Career
Rk	Player	Points	Seasons
1	Michael Smith	2,031	2013–14 2014–15 2015–16 2016–17
2	Dominique Daniels Jr.	1,737	2023–24 2024–25 2025–26
3	Warren Daniels	1,716	1989–90 1990–91 1991–92
4	Steve Deering	1,669	1973–74 1974–75 1975–76
5	Michael Banks	1,627	1986–87 1987–88 1988–89
6	Mark Roussin	1,540	2006–07 2007–08 2008–09
7	Steve Johnson	1,519	1973–74 1974–75 1975–76
8	Mike Bartee	1,510	1970–71 1971–72 1972–73
9	Jordan Heading	1,487	2015–16 2016–17 2017–18 2018–19
10	Jim Forkum	1,461	1965–66 1966–67 1967–68 1968–69

Season
Rk	Player	Points	Season
1	Dominique Daniels Jr.	766	2025–26
2	Michael Smith	726	2015–16
3	Dave Fitzgerald	709	1980–81
4	Michael Smith	696	2016–17
5	Ruben Hisquierdo	663	1962–63
6	Eric Dahl	650	1993–94
7	Kalidou Diouf	616	2017–18
8	Gelaun Wheelwright	611	2015–16
9	Terrance Johnson	606	2004–05
10	Jon Johnson	601	1992–93

Single game
Rk	Player	Points	Season	Opponent
1	Dominique Daniels Jr.	47	2025–26	Utah Valley
2	Ron Moreland	46	1970–71	Pacific Christian
	Bud Hjalmarson	46	1969–70	Life Bible

== Rebounds ==
Career
Rk	Player	Rebounds	Seasons
1	Steve Deering	1,024	1973–74 1974–75 1975–76
2	Kevin Finnerty	944	1973–74 1974–75 1975–76
3	De'jon Davis	876	2016–17 2017–18 2018–19 2019–20
4	Mike Vanta	829	1972–73 1973–74 1974–75
5	Mark Roussin	743	2006–07 2007–08 2008–09
6	Kalidou Diouf	693	2015–16 2016–17 2017–18
7	Auty Williams	679	1977–78 1978–79
8	Michael Smith	677	2013–14 2014–15 2015–16 2016–17
9	Luke Evans	674	2010–11 2011–12 2012–13
10	Mike Bartee	659	1970–71 1971–72 1972–73

Season
Rk	Player	Rebounds	Season
1	Clay Brown	399	1976–77
2	Kevin Finnerty	358	1975–76
3	Steve Deering	347	1975–76
4	Doug Howard	338	1973–74
5	Buddy Hjalmarson	319	1968–69
6	Joel Morgan	314	1972–73
7	Joel Morgan	313	1971–72
8	Dave Strother	309	1971–72
9	Dave Fitzgerald	308	1980–81
10	Kevin Finnerty	306	1974–75

Single game
Rk	Player	Rebounds	Season	Opponent
1	Lew Robinson	34	1962–63	

== Assists ==
Career
Rk	Player	Assists	Seasons
1	Steve Johnson	487	1973–74 1974–75 1975–76
2	Junior Denson	404	2005–06 2006–07
3	Ty Rowell	363	2017–18 2018–19 2019–20 2020–21 2021–22
4	Rick Bauer	359	1975–76 1976–77
5	Dan Martinez	354	1973–74 1974–75 1975–76
6	Eric Dahl	351	1993–94 1994–95
7	Jerry King	345	1969–70 1970–71 1971–72
8	Jordan Heading	340	2015–16 2016–17 2017–18 2018–19
9	Ray Johnson	339	1972–73 1973–74 1974–75
10	Pat Green	331	1984–85 1985–86

Season
Rk	Player	Assists	Season
1	Rick Bauer	243	1975–76
2	Ray Johnson	228	1972–73
3	Jerry King	216	1971–72
4	Carlos Ballesteros	186	1988–89
5	Pat Green	179	1985–86
6	Milan Acquaah	179	2019–20
7	Eric Dahl	178	1994–95
8	Dameon Brewington	177	2001–02
9	Dan Martinez	175	1973–74
10	Eric Dahl	173	1993–94

Single game
Rk	Player	Assists	Season	Opponent
1	Taran Armstrong	15	2001–02	

== Steals ==
Career
Rk	Player	Steals	Seasons
1	Mark Roussin	179	2006–07 2007–08 2008–09
	Junior Denson	179	2005–06 2006–07
3	Dennis Weaver	176	1996–97 1997–98
4	Tony Smith	171	1985–861986–87 1987–88 1988–89
5	Warren Daniels	163	1989–90 1990–91 1991–92
6	Chris Harvey	142	1997–98 1998–99 1999–00
7	Gary Gillman	140	1999–00 2000–01
8	Lance Williams	139	1990–91 1991–92
9	Khary Lands	133	2000–01 2001–02 2002–03 2003–04
10	Dameon Brewington	117	2000–01 2001–02

Season
Rk	Player	Steals	Season
1	Dennis Weaver	97	1996–97
2	Dennis Motley	91	1975–76
3	Buddy Rogers	85	1976–77
4	Rick Hurt	83	1997–98
5	Paul Bauer	79	1996–97
	Dennis Weaver	79	1997–98
7	Eric Dahl	78	1993–94
	Isamu Nichols	78	2000–01
	Gary Gillman	78	1999–00
10	Lance Williams	76	1991–92
	Desmen Granger	76	1998–99

== Blocks ==
Career
Rk	Player	Blocks	Seasons
1	Dennis Weaver	124	1996–97 1997–98
2	Kalidou Diouf	110	2015–16 2016–17 2017–18
3	Andrew Bruckner	108	2005–06 2006–07
4	Mark Roussin	106	2006–07 2007–08 2008–09
5	Zach Pirog	100	2018–19 2019–20
6	Luke Evans	83	2010–11 2011–12 2012–13
7	Kevin Crabb	64	2012–13 2013–14
8	Michael Banks	56	1986–87 1987–88 1988–89
9	Eric Nelson	53	2013–14 2014–15

Season
Rk	Player	Blocks	Season
1	Dennis Weaver	77	1996–97
2	Andrew Bruckner	60	2005–06
3	Zach Pirog	51	2018–19
4	Zach Pirog	49	2019–20
5	Andrew Bruckner	48	2006–07
6	Dennis Weaver	47	1997–98
7	Tim Ighoefe	41	2022–23
8	Mark Roussin	40	2007–08
9	Mark Roussin	39	2008–09
10	Kalidou Diouf	38	2017–18
