= 1994–95 Utah Utes men's basketball team =

American college basketball season

1994–95 Utah Utes men's basketball

WAC tournament champions WAC Regular season champions

NCAA tournament, second round
- Conference: Western Athletic Conference

Ranking
- Coaches: No. 22
- AP: No. 19
- Record: 28–6 (15–3 WAC)
- Head coach: Rick Majerus (6th season)
- Home arena: Jon M. Huntsman Center

1994–95 WAC men's basketball standings
	Conf.				Overall
Team	W		L	PCT	W		L	PCT
No. 19 Utah †	15	–	3	.833	28	–	6	.824
BYU	13	–	5	.722	22	–	10	.688
UTEP	13	–	5	.722	20	–	10	.667
Wyoming	9	–	9	.500	13	–	15	.464
New Mexico	9	–	9	.500	15	–	15	.500
Hawaii	8	–	10	.444	16	–	13	.552
Colorado State	7	–	11	.389	17	–	14	.548
Fresno State	7	–	11	.389	13	–	15	.464
San Diego State	5	–	13	.278	11	–	17	.393
Air Force	4	–	14	.222	8	–	20	.286
† 1995 WAC tournament winner Rankings from AP Poll

The 1994–95 Utah Utes men's basketball team represented the University of Utah as a member of the Western Athletic Conference during the 1994–95 men's basketball season. Led by head coach Rick Majerus, the Utes reached the Second Round of the NCAA tournament. The team finished with an overall record of 28–6 (15–3 WAC).

== Roster ==
1994–95 Utah Utes men's basketball team
Players
Coaches

Pos.	#	Name	Height	Weight	Year	Hometown
PG	10	Ted Cierzniak	6 ft 2 in (1.88 m)	195 lb (88 kg)	Jr	Lakewood, Colorado
SF	18	Brent Wieland	6 ft 8 in (2.03 m)	215 lb (98 kg)	So	Prosper, Texas
SF	29	Corey Trautner	6 ft 7 in (2.01 m)	230 lb (104 kg)	Jr	Millville, Utah
G	34	Drew Hansen	—	—	Fr
F	44	Keith Van Horn	6 ft 10 in (2.08 m)	235 lb (107 kg)	So	Diamond Bar, California
C	51	Michael Doleac	6 ft 11 in (2.11 m)	260 lb (118 kg)	Fr	Portland, Oregon

Head coach

- Rick Majerus (Marquette)

Assistant coach(es)

Legend

- (C) Team captain
- (S) Suspended
- (I) Ineligible
- (W) Walk-on
- Injured
- Current redshirt

== Schedule and results ==
Date time, TV	Rank^{#}	Opponent^{#}	Result	Record	Site city, state
Non-conference regular season
Nov 21, 1994*		vs. No. 11 Indiana; Maui Invitational tournament	W 77–72	1–0	Lahaina Civic Center; Lahaina, Hawaii
Nov 22, 1994*		vs. No. 7 Maryland; Maui Invitational Tournament	L 78–90	1–1	Lahaina Civic Center; Lahaina, Hawaii
Nov 23, 1994*		vs. No. 13 Michigan; Maui Invitational Tournament	L 69–73	1–2	Lahaina Civic Center; Lahaina, Hawaii
Mar 4, 1995		BYU	W 87–79	24–5 (15–3)	Jon M. Huntsman Center; Salt Lake City, Utah
WAC Tournament
Mar 9, 1995*	(1) No. 22	vs. (9) San Diego State; Quarterfinals	W 72–63	25–5	University Arena; Albuquerque, New Mexico
Mar 10, 1995*	(1) No. 22	at (5) New Mexico; Semifinals	W 86–50	26–5	University Arena; Albuquerque, New Mexico
Mar 11, 1995*	(1) No. 22	vs. (6) Hawaii; Championship	W 67–54	27–5	University Arena; Albuquerque, New Mexico
NCAA Tournament
Mar 17, 1995*	(4 W) No. 19	vs. (13 W) Long Beach State; First Round	W 76–64	28–5	Taco Bell Arena; Boise, Idaho
Mar 19, 1995*	(4 W) No. 19	vs. (5 W) No. 18 Mississippi State; Second Round	L 64–78	28–6	Taco Bell Arena; Boise, Idaho
*Non-conference game. ^{#}Rankings from AP Poll. (#) Tournament seedings in parentheses. W=West.

== Awards and honors ==
- Keith Van Horn – Honorable Mention AP All-American, WAC Player of the Year
