= Keith Van Horn =

American basketball player (born 1975)

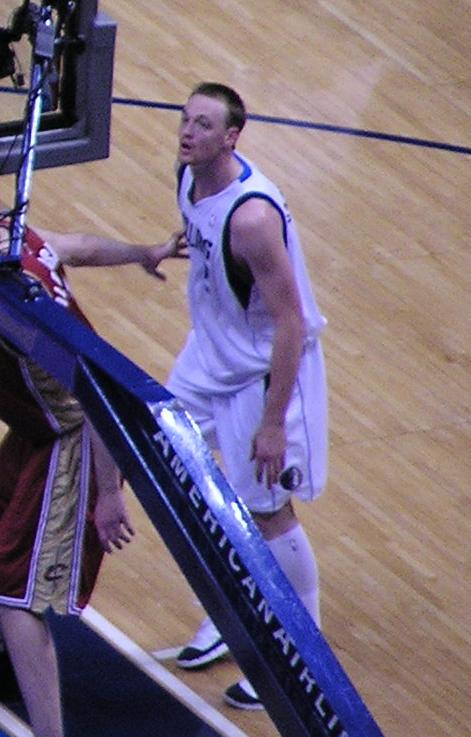
- Van Horn with the Dallas Mavericks in 2005

Personal information
- Born: October 23, 1975 (age 51) Fullerton, California, U.S.
- Listed height: 6 ft 10 in (2.08 m)
- Listed weight: 245 lb (111 kg)

Career information
- High school: Diamond Bar (Diamond Bar, California)
- College: Utah (1993–1997)
- NBA draft: 1997: 1st round, 2nd overall pick
- Drafted by: Philadelphia 76ers
- Playing career: 1997–2006
- Position: Power forward / small forward
- Number: 44, 4, 2

Career history
- 1997–2002: New Jersey Nets
- 2002–2003: Philadelphia 76ers
- 2003–2004: New York Knicks
- 2004–2005: Milwaukee Bucks
- 2005–2006: Dallas Mavericks

Career highlights
- NBA All-Rookie First Team (1998); Consensus first-team All-American (1997); Consensus second-team All-American (1996); 3× WAC Player of the Year (1995–1997); 2× WAC Tournament MVP (1995, 1997); 4× First-team All-WAC (1994–1997); WAC Rookie of the Year (1994); No. 44 retired by Utah Utes

Career NBA statistics
- Points: 9,206 (16.0 ppg)
- Rebounds: 3,909 (6.8 rpg)
- Assists: 900 (1.6 apg)
- Stats at NBA.com
- Stats at Basketball Reference

Keith Adam Van Horn (born October 23, 1975) is an American former professional basketball player. A forward, Van Horn played for five teams in a National Basketball Association (NBA) career that spanned from 1997 to 2006.

As a college basketball player, Van Horn played for the Utah Utes for four seasons. The Utes won the WAC Tournament twice and reached the NCAA Tournament three times during Van Horn's collegiate career. Van Horn was a consensus second-team All-American in 1996 and a consensus first-team All-American in 1997. As a senior in 1997, he was named ESPN Men's College Basketball Player of the Year. Van Horn finished his college basketball career with the Utes as the all-time leading scorer in the history of the Western Athletic Conference (WAC).

Van Horn was selected by the Philadelphia 76ers with the second pick in the 1997 NBA draft and was traded to the New Jersey Nets on draft night. He was named to the 1998 NBA All-Rookie Team. Van Horn played for the Nets from 1997 to 2002, leading the team in scoring in the 1997–98 and 1998–99 seasons and finishing fifth in the NBA in scoring with 21.8 points per game in the 1998–99 season. He was a member of the 2001–02 Nets team that made the NBA Finals. Van Horn would also go on to play for the 76ers, the New York Knicks, the Milwaukee Bucks, and the Dallas Mavericks. He averaged 16 points and nearly seven rebounds per game during his NBA career.

== Early life and college career ==
Van Horn was born on October 23, 1975. He is the son of Ken and May Van Horn. Van Horn was raised in Fullerton, California. He graduated from Diamond Bar High School in Diamond Bar, California and attended the University of Utah. Rick Majerus recruited him to replace departing star Josh Grant. He played for Utah from 1993 to 1997.

Van Horn's father died on January 24, 1994, during his first year at Utah. Nevertheless, Van Horn averaged a Utah-freshman record 18.3 points per game that season, along with 8.3 rebounds per game. He was also named WAC Rookie of the Year.

Van Horn was a member of two Utah teams that won the WAC tournament (one in 1995 and one in 1997). He was the conference tournament MVP in both seasons. Van Horn became known for his last-second heroics, making back-to-back game-winning shots against SMU and New Mexico in the 1997 WAC Conference Tournament. He helped the Utes reach the NCAA tournament in three consecutive seasons (1995, 1996, and 1997).

In 1997, Van Horn averaged 22.0 points and 9.5 rebounds per game to lead the Utes to a 29–4 finish and #2 national ranking, the highest in school history. The team advanced to the NCAA Tournament's Elite Eight. As a senior in 1997, he was named ESPN Men's College Player of the Year.

Van Horn was a consensus second-team All-American in 1996 and a consensus first-team All-American in 1997. He is the first player in WAC history to be named Player of the Year three times (1995, 1996, and 1997). He is the second player in WAC history to make first team all-WAC four years in a row and is the all-time leading scorer in University of Utah and WAC history with 2,542 points. Van Horn is the University of Utah career leader in points, defensive rebounds, three-point field goals made, free throw percentage and is second in total rebounds. He averaged 20.8 points and 8.8 rebounds per game in his collegiate career. His #44 basketball jersey was retired by the University of Utah in 1998. In February 2008, he was among 16 players named to the University of Utah's "All-Century" basketball team. Van Horn was inducted to Utah's Crimson Club Hall of Fame in 2012.

== Professional career ==
=== New Jersey Nets ===
A forward, Van Horn was drafted as the second overall pick in the 1997 NBA draft by the Philadelphia 76ers. However, his rights were immediately traded to the New Jersey Nets along with Michael Cage, Lucious Harris and Don MacLean in exchange for the draft rights to Tim Thomas and Anthony Parker and player contracts of Jim Jackson and Eric Montross.

Van Horn played for the Nets from 1997 to 2002. Initially, he was a star player for the team. He was named to NBA All-Rookie First Team in his first season, averaging a team-leading 19.7 points and 6.6 rebounds per game and leading the Nets to the 1998 NBA Playoffs, where they were swept in three games by the Chicago Bulls. His best season came in 1999, where he averaged 21.8 points per game (fifth in the NBA) as well as 8.5 rebounds per game. That season, on March 26, Van Horn blocked a career-high six shots, along with scoring 22 points, during a 100–91 loss to the Indiana Pacers.

Following the Nets' acquisition of point guard Jason Kidd in 2001, Van Horn's role on the team was reduced. He averaged 14.8 points per game in the 2001-2002 season, his lowest scoring average during his Nets tenure. Nevertheless, Van Horn led the team in rebounding and placed second in scoring that season. In the deciding Game Five of the Nets' first-round matchup with the Indiana Pacers, Van Horn scored 27 points in a 120–109 victory. The Nets reached the 2002 NBA Finals, where they were swept by the Los Angeles Lakers in four games. Van Horn was criticized for his performance and effort in the 2002 NBA Finals, in which he averaged 10.5 points per game and shot 38.6% from the floor.

=== Philadelphia 76ers ===
On August 6, 2002, Van Horn was traded to the Philadelphia 76ers (the team that had drafted him) along with Todd MacCulloch for center Dikembe Mutombo. He spent one year with the 76ers, placing second on the team in scoring (15.9 per game) and rebounding (7.1 per game). In the postseason, the 76ers advanced past the New Orleans Hornets in the first round before being eliminated by the Detroit Pistons in the Eastern Conference Semifinals.

=== New York Knicks and Milwaukee Bucks ===
After spending a year with the 76ers, Van Horn was traded to the New York Knicks for Latrell Sprewell in a four team deal that also included the Atlanta Hawks and Minnesota Timberwolves. His stint with the Knicks, although productive, was short; on February 16, 2004, he was traded to the Milwaukee Bucks in a three team trade involving the Atlanta Hawks, where he was traded for Tim Thomas, marking the second time Thomas and Van Horn were traded for each other. In the playoffs, however, Van Horn and the Bucks would be eliminated in the first round by the eventual-champion Pistons.

=== Dallas Mavericks ===
On February 24, 2005, to make salary cap room for the anticipated re-signing of free-agent-to-be Michael Redd in the coming off-season, the Bucks traded Van Horn to the Dallas Mavericks for the expiring contracts of Alan Henderson, Calvin Booth and cash. With the Mavericks, Van Horn played a sixth man role. He was a member of the Mavericks team that reached the 2006 NBA Finals, losing to the Miami Heat.

=== Free agency and retirement ===
Following the 2005–06 season, Van Horn stated that he was taking a year off from the NBA to spend time with his family. On February 19, 2008, Van Horn signed a three-year deal (only the first year guaranteed) with the Mavericks in order to help complete a blockbuster trade that sent Jason Kidd from the Nets to the Mavericks and Devin Harris to the Nets. Van Horn was included in the trade to "balance the trade from a salary standpoint". As expected, Van Horn did not play at all for the Nets and was waived on October 23, 2008, earning $4.3 million without playing.

Van Horn finished his NBA career with averages of 16.0 points per game and nearly seven rebounds per game. He earned $88 million in the NBA.

== Post-NBA endeavors ==
As of 2014, Van Horn ran the Colorado Premier Basketball Club, a non-profit youth basketball program involving around 1,000 kids from the Denver area. The club, claimed to be Colorado's largest basketball club, provides leagues, coaching, camps and tournaments for around 1,000 kids from the Denver area. As of 2025, Van Horne was managing partner at VHRE Properties.

== Personal life ==
Van Horn is married to his wife, Amy, and has four children.

== Career statistics ==
Legend
GP	Games played	GS	Games started	MPG	Minutes per game
FG%	Field goal percentage	3P%	3-point field goal percentage	FT%	Free throw percentage
RPG	Rebounds per game	APG	Assists per game	SPG	Steals per game
BPG	Blocks per game	PPG	Points per game	**Bold**	Career high

=== College ===
Year	Team	GP	GS	MPG	FG%	3P%	FT%	RPG	APG	SPG	BPG	PPG
1993–94	Utah	25	24	29.6	.516	**.443**	.775	8.3	.8	**.8**	**1.6**	18.3
1994–95	Utah	**33**	**33**	30.1	**.545**	.386	.856	8.5	**1.4**	**.8**	.8	21.0
1995–96	Utah	32	32	30.9	.538	.409	.851	8.8	1.0	.7	.7	21.4
1996–97	Utah	32	32	**31.5**	.492	.387	**.904**	**9.5**	**1.4**	.7	1.2	**22.0**
Career		122	121	30.6	.522	.401	.851	8.8	1.2	.7	1.0	20.8

=== Regular season ===
Year	Team	GP	GS	MPG	FG%	3P%	FT%	RPG	APG	SPG	BPG	PPG
1997–98	New Jersey	62	62	**37.5**	.426	.308	.846	6.6	1.7	1.0	.4	19.7
1998–99	New Jersey	42	42	**37.5**	.428	.302	.859	**8.5**	1.5	1.0	**1.3**	**21.8**
1999–00	New Jersey	80	80	34.8	.445	.368	.847	**8.5**	**2.0**	.8	.8	19.2
2000–01	New Jersey	49	47	35.4	.435	.382	.806	7.1	1.7	.8	.4	17.0
2001–02	New Jersey	**81**	**81**	30.4	.433	.345	.800	7.5	**2.0**	.8	.5	14.8
2002–03	Philadelphia	74	73	31.6	**.482**	.369	.804	7.1	1.3	.9	.4	15.9
2003–04	New York	47	47	33.5	.445	.373	.819	7.3	1.8	**1.1**	.4	16.4
2003–04	Milwaukee	25	15	30.6	.472	**.458**	**.945**	6.3	1.5	.6	.6	15.7
2004–05	Milwaukee	33	13	24.8	.449	.385	.862	5.0	1.2	.6	.3	10.4
2004–05	Dallas	29	3	23.6	.462	.375	.783	4.4	1.2	.5	.3	12.2
2005–06	Dallas	53	0	20.6	.424	.368	.832	3.6	.7	.6	.2	8.9
Career		575	463	31.6	.443	.361	.835	6.8	1.6	.8	.5	16.0

==== Playoffs ====
Year	Team	GP	GS	MPG	FG%	3P%	FT%	RPG	APG	SPG	BPG	PPG
1998	New Jersey	3	3	25.7	.448	.000	.800	3.0	.3	.0	.0	12.7
2002	New Jersey	**20**	**20**	32.2	.402	**.440**	.714	6.7	**2.1**	1.0	.5	**13.3**
2003	Philadelphia	12	12	**33.5**	.382	.438	.900	**7.5**	.8	.8	.2	10.4
2004	Milwaukee	5	2	27.4	.333	.364	.667	4.6	1.4	**1.4**	**.6**	8.0
2005	Dallas	3	0	11.0	**.467**	.000	.889	2.0	.3	.3	.0	7.3
2006	Dallas	14	3	12.3	.339	.286	**1.000**	2.3	.1	.0	.3	3.6
Career		57	40	25.7	.388	.391	.795	5.1	1.1	.6	.3	9.5

== See also ==
- List of NCAA Division I men's basketball players with 2,000 points and 1,000 rebounds
