= 1998–99 New Mexico Lobos men's basketball team =

American college basketball season

1998–99 New Mexico Lobos men's basketball

NCAA tournament, Second round
- Conference: Western Athletic Conference
- Pacific

Ranking
- AP: No. 25
- Record: 25–9 (9–5 WAC)
- Head coach: Dave Bliss (11th season)
- Home arena: University Arena

1998–99 WAC men's basketball standings
	Conf.				Overall
Team	W		L	PCT	W		L	PCT
Mountain
UNLV	9	–	5	.643	16	–	13	.552
Tulsa	9	–	5	.643	23	–	10	.697
Rice	8	–	6	.571	18	–	10	.643
TCU	7	–	7	.500	21	–	11	.656
SMU	7	–	7	.500	15	–	15	.500
Colorado State	7	–	7	.500	19	–	11	.633
Wyoming	7	–	7	.500	18	–	10	.643
Air Force	2	–	12	.143	10	–	16	.385
Pacific
No. 6 Utah †	14	–	0	1.000	28	–	5	.848
No. 25 New Mexico	9	–	5	.643	25	–	9	.735
Fresno State	9	–	5	.643	21	–	12	.636
UTEP	8	–	6	.571	16	–	12	.571
BYU	6	–	8	.429	12	–	16	.429
San Jose State	5	–	9	.357	12	–	16	.429
Hawaii	3	–	11	.214	6	–	20	.231
San Diego State	2	–	12	.143	4	–	22	.154
† 1999 WAC tournament winner Rankings from AP Poll

The 1998–99 New Mexico Lobos men's basketball team represented the University of New Mexico as a member of the Western Athletic Conference during the 1998–99 NCAA Division I men's basketball season. The Lobos were coached by head coach Dave Bliss and played their home games at the University Arena, also known as "The Pit", in Albuquerque, New Mexico. New Mexico finished 2nd in the WAC Pacific division regular season standings and lost to Utah in the WAC Tournament championship game. The Lobos received an at-large bid to the NCAA tournament as No. 9 seed in the West region. After defeating Missouri in the opening round, New Mexico was bounced in the round of 32 by No. 1 seed and eventual National champion Connecticut, 78–56, to finish with a 25–9 record (9–5 WAC).

== Roster ==
1998–99 New Mexico Lobos men's basketball team
Players
Coaches

Pos.	#	Name	Height	Weight	Year	Hometown
G	3	Lamont Long	6 ft 4 in (1.93 m)	—	Jr
F	4	Kenny Thomas	6 ft 7 in (2.01 m)	230 lb (104 kg)	Sr	Albuquerque, New Mexico

Head coach

- Dave Bliss

Assistant coach(es)

Legend

- (C) Team captain
- (S) Suspended
- (I) Ineligible
- (W) Walk-on
- Injured
- Current redshirt

== Schedule and results ==
Date time, TV	Rank^{#}	Opponent^{#}	Result	Record	Site (attendance) city, state
Regular season
Nov 13, 1998*	No. 20 т	DePaul	W 82–81	1–0	University Arena; Albuquerque, New Mexico
Nov 20, 1998*	No. 20	Simon Fraser	W 86–73	2–0	University Arena; Albuquerque, New Mexico
Nov 27, 1998*	No. 20	Cornell	W 88–75	3–0	University Arena; Albuquerque, New Mexico
Nov 28, 1998*	No. 20	Northeastern	W 93–61	4–0	University Arena; Albuquerque, New Mexico
Dec 2, 1998*	No. 17	Arkansas-Pine Bluff	W 97–72	5–0	University Arena; Albuquerque, New Mexico
Dec 8, 1998*	No. 12	Texas-Rio Grande Valley	W 101–94	6–0	University Arena; Albuquerque, New Mexico
Dec 19, 1998*	No. 11	Sacramento State	W 102–71	7–0	University Arena; Albuquerque, New Mexico
Dec 21, 1998*	No. 11	McNeese State	W 90–46	8–0	University Arena; Albuquerque, New Mexico
Dec 24, 1998*	No. 11	at Washington	L 61–70	8–1	Hec Edmundson Pavilion; Seattle, Washington
Dec 28, 1998*	No. 15	New Hampshire	W 93–67	9–1	University Arena; Albuquerque, New Mexico
Dec 29, 1998*	No. 15	Houston	W 84–69	10–1	University Arena; Albuquerque, New Mexico
Dec 31, 1998*	No. 15	Coppin State	W 67–61	11–1	University Arena; Albuquerque, New Mexico
Jan 2, 1999*	No. 15	New Mexico State	W 77–66	12–1	University Arena; Albuquerque, New Mexico
Jan 4, 1999	No. 15	at Fresno State	L 80–86	12–2 (0–1)	Selland Arena; Fresno, California
Jan 7, 1999	No. 15	San Diego State	W 90–60	13–2 (1–1)	University Arena; Albuquerque, New Mexico
Jan 9, 1999	No. 15	Hawaii	W 82–59	14–2 (2–1)	University Arena; Albuquerque, New Mexico
Jan 13, 1999	No. 16	at San Jose State	W 82–81 ^{OT}	15–2 (3–1)	The Event Center; San Jose, California
Jan 16, 1999*	No. 16	No. 7 Arizona	W 79–78	16–2	University Arena; Albuquerque, New Mexico
Jan 19, 1999*	No. 12	at New Mexico State	L 55–76	16–3	Pan American Center; Las Cruces, New Mexico
Jan 23, 1999	No. 12	at UTEP	L 49–67	16–4 (3–2)	Don Haskins Center; El Paso, Texas
Jan 30, 1999	No. 18	BYU	W 78–68	17–4 (4–2)	University Arena; Albuquerque, New Mexico
Feb 1, 1999	No. 17	No. 20 Utah	L 39–57	17–5 (4–3)	University Arena; Albuquerque, New Mexico
Feb 6, 1999	No. 17	at Hawaii	L 68–72 ^{OT}	17–6 (4–4)	Stan Sheriff Center; Honolulu, Hawaii
Feb 8, 1999	No. 25	at San Diego State	W 85–60	18–6 (5–4)	Viejas Arena; San Diego, California
Feb 11, 1999	No. 25	San Jose State	W 82–46	19–6 (6–4)	University Arena; Albuquerque, New Mexico
Feb 13, 1999	No. 24	Fresno State	W 83–81	20–6 (7–4)	University Arena; Albuquerque, New Mexico
Feb 20, 1999	No. 24	UTEP	W 81–65	21–6 (8–4)	University Arena; Albuquerque, New Mexico
Feb 25, 1999*	No. 21	at BYU	W 85–64	22–6 (9–4)	Marriott Center; Provo, Utah
Feb 27, 1999	No. 21	at No. 12 Utah	L 47–77	22–7 (9–5)	Jon M. Huntsman Center; Salt Lake City, Utah
WAC tournament
Mar 4, 1999*	No. 25	vs. Rice; Quarterfinals	W 51–49	23–7	Thomas & Mack Center; Las Vegas, Nevada
Mar 5, 1999*	No. 25	vs. SMU; Semifinals	W 57–56	24–7	Thomas & Mack Center; Las Vegas, Nevada
Mar 6, 1999*	No. 25	vs. No. 8 Utah; Championship game	L 45–60	24–8	Thomas & Mack Center; Las Vegas, Nevada
NCAA tournament
Mar 11, 1999*	(9 W) No. 25	vs. (8 W) Missouri; First Round	W 61–59	25–8	McNichols Sports Arena; Denver, Colorado
Mar 13, 1999*; CBS	(9 W) No. 25	vs. (1 W) No. 3 Connecticut; Second Round	L 56–78	25–9	McNichols Sports Arena (16,237); Denver, Colorado
*Non-conference game. ^{#}Rankings from AP poll. (#) Tournament seedings in parentheses. W=West.

== Team players in the 1999 NBA draft ==
Round	Pick	Player	NBA Club
1	22	Kenny Thomas	Houston Rockets
