= 1998–99 Tulsa Golden Hurricane men's basketball team =

American college basketball season

1998–99 Tulsa Golden Hurricane men's basketball

WAC Mountain co-champions

NCAA tournament, second round
- Conference: Western Athletic Conference
- Mountain
- Record: 23–10 (9–5 WAC)
- Head coach: Bill Self (2nd season)
- Assistant coaches: Norm Roberts (2nd season); Billy Gillispie (2nd season); John Phillips (2nd season)
- Home arena: Reynolds Center

1998–99 WAC men's basketball standings
	Conf.				Overall
Team	W		L	PCT	W		L	PCT
Mountain
UNLV	9	–	5	.643	16	–	13	.552
Tulsa	9	–	5	.643	23	–	10	.697
Rice	8	–	6	.571	18	–	10	.643
TCU	7	–	7	.500	21	–	11	.656
SMU	7	–	7	.500	15	–	15	.500
Colorado State	7	–	7	.500	19	–	11	.633
Wyoming	7	–	7	.500	18	–	10	.643
Air Force	2	–	12	.143	10	–	16	.385
Pacific
No. 6 Utah †	14	–	0	1.000	28	–	5	.848
No. 25 New Mexico	9	–	5	.643	25	–	9	.735
Fresno State	9	–	5	.643	21	–	12	.636
UTEP	8	–	6	.571	16	–	12	.571
BYU	6	–	8	.429	12	–	16	.429
San Jose State	5	–	9	.357	12	–	16	.429
Hawaii	3	–	11	.214	6	–	20	.231
San Diego State	2	–	12	.143	4	–	22	.154
† 1999 WAC tournament winner Rankings from AP Poll

The 1998–99 Tulsa Golden Hurricane men's basketball team represented the University of Tulsa as a member of the Western Athletic Conference in the 1998–99 college basketball season. The Golden Hurricane played their home games at the Reynolds Center. Led by second-year head coach Bill Self, they finished the season 23–10 overall and 9–5 in conference play to finish tied atop the WAC Mountain division standings. After losing in the semifinals of the 1999 WAC men's basketball tournament, the team an at-large bid to the NCAA tournament as No. 9 seed in the East region. The Golden Hurricane beat College of Charleston in the opening round before falling to No. 1 overall seed and eventual National runner-up Duke in the second round.

== Roster ==
1998–99 Tulsa Golden Hurricane men's basketball team
Players
Coaches

Pos.	#	Name	Height	Weight	Year	Hometown
G	10	Greg Harrington	6 ft 2 in (1.88 m)	—	Fr
F	11	Eric Coley	6 ft 5 in (1.96 m)	—	Jr
C	13	Brandon Kurtz	6 ft 10 in (2.08 m)	—	Jr
G	31	Marcus Hill	6 ft 5 in (1.96 m)	—	So
G	32	Tony Heard	6 ft 0 in (1.83 m)	—	Jr
F	33	David Shelton	6 ft 6 in (1.98 m)	—	So
F/C	51	Michael Ruffin	6 ft 9 in (2.06 m)	240 lb (109 kg)	Sr	Denver, Colorado
C	55	DeAngelo McDaniel	6 ft 9 in (2.06 m)	—	Fr

Head coach

Bill Self

Assistant coach(es)

- Norm Roberts
- Billy Gillispie

Legend

- (C) Team captain
- (S) Suspended
- (I) Ineligible
- (W) Walk-on
- Injured
- Current redshirt

== Schedule and results ==
Date time, TV	Rank^{#}	Opponent^{#}	Result	Record	Site (attendance) city, state
Regular Season
Nov 15, 1998*		Sam Houston State	W 60–42	1–0	Tulsa Convention Center (7,070); Tulsa, Oklahoma
Nov 18, 1998*		Jackson State	W 84–45	2–0	Tulsa Convention Center (6,854); Tulsa, Oklahoma
Nov 22, 1998*		at UAB	L 61–78	2–1	Bartow Arena (3,516); Birmingham, Alabama
Nov 24, 1998*		Texas–San Antonio	W 81–68	3–1	Tulsa Convention Center (6,874); Tulsa, Oklahoma
Nov 28, 1998*		Saint Joseph's	W 66–55	4–1	Tulsa Convention Center (7,379); Tulsa, Oklahoma
Dec 1, 1998*		at Nebraska	W 52–49	5–1	Bob Devaney Sports Center (6,598); Lincoln, Nebraska
Dec 4, 1998*		vs. Vermont	W 72–61	6–1	Bradley Center (13,228); Milwaukee, Wisconsin
Dec 5, 1998*		at Marquette	W 67–51	7–1	Bradley Center (12,205); Milwaukee, Wisconsin
Dec 8, 1998*		North Texas	W 103–69	8–1	Tulsa Convention Center (7,049); Tulsa, Oklahoma
Dec 13, 1998*		Oral Roberts	W 73–68	9–1	Tulsa Convention Center (8,654); Tulsa, Oklahoma
Dec 21, 1998*		vs. Texas Tech; Pearl Harbor Classic	W 84–50	10–1	George Q. Cannon Activities Center (603); Laie, Hawaii
Dec 22, 1998*		vs. No. 15 Michigan State; Pearl Harbor Classic	L 58–68	10–2	George Q. Cannon Activities Center (482); Laie, Hawaii
Dec 23, 1998*		vs. Oregon State; Pearl Harbor Classic	W 59–57	11–2	George Q. Cannon Activities Center (632); Laie, Hawaii
WAC Tournament
Mar 4, 1999*		vs. Fresno State; Quarterfinals	W 85–56	22–8	Thomas & Mack Center (8,973); Las Vegas, Nevada
Mar 5, 1999*		vs. No. 8 Utah; Semifinals	L 61–64 ^{OT}	22–9	Thomas & Mack Center (10,858); Las Vegas, Nevada
NCAA Tournament
Mar 12, 1999*	(9 E)	vs. (8 E) No. 16 College of Charleston; First Round	W 62–53	23–9	Charlotte Coliseum (19,872); Charlotte, North Carolina
Mar 14, 1999*	(9 E)	vs. (1 E) No. 1 Duke; Second Round	L 56–97	23–10	Charlotte Coliseum (20,172); Charlotte, North Carolina
*Non-conference game. ^{#}Rankings from AP Poll. (#) Tournament seedings in parentheses. E=East. All times are in Central.

== Awards and honors ==
- Bill Self – WAC Coach of the Year
