= 1994–95 BYU Cougars men's basketball team =

American college basketball season

1994–95 BYU Cougars men's basketball

NCAA tournament, First round
- Conference: Western Athletic Conference
- Record: 22–10 (13–5 WAC)
- Head coach: Roger Reid (6th season)
- Home arena: Marriott Center

1994–95 WAC men's basketball standings
	Conf.				Overall
Team	W		L	PCT	W		L	PCT
No. 19 Utah †	15	–	3	.833	28	–	6	.824
BYU	13	–	5	.722	22	–	10	.688
UTEP	13	–	5	.722	20	–	10	.667
Wyoming	9	–	9	.500	13	–	15	.464
New Mexico	9	–	9	.500	15	–	15	.500
Hawaii	8	–	10	.444	16	–	13	.552
Colorado State	7	–	11	.389	17	–	14	.548
Fresno State	7	–	11	.389	13	–	15	.464
San Diego State	5	–	13	.278	11	–	17	.393
Air Force	4	–	14	.222	8	–	20	.286
† 1995 WAC tournament winner Rankings from AP Poll

The 1994–95 BYU Cougars men's basketball team represented Brigham Young University in the 1994–95 basketball season. Led by head coach Roger Reid, the Cougars finished second in the WAC regular season standings, and made their third tournament appearance under Reid. In the NCAA tournament, the Cougars, playing as the No. 8 seed in the Southeast region, were defeated by No. 9 seed Tulane to finish with an overall record of 22–10 (13–5 WAC).

== Roster ==
1994–95 BYU Cougars men's basketball team
Players	Coaches
Pos. / # / Name / Height / Weight / Year / Hometown; C / / Russell Larson / 6 ft 11 in (2.11 m) / 235 lb (107 kg) / Sr	Head coach: Roger Reid; Assistant coach(es) Legend: (C) Team captain; (S) Suspended; (I) Ineligible; (W) Walk-on; Injured; Current redshirt

== Schedule and results ==
Date time, TV	Rank^{#}	Opponent^{#}	Result	Record	Site city, state
Regular season
Nov 23, 1994*		vs. No. 19 Oklahoma State; Great Alaska Shootout	W 69–59	1–0	Sullivan Arena; Anchorage, Alaska
Nov 25, 1994*		vs. Louisville; Great Alaska Shootout	W 75–60	2–0	Sullivan Arena; Anchorage, Alaska
Nov 26, 1994*		vs. Minnesota; Great Alaska Shootout	L 74–79	2–1	Sullivan Arena; Anchorage, Alaska
WAC Tournament
Mar 9, 1995*	(2)	vs. (7) Colorado State; Quarterfinals	L 73–75	22–9	University Arena; Albuquerque, New Mexico
NCAA Tournament
Mar 16, 1995*	(8 SE)	vs. (9 SE) Tulane; First round	L 70–76	22–10	Pyramid Arena; Memphis, Tennessee
*Non-conference game. ^{#}Rankings from AP poll. (#) Tournament seedings in parentheses. SE=Southeast.
