= 1998–99 Utah Utes men's basketball team =

American college basketball season

1998–99 Utah Utes men's basketball

WAC Regular Season Champions WAC Tournament Champions

NCAA tournament, second round
- Conference: Western Athletic Conference

Ranking
- Coaches: No. 10
- AP: No. 6
- Record: 28–5 (14–0 WAC)
- Head coach: Rick Majerus (10th season)
- Home arena: Jon M. Huntsman Center

1998–99 WAC men's basketball standings
	Conf.				Overall
Team	W		L	PCT	W		L	PCT
Mountain
UNLV	9	–	5	.643	16	–	13	.552
Tulsa	9	–	5	.643	23	–	10	.697
Rice	8	–	6	.571	18	–	10	.643
TCU	7	–	7	.500	21	–	11	.656
SMU	7	–	7	.500	15	–	15	.500
Colorado State	7	–	7	.500	19	–	11	.633
Wyoming	7	–	7	.500	18	–	10	.643
Air Force	2	–	12	.143	10	–	16	.385
Pacific
No. 6 Utah †	14	–	0	1.000	28	–	5	.848
No. 25 New Mexico	9	–	5	.643	25	–	9	.735
Fresno State	9	–	5	.643	21	–	12	.636
UTEP	8	–	6	.571	16	–	12	.571
BYU	6	–	8	.429	12	–	16	.429
San Jose State	5	–	9	.357	12	–	16	.429
Hawaii	3	–	11	.214	6	–	20	.231
San Diego State	2	–	12	.143	4	–	22	.154
† 1999 WAC tournament winner Rankings from AP Poll

The 1998–99 Utah Utes men's basketball team represented the University of Utah as a member of the Western Athletic Conference during the 1998–99 men's basketball season. Led by head coach Rick Majerus, the Utes finished with an overall record of 28–5 (14–0 WAC).

Utah capped an impressive three-season stretch by winning 87 of 100 games overall and 41 of 44 games in conference play.

== Roster ==
1998–99 Utah Utes men's basketball team
Players
Coaches

Pos.	#	Name	Height	Weight	Year	Hometown
PG	4	Isaac Taylor	6 ft 3 in (1.91 m)	200 lb (91 kg)	Fr	Arlington, Texas
F/C	13	Hanno Möttölä	6 ft 10 in (2.08 m)	250 lb (113 kg)	Jr	Helsinki, Finland
SG	15	Derek Broomhall	6 ft 5 in (1.96 m)	210 lb (95 kg)	Sr	Sacramento, California
SG	21	Trace Caton	6 ft 4 in (1.93 m)	211 lb (96 kg)	So	Alamosa, Colorado
PG	24	Andre Miller	6 ft 3 in (1.91 m)	200 lb (91 kg)	Sr	Los Angeles, California
C	28	Tyson Johnston	7 ft 0 in (2.13 m)	253 lb (115 kg)	Fr	Steamboat Springs, Colorado
F	31	Britton Johnsen	6 ft 10 in (2.08 m)	240 lb (109 kg)	So	Murray, Utah
G	35	Jeff Johnsen	6 ft 4 in (1.93 m)	200 lb (91 kg)	Jr	Murray, Utah
F/C	40	Phil Cullen	6 ft 9 in (2.06 m)	215 lb (98 kg)	Fr	Chelan, Washington
F	50	Alex Jensen	6 ft 7 in (2.01 m)	225 lb (102 kg)	Jr	Bountiful, Utah

Head coach

- Rick Majerus (Marquette)

Assistant coach(es)

Legend

- (C) Team captain
- (S) Suspended
- (I) Ineligible
- (W) Walk-on
- Injured
- Current redshirt

== Schedule and results ==
Date time, TV	Rank^{#}	Opponent^{#}	Result	Record	Site city, state
Regular season
Nov 14, 1998*	No. 10	Azusa Pacific	W 76–47	1–0	Jon M. Huntsman Center; Salt Lake City, UT
Nov 18, 1998*	No. 9	at Utah State	L 54–62	1–1	Dee Glen Smith Spectrum; Logan, UT
Nov 23, 1998*	No. 9	vs. Arizona State; Maui Invitational	W 65–48	2–1	Lahaina Civic Center; Maui, HI
Nov 24, 1998*	No. 18	vs. No. 17 Indiana; Maui Invitational	L 49–52	2–2	Lahaina Civic Center; Maui, HI
Nov 25, 1998*	No. 18	vs. Michigan; Maui Invitational	W 71–54	3–2	Lahaina Civic Center; Maui, HI
Dec 2, 1998*	No. 21	vs. Rhode Island	L 63–70	3–3	United Center; Chicago, IL
Dec 5, 1998*	No. 21	at Long Beach State	W 61–54	4–3	The Long Beach Pyramid; Long Beach, CA
Dec 9, 1998*	No. 25	Weber State	W 87–74	5–3	Jon M. Huntsman Center; Salt Lake City, UT
Dec 12, 1998*	No. 25	at Texas	L 68–73	5–4	Frank Erwin Center; Austin, TX
Dec 19, 1998*		Loyola Marymount	W 89–55	6–4	Jon M. Huntsman Center; Salt Lake City, UT
Jan 30, 1999		at UTEP	W 64–54	16–4 (6–0)	Don Haskins Center; El Paso, TX
Feb 1, 1999	No. 20	at No. 17 New Mexico	W 57–39	17–4 (7–0)	University Arena; Albuquerque, NM
Feb 6, 1999	No. 20	at BYU	W 71–46	18–4 (8–0)	Marriott Center; Provo, UT
Feb 11, 1999	No. 14	San Diego State	W 86–38	19–4 (9–0)	Jon M. Huntsman Center; Salt Lake City, UT
Feb 13, 1999	No. 14	Hawaii	W 82–55	20–4 (10–0)	Jon M. Huntsman Center; Salt Lake City, UT
Feb 18, 1999	No. 12	at San Jose State	W 71–49	21–4 (11–0)	The Event Center; San Jose, CA
Feb 20, 1999	No. 12	at Fresno State	W 88–82	22–4 (12–0)	Selland Arena; Fresno, CA
Feb 25, 1999	No. 12	UTEP	W 75–70	23–4 (13–0)	Jon M. Huntsman Center; Salt Lake City, UT
Feb 27, 1999	No. 12	No. 21 New Mexico	W 77–47	24–4 (14–0)	Jon M. Huntsman Center; Salt Lake City, UT
WAC Tournament
Mar 4, 1999*	(P1) No. 8	vs. (P5) BYU; WAC Tournament Quarterfinal	W 81–62	25–4	Thomas & Mack Center; Las Vegas, NV
Mar 5, 1999*	(P1) No. 8	vs. (M2) Tulsa; WAC Tournament Semifinal	W 64–61 ^{OT}	26–4	Thomas & Mack Center; Las Vegas, NV
Mar 6, 1999*	(P1) No. 8	vs. (P2) No. 25 New Mexico; WAC Tournament Championship	W 60–45	27–4	Thomas & Mack Center; Las Vegas, NV
NCAA Tournament
Mar 12, 1999*	(2) No. 6	vs. (15) Arkansas State; First Round	W 80–58	28–4	Louisiana Superdome; New Orleans, LA
Mar 14, 1999*	(2) No. 6	vs. (10) Miami (OH); Second Round	L 58–66	28–5	Louisiana Superdome; New Orleans, LA
*Non-conference game. ^{#}Rankings from AP Poll. (#) Tournament seedings in parentheses. W=West.

== Team players in the 1999 NBA draft ==
Round	Pick	Player	NBA Club
1	8	Andre Miller	Cleveland Cavaliers
