= 1995 WAC men's basketball tournament =

- Classification: Division I
- Season: 1994–95
- Teams: 10
- Site: The Pit; Albuquerque, NM
- Champions: Utah (1st title)
- Winning coach: Rick Majerus (1st title)
- MVP: Keith Van Horn (Utah)

1994–95 WAC men's basketball standings
	Conf.				Overall
Team	W		L	PCT	W		L	PCT
No. 19 Utah †	15	–	3	.833	28	–	6	.824
BYU	13	–	5	.722	22	–	10	.688
UTEP	13	–	5	.722	20	–	10	.667
Wyoming	9	–	9	.500	13	–	15	.464
New Mexico	9	–	9	.500	15	–	15	.500
Hawaii	8	–	10	.444	16	–	13	.552
Colorado State	7	–	11	.389	17	–	14	.548
Fresno State	7	–	11	.389	13	–	15	.464
San Diego State	5	–	13	.278	11	–	17	.393
Air Force	4	–	14	.222	8	–	20	.286
† 1995 WAC tournament winner Rankings from AP Poll

The 1995 Western Athletic Conference men's basketball tournament was held March 8–11 at The Pit at the University of New Mexico in Albuquerque, New Mexico.

Top-seeded Utah defeated defending champions Hawaii in the championship game, 67–54, to clinch their first WAC men's tournament championship.

The Utes, in turn, received an automatic bid to the 1995 NCAA tournament. They were joined in the tournament by BYU, who received an at-large bid to the tournament.

== Format ==
No changes were made to the tournament format from the previous year. The top six teams received byes into the quarterfinal round, leaving the lowest four-seeded teams to play in the first round. Teams were seeded based on regular season conference records.

== Bracket ==
First round Wednesday, March 8
9	San Diego State	71
8	Fresno State	57
7	Colorado State	84
10	Air Force	75

Quarterfinals; Thursday, March 9
1	#22 Utah	72
9	San Diego State	63
5	New Mexico	63
4	Wyoming	56
3	UTEP	65
6	Hawaii	66
7	Colorado State	75
2	BYU	73

Semifinals; Friday, March 10
1	#22 Utah	86
5	New Mexico	50
6	Hawaii	66
7	Colorado State	64

Championship; Saturday, March 11
1	#22 Utah	67
6	Hawaii	54
