= Timo Saarelainen =

Finnish basketball player (born 1960)

Personal information
- Born: August 23, 1960 (age 66) Helsinki, Finland
- Listed height: 6 ft 6 in (1.98 m)
- Listed weight: 210 lb (95 kg)

Career information
- High school: PHYK - Pohjois-Haagan Yhteiskoulu
- College: BYU (1980–1985)
- NBA draft: 1985: 5th round, 115th overall pick
- Drafted by: Los Angeles Lakers
- Position: Small forward
- Number: 33

Career history
- 1976–1980, 1983–1986: Helsingin NMKY

Career highlights
- Finnish League champion (1983); WAC Player of the Year (1985); First-team All-WAC (1985); AP honorable mention All-American (1985)
- Stats at Basketball Reference

Timo Saarelainen (born August 23, 1960) is a retired Finnish basketball player. He was a member of the Finnish national basketball team for seven years and was a star college player at Brigham Young University (BYU) in the United States.

Saarelainen, a 6'6" small forward from Helsinki, played for Finland's national teams from 1978 to 1984, competing for Finland in the qualifying tournaments for the 1980 and 1984 Olympics. He was Finland's leading scorer for four years. He came to the United States in 1980 to pursue his degree at BYU. While there he went to two NCAA tournaments and as a senior in 1985 was named the Western Athletic Conference player of the year. That season he averaged 22 points and 4.5 rebounds per game for the Cougars. For his BYU career, Saarelainen scored 932 points in 100 games.

Following his BYU career, Saarelainen was selected in the fifth round of the 1985 NBA draft by the Los Angeles Lakers, but did not play in the league. Saarelainen played six seasons for Helsingin NMKY of Korisliiga, Finland's top professional league.
