= Gary Wilkinson (basketball) =

American basketball player (born 1982)

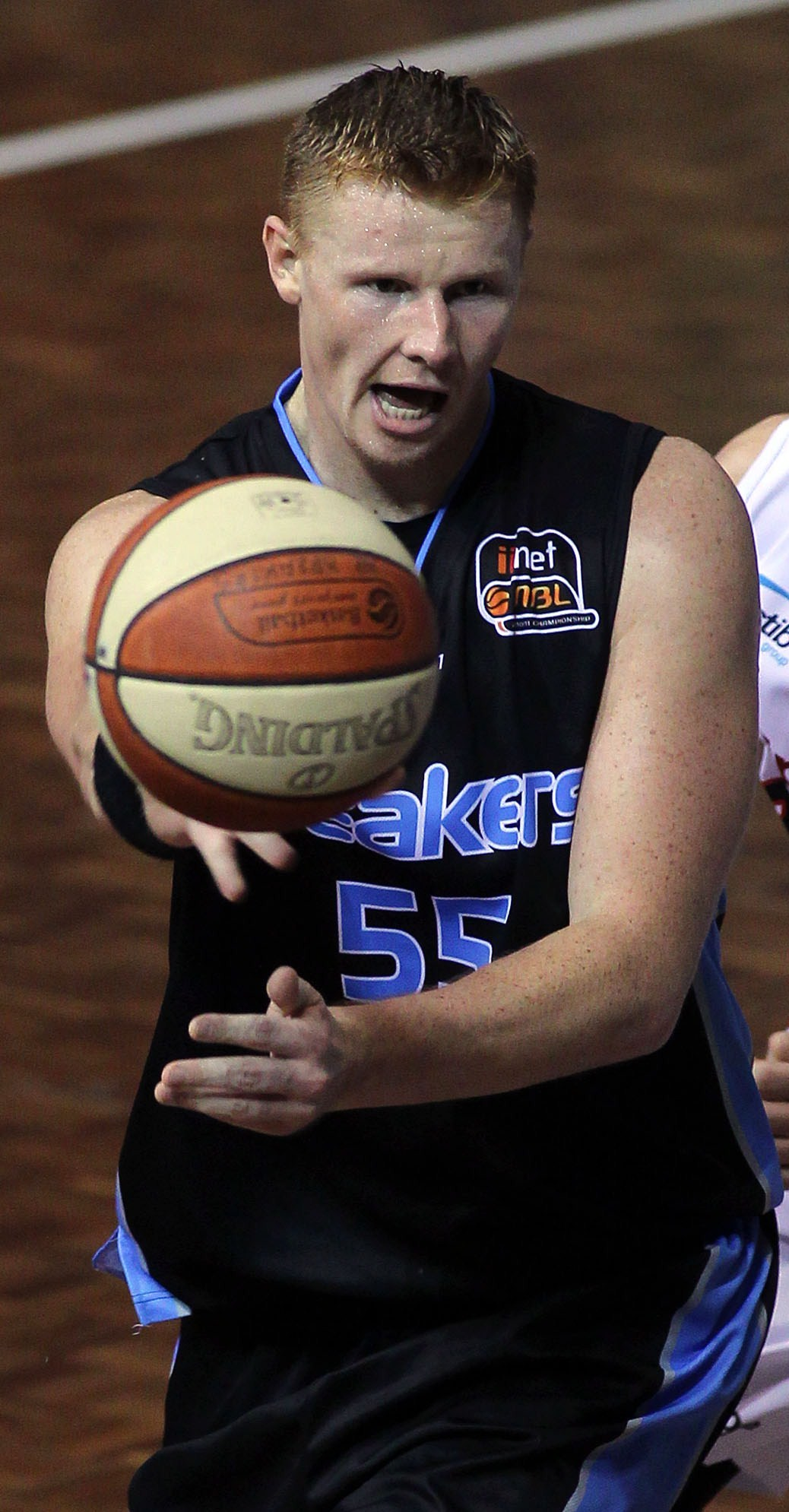
- Wilkinson with the New Zealand Breakers in 2011

Personal information
- Born: October 2, 1982 (age 44) Salt Lake City, Utah, U.S.
- Listed height: 6 ft 9 in (2.06 m)
- Listed weight: 249 lb (113 kg)

Career information
- High school: Bingham (South Jordan, Utah)
- College: Salt Lake CC (2005–2007); Utah State (2007–2009)
- NBA draft: 2009: undrafted
- Playing career: 2009–2014
- Position: Power forward / center
- Number: 55

Career history
- 2009: Wonju Dongbu Promy
- 2009–2010: Peristeri B.C.
- 2010–2012: New Zealand Breakers
- 2012: Vaqueros de Bayamón
- 2012–2013: BC Kalev/Cramo
- 2013: Indios de Mayagüez
- 2013–2014: New Zealand Breakers
- 2014: Indios de Mayagüez
- 2014: Vaqueros de Bayamón

Career highlights
- KML champion (2013); KML MVP (2013); 2x NBL champion (2011–2012); All-NBL First Team (2011); WAC Player of the Year (2009); First-team All-WAC (2009); Second-team All-WAC (2008); WAC All-Newcomer Team (2008); Third-team NJCAA All-American (2006); 2x First-team All-SWAC (2006–2007)

Gary Kristopher Wilkinson (born October 2, 1982) is an American retired professional basketball player. He played college basketball at Utah State and has played previously for professional teams in Greece, South Korea, New Zealand, Estonia and Puerto Rico.

== Early life ==
Wilkinson was born in Salt Lake City and grew up in South Jordan, Utah. At Bingham High School, Wilkinson was cut from the basketball team and dropped out his senior year; he told ESPN The Magazine: "I really didn't have any goals. I didn't have any ambition to play college basketball, didn't have any ambition to go to the Utah State university at all. I just sat around and partied with my friends." One of Wilkinson's friends committed suicide eight months after Wilkinson quit school; a friend of that friend recommended the Church of Jesus Christ of Latter-day Saints for Wilkinson. Eventually, Wilkinson earned his GED, went on a two-year mission in Alberta, Canada, and enrolled in Salt Lake Community College. Recalling his missionary work in Canada, Wilkinson said in an interview with the New Zealand Herald: "Sometimes it was so cold I actually couldn't speak because my jaw was frozen. We had to write with pencils as the ink in the pens would freeze." Wilkinson now shares his life story with youth groups and schools.

== College career ==
=== Salt Lake Community College ===
For two seasons (2005–2007), Wilkinson played for the Salt Lake Community College basketball team. He averaged 18.5 points and 8.1 rebounds per game and shot 60.2 percent from the field and 74.2 percent from the free throw line. Coach Norm Parrish was skeptical at first after Wilkinson called him for a tryout but was impressed enough to invite Wilkinson to the team. Wilkinson's awards during his time at SLCC include the Scenic West Athletic Conference First Team (2006, 2007) and NJCAA All-American Third Team in 2006. With a 3.96 grade point average, he also was on the NJCAA Academic All-American Team after his first season.

=== Utah State ===
Wilkinson played for the Utah State Aggies from 2007 to 2009. His first season, he scored an average 13.3 points per game and shot 58.4 percent from the field and made 81.5 percent of his free throws along with 7.0 rebounds per game. As a senior, and the only senior in his team, Wilkinson averaged 17.3 points and 7.3 rebounds per game. Utah State won the WAC men's basketball tournament in 2009 after beating Nevada 72–62. For that game, Wilkinson scored 21 points. However, in the first round of the NCAA Men's Division I Basketball Championship, Utah State lost to Marquette 58–57. Wilkinson scored 15 points and made four rebounds and missed a three-pointer when Utah State was trailing 57–54.

Wilkinson graduated from Utah State in 2009 with a summa cum laude degree in sociology and was Sociology Outstanding Student of the Year. In August 2009, Wilkinson became the first Utah State student-athlete to win the Stan Bates Award for top academic achievement. He was also Western Athletic Conference Men's Basketball Player of the Year for 2009.

Scott Powers, in a profile of Wilkinson for ESPN The Magazine, commented: "...the fact he's 26-years-old, dropped out of high school after never playing basketball there, found God, spent two years in Canada on a mission, is married and is the lone senior on the 25–2 nationally ranked Aggies is what really separates him from every other elite college basketball player."

== Professional career ==
In July 2009, Wilkinson signed with the Korean Basketball League team Wonju Dongbu Promy. He averaged 15.9 minutes, 9.2 points, and 4.1 rebounds per game, and Dongbu cut Wilkinson in November 2009. Wilkinson signed with the Greek team Peristeri BC; among his teammates at Peristeri was former Utah State player Spencer Nelson.

The Australasian National Basketball League team New Zealand Breakers signed Wilkinson in August 2010. With the Breakers, Wilkinson scored in double-digit figures for 13 straight games by February 2011 and played the most minutes overall.

Wilkinson was named Player of the Month for January 2011, averaging 20.3 points per game, shooting the ball at 61% from the field and 42% from the perimeter. He also made 82% of his freethrows and averaged 8.0 rebounds per game, and was later named to the All-NBL First Team (alongside teammate Kirk Penney). With a 71–53 victory over the Cairns Taipans in the third game of the NBL Grand Final on April 29, 2011, the Breakers became the NBL champions of the 2010–11 season. Wilkinson scored 13 points and made six rebounds.

On August 2, 2011, Wilkinson re-signed with the Breakers on a one-year deal.

On May 6, 2012, Wilkinson played his first game in Puerto Rico for the Vaqueros de Bayamón. Later that year, he signed with BC Kalev/Cramo of Estonia for the 2012–13 season. He then joined Indios de Mayagüez for the 2013 BSN season.

On October 28, 2013, Wilkinson re-signed with the New Zealand Breakers for the remainder of the 2013–14 season after the Breakers started the season 1–3. Following the conclusion of the NBL season, he re-joined Indios de Mayagüez for the 2014 BSN season.

== Personal life ==
In June 2006, Wilkinson married Utah State volleyball player Jessica Petersen. They have two children, son Jordan (born 2011) and daughter Eva (born 2013).

During his professional basketball career, Wilkinson lived in Logan, Utah for off-seasons. In 2014, Wilkinson retired from basketball and enrolled at the S.J. Quinney College of Law at the University of Utah. In 2016, he joined the Salt Lake City office of the law firm Snell & Wilmer as a summer associate and was also on the junior staff of the Utah Law Review.
