= 1999 WAC men's basketball tournament =

Men's basketball tournament

- Classification: Division I
- Season: 1998–99
- Teams: 12
- Site: Thomas & Mack Center; Paradise, NV
- Champions: Utah (3rd title)
- Winning coach: Rick Majerus (3rd title)
- MVP: Alex Jensen (Utah)

1998–99 WAC men's basketball standings
	Conf.				Overall
Team	W		L	PCT	W		L	PCT
Mountain
UNLV	9	–	5	.643	16	–	13	.552
Tulsa	9	–	5	.643	23	–	10	.697
Rice	8	–	6	.571	18	–	10	.643
TCU	7	–	7	.500	21	–	11	.656
SMU	7	–	7	.500	15	–	15	.500
Colorado State	7	–	7	.500	19	–	11	.633
Wyoming	7	–	7	.500	18	–	10	.643
Air Force	2	–	12	.143	10	–	16	.385
Pacific
No. 6 Utah †	14	–	0	1.000	28	–	5	.848
No. 25 New Mexico	9	–	5	.643	25	–	9	.735
Fresno State	9	–	5	.643	21	–	12	.636
UTEP	8	–	6	.571	16	–	12	.571
BYU	6	–	8	.429	12	–	16	.429
San Jose State	5	–	9	.357	12	–	16	.429
Hawaii	3	–	11	.214	6	–	20	.231
San Diego State	2	–	12	.143	4	–	22	.154
† 1999 WAC tournament winner Rankings from AP Poll

The 1999 Western Athletic Conference men's basketball tournament was held March 2–6 at the Thomas & Mack Center at the University of Nevada, Las Vegas in Paradise, Nevada. This was the final tournament before the formation of the Mountain West Conference.

Top-seeded Utah defeated New Mexico in the championship game, 60–45, to clinch their third WAC men's tournament championship.

The Utes, in turn, received an automatic bid to the 1999 NCAA tournament. They were joined in the tournament by two other WAC members, New Mexico and Tulsa, who all earned at-large bids.

== Format ==
No changes were made to the tournament format from the 1997 or 1998 tournaments. Teams were again seeded based on their position within either the Mountain or Pacific Division (top six teams only).

== Bracket ==
First round Tuesday, March 2
P4	UTEP	64
M5	SMU	65
M3	Rice	64
P6	San Jose State	61
P3	Fresno State	80
M6	Colorado State	59
M4	TCU	74
P5	BYU	90

Quarterfinals; Thursday, March 4
M1	UNLV	70
M5	SMU	71
M3	Rice	49
P2	#25 New Mexico	51
M2	Tulsa	85
P3	Fresno State	56
P5	BYU	62
P1	#8 Utah	81

Semifinals; Friday, March 5
M5	SMU	56
P2	#25 New Mexico	57
M2	Tulsa	61
P1	#8 Utah	64

Championship; Saturday, March 6
P2	#25 New Mexico	45
P1	#8 Utah	60
