= Dominique Daniels Jr. =

American basketball player (born 2002)

No. 11 – Laketown Squadron
- Position: Point guard
- League: NBA G League

Personal information
- Born: October 24, 2002 (age 24) Torrance, California, U.S.
- Listed height: 5 ft 10 in (1.78 m)
- Listed weight: 180 lb (82 kg)

Career information
- High school: Heritage (Menifee, California); Eleanor Roosevelt (Eastvale, California); Trinity International (Las Vegas, Nevada)
- College: San Bernardino Valley (2021–2023); California Baptist (2023–2026)
- NBA draft: 2026: undrafted
- Playing career: 2026–present

Career history
- 2026–present: Laketown Squadron

Career highlights
- WAC Player of the Year (2026); 2× First-team All-WAC (2025, 2026); Second-team All-WAC (2024); WAC tournament MVP (2026)
- Stats at Basketball Reference

Dominique Daniels Jr. (born October 24, 2002) is an American basketball player for the Laketown Squadron of the NBA G League. He played college basketball for the San Bernardino Valley Wolverines and California Baptist Lancers.

== Amateur career ==
A point guard born in Torrance, California and raised in Compton, Daniels attended Herotage High School and Eleanor Roosevelt High School in California before finishing his prep career at Trinity International School in Las Vegas. Daniels did not receive any NCAA Division I scholarship offers upon graduation.

At the close of his final season, Daniels averaged 23.2 points and 3.2 assists per game and was named the WAC Player of the Year. Daniels then led the Lancers to a WAC tournament championship, earning the school's first Division I NCAA tournament berth. Daniels was named tournament MVP. In his three-year CBU career, Daniels set Division I program records for season scoring (766 points), overall single-game scoring (47 points in overtime) and single-game scoring in regulation (41 points in the WAC tournament).

== Professional career ==
On September 21, 2026, Daniels was signed by the New Orleans Pelicans, only to be waived the same day. He started the 2026–27 NBA G League season with the Laketown Squadron.
