= Milan Acquaah =

American basketball player

No. 25 – London Lightning
- Position: Point guard
- League: BSL

Personal information
- Born: December 22, 1997 (age 28) Bakersfield, California
- Listed height: 6 ft 3 in (1.91 m)
- Listed weight: 195 lb (88 kg)

Career information
- High school: Chino Hills (Chino Hills, California); La Salle College Prep (Pasadena, California); Cathedral (Los Angeles, California)
- College: Washington State (2017–2018); California Baptist (2018–2020)
- NBA draft: 2020: undrafted
- Playing career: 2021–present

Career history
- 2021–2022: Enosis Neon Paralimni
- 2022-2023: Apollon Limassol B.C.
- 2024-2025: BK Inter Bratislava
- 2025-present: London Lightning

Career highlights
- WAC Player of the Year (2020); 2× First-team All-WAC (2019, 2020); WAC Newcomer of the Year (2019)

Milan Terrell Acquaah (born December 22, 1997) is an American-Ghanaian professional basketball player for the London Lightning. He played college basketball for the Washington State Cougars and the California Baptist Lancers.

== Early life ==
Acquaah was raised in Bakersfield, California and attended Warren Middle School. He began his high school career at Chino Hills High School and befriended Lonzo Ball after meeting him at a gym in Los Angeles. Acquaah is mentioned on Ball's hip hop album Born 2 Ball. Acquaah transferred to La Salle College Prep. He transferred again to Cathedral High School and played alongside Kobe Paras. Acquaah made a game-winning three-pointer to win the San Fernando Valley Invitational championship in December 2014. Acquaah was regarded as a three-star prospect, the No. 39 point guard in his class, and signed with Washington State in November 2015.

== College career ==
Acquaah began his collegiate career at Washington State where he redshirted his freshman season. During his redshirt year, coach Ernie Kent called him "unguardable" during scrimmages. As a redshirt freshman, Acquaah averaged 4.9 points and 1.9 assists per game, making nine starts. He scored a season-high 13 points during a loss to UCLA. After the season, Acquaah announced he was transferring.

Acquaah opted to move to California Baptist, which was transferring to Division I, and was granted a waiver for immediate eligibility. He scored 36 points in a win against New Mexico State on January 3, 2019. As a redshirt sophomore, Acquaah averaged 19.0 points and 5.0 rebounds per game. He was named WAC player of the week honors twice and was named WAC Newcomer of the Year and First Team All-Conference. After the season, he declared for the 2019 NBA draft but decided to return to California Baptist. As a junior, Acquaah averaged 18.1 points, 5.8 assists, and 4.9 rebounds per game. He was named WAC Player of the Year. Following the season, he declared for the 2020 NBA draft.

== Professional career ==
On July 25, 2021, Acquaah signed his first professional contract with Enosis Neon Paralimni of the Cyprus Basketball Division A. In November 2021, he received a Hoops Agent Player of the Week award for round 6. He had 34 points, 7 rebounds, and 8 assists.

In January 2023, Acquaah signed with Apollon Limassol B.C.

On June 24, 2024, Acquaah signed with BK Inter Bratislava. He had previously been the top scorer at Apollon where he averaged 17.3 points, 4.6 rebounds and 4.4 assists per game.

== Personal life ==
Acquaah is the son of Tracy Acquaah and Michelle Johnson. He is an only child.

== Career statistics ==
Legend
GP	Games played	GS	Games started	MPG	Minutes per game
FG%	Field goal percentage	3P%	3-point field goal percentage	FT%	Free throw percentage
RPG	Rebounds per game	APG	Assists per game	SPG	Steals per game
BPG	Blocks per game	PPG	Points per game	**Bold**	Career high

=== College ===
Year	Team	GP	GS	MPG	FG%	3P%	FT%	RPG	APG	SPG	BPG	PPG
2016–17	Washington State	Redshirt										
2017–18	Washington State	30	9	17.5	.388	.263	.540	1.8	1.9	.6	.0	4.9
2018–19	California Baptist	**31**	30	32.1	**.415**	**.374**	**.850**	**5.0**	3.4	**1.6**	.1	**19.0**
2019–20	California Baptist	**31**	**31**	**32.6**	.376	.318	.836	4.9	**5.8**	.9	**.2**	18.1
Career		92	70	27.5	.394	.336	.802	3.9	3.7	1.0	.1	14.1
