= Rick Majerus =

American basketball coach (1948–2012)

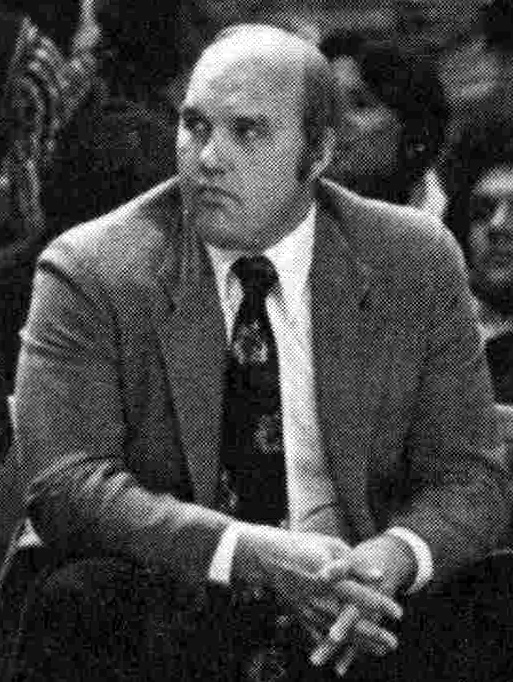
- Majerus in the 1977–78 season as Marquette assistant coach

Biographical details
- Born: February 17, 1948; Sheboygan Falls, Wisconsin, U.S.
- Died: December 1, 2012 (aged 64); Los Angeles, California, U.S.

Playing career
- 1967–1968: Marquette

Coaching career (HC unless noted)
- 1971–1983: Marquette (assistant)
- 1983–1986: Marquette
- 1986–1987: Milwaukee Bucks (assistant)
- 1987–1989: Ball State
- 1989–2004: Utah
- 2007–2012: Saint Louis

Head coaching record
- Overall: 517–215
- Tournaments: 19–12 (NCAA Division I); 8–4 (NIT); 3–1 (CBI)

Accomplishments and honors

Championships
- NCAA Regional—Final Four (1998); MAC regular season (1989); MAC tournament (1989); 6 WAC regular season (1991, 1993, 1995–1997, 1999); 3 WAC tournament (1995, 1997, 1999); 2 MWC regular season (2000, 2003)

Awards
- 5× WAC Coach of the Year (1991, 1993, 1995, 1997, 1999); MAC Coach of the Year (1989)
- College Basketball Hall of Fame; Inducted in 2019

Richard Raymond Majerus (February 17, 1948 – December 1, 2012) was an American basketball coach and TV analyst. He coached at Marquette University (1983–1986), Ball State University (1987–1989), the University of Utah (1989–2004), and Saint Louis University (2007–2012). Majerus's most successful season came at Utah in the 1997–98 season, when the Utes finished as runners-up in the 1998 NCAA Division I men's basketball tournament. Majerus was inducted into the College Basketball Hall of Fame in 2019.

== Early life ==
Majerus was the son of Alyce and Raymond Majerus, a Kohler factory worker and labor leader who was at one time secretary-treasurer of the United Auto Workers. Rick was raised with sisters Jodi and Tracy.

As a teenager, Rick accompanied his father to the civil rights marches in Selma, Alabama, an experience that had a profound impact on him. A voracious reader, he read four complete newspapers a day according to his sisters.

Majerus graduated from Marquette University High School in 1966. He stayed in Milwaukee, attending Marquette University, where he was the first in his family to attend college. He tried out as a walk-on in the 1967 season and played for the Marquette freshman team. He did not play varsity basketball for Marquette, but stayed on as a student assistant. He graduated in 1970 with a bachelor's degree in history.

== Coaching career ==
While at Marquette and serving as a student assistant for the Warriors, Majerus began coaching eighth-graders at St. Sebastian Grade School in Milwaukee, then coached freshmen boys at Marquette University High School.

=== Marquette (1971–1986) ===
In 1971, after graduating from Marquette, Majerus became an assistant coach with the Marquette Warriors, where he remained for 12 years, serving under mentor Al McGuire and Hank Raymonds, before taking over as head coach in 1983. He was an assistant under McGuire when the Warriors advanced to the 1974 Final four and won the 1977 NCAA Championship. Longtime NBA player and coach Glenn "Doc" Rivers played at Marquette and it was Majerus that gave Rivers his "Doc" nickname.

As head coach at Marquette, Majerus led the Warriors to a 56–35 (.615) record and three consecutive NIT appearances in his three seasons.

=== Milwaukee Bucks (1986–1987) ===
After three years as head coach at Marquette, he became an assistant coach with the National Basketball Association's Milwaukee Bucks for the 1986–87 season, serving under Don Nelson.

=== Ball State (1987–1989) ===
He coached at Ball State University for two seasons where he had a record of 43–17. After a 14–14 initial season, Majerus led the team to the second round of the NCAA tournament in the 1988–89 season. The 1988–89 team holds the record for best men's basketball won-lost mark (29–3) in Ball State University history.

=== Utah (1989–2004) ===
Majerus accepted the position at Utah in 1989. In leading the "Runnin Utes" to a 1996 sweet 16 match up against Kentucky, Kentucky Coach Rick Pitino had given the opinion that Utah should be favored to win the game. Majerus responded, "if you put the two of us in a sumo ring I'd crush him. On the basketball court, I think we're in trouble."

Majerus led Utah to the Final Four in 1998 NCAA tournament, eventually losing to Kentucky in the national championship game after the Utes blew a ten point halftime lead. He was greatly affected by the loss, and claimed to be able to recite the last six minutes of play of the championship game second by second. After the 1998 championship game loss to Kentucky, Majerus responded, "When I die, they might as well bury me at the finish line at Churchill Downs so they can run over me again."

While at Utah, he was known for living out of a hotel room, noting that he liked that "There's clean towels, my bed is turned down every night and there's a mint on my pillow, no matter what psychological or emotional crisis the maid is going through."

==== 1994 Team USA ====
He was an assistant coach under Don Nelson for the US national team in the 1994 FIBA World Championship, winning the gold medal.

Majerus left the Utah team after the opening game of the 2000–01 season to rehabilitate his right knee. Intending to return after the first week of 2001, Majerus was hospitalized on New Year's Day 2001 due to chest pains. Later in January 2001, Majerus announced that he would sit out the rest of the season to recover from his own health problems and to be with his ailing mother. He handed over the team to assistant Dick Hunsaker, who guided the team to a 19–10 record and an NIT appearance. Majerus then returned to Utah in the fall of 2001.

Majerus was accused of berating and verbally abuse his players. Lance Allred, who wrote about it in his autobiography Longshot: The Adventures of a Deaf Fundamentalist Mormon Kid and His Journey to the NBA, told of his three years at Utah and that Majerus would humiliate him, often targeting his disability—Allred being partially deaf and requiring hearing aids. Allred transferred after the 2001–02 season, but Majerus was later "cleared of any wrongdoing."

He left Utah in January 2004 after 15 seasons and a 323–95 (.773) record, in part to get control of his health.

=== USC resignation (2004) ===
On December 15, 2004, Majerus was hired as coach of the University of Southern California basketball team; he was to replace interim coach Jim Saia, who was replacing fired coach Henry Bibby, with Majerus taking over effective April 1, 2005. His contract was scheduled to pay him $5 million over five years.

Majerus gave an energetic and humorous press conference on the day of his hire, but also noted "I hope I die here. I hope I coach here the rest of my life." In order to take the position, he needed to buy himself out of his contract as an analyst for ESPN. However, Majerus unexpectedly resigned only five days later in a somber, and at times weeping, press conference. He apologized to the university and stated that his health and fitness were not yet at a stage where he thought he could perform his new duties, noting "I wanted this job so bad I was in denial where my health actually is [...] I realized [USC] wasn't getting the guy they hired. I came to that conclusion myself. I'm not fit for this job by my standards." Years later, however, Majerus would claim that the true reason for his change of mind had not been his health, but rather had been his mother's request that he not take the job, which would have meant his relocation to Los Angeles, far removed from her home in Wisconsin.

=== ESPN analyst (2004–2007) ===
Majerus worked as a game and studio analyst for ESPN from 2004 to 2007.

=== Saint Louis (2007–2012) ===
On April 27, 2007, Majerus accepted the head coaching position at Saint Louis University; his contract was for six years. His tenure at SLU got off to a rocky start; in their first conference game, the Billikens set an NCAA Division I record for fewest points scored in a game in the modern era of college basketball, losing 49–20 to George Washington. However, as he had done previously at other programs, Majerus eventually made SLU a winning program. In 2012, he led the Billikens to their first NCAA Tournament in 12 years, and their first appearance in a major poll in 17 years.

On August 24, 2012, Majerus announced he would not coach the 2012–13 season due to serious heart problems. Jim Crews, one of his assistants, took over for him on a temporary basis for that season. On November 16, it was announced that Majerus was retiring when it was apparent that his heart condition would not improve enough to allow him to return.

Majerus compiled a 95–69 (.579) record at St. Louis University and retired with an overall NCAA record of 517–215 (.706).

On September 18, 2023, SLU named its basketball practice court after the late coach, with his sisters and former players attending the dedication ceremony.

=== Health and eventual death ===
For years, Majerus battled health problems due to obesity. He missed all but the first six games of the 1989–90 season, which was his first at Utah, after undergoing septuple-bypass surgery. After the surgery, Majerus quipped, "They did seven bypasses on me—one for each of the major food groups."

In September 2000, Majerus had arthroscopic surgery on his right knee but didn't follow a doctor's orders to take a break from basketball; this prevented his knee from healing properly. On New Year's Day 2001, Majerus complained of chest pains and was hospitalized for one week, prompting him to take the rest of the year off from coaching to devote his energies to his health and also to his ailing mother. He returned to coaching in the fall of 2001.

Majerus died of heart failure in a Los Angeles hospital on December 1, 2012, at age 64. A public memorial service for current and former athletes, coaches, students, and members of the St. Louis and SLU community was held on Friday, December 7, 2012, at 3:30 p.m. at Chaifetz Arena on the SLU campus. His private funeral service was held at Milwaukee's Church of the Gesu on Saturday, December 8,.

Saint Louis University athletic director Chris May said of Majerus "His enduring passion to see his players excel both on and off the court. He truly embraced the term 'student-athlete,' and I think that will be his lasting legacy." Utah athletic director Dr. Chris Hill said, "Rick left a lasting legacy at the University of Utah, not only for his incredible success and the national prominence he brought to our basketball program, but also for the tremendous impact he made on the young men who were fortunate enough to play on his teams."

== Personal life ==
Majerus's father, Raymond, died of a heart attack at 63 in 1987. Raymond was a former secretary-treasurer of the United Auto Workers. Majerus was devoted to his mother, Alyce, until her death in August 2011, after initially being diagnosed with cancer in 1987. His mother would take factory work to afford to buy her children Christmas presents. Rick affectionately called her Rosie the Riveter. The family was Catholic.

Majerus was married to Deor Mary Hitt for two years in the mid-1980s and dated the same woman in the last 25 years of his life.

"The thing about Rick was he never wanted to sleep," said longtime coach Bill Foster, Majerus's close friend. "He wanted to sit in a restaurant, order more food and talk basketball. He was never happier than when he was doing that."

== Legacy ==
In 2015, Majerus's sisters, on behalf of the family, donated $1 million to Marquette University. The donation founded the Rick Majerus Endowed Scholarship, which will help first-generation students in the Helen Way Klingler College of Arts and Sciences. His sister Jodi said, "knowing my mom and dad and the importance they placed on education, and knowing Rick and how he looked at life in general, it feels like a natural thing to do." The Majerus Family Foundation also donated $2 million to the Huntsman Cancer Institute in Salt Lake City toward construction of a children's research center. The Foundation also hosts annual dinners for the homeless in Milwaukee on the birthdays of Majerus and each of his parents.

== Awards and honors ==
- WAC Coach of the Year: 1991, 1993, 1995, 1997 (media), 1999
- District Coach of the Year (1991, 1993, 1995, 1996)
- Playboy Magazine Coach of the Year (1992, 1998)
- UPI National Coach of the Year (1991)
- Basketball Times National Coach of the Year (1991)
- Utah Sports Person of the Year (1992 and 1997)
- Trademark sweater retired and hung from the rafters at Jon M. Huntsman Center on February 2, 2013
- St. Thomas More High School in Milwaukee, Wisconsin installed the new "Rick Majerus Court" in 2016, with support from the Majerus Family Foundation.
- Majerus was inducted into the College Basketball Hall of Fame on November 24, 2019.
- Rick Majerus Court at SLU's Chaifetz Pavilion was dedicated on September 18, 2023

== Head coaching record ==
Record table
Season	Team	Overall	Conference	Standing	Postseason
Marquette Warriors (NCAA Division I independent) (1983–1986)
1983–84	Marquette	17–13			NIT Second Round
1984–85	Marquette	20–11			NIT Quarterfinal
1985–86	Marquette	19–11			NIT Second Round
Marquette:		56–35 (.615)			
Ball State Cardinals (Mid-American Conference) (1987–1989)
1987–88	Ball State	14–14	8–8	4th	
1988–89	Ball State	29–3	14–2	1st	NCAA Division I Second Round
Ball State:		43–17 (.717)	22–10 (.688)		
Utah Utes (Western Athletic Conference) (1989–1999)
1989–90	Utah	4–2^{*}			
1990–91	Utah	30–4	15–1	1st	NCAA Division I Sweet 16
1991–92	Utah	24–11	9–7	T–4th	NIT Third Place
1992–93	Utah	24–7	15–3	T–1st	NCAA Division I Second Round
1993–94	Utah	14–14	8–10	T–5th	
1994–95	Utah	28–6	15–3	1st	NCAA Division I Second Round
1995–96	Utah	27–7	15–3	1st	NCAA Division I Sweet 16
1996–97	Utah	29–4	15–1	1st (Mountain)	NCAA Division I Elite Eight
1997–98	Utah	30–4	12–2	1st (Mountain)	NCAA Division I Runner-up
1998–99	Utah	28–5	14–0	1st (Pacific)	NCAA Division I Second Round
Utah Utes (Mountain West Conference) (1999–2004)
1999–00	Utah	23–9	10–4	T–1st	NCAA Division I Second Round
2000–01	Utah	1–0^{**}			
2001–02	Utah	24–9	10–4	2nd	NCAA Division I First Round
2002–03	Utah	25–8	11–3	T–1st	NCAA Division I Second Round
2003–04	Utah	15–5^{***}	3–2		
Utah:		323–95 (.773)	152–43 (.779)		
Saint Louis Billikens (Atlantic 10 Conference) (2007–2012)
2007–08	Saint Louis	16–15	7–9	T–9th	
2008–09	Saint Louis	18–14	8–8	5th	
2009–10	Saint Louis	23–13	11–5	4th	CBI Runner-up
2010–11	Saint Louis	12–19	6–10	T–10th	
2011–12	Saint Louis	26–8	12–4	2nd	NCAA Division I Second Round
Saint Louis:		95–69 (.579)	44–36 (.550)		
Total:		517–215 (.706)			
National champion Postseason invitational champion Conference regular season champion Conference regular season and conference tournament champion Division regular season champion Division regular season and conference tournament champion Conference tournament champion

^{*}Coached the first six games before undergoing heart surgery. Assistant Joe Cravens coached the rest of the season.
^{**}Coached the first game before taking a personal leave of absence. Assistant Dick Hunsaker coached the rest of the season.
^{***}Coached the first 20 games before retiring due to health concerns. Assistant Kerry Rupp coached the rest of the season.

== Published works ==
In 2000, he released an autobiography, My Life on a Napkin: Pillow Mints, Playground Dreams and Coaching the Runnin' Utes (ISBN 0-7868-8445-2), co-written by Gene Wojciechowski.

== See also ==
- List of NCAA Division I Men's Final Four appearances by coach
