= United Athletic Conference Men's Basketball Player of the Year =

Basketball award

UAC Men's Basketball Player of the Year
- Awarded for: the most outstanding basketball player in the United Athletic Conference
- Country: United States

History
- First award: 1981
- Most recent: Dominique Daniels Jr., California Baptist

The United Athletic Conference Men's Basketball Player of the Year is an award given to the United Athletic Conference's (UAC) most outstanding player. The award was first given following the 1980–81 season when the conference was still known as the Western Athletic Conference (WAC). Keith Van Horn of Utah and Nick Fazekas of Nevada are the only players to have won the award three times. Three other players—Michael Cage, Josh Grant and Melvin Ely—have won the award twice. Danny Ainge, the first ever WAC Player of the Year, was also the John R. Wooden Award winner in 1980–81.

Utah has the most all-time winners with seven. There have been four ties in the award's history, most notably in 1982–83 when there was a three-way tie. Due mainly to major membership turnover in the early 2010s and 2020s, no current UAC member has a winner.

In 2026, the WAC rebranded as the United Athletic Conference (UAC), which expanded from a football-only alliance between the WAC and Atlantic Sun Conference (ASUN) to a multi-sports league. Three of the seven WAC members transferred to the UAC: Abilene Christian, Tarleton State, and UT Arlington. Of the six other UAC all-sports members in 2026–27, five came from the ASUN, with Little Rock joining from the Ohio Valley Conference.

== Key ==
†	Co-Players of the Year
*	Awarded a national player of the year award that same season: UPI College Basketball Player of the Year (1954–55 to 1995–96); Oscar Robertson Trophy (1958–59 to present); Naismith College Player of the Year (1968–69 to present); John R. Wooden Award (1976–77 to present)
Player (X)	Denotes the number of times the player has been awarded the UAC Player of the Year award at that point

== Winners ==
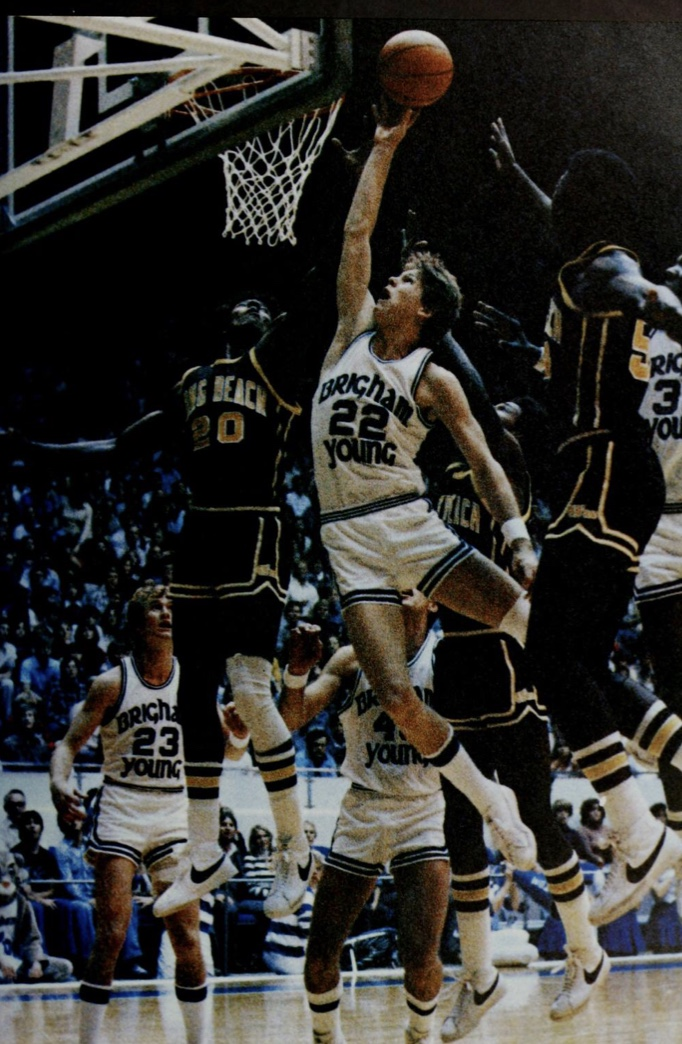
Danny Ainge, BYU, 1981

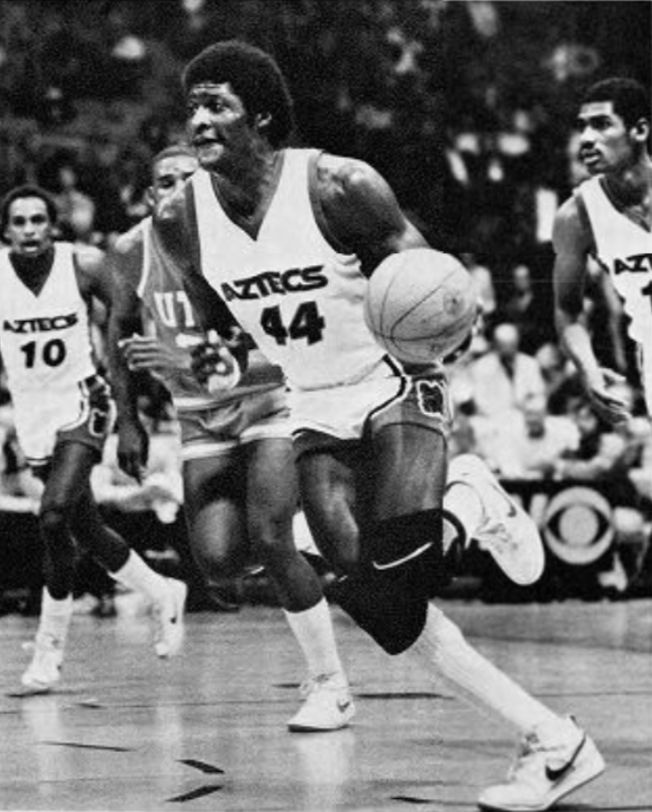
Michael Cage, San Diego State, 1983 and 1984

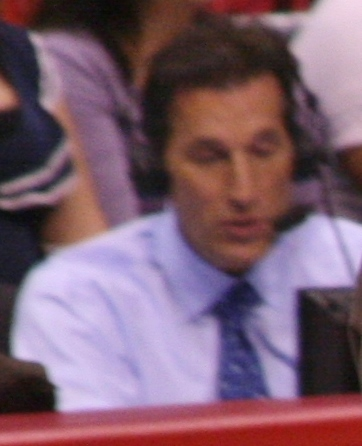
Michael Smith, BYU, 1988

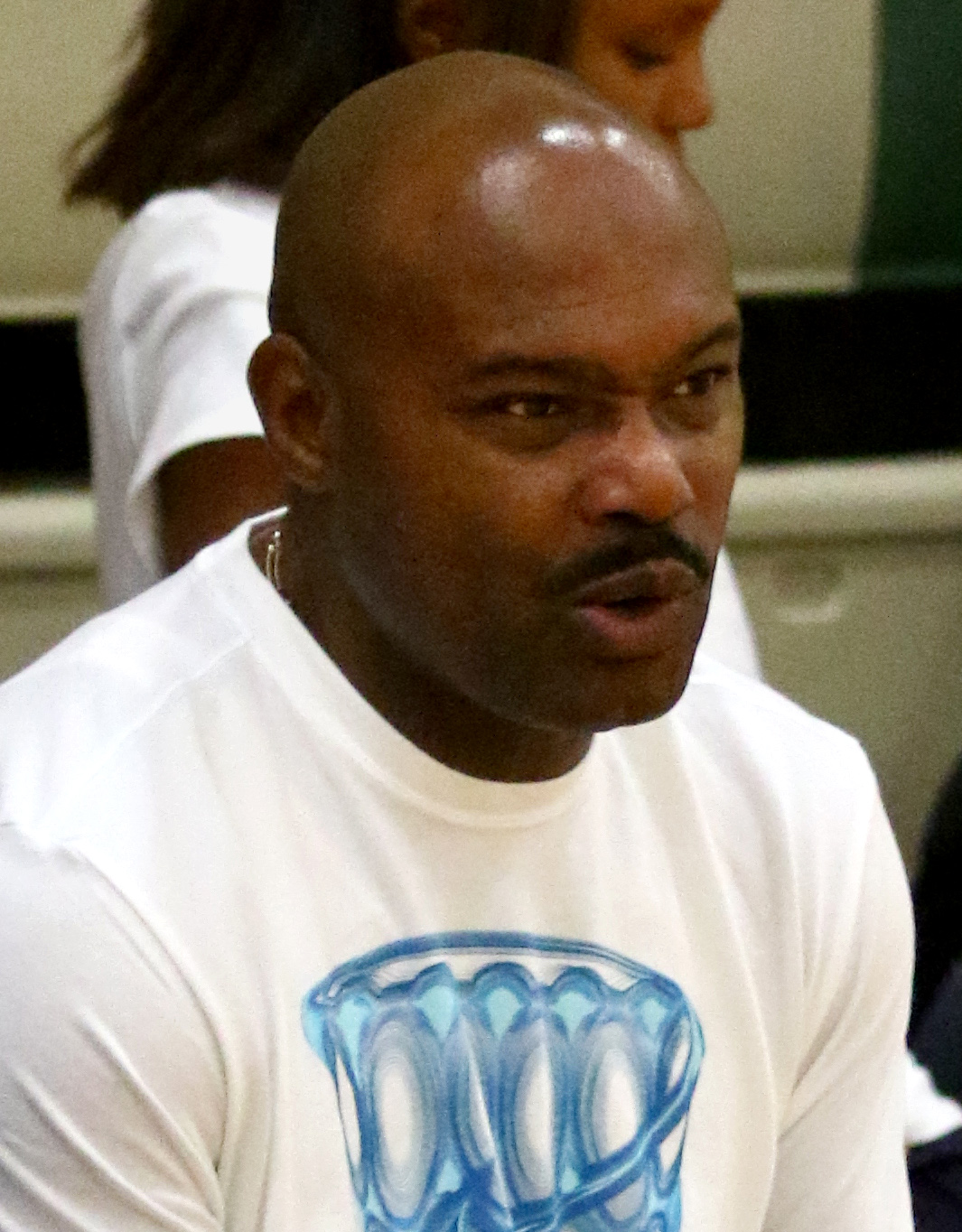
Tim Hardaway, UTEP, 1989

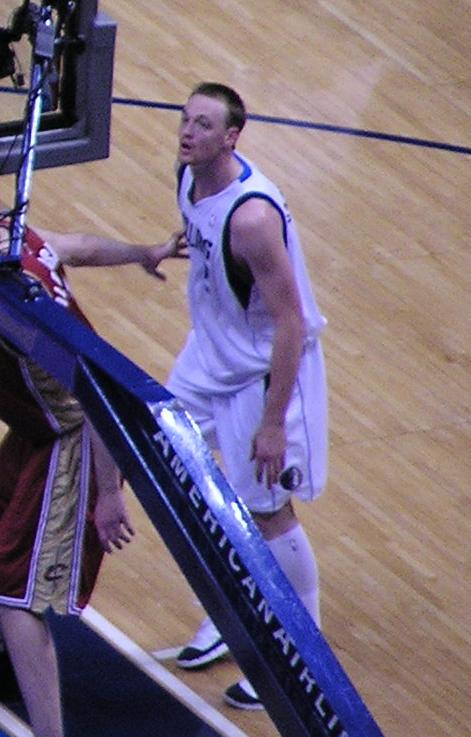
Keith Van Horn, Utah, 1995 through 1997

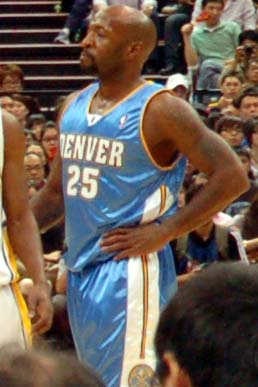
Anthony Carter, Hawaii, 1997

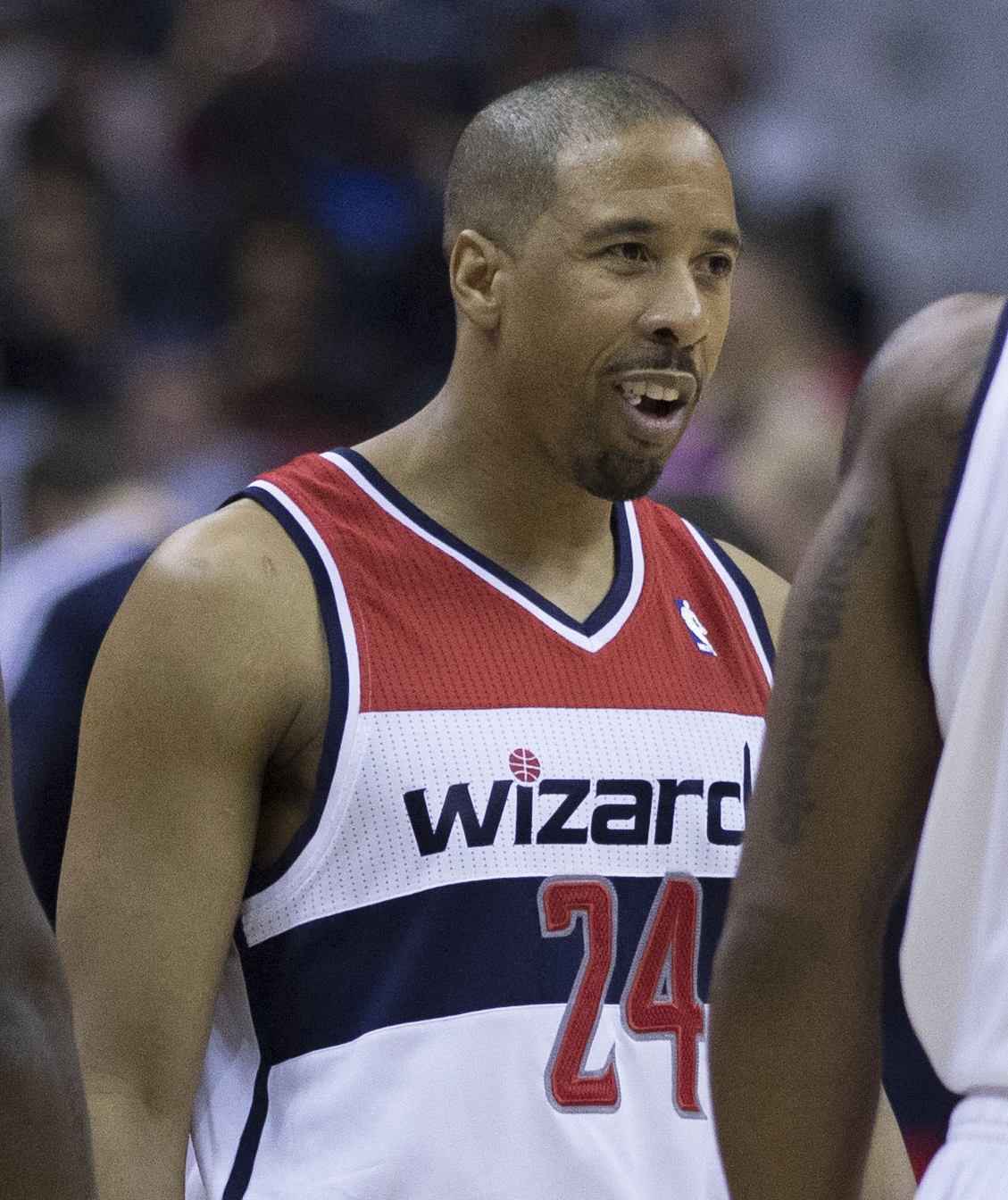
Andre Miller, Utah, 1999

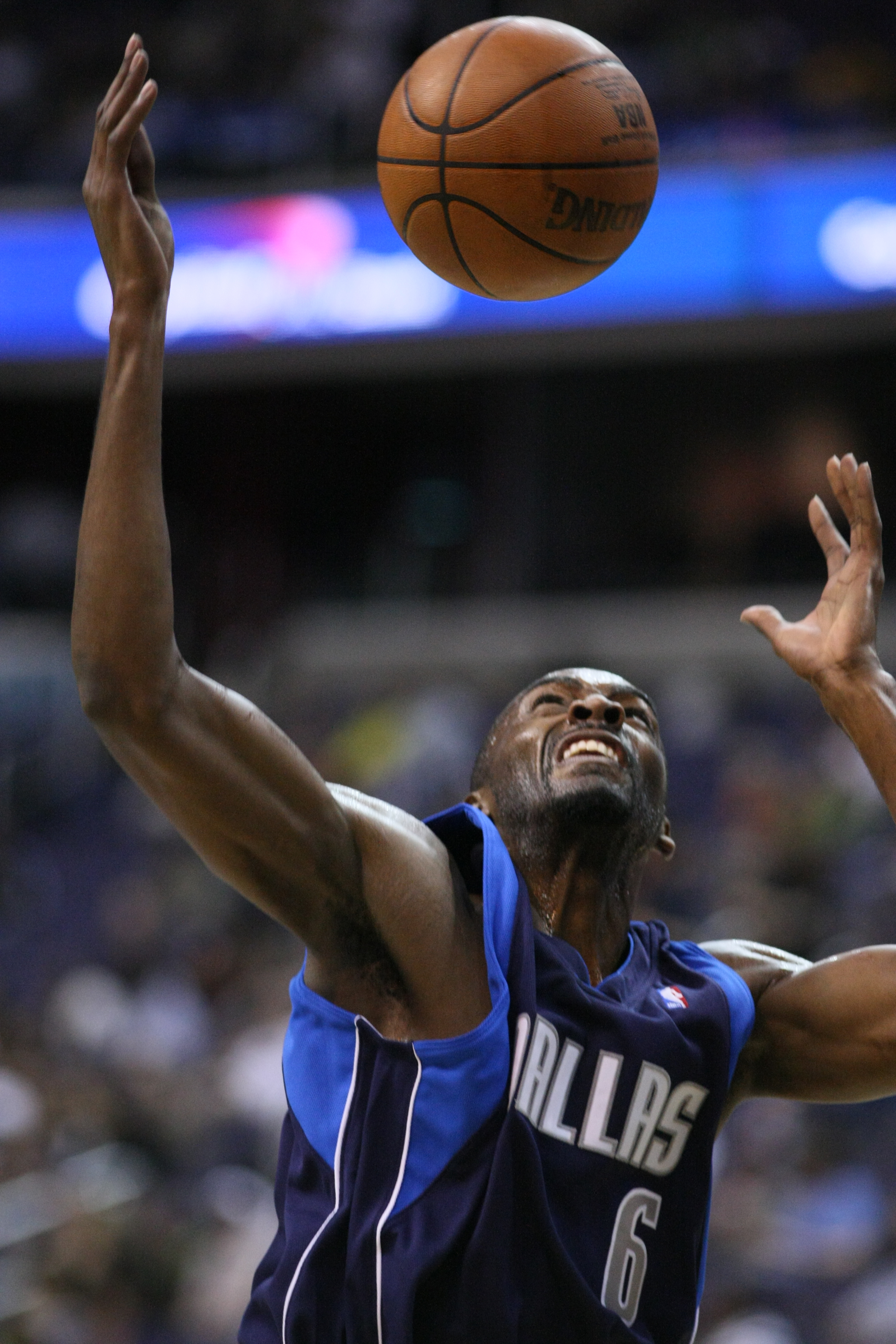
Quinton Ross, SMU, 2003

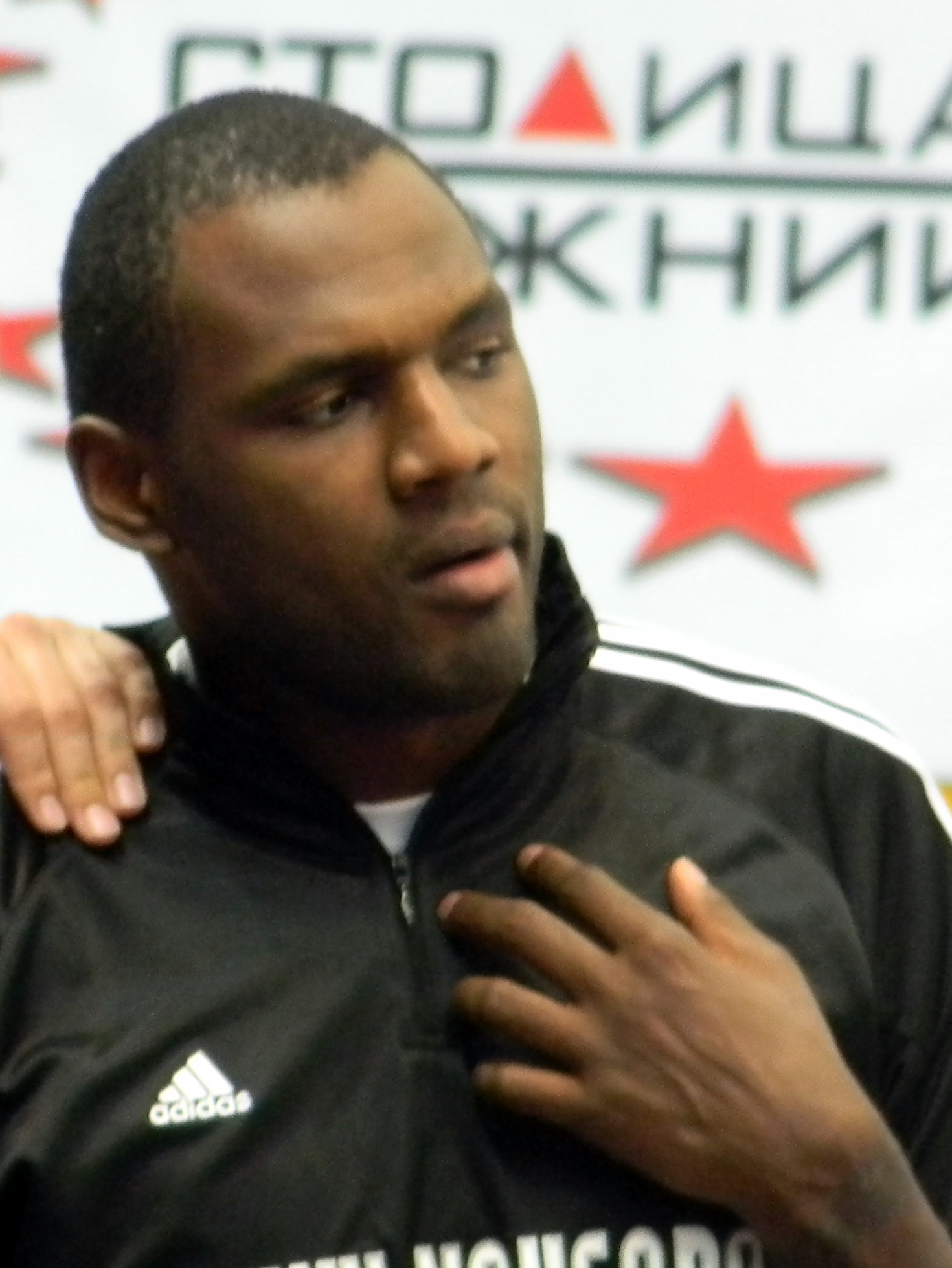
Kirk Snyder, Nevada, 2004

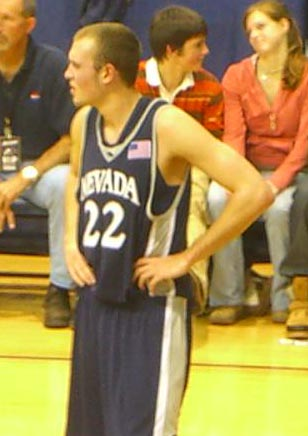
Nick Fazekas, Nevada, 2005 through 2007

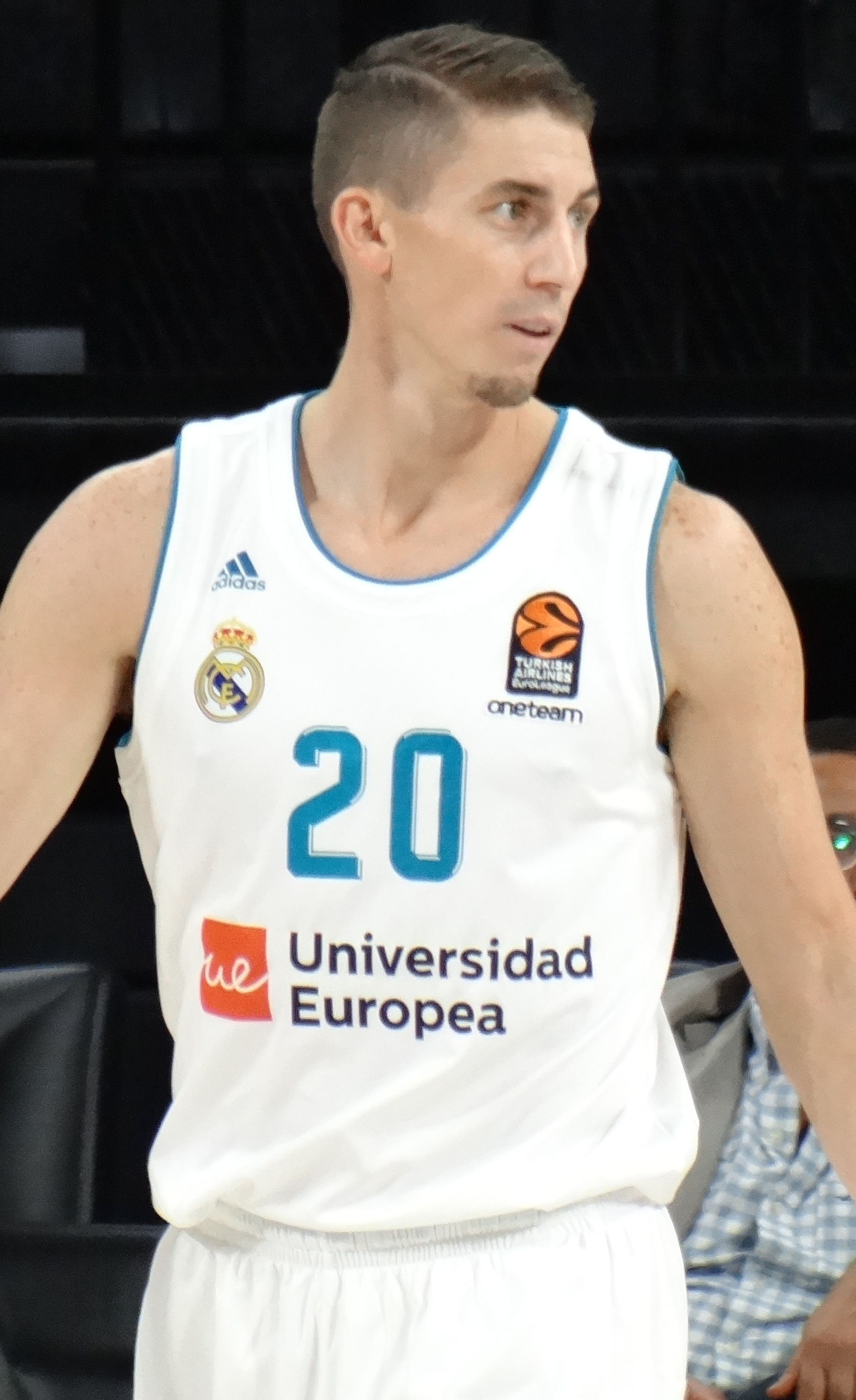
Jaycee Carroll, Utah State, 2008

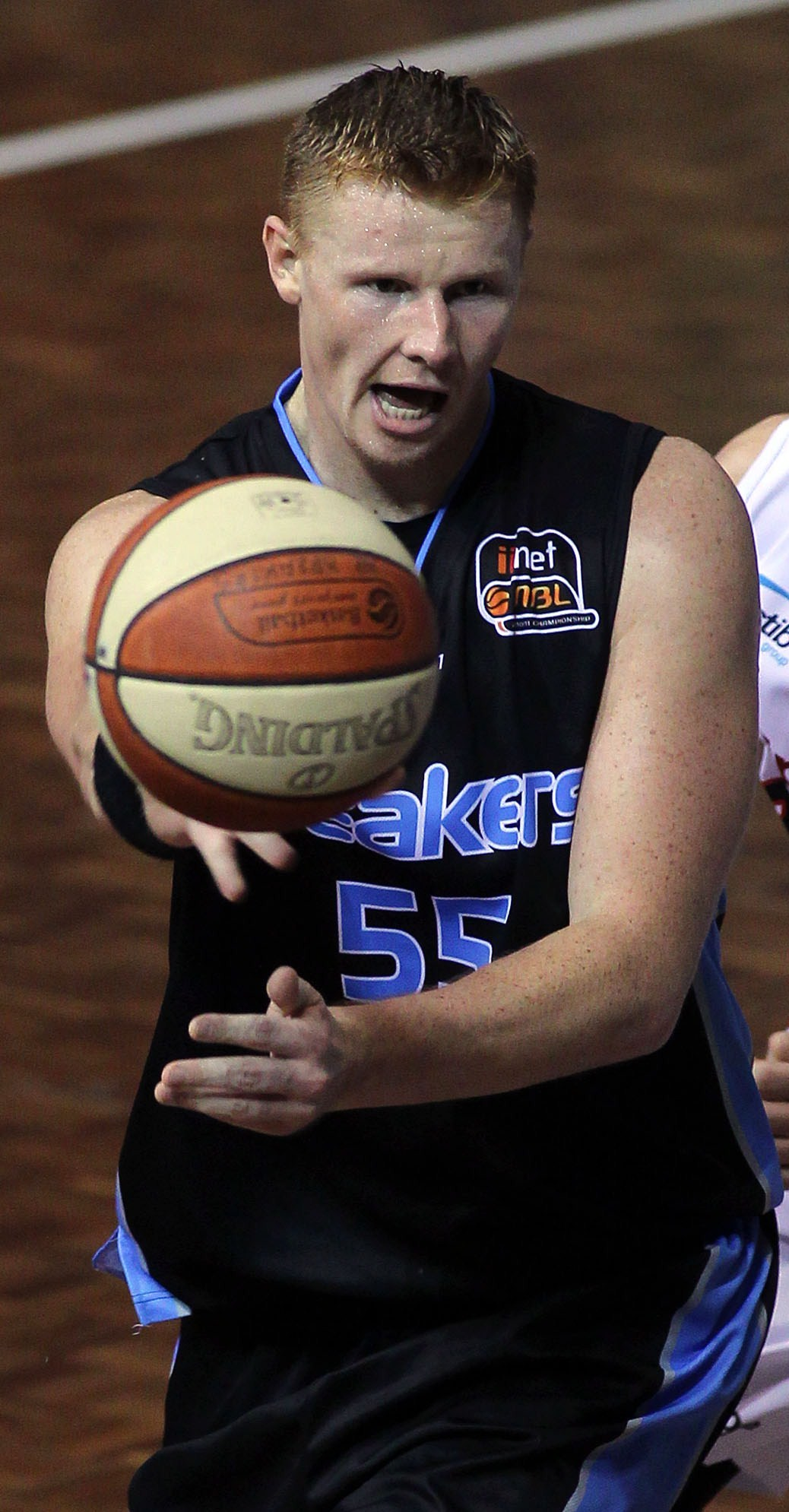
Gary Wilkinson, Utah State, 2009

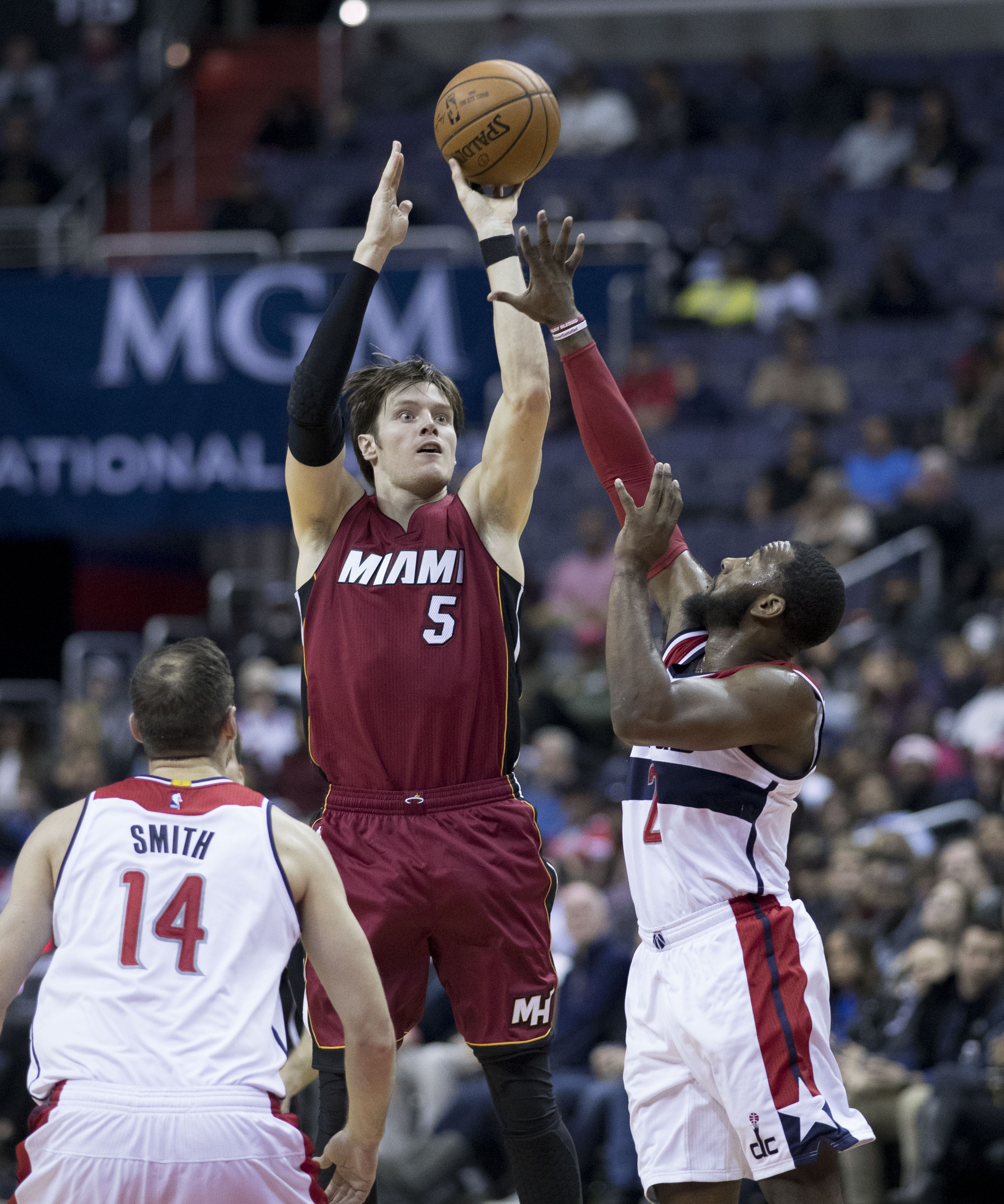
Luke Babbitt, Nevada, 2010

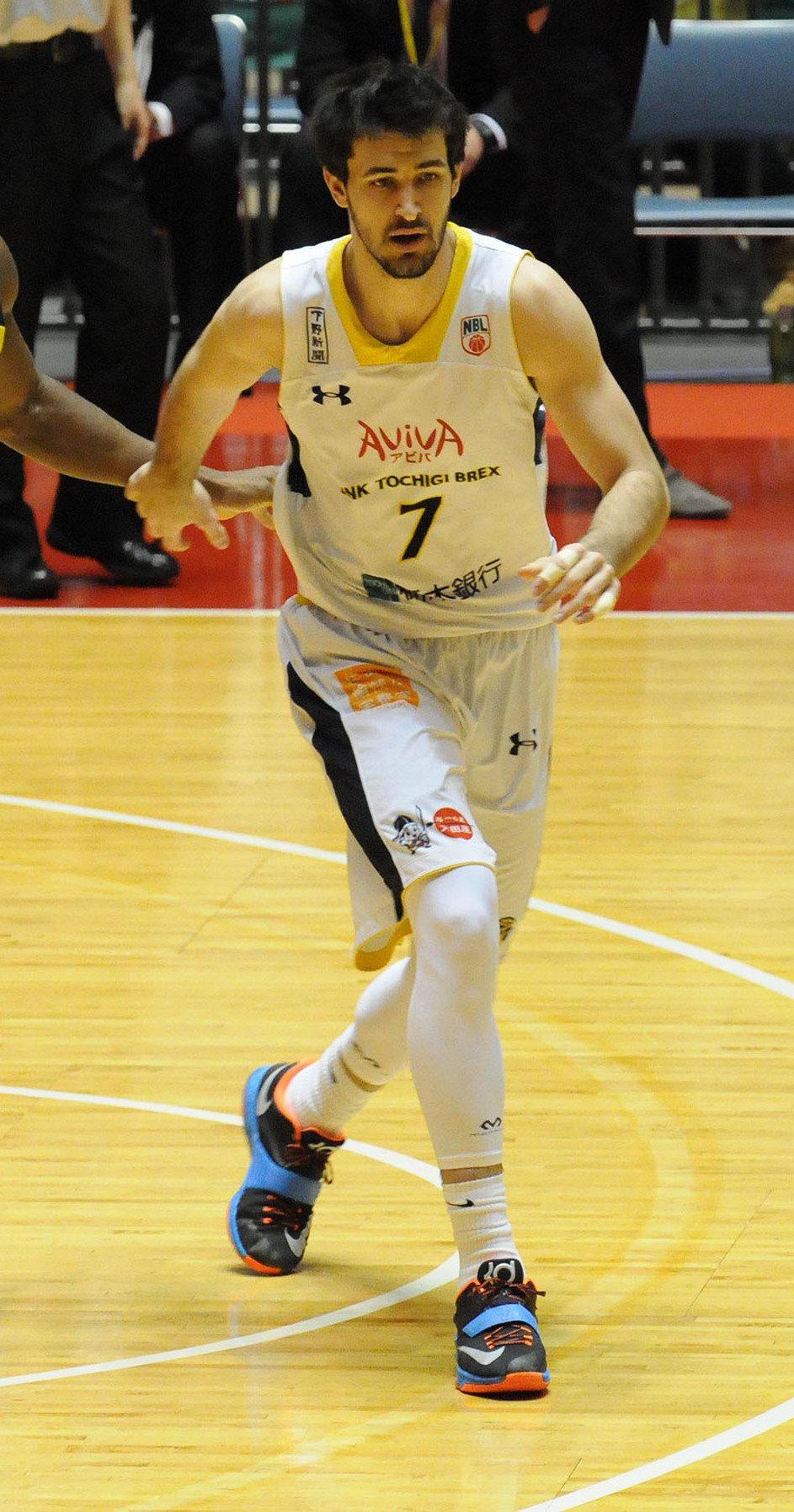
Kyle Barone, Idaho, 2013

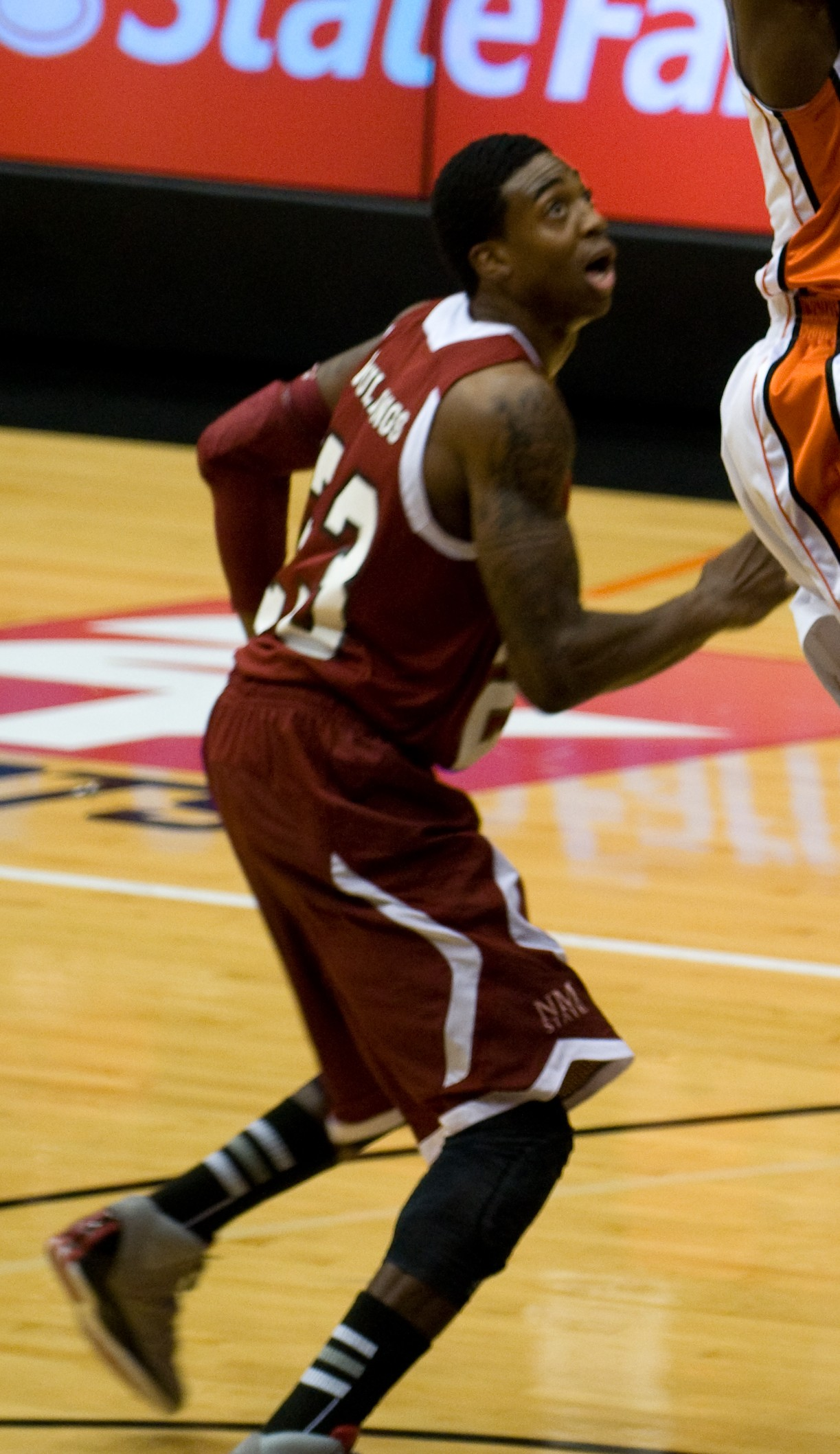
Daniel Mullings, New Mexico State, 2014

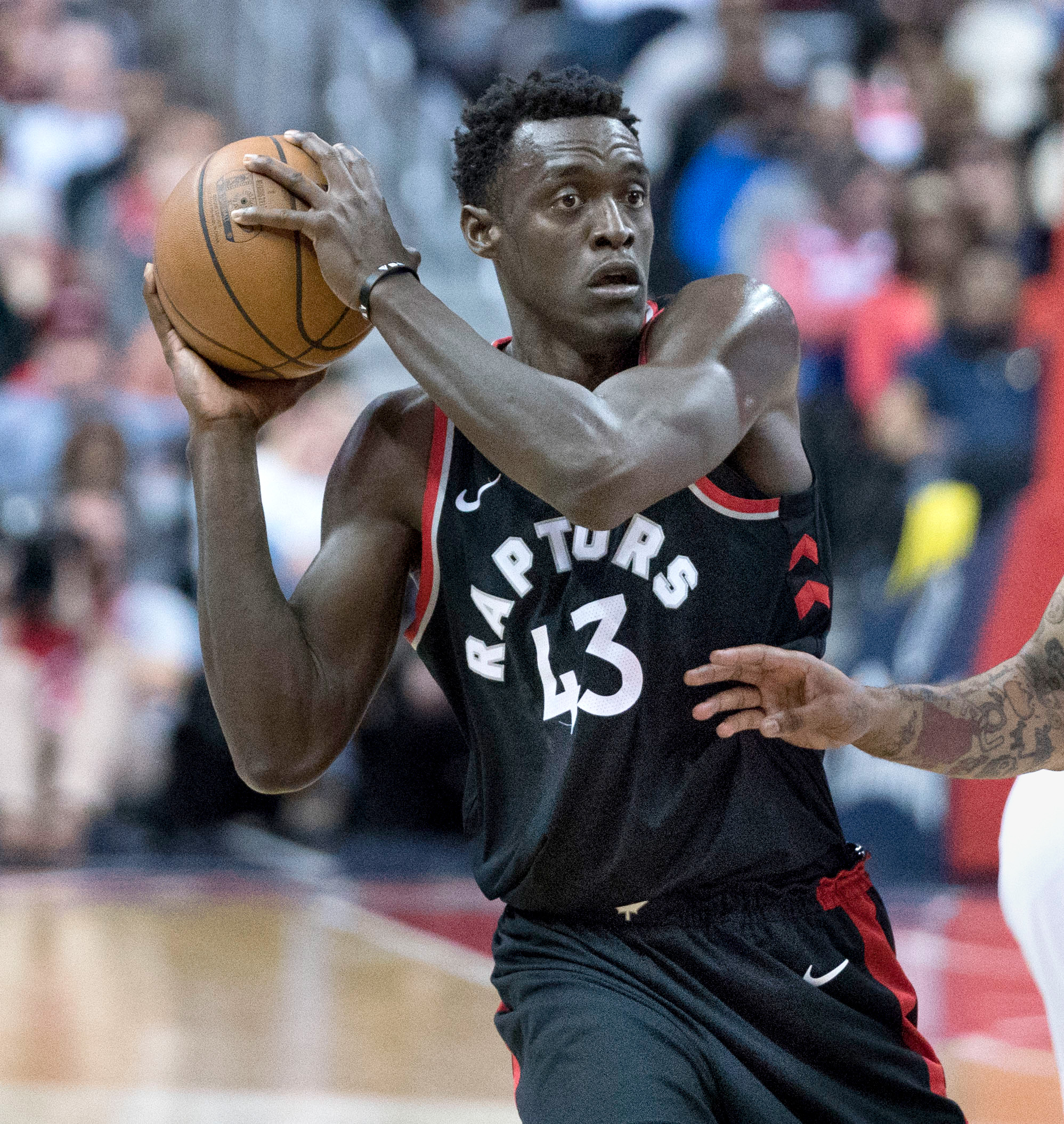
Pascal Siakam, New Mexico State, 2016

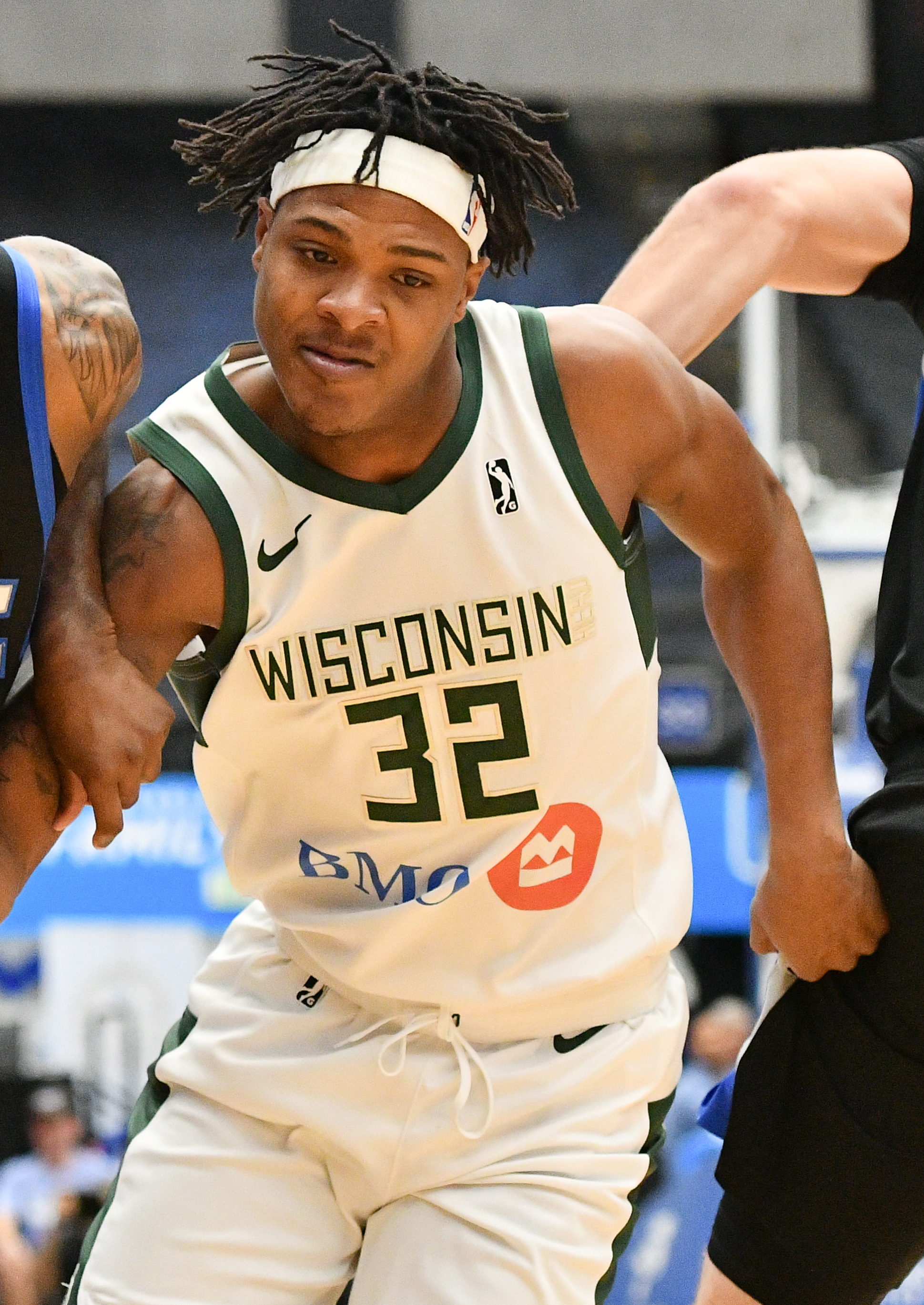
Jemerrio Jones, New Mexico State, 2018

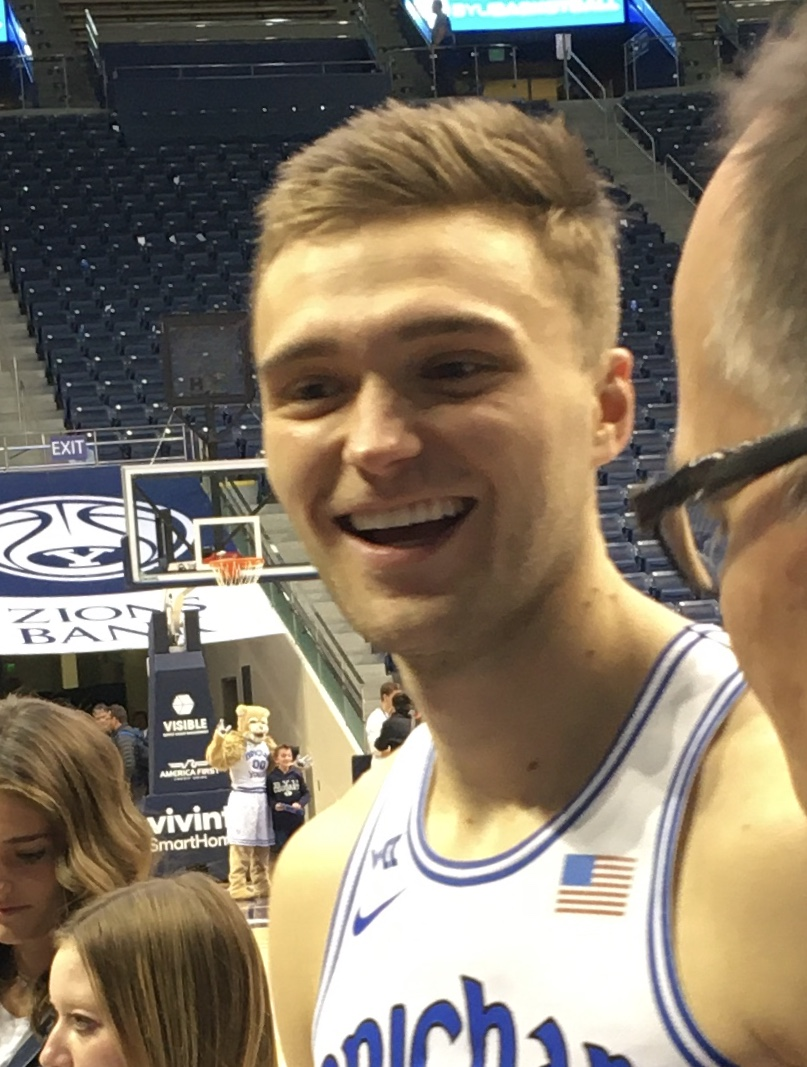
Jake Toolson, Utah Valley, 2019

Season	Player	School	Position	Class	Reference
1980–81	Danny Ainge*	BYU	SG	Senior	
1981–82	Bill Garnett	Wyoming	SF	Senior	
1982–83^{†}	Michael Cage	San Diego State	C	Junior	
1982–83^{†}	Devin Durrant	BYU	SF	Junior	
1982–83^{†}	Pace Mannion	Utah	SG	Senior	
1983–84	Michael Cage (2)	San Diego State	C	Senior	
1984–85	Timo Saarelainen	BYU	SF	Senior	
1985–86	Anthony Watson	San Diego State	F	Senior	
1986–87	Fennis Dembo	Wyoming	SF	Senior	
1987–88	Michael Smith	BYU	SF	Junior	
1988–89	Tim Hardaway	UTEP	PG	Senior	
1989–90	Mike Mitchell	Colorado State	F	Senior	
1990–91	Josh Grant	Utah	PF	Junior	
1991–92	Reggie Slater	Wyoming	F	Senior	
1992–93	Josh Grant (2)	Utah	PF	Senior	
1993–94	Greg Brown	New Mexico	PG	Senior	
1994–95	Keith Van Horn	Utah	SG / SF	Sophomore	
1995–96	Keith Van Horn (2)	Utah	SG / SF	Junior	
1996–97^{†}	Anthony Carter	Hawaii	PG	Junior	
1996–97^{†}	Keith Van Horn (3)	Utah	SG / SF	Senior	
1997–98^{†}	Lee Nailon	TCU	PF	Junior	
1997–98^{†}	Clayton Shields	New Mexico	SG / SF	Senior	
1998–99^{†}	Andre Miller	Utah	PG	Senior	
1998–99^{†}	Jeryl Sasser	SMU	SG	Sophomore	
1999–00	Courtney Alexander	Fresno State	SG	Senior	
2000–01	Melvin Ely	Fresno State	C	Junior	
2001–02	Melvin Ely (2)	Fresno State	C	Senior	
2002–03	Quinton Ross	SMU	PF	Senior	
2003–04	Kirk Snyder	Nevada	SG / SF	Junior	
2004–05	Nick Fazekas	Nevada	PF / C	Sophomore	
2005–06	Nick Fazekas (2)	Nevada	PF / C	Junior	
2006–07	Nick Fazekas (3)	Nevada	PF / C	Senior	
2007–08	Jaycee Carroll	Utah State	SG	Senior	
2008–09	Gary Wilkinson	Utah State	F	Senior	
2009–10	Luke Babbitt	Nevada	PF	Sophomore	
2010–11	Tai Wesley	Utah State	PF	Senior	
2011–12	Deonte Burton	Nevada	PG	Sophomore	
2012–13	Kyle Barone	Idaho	C	Senior	
2013–14	Daniel Mullings	New Mexico State	SG	Junior	
2014–15	Martez Harrison	Kansas City	SG / PG	Sophomore	
2015–16	Pascal Siakam	New Mexico State	PF	Sophomore	
2016–17	Ian Baker	New Mexico State	PG	Senior	
2017–18	Jemerrio Jones	New Mexico State	PF	Senior	
2018–19	Jake Toolson	Utah Valley	SG	Junior	
2019–20	Milan Acquaah	California Baptist	SG	Junior	
2020–21	Fardaws Aimaq	Utah Valley	C	Sophomore	
2021–22	Teddy Allen	New Mexico State	SG	Junior	
2022–23	Qua Grant	Sam Houston	PG	Senior	
2023–24	Tyon Grant-Foster	Grand Canyon	SG	Graduate	
2024–25	Dominick Nelson	Utah Valley	PG	Junior	
2025–26	Dominique Daniels Jr.	California Baptist	PG	Senior	

== Winners by school ==
School (year joined)	Winners	Years
Utah (1962) (Note: BYU, Colorado State, New Mexico, San Diego State, Utah and Wyoming all left in 1999 to become charter members of the Mountain West Conference (MW). Of these schools: BYU and Utah are now in the Big 12 Conference.; Colorado State and San Diego State are now in the Pac-12 Conference.; New Mexico and Wyoming remain in the MW.)	7	1983^{†}, 1991, 1993, 1995, 1996, 1997^{†}, 1999^{†}
Nevada (2000) (Note: Nevada and Fresno State left for the MW in 2012. Fresno State is now in the Pac-12.)	6	2004, 2005, 2006, 2007, 2010, 2012
New Mexico State (2005) (Note: New Mexico State and Sam Houston left for Conference USA in 2023.)	5	2014, 2016, 2017, 2018, 2022
BYU (1962)	4	1981, 1983^{†}, 1985, 1988
Fresno State (1992)	3	2000, 2001, 2002
San Diego State (1978)	3	1983^{†}, 1984, 1986
Utah State (2005) (Note: Seven schools left the WAC for other conferences in 2013: Denver joined The Summit League after only one year in the WAC, and joined the West Coast Conference in 2026.; Louisiana Tech and UTSA joined Conference USA (CUSA), the latter after spending only one year in the WAC. Louisiana Tech moved from there to the Sun Belt Conference in 2026.; San Jose State and Utah State joined the MW; Utah State moved from there to the Pac-12 in 2026.; Texas State and UT Arlington joined the Sun Belt after only one year in the WAC. Texas State also joined the Pac-12 in 2026.; UT Arlington rejoined the WAC in 2022, and it remained a member through the conference's 2026 rebranding as the UAC.)	3	2008, 2009, 2011
Utah Valley (2013) (Note: California Baptist and Utah Valley joined the Big West Conference in 2026.)	3	2019, 2021, 2025
Wyoming (1962)	3	1982, 1987, 1992
California Baptist (2018)	2	2020, 2026
New Mexico (1962)	2	1994, 1998^{†}
SMU (1996) (Note: SMU and UTEP both left in 2005 to join CUSA. SMU joined the American Athletic Conference (now the American Conference) in 2013 and moved to the Atlantic Coast Conference in 2024. UTEP joined the MW in 2026.)	2	1999^{†}, 2003
Colorado State (1967)	1	1990
Grand Canyon (2013) (Note: Grand Canyon joined the MW in 2025.)	1	2024
Hawaiʻi (1979) (Note: Hawaiʻi left for the Big West in 2012, and joined its football team in the MW in 2026.)	1	1997
Idaho (2005) (Note: Idaho left the WAC in 2014 for the Big Sky.)	1	2013
Kansas City (2013) (Note: The University of Missouri–Kansas City, which left the WAC after the 2019–20 season to rejoin its former conference home of the Summit League, changed its athletic brand to "Kansas City" after the 2018–19 season.)	1	2015
Sam Houston (2021)	1	2023
TCU (1996) (Note: TCU left in 2001 for CUSA. It is now in the Big 12.)	1	1998^{†}
UTEP (1967)	1	1989
Abilene Christian (2021) (Note: The WAC memberships of Abilene Christian and Tarleton State transferred to the UAC in 2026.)	0	—
Boise State (2001) (Note: Boise State left in 2011 for the MW, and moved to the Pac-12 in 2026.)	0	—
Chicago State (2013) (Note: Chicago State left the WAC in 2022, becoming a Division I independent. It joined the Northeast Conference, now officially known as the NEC, in 2024.)	0	—
CSU Bakersfield (2013) (Note: CSU Bakersfield, now in the process of an athletic rebranding as Bakersfield, left for the Big West in 2020.)	0	—
Denver (2012)	0	—
Lamar (2021) (Note: Lamar left the WAC in 2022 after only one season, returning to its previous home of the Southland Conference (SLC).)	0	—
Louisiana Tech (2001)	0	—
San Jose State (1996)	0	—
Seattle (2012) (Note: Seattle joined the West Coast Conference in 2025.)	0	—
Southern Utah (2022) (Note: Southern Utah and Utah Tech joined the Big Sky Conference in 2026.)	0	—
Stephen F. Austin (2021) (Note: Stephen F. Austin returned to its previous home of the SLC in 2024.)	0	—
Tarleton State (2020)	0	—
Texas State (2012)	0	—
UT Arlington (2012/2022)	0	—
Utah Tech (Note: Known as Dixie State before the 2022–23 season.) (2020)	0	—
UTRGV (2013) (Note: UTRGV left the WAC for the SLC after the 2023–24 season.) (Note: The University of Texas Rio Grande Valley (UTRGV) entered into full operation in 2015 with the merger of the University of Texas–Pan American (UTPA), which had joined the WAC in 2013, and the University of Texas at Brownsville. Because UTRGV directly inherited the UTPA athletic program. it is credited with all UTPA historic records, and maintained UTPA's WAC membership until joining the SLC.)	0	—
UTSA (2012)	0	—
