= List of Indiana Hoosiers basketball players =

This is a list of Indiana Hoosiers basketball players who have attained notability through their performance in the sport of basketball and other endeavors. The list is presented in alphabetical order but is sortable by the years and positions at which they played.

== List of current and former players ==
Name	Position	Hometown	First season	Last season	Notes
Tom Abernethy	Forward	South Bend, Indiana	1973	1976	Starter on the undefeated 1976 National Championship team. 3rd-round pick in 1976 NBA draft.
Steve Alford	Guard	New Castle, Indiana	1984	1987	1983 Indiana Mr. Basketball. Member of the 1987 National Championship team. Was a 1987 Consensus All-American. 2nd-round pick in 1987 NBA draft.
OG Anunoby	Forward	Jefferson City, Missouri	2016	2017	First-round pick in the 2017 NBA draft.
Damon Bailey	Guard	Bedford, Indiana	1991	1994	1990 Indiana Mr. Basketball. 1990 McDonald's All-American. 1991 Big Ten Freshman of the Year. Member of the 1992 Final Four team.
Walt Bellamy	Center	New Bern, North Carolina	1959	1961 Frank Daly (1960, 1961) guard	2-time All-Big Ten (1960, 1961). 1st-round pick in 1961 NBA draft. 1993 National Basketball Hall of Fame inductee as a player.
Kent Benson	Center	New Castle, Indiana	1974	1977	1973 Indiana Mr. Basketball. Starter on the undefeated 1976 National Championship team. 1976 Big Ten Player of the Year. 2-time All American. IU's first overall #1 NBA draft pick.
Uwe Blab	Center	Munich, Germany	1982	1985	1st-round pick in 1985 NBA draft.
Tom Bolyard	Forward	Fort Wayne, Indiana	1961	1963	1963 All-Big Ten Honoree.
Quinn Buckner	Guard	Phoenix, Illinois	1973	1976	Starter on the undefeated 1976 National Championship team. One of only seven players in history to win an NCAA Championship, an NBA Championship, and an Olympic gold medal. 1st-round pick in 1976 NBA draft.
Calbert Cheaney	Forward	Evansville, Indiana	1990	1993	Member of the 1992 Final Four team. 1993 National Player of the Year, Big Ten Player of the Year, Consensus All-American. All-time leading scorer at IU with 2,613 points.
Everett Dean	Center	Salem, Indiana	1918	1921	1921 Helms Athletic Foundation All-America team. IU basketball head coach from 1924 to 1938. 1966 National Basketball Hall of Fame inductee as a coach.
Archie Dees	Guard	Mount Carmel, Illinois	1955	1958	2-time Big Ten Most Valuable Player (1957, 1958). 1st-round pick in 1958 NBA draft.
Steve Downing	Center	Indianapolis, Indiana	1970	1973	Member of the 1973 Final Four team. 1973 Chicago Tribune Silver Basketball Big Ten Player award honoree. 1st-round pick in 1973 NBA draft.
Jay Edwards	Guard/Forward	Marion, Indiana	1987	1989	1987 Co-Indiana Mr. Basketball. 1987 McDonald's All-American. 1989 Big Ten Player of the Year. 2nd-round pick in 1989 NBA draft.
Brian Evans	Forward	Terre Haute, Indiana	1993	1996	1996 Big Ten Player of the Year. 1st-round pick in 1996 NBA draft.
Yogi Ferrell	Guard	Indianapolis, Indiana	2013	Current	2012 McDonald's All-American. One of only 5 Hoosiers to have 1,000 career points, 400 career assists, and 300 career rebounds.
Dane Fife	Guard	Clarkston, Michigan	1999	2002	1998 McDonald's All-American. 2002 Co-Big Ten Defensive Player of the Year. Member of the 2002 National Championship Runner-up team.
Bill Garrett	Center/Forward	Shelbyville, Indiana	1949	1951	1947 Indiana Mr. Basketball. IU's first African American player.
Eric Gordon	Guard	Indianapolis, Indiana	2007	2008	2007 Indiana Mr. Basketball; 2007 McDonald's All-American; 2008 Big Ten Freshman of the Year. 1st-round pick in 2008 NBA draft; 2017 NBA Sixth Man Award.
Greg Graham	Guard	Indianapolis, Indiana	1990	1993	1989 McDonald's All-American. Member of the 1992 Final Four team. 1st-round pick in 1993 NBA draft.
Steve Green	Forward	Sellersburg, Indiana	1972	1975	Member of the 1973 Final Four team. 2-time All-American (1974, 1975). 2nd-round pick in 1975 NBA draft.
A. J. Guyton	Guard	Peoria, Illinois	1997	2000	1997 Big Ten Freshman of the Year. 2000 Co-Big Ten Player of the Year. 2000 Consensus All-American. 2nd-round pick in 2000 NBA draft.
Kirk Haston	Forward/Center	Lobelville, Tennessee	1999	2001	1st-round pick in 2001 NBA draft.
Alan Henderson	Forward	Indianapolis, Indiana	1992	1995	1991 McDonald's All-American. Member of the 1992 Final Four team. 1st-round pick in 1995 NBA draft.
Jordan Hulls	Guard	Bloomington, Indiana	2010	2013	2009 Indiana Mr. Basketball. Led IU to back-to-back Sweet Sixteen appearances (2012, 2013).
Jared Jeffries	Forward	Bloomington, Indiana	2001	2002	2000 Indiana Mr. Basketball. 2000 McDonald's All-American. 2001 Big Ten Freshman of the Year. 2002 Big Ten Player of the Year. Member of the 2002 National Championship Runner-up team. 1st-round pick in 2002 NBA draft.
Ted Kitchel	Forward	Galveston, Indiana	1979	1983	Member of the 1979 NIT Championship team. Member of the 1981 National Championship team. 2-time All-American (1982, 1983). 2nd-round pick in 1983 NBA draft.
John Laskowski	Guard/Forward	South Bend, Indiana	1973	1975	Nicknamed "Super-Sub" for superb sixth man performances. 2nd-round pick in 1975 NBA draft.
Bobby Leonard	Guard	Terre Haute, Indiana	1952	1954	Member of the 1953 National Championship team. 2nd-round pick in 1954 NBA draft. 2014 National Basketball Hall of Fame inductee as a coach.
Scott May	Forward	Sandusky, Ohio	1974	1976	Starter of the undefeated 1976 National Championship team. 1976 Player of the Year. 2-time Consensus All-American (1975, 1976). 1st-round pick in 1976 NBA draft.
Branch McCracken	Center	Monrovia, Indiana	1928	1930	All-American (1930). IU basketball head coach from 1938 to 1943; 1946–1965. 1960 National Basketball Hall of Fame inductee as a player.
George McGinnis	Forward	Indianapolis, Indiana	1970	1971	1969 Indiana Mr. Basketball. 3rd-round pick in 1973 NBA draft.
Victor Oladipo	Guard	Upper Marlboro, Maryland	2011	2013	2013 Player of the Year. 2013 Big Ten Defensive Player of the Year. 1st-round pick in 2013 NBA draft.
Jimmy Rayl	Guard	Kokomo, Indiana	1961	1963	1959 Indiana Mr. Basketball. 2-time single-game scoring record of 56 points. 3rd-round pick in 1963 NBA draft.
Don Schlundt	Center	South Bend, Indiana	1952	1955	3-time All-American (1953, 1954, 1955). Member of the 1953 National Championship team. 2nd-round pick in 1955 NBA draft.
Keith Smart	Guard	Baton Rouge, Louisiana	1987	1988	Member of the 1987 National Championship team. Famous for "the shot," a final-seconds, game-winning basket over Syracuse. 2nd-round pick in 1988 NBA draft.
Isiah Thomas	Guard	Chicago, Illinois	1980	1981	1979 McDonald's All-American. Member of the 1981 National Championship team. Consensus All-American (1981). 1st-round pick in 1981 NBA draft. 2000 National Basketball Hall of Fame inductee as a player.
Ray Tolbert	Forward/Center	Anderson, Indiana	1978	1981	1977 Indiana Mr. Basketball. 1977 McDonald's All-American. Member of the 1979 NIT Championship team. Member of the 1981 National Championship team. 1st-round pick in 1981 NBA draft.
Landon Turner	Forward/Center	Indianapolis, Indiana	1979	1982	1978 McDonald's All-American. Member of the 1979 NIT Championship team. Member of the 1981 National Championship team. 10th-round pick in 1982 NBA draft.
Dick Van Arsdale	Forward	Indianapolis, Indiana	1963	1965	1961 Co-Indiana Mr. Basketball. 2nd-round pick in 1965 NBA draft.
Tom Van Arsdale	Forward	Indianapolis, Indiana	1963	1965	1961 Co-Indiana Mr. Basketball. 2nd-round pick in 1965 NBA draft.
Christian Watford	Forward	Birmingham, Alabama	2010	2013	Famous for the "Wat Shot," which led to a last second victory over #1-ranked Kentucky.
Lou Watson	Guard/Forward	Jeffersonville, Indiana	1947	1950	All-Big Ten (1950). All-American (1950). Indiana basketball head coach from 1965 to 1971.
D. J. White	Guard	Tuscaloosa, Alabama	2005	2008	2004 McDonald's All-American. 2005 Big Ten Freshman of the Year. 2008 Big Ten Player of the Year. 1st-round pick in 2008 NBA draft.
Bobby Wilkerson	Guard/Forward	Anderson, Indiana	1974	1976	Starter of the undefeated 1976 National Championship team. 1st-round pick in 1976 NBA draft.
Randy Wittman	Guard/Forward	Indianapolis, Indiana	1979	1983	Member of the 1979 NIT Championship team. Member of the 1981 National Championship team. 1st-round pick in 1983 NBA draft.
Mike Woodson	Forward	Indianapolis, Indiana	1977	1980	Member of the 1979 NIT Championship team. 1st-round pick in 1980 NBA draft.
Bracey Wright	Guard	The Colony, Texas	2003	2005	2002 McDonald's All-American. All-Big Ten (2005). 2nd-round pick in 2005 NBA draft.
Joby Wright	Forward	Savannah, Georgia	1970	1972	All-Big Ten (1972). 2nd-round pick in 1972 NBA draft.
Cody Zeller	Forward	Washington, Indiana	2012	2013	2011 Indiana Mr. Basketball. 2011 McDonald's All-American. 2012 Big Ten Freshman of the Year. All-Big Ten (2013). 1st-round pick in 2013 NBA draft.
