= List of Indiana Hoosiers in the NBA draft =

The Indiana Hoosiers men's basketball team, representing the Indiana University, has had 78 players drafted into the National Basketball Association (NBA) since the league began holding drafts in 1947.

Each NBA franchise seeks to add new players through an annual draft. The NBA uses a draft lottery to determine the first three picks of the NBA draft; the 14 teams that did not make the playoffs the previous year are eligible to participate. After the first three picks are decided, the rest of the teams pick in reverse order of their win–loss record. To be eligible for the NBA draft, a player in the United States must be at least 19 years old during the calendar year of the draft and must be at least one year removed from the graduation of his high school class. From 1967 until the ABA–NBA merger in 1976, the American Basketball Association (ABA) held its own draft.

== Key ==
F	Forward	C	Center	G	Guard

== Players selected ==
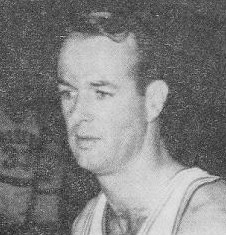
Bobby "Slick" Leonard was drafted 10th overall by the Baltimore Bullets in the 1954 NBA draft.

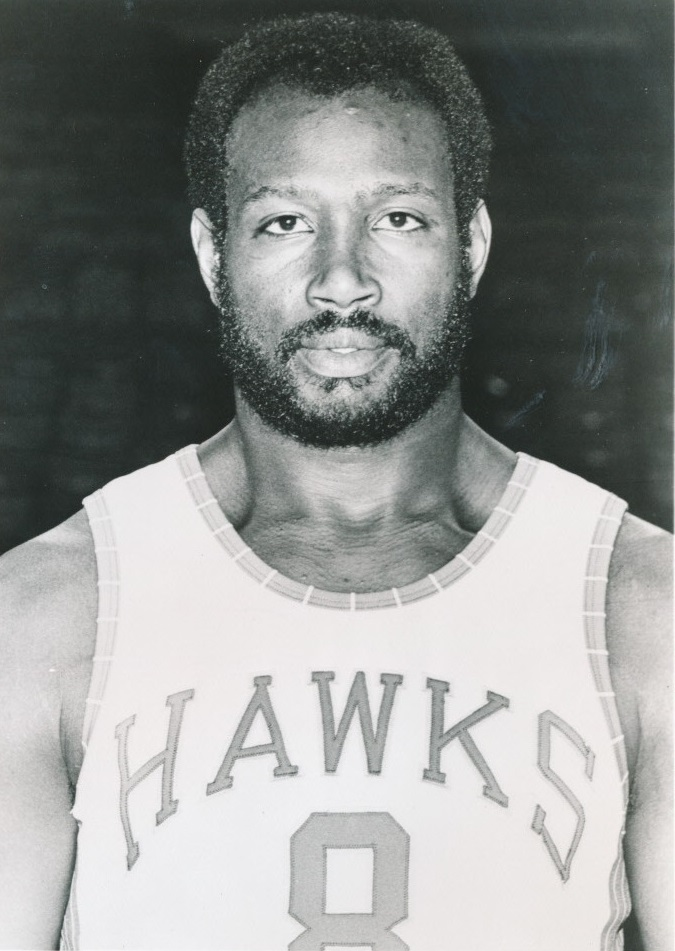
Walt Bellamy was drafted as the #1 overall pick by the Chicago Zephyrs in the 1961 NBA draft.

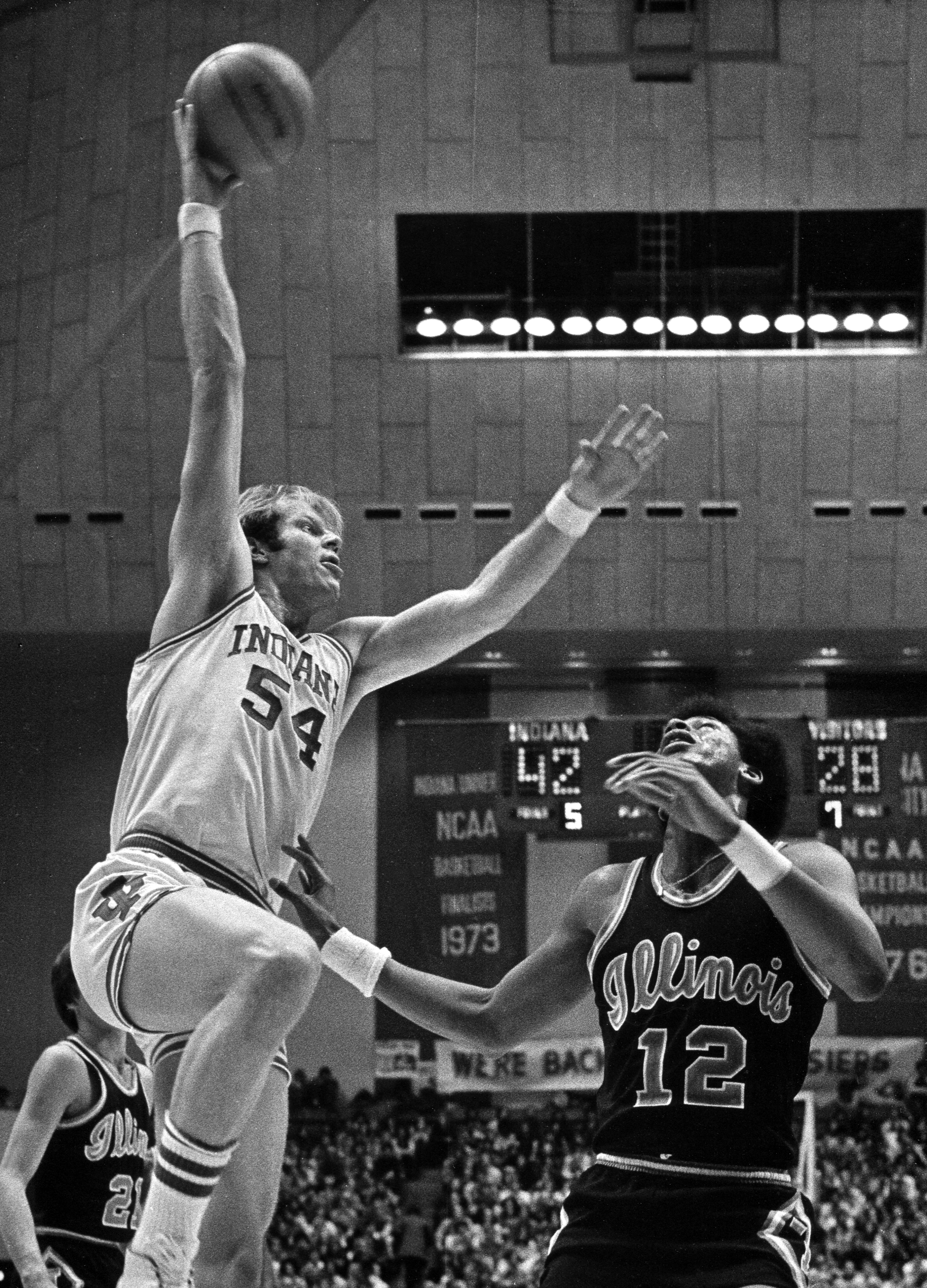
Kent Benson was drafted by the Milwaukee Bucks in the 1977 NBA draft.

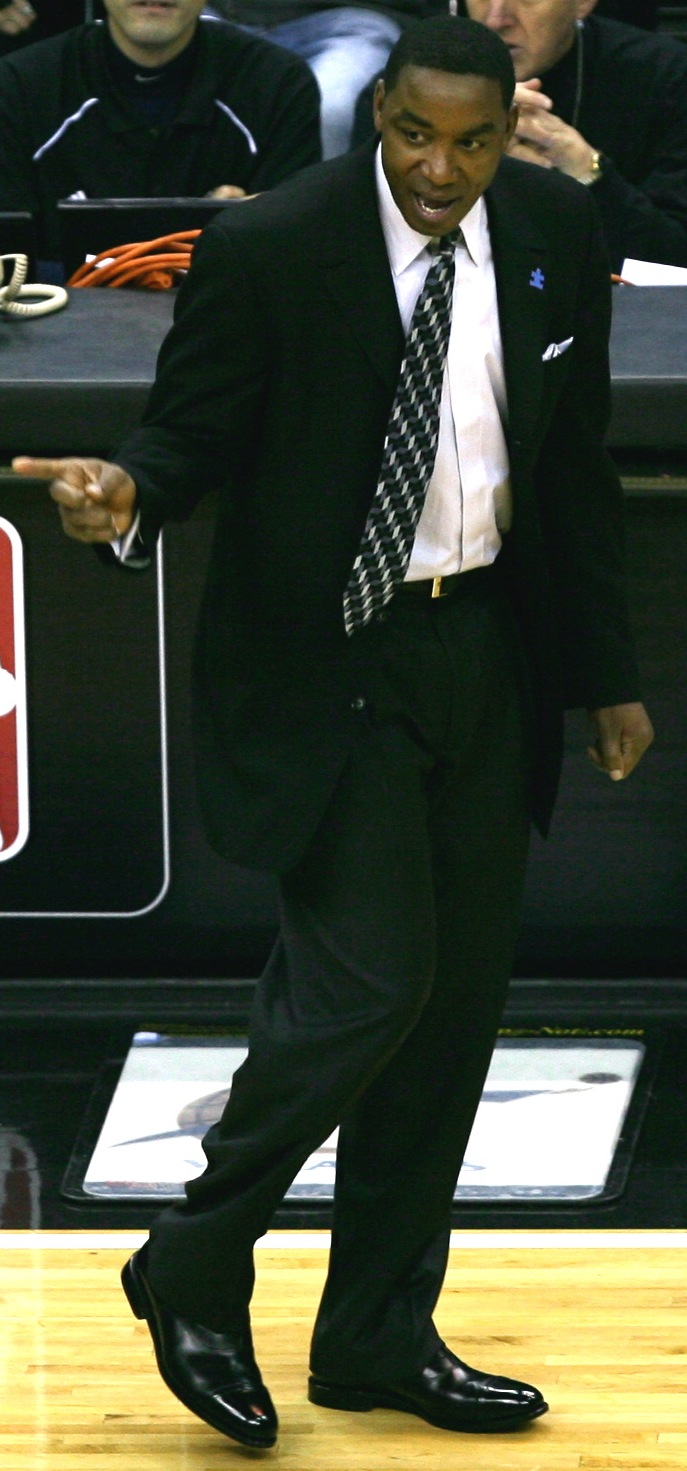
After leading IU to its 4th national championship, Isiah Thomas was drafted by the Detroit Pistons in the 1981 NBA draft.

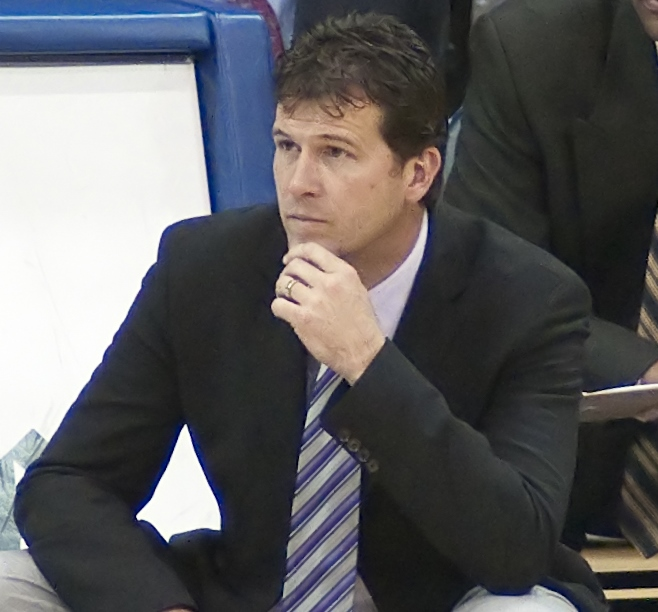
Steve Alford was drafted by the Dallas Mavericks in 1987 after leading IU to its 5th national championship.

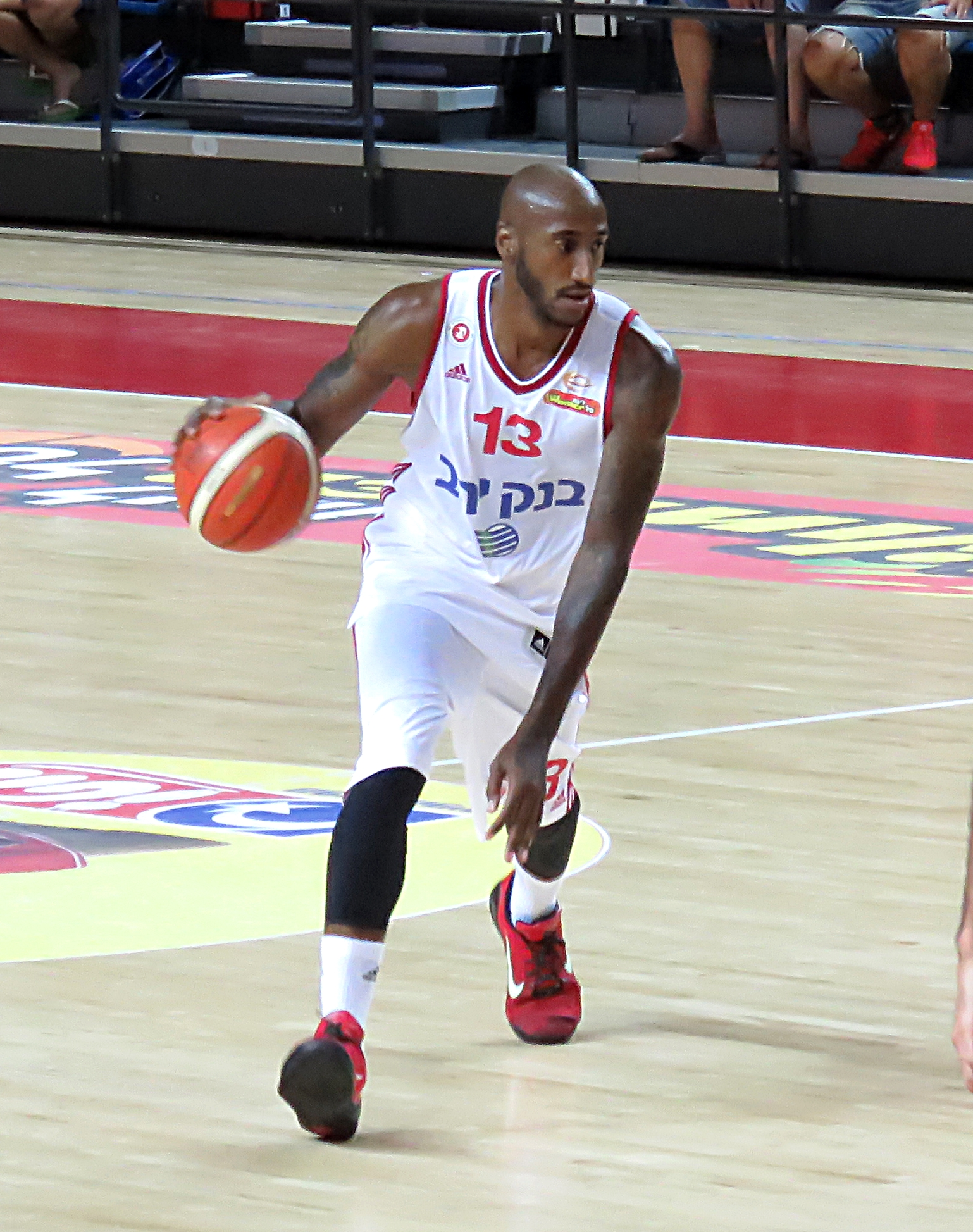
Bracey Wright was drafted in the 2nd round by the Minnesota Timberwolves in the 2005 NBA draft.

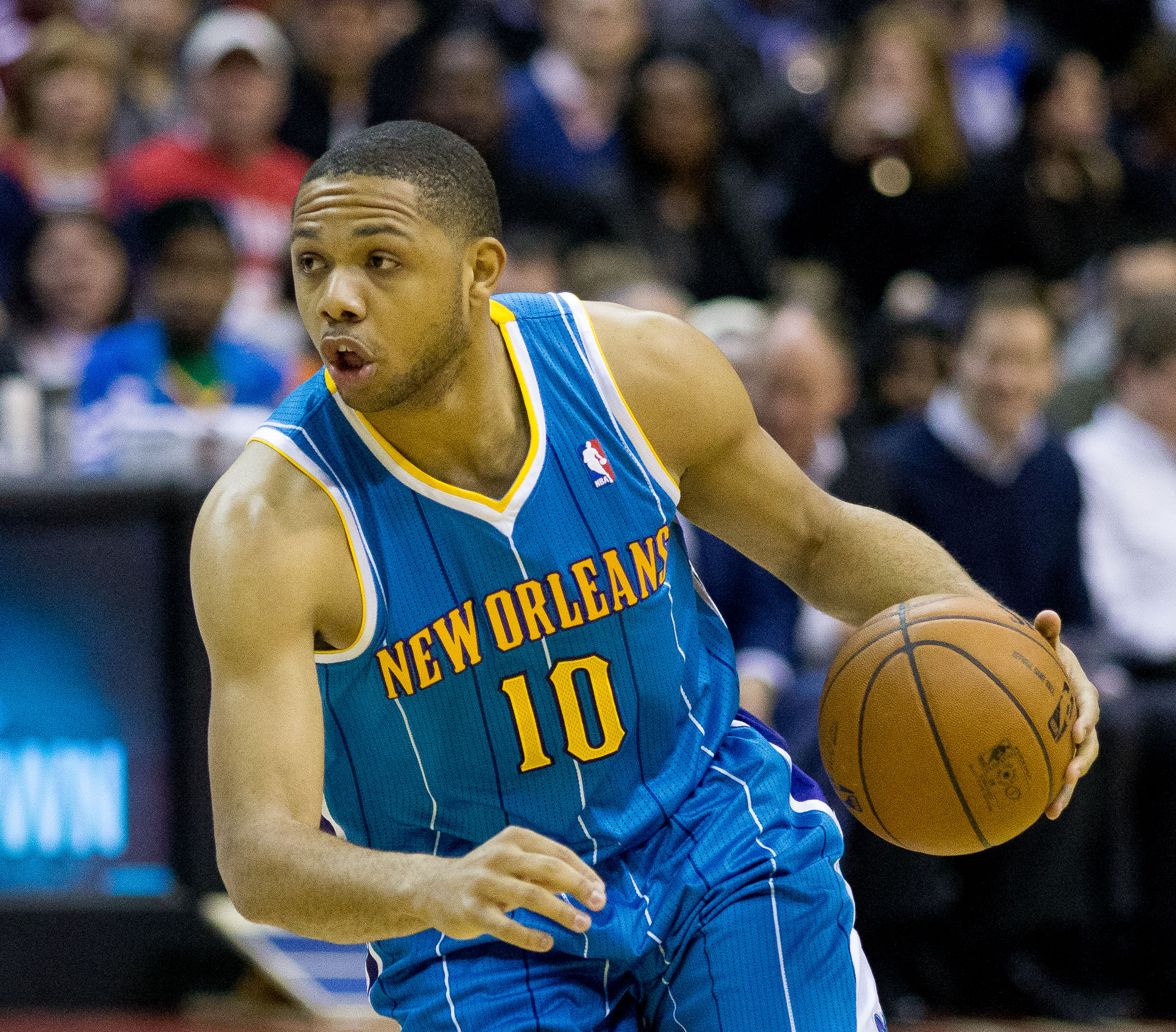
Eric Gordon was a 1st round draft pick for the Los Angeles Clippers in the 2008 NBA draft.

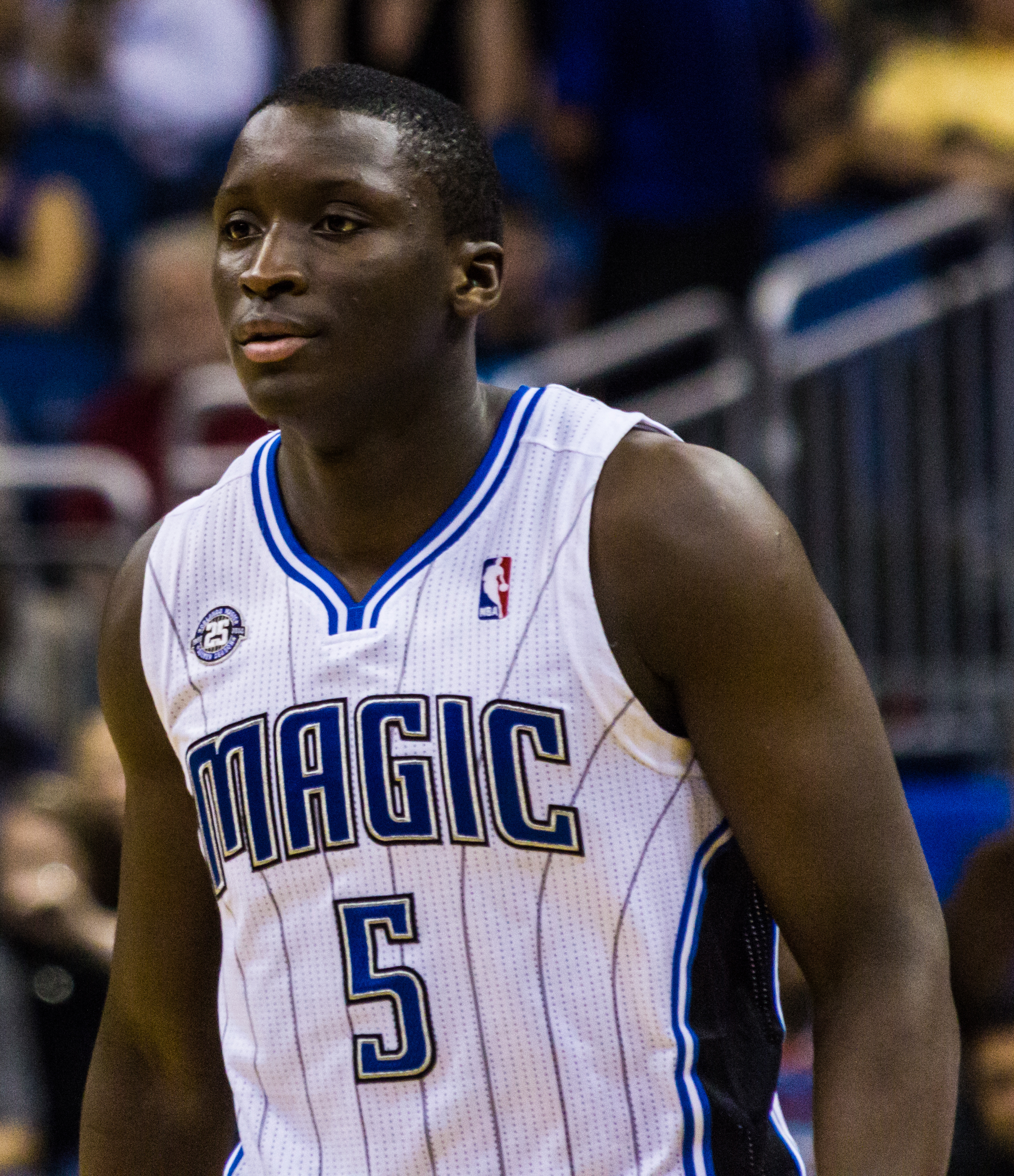
Victor Oladipo was drafted as the #2 overall pick by the Orlando Magic in the 2013 NBA draft.

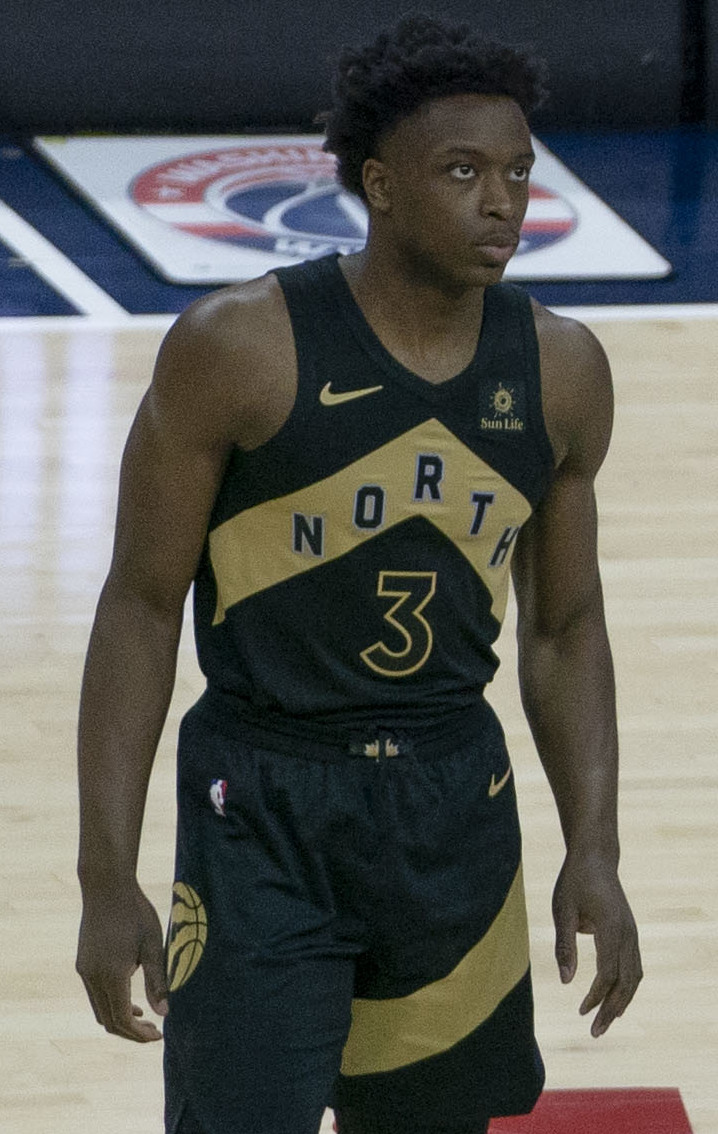
OG Anunoby was drafted by the Toronto Raptors in the 1st round as the #23 pick in the 2017 NBA draft.

Year	Round	Overall pick	Player name	Position	NBA team
1947	No selections				
1948	No selections				
1949	No selections				
1950	8	—	Jerry Stuteville	F	Indianapolis Olympians
1950	3	—	Lou Watson	G	Chicago Stags
1951	2	16	Bill Garrett	C	Boston Celtics
1951	4	32	Bill Tosheff	F	Indianapolis Olympians
1952	7	69	Sam Miranda	G	Rochester Royals
1953	No selections				
1954	6	49	Charlie Kraak	F	Fort Wayne Pistons
1954	5	37	Lou Scott	C	Baltimore Bullets
1954	2	15	Dick Farley	F	Syracuse Nationals
1954	2	10	Bobby Leonard	G	Baltimore Bullets
1955	2	14	Don Schlundt	C	Syracuse Nationals
1956	11	77	Wally Choice	F	St. Louis Hawks
1957	11	79	Dick Neal	F	Boston Celtics
1958	1	2	Archie Dees	F/C	Cincinnati Royals
1959	No selections				
1960	12	84	Bob Wilkinson	G	St. Louis Hawks
1960	2	14	Frank Radovich	F/C	St. Louis Hawks
1961	2	16	Ron Horn	F	St. Louis Hawks
1961	1	1	Walt Bellamy	C	Chicago Zephyrs
1962	No selections				
1963	3	22	Jimmy Rayl	G	Cincinnati Royals
1963	3	19	Tom Bolyard	G	Baltimore Bullets
1964	No selections				
1965	3	24	Jon McGlocklin	G/F	Cincinnati Royals
1965	2	11	Tom Van Arsdale	G/F	Detroit Pistons
1965	2	10	Dick Van Arsdale	G/F	New York Knicks
1966	No selections				
1967	1	—	Erv Inniger	G	Minnesota Muskies
1968	9	111	Butch Joyner	G/F	Cincinnati Royals
1969	8	105	Bill DeHeer	F/C	San Diego Rockets
1970	10	162	Ken Johnson	C	Cleveland Cavaliers
1970	6	94	Joe Cooke	G	Cleveland Cavaliers
1971	14	208	Jim Harris	G	Cleveland Cavaliers
1971	13	199	Lee McCollough	—	San Diego Rockets
1972	2	18	Joby Wright	F	Seattle SuperSonics
1973	8	125	John Ritter	G	Cleveland Cavaliers
1973	3	22	George McGinnis	F	Philadelphia 76ers
1973	1	17	Steve Downing	C	Boston Celtics
1974	No selections				
1975	2	32	John Laskowski	G	Chicago Bulls
1975	2	30	Steve Green	G	Chicago Bulls
1976	3	43	Tom Abernethy	F	Los Angeles Lakers
1976	1	11	Bobby Wilkerson	G/F	Seattle SuperSonics
1976	1	7	Quinn Buckner	G	Milwaukee Bucks
1976	1	2	Scott May	F	Chicago Bulls
1977	1	1	Kent Benson	C	Milwaukee Bucks
1978	2	27	Wayne Radford	G	Indiana Pacers
1979	No selections				
1980	2	37	Butch Carter	G	Los Angeles Lakers
1980	1	12	Mike Woodson	G/F	New York Knicks
1981	8	180	Steve Risley	F	Phoenix Suns
1981	5	115	Glen Grunwald	F	Boston Celtics
1981	1	18	Ray Tolbert	F	New Jersey Nets
1981	1	2	Isiah Thomas	G	Detroit Pistons
1982	10	225	Landon Turner	F/C	Boston Celtics
1983	7	141	Tony Brown	G	Indiana Pacers
1983	4	78	Steve Bouchie	F	Detroit Pistons
1983	2	41	Ted Kitchel	F	Milwaukee Bucks
1983	2	40	Jim Thomas	G	Indiana Pacers
1983	1	22	Randy Wittman	G/F	Washington Bullets
1984	No selections				
1985	1	17	Uwe Blab	C	Dallas Mavericks
1986	No selections				
1987	6	120	Daryl Thomas	F/C	Sacramento Kings
1987	2	26	Steve Alford	G	Dallas Mavericks
1988	2	41	Keith Smart	G	Golden State Warriors
1988	2	38	Dean Garrett	C	Phoenix Suns
1989	2	33	Jay Edwards	G	Los Angeles Clippers
1990	No selections				
1991	No selections				
1992	No selections				
1993	1	17	Greg Graham	G	Charlotte Hornets
1993	1	6	Calbert Cheaney	G/F	Washington Bullets
1994	2	44	Damon Bailey	G	Indiana Pacers
1995	1	16	Alan Henderson	F/C	Atlanta Hawks
1996	1	27	Brian Evans	F	Orlando Magic
1997	No selections				
1998	2	46	Andrae Patterson	F/C	Minnesota Timberwolves
1999	No selections				
2000	2	32	A. J. Guyton	G	Chicago Bulls
2001	1	16	Kirk Haston	F	Charlotte Hornets
2002	1	11	Jared Jeffries	F	Washington Wizards
2003	No selections				
2004	No selections				
2005	2	47	Bracey Wright	G	Minnesota Timberwolves
2006	No selections				
2007	No selections				
2008	1	29	D. J. White	F	Detroit Pistons
2008	1	7	Eric Gordon	G	Los Angeles Clippers
2009	No selections				
2010	No selections				
2011	No selections				
2012	No selections				
2013	1	4	Cody Zeller	F	Charlotte Bobcats
2013	1	2	Victor Oladipo	G	Orlando Magic
2014	1	9	Noah Vonleh	F/C	Charlotte Hornets
2015	No selections				
2016	No selections				
2017	1	23	OG Anunoby	F	Toronto Raptors
2017	2	42	Thomas Bryant	F	Utah Jazz
2018	No selections				
2019	1	14	Romeo Langford	G	Boston Celtics
2020	No selections				
2021	No selections				
2022	No selections				
2023	1	17	Jalen Hood-Schifino	G	Los Angeles Lakers
2023	2	57	Trayce Jackson-Davis	F	Golden State Warriors
2024	1	15	Kel'el Ware	C	Miami Heat
