= 1972–73 Kansas Jayhawks men's basketball team =

American college basketball season

1972–73 Kansas Jayhawks men's basketball
- Conference: Big Eight Conference
- Record: 8–18 (4–10 Big 8)
- Head coach: Ted Owens (9th season)
- Assistant coaches: Jim Karabestsos (1st season); Sam Miranda (7th season)
- Captain: Wilson Barrow
- Home arena: Allen Fieldhouse

1972–73 Big Eight Conference men's basketball standings
	Conf.				Overall
Team	W		L	PCT	W		L	PCT
No. 9 Kansas State	12	–	2	.857	23	–	5	.821
No. 15 Missouri	9	–	5	.643	21	–	6	.778
Colorado	9	–	5	.643	13	–	13	.500
Oklahoma	8	–	6	.571	18	–	8	.692
Iowa State	7	–	7	.500	16	–	10	.615
Nebraska	7	–	7	.500	9	–	17	.346
Kansas	4	–	10	.286	8	–	18	.308
Oklahoma State	3	–	11	.214	7	–	19	.269
Rankings from AP Poll

The 1972–73 Kansas Jayhawks men's basketball team represented the University of Kansas during the 1972–73 NCAA Division I men's basketball season.

== Roster ==
- Rick Suttle
- Tom Kivisto
- Dale Greenlee
- Danny Knight
- Tommie Smith
- Marshall Rogers
- Wilson Barrow
- Dave Taynor
- Mike Fiddelke
- Dale Haase
- Nino Samuel
- Derrick Glanton
- D. Rogers

== Schedule ==
Date time, TV	Rank^{#}	Opponent^{#}	Result	Record	Site city, state
December 1*		Vanderbilt	L 64-72	0-1	Allen Fieldhouse; Lawrence, KS
December 5*		Indiana	L 55-72	0-2	Allen Fieldhouse; Lawrence, KS
December 7*		Murray State	W 69-63	1-2	Allen Fieldhouse; Lawrence, KS
December 9*		Iowa	L 56-69	1-3	Allen Fieldhouse; Lawrence, KS
December 11*		Xavier	W 61-54	2-3	Allen Fieldhouse; Lawrence, KS
December 15*		Texas Tech	W 67-51	3-3	Allen Fieldhouse; Lawrence, KS
December 16*		San Francisco	W 60-58	4-3	Allen Fieldhouse; Lawrence, KS
December 23		at Kentucky	L 71-77	4-4	Memorial Coliseum; Lexington, KY
December 28		vs. No. 16 Kansas State; Sunflower Showdown	L 70-91	4-5	Kemper Arena; Kansas City, MO
December 29		vs. Nebraska	L 72-74	4-6	Kemper Arena; Kansas City, MO
December 30		vs. Colorado	L 68-71	4-7	Kemper Arena; Kansas City, MO
January 7*		at Notre Dame	L 64-66	4-8	Joyce Center; Notre Dame, IN
January 13		Colorado	W 67-58	5-8 (1-0)	Allen Fieldhouse; Lawrence, KS
January 20		at No. 8 Missouri; Border War	L 72-75	5-9 (1-1)	Hearnes Center; Columbia, MO
January 23*		No. 18 Kansas State; Sunflower Showdown	L 68-77	5-10 (1-2)	Allen Fieldhouse; Lawrence, KS
January 27		at Iowa State	W 90-78	6-10 (2-2)	James H. Hilton Coliseum; Ames, IA
February 3		Oklahoma	W 76-69	7-10 (3-2)	Allen Fieldhouse; Lawrence, KS
February 10		Nebraska	L 46-59	7-11 (3-3)	Allen Fieldhouse; Lawrence, KS
February 13		at No. 15 Kansas State; Sunflower Showdown	L 66-67	7-12 (3-4)	Ahearn Field House; Manhattan, KS
February 17		Oklahoma State	W 75-66	8-12 (4-4)	Allen Fieldhouse; Lawrence, KS
February 19		at Colorado	L 66-72	8-13 (4-5)	Balch Fieldhouse; Boulder, CO
February 24		at Nebraska	L 59-62	8-14 (4-6)	Nebraska Coliseum; Lincoln, NE
February 27		No. 13 Missouri; Border War	L 63-79	8-15 (4-7)	Allen Fieldhouse; Lawrence, KS
March 3		at Oklahoma	L 58-60	8-16 (4-8)	McCasland Field House; Norman, OK
March 5		at Oklahoma State	L 87-94	8-17 (4-9)	Gallagher-Iba Arena; Stillwater, OK
March 10; 1:10 pm, Big Eight		Iowa State	L 65-89	8-18 (4-10)	Allen Fieldhouse; Lawrence, KS
*Non-conference game. ^{#}Rankings from AP Poll. (#) Tournament seedings in parentheses.
