= 1972–73 Illinois Fighting Illini men's basketball team =

American college basketball season

1972–73 Illinois Fighting Illini men's basketball
- Conference: Big Ten Conference
- Record: 14–10 (8–6 Big Ten)
- Head coach: Harv Schmidt (6th season)
- Assistant coaches: Dick Campbell (6th season); Marshall Stoner (1st season)
- MVP: Nick Weatherspoon
- Captain: Nick Weatherspoon
- Home arena: Assembly Hall

1972–73 Big Ten Conference men's basketball standings
	Conf.				Overall
Team	W		L	PCT	W		L	PCT
No. 6 Indiana	11	–	3	.786	22	–	6	.786
No. 10 Minnesota	10	–	4	.714	21	–	5	.808
Purdue	8	–	6	.571	15	–	9	.625
Illinois	8	–	6	.571	14	–	10	.583
Ohio State	8	–	6	.571	14	–	10	.583
Iowa	6	–	8	.429	13	–	11	.542
Michigan	6	–	8	.429	13	–	11	.542
Michigan State	6	–	8	.429	13	–	11	.542
Wisconsin	5	–	9	.357	11	–	13	.458
Northwestern	2	–	12	.143	5	–	19	.208
Rankings from AP Poll

"1972-73 Fighting Illini men's basketball team"

The 1972–73 Illinois Fighting Illini men's basketball team represented the University of Illinois.

== Regular season ==
Head coach Harv Schmidt entered his sixth season with the Fighting Illini with high expectations. The 1971–72 team returned one of the top senior athletes in the country, Nick Weatherspoon. As a sophomore, Weatherspoon scored 381 points, averaging 16.5 points per game, while collecting 246 rebounds. His junior year was even better, scoring 500 total points, averaging 20.8 points and pulling down 262 rebounds. Nothing, however, would be better than Weatherspoon's senior year. During this season he would score 600 points, averaging 25.0 points per game, while amassing 295 total rebounds. Weatherspoon remains as number 11 on the all-time leading scores list at the University of Illinois, only surpassed by players that completed four years of varsity basketball. His three-year average of 20.9 points per game and 11.3 rebounds per game still remain number one for the Fighting Illini.

The 1972–73 team's starting lineup included Weatherspoon and Rick Schmidt at the forward spots, Jeff Dawson and Otho Tucker as guards and Nick Conner at center. The roster included the teams first 7 foot tall player, Bill Rucks a freshman from Waukegan High School.

=== Roster ===
1972–73 Illinois Fighting Illini men's basketball team
Players
Coaches

Pos.	#	Name	Height	Weight	Year	Previous school	Hometown
G	10	Garvin Roberson	6 ft 4 in (1.93 m)	190 lb (86 kg)	Jr	Elkhart Central High School	Elkhart, Indiana
G	11	Dave Roberts	6 ft 2 in (1.88 m)	175 lb (79 kg)	So	Proviso East High School	Maywood, Illinois
F	12	Nick Weatherspoon (C)	6 ft 6 in (1.98 m)	185 lb (84 kg)	Jr	McKinley High School	Canton, Ohio
G	14	C.J. Schroeder	6 ft 4 in (1.93 m)	195 lb (88 kg)	Jr	Davenport West High School	Davenport, Iowa
G	20	Dennis Graff	6 ft 1 in (1.85 m)	170 lb (77 kg)	Fr	Gibson City High School	Gibson City, Illinois
G	21	Larry Cohen	6 ft 2 in (1.88 m)	180 lb (82 kg)	Sr	New Trier East High School	Wilmette, Illinois
G	22	Rich Connell	6 ft 1 in (1.85 m)	175 lb (79 kg)	Fr	St. Joseph-Ogden High School	St. Joseph, Illinois
G	24	Jeff Dawson	6 ft 1 in (1.85 m)	175 lb (79 kg)	Jr	Downers Grove North High School	Oak Park, Illinois
G	25	Donn Deputy	6 ft 4 in (1.93 m)	185 lb (84 kg)	Jr	Pekin High School	Pekin, Illinois
F	30	Mike Wente	6 ft 5 in (1.96 m)	200 lb (91 kg)	Jr	St. Anthony High School	Effingham, Illinois
F	31	Mark Bondeson	6 ft 6 in (1.98 m)	180 lb (82 kg)	Fr	Maine East High School	Des Plaines, Illinois
F	32	Rick Schmidt	6 ft 6 in (1.98 m)	205 lb (93 kg)	So	St. Joseph-Ogden High School	Royal, Illinois
G	33	Otho Tucker	6 ft 6 in (1.98 m)	185 lb (84 kg)	So	Paris High School	Paris, Illinois
F	40	John McBride	6 ft 5 in (1.96 m)	195 lb (88 kg)	Sr	Carl Sandburg High School	Orland Park, Illinois
F/C	41	Dave Smith	6 ft 7 in (2.01 m)	200 lb (91 kg)	Fr	Hinsdale Central High School	Clarendon Hills, Illinois
F	42	Jim Rucks	6 ft 3 in (1.91 m)	215 lb (98 kg)	Sr	Waukegan High School	Waukegan, Illinois
F	44	Jed Foster	6 ft 6 in (1.98 m)	205 lb (93 kg)	Sr	Fairfield High School	Fairfield, Illinois
F/C	45	Nick Conner	6 ft 6 in (1.98 m)	195 lb (88 kg)	Sr	East High School	Columbus, Ohio
C	53	Bill Rucks	7 ft 0 in (2.13 m)	250 lb (113 kg)	Fr	Waukegan High School	Waukegan, Illinois
C	54	Jim DeDecker	6 ft 10 in (2.08 m)	210 lb (95 kg)	Sr	Alleman High School	Moline, Illinois

Head coach

- Harv Schmidt (University of Illinois) (6th year)

Assistant coach(es)

- Dick Campbell (6th year)
- Marshall Stoner (Western Illinois University) (1st year)

Legend

- (C) Team captain
- (S) Suspended
- (I) Ineligible
- (W) Walk-on
- Injured
- Current redshirt

Roster

== Schedule ==
Date time, TV	Rank^{#}	Opponent^{#}	Result	Record	Site (attendance) city, state
Non-Conference regular season
12/2/1972*		DePauw	W 100–68	1 - 0	Assembly Hall (8,755); Champaign, IL
12/4/1972*		Valparaiso	W 80–62	2 - 0	Assembly Hall (8,326); Champaign, IL
12/9/1973*		at Detroit	L 77–79 ^{ot}	2 - 1	Calihan Hall (2,651); Detroit, MI
12/13/1972*		Iowa State	W 74–60	3 - 1	Assembly Hall (8,501); Champaign, IL
12/19/1972*		Furman	W 86–81	4 - 1	Assembly Hall (9,418); Champaign, IL
12/22/1972*		at Southern California	L 72–75	4 - 2	Los Angeles Memorial Sports Arena (3,472); Los Angeles, CA
12/29/1972*		vs. Temple; Sugar Bowl Classic	W 82–77	5 - 2	Municipal Auditorium (6,975); New Orleans, LA
12/30/1972*		vs. No. 1 UCLA; Sugar Bowl Classic	L 64–71	5 - 3	Municipal Auditorium (7,123); New Orleans, LA
Big Ten regular season
1/6/1973		at Purdue	L 80–91	5 - 4 (0 - 1)	Mackey Arena (11,684); West Lafayette, IN
1/8/1973		Wisconsin	W 76–74	6 - 4 (1 - 1)	Assembly Hall (8,607); Champaign, IL
1/13/1973		Iowa; Rivalry	W 80–78	7 - 4 (2 - 1)	Assembly Hall (9,916); Champaign, IL
1/25/1973*		Notre Dame	W 87–84	8 - 4	Chicago Stadium (15,817); Chicago, IL
1/27/1973*		South Carolina	L 76–86	8 - 5	Assembly Hall (6,000); Champaign, IL
2/3/1973		Michigan	W 76–75	9 - 5 (3 - 1)	Assembly Hall (11,117); Champaign, IL
2/5/1973		at Northwestern; Rivalry	W 84–77	10 - 5 (4 - 1)	McGaw Memorial Hall (4,726); Evanston, IL
2/10/1973		at Wisconsin	L 88–99	10 - 6 (4 - 2)	Wisconsin Field House (8,231); Madison, WI
2/12/1973		at No. 4 Indiana; Rivalry	L 67–87	10 - 7 (4 - 3)	Assembly Hall (14,156); Bloomington, IN
2/17/1973		Ohio State	W 79–68	11 - 7 (5 - 3)	Assembly Hall (11,892); Champaign, IL
2/19/1973		No. 4 Minnesota	L 52–72	11 - 8 (5 - 4)	Assembly Hall (11,367); Champaign, IL
2/24/1973		Michigan State	L 82–90	12 - 8 (6 - 4)	Assembly Hall (10,677); Champaign, IL
2/26/1973		at Michigan	W 96–89	13 - 8 (7 - 4)	Crisler Center (8,235); Ann Arbor, MI
3/3/1973		at Ohio State	L 64–65	13 - 9 (7 - 5)	St. John Arena (13,489); Columbus, OH
3/5/1973		Northwestern; Rivalry	W 77–76	14 - 9 (7 - 5)	Assembly Hall (10,857); Champaign, IL
3/10/1973		at Iowa; Rivalry	L 76–93	14 - 10 (8 - 6)	Iowa Field House (12,353); Iowa City, IA
*Non-conference game. ^{#}Rankings from AP Poll. (#) Tournament seedings in parentheses. All times are in Central Time.

== Player stats ==
Player	Games played	Minutes played	Field goals	Free throws	Rebounds	Points
Nick Weatherspoon	24	880	247	106	295	600
Jeff Dawson	24	930	182	83	68	447
Nick Conner	24	845	136	43	221	315
Otho Tucker	24	822	92	53	79	237
Jed Foster	24	487	38	37	99	113
Rick Schmidt	23	471	39	10	90	88
C.J. Schroeder	20	163	9	14	28	32
Dave Roberts	15	8	94	9	7	25
Don Deputy	7	27	4	4	3	12
Bill Rucks	5	31	5	1	10	11
Larry Cohen	3	12	3	0	1	6
Garvin Roberts	8	38	1	2	4	4
Jim Rucks	3	31	1	2	1	4

== Awards and honors ==
- Nick Weatherspoon
  - 1st Team All-American (Helms), Honorable Mention (Converse)
  - Team Most Valuable Player

== Team players drafted into the NBA ==
Player	NBA club	Round	Pick
Nick Weatherspoon	Capitol Bullets	1	13
Jeff Dawson	Golden State Warriors	8	11
Nick Conner	Buffalo Braves	10	2
