= 1972–73 Michigan State Spartans men's basketball team =

American college basketball season

1972–73 Michigan State Spartans men's basketball

Kodak Classic champions Senior Bowl Classic champions
- Conference: Big Ten Conference
- Record: 13–11 (6–8 Big Ten)
- Head coach: Gus Ganakas (4th season)
- Assistant coaches: Robert Nordmann; Matthew Atich
- Captain: Bill Kilgore
- Home arena: Jenison Fieldhouse

1972–73 Big Ten Conference men's basketball standings
	Conf.				Overall
Team	W		L	PCT	W		L	PCT
No. 6 Indiana	11	–	3	.786	22	–	6	.786
No. 10 Minnesota	10	–	4	.714	21	–	5	.808
Purdue	8	–	6	.571	15	–	9	.625
Illinois	8	–	6	.571	14	–	10	.583
Ohio State	8	–	6	.571	14	–	10	.583
Iowa	6	–	8	.429	13	–	11	.542
Michigan	6	–	8	.429	13	–	11	.542
Michigan State	6	–	8	.429	13	–	11	.542
Wisconsin	5	–	9	.357	11	–	13	.458
Northwestern	2	–	12	.143	5	–	19	.208
Rankings from AP Poll

The 1972–73 Michigan State Spartans men's basketball team represented Michigan State University in the 1972–73 NCAA Division I men's basketball season as members of the Big Ten Conference. They played their home games at Jenison Fieldhouse in East Lansing, Michigan and were coached by Gus Ganakas in his fourth year as head coach of the Spartans. They finished the season 13–11, 6–8 in Big Ten play to finish in a tie for sixth place.

== Previous season ==
The Spartans finished the 1971–72 season 13–11, 6–8 in Big Ten play to finish in a tie for fifth place.

== Roster and statistics ==
1972–73 Michigan State Spartans men's basketball team
No	Name	Pos	Year	Height	Pts	Reb
10	Brad VanPelt	F	SR	6–5	1.0	–
11	Gary Ganakas	G	SR	5–5	4.6	2.0
12	William Glover	G	SO	6–2	2.8	0.5
22	Bill Kolgore	C	SR	6–7	16.7	10.0
23	Benny White	G	FR	6–8	1.3	0.3
24	Cedric Milton	C	FR	6–8	1.8	1.7
25	Terry Furlow	F	FR	6–3	5.7	3.5
31	Mike Robinson	G	JR	5–11	25.3	4.2
32	Peter Davis	G	SO	6–1	3.3	1.0
34	Joe Schakleton	F	SO	6–2	1.1	0.8
41	Thomas Mcgill	F	SO	6–4	1.0	–
44	Allen Smith	F	SO	6–5	11.7	0.6
45	Lindsay Hairston	C	SO	6–7	11.5	7.9
–	Steve Borenstein	G	SO	5–10	2.0	–
–	Terry Fagan	G	JR	5–9	–	–
–	Dave Jackson	F	FR	6–3	–	–
–	Jim Shereda	C	SR	6–8	–	–

== Schedule and results ==
Date time, TV	Rank^{#}	Opponent^{#}	Result	Record	Site city, state
Regular season
Nov. 28, 1972*		Toledo	W 98–96	1–0	Jenison Fieldhouse; East Lansing, MI
Dec 2, 1972*		No. 13 Kentucky	L 66–75	1–1	Jenison Fieldhouse; East Lansing, MI
Dec 9, 1972*		at South Carolina	L 64–83	1–2	Carolina Coliseum; Columbia, SC
Dec 16, 1972*		at Western Michigan	W 76–73	2–2	University Arena; Kalamazoo, MI
Dec 19, 1972*		Central Michigan	W 96–74	3–2	Jenison Fieldhouse; East Lansing, MI
Dec 29, 1972*		at Rochester; Kodak Classic semifinals	W 103–61	4–2	Community War Memorial; Rochester, NY
Dec 30, 1972*		vs. Arizona State; Kodak Classic final	W 83–74	5–2	Community War Memorial; Rochester, NY
Jan 2, 1973*		vs. Mississippi State; Senior Bowl Classic semifinals	W 90–82	6–2	Jaguar Gym; Mobile, AL
Jan 3, 1973*		at South Alabama; Senior Bowl Classic final	W 86–78	7–2	Jaguar Gym; Mobile, AL
Jan 6, 1973		Northwestern	W 90–77	8–2 (1–0)	Jenison Fieldhouse; East Lansing, MI
Jan 13, 1973		Michigan; Rivalry	L 71–78	8–3 (1–1)	Jenison Fieldhouse; East Lansing, MI
Jan 15, 1973		at Iowa	W 76–74	9–3 (2–1)	Iowa Field House; Iowa City, IA
Jan 20, 1973		at Wisconsin	L 80–93	9–4 (2–2)	Wisconsin Field House; Madison, WI
Jan 22, 1973		No. 16 Indiana	L 89–97	9–5 (2–3)	Jenison Fieldhouse; East Lansing, MI
Jan 27, 1973		at No. 8 Minnesota	L 77–93	9–6 (2–4)	Williams Arena; Minneapolis, MN
Feb 3, 1973		Iowa	W 94–89	10–6 (3–4)	Jenison Fieldhouse; East Lansing, MI
Feb 7, 1973*		at Notre Dame	L 72–85	10–7	Purcell Pavilion at the Joyce Center; South Bend, IN
Feb 10, 1973		at Michigan; Rivalry	L 81–97	10–8 (3–5)	Crisler Arena; Ann Arbor, MI
Feb 17, 1973		Purdue	L 84–88	10–9 (3–6)	Jenison Fieldhouse; East Lansing, MI
Feb 19, 1973		at No. 11 Indiana	L 65–75	10–10 (3–7)	Assembly Hall; Bloomington, IN
Feb 24, 1973		at Illinois	L 71–81	10–11 (3–8)	Assembly Hall; Champaign, IL
Feb 26, 1973		Ohio State	W 87–83	11–11 (4–8)	Jenison Fieldhouse; East Lansing, MI
Mar 3, 1973		at Northwestern	W 86–72	12–11 (5–8)	Welsh-Ryan Arena; Evanston, IL
Mar 10, 1973		Wisconsin	W 79–78 ^{OT}	13–11 (6–8)	Jenison Fieldhouse; East Lansing, MI
*Non-conference game. ^{#}Rankings from AP Poll. (#) Tournament seedings in parentheses. Source

== Awards and honors ==
- Mike Robinson – All-Big Ten First Team
