= 1972–73 Iowa State Cyclones men's basketball team =

American college basketball season

1972–73 Iowa State Cyclones men's basketball
- Conference: Big Eight Conference
- Record: 16–10 (7–7 Big Eight)
- Head coach: Maury John (2nd season)
- Home arena: Hilton Coliseum

The 1972–73 Iowa State Cyclones men's basketball team represented Iowa State University during the 1972–73 NCAA Division I men's basketball season. The Cyclones were coached by Maury John, who was in his second season with the Cyclones. They played their home games at Hilton Coliseum in Ames, Iowa.

They finished the season 16–10, 7–7 in Big Eight play to finish in fifth place.

1972–73 Big Eight Conference men's basketball standings
	Conf.				Overall
Team	W		L	PCT	W		L	PCT
No. 9 Kansas State	12	–	2	.857	23	–	5	.821
No. 15 Missouri	9	–	5	.643	21	–	6	.778
Colorado	9	–	5	.643	13	–	13	.500
Oklahoma	8	–	6	.571	18	–	8	.692
Iowa State	7	–	7	.500	16	–	10	.615
Nebraska	7	–	7	.500	9	–	17	.346
Kansas	4	–	10	.286	8	–	18	.308
Oklahoma State	3	–	11	.214	7	–	19	.269
Rankings from AP Poll

== Roster ==
1972–73 Iowa State Cyclones men's basketball team
Players
Coaches

Pos.	#	Name	Height	Weight	Year	Hometown
	45	Gregg Barcus	6 ft 7 in (2.01 m)	—	Sr
F	33	Mike Benjamin	6 ft 6 in (1.98 m)	—	Fr	LaPorte, Indiana
G	12	Bill Benson	6 ft 2 in (1.88 m)	—
G	24	Mike Capobianco	—	—	Jr
C	44	Craig DeLoss	6 ft 10 in (2.08 m)	—		Spencer, Iowa
G	31	Martinez Denmon	6 ft 2 in (1.88 m)	—
F	43	Clint Harris	6 ft 7 in (2.01 m)	—
F	32	Wes Harris	6 ft 8 in (2.03 m)	—
G	14	Eric Heft	6 ft 1 in (1.85 m)	—	Jr
G	54	Hercle Ivy	6 ft 3 in (1.91 m)	—	Fr	St. Louis, Missouri
	42	John John	—	—		Des Moines, Iowa
C	52	Larry Loots	6 ft 9 in (2.06 m)	—		Ames, Iowa
C	40	Tom O'Connor	7 ft 0 in (2.13 m)	—
F	50	Jim Reinebach	—	—	Sr
	10	Robbie Robinson	—	—	Sr
F	33	Clyde Winters	6 ft 5 in (1.96 m)	—

Head coach

- Maury John

Assistant coach(es)

Legend

- (C) Team captain
- (S) Suspended
- (I) Ineligible
- (W) Walk-on
- Injured
- Current redshirt

== Schedule and results ==
Date time, TV	Rank^{#}	Opponent^{#}	Result	Record	Site city, state
Regular season
December 2, 1972*; 7:30 pm		Chicago State	W 77–46	1–0	Hilton Coliseum (10,000); Ames, Iowa
December 5, 1972*; 7:35 pm		UC-Davis	W 86–60	2–0	Hilton Coliseum (8,300); Ames, Iowa
December 9, 1972*; 7:30 pm		Southern Colorado	W 88–71	3–0	Hilton Coliseum (10,000); Ames, Iowa
December 13, 1972*; 8:00 pm		at Illinois	L 60–74	3–1	Assembly Hall (8,501); Champaign, Illinois
December 16, 1972*; 7:35 pm, WOI		Drake; Iowa Big Four	W 88–84	4–1	Hilton Coliseum (14,255); Ames, Iowa
December 19, 1972*; 7:35 pm		North Dakota State	W 96–67	5–1	Hilton Coliseum (8,000); Ames, Iowa
December 22, 1972*; 7:35 pm		UC-Santa Barbara	W 89–79	6–1	Hilton Coliseum (8,000); Ames, Iowa
December 27, 1972*; 7:00 pm		vs. Nebraska; Big Eight Holiday Tournament Quarterfinals	W 75–64	7–1	Municipal Auditorium (8,106); Kansas City, Missouri
December 29, 1972*; 9:00 pm		vs. No. 16 Kansas State; Big Eight Holiday Tournament Semifinals	L 65–68	7–2	Municipal Auditorium (10,153); Kansas City, Missouri
December 30, 1972*; 3:00 pm		vs. No. 19 Oklahoma; Big Eight Holiday Tournament Third Place	W 87–84	8–2	Municipal Auditorium (3,593); Kansas City, Missouri
January 2, 1973*; 7:30 pm		at Iowa; CyHawk Rivalry	L 57–66	8–3	Iowa Fieldhouse (13,211); Iowa City, Iowa
January 6, 1973*; 7:30 pm, WOI (delay)		UW-Oshkosh	W 92–67	9–3	Hilton Coliseum (13,000); Ames, Iowa
January 8, 1973; 7:35 pm, WOI (delay)		Oklahoma State	W 73–59	10–3 (1–0)	Hilton Coliseum (10,000); Ames, Iowa
January 13, 1973; 2:00 pm, Big Eight		Oklahoma	W 94–91	11–3 (2–0)	Hilton Coliseum (10,000); Ames, Iowa
January 20, 1973; 7:30 pm		at Oklahoma State	W 86–74	12–3 (3–0)	Gallagher Hall (3,500); Stillwater, Oklahoma
January 22, 1973; 7:30 pm		at Oklahoma	L 84–86	12–4 (3–1)	Oklahoma Field House (5,000); Norman, Oklahoma
January 27, 1973; 7:35 pm, WOI (delay)		Kansas	L 78–90	12–5 (3–2)	Hilton Coliseum (12,500); Ames, Iowa
January 30, 1973; 7:35 pm, WOI (delay)		Nebraska	W 81–60	13–5 (4–2)	Hilton Coliseum (10,000); Ames, Iowa
February 3, 1973; 2:00 pm, Big Eight		Colorado	L 81–83	13–6 (4–3)	Hilton Coliseum (12,300); Ames, Iowa
February 6, 1973; 7:35 pm		at No. 18 Kansas State	L 74–78	13–7 (4–4)	Ahearn Fieldhouse (12,500); Manhattan, Kansas
February 10, 1973; 7:30 pm		at No. 8 Missouri	L 79–86	13–8 (4–5)	Hearnes Center (12,400); Columbia, Missouri
February 17, 1973; 7:35 pm, WOI (delay)		No. 15 Kansas State	L 76–89	13–9 (4–6)	Hilton Coliseum (13,000); Ames, Iowa
February 27, 1973; 7:35 pm		at Nebraska	W 82–76	14–9 (5–6)	Nebraska Coliseum (5,730); Lincoln, Nebraska
March 3, 1973; 7:30 pm		at Colorado	L 74–79	14–10 (5–7)	Balch Fieldhouse (2,148); Boulder, Colorado
March 5, 1973; 7:35 pm, WOI (delay)		No. 13 Missouri	W 90–80	15–10 (6–7)	Hilton Coliseum (13,000); Ames, Iowa
March 10, 1973; 1:10 pm, Big Eight		at Kansas	W 89–65	16–10 (7–7)	Allen Fieldhouse (7,500); Lawrence, Kansas
*Non-conference game. ^{#}Rankings from AP poll. (#) Tournament seedings in parentheses. All times are in Central Time.
