= 1972–73 Wisconsin Badgers men's basketball team =

American college basketball season

1972–73 Wisconsin Badgers men's basketball
- Conference: Big Ten Conference
- Record: 11–13 (5–9 Big Ten)
- Head coach: John Powless
- Home arena: UW Fieldhouse

1972–73 Big Ten Conference men's basketball standings
	Conf.				Overall
Team	W		L	PCT	W		L	PCT
No. 6 Indiana	11	–	3	.786	22	–	6	.786
No. 10 Minnesota	10	–	4	.714	21	–	5	.808
Purdue	8	–	6	.571	15	–	9	.625
Illinois	8	–	6	.571	14	–	10	.583
Ohio State	8	–	6	.571	14	–	10	.583
Iowa	6	–	8	.429	13	–	11	.542
Michigan	6	–	8	.429	13	–	11	.542
Michigan State	6	–	8	.429	13	–	11	.542
Wisconsin	5	–	9	.357	11	–	13	.458
Northwestern	2	–	12	.143	5	–	19	.208
Rankings from AP Poll

The 1972–73 Wisconsin Badgers men's basketball team represented University of Wisconsin–Madison. The head coach was John Powless, coaching his fifth season with the Badgers. The team played their home games at the UW Fieldhouse in Madison, Wisconsin and was a member of the Big Ten Conference.

== Schedule ==
Date time, TV	Rank^{#}	Opponent^{#}	Result	Record	Site city, state
Regular Season
11/25/1972*		at No. 1 UCLA	L 53–94	0–1	Pauley Pavilion; Los Angeles, CA
12/02/1972*		SIU-Edwardsville	W 100–74	1–1	UW Fieldhouse; Madison, WI
12/04/1972*		at No. 12 Oral Roberts	L 76–90	1–2	Mabee Center; Tulsa, OK
12/09/1972*		South Dakota	W 87–63	2–2	UW Fieldhouse; Madison, WI
12/19/1972*		West Virginia	W 77–59	3–2	UW Fieldhouse; Madison, WI
12/29/1972*		vs. Yale; Milwaukee Classic	W 90–64	4–2	Milwaukee Arena; Milwaukee, WI
12/30/1972*		vs. No. 3 Marquette; Milwaukee Classic	L 73–75 ^{2OT}	4–3	Milwaukee Arena; Milwaukee, WI
1/03/1973*		at Pittsburgh	W 72–70	5–3	Fitzgerald Field House; Pittsburgh, PA
1/06/1973		No. 20 Indiana	L 64–78	5–4 (0–1)	UW Fieldhouse; Madison, WI
1/08/1973		at Illinois	L 74–76	5–5 (0–2)	Assembly Hall; Champaign, IL
1/13/1973		at No. 8 Minnesota	L 54–78	5–6 (0–3)	Williams Arena; Minneapolis, MN
1/20/1973		Michigan State	W 93–80	6–6 (1–3)	UW Fieldhouse; Madison, WI
1/22/1973		at No. 20 Purdue	L 59–66	6–7 (1–4)	Mackey Arena; West Lafayette, IN
1/27/1973		at Northwestern	L 73–74	6–8 (1–5)	Welsh-Ryan Arena; Evanston, IL
1/29/1973		No. 9 Minnesota	L 64–81	6–9 (1–6)	UW Fieldhouse; Madison, WI
2/03/1973		Ohio State	W 84–76	7–9 (2–6)	UW Fieldhouse; Madison, WI
2/06/1973*		No. 7 Marquette	L 58–64	7–10	UW Fieldhouse; Madison, WI
2/10/1973		Illinois	W 99–88	8–10 (3–6)	UW Fieldhouse; Madison, WI
2/17/1973		at Iowa	L 76–100	8–11 (3–7)	Iowa Field House; Iowa City, IA
2/20/1973*		at Ohio	W 82–68	9–11	Convocation Center; Athens, OH
2/24/1973		at No. 10 Indiana	L 55–57	9–12 (3–8)	Assembly Hall; Bloomington, IN
2/26/1973		No. 20 Purdue	W 71–63	10–12 (4–8)	UW Fieldhouse; Madison, WI
3/03/1973		Michigan	W 94–79	11–12 (5–8)	UW Fieldhouse; Madison, WI
3/10/1973		at Michigan State	L 78–79 ^{OT}	11–13 (5–9)	Jenison Fieldhouse; East Lansing, MI
*Non-conference game. ^{#}Rankings from AP Poll. (#) Tournament seedings in parentheses.
