= 1972–73 Michigan Wolverines men's basketball team =

American college basketball season

1972–73 Michigan Wolverines men's basketball
- Conference: Big Ten Conference
- Record: 13–11 (6–8 Big Ten)
- Head coach: Johnny Orr
- Assistant coaches: Jim Dutcher; Dick Honig; Richard Carter (freshmen)
- MVP: Dion Harris

1972–73 Big Ten Conference men's basketball standings
	Conf.				Overall
Team	W		L	PCT	W		L	PCT
No. 6 Indiana	11	–	3	.786	22	–	6	.786
No. 10 Minnesota	10	–	4	.714	21	–	5	.808
Purdue	8	–	6	.571	15	–	9	.625
Illinois	8	–	6	.571	14	–	10	.583
Ohio State	8	–	6	.571	14	–	10	.583
Iowa	6	–	8	.429	13	–	11	.542
Michigan	6	–	8	.429	13	–	11	.542
Michigan State	6	–	8	.429	13	–	11	.542
Wisconsin	5	–	9	.357	11	–	13	.458
Northwestern	2	–	12	.143	5	–	19	.208
Rankings from AP Poll

The 1972–73 Michigan Wolverines men's basketball team represented the University of Michigan in intercollegiate college basketball during the 1972–73 season. The team played its home games in the Crisler Arena in Ann Arbor, Michigan, and was a member of the Big Ten Conference. Under the direction of head coach Johnny Orr, the team finished tied for sixth in the Big Ten Conference. The team failed to earn an invitation to either the 1978 National Invitation Tournament or the 1978 NCAA Men's Division I Basketball Tournament. The team was ranked in the Associated Press Top Twenty-Five Poll for three of the season's fifteen weeks, reaching a number 18 ranking on December 5, 1977, and falling out after the December 12, 1977, poll.

== Roster ==
1972–73 Michigan Wolverines men's basketball team
Players	Coaches
Pos. / # / Name / Height / Weight / Year / Hometown; C / 41 / C. J. Kupec / 6 ft 8 in (2.03 m) / 230 lb (104 kg) / So / Oak Lawn, Illinois	Head coach: Johnny Orr; Assistant coach(es) Legend: (C) Team captain; (S) Suspended; (I) Ineligible; (W) Walk-on; Injured; Current redshirt

== Rankings ==
Ranking movements Legend: ██ Increase in ranking ██ Decrease in ranking
	Week															
Poll	Pre	1	2	3	4	5	6	7	8	9	10	11	12	13	14	Final
AP Poll	19	18	18													

== Team players drafted into the NBA ==
Six players from this team were selected in the NBA draft.

Year	Round	Pick	Overall	Player	NBA Club
1973	4	9	61	Ken Brady	Detroit Pistons
1973	5	9	78	Henry Wilmore	Detroit Pistons
1973	14	1	189	Ernie Johnson	Philadelphia 76ers
1974	1	8	8	Campy Russell	Cleveland Cavaliers
1975	4	2	56	C. J. Kupec	Los Angeles Lakers
1976	4	9	60	Wayman Britt	Los Angeles Lakers
