= Ray Tolbert =

American basketball player and coach (born 1958)

Personal information
- Born: September 10, 1958 (age 68) Anderson, Indiana, U.S.
- Listed height: 6 ft 9 in (2.06 m)
- Listed weight: 225 lb (102 kg)

Career information
- High school: Madison Heights (Anderson, Indiana)
- College: Indiana (1977–1981)
- NBA draft: 1981: 1st round, 18th overall pick
- Drafted by: New Jersey Nets
- Playing career: 1981–1994
- Position: Power forward
- Number: 30, 33, 24, 18, 34, 44

Career history

Playing
- 1981: New Jersey Nets
- 1981–1983: Seattle SuperSonics
- 1983–1984: Detroit Pistons
- 1984–1985: Reyer Venezia Mestre
- 1985: Tampa Bay Thrillers
- 1985–1986: Bay State Bombardiers
- 1986–1987: La Crosse Catbirds
- 1987: Pensacola Tornados
- 1987: New York Knicks
- 1987–1988: Los Angeles Lakers
- 1988–1989: Atlanta Hawks
- 1989–1990: Aurora Desio
- 1991: Málaga
- 1993–1994: Fort Wayne Fury

Coaching
- 2006–2007: Anderson Champions

Career highlights
- CBA All-Defensive Second Team (1986); NCAA champion (1981); Fourth-team Parade All-American (1977); McDonald's All-American (1977); Indiana Mr. Basketball (1977)
- Stats at NBA.com
- Stats at Basketball Reference
Medals
Representing United States
Men's basketball
Pan American Games
Gold medal – first place	1979 San Juan	Team competition

Ray Lee Tolbert (born September 10, 1958) is an American former professional basketball player who was selected by the New Jersey Nets in the first round (18th pick overall) of the 1981 NBA draft. A 6 ft 9 in (2.06 m) power forward from Indiana University, Tolbert played in five NBA seasons for six different teams. He played for the Nets, Seattle SuperSonics, Detroit Pistons, New York Knicks, Los Angeles Lakers and Atlanta Hawks.

Tolbert attended Madison Heights High School in Anderson, Indiana. He was named to the inaugural McDonald's All-American team, which played in the 1977 Capital Classic. During the senior year of his collegiate career in 1981, starters Tolbert, Landon Turner, Isiah Thomas, Randy Wittman, and Ted Kitchel led Indiana to its fourth NCAA championship and Coach Bob Knight's second.

In his NBA career, he played in 261 games and scored a total of 928 points.

Tolbert played in the Continental Basketball Association (CBA) for the Tampa Bay Thrillers, Bay State Bombardiers, La Crosse Catbirds, Pensacola Tornados and Fort Wayne Fury from 1985 to 1987 and during the 1993–94 season. He was selected to the CBA All-Defensive Second Team in 1986.

He later became the coach of the ABA's Anderson Champions.

He currently resides in Fishers, Indiana where he is the Varsity Assistant at Fishers High School.

== Career statistics ==
Legend
GP	Games played	GS	Games started	MPG	Minutes per game
FG%	Field goal percentage	3P%	3-point field goal percentage	FT%	Free throw percentage
RPG	Rebounds per game	APG	Assists per game	SPG	Steals per game
BPG	Blocks per game	PPG	Points per game	**Bold**	Career high

=== NBA ===
==== Regular season ====
Year	Team	GP	GS	MPG	FG%	3P%	FT%	RPG	APG	SPG	BPG	PPG
1981–82	New Jersey	12	0	9.6	.455	.000	.500	2.3	**.7**	.3	.2	3.7
1981–82	Seattle	52	0	9.5	.506	.000	.556	1.9	.5	.2	.3	3.4
1982–83	Seattle	45	**2**	15.8	.526	.000	.545	**3.4**	**.7**	.4	.5	5.0
1982–83	Detroit	28	0	14.1	.460	.000	.475	3.3	**.7**	.4	**.8**	**5.1**
1983–84	Detroit	49	0	9.7	.529	.000	.511	2.0	.5	.2	.4	3.1
1987–88	New York	11	0	**16.1**	.463	–	.529	3.2	.5	**.5**	.2	4.3
1987–88	L.A. Lakers	14	0	5.9	**.571**	–	**.769**	1.4	.4	.2	.2	3.0
1988–89	Atlanta	**50**	0	6.8	.426	–	.622	1.8	.3	.3	.3	2.1
Career		261	2	10.7	.495	.000	.544	2.3	.5	.3	.4	3.6

==== Playoffs ====
Year	Team	GP	MPG	FG%	3P%	FT%	RPG	APG	SPG	BPG	PPG
1982	Seattle	**4**	**7.8**	**.600**	–	**.500**	**1.3**	**.3**	**1.0**	.0	**2.5**
1984	Detroit	1	2.0	–	–	–	.0	.0	.0	.0	.0
Career		5	6.6	.600	–	.500	1.0	.2	.8	.0	2.0
