= Landon Turner (basketball) =

American basketball player (born 1960)

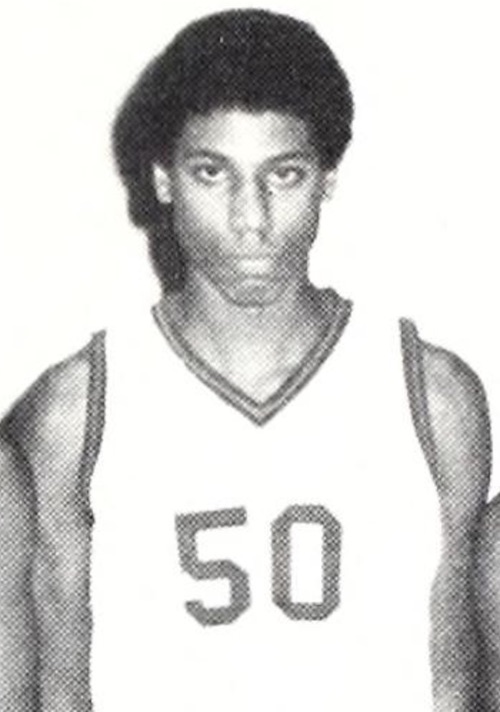
- Turner with the Arsenal Tech basketball team in 1977

Personal information
- Born: September 30, 1960 (age 66) Indianapolis, Indiana, U.S.
- Listed height: 6 ft 10 in (2.08 m)
- Listed weight: 235 lb (107 kg)

Career information
- High school: Arsenal Tech (Indianapolis, Indiana)
- College: Indiana (1978–1982)
- NBA draft: 1982: 10th round, 225th overall pick
- Drafted by: Boston Celtics
- Position: Power forward / center

Career highlights
- NCAA champion (1981); USBWA Most Courageous Award (1989); McDonald's All-American (1978); First-team Parade All-American (1978)
- Stats at Basketball Reference

Landon Montel Turner (born September 30, 1960) is an American former basketball player. He played college basketball for the Indiana Hoosiers and won an NCAA championship as a junior in 1981. Hoosiers head coach Bob Knight considered Turner to have the potential to be the best player he ever coached. Primed for a breakthrough senior season and considered to become a top pick in the National Basketball Association (NBA) draft, Turner's basketball career came to an end when he was paralyzed from the chest down in a car accident in July 1981. He stayed with the Hoosiers as a team captain during the 1981–82 season before the Boston Celtics honored Turner by selecting him as the final pick of the 1982 NBA draft. He played wheelchair basketball for three years before he embarked on a career as a motivational speaker. Turner is a member of the Indiana Basketball Hall of Fame and the Indiana University Athletics Hall of Fame.

== Early life ==
Turner was born on September 30, 1960, to Adell and Rita Turner. His father competed in track and played football; he received an athletic scholarship to play football for the Purdue Boilermakers but dropped out. Adell later worked as a security officer for the Ford Motor Company. Turner considers his father to be his biggest influence as an athlete.

Turner played basketball at Arsenal Technical High School – the same school as his father. He grew from 6 ft 5 in (1.96 m) during his freshman year to 6 ft 9 in (2.06 m) in his sophomore year, when he also developed the ability to slam dunk. During his senior season, Turner emerged as a star prospect and set an Arsenal Tech season record for points with 616 while he averaged 21.4 points and 15.8 rebounds per game. Turner was named a Parade All-American and played in the 1978 McDonald's All-American Game as the only player from Indiana.

== College career ==
Turner received 300 letters of college offers, but narrowed his choices down to the Indiana Hoosiers and the Purdue Boilermakers in his home state so his parents could attend his games. His father was a fan of the Hoosiers and their head coach Bob Knight, and Turner committed to play for the Hoosiers under Knight in the fall of 1978. Having heard about Knight's relentlessness as a coach, Turner was surprised by his "calm demeanor" during a home visit and jokingly considered Knight to be "a demon in disguise". Once Turner joined the Hoosiers, Knight was so hard on him that he considered quitting the team during his freshman season. Hoosiers teammate Steve Risley believed Knight saw more potential in Landon than anyone else but saw him making less of an effort. Knight thought Turner could be the best player he coached and the greatest Hoosiers player ever but became increasingly frustrated by his lack of growth. At the conclusion of his sophomore season, Knight was so annoyed by Turner's casual attitude that he told him to quit the team and play professionally. Turner persisted with the Hoosiers but his grades dropped as he attended parties instead of studying, which led to his benching by Knight during his junior season. Knight believed that Turner "couldn't think past tomorrow" and grew increasingly frustrated by his lack of willingness to apply himself completely in practices. After Turner restored his grades and Knight saw improvement in his playing, he was returned to the starting line-up with a few games left in the Big Ten Conference, where he helped the team remain undefeated for the rest of the season. During the 1981 NCAA Division I Basketball Tournament, Turner formed a formidable trio with guard Isiah Thomas and center Ray Tolbert who were considered to be the Hoosiers' best players. In the final game of the tournament, the Hoosiers defeated the North Carolina Tar Heels 63–50 to win the NCAA championship. Turner was named to the all-tournament team.

With the graduation of Tolbert and the draft declaration of Thomas, Turner was expected to be the cornerstone of the Hoosiers during the 1981–82 season. Knight believed Turner could have been the best player in the country during his senior season while Boston Celtics general manager Red Auerbach had expected him to be a top-five selection in the 1982 NBA draft. Thomas compared Turner to James Worthy and thought "he had all the makings of being a great power forward."

=== Paralysis ===
On the morning of July 25, 1981, Turner was driving on Indiana State Road 46 near Columbus, Indiana, when he lost control of his car on a curve in the road and flipped it. He was driving to the Kings Island amusement park in Ohio with three friends, who were all also injured in the crash. Turner had not been wearing a seat belt when he crashed. Turner was taken to Bartholomew County Hospital in Columbus before he was transferred to Indiana University Health Methodist Hospital later that same day. Knight, who was on a summer fishing vacation in Idaho, flew back to Indiana to be with Turner and his family. He was also visited in hospital by Thomas, who remarked to teammate Randy Wittman: "If I knew this was going to happen, I wouldn't have left". Turner fractured his spine and felt "some paralysis in his hands and legs" after the accident. With the injury low in his back, Turner eventually had the full use of his arms and hands return but his legs were permanently paralyzed. His medical costs in hospital were covered by his father's healthcare insurance policy through his employer, Ford Motor Company.

Turner's incident earned national attention and he received an outpouring of mail during his hospital stay; Richard Pryor, B. J. Thomas, Dick Enberg and Darryl Stingley were among those who wrote to him. Knight organized a campaign to establish the Landon Turner Trust Fund that helped raise $400,000 to pay for Turner's medical bills. Knight, Indiana University president John W. Ryan, former U.S. senator Birch Bayh and former Governor of Indiana Otis Bowen volunteered as advisors for the fund. Thomas staged an all-star basketball game in 1981 that helped raise an additional $90,000. Turner stayed in hospital for four months before he returned to his parents' house. During his recovery time, Turner and Knight developed a close relationship that was considered to be like that of a father and son. Knight named Turner as team captain of the Hoosiers for the 1981–82 season.

The Boston Celtics honoured Turner by selecting him as the 225th and final selection of the 1982 NBA draft at the suggestion of Knight, who had mentioned it in a conversation with Celtics general manager Red Auerbach and head coach Bill Fitch at an NBA instructional camp a month prior. Auerbach stated after making the selection: "We would have been honored to have him be part of the Boston Celtics and felt this is one way to show how we felt about him." Knight considered the gesture "a beautiful thing" by the Celtics and subsequently called Auerbach "one of the class people in sports." After finding out he had been drafted, Turner jocularly sent a telegram to Auerbach that read: "When do I report for tryout?" Auerbach stayed in contact with Turner and sent him two championship watches when the Celtics won the NBA Finals in 1984 and 1986.

== Life after basketball ==
Turner sued the Ford Motor Company in 1983 and claimed that the roof of his 1973 Ford LTD offered him no protection during his accident. He requested compensation for his medical expenses and lost earnings from a professional career. Turner signed an out-of-court settlement with Ford for an undisclosed amount in 1985.

Upon the insistence of Knight, Turner returned to Indiana University Bloomington (IU) to complete his physical education degree in 1983. He had to attend some classes at Indiana University – Purdue University Indianapolis (IUPUI) due to his inability to mount the stairs for his classrooms at IU. Turner graduated in 1984. That same year, he was employed by IU as coordinator of minority affairs and held that position until 1988.

Turner began playing wheelchair basketball for the Circle City Knight Riders, who were affiliated with the Indiana Pacers, in 1987. He was initially reluctant to play wheelchair basketball because he could not play like he used to but joined at the insistence of the Knight Riders' founder Tony Williams. Turner was selected for the Most Courageous Award by the United States Basketball Writers Association in 1989 for his basketball comeback. He played wheelchair basketball for three years but quit because he did not have the same love for the game.

Turner founded a motivational speaking business, Landon Turner Enterprises Inc., in 1989. He speaks at schools and churches about disability awareness, the story of his life and gaining acceptance. Turner wrote a book titled Landon Turner's Tales from the 1980–81 Indiana Hoosiers about his season-long struggles with the championship-winning team that also features a foreword by Knight.

Turner was inducted into the Indiana Basketball Hall of Fame in 2007 and the Indiana University Athletics Hall of Fame in 2012.

== Career statistics ==
Legend
GP	Games played	GS	Games started	MPG	Minutes per game
FG%	Field goal percentage	3P%	3-point field goal percentage	FT%	Free throw percentage
RPG	Rebounds per game	APG	Assists per game	SPG	Steals per game
BPG	Blocks per game	PPG	Points per game	**Bold**	Career high

=== College ===
Year	Team	GP	GS	MPG	FG%	3P%	FT%	RPG	APG	SPG	BPG	PPG
1978–79	Indiana	**33**	13	18.0	.542	–	.538	3.4	.3	**.5**	.3	5.5
1979–80	Indiana	26	12	20.0	.485	–	.708	**4.4**	.5	**.5**	.4	7.4
1980–81	Indiana	**33**	**18**	**21.0**	**.561**	–	**.717**	3.7	**.8**	**.5**	**.5**	**9.5**
Career		92	43	19.6	.534	–	.654	3.8	.5	.5	.4	7.5
