= 1972–73 Indiana Hoosiers men's basketball team =

American college basketball season

1972–73 Indiana Hoosiers men's basketball

Big Ten Champions

NCAA Men's Division I Tournament, Final Four
- Conference: Big Ten Conference

Ranking
- Coaches: No. 6
- AP: No. 6
- Record: 22–6 (11–3 Big Ten)
- Head coach: Bobby Knight (2nd season)
- Assistant coaches: Dave Bliss; John Hulls; Bob Weltlich
- Captain: John Ritter
- Home arena: Assembly Hall

1972–73 Big Ten Conference men's basketball standings
	Conf.				Overall
Team	W		L	PCT	W		L	PCT
No. 6 Indiana	11	–	3	.786	22	–	6	.786
No. 10 Minnesota	10	–	4	.714	21	–	5	.808
Purdue	8	–	6	.571	15	–	9	.625
Illinois	8	–	6	.571	14	–	10	.583
Ohio State	8	–	6	.571	14	–	10	.583
Iowa	6	–	8	.429	13	–	11	.542
Michigan	6	–	8	.429	13	–	11	.542
Michigan State	6	–	8	.429	13	–	11	.542
Wisconsin	5	–	9	.357	11	–	13	.458
Northwestern	2	–	12	.143	5	–	19	.208
Rankings from AP Poll

The 1972–73 Indiana Hoosiers men's basketball team represented Indiana University. Their head coach was Bobby Knight, who was in his second year. The team played its home games in Assembly Hall in Bloomington, Indiana, and was a member of the Big Ten Conference.

The Hoosiers finished the regular season with an overall record of 22–6 and a conference record of 11–3, finishing 1st in the Big Ten Conference. After a quick first-round exit during the 1972 NIT, Indiana was invited to participate in the 1973 NCAA Tournament, where Bobby Knight and the Hoosiers advanced to the Final Four. IU lost to the UCLA Bruins, who went on to win their 7th straight national title; however, IU secured third place after beating Providence.

== Roster ==
No.	Name	Position	Ht.	Year	Hometown
20	Frank Wilson	G	6–3	Sr.	Bluffton, Indiana
21	Quinn Buckner	G	6–3	Fr.	Phoenix, Illinois
22	Trent Smock	F	6–5	Fr.	Richmond, Indiana
22	Bootsie White	G	5–8	Sr.	Hammond, Indiana
23	Steve Heiniger	G	5–10	Jr.	Fort Wayne, Indiana
24	Steve Ahlfeld	G	6–1	So.	Wabash, Indiana
25	Doug Allen	F	6–6	So.	Champaign, Illinois
30	John Kamstra	G	6–1	So.	Frankfort, Indiana
31	John Laskowski	G/F	6–5	So.	South Bend, Indiana
32	Steve Downing	C	6–8	Sr.	Indianapolis, Indiana
33	Jerry Memering	F/C	6–7	Sr.	Vincennes, Indiana
34	Steve Green	F	6–7	So.	Sellersburg, Indiana
35	Don Noort	C	6–8	Fr.	Worth, Illinois
40	Mike Miller	F	6–8	Fr.	Bloomington, Indiana
41	Craig Morris	G	6–4	Fr.	DeGraff, Ohio
42	John Ritter	F	6–5	Sr.	Goshen, Indiana
43	John Hunter	F	6–6	So.	Danville, Indiana
45	Jim Crews	G	6–5	Fr.	Normal, Illinois
55	Tom Abernethy	F	6–7	Fr.	South Bend, Indiana

== Schedule/results ==
Date time, TV	Rank^{#}	Opponent^{#}	Result	Record	Site city, state
Regular season
12/2/1972*		Harvard	W 97–76	1–0	Assembly Hall; Bloomington, IN
12/5/1972*		at Kansas	W 72–55	2–0	Allen Field House; Lawrence, KS
12/9/1972*		No. 8 Kentucky; Indiana–Kentucky rivalry	W 64–58	3–0	Assembly Hall; Bloomington, IN
12/12/1972*	No. 15	Notre Dame	W 69–67	4–0	Assembly Hall; Bloomington, IN
12/16/1972*	No. 15	Ohio	W 89–68	5–0	Assembly Hall; Bloomington, IN
12/22/1972*	No. 9	at South Carolina	L 85–88	5–1	Carolina Coliseum; Columbia, SC
12/28/1972*	No. 15	vs. No. 13 Houston	W 75–72	6–1	Memorial Gymnasium; El Paso, TX
12/29/1972*	No. 15	at UTEP	L 65–74	6–2	Memorial Gymnasium; El Paso, Texas
1/3/1973*	No. 20	Ball State	W 94–71	7–2	Assembly Hall; Bloomington, IN
1/6/1973	No. 20	at Wisconsin	W 78–64	8–2 (1–0)	Wisconsin Field House; Madison, WI
1/9/1973*	No. 16	Miami (OH)	W 80–68	9–2 (1–0)	Assembly Hall; Bloomington, IN
1/13/1973	No. 16	Ohio State	W 81–67	10–2 (2–0)	Assembly Hall; Bloomington, IN
1/20/1973	No. 16	No. 6 Minnesota	W 83–71	11–2 (3–0)	Assembly Hall; Bloomington, IN
1/22/1973	No. 16	at Michigan State	W 97–89	12–2 (4–0)	Jenison Fieldhouse; East Lansing, MI
1/27/1973	No. 6	at Michigan	W 79–73	13–2 (5–0)	Crisler Arena; Ann Arbor, MI
2/3/1973	No. 5	Northwestern	W 83–65	14–2 (6–0)	Assembly Hall; Bloomington, IN
2/5/1973	No. 5	at Ohio State	L 69–70	14–3 (6–1)	St. John Arena; Columbus, OH
2/10/1973	No. 4	at Purdue; Rivalry	L 69–72	14–4 (6–2)	Mackey Arena; West Lafayette, IN
2/12/1973	No. 4	Illinois; Rivalry	W 87–66	15–4 (7–2)	Assembly Hall; Bloomington, IN
2/17/1973	No. 11	at No. 4 Minnesota	L 75–82	15–5 (7–3)	Williams Arena; Minneapolis, MN
2/19/1973	No. 11	Michigan State	W 75–65	16–5 (8–3)	Assembly Hall; Bloomington, IN
2/24/1973	No. 10	Wisconsin	W 57–55	17–5 (9–3)	Assembly Hall; Bloomington, IN
3/3/1973	No. 12	at Iowa	W 80–64	18–5 (10–3)	Iowa Field House; Iowa City, IA
3/10/1973	No. 9	Purdue; Rivalry	W 77–72	19–5 (11–3)	Assembly Hall; Bloomington, IN
NCAA tournament
3/15/1973*	No. 6	vs. No. 5 Marquette; Regional semifinals	W 75–69	20–5 (11–3)	Memorial Gymnasium; Nashville, TN
3/17/1973*	No. 6	vs. No. 17 Kentucky; Elite Eight	W 72–65	21–5 (11–3)	Memorial Gymnasium; Nashville, TN
3/24/1973*	No. 6	vs. No. 1 UCLA; Final Four	L 59–70	21–6 (11–3)	St. Louis Arena; St. Louis, MO
3/26/1973*	No. 6	vs. No. 4 Providence; National third-place game	W 97–79	22–6 (11–3)	St. Louis Arena; St. Louis, MO
*Non-conference game. ^{#}Rankings from AP Poll. (#) Tournament seedings in parentheses.

== Team players drafted into the NBA ==
Round	Pick	Player	NBA club
1	17	Steve Downing	Boston Celtics
