= St. Joseph Community Consolidated School District 169 =

School district in Illinois, United States

Address
- 404 S. Fifth St. St. Joseph, Illinois, 61873; United States

District information
- Type: Public school district
- Grades: Pre K–8
- Superintendent: Todd Pence
- Schools: 2
- Budget: $10,291,000 (2016-17)
- NCES District ID: 1737380

Students and staff
- Enrollment: 868 (2018–2019)
- Teachers: 54.80 (on an FTE basis)
- Student–teacher ratio: 15.84
- District mascot: Panther
- Colors: Blue and white

Other information
- Website: www.stjoe.k12.il.us

St. Joseph Community Consolidated School District 169 is a public school district in Champaign County, Illinois, United States. It serves the village of St. Joseph, and the surrounding rural areas.

== Schools ==
There are two schools in the district:

- St. Joseph Grade School (Pre K-4)
- St. Joseph Middle School (5-8)
