= Ted Kitchel =

American basketball player (born 1959)

Personal information
- Born: November 2, 1959 (age 67) Howard County, Indiana, U.S.
- Listed height: 6 ft 8 in (2.03 m)
- Listed weight: 220 lb (100 kg)

Career information
- High school: Lewis Cass (Walton, Indiana)
- College: Indiana (1978–1983)
- NBA draft: 1983: 2nd round, 41st overall pick
- Drafted by: Milwaukee Bucks
- Position: Forward
- Number: 30

Career highlights
- NCAA champion (1981); Third-team All-American – UPI (1982); Third-team All-American – NABC (1983); 2× First-team All-Big Ten (1982, 1983)
- Stats at Basketball Reference
Medals
Representing United States
World Championships
| Silver medal – second place | 1982 Colombia | National team |

Ted Daniel Kitchel (born November 2, 1959) is an American former basketball player. He was a two-time All-American at Indiana University and represented the United States in the 1982 FIBA World Championship in Colombia. Kitchel played professionally in Italy and was inducted into the Indiana Basketball Hall of Fame in 1996.

Born in Howard County, Indiana, Kitchel grew up in a rural part of Cass County, Indiana, honing his skills on a makeshift court in a tool shed. As a senior, Kitchel led tiny Lewis Cass High School to a 20–0 regular season record and its first sectional title in 1978. Kitchel averaged 26.2 points and 13 rebounds per game as he was graduated as the school's leading scorer.

He committed to play collegiately at Indiana University for coach Bobby Knight. His freshman season in 1978–79 was limited to one game due to injury and Kitchel watched from the bench as the Hoosiers won the 1979 National Invitation Tournament. Kitchel came back the next season in a reserve role, then became a starter in 1980–81, averaging 9.2 points and 3.3 rebounds per game on the 1981 National Championship squad.

The next two seasons, Kitchel became one of the stars of the Hoosiers. He averaged 19.6 and 17.3 points per game as a junior and senior, leading the team in scoring in 1981–82 and finishing second to Randy Wittman his senior year. Kitchel was named All-Big Ten and All-America both years as he led the Hoosiers to NCAA Tournament appearances in each season.

In the Summer following his junior year, Kitchel and IU teammate Jim Thomas were named to the USA men's national team for the 1982 FIBA World Championship in Cali, Colombia. Kitchel played in six of the team's nine games, averaging 2.2 points per game as the Americans earned a silver medal, losing to the Soviet Union by a single point in the final.

Following his college career, Kitchel was selected by the Milwaukee Bucks in the second round of the 1983 NBA draft (41st pick overall), but did not make the final roster. Kitchel played professionally in Italy.

Since the end of his playing days, Kitchel has remained a familiar face to IU fans as color commentator for Indiana games on regional television.
