= John Laskowski =

American basketball player

Personal information
- Born: June 7, 1953 (age 73) South Bend, Indiana, U.S.
- Listed height: 6 ft 6 in (1.98 m)
- Listed weight: 185 lb (84 kg)

Career information
- High school: St. Joseph's (South Bend, Indiana)
- College: Indiana (1972–1975)
- NBA draft: 1975: 2nd round, 32nd overall pick
- Drafted by: Chicago Bulls
- Playing career: 1975–1977
- Position: Shooting guard
- Number: 20, 31

Career history
- 1975–1977: Chicago Bulls
- Stats at NBA.com
- Stats at Basketball Reference

John Laskowski (born June 7, 1953) is an American former professional basketball player. He played two seasons in the National Basketball Association (NBA).

== College career ==
A 6'6" shooting guard born in South Bend, Indiana, Laskowski played basketball for Bob Knight and the Indiana Hoosiers from 1971 to 1975. He averaged 10.8 points per game and 3.8 rebounds per game in three seasons as his team's sixth man, earning him the nickname "Super-Sub."

== Professional basketball career ==
In 1975 he was selected by the Chicago Bulls in the second round of the National Basketball Association draft and by the Kentucky Colonels in the fourth round of the 1975 ABA draft. He played two seasons with the Bulls, averaging 7.1 points and 2.4 rebounds.

== Later life ==
Since retiring as a player, Laskowski has worked as a television color commentator and play-by-play analyst for Indiana University basketball games for the Big Ten Network. He also authored the 2003 book Tales from the Hoosier Locker Room (ISBN 1582615845). He was inducted into the Indiana Basketball Hall of Fame in 1999. In 2018, he opened a Culver's restaurant in Bloomington, Indiana.

== Career statistics ==
Legend
GP	Games played	GS	Games started	MPG	Minutes per game
FG%	Field goal percentage	3P%	3-point field goal percentage	FT%	Free throw percentage
RPG	Rebounds per game	APG	Assists per game	SPG	Steals per game
BPG	Blocks per game	PPG	Points per game	**Bold**	Career high

=== NBA ===
==== Regular season ====
Year	Team	GP	GS	MPG	FG%	FT%	RPG	APG	SPG	BPG	PPG
1975–76	Chicago	**71**	**40**	**22.1**	**.412**	.725	**3.1**	.8	**.8**	**.1**	**9.2**
1976–77	Chicago	47	5	12.0	.354	**.900**	1.3	**.9**	.7	.0	3.8
Career		118	45	18.1	.398	.760	2.4	.8	.7	.1	7.1
