= Randy Wittman =

American basketball player and coach (born 1959)

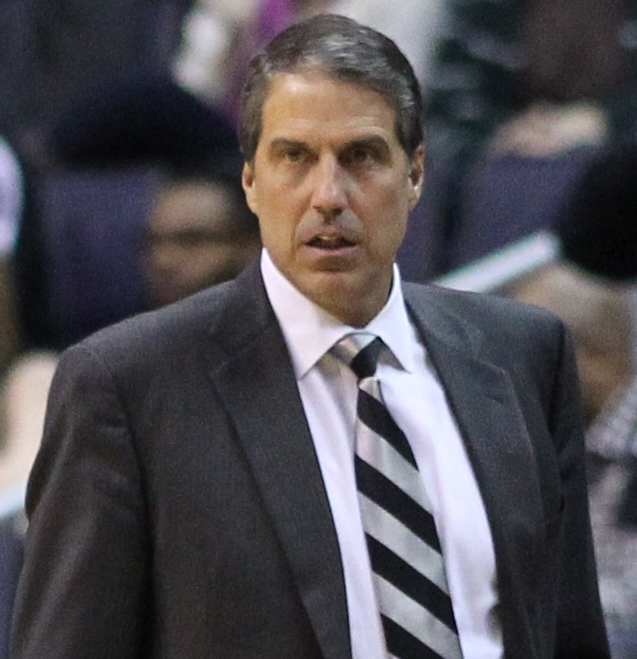
- Wittman in 2011 as Wizards assistant coach

Personal information
- Born: October 28, 1959 (age 67) Indianapolis, Indiana, U.S.
- Listed height: 6 ft 6 in (1.98 m)
- Listed weight: 210 lb (95 kg)

Career information
- High school: Ben Davis (Indianapolis, Indiana)
- College: Indiana (1978–1983)
- NBA draft: 1983: 1st round, 22nd overall pick
- Drafted by: Washington Bullets
- Playing career: 1983–1992
- Position: Shooting guard
- Number: 10, 14
- Coaching career: 1992–2016

Career history

Playing
- 1983–1988: Atlanta Hawks
- 1988–1989: Sacramento Kings
- 1989–1992: Indiana Pacers

Coaching
- 1992–1993: Indiana Pacers (assistant)
- 1993–1994: Dallas Mavericks (assistant)
- 1994–1999: Minnesota Timberwolves (assistant)
- 1999–2001: Cleveland Cavaliers
- 2001–2005: Minnesota Timberwolves (assistant)
- 2005–2006: Orlando Magic (assistant)
- 2006–2008: Minnesota Timberwolves
- 2009–2012: Washington Wizards (assistant)
- 2012–2016: Washington Wizards

Career highlights
- NCAA champion (1981); Consensus second-team All-American (1983)

Career NBA statistics
- Points: 4,034 (7.4 ppg)
- Rebounds: 760 (1.4 rpg)
- Assists: 1,201 (2.2 apg)
- Stats at NBA.com
- Stats at Basketball Reference

Randy Scott Wittman (born October 28, 1959) is an American former professional basketball player at the guard position and former coach of the NBA's Cleveland Cavaliers, Minnesota Timberwolves, and Washington Wizards. Resulting from his five-year tenure as the Wizards head coach, Wittman received media praise for his defensive coaching style and competitive spirit.

== Playing career ==
=== High school ===
Wittman starred for Indianapolis Ben Davis High School from 1975 to 1978. He averaged more than 23 points a game for Ben Davis, which remains the second-highest average at the school, and became one of the nation's top recruits. In 1978 he was second to Brad Leaf of all Marion County, Indiana, scorers.

=== College ===
The 6'6" Wittman played college basketball from 1979 to 1983 for Bob Knight and the Indiana University Hoosiers. The 1979–80 Hoosiers, led by Isiah Thomas, won the Big Ten championship and advanced to the 1980 Sweet Sixteen. The following season, in 1980–81, the Hoosiers once again won a conference title and advanced to the NCAA Championship, beating the North Carolina Tar Heels.

The Hoosiers trailed the entire first half of the game until Wittman scored at the halftime buzzer with a deep corner shot. The Hoosiers went on to win the game by a 63–50 tally, making the 1981 NCAA tournament the school's fourth national title.

Wittman became a member of Indiana's Hall of Fame and was named to Indiana's Silver Anniversary Basketball Team, in March 1996.

=== Professional ===
Wittman was selected by the Washington Bullets with the 22nd pick of the 1983 NBA draft. However, he never played for the Bullets with his rights being traded to the Atlanta Hawks.

Wittman spent the early portion of his career with the Hawks, sharing backcourt with Glenn "Doc" Rivers and Anthony "Spud" Webb, and starting most of the games from 1985 to 1988 (while averaging 12 points and 3.5 assists in those years combined).

After a small spell with the Sacramento Kings, he became a fringe player with the Indiana Pacers, retiring in 1991–92 after three unassuming years. For his career, Wittman averaged 7.4 points, 1.1 rebounds and 2.2 assists per game, shooting just over 50% from the field.

== Coaching career ==
In 1992, Wittman began his NBA coaching career as an assistant coach, first with the Pacers. He spent one season in Indianapolis and another with the Dallas Mavericks (and later with the Orlando Magic).

Subsequently, Wittman spent from 1994 to 1999 with the Minnesota Timberwolves, in the same capacity. During that period, he helped in the development of Wolves' star forward Kevin Garnett. Wittman then served as head coach of the Cleveland Cavaliers for two seasons, (1999–2001), compiling a record of 62–102.

On January 23, 2007, Wittman became the head coach of the Timberwolves, succeeding Dwane Casey; he had already started the season as assistant to the former.

On December 8, 2008, club owner Glen Taylor fired Wittman after a 4–19 start, asking Kevin McHale to step in, in a complete change of the organization's structure, as the former Boston Celtics great had been Minnesota's vice-president of basketball operations since 1995.

Wittman became acting head coach of the Washington Wizards, accepting the position after Flip Saunders was fired in January 2012 for a 2–15 start. On June 4, 2012, the Wizards announced that Wittman would be retained as the official head coach of the team for the 2012–2013 season.

The Wizards improved from 29–53 to 44–38 during the 2013–14 season, which included advancing to the second round of the playoffs for just the third time since 1979 before losing to the Indiana Pacers in six games. The Wizards had a 5–1 record in away games during both series, but were unable to win a home game in the second round. Wittman was praised for his strategy and leadership throughout the playoffs by both players and management alike.

Wittman signed an extension to remain head coach of the Wizards on June 3, 2014.

The Wizards fired Wittman on April 13, 2016, after the team missed the playoffs.

On September 18, 2017, Wittman was hired by the Orlando Magic as a coaching consultant.

In 2021, Wittman began a role as a contract advisor for Indiana University and head basketball coach Mike Woodson.

== Personal life ==
His son Ryan Wittman starred for the Cornell Big Red basketball team; he helped lead the Big Red to their first NCAA Tournament appearance in 20 years during the 2007–08 season, again in 2009, and to Cornell's first-ever NCAA basketball tournament victories in 2010 over the Temple Owls and Wisconsin Badgers as the Big Red made its first-ever trip to the NCAA Men's Sweet 16.

== Career playing statistics ==
Legend
GP	Games played	GS	Games started	MPG	Minutes per game
FG%	Field goal percentage	3P%	3-point field goal percentage	FT%	Free throw percentage
RPG	Rebounds per game	APG	Assists per game	SPG	Steals per game
BPG	Blocks per game	PPG	Points per game	**Bold**	Career high
*	Led the league

=== NBA ===
==== Regular season ====
Year	Team	GP	GS	MPG	FG%	3P%	FT%	RPG	APG	SPG	BPG	PPG
1983–84	Atlanta	78	1	13.7	.503	.400	.609	.9	.9	.2	.0	4.5
1984–85	Atlanta	41	22	28.5	**.531**	.286	.732	1.8	3.0	.7	**.2**	9.9
1985–86	Atlanta	81	79	**34.1**	.530	.313	.770	**2.1**	**3.8**	**1.0**	**.2**	**12.9**
1986–87	Atlanta	71	65	28.9	.503	.333	.787	1.7	3.0	.5	**.2**	12.7
1987–88	Atlanta	**82**	**82***	29.4	.478	–	.798	**2.1**	3.7	.6	**.2**	10.0
1988–89	Sacramento	31	2	13.4	.427	**.500**	.727	.8	1.0	.3	.0	3.8
1988–89	Indiana	33	11	21.3	.473	**.500**	.632	1.6	2.4	.4	.1	5.2
1989–90	Indiana	61	0	8.9	**.508**	**.500**	**.833**	.5	.6	.1	.1	2.1
1990–91	Indiana	41	0	8.7	.443	.000	.667	.8	.6	.2	.1	1.8
1991–92	Indiana	24	0	4.8	.421	–	.500	.4	.5	.1	.0	.7
Career		543	262	21.4	.501	.321	.753	1.4	2.2	.5	.1	7.4

==== Playoffs ====
Year	Team	GP	GS	MPG	FG%	3P%	FT%	RPG	APG	SPG	BPG	PPG
1984	Atlanta	5	0	19.2	.541	–	–	1.8	2.2	.2	.0	8.0
1986	Atlanta	9	9	**38.7**	.526	.000	.692	**2.7**	3.3	**1.1**	.1	**17.8**
1987	Atlanta	9	9	33.3	.554	–	**.824**	2.0	3.3	.4	**.4**	16.4
1988	Atlanta	**12**	**12**	28.7	.541	–	.714	2.2	**3.6**	.6	.1	11.4
1990	Indiana	2	0	5.5	.000	–	–	.5	.0	.0	.0	.0
1991	Indiana	1	0	6.0	**1.000**	–	–	.0	1.0	.0	.0	2.0
Career		38	30	29.1	.540	.000	.740	2.1	3.0	.6	.2	12.8

== Head coaching record ==
Legend
Regular season	G	Games coached	W	Games won	L	Games lost	W–L %	Win–loss %
Playoffs	PG	Playoff games	PW	Playoff wins	PL	Playoff losses	PW–L %	Playoff win–loss %

Team	Year	G	W	L	W–L%	Finish	PG	PW	PL	PW–L%	Result
Cleveland	1999–00	82	32	50	.390	6th in Central	—	—	—	—	Missed playoffs
Cleveland	2000–01	82	30	52	.366	6th in Central	—	—	—	—	Missed playoffs
Minnesota	2006–07	42	12	30	.286	4th in Northwest	—	—	—	—	Missed playoffs
Minnesota	2007–08	82	22	60	.268	5th in Northwest	—	—	—	—	Missed playoffs
Minnesota	2008–09	19	4	15	.211	(fired)	—	—	—	—	—
Washington	2011–12	49	18	31	.367	4th in Southeast	—	—	—	—	Missed playoffs
Washington	2012–13	82	29	53	.354	3rd in Southeast	—	—	—	—	Missed playoffs
Washington	2013–14	82	44	38	.537	2nd in Southeast	11	6	5	.545	Lost in Conference semifinals
Washington	2014–15	82	46	36	.561	2nd in Southeast	10	6	4	.600	Lost in Conference semifinals
Washington	2015–16	82	41	41	.500	4th in Southeast	—	—	—	—	Missed playoffs
Career		684	278	406	.406		21	12	9	.571	
