= List of East Carolina Pirates men's basketball head coaches =

The following is a list of East Carolina Pirates men's basketball head coaches. There have been 24 head coaches of the Pirates in their 92-season history.

East Carolina's current head coach is Michael Schwartz. He was hired as the Pirates' head coach in March 2022, replacing Joe Dooley, who was fired after the 2021–22 season.

No.	Tenure	Coach	Years	Record	Pct.
1	1931–1932	C. W. Porter	1	8–9	.471
2	1932–1934	Kenneth Beatty	2	12–17	.414
3	1934–1936	Doc Mathis	2	18–17	.514
4	1936–1937; 1939–1940	Bo Farley	2	24–18	.571
5	1937–1938	J. D. Alexander	1	8–12	.400
6	1938–1939	Gordon Gilbert	1	17–10	.630
7	1940–1943	John Christenbury	3	25–15	.625
–	1944–1945	No coach	1	8–6	.571
8	1945–1946; 1959–1963	Earl Smith	5	69–49	.585
9	1946–1947	Jim Johnson	1	17–10	.630
10	1947–1959	Howard Porter	12	182–102	.641
11	1963–1966	Wendell Carr	3	32–40	.444
12	1966–1974	Tom Quinn	8	102–107	.488
13	1974–1977	Dave Patton	3	40–42	.488
14	1977–1979	Larry Gillman	2	21–32	.396
15	1979–1982	Dave Odom	3	40–40	.500
16	1982–1987	Charlie Harrison	5	51–90	.362
17	1987–1991	Mike Steele	4	48–68	.414
18	1991–1995	Eddie Payne	4	56–58	.491
19	1995–1999; 2018–2022	Joe Dooley	8	101–119	.459
20	1999–2005	Bill Herrion	6	70–98	.417
21	2005–2007	Ricky Stokes	2	14–44	.241
22	2007–2010	Mack McCarthy	3	34–57	.374
23	2010–2017 (Note: Lebo resigned on November 29, 2017. Perry served as interim coach for the remainder of the season.)	Jeff Lebo	8	116–120	.492
–	2017–2018*	Michael Perry	1	8–16	.333
24	2022–present	Michael Schwartz	1	16–17	.485
Totals		24 coaches	92 seasons	1,137–1,213	.484
Records updated through end of 2022–23 season * - Denotes interim head coach. Source
