= List of East Carolina Pirates men's basketball seasons =

This is a list of seasons completed by the East Carolina Pirates men's college basketball team.

== Seasons ==
Statistics overview
Season	Coach	Overall	Conference	Standing	Postseason
Wendell Carr (Southern Conference) (1965–1966)
1965–66	Wendell Carr	11–15	5–7	5th	
Tom Quinn (Southern Conference) (1966–1974)
1966–67	Tom Quinn	7–17	4–8	8th	
1967–68	Tom Quinn	9–16	6–7	7th	
1968–69	Tom Quinn	17–11	9–2	2nd	
1969–70	Tom Quinn	16–10	9–2	2nd	
1970–71	Tom Quinn	13–12	7–4	4th	
1971–72	Tom Quinn	14–15	7–5	3rd	NCAA Division I First Round
1972–73	Tom Quinn	13–13	7–7	4th	
1973–74	Tom Quinn	13–12	8–6	4th	
Dave Patton (Southern Conference) (1974–1977)
1974–75	Dave Patton	19–9	11–3	2nd	NCIT Quarterfinal
1975–76	Dave Patton	11–15	7–7	T–3rd	
1976–77	Dave Patton	10–18	3–9	5th	
Larry Gillman (Independent) (1977–1979)
1977–78	Larry Gillman	9–17	–		
1978–79	Larry Gillman	12–15	–		
Dave Odom (Independent) (1979–1981)
1979–80	Dave Odom	16–11	–		
1980–81	Dave Odom	12–14	–		
Dave Odom (Colonial Athletic Association) (1981–1982)
1981–82	Dave Odom	10–17	2–8	7th	
Charlie Harrison (Colonial Athletic Association) (1982–1987)
1982–83	Charlie Harrison	16–13	3–7	5th	
1983–84	Charlie Harrison	4–24	1–9	6th	
1984–85	Charlie Harrison	7–21	1–13	8th	
1985–86	Charlie Harrison	12–16	6–8	T–4th	
1986–87	Charlie Harrison	12–16	4–11	7th	
Mike Steele (Colonial Athletic Association) (1987–1991)
1987–88	Mike Steele	8–20	3–12	8th	
1988–89	Mike Steele	15–14	6–8	T–5th	
1989–90	Mike Steele	13–18	6–8	5th	
1990–91	Mike Steele	12–16	4–10	7th	
Eddie Payne (Colonial Athletic Association) (1991–1995)
1991–92	Eddie Payne	10–18	4–10	6th	
1992–93	Eddie Payne	14–16	4–10	7th	NCAA Division I First Round
1993–94	Eddie Payne	15–12	7–8	5th	
1994–95	Eddie Payne	18–11	7–8	4th	
Joe Dooley (Colonial Athletic Association) (1995–1999)
1995–96	Joe Dooley	17–11	9–9	T–4th	
1996–97	Joe Dooley	17–10	9–7	T–3rd	
1997–98	Joe Dooley	10–17	5–11	T–7th	
1998–99	Joe Dooley	13–14	7–9	7th	
Bill Herrion (Colonial Athletic Association) (1999–2001)
1999–00	Bill Herrion	10–18	5–11	T–8th	
2000–01	Bill Herrion	14–14	6–10	T–7th	
Bill Herrion (Conference USA) (2001–2014)
2001–02	Bill Herrion	12–18	5–11	T–11th	
2002–03	Bill Herrion	12–15	3–13	T–13th	
2003–04	Bill Herrion	13–14	5–11	11th	
2004–05	Bill Herrion	9–19	4–12	T–12th	
Ricky Stokes (Conference USA) (2005–2007)
2005–06	Ricky Stokes	8–20	2–12	12th	
2006–07	Ricky Stokes	6–24	1–15	12th	
Mack McCarthy (Conference USA) (2007–2010)
2007–08	Mack McCarthy	11–19	5–11	10th	
2008–09	Mack McCarthy	13–17	5–11	9th	
2009–10	Mack McCarthy	10–21	4–12	10th	
Jeff Lebo (Conference USA) (2010–2014)
2010–11	Jeff Lebo	18–16	8–8	T–7th	CIT First Round
2011–12	Jeff Lebo	15–16	5–11	10th	
2012–13	Jeff Lebo	23–12	9–7	T–4th	CIT Champion
2013–14	Jeff Lebo	17–17	5–11	12th	CIT First Round
Jeff Lebo (American Athletic Conference) (2014–2018)
2014–15	Jeff Lebo	14–19	6–12	T–7th	
2015–16	Jeff Lebo	12–20	4–14	T–9th	
2016–17	Jeff Lebo	15–17	6–12	9th	
2017–18	Jeff Lebo; Michael Perry	10–20^{[Note A]}	4–14	11th	
Joe Dooley (American Athletic Conference) (2018–2022)
2018–19	Joe Dooley	10–21	3–15	11th	
2019–20	Joe Dooley	11–20	5–13	11th	No postseason held
2020–21	Joe Dooley	8–11	2–8	11th	
2021–22	Joe Dooley	15–15	6–11	9th	
Michael Schwartz (American Athletic Conference) (2022–present)
2022–23	Michael Schwartz	16–17	6–12	9th	
2023–24	Michael Schwartz	15–18	7–11	T–8th	
2024–25	Michael Schwartz	19–14	10–8	T–5th	
2025–26	Michael Schwartz	11–20	6–12	12th	
Total:		1,167–1,224			
National champion Postseason invitational champion Conference regular season champion Conference regular season and conference tournament champion Division regular season champion Division regular season and conference tournament champion Conference tournament champion

^A. Lebo coached the first 6 games of the season, going 2–4. Perry went 8–16 as the interim head coach.
