= 1980–81 Iowa State Cyclones men's basketball team =

American college basketball season

1980–81 Iowa State Cyclones men's basketball
- Conference: Big Eight Conference
- Record: 9–18 (2–12 Big Eight)
- Head coach: Johnny Orr (1st season)
- Assistant coach: Charlie Harrison
- Home arena: Hilton Coliseum

1980–81 Big Eight Conference men's basketball standings
	Conf.				Overall
Team	W		L	PCT	W		L	PCT
Missouri	10	–	4	.714	22	–	10	.688
Kansas State	9	–	5	.643	24	–	9	.727
Nebraska	9	–	5	.643	15	–	12	.556
Kansas †	9	–	5	.643	24	–	8	.750
Oklahoma State	8	–	6	.571	18	–	9	.667
Colorado	5	–	9	.357	16	–	12	.571
Oklahoma	4	–	10	.286	9	–	18	.333
Iowa State	2	–	12	.143	9	–	18	.333
† 1981 Big Eight tournament winner Rankings from AP Poll

The 1980–81 Iowa State Cyclones men's basketball team represented Iowa State University during the 1980–81 NCAA Division I men's basketball season. The Cyclones were coached by Johnny Orr, who was in his 1st season. They played their home games at Hilton Coliseum in Ames, Iowa.

They finished the season 9–18, 2–12 in Big Eight play to finish in eighth place. The Cyclones lost in the first round of the Big Eight tournament to Missouri, falling 95–70.

== Roster ==
1980–81 Iowa State Cyclones men's basketball team
Players
Coaches

Pos.	#	Name	Height	Weight	Year	Hometown
F		Robert Estes	6 ft 6 in (1.98 m)	—	Jr
F		Ron Harris	6 ft 3 in (1.91 m)	—	Fr
G		Lefty Moore (C)	5 ft 10 in (1.78 m)	—
C		Ron Falenschek	6 ft 11 in (2.11 m)	—	So
G		Jon Ness	6 ft 2 in (1.88 m)	—	Sr
C		John Kunnert	6 ft 6 in (1.98 m)	—
G		Malvin Warrick	6 ft 2 in (1.88 m)	—
G		Charles Harris	6 ft 2 in (1.88 m)	—	Sr
F		Bill Buchanan	6 ft 6 in (1.98 m)	—
G		Terrence Allen	6 ft 0 in (1.83 m)	—	Fr
C		Derrick Thomas	6 ft 6 in (1.98 m)	—
		Doug Jones	—	—
		Tony Rasheed	—	—
		Mike Decello	—	—

Head coach

- Johnny Orr (Beloit)

Assistant coach(es)

- Charlie Harrison

Legend

- (C) Team captain
- (S) Suspended
- (I) Ineligible
- (W) Walk-on
- Injured
- Current redshirt

== Schedule and results ==
Date time, TV	Rank^{#}	Opponent^{#}	Result	Record	Site city, state
Regular season
December 1, 1980*; 7:30 pm		at Vanderbilt	L 87–97	0–1	Memorial Gymnasium (15,545); Nashville, Tennessee
December 4, 1980*; 7:35 pm, Heritage		Drake; Iowa Big Four	W 74–72	1–1	Hilton Coliseum (13,268); Ames, Iowa
December 6, 1980*; 7:35 pm		Northern Iowa; Iowa Big Four	W 83–69	2–1	Hilton Coliseum (8,988); Ames, Iowa
December 9, 1980*; 7:35 pm, ESPN (delay)		at SMU	L 55–58	2–2	Moody Coliseum (3,106); Dallas, Texas
December 12, 1980*; 7:38 pm, KETV		Creighton	L 73–77	2–3	Hilton Coliseum (9,527); Ames, Iowa
December 20, 1980*; 3:05 pm, Iowa Basketball Network		at No. 16 Iowa; CyHawk Rivalry	L 59–85	2–4	Iowa Fieldhouse (13,365); Iowa City, Iowa
December 23, 1980*; 7:35 pm, Hawkeye Cablevision		Alabama-Birmingham	W 71–70	3–4	Hilton Coliseum (6,129); Ames, Iowa
December 29, 1980*; 7:35 pm		vs. East Carolina; Elm City Classic Semifinals	W 80–73	4–4	Alumni Hall (1,450); Fairfield, Connecticut
December 30, 1980*; 7:45 pm		at Fairfield; Elm City Classic Championship	W 47–46	5–4	Alumni Hall (1,600); Fairfield, Connecticut
January 5, 1981*; 7:35 pm, Heritage		Wisconsin-Parkside	W 67–58	6–4	Hilton Coliseum (6,837); Ames, Iowa
January 10, 1981*; 7:35 pm, Heritage/Iowa Cable Network		Western Illinois	W 94–72	7–4	Hilton Coliseum (10,232); Ames, Iowa
January 14, 1981; 8:10 pm, Heritage/USA		at Kansas	L 58–70	7–5 (0–1)	Allen Fieldhouse (14,850); Lawrence, Kansas
January 17, 1981; 1:30 pm		at Missouri	L 69–92	7–6 (0–2)	Hearnes Center (11,112); Columbia, Missouri
January 19, 1981*; 7:30 pm		at Saint Louis	L 59–61	7–7	Checkerdome (2,556); St. Louis, Missouri
January 21, 1981; 7:35 pm		Oklahoma	W 88–67	8–7 (1–2)	Hilton Coliseum (8,247); Ames, Iowa
January 24, 1981; 3:00 pm		at Oklahoma State	L 75–81	8–8 (1–3)	Gallagher Hall (6,700); Stillwater, Oklahoma
January 28, 1981; 7:35 pm		Nebraska	L 56–61	8–9 (1–4)	Hilton Coliseum (9,017); Ames, Iowa
January 31, 1981; 7:35 pm		Kansas State	L 62–75	8–10 (1–5)	Hilton Coliseum (11,238); Ames, Iowa
February 4, 1981; 9:05 pm		at Colorado	L 62–75	8–11 (1–6)	Coors Events Center (4,750); Boulder, Colorado
February 7, 1981; 2:38 pm, NBC–TVS Big Eight		Missouri	L 56–70	8–12 (1–7)	Hilton Coliseum (10,018); Ames, Iowa
February 10, 1981; 7:35 pm		at Oklahoma	L 66–78	8–13 (1–8)	Lloyd Noble Center (2,038); Norman, Oklahoma
February 14, 1981; 7:35 pm		Kansas	L 49–51	8–14 (1–9)	Hilton Coliseum (10,230); Ames, Iowa
February 18, 1981; 7:35 pm		at Nebraska	L 61–81	8–15 (1–10)	Devaney Sports Center (11,118); Lincoln, Nebraska
February 21, 1981; 7:35 pm		Oklahoma State	L 69–76	8–16 (1–11)	Hilton Coliseum (7,665); Ames, Iowa
February 25, 1981; 8:05 pm		at Kansas State	L 60–67	8–17 (1–12)	Ahearn Fieldhouse (11,220); Manhattan, Kansas
February 28, 1981; 7:35 pm		Colorado	W 67–56	9–17 (2–12)	Hilton Coliseum (7,826); Ames, Iowa
Big Eight tournament
March 3, 1981; 8:05 pm	(8)	at (1) Missouri; Big Eight tournament quarterfinals	L 70–95	9–18	Hearnes Center (7,303); Columbia, Missouri
*Non-conference game. ^{#}Rankings from AP poll. (#) Tournament seedings in parentheses. All times are in Central Time.
