= Cincinnati–Louisville rivalry =

American college sports rivalry

- Cincinnati Bearcats Louisville Cardinals
- Sport: Football, basketball, others
- First meeting: 1921

Locations of Cincinnati and Louisville

The Cincinnati–Louisville rivalry is a college sports rivalry between the University of Cincinnati Bearcats and the University of Louisville Cardinals. The rivalry between these two schools, located about 100 miles (160 km) apart, dates to their first men's college basketball game in 1921, and has continued across all sports, with the football series gaining attention as well, having started in 1929. Both universities share common characteristics, both being over 200 year old institutions in urban settings. The schools have also shared conferences historically, with the rivalry stretching over the span of four conferences from the Missouri Valley Conference, to the Metro Conference to Conference USA, and more recently in the Big East Conference, which in 2013 was renamed to the American Athletic Conference. After the 2013–14 season, Louisville joined the Atlantic Coast Conference and since then the rivalry has been put on hiatus in football and basketball. Cincinnati officially joined the Big 12 conference in 2023. However, many other sports at the universities, such as baseball, continue to battle periodically.

== History ==
College Comparison
	Cincinnati	Louisville
Founded	1819	1798
Type	Public	Public
Location	Cincinnati, OH	Louisville, KY
Conference	Big 12	ACC
Students	53,235	24,123
School colors		
Nickname	Bearcats	Cardinals
Stadium	Nippert Stadium	Cardinal Stadium
Arena	Fifth Third Arena	KFC Yum! Center

Both universities have traced parallel paths, from their early foundation in the early nineteenth century as municipal universities to their later growth into state sponsored institutions in the 1960s and 70s. Due to their close proximity, the universities became early athletic opponents as college athletics developed first facing off in 1921 in a men's college basketball game. Additionally, this proximity led to both schools being members of the Missouri Valley Conference, Metro Conference, Conference USA, and the Big East Conference historically. While the rivalry was represented annually in football from 1966 to 1992 and 1996 to 2013, the true intensity of the rivalry was felt on the basketball court. Legendary coaches Denny Crum, Bob Huggins, and Rick Pitino each played their part in famous wins for each program and fanning the flames of the matchup.

In the last year of the rivalry in football and basketball for the foreseeable future, the contests lived up to the pressure. In the battle for The Keg of Nails, Teddy Bridgewater led the No. 19 Cardinals to an overtime comeback at Nippert Stadium much to the ire of the Bearcat faithful. On the hardwood both teams would claim upset, ranked wins at their opponent's home court. Sean Kilpatrick lead the Bearcats to a 69–66 victory at the KFC Yum! Center while Russ Smith and the Cardinals would beat the Bearcats 58–57 at Fifth Third Arena in their last matchup as conference foes.

On April 30, 2019 John Brannen and Chris Mack exchanged tweets announcing a renewal of the Cincinnati–Louisville rivalry with the first game at Fifth Third Arena. The series was delayed first due to the COVID-19 pandemic. Chris Mack later confirmed that the series would not be played during the 2021–22 season, putting the resumption of the rivalry into question.

== Men's basketball ==
Cincinnati–Louisville basketball rivalry
- Cincinnati Bearcats Louisville Cardinals
- Sport: College Basketball
- First meeting: January 17, 1921; Cincinnati 36 – Louisville 16
- Latest meeting: November 21, 2025; Louisville 74 – Cincinnati 64
- Next meeting: 2026

Statistics
- Total meetings: 101
- All-time series: Louisville leads, 57–44
- Longest win streak: Louisville, 16 (January 19, 1977 – March 8, 1984)
- Current win streak: Louisville, 1 (2025–present)

Men's Basketball Comparison
	Cincinnati	Louisville
First season	1901	1911
NCAA championships	2	3*
NCAA tournament appearances	33	44*
Conference championships	29	23*
Conference tournament championships	12	19*
All-Americans	44	25
Consensus 1st Team All-Americans	8	7
Player of the Year	3	1
Conference Player of the Year	10	10

Cincinnati and Louisville were rivals, first playing in 1921, until the 2010–14 NCAA conference realignment put the contest on hiatus, as Louisville moved to the Atlantic Coast Conference on July 1, 2014. The teams have faced off 99 times in basketball series history, with Louisville leading the all-time series 53–43.

The Bearcats and Cardinals have played in eight conference tournaments, with the Bearcats and Cardinals tied at 4–4. Louisville won all 3 games in the Metro Conference with Cincinnati winning all 3 games in Conference USA. The teams split 1–1 in the Big East tournament.

The teams have also met twice in the NCAA Tournament, tied overall at 1–1.

=== Notable games ===
March 21, 1959: The Bearcats met the Cardinals on their home court, Freedom Hall, for the Third Place game of the NCAA tournament. Oscar Robertson would score 39 points, earning the first triple double in Final Four history, leading his Bearcats to a 98–85 victory.

January 21, 1967: The No. 2 Cardinals led by eventual All-American Wes Unseld visited the Armory Fieldhouse to take on the Bearcats. Despite the difference in talent, the entire game was close. With two seconds remaining, Bearcat Gordie Smith threw in a fifteen-foot jumper to win the game 59–58 for UC.

March 20, 1975: The No. 3 Cardinals collided with the No. 12 Bearcats in the Sweet Sixteen of the NCAA tournament. Louisville took a solid lead in the first half which proved too much for the Bearcats to overcome, seeing the Cardinals win 78–63. Louisville would go on to finish 3rd overall in the tournament.

January 7, 1978: The Bearcats entered the matchup, tied for the longest home winning streak in the nation at 60 games. The first matchup at Riverfront Coliseum, No. 10 Louisville would snap the Cincinnati streak, winning 78–75.

March 8, 1981: The reigning National Champion Cardinals took on the Bearcats in the final of the Metro Conference tournament at Freedom Hall. In an ugly, low-scoring affair, the Cardinals were triumphant in the game to a score of 42–31.

January 20, 1986: The Bearcats headed to Freedom Hall to take on the No. 18, and eventual national champion, Cardinals. With Louisville pulling ahead their lead, Bearcat Roger McClendon would score 24 of his 35 points in the second half to gain an 84–82 victory for Cincinnati.

March 8, 1996: In 1991 Cincinnati left the Metro Conference to form the Great Midwest Conference, putting the rivalry on a five-year hiatus. In 1995, the Great Midwest and Metro combined to form Conference USA bringing the Bearcats and Cardinals back into the same conference. No. 21 Louisville took the first game 72–66 at the Shoemaker Center in February, but with revenge on their mind the Bob Huggins lead No. 8 Bearcats defeated No. 22 Louisville in the Conference tournament Quarterfinals 92–81. In the NCAA tournament the Bearcats advanced to the Elite Eight and the Cardinals made it to the Sweet Sixteen.

February 22, 2003: No. 4 Louisville traveled to Cincinnati and were stunned by the 31 point performance of Leonard Stokes that would help navigate the Bearcats to the 101–80 upset of the Cardinals. The Bearcats would also set a school record, shooting 42-of-58 on free throws in the game.

March 11, 2004: Cincinnati and Louisville faced off in the 2004 Conference USA men's basketball tournament hosted at US Bank Arena in Cincinnati. After splitting the regular season matchups, the Bearcats proved too much for Rick Pitino's Cardinals winning 64–62 after Armein Kirkland banked a shot in for the Bearcats with only 16.9 seconds remaining. The No. 13 Bearcats would go on to win the conference tournament. This game was Huggins's last victory in the matchup.

March 10, 2012†: In an unlikely Big East tournament championship game, Louisville and Cincinnati faced off, with Mick Cronin coaching against his former boss Pitino. Cincinnati fought their way past No. 13 Georgetown in double overtime and No. 2 Syracuse while Louisville beat No. 9 Marquette and No. 23 Notre Dame. Louisville ended up winning the tilt 50–44, in what was the lowest scoring championship game in Big East history. Both teams made runs in the NCAA tournament with Cincinnati advancing to the Sweet Sixteen and Louisville making it to the Final Four.

February 22, 2014†: In the last matchup between rivals before Louisville left for the Atlantic Coast Conference the teams met at Fifth Third Arena. No. 7 Cincinnati and No. 11 Louisville played in a memorable, blow-for-blow game which would see Sean Kilpatrick record 28 points. However, in the dwindling seconds of the second half, Russ Smith scored with 3 seconds remaining, earning Louisville a 58–57 victory.

November 23, 2022: In their first matchup since 2014 the two rivals played in a 7th place game at the Maui Invitational. This game was not as memorable as the last as Cincinnati routed Louisville 81–62.

† Denotes game vacated by Louisville

=== Game results ===
Rankings are from the AP Poll (1936–present)

Cincinnati victories	Louisville victories	Tie games	Vacated wins (Note: Louisville has vacated all of its victories from the 2011–12, 2012–13, 2013–14, 2014–15 seasons. These 123 wins are not included in Louisville's all-time record, nor are the victories against Cincinnati during this span counted in the series record between the two teams.)

No.	Date	Location	Winner	Score
1	January 17, 1921	Schmidlapp Gym	Cincinnati	36–16
2	December 20, 1924	Schmidlapp Gym	Cincinnati	29–18
3	December 21, 1938	Belknap Gymnasium	Cincinnati	54–41
4	December 21, 1939	Schmidlapp Gym	Cincinnati	62–17
5	January 12, 1946	Jefferson County Armory	Louisville	59–40
6	January 22, 1946	Schmidlapp Gym	Louisville	61–39
7	January 9, 1947	Schmidlapp Gym	Louisville	60–39
8	January 25, 1947	Jefferson County Armory	Louisville	71–52
9	March 21, 1959^{A}	Freedom Hall	No. 5 Cincinnati	98–85
10	December 19, 1959	Freedom Hall	Cincinnati	97–74
11	December 12, 1964	Armory Fieldhouse	Cincinnati	67–57
12	January 19, 1965	Freedom Hall	Louisville	82–80^{3OT}
13	January 22, 1966	Freedom Hall	Cincinnati	67–65
14	February 5, 1966	Armory Fieldhouse	No. 10 Cincinnati	56–54
15	January 21, 1967	Armory Fieldhouse	Cincinnati	59–58
16	February 4, 1967	Freedom Hall	No. 3 Louisville	65–57
17	January 20, 1968	Armory Fieldhouse	Cincinnati	82–72
18	February 3, 1968	Freedom Hall	Louisville	81–65
19	January 11, 1969	Armory Fieldhouse	No. 19 Cincinnati	87–75
20	February 22, 1969	Freedom Hall	No. 13 Louisville	72–68
21	January 10, 1970	Armory Fieldhouse	No. 20 Louisville	64–63
22	February 21, 1970	Freedom Hall	Cincinnati	53–52
23	January 20, 1971	Freedom Hall	Louisville	85–72
24	February 24, 1971	Armory Fieldhouse	Cincinnati	79–78
25	January 8, 1972	Armory Fieldhouse	No. 7 Louisville	84–76
26	February 23, 1972	Freedom Hall	No. 3 Louisville	93–73
27	February 5, 1973	Armory Fieldhouse	Cincinnati	81–79
28	February 24, 1973	Freedom Hall	Louisville	91–81
29	December 1, 1973	Freedom Hall	Cincinnati	65–58
30	January 9, 1974	Armory Fieldhouse	Cincinnati	77–70
31	January 7, 1975	Freedom Hall	No. 3 Louisville	82–74
32	March 20, 1975^{B}	Pan American Center	No. 3 Louisville	78–63
33	January 6, 1976	Armory Fieldhouse	No. 15 Cincinnati	77–73
34	January 19, 1977	Freedom Hall	No. 12 Louisville	83–77
35	January 7, 1978	Riverfront Coliseum	No. 10 Louisville	78–75
36	February 4, 1978	Freedom Hall	No. 9 Louisville	83–76
37	January 18, 1979	Riverfront Coliseum	No. 7 Louisville	82–77
38	February 3, 1979	Freedom Hall	No. 6 Louisville	88–85
39	February 6, 1980	Freedom Hall	No. 3 Louisville	88–73
40	February 16, 1980	Riverfront Coliseum	No. 3 Louisville	61–57
41	January 10, 1981	Riverfront Coliseum	Louisville	83–68
42	February 23, 1981	Freedom Hall	Louisville	81–67
43	March 8, 1981^{C}	Freedom Hall	No. 17 Louisville	42–31
44	January 16, 1982	Freedom Hall	No. 17 Louisville	74–56
45	February 13, 1982	Riverfront Coliseum	Louisville	67–53
46	January 3, 1983	Freedom Hall	No. 13 Louisville	65–58
47	February 2, 1983	Riverfront Coliseum	No. 12 Louisville	79–73
48	January 7, 1984	Riverfront Coliseum	Louisville	51–37
49	January 18, 1984	Freedom Hall	Louisville	78–64
50	March 8, 1984^{D}	Mid-South Coliseum	No. 18 Louisville	62–55
51	January 29, 1985	Riverfront Coliseum	Cincinnati	56–54
52	February 6, 1985	Freedom Hall	Cincinnati	69–63

No.	Date	Location	Winner	Score
53	January 20, 1986	Freedom Hall	Cincinnati	84–82
54	February 13, 1986	Riverfront Coliseum	No. 19 Louisville	74–58
55	March 7, 1986^{E}	Freedom Hall	No. 11 Louisville	86–65
56	January 22, 1987	Freedom Hall	Louisville	81–69
57	February 25, 1987	Riverfront Coliseum	Louisville	81–69
58	January 20, 1988	Cincinnati Gardens	Louisville	91–89^{OT}
59	February 15, 1988	Freedom Hall	Louisville	90–87
60	February 8, 1989	Cincinnati Gardens	No. 4 Louisville	69–66
61	March 1, 1989	Freedom Hall	Cincinnati	77–71
62	January 4, 1990	Freedom Hall	Cincinnati	71–66
63	March 1, 1990	Shoemaker Center	No. 21 Louisville	86–71
64	January 3, 1991	Shoemaker Center	Cincinnati	72–64
65	February 28, 1991	Freedom Hall	Louisville	68–61
66	February 22, 1996	Shoemaker Center	No. 21 Louisville	72–66
67	March 8, 1996^{F}	Memphis Pyramid	No. 8 Cincinnati	92–81
68	January 30, 1997	Freedom Hall	No. 9 Louisville	81–70
69	January 18, 1998	Freedom Hall	Cincinnati	71–57
70	January 29, 1998	Shoemaker Center	No. 18 Cincinnati	67–61
71	March 5, 1998^{G}	Shoemaker Center	No. 14 Cincinnati	64–50
72	January 21, 1999	Freedom Hall	No. 5 Cincinnati	81–55
73	February 21, 1999	Shoemaker Center	No. 9 Cincinnati	91–78
74	January 27, 2000	Freedom Hall	No. 1 Cincinnati	75–65
75	February 27, 2000	Shoemaker Center	No. 3 Cincinnati	68–59
76	January 13, 2001	Freedom Hall	Cincinnati	72–52
77	January 24, 2001	Shoemaker Center	Louisville	63–54
78	January 19, 2002	Shoemaker Center	No. 7 Cincinnati	77–50
79	February 27, 2002	Freedom Hall	Louisville	74–71
80	February 5, 2003	Freedom Hall	No. 5 Louisville	77–71
81	February 22, 2003	Shoemaker Center	Cincinnati	101–80
82	January 21, 2004	Freedom Hall	No. 5 Louisville	93–66
83	February 21, 2004	Shoemaker Center	No. 17 Cincinnati	66–61^{OT}
84	March 11, 2004^{H}	US Bank Arena	No. 13 Cincinnati	64–62
85	January 15, 2005	Shoemaker Center	No. 19 Louisville	69–66
86	February 2, 2005	Freedom Hall	No. 9 Louisville	77–70
87	January 25, 2006	Freedom Hall	No. 22 Louisville	67–50
88	February 6, 2006	Fifth Third Arena	Cincinnati	74–68
89	January 31, 2007	Fifth Third Arena	Louisville	69–53
90	January 1, 2008	Freedom Hall	Cincinnati	58–57
91	February 21, 2009	Fifth Third Arena	No. 7 Louisville	72–63
92	January 24, 2010	KFC Yum! Center	Louisville	68–60
93	March 10, 2010^{I}	Madison Square Garden	Cincinnati	69–66
94	February 16, 2011	Fifth Third Arena	Cincinnati	63–54
95	February 23, 2012	Fifth Third Arena	Cincinnati	60–56
96	March 10, 2012^{J}	Madison Square Garden	Louisville^{†}	50–44
97	March 4, 2013	KFC Yum! Center	No. 8 Louisville^{†}	67–51
98	January 30, 2014	KFC Yum! Center	No. 13 Cincinnati	69–66
99	February 22, 2014	Fifth Third Arena	No. 11 Louisville^{†}	58–57
100	November 23, 2022^{K}	Lahaina Civic Center	Cincinnati	81–62
101	November 21, 2025	Heritage Bank Center	No. 6 Louisville	74–64
Series: Louisville leads 54–44
† Vacated by Louisville.

==== Notes ====
^{A} 1959 NCAA Third Place Game
^{B} 1975 NCAA Sweet Sixteen
^{C} 1981 Metro Conference men's basketball tournament
^{D} 1984 Metro Conference men's basketball tournament
^{E} 1986 Metro Conference men's basketball tournament
^{F} 1996 Conference USA men's basketball tournament
^{G} 1998 Conference USA men's basketball tournament
^{H} 2004 Conference USA men's basketball tournament
^{I} 2010 Big East men's basketball tournament
^{J} 2012 Big East men's basketball tournament
^{K} 2022 Maui Invitational Tournament

=== Wins by location ===
Category	Cincinnati	Louisville
Cincinnati, OH	25	22
Lahaina, HI	1	0
Las Cruces, NM	0	1
Louisville, KY	16	30
Memphis, TN	1	1
New York, NY	0	1

=== Wins by venue ===
Category	Cincinnati	Louisville
Armory Fieldhouse	9	2
Belknap Gymnasium	1	0
Cincinnati Gardens	0	2
Freedom Hall	14	27
Jefferson County Armory	0	2
KFC Yum! Center	2	0
Lahaina Civic Center	1	0
Madison Square Garden	0	1
Memphis Pyramid	1	0
Mid-South Coliseum	0	1
Pan American Center	0	1
Riverfront Coliseum; US Bank Arena; Heritage Bank Center	2	10
Schmidlapp Gym	3	2
Shoemaker Center; Fifth Third Arena	11	6

== Women’s basketball ==
Louisville leads the all time contest in women's basketball 41–27. As with men's basketball and football, the teams have not played since Louisville departed for the Atlantic Coast Conference after the 2013–14 season.

== Baseball ==
One of the series that has continued since conference realignment has been games between the baseball teams. The teams have continued to play yearly, with the two having faced off 188 times in their history after first playing in 1924. Louisville leads the series all time, 104–83 as of the 2025 season.

In 2013, Cincinnati and Louisville played the first ever college baseball game at Great American Ballpark, the home of the Cincinnati Reds on April 6, 2013. The No. 9 Cardinals would defeat the Bearcats 4–1.

On March 21, 2017, the No. 1 Louisville Cardinals played the Cincinnati Bearcats at UC Baseball Stadium. Cincinnati pulled off an upset, beating Louisville 6–3 and handing the Cardinals their first loss of the season.

On March 30, 2021, the No. 5 Louisville Cardinals were again upset by the Bearcats, 13–12 in a walk-off 10th-inning win for Cincinnati.
