= List of New Mexico Lobos men's basketball seasons =

This is a list of seasons completed by the New Mexico Lobos men's college basketball team.

== Seasons ==
Record table
Season	Coach	Overall	Conference	Standing	Postseason
No coach (Independent) (1899–1910)
1899–1900	No coach	0–1			
1901–02	No coach	2–0			
1902–03	No coach	1–2			
1904–05	No coach	1–0			
1905–06	No coach	2–2			
1906–07	No coach	1–1			
1907–08	No coach	5–1			
1908–09	No coach	1–0			
1909–10	No coach	2–3			
No coach:		15–10			
Ralph Hutchinson (Independent) (1910–1917)
1910–11	Ralph Hutchinson	4–1			
1911–12	Ralph Hutchinson	1–2			
1912–13	Ralph Hutchinson	6–0			
1913–14	Ralph Hutchinson	0–1			
1914–15	Ralph Hutchinson	8–1			
1915–16	Ralph Hutchinson	9–2			
1916–17	Ralph Hutchinson	4–1			
Ralph Hutchinson:		32–8			
John F. McGough (Independent) (1918–1919)
1918–19	John F. McGough	2–4			
John F. McGough:		2–4			
Roy W. Johnson (Independent) (1919–1931)
1919–20	Roy W. Johnson	0–3			
1921–22	Roy W. Johnson	0–2			
1922–23	Roy W. Johnson	2–7			
1923–24	Roy W. Johnson	5–3			
1924–25	Roy W. Johnson	12–1			
1925–26	Roy W. Johnson	12–2			
1926–27	Roy W. Johnson	13–4			
1927–28	Roy W. Johnson	12–7			
1928–29	Roy W. Johnson	14–9			
1929–30	Roy W. Johnson	16–4			
Tom Churchill (Independent) (1930–1931)
1930–31	Tom Churchill	9–7			
Tom Churchill (Border Conference) (1931–1933)
1931–32	Tom Churchill	10–6	5–5	3rd	
1932–33	Tom Churchill	13–6	8–6	4th	
Tom Churchill:		32–19	13–11		
Roy W. Johnson (Border Conference) (1933–1940)
1933–34	Roy W. Johnson	16–4	6–4	3rd	
1934–35	Roy W. Johnson	10–10	7–9	3rd	
1935–36	Roy W. Johnson	16–10	11–9	4th	
1936–37	Roy W. Johnson	12–14	10–10	4th	
1937–38	Roy W. Johnson	9–16	6–10	5th	
1938–39	Roy W. Johnson	4–21	4–16	7th	
1939–40	Roy W. Johnson	3–22	2–14	6th	
Roy W. Johnson:		165–146	46–72		
Benjamin Sacks (Independent) (1940–1941)
1940–41	Benjamin Sacks	5–18			
Benjamin Sacks:		5–18			
Willis Barnes (Border Conference) (1941–1943)
1941–42	Willis Barnes	9–13	5–11	8th	
1942–43	Willis Barnes	3–17	1–11	7th	
Willis Barnes:		12–30	6–22		
George White (Border Conference) (1943–1944)
1943–44	George White	11–2	3–0	1st	
George White:		11–2	3–0		
Woody Clements (Border Conference) (1944–1951)
1944–45	Woody Clements	14–2	12–0	1st	
1945–46	Woody Clements	16–9	13–8	4th	
1946–47	Woody Clements	11–8	10–6	3rd	NAIB First Round
1947–48	Woody Clements	14–15	8–8	T–4th	
1948–49	Woody Clements	10–12	7–9		
1949–50	Woody Clements	5–19	4–12		
1950–51	Woody Clements	13–11	9–7	T–4th	
Berl Huffman (Mountain States Athletic Conference) (1951–1952)
1951–52	Berl Huffman	6–19	1–13	8th	
Berl Huffman:		6–19	1–13		
Woody Clements (Mountain States Athletic Conference) (1952–1955)
1952–53	Woody Clements	10–14	5–9	T–5th	
1953–54	Woody Clements	11–11	5–9	6th	
1954–55	Woody Clements	7–17	2–12	8th	
Woody Clements:		82–72	75–90		
Bill Stockton (Mountain States Athletic Conference) (1955–1958)
1955–56	Bill Stockton	6–16	5–9	T–6th	
1956–57	Bill Stockton	5–21	1–13	8th	
1957–58	Bill Stockton	3–21	0–14	8th	
Bill Stockton:		14–58	6–36		
Bob Sweeney (Independent) (1958–1962)
1958–59	Bob Sweeney	3–19	1–13	T–7th	
1959–60	Bob Sweeney	6–19	3–11	T–6th	
1960–61	Bob Sweeney	6–17	3–11	T–7th	
1961–62	Bob Sweeney	6–20	3–11	T–7th	
Bob Sweeney:		21–75	10–46		
Bob King (Western Athletic Conference) (1962–1972)
1962–63	Bob King	16–9	4–6	4th	
1963–64	Bob King	23–6	7–3	T–1st	NIT Runner-up
1964–65	Bob King	19–8	5–5	T–2nd	NIT Quarterfinal
1965–66	Bob King	16–8	4–6	5th	
1966–67	Bob King	19–8	5–5	T–3rd	NIT Quarterfinal
1967–68	Bob King	23–5	8–2	1st	NCAA University Division Sweet Sixteen
1968–69	Bob King	17–9	4–6	T–5th	
1969–70	Bob King	13–13	7–7	T–5th	
1970–71	Bob King	14–12	7–7	7th	
1971–72	Bob King	15–11	7–7	T–4th	
Bob King:		175–89 (.663)	58–54 (.518)		
Norm Ellenberger (Western Athletic Conference) (1972–1979)
1972–73	Norm Ellenberger	21–6	9–5	T–2nd	NIT First Round
1973–74	Norm Ellenberger	22–7	10–4	1st	NCAA Division I Sweet Sixteen
1974–75	Norm Ellenberger	13–13	4–10	7th	
1975–76	Norm Ellenberger	16–11	8–6	4th	
1976–77	Norm Ellenberger	19–11	8–6	T–3rd	
1977–78	Norm Ellenberger	24–4	13–1	1st	NCAA Division I Second Round
1978–79	Norm Ellenberger	19–10	8–4	3rd	NIT First Round
Norm Ellenberger:		134–62 (.684)	60–36 (.625)		
Charlie Harrison (Western Athletic Conference) (1979–1980)
1979–80	Charlie Harrison	6–22	3–11	T–7th	
Charlie Harrison:		6–22 (.214)	3–11 (.214)		
Gary Colson (Western Athletic Conference) (1980–1988)
1980–81	Gary Colson	11–15	6–10	7th	
1981–82	Gary Colson	14–14	7–9	6th	
1982–83	Gary Colson	14–15	6–10	T-7th	
1983–84	Gary Colson	24–11	10–6	3rd	NIT First Round
1984–85	Gary Colson	19–13	9–7	T–3rd	NIT Second Round
1985–86	Gary Colson	17–14	8–8	5th	NIT First Round
1986–87	Gary Colson	25–10	11–5	T–3rd	NIT First Round
1987–88	Gary Colson	22–14	8–8	T–5th	NIT Quarterfinal
Gary Colson:		146–106 (.579)	65–63 (.508)		
Dave Bliss (Western Athletic Conference) (1988–1999)
1988–89	Dave Bliss	22–11	11–5	T–2nd	NIT Quarterfinal
1989–90	Dave Bliss	20–14	9–7	5th	NIT Fourth Place
1990–91	Dave Bliss	20–10	10–6	3rd	NCAA Division I First Round
1991–92	Dave Bliss	20–13	11–5	3rd	NIT Quarterfinal
1992–93	Dave Bliss	24–7	13–5	3rd	NCAA Division I First Round
1993–94	Dave Bliss	23–8	14–4	1st	NCAA Division I First Round
1994–95	Dave Bliss	15–15	9–9	T–4th	
1995–96	Dave Bliss	28–5	14–4	2nd	NCAA Division I Second Round
1996–97	Dave Bliss	25–8	11–5	3rd (Mountain)	NCAA Division I Second Round
1997–98	Dave Bliss	24–8	11–3	2nd (Mountain)	NCAA Division I Second Round
1998–99	Dave Bliss	25–9	9–5	T–2nd (Pacific)	NCAA Division I Second Round
Dave Bliss:		246–108 (.695)	122–58 (.678)		
Fran Fraschilla (Mountain West Conference) (1999–2002)
1999–2000	Fran Fraschilla	18–14	9–5	3rd	NIT Second Round
2000–01	Fran Fraschilla	21–13	6–8	T–5th	NIT Quarterfinal
2001–02	Fran Fraschilla	16–14	6–8	T–6th	NIT First Round
Fran Fraschilla:		55–41 (.573)	21–21 (.500)		
Ritchie McKay (Mountain West Conference) (2002–2007)
2002–03	Ritchie McKay	10–18	4–10	7th	
2003–04	Ritchie McKay	14–14	5–9	T–5th	
2004–05	Ritchie McKay	26–7	10–4	2nd	NCAA Division I First Round
2005–06	Ritchie McKay	17–13	8–8	5th	
2006–07	Ritchie McKay	15–17	4–12	8th	
Ritchie McKay:		82–69 (.543)	31–43 (.419)		
Steve Alford (Mountain West Conference) (2007–2013)
2007–08	Steve Alford	24–9	11–5	3rd	NIT First Round
2008–09	Steve Alford	22–12	12–4	T–1st	NIT Second Round
2009–10	Steve Alford	30–5	14–2	1st	NCAA Division I Second Round
2010–11	Steve Alford	22–13	8–8	5th	NIT Second Round
2011–12	Steve Alford	28–7	10–4	T–1st	NCAA Division I Second Round
2012–13	Steve Alford	29–6	13–3	1st	NCAA Division I First Round
Steve Alford:		155–52 (.749)	68–26 (.723)		
Craig Neal (Mountain West Conference) (2013–2017)
2013–14	Craig Neal	27–7	15–3	2nd	NCAA Division I First Round
2014–15	Craig Neal	15–16	7–11	8th	
2015–16	Craig Neal	17–15	10–8	T–4th	
2016–17	Craig Neal	17–14	10–8	5th	
Craig Neal:		76–52 (.594)	42–30 (.583)		
Paul Weir (Mountain West Conference) (2017–2021)
2017–18	Paul Weir	19–15	12–6	3rd	
2018–19	Paul Weir	14–18	7–11	7th	
2019–20	Paul Weir	19–14	7–11	7th	No postseason held
2020–21	Paul Weir	6–16	2–15	11th	
Paul Weir:		58–62 (.483)	28–45 (.384)		
Richard Pitino (Mountain West Conference) (2021–present)
2021–22	Richard Pitino	13–19	5–12	10th	
2022–23	Richard Pitino	22–12	8–10	6th	NIT First Round
2023–24	Richard Pitino	26–10	10–8	6th	NCAA Division I First Round
2024–25	Richard Pitino	27–8	17–3	1st	NCAA Division I Second Round
Richard Pitino:		88–49 (.642)	40–33 (.548)		
Eric Olen (Mountain West Conference) (2025–present)
2025–26	Eric Olen	26–11	13–7	3rd	NIT Semifinals
Eric Olen:		26–11 (.703)	13–7 (.650)		
Total:		1,636–1,215 (.574)			
National champion Postseason invitational champion Conference regular season champion Conference regular season and conference tournament champion Division regular season champion Division regular season and conference tournament champion Conference tournament champion
