= 1980–81 Oregon State Beavers men's basketball team =

American college basketball season

1980–81 Oregon State Beavers men's basketball

Pac-10 champions

NCAA tournament, Second round
- Conference: Pac-10 Conference

Ranking
- Coaches: No. 2
- AP: No. 2
- Record: 26–2 (17–1 Pac-10)
- Head coach: Ralph Miller (11th season)
- MVP: Steve Johnson
- Home arena: Gill Coliseum

1980–81 Pacific-10 Conference men's basketball standings
	Conf.				Overall
Team	W		L	PCT	W		L	PCT
No. 2 Oregon State	17	–	1	.944	26	–	2	.929
No. 3 Arizona State	16	–	2	.889	24	–	4	.857
No. 10 UCLA	13	–	5	.722	20	–	7	.741
USC	9	–	9	.500	14	–	13	.519
Washington	8	–	10	.444	14	–	13	.519
Arizona	8	–	10	.444	13	–	14	.481
Oregon	6	–	12	.333	13	–	14	.481
California	5	–	13	.278	13	–	14	.481
Stanford	5	–	13	.278	9	–	18	.333
Washington State	3	–	15	.167	10	–	17	.370
Rankings from AP Poll

The 1980–81 Oregon State Beavers men's basketball team represented the Oregon State University as a member of the Pacific 10 Conference during the 1980–81 NCAA Division I men's basketball season. They were led by 11th-year head coach Ralph Miller and played their home games on campus at Gill Coliseum in Corvallis, Oregon.

After winning their first 26 games of the season, Oregon State fell to No. 5 Arizona State in the regular season finale to finish at 26–1 (17–1 Pac-10), repeating as conference champion, and were ranked second in both polls. Despite dropping the regular season finale, they did not drop in the rankings, and were seeded No. 1 in the West region of the NCAA tournament.

The Beavers received an opening round bye, and were shocked by No. 8 seed Kansas State, 50–48, at Pauley Pavilion. The Wildcats would reach the Elite Eight before falling to eventual runner-up North Carolina. Oregon State finished the season at 26–2.

== Roster ==
1980–81 Oregon State Beavers men's basketball team
Players
Coaches

Pos.	#	Name	Height	Weight	Year	Hometown
G	32	Lester Conner	6 ft 4 in (1.93 m)	180 lb (82 kg)	Jr	Oakland, California
F	52	Charlie Sitton	6 ft 8 in (2.03 m)	205 lb (93 kg)	Fr	McMinnville, Oregon
F/C	55	Steve Johnson	6 ft 10 in (2.08 m)	230 lb (104 kg)	Sr	San Bernardino, California

Head coach

- Ralph Miller

Assistant coach(es)

Legend

- (C) Team captain
- (S) Suspended
- (I) Ineligible
- (W) Walk-on
- Injured
- Current redshirt

== Schedule and results ==
Date time, TV	Rank^{#}	Opponent^{#}	Result	Record	Site city, state
Regular season
Nov 29, 1980*	No. 7	No. 18 Brigham Young	W 75–68	1–0	Gill Coliseum; Corvallis, Oregon
Dec 4, 1980	No. 6	Cal State Northridge	W 78–47	2–0	Gill Coliseum; Corvallis, Oregon
Dec 6, 1980*	No. 6	at Pepperdine	W 82–76	3–0	Firestone Fieldhouse; Malibu, California
Dec 8, 1980*	No. 5	at Portland State	W 102–58	4–0	Peter W. Stott Center; Portland, Oregon
Dec 13, 1980*	No. 5	Portland	W 92–57	5–0	Gill Coliseum; Corvallis, Oregon
Dec 26, 1980*	No. 4	vs. Northwestern	W 90–70	6–0	Memorial Coliseum; Portland, Oregon
Dec 27, 1980*	No. 4	vs. Rhode Island	W 103–55	7–0	Memorial Coliseum; Portland, Oregon
Dec 28, 1980*	No. 4	vs. Oregon	W 67–57	8–0	Memorial Coliseum; Portland, Oregon
Jan 3, 1981	No. 2	at No. 13 Arizona State	W 71–67	9–0 (1–0)	Gill Coliseum; Tempe, Arizona
Jan 5, 1981	No. 2	at Arizona	W 61–49	10–0 (2–0)	McKale Center; Tucson, Arizona
Jan 9, 1981	No. 2	Stanford	W 76–62	11–0 (3–0)	Gill Coliseum; Corvallis, Oregon
Jan 10, 1981	No. 2	California	W 80–53	12–0 (4–0)	Gill Coliseum; Corvallis, Oregon
Jan 17, 1981	No. 1	Oregon	W 82–55	13–0 (5–0)	Gill Coliseum; Corvallis, Oregon
Jan 22, 1981	No. 1	at Washington State	W 66–53	14–0 (6–0)	Friel Court; Pullman, Washington
Jan 24, 1981	No. 1	at Washington	W 97–91	15–0 (7–0)	Bank of America Arena; Seattle, Washington
Jan 29, 1981	No. 1	No. 10 UCLA	W 81–67	16–0 (8–0)	Gill Coliseum; Corvallis, Oregon
Jan 31, 1981	No. 1	Southern California	W 55–48	17–0 (9–0)	Gill Coliseum; Corvallis, Oregon
Feb 6, 1981	No. 2	at California	W 69–54	18–0 (10–0)	Harmon Gym; Berkeley, California
Feb 7, 1981	No. 2	at Stanford	W 62–57	19–0 (11–0)	Maples Pavilion; Stanford, California
Feb 12, 1981	No. 2	at Oregon	W 78–61	20–0 (12–0)	McArthur Court; Eugene, Oregon
Feb 14, 1981*	No. 2	at St. John's	W 57–45	21–0	Nassau Coliseum; New York, New York
Feb 21, 1981	No. 2	Washington State	W 81–53	22–0 (13–0)	Gill Coliseum; Corvallis, Oregon
Feb 23, 1981	No. 2	Washington	W 89–63	23–0 (14–0)	Gill Coliseum; Corvallis, Oregon
Feb 27, 1981	No. 2	at USC	W 73–64	24–0 (15–0)	L.A. Sports Arena; Los Angeles, California
Mar 1, 1981	No. 2	at No. 13 UCLA	W 82–76	25–0 (16–0)	Pauley Pavilion; Los Angeles, California
Mar 5, 1981	No. 2	Arizona	W 80–62	26–0 (17–0)	Gill Coliseum; Corvallis, Oregon
Mar 7, 1981*	No. 2	No. 5 Arizona State	L 67–87	26–1 (17–1)	Gill Coliseum; Corvallis, Oregon
NCAA Tournament
Mar 14, 1981*	(1 W) No. 2	vs. (8 W) Kansas State; Second round	L 48–50	26–2	Pauley Pavilion; Los Angeles, California
*Non-conference game. ^{#}Rankings from AP Poll. (#) Tournament seedings in parentheses. W=West. All times are in Pacific.

== Awards and honors ==
- Steve Johnson – Consensus First-team All-American, Pac-10 Player of the Year

== NBA draft ==
Round	Pick	Player	NBA club
1	7	Steve Johnson	Kansas City Kings
