= 1980–81 UCLA Bruins men's basketball team =

American college basketball season

1980–81 UCLA Bruins men's basketball

NCAA tournament, First Round
- Conference: Pacific-10

Ranking
- Coaches: No. 11
- AP: No. 10
- Record: 20–7 (13–5, 3rd Pac-10)
- Head coach: Larry Brown (2nd season)
- Assistant coaches: Larry Farmer; Keith Glass; Kevin O’ Connor
- Home arena: Pauley Pavilion

1980–81 Pacific-10 Conference men's basketball standings
	Conf.				Overall
Team	W		L	PCT	W		L	PCT
No. 2 Oregon State	17	–	1	.944	26	–	2	.929
No. 3 Arizona State	16	–	2	.889	24	–	4	.857
No. 10 UCLA	13	–	5	.722	20	–	7	.741
USC	9	–	9	.500	14	–	13	.519
Washington	8	–	10	.444	14	–	13	.519
Arizona	8	–	10	.444	13	–	14	.481
Oregon	6	–	12	.333	13	–	14	.481
California	5	–	13	.278	13	–	14	.481
Stanford	5	–	13	.278	9	–	18	.333
Washington State	3	–	15	.167	10	–	17	.370
Rankings from AP Poll

The 1980–81 UCLA Bruins men's basketball team represented the University of California, Los Angeles in the 1980–81 NCAA Division I men's basketball season. Larry Brown was the head coach, and the Bruins started the season ranked 6th in the nation (AP Poll). The Bruins started the season 6–0 and were ranked a season high #3 in the A.P. Poll. The Bruins then lost at #1 ranked DePaul 93–77 on December 27. UCLA's team finished 3rd in the Pac-10 regular season. UCLA participated the NCAA Tournament but were upset by BYU in the first round, finishing 10th in the AP poll. Larry Brown coached his second and final year at UCLA.

== Starting lineup ==
Position	Player	Class
F	Mike Sanders	Jr.
F	Darren Daye	So.
C	Kenny Fields	Fr.
G	Michael Holton	So.
G	Rod Foster	So.

== Roster ==
1980–81 UCLA Bruins men's basketball team
Players
Coaches

Pos.	#	Name	Height	Weight	Year	Hometown
F	45	Tony Anderson (C)	6 ft 4 in (1.93 m)	—	Jr
F	30	Darren Daye	6 ft 7 in (2.01 m)	—	So	Des Moines, Iowa
C	35	Mark Eaton	7 ft 2 in (2.18 m)	—	Jr	Inglewood, California
C	54	Kenny Fields	6 ft 7 in (2.01 m)	—	Fr	Iowa City, Iowa
G	10	Rod Foster	6 ft 1 in (1.85 m)	—	So	Birmingham, Alabama
G	14	Michael Holton	6 ft 3 in (1.91 m)	—	So	Seattle, Washington
G	3	Ralph Jackson	6 ft 2 in (1.88 m)	—	Fr
F	11	Curtis Knight	6 ft 4 in (1.93 m)	—	So
F	34	Cliff Pruitt	6 ft 7 in (2.01 m)	—	So
F	52	Mike Sanders (C)	6 ft 6 in (1.98 m)	—	Jr	Vidalia, Louisiana
F	44	Dean Sears	6 ft 7 in (2.01 m)	—	Jr

Head coach

Larry Brown (North Carolina)

Assistant coach(es)

- Larry Farmer (UCLA)
- Keith Glass
- Kevin O'Connor

Legend

- (C) Team captain
- (S) Suspended
- (I) Ineligible
- (W) Walk-on
- Injured
- Current redshirt

Roster

== Schedule ==
Date time, TV	Rank^{#}	Opponent^{#}	Result	Record	Site city, state
Regular Season
November 28, 1980	No. 6	VMI	W 99–61	1–0	Pauley Pavilion (9,872); Los Angeles, CA
November 29, 1980	No. 6	No. 10 Notre Dame	W 94–81	2–0	Pauley Pavilion (12,321); Los Angeles, CA
December 6, 1980	No. 3	St. Mary's	W 113–70	3–0	Pauley Pavilion (10,127); Los Angeles, CA
December 13, 1980	No. 3	Pepperdine	W 81–63	4–0	Pauley Pavilion (12,273); Los Angeles, CA
December 15, 1980	No. 3	Evansville	W 69–62	5–0	Pauley Pavilion (8,637); Los Angeles, CA
December 21, 1980	No. 3	vs. Temple	W 73–49	6–0	Yoyogi National Gymnasium (5,000); Tokyo, Japan
December 27, 1980	No. 3	at No. 1 DePaul	L 77–93	6–1	Alumni Hall (16,702); Chicago, IL
January 3, 1981	No. 7	Washington	W 96–74	7–1 (1–0)	Pauley Pavilion (12,295); Los Angeles, CA
January 5, 1981	No. 7	Washington State	W 87–61	8–1 (2–0)	Pauley Pavilion (11,321); Los Angeles, CA
January 10, 1981	No. 7	USC	L 66–68	8–2 (2–1)	Pauley Pavilion (11,825); Los Angeles, CA
January 16, 1981	No. 8	at No. 12 Arizona State	L 74–78 ^{3OT}	8–3 (2–2)	ASU Activity Center (14,384); Tempe, AZ
January 17, 1981	No. 8	at Arizona	W 79–76	9–3 (3–2)	McKale Center (14,182); Tucson, AZ
January 23, 1981	No. 12	Stanford	W 85–58	10–3 (4–2)	Pauley Pavilion (12,038); Los Angeles, CA
January 24, 1981	No. 12	California	W 75–61	11–3 (5–2)	Pauley Pavilion (12,314); Los Angeles, CA
January 29, 1981	No. 10	at No. 1 Oregon State	L 67–81	11–4 (5–3)	Gill Coliseum (10,000); Corvallis, OR
January 31, 1981	No. 10	at Oregon	W 75–69	12–4 (6–3)	McArthur Court (10,000); Eugene, OR
February 6, 1981	No. 12	at USC	W 76–62	13–4 (7–3)	Los Angeles Memorial Sports Arena (13,277); Los Angeles, CA
February 8, 1981	No. 12	at No. 9 Notre Dame	W 51–50	14–4	Athletic & Convocation Center (11,345); Notre Dame, IN
February 12, 1981	No. 8	Arizona	W 90–79	15–4 (8–3)	Pauley Pavilion (11,910); Los Angeles, CA
February 14, 1981	No. 8	No. 5 Arizona State	W 64–61	16–4 (9–3)	Pauley Pavilion (12,428); Los Angeles, CA
February 19, 1981	No. 6	at California	W 72–66	17–4 (10–3)	Harmon Gym (6,700); Berkeley, CA
February 21, 1981	No. 6	at Stanford	L 72–74	17–5 (10–4)	Maples Pavilion (6,917); Stanford, CA
February 27, 1981	No. 13	Oregon	W 98–75	18–5 (11–4)	Pauley Pavilion (12,074); Los Angeles, CA
March 1, 1981	No. 13	No. 1 Oregon State	L 76–82	18–6 (11–5)	Pauley Pavilion (12,582); Los Angeles, CA
March 5, 1981	No. 13	at Washington State	W 59–50	19–6 (12–5)	Washington State University Performing Arts Coliseum (8,132); Pullman, WA
March 7, 1981	No. 13	at Washington	W 91–72	20–6 (13–5)	Hec Edmundson Pavilion (6,228); Seattle, WA
NCAA Tournament
March 14, 1981	(3 E) No. 10	vs. (6 E) No. 16 BYU; Second Round	L 55–78	20–7	Providence Civic Center (12,823); Providence, RI
*Non-conference game. ^{#}Rankings from AP Poll. (#) Tournament seedings in parentheses. All times are in Pacific Time.

== Notes ==
- Larry Brown was only at UCLA two years, but made the NCAA Tournament both times. He was 5–2 in NCAA Tournament games while at UCLA.
