= 1980–81 Nebraska Cornhuskers men's basketball team =

American college basketball season

1980–81 Nebraska Cornhuskers men's basketball
- Conference: Big Eight Conference
- Record: 15–12 (9–5 Big Eight)
- Head coach: Moe Iba (1st season)
- Home arena: Bob Devaney Sports Center

1980–81 Big Eight Conference men's basketball standings
	Conf.				Overall
Team	W		L	PCT	W		L	PCT
Missouri	10	–	4	.714	22	–	10	.688
Kansas State	9	–	5	.643	24	–	9	.727
Nebraska	9	–	5	.643	15	–	12	.556
Kansas †	9	–	5	.643	24	–	8	.750
Oklahoma State	8	–	6	.571	18	–	9	.667
Colorado	5	–	9	.357	16	–	12	.571
Oklahoma	4	–	10	.286	9	–	18	.333
Iowa State	2	–	12	.143	9	–	18	.333
† 1981 Big Eight tournament winner Rankings from AP Poll

The 1980–81 Nebraska Cornhuskers men's basketball team represented the University of Nebraska–Lincoln during the 1980–81. The Cornhuskers led by first year Head Coach Moe Iba. The team finished with a record of 15–12, 9–5.

== Schedule ==
Date time, TV	Rank^{#}	Opponent^{#}	Result	Record	Site city, state
November 28*		Wyoming	L 59–62 ^{OT}	0–1	Bob Devaney Sports Center; Lincoln, Nebraska
November 29*		Idaho	L 53–64	0–2	Bob Devaney Sports Center; Lincoln, Nebraska
December 6*		at Creighton; Rivalry	L 61–66 ^{OT}	0–3	Omaha Civic Auditorium; Omaha, Nebraska
December 9*		Penn State	W 75–50	1–3	Bob Devaney Sports Center; Lincoln, Nebraska
December 12*		vs. Loyola Marymount	W 67–66	2–3	Jon M. Huntsman Center; Salt Lake City, Utah
December 13*		at Utah	L 55–57	2–4	Jon M. Huntsman Center; Salt Lake City, Utah
December 20*		Northwest Missouri State	W 79–59	3–4	Bob Devaney Sports Center; Lincoln, Nebraska
December 22*		Colorado State	W 54–48	4–4	Bob Devaney Sports Center; Lincoln, Nebraska
December 23*		Montana	W 69–46	5–4	Bob Devaney Sports Center; Lincoln, Nebraska
December 27*		at Ball State	L 62–67	5–5	Irving Gymnasium; Muncie, Indiana
December 30*		at Arkansas	L 52–64	5–6	Barnhill Arena; Fayetteville, Arkansas
January 5*		Sonoma State	W 84–49	6–6	Bob Devaney Sports Center; Lincoln, Nebraska
January 14		Kansas State	W 59–49	7–6 (1–0)	Bob Devaney Sports Center; Lincoln, Nebraska
January 17		at Oklahoma State	L 70–81	7–7 (1–1)	Gallagher-Iba Arena; Stillwater, Oklahoma
January 21		Colorado	L 59–62	7–8 (1–2)	Bob Devaney Sports Center; Lincoln, Nebraska
January 24		Missouri	W 66–53	8–8 (2–2)	Bob Devaney Sports Center (12,579); Lincoln, Nebraska
January 28		at Iowa State	W 61–56	9–8 (3–2)	Hilton Coliseum; Ames, Iowa
January 31		No. 18 Kansas	W 57–54	10–8 (4–2)	Bob Devaney Sports Center; Lincoln, Nebraska
February 4		at Oklahoma	W 71–59	11–8 (5–2)	Lloyd Noble Center; Norman, Oklahoma
February 7		Oklahoma State	W 62–54	12–8 (6–2)	Bob Devaney Sports Center; Lincoln, Nebraska
February 11		at Colorado	W 57–56	13–8 (7–2)	CU Events Center; Boulder, Colorado
February 14		at Kansas State	L 49–66	13–9 (7–3)	Ahearn Field House; Manhattan, Kansas
February 18		Iowa State	W 81–61	14–9 (8–3)	Bob Devaney Sports Center; Lincoln, Nebraska
February 21		at Missouri	L 45–55	14–10 (8–4)	Hearnes Center (10,483); Columbia, Missouri
February 25		at Kansas	L 49–75	14–11 (8–5)	Allen Fieldhouse; Lawrence, Kansas
February 28		Oklahoma	W 90–63	15–11 (9–5)	Bob Devaney Sports Center; Lincoln, Nebraska
Big 8 Tournament
March 3		Colorado	L 66–70	15–12 (9–5)	Bob Devaney Sports Center; Lincoln, Nebraska
*Non-conference game. ^{#}Rankings from AP Poll. (#) Tournament seedings in parentheses.
