= 1980–81 Washington Huskies men's basketball team =

American college basketball season

1980–81 Washington Huskies men's basketball
- Conference: Pacific-10 Conference
- Record: 14–13 (8–10 Pac-10)
- Head coach: Marv Harshman (10th season)
- Assistant coach: Bob Johnson
- Home arena: Hec Edmundson Pavilion

1980–81 Pacific-10 Conference men's basketball standings
	Conf.				Overall
Team	W		L	PCT	W		L	PCT
No. 2 Oregon State	17	–	1	.944	26	–	2	.929
No. 3 Arizona State	16	–	2	.889	24	–	4	.857
No. 10 UCLA	13	–	5	.722	20	–	7	.741
USC	9	–	9	.500	14	–	13	.519
Washington	8	–	10	.444	14	–	13	.519
Arizona	8	–	10	.444	13	–	14	.481
Oregon	6	–	12	.333	13	–	14	.481
California	5	–	13	.278	13	–	14	.481
Stanford	5	–	13	.278	9	–	18	.333
Washington State	3	–	15	.167	10	–	17	.370
Rankings from AP Poll

The 1980–81 Washington Huskies men's basketball team represented the University of Washington for the 1980–81 NCAA Division I men's basketball season. Led by tenth-year head coach Marv Harshman, the Huskies were members of the Pacific-10 Conference and played their home games on campus at Hec Edmundson Pavilion in Seattle, Washington.

The Huskies were 14–13 overall in the regular season and 8–10 in conference play, tied for fifth in the standings. There was no conference tournament yet; it debuted six years later.
