= 1983–84 Memphis State Tigers men's basketball team =

American college basketball season

1983–84 Memphis State Tigers men's basketball

Metro Conference tournament champions Metro Conference regular season champions

NCAA tournament, Sweet Sixteen (vacated)
- Conference: Metro Conference (1975–1995)

Ranking
- Coaches: No. 16 т
- AP: No. 16
- Record: 24-6 (26–7 unadjusted) (11–3 Metro)
- Head coach: Dana Kirk (5th season)
- Assistant coaches: Larry Finch (4th season); Lee Fowler
- Home arena: Mid-South Coliseum

1983–84 Metro Conference men's basketball standings
	Conf.				Overall
Team	W		L	PCT	W		L	PCT
No. 16 Memphis State †	11	–	3	.786	26	–	7	.788
Louisville	11	–	3	.786	24	–	11	.686
Florida State	9	–	5	.643	20	–	11	.645
Virginia Tech	8	–	6	.571	22	–	13	.629
Tulane	7	–	7	.500	17	–	11	.607
South Carolina	5	–	9	.357	12	–	16	.429
Southern Miss	4	–	10	.286	13	–	15	.464
Cincinnati	0	–	14	.000	3	–	25	.107
† 1984 Metro Conference tournament winner Rankings from AP Poll

The 1983–84 Memphis State Tigers men's basketball team represented Memphis State University as a member of the Metro Conference during the 1983–84 NCAA Division I men's basketball season.

The Tigers won Metro Conference regular season and conference tournament titles to receive an automatic bid to the 1984 NCAA tournament. As No. 6 seed in the Midwest region, Memphis State beat Oral Roberts and upset No. 3 seed Purdue to reach the Sweet Sixteen for the third season in a row. The Houston Cougars, who would eventually participate in their third consecutive Final Four with their second straight runner-up finish, defeated Memphis State, 78–71. The Tigers finished with a 26–7 record (11–3 Metro), though the NCAA tournament results would later be vacated.

== Roster ==
1983–84 Memphis State Tigers men's basketball team
Players
Coaches

Pos.	#	Name	Height	Weight	Year	Hometown
G	10	Andre Turner	5 ft 10 in (1.78 m)	165 lb (75 kg)	So	Memphis, Tennessee
G	11	Ricky McCoy	6 ft 2 in (1.88 m)	180 lb (82 kg)	Jr	Memphis, Tennessee
G	20	John Wilfong	6 ft 2 in (1.88 m)	170 lb (77 kg)	Fr	Memphis, Tennessee
F	22	Bobby Parks	6 ft 5 in (1.96 m)	185 lb (84 kg)	Sr	Grand Junction, Tennessee
F	24	Keith Lee	6 ft 10 in (2.08 m)	220 lb (100 kg)	Jr	West Memphis, Arkansas
G	32	Phillip Haynes	6 ft 3 in (1.91 m)	185 lb (84 kg)	Sr	Memphis, Tennessee
F	43	Baskerville Holmes	6 ft 7 in (2.01 m)	190 lb (86 kg)	So	Memphis, Tennessee
F	45	Willie Becton	6 ft 5 in (1.96 m)	215 lb (98 kg)	Jr	Memphis, Tennessee
C	50	William Bedford	7 ft 0 in (2.13 m)	220 lb (100 kg)	Fr	Memphis, Tennessee

Head coach

- Dana Kirk

Assistant coach(es)

- Larry Finch (Memphis)
- Lee Fowler (Vanderbilt)

Legend

- (C) Team captain
- (S) Suspended
- (I) Ineligible
- (W) Walk-on
- Injured
- Current redshirt

Roster

== Schedule and results ==
Date time, TV	Rank^{#}	Opponent^{#}	Result	Record	Site city, state
Regular season
Nov 25, 1983*	No. 5	Tennessee State	W 88–60	1–0	Mid-South Coliseum; Memphis, Tennessee
Nov 26, 1983*	No. 5	North Texas	W 101–79	2–0	Mid-South Coliseum; Memphis, Tennessee
Mar 3, 1984*	No. 14	at Louisville	L 58–68	21–6	Freedom Hall; Louisville, Kentucky
Metro Conference tournament
Mar 8, 1984*	No. 17	Southern Miss; Quarterfinals	W 86–58	22–6	Mid-South Coliseum; Memphis, Tennessee
Mar 9, 1984*	No. 17	Florida State; Semifinals	W 65–63	23–6	Mid-South Coliseum; Memphis, Tennessee
Mar 10, 1984*	No. 17	Virginia Tech; Championship Game	W 78–65	24–6	Mid-South Coliseum; Memphis, Tennessee
NCAA Tournament
Mar 15, 1984*	(6 MW) No. 16	vs. (11 MW) Oral Roberts; First round	W 92–83	25–6	Mid-South Coliseum; Memphis, Tennessee
Mar 17, 1984*	(6 MW) No. 16	vs. (3 MW) No. 10 Purdue; Second Round	W 66–48	26–6	Mid-South Coliseum; Memphis, Tennessee
Mar 23, 1984*	(6 MW) No. 16	vs. (2 MW) No. 5 Houston; Midwest Regional semifinal – Sweet Sixteen	L 71–78	26–7	St. Louis Arena; St. Louis, Missouri
*Non-conference game. ^{#}Rankings from AP Poll. (#) Tournament seedings in parentheses. MW=Midwest region. All times are in Eastern Time.

== Rankings ==
Ranking movements Legend: ██ Increase in ranking ██ Decrease in ranking — = Not ranked т = Tied with team above or below
	Week																
Poll	Pre	1	2	3	4	5	6	7	8	9	10	11	12	13	14	15	Final
AP	5	4	4	7	16	17	19	19	18	13	9	9	8	12	14	17	16
Coaches	Not released		4	8	17	11 т	19	—	—	15	11	9	9	13	14	20	16 т
