= 1980–81 Kansas Jayhawks men's basketball team =

American college basketball season

1980–81 Kansas Jayhawks men's basketball

Big Eight Conference men's basketball tournament champions

NCAA tournament, Sweet Sixteen
- Conference: Big Eight Conference

Ranking
- Coaches: No. 19
- Record: 24–8 (9–5 Big 8)
- Head coach: Ted Owens (17th season)
- Assistant coaches: Bob Hill (2nd season); Murray Knox (1st season); Lafayette Norwood (3rd season)
- Captains: Tony Guy; Darnell Valentine
- Home arena: Allen Fieldhouse

1980–81 Big Eight Conference men's basketball standings
| | Conf. | | | | Overall |
| Team | W | | L | PCT | W | | L | PCT |
|---|---|---|---|---|---|---|---|---|
| Missouri | 10 | – | 4 | .714 | 22 | – | 10 | .688 |
| Kansas State | 9 | – | 5 | .643 | 24 | – | 9 | .727 |
| Nebraska | 9 | – | 5 | .643 | 15 | – | 12 | .556 |
| Kansas † | 9 | – | 5 | .643 | 24 | – | 8 | .750 |
| Oklahoma State | 8 | – | 6 | .571 | 18 | – | 9 | .667 |
| Colorado | 5 | – | 9 | .357 | 16 | – | 12 | .571 |
| Oklahoma | 4 | – | 10 | .286 | 9 | – | 18 | .333 |
| Iowa State | 2 | – | 12 | .143 | 9 | – | 18 | .333 |
† 1981 Big Eight tournament winner Rankings from AP Poll

The 1980–81 Kansas Jayhawks men's basketball team represented the University of Kansas during the 1980–81 NCAA Division I men's basketball season.

== Roster ==
1980–81 Kansas Jayhawks men's basketball team
Players
Coaches

| Pos. | # | Name | Height | Weight | Year | Hometown |
|---|---|---|---|---|---|---|
| F | 40 | John Crawford | 6 ft 7 in (2.01 m) | 178 lb (81 kg) | Sr | Kansas City, Missouri |
| G | 34 | Tony Guy | 6 ft 6 in (1.98 m) | 195 lb (88 kg) | Jr | Towson, Maryland |
| C | 54 | Art Housey | 6 ft 10 in (2.08 m) | 214 lb (97 kg) | Sr | Bronx, New York |
| C | 24 | Kelly Knight | 6 ft 7 in (2.01 m) | 231 lb (105 kg) | So | Wichita, Kansas |
| F | 35 | Dave Magley | 6 ft 7 in (2.01 m) | 208 lb (94 kg) | Jr | South Bend, Indiana |
| C | 55 | Victor Mitchell | 6 ft 9 in (2.06 m) | 250 lb (113 kg) | Jr | Amarillo, Texas |
| G | 31 | Booty Neal | 6 ft 5 in (1.96 m) | 150 lb (68 kg) | Sr | Oxon Hill, Maryland |
| G | 15 | Rickey Ross | 6 ft 6 in (1.98 m) | 167 lb (76 kg) | So | Wichita, Kansas |
| G | 14 | Darnell Valentine | 6 ft 2 in (1.88 m) | 183 lb (83 kg) | Sr | Wichita, Kansas |
| G | 22 | Mark Welch | 6 ft 1 in (1.85 m) | 175 lb (79 kg) | So | Gardner, Kansas |
| G | 33 | Rick Worrell | 6 ft 6 in (1.98 m) | 175 lb (79 kg) | So | Salina, Kansas |

Head coach

- Ted Owens

Assistant coach(es)

Legend

- (C) Team captain
- (S) Suspended
- (I) Ineligible
- (W) Walk-on
- Injured
- Current redshirt

== Schedule ==
| Date time, TV | Rank^{#} | Opponent^{#} | Result | Record | Site city, state |
|---|---|---|---|---|---|
| November 29* | | at Nevada | W 91-73 | 1-0 | Centennial Coliseum; Reno, NV |
| December 1* | | Pepperdine | W 81-67 | 2-0 | Allen Fieldhouse; Lawrence, KS |
| December 3* | | Michigan | L 52-64 | 2-1 | Allen Fieldhouse; Lawrence, KS |
| December 6* | | Oral Roberts | W 90-66 | 3-1 | Allen Fieldhouse; Lawrence, KS |
| December 9* | | Morehead State | W 90-56 | 4-1 | Allen Fieldhouse; Lawrence, KS |
| December 13* | | at No. 2 Kentucky | L 73-87 | 4-2 | Rupp Arena; Lexington, KY |
| December 20* | | USC | W 91-68 | 5-2 | Allen Fieldhouse; Lawrence, KS |
| December 22* | | at SMU | W 73-62 | 6-2 | Moody Coliseum; University Park, TX |
| December 30* | | Rollins | W 102-47 | 7-2 | Allen Fieldhouse; Lawrence, KS |
| January 3* | | No. 6 North Carolina | W 56-55 | 8-2 | Kemper Arena; Kansas City, MO |
| January 6* | | at Memphis | W 59-49 | 9-2 | Mid-South Coliseum; Memphis, TN |
| January 10 | | Iona | W 94-64 | 10-2 | Allen Fieldhouse; Lawrence, KS |
| January 14 | | Iowa State | W 70-58 | 11-2 (1-0) | Allen Fieldhouse; Lawrence, KS |
| January 17 | | at Oklahoma | W 82-78 | 12-2 (2-0) | Lloyd Noble Center; Norman, OK |
| January 21 | | No. 18 Missouri; Border War | W 63-55 | 13-2 (3-0) | Allen Fieldhouse (16,000); Lawrence, KS |
| January 24* | | Colorado | W 66-59 | 14-2 (4-0) | Allen Fieldhouse; Lawrence, KS |
| January 28 | No. 18 | at Kansas State; Sunflower Showdown | L 43-54 | 14-3 (4-1) | Ahearn Field House; Manhattan, KS |
| January 31 | No. 18 | at Nebraska | L 54-57 | 14-4 (4-2) | Bob Devaney Sports Center; Lincoln, NE |
| February 4 | | at Oklahoma State | L 73-76 | 14-5 (4-3) | Gallagher-Iba Arena; Stillwater, OK |
| February 7 | | Oklahoma | W 96-67 | 15-5 (5-3) | Allen Fieldhouse; Lawrence, KS |
| February 9 | | at Missouri; Border War | L 65-79 | 15-6 (5-4) | Hearnes Center (11,148); Columbia, MO |
| February 14 | | at Iowa State | W 51-49 | 16-6 (6-4) | James H. Hilton Coliseum; Ames, IA |
| February 18 | | Kansas State; Sunflower Showdown | W 51-49 | 17-6 (7-4) | Allen Fieldhouse; Lawrence, KS |
| February 21 | | at Colorado | L 50-53 | 17-7 (7-5) | Coors Events/Conference Center; Boulder, CO |
| February 25 | | Nebraska | W 75-49 | 18-7 (8-5) | Allen Fieldhouse; Lawrence, KS |
| February 28 | | Oklahoma State | W 80-65 | 19-7 (9-5) | Allen Fieldhouse; Lawrence, KS |
| March 3 | (4) | (5) Oklahoma State; Big Eight Tournament quarterfinals | W 96-69 | 20-7 | Allen Fieldhouse; Lawrence, KS |
| March 4 | (4) | vs. (1) Missouri; Big Eight tournament semifinals Border War | W 75-70 | 21-7 | Kemper Arena (17,032); Kansas City, MO |
| March 5 | (4) | vs. (2) Kansas State; Big Eight tournament championship Game; Sunflower Showdown | W 80-68 | 22-7 | Kemper Arena; Kansas City, MO |
| March 13* | (7 MW) | vs. (10 MW) Ole Miss; NCAA Tournament first round | W 69-66 | 23-7 | Levitt Arena; Wichita, KS |
| March 15* | (7 MW) | vs. (2 MW) No. 3 Arizona State; NCAA Tournament second round | W 88-71 | 24-7 | Levitt Arena; Wichita, KS |
| March 20* | (7 MW) | vs. (6 MW) Wichita State; NCAA Tournament Sweet Sixteen | L 65-66 | 24-8 | Louisiana Superdome; New Orleans, LA |
*Non-conference game. ^{#}Rankings from AP Poll. (#) Tournament seedings in parentheses. Midwest=MW.
