= 1983–84 Louisville Cardinals men's basketball team =

American college basketball season

1983–84 Louisville Cardinals men's basketball

Metro Conference Champions

NCAA men's Division I tournament, Sweet Sixteen
- Conference: Metro Conference (1975–1995)
- Record: 24–11 (11–3 Metro)
- Head coach: Denny Crum (13th season)
- Home arena: Freedom Hall

1983–84 Metro Conference men's basketball standings
	Conf.				Overall
Team	W		L	PCT	W		L	PCT
No. 16 Memphis State †	11	–	3	.786	26	–	7	.788
Louisville	11	–	3	.786	24	–	11	.686
Florida State	9	–	5	.643	20	–	11	.645
Virginia Tech	8	–	6	.571	22	–	13	.629
Tulane	7	–	7	.500	17	–	11	.607
South Carolina	5	–	9	.357	12	–	16	.429
Southern Miss	4	–	10	.286	13	–	15	.464
Cincinnati	0	–	14	.000	3	–	25	.107
† 1984 Metro Conference tournament winner Rankings from AP Poll

The 1983–84 Louisville Cardinals men's basketball team represented the University of Louisville during the 1983–84 NCAA Division I men's basketball season, Louisville's 71st season of intercollegiate competition. The Cardinals competed in the Metro Conference and were coached by Denny Crum, who was in his thirteenth season. The team played its home games at Freedom Hall.

The Cardinals won the Metro Conference regular season (their 6th). They earned a 5 seed in the NCAA Midwest Regional where they lost to Kentucky 72–71 in the Sweet Sixteen. The Cardinals finished with a 24–11 (11–3) record.

== NCAA tournament ==
=== Mideast region ===
First round
8	BYU	84
9	UAB	68
5	Louisville	72
12	Morehead State	59
6	Oregon State	62
11	West Virginia	64
7	Villanova	84
10	Marshall	72

Second round
8	BYU	68
1	Kentucky	93
4	Tulsa	67
5	Louisville	69
11	West Virginia	77
3	Maryland	102
2	Illinois	64
7	Villanova	56

Regional semifinals
1	Kentucky	72
5	Louisville	67
3	Maryland	70
2	Illinois	72

Regional finals
1	Kentucky	54
2	Illinois	51
