= 1981 Big Eight Conference men's basketball tournament =

- Classification: Division I
- Season: 1980–81
- Teams: 8
- First round site: Campus Sites; Campus Arenas
- Finals site: Kemper Arena; Kansas City, MO
- Champions: Kansas (1st title)
- Winning coach: Ted Owens (1st title)
- MVP: Darnell Valentine (Kansas)

1980–81 Big Eight Conference men's basketball standings
	Conf.				Overall
Team	W		L	PCT	W		L	PCT
Missouri	10	–	4	.714	22	–	10	.688
Kansas State	9	–	5	.643	24	–	9	.727
Nebraska	9	–	5	.643	15	–	12	.556
Kansas †	9	–	5	.643	24	–	8	.750
Oklahoma State	8	–	6	.571	18	–	9	.667
Colorado	5	–	9	.357	16	–	12	.571
Oklahoma	4	–	10	.286	9	–	18	.333
Iowa State	2	–	12	.143	9	–	18	.333
† 1981 Big Eight tournament winner Rankings from AP Poll

The 1981 Big Eight Conference men's basketball tournament was held March 3–5 at a combination of on-campus gymnasiums and Kemper Arena in Kansas City, Missouri.

In a rematch of the 1980 final (won by KSU), Kansas upset rivals Kansas State in the championship game, 80–68, to win their first Big Eight men's basketball tournament.

The Jayhawks, in turn, received an automatic bid to the 1981 NCAA tournament. They were joined in the tournament by fellow Big Eight members Missouri and Kansas State, who earned at-large bids.

== Format ==
All eight of the conference's members participated in the tournament field. They were seeded based on regular season conference records, with all teams placed and paired in the initial quarterfinal round.

All first-round games were played on the home court of the higher-seeded team. The semifinals and championship game, in turn, were played at a neutral site at Kemper Arena in Kansas City, Missouri.

== Bracket ==
Quarterfinals; Tuesday, March 3
1	Missouri	95
8	Iowa State	70
5	Oklahoma State	69
4	Kansas	96
3	Nebraska	66
6	Colorado	70
7	Oklahoma	56
2	Kansas State	75

Semifinals; Wednesday, March 4
1	Missouri	70
4	Kansas	75
6	Colorado	61
2	Kansas State	64

Championship; Thursday, March 5
4	Kansas	80
2	Kansas State	68
