= 1980–81 Missouri Tigers men's basketball team =

American college basketball season

1980–81 Missouri Tigers men's basketball

Big Eight Regular Season Champions

NCAA tournament, Second Round
- Conference: Big Eight Conference
- Record: 22–10 (10–4 Big 8)
- Head coach: Norm Stewart (14th season)
- Assistant coach: Gary Garner (4th season)
- Home arena: Hearnes Center

1980–81 Big Eight Conference men's basketball standings
| | Conf. | | | | Overall |
| Team | W | | L | PCT | W | | L | PCT |
|---|---|---|---|---|---|---|---|---|
| Missouri | 10 | – | 4 | .714 | 22 | – | 10 | .688 |
| Kansas State | 9 | – | 5 | .643 | 24 | – | 9 | .727 |
| Nebraska | 9 | – | 5 | .643 | 15 | – | 12 | .556 |
| Kansas † | 9 | – | 5 | .643 | 24 | – | 8 | .750 |
| Oklahoma State | 8 | – | 6 | .571 | 18 | – | 9 | .667 |
| Colorado | 5 | – | 9 | .357 | 16 | – | 12 | .571 |
| Oklahoma | 4 | – | 10 | .286 | 9 | – | 18 | .333 |
| Iowa State | 2 | – | 12 | .143 | 9 | – | 18 | .333 |
† 1981 Big Eight tournament winner Rankings from AP Poll

The 1980–81 Missouri Tigers men's basketball team represented the University of Missouri as a member of the Big Eight Conference during the 1980–81 NCAA men's basketball season. Led by head coach Norm Stewart, the Tigers won the Big Eight regular season title, reached the NCAA tournament, and finished with an overall record of 22–10 (10–4 Big Eight).

== Roster ==
- Ricky Frazier, So.
- Steve Stipanovich, So.
- Jon Sundvold, So.
- Head coach: Norm Stewart

== Schedule and results ==
| Date time, TV | Rank^{#} | Opponent^{#} | Result | Record | Site (attendance) city, state |
Regular season
| Nov 28, 1980* | No. 11 | vs. No. 20 Arkansas; Great Alaskan Shootout | L 73–81 | 0–1 | Buckner Fieldhouse (3,000); Anchorage, AK |
| Nov 29, 1980* | No. 11 | vs. Colgate; Great Alaskan Shootout | W 73–67 | 1–1 | Buckner Fieldhouse (3,000); Anchorage, AK |
| Nov 30, 1980* | No. 11 | vs. Alaska Anchorage; Great Alaskan Shootout | W 54–53 | 2–1 | Buckner Fieldhouse (2,500); Anchorage, AK |
| Dec 5, 1980* | No. 17 | West Texas A&M; Showme Classic | W 88–70 | 3–1 | Hearnes Center (9,833); Columbia, MO |
| Dec 6, 1980* | No. 17 | Lamar; Showme Classic | W 92–70 | 4–1 | Hearnes Center (10,048); Columbia, MO |
| Dec 10, 1980* | No. 14 | vs. Illinois; Braggin' Rights | L 62–84 | 4–2 | St. Louis Arena (14,370); St. Louis, MO |
| Dec 13, 1980* | No. 14 | Saint Louis | W 76–58 | 5–2 | Hearnes Center (9,012); Columbia, MO |
| Dec 16, 1980* | | U.S. International | W 93–44 | 6–2 | Hearnes Center (5,873); Columbia, MO |
| Dec 19, 1980* | | vs. Florida State | L 64–68 | 6–3 | Omni Coliseum (4,200); Atlanta, GA |
| Dec 20, 1980* | | vs. Chattanooga | W 64–62 | 7–3 | Omni Coliseum (4,075); Atlanta, GA |
| Dec 22, 1980* | | Brown | W 83–61 | 8–3 | Hearnes Center (5,786); Columbia, MO |
| Jan 3, 1981* | | at Oral Roberts | W 83–74 | 9–3 | Mabee Center (7,437); Tulsa, OK |
| Jan 5, 1981* | | Navy | W 88–67 | 10–3 | Hearnes Center (6,503); Columbia, MO |
| Jan 7, 1981* | | at La Salle | W 83–73 | 11–3 | Kemper Arena (4,200); Kansas City, MO |
| Jan 13, 1981 | | Oklahoma | W 81–52 | 12–3 (1–0) | Hearnes Center (9,361); Columbia, MO |
| Jan 17, 1981; 1:30 p.m. | | Iowa State | W 92–69 | 13–3 (2–0) | Hearnes Center (11,112); Columbia, MO |
| Jan 18, 1981* | | at Louisville | L 49–71 | 13–4 | Freedom Hall (13,386); Louisville, KY |
| Jan 21, 1981 | No. 18 | at Kansas; Border War | L 55–63 | 13–5 (2–1) | Allen Fieldhouse (16,000); Lawrence, KS |
| Jan 24, 1981 | | at Nebraska | L 53–66 | 13–6 (2–2) | Bob Devaney Sports Center (12,579); Lincoln, NE |
| Jan 28, 1981 | | Oklahoma State | W 92–77 | 14–6 (3–2) | Hearnes Center (9,483); Columbia, MO |
| Jan 31, 1981 | | Colorado | W 66–58 | 15–6 (4–2) | Hearnes Center (9,158); Columbia, MO |
| Feb 4, 1981 | | at Kansas State | L 56–75 | 15–7 (4–3) | Ahearn Field House (11,290); Manhattan, KS |
| Feb 7, 1981; 2:38 p.m. | | at Iowa State | W 70–56 | 16–7 (5–3) | Hilton Coliseum (10,018); Ames, IA |
| Feb 9, 1981 | | Kansas | W 79–65 | 17–7 (6–3) | Hearnes Center (11,148); Columbia, MO |
| Feb 14, 1981 | | Oklahoma | L 55–60 | 17–8 (6–4) | Lloyd Noble Center (11,148); Norman, OK |
| Feb 18, 1981 | | at Oklahoma State | W 82–65 | 18–8 (7–4) | Gallagher-Iba Arena (6,500); Stillwater, OK |
| Feb 21, 1981 | | Nebraska | W 55–45 | 19–8 (8–4) | Hearnes Center (10,483); Columbia, MO |
| Feb 25, 1981 | | at Colorado | W 73–62 | 20–8 (9–4) | CU Events Center (6,058); Boulder, CO |
| Feb 28, 1981 | | Kansas State | W 46–43 | 21–8 (10–4) | Hearnes Center (12,906); Columbia, MO |
Big Eight Conference tournament
| Mar 3, 1981*; 8:05 p.m. | (1) | (8) Iowa State; Big Eight tournament Quarterfinal | W 95–70 | 22–8 | Hearnes Center (7,303); Columbia, MO |
| Mar 4, 1981* | (1) | vs. (4) Kansas; Big Eight tournament Semifinal | L 70–75 | 22–9 | Kemper Arena (17,032); Kansas City, MO |
NCAA tournament
| Mar 12, 1981* | (9 MW) | vs. (8 MW) Lamar; First Round | L 67–71 | 22–10 | Frank Erwin Center (6,475); Austin, TX |
*Non-conference game. ^{#}Rankings from AP Poll. (#) Tournament seedings in parentheses. MW=Midwest. All times are in Central.
