= 1980–81 Tulane Green Wave men's basketball team =

American college basketball season

1980–81 Tulane Green Wave men's basketball
- Conference: Metro Conference (1975–1995)
- Record: 12–15 (4–8 Metro)
- Head coach: Roy Danforth (5th season)
- Home arena: Devlin Fieldhouse

1980–81 Metro Conference men's basketball standings
	Conf.				Overall
Team	W		L	PCT	W		L	PCT
No. 12 Louisville †	11	–	1	.917	21	–	9	.700
Florida State	7	–	5	.583	17	–	11	.607
Cincinnati	6	–	6	.500	16	–	13	.552
Virginia Tech	6	–	6	.500	15	–	13	.536
Memphis State	5	–	7	.417	13	–	14	.481
Tulane	4	–	8	.333	12	–	15	.444
Saint Louis	3	–	9	.250	9	–	18	.333
† 1981 Metro Conference tournament winner Rankings from AP Poll

The 1980–81 Tulane Green Wave men's basketball team represented Tulane University during the 1980–81 NCAA Division I men's basketball season. The Green Wave were led by head coach Roy Danforth, as members of the Metro Conference.

== Roster ==
1980–81 Tulane Green Wave men's basketball team
Players
Coaches

Pos.	#	Name	Height	Weight	Year	Hometown
F	32	Craig Beard	6 ft 6 in (1.98 m)	205 lb (93 kg)	Fr	Birmingham, Alabama
F	50	Micah Blunt	6 ft 9 in (2.06 m)	195 lb (88 kg)	Jr	Metairie, Louisiana
C	50	Steve Carpenter	7 ft 0 in (2.13 m)	220 lb (100 kg)	So	Knoxville, Tennessee
F	45	Robert Coleman	6 ft 7 in (2.01 m)	210 lb (95 kg)	Fr	Central Square, New York
G	24	Gary Delph	6 ft 2 in (1.88 m)	175 lb (79 kg)	Fr	Anderson, Indiana
F	44	Eric Dozier	6 ft 7 in (2.01 m)	200 lb (91 kg)	Sr	Washington, D. C.
G	14	Reggie Duke	6 ft 2 in (1.88 m)	165 lb (75 kg)	Jr	Pittsburgh, Pennsylvania
G	42	Jimmy Elliott	6 ft 2 in (1.88 m)	175 lb (79 kg)	Fr	Knoxville, Tennessee
G	12	Craig Harris	5 ft 9 in (1.75 m)	150 lb (68 kg)	Sr	Alexandria, Virginia
G	15	Joe Holston	6 ft 4 in (1.93 m)	175 lb (79 kg)	Jr	Washington, D. C.
F	22	Jim Hurd	6 ft 4 in (1.93 m)	185 lb (84 kg)	Sr	Metairie, Louisiana
F	34	Clarence James	6 ft 6 in (1.98 m)	195 lb (88 kg)	Sr	Tampa, Florida
G	20	Reggie McLaurin	6 ft 2 in (1.88 m)	185 lb (84 kg)	Sr	Goldsboro, North Carolina
G	10	Daryl Moreau	6 ft 2 in (1.88 m)	160 lb (73 kg)	So	New Orleans, Louisiana
F	33	Paul Thompson	6 ft 6 in (1.98 m)	190 lb (86 kg)	So	Alexandria, Louisiana

Head coach

- Roy Danforth

Assistant coach(es)

Legend

- (C) Team captain
- (S) Suspended
- (I) Ineligible
- (W) Walk-on
- Injured
- Current redshirt

== Schedule ==
Date time, TV	Rank^{#}	Opponent^{#}	Result	Record	Site city, state
November 28*		vs. Oklahoma City; Mid–South Classic	W 105–87	1–0	Mid-South Coliseum; Memphis, Tennessee
November 29*		vs. Southern Illinois; Mid–South Classic	W 92–78	2–0	Mid-South Coliseum; Memphis, Tennessee
December 2*		vs. Rice	W 78–62	3–0	Rice Gymnasium; Houston, Texas
December 6*		vs. No. 15 LSU	L 81–119	3–1	LSU Assembly Center; Baton Rouge, Louisiana
December 10*		Roosevelt	W 109–63	4–1	Devlin Fieldhouse; New Orleans, Louisiana
December 12*		at Oral Roberts	L 90–96	4–2	Mabee Center; Tulsa, Oklahoma
December 13*		at Tulsa	L 85–102	4–3	Tulsa Convention Center; Tulsa, Oklahoma
December 20*		No. 10 LSU	L 72–86	4–4	Louisiana Superdome; New Orleans, Louisiana
January 5		Louisville	L 53–73	4–5 (0–1)	Louisiana Superdome; New Orleans, Louisiana
January 6*		Fredonia State	W 80–63	5–5 (0–1)	Devlin Fieldhouse; New Orleans, Louisiana
January 10		Memphis State	L 55–67	5–6 (0–2)	Louisiana Superdome; New Orleans, Louisiana
January 13*		Mercer	W 67–57	6–6 (0–2)	Devlin Fieldhouse; New Orleans, Louisiana
January 17*		New Orleans	W 77–70	7–6 (0–2)	Devlin Fieldhouse; New Orleans, Louisiana
January 19		at Memphis State	L 79–91	7–7 (0–3)	Mid-South Coliseum; Memphis, Tennessee
January 24		at Florida State	L 61–79	7–8 (0–4)	Tully Gymnasium; Tallahassee, Florida
January 27		Cincinnati	W 65–50	8–8 (1–4)	Louisiana Superdome; New Orleans, Louisiana
January 31		Florida State	L 61–79	8–9 (1–5)	Louisiana Superdome; New Orleans, Louisiana
February 2		at St. Louis	W 83–71	9–9 (2–5)	St. Louis Arena; St. Louis, Missouri
February 4		at Louisville	L 58–85	9–10 (2–6)	Freedom Hall; Louisville, Kentucky
February 7*		at Southern Miss	L 61–71	9–11 (2–6)	Reed Green Coliseum; Hattiesburg, Mississippi
February 10		at Cincinnati	L 76–91	9–12 (2–7)	Riverfront Coliseum; Cincinnati, Ohio
February 18		Virginia Tech	W 76–74	10–12 (3–7)	Devlin Fieldhouse; New Orleans, Louisiana
February 22*		at New Orleans	L 69–82	10–13 (3–7)	Human Performance Center; New Orleans, Louisiana
February 25		at Virginia Tech	L 75–96	10–14 (3–8)	Cassell Coliseum; Blacksburg, Virginia
February 27		St. Louis	W 75–69	11–14 (4–8)	Louisiana Superdome; New Orleans, Louisiana
March 2*		Southern Miss	W 84–80	12–14 (4–8)	Devlin Fieldhouse; New Orleans, Louisiana
Metro Tournament
March 6	(6)	vs. (3) Cincinnati; First round	L 66–67	12–15 (4–8)	Freedom Hall; Louisville, Kentucky
*Non-conference game. ^{#}Rankings from AP Poll. (#) Tournament seedings in parentheses. All times are in Central Time.
