= 1980–81 Kansas State Wildcats men's basketball team =

American college basketball season

1980–81 Kansas State Wildcats men's basketball

NCAA tournament, Elite Eight
- Conference: Big Eight Conference
- Record: 24–9 (9–5 Big Eight)
- Head coach: Jack Hartman (11th season)
- Assistant coach: Lon Kruger (2nd season)
- Home arena: Ahearn Field House

1980–81 Big Eight Conference men's basketball standings
	Conf.				Overall
Team	W		L	PCT	W		L	PCT
Missouri	10	–	4	.714	22	–	10	.688
Kansas State	9	–	5	.643	24	–	9	.727
Nebraska	9	–	5	.643	15	–	12	.556
Kansas †	9	–	5	.643	24	–	8	.750
Oklahoma State	8	–	6	.571	18	–	9	.667
Colorado	5	–	9	.357	16	–	12	.571
Oklahoma	4	–	10	.286	9	–	18	.333
Iowa State	2	–	12	.143	9	–	18	.333
† 1981 Big Eight tournament winner Rankings from AP Poll

The 1980–81 Kansas State Wildcats men's basketball team represented Kansas State University as a member of the Big Eight Conference in the 1980–81 NCAA Division I men's basketball season. The team was led by head coach Jack Hartman and played their home games at Ahearn Field House in Manhattan, Kansas. The Wildcats finished second in the conference regular season standings and received a bid to the NCAA tournament as No. 8 seed in the West region. The Wildcats beat No. 9 seed San Francisco in the opening round, then upset No. 1 seed Oregon State and No. 4 seed Illinois to reach the regional final where they lost to North Carolina in Elite Eight, 82–68. Kansas State finished with a record of 24–9 (9–5 Big Eight).

== Roster ==
1980–81 Kansas State Wildcats men's basketball team
Players
Coaches

Pos.	#	Name	Height	Weight	Year	Hometown
G	12	Tim Jankovich	6 ft 0 in (1.83 m)	165 lb (75 kg)	Jr	Manhattan, Kansas
G	25	Rolando Blackman	6 ft 6 in (1.98 m)	190 lb (86 kg)	Sr	Brooklyn, New York
F	45	Ed Nealy	6 ft 7 in (2.01 m)	238 lb (108 kg)	Jr	Bonner Springs, Kansas
F	52	Randy Reed	6 ft 7 in (2.01 m)	215 lb (98 kg)	Jr	St. Louis, Missouri

Head coach

- Jack Hartman

Assistant coach(es)

Legend

- (C) Team captain
- (S) Suspended
- (I) Ineligible
- (W) Walk-on
- Injured
- Current redshirt

Roster

== Schedule ==
Date time, TV	Rank^{#}	Opponent^{#}	Result	Record	Site city, state
Regular season
November 29*		Northern Iowa	W 72–54	1–0	Ahearn Field House; Manhattan, Kansas
December 1*		South Dakota	W 83–50	2–0	Ahearn Field House; Manhattan, Kansas
December 6*		at Arizona	W 55–53	3–0	McKale Center; Tucson, Arizona
December 8*		at No. 15 Arizona State	L 61–84	3–1	ASU Activity Center; Tempe, Arizona
December 13*		Wisconsin-Parkside	W 72–58	4–1	Ahearn Field House; Manhattan, Kansas
December 20*		US International	W 76–45	5–1	Ahearn Field House; Manhattan, Kansas
December 23*		No. 15 Indiana	L 44–51	5–2	Ahearn Field House; Manhattan, Kansas
December 27*		vs. No. 17 Arkansas	W 47–46	6–2	Kansas City, Mo
December 31*		Fresno State	W 47–39	7–2	Ahearn Field House; Manhattan, Kansas
January 3*		Louisville	W 64–47	8–2	Ahearn Field House; Manhattan, Kansas
January 6*		Oklahoma City	W 97–79	9–2	Ahearn Field House; Manhattan, Kansas
January 10*		Eastern Illinois	W 74–62	10–2	Ahearn Field House; Manhattan, Kansas
January 14		at Nebraska	L 49–59	10–3 (0–1)	Bob Devaney Sports Center; Lincoln, Nebraska
January 17		at Colorado	W 63–62	11–3 (1–1)	CU Events Center; Boulder, Colorado
January 21		Oklahoma State	L 83–90	11–4 (1–2)	Ahearn Field House; Manhattan, Kansas
January 24		at Oklahoma	L 63–65	11–5 (1–3)	Lloyd Noble Center; Norman, Oklahoma
January 28		No. 18 Kansas	W 54–43	12–5 (2–3)	Ahearn Field House; Manhattan, Kansas
January 31		at Iowa State	W 75–62	13–5 (3–3)	Hilton Coliseum (11,238); Ames, Iowa
February 4		Missouri	W 75–65	14–5 (4–3)	Ahearn Field House (11,290); Manhattan, Kansas
February 7		Colorado	W 82–62	15–5 (5–3)	Ahearn Field House; Manhattan, Kansas
February 11		at Oklahoma State	W 73–70	16–5 (6–3)	Gallagher-Iba Arena; Stillwater, Oklahoma
February 14		Nebraska	W 66–49	17–5 (7–3)	Ahearn Field House; Manhattan, Kansas
February 18		at Kansas	L 49–51	17–6 (7–4)	Allen Fieldhouse; Lawrence, Kansas
February 21		Oklahoma	W 108–71	18–6 (8–4)	Ahearn Field House; Manhattan, Kansas
February 25		Iowa State	W 67–60	19–6 (9–4)	Ahearn Field House; Manhattan, Kansas
February 28		at Missouri	L 43–46	19–7 (9–5)	Hearnes Center (12,906); Columbia, Missouri
Big 8 tournament
March 3	(2)	(7) Oklahoma; Quarterfinals	W 75–56	20–7 (9–5)	Ahearn Field House; Manhattan, Kansas
March 4	(2)	vs. (6) Colorado; Semifinals	W 64–61	21–7 (9–5)	Kemper Arena; Kansas City, Missouri
March 5	(2)	vs. (4) Kansas; Championship	L 68–80	21–8 (9–5)	Kemper Arena; Kansas City, Missouri
NCAA Tournament
March 12	(8 W)	vs. (9 W) San Francisco; First round	W 64–60	22–8 (9–5)	Pauley Pavilion; Los Angeles, California
March 14	(8 W)	vs. (1 W) No. 2 Oregon State; Second round	W 50–48	23–8 (9–5)	Pauley Pavilion; Los Angeles, California
March 19	(8 W)	vs. (4 W) No. 19 Illinois; West Regional Semifinal – Sweet Sixteen	W 57–52	24–8 (9–5)	Jon M. Huntsman Center (15,450); Salt Lake City, Utah
March 21	(8 W)	vs. (2 W) No. 6 North Carolina; West Regional Final – Elite Eight	L 68–82	24–9 (9–5)	Jon M. Huntsman Center; Salt Lake City, Utah
*Non-conference game. ^{#}Rankings from AP Poll. (#) Tournament seedings in parentheses. W=West. All times are in Central Time.

== Team players drafted into the NBA ==
Round	Pick	Player	NBA club
1	9	Rolando Blackman	Dallas Mavericks
