= 1980–81 Arizona State Sun Devils men's basketball team =

American college basketball season

1980–81 Arizona State Sun Devils men's basketball

NCAA tournament, First round
- Conference: Pac-10 Conference

Ranking
- Coaches: No. 5
- AP: No. 3
- Record: 24–4 (16–2 Pac-10)
- Head coach: Ned Wulk (24th season)
- Home arena: ASU Activity Center

1980–81 Pacific-10 Conference men's basketball standings
	Conf.				Overall
Team	W		L	PCT	W		L	PCT
No. 2 Oregon State	17	–	1	.944	26	–	2	.929
No. 3 Arizona State	16	–	2	.889	24	–	4	.857
No. 10 UCLA	13	–	5	.722	20	–	7	.741
USC	9	–	9	.500	14	–	13	.519
Washington	8	–	10	.444	14	–	13	.519
Arizona	8	–	10	.444	13	–	14	.481
Oregon	6	–	12	.333	13	–	14	.481
California	5	–	13	.278	13	–	14	.481
Stanford	5	–	13	.278	9	–	18	.333
Washington State	3	–	15	.167	10	–	17	.370
Rankings from AP Poll

The 1980–81 Arizona State Sun Devils men's basketball team represented the Arizona State University during the 1980–81 NCAA Division I men's basketball season.

== Roster ==
1980–81 Arizona State Sun Devils men's basketball team
Players
Coaches

Pos.	#	Name	Height	Weight	Year	Hometown
G	12	Fat Lever	6 ft 2 in (1.88 m)	170 lb (77 kg)	Jr	Tucson, Arizona
C	53	Alton Lister	7 ft 0 in (2.13 m)	240 lb (109 kg)	Jr	Dallas, Texas
G	11	Byron Scott	6 ft 5 in (1.96 m)	195 lb (88 kg)	So	Inglewood, California
F	30	Sam Williams	6 ft 8 in (2.03 m)	210 lb (95 kg)	Sr	Los Angeles, California

Head coach

- Ned Wulk

Assistant coach(es)

Legend

- (C) Team captain
- (S) Suspended
- (I) Ineligible
- (W) Walk-on
- Injured
- Current redshirt

== Schedule ==
Date time, TV	Rank^{#}	Opponent^{#}	Result	Record	Site city, state
Regular season
December 2*		U. S. International	W 91–65	1–0	ASU Activity Center; Tempe, Arizona
December 5*		Montana State	W 92–71	2–0	ASU Activity Center; Tempe, Arizona
December 6*		Iowa	W 96–88	3–0	ASU Activity Center; Tempe, Arizona
December 8*	No. 15	Kansas State	W 84–61	4–0	ASU Activity Center; Tempe, Arizona
December 13*	No. 15	at New Mexico	W 86–83	5–0	The Pit; Albuquerque, NM
December 20*	No. 14	Ohio State	W 71–58	6–0	ASU Activity Center; Tempe, Arizona
December 22*	No. 11	Illinois Wesleyan	W 88–65	7–0	ASU Activity Center; Tempe, Arizona
December 28*	No. 11	vs. Tennessee; Sugar Bowl Tournament	L 53–69	7–1	Louisiana Superdome; New Orleans, Louisiana
December 30*	No. 13	at New Orleans	W 75–63	8–1	Human Performance Center; New Orleans, Louisiana
January 3	No. 13	No. 2 Oregon State	L 67–71	8–2 (0–1)	ASU Activity Center; Tempe, Arizona
January 5	No. 14	Oregon	W 104–64	9–2 (1–1)	ASU Activity Center; Tempe, Arizona
January 8	No. 14	at Washington State	W 62–59	10–2 (2–1)	Beasley Coliseum; Pullman, Washington
January 10	No. 14	at Washington	W 90–62	11–2 (3–1)	Hec Edmundson Pavilion; Seattle, Washington
January 16	No. 12	No. 8 UCLA	W 78–74 ^{3OT}	12–2 (4–1)	ASU Activity Center (14,384); Tempe, Arizona
January 17	No. 12	USC	W 69–55	13–2 (5–1)	ASU Activity Center; Tempe, Arizona
January 24	No. 7	Arizona	W 83–65	14–2 (6–1)	ASU Activity Center; Tempe, Arizona
January 31	No. 5	at Stanford	W 84–66	15–2 (7–1)	Maples Pavilion; Stanford, California
February 2	No. 5	at California	W 84–81	16–2 (8–1)	Harmon Gym; Berkeley, California
February 7	No. 5	Washington State	W 77–63	17–2 (9–1)	ASU Activity Center; Tempe, Arizona
February 9	No. 5	Washington	W 78–76	18–2 (10–1)	ASU Activity Center; Tempe, Arizona
February 12	No. 5	at USC	W 77–61	19–2 (11–1)	Los Angeles Sports Arena; Los Angeles, California
February 14	No. 5	at No. 8 UCLA	L 61–64	19–3 (11–2)	Pauley Pavilion (12,428); Los Angeles, California
February 21	No. 7	at Arizona	W 71–66	20–3 (12–2)	McKale Center; Tucson, Arizona
February 26	No. 5	Stanford	W 79–54	21–3 (13–2)	ASU Activity Center; Tempe, Arizona
February 28	No. 5	California	W 81–68	22–3 (14–2)	ASU Activity Center; Tempe, Arizona
March 5	No. 5	at Oregon	W 78–77	23–3 (15–2)	McArthur Court; Eugene, Oregon
March 7	No. 5	at No. 2 Oregon State	W 87–67	24–3 (16–2)	Gill Coliseum; Corvallis, Oregon
NCAA Tournament
March 15*	(2 MW) No. 3	vs. (7 MW) Kansas; Second round	L 71–88	24–4	Levitt Arena; Wichita, Kansas
*Non-conference game. ^{#}Rankings from AP Poll. (#) Tournament seedings in parentheses.
