= 1980–81 Cincinnati Bearcats men's basketball team =

American college basketball season

1980–81 Cincinnati Bearcats men's basketball
- Conference: Metro Conference (1975–1995)
- Record: 16–13 (6–6 Metro)
- Head coach: Ed Badger
- Home arena: Riverfront Coliseum

1980–81 Metro Conference men's basketball standings
	Conf.				Overall
Team	W		L	PCT	W		L	PCT
No. 12 Louisville †	11	–	1	.917	21	–	9	.700
Florida State	7	–	5	.583	17	–	11	.607
Cincinnati	6	–	6	.500	16	–	13	.552
Virginia Tech	6	–	6	.500	15	–	13	.536
Memphis State	5	–	7	.417	13	–	14	.481
Tulane	4	–	8	.333	12	–	15	.444
Saint Louis	3	–	9	.250	9	–	18	.333
† 1981 Metro Conference tournament winner Rankings from AP Poll

The 1980–81 Cincinnati Bearcats men's basketball team represented the University of Cincinnati during the 1980–81 NCAA Division I men's basketball season. The Bearcats were led by head coach Ed Badger, as members of the Metro Conference.

== Roster ==
1980–81 Cincinnati Bearcats men's basketball team
Players
Coaches

Pos.	#	Name	Height	Weight	Year	Hometown
G	14	Bobby Austin	6 ft 3 in (1.91 m)	190 lb (86 kg)	Jr	Cincinnati, Ohio
F	43	Jeff Bentley	6 ft 4 in (1.93 m)	190 lb (86 kg)	Sr	Mason, Ohio
F	4	Lonnie Cooper	6 ft 8 in (2.03 m)	180 lb (82 kg)	Sr	Los Angeles, California
F	44	Mark Dorris	6 ft 5 in (1.96 m)	195 lb (88 kg)	Fr	Cincinnati, Ohio
F	41	David Duarte	6 ft 8 in (2.03 m)	205 lb (93 kg)	Jr	Providence, RI
G	10	David Kennedy	6 ft 2 in (1.88 m)	170 lb (77 kg)	Jr	Pittsburgh, PA
F	22	Greg Slider	6 ft 5 in (1.96 m)	205 lb (93 kg)	Jr	Los Angeles, California

Head coach

- Ed Badger

Assistant coach(es)

Legend

- (C) Team captain
- (S) Suspended
- (I) Ineligible
- (W) Walk-on
- Injured
- Current redshirt

== Schedule ==
Date time, TV	Rank^{#}	Opponent^{#}	Result	Record	Site city, state
December 1*		Rollins	W 80–61	1–0	Riverfront Coliseum; Cincinnati, Ohio
December 5*		vs. No. 12 Iowa	L 64–69	1–1	ASU Activity Center; Tempe, Arizona
December 6*		vs. Montana State	W 77–75	2–1	ASU Activity Center; Tempe, Arizona
December 10*		at Miami (OH)	L 87–91	2–2	Millett Hall; Oxford, Ohio
December 13*		at Temple	L 48–63	2–3	McGonigle Hall; Philadelphia, Pennsylvania
December 17*		Bradley	W 75–64	3–3	Riverfront Coliseum; Cincinnati, Ohio
December 20*		Holy Cross	L 58–69	3–4	Riverfront Coliseum; Cincinnati, Ohio
December 22*		at VCU	L 58–78	3–5	Richmond Coliseum; Richmond, Virginia
December 30*		Dayton	W 80–77	4–5	Riverfront Coliseum; Cincinnati, Ohio
January 3*		Illinois-Chicago	W 87–70	5–5	Riverfront Coliseum; Cincinnati, Ohio
January 5		Florida State	L 77–79	5–6 (0–1)	Riverfront Coliseum; Cincinnati, Ohio
January 10		Louisville	L 68–83	5–7 (0–2)	Riverfront Coliseum; Cincinnati, Ohio
January 12*		Boston University	W 102–82	6–7 (0–2)	Riverfront Coliseum; Cincinnati, Ohio
January 17		Virginia Tech	W 82–77	7–7 (1–2)	Riverfront Coliseum; Cincinnati, Ohio
January 22*		at Duquesne	L 77–85	7–8 (1–2)	Civic Arena; Pittsburgh, Pennsylvania
January 24		at St. Louis	W 66–57	8–8 (2–2)	The Checkerdome; St. Louis, Missouri
January 27		at Tulane	L 50–65	8–9 (2–3)	Avron B. Fogelman Arena; New Orleans, Louisiana
January 31		Memphis	L 85–99	8–10 (2–4)	Riverfront Coliseum; Cincinnati, Ohio
February 3*		at Loyola (IL)	W 78–76	9–10 (2–4)	Rosemont Horizon; Rosemont, Illinois
February 7		at Memphis	W 65–62	10–10 (3–4)	Mid-South Coliseum; Memphis, Tennessee
February 10		Tulane	W 91–76	11–10 (4–4)	Riverfront Coliseum; Cincinnati, Ohio
February 14		at Florida State	W 80–79	12–10 (5–4)	Tully Gymnasium; Tallahassee, Florida
February 18*		Xavier	W 79–72	13–10 (5–4)	Riverfront Coliseum; Cincinnati, Ohio
February 21		St. Louis	W 59–50	14–10 (6–4)	Riverfront Coliseum; Cincinnati, Ohio
February 23		at Louisville	L 67–81	14–11 (6–5)	Freedom Hall; Louisville, Kentucky
February 28		at Virginia Tech	L 92–115	14–12 (6–6)	Cassell Coliseum; Blacksburg, Virginia
Metro Tournament
March 6		vs. Tulane	W 67–66	15–12 (6–6)	Freedom Hall; Louisville, Kentucky
March 7		vs. Florida State	W 58–57	16–12 (6–6)	Freedom Hall; Louisville, Kentucky
March 8		at Louisville	L 31–42	16–13 (6–6)	Freedom Hall; Louisville, Kentucky
*Non-conference game. ^{#}Rankings from AP Poll. (#) Tournament seedings in parentheses.
