= 1980–81 Louisville Cardinals men's basketball team =

American college basketball season

1980–81 Louisville Cardinals men's basketball

Metro Conference Champions Metro Conference tournament champions

NCAA Men's Division I Tournament, Second Round
- Conference: Metro Conference (1975–1995)

Ranking
- Coaches: No. 13
- AP: No. 12
- Record: 21–9 (11–1 Metro)
- Head coach: Denny Crum (10th season)
- Captain: Game captains
- Home arena: Freedom Hall

1980–81 Metro Conference men's basketball standings
	Conf.				Overall
Team	W		L	PCT	W		L	PCT
No. 12 Louisville †	11	–	1	.917	21	–	9	.700
Florida State	7	–	5	.583	17	–	11	.607
Cincinnati	6	–	6	.500	16	–	13	.552
Virginia Tech	6	–	6	.500	15	–	13	.536
Memphis State	5	–	7	.417	13	–	14	.481
Tulane	4	–	8	.333	12	–	15	.444
Saint Louis	3	–	9	.250	9	–	18	.333
† 1981 Metro Conference tournament winner Rankings from AP Poll

The 1980–81 Louisville Cardinals men's basketball team represented the University of Louisville during the 1980-81 NCAA Division I men's basketball season, Louisville's 67th season of intercollegiate competition. The Cardinals competed in the Metro Conference and were coached by Denny Crum, who was in his tenth season. The team played its home games at Freedom Hall.

The Cardinals won the Metro Conference tournament championship (their 3rd), defeating Cincinnati 42–31. As defending Champion Louisville was upset by a half-court shot by U.S. Reed and lost to Arkansas 74–73 in the NCAA tournament second round. The Cardinals finished with a 21–9 (11–1) record.

== Roster ==
1980–81 Louisville Cardinals men's basketball team
Players
Coaches

Pos.	#	Name	Height	Weight	Year	Previous school	Hometown
G	4	Lancaster Gordon	6 ft 3 in (1.91 m)	185 lb (84 kg)	Fr	Jim Hill	Jackson, Mississippi
G	5	Jerry Eaves	6 ft 4 in (1.93 m)	180 lb (82 kg)	Jr	Ballard	Louisville, Kentucky
G	14	Greg Deuser	6 ft 0 in (1.83 m)	170 lb (77 kg)	Jr	Floyd Central	New Albany, Indiana
F	21	Scooter McCray	6 ft 8 in (2.03 m)	185 lb (84 kg)	Jr	Mount Vernon	Mount Vernon, New York
F/C	22	Rodney McCray	6 ft 7 in (2.01 m)	220 lb (100 kg)	So	Mount Vernon	Mount Vernon, New York
G	34	Roger Burkman	6 ft 5 in (1.96 m)	175 lb (79 kg)	Sr	Franklin Central	Indianapolis, Indiana
C	40	Marty Pulliam	6 ft 9 in (2.06 m)	225 lb (102 kg)	Jr	Mercer Country Senior	Harrodsburg, Kentucky
C	41	Wiley Brown	6 ft 8 in (2.03 m)	220 lb (100 kg)	Jr	Worth County	Sylvester, Georgia
F	43	Derek Smith	6 ft 6 in (1.98 m)	205 lb (93 kg)	Jr	Hogansville	Hogansville, Georgia
G/F	44	Poncho Wright	6 ft 5 in (1.96 m)	195 lb (88 kg)	Jr	Marshall	Indianapolis, Indiana

Head coach

- Denny Crum

Assistant coach(es)

Legend

- (C) Team captain
- (S) Suspended
- (I) Ineligible
- (W) Walk-on
- Injured
- Current redshirt

== Schedule ==
Date time, TV	Rank^{#}	Opponent^{#}	Result	Record	Site city, state
November 22*; TVS	No. 3	vs. No. 2 DePaul; Hall of Fame Game	L 80–86	0–1	Springfield Civic Center (8,937); Springfield, MA
December 4		at Tulsa	L 60–68	0–2	Tulsa, OK
December 6*		at Oklahoma State	L 71–72	0–3	Stillwater, OK
December 13*; NBC		No. 4 Maryland	W 78–67	1–3	Freedom Hall; Louisville, KY
December 20*	No. 20	Utah	L 59–78	1–4	Freedom Hall; Louisville, KY
December 22*		Minnesota	L 59–62	1–5	Freedom Hall; Louisville, KY
December 29*		vs. No. 6 North Carolina; Winston Tire Classic	L 64–86	1–6	L.A. Sports Arena; Los Angeles, CA
December 30*		vs. USC; Winston Tire Classic	W 79–50	2–6	L.A. Sports Arena; Los Angeles, CA
January 3*		at Kansas State	L 47–64	2–7	Ahearn Field House; Manhattan, KS
January 5		at Tulane	W 73–53	3–7 (1–0)	Louisiana Superdome; New Orleans, LA
January 10		at Cincinnati	W 83–68	4–7 (2–0)	Riverfront Coliseum; Cincinnati, OH
January 17		Florida State	W 98–78	5–7 (3–0)	Freedom Hall; Louisville, KY
January 18*		Missouri	W 71–49	6–7	Freedom Hall (13,386); Louisville, KY
January 22*		at Memphis State	L 55–60 ^{OT}	6–8 (3–1)	Mid-South Coliseum; Memphis, TN
January 27*		Providence	W 71–55	7–8	Freedom Hall; Louisville, KY
January 29		St. Louis	W 61–57	8–8 (4–1)	Freedom Hall; Louisville, KY
January 31		Virginia Tech	W 92–70	9–8 (5–1)	Freedom Hall; Louisville, KY
February 2*		US International	W 86–68	10–8	Freedom Hall; Louisville, KY
February 4		Tulane	W 85–58	11–8 (6–1)	Freedom Hall; Louisville, KY
February 7		at Florida State	W 82–73 ^{OT}	12–8 (7–1)	Tully Gymnasium; Tallahassee, FL
February 9		at Virginia Tech	W 71–66	13–8 (8–1)	Cassell Coliseum; Blacksburg, VA
February 13*		at Marquette	W 79–60	14–8	MECCA Arena (11,052); Milwaukee, WI
February 16		Memphis State	W 95–65	15–8 (9–1)	Freedom Hall; Louisville, KY
February 18*		Iona	W 91–57	16–8	Freedom Hall; Louisville, KY
February 23		Cincinnati	W 81–67	17–8 (10–1)	Freedom Hall; Louisville, KY
February 25		at St. Louis	W 97–85	18–8 (11–1)	The Checkersdome; St. Louis, MO
February 28*	No. 20	Western Kentucky	W 90–75	19–8	Freedom Hall; Louisville, KY
Metro Tournament
March 7*	(1)	(4) Virginia Tech; Semifinals	W 81–68	20–8	Freedom Hall; Louisville, KY
March 8*	(1)	(3) Cincinnati; Final	W 42–31	21–8	Freedom Hall; Louisville, KY
NCAA tournament
March 14*; NBC	(4 MW) No. 12	vs. (5 MW) No. 20 Arkansas; First Round	L 73–74	21–9	Frank Erwin Center; Austin, TX
*Non-conference game. ^{#}Rankings from AP Poll. (#) Tournament seedings in parentheses. MW=Midwest. All times are in Eastern Time.
