= 1980–81 Washington State Cougars men's basketball team =

American college basketball season

1980–81 Washington State Cougars men's basketball
- Conference: Pacific-10
- Record: 10–17 (3–15 Pac-10)
- Head coach: George Raveling (9th season)
- Home arena: Beasley Coliseum

1980–81 Pacific-10 Conference men's basketball standings
	Conf.				Overall
Team	W		L	PCT	W		L	PCT
No. 2 Oregon State	17	–	1	.944	26	–	2	.929
No. 3 Arizona State	16	–	2	.889	24	–	4	.857
No. 10 UCLA	13	–	5	.722	20	–	7	.741
USC	9	–	9	.500	14	–	13	.519
Washington	8	–	10	.444	14	–	13	.519
Arizona	8	–	10	.444	13	–	14	.481
Oregon	6	–	12	.333	13	–	14	.481
California	5	–	13	.278	13	–	14	.481
Stanford	5	–	13	.278	9	–	18	.333
Washington State	3	–	15	.167	10	–	17	.370
Rankings from AP Poll

The 1980–81 Washington State Cougars men's basketball team represented Washington State University for the 1980–81 NCAA Division I men's basketball season. Led by tenth-year head coach George Raveling, the Cougars were members of the Pacific-10 Conference and played their home games on campus at Beasley Coliseum in Pullman, Washington.

The Cougars were 10–17 overall in the regular season and 3–15 in conference play, last in the standings. There was no conference tournament yet, which debuted six years later. The previous season, WSU made the 48-team NCAA tournament and finished at 22–6, among the best records in school history.

This was the Cougars' first losing season in six years, since 1974–75.
