= 1981 Metro Conference men's basketball tournament =

- Classification: Division I
- Season: 1980–81
- Teams: 7
- Site: Freedom Hall; Louisville, KY
- Champions: Louisville (3rd title)
- Winning coach: Denny Crum (3rd title)
- MVP: Rodney McCray (Louisville)

1980–81 Metro Conference men's basketball standings
	Conf.				Overall
Team	W		L	PCT	W		L	PCT
No. 12 Louisville †	11	–	1	.917	21	–	9	.700
Florida State	7	–	5	.583	17	–	11	.607
Cincinnati	6	–	6	.500	16	–	13	.552
Virginia Tech	6	–	6	.500	15	–	13	.536
Memphis State	5	–	7	.417	13	–	14	.481
Tulane	4	–	8	.333	12	–	15	.444
Saint Louis	3	–	9	.250	9	–	18	.333
† 1981 Metro Conference tournament winner Rankings from AP Poll

The 1981 Metro Conference men's basketball tournament was held March 6–8 at Freedom Hall in Louisville, Kentucky.

Top-seeded Louisville defeated Cincinnati in the championship game, 42–31, to win their third Metro men's basketball tournament.

The Cardinals received an automatic bid to the 1981 NCAA Tournament, serving as the conference's lone representative.

== Format ==
All seven of the conference's members participated in the tournament field. They were seeded based on regular season conference records, with the top team earning a bye into the semifinal round. The other six teams entered into the preliminary first round.

== Bracket ==
First round Thursday, March 6
5	Memphis State	66
4	Virginia Tech	72
3	Cincinnati	67
6	Tulane	66
7	Saint Louis	77
2	Florida State	84

Semifinals; Saturday, March 7
1	Louisville	81
4	Virginia Tech	68
3	Cincinnati	58
2	Florida State	57

Championship; Sunday, March 8
1	Louisville	42
3	Cincinnati	31
