= Ricky Stokes =

American basketball coach (born 1962)

Biographical details
- Born: March 29, 1962 (age 64); Richmond, Virginia, U.S.

Playing career
- 1980–1984: Virginia
- Position: Point guard

Coaching career (HC unless noted)
- 1984–1985: Virginia (assistant)
- 1988–1989: Bowling Green (assistant)
- 1989–1997: Wake Forest (assistant)
- 1997–1998: Virginia (assistant)
- 1998–1999: Texas (assistant)
- 1999–2003: Virginia Tech
- 2003–2005: South Carolina (assistant)
- 2005–2007: East Carolina

Ricky Leonard Stokes (born March 29, 1962) is an American athletics administrator and former men's college basketball coach who is currently the associate commissioner of men's basketball for the Mid-American Conference.

== Player ==
Stokes played at Highland Springs High School for Coach George Lancaster before committing to Coach Terry Holland. As a point guard for the Virginia Cavaliers, Stokes set the record for career games played with 134, a record that he still holds. The Cavaliers made the NCAA Men's Division I Basketball Championship each year that Stokes was with the team and during the three years that Stokes played along the legendary Ralph Sampson, the team earned a #1 seed. At the end of the 1983-1984 season, he was awarded the Frances Pomeroy Naismith Award by the National Association of Basketball Coaches.

== Coach ==
Stokes was hired in 1999 by Jim Weaver, the new director of athletics at Virginia Tech, to replace the fired Bobby Hussey.

In his first year as coach, Stokes brought the Hokies their first winning season since the departure of Bill Foster but that year would be his high water mark in Blacksburg. Beginning with the 2000–01 season, the Hokies departed the Atlantic 10 Conference and joined the much tougher Big East. Stokes was unable to recruit Big East level talent to Virginia Tech and the team's record suffered accordingly.

The highlight of his four seasons at Tech were blowout wins over #18 Connecticut and rival Virginia his final year. Stokes was dismissed after a third straight losing season and a 10–38 overall record in the Big East. In none of these three years in the Big East was Virginia Tech able to qualify for the conference post-season tournament under Stokes.

After two years as an assistant coach at the University of South Carolina, Stokes was hired as the head men's basketball coach at East Carolina University after the 2004–2005 season. After compiling a 14–44 record in two seasons, Stokes chose to resign rather than accept an administrative position within the ECU athletic department.

The Mid-American Conference named Stokes the associate commissioner for men's basketball in 2010.

== Head coaching record ==
Record table
Season	Team	Overall	Conference	Standing	Postseason
Virginia Tech Hokies (Atlantic 10 Conference) (1999–2000)
1999–00	Virginia Tech	16–15	8–8	4th (West)	
Virginia Tech Hokies (Big East Conference) (2000–2003)
2000–01	Virginia Tech	8–19	2–14	7th (East)	
2001–02	Virginia Tech	10–18	4–12	7th (East)	
2002–03	Virginia Tech	12–17	4–12	7th (East)	
Virginia Tech:		46–69 (.400)	18–46		
East Carolina Pirates (Conference USA) (2005–2007)
2005–06	East Carolina	8–20	2–12	12th	
2006–07	East Carolina	6–24	1–13	12th	
East Carolina:		14–44 (.241)	3–25 (.107)		
Total:		59–113 (.343)			
