= 1984 Metro Conference men's basketball tournament =

- Classification: Division I
- Season: 1983–84
- Teams: 8
- Site: Mid-South Coliseum; Memphis, TN
- Champions: Memphis State (2nd title)
- Winning coach: Dana Kirk (2nd title)
- MVP: Keith Lee (Memphis State)
- Television: Sports Productions, Inc. (quarterfinals and semifinals), CBS (Championship Game)

1983–84 Metro Conference men's basketball standings
| | Conf. | | | | Overall |
| Team | W | | L | PCT | W | | L | PCT |
|---|---|---|---|---|---|---|---|---|
| No. 16 Memphis State † | 11 | – | 3 | .786 | 26 | – | 7 | .788 |
| Louisville | 11 | – | 3 | .786 | 24 | – | 11 | .686 |
| Florida State | 9 | – | 5 | .643 | 20 | – | 11 | .645 |
| Virginia Tech | 8 | – | 6 | .571 | 22 | – | 13 | .629 |
| Tulane | 7 | – | 7 | .500 | 17 | – | 11 | .607 |
| South Carolina | 5 | – | 9 | .357 | 12 | – | 16 | .429 |
| Southern Miss | 4 | – | 10 | .286 | 13 | – | 15 | .464 |
| Cincinnati | 0 | – | 14 | .000 | 3 | – | 25 | .107 |
† 1984 Metro Conference tournament winner Rankings from AP Poll

The 1984 Metro Conference men's basketball tournament was held March 8–10 at the Mid-South Coliseum in Memphis, Tennessee.

Memphis State defeated Virginia Tech in the championship game, 78–65, to win their second Metro men's basketball tournament.

The Tigers received the conference's automatic bid to the 1984 NCAA Tournament. Additionally, Louisville received an at-large bid.

== Format ==
All eight members of the conference participated. Teams were seeded based on regular season conference records. This was the first tournament for South Carolina, who joined the Metro Conference after playing as an Independent.

== Bracket ==
Quarterfinal; Thursday, March 8, SPI
1 | #18 Louisville | 62
8 | Cincinnati | 55
4 | Virginia Tech | 49
5 | Tulane | 47
3 | Florida State | 72
6 | South Carolina | 65
7 | Southern Miss | 58
2 | #17 Memphis State | 86

Semifinals; Friday, March 9, SPI
1 | #18 Louisville | 61
4 | Virginia Tech | 69
3 | Florida State | 63
2 | #17 Memphis State | 65

Championship; Saturday, March 10, CBS
4 | Virginia Tech | 65
2 | #17 Memphis State | 78
