= Michael Schwartz (basketball, born 1976) =

American basketball coach

Michael "Mike" Schwartz
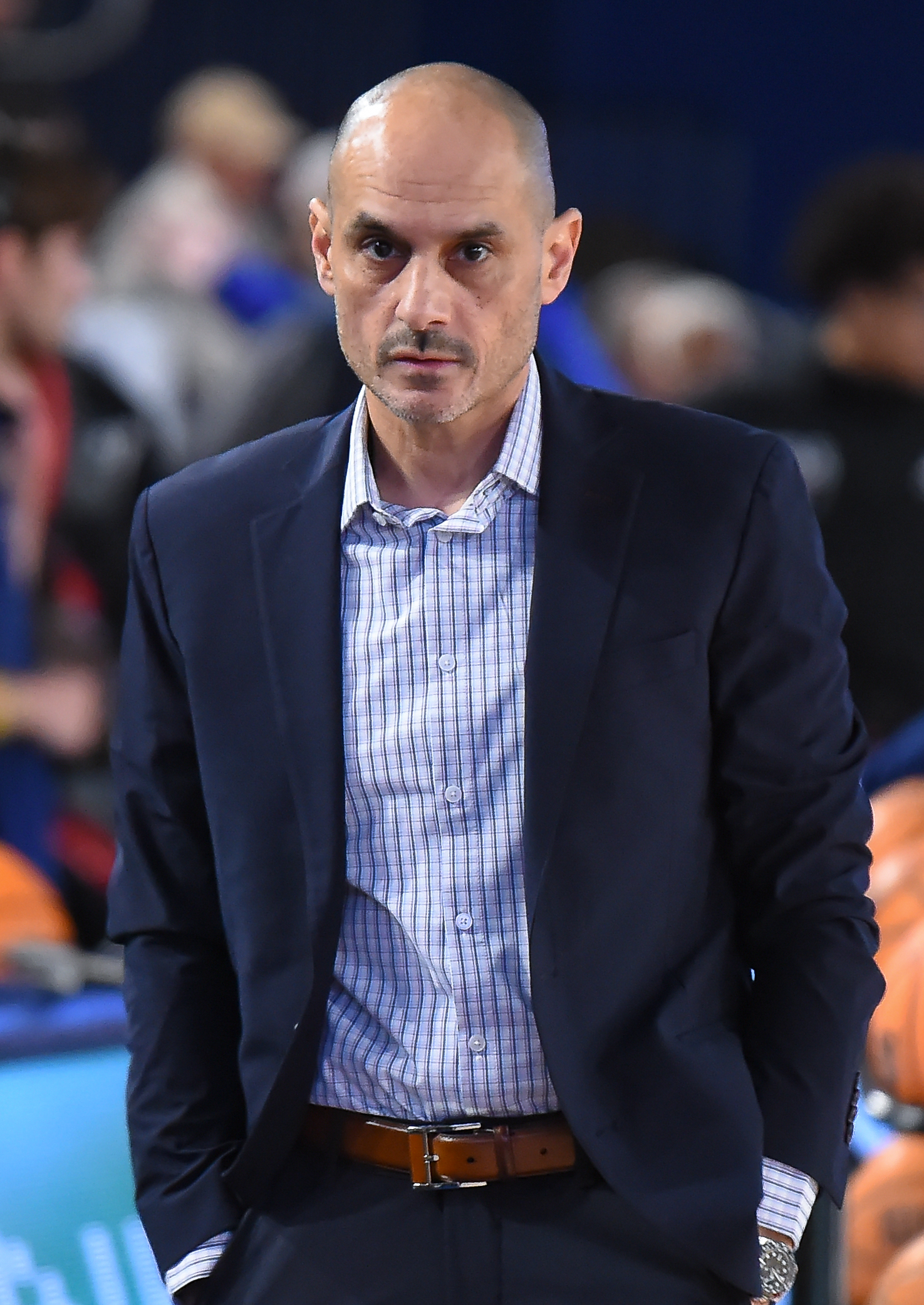
- Schwartz with East Carolina in 2026

Current position
- Title: Head coach
- Team: East Carolina
- Conference: American
- Record: 64–70 (.478)

Biographical details
- Born: September 25, 1976 (age 50); Los Angeles, California, U.S.

Playing career
- 1997–1998: Sonoma State
- 1998–1999: Texas

Coaching career (HC unless noted)
- 1999–2001: Texas (GA)
- 2004–2005: UTSA (assistant)
- 2007–2011: Miami (FL) (assistant)
- 2011–2015: Fresno State (assistant)
- 2015–2016: Tulsa (assistant)
- 2016–2022: Tennessee (assistant)
- 2022–present: East Carolina

Administrative career (AD unless noted)
- 2001–2002: Long Beach State (video)
- 2002–2004: Texas (video)
- 2005–2007: Miami (FL) (DBO)

Head coaching record
- Overall: 64–70 (.478)

Michael Schwartz (born September 25, 1976) is an American basketball coach and head coach of the East Carolina Pirates men's basketball team.

== Playing career ==
Schwartz played high school basketball at Beverly Hills High School, and his first two seasons of college basketball at Division II Sonoma State. He would then transfer to Texas to play for Rick Barnes during the 1998–99 season, appearing in one game of the Longhorns' Big 12 regular-season title winning team.

== Coaching career ==
After graduation, Schwartz remained with the Longhorns as a graduate assistant, before making a one-year stop at Long Beach State as a video coach. He'd return to Texas in the same capacity before landing his first full-time assistant coaching position at UTSA. Schwartz would then move on to Miami in an administrative role under Frank Haith before being elevated to assistant coach. In 2011, he'd accept an assistant coaching position at Fresno State from 2011 to 2015. Schwartz would reunite with Haith at Tulsa for one season in 2015 before joining Barnes at Tennessee where he was on staff for the Volunteers' 2017–18 SEC regular season title, four NCAA tournament appearances, and a 2022 SEC tournament title.

On March 16, 2022, Schwartz was named head coach at East Carolina, replacing Joe Dooley.

== Head coaching record ==
Record table
Season	Team	Overall	Conference	Standing	Postseason
East Carolina Pirates (American Athletic Conference) (2022–present)
2022–23	East Carolina	16–17	6–12	9th	
2023–24	East Carolina	15–18	7–11	T–8th	
2024–25	East Carolina	19–14	10–8	T–5th	
2025–26	East Carolina	11–20	6–12	12th	
2026–27	East Carolina	3–1	0–0		
East Carolina:		64–70 (.478)	29–43 (.403)		
Total:		64–70 (.478)			
National champion Postseason invitational champion Conference regular season champion Conference regular season and conference tournament champion Division regular season champion Division regular season and conference tournament champion Conference tournament champion
