= Charlie Harrison (basketball) =

American basketball coach (1949–2020)

Biographical details
- Born: August 17, 1949; Nash County, North Carolina, U.S.
- Died: April 13, 2020 (aged 70); Atlantic Beach, North Carolina, U.S.
- Education: Guilford

Coaching career (HC unless noted)
- 1971–1973: Indiana (GA)
- 1973–1974: Clemson (assistant)
- 1974–1975: Oklahoma (assistant)
- 1975–1977: Buffalo Braves (assistant)
- 1978–1979: Oklahoma (volunteer assistant)
- 1979–1980: New Mexico
- 1980–1982: Iowa State (assistant)
- 1982–1987: East Carolina

Head coaching record
- Overall: 58–111 (.343)

Charles Dunn Harrison (August 17, 1949 – April 13, 2020) was an American college basketball coach who served as head coach at the University of New Mexico and East Carolina University.

== Career ==
A graduate of Guilford College, Harrison began his coaching career as a graduate assistant for Bob Knight at Indiana. He then held assistant positions with Clemson, Oklahoma and the National Basketball Association's Buffalo Braves.

In 1979, following a second stint at Oklahoma, Harrison was hired as an assistant at New Mexico under head coach Norm Ellenberger. However, right before the team's season opener Ellenberger was suspended and later fired following the revelation of an academic fraud scandal nicknamed “Lobogate.” Harrison was tapped as the new head coach and led the depleted team to a 6–22 record. Following the season he was replaced by the more seasoned Gary Colson.

After a two-year stint as an assistant at Iowa State under Johnny Orr, Harrison was named head coach at East Carolina (ECU). He led the Pirates for five seasons, compiling a record of 51–90. In January, 1987, Harrison announced he would step down from ECU at the close of the season.

Harrison died on April 13, 2020, at age 70.

== Head coaching record ==
Record table
Season	Team	Overall	Conference	Standing	Postseason
New Mexico Lobos (Western Athletic Conference) (1979–1980)
1979–80	New Mexico	7–21	3–11	7th	
New Mexico:		7–21 (.250)	3–11 (.214)		
East Carolina Pirates (ECAC South/Colonial Athletic Association) (1982–1987)
1982–83	East Carolina	16–13	3–7	5th	
1983–84	East Carolina	4–24	1–9	6th	
1984–85	East Carolina	7–21	1–13	8th	
1985–86	East Carolina	12–16	6–8	5th	
1986–87	East Carolina	12–16	4–10	7th	
East Carolina:		51–90 (.362)	15–47 (.242)		
Total:		58–111 (.343)			
