= East Carolina Pirates men's basketball =

Men's college basketball team

2025–26 East Carolina Pirates men's basketball team
- University: East Carolina University
- First season: 1931–32
- Head coach: Mike Schwartz (4th season)
- Location: Greenville, North Carolina
- Arena: Williams Arena at Minges Coliseum (capacity: 8,000)
- Conference: The American
- Nickname: Pirates
- Colors: Purple and gold
- Student section: Minges Maniacs
- All-time record: 1,170–1,248 (.484)

NCAA Division I tournament appearances
- 1972, 1993

Conference tournament champions
- 1972, 1993

The East Carolina Pirates men's basketball team represents East Carolina University in NCAA Division I college basketball and competes in the American Conference. The Pirates are coached by Mike Schwartz. They play their games at Williams Arena at Minges Coliseum. East Carolina has appeared twice in the NCAA Division I men's basketball tournament, most recently in 1993.

== History ==
Basketball became the first intercollegiate sport at East Carolina, beginning with the 1931–1932 season. The Pirates joined the NAIA North State Conference in 1947, winning the conference title in 1953–54 and appeared in the NAIA National Tournament two years in 1953 and '54, winning two district titles before losing in the first round of the national finals. Ten years later, ECU made the jump to Division I as a member of the Southern Conference and became a full-fledged member during the 1965–66 season. ECU captured the SoCon tournament title in 1972 and reached the NCAA tournament for the first time. Three years later, ECU returned to the postseason when it received an invitation to inaugural Collegiate Commissioners Tournament, losing to Arizona in the first round. ECU withdrew from the Southern Conference two years later, opting to remain a Division I-A football institution and an independent in all other sports.

ECU joined the East Coast Athletic Conference and competed in the South Division in 1981–82. The seven members of the division formed the Colonial Athletic Association in 1985. Theodore "Blue" Edwards was named the conference's Player-of-the-Year for 1988–89 and as selected by the Utah Jazz with the 21st overall pick of the 1989 NBA draft. Two years later, ECU hired Eddie Payne as its head coach and in his second year he led the Pirates to a memorable three-day run through the 1993 CAA Championship tournament and the program's first NCAA appearance in 21 years. ECU lost to eventual national champion North Carolina in the first round. Payne coached the Pirates for four seasons before giving way to his top assistant Joe Dooley, who also led the program for four seasons (1995–99) and compiled the highest winning percentage in the school's Division I history.

After 15 years as a member of the CAA, ECU joined Conference USA in 2001–02 and its first season earned its first-ever victory over an AP Top-10 team, defeating No. 9 Marquette. The Pirates spent 13 seasons in C-USA before becoming a member of the newly formed American Athletic Conference in 2014–15. As a member of Conference USA, ECU made three consecutive appearances in the CIT postseason tournament, claiming the tournament championship in 2013 as Akeem Richmond's buzzer-beater gave the Pirates a championship game win over Weber State.

East Carolina has had four players to reach the NBA level. In addition to Edwards, Oliver Mack who was selected by the Los Angeles Lakers as the third pick in the second round of the 1979 NBA draft, George Maynor, who was selected by the Chicago Bulls as the sixth pick in the fourth round of the 1979 NBA Draft, and Charles Alford, who was selected by the Los Angeles Lakers as the ninth pick in the 10th round of the 1968 NBA draft.

== Williams Arena at Minges Coliseum ==
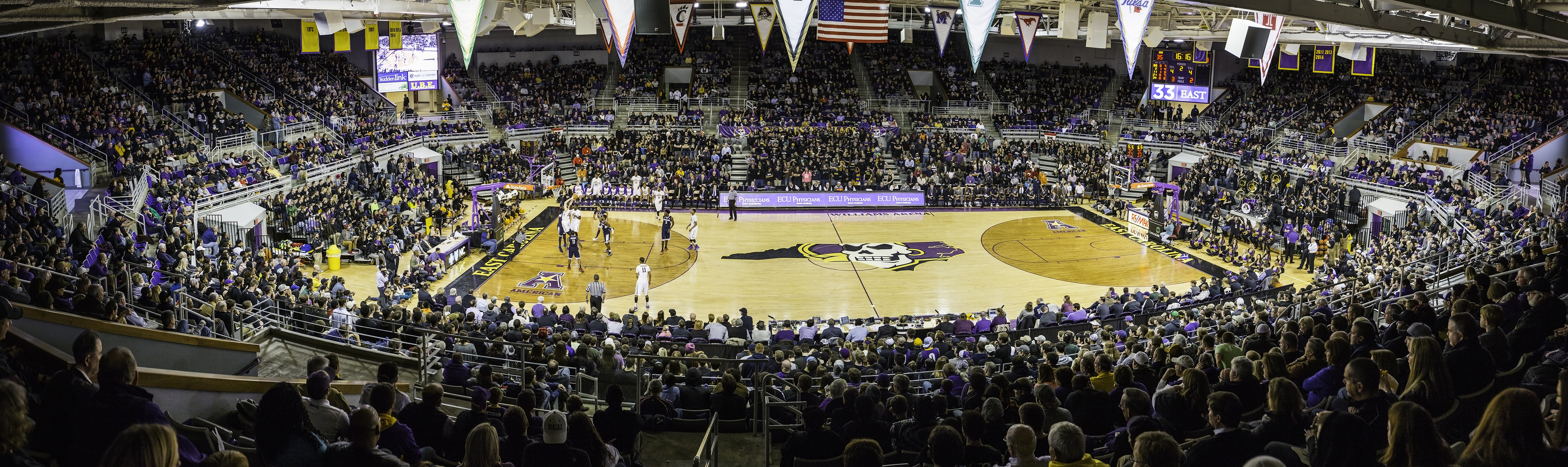
The interior of Williams Arena at Minges Coliseum.

The Pirates play their home games at the 8,000-seat Williams Arena at Minges Coliseum. The arena is connected to the second level of the Murphy Center, the Pirates' athletic training facility, by an indoor walkway.

Constructed at a cost of $2 million, Minges Coliseum was dedicated on Jan. 27, 1968, in the name of the Minges family of Greenville, N.C. As owners of Pepsi-Cola bottling operations in Greenville, Kinston and New Bern, the Minges family has provided leadership and support of East Carolina University Athletics over the years, going back to the days when Dr. Ray Minges served as President of the Century Club (forerunner of the Pirate Club), from 1965–68. After 27 years of basketball, Minges Coliseum underwent a facelift prior to the 1994–95 season.

Williams Arena is named in honor and recognition of Walter and Marie Williams for their support of East Carolina Athletics over the years. As alumni of East Carolina College, Walter and Marie have endowed two Men's Basketball Position scholarships, the Spirit of the East Post-Eligibility Scholarship, and an unrestricted student-athlete scholarship on behalf of the University's athletics program. Further, through Trade Oil Company, the Williams family gave the first $1 million gift ever given to the Educational Foundation in support of ECU Athletics, through the Shared Visions Campaign. In addition to his financial support, Walter Williams has given his time unselfishly in support of the Pirate Club. During 1997–98, Walter served as Executive President of the Educational Foundation.

== Smith-Williams Center ==
The Smith-Williams Center, which is structurally connected to Minges Coliseum, is the headquarters for and is devoted exclusively to the men's and women's basketball programs, providing them with a state-of-the-art venue in which to practice, train and condition. The 49,000-square-foot (4,600 m^{2}), multi-level facility, which opened in 2013, features mirror-image practice courts, locker rooms, coaches' offices, meeting rooms, and training rooms for each program, and houses the Athletics Hall of Fame, which features an interactive display of the history of intercollegiate athletics at ECU. Named in honor of principal donors Harry and Tammy Smith and Walter and Marie Williams, the center has a total project cost of $17 million that was funded entirely through private gifts. The Smith's commitment of $1 million toward the Step Up To The Highest Level Campaign in December 2011, coupled with leadership gifts from the Williams family and contributions of numerous other donors enabled the construction of the facility. Each court is named for donors who contributed significantly to the Step Up To The Highest Level campaign. The floor inside the women's practice gym is called Barnhill Court, in recognition of the financial support of Bob Barnhill of Tarboro. The men's gym floor is named Rogers-Whitaker court, in appreciation of the monetary gifts of Mike and Janet Rogers of Cary, N.C., and Don and Donna Whitaker of Virginia Beach, Va. Whitaker was a two-year ECU basketball letterman for coaches Dave Patton and Larry Gillman.

== Post season results ==
=== NCAA tournament ===
The Pirates have appeared in two NCAA tournaments. Their combined record is 0–2.

Year	Round	Opponent	Result
1972	First Round	Villanova	L 70–85
1993	First Round	North Carolina	L 65–85

=== CIT ===
The Pirates have appeared in three CollegeInsider.com Postseason Tournaments (CIT). Their combined record is 5–2 and they were CIT champions in 2013.

Year	Round	Opponent	Result
2011	First Round	Jacksonville	L 66–71 ^{OT}
2013	First Round; Second Round; Quarterfinals; Semifinals; Finals	Savannah State; Rider; Loyola (MD); Evansville; Weber State	W 66–65; W 75–54; W 70–58; W 81–58; W 77–74
2014	First Round	Wright State	L 59–73

=== NCIT ===
The Pirates appeared in one of the only two ever Collegiate Commissioners Association Tournaments. Their record was 0–1.

Year	Round	Opponent	Result
1975	Quarterfinals	Arizona	L 78–94

=== NAIA ===
The Pirates have appeared in two NAIA tournaments. Their record was 0-2

Year	Round	Opponent	Result
1953	First Round	Arkansas Polytechnic	L 81-85
1954	First Round	St. Benedict's(KS)	L 61-68

== Retired number ==
No.	Player	Pos.	Tenure	No. ret.	Ref.
14	Sonny Russell		1949–53	2000	

== Pirates drafted by NBA ==
The following former East Carolina players were selected in the NBA draft:

- Charles Alford
- Blue Edwards
- Bob Hodges
- Elijah Hughes
- Oliver Mack
- George Maynor
- Tristen Newton

== Players in the NBA ==
- Oliver Mack – 1979–1982
- Theodore "Blue" Edwards – 1989–1999
- Jonathan Kerner – 1997
- Elijah Hughes – 2016

== Players in foreign leagues ==
- Maurice Kemp (born 1991), basketball player in the Israeli Basketball Premier League
