= 1980–81 NCAA Division I men's basketball season =

Basketball season

- Preseason AP No. 1: Kentucky Wildcats
- NCAA Tournament: 1981
- Tournament dates: March 12 – 30, 1981
- National Championship: The Spectrum; Philadelphia, Pennsylvania
- NCAA Champions: Indiana Hoosiers
- Helms National Champions: Indiana Hoosiers
- Other champions: Tulsa Golden Hurricanes (NIT)
- Player of the Year (Naismith, Wooden): Ralph Sampson, Virginia Cavaliers (Naismith); Danny Ainge, BYU Cougars (Wooden)
- Player of the Year (Helms): Mark Aguirre, DePaul Blue Demons

The 1980–81 NCAA Division I men's basketball season began on November 28, 1980, progressed through the regular season and conference tournaments, and concluded with the 1981 NCAA Division I men's basketball tournament championship game on March 30, 1981, at The Spectrum in Philadelphia. The Indiana Hoosiers won their fourth NCAA national championship with a 63–50 victory over the North Carolina Tar Heels.

== Rule Changes ==
- On free throw attempts, players can now enter the free-throw lane after the foul shooter releases the ball. Previously, players had to wait until the ball touched either the rim or backboard before entering the lane.
- The time allotted to replace a disqualified (fouled out) player was reduced from 60 to 30 seconds.
- Conferences were allowed to experiment with the three-point shot in conference games only. The Southern Conference was the first to use the shot in their conference games, adopting a distance of 22 feet.

== Season headlines ==
- At 7:06 p.m. on November 29, 1980, Ronnie Carr of Western Carolina scored a 23-foot (7 m) field goal against Middle Tennessee State. Not counting shots made during a February 1945 game between Columbia and Fordham that experimented with the three-point field goal, Carr became the first player to score on a three-point shot. The three-pointer was used as an experiment by several conferences until the rule was adopted nationally for the 1986-87 season.
- After a nearly even first half, the Indiana Hoosiers pulled away from the North Carolina Tar Heels to clinch the school's fourth national championship, 63–50, in Philadelphia, Pennsylvania. The win marked Hoosiers head coach Bob Knight's second championship and marked North Carolina head coach Dean Smith's sixth trip to the Final Four without a championship. A dominant second half by sophomore Isiah Thomas led Indiana to the championship.
- The possibility of postponing or cancelling the March 30 NCAA championship game arose after an assassination attempt in which John Hinckley Jr., shot President Ronald Reagan that day in Washington, D.C. Once it was confirmed that Reagan would survive, the game was played as scheduled.
- The NCAA used the Rating Percentage Index (RPI), a computer ranking system, for the first time as an aid in evaluating teams for at-large selections and seeding in the NCAA tournament.
- Two No. 1 seeds (LSU and Virginia) advanced to the NCAA tournament Final Four for the first time.
- The NCAA tournament included a national third-place game — pitting the two teams that lost in the semifinals against one another — for the last time. The NCAA tournament had included a national third-place game since 1946.
- For the last time, the National Invitation Tournament (NIT) included a third-place game between the two teams that lost in the semifinals. The tournament had included a third-place game since the first NIT in 1938.
- The NCAA Final Four was held in Philadelphia and the Final Four logo included a depiction of the Liberty Bell. It was the first time that a Final Four logo incorporated an image specific to the Final Four venue.
- Oregon State senior Steve Johnson set an NCAA record for season field goal percentage with a .746 mark. Johnson graduated with the NCAA career field goal percentage record (.678)
- Nolan Richardson led Tulsa to a 15-game improvement over the previous year in his first year at the helm. The Golden Hurricane went 26–7 and won the 1981 National Invitation Tournament. Richardson came to Tulsa fresh off of a 1980 NJCAA Championship and brought four of his former Western Texas College starters to Tulsa, including Paul Pressey.

== Season outlook ==
=== Pre-season polls ===
The top 20 from the AP and UPI polls during the pre-season.

Associated Press
Ranking	Team
1	Kentucky (30)
2	DePaul (18)
3	Louisville (2)
4	Maryland (2)
5	Indiana (2)
6	UCLA (2)
7	Oregon State (1)
8	Virginia (1)
9	Ohio State (1)
10	Notre Dame
11	Missouri
12	Louisiana State
13	North Carolina
14	Iowa
15	Texas A&M
16	Georgetown
17	St. John's
18	Brigham Young
19	Syracuse
20	Arkansas

UPI Coaches
Ranking	Team
1	Kentucky
2	DePaul
3	Louisville
4	Indiana
5	Maryland
6	Oregon State
7	Virginia
8	UCLA
9	Ohio State
10	Missouri
11	North Carolina
12	Notre Dame
13	Louisiana State
14	Texas A&M
15	Iowa
16	Georgetown
17	Brigham Young
18	Kansas State
19	St. John's
20	Arizona State

== Conference membership changes ==
School	Former conference	New conference
Air Force Falcons	Division I independent	Western Athletic Conference
Akron Zips	Division II independent	Ohio Valley Conference
Arkansas-Little Rock Trojans	Division I independent	Trans America Athletic Conference
Bethune–Cookman Wildcats	SIAC (D-II)	Mid-Eastern Athletic Conference
Detroit Titans	Division I independent	Midwestern City Conference
Georgia Southern Eagles	Division I independent	Trans America Athletic Conference
Milwaukee Panthers	Division I independent	Division III independent
New Orleans Privateers	Sun Belt Conference	Division I independent
Nicholls State Colonels	Division II independent	Division I independent
Northern Iowa Panthers	Division II independent	Division I independent
Northwestern State Demons	Division I independent	Trans America Athletic Conference
Rhode Island Rams	ECAC North Conference	Eastern Athletic Association (Eastern 8)
Seattle Redhawks	West Coast Athletic Conference	NAIA independent
Southeastern Louisiana Lions	Division II independent	Division I independent
Texas–Pan American Broncs	Trans America Athletic Conference	Division I independent
Villanova Wildcats	Eastern Athletic Association (Eastern 8)	Big East Conference

== Regular season ==
=== Conferences ===
==== Conference winners and tournaments ====
Conference	Regular season winner	Conference player of the year	Conference tournament	Tournament venue (City)	Tournament winner
Atlantic Coast Conference	Virginia	Ralph Sampson, Virginia	1981 ACC men's basketball tournament	Capital Centre (Landover, Maryland)	North Carolina
Big East Conference	Boston College	John Bagley, Boston College	1981 Big East men's basketball tournament	Carrier Dome (Syracuse, New York)	Syracuse
Big Eight Conference	Missouri	Andre Smith, Nebraska	1981 Big Eight Conference men's basketball tournament	Kemper Arena (Kansas City, Missouri) (Semifinals and Finals)	Kansas
Big Sky Conference	Idaho	Brian Kellerman, Idaho	1981 Big Sky Conference men's basketball tournament	Kibbie Dome (Moscow, Idaho)	Idaho
Big Ten Conference	Indiana	None Selected	No Tournament		
East Coast Conference	American (East); Lafayette & Rider (West)	Len Hatzenbeller, Drexel	1981 East Coast Conference men's basketball tournament	The Palestra (Philadelphia)	St. Joseph's
Eastern Athletic Association (Eastern 8)	Duquesne & Rhode Island	Earl Belcher, St. Bonaventure	1981 Eastern 8 men's basketball tournament	Civic Arena (Pittsburgh)	Pittsburgh
Eastern College Athletic; Conference (ECAC)	Division I ECAC members played as independents during the regular season (see note)		1981 ECAC Metro Region tournament	Nassau Coliseum (Uniondale, New York)	LIU-Brooklyn
Eastern College Athletic; Conference (ECAC)	Division I ECAC members played as independents during the regular season (see note)		1981 ECAC South Region tournament	Hampton Coliseum (Hampton, Virginia)	James Madison
ECAC North	Northeastern	Mike Ferrara, Colgate	1981 ECAC North men's basketball tournament	Cabot Center (Boston)	Northeastern
Ivy League	Princeton	Larry Lawrence, Dartmouth	No Tournament		
Metro Conference	Louisville	David Burns, Saint Louis & Derek Smith, Louisville	1981 Metro Conference men's basketball tournament	Freedom Hall (Louisville, Kentucky)	Louisville
Mid-American Conference	Ball State, Northern Illinois, Toledo, W. Michigan & Bowling Green	Harvey Knuckles, Toledo	1981 MAC men's basketball tournament	Crisler Arena (Ann Arbor, Michigan)	Ball State
Mid-Eastern Athletic Conference	North Carolina A&T	Larry Spriggs, Howard	1981 MEAC men's basketball tournament	Winston–Salem Memorial Coliseum (Winston-Salem, North Carolina)	Howard
Midwestern City Conference	Xavier	Darius Clemons, Loyola (IL) & Rubin Jackson, Oklahoma City	1981 Midwestern City Conference men's basketball tournament	Final at Riverfront Coliseum (Cincinnati)	Oklahoma City
Missouri Valley Conference	Wichita State	Lewis Lloyd, Drake	1981 Missouri Valley Conference men's basketball tournament	Levitt Arena (Wichita, Kansas)	Creighton
Ohio Valley Conference	Western Kentucky	Jerry Beck, Middle Tennessee St.	1981 Ohio Valley Conference men's basketball tournament	E. A. Diddle Arena (Bowling Green, Kentucky)	Western Kentucky
Pacific-10 Conference	Oregon State	Steve Johnson, Oregon State	No Tournament		
Pacific Coast Athletic Association	Fresno State	Kevin Magee, UC Irvine	1981 Pacific Coast Athletic Association men's basketball tournament	Anaheim Convention Center (Anaheim, California)	Fresno State
Southeastern Conference	LSU	Rudy Macklin, LSU	1981 SEC men's basketball tournament	Birmingham Jefferson Convention Complex (Birmingham, Alabama)	Mississippi
Southern Conference	Appalachian State, Davidson & UT-Chattanooga	Charles Payton, Appalachian State	1981 Southern Conference men's basketball tournament	Roanoke Civic Center (Roanoke, Virginia)	UT-Chattanooga
Southland Conference	Lamar	Mike Olliver, Lamar	1981 Southland Conference men's basketball tournament	McDonald Gym (Beaumont, Texas) (Semifinals and finals)	Lamar
Southwest Conference	Arkansas	Rob Williams, Houston	1981 Southwest Conference men's basketball tournament	HemisFair Arena (San Antonio, Texas)	Houston
Southwestern Athletic Conference	Alcorn State & Southern-BR	Harry Kelly, Texas Southern & Robert Williams, Grambling State	1981 SWAC men's basketball tournament	LSU Assembly Center (Baton Rouge, Louisiana)	Southern-BR
Sun Belt Conference	VCU, South Alabama & UAB	Ed Rains, South Alabama	1981 Sun Belt Conference men's basketball tournament	Jacksonville Memorial Coliseum (Jacksonville, Florida)	VCU
Trans America Athletic Conference	Houston Baptist	Benton Wade, Mercer	1981 TAAC men's basketball tournament	Hirsch Coliseum (Shreveport, Louisiana)	Mercer
West Coast Athletic Conference	Pepperdine & San Francisco	Quintin Dailey, San Francisco	No Tournament		
Western Athletic Conference	Utah & Wyoming	Danny Ainge, BYU	No Tournament		

Note: From 1975 to 1981, the Eastern College Athletic Conference (ECAC), a loosely organized sports federation of colleges and universities in the Northeastern United States, organized Division I ECAC regional tournaments for those of its members that were independents in basketball. Each 1981 tournament winner received an automatic bid to the 1981 NCAA Division I men's basketball tournament in the same way that the tournament champions of conventional athletic conferences did. The ECAC North was a separate, conventional conference.

==== Conference standings ====
1980–81 ACC men's basketball standings
	Conf.				Overall
Team	W		L	PCT	W		L	PCT
No. 5 Virginia	13	–	1	.929	29	–	4	.879
No. 6 North Carolina †	10	–	4	.714	29	–	8	.784
No. 11 Wake Forest	9	–	5	.643	22	–	7	.759
No. 18 Maryland	8	–	6	.571	21	–	10	.677
Duke	6	–	8	.429	17	–	13	.567
Clemson	6	–	8	.429	20	–	11	.645
NC State	4	–	10	.286	14	–	13	.519
Georgia Tech	0	–	14	.000	4	–	23	.148
† 1981 ACC tournament winner Rankings from AP Poll

1980–81 Big East men's basketball standings
	Conf.				Overall
Team	W		L	PCT	W		L	PCT
Boston College	10	–	4	.714	23	–	7	.767
Georgetown	9	–	5	.643	20	–	12	.625
St. John's	8	–	6	.571	17	–	11	.607
Villanova	8	–	6	.571	20	–	11	.645
Connecticut	8	–	6	.571	20	–	9	.690
Syracuse †	6	–	8	.429	22	–	12	.647
Seton Hall	4	–	10	.286	11	–	16	.407
Providence	3	–	11	.214	10	–	18	.357
† 1981 Big East tournament winner Rankings from AP poll

1980–81 Big Eight Conference men's basketball standings
	Conf.				Overall
Team	W		L	PCT	W		L	PCT
Missouri	10	–	4	.714	22	–	10	.688
Kansas State	9	–	5	.643	24	–	9	.727
Nebraska	9	–	5	.643	15	–	12	.556
Kansas †	9	–	5	.643	24	–	8	.750
Oklahoma State	8	–	6	.571	18	–	9	.667
Colorado	5	–	9	.357	16	–	12	.571
Oklahoma	4	–	10	.286	9	–	18	.333
Iowa State	2	–	12	.143	9	–	18	.333
† 1981 Big Eight tournament winner Rankings from AP Poll

1980–81 Big Sky men's basketball standings
	Conf.				Overall
Team	W		L	PCT	W		L	PCT
Idaho †	12	–	2	.857	25	–	4	.862
Montana	11	–	3	.786	19	–	9	.679
Montana State	11	–	3	.786	16	–	11	.593
Idaho State	6	–	8	.429	12	–	14	.462
Nevada	5	–	9	.357	11	–	15	.423
Weber State	5	–	9	.357	8	–	19	.296
Boise State	4	–	10	.286	7	–	19	.269
Northern Arizona	2	–	12	.143	8	–	17	.320
† Big Sky Conference tournament winner

1980–81 Big Ten Conference men's basketball standings
	Conf.				Overall
Team	W		L	PCT	W		L	PCT
No. 9 Indiana	14	–	4	.778	26	–	9	.743
No. 13 Iowa	13	–	5	.722	21	–	7	.750
No. 19 Illinois	12	–	6	.667	21	–	8	.724
Purdue	10	–	8	.556	21	–	11	.656
Minnesota	9	–	9	.500	19	–	11	.633
Ohio State	9	–	9	.500	14	–	13	.519
Michigan	8	–	10	.444	19	–	11	.633
Michigan State	7	–	11	.389	13	–	14	.481
Wisconsin	5	–	13	.278	11	–	16	.407
Northwestern	3	–	15	.167	9	–	18	.333
Rankings from AP Poll

1980–81 ECAC North men's basketball standings
	Conf.				Overall
Team	W		L	PCT	W		L	PCT
Northeastern †	21	–	5	.808	24	–	6	.800
Holy Cross	18	–	8	.692	20	–	10	.667
Vermont	15	–	11	.577	16	–	12	.571
Maine	13	–	13	.500	14	–	14	.500
Boston University	13	–	13	.500	13	–	14	.481
Canisius	11	–	15	.423	11	–	15	.423
Niagara	11	–	15	.423	11	–	15	.423
Colgate	11	–	17	.393	11	–	18	.379
New Hampshire	3	–	7	.300	7	–	19	.269
† 1981 ECAC North tournament winner

1980–81 ECC men's basketball standings
	Conf.				Overall
Team	W		L	PCT	W		L	PCT
East
American	11	–	0	1.000	24	–	6	.800
Saint Joseph's †	9	–	2	.818	25	–	8	.758
Temple	9	–	2	.818	20	–	8	.714
La Salle	8	–	3	.727	14	–	13	.519
Drexel	6	–	5	.545	14	–	13	.519
Hofstra	5	–	6	.455	12	–	15	.444
West
Lafayette	8	–	8	.500	15	–	13	.536
Rider	8	–	8	.500	14	–	14	.500
Bucknell	6	–	10	.375	12	–	16	.429
Lehigh	6	–	10	.375	14	–	12	.538
Delaware	3	–	13	.188	6	–	19	.240
West Chester	2	–	14	.125	7	–	20	.259
† 1981 ECC tournament winner Rankings from AP poll

1980–81 Eastern 8 men's basketball standings
	Conf.				Overall
Team	W		L	PCT	W		L	PCT
Rhode Island	10	–	3	.769	21	–	8	.724
Duquesne	10	–	3	.769	20	–	10	.667
West Virginia	9	–	4	.692	23	–	10	.697
Pittsburgh †	8	–	5	.615	19	–	12	.613
Rutgers	7	–	6	.538	16	–	14	.533
St. Bonaventure	6	–	7	.462	14	–	13	.519
George Washington	4	–	9	.308	8	–	19	.296
UMass	0	–	13	.000	3	–	24	.111
† 1981 Eastern 8 Tournament winner Rankings from AP Poll

1980–81 Ivy League men's basketball standings
	Conf.				Overall
Team	W		L	PCT	W		L	PCT
Princeton	13	–	1	.929	18	–	10	.643
Penn	13	–	1	.929	20	–	8	.714
Harvard	9	–	5	.643	16	–	10	.615
Brown	5	–	9	.357	9	–	17	.346
Columbia	5	–	9	.357	9	–	17	.346
Cornell	4	–	10	.286	7	–	19	.269
Yale	4	–	10	.286	7	–	19	.269
Dartmouth	3	–	11	.214	10	–	16	.385
Rankings from AP Poll

1980–81 Metro Conference men's basketball standings
	Conf.				Overall
Team	W		L	PCT	W		L	PCT
No. 12 Louisville †	11	–	1	.917	21	–	9	.700
Florida State	7	–	5	.583	17	–	11	.607
Cincinnati	6	–	6	.500	16	–	13	.552
Virginia Tech	6	–	6	.500	15	–	13	.536
Memphis State	5	–	7	.417	13	–	14	.481
Tulane	4	–	8	.333	12	–	15	.444
Saint Louis	3	–	9	.250	9	–	18	.333
† 1981 Metro Conference tournament winner Rankings from AP Poll

1980–81 Mid-American Conference men's basketball standings
	Conf.				Overall
Team	W		L	PCT	W		L	PCT
Western Michigan	10	–	6	.625	15	–	13	.536
Ball State †	10	–	6	.625	20	–	10	.667
Toledo	10	–	6	.625	21	–	10	.677
Bowling Green	10	–	6	.625	15	–	12	.556
Northern Illinois	10	–	6	.625	17	–	12	.586
Eastern Michigan	8	–	8	.500	13	–	14	.481
Ohio	6	–	10	.375	7	–	20	.259
Miami	6	–	10	.375	11	–	15	.423
Central Michigan	5	–	11	.313	12	–	14	.462
Kent State	5	–	11	.313	7	–	19	.269
† 1981 MAC tournament winner Rankings from AP Poll

1980–81 MEAC men's basketball standings
	Conf.				Overall
Team	W		L	PCT	W		L	PCT
North Carolina A&T	7	–	3	.700	21	–	8	.724
Florida A&M	6	–	4	.600	17	–	11	.607
Howard †	6	–	4	.600	17	–	12	.586
Bethune–Cookman	4	–	6	.400	13	–	15	.464
South Carolina State	4	–	6	.400	11	–	15	.423
Delaware State	3	–	7	.300	8	–	18	.308
† 1981 MEAC tournament winner Rankings from AP Poll

1980–81 Midwestern City Conference men's basketball standings
	Conf.				Overall
Team	W		L	PCT	W		L	PCT
Xavier	8	–	3	.727	12	–	16	.429
Loyola-Chicago	7	–	4	.636	13	–	15	.464
Oklahoma City †	7	–	4	.636	14	–	15	.483
Oral Roberts	6	–	5	.545	11	–	16	.407
Evansville	6	–	5	.545	19	–	9	.679
Detroit	1	–	5	.167	9	–	18	.333
Butler	1	–	10	.091	5	–	22	.185
† 1981 MCC tournament winner

1980–81 Missouri Valley Conference men's basketball standings
	Conf.				Overall
Team	W		L	PCT	W		L	PCT
Wichita State	12	–	4	.750	26	–	7	.788
Creighton †	11	–	5	.688	21	–	9	.700
Tulsa	11	–	5	.688	26	–	7	.788
Drake	10	–	6	.625	18	–	11	.621
Bradley	10	–	6	.625	18	–	9	.667
New Mexico State	7	–	9	.438	10	–	17	.370
West Texas State	7	–	9	.438	16	–	11	.593
Indiana State	4	–	12	.250	9	–	18	.333
Southern Illinois	0	–	16	.000	7	–	20	.259
† 1981 MVC tournament winner Rankings from AP poll

1980–81 Ohio Valley Conference men's basketball standings
	Conf.				Overall
Team	W		L	PCT	W		L	PCT
Western Kentucky †	12	–	2	.857	21	–	8	.724
Murray State	10	–	4	.714	17	–	10	.630
Middle Tennessee	9	–	5	.643	18	–	9	.667
Austin Peay	7	–	7	.500	14	–	13	.519
Eastern Kentucky	7	–	7	.500	10	–	16	.385
Akron	5	–	9	.357	8	–	18	.308
Morehead State	4	–	10	.286	11	–	15	.423
Tennessee Tech	2	–	12	.143	6	–	20	.231
† 1981 OVC tournament winner Rankings from AP poll

1980–81 Pacific-10 Conference men's basketball standings
	Conf.				Overall
Team	W		L	PCT	W		L	PCT
No. 2 Oregon State	17	–	1	.944	26	–	2	.929
No. 3 Arizona State	16	–	2	.889	24	–	4	.857
No. 10 UCLA	13	–	5	.722	20	–	7	.741
USC	9	–	9	.500	14	–	13	.519
Washington	8	–	10	.444	14	–	13	.519
Arizona	8	–	10	.444	13	–	14	.481
Oregon	6	–	12	.333	13	–	14	.481
California	5	–	13	.278	13	–	14	.481
Stanford	5	–	13	.278	9	–	18	.333
Washington State	3	–	15	.167	10	–	17	.370
Rankings from AP Poll

1980–81 Pacific Coast Athletic Association men's basketball standings
	Conf.				Overall
Team	W		L	PCT	W		L	PCT
Fresno State†	12	–	2	.857	25	–	4	.862
San Jose State	10	–	4	.714	21	–	9	.700
UC Irvine	9	–	5	.643	17	–	10	.630
Long Beach State	9	–	5	.643	15	–	13	.536
Utah State	5	–	9	.357	12	–	16	.429
UC Santa Barbara	5	–	9	.357	11	–	16	.407
Pacific	4	–	10	.286	14	–	13	.519
Cal State Fullerton	2	–	12	.143	4	–	23	.148
† 1981 PCAA tournament winner

1980–81 Southeastern Conference men's basketball standings
	Conf.				Overall
Team	W		L	PCT	W		L	PCT
No. 4 LSU	17	–	1	.944	31	–	5	.861
No. 8 Kentucky	15	–	3	.833	22	–	6	.786
No. 15 Tennessee	12	–	6	.667	21	–	8	.724
Alabama	10	–	8	.556	18	–	11	.621
Georgia	9	–	9	.500	19	–	12	.613
Ole Miss †	8	–	10	.444	16	–	14	.533
Vanderbilt	7	–	11	.389	15	–	14	.517
Florida	5	–	13	.278	12	–	16	.429
Auburn	4	–	14	.222	11	–	16	.407
Mississippi State	3	–	15	.167	8	–	19	.296
† 1981 SEC tournament winner Rankings from AP Poll

1980–81 Southern Conference men's basketball standings
	Conf.				Overall
Team	W		L	PCT	W		L	PCT
Chattanooga †	11	–	5	.688	21	–	9	.700
Davidson	11	–	5	.688	13	–	14	.481
Appalachian State	11	–	5	.688	20	–	9	.690
East Tennessee State	9	–	7	.563	13	–	14	.481
Western Carolina	9	–	7	.563	18	–	10	.643
Furman	8	–	8	.500	11	–	16	.407
Marshall	8	–	8	.500	18	–	10	.643
VMI	3	–	13	.188	4	–	23	.148
The Citadel	2	–	14	.125	9	–	17	.346
† 1981 Southern Conference Tournament winner Rankings from AP poll

1980–81 Southland Conference men's basketball standings
	Conf.				Overall
Team	W		L	PCT	W		L	PCT
Lamar †	8	–	2	.800	25	–	5	.833
Texas-Arlington	7	–	3	.700	20	–	8	.714
Louisiana Tech	7	–	3	.700	20	–	10	.667
Southwestern Louisiana	6	–	4	.600	15	–	13	.536
Arkansas State	2	–	8	.200	12	–	15	.444
McNeese State	0	–	10	.000	11	–	21	.344
† Southland Tournament winner Rankings from AP poll

1980–81 Southwest Conference men's basketball standings
	Conf.				Overall
Team	W		L	PCT	W		L	PCT
No. 20 Arkansas	13	–	3	.813	24	–	8	.750
Houston †	10	–	6	.625	21	–	9	.700
Baylor	10	–	6	.625	15	–	12	.556
Texas Tech	8	–	8	.500	15	–	13	.536
Texas A&M	8	–	8	.500	15	–	12	.556
Texas	7	–	9	.438	15	–	15	.500
Rice	7	–	9	.438	12	–	15	.444
TCU	6	–	10	.375	11	–	18	.379
SMU	3	–	13	.188	7	–	20	.259
† 1981 SWC tournament winner Rankings from AP poll

1980–81 SWAC men's basketball standings
	Conf.				Overall
Team	W		L	PCT	W		L	PCT
Southern †	8	–	4	.667	17	–	11	.607
Alcorn State	8	–	4	.667	17	–	12	.586
Grambling State	7	–	5	.583	18	–	11	.621
Jackson State	7	–	5	.583	16	–	13	.552
Texas Southern	7	–	5	.583	13	–	13	.500
Mississippi Valley State	4	–	8	.333	11	–	16	.407
Prairie View	1	–	11	.083	2	–	23	.080
† 1981 SWAC tournament winner Rankings from AP Poll

1980–81 Sun Belt Conference men's basketball standings
	Conf.				Overall
Team	W		L	PCT	W		L	PCT
VCU †	9	–	3	.750	24	–	5	.828
South Alabama	9	–	3	.750	25	–	6	.806
UAB	9	–	3	.750	23	–	9	.719
South Florida	7	–	5	.583	18	–	11	.621
Jacksonville	4	–	8	.333	8	–	19	.296
UNC Charlotte	3	–	9	.250	10	–	17	.370
Georgia State	1	–	11	.083	4	–	23	.148
† 1981 Sun Belt Conference tournament winner Rankings from AP Poll

1980–81 Trans America Athletic Conference men's basketball standings
	Conf.				Overall
Team	W		L	PCT	W		L	PCT
Houston Baptist	9	–	3	.750	18	–	10	.643
NE Louisiana	8	–	4	.667	15	–	13	.536
Mercer †	7	–	4	.636	18	–	12	.600
Centenary	7	–	5	.583	16	–	12	.571
Arkansas–Little Rock	5	–	6	.455	13	–	13	.500
Samford	5	–	6	.455	10	–	17	.370
Northwestern State	5	–	7	.417	11	–	17	.393
Hardin-Simmons	4	–	8	.333	9	–	18	.333
Georgia Southern	2	–	9	.182	5	–	22	.185
† 1981 TAAC tournament winner Rankings from AP Poll

1980–81 West Coast Athletic Conference men's basketball standings
	Conf.				Overall
Team	W		L	PCT	W		L	PCT
San Francisco	11	–	3	.786	23	–	7	.767
Pepperdine	11	–	3	.786	16	–	11	.593
Gonzaga	9	–	5	.643	19	–	8	.704
Portland	7	–	7	.500	17	–	10	.630
Santa Clara	7	–	7	.500	14	–	13	.519
Loyola Marymount	5	–	9	.357	9	–	19	.321
San Diego	3	–	11	.214	10	–	16	.385
Saint Mary's	3	–	11	.214	9	–	18	.333
Rankings from AP Poll

1980–81 WAC men's basketball standings
	Conf.				Overall
Team	W		L	PCT	W		L	PCT
No. 14 Utah	13	–	3	.813	25	–	5	.833
No. 17 Wyoming	13	–	3	.813	24	–	6	.800
No. 16 BYU	12	–	4	.750	25	–	7	.781
UTEP	9	–	7	.563	18	–	12	.600
San Diego State	8	–	8	.500	15	–	12	.556
Hawaii	7	–	9	.438	14	–	13	.519
New Mexico	6	–	10	.375	11	–	15	.423
Air Force	3	–	13	.188	9	–	18	.333
Colorado State	1	–	15	.063	3	–	24	.111
Rankings from AP Poll

=== Division I independents ===
A total of 46 college teams played as Division I independents. Among them, DePaul (27–2) had both the best winning percentage (.931) and the most wins.

1980–81 NCAA Division I men's basketball independents standings
	Conf.				Overall
Team	W		L	PCT	W		L	PCT
No. 1 DePaul		–		–	27	–	2	.931
No. 7 Notre Dame		–		–	23	–	6	.793
Southern Miss		–		–	20	–	7	.741
James Madison		–		–	21	–	9	.700
Fordham		–		–	19	–	9	.679
Cleveland State		–		–	18	–	9	.667
Stetson		–		–	18	–	9	.667
Saint Peter's		–		–	17	–	9	.654
Tennessee State		–		–	17	–	9	.654
Marquette		–		–	20	–	11	.645
Old Dominion		–		–	18	–	10	.643
Penn State		–		–	17	–	10	.630
St. Francis (Pa.)		–		–	17	–	10	.630
Siena		–		–	17	–	10	.630
South Carolina		–		–	17	–	10	.630
Dayton		–		–	18	–	11	.621
Long Island		–		–	18	–	11	.621
Texas–Pan American		–		–	18	–	11	.621
Illinois State		–		–	16	–	11	.593
Wagner		–		–	16	–	11	.593
UNLV		–		–	16	–	12	.571
William & Mary		–		–	16	–	12	.571
North Texas State		–		–	15	–	12	.556
Southeastern Louisiana		–		–	14	–	13	.519
Iona		–		–	15	–	14	.517
Richmond		–		–	15	–	14	.517
Fairfield		–		–	13	–	13	.500
UNC Wilmington		–		–	13	–	13	.500
New Orleans		–		–	13	–	14	.481
Towson State		–		–	13	–	14	.481
East Carolina		–		–	12	–	14	.462
Fairleigh Dickinson		–		–	12	–	14	.462
Valparaiso		–		–	12	–	15	.444
Campbell		–		–	11	–	16	.407
George Mason		–		–	10	–	16	.385
St. Francis (N.Y.)		–		–	10	–	16	.385
Navy		–		–	9	–	16	.360
Robert Morris		–		–	9	–	18	.333
Baptist		–		–	8	–	19	.296
Northern Iowa		–		–	8	–	19	.296
Army		–		–	7	–	19	.269
Portland State		–		–	7	–	20	.259
Manhattan		–		–	6	–	20	.231
Nicholls State		–		–	6	–	22	.214
Baltimore		–		–	5	–	21	.192
Catholic		–		–	4	–	20	.167
Rankings from AP Poll

=== Informal championships ===
Conference	Regular season winner	Most Valuable Player
Philadelphia Big 5	La Salle, Penn, Saint Joseph's, Temple, & Villanova	John Pinone, Villanova

All five teams finished with a 2–2 record in head-to-head competition among the Philadelphia Big 5.

=== Statistical leaders ===
Points per game			Rebounds per game			Field-goal percentage			Free-throw percentage		
Player	School	PPG	Player	School	RPG	Player	School	FG%	Player	School	FT%
Zam Fredrick	S. Carolina	28.9	Darryl Watson	Miss. Valley St.	14.0	Steve Johnson	Oregon St.	74.6	Dave Hidahl	Portland St.	92.7
Mike Ferrara	Colgate	28.6	Wayne Sappleton	Loyola (IL)	13.4	Kevin Magee	UC Irvine	67.1	Jack Moore	Nebraska	92.2
Kevin Magee	UC Irvine	27.5	Michael Cage	San Diego St.	13.1	Orlando Woolridge	Notre Dame	65.0	Steve Bontrager	Oral Roberts	90.1
Lewis Lloyd	Drake	26.3	Kevin Magee	UC Irvine	12.5	Buck Williams	Maryland	64.7	Jim Stack	Northwestern	90.0
Rob Williams	Houston	25.0	LaSalle Thompson	Texas	12.3	Thomas Best	Lafayette	64.3	John Leonard	Manhattan	89.1

== Post-season tournaments ==
=== NCAA tournament ===
Indiana won its fourth NCAA title with a 63–50 win over North Carolina and coach Dean Smith. Precocious sophomore Isiah Thomas was named Final Four Most Outstanding Player in a title game delayed due to the shooting of President Ronald Reagan.

==== Final Four ====
Played at The Spectrum in Philadelphia

National semifinals
E1	Virginia	65
W2	North Carolina	78
ME3	Indiana	67
MW1	LSU	49

National finals
W2	North Carolina	50
ME3	Indiana	63
Third place
E1	Virginia	78
MW1	LSU	74

=== National Invitation tournament ===
Coach Nolan Richardson led Tulsa to the NIT Championship in his first year as a Division I head coach – an 86–84 win over Syracuse. The Golden Hurricane's Greg Stewart was named the tournament's Most Valuable Player.

==== NIT Semifinals and Finals ====
Played at Madison Square Garden in New York City

Semifinals
Syracuse	70
Purdue	63
West Virginia	87
Tulsa	89

Finals
Syracuse	84
Tulsa	86
Third place
Purdue	75
West Virginia	72

== Awards ==
=== Consensus All-American teams ===
Consensus First Team
Player	Position	Class	Team
Mark Aguirre	F	Junior	DePaul
Danny Ainge	G	Senior	Brigham Young
Steve Johnson	C	Senior	Oregon State
Ralph Sampson	C	Sophomore	Virginia
Isiah Thomas	G	Sophomore	Indiana

Consensus Second Team
Player	Position	Class	Team
Sam Bowie	C	Sophomore	Kentucky
Jeff Lamp	F	Senior	Virginia
Durand Macklin	F	Senior	LSU
Kelly Tripucka	F	Senior	Notre Dame
Danny Vranes	F	Senior	Utah
Al Wood	F	Senior	North Carolina

=== Major player of the year awards ===
- Wooden Award: Danny Ainge, BYU
- Naismith Award: Ralph Sampson, Virginia
- Helms Player of the Year: Mark Aguirre, DePaul
- Associated Press Player of the Year: Ralph Sampson, Virginia
- UPI Player of the Year: Ralph Sampson, Virginia
- NABC Player of the Year: Danny Ainge, BYU
- Oscar Robertson Trophy (USBWA): Ralph Sampson, Virginia
- Adolph Rupp Trophy: Ralph Sampson, Virginia
- Sporting News Player of the Year: Mark Aguirre, DePaul

=== Major coach of the year awards ===
- Associated Press Coach of the Year: Ralph Miller, Oregon State
- Henry Iba Award (USBWA): Ralph Miller, Oregon State
- NABC Coach of the Year: Jack Hartman, Kansas State & Ralph Miller, Oregon State
- UPI Coach of the Year: Ralph Miller, Oregon State
- CBS/Chevrolet Coach of the Year: Dale Brown, LSU
- Sporting News Coach of the Year: Dale Brown, LSU

=== Other major awards ===
- Frances Pomeroy Naismith Award (Best player under 6'0): Terry Adolph, West Texas State
- Robert V. Geasey Trophy (Top player in Philadelphia Big 5): John Pinone, Villanova
- NIT/Haggerty Award (Top player in New York City metro area): Gary Springer, Iona

== Coaching changes ==
A number of teams changed coaches during the season and after it ended.

Team	Former Coach	Interim Coach	New Coach	Reason
Appalachian State	Bobby Cremins		Kevin Cantwell	
Brown	Joe Mullaney		Mike Cingiser	Mullaney left to coach Providence.
Colorado	Bill Blair		Tom Apke	Blair left to join the New Jersey Nets coaching staff.
Creighton	Tom Apke		Willis Reed	Apke left to coach Colorado.
Davidson	Eddie Biedenbach		Bobby Hussey	
Drake	Bob Ortegel		Gary Garner	
Eastern Kentucky	Ed Byhre		Max Good	
Fairfield	Fred Barakat		Terry O'Connor	
George Washington	Bob Tallent		Gerry Gimelstob	
Georgia Southern	John Nelson		Frank Kerns	
Georgia State	Roger Couch		Jim Jarrett	
Georgia Tech	Dwane Morrison		Bobby Cremins	
Gonzaga	Dan Fitzgerald		Jay Hillock	
Hardin–Simmons	Jim Shuler		Jim Hatfield	
Jacksonville	Tates Locke		Bob Wenzel	
Manhattan	Brian Mahoney		Gordon Chiesa	
Mississippi State	Jim Hatfield		Bob Boyd	
Nicholls State	Jerry Sanders		Gordon C. Stauffer	
NE Louisiana	Benny Hollis		Mike Vining	
Northern Arizona	Joedy Gardner		Gene Visscher	
Providence	Gary Walters		Joe Mullaney	
Rice	Mike Schuler		Tommy Suitts	
Richmond	Lou Goetz		Dick Tarrant	
Saint Joseph's	Jim Lynam		Jim Boyle	
Samford	Cliff Wettig		Mike Hanks	
Seton Hall	Bill Raftery		Hoddy Mahon	
Southern Illinois	Joe Gottfried		Allen Van Winkle	
Tulane	Roy Danforth		Ned Fowler	
UCLA	Larry Brown		Larry Farmer	
UMass	Ray Wilson		Tom McLaughlin	
Vanderbilt	Richard Schmidt		C. M. Newton	
Vermont	Peter Salzberg		Bill Whitmore	
