= 1980–81 Michigan Wolverines men's basketball team =

American college basketball season

1980–81 Michigan Wolverines men's basketball

NIT, Quarterfinals
- Conference: Big Ten Conference
- Record: 19–11 (8–10 Big Ten)
- Head coach: Bill Frieder
- Assistant coaches: Mike Boyd; Tom Kempf; Don Sicko
- MVP: Mike McGee
- Captains: Paul Heuerman; Thad Garner
- Home arena: Crisler Arena

1980–81 Big Ten Conference men's basketball standings
	Conf.				Overall
Team	W		L	PCT	W		L	PCT
No. 9 Indiana	14	–	4	.778	26	–	9	.743
No. 13 Iowa	13	–	5	.722	21	–	7	.750
No. 19 Illinois	12	–	6	.667	21	–	8	.724
Purdue	10	–	8	.556	21	–	11	.656
Minnesota	9	–	9	.500	19	–	11	.633
Ohio State	9	–	9	.500	14	–	13	.519
Michigan	8	–	10	.444	19	–	11	.633
Michigan State	7	–	11	.389	13	–	14	.481
Wisconsin	5	–	13	.278	11	–	16	.407
Northwestern	3	–	15	.167	9	–	18	.333
Rankings from AP Poll

The 1980–81 Michigan Wolverines men's basketball team represented the University of Michigan in intercollegiate college basketball during the 1980–81 NCAA Division I men's basketball season. The team played its home games in the Crisler Arena in Ann Arbor, Michigan, and was a member of the Big Ten Conference. Under the direction of first-year head coach Bill Frieder, the team finished tied for sixth in the Big Ten Conference. The team earned an invitation to the 1981 National Invitation Tournament. Although the team was ranked in the Associated Press Top Twenty Poll for eleven of the sixteen weeks reaching a peak at number nine, it began and finished the season unranked and it also ended the season unranked in the final UPI Coaches' Poll. The team was led by All-American Mike McGee. The team set the current Big Ten conference record by playing in six overtime games. That season McGee also set the current conference record for career field goals attempted (2077). McGee set several other records, which have since been broken: career points (2439, broken in 1989 by Glen Rice), career points (conference games only) (1503, broken in 1995), single-season field goals made (309, broken in 1986) and career field goals made (1010, broken in 1993). Mark Bodnar became the first Michigan Wolverines player on record to total 13 assists in a game on December 13, 1980, against the Dayton Flyers, eclipsing Mark Henry's 1970 total of 12. No Wolverine would surpass 13 assists in a game until Gary Grant twice recorded 14 in December 1987. The team's field goal percentage of 51.1 was a school record that lasted four years. McGee's 3941 minutes and 34.3 minutes per game stood as school records until 1987 and 1984 respectively. Marty Bodnar earned first team Academic All-American honors, while Mark Bodnar was a third team selection. Paul Heuerman and Thad Garner served as team captains, while McGee earned team MVP. McGee ended his career with a school record 112 starts. The record would last for six years.

In the 32-team National Invitation Tournament, Michigan advanced to the elite eight round by defeating the Duquesne Dukes 74–58 and Toledo Rockets 80–68 before losing to Syracuse Orange 91–76.

== Roster ==
1980–81 Michigan Wolverines men's basketball team
Players
Coaches

Pos.	#	Name	Height	Weight	Year	Hometown
G	30	Mark Bodnar	6 ft 3 in (1.91 m)	175 lb (79 kg)	Sr	Barberton, Ohio
G	24	Martin Bodnar	6 ft 3 in (1.91 m)	175 lb (79 kg)	Sr	Barberton, Ohio
F	15	Paul Heuerman	6 ft 8 in (2.03 m)	200 lb (91 kg)	Sr	Akron, Ohio
F	42	Joe James	6 ft 5 in (1.96 m)	195 lb (88 kg)	So	Youngstown, Ohio
G	34	Johnny Johnson	6 ft 4 in (1.93 m)	200 lb (91 kg)	Sr	Buffalo, New York
C	44	Tim McCormick	6 ft 10 in (2.08 m)	230 lb (104 kg)	Fr	Clarkston, Michigan
F	40	Mike McGee	6 ft 6 in (1.98 m)	200 lb (91 kg)	Sr	Omaha, Nebraska

Head coach

- Johnny Orr

Assistant coach(es)

- Mike Boyd
- Tom Kempf
- Don Sicko

Legend

- (C) Team captain
- (S) Suspended
- (I) Ineligible
- (W) Walk-on
- Injured
- Current redshirt

== Schedule and results ==
Date time, TV	Rank^{#}	Opponent^{#}	Result	Record	Site city, state
Regular Season
November 29, 1980*		Eastern Michigan	W 74–68	1–0	Crisler Arena; Ann Arbor, Michigan
December 3, 1980*		at Kansas	W 64–61	2–0	Allen Fieldhouse; Lawrence, Kansas
December 6, 1980*		No. 11 Arkansas	W 78–65	3–0	Crisler Arena; Ann Arbor, Michigan
December 8, 1980*	No. 18	Akron	W 98–69	4–0	Crisler Arena; Ann Arbor, Michigan
December 10, 1980*	No. 18	Kent State	W 97–72	5–0	Crisler Arena; Ann Arbor, Michigan
December 13, 1980*	No. 18	at Dayton	W 85–84	6–0	University of Dayton Arena; Dayton, Ohio
December 20, 1980*	No. 15	Western Michigan	W 102–73	7–0	Crisler Arena; Ann Arbor, Michigan
December 30, 1980*	No. 12	at Detroit Mercy	W 85–68	8–0	Calihan Hall; Detroit, Michigan
January 5, 1981	No. 10	at Purdue	L 74–81	8–1 (0–1)	Mackey Arena; West Lafayette, Indiana
January 10, 1981	No. 10	at No. 19 Minnesota	W 68–67	9–1 (1–1)	Williams Arena; Minneapolis, Minnesota
January 15, 1981	No. 9	Indiana	W 55–52 ^{OT}	10–1 (2–1)	Crisler Arena; Ann Arbor, Michigan
January 17, 1981	No. 9	No. 14 Iowa	L 58–73	10–2 (2–2)	Crisler Arena; Ann Arbor, Michigan
January 22, 1981	No. 16	No. 15 Illinois	W 80–76	11–2 (3–2)	Crisler Arena; Ann Arbor, Michigan
January 24, 1981	No. 16	at Ohio State	L 63–69	11–3 (3–3)	St. John Arena; Columbus, Ohio
January 26, 1981	No. 17	at Northwestern	W 77–52	12–3 (4–3)	Welsh-Ryan Arena; Evanston, Illinois
January 31, 1981	No. 17	at Wisconsin	W 74–67	13–3 (5–3)	Wisconsin Field House; Madison, Wisconsin
February 5, 1981	No. 14	Michigan State	W 79–77	14–3 (6–3)	Crisler Arena; Ann Arbor, Michigan
February 7, 1981	No. 14	Wisconsin	W 71–64	15–3 (7–3)	Crisler Arena; Ann Arbor, Michigan
February 12, 1981	No. 13	Ohio State	L 87–105	15–4 (7–4)	Crisler Arena; Ann Arbor, Michigan
February 14, 1981	No. 13	at Michigan State	L 66–70	15–5 (7–5)	Jenison Fieldhouse; East Lansing, Michigan
February 19, 1981	No. 18	at No. 15 Illinois	L 64–67	15–6 (7–6)	Assembly Hall; Champaign, Illinois
February 21, 1981	No. 18	Northwestern	L 70–74	15–7 (7–7)	Crisler Arena; Ann Arbor, Michigan
February 26, 1981		at No. 8 Iowa	L 66–69	15–8 (7–8)	Iowa Field House; Iowa City, Iowa
February 28, 1981		at No. 18 Indiana	L 83–98	15–9 (7–9)	Assembly Hall; Bloomington, Indiana
March 5, 1981		Minnesota	W 83–67	16–9 (8–9)	Crisler Arena; Ann Arbor, Michigan
March 7, 1981		Purdue	L 61–67	16–10 (8–10)	Crisler Arena; Ann Arbor, Michigan
NIT
March 12, 1981*		Duquesne; First Round	W 74–58	17–10	Crisler Arena; Ann Arbor, Michigan
March 15, 1981*		Toledo; Second Round	W 80–68	18–10	Crisler Arena; Ann Arbor, Michigan
March 19, 1981*		at Syracuse; Quarterfinals	L 76–91	18–11	Carrier Dome; Syracuse, New York
*Non-conference game. ^{#}Rankings from AP poll. (#) Tournament seedings in parentheses. SE=Southeast.

== Rankings ==
Ranking movements Legend: ██ Increase in ranking ██ Decrease in ranking
	Week															
Poll	Pre	1	2	3	4	5	6	7	8	9	10	11	12	13	14	Final
AP Poll			18	15	13	12	10	9	16	17	14	13	18			

== See also ==
- NIT all-time team records
- NIT bids by school and conference
- NIT championships and semifinal appearances

== Team players drafted into the NBA ==
Seven players from this team were selected in the NBA draft.

Year	Round	Pick	Overall	Player	NBA Club
1981	1	19	19	Mike McGee	Los Angeles Lakers
1981	3	23	69	John Johnson	Boston Celtics
1981	5	20	112	Paul Heuerman	Phoenix Suns
1982	7	3	141	Thad Gardner	Utah Jazz
1983	10	7	213	Ike Person	Detroit Pistons
1984	1	12	12	Tim McCormick	Cleveland Cavaliers
1984	10	19	225	Dan Pelekoudas	Detroit Pistons
