= 1980–81 Michigan State Spartans men's basketball team =

American college basketball season

1980–81 Michigan State Spartans men's basketball
- Conference: Big Ten Conference
- Record: 13–14 (7–11 Big Ten)
- Head coach: Jud Heathcote (5th season)
- Assistant coaches: Dave Harshman; Edgar Wilson; John Holms
- Captains: Mike Brkovich; Jay Vincent
- Home arena: Jenison Field House

1980–81 Big Ten Conference men's basketball standings
	Conf.				Overall
Team	W		L	PCT	W		L	PCT
No. 9 Indiana	14	–	4	.778	26	–	9	.743
No. 13 Iowa	13	–	5	.722	21	–	7	.750
No. 19 Illinois	12	–	6	.667	21	–	8	.724
Purdue	10	–	8	.556	21	–	11	.656
Minnesota	9	–	9	.500	19	–	11	.633
Ohio State	9	–	9	.500	14	–	13	.519
Michigan	8	–	10	.444	19	–	11	.633
Michigan State	7	–	11	.389	13	–	14	.481
Wisconsin	5	–	13	.278	11	–	16	.407
Northwestern	3	–	15	.167	9	–	18	.333
Rankings from AP Poll

The 1980–81 Michigan State Spartans men's basketball team represented Michigan State University in the 1980–81 NCAA Division I men's basketball season. The team played their home games at Jenison Field House in East Lansing, Michigan and were members of the Big Ten Conference. They were coached by Jud Heathcote in his fifth year at Michigan State. The Spartans finished with a record of 13–14, 7–11 to finish in eighth place in Big Ten play.

== Previous season ==
The Spartans finished the 1979–80 season 12–15, 6–12 in Big Ten play to finish in ninth place in conference.

== Roster and statistics ==
1980–81 Michigan State Spartans men's basketball team
No	Name	Pos	Year	Height	Pts	Reb	Ast
5	Kevin Smith	G	JR	6–2	13.5	2.3	4.8
10	Tim Gore	G	FR	6–4	1.1	0.8	0.3
12	Mike Brkovich	G	SR	6–5	8.2	2.2	2.4
15	Bob Fossum	G	FR	5–9	0.2	0.2	0.2
20	Ben Tower	F	FR	6–8	5.0	3.8	0.7
22	Bill Cawood	G	SO	6–7	0.8	0.5	0.2
23	Randy Morrison	G	FR	6–2	3.4	1.1	1.6
24	Richard Mudd	F	FR	6–9	0.0	1.5	0.0
30	Kurt James	F	SR	6–7			
31	Jay Vincent	F/C	SR	6–8	22.6	8.5	1.9
41	Derek Perry	F	SO	6–6	7.5	3.9	0.7
42	Richard Kaye	F	SR	6–6	3.3	1.8	0.4
44	Herb Bostic	F/G	SO	6–4	2.4	1.0	0.7
45	Kevin Radelet	G	JR	5–11	0.2	0.0	0.0
45	George Cooper				2.7	0.3	0.0
52	Steve Bates	C	JR	6–10	0.6	0.7	0.0

== Schedule and results ==
Date time, TV	Rank^{#}	Opponent^{#}	Result	Record	Site city, state
Non-conference regular season
Nov 28, 1980*		Western Michigan; Spartan Cutlass Classic semifinal	W 89–77	1–0	Jenison Field House; East Lansing, MI
Nov 29, 1980*		Central Michigan; Spartan Cutlass Classic championship	L 66–89	1–1	Jenison Field House; East Lansing
Dec 4, 1980*		at Long Beach State	W 71–60	2–1	Long Beach Arena; Long Beach, CA
Dec 6, 1980*		at Cal State Fullerton	W 58–42	3–1	Titan Gym; Fullerton, CA
Dec 12, 1980*		Eastern Michigan	W 73–63	4–1	Jenison Field House; East Lansing, MI
Dec 16, 1980*		at BYU	L 50–82	4–2	Marriott Center; Provo, UT
Dec 19, 1980*		vs. Utah State; Industrial National Classic semifinal	L 70–74	4–3	Dunkin' Donuts Center; Providence, RI
Dec 20, 1980*		at Providence; Industrial National Classic third place game	W 77–76	5–3	Dunkin' Donuts Center; Providence, RI
Dec 27, 1980*		Saint Joseph's	W 71–67	6–3	Jenison Field House; East Lansing, MI
Big Ten regular season
Jan 8, 1981		at Indiana	L 43–55	6–4 (0–1)	Assembly Hall; Bloomington, IN
Jan 10, 1981		at No. 11 Iowa	L 57–65	6–5 (0–2)	Iowa Field House; Iowa City, IA
Jan 15, 1981		No. 20 Minnesota	L 77–86	6–6 (0–3)	Jenison Field House; East Lansing, MI
Jan 17, 1981		Northwestern	W 84–70	7–6 (1–3)	Jenison Field House; East Lansing, MI
Jan 22, 1981		at Wisconsin	L 62–63	7–7 (1–4)	Wisconsin Field House; Madison, WI
Jan 24, 1981		at Purdue	W 74–68	8–7 (2–4)	Mackey Arena; West Lafayette, IN
Jan 29, 1981		Illinois	L 70–71	8–8 (2–5)	Jenison Field House; East Lansing, MI
Jan 31, 1981		Ohio State	W 60–54	9–8 (3–5)	Jenison Field House; East Lansing, MI
Feb 5, 1981		at Michigan; Rivalry	L 77–79	9–9 (3–6)	Crisler Arena; Ann Arbor, MI
Feb 7, 1981		at Ohio State	L 62–73	9–10 (3–7)	St. John Arena; Columbus, OH
Feb 12, 1981		Purdue	L 48–63	9–11 (3–8)	Jenison Field House; East Lansing, MI
Feb 14, 1981		No. 13 Michigan; Rivalry	W 70–66	10–11 (4–8)	Jenison Field House; East Lansing, MI
Feb 19, 1981		Wisconsin	W 74–65	11–11 (5–8)	Jenison Field House; East Lansing, MI
Feb 21, 1981		at No. 15 Illinois	L 62–82	11–12 (5–9)	Assembly Hall; Champaign, IL
Feb 26, 1981		at Northwestern	W 74–61	12–12 (6–9)	Welsh-Ryan Arena; Evanston, IL
Feb 28, 1981		at Minnesota	L 89–92	12–13 (6–10)	Williams Arena; Minneapolis, MN
Mar 5, 1981		No. 8 Iowa	W 71–70	13–13 (7–10)	Jenison Field House; East Lansing, MI
Mar 7, 1981		No. 14 Indiana	L 48–69	13–14 (7–11)	Jenison Field House; East Lansing, MI
*Non-conference game. ^{#}Rankings from AP Poll,. (#) Tournament seedings in parentheses. All times are in Central Time Source.

== Awards and honors ==
- Jay Vincent – All-Big Ten First Team
