= 1980–81 Purdue Boilermakers men's basketball team =

American college basketball season

1980–81 Purdue Boilermakers men's basketball

National Invitation Tournament, Third place
- Conference: Big Ten Conference
- Record: 21–11 (10–8 Big Ten)
- Head coach: Gene Keady (1st season)
- Assistant coach: Bruce Weber (1st season)
- Home arena: Mackey Arena

1980–81 Big Ten Conference men's basketball standings
	Conf.				Overall
Team	W		L	PCT	W		L	PCT
No. 9 Indiana	14	–	4	.778	26	–	9	.743
No. 13 Iowa	13	–	5	.722	21	–	7	.750
No. 19 Illinois	12	–	6	.667	21	–	8	.724
Purdue	10	–	8	.556	21	–	11	.656
Minnesota	9	–	9	.500	19	–	11	.633
Ohio State	9	–	9	.500	14	–	13	.519
Michigan	8	–	10	.444	19	–	11	.633
Michigan State	7	–	11	.389	13	–	14	.481
Wisconsin	5	–	13	.278	11	–	16	.407
Northwestern	3	–	15	.167	9	–	18	.333
Rankings from AP Poll

The 1980–81 Purdue Boilermakers men's basketball team represented Purdue University during the 1980–81 college basketball season. The Boilermakers were led by first-year head coach Gene Keady and finished with an overall record of 21–11 (10–8 Big Ten).

== Roster ==
1980–81 Purdue Boilermakers men's basketball team
Players
Coaches

Pos.	#	Name	Height	Weight	Year	Hometown
G	44	Roosevelt Barnes	6 ft 2 in (1.88 m)	195 lb (88 kg)	Sr	Fort Wayne, Indiana
C	35	Ted Benson	6 ft 10 in (2.08 m)	225 lb (102 kg)	So	Atlanta, Georgia
C	40	Russell Cross	6 ft 10 in (2.08 m)	210 lb (95 kg)	Fr	Chicago, Illinois
G	24	Lee Cummings	6 ft 2 in (1.88 m)	180 lb (82 kg)	Jr	Chicago, Illinois
G	11	Keith Edmonson	6 ft 5 in (1.96 m)	195 lb (88 kg)	Jr	San Antonio, Texas
G	41	Jon Kitchell	6 ft 5 in (1.96 m)	195 lb (88 kg)	Jr	Galveston, Indiana
G/F	33	Drake Morris	6 ft 5 in (1.96 m)	195 lb (88 kg)	Sr	East Chicago, Indiana
C	41	Jim Rowinski	6 ft 8 in (2.03 m)	240 lb (109 kg)	Fr	Long Island, New York
F	23	Michael Scearce	6 ft 7 in (2.01 m)	210 lb (95 kg)	Jr	Lexington, Kentucky
G	32	Kevin Stallings	6 ft 5 in (1.96 m)	200 lb (91 kg)	Jr	Collinsville, Illinois
G	20	Brian Walker	6 ft 2 in (1.88 m)	185 lb (84 kg)	Sr	Lebanon, Indiana

Head coach

- Gene Keady (Kansas State)

Assistant coach(es)

- Bruce Weber (Milwaukee)

Legend

- (C) Team captain
- (S) Suspended
- (I) Ineligible
- (W) Walk-on
- Injured
- Current redshirt

== Schedule and results ==
Date time, TV	Rank^{#}	Opponent^{#}	Result	Record	Site city, state
Non-Conference Regular Season
Nov 29, 1980*		Colorado State	W 72–59	1–0	Mackey Arena; West Lafayette, Indiana
Dec 1, 1980*		Loyola Marymount	W 104–75	2–0	Mackey Arena; West Lafayette, Indiana
Dec 6, 1980*		at Tennessee	L 69–78	2–1	Stokely Athletic Center; Knoxville, Tennessee
Dec 8, 1980*		at Butler	W 82–61	3–1	Hinkle Fieldhouse; Indianapolis, Indiana
Dec 11, 1980*		Oklahoma	W 101–86	4–1	Mackey Arena; West Lafayette, Indiana
Dec 13, 1980*		at Providence	W 64–59	5–1	Providence Civic Center; Providence, Rhode Island
Dec 22, 1980*		at Tulsa	L 76–90	5–2	Tulsa Convention Center; Tulsa, Oklahoma
Dec 26, 1980*		vs. Georgia Tech	W 53–45	6–2	Jacksonville Memorial Coliseum; Jacksonville, Florida
Dec 27, 1980*		vs. Florida	W 95–87	7–2	Jacksonville Memorial Coliseum; Jacksonville, Florida
Big Ten Regular Season
Jan 5, 1981		No. 12 Michigan	W 81–74	8–2 (1–0)	Mackey Arena; West Lafayette, Indiana
Jan 10, 1981		Ohio State	W 75–65	9–2 (2–0)	Mackey Arena; West Lafayette, Indiana
Jan 15, 1981		at No. 18 Illinois	L 65–87	9–3 (2–1)	Assembly Hall; Champaign, Illinois
Jan 17, 1981*		at Wisconsin	W 71–69	10–3 (3–1)	Wisconsin Field House; Madison, Wisconsin
Jan 22, 1981		Northwestern	W 55–50	11–3 (4–1)	Mackey Arena; West Lafayette, Indiana
Jan 24, 1981		Michigan State	L 68–74	11–4 (4–2)	Mackey Arena; West Lafayette, Indiana
Jan 29, 1981		at No. 13 Iowa	L 67–84	11–5 (4–3)	Iowa Field House; Iowa City, Iowa
Jan 31, 1981		at Indiana	L 61–69	11–6 (4–4)	Assembly Hall; Bloomington, Indiana
Feb 5, 1981		Minnesota	W 74–59	12–6 (5–4)	Mackey Arena; West Lafayette, Indiana
Feb 7, 1981		No. 17 Indiana	W 68–66	13–6 (6–4)	Mackey Arena; West Lafayette, Indiana
Feb 12, 1981		at Michigan State	W 63–48	14–6 (7–4)	Jenison Field House; East Lansing, Michigan
Feb 14, 1981		at Minnesota	L 72–92	14–7 (7–5)	Williams Arena; Minneapolis, Minnesota
Feb 19, 1981		at Northwestern	W 82–69	15–7 (8–5)	Welsh-Ryan Arena; Evanston, Illinois
Feb 21, 1981		No. 12 Iowa	L 62–67	15–8 (8–6)	Mackey Arena; West Lafayette, Indiana
Feb 26, 1981		Wisconsin	W 72–61	16–8 (9–6)	Mackey Arena; West Lafayette, Indiana
Feb 28, 1981		No. 14 Illinois	L 70–81	16–9 (9–7)	Mackey Arena; West Lafayette, Indiana
Mar 5, 1981		at Ohio State	L 92–93	16–10 (9–8)	St. John Arena; Columbus, Ohio
Mar 7, 1981		at Michigan	W 67–61	17–10 (10–8)	Crisler Arena; Ann Arbor, Michigan
National Invitation Tournament
Mar 12, 1981*		Rhode Island; First Round	W 84–58	18–10	Mackey Arena; West Lafayette, Indiana
Mar 16, 1981*		Dayton; Second Round	W 50–46	19–10	Mackey Arena; West Lafayette, Indiana
Mar 20, 1981*		Duke; Quarterfinal	W 81–69	20–10	Mackey Arena; West Lafayette, Indiana
Mar 23, 1981*		vs. Syracuse; Semifinal	L 63–70	20–11	Madison Square Garden; New York, New York
Mar 25, 1981*		vs. West Virginia; Third Place Game	W 75–72 ^{OT}	21–11	Madison Square Garden; New York, New York
*Non-conference game. ^{#}Rankings from AP Poll. (#) Tournament seedings in parentheses. All times are in Eastern Time.
