= 1980–81 Wisconsin Badgers men's basketball team =

American college basketball season

1980–81 Wisconsin Badgers men's basketball
- Conference: Big Ten Conference
- Record: 11–16 (5–13 Big Ten)
- Head coach: Bill Cofield (5th season)
- Home arena: UW Fieldhouse

1980–81 Big Ten Conference men's basketball standings
	Conf.				Overall
Team	W		L	PCT	W		L	PCT
No. 9 Indiana	14	–	4	.778	26	–	9	.743
No. 13 Iowa	13	–	5	.722	21	–	7	.750
No. 19 Illinois	12	–	6	.667	21	–	8	.724
Purdue	10	–	8	.556	21	–	11	.656
Minnesota	9	–	9	.500	19	–	11	.633
Ohio State	9	–	9	.500	14	–	13	.519
Michigan	8	–	10	.444	19	–	11	.633
Michigan State	7	–	11	.389	13	–	14	.481
Wisconsin	5	–	13	.278	11	–	16	.407
Northwestern	3	–	15	.167	9	–	18	.333
Rankings from AP Poll

The 1980–81 Wisconsin Badgers men's basketball team represented the University of Wisconsin–Madison in the 1980–81 NCAA Division I men's basketball season. The head coach was Bill Cofield, coaching his 5th season with the Badgers. The team played their home games at the UW Fieldhouse in Madison, Wisconsin and was a member of the Big Ten Conference.

Forward Claude Gregory was the team's leading scorer with 20.4 points and 9.2 rebounds in 27 games. Other statistical leaders included guard Danny Hastings with 3.1 assists.

== Roster ==
1980–81 Wisconsin Badgers men's basketball team
Players
Coaches

Pos.	#	Name	Height	Weight	Year	Hometown
G	5	Greg Dandridge	6 ft 2 in (1.88 m)	190 lb (86 kg)	So	Milwaukee, Wisconsin
F	35	Claude Gregory	6 ft 8 in (2.03 m)	210 lb (95 kg)	Sr	Washington, D. C.
G	21	Dan Hastings	6 ft 4 in (1.93 m)	185 lb (84 kg)	Sr	Drexel Hill, PA
G	14	Steve Jacobson	6 ft 1 in (1.85 m)	185 lb (84 kg)	Jr	Pardeeville, Wisconsin
F	30	Mike Kreklow	6 ft 6 in (1.98 m)	190 lb (86 kg)	So	Neenah, Wisconsin
C	00	Larry Petty	6 ft 9 in (2.06 m)	235 lb (107 kg)	Sr	New York, NY
F	44	Gary Zinkgraf	6 ft 7 in (2.01 m)	205 lb (93 kg)	Jr	Bethesda, Maryland

Head coach

- Bill Cofield

Assistant coach(es)

- Bo Ryan

Legend

- (C) Team captain
- (S) Suspended
- (I) Ineligible
- (W) Walk-on
- Injured
- Current redshirt

== Schedule ==
Date time, TV	Rank^{#}	Opponent^{#}	Result	Record	Site city, state
December 1*		at Alabama	L 75–90	0–1	Coleman Coliseum; Tuscaloosa, Alabama
December 5*		Kentucky State	W 77–65	1–1	Wisconsin Field House; Madison, WI
December 6*		UW Green Bay	W 68–66 ^{2OT}	2–1	Wisconsin Field House; Madison, WI
December 9*		Ball State	W 85–72	3–1	Wisconsin Field House; Madison, WI
December 12*		at Davidson	L 63–67	3–2	Charlotte Coliseum; Charlotte, NC
December 13*		at Charlotte	W 71–63	4–2	Charlotte Coliseum; Charlotte, NC
December 22*		Texas Southern	W 58–49	5–2	Wisconsin Field House; Madison, WI
December 31*		Central Michigan	W 69–62	6–2	Wisconsin Field House; Madison, WI
January 8		at Minnesota	L 60–76	6–3 (0—1)	Williams Arena; Minneapolis, Minnesota
January 10		at Northwestern	L 48–50	6–4 (0—2)	Welsh-Ryan Arena; Evanston, Illinois
January 15		Iowa	L 66–76	6–5 (0—3)	Wisconsin Field House; Madison, WI
January 17		Purdue	L 69–71	6–6 (0—4)	Wisconsin Field House; Madison, WI
January 22		Michigan State	W 63–62	7–6 (1—4)	Wisconsin Field House; Madison, WI
January 24		at Illinois	W 54–45	8–6 (2—4)	Assembly Hall; Champaign, Illinois
January 27		at Ohio State	L 67–71	8–7 (2—5)	St. John Arena; Columbus, Ohio
January 31		Michigan	L 67–74	8–8 (2—6)	Wisconsin Field House; Madison, WI
February 5		at Indiana	L 64–89	8–9 (2—7)	Assembly Hall; Bloomington, Indiana
February 7		at Michigan	L 64–71	8–10 (2—8)	Crisler Arena; Ann Arbor, Michigan
February 12		Illinois	L 65–84	8–11 (2—9)	Wisconsin Field House; Madison, WI
February 14		Indiana	L 52–59	8–12 (2—10)	Wisconsin Field House; Madison, WI
February 19		at Michigan State	L 65–74	8–13 (2—11)	Jenison Field House; East Lansing, Michigan
February 21		Ohio State	W 77–63	9–13 (3—11)	Wisconsin Field House; Madison, WI
February 26		at Purdue	L 61–72	9–14 (3—12)	Mackey Arena; West Lafayette, Indiana
February 28		at Iowa	L 75–96	9–15 (3—13)	Iowa Field House; Iowa City, Iowa
March 5		Northwestern	W 60–57	10–15 (4—13)	Wisconsin Field House; Madison, WI
March 7		Minnesota	W 60–58	11–15 (5—13)	Wisconsin Field House; Madison, WI
March 10*		Marquette	L 53–64	11–16 (5—13)	Wisconsin Field House; Madison, WI
*Non-conference game. ^{#}Rankings from AP Poll. (#) Tournament seedings in parentheses.

== Team players drafted into the NBA ==
Round	Pick	Player	NBA club
2	41	Claude Gregory	Washington Bullets
7	157	Larry Petty	Los Angeles Lakers
