= 1980–81 Minnesota Golden Gophers men's basketball team =

American college basketball season

1980–81 Minnesota Golden Gophers men's basketball

National Invitation Tournament, Quarterfinals L 69–80 vs. West Virginia
- Conference: Big Ten Conference
- Record: 19–11 (9–9 Big Ten)
- Head coach: Jim Dutcher
- Assistant coaches: Jimmy Williams; Jessie Evans; Marty Gillespie
- Home arena: Williams Arena

1980–81 Big Ten Conference men's basketball standings
| | Conf. | | | | Overall |
| Team | W | | L | PCT | W | | L | PCT |
|---|---|---|---|---|---|---|---|---|
| No. 9 Indiana | 14 | – | 4 | .778 | 26 | – | 9 | .743 |
| No. 13 Iowa | 13 | – | 5 | .722 | 21 | – | 7 | .750 |
| No. 19 Illinois | 12 | – | 6 | .667 | 21 | – | 8 | .724 |
| Purdue | 10 | – | 8 | .556 | 21 | – | 11 | .656 |
| Minnesota | 9 | – | 9 | .500 | 19 | – | 11 | .633 |
| Ohio State | 9 | – | 9 | .500 | 14 | – | 13 | .519 |
| Michigan | 8 | – | 10 | .444 | 19 | – | 11 | .633 |
| Michigan State | 7 | – | 11 | .389 | 13 | – | 14 | .481 |
| Wisconsin | 5 | – | 13 | .278 | 11 | – | 16 | .407 |
| Northwestern | 3 | – | 15 | .167 | 9 | – | 18 | .333 |
Rankings from AP Poll

The 1980–81 Minnesota Golden Gophers men's basketball team represented the University of Minnesota as a member of the Big Ten Conference during the 1980–81 NCAA Division I men's basketball season.

== Roster ==
1980–81 Minnesota Golden Gophers men's basketball team
Players
Coaches

| Pos. | # | Name | Height | Weight | Year | Hometown |
|---|---|---|---|---|---|---|
| C | 45 | Randy Breuer | 7 ft 3 in (2.21 m) | 225 lb (102 kg) | So | Lake City, Minnesota |
| F | 54 | Ben Coleman | 6 ft 9 in (2.06 m) | 230 lb (104 kg) | So | Minneapolis, Minnesota |
| G | 24 | Mark Hall | 6 ft 2 in (1.88 m) | 191 lb (87 kg) | Jr | Springfield, Massachusetts |
| G | 31 | Brian Hansen | 6 ft 3 in (1.91 m) | 186 lb (84 kg) | Fr | Duluth, Minnesota |
| F | 42 | Gary Holmes | 6 ft 10 in (2.08 m) | 239 lb (108 kg) | Jr | Miami, Florida |
| F | 33 | Zebedee Howell | 6 ft 7 in (2.01 m) | 216 lb (98 kg) | So | Ocala, Florida |
| G | 3 | Bruce Kaupa | 6 ft 1 in (1.85 m) | 176 lb (80 kg) | So | Woodbury, Minnesota |
| G | 30 | Darryl Mitchell | 6 ft 5 in (1.96 m) | 201 lb (91 kg) | Jr | West Palm Beach, Florida |
| C | 40 | Brian Pederson | 6 ft 10 in (2.08 m) | 210 lb (95 kg) | Jr | Prior Lake, Minnesota |
| F/C | 20 | Jim Petersen | 6 ft 10 in (2.08 m) | 225 lb (102 kg) | Fr | St. Louis Park, Minnesota |
| F | 21 | Andy Thompson | 6 ft 6 in (1.98 m) | 211 lb (96 kg) | Jr | Nassau, Bahamas |
| G | 32 | Trent Tucker | 6 ft 5 in (1.96 m) | 185 lb (84 kg) | Jr | Flint, Michigan |
| F | 35 | John Wiley | 6 ft 9 in (2.06 m) | 203 lb (92 kg) | Jr | Flint, Michigan |

Head coach

- Jim Dutcher (Michigan)

Assistant coach(es)

- Jessie Evans
- Jimmy Williams

Legend

- (C) Team captain
- (S) Suspended
- (I) Ineligible
- (W) Walk-on
- Injured
- Current redshirt

== Schedule and results ==
| Date time, TV | Rank^{#} | Opponent^{#} | Result | Record | Site city, state |
|---|---|---|---|---|---|
| November 29* | | North Dakota State | W 99–64 | 1–0 | Williams Arena; Minneapolis, Minnesota |
| December 2* | | Florida State | W 79–66 | 2–0 | Williams Arena; Minneapolis, Minnesota |
| December 5* | | vs. Loyola (IL) | W 100–83 | 3–0 | |
| December 17* | | Marquette | L 84–92 | 3–1 | Williams Arena; Minneapolis, Minnesota |
| December 22* | | at Louisville | W 62–56 | 4–1 | Freedom Hall; Louisville, KY |
| December 26* | | Yale | W 95–56 | 5–1 | Williams Arena; Minneapolis, Minnesota |
| December 27* | | Texas Tech | W 72–56 | 6–1 | Williams Arena; Minneapolis, Minnesota |
| December 29* | | at USC | W 74–67 | 7–1 | L.A. Sports Arena; Los Angeles, California |
| December 30* | | vs. North Carolina | W 76–60 | 8–1 | L.A. Sports Arena; Los Angeles, California |
| January 8 | No. 19 | Wisconsin | W 76–60 | 9–1 (1–0) | Williams Arena; Minneapolis, Minnesota |
| January 10 | No. 19 | No. 10 Michigan | L 67–68 | 9–2 (1–1) | Williams Arena; Minneapolis, Minnesota |
| January 15 | No. 20 | at Michigan State | W 86–77 | 10–2 (2–1) | Jenison Field House; East Lansing, Michigan |
| January 17 | No. 20 | at Illinois | L 76–80 | 10–3 (2–2) | Assembly Hall; Champaign, Illinois |
| January 22 | | Ohio State | L 63–76 | 10–4 (2–3) | Williams Arena; Minneapolis, Minnesota |
| January 24 | | at No. 9 Iowa | W 60–48 | 11–4 (3–3) | Iowa Field House; Iowa City, Iowa |
| January 29 | No. 19 | Indiana | L 53–56 ^{OT} | 11–5 (3–4) | Williams Arena; Minneapolis, Minnesota |
| January 31 | No. 19 | Northwestern | W 74–63 | 12–5 (4–4) | Williams Arena; Minneapolis, Minnesota |
| February 5 | | at Purdue | L 59–74 | 12–6 (4–5) | Mackey Arena; West Lafayette, Indiana |
| February 7 | | at Northwestern | W 68–62 | 13–6 (5–5) | Welsh–Ryan Arena; Evanston, IL |
| February 12 | | Iowa | L 58–60 | 13–7 (5–6) | Williams Arena; Minneapolis, Minnesota |
| February 14 | | Purdue | W 92–72 | 14–7 (6–6) | Williams Arena; Minneapolis, Minnesota |
| February 19 | | at Ohio State | W 82–76 | 15–7 (7–6) | St. John Arena; Columbus, Ohio |
| February 21 | | at No. 16 Indiana | L 63–74 | 15–8 (7–7) | Assembly Hall; Bloomington, Indiana |
| February 26 | | No. 14 Illinois | W 76–59 | 16–8 (8–7) | Williams Arena; Minneapolis, Minnesota |
| February 28 | | Michigan State | W 92–89 | 17–8 (9–7) | Williams Arena; Minneapolis, Minnesota |
| March 5 | | at Michigan | L 67–83 | 17–9 (9–8) | Crisler Center; Ann Arbor, Michigan |
| March 7 | | at Wisconsin | L 58–60 | 17–10 (9–9) | Wisconsin Field House; Madison, WI |
NIT
| March 11* | | Drake; First Round | W 90–77 | 18–10 (9–9) | Williams Arena; Minneapolis, Minnesota |
| March 16* | | at Connecticut; Second Round | W 84–66 | 19–10 (9–9) | Hartford Civic Center; Hartford, CT |
| March 19* | | West Virginia; Quarterfinals | L 69–80 | 19–11 (9–9) | Williams Arena; Minneapolis, Minnesota |
*Non-conference game. ^{#}Rankings from AP Poll. (#) Tournament seedings in parentheses.
