= 1980–81 Indiana Hoosiers men's basketball team =

American college basketball season

1980–81 Indiana Hoosiers men's basketball

NCAA tournament National Champions Big Ten champions

National Championship Game, W 63–50 vs. North Carolina
- Conference: Big Ten Conference

Ranking
- Coaches: No. 7
- AP: No. 9
- Record: 26–9 (14–4 Big Ten)
- Head coach: Bobby Knight (10th season)
- Assistant coaches: Jim Crews; Jene Davis; Gerry Gimelstob
- Captains: Ray Tolbert; Glen Grunwald
- Home arena: Assembly Hall

1980–81 Big Ten Conference men's basketball standings
	Conf.				Overall
Team	W		L	PCT	W		L	PCT
No. 9 Indiana	14	–	4	.778	26	–	9	.743
No. 13 Iowa	13	–	5	.722	21	–	7	.750
No. 19 Illinois	12	–	6	.667	21	–	8	.724
Purdue	10	–	8	.556	21	–	11	.656
Minnesota	9	–	9	.500	19	–	11	.633
Ohio State	9	–	9	.500	14	–	13	.519
Michigan	8	–	10	.444	19	–	11	.633
Michigan State	7	–	11	.389	13	–	14	.481
Wisconsin	5	–	13	.278	11	–	16	.407
Northwestern	3	–	15	.167	9	–	18	.333
Rankings from AP Poll

The 1980–81 Indiana Hoosiers men's basketball team represented Indiana University. Their head coach was Bobby Knight, who was in his 10th year. The team played its home games in Assembly Hall in Bloomington, Indiana, and was a member of the Big Ten Conference.

The Hoosiers finished the regular season with an overall record of 26–9 and a conference record of 14–4, finishing 1st in the Big Ten Conference. As Big Ten Conference Champions, IU was invited to participate in the 1981 NCAA Tournament as a #3 seed. The Hoosiers advanced to the championship game, where Bobby Knight and the Hoosiers won their fourth national title.

== Roster ==
1980–81 Indiana Hoosiers men's basketball team
Players
Coaches

Pos.	#	Name	Height	Weight	Year	Hometown
F	54	Steve Bouchie	6 ft 8 in (2.03 m)	228 lb (103 kg)	So	Washington, Indiana
G	31	Tony Brown	6 ft 2 in (1.88 m)	178 lb (81 kg)	So	Chicago, Illinois
G	23	Chuck Franz	6 ft 2 in (1.88 m)	160 lb (73 kg)	So	Clarksville, Indiana
F	40	Glen Grunwald	6 ft 9 in (2.06 m)	207 lb (94 kg)	Sr	Franklin Park, Illinois
F	44	Phil Isenbarger	6 ft 8 in (2.03 m)	192 lb (87 kg)	Sr	Muncie, Indiana
F	30	Ted Kitchel	6 ft 8 in (2.03 m)	209 lb (95 kg)	Jr	Galveston, Indiana
F	43	Mike LaFave	6 ft 9 in (2.06 m)	188 lb (85 kg)	Fr	Indianapolis, Indiana
F	34	Steve Risley	6 ft 8 in (2.03 m)	215 lb (98 kg)	Sr	Indianapolis, Indiana
G	11	Isiah Thomas	6 ft 1 in (1.85 m)	185 lb (84 kg)	So	Chicago, Illinois
G	20	Jim Thomas	6 ft 3 in (1.91 m)	189 lb (86 kg)	So	Fort Lauderdale, Florida
F/C	45	Ray Tolbert	6 ft 9 in (2.06 m)	225 lb (102 kg)	Sr	Anderson, Indiana
F/C	32	Landon Turner	6 ft 10 in (2.08 m)	241 lb (109 kg)	Jr	Indianapolis, Indiana
G	24	Randy Wittman	6 ft 6 in (1.98 m)	205 lb (93 kg)	Jr	Indianapolis, Indiana

Head coach

- Bob Knight (Ohio State)

Assistant coach(es)

- Jim Crews (Indiana)
- Jene Davis (Otterbein)
- Gerry Gimelstob (Rhode Island)

Legend

- (C) Team captain
- (S) Suspended
- (I) Ineligible
- (W) Walk-on
- Injured
- Current redshirt

== Schedule/results ==
Date time, TV	Rank^{#}	Opponent^{#}	Result	Record	Site city, state
Regular season
11/29/1980*	No. 5	Ball State	W 75–69	1–0	Assembly Hall; Bloomington, Indiana
12/1/1980*	No. 5	Murray State	W 59–41	2–0	Assembly Hall; Bloomington, Indiana
12/6/1980*	No. 5	No. 2 Kentucky; Indiana–Kentucky rivalry	L 66–68	2–1	Assembly Hall; Bloomington, Indiana
12/9/1980*	No. 7	at No. 9 Notre Dame	L 64–68	2–2	Joyce Center; Notre Dame, Indiana
12/12/1980*	No. 7	California; Indiana Classic	W 94–58	3–2	Assembly Hall; Bloomington, Indiana
12/13/1980*	No. 7	Baylor; Indiana Classic	W 83–47	4–2	Assembly Hall; Bloomington, Indiana
12/15/1980*	No. 7	vs. Oral Roberts	W 65–56	5–2	Market Square Arena; Indianapolis
12/20/1980*; NBC/TVS	No. 11	at No. 8 North Carolina	L 56–65	5–3	Carmichael Auditorium; Chapel Hill, North Carolina
12/23/1980*	No. 15	at Kansas State	W 51–44	6–3	Ahearn Field House; Manhattan, Kansas
12/28/1980*	No. 15	vs. Rutgers; Rainbow Classic Quarterfinals	W 55–50	7–3	Neal S. Blaisdell Center; Honolulu, HI
12/29/1980*	No. 15	vs. Clemson; Rainbow Classic Semifinals	L 57–58	7–4	Neal S. Blaisdell Center; Honolulu, HI
12/30/1980*	No. 15	vs. Texas-Pan American; Rainbow Classic Consolation round	L 60–66	7–5	Neal S. Blaisdell Center; Honolulu, HI
1/8/1981		Michigan State	W 55–43	8–5 (1–0)	Assembly Hall; Bloomington, Indiana
1/10/1981		No. 12 Illinois; Rivalry	W 78–61	9–5 (2–0)	Assembly Hall; Bloomington, Indiana
1/15/1981		at No. 9 Michigan	L 52–55	9–6 (2–1)	Crisler Arena; Ann Arbor, Michigan
1/18/1981		at Ohio State	W 67–60	10–6 (3–1)	St. John Arena; Columbus, Ohio
1/22/1981		No. 14 Iowa	L 53–56	10–7 (3–2)	Assembly Hall; Bloomington, Indiana
1/24/1981		at Northwestern	W 93–56	11–7 (4–2)	Welsh-Ryan Arena; Evanston, Illinois
1/29/1981		at No. 19 Minnesota	W 56–53	12–7 (5–2)	Williams Arena; Minneapolis
1/31/1981		Purdue; Rivalry	W 69–61	13–7 (6–2)	Assembly Hall; Bloomington, Indiana
2/5/1981	No. 17	Wisconsin	W 89–64	14–7 (7–2)	Assembly Hall; Bloomington, Indiana
2/7/1981	No. 17	at Purdue; Rivalry	L 66–68	14–8 (7–3)	Mackey Arena; West Lafayette, Indiana
2/12/1981		Northwestern	W 86–52	15–8 (8–3)	Assembly Hall; Bloomington, Indiana
2/14/1981	No. 20	at Wisconsin	W 59–52	16–8 (9–3)	Wisconsin Field House; Madison, Wisconsin
2/19/1981	No. 16	at No. 12 Iowa	L 65–78	16–9 (9–4)	Iowa Field House; Iowa City, Iowa
2/21/1981	No. 16	Minnesota	W 74–63	17–9 (10–4)	Assembly Hall; Bloomington, Indiana
2/26/1981	No. 16	Ohio State	W 74–58	18–9 (11–4)	Assembly Hall; Bloomington, Indiana
2/28/1981	No. 16	Michigan	W 98–83	19–9 (12–4)	Assembly Hall; Bloomington, Indiana
3/5/1981	No. 14	at No. 16 Illinois; Rivalry	W 69–66	20–9 (13–4)	Assembly Hall; Champaign, Illinois
3/7/1981	No. 14	at Michigan State	W 69–48	21–9 (14–4)	Jenison Fieldhouse; East Lansing, Michigan
NCAA Tournament
3/14/1981*; NBC	(3 ME) No. 9	vs. (6 ME) No. 18 Maryland; Second Round	W 99–64	22–9 (14–4)	University of Dayton Arena; Dayton, Ohio
3/20/1981*; NCAA/ESPN	(3 ME) No. 9	(7 ME) UAB; Sweet Sixteen	W 87–72	23–9 (14–4)	Assembly Hall; Bloomington, Indiana
3/22/1981*; NBC	(3 ME) No. 9	(9 ME) St. Joseph's (Pa.); Elite Eight	W 78–46	24–9 (14–4)	Assembly Hall; Bloomington, Indiana
3/28/1981*; 1:45 p.m., NBC	(3 ME) No. 9	(1 MW) No. 4 LSU; Final Four	W 67–49	25–9 (14–4)	The Spectrum; Philadelphia
3/30/1981*; NBC	(3 ME) No. 9	(2 W) No. 6 North Carolina; Championship	W 63–50	26–9 (14–4)	The Spectrum; Philadelphia
*Non-conference game. ^{#}Rankings from AP Poll. (#) Tournament seedings in parentheses. ME=Mideast. All times are in Eastern Time.

== Awards and honors ==
- Bob Knight, Big Ten Coach of the Year
- Isiah Thomas, NCAA Men's MOP Award
- Ray Tolbert, Big Ten Player of the Year

== Team players drafted into the NBA ==
Year	Round	Pick	Player	NBA club
1981	1	2	Isiah Thomas	Detroit Pistons
1981	1	18	Ray Tolbert	New Jersey Nets
1981	5	115	Glen Grunwald	Boston Celtics
1981	8	180	Steve Risley	Phoenix Suns
1982	10	225	Landon Turner	Boston Celtics
1983	1	22	Randy Wittman	Washington Bullets
1983	2	40	Jim Thomas	Indiana Pacers
1983	2	41	Ted Kitchel	Milwaukee Bucks
1983	4	78	Steve Bouchie	Detroit Pistons
1983	7	141	Tony Brown	Indiana Pacers

== Notes ==
- This was guard Isiah Thomas' sophomore season. Fresh off a national championship and the 1981 NCAA men's basketball tournament MVP, Thomas declared early for the 1981 NBA draft and was selected #2 overall by the Detroit Pistons.
- On July 25, 1981, forward Landon Turner was injured in a car crash and suffered a fractured spine and paralysis in both legs.
