= List of Detroit Mercy Titans men's basketball head coaches =

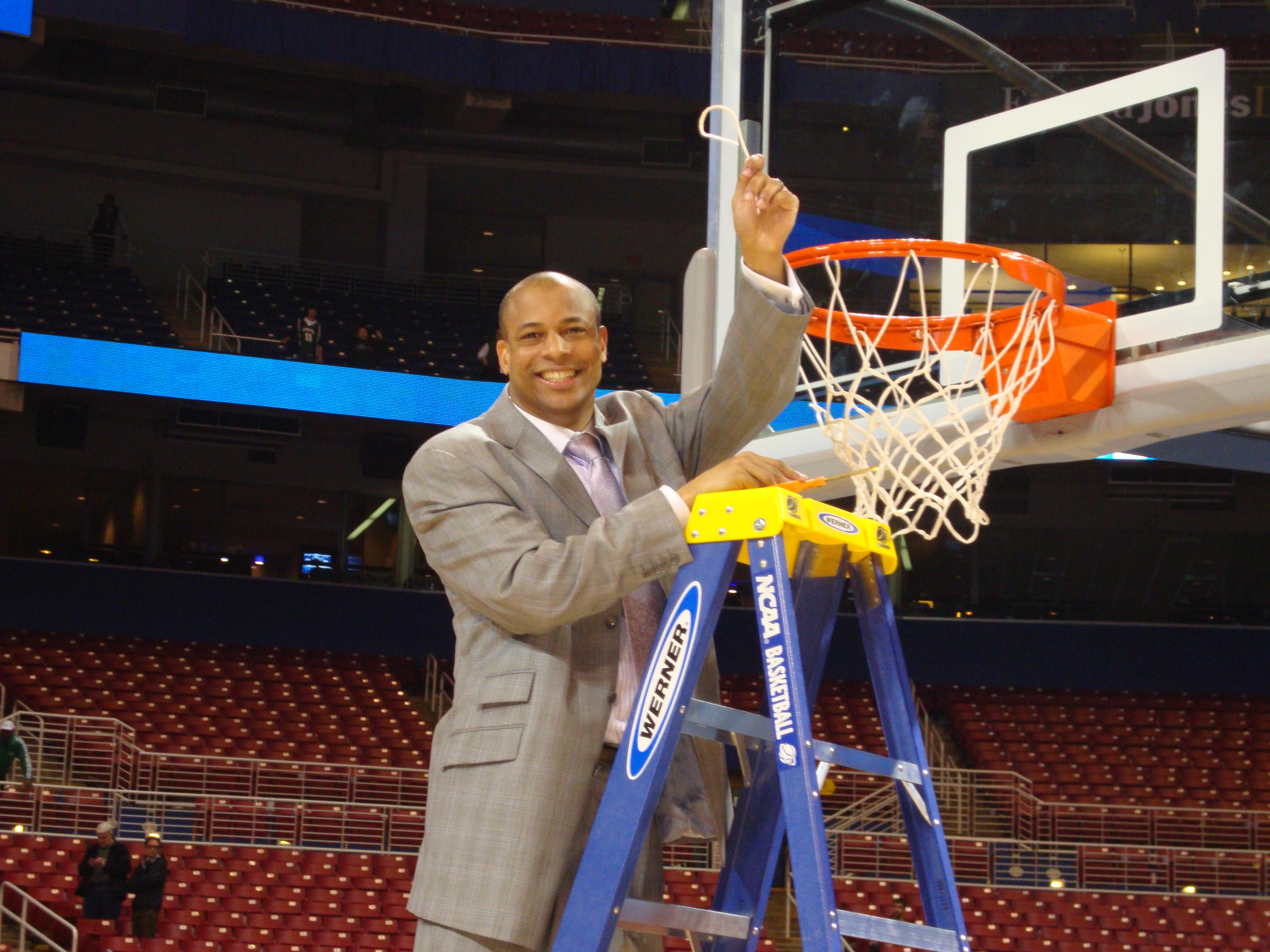
Mark Montgomery, the current head coach of the Detroit Mercy Titans.

The following is a list of Detroit Mercy Titans men's basketball head coaches. There have been 23 head coaches of the Titans in their 117-season history.

Detroit Mercy's current head coach is Mark Montgomery. He was hired as the Titans' head coach on April 3rd, 2024, replacing Mike Davis, who did not return after the 2023–24 season.

No.	Tenure	Coach	Years	Record	Pct.
1	1905–1907	C. B. Lundy	2	4–4	.500
2	1909–1913; 1916–1919	Royal R. Campbell	7	49–22	.690
3	1913–1916	Walter Hardy	5	30–10	.750
4	1919–1922	James M. Brown	3	24–28	.462
5	1922–1923	Paul Harbrecht	1	9–7	.563
6	1923–1925	John Barrett	2	15–14	.517
7	1925–1929	Gus Dorais	4	36–30	.545
8	1929–1930	Louis Conroy	1	10–9	.526
9	1930–1946	Lloyd Brazil	16	185–118	.611
10	1946–1948	John Shada	2	19–28	.404
11	1948–1969	Bob Calihan	21	306–237	.564
12	1969–1973	Jim Harding	4	55–45	.550
13	1973–1977	Dick Vitale	4	78–30	.722
14	1977–1979	Smokey Gaines	2	47–10	.825
15	1979–1982	Willie McCarter	3	33–48	.407
16	1982–1987 (Note: Sicko resigned three games into the 1987–88 season. Mulroy served as interim coach for the remainder of the season.)	Don Sicko	6	57–88	.393
17	1987–1988*	John Mulroy	1	7–20	.259
18	1988–1993	Ricky Byrdsong	5	53–87	.379
19	1993–2008 (Note: Watson took a leave of absence in January 2008 for medical reasons. Assistant coach Kevin Mondro oversaw the team in his absence, but Detroit Mercy credits the team's record during this period to Watson.)	Perry Watson	15	261–198	.569
20	2008–2016	Ray McCallum	8	130–132	.496
21	2016–2018	Bacari Alexander	2	16–47	.254
22	2018–2024	Mike Davis	5	59–88	.401
23	2024–Present	Mark Montgomery	1	8–24	.250
Totals		22 coaches	116 seasons	1,468–1,301	.530
Records updated through end of 2022–23 season * - Denotes interim head coach. Source
