= 1980–81 Illinois Fighting Illini men's basketball team =

American college basketball season

1980–81 Illinois Fighting Illini men's basketball

Illini Classic, Champion

NCAA Men's Division I Tournament, Regional semifinals
- Conference: Big Ten Conference

Ranking
- Coaches: No. 18
- AP: No. 19
- Record: 21–8 (12–6 Big Ten)
- Head coach: Lou Henson (6th season)
- Assistant coaches: Tony Yates (7th season); Dick Nagy (2nd season); Bob Hull (1st season)
- MVP: Eddie Johnson
- Captains: Derek Holcomb; Eddie Johnson; Mark Smith
- Home arena: Assembly Hall

1980–81 Big Ten Conference men's basketball standings
	Conf.				Overall
Team	W		L	PCT	W		L	PCT
No. 9 Indiana	14	–	4	.778	26	–	9	.743
No. 13 Iowa	13	–	5	.722	21	–	7	.750
No. 19 Illinois	12	–	6	.667	21	–	8	.724
Purdue	10	–	8	.556	21	–	11	.656
Minnesota	9	–	9	.500	19	–	11	.633
Ohio State	9	–	9	.500	14	–	13	.519
Michigan	8	–	10	.444	19	–	11	.633
Michigan State	7	–	11	.389	13	–	14	.481
Wisconsin	5	–	13	.278	11	–	16	.407
Northwestern	3	–	15	.167	9	–	18	.333
Rankings from AP Poll

The 1980–81 Illinois Fighting Illini men's basketball team represented the University of Illinois.

== Regular season ==
In 1981, Illinois made strides in its return to the national spotlight with a 21–8 record, a third-place Big Ten finish and an invitation to the NCAA Tournament. The team received a first-round bye in the NCAA tournament and beat Wyoming, 67–65, in Los Angeles to advance to the regionals in Salt Lake City, where Illinois lost to Kansas State, 57–52. During this season, the Fighting Illini led the Big Ten in scoring for the second consecutive season and were again led by Eddie Johnson and Mark Smith. Guards Craig Tucker and Derek Harper arrived to add backcourt punch, and Harper began his Illini career being named First-Team Freshman All-America by ESPN and ABC.

This season marked a change in location and name for the annual game with Missouri. The name was altered from the "Show-Me Classic" to the "Braggin' Rights" and took on a permanent location, St. Louis, with the St. Louis Arena as its original home. Prior to 1980, the location of the game alternated from Assembly Hall and the Hearnes Center. Since 1994, the game is played at the Scottrade Center.

=== Roster ===
1980–81 Illinois Fighting Illini men's basketball team
Players
Coaches

Pos.	#	Name	Height	Weight	Year	Previous school	Hometown
G	10	Craig Tucker	6 ft 1 in (1.85 m)	175 lb (79 kg)	Jr	Flint Northern High School	Flint, Michigan
G	12	Derek Harper	6 ft 4 in (1.93 m)	185 lb (84 kg)	Fr	North Shore High School	West Palm Beach, Florida
C	13	James Griffin	6 ft 10 in (2.08 m)	205 lb (93 kg)	Jr	Dunbar High School	Grandview, Texas
G	14	Sherrod Arnold	5 ft 11 in (1.8 m)	150 lb (68 kg)	So	Wendell Phillips High School	Chicago, Illinois
G/F	15	Mitch Arnold	6 ft 5 in (1.96 m)	190 lb (86 kg)	Fr	Effingham High School	Effingham, Illinois
G	20	Kevin Bontemps	6 ft 2 in (1.88 m)	180 lb (82 kg)	So	Morton High School	Morton, Illinois
G	21	Quinn Richardson	5 ft 11 in (1.8 m)	175 lb (79 kg)	So	Eisenhower High School	Robbins, Illinois
G	22	Perry Range	6 ft 4 in (1.93 m)	180 lb (82 kg)	Jr	South Beloit High School	South Beloit, Illinois
F	33	Eddie Johnson (C)	6 ft 8 in (2.03 m)	215 lb (98 kg)	Sr	Westinghouse High School	Chicago, Illinois
F	42	Mark Smith (C)	6 ft 8 in (2.03 m)	215 lb (98 kg)	Sr	Richwoods High School	Peoria, Illinois
F	43	Bryan Leonard	6 ft 10 in (2.08 m)	210 lb (95 kg)	RS So	Belleville High School-East	Belleville, Illinois
C	44	Derek Holcomb (C)	6 ft 11 in (2.11 m)	230 lb (104 kg)	Sr	Richwoods High School	Peoria, Illinois

Head coach

- Lou Henson (New Mexico State University) (6th year)

Assistant coach(es)

- Tony Yates (University of Cincinnati) (7th year)
- Dick Nagy (Hardin-Simmons University) (2nd year)
- Bob Hull (1st year)

Legend

- (C) Team captain
- (S) Suspended
- (I) Ineligible
- (W) Walk-on
- Injured
- Current redshirt

Roster

== Schedule ==
Date time, TV	Rank^{#}	Opponent^{#}	Result	Record	Site (attendance) city, state
Non-Conference regular season
11/29/1980*		Loyola Marymount	W 98–65	1–0	Assembly Hall (11,168); Champaign, IL
12/6/1980*		TCU	W 84–62	2–0	Assembly Hall (14,370); Champaign, IL
12/10/1980*		vs. No. 14 Missouri; Braggin' Rights	W 84–62	3–0	St. Louis Arena (14,370); St. Louis, MO
12/13/1980*		Marquette	W 69–68	4–0	U.S. Cellular Arena (11,052); Milwaukee, WI
12/19/1980*	No. 17	vs. No. 18 BYU; Volunteer Classic	L 75–88	4–1	Stokely Athletic Center (12,700); Knoxville, TN
12/20/1980*	No. 17	vs. Iona; Volunteer Classic	W 106–84	5–1	Stokely Athletic Center (12,700); Knoxville, TN
12/26/1980*	No. 18	Ohio; Illini Classic	W 84–54	6–1	Assembly Hall (14,230); Champaign, IL
12/27/1980*	No. 18	Oklahoma; Illini Classic	W 93–63	7–1	Assembly Hall (15,411); Champaign, IL
1/3/1981*	No. 16	SIU Edwardsville	W 108–68	8–1	Assembly Hall (11,443); Champaign, IL
Big Ten regular season
1/8/1981	No. 12	at Northwestern; Rivalry	W 88–64	9–1 (1–0)	McGaw Memorial Hall (7,741); Evanston, IL
1/10/1981	No. 12	at Indiana; Rivalry	L 61–78	9–2 (1–1)	Assembly Hall (17,083); Bloomington, IN
1/15/1981	No. 18	Purdue	W 87–65	10–2 (2–1)	Assembly Hall (16,506); Champaign, IL
1/17/1981	No. 18	No. 20 Minnesota	W 80–76	11–2 (3–1)	Assembly Hall (16,630); Champaign, IL
1/22/1981	No. 15	at No. 16 Michigan	L 76–80	11–3 (3–2)	Crisler Center (11,055); Ann Arbor, MI
1/24/1981	No. 15	Wisconsin	L 45–54	11–4 (3–3)	Assembly Hall (16,495); Champaign, IL
1/29/1981		at Michigan State	W 71–70	12–4 (4–3)	Jenison Fieldhouse (7,443); East Lansing, MI
1/31/1981		No. 13 Iowa; Rivalry	W 79–66	13–4 (5–3)	Assembly Hall (16,555); Champaign, IL
2/5/1981	No. 18	Ohio State	W 82–63	14–4 (6–3)	Assembly Hall (16,586); Champaign, IL
2/7/1981	No. 18	at No. 15 Iowa; Rivalry	L 66–72	14–5 (6–4)	Iowa Field House (13,365); Iowa City, IA
2/12/1981	No. 17	at Wisconsin	W 84–65	15–5 (7–4)	Wisconsin Field House (7,334); Madison, WI
2/14/1981	No. 17	at Ohio State	W 63–57	16–5 (8–4)	St. John Arena (13,591); Columbus, OH
2/19/1981	No. 15	No. 18 Michigan	W 67–64	17–5 (9–4)	Assembly Hall (16,492); Champaign, IL
2/21/1981	No. 15	Michigan State	W 82–62	18–5 (10–4)	Assembly Hall (16,559); Champaign, IL
2/26/1981	No. 14	at Minnesota	L 59–76	18–6 (10–5)	Williams Arena (16,290); Minneapolis, MN
2/28/1981	No. 14	at Purdue	W 81–70	19–6 (11–5)	Mackey Arena (14,123); West Lafayette, IN
3/5/1981	No. 16	No. 14 Indiana; Rivalry	L 66–69	19–7 (11–6)	Assembly Hall (16,663); Champaign, IL
3/7/1981	No. 16	Northwestern; Rivalry	W 98–76	20–7 (12–6)	Assembly Hall (16,622); Champaign, IL
NCAA Tournament
3/14/1981*	(4 W) No. 19	vs. (5 W) No. 17 Wyoming; Second Round	W 67–65	21–7	Pauley Pavilion (12,340); Los Angeles, CA
3/19/1981*	(4 W) No. 19	vs. (8 W) Kansas State; Regional semifinals	L 52–57	21–7	Jon M. Huntsman Center (15,450); Salt Lake City, UT
*Non-conference game. ^{#}Rankings from AP Poll. (#) Tournament seedings in parentheses. All times are in Central Time.

== Player stats ==
Player	Games played	Minutes played	Field goals	Free throws	Rebounds	Assists	Blocks	Steals	Points
Eddie Johnson	29	1009	219	62	267	70	6	30	500
Mark Smith	29	914	150	102	172	98	18	36	402
Craig Tucker	29	615	117	76	39	58	3	19	310
Perry Range	29	815	101	65	115	70	0	33	267
Derek Harper	29	934	104	33	75	156	8	39	241
James Griffin	29	519	117	76	39	58	3	18	227
Derek Holcomb	29	635	70	31	148	40	42	14	171
Bryan Leonard	25	200	26	7	44	12	8	3	59
Kevin Bontempts	19	78	12	12	7	17	1	2	36
Quinn Richardson	22	62	9	7	9	7	0	5	25
Sherrod Arnold	7	44	4	6	10	5	0	1	14
Mitch Arnold	3	27	1	0	5	2	0	0	2

== Awards and honors ==
- Eddie Johnson
  - Fighting Illini All-Century team (2005)
  - Team Most Valuable Player
- Derek Harper
  - Fighting Illini All-Century team (2005)

== Team players drafted into the NBA ==
Player	NBA club	Round	Pick
Eddie Johnson	Kansas City Kings	2	29
Derek Holcomb	Portland Trail Blazers	3	50
Mark Smith	Milwaukee Bucks	3	67
