= 1980–81 Iowa Hawkeyes men's basketball team =

American college basketball season

1980–81 Iowa Hawkeyes men's basketball

NCAA Men's Division I Tournament, Round of 32
- Conference: Big Ten Conference

Ranking
- Coaches: No. 12
- AP: No. 13
- Record: 21–7 (13–5 Big Ten)
- Head coach: Lute Olson (7th season)
- Assistant coaches: Jim Rosborough; Ken Burmeister; Scott Thompson
- MVP: Vince Brookins
- Home arena: Iowa Field House (Capacity: 13,365)

1980–81 Big Ten Conference men's basketball standings
	Conf.				Overall
Team	W		L	PCT	W		L	PCT
No. 9 Indiana	14	–	4	.778	26	–	9	.743
No. 13 Iowa	13	–	5	.722	21	–	7	.750
No. 19 Illinois	12	–	6	.667	21	–	8	.724
Purdue	10	–	8	.556	21	–	11	.656
Minnesota	9	–	9	.500	19	–	11	.633
Ohio State	9	–	9	.500	14	–	13	.519
Michigan	8	–	10	.444	19	–	11	.633
Michigan State	7	–	11	.389	13	–	14	.481
Wisconsin	5	–	13	.278	11	–	16	.407
Northwestern	3	–	15	.167	9	–	18	.333
Rankings from AP Poll

The 1980–81 Iowa Hawkeyes men's basketball team represented the University of Iowa as members of the Big Ten Conference. The team was led by head coach Lute Olson, coaching in his 7th season at the school, and played their home games at the Iowa Field House. They finished the season 21–7 overall and 13–5 in Big Ten play. The Hawkeyes received an at-large bid to the NCAA Tournament as #3 seed in the Midwest Regional, but fell 60–56 to #6 seed Wichita State in the Round of 32 – a game played on the Shockers' home floor.

== Roster ==
1980–81 Iowa Hawkeyes men's basketball team
Players
Coaches

Pos.	#	Name	Height	Weight	Year	Hometown
G	15	Steve Carfino	6 ft 2 in (1.88 m)	—	Fr	Los Angeles, CA
G	24	Bob Hansen	6 ft 6 in (1.98 m)	—	So	Des Moines, IA
G	30	Kenny Arnold	6 ft 2 in (1.88 m)	—	Jr	Chicago, IL
F	32	Vince Brookins	6 ft 5 in (1.96 m)	—	Sr	Cleveland, OH
F	40	Kevin Boyle	6 ft 7 in (2.01 m)	—	Jr	Chicago, IL
F	44	Mark Gannon	6 ft 7 in (2.01 m)	—	So	Iowa City, IA
F/C	52	Steve Waite	6 ft 11 in (2.11 m)	—	Sr
C	54	Steve Krafcisin	6 ft 10 in (2.08 m)	—	Sr
G		Waymond King	6 ft 1 in (1.85 m)	—	Fr	Kansas City, MO

Head coach

- Lute Olson (Augsburg)

Assistant coach(es)

- Jim Rosborough (Iowa)
- Ken Burmeister (St. Mary's (TX))
- Scott Thompson (Iowa)

Legend

- (C) Team captain
- (S) Suspended
- (I) Ineligible
- (W) Walk-on
- Injured
- Current redshirt

== Schedule/results ==
Date time, TV	Rank^{#}	Opponent^{#}	Result	Record	Site city, state
Non-conference regular season
Nov 29, 1980*	No. 14	at Northern Illinois	W 61–47	1–0	Chick Evans Field House; DeKalb, Illinois
Dec 1, 1980*	No. 12	Detroit	W 98–55	2–0	Iowa Field House; Iowa City, Iowa
Dec 5, 1980*	No. 12	vs. Cincinnati	W 69–64	3–0	ASU Activity Center; Tempe, Arizona
Dec 6, 1980*	No. 12	at Arizona State	L 88–96	3–1	ASU Activity Center; Tempe, Arizona
Dec 9, 1980*	No. 16	Nevada	W 112–71	4–1	Iowa Field House; Iowa City, Iowa
Dec 13, 1980*	No. 16	at Drake "Big Four"	W 90–68	5–1	Veterans Memorial Auditorium; Des Moines, Iowa
Dec 20, 1980*	No. 16	Iowa State; Rivalry	W 85–59	6–1	Iowa Field House; Iowa City, IA
Dec 30, 1980*	No. 14	Northern Iowa "Big Four"	W 86–52	7–1	Iowa Field House; Iowa City, Iowa
Big Ten Regular Season
Jan 8, 1981	No. 11	Ohio State	L 56–58	7–2 (0–1)	Iowa Field House; Iowa City, Iowa
Jan 10, 1981	No. 11	Michigan State	W 65–57	8–2 (1–1)	Iowa Field House; Iowa City, Iowa
Jan 15, 1981	No. 14	at Wisconsin	W 76–66	9–2 (2–1)	Wisconsin Field House; Madison, Wisconsin
Jan 17, 1981	No. 14	at No. 9 Michigan	W 73–58	10–2 (3–1)	Crisler Arena; Ann Arbor, MI
Jan 22, 1981	No. 9	at Indiana	W 56–53	11–2 (4–1)	Assembly Hall; Bloomington, IN
Jan 24, 1981*	No. 9	Minnesota	L 48–60	11–3 (4–2)	Iowa Field House; Iowa City, Iowa
Jan 29, 1981	No. 13	Purdue	W 84–67	12–3 (5–2)	Iowa Field House; Iowa City, Iowa
Jan 31, 1981	No. 13	at Illinois; Rivalry	L 66–79	13–4 (5–3)	Assembly Hall; Champaign, Illinois
Feb 5, 1981	No. 15	at Northwestern	W 76–65	14–4 (6–3)	Welsh-Ryan Arena; Evanston, Illinois
Feb 7, 1981	No. 15	No. 18 Illinois; Rivalry	W 72–66	15–4 (7–3)	Iowa Field House; Iowa City, Iowa
Feb 12, 1981	No. 14	at Minnesota	W 60–58	16–4 (8–3)	Williams Arena; Minneapolis, Minnesota
Feb 14, 1981	No. 14	Northwestern	W 82–64	17–4 (9–3)	Iowa Field House; Iowa City, Iowa
Feb 19, 1981	No. 12	No. 16 Indiana	W 78–65	18–4 (10–3)	Iowa Field House; Iowa City, IA
Feb 21, 1981	No. 12	at Purdue	W 67–62	19–4 (11–3)	Mackey Arena; West Lafayette, Indiana
Feb 26, 1981	No. 8	Michigan	W 69–66	20–4 (12–3)	Iowa Field House; Iowa City, Iowa
Feb 28, 1981	No. 8	Wisconsin	W 96–75	21–4 (13–3)	Iowa Field House; Iowa City, Iowa
Mar 5, 1981	No. 8	at Michigan State	L 70–71	21–5 (13–4)	Jenison Field House; East Lansing, Michigan
Mar 7, 1981	No. 8	at Ohio State	L 70–78	21–6 (13–5)	St. John Arena; Columbus, Ohio
NCAA Tournament
3/15/1981*	(3 MW) No. 13	at (6 MW) Wichita State; Second Round	L 56–60	21–7	Levitt Arena; Wichita, KS
*Non-conference game. ^{#}Rankings from AP Poll. (#) Tournament seedings in parentheses.
