= Mike Boyd (basketball) =

American basketball coach

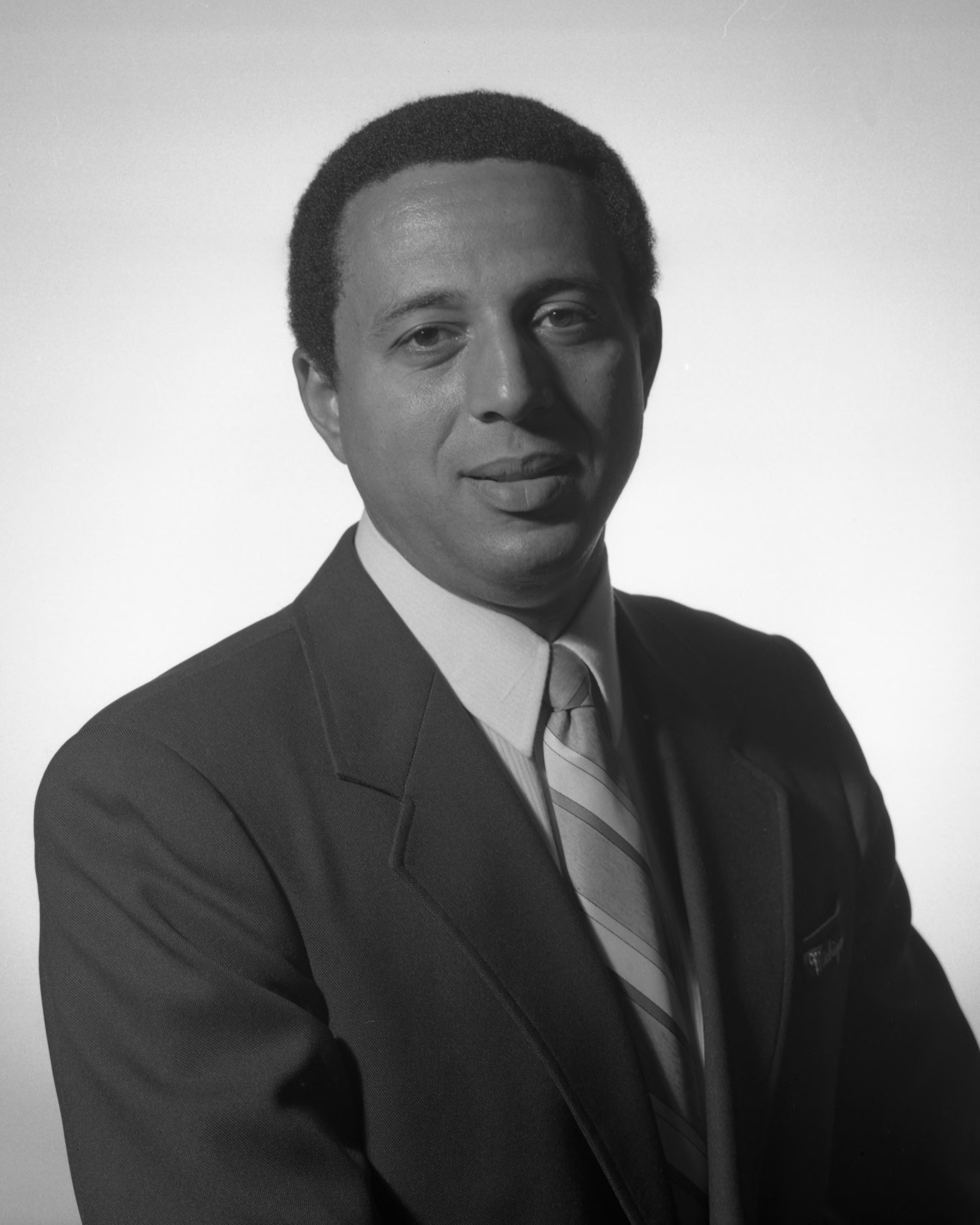
- Boyd in 1985

Biographical details
- Born: February 6, 1947 (age 79)

Playing career
- 1967–1970: Northern Michigan

Coaching career (HC unless noted)
- 197?–1978: Kent State (assistant)
- 1978: Kent State (interim HC)
- 1978–1990: Michigan (assistant)
- 1990–1996: Cleveland State
- 1996–2002: Penn State (assistant)
- 2002–2013: East Tennessee State (assistant)

Head coaching record
- Overall: 84–99 (.459)

Mike Boyd (born February 6, 1947) is an American basketball coach. He is a former Cleveland State University head coach, and is currently an assistant at East Tennessee State University. Boyd was hired at Cleveland State to replace Kevin Mackey in September 1990, and resigned on March 25, 1996. He has also been an interim head coach at Kent State, and an assistant coach at Kent State, Michigan, and Penn State. At the end of the 2012–13 season, Boyd retired from coaching.

== Head coaching record ==
Record table
| Season | Team | Overall | Conference | Standing | Postseason |
|---|---|---|---|---|---|
Kent State (Mid-American Conference) (1977–1978)
| 1977–78 | Kent State | 5–11 | 4–10 | | |
| Kent State: | | 5–11 | 4–10 | | |
Cleveland State (Mid-Continent Conference) (1990–1994)
| 1990–91 | Cleveland State | 12–16 | 8–8 | T–3rd | |
| 1991–92 | Cleveland State | 16–13 | 7–9 | T–6th | |
| 1992–93 | Cleveland State | 22–6 | 15–1 | 1st | |
| 1993–94 | Cleveland State | 14–15 | 9–9 | T–4th | |
Cleveland State (Midwestern Collegiate Conference) (1994–1996)
| 1994–95 | Cleveland State | 10–17 | 3–11 | 9th | |
| 1995–96 | Cleveland State | 5–21 | 3–13 | 9th | |
| Cleveland State: | | 79–88 | 36–51 | | |
| Total: | | 84–99 | | | |
National champion Postseason invitational champion Conference regular season champion Conference regular season and conference tournament champion Division regular season champion Division regular season and conference tournament champion Conference tournament champion
