= Jim Jarrett =

American college athletics administrator (1937–2025)

Biographical details
- Born: July 14, 1937; Decatur, Illinois, U.S.
- Died: November 13, 2025 (aged 88); Norfolk, Virginia, U.S.

Administrative career (AD unless noted)
- 1970–2010: Old Dominion

James Jarrett (July 14, 1937 – November 13, 2025) was an American college athletics administrator. He was the athletic director at Old Dominion University for 40 years, from 1970 to 2010. Jarrett attended Southern Illinois University on a tennis scholarship and later received a Ph.D. from Florida State University. He was first hired by Old Dominion as an associate professor in the physical education department. During his tenure, Old Dominion teams won 28 national championships, including women's basketball championships in 1979, 1980, and 1985, and field hockey championships in 1982, 1983, 1984, 1988, 1990, 1991, 1992, 1998, and 2000.

Jarrett died at his home in Norfolk, Virginia, on November 13, 2025, at the age of 88.
