= Dick Nagy =

American college basketball player and coach (1942–2021)

Biographical details
- Born: 1942; Syracuse, New York
- Died: October 6, 2021 (aged 78)

Playing career
- 1964-67: Hardin–Simmons

Coaching career (HC unless noted)
- 1967-69: Hardin–Simmons (asst.)
- 1969-76: Barton County
- 1979-96: Illinois (asst.)
- 1996-2001: UIC (asst.)

Administrative career (AD unless noted)
- 1973-76: Barton County

Dick Nagy was an American college basketball coach. Nagy was an assistant coach at the University of Illinois at Urbana-Champaign for 17 years. He founded and coached the basketball program for its first seven years at Barton County Community College and served as the school's Athletic Director from 1973 to 1976.
