= Don Sicko =

American basketball coach

Biographical details
- Born: July 28, 1946 (age 80)
- Education: Wayne State University

Coaching career (HC unless noted)
- 1968–1973: Archdiocese of Detroit Schools
- 1973–1979: Shrine High School
- 1979–1980: Kent State (assistant)
- 1980–1982: Michigan (assistant)
- 1982–1987: Detroit Mercy
- 2001–2005: Notre Dame High School

Head coaching record
- Overall: 57–88 (.393)

Accomplishments and honors

Awards
- MCC Coach of the Year (1986)

Don Sicko (born July 28, 1946) is an American former basketball coach, who was the head coach of the Detroit Mercy Titans.

== Coaching career ==
Sicko started his career coaching at Archdiocese of Detroit Schools as its head coach. From there he would become the head coach of Shrine High School. He then took an assistant coaching job at Kent State for a year, before becoming an assistant coach for the Michigan Wolverines. He coached with the Wolverines for two years. On March 4, 1982, he became the head coach of the Detroit Mercy Titans. He coached the Titans for five years, going 57-88 and winning the MCC Coach of the Year in 1986. However, after starting the 1987 season 0–3, Sicko resigned from his head coach position, claiming the reason for him stepping down due to coaching burnout after about 5 1/2 years, which included a 7–21 record during the previous season. He would return to coaching in 2001 taking the head coaching job at Notre Dame High School, where he would coach until 2005.
