= Gerry Gimelstob =

American basketball coach (1951–2017)

Biographical details
- Born: March 3, 1951; Newark, New Jersey, U.S.
- Died: March 18, 2017 (aged 66)

Playing career
- 1971–1973: Rhode Island

Coaching career (HC unless noted)
- 1973–1975; 1977–1981: Indiana (assistant)
- 1981–1985: George Washington

Head coaching record
- Overall: 58–55

Accomplishments and honors

Championships
- NCAA 1981 (Indiana)

Records
- Head coach USA men’s Maccabiah team Gold Medal winner 1985

Gerry Gimelstob (March 3, 1951 – March 18, 2017) was an American basketball head coach at the George Washington University from 1981 to 1985. Gimelstob came to George Washington from Indiana University Bloomington, where he was an assistant under Bob Knight. In his four seasons with the Colonials, Gimelstob compiled a 58–55 overall record, and coached NBA draftee Mike Brown. His best season was 1983– 1984, when the Colonials were 17–12. He was succeeded by John Kuester.

Gimelstob was an alumnus of the University of Rhode Island. He died of leukemia on March 18, 2017.
