= 1980–81 NCAA Division I men's basketball rankings =

- Season: 1980–81
- NCAA Tournament: 1981
- Preseason No. 1: Kentucky
- NCAA Tournament Champions: Indiana
NCAA Division I men's basketball rankings


he 1980–81 NCAA Division I men's basketball rankings consisted of two human polls, the ap poll and the Coaches Poll along with various other preseason polls.

== Legend ==
	Increase in ranking
	Decrease in ranking
	New to rankings from previous week
Italics	Number of first place votes
(#–#)	Win–loss record
т	Tied with team above or below also with this symbol

== AP Poll ==
The final writers' poll was released on Monday, March 9.

	Preseason	Week 1 Dec. 1	Week 2 Dec. 8	Week 3 Dec. 15	Week 4 Dec. 22	Week 5 Dec. 29	Week 6 Jan. 5	Week 7 Jan. 12	Week 8 Jan. 19	Week 9 Jan. 26	Week 10 Feb. 2	Week 11 Feb. 9	Week 12 Feb. 16	Week 13 Feb. 23	Week 14 Mar. 2	Final Mar. 9	
1.	Kentucky	DePaul (2–0)	DePaul (3–0)	DePaul (5–0)	DePaul (8–0)	DePaul (10–0)	DePaul (12–0)	Oregon State (12–0)	Oregon State (13–0)	Oregon State (15–0) т	Virginia (18–0)	Virginia (20–0)	Virginia (22–0)	Oregon State (23–0)	Oregon State (25–0)	DePaul (27–1) (55)	1.
2.	DePaul	Kentucky (1–0)	Kentucky (3–0)	Kentucky (4–0)	Kentucky (6–0)	Oregon State (8–0)	Oregon State (9–0)	Virginia (11–0)	Virginia (13–0)	Virginia (16–0) т	Oregon State (17–0)	Oregon State (19–0)	Oregon State (21–0)	LSU (26–1)	DePaul (25–1)	Oregon State (26–1) (5)	2.
3.	Louisville	UCLA (2–0)	UCLA (3–0)	UCLA (5–0)	UCLA (6–0)	Virginia (6–0)	Virginia (8–0)	Kentucky (10–1)	DePaul (15–1)	DePaul (16–1)	DePaul (18–1)	DePaul (21–1)	DePaul (22–1)	Virginia (23–1)	LSU (27–2)	Arizona State (24–3)	3.
4.	Maryland	Maryland (1–0)	Maryland (4–0)	Oregon State (5–0)	Oregon State (5–0)	Notre Dame (6–1)	Kentucky (8–1)	DePaul (13–1)	Wake Forest (14–0)	LSU (17–1)	LSU (19–1)	LSU (21–1)	LSU (23–1)	DePaul (24–1)	Virginia (24–3)	LSU (28–3)	4.
5.	Indiana	Indiana (2–0)	Oregon State (3–0)	Virginia (5–0)	Virginia (5–0)	Kentucky (6–1)	Notre Dame (7–1)	Wake Forest (12–0)	LSU (14–1)	Arizona State (14–2)	Arizona State (15–2)	Arizona State (18–2)	Wake Forest (21–2)	Arizona State (20–3)	Arizona State (22–3)	Virginia (25–3)	5.
6.	UCLA	Oregon State (1–0)	Virginia (4–0)	Notre Dame (4–1)	North Carolina (7–1)	North Carolina (9–1)	Wake Forest (10–0)	LSU (12–1)	Kentucky (11–2)	Wake Forest (15–1)	Kentucky (15–3)	Utah (20–1)	UCLA (16–4)	Notre Dame (20–4)	Notre Dame (22–4)	North Carolina (25–7)	6.
7.	Oregon State	Virginia (3–0)	Indiana (2–1)	Ohio State (2–1)	Wake Forest (8–0)	UCLA (6–1)	UCLA (7–1)	Notre Dame (8–2)	Arizona State (13–2)	Kentucky (13–3)	Utah (18–1)	Wake Forest (19–2)	Arizona State (19–3)	Utah (23–2)	Kentucky (22–4)	Notre Dame (22–5)	7.
8.	Virginia	Louisville (0–1)	Ohio State (2–1)	North Carolina (6–1)	Notre Dame (4–1)	Wake Forest (8–0)	Maryland (10–1)	UCLA (8–2)	Tennessee (12–2)	Notre Dame (12–3)	Wake Forest (17–2)	UCLA (14–4)	Tennessee (18–4)	Iowa (19–4)	Iowa (21–4)	Kentucky (22–5)	8.
9.	Ohio State	Ohio State (1–0)	Notre Dame (3–1)	Maryland (5–1)	Maryland (6–1)	Maryland (8–1)	LSU (10–1)	Michigan (10–1)	Iowa (11–2)	Utah (17–1)	Notre Dame (14–3)	Tennessee (16–4)	Utah (21–2)	Kentucky (20–4)	Utah (24–3)	Indiana (21–9)	9.
10.	Notre Dame	North Carolina (3–0)	North Carolina (5–1)	LSU (4–1)	LSU (6–1)	LSU (8–1)	Michigan (9–0)	Maryland (11–2)	Maryland (12–3)	UCLA (11–3)	Tennessee (15–3)	North Carolina (18–5)	Kentucky (18–4)	Tennessee (19–5)	Tennessee (20–6)	UCLA (20–6)	10.
11.	Missouri	Arkansas (2–1)	LSU (3–1)	Indiana (5–2)	Arizona State (6–0)	Texas A&M (7–1)	Iowa (8–1)	Tennessee (10–2)	South Alabama (15–1)	Tennessee (13–3)	North Carolina (16–4)	Kentucky (16–4)	Notre Dame (18–4)	North Carolina (21–6)	Wake Forest (22–5)	Wake Forest (22–6)	11.
12.	LSU	Iowa (2–0)	Texas A&M (2–0)	Wake Forest (6–0)	Texas A&M (7–0)	Michigan (7–0)	Illinois (8–1)	Arizona State (11–2)	UCLA (9–3)	North Carolina (14–4)	UCLA (12–4)	Notre Dame (16–4)	Iowa (17–4)	Wake Forest (21–4)	North Carolina (22–7)	Louisville (21–8) (1)	12.
13.	North Carolina	Notre Dame (0–1)	Wake Forest (4–0)	Texas A&M (5–0)	Michigan (7–0)	Arizona State (8–1)	Tennessee (9–1)	South Alabama (13–1)	Notre Dame (9–3)	Iowa (12–3)	Maryland (15–4)	Michigan (16–3)	North Carolina (19–6)	UCLA (17–5)	UCLA (18–6)	Iowa (21–6)	13.
14.	Iowa	Texas A&M (1–0)	Missouri (4–1)	Arizona State (5–0)	Iowa (6–1)	Iowa (6–1)	Arizona State (8–2)	Iowa (9–2)	Utah (15–1)	Maryland (13–4)	Michigan (14–3)	Iowa (15–4)	Wichita State (19–2)	Illinois (18–5)	Indiana (19–9)	Utah (24–4)	14.
15.	Texas A&M	LSU (2–1)	Arizona State (3–0)	Michigan (6–0)	Indiana (5–3)	Indiana (7–4)	South Alabama (10–1)	BYU (12–2)	Illinois (11–2)	BYU (15–3)	Iowa (13–4)	BYU (17–4)	Illinois (16–5)	BYU (20–5)	Arkansas (22–6)	Tennessee (20–7)	15.
16.	Georgetown	St. John's (2–0)	Iowa (3–1)	Iowa (5–1)	South Alabama (8–0)	Illinois (7–1)	North Carolina (9–3)	Utah (13–1)	Michigan (11–2)	South Alabama (16–2)	BYU (15–4)	Wichita State (18–2)	Indiana (16–8)	Indiana (17–9)	Illinois (19–6)	BYU (22–6)	16.
17.	St. John's	Missouri (2–1)	Arkansas (3–2)	Illinois (4–0)	Arkansas (6–2)	South Alabama (8–1)	BYU (10–2)	North Carolina (10–4)	North Carolina (12–4)	Michigan (12–3)	Indiana (13–7)	Illinois (14–5)	BYU (18–5)	Maryland (17–7)	Louisville (19–8)	Wyoming (23–5)	17.
18.	BYU	Syracuse (1–0)	Michigan (3–0)	BYU (4–1)	Illinois (5–1)	Tennessee (8–1)	Utah (11–1)	Illinois (9–2)	BYU (13–3)	Kansas (14–2)	Illinois (13–4)	South Alabama (19–3)	Michigan (16–5)	Arkansas (20–6)	BYU (21–6)	Maryland (20–9)	18.
19.	Syracuse	BYU (1–1)	BYU (2–1)	Arkansas (4–2)	Utah (7–0)	BYU (8–2)	Minnesota (9–1)	Clemson (12–2)	Clemson (13–3)	Minnesota (11–4)	Wichita State (16–2)	Maryland (15–6)	Lamar (20–2)	Wichita State (20–4)	Wyoming (21–5)	Illinois (20–7)	19.
20.	Arkansas	Georgetown (1–2)	Syracuse (2–1)	Louisville (1–3)	BYU (6–2)	Utah (9–1)	Clemson (11–1)	Minnesota (9–2)	Connecticut (12–1)	Connecticut (13–2)	South Alabama (17–3)	Indiana (14–8)	Maryland (16–7)	Louisville (17–8)	Maryland (18–8)	Arkansas (22–7)	20.
	Preseason	Week 1 Dec. 1	Week 2 Dec. 8	Week 3 Dec. 15	Week 4 Dec. 22	Week 5 Dec. 29	Week 6 Jan. 5	Week 7 Jan. 12	Week 8 Jan. 19	Week 9 Jan. 26	Week 10 Feb. 2	Week 11 Feb. 9	Week 12 Feb. 16	Week 13 Feb. 23	Week 14 Mar. 2	Final Mar. 9	
		None	Dropped: Louisville; St. John's; Georgetown (3–2)	Dropped: Missouri (5–2); Syracuse	Dropped: Ohio State; Louisville	Dropped: Arkansas	Dropped: Texas A&M; Indiana	None	Dropped: Minnesota	Dropped: Illinois; Clemson	Dropped: Kansas; Minnesota; Connecticut (15–3)	None	Dropped: South Alabama	Dropped: Michigan; Lamar	Dropped: Wichita State	None	

== UPI Poll ==
The final coaches' poll was released on Monday, March 9.

	Preseason	Week 2 Dec. 8	Week 3 Dec. 15	Week 4 Dec. 22	Week 5 Dec. 29	Week 6 Jan. 5	Week 7 Jan. 12	Week 8 Jan. 19	Week 9 Jan. 26	Week 10 Feb. 2	Week 11 Feb. 9	Week 12 Feb. 16	Week 13 Feb. 23	Week 14 Mar. 2	Final Mar. 9	
1.	Kentucky	Kentucky (3–0)	Kentucky (4–0)	Kentucky (6–0)	DePaul (10–0)	DePaul (12–0)	Oregon State (12–0)	Oregon State (13–0)	Oregon State (15–0)	Oregon State (17–0)	Oregon State (19–0)	Oregon State (21–0)	Oregon State (23–0)	Oregon State (25–0)	DePaul (27–1) (35)	1.
2.	DePaul	DePaul (3–0)	DePaul (5–0)	DePaul (8–0)	Oregon State (8–0)	Oregon State (9–0)	Virginia (11–0)	Virginia (13–0)	Virginia (16–0)	Virginia (18–0)	Virginia (20–0)	Virginia (22–0)	DePaul (24–1)	DePaul (25–1)	Oregon State (26–1) (6)	2.
3.	Louisville	UCLA (3–0)	UCLA (5–0)	UCLA (6–0)	Kentucky (6–1)	Kentucky (8–1)	DePaul (13–1)	DePaul (15–1)	DePaul (16–1)	DePaul (18–1)	DePaul (21–1)	DePaul (22–1)	Virginia (23–1)	LSU (27–2)	Virginia (25–3)	3.
4.	Indiana	Maryland (4–0)	Oregon State (5–0)	Oregon State (5–0)	Virginia (6–0)	Virginia (8–0)	Kentucky (10–1)	Wake Forest (14–0)	LSU (17–1)	LSU (19–1)	LSU (21–1)	LSU (23–1)	LSU (26–1)	Virginia (24–2)	LSU (28–3)	4.
5.	Maryland	Oregon State (3–0)	Virginia (5–0)	Virginia (5–0)	Notre Dame (6–1)	Notre Dame (7–1)	Wake Forest (12–0)	LSU (14–1)	Kentucky (13–3)	Arizona State (15–2)	Arizona State (18–2)	Wake Forest (21–2)	Arizona State (20–3)	Arizona State (22–3)	Arizona State (24–3) (1)	5.
6.	Oregon State	Indiana (2–1)	North Carolina (6–1)	Arizona State (6–0)	North Carolina (9–1)	UCLA (7–1)	LSU (12–1)	Kentucky (11–2)	Wake Forest (15–1)	Kentucky (15–3)	Utah (20–1)	UCLA (16–4)	Notre Dame (20–4)	Iowa (21–4)	North Carolina (25–7)	6.
7.	Virginia	Virginia (4–0)	Indiana (5–2)	North Carolina (7–1)	UCLA (6–1)	Wake Forest (10–0)	Maryland (11–2)	Maryland (12–3)	Arizona State (14–2)	Utah (18–1)	Wake Forest (19–2)	Utah (21–2)	Utah (23–2)	Notre Dame (22–4)	Indiana (21–9)	7.
8.	UCLA	North Carolina (5–1)	Wake Forest (6–0)	Wake Forest (8–0)	Wake Forest (8–0)	Maryland (10–1)	Michigan (10–1)	Iowa (11–2)	Utah (17–1)	Wake Forest (17–2)	Tennessee (16–4)	Arizona State (19–3)	Iowa (19–4)	Kentucky (22–4)	Kentucky (22–5)	8.
9.	Ohio State	Ohio State (2–1)	Maryland (5–1)	Maryland (6–1)	Maryland (8–1)	Michigan (9–0)	UCLA (8–2)	Arizona State (13–2)	Notre Dame (12–3)	Notre Dame (14–3)	North Carolina (18–5)	Tennessee (18–4)	Kentucky (20–4)	Utah (24–3)	Notre Dame (22–5)	9.
10.	Missouri	Wake Forest (4–0)	Ohio State (2–1)	Texas A&M (7–0)	Arizona State (8–1)	LSU (10–1)	Notre Dame (8–2)	South Alabama (15–1)	UCLA (11–3)	North Carolina (16–4)	UCLA (14–4)	Kentucky (18–4)	North Carolina (21–6)	Wake Forest (22–5)	Utah (24–4)	10.
11.	North Carolina	LSU (3–1)	Notre Dame (4–1)	Notre Dame (4–1)	LSU (8–1)	Iowa (8–1)	South Alabama (13–1)	Utah (15–1)	North Carolina (14–4)	Maryland (15–4)	Kentucky (16–4)	Notre Dame (18–4)	Wake Forest (21–4)	North Carolina (22–7)	UCLA (20–6)	11.
12.	Notre Dame	Texas A&M (2–0)	LSU (4–1)	LSU (6–1)	Texas A&M (7–1)	Tennessee (9–1)	Tennessee (10–2)	Tennessee (12–2)	Iowa (12–3)	Tennessee (15–3)	Michigan (16–3)	Iowa (17–4)	Tennessee (19–5)	Tennessee (20–6)	Iowa (21–6)	12.
13.	LSU	Notre Dame (3–1)	Arizona State (5–0)	Michigan (7–0)	Michigan (7–0)	North Carolina (9–3)	BYU (12–2)	Notre Dame (9–3)	Maryland (13–4)	Indiana (13–7)	Iowa (15–4)	North Carolina (19–6)	UCLA (17–5)	Indiana (19–9)	Louisville (21–8)	13.
14.	Texas A&M	Missouri (4–1)	Texas A&M (5–0)	Iowa (6–1)	Indiana (7–4)	Minnesota (9–1)	Arizona State (11–2)	UCLA (9–3)	South Alabama (16–2)	UCLA (12–4)	Notre Dame (16–4)	Indiana (16–8)	Illinois (18–5)	UCLA (18–6)	Wake Forest (22–6)	14.
15.	Iowa	Iowa (3–1)	Iowa (5–1)	Utah (7–0)	Iowa (6–1)	South Alabama (10–1)	Utah (13–1)	Illinois (11–2)	Tennessee (13–3)	Michigan (14–3)	Indiana (14–8)	Wichita State (19–2)	Indiana (17–9)	Arkansas (22–6)	Tennessee (20–7)	15.
16.	Georgetown	Michigan (3–0)	Illinois (4–0)	Indiana (5–3)	Illinois (7–1)	Illinois (8–1)	Iowa (9–2)	Michigan (11–2)	BYU (15–3)	Iowa (13–4)	Maryland (15–6)	Idaho (20–3)	Arkansas (20–6)	Wyoming (21–6)	Wyoming (23–5)	16.
17.	BYU	BYU (2–1)	Michigan (6–0)	South Alabama (8–0)	South Alabama (8–1)	Arizona State (8–2)	North Carolina (10–4)	Connecticut (12–1)	Indiana (11–7)	South Alabama (17–3)	BYU (17–4)	Arkansas (18–6)	Idaho (22–3)	Illinois (19–6)	BYU (22–6)	17.
18.	Kansas State	Georgetown (2–1)	Louisville (1–3)	BYU (6–2)	Tennessee (8–1)	BYU (10–2)	Connecticut (10–0)	North Carolina (12–4)	Kansas (14–2)	Connecticut (15–3)	South Alabama (19–3)	Illinois (16–5)	Wichita State (20–4)	Louisville (19–8)	Illinois (20–7)	18.
19.	St. John's	Minnesota (3–0)	BYU (4–1)	Tennessee (6–1)	BYU (8–2)	Utah (11–1)	Indiana (9–5)	Indiana (10–6)	Connecticut (13–2)	BYU (15–4)	Wichita State (18–2)	BYU (18–5) т	BYU (20–5)	BYU (21–6)	Kansas (19–7)	19.
20.	Syracuse т Arizona State т	Arizona State (3–0)	Missouri (5–2)	Arkansas (6–2)	Utah (9–1)	Clemson (11–1)	Minnesota (9–2)	Kansas (12–2)	Michigan (12–3)	Wichita State (16–2)	Idaho (19–3)	Kansas State (17–5) т	Maryland (17–7)	Missouri (21–8)	Maryland (20–9)	20.
	Preseason	Week 2 Dec. 8	Week 3 Dec. 15	Week 4 Dec. 22	Week 5 Dec. 29	Week 6 Jan. 5	Week 7 Jan. 12	Week 8 Jan. 19	Week 9 Jan. 26	Week 10 Feb. 2	Week 11 Feb. 9	Week 12 Feb. 16	Week 13 Feb. 23	Week 14 Mar. 2	Final Mar. 9	
		Dropped: Louisville (0–3); Kansas State; St. John's; Syracuse (2–1)	Dropped: Georgetown	Dropped: Ohio State; Illinois (5–1); Louisville (1–4); Missouri	Dropped: Arkansas	Dropped: Indiana; Texas A&M	Dropped: Illinois (9–2); Clemson (12–2)	Dropped: BYU (13–3); Minnesota	Dropped: Illinois	Dropped: Kansas	Dropped: Connecticut	Dropped: Michigan (16–5); Maryland (16–7); South Alabama	Dropped: Kansas State	Dropped: Idaho; Wichita State (21–5); Maryland (18–8)	Dropped: Arkansas (22–7); Missouri (22–9)	
