= Jenison Fieldhouse =

Arena at Michigan State University, US

Coordinates: 42.730843°N 84.489928°W

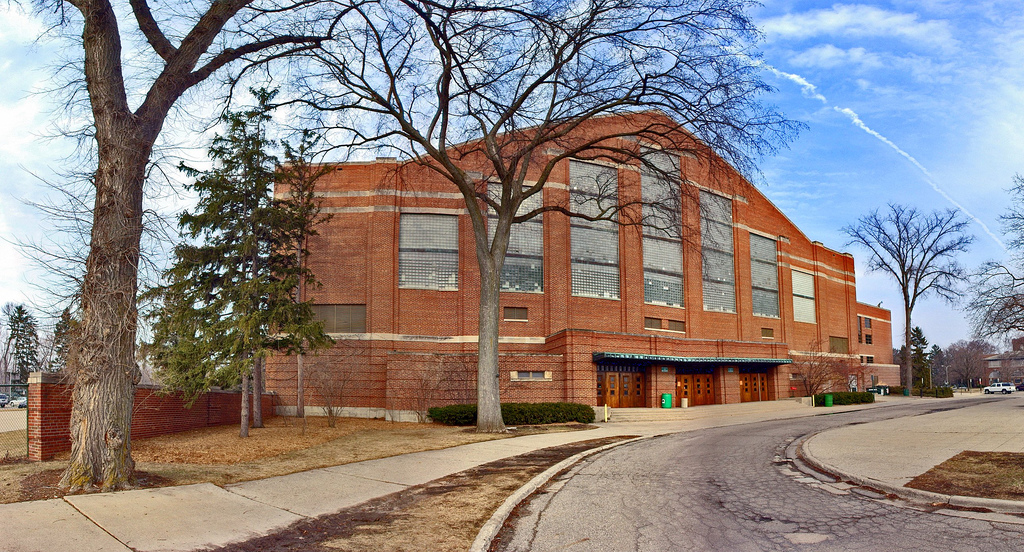
- Rear of Jenison Fieldhouse in 2006
- Interactive map of Jenison Fieldhouse
- Location: 248 Jenison Field House, East Lansing, 48824
- Owner: Michigan State University
- Operator: Michigan State University
- Capacity: 6,000 (current); 10,004 (previous); 12,500 (1940–early 1970s)

Construction
- Opened: 1940

Tenants
- Michigan State Spartans (wrestling, track and field, volleyball, gymnastics)

Jenison Fieldhouse (alternately referred to in university publications as Jenison Field House) is a 10,004-seat, later reduced to 6,000-seat, multi-purpose arena in East Lansing, Michigan. The arena opened in 1940 and was named for alumnus Frederick Cowles Jenison, whose estate, along with PWAP funds, funded the building. It was home to the Michigan State University Spartans basketball team before they moved to Breslin Center in the fall of 1989. Previously Michigan State College (MSC) basketball had played home games at Demonstration Hall and the IM Circle (then known as College Gymnasium) buildings.

Seating capacity at Jenison was rated at 12,500 from its opening until the early 1970s when rulings by the state fire marshal reduced the limit to 9,886 (later recalculated at 10,004). Standing-room only admissions allowed some Jenison crowds to exceed 15,000 in the 1940s, but rated capacity was rarely exceeded after 1950.

The venue is most famous for its 1978–79 NCAA champion basketball team, which included Earvin "Magic" Johnson, and was coached by Jud Heathcote. Michigan State also qualified for the Final Four in 1957, and Jenison also hosted the 1963 NCAA basketball tournament Mideast Regionals. A plaque outside the arena commemorates one of the 1963 regional semifinals; the "Game of Change", in which a segregated Mississippi State team played and lost to the eventual national champion, an integrated Loyola team. The losing Maroons (now known as the Bulldogs) had defied a court order prohibiting them from leaving the state to play an integrated team. The game is now seen as a watershed moment in the intersection of civil rights and sports during the Civil Rights Movement.

The three-story building's architecture is late art deco, with a monumental entrance that includes three reliefs of a baseball player, basketball player, and football player above the three main doors. Locker room facilities at Jenison have also been used for Spartan baseball and softball teams, which compete at the adjacent outdoor venues Kobs Field and Old College Field.

During its first 30 years of service, Jenison Fieldhouse featured a dirt surface, with a hardwood basketball court elevated about a foot over floor level. The building was also used for indoor track and occasionally as an indoor football practice facility. A Tartan indoor track and basketball floor surface was installed in 1970, although a portable hardwood floor was used for basketball games from 1980 to 1989.

Following the move of Spartan basketball teams to the Breslin Center, Jenison Fieldhouse was reconfigured and renovated to host numerous other university athletic activities. The Fieldhouse is currently where the gymnastics, wrestling, and indoor track and field teams compete. It is also the second home for the women’s volleyball team when there is a conflict at the Breslin Center. It also contains Athletic Department offices.

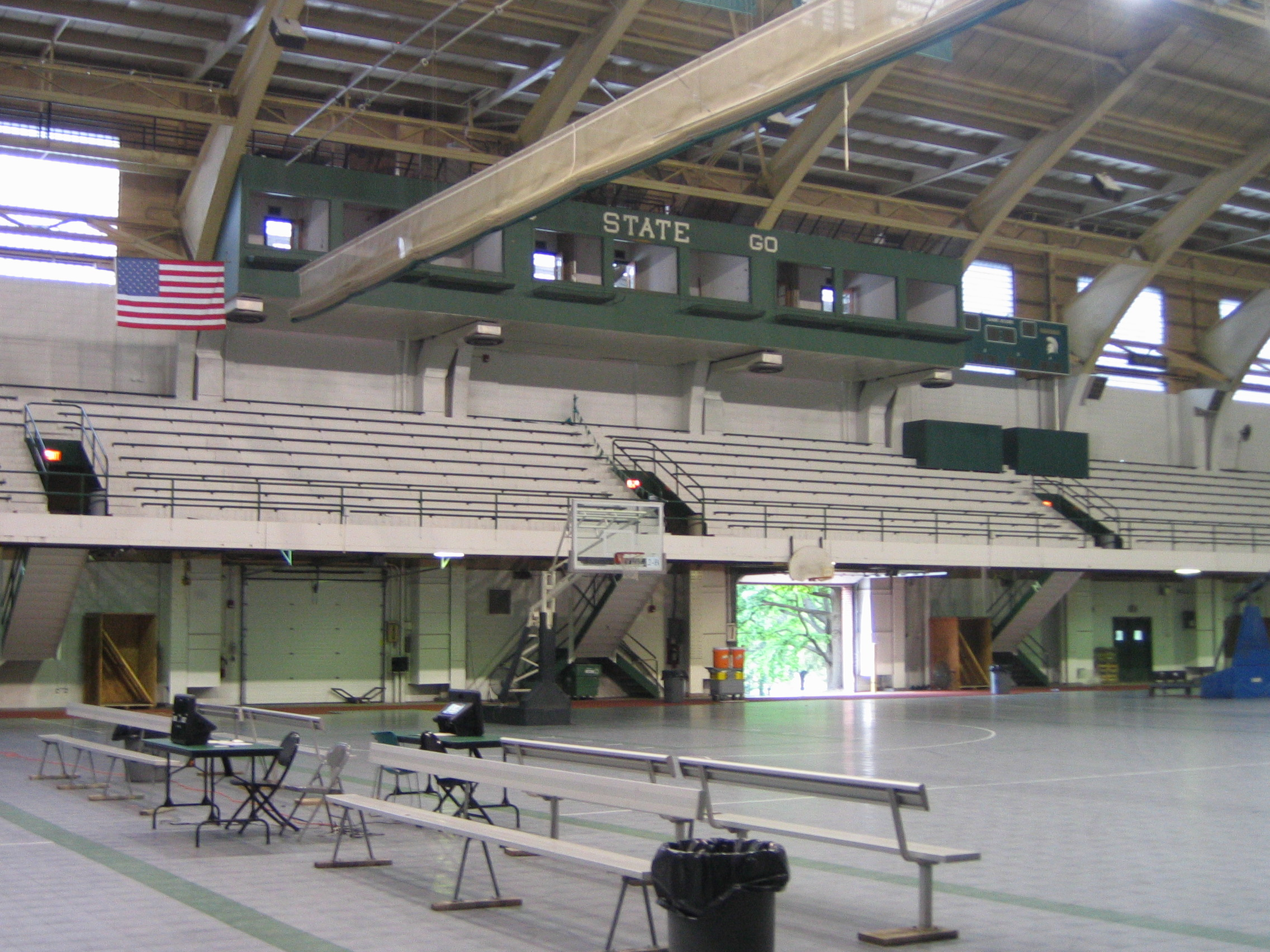
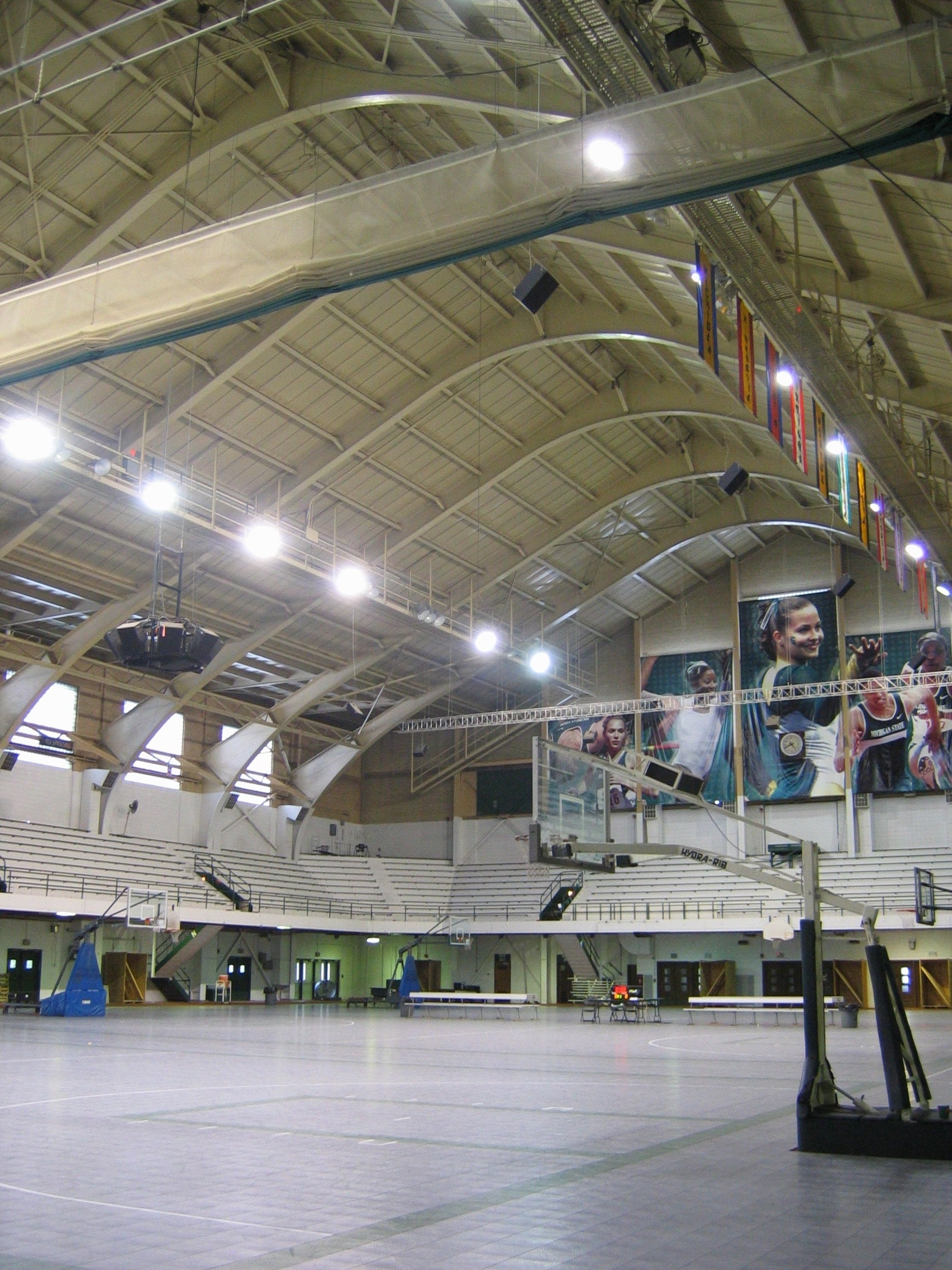
The fieldhouse's interior in 2008
