= List of Ole Miss Rebels men's basketball seasons =

This is a list of seasons completed by the Ole Miss Rebels men's basketball team.

== Yearly record ==
Record table
Season	Coach	Overall	Conference	Standing	Postseason
No coach (Independent) (1908–1910)
1908–09	No coach	1–4			
1909–10	No coach	0–7			
E.R. Hubbard (Independent) (1910–1911)
1910–11	E.R. Hubbard	9–3			
By Walton (Independent) (1911–1912)
1911–12	By Walton	10–2			
No coach (Independent) (1912–1917)
1912–13	No coach	0–7			
1913–14	No coach	8–7			
1914–15	No coach	0–3			
1915–16	No coach	4–7			
1916–17	No coach	11–7			
Dudy Noble (Southern Intercollegiate Athletic Association) (1918–1919)
1918–19	Dudy Noble	0–3			
R. L. Sullivan (Southern Intercollegiate Athletic Association) (1919–1922)
1919–20	R. L. Sullivan	9–4			
1920–21	R.L. Sullivan	9–7			
1921–22	R.L. Sullivan	7–4			
R.L. Sullivan (Southern Conference) (1922–1925)
1922–23	R.L. Sullivan	8–7	2–4	12th	
1923–24	R.L. Sullivan	16–6	2–4	T–11th	
1924–25	R.L. Sullivan	17–8	1–6	19th	
Homer Hazel (Southern Conference) (1925–1930)
1925–26	Homer Hazel	16–2	8–1	3rd	
1926–27	Homer Hazel	13–5	10–4	6th	
1927–28	Homer Hazel	10–9	5–9	13th	
1928–29	Homer Hazel	9–9	7–8	12th	
1929–30	Homer Hazel	6–7	6–6	12th	
Ed Walker (Southern Conference) (1930–1932)
1930–31	Ed Walker	6–9	2–4	18th	
1931–32	Ed Walker	9–6	8–5	8th	
Ed Walker (Southeastern Conference) (1932–1935)
1932–33	Ed Walker	6–12	5–7	8th	
1933–34	Ed Walker	7–9	2–8	11th	
1934–35	Ed Walker	8–10	5–7	10th	
George Bohler (Southeastern Conference) (1935–1938)
1935–36	George Bohler	11–9	7–5	T–8th	
1936–37	George Bohler	20–6	7–3	3rd	
1937–38	George Bohler	22–12	11–2	2nd	
Frank Johnson (Southeastern Conference) (1938–1939)
1938–39	Frank Johnson	10–16	4–10	12th	
Chuck Jaskwhich (Southeastern Conference) (1939–1942)
1939–40	Chuck Jaskwhich	9–10	3–8	11th	
1940–41	Chuck Jaskwhich	2–18	2–15	12th	
1941–42	Chuck Jaskwhich	4–15	3–12	12th	
Edwin Hale (Southeastern Conference) (1942–1945)
1942–43	Edwin Hale	8–10	6–8	8th	
1944–45	Edwin Hale	15–8	3–1	3rd	
Jim Poole (Southeastern Conference) (1945–1946)
1945–46	Jim Poole	8–11	2–8	11th	
Jim Whatley (Southeastern Conference) (1946–1949)
1946–47	Jim Whatley	7–14	2–11	11th	
1947–48	Jim Whatley	11–12	5–9	10th	
1948–49	Jim Whatley	8–13	4–12	11th	
B. L. Graham (Southeastern Conference) (1949–1962)
1949–50	B. L. Graham	8–17	4–13	12th	
1950–51	B. L. Graham	12–12	5–9	10th	
1951–52	B. L. Graham	15–11	8–6	5th	
1952–53	B. L. Graham	14–11	5–8	7th	
1953–54	B. L. Graham	12–12	7–7	6th	
1954–55	B. L. Graham	8–15	5–9	9th	
1955–56	B. L. Graham	10–13	4–10	10th	
1956–57	B. L. Graham	9–12	4–10	10th	
1957–58	B. L. Graham	12–12	6–8	8th	
1958–59	B. L. Graham	7–17	1–13	12th	
1959–60	B. L. Graham	15–9	8–6	4th	
1960–61	B. L. Graham	10–14	5–9	9th	
1961–62	B. L. Graham	12–13	5–9	9th	
Eddie Crawford (Southeastern Conference) (1962–1968)
1962–63	Eddie Crawford	7–17	4–10	T–10th	
1963–64	Eddie Crawford	10–12	7–7	T–7th	
1964–65	Eddie Crawford	4–21	1–15	11th	
1965–66	Eddie Crawford	5–18	2–14	T–10th	
1966–67	Eddie Crawford	13–12	7–11	7th	
1967–68	Eddie Crawford	7–17	4–14	9th	
Cob Jarvis (Southeastern Conference) (1968–1976)
1968–69	Cob Jarvis	10–14	7–11	T–7th	
1969–70	Cob Jarvis	10–15	6–12	T–7th	
1970–71	Cob Jarvis	11–15	6–12	T–8th	
1971–72	Cob Jarvis	13–12	8–10	6th	
1972–73	Cob Jarvis	14–12	8–10	6th	
1973–74	Cob Jarvis	15–10	9–9	T–4th	
1974–75	Cob Jarvis	8–18	4–14	9th	
1975–76	Cob Jarvis	6–21	2–16	12th	
1976–77	Cob Jarvis	11–16	5–13	9th	
1977–78	Cob Jarvis	10–17	5–13	T–9th	
Bob Weltlich (Southeastern Conference) (1976–1982)
1976–77	Bob Weltlich	11–16	5–13	9th	
1977–78	Bob Weltlich	10–17	5–13	9th	
1978–79	Bob Weltlich	11–16	6–12	8th	
1979–80	Bob Weltlich	17–13	9–9	5th	
1980–81	Bob Weltlich	16–14	8–10	6th	NCAA Division I first round
1981–82	Bob Weltlich	18–12	11–7	4th	
Lee Hunt (Southeastern Conference) (1982–1986)
1982–83	Lee Hunt	19–12	10–8	T–2nd	
1983–84	Lee Hunt	8–20	3–15	10th	
1984–85	Lee Hunt	11–17	5–13	9th	
1985–86	Lee Hunt	12–17	4–14	9th	
Ed Murphy (Southeastern Conference) (1986–1992)
1986–87	Ed Murphy	15–14	8–10	T–6th	
1987–88	Ed Murphy	13–16	6–12	T–8th	
1988–89	Ed Murphy	15–15	8–10	T–6th	
1989–90	Ed Murphy	13–17	8–10	T–6th	
1990–91	Ed Murphy	9–19	3–15	T–9th	
1991–92	Ed Murphy	11–17	4–12	6th (west))	
Rob Evans (Southeastern Conference) (1992–1998)
1992–93	Rob Evans	10–18	4–12	6th (West)	
1993–94	Rob Evans	14–13	7–9	4th (West)	
1994–95	Rob Evans	8–19	3–13	6th (West)	
1995–96	Rob Evans	12–15	6–10	T–4th (West)	
1996–97	Rob Evans	20–9	11–5	1st (West)	NCAA Division I first round
1997–98	Rob Evans	22–7	12–4	1st (West)	NCAA Division I first round
Rod Barnes (Southeastern Conference) (1998–2006)
1998–99	Rod Barnes	20–13	8–8	T–3rd (West)	NCAA Division I second round
1999–00	Rod Barnes	19–14	5–11	T–5th (West)	NIT Quarterfinal
2000–01	Rod Barnes	27–8	11–5	1st (West)	NCAA Division I Sweet Sixteen
2001–02	Rod Barnes	20–11	9–7	3rd (West)	NCAA Division I first round
2002–03	Rod Barnes	14–15	4–12	T–5th (West)	
2003–04	Rod Barnes	13–15	5–11	T–4th (West)	
2004–05	Rod Barnes	14–17	4–12	T–5th (West)	
2005–06	Rod Barnes	14–16	4–12	T–5th (West)	
Andy Kennedy (Southeastern Conference) (2006–2018)
2006–07	Andy Kennedy	21–13	8–8	T–1st (West)	NIT second round
2007–08	Andy Kennedy	24–11	7–9	3rd (West)	NIT Semifinal
2008–09	Andy Kennedy	16–15	7–9	T–4th (West)	
2009–10	Andy Kennedy	24–11	9–7	T–1st (West)	NIT Semifinal
2010–11	Andy Kennedy	20–14	7–9	T–3rd (West)	NIT first round
2011–12	Andy Kennedy	20–14	8–8	T–6th	NIT first round
2012–13	Andy Kennedy	27–9	12–6	T–2nd	NCAA Division I second round
2013–14	Andy Kennedy	19–14	9–9	T–6th	
2014–15	Andy Kennedy	21–13	11–7	T–3rd	NCAA Division I first round
2015–16	Andy Kennedy	20–12	10–8	T–6th	
2016–17	Andy Kennedy	22–14	10–8	T–5th	NIT Quarterfinal
2017–18	Andy Kennedy; Tony Madlock	12–20^{[Note A]}	5–13^{[Note A]}	14th	
Kermit Davis (Southeastern Conference) (2018–2023)
2018–19	Kermit Davis	20–13	10–8	T–6th	NCAA Division I first round
2019–20	Kermit Davis	15–17	6–12	12th	No postseason held
2020–21	Kermit Davis	16–12	10–8	6th	NIT first round
2021–22	Kermit Davis	13–19	4–14	13th	
2022–23	Kermit Davis; Win Case	12–21^{[Note B]}	4–14^{[Note B]}	13th	
Chris Beard (Southeastern Conference) (2023–present)
2023–24	Chris Beard	20–12	7–11	10th	
2024–25	Chris Beard	24–12	10–8	T–6th	NCAA Division I Sweet 16
2025–26	Chris Beard	15–20	4–14	T–14th	
Total:		1,428–1,427			
National champion Postseason invitational champion Conference regular season champion Conference regular season and conference tournament champion Division regular season champion Division regular season and conference tournament champion Conference tournament champion

^A. Kennedy coached the first 27 games of the season, going 11–16 and 4–10 in conference. Madlock finished the season, going 1–4 and 1–3 in conference
^B. Davis coached the first 28 games of the season, going 10–18 and 2–13 in conference. Case finished the season, going 2–3 and 1–2 in conference
