= List of Ole Miss Rebels men's basketball head coaches =

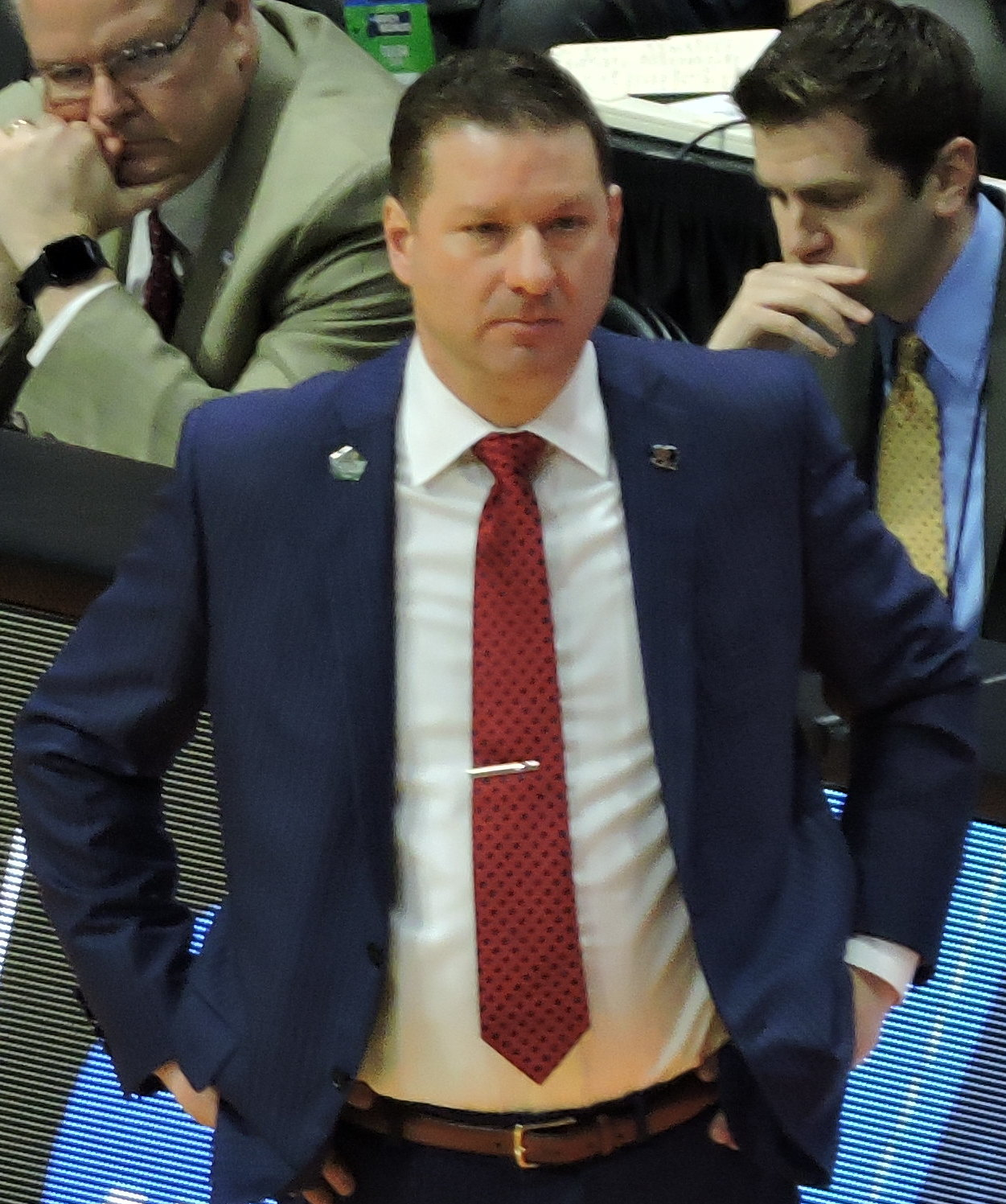
Chris Beard, the current head coach of the Ole Miss Rebels.

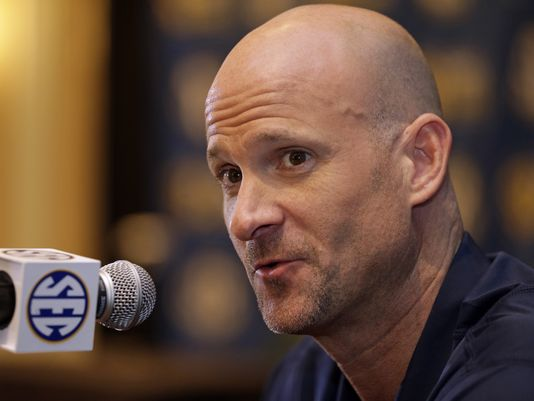
Andy Kennedy, the winningest head coach in Rebels men's basketball history.

The following is a list of Ole Miss Rebels men's basketball head coaches. There have been 23 head coaches of the Rebels in their 113-season history.

Ole Miss' current head coach is Chris Beard. He was hired as the Rebels' head coach in March 2023, replacing Kermit Davis, who was fired during the 2022–23 season.

No.	Tenure	Coach	Years	Record	Pct.
–	1908–1910; 1912–1917	No coach	7	24–42	.364
1	1910–1911	E. R. Hubbard	1	9–3	.750
2	1911–1912	By Walton	1	10–2	.833
3	1918–1919	Dudy Noble	1	0–3	.000
4	1919–1925	R. L. Sullivan	6	66–36	.647
5	1925–1930	Homer Hazel	5	54–32	.628
6	1930–1935	Ed Walker	5	36–46	.439
7	1935–1938	George Bohler	3	53–27	.663
8	1938–1939	Frank Johnson	1	10–16	.385
9	1939–1942	Chuck Jaskwhich	3	15–43	.259
10	1942–1945 (Note: Ole Miss did not field a team for the 1943–44 season due to World War II.)	Edwin Hale	2	23–18	.561
11	1945–1946	Buster Poole	1	8–11	.421
12	1946–1949	Jim Whatley	3	26–39	.400
13	1949–1962	B. L. Graham	13	144–168	.462
14	1962–1968	Eddie Crawford	6	46–97	.322
15	1968–1976	Cob Jarvis	8	87–117	.426
16	1976–1982	Bob Weltlich	6	83–88	.485
17	1982–1986	Lee Hunt	4	50–66	.431
18	1986–1992	Ed Murphy	6	76–98	.437
19	1992–1998	Rob Evans	6	86–81	.515
20	1998–2006	Rod Barnes	8	141–109	.564
21	2006–2018 (Note: Kennedy resigned on February 18, 2018. Tony Madlock served as interim head coach for the remainder of the 2017–18 season.)	Andy Kennedy	12	245–156	.611
–	2018*	Tony Madlock	1	1–4	.200
22	2018–2023 (Note: Davis was fired on February 24, 2023. Win Case served as interim head coach for the remainder of the 2022–23 season.)	Kermit Davis	5	74–79	.484
–	2023*	Win Case	1	2–3	.400
23	2023–present	Chris Beard	2	35–14	.714
Totals		23 coaches	113 seasons	1,369–1,384	.497
Records updated through end of 2022–23 season * - Denotes interim head coach. Source
