= 1980–81 Auburn Tigers men's basketball team =

American college basketball season

1980–81 Auburn Tigers men's basketball
- Conference: Southeastern Conference
- Record: 9–16 (4–14 SEC)
- Head coach: Sonny Smith (3rd season)
- Assistant coaches: Herbert Greene; Mack McCarthy; Herman Williams
- Home arena: Memorial Coliseum

1980–81 Southeastern Conference men's basketball standings
	Conf.				Overall
Team	W		L	PCT	W		L	PCT
No. 4 LSU	17	–	1	.944	31	–	5	.861
No. 8 Kentucky	15	–	3	.833	22	–	6	.786
No. 15 Tennessee	12	–	6	.667	21	–	8	.724
Alabama	10	–	8	.556	18	–	11	.621
Georgia	9	–	9	.500	19	–	12	.613
Ole Miss †	8	–	10	.444	16	–	14	.533
Vanderbilt	7	–	11	.389	15	–	14	.517
Florida	5	–	13	.278	12	–	16	.429
Auburn	4	–	14	.222	11	–	16	.407
Mississippi State	3	–	15	.167	8	–	19	.296
† 1981 SEC tournament winner Rankings from AP Poll

The 1980–81 Auburn Tigers men's basketball team represented Auburn University in the 1980–81 college basketball season. The team was coached by Sonny Smith, who was in his third season.

Newcomers to the team this season included freshman signees Greg Turner, Mark Cahill, and Paul Daniels. The team lost captains Bubba Price and Rich Valavicius, who graduated.

The team played their home games at Memorial Coliseum in Auburn, Alabama. They finished the season 9–16, 4–14 in SEC play. They lost to Florida in the first round of the 1981 SEC Men's Basketball Tournament.

== Roster ==
1980–81 Auburn Tigers men's basketball team
Players
Coaches

Pos.	#	Name	Height	Weight	Year	Previous school	Hometown
G	22	Eric Stringer	6 ft 1 in (1.85 m)	185 lb (84 kg)	Sr	Oxford High School	Hobson City, AL
F	44	Earl Banks	6 ft 7 in (2.01 m)	220 lb (100 kg)	Sr	Holy Family High School	Birmingham, AL
C	45	Bobby Cattage	6 ft 9 in (2.06 m)	250 lb (113 kg)	Sr	J.O. Johnson High School	Huntsville, AL
C	32	Darrell Lockhart	6 ft 9 in (2.06 m)	240 lb (109 kg)	So	Robert E. Lee High School	Thomaston, GA
C	33	Frank Poindexter	6 ft 6 in (1.98 m)	—	So
G	23	Alvin Mumphord	6 ft 4 in (1.93 m)	—	So
G	3	Byron Henson	6 ft 3 in (1.91 m)	—	So
F	11	Greg Turner	6 ft 7 in (2.01 m)	—	Fr	Tuskegee High School	Tuskegee, AL
F	21	Mark Cahill	6 ft 8 in (2.03 m)	—	Fr	Stone Mountain High School	Stone Mountain, GA
G	00	Paul Daniels	6 ft 3 in (1.91 m)	—	Fr	Warner Christian	Ormond Beach, FL

Head coach

- Sonny Smith

Assistant coach(es)

- Herbert Greene
- Mack McCarthy
- Herman Williams

Legend

- (C) Team captain
- (S) Suspended
- (I) Ineligible
- (W) Walk-on
- Injured
- Current redshirt

== Schedule and results ==
Date time, TV	Rank^{#}	Opponent^{#}	Result	Record	Site city, state
Regular Season
December 1, 1980*		Towson	W 87–63	1–0	Memorial Coliseum; Auburn, Alabama
December 3, 1980		Tennessee	W 75–65	2–0 (1–0)	Memorial Coliseum; Auburn, Alabama
December 8, 1980*		Tennessee Tech	W 77–62	3–0 (1–0)	Memorial Coliseum; Auburn, Alabama
December 17, 1980*		Florida State	W 78–74	4–0 (1–0)	Memorial Coliseum; Auburn, Alabama
December 20, 1980*		Austin Peay	W 52–51	5–0 (1–0)	Dunn Center; Clarksville, Tennessee
December 29, 1980*		Air Force	L 46–48 ^{OT}	5–1 (1–0)	John F. Savage Hall; Toledo, Ohio
December 30, 1980*		Columbia	W 63–55	6–1 (1–0)	John F. Savage Hall; Toledo, Ohio
January 3, 1981		Ole Miss	L 45–46	6–2 (1–1)	Tad Smith Coliseum; Oxford, Mississippi
January 7, 1981		No. 4 Kentucky	L 66–79	6–3 (1–2)	Memorial Coliseum; Auburn, Alabama
January 10, 1981		Florida	L 59–63	6–4 (1–3)	O'Connell Center; Gainesville, Florida
January 14, 1981		Vanderbilt	L 81–97	6–5 (1–4)	Memorial Coliseum; Auburn, Alabama
January 17, 1981		Mississippi State	L 61–69	6–6 (1–5)	Humphrey Coliseum; Starkville, Mississippi
January 21, 1981		No. 5 LSU	L 64–74	6–7 (1–6)	Memorial Coliseum; Auburn, Alabama
January 24, 1981		Georgia	L 63–67	6–8 (1–7)	Stegeman Coliseum; Athens, Georgia
January 28, 1981		Alabama	L 73–83	6–9 (1–8)	Memorial Coliseum; Tuscaloosa, Alabama
January 31, 1981		Ole Miss	L 58–61	6–10 (1–9)	Memorial Coliseum; Auburn, Alabama
February 4, 1981		No. 6 Kentucky	L 74–102	6–11 (1–10)	Rupp Arena; Lexington, Kentucky
February 7, 1981		Florida	L 50–55	6–12 (1–11)	Memorial Coliseum; Auburn, Alabama
February 11, 1981		Vanderbilt	W 69–55	7–12 (2–11)	Memorial Gymnasium; Nashville, Tennessee
February 14, 1981		Mississippi State	W 66–55	8–12 (3–11)	Memorial Coliseum; Auburn, Alabama
February 18, 1981		No. 4 LSU	L 47–58	8–13 (3–12)	Maravich Assembly Center; Baton Rouge, Louisiana
February 21, 1981		Georgia	L 65–76	8–14 (3–13)	Memorial Coliseum; Auburn, Alabama
February 25, 1981		Alabama	W 56–54	9–14 (4–13)	Memorial Coliseum; Tuscaloosa, Alabama
February 28, 1981		No. 10 Tennessee	L 63–75	9–15 (4–14)	Stokely Center; Knoxville, Tennessee
SEC Tournament
March 4, 1981	(9)	(8) Florida; First Round	L 48–50	9–16	Birmingham-Jefferson Civic Center; Birmingham, Alabama
*Non-conference game. ^{#}Rankings from AP poll. (#) Tournament seedings in parentheses. SE=Southeast.
