= 1980–81 Tennessee Volunteers basketball team =

American college basketball season

1980–81 Tennessee Volunteers basketball

NCAA tournament, Sweet Sixteen
- Conference: Southeastern Conference
- East

Ranking
- Coaches: No. 15
- AP: No. 15
- Record: 21–8 (12–6 SEC)
- Head coach: Don DeVoe (3rd season)
- Home arena: Stokely Athletic Center

1980–81 Southeastern Conference men's basketball standings
	Conf.				Overall
Team	W		L	PCT	W		L	PCT
No. 4 LSU	17	–	1	.944	31	–	5	.861
No. 8 Kentucky	15	–	3	.833	22	–	6	.786
No. 15 Tennessee	12	–	6	.667	21	–	8	.724
Alabama	10	–	8	.556	18	–	11	.621
Georgia	9	–	9	.500	19	–	12	.613
Ole Miss †	8	–	10	.444	16	–	14	.533
Vanderbilt	7	–	11	.389	15	–	14	.517
Florida	5	–	13	.278	12	–	16	.429
Auburn	4	–	14	.222	11	–	16	.407
Mississippi State	3	–	15	.167	8	–	19	.296
† 1981 SEC tournament winner Rankings from AP Poll

The 1980–81 Tennessee Volunteers basketball team represented the University of Tennessee as a member of the Southeastern Conference during the 1980–81 college basketball season. Led by third-year head coach Don DeVoe, the team played their home games at the Stokely Athletic Center in Knoxville, Tennessee. The Volunteers finished with a record of 21–8 (12–6 SEC, 2nd) and received an at-large bid to the 1981 NCAA tournament as the 4 seed in the East region. After an opening round win over VCU, Tennessee was defeated by No. 1 seed and eventual Final Four participant Virginia, 62–48.

This was the third of five straight seasons of NCAA Tournament basketball for the Tennessee men's program. The Volunteers would not reach the Sweet Sixteen again until the 2000 NCAA tournament.

== Roster ==
1980–81 Tennessee Volunteers men's basketball team
Players
Coaches

Pos.	#	Name	Height	Weight	Year	Hometown
G	10	Tyrone Beaman	5 ft 11 in (1.8 m)	—	Fr	Niagara Falls, New York
F	14	Dale Ellis	6 ft 7 in (2.01 m)	195 lb (88 kg)	So	Marietta, Georgia
G	21	Michael Brooks	6 ft 3 in (1.91 m)	—	Fr	Memphis, Tennessee
G	30	Gary Carter	6 ft 3 in (1.91 m)	—	Jr	Johnson City, Tennessee
C	33	Dan Federmann	6 ft 10 in (2.08 m)	—	Fr	Cincinnati, Ohio
F	40	Willie Burton	6 ft 7 in (2.01 m)	—	Fr	Millen, Georgia
F	44	Howard Wood	6 ft 7 in (2.01 m)	230 lb (104 kg)	Sr	Southampton, New York
F	53	Steve Ray	6 ft 4 in (1.93 m)	—	Jr	Collinsville, Illinois
F/C	54	Randy Bates	6 ft 7 in (2.01 m)	—	Fr	Old Hickory, Tennessee

Head coach

- Don DeVoe (Ohio State)

Assistant coach(es)

Legend

- (C) Team captain
- (S) Suspended
- (I) Ineligible
- (W) Walk-on
- Injured
- Current redshirt

Roster

== Schedule and results ==
Date time, TV	Rank^{#}	Opponent^{#}	Result	Record	Site (attendance) city, state
Regular season
Nov 29, 1980*		Rollins	W 94–58	1–0	Stokely Center; Knoxville, Tennessee
Dec 3, 1980		at Auburn	L 65–75	1–1 (0–1)	Memorial Coliseum; Auburn, Alabama
Dec 6, 1980*		Purdue	W 78–69	2–1	Stokely Center; Knoxville, Tennessee
Dec 9, 1980*		Lafayette	W 72–42	3–1	Stokely Center; Knoxville, Tennessee
Dec 13, 1980*		Colorado	W 87–69	4–1	Stokely Center; Knoxville, Tennessee
Dec 19, 1980*		Iona	W 80–54	5–1	Stokely Center; Knoxville, Tennessee
Dec 20, 1980*		No. 18 Brigham Young	W 81–65	6–1	Stokely Center; Knoxville, Tennessee
Dec 28, 1980*		vs. No. 11 Arizona State; Sugar Bowl Tournament	W 69–53	7–1	Louisiana Superdome; New Orleans, Louisiana
Dec 29, 1980*		vs. Duke; Sugar Bowl Tournament	W 90–69	8–1	Louisiana Superdome; New Orleans, Louisiana
Jan 3, 1981	No. 18	at Alabama	W 70–69	9–1 (1–1)	Memorial Coliseum; Tuscaloosa, Alabama
Jan 7, 1981	No. 13	Ole Miss	W 73–68	10–1 (2–1)	Stokely Center; Knoxville, Tennessee
Jan 10, 1981	No. 13	at No. 4 Kentucky	L 47–48	10–2 (2–2)	Rupp Arena; Lexington, Kentucky
Jan 14, 1981	No. 13	Florida	W 78–64	11–2 (3–2)	Stokely Center; Knoxville, Tennessee
Jan 17, 1981	No. 11	at Vanderbilt	W 72–66	12–2 (4–2)	Memorial Gymnasium; Nashville, Tennessee
Jan 21, 1981	No. 11	Mississippi State	W 81–57	13–2 (5–2)	Stokely Center; Knoxville, Tennessee
Jan 24, 1981	No. 8	at No. 5 LSU	L 63–80	13–3 (5–3)	Maravich Assembly Center; Baton Rouge, Louisiana
Jan 28, 1981	No. 8	Georgia	W 72–67	14–3 (6–3)	Stokely Center; Knoxville, Tennessee
Jan 31, 1981	No. 11	Alabama	W 62–58	15–3 (7–3)	Stokely Center; Knoxville, Tennessee
Feb 4, 1981	No. 11	at Ole Miss	L 52–71	15–4 (7–4)	Tad Smith Coliseum; Oxford, Mississippi
Feb 7, 1981	No. 10	No. 6 Kentucky	W 87–71	16–4 (8–4)	Stokely Center; Knoxville, Tennessee
Feb 11, 1981	No. 10	at Florida	W 53–52	17–4 (9–4)	Stephen C. O'Connell Center; Gainesville, Florida
Feb 14, 1981	No. 9	Vanderbilt	W 79–72	18–4 (10–4)	Stokely Center; Knoxville, Tennessee
Feb 18, 1981	No. 9	at Mississippi State	W 73–70	19–4 (11–4)	Humphrey Coliseum; Starkville, Mississippi
Feb 21, 1981	No. 8	No. 4 LSU	L 65–66	19–5 (11–5)	Stokely Center; Knoxville, Tennessee
Feb 25, 1981	No. 8	at Georgia	L 75–76	19–6 (11–6)	Stegeman Coliseum; Athens, Georgia
Feb 28, 1981	No. 10	Auburn	W 75–63	20–6 (12–6)	Stokely Center; Knoxville, Tennessee
SEC tournament
Mar 5, 1981*; TVS	No. 10	vs. Ole Miss; Quarterfinals	L 71–81	20–7	BJCC Coliseum; Birmingham, Alabama
NCAA tournament
Mar 15, 1981*	(4 E) No. 15	vs. (5 E) VCU; Second round	W 58–56 ^{OT}	21–7	Charlotte Coliseum; Charlotte, North Carolina
Mar 19, 1981*	(4 E) No. 15	vs. (1 E) No. 5 Virginia; East Regional Semifinal – Sweet Sixteen	L 48–62	21–8	The Omni; Atlanta, Georgia
*Non-conference game. ^{#}Rankings from AP poll. (#) Tournament seedings in parentheses. E=East. All times are in Eastern Time.

== NBA draft ==
Round	Pick	Player	NBA club
2	27	Howard Wood	Utah Jazz
