= 1980–81 LSU Tigers basketball team =

American college basketball season

1980–81 LSU Tigers basketball

SEC regular season champions

NCAA tournament, Final Four
- Conference: Southeastern Conference

Ranking
- Coaches: No. 4
- AP: No. 4
- Record: 31–5 (17–1 SEC)
- Head coach: Dale Brown (9th season)
- Assistant coaches: Ron Abernathy (5th season); Rick Huckabay (2nd season)
- Home arena: LSU Assembly Center

1980–81 Southeastern Conference men's basketball standings
	Conf.				Overall
Team	W		L	PCT	W		L	PCT
No. 4 LSU	17	–	1	.944	31	–	5	.861
No. 8 Kentucky	15	–	3	.833	22	–	6	.786
No. 15 Tennessee	12	–	6	.667	21	–	8	.724
Alabama	10	–	8	.556	18	–	11	.621
Georgia	9	–	9	.500	19	–	12	.613
Ole Miss †	8	–	10	.444	16	–	14	.533
Vanderbilt	7	–	11	.389	15	–	14	.517
Florida	5	–	13	.278	12	–	16	.429
Auburn	4	–	14	.222	11	–	16	.407
Mississippi State	3	–	15	.167	8	–	19	.296
† 1981 SEC tournament winner Rankings from AP Poll

The 1980–81 LSU Tigers basketball team represented Louisiana State University as a member of the Southeastern Conference during the 1980–81 NCAA men's basketball season. Led by ninth-year head coach Dale Brown, the Fighting Tigers played their home games in the LSU Assembly Center, which would be renamed in memory of Tiger legend Pete Maravich, the NCAA Division I men's basketball career scoring leader, shortly after his death in 1988.

After a loss to Arkansas in the Great Alaska Shootout, the Tigers won 26 consecutive games, 17 in the SEC, before a loss at Kentucky in the regular season finale. The setback in Lexington prevented LSU from becoming the first team to go 18–0 in conference play since the SEC adopted its double round-robin format in 1966-67.

As No. 1 seed in the Midwest region for the second consecutive year, the Tigers avenged the early season loss to Arkansas in the Sweet Sixteen and defeated Wichita State to reach the Final Four for the first time since 1953.

Losses in the Final Four at Philadelphia vs. Indiana and Virginia, the latter in the last third-place game ever contested in an NCAA tournament, took some of the luster off the Tigers' spectacular season, leaving them with a final mark of 31–5.

The Hoosiers defeated North Carolina 63–50 in the championship game, marking the third consecutive year LSU lost in the NCAA Tournament to the eventual national champion (Michigan State in 1979, Louisville in 1980). This coincidence recurred in 1986 (Louisville) and 1987 (Indiana).

Following this season, LSU ended its yearly series vs. in-state rival Tulane. The Tigers and Green Wave faced off 201 times between January 1911 and December 1980, but have met only seven times since.

== Roster ==
1980–81 LSU Tigers men's basketball team
Players
Coaches

Pos.	#	Name	Height	Weight	Year	Hometown
G	22	Brian Bergeron	6 ft 3 in (1.91 m)	175 lb (79 kg)	Jr	Port Allen, Louisiana
C	34	Tyrone Black	6 ft 8 in (2.03 m)	200 lb (91 kg)	So	Baton Rouge, Louisiana
C	44	Andy Campbell	7 ft 2 in (2.18 m)	235 lb (107 kg)	Sr	Hackham West, South Australia
G/F	32	Howard Carter	6 ft 5 in (1.96 m)	235 lb (107 kg)	So	Baton Rouge, Louisiana
C	43	Greg Cook	6 ft 9 in (2.06 m)	230 lb (104 kg)	Sr	Roselle, New Jersey
G/F	25	Joe Costello	6 ft 7 in (2.01 m)	200 lb (91 kg)	So	Arlington, Texas
G/F	14	Matt England	6 ft 5 in (1.96 m)	180 lb (82 kg)	Fr	Houston, Texas
G	12	Johnny Jones	6 ft 2 in (1.88 m)	170 lb (77 kg)	Fr	DeRidder, Louisiana
F	30	Brian Kistler	6 ft 6 in (1.98 m)	190 lb (86 kg)	Fr	Indianapolis, Indiana
F	40	Durand Macklin	6 ft 7 in (2.01 m)	205 lb (93 kg)	Sr	Louisville, Kentucky
G	21	Ethan Martin	6 ft 0 in (1.83 m)	170 lb (77 kg)	Sr	Baton Rouge, Louisiana
F	24	Leonard Mitchell	6 ft 7 in (2.01 m)	190 lb (86 kg)	Fr	St. Martinville, Louisiana
G	10	Willie Sims	6 ft 3 in (1.91 m)	200 lb (91 kg)	Sr	Long Island City, New York
G	20	John Tudor	6 ft 5 in (1.96 m)	180 lb (82 kg)	Fr	Pineville, Louisiana

Head coach

- Dale Brown

Assistant coach(es)

- Ron Abernathy
- Rick Huckabay

Legend

- (C) Team captain
- (S) Suspended
- (I) Ineligible
- (W) Walk-on
- Injured
- Current redshirt

Roster
Last update: 2016-Mar-12

== Schedule and results ==
Date time, TV	Rank^{#}	Opponent^{#}	Result	Record	Site city, state
Regular season
Nov 28, 1980*	No. 12	vs. Colgate; Great Alaska Shootout	W 79–61	1–0	Buckner Fieldhouse; Fort Richardson, Alaska
Nov 29, 1980*	No. 12	vs. No. 20 Arkansas; Great Alaska Shootout	L 76–86	1–1	Buckner Fieldhouse; Fort Richardson, Alaska
Nov 30, 1980*	No. 12	vs. No. 16 Georgetown; Great Alaska Shootout	W 76–67	2–1	Buckner Fieldhouse (2,000); Fort Richardson, Alaska
Dec 6, 1980*	No. 15	Tulane	W 119–81	3–1	LSU Assembly Center; Baton Rouge, Louisiana
Dec 13, 1980*	No. 11	Nevada-Las Vegas	W 87–73	4–1	LSU Assembly Center; Baton Rouge, Louisiana
Dec 18, 1980*	No. 10	at New Orleans	W 96–66	5–1	Louisiana Superdome; New Orleans, Louisiana
Dec 20, 1980*	No. 10	at Tulane	W 86–72	6–1	Louisiana Superdome; New Orleans, Louisiana
Dec 22, 1980*	No. 10	Xavier	W 78–62	7–1	LSU Assembly Center; Baton Rouge, Louisiana
Dec 29, 1980*	No. 10	North Carolina-Wilmington	W 100–68	8–1	LSU Assembly Center; Baton Rouge, Louisiana
Dec 30, 1980*	No. 10	Saint Francis (PA)	W 91–65	9–1	LSU Assembly Center; Baton Rouge, Louisiana
Jan 3, 1981	No. 10	at Florida	W 92–66	10–1 (1–0)	Stephen C. O'Connell Center; Gainesville, Florida
Jan 7, 1981	No. 9	Vanderbilt	W 77–61	11–1 (2–0)	LSU Assembly Center; Baton Rouge, Louisiana
Jan 10, 1981	No. 9	at Mississippi State	W 81–69	12–1 (3–0)	Humphrey Coliseum; Starkville, Mississippi
Jan 14, 1981	No. 6	at Alabama	W 59–56	13–1 (4–0)	Coleman Coliseum; Tuscaloosa, Alabama
Jan 17, 1981	No. 6	Georgia	W 78–65	14–1 (5–0)	LSU Assembly Center; Baton Rouge, Louisiana
Jan 19, 1981	No. 5	No. 6 Kentucky	W 81–67	15–1 (6–0)	LSU Assembly Center; Baton Rouge, Louisiana
Jan 21, 1981	No. 5	at Auburn	W 74–64	16–1 (7–0)	Beard-Eaves-Memorial Coliseum; Auburn, Alabama
Jan 24, 1981	No. 5	No. 8 Tennessee	W 80–63	17–1 (8–0)	LSU Assembly Center; Baton Rouge, Louisiana
Jan 28, 1981	No. 4	at Ole Miss	W 63–59	18–1 (9–0)	Tad Smith Coliseum; Oxford, Mississippi
Jan 31, 1981	No. 4	Florida	W 92–75	19–1 (10–0)	LSU Assembly Center; Baton Rouge, Louisiana
Feb 4, 1981	No. 4	at Vanderbilt	W 86–81	20–1 (11–0)	Memorial Gymnasium; Nashville, Tennessee
Feb 7, 1981	No. 4	Mississippi State	W 94–89	21–1 (12–0)	LSU Assembly Center; Baton Rouge, Louisiana
Feb 11, 1981	No. 4	Alabama	W 70–57	22–1 (13–0)	LSU Assembly Center; Baton Rouge, Louisiana
Feb 14, 1981	No. 4	at Georgia	W 64–62	23–1 (14–0)	Georgia Coliseum; Athens, Georgia
Feb 18, 1981	No. 4	Auburn	W 58–47	24–1 (15–0)	LSU Assembly Center; Baton Rouge, Louisiana
Feb 21, 1981	No. 4	at No. 8 Tennessee	W 66–65	25–1 (16–0)	Stokely Athletic Center; Knoxville, Tennessee
Feb 22, 1981*	No. 4	Texas A&M	W 67–57	26–1	LSU Assembly Center; Baton Rouge, Louisiana
Feb 25, 1981	No. 2	Ole Miss	W 74–67	27–1 (17–0)	LSU Assembly Center; Baton Rouge, Louisiana
Mar 1, 1981; NBC	No. 2	at No. 9 Kentucky	L 71–73	27–2 (17–1)	Rupp Arena; Lexington, Kentucky
SEC Tournament
Mar 5, 1981*	(1) No. 3	vs. (8) Florida; Quarterfinals	W 85–73	28–2	Birmingham-Jefferson Civic Center; Birmingham, Alabama
Mar 6, 1981*	(1) No. 3	vs. (5) Georgia; Semifinals	L 60–68	28–3	Birmingham-Jefferson Civic Center; Birmingham, Alabama
NCAA Tournament
Mar 14, 1981*	(1 MW) No. 4	vs. (8 MW) Lamar; Second round	W 100–78	29–3	Frank Erwin Center; Austin, Texas
Mar 20, 1981*; 9:05 p.m.	(1 MW) No. 4	vs. (5 MW) No. 20 Arkansas; Midwest Regional semifinal – Sweet Sixteen	W 72–56	30–3	Louisiana Superdome; New Orleans, Louisiana
Mar 22, 1981*; 2:05 p.m.	(1 MW) No. 4	vs. (6 MW) Wichita State; Midwest Regional Final – Elite Eight	W 96–85	31–3	Louisiana Superdome; New Orleans, Louisiana
Mar 28, 1981*; 12:45 p.m.	(1 MW) No. 4	vs. (3 ME) No. 9 Indiana; National semifinal – Final Four	L 49–67	31–4	The Spectrum; Philadelphia, Pennsylvania
Mar 30, 1981*; 5 p.m.	(1 MW) No. 4	vs. (1 E) No. 5 Virginia; Third-place game	L 74–78	31–5	The Spectrum (18,276); Philadelphia, Pennsylvania
*Non-conference game. ^{#}Rankings from AP Poll. (#) Tournament seedings in parentheses. MW=Midwest. All times are in Central Time.

== Rankings ==
Ranking movements Legend: ██ Increase in ranking ██ Decrease in ranking
	Week															
Poll	Pre	1	2	3	4	5	6	7	8	9	10	11	12	13	14	Final
AP	12	15	11	10	10	10	9	6	5	4	4	4	4	2	3	4
Coaches	13	13^	11	12	12	11	10	6	5	4	4	4	4	4	3	4

^Coaches did not release a week-1 poll.
