= 1980–81 Vanderbilt Commodores men's basketball team =

American college basketball season

1980–81 Vanderbilt Commodores men's basketball
- Conference: Southeastern Conference
- Record: 15–14 (7–11 SEC)
- Head coach: Richard Schmidt
- Home arena: Memorial Gymnasium

1980–81 Southeastern Conference men's basketball standings
	Conf.				Overall
Team	W		L	PCT	W		L	PCT
No. 4 LSU	17	–	1	.944	31	–	5	.861
No. 8 Kentucky	15	–	3	.833	22	–	6	.786
No. 15 Tennessee	12	–	6	.667	21	–	8	.724
Alabama	10	–	8	.556	18	–	11	.621
Georgia	9	–	9	.500	19	–	12	.613
Ole Miss †	8	–	10	.444	16	–	14	.533
Vanderbilt	7	–	11	.389	15	–	14	.517
Florida	5	–	13	.278	12	–	16	.429
Auburn	4	–	14	.222	11	–	16	.407
Mississippi State	3	–	15	.167	8	–	19	.296
† 1981 SEC tournament winner Rankings from AP Poll

The 1980–81 Vanderbilt Commodores men's basketball team represented Vanderbilt University as a member of the Southeastern Conference during the 1980–81 college basketball season. The Commodores finished season with record of 15-14, 7-11.

== Roster ==
The roster for the 80-81 team are as follows:

1. Al Miller

2. Charles Davis

3. Mike Rhodes

4. Hutch Jones

5. Ted Young

6. Jimmy Gray

7. Al McKinney

8. Brian Allsmiller

9. Jeff Turner

10. Jimmy Lenz

11. Kevin Linder

12. John Derenbecker

13. James Williams

14. Doug Weikert

== Schedule ==
The 1980-81 schedule is as follows:

Date time, TV	Rank^{#}	Opponent^{#}	Result	Record	Site city, state
November 27*		vs. Western Kentucky	W 78–76	1–0	E.A. Diddle Arena; Bowling Green, Kentucky
November 28*		vs. Iona	W 92–59	2–0	E.A. Diddle Arena; Bowling Green, Kentucky
December 1*		Iowa State	W 97–87	3–0	Memorial Gymnasium; Nashville, Tennessee
December 9*		Duke	L 69–72 ^{OT}	3–1	Memorial Gymnasium; Nashville, Tennessee
December 20*		North Alabama	W 111–79	4–1	Memorial Gymnasium; Nashville, Tennessee
December 23*		Memphis	W 111–96	5–1	Memorial Gymnasium; Nashville, Tennessee
December 27		Alabama	W 93–91	6–1 (1–0)	Memorial Gymnasium; Nashville, Tennessee
December 29*		Tennessee Tech	W 97–64	7–1 (1–0)	Memorial Gymnasium; Nashville, Tennessee
December 30*		Boston College	L 72–87	7–2 (1–0)	Memorial Gymnasium; Nashville, Tennessee
January 3		Mississippi State	W 79–61	8–2 (2–0)	Memorial Gymnasium; Nashville, Tennessee
January 7		at LSU	L 61–77	8–3 (2–1)	Maravich Assembly Center; Baton Rouge, Louisiana
January 10		Georgia	W 70–55	9–3 (3–1)	Memorial Gymnasium; Nashville, Tennessee
January 14		at Auburn	W 97–81	10–3 (4–1)	Beard-Eaves-Memorial Coliseum; Auburn, Alabama
January 17		No. 11 Tennessee	L 66–72	10–4 (4–2)	Memorial Gymnasium; Nashville, Tennessee
January 21		at Ole Miss	L 44–46	10–5 (4–3)	Tad Smith Coliseum; Oxford, MS
January 24		Kentucky	L 64–78	10–6 (4–4)	Memorial Gymnasium; Nashville, Tennessee
January 28		at Florida	W 72–70	11–6 (5–4)	Stephen C. O'Connell Center
January 31		at Mississippi State	L 68–69	11–7 (5–5)	Humphrey Coliseum
February 4		No. 4 LSU	L 81–86	11–8 (5–6)	Memorial Gymnasium; Nashville, Tennessee
February 7		at Georgia	L 72–80	11–9 (5–7)	Stegeman Coliseum; Athens, GA
February 11		Auburn	L 55–69	11–10 (5–8)	Memorial Gymnasium; Nashville, Tennessee
February 14		at No. 9 Tennessee	L 72–76	12–10 (6–8)	Stokely Athletic Center; Knoxville, Tennessee
February 18		Ole Miss	W 52–50	13–10 (7–8)	Memorial Gymnasium; Nashville, Tennessee
February 21		at No. 10 Kentucky	L 48–80	13–11 (7–9)	Rupp Arena; Lexington, Kentucky
February 25		Florida	W 73–64	14–11 (8–9)	Memorial Gymnasium; Nashville, Tennessee
February 28		at Alabama	L 68–82	14–12 (8–10)	Coleman Coliseum; Tuscaloosa, Alabama
SEC Tournament
March 4		vs. Mississippi State	W 71–58	15–12 (8–10)	Birmingham-Jefferson Civic Center; Birmingham, Alabama
March 5		vs. No. 7 Kentucky	W 60–55	16–12 (8–10)	Birmingham-Jefferson Civic Center; Birmingham, Alabama
March 6		vs. Ole Miss	L 51–71	16–13 (8–10)	Birmingham-Jefferson Civic Center; Birmingham, Alabama
*Non-conference game. ^{#}Rankings from AP Poll. (#) Tournament seedings in parentheses.
