= 1980–81 Alabama Crimson Tide men's basketball team =

American college basketball season

1980–81 Alabama Crimson Tide men's basketball

NIT, Second Round
- Conference: Southeastern Conference
- Record: 18–11 (10–8 SEC)
- Head coach: Wimp Sanderson (1st season)
- Home arena: Coleman Coliseum

1980–81 Southeastern Conference men's basketball standings
	Conf.				Overall
Team	W		L	PCT	W		L	PCT
No. 4 LSU	17	–	1	.944	31	–	5	.861
No. 8 Kentucky	15	–	3	.833	22	–	6	.786
No. 15 Tennessee	12	–	6	.667	21	–	8	.724
Alabama	10	–	8	.556	18	–	11	.621
Georgia	9	–	9	.500	19	–	12	.613
Ole Miss †	8	–	10	.444	16	–	14	.533
Vanderbilt	7	–	11	.389	15	–	14	.517
Florida	5	–	13	.278	12	–	16	.429
Auburn	4	–	14	.222	11	–	16	.407
Mississippi State	3	–	15	.167	8	–	19	.296
† 1981 SEC tournament winner Rankings from AP Poll

The 1980–81 Alabama Crimson Tide men's basketball team represented the University of Alabama in the 1980–81 NCAA Division I men's basketball season. The team's head coach was Wimp Sanderson, who was in his first season at Alabama. The team played their home games at Coleman Coliseum in Tuscaloosa, Alabama. They finished the season 18–11, 10–8 in SEC play, finishing in fourth place.

The Tide were eliminated in the first round of the SEC tournament by the Georgia Bulldogs. Afterwards, the Tide accepted a bid to the 1981 National Invitation Tournament and reached the second round where they lost to Duke University.

== Roster ==
1980–81 Alabama Crimson Tide men's basketball team
Players
Coaches

Pos.	#	Name	Height	Weight	Year	Previous school	Hometown
F	51	Eddie Phillips	6 ft 7 in (2.01 m)	—	Jr	A. H. Parker High School	Birmingham, Alabama
F	32	Ken Johnson	6 ft 7 in (2.01 m)	—	Sr	Central High School	Phenix City, AL
G	20	Eddie Adams	6 ft 0 in (1.83 m)	—	Jr	Central High School	Phenix City, Alabama
C	41	Phillip Lockett	6 ft 9 in (2.06 m)	—	Jr	Livingston High School	Livingston, Alabama
G	44	Mike Davis	6 ft 4 in (1.93 m)	—	So	Fayette High School	Fayette, Alabama
F	33	Cliff Windham	6 ft 5 in (1.96 m)	—	So	Livingston High School	Emelle, Alabama
G	4	Eric Richardson	6 ft 3 in (1.91 m)	—	Fr	Carver High School	Birmingham, Alabama
F		Eugene Jones	6 ft 6 in (1.98 m)	—	So
G		Vance Wheeler	6 ft 4 in (1.93 m)	—	So
F	40	Maurice Myers	6 ft 7 in (2.01 m)	—	Jr	Holy Family High School	Birmingham, Alabama
F		Terry Williams	6 ft 8 in (2.03 m)	—		Elkmont High School	Elkmont, Alabama
F		Sam Randolph	—	—
F		Desi Barmore	6 ft 7 in (2.01 m)	—

Head coach

- Wimp Sanderson

Assistant coach(es)

Legend

- (C) Team captain
- (S) Suspended
- (I) Ineligible
- (W) Walk-on
- Injured
- Current redshirt

== Schedule and results ==
Date time, TV	Rank^{#}	Opponent^{#}	Result	Record	Site city, state
Regular Season
November 28, 1980*		Northern Iowa	W 93–66	1–0	Memorial Coliseum; Tuscaloosa, Alabama
December 1, 1980*		Wisconsin	W 90–75	2–0	Memorial Coliseum; Tuscaloosa, Alabama
December 6, 1980*		La Salle	W 81–65	3–0	Palestra; Philadelphia, Pennsylvania
December 13, 1980		Texas Tech	W 66–64	4–0	Memorial Coliseum; Tuscaloosa, Alabama
December 15, 1980*		Western Carolina	W 67–57	5–0	Memorial Coliseum; Tuscaloosa, Alabama
December 19, 1980*		Old Dominion	W 71–63	6–0	Toso Pavilion; Santa Clara, California
December 20, 1980*		No. 12 Wake Forest	L 66–79	6–1	Toso Pavilion; Santa Clara, California
December 27, 1980		Vanderbilt	L 91–93	6–2 (0–1)	Memorial Gymnasium; Nashville, Tennessee
January 3, 1981		No. 18 Tennessee	L 69–70	6–3 (0–2)	Memorial Coliseum; Tuscaloosa, Alabama
January 7, 1981		Mississippi State	W 80–69	7–3 (1–2)	Humphrey Coliseum; Starkville, Mississippi
January 10, 1981		Ole Miss	W 74–48	8–3 (2–2)	Tad Smith Coliseum; Oxford, Mississippi
January 14, 1981		No. 6 LSU	L 56–59	8–4 (2–3)	Memorial Coliseum; Tuscaloosa, Alabama
January 17, 1981		No. 3 Kentucky	W 59–55	9–4 (3–3)	Memorial Coliseum; Tuscaloosa, Alabama
January 21, 1981		Georgia	W 83–71	10–4 (4–3)	Stegeman Coliseum; Athens, Georgia
January 24, 1981		Florida	L 91–97	10–5 (4–4)	O'Connell Center; Gainesville, Florida
January 28, 1981		Auburn	W 83–73	11–5 (5–4)	Memorial Coliseum; Tuscaloosa, Alabama
January 31, 1981		No. 11 Tennessee	L 58–62	11–6 (5–5)	Stokely Center; Knoxville, Tennessee
February 4, 1981		Mississippi State	W 91–79	12–6 (6–5)	Memorial Coliseum; Tuscaloosa, Alabama
February 7, 1981		Ole Miss	W 51–49	13–6 (7–5)	Memorial Coliseum; Tuscaloosa, Alabama
February 11, 1981		No. 4 LSU	L 57–70	13–7 (7–6)	Maravich Assembly Center; Baton Rouge, Louisiana
February 14, 1981		No. 11 Kentucky	L 62–77	13–8 (7–7)	Rupp Arena; Lexington, Kentucky
February 18, 1981		Georgia	W 91–74	14–8 (8–7)	Memorial Coliseum; Tuscaloosa, Alabama
February 21, 1981		Florida	W 57–44	15–8 (9–7)	Memorial Coliseum; Tuscaloosa, Alabama
February 25, 1981		Auburn	L 54–56	15–9 (9–8)	Memorial Coliseum; Tuscaloosa, Alabama
February 28, 1981		Vanderbilt	W 82–68	16–9 (10–8)	Memorial Coliseum; Tuscaloosa, Alabama
SEC Tournament
March 5, 1981	(4)	(5) Georgia; Second Round	L 80–88	16–10	Birmingham-Jefferson Civic Center; Birmingham, Alabama
NIT
March 12, 1981*		St. John's; First round	W 73–69	17–10	Alumni Hall; Queens, New York
March 16, 1981*		Duke; Second round	L 70–75	17–11	Cameron Indoor Stadium; Durham, North Carolina
*Non-conference game. ^{#}Rankings from AP poll. (#) Tournament seedings in parentheses. SE=Southeast.
