= 1980–81 UAB Blazers men's basketball team =

American college basketball season

1980–81 UAB Blazers men's basketball

NCAA tournament, Sweet Sixteen
- Conference: Sun Belt Conference
- Record: 23–9 (9–3 Sun Belt)
- Head coach: Gene Bartow (3rd season)
- Home arena: BJCC Coliseum

1980–81 Sun Belt Conference men's basketball standings
	Conf.				Overall
Team	W		L	PCT	W		L	PCT
VCU †	9	–	3	.750	24	–	5	.828
South Alabama	9	–	3	.750	25	–	6	.806
UAB	9	–	3	.750	23	–	9	.719
South Florida	7	–	5	.583	18	–	11	.621
Jacksonville	4	–	8	.333	8	–	19	.296
UNC Charlotte	3	–	9	.250	10	–	17	.370
Georgia State	1	–	11	.083	4	–	23	.148
† 1981 Sun Belt Conference tournament winner Rankings from AP Poll

The 1980–81 UAB Blazers men's basketball team represented the University of Alabama at Birmingham as a member of the Sun Belt Conference during the 1980–81 NCAA Division I men's basketball season. This was head coach Gene Bartow's third season at UAB, and the Blazers played their home games at BJCC Coliseum. They finished the season 23–9, 9–3 in Sun Belt play and fell in the championship game of the Sun Belt tournament. They received an automatic bid to the NCAA tournament as No. 7 seed in the Mideast region. After beating No. 10 seed Western Kentucky in the opening round, UAB upset No. 2 seed Kentucky to reach the Sweet Sixteen. The Blazers fell to No. 3 seed and eventual National champion Indiana in the Mideast regional semifinal, 87–72.

This season marked Coach Bartow's first trip (of nine total) to the NCAA tournament as coach of the Blazers, and started a string of seven consecutive bids to the "Big Dance."

== Roster ==
1980–81 UAB Blazers men's basketball team
Players
Coaches

Pos.	#	Name	Height	Weight	Year	Hometown
G	14	Jonathan Nicholas	6 ft 3 in (1.91 m)	—	Jr	Brooklyn, New York
G	15	Luellen Foster	6 ft 4 in (1.93 m)	165 lb (75 kg)	Fr	Birmingham, Alabama
G	20	Oliver Robinson	6 ft 4 in (1.93 m)	180 lb (82 kg)	So	Birmingham, Alabama
G	21	Scott Simcik	6 ft 1 in (1.85 m)	—	So	Simi Valley, California
G	24	Raymond Gause	6 ft 5 in (1.96 m)	195 lb (88 kg)	Jr	Memphis, Tennessee
G	34	Glenn Marcus	5 ft 10 in (1.78 m)	155 lb (70 kg)	Sr	Alabaster, Alabama
F	32	Tim Almquist	6 ft 7 in (2.01 m)	200 lb (91 kg)	Sr	Forest Lake, Minnesota
F	40	Chris Giles	6 ft 8 in (2.03 m)	200 lb (91 kg)	Jr	Birmingham, Alabama
C	42	Lex Drum	6 ft 10 in (2.08 m)	—	So	Poplar Bluff, Missouri
F	44	Craig Lane	6 ft 6 in (1.98 m)	210 lb (95 kg)	Jr	Quincy, Florida
C	52	Donnie Speer	6 ft 8 in (2.03 m)	225 lb (102 kg)	Jr	Sylacauga, Alabama
C	55	Norman Anchrum	6 ft 10 in (2.08 m)	225 lb (102 kg)	Jr	Birmingham, Alabama

Head coach

- Gene Bartow

Assistant coach(es)

Legend

- (C) Team captain
- (S) Suspended
- (I) Ineligible
- (W) Walk-on
- Injured
- Current redshirt

Roster

== Schedule and results ==
Date time, TV	Rank^{#}	Opponent^{#}	Result	Record	Site (attendance) city, state
Regular season
Nov 29, 1980*		MacMurray	W 96–56	1–0	Birmingham-Jefferson Civic Center (4,628); Birmingham, Alabama
Dec 3, 1980*		Butler	W 87–58	2–0	Birmingham-Jefferson Civic Center (4,568); Birmingham, Alabama
Dec 6, 1980*		at Ole Miss	L 72–83	2–1	Tad Smith Coliseum (3,928); Oxford, Mississippi
Dec 8, 1980*		UT Arlington	W 67–54	3–1	Birmingham-Jefferson Civic Center (4,295); Birmingham, Alabama
Dec 11, 1980*		Roosevelt	W 112–55	4–1	Birmingham-Jefferson Civic Center (3,649); Birmingham, Alabama
Dec 13, 1980*		at Pittsburgh	W 70–58	5–1	Fitzgerald Field House (3,885); Pittsburgh, Pennsylvania
Dec 16, 1980*		Missouri Western	W 107–54	6–1	Birmingham-Jefferson Civic Center (4,298); Birmingham, Alabama
Dec 19, 1980*		vs. Idaho State; UKIT	W 68–55	7–1	Rupp Arena (12,400); Lexington, Kentucky
Dec 20, 1980*		at No. 2 Kentucky; UKIT	L 53–61	7–2	Rupp Arena (23,835); Lexington, Kentucky
Dec 23, 1980*		at Iowa State	L 70–71	7–3	Hilton Coliseum (6,129); Ames, Iowa
Dec 29, 1980*		Rice; UAB Classic	W 78–60	8–3	Birmingham-Jefferson Civic Center (6,282); Birmingham, Alabama
Dec 30, 1980*		Southern Miss; UAB Classic	W 60–55 ^{OT}	9–3	Birmingham-Jefferson Civic Center (8,078); Birmingham, Alabama
Jan 3, 1981		Jacksonville	W 73–55	10–3 (1–0)	Birmingham-Jefferson Civic Center (7,195); Birmingham, Alabama
Jan 10, 1981		VCU	W 67–65	11–3 (2–0)	Birmingham-Jefferson Civic Center (8,881); Birmingham, Alabama
Jan 17, 1981		at South Florida	L 77–79	11–4 (2–1)	USF Sun Dome (7,107); Tampa, Florida
Jan 24, 1981		at Jacksonville	W 76–64	12–4 (3–1)	Jacksonville Coliseum (3,805); Jacksonville, Florida
Jan 29, 1981		South Florida	W 70–53	13–4 (4–1)	Birmingham-Jefferson Civic Center (8,059); Birmingham, Alabama
Jan 31, 1981		South Alabama	W 73–70	14–4 (5–1)	Birmingham-Jefferson Civic Center (16,131); Birmingham, Alabama
Feb 2, 1981		at Georgia State	W 85–67	15–4 (6–1)	GSU Sports Arena (325); Atlanta, Georgia
Feb 5, 1981		Georgia State	W 89–64	16–4 (7–1)	Birmingham-Jefferson Civic Center (5,813); Birmingham, Alabama
Feb 7, 1981*		at No. 3 DePaul	L 66–77	16–5	Allstate Arena (16,232); Rosemont, Illinois
Feb 12, 1981		at Charlotte	W 73–57	17–5 (8–1)	Belk Gymnasium (1,504); Charlotte, North Carolina
Feb 15, 1981		at VCU	L 69–79	17–6 (8–2)	Richmond Coliseum (8,100); Richmond, Virginia
Feb 18, 1981		at South Alabama	L 57–77	17–7 (8–3)	Jaguar Gym (10,549); Mobile, Alabama
Feb 22, 1981		Charlotte	W 80–64	18–7 (9–3)	Birmingham-Jefferson Civic Center (7,129); Birmingham, Alabama
Feb 24, 1981*		Samford	W 92–67	19–7	Birmingham-Jefferson Civic Center (5,310); Birmingham, Alabama
Sun Belt tournament
Feb 27, 1981*	(3)	vs. (6) Charlotte; Quarterfinals	W 80–64	20–7	Jacksonville Memorial Coliseum (6,122); Jacksonville, Florida
Feb 28, 1981*	(3)	vs. (2) South Alabama; Semifinals	W 86–59	21–7	Jacksonville Memorial Coliseum (5,271); Jacksonville, Florida
Mar 1, 1981*	(3)	vs. (1) VCU; Championship game	L 61–62 ^{OT}	21–8	Jacksonville Memorial Coliseum (3,873); Jacksonville, Florida
NCAA tournament
Mar 13, 1981*	(7 ME)	vs. (10 ME) Western Kentucky; First round	W 93–68	22–8	Memorial Coliseum (10,628); Tuscaloosa, Alabama
Mar 15, 1981*	(7 ME)	vs. (2 ME) No. 8 Kentucky; Second round	W 69–62	23–8	Memorial Coliseum (12,229); Tuscaloosa, Alabama
Mar 20, 1981*	(7 ME)	vs. (3 ME) No. 9 Indiana; Mideast Regional Semifinal – Sweet Sixteen	L 72–87	23–9	Assembly Hall (17,091); Bloomington, Indiana
*Non-conference game. ^{#}Rankings from AP poll. (#) Tournament seedings in parentheses. ME=Mideast.

== Awards and honors ==
- Gene Bartow – Sun Belt Conference Coach of the Year
