= 1980–81 Kentucky Wildcats men's basketball team =

1980–81 season of University of Kentucky men's basketball team

1980–81 Kentucky Wildcats men's basketball

NCAA Tournament, Round of 32
- Conference: Southeastern Conference

Ranking
- Coaches: No. 8
- AP: No. 8
- Record: 22–6 (15–3 SEC)
- Head coach: Joe B. Hall (9th season)
- Home arena: Rupp Arena

1980–81 Southeastern Conference men's basketball standings
	Conf.				Overall
Team	W		L	PCT	W		L	PCT
No. 4 LSU	17	–	1	.944	31	–	5	.861
No. 8 Kentucky	15	–	3	.833	22	–	6	.786
No. 15 Tennessee	12	–	6	.667	21	–	8	.724
Alabama	10	–	8	.556	18	–	11	.621
Georgia	9	–	9	.500	19	–	12	.613
Ole Miss †	8	–	10	.444	16	–	14	.533
Vanderbilt	7	–	11	.389	15	–	14	.517
Florida	5	–	13	.278	12	–	16	.429
Auburn	4	–	14	.222	11	–	16	.407
Mississippi State	3	–	15	.167	8	–	19	.296
† 1981 SEC tournament winner Rankings from AP Poll

The 1980–81 Kentucky Wildcats men's basketball team represented University of Kentucky in the 1980–81 NCAA Division I men's basketball season. The head coach was Joe B. Hall and the team finished the season with an overall record of 22–6. In the 1981 NCAA Tournament Kentucky was upset by the University of Alabama at Birmingham 69–62 in the second round.

== Roster ==
1980–81 Kentucky Wildcats men's basketball team
Players
Coaches

Pos.	#	Name	Height	Weight	Year	Hometown
G	10	Dirk Minniefield	6 ft 3 in (1.91 m)	180 lb (82 kg)	So	Lexington, Kentucky
G	11	Dicky Beal	5 ft 11 in (1.8 m)	170 lb (77 kg)	Fr	Covington, Kentucky
G	12	Bo Lanter	6 ft 1 in (1.85 m)	175 lb (79 kg)	Jr	Versailles, Kentucky
G	15	Chris Gettelfinger	6 ft 2 in (1.88 m)	185 lb (84 kg)	Sr	Knoxville, Tennessee
G	20	Jim Master	6 ft 5 in (1.96 m)	180 lb (82 kg)	Fr	Fort Wayne, Indiana
F	24	Bret Bearup	6 ft 9 in (2.06 m)	230 lb (104 kg)	Fr	Centerport, New York
F/C	31	Sam Bowie	7 ft 1 in (2.16 m)	235 lb (107 kg)	So	Lebanon, Pennsylvania
G/F	32	Derrick Hord	6 ft 6 in (1.98 m)	215 lb (98 kg)	So	Bristol, Tennessee
F	34	Chuck Verderber	6 ft 6 in (1.98 m)	220 lb (100 kg)	Jr	Lincoln, Illinois
F/C	40	Fred Cowan	6 ft 8 in (2.03 m)	205 lb (93 kg)	Sr	Sturgis, Kentucky
F	44	Charles Hurt	6 ft 6 in (1.98 m)	215 lb (98 kg)	So	Shelbyville, Kentucky
C	54	Melvin Turpin	6 ft 11 in (2.11 m)	240 lb (109 kg)	Fr	Lexington, Kentucky

Head coach

- Joe B. Hall (Kentucky)

Assistant coach(es)

Legend

- (C) Team captain
- (S) Suspended
- (I) Ineligible
- (W) Walk-on
- Injured
- Current redshirt

== Schedule and results ==
Date time, TV	Rank^{#}	Opponent^{#}	Result	Record	Site city, state
Regular Season
November 29, 1980*	No. 1	East Tennessee State	W 62–57	1–0	Rupp Arena; Lexington, Kentucky
December 3, 1980*	No. 2	No. 9 Ohio State	W 70–64	2–0	Rupp Arena; Lexington, Kentucky
December 6, 1980*	No. 2	No. 5 Indiana; Rivalry	W 68–66	3–0	Assembly Hall; Bloomington, Indiana
December 13, 1980*	No. 2	Kansas	W 87–73	4–0	Rupp Arena; Lexington, Kentucky
December 19, 1980*	No. 2	Alaska Anchorage	W 91–56	5–0	Rupp Arena; Lexington, Kentucky
December 20, 1980*	No. 2	UAB	W 61–53	6–0	Rupp Arena; Lexington, Kentucky
December 27, 1980*	No. 2	No. 8 Notre Dame	L 61–67	6–1	Freedom Hall; Louisville, Kentucky
December 30, 1980*	No. 5	Maine	W 100–54	7–1	Rupp Arena; Lexington, Kentucky
January 3, 1981	No. 5	Georgia	W 76–62	8–1 (1–0)	Rupp Arena; Lexington, Kentucky
January 7, 1981	No. 4	Auburn	W 79–66	9–1 (2–0)	Memorial Coliseum; Auburn, Alabama
January 10, 1981	No. 4	No. 13 Tennessee	W 48–47	10–1 (3–0)	Rupp Arena; Lexington, Kentucky
January 14, 1981	No. 3	Ole Miss	W 64–55	11–1 (4–0)	Rupp Arena; Lexington, Kentucky
January 17, 1981	No. 3	Alabama	L 55–59	11–2 (4–1)	Memorial Coliseum; Tuscaloosa, Alabama
January 19, 1981	No. 6	No. 5 LSU	L 67–81	11–3 (4–2)	Maravich Assembly Center; Baton Rouge, Louisiana
January 21, 1981	No. 6	Florida	W 102–48	12–3 (5–2)	Rupp Arena; Lexington, Kentucky
January 24, 1981	No. 6	Vanderbilt	W 78–64	13–3 (6–2)	Memorial Gymnasium; Nashville, Tennessee
January 28, 1981	No. 7	Mississippi State	W 71–64	14–3 (7–2)	Rupp Arena; Lexington, Kentucky
January 31, 1981	No. 7	Georgia	W 71–68 ^{2OT}	15–3 (8–2)	Stegeman Coliseum; Athens, Georgia
February 4, 1981	No. 6	Auburn	W 102–74	16–3 (9–2)	Rupp Arena; Lexington, Kentucky
February 7, 1981	No. 6	No. 10 Tennessee	L 71–87	16–4 (9–3)	Stokely Center; Knoxville, Tennessee
February 11, 1981	No. 11	Ole Miss	W 62–55	17–4 (10–3)	Tad Smith Coliseum; Oxford, Mississippi
February 14, 1981	No. 11	Alabama	W 77–62	18–4 (11–3)	Rupp Arena; Lexington, Kentucky
February 18, 1981	No. 10	Florida	W 69–56	19–4 (12–3)	O'Connell Center; Gainesville, Florida
February 21, 1981	No. 10	Vanderbilt	W 80–48	20–4 (13–3)	Rupp Arena; Lexington, Kentucky
February 25, 1981	No. 9	Mississippi State	W 78–74	21–4 (14–3)	Rupp Arena; Lexington, Kentucky
March 1, 1981; NBC	No. 9	No. 2 LSU	W 73–71	22–4 (15–3)	Rupp Arena; Lexington, Kentucky
SEC Tournament
March 5, 1981	(2) No. 7	(7) Vanderbilt; Second Round	L 55–60	22–5	Birmingham-Jefferson Civic Center; Birmingham, Alabama
NCAA Tournament
March 15, 1981	(2 ME) No. 8	(7 ME) UAB; Second round	L 62–69	22–6	Memorial Coliseum; Tuscaloosa, Alabama
*Non-conference game. ^{#}Rankings from AP poll. (#) Tournament seedings in parentheses. SE=Southeast.
