= 1980–81 South Alabama Jaguars basketball team =

American college basketball season

1980–81 South Alabama Jaguars men's basketball

Sun Belt Regular season co-champions

NIT tournament, quarterfinals
- Conference: Sun Belt Conference
- East Division
- Record: 25–6 (9–3 Sun Belt)
- Head coach: Cliff Ellis (6th season)
- Home arena: Jaguar Gym; Mobile Municipal Auditorium

1980–81 Sun Belt Conference men's basketball standings
	Conf.				Overall
Team	W		L	PCT	W		L	PCT
VCU †	9	–	3	.750	24	–	5	.828
South Alabama	9	–	3	.750	25	–	6	.806
UAB	9	–	3	.750	23	–	9	.719
South Florida	7	–	5	.583	18	–	11	.621
Jacksonville	4	–	8	.333	8	–	19	.296
UNC Charlotte	3	–	9	.250	10	–	17	.370
Georgia State	1	–	11	.083	4	–	23	.148
† 1981 Sun Belt Conference tournament winner Rankings from AP Poll

The 1980–81 South Alabama Jaguars basketball team represented the University of South Alabama during the 1980–81 NCAA Division I men's basketball season. The Jaguars were led by head coach Cliff Ellis, in his sixth year as head coach. They played their home games at the Mobile Civic Center, and were members of the Sun Belt Conference. South Alabama finished the season 25–6, 9–3 in Sun Belt play to finish tied for first place. They were invited to the NIT tournament, where they lost to Tulsa in the quarterfinals.

== Roster ==
1980–81 South Alabama Jaguars men's basketball team
Players
Coaches

Pos.	#	Name	Height	Weight	Year	Hometown
F		Rory White	6 ft 8 in (2.03 m)	210 lb (95 kg)	Sr	Tuskegee, Alabama
F	15	Ed Rains	6 ft 7 in (2.01 m)	—	Sr	Ocala, Florida

Head coach

- Cliff Ellis (Florida State)

Assistant coach(es)

Legend

- (C) Team captain
- (S) Suspended
- (I) Ineligible
- (W) Walk-on
- Injured
- Current redshirt

== Schedule and results ==
Date time, TV	Rank^{#}	Opponent^{#}	Result	Record	Site (attendance) city, state
Regular season
Dec 1, 1980*		Wisconsin–Parkside	W 86–58	1–0	Jaguar Gym; Mobile, Alabama
Dec 3, 1980*		Middle Tennessee State	L 79–80	1–1	Jaguar Gym; Mobile, Alabama
Dec 5, 1980*		vs. Texas–El Paso; Worcester County Classic	W 77–66	2–1	Hart Center; Worcester, Massachusetts
Dec 6, 1980*		vs. Holy Cross; Worcester County Classic	W 77–53	3–1	Hart Center; Worcester, Massachusetts
Dec 11, 1980*		Tennessee Tech	W 67–48	4–1	Jaguar Gym; Mobile, Alabama
Dec 13, 1980*		Prairie View A&M	W 101–53	5–1	Jaguar Gym; Mobile, Alabama
Dec 16, 1980*		at No. 7 Ohio State	W 76–67	6–1	St. John Arena; Columbus, Ohio
Dec 18, 1980*		at Akron	W 52–49	7–1	Memorial Hall; Akron, Ohio
Dec 29, 1980*		Navy; Senior Bowl	W 65–47	8–1	Jaguar Gym; Mobile, Alabama
Dec 30, 1980*		Fordham; Senior Bowl	W 79–61	9–1	Mobile Municipal Auditorium; Mobile, Alabama
Jan 2, 1981*		Mississippi Valley State	W 98–67	10–1	Jaguar Gym; Mobile, Alabama
Jan 6, 1981	No. 15	at VCU	W 76–62	11–1 (1–0)	Richmond Coliseum; Richmond, Virginia
Jan 8, 1981		at UNC Charlotte	W 92–61	12–1 (2–0)	Belk Gymnasium; Charlotte, North Carolina
Jan 10, 1981		Georgia State	W 74–54	13–1 (3–0)	Jaguar Gym; Mobile, Alabama
Jan 13, 1981		UNC Charlotte	W 80–63	14–1 (4–0)	Jaguar Gym; Mobile, Alabama
Jan 17, 1981*		Nicholls State	W 95–62	15–1	Jaguar Gym; Mobile, Alabama
Jan 22, 1981	No. 11	VCU	L 70–86	15–2 (4–1)	Jaguar Gym; Mobile, Alabama
Jan 24, 1981*		at McNeese State	W 64–60	16–2	Lake Charles Civic Center; Lake Charles, Louisiana
Jan 27, 1981		at Jacksonville	W 55–48	17–2 (5–1)	Jacksonville Coliseum; Jacksonville, Florida
Jan 31, 1981		at UAB	L 70–73	17–3 (5–2)	Birmingham-Jefferson Civic Center (16,131); Birmingham, Alabama
Feb 5, 1981		South Florida	W 54–50	18–3 (6–2)	Jaguar Gym; Mobile, Alabama
Feb 8, 1981		Jacksonville	W 86–65	19–3 (7–2)	Jaguar Gym; Mobile, Alabama
Feb 10, 1981		at Georgia State	W 82–49	20–3 (8–2)	GSU Sports Arena; Atlanta, Georgia
Feb 12, 1981		at South Florida	L 52–70	20–4 (8–3)	USF Sun Dome; Tampa, Florida
Feb 17, 1981		UAB	W 77–57	21–4 (9–3)	Jaguar Gym; Mobile, Alabama
Feb 19, 1981*; 7:30 p.m.		at Illinois State	W 50–44	22–4	Horton Field House (4,572); Normal, Illinois
Sun Belt Conference tournament
Feb 27, 1981*	(2)	vs. (7) Georgia State; Quarterfinals	W 79–41	23–4	Jacksonville Memorial Coliseum; Jacksonville, Florida
Feb 28, 1981*	(2)	vs. (3) UAB; Semifinals	W 86–59	23–5	Jacksonville Memorial Coliseum (5,271); Jacksonville, Florida
NIT tournament
Mar 11, 1981*		Texas–Arlington; First round	W 74–71	24–5	Jaguar Gym; Mobile, Alabama
Mar 16, 1981*		at Georgia; Second round	W 73–72	25–5	Stegeman Coliseum; Athens, Georgia
Mar 20, 1981*		at Tulsa; Quarterfinals	L 68–69	25–6	Mabee Center; Tulsa, Oklahoma
*Non-conference game. ^{#}Rankings from AP Poll. (#) Tournament seedings in parentheses. MW=Midwest. All times are in Central Time.
