= Crooked Zebra =

Book by Bob Weltlich

- Author: Bob Weltlich
- Language: English
- Genre: Crime novel
- Publisher: AuthorHouse
- Publication date: 24 November 2004
- Publication place: United States
- Media type: Print (paperback)
- Pages: 352 pp
- ISBN: 978-1-4208-0846-9
- OCLC: 60642958

Crooked Zebra is a 2004 novel by former University of Texas college basketball coach Bob Weltlich.

== Plot ==
Jim Stanton, the narrator, tells the tale of Bob Girard, a former college basketball player who now runs a popular basketball camp for children in South Florida.

Chad Payne, an eleven-year-old basketball phenom, sneaks into the camp. Girard rescues Chad from a broken home and encourages him. Eventually, Chad grows up, becomes a star and signs with Duke University. Meanwhile, Girard becomes a college basketball referee with troubled finances.

Bob begins to make extra money by fixing games, he becomes so good at it, and so greedy, that he, with support from the mafia, attempts to fix the national championship game.

== Reviews ==
- Bob Knight, former head basketball coach at Texas Tech University and Indiana University, calls Crooked Zebra “Entertaining, exciting and an easy read. This story may be closer to the truth than many people would like to believe... An insightful novel that examines the susceptibility of college basketball to the whims of gamblers...".
- Crooked Zebra has been featured in USA Today, Fort Worth Star-Telegram, Memphis Commercial Appeal and several other newspapers.
