= 1995 TAAC men's basketball tournament =

- Classification: Division I
- Season: 1994–95
- Teams: 8
- Site: UCF Arena; Orlando, FL
- Champions: Florida International (1st title)
- Winning coach: Bob Weltlich (1st title)
- MVP: James Mazyck (Florida International)
- TAAC men's basketball tournaments

1994–95 TAAC men's basketball standings
	Conf.				Overall
Team	W		L	PCT	W		L	PCT
College of Charleston	15	–	1	.938	23	–	6	.793
Samford	11	–	5	.688	16	–	11	.593
Stetson	11	–	5	.688	15	–	12	.556
Mercer	8	–	8	.500	15	–	14	.517
Southeastern Louisiana	7	–	9	.438	12	–	16	.429
Central Florida	7	–	9	.438	11	–	16	.407
Centenary	7	–	9	.438	10	–	17	.370
Georgia State	6	–	10	.375	11	–	17	.393
Florida International †	4	–	12	.250	11	–	19	.367
Campbell	4	–	12	.250	8	–	18	.308
Florida Atlantic		–		–	9	–	18	.333
† 1995 TAAC tournament winner Rankings from AP poll

The 1995 Trans America Athletic Conference men's basketball tournament (now known as the ASUN men's basketball tournament) was held March 2–4 at the UCF Arena in Orlando, Florida.

Eighth-seeded Florida International upset Mercer in the championship game, 68–57, to win their first TAAC/Atlantic Sun men's basketball tournament. FIU became the first team in the history of the TAAC/Atlantic Sun tournament to win the tournament as the lowest-seeded team in the field.

The Golden Panthers, therefore, received the TAAC's automatic bid to the 1995 NCAA tournament, their first Division I tournament appearance.

Even though the TAAC added one more team for the 1994–95 season (Campbell), the tournament field remained fixed at eight. Along with Campbell, fellow newcomers College of Charleston (who won the TAAC regular season title) and Florida Atlantic were not part of the final bracket. Charleston was a transitioning member into Division I and therefore did not play.

== Bracket ==
Quarterfinals; Thursday, March 2
1	Stetson	56
8	Florida International	63
5	Central Florida	70
4	SE Louisiana	81
3	Mercer	90
6	Centenary (LA)	88
7	Georgia State	71
2	Samford	57

Semifinals; Friday, March 3
8	Florida International	65
4	SE Louisiana	64
3	Mercer	81
7	Georgia State	71

Championship; Saturday, March 4
8	Florida International	68
3	Mercer	57
