= 1994–95 FIU Golden Panthers men's basketball team =

American college basketball season

1994–95 FIU Panthers men's basketball

TAAC tournament champions

NCAA tournament
- Conference: Trans America Athletic Conference
- Record: 11–19 (4–12 TAAC)
- Head coach: Bob Weltlich (5th season)
- Home arena: Golden Panther Arena

1994–95 TAAC men's basketball standings
	Conf.				Overall
Team	W		L	PCT	W		L	PCT
College of Charleston	15	–	1	.938	23	–	6	.793
Samford	11	–	5	.688	16	–	11	.593
Stetson	11	–	5	.688	15	–	12	.556
Mercer	8	–	8	.500	15	–	14	.517
Southeastern Louisiana	7	–	9	.438	12	–	16	.429
Central Florida	7	–	9	.438	11	–	16	.407
Centenary	7	–	9	.438	10	–	17	.370
Georgia State	6	–	10	.375	11	–	17	.393
Florida International †	4	–	12	.250	11	–	19	.367
Campbell	4	–	12	.250	8	–	18	.308
Florida Atlantic		–		–	9	–	18	.333
† 1995 TAAC tournament winner Rankings from AP poll

The 1994–95 FIU Golden Panthers men's basketball team represented Florida International University during the 1994–95 NCAA Division I men's basketball season. The Panthers, led by fifth-year head coach Bob Weltlich, played their home games at Golden Panther Arena, and were members of Trans America Athletic Conference. They finished the season 11–19, 4–12 in TAAC play which landed them tied for 8th in the conference regular season standings. They made a surprise run to win the TAAC tournament to secure the conference's automatic bid to the NCAA tournament – the first, and only, appearance in school history. Playing as the No. 16 seed in the West region, FIU was overwhelmed by No. 1 overall seed and eventual National champion UCLA, 92–56, in the opening round.

As of 2025, the Golden Panthers' .367 winning percentage is the lowest to win the conference tournament and make the NCAA tournament.

== Roster ==
1994–95 FIU Panthers men's basketball team
Players	Coaches
Pos. / # / Name / Height / Weight / Year / Previous school / Hometown; F / / James Mazyck / 6 ft 7 in (2.01 m) / — / Sr	Head coach: Bob Weltlich; Assistant coach(es) Legend: (C) Team captain; (S) Suspended; (I) Ineligible; (W) Walk-on; Injured; Current redshirt; Roster

== Schedule ==
Date time, TV	Rank^{#}	Opponent^{#}	Result	Record	Site (attendance) city, state
Regular season
Nov 25, 1994*		at Florida State	L 41–88	0–1	Leon County Civic Center; Tallahassee, Florida
Dec 3, 1994*		Fairleigh Dickinson	W 80–62	1–1	Golden Panther Arena; Westchester, Florida
Dec 7, 1994*		at Alabama	L 54–77	1–2	Coleman Coliseum; Tuscaloosa, Alabama
TAAC tournament
Mar 2, 1995*		vs. Stetson; Quarterfinals	W 63–56	9–18	UCF Arena; Orlando, Florida
Mar 3, 1995*		vs. Southeastern Louisiana; Semifinals	W 65–64 ^{OT}	10–18	UCF Arena; Orlando, Florida
Mar 4, 1995*		vs. Mercer; Championship game	W 68–57	11–18	UCF Arena; Orlando, Florida
NCAA tournament
Mar 17, 1995*; CBS	(16 W)	vs. (1 W) No. 1 UCLA; First round	L 56–92	11–19	BSU Pavilion (11,863); Boise, Idaho
*Non-conference game. ^{#}Rankings from AP Poll. (#) Tournament seedings in parentheses. W=West. All times are in Eastern Time.
