= 1981 SEC men's basketball tournament =

Annual college basketball tournament

- Classification: Division I
- Season: 1980–81
- Teams: 10
- Site: Birmingham-Jefferson Convention Complex; Birmingham, Alabama
- Champions: Ole Miss Rebels (Mississippi) (1st title)
- Winning coach: Bob Weltlich (1st title)
- MVP: Dominique Wilkins (Georgia)
- Attendance: 92,833
- Top scorer: Dominique Wilkins (Georgia) (77 points)
- Television: TVS Television Network

1980–81 Southeastern Conference men's basketball standings
	Conf.				Overall
Team	W		L	PCT	W		L	PCT
No. 4 LSU	17	–	1	.944	31	–	5	.861
No. 8 Kentucky	15	–	3	.833	22	–	6	.786
No. 15 Tennessee	12	–	6	.667	21	–	8	.724
Alabama	10	–	8	.556	18	–	11	.621
Georgia	9	–	9	.500	19	–	12	.613
Ole Miss †	8	–	10	.444	16	–	14	.533
Vanderbilt	7	–	11	.389	15	–	14	.517
Florida	5	–	13	.278	12	–	16	.429
Auburn	4	–	14	.222	11	–	16	.407
Mississippi State	3	–	15	.167	8	–	19	.296
† 1981 SEC tournament winner Rankings from AP Poll

The 1981 SEC men's basketball tournament took place from March 4–7, 1981 at the Birmingham-Jefferson Convention Complex in Birmingham, Alabama. The Ole Miss Rebels, who represent the University of Mississippi, won their first SEC tournament title in the championship game by defeating the Georgia Bulldogs by a score of 66–62. Ole Miss also received the SEC’s automatic bid to the 1981 NCAA Men’s Division I Basketball Tournament. Television coverage of the entire tournament was regionally syndicated by the now-defunct TVS Television Network.

== Bracket ==
First Round; Wednesday, March 4
8	Florida	50
9	Auburn	48
7	Vanderbilt	71
10	Mississippi State	58

Second Round; Thursday, March 5
1	#3 LSU	85
8	Florida	73
4	Alabama	80
5	Georgia	88
2	#7 Kentucky	55
7	Vanderbilt	60
3	#10 Tennessee	71
6	Mississippi	81

Semi-Finals; Friday, March 6
1	#3 LSU	60
5	Georgia	68
7	Vanderbilt	55
6	Mississippi	71

Finals; Saturday, March 7
5	Georgia	62
6	Ole Miss	66
