= 1981 Sun Belt Conference men's basketball tournament =

- Classification: Division I
- Season: 1980–81
- Teams: 7
- Site: Jacksonville Coliseum; Jacksonville, FL
- Champions: VCU (2nd title)
- Winning coach: J.D. Barnett (2nd title)
- MVP: Kenny Stancil (VCU)

1980–81 Sun Belt Conference men's basketball standings
	Conf.				Overall
Team	W		L	PCT	W		L	PCT
VCU †	9	–	3	.750	24	–	5	.828
South Alabama	9	–	3	.750	25	–	6	.806
UAB	9	–	3	.750	23	–	9	.719
South Florida	7	–	5	.583	18	–	11	.621
Jacksonville	4	–	8	.333	8	–	19	.296
UNC Charlotte	3	–	9	.250	10	–	17	.370
Georgia State	1	–	11	.083	4	–	23	.148
† 1981 Sun Belt Conference tournament winner Rankings from AP Poll

The 1981 Sun Belt Conference men's basketball tournament was held February 27–March 1 at the Jacksonville Coliseum in Jacksonville, Florida.

In a rematch of the 1980 final, VCU repeated as tournament champions by defeating UAB in the championship game, 62–61, to win their second Sun Belt men's basketball tournament.

The Rams, in turn, received an automatic bid for the 1981 NCAA tournament, where they advanced to the second round. Runner-up UAB received an at-large bid; the Blazers ultimately won two games before losing to Indiana in the regional semifinals.

== Format ==
With the Sun Belt's forced departure of New Orleans prior to the season, the conference's membership decreased to seven teams. In turn, the top-seeded team was given a bye into the semifinal round. All other teams, again seeded based on regular season conference records, entered the tournament in the quarterfinal round.

The entire tournament was played at the Jacksonville Coliseum in Jacksonville, Florida.

== Bracket ==
Quarterfinals; Friday, February 27
5	Jacksonville	50
4	South Florida	52
3	UAB	80
6	UNC Charlotte	64
7	Georgia State	41
2	South Alabama	79

Semifinals; Saturday, February 28
1	VCU	53
4	South Florida	45
3	UAB	86
2	South Alabama	59

Championship; Sunday, March 1
1	VCU	62
3	UAB	61
