= Mark Cahill =

American author, speaker, and evangelist

- Born: Mark Cahill; March 16, 1962 (age 64); Ridgewood, New Jersey, United States
- Occupations: Evangelist, speaker, author
- Website: MarkCahill.org

Mark Cahill (born March 16, 1962) is an American author, speaker, and evangelist. He is the founder of Mark Cahill Ministries and is the author of seven books. One Thing You Can’t Do in Heaven has over 600,000 copies in print. It has been translated into Russian, Chinese, Spanish, German, Romanian and Nepalese. One Heartbeat Away has over 800,000 copies in print. The Watchmen was released in August 2012. His first novel, Paradise was released in mid 2013 his novel, "Reunion" was released in June 2014. His last two books released were 2015's "The Last Ride" and his latest book was released in the fall of 2017 entitled "Ten Questions from the King" Mark Cahill currently resides in Stone Mountain, Georgia.

== Education ==
Cahill attended Auburn University from 1981 to 1984 on a four-year basketball scholarship. He played forward on the varsity basketball team and was a teammate of Charles Barkley. Mark was named to the Academic All-SEC team (first team) in 1983 and 1984. He was an honorable mention to the Academic All-American team. He earned his bachelor's degree in business.

== Ministry ==
After graduation Cahill spent a few years in the business world, working at IBM and in various management positions. He later converted to Christianity and devoted his life to ministry. Within the year, he became a teacher at a Christian high school. His plans were to teach for the rest of his life, but began a speaking career instead. 2018

== Books ==
- One Thing You Can't Do In Heaven, 2002
- One Heartbeat Away: Your Journey Into Eternity, 2005
- The Watchmen, 2012
- Paradise, 2013
- Reunion, 2014
- The Last Ride, 2015
- "Ten Questions from the King", 2017

== Booklets ==
- "One Second After You ... Die"
- "The Second Greatest Lie Ever Told"
- "The Most Important Question of All Time"
