= 1980–81 Ole Miss Rebels men's basketball team =

American college basketball season

1980–81 Ole Miss Rebels men's basketball

SEC tournament champions

NCAA tournament, First Round
- Conference: Southeastern Conference
- Record: 16–14 (8–10 SEC)
- Head coach: Bob Weltlich (5th season)
- Home arena: Tad Smith Coliseum

1980–81 Southeastern Conference men's basketball standings
	Conf.				Overall
Team	W		L	PCT	W		L	PCT
No. 4 LSU	17	–	1	.944	31	–	5	.861
No. 8 Kentucky	15	–	3	.833	22	–	6	.786
No. 15 Tennessee	12	–	6	.667	21	–	8	.724
Alabama	10	–	8	.556	18	–	11	.621
Georgia	9	–	9	.500	19	–	12	.613
Ole Miss †	8	–	10	.444	16	–	14	.533
Vanderbilt	7	–	11	.389	15	–	14	.517
Florida	5	–	13	.278	12	–	16	.429
Auburn	4	–	14	.222	11	–	16	.407
Mississippi State	3	–	15	.167	8	–	19	.296
† 1981 SEC tournament winner Rankings from AP Poll

The 1980–81 Ole Miss Rebels men's basketball team represented the University of Mississippi in the 1980–81 NCAA Division I men's basketball season. The Rebels were led by fifth-year head coach, Bob Weltlich. The Rebels played their home games at Tad Smith Coliseum in Oxford, Mississippi as members of the Southeastern Conference. This season marked the first NCAA Tournament appearance in school history.

== Schedule and results ==
Date time, TV	Rank^{#}	Opponent^{#}	Result	Record	Site (attendance) city, state
Regular season
December 1980*		Central Arkansas	W 82–50	1–0	Tad Smith Coliseum (2,352); Oxford, MS
December 3, 1980*		at Tennessee Tech	W 59–56	2–0	Eblen Center (3,800); Cookeville, TN
December 6, 1980*		UAB	W 83–72	3–0	Tad Smith Coliseum (3,928); Oxford, MS
December 10, 1980*		at Mercer	W 70–58	4–0	Porter Gym (3,145); Macon, GA
December 17, 1980*		at Bowling Green	L 76–79	4–1	Anderson Arena (3,249); Bowling Green, OH
December 19, 1980*		vs. Jacksonville; Dayton Invitational Tournament	W 59–50	5–1	UD Arena (9,344); Dayton, OH
December 20, 1980*		at Dayton; Dayton Invitational Tournament	L 70–72	5–2	UD Arena (10,021); Dayton, OH
December 23, 1980		at Georgia	L 62–70	5–3 (0–1)	Stegeman Coliseum (6,570); Athens, GA
December 30, 1980*		Memphis State	L 64–69	5–4	Tad Smith Coliseum (7,209); Oxford, MS
January 3, 1981		Auburn	W 46–45	6–4 (1–1)	Tad Smith Coliseum (4,016); Oxford, MS
January 7, 1981		at No. 13 Tennessee	L 68–73	6–5 (1–2)	Stokely Athletic Center (12,700); Knoxville, TN
January 10, 1981		Alabama	L 48–74	6–6 (1–3)	Tad Smith Coliseum (7,003); Oxford, MS
January 14, 1981		at No. 3 Kentucky	L 55–64	6–7 (1–4)	Rupp Arena (23,525); Lexington, KY
January 17, 1981		at Florida	L 71–74	6–8 (1–5)	O'Connell Center (6,815); Gainesville, FL
January 21, 1981		Vanderbilt	W 46–44	7–8 (2–5)	Tad Smith Coliseum (4,819); Oxford, MS
January 24, 1981		at Mississippi State	W 59–52 ^{OT}	8–8 (3–5)	Humphrey Coliseum (7,820); Starkville, MS
January 28, 1981		No. 4 LSU	L 59–63	8–9 (3–6)	Tad Smith Coliseum (7,309); Oxford, MS
January 31, 1981		at Auburn	W 61–58	9–9 (4–6)	Beard–Eaves–Memorial Coliseum (4,881); Auburn, AL
February 4, 1981		No. 10 Tennessee	W 71–52	10–9 (5–6)	Tad Smith Coliseum (7,823); Oxford, MS
February 7, 1981		at Alabama	L 49–51	10–10 (5–7)	Coleman Coliseum (9,236); Tuscaloosa, AL
February 11, 1981		No. 11 Kentucky	L 55–62	10–11 (5–8)	Tad Smith Coliseum (9,321); Oxford, MS
February 14, 1981		Florida	W 66–52	11–11 (6–8)	Tad Smith Coliseum (5,489); Oxford, MS
February 18, 1981		at Vanderbilt	L 50–52	11–12 (6–9)	Memorial Gymnasium (14,782); Nashville, TN
February 21, 1981		Mississippi State	W 72–61	12–12 (7–9)	Tad Smith Coliseum (8,079); Oxford, MS
February 25, 1981		at No. 2 LSU	L 67–74	12–13 (7–10)	Pete Maravich Assembly Center (15,694); Baton Rouge, LA
February 28, 1981		Georgia	W 64–62	13–13 (8–10)	Tad Smith Coliseum (6,108); Oxford, MS
SEC tournament
March 5, 1981; TVS	(6)	vs. (3) No. 10 Tennessee	W 81–71	14–13	Birmingham–Jefferson Civic Center (10,072); Birmingham, AL
March 6, 1981; TVS	(6)	vs. (7) Vanderbilt	W 71–51	15–13	Birmingham–Jefferson Civic Center (10,112); Birmingham, AL
March 7, 1981; TVS	(6)	vs. (5) Georgia	W 66–62	16–13	Birmingham–Jefferson Civic Center (9,743); Birmingham, AL
NCAA tournament
March 13, 1981	(10 MW)	vs. (7 MW) Kansas	L 66–69	16–14	Levitt Arena (10,666); Wichita, KS
*Non-conference game. ^{#}Rankings from AP Poll. (#) Tournament seedings in parentheses. All times are in Central Time.
