= B. L. Graham =

American basketball player and coach (1914–2001)

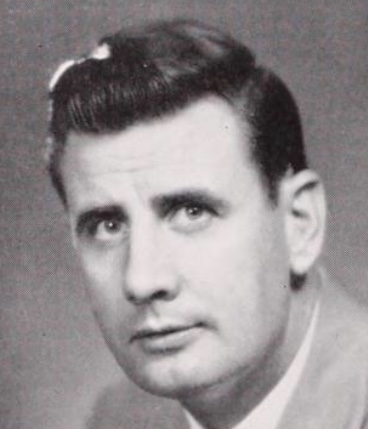
- Graham in 1952

Biographical details
- Born: August 24, 1914
- Died: October 13, 2001 (aged 87); Oxford, Mississippi, U.S.

Playing career

Basketball
- 1935–1938: Ole Miss
- Position: Center

Coaching career (HC unless noted)

Basketball
- 1939–1949: Jones County
- 1949–1962: Ole Miss

Football
- 1947–1949: Jones County

Head coaching record
- Overall: 144–168 (college basketball); 23–7–1 (junior college football)

Accomplishments and honors

Awards
- First-team All-American – Helms (1938); First-team All-SEC (1938)

Bonnie Lee Graham (August 24, 1914 – October 13, 2001) was an American college basketball player and coach at the University of Mississippi (Ole Miss). Graham was an All-American center at the school in 1938 and was head coach from 1949 to 1962.

"Country" Graham came to Ole Miss from Baldwyn High School, which he led the school to the 1932 Mississippi state title. Graham became Ole Miss' first All-American in basketball in 1938 as he was a first-team pick of the Helms Athletic Foundation squad. He pioneered the one-handed hook shot, which was known as ‘Country’s Fade-Away” and using this signature move went on to lead Ole Miss and the Southeastern Conference in scoring as a senior in 1937–38. He also played football at the school during this time.

After the close of his college athletic career, Graham coached both basketball and football at Jones County Junior College in Ellisville, Mississippi, winning state junior college titles in both sports. In 1949, he was named head coach at his alma mater. He coached 13 seasons, compiling a record of 144–168. His 144 victories were the most in school history until 2013 when Andy Kennedy broke the mark. He also was an assistant football coach for the Rebels from 1952 to 1960.

Graham died on October 13, 2001, in Oxford, Mississippi, at the age of 87.

== Head coaching record ==
=== College basketball ===
Record table
| Season | Team | Overall | Conference | Standing | Postseason |
|---|---|---|---|---|---|
Ole Miss Rebels (Southeastern Conference) (1949–1962)
| 1949–50 | Ole Miss | 8–17 | 4–13 | 12th | |
| 1950–51 | Ole Miss | 12–12 | 5–9 | 10th | |
| 1951–52 | Ole Miss | 15–11 | 8–6 | 5th | |
| 1952–53 | Ole Miss | 14–11 | 5–8 | 7th | |
| 1953–54 | Ole Miss | 12–12 | 7–7 | 6th | |
| 1954–55 | Ole Miss | 8–15 | 5–9 | 9th | |
| 1955–56 | Ole Miss | 10–13 | 4–10 | 10th | |
| 1956–57 | Ole Miss | 9–12 | 4–10 | 10th | |
| 1957–58 | Ole Miss | 12–12 | 6–8 | 8th | |
| 1958–59 | Ole Miss | 7–17 | 1–13 | 12th | |
| 1959–60 | Ole Miss | 15–9 | 8–6 | 4th | |
| 1960–61 | Ole Miss | 10–14 | 5–9 | 9th | |
| 1961–62 | Ole Miss | 12–13 | 5–9 | 9th | |
| Ole Miss: | | 144–168 (.462) | 67–117 (.364) | | |
| Total: | | 144–168 (.462) | | | |
