= Cob Jarvis =

American basketball player and coach

Robert Winston "Cob" Jarvis (October 26, 1932 – February 18, 2014) was a star basketball player at the University of Mississippi who went on to become the school's head basketball coach from 1969 to 1976.

He played three seasons with the varsity squad and established 18 school records with the team. He was the first University of Mississippi player to gain first team All-Southeastern Conference basketball honors twice. He averaged 19.3 points per game during his career.

In 1966, Jarvis became Ole Miss' first ever assistant basketball coach. Ole Miss was the last school in the Southeastern Conference to make such a hire. Two years later, he was hired as the school's first ever full-time head basketball coach. Ole Miss was also the last school in the SEC to do that as well. That season was infamous as Jarvis' predecessor Eddie Crawford had been trumpeted by Ole Miss Athletics as having "been promoted" from head basketball to freshman football coach. In his eight seasons as head coach, he led the team to an 87–117 record, including three straight winning seasons from 1971–1972 to 1973–1974.

He didn't play basketball professionally, instead he chose to pursue baseball, which he also played at the University of Mississippi. An outfielder, he spent six seasons in the minor leagues (1954-1959) and played in the Cleveland Indians, New York Yankees and Cincinnati Reds organizations. In 1955, with the Spartanburg Peaches in the Indians system, he hit .361 with 157 hits and 14 triples in 117 games.

He was inducted into the Ole Miss Athletics Hall of Fame in 1988. In 2010, he was named an SEC Basketball Legend.

He died in Eutaw, Alabama.
