= R. L. Sullivan =

American football and basketball coach

Biographical details
- Education: Missouri Normal

Coaching career (HC unless noted)

Football
- 1919–1921: Ole Miss

Basketball
- 1919–1925: Ole Miss

Head coaching record
- Overall: 11–13 (football); 66–32 (basketball)
- Bowls: 0–1

R. L. Sullivan was an American football and basketball coach. He served as the head football coach at the University of Mississippi (Ole Miss) from 1919 to 1921, and compiled a record of 11–13. Sullivan was also the head basketball coach at Mississippi from 1919 to 1925, and compiled a record of 66–32.

== Head coaching record ==
=== Football ===
Year	Team	Overall	Conference	Standing	Bowl/playoffs
Ole Miss Rebels (Southern Intercollegiate Athletic Association) (1919–1921)
1919	Ole Miss	4–4	1–4	T–14th	
1920	Ole Miss	4–3	0–2	T–22nd	
1921	Ole Miss	3–6	0–3	T–25th	L Bacardi
Ole Miss:		11–13	1–9		
Total:		11–13			
