= Bob Weltlich =

American basketball coach

Biographical details
- Born: November 5, 1944 (age 82)
- Education: Ohio State University

Coaching career (HC unless noted)
- 1967–1971: Army (assistant)
- 1971–1976: Indiana (assistant)
- 1976–1982: Ole Miss
- 1982–1988: Texas
- 1990–1995: FIU
- 1997–2002: South Alabama

Head coaching record
- Overall: 300–335 (.472)
- Tournaments: 0–3 (NCAA Division I); 3–4 (NIT)

Accomplishments and honors

Championships
- SEC tournament (1981); SWC regular season (1986); TAAC tournament (1995); TAAC regular season (1993); Sun Belt tournament (1998); 2 Sun Belt regular season (1998, 2000)

Awards
- SEC Coach of the Year (1980); TAAC Coach of the Year (1993); Sun Belt Coach of the Year (2000)
Medal record
Head coach for United States
World Championships
Silver medal – second place	1982 Colombia	USA

Bob Weltlich (born November 5, 1944) is an American former college basketball coach and author. Weltlich coached 22 seasons with a career record of 300–335. He was head coach at the University of South Alabama, Florida International University (FIU), University of Texas and University of Mississippi (Ole Miss). Weltlich is one of only 19 coaches to lead three different programs to the NCAA Division I men's basketball tournament.

== Coaching career ==
=== Indiana ===
Weltlich got his degree in education from Ohio State University in 1967 and was set to teach. He met Army coach and fellow OSU alum Bob Knight in Orrville, Ohio. Knight hired him as an assistant at Army, then took him to Indiana University, where in 1976 he helped coach a 32–0 team to the NCAA title.

=== Ole Miss ===
Weltlich left Indiana to become the head coach at the University of Mississippi. Weltlich manned the Rebel sidelines for six years (1977–1982) and directed Ole Miss to an SEC Tournament title and the program’s postseason debut in 1981. One episode of his aggressive coaching style, foreshadowing criticism levied against him later in his career, followed the team splitting two games in Illinois in 1979; after an all-night marathon bus/plane/bus trip that arrived back on campus on Christmas Day, Weltlich had the team dress for a tape session and practice. (This is described from player Sean Tuohy's point of view in both Michael Lewis' 2006 book The Blind Side, pp. 55–56; and Sean and Leigh Anne Tuohy's own 2010 book "In a Heartbeat, Sharing The Power of Cheerful Giving", p. 48,) Upon setting up the projector to watch film (at 10 am on Christmas Day), Weltlich leaned into Tuohy's ear and said, "Hey Twelve, Merry Fucking Christmas."

=== Texas ===
In 1982, second-year Texas athletic director DeLoss Dodds hired Weltlich from Ole Miss to serve as the next Texas Longhorns men's basketball head coach. Nicknamed "Kaiser Bob" by Longhorn fans for his harshly disciplinarian approach, Weltlich was almost immediately faced with such a manpower shortage from the departures — both voluntary and involuntary — of so many Texas players that he famously had to press Texas male cheerleader Lance Watson into service during the Longhorns' abysmal 6–22 season of 1982–83.

Weltlich coached the US national team in the 1982 FIBA World Championship, winning the silver medal.

Weltlich's next three teams posted yearly improvements in overall records, with the 1985–86 team — which finished with a 19–12 mark and a share of the Southwest Conference Championship — representing the zenith of his tenure at Texas. After his teams finished 14–17 and 16–13 in the 1986–87 and 1987–88 seasons, respectively, Weltlich was dismissed with two years remaining on his contract.

Weltlich compiled a 77–98 record during six seasons as the head coach at Texas. None of his six teams managed an appearance in the NCAA Division I men's basketball tournament; only the 1985–86 team participated in postseason competition, losing 71–65 to Ohio State in the second round of the National Invitation Tournament (NIT).

=== FIU ===
Weltlich served as head coach at Florida International University (FIU) from 1990 to 1995. He led the Panthers to their first regular season and tournament championships, which are still their only ones in program history as of 2024.

The Panthers won the Trans America Athletic Conference title for the 1992–93 regular season with 20 wins, but due to the conference not meeting NCAA qualifying standards, the team was shut out of playing in the NCAA Tournament. On January 15, 1995, he announced his resignation after the season would end, citing it as the best interest for both himself and the university. At the end of the regular season, they were 8–18 and won just four conference games out of 16. They were the 8th of eight seeds in the 1995 TAAC men's basketball tournament. They then proceeded to upset 1 seed Stetson and 4 seed Southeastern Louisiana to reach the Tournament Final versus 3 seed Mercer. They won the game 68–57 to clinch their first appearance in the NCAA Tournament. They set a record for fewest number of wins (11) to reach the NCAA Division I Tournament, a mark since tied by two other teams. Weltlich let the credit for the TAAC title go to the team, stating that his resignation had nothing to do with winning or losing. In the tournament, serving as a 16 seed, they played Jim Harrick's UCLA Bruins and lost 92–56, in the First Round. Notably, in the final postgame news conference, Weltlich had a shirt on with lettering on the front that read: “I need a job.” with his phone number underneath along with “Please leave a message."

=== South Alabama ===
Weltlich was named the interim coach at the University of South Alabama on October 27, 1997 following Bill Musselman's sudden resignation on October 7, 1997. Weltlich coached the Jags from 1997 to 2002 and compiled a record of 81–65 and three 20-win seasons. He resigned from South Alabama after the 2002 season, but he and his family remained in Fairhope, Alabama, where he has worked as a middle school teacher to complete the 10 years of service he needed to qualify for retirement from the state of Alabama.

== Head coaching record ==
Record table
Season	Team	Overall	Conference	Standing	Postseason
Ole Miss Rebels (Southeastern Conference) (1976–1982)
1976–77	Ole Miss	11–16	5–13	9th	
1977–78	Ole Miss	10–17	5–13	9th	
1978–79	Ole Miss	11–16	6–12	8th	
1979–80	Ole Miss	17–13	9–9	5th	NIT second round
1980–81	Ole Miss	16–14	8–10	6th	NCAA Division I first round
1981–82	Ole Miss	18–12	11–7	4th	NIT second round
Ole Miss:		83–88 (.485)	44–64 (.407)		
Texas Longhorns (Southwest Conference) (1982–1988)
1982–83	Texas	6–22	1–15	9th	
1983–84	Texas	7–21	3–13	8th	
1984–85	Texas	15–13	7–9	7th	
1985–86	Texas	19–12	12–4	T–1st	NIT second round
1986–87	Texas	14–17	7–9	T–6th	
1987–88	Texas	16–13	10–6	T–4th	
Texas:		77–98 (.440)	40–56 (.417)		
FIU Panthers (Independent) (1990–1991)
1990–91	FIU	6–22	–		
FIU Panthers (Trans America Athletic Conference) (1991–1995)
1991–92	FIU	11–17	7–7	3rd	
1992–93	FIU	20–10	9–3	1st	
1993–94	FIU	11–16	7–9	6th	
1994–95	FIU	11–19	4–12	T–9th	NCAA Division I first round
FIU:		59–84 (.413)	27–31 (.466)		
South Alabama Jaguars (Sun Belt Conference) (1997–2002)
1997–98	South Alabama	21–7	14–4	T–1st	NCAA Division I first round
1998–99	South Alabama	11–16	6–8	6th	
1999–2000	South Alabama	20–10	13–3	T–1st	
2000–01	South Alabama	22–11	11–5	1st (West)	NIT first round
2001–02	South Alabama	7–21	2–13	6th (West)	
South Alabama:		81–65 (.555)	46–33 (.582)		
Total:		300–335 (.472)			
National champion Postseason invitational champion Conference regular season champion Conference regular season and conference tournament champion Division regular season champion Division regular season and conference tournament champion Conference tournament champion

== Novel ==
In 2004, Weltlich's novel, Crooked Zebra, was released. It tells the story of a college basketball referee who begins to affect outcomes of games based on his gambling habits.
