= Ed Murphy (basketball, born 1941) =

American basketball coach (1941–2020)

Biographical details
- Born: July 1, 1941; Syracuse, New York, U.S.
- Died: February 16, 2020 (aged 78); Carrollton, Georgia, U.S.

Playing career
- 1961–1964: Hardin–Simmons

Coaching career (HC unless noted)
- 1978–1983: West Alabama
- 1983–1986: Delta State
- 1986–1992: Ole Miss
- 1993–2007: West Georgia

Administrative career (AD unless noted)
- 1978–1983: West Alabama
- 1994–2009: West Georgia

Accomplishments and honors

Awards
- 3× GSC Coach of the Year (1981, 1982, 1997)

Edward Gerard Murphy (July 1, 1941 – February 16, 2020) was an American college basketball coach. He was head coach of the Ole Miss Rebels team from 1986 to 1992. He was also the head coach at the University of West Georgia from 1993 to 2007.

Murphy died on February 16, 2020, at age 78.
