= Edwin Hale =

American football player and sports coach (1896–1983)

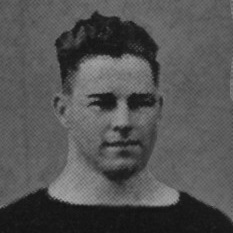

Biographical details
- Born: January 29, 1896; Jackson, Mississippi, U.S.
- Died: March 25, 1983 (aged 87); Jackson, Mississippi, U.S.

Playing career

Football
- 1915–1916: Mississippi College
- 1920–1921: Mississippi College
- Position: Quarterback

Coaching career (HC unless noted)

Football
- 1928–1930: Millsaps
- 1933–1936: Mississippi State (assistant)
- 1937–1945: Ole Miss (assistant)
- 1963–1968: Southern Miss (assistant)

Basketball
- 1933–1935: Mississippi State
- 1942–1945: Ole Miss

Baseball
- 1929–1931: Millsaps
- 1943: Ole Miss

Head coaching record
- Overall: 17–7–4 (football); 43–35 (basketball)

Accomplishments and honors

Awards
- All-Southern (1921); Mississippi Sports Hall of Fame; Millsaps College Sports Hall of Fame
- College Football Hall of Fame; Inducted in 1963 (profile)

Edwin Whitfield "Goat" Hale (January 29, 1896 – March 25, 1983) was an American football player for the Mississippi College Collegians who was elected to the College Football Hall of Fame. After playing, he served many years as a coach.

== Early years ==
Hale was born in Jackson, Mississippi and played high school football at its Central High School. Hale got the nickname "Goat" playing there against Brookhaven in 1914. He battered through the line, scoring a touchdown, and ran past the end zone until his head hit a wooden building, loosening several planks.

== Mississippi College ==
"Goat" played quarterback at Mississippi College from 1915 to 1916 and again from 1920 to 1921, after serving in World War I. He was nominated though not selected for an Associated Press All-Time Southeast 1869-1919 era team. He was elected to the Mississippi Sports Hall of Fame in 1961, and the College Football Hall of Fame in 1963. Hale was also inducted into the Millsaps College Sports Hall of Fame in 1970. He is the name sake of the Hale in Robinson-Hale Stadium, wherein Mississippi College plays it home games. He stood 5'11" and weighed 170 pounds.

=== World War I ===
During the war he was wounded, reported missing, and found later in a hospital in France.

=== 1921 ===
In 1921, Hale scored 161 points and gained 2,160 yards as he was selected All-Southern. "Ten other players are on Hale's teams, but they are there merely to conform with gridiron rules."

== Death ==
Hale died in 1983; he was 87 years old.

== Head coaching record ==
=== Football ===
Year	Team	Overall	Conference	Standing	Bowl/playoffs
Millsaps Majors (Southern Intercollegiate Athletic Association) (1928–1930)
1928	Millsaps	5–3–1	4–2–1	T–8th	
1929	Millsaps	6–1–3	3–1–2	T–9th	
1930	Millsaps	6–3	3–3	T–13th	
Millsaps:		17–7–4	10–6–3		
Total:		17–7–4			
