= Stokely Athletic Center =

Arena in Knoxville, Tennessee

William B. Stokely Athletics Center
- Interactive map of William B. Stokely Athletics Center
- Former names: UT Armory-Fieldhouse (1958–December 1, 1966)
- Address: 1720 Volunteer Blvd; Knoxville, Tennessee; United States
- Coordinates: 35.951226°N 83.929442°W
- Owner: University of Tennessee
- Operator: University of Tennessee
- Capacity: 12,700
- Surface: Tartan, Horner "Pro King" hardwood

Construction
- Groundbreaking: 1957
- Opened: 1958
- Closed: 2012
- Demolished: 2014
- Cost: $1.5 million

Tenants
- Tennessee Volunteers (men's basketball) (NCAA) (1958-1987); Tennessee Lady Vols (women's basketball) (NCAA) (1976-1987); Tennessee Lady Vols (women's volleyball) (NCAA) (1998-2007)

Stokely Athletics Center was an on-campus arena located at the University of Tennessee in Knoxville, Tennessee, United States which was demolished in 2014. It was home to the men's and women's basketball teams from 1958 until the opening of Thompson-Boling Arena in 1987. In 2008, the Lady Vol volleyball team also left Stokely for Thompson–Boling Arena. It was located about a block from both the new arena and Neyland Stadium. The Stokley Center replaced Alumni Gymnasium, a 3,200-seat arena-auditorium built in 1931 which had hosted the SEC basketball tournament four times (1936, '37, '39, and '40).

== History ==
It was originally built in 1958 as the University of Tennessee Armory-Fieldhouse to accommodate larger on-campus crowds. It originally housed 7,800 people in the elongated building, with permanent seating in the west end and temporary seating lining the rest of the arena, which was also used for the ROTC, indoor track, and other events.

Arguably, the most famous basketball game occurred during the historic 1965-66 season. Kentucky had defeated Tennessee 78-64, in Lexington, on February 26, 1966. Notably, Howard Bayne was unable to play for the Vols in that game due to an injured ankle. Kentucky had the next week off, while Tennessee won at Georgia Tech on February 28, 1966, 58-47. Kentucky came into the rematch ranked #1 in the country and was undefeated, at 23-0. Tennessee needed a win just to tie for 3rd in the SEC. On March 5, 1966, a standing room only crowd of over 7,500 in the old UT Armory Fieldhouse (later that year expanded to over 12,000 and renamed Stokely Athletic Center, noted below) witnessed the upset of college basketball's regular season. The Vols led almost the entire way, winning 69-62. Two-sport star Ron Widby, Red Robbins, and Howard Bayne led Tennessee with a combined 52 points and 33 rebounds, while future NBA coaching legend Pat Riley led Kentucky with 22 points. Tennessee finished 20-8, while Kentucky went on to the NCAA Championship game, where they bowed to Texas Western (now UTEP), 72-65, at Maryland's Cole Fieldhouse, and finished 27-2. The historic championship game featured the all-black starting five of Texas Western against the all-white starting five of Kentucky.

By the mid-1960s, the fieldhouse was becoming obsolete for its size, in no small part due to the Vols' rise to prominence under coach Ray Mears. A $500,000 gift from industrialist William B. Stokely, Jr., was the impetus for an expansion to 12,700 seats in 1966, when the building was renamed for Stokely and his family. The cornerstone for the expansion was laid on May 7, 1966. Permanent seating was installed on the other three sides, including balcony seating on the north and south sides. The arena had originally been designed to expand to 12,000 people in the original layout.

Stokely was the home of many great teams, including several SEC titles. It also served as the home of the women's basketball team from midway through the 1976-77 season until the end of the 1986-87 season, which was also the year of their first NCAA women's basketball championship. They hosted the NCAA Mideast regionals in the building. Besides serving as the home of the indoor track and field team, it was also the home of the women's athletics offices. After the basketball teams moved to Thompson-Boling Arena in 1987, Stokely served as an alternate site when the larger arena was booked for events.

Another memorable basketball game played at Stokely didn't even involve a UT team. The NCAA Mideast Regional Final (AKA "The Dream Game") was played there on March 26, 1983, with Louisville beating Kentucky 80-68 in overtime. It was the first game between the two since the 1959 NCAA tournament.

Stokely also was one of Knoxville's premier concert venues during its heyday. Elvis Presley appeared at Stokely on April 8, 1972; March 15, 1974; and May 20, 1977. Portions of the 1972 shows, and other scenes around Knoxville and at McGhee Tyson Airport, were filmed, and brief moments were included in the 1972 MGM documentary Elvis on Tour. Other famous artists to appear at Stokely include Chicago, Elton John, Janis Joplin, Jimmy Buffett, Led Zeppelin, Tina Turner, and Whitney Houston. When Thompson–Boling Arena opened and took over then mantle of being Knoxville's dominant concert venue, several acts that had played Stokely in the 1970s and 1980s began to play Thompson-Boling Arena from the late 1980s onward. On March 31, 1980, one of the greatest upsets in boxing history took place at Stokely when WBA Heavyweight champion John Tate was knocked out in the 15th round by underdog challenger Mike Weaver. Tate had a substantial lead on all three scorecards and there were only 45 seconds left in the fight.

== Demolition ==
In December 2012, it was announced that Stokely Athletics Center would be shutting down all operations by the end of 2012. The bookstore located in the Center would be moving, along with any remaining athletic offices. The old venue would be prepared for demolition to be determined at a later date. Demolition of Stokley Athletic Center and the adjacent Gibbs Hall began in January 2014 and was complete by mid-summer of the same year. Construction began immediately on the former site of a new residence hall and parking garage.
