= 1980–81 Saint Joseph's Hawks men's basketball team =

American college basketball season

1980–81 Saint Joseph's Hawks men's basketball

ECC tournament champions

NCAA tournament, Elite Eight
- Conference: East Coast Conference
- Record: 25–8 (9–2 ECC)
- Head coach: Jim Lynam (3rd season)
- Assistant coach: Jim Boyle
- Home arena: Alumni Memorial Fieldhouse

1980–81 ECC men's basketball standings
	Conf.				Overall
Team	W		L	PCT	W		L	PCT
East
American	11	–	0	1.000	24	–	6	.800
Saint Joseph's †	9	–	2	.818	25	–	8	.758
Temple	9	–	2	.818	20	–	8	.714
La Salle	8	–	3	.727	14	–	13	.519
Drexel	6	–	5	.545	14	–	13	.519
Hofstra	5	–	6	.455	12	–	15	.444
West
Lafayette	8	–	8	.500	15	–	13	.536
Rider	8	–	8	.500	14	–	14	.500
Bucknell	6	–	10	.375	12	–	16	.429
Lehigh	6	–	10	.375	14	–	12	.538
Delaware	3	–	13	.188	6	–	19	.240
West Chester	2	–	14	.125	7	–	20	.259
† 1981 ECC tournament winner Rankings from AP poll

The 1980–81 Saint Joseph's Hawks men's basketball team represented Saint Joseph's University as a member of the East Coast Conference during the 1980–81 NCAA Division I men's basketball season. Led by 3rd-year head coach Jim Lynam, the Hawks finished with an overall record of 25–8 (9–2 in ECC play). Saint Joseph's won the ECC tournament, and received an automatic bid to the NCAA tournament as No. 9 seed in the Mideast region. The team defeated No. 8 seed Creighton, No. 1 seed DePaul, and No. 5 seed Boston College to reach the Elite Eight. The Hawks fell to No. 3 seed and eventual National champion Indiana in the regional final – a game that was played on the Hoosiers' home court.

== Roster ==
1980–81 Saint Joseph's Hawks men's basketball team
Players
Coaches

Pos.	#	Name	Height	Weight	Year	Previous school	Hometown
F	5	Boo Williams	6 ft 8 in (2.03 m)	—	Sr	Phoebus High School	Hampton, Virginia
G	13	Bryan Warrick	6 ft 5 in (1.96 m)	—	Jr	Burlington Township High School	Burlington Township, New Jersey
F	44	John Smith	6 ft 5 in (1.96 m)	—	Sr	Saints Neumann Goretti High School	Philadelphia, Pennsylvania
F	34	Lonnie McFarlan	6 ft 5 in (1.96 m)	—	Fr	Roman Catholic High School	Philadelphia, Pennsylvania
C	23	Tony Costner	6 ft 10 in (2.08 m)	—	Fr	Overbrook High School	Montclair, New Jersey

Head coach

- Jim Boyle

Assistant coach(es)

Legend

- (C) Team captain
- (S) Suspended
- (I) Ineligible
- (W) Walk-on
- Injured
- Current redshirt

== Schedule and results ==
Date time, TV	Rank^{#}	Opponent^{#}	Result	Record	Site city, state
Regular season
Nov 30, 1980*		Scranton	W 76–62	1–0	Alumni Memorial Fieldhouse (1,765); Philadelphia, Pennsylvania
Dec 2, 1980*		at Rider	W 71–55	2–0	Alumni Gymnasium (2,200); Lawrenceville, New Jersey
Dec 6, 1980*		West Chester	W 83–60	3–0	Alumni Memorial Fieldhouse (1,052); Philadelphia, Pennsylvania
Dec 9, 1980*		at Princeton	W 51–50 ^{OT}	4–0	Jadwin Gymnasium (2,210); Princeton, New Jersey
Dec 11, 1980*		at Cornell	W 42–39	5–0	Barton Hall (1,360); Ithaca, New York
Dec 13, 1980*		Jacksonville	W 45–40	6–0	Alumni Memorial Fieldhouse (4,012); Philadelphia, Pennsylvania
Dec 27, 1980*		at Michigan State	L 67–71	6–1	Jenison Field House (6,953); East Lansing, Michigan
Dec 29, 1980*		vs. Bowling Green State	W 87–76	7–1	Cole Fieldhouse (13,211); College Park, Maryland
Dec 30, 1980*		at No. 9 Maryland	L 57–74	7–2	Cole Fieldhouse (13,779); College Park, Maryland
Jan 3, 1981*		Saint Francis (PA)	W 92–72	8–2	Alumni Memorial Fieldhouse (1,722); Philadelphia, Pennsylvania
Jan 7, 1981		at Bucknell	W 66–56	9–2 (1–0)	(2,000)
Jan 10, 1981*		at Jacksonville	W 44–42	10–2	(4,629)
Jan 13, 1981		at Lafayette	W 59–41	11–2 (2–0)	(2,500)
Jan 20, 1981		at Delaware	W 67–56	12–2 (3–0)	(894)
Jan 24, 1981*		UNC Charlotte	W 72–65	13–2	Alumni Memorial Fieldhouse (8,558); Philadelphia, Pennsylvania
Jan 28, 1981*		Penn	W 63–61	14–2	Alumni Memorial Fieldhouse (6,990); Philadelphia, Pennsylvania
Jan 31, 1981		La Salle	L 56–58	14–3 (3–1)	Alumni Memorial Fieldhouse (9,208); Philadelphia, Pennsylvania
Feb 2, 1981*		Albright	W 88–56	15–3	Alumni Memorial Fieldhouse (746); Philadelphia, Pennsylvania
Feb 6, 1981*		vs. No. 10 North Carolina; North-South Doubleheaders	L 64–87	15–4	(10,782); Charlotte, North Carolina
Feb 7, 1981*		vs. NC State	L 42–47	15–5	Reynolds Coliseum (11,198); Raleigh, North Carolina
Feb 11, 1981		vs. Drexel	W 94–72	16–5 (4–1)	Palestra (4,412); Philadelphia, Pennsylvania
Feb 14, 1981		vs. Temple	W 61–58	17–5 (5–1)	Alumni Memorial Fieldhouse (7,151); Philadelphia, Pennsylvania
Feb 16, 1981		Lehigh	W 74–47	18–5 (7–1)	Alumni Memorial Fieldhouse (856); Philadelphia, Pennsylvania
ECC Tournament
Mar 6, 1981*		Temple; Quarterfinals	W 60–55	20–7	Alumni Memorial Fieldhouse; Philadelphia, Pennsylvania
Mar 7, 1981*		vs. Lafayette; Semifinals	W 73–63	21–7	The Palestra; Philadelphia, Pennsylvania
Mar 8, 1981*		vs. American; Championship game	W 63–60	22–7	The Palestra; Philadelphia, Pennsylvania
NCAA Tournament
Mar 12, 1981*	(9 ME)	vs. (8 ME) Creighton; First round	W 59–57	23–7	University of Dayton Arena; Dayton, Ohio
Mar 14, 1981*	(9 ME)	vs. (1 ME) No. 1 DePaul; Second round	W 49–48	24–7	University of Dayton Arena; Dayton, Ohio
Mar 20, 1981*	(9 ME)	vs. (5 ME) Boston College; Mideast Regional Semifinal – Sweet Sixteen	W 42–41	25–7	Assembly Hall; Bloomington, Indiana
Mar 22, 1981*	(9 ME)	vs. (3 ME) No. 9 Indiana; Mideast Regional Final – Elite Eight	L 46–78	25–8	Assembly Hall; Bloomington, Indiana
*Non-conference game. ^{#}Rankings from AP poll. (#) Tournament seedings in parentheses. ME=Mideast.
