= List of Colorado Buffaloes men's basketball head coaches =

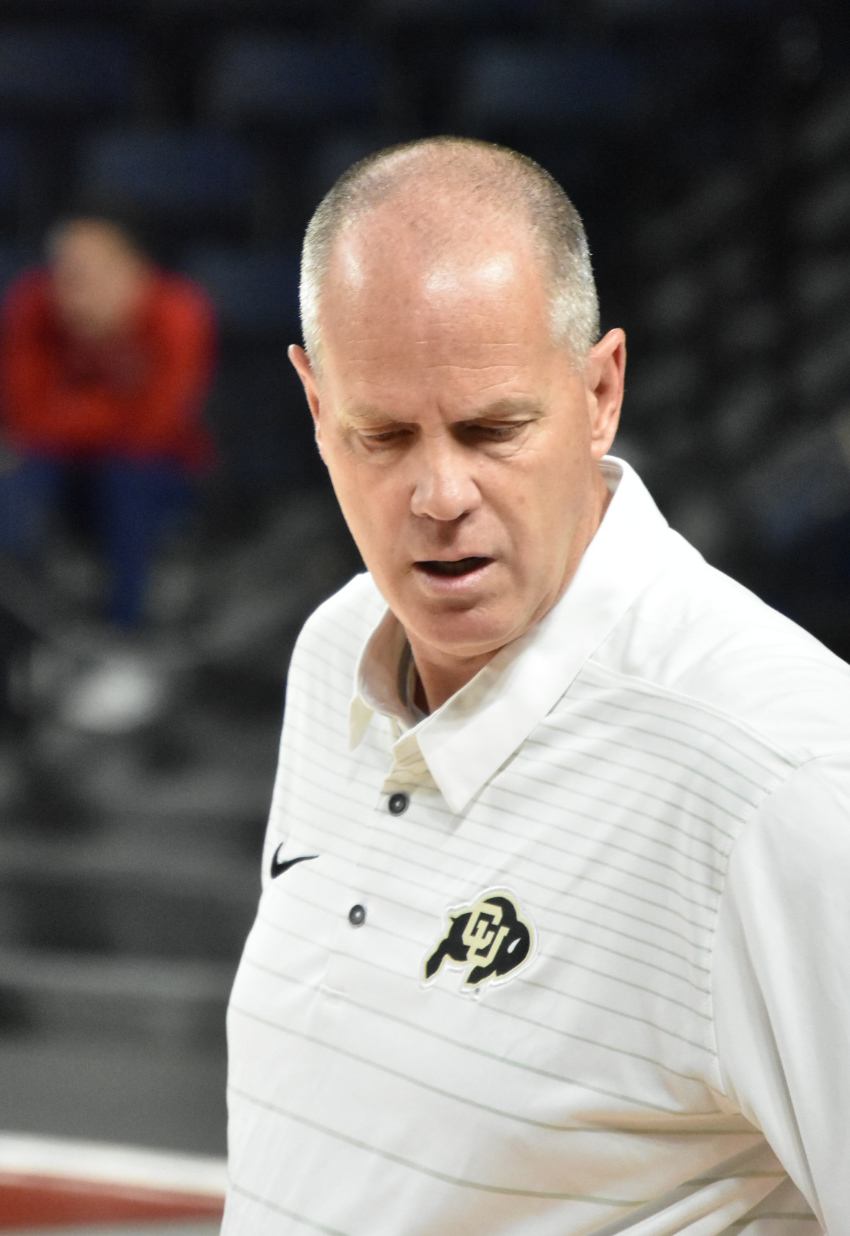
Tad Boyle, the current head coach of the Colorado Buffaloes.

The following is a list of Colorado Buffaloes men's basketball head coaches. There have been 18 head coaches of the Buffaloes in their 124-season history.

Colorado's current head coach is Tad Boyle. He was hired as the Buffaloes' head coach in April 2010, replacing Jeff Bzdelik, who left to become the head coach at Wake Forest.

No.	Tenure	Coach	Years	Record	Pct.
–	1901–1906	No coach	5	18–16	.529
1	1906–1912	Frank Castleman	6	32–22	.593
2	1912–1914	John McFadden	2	10–9	.526
3	1914–1917	James N. Ashmore	3	16–10	.615
4	1917–1918	Bob Evans	1	9–2	.818
5	1918–1924	Enoch J. Mills	6	30–24	.556
6	1924–1933	Howard Beresford	9	76–52	.594
7	1933–1934	Henry Iba	1	9–8	.529
8	1934–1935	Dutch Clark	1	3–9	.250
9	1935–1950 (Note: Colorado did not field a basketball team for the 1942–43 and 1943–44 seasons)	Frosty Cox	13	147–89	.623
10	1950–1956	Bebe Lee	6	63–74	.460
11	1956–1976	Sox Walseth	20	261–245	.516
12	1976–1981	Bill Blair	5	67–69	.493
13	1981–1986	Tom Apke	5	59–81	.421
14	1986–1990	Tom Miller	4	35–79	.307
15	1990–1996 (Note: Harrington resigned as head coach in January 1996. Patton was named interim coach for the remainder of the season.)	Joe Harrington	6	72–85	.459
16	1996–2007 (Note: Patton was named interim head coach in January 1996, and was named permanent head coach on March 5, 1996.)	Ricardo Patton	12	184–160	.535
17	2007–2010	Jeff Bzdelik	3	36–58	.383
18	2010–present	Tad Boyle	16	329–220	.599
Totals		18 coaches	124 seasons	1,456–1,312	.526
Records updated through end of 2025–26 season Source
