= 1980–81 Long Island Blackbirds men's basketball team =

American college basketball season

1980–81 Long Island Blackbirds men's basketball

ECAC Metro tournament champions

NCAA tournament, First round
- Conference: ECAC Metro
- Record: 18–11 ( ECAC-M)
- Head coach: Paul Lizzo (7th season)
- Home arena: Schwartz Athletic Center

1980–81 ECAC Metro men's basketball standings
	Conf.				Overall
Team	W		L	PCT	W		L	PCT
Fordham		–		–	19	–	9	.679
Saint Peter's		–		–	17	–	9	.654
Siena		–		–	17	–	10	.630
Long Island		–		–	18	–	11	.621
Wagner		–		–	16	–	11	.593
Iona		–		–	15	–	14	.517
Fairfield		–		–	13	–	13	.500
Fairleigh Dickinson		–		–	12	–	14	.462
St. Francis (NY)		–		–	10	–	16	.385
Army		–		–	7	–	19	.269
Manhattan		–		–	6	–	20	.231
Rankings from AP Poll

The 1980–81 Long Island Blackbirds men's basketball team represented Long Island University during the 1980–81 NCAA Division I men's basketball season. The Blackbirds, led by head coach Paul Lizzo, played their home games at the Schwartz Athletic Center and were members of the ECAC Metro Conference. They finished the season 18–11. The Blackbirds won the ECAC Metro tournament to earn an automatic bid in the 1981 NCAA tournament where they lost in the opening round to VCU, 85–69.

== Roster ==
1980–81 Long Island Blackbirds men's basketball team
Players	Coaches
Pos. / # / Name / Height / Weight / Year / Hometown; F / 40 / Riley Clarida / 6 ft 7 in (2.01 m) / — / Jr / Brooklyn, New York	Head coach: Paul Lizzo; Assistant coach(es) Legend: (C) Team captain; (S) Suspended; (I) Ineligible; (W) Walk-on; Injured; Current redshirt

== Schedule and results ==
Date time, TV	Rank^{#}	Opponent^{#}	Result	Record	Site (attendance) city, state
Regular season
Dec 2, 1980*		Drexel	W 80–68	1–0	Schwartz Athletic Center; Brooklyn, New York
ECAC Metro tournament
Mar 5, 1981*	(5)	at (4) Wagner	W 89–78	16–10	Sutter Gymnasium; Staten Island, New York
Mar 6, 1981*	(5)	vs. (1) Fordham	W 85–78	17–10	Nassau Coliseum; Uniondale, New York
Mar 7, 1981*	(5)	vs. (6) Iona	W 77–72	18–10	Nassau Coliseum; Uniondale, New York
NCAA tournament
Mar 13, 1981*	(12 E)	vs. (5 E) VCU; First round	L 69–85	18–11	Charlotte Coliseum; Charlotte, North Carolina
*Non-conference game. ^{#}Rankings from AP poll. (#) Tournament seedings in parentheses. E=East. All times are in Eastern Time.
