= 1980–81 Yale Bulldogs men's basketball team =

American college basketball season

1980–81 Yale Bulldogs men's basketball
- Conference: Ivy League
- Record: 7–19 (4–10 Ivy)
- Head coach: Ray Carazo (6th season)
- Home arena: John J. Lee Amphitheater

1980–81 Ivy League men's basketball standings
	Conf.				Overall
Team	W		L	PCT	W		L	PCT
Princeton	13	–	1	.929	18	–	10	.643
Penn	13	–	1	.929	20	–	8	.714
Harvard	9	–	5	.643	16	–	10	.615
Brown	5	–	9	.357	9	–	17	.346
Columbia	5	–	9	.357	9	–	17	.346
Cornell	4	–	10	.286	7	–	19	.269
Yale	4	–	10	.286	7	–	19	.269
Dartmouth	3	–	11	.214	10	–	16	.385
Rankings from AP Poll

The 1980–81 Yale Bulldogs men's basketball team represented Yale University during the 1980–81 men's college basketball season. The Bulldogs, led by 6th year head coach Ray Carazo, played their home games at John J. Lee Amphitheater of the Payne Whitney Gymnasium and were members of the Ivy League. They finished the season 7–19, 4–10 in Ivy League play to finish in sixth place.

== Roster ==
1980–81 Yale Bulldogs men's basketball team
Players
Coaches

Pos.	#	Name	Height	Weight	Year	Hometown
G	4	Joe Conway	6 ft 3 in (1.91 m)	175 lb (79 kg)	Sr	Elizabeth, New Jersey
F	20	Pat Cooper	6 ft 5 in (1.96 m)	175 lb (79 kg)	Jr	Mobile, AL
C	32	Tim Daaleman	6 ft 8 in (2.03 m)	220 lb (100 kg)	Jr	Westfield, New Jersey
F	23	Pete Foley	6 ft 5 in (1.96 m)	195 lb (88 kg)	Fr	Brookfield, Wisconsin
G	33	Butch Graves	6 ft 3 in (1.91 m)	185 lb (84 kg)	Fr	Scarsdale, New York
G	5	Mike Hill	6 ft 1 in (1.85 m)	180 lb (82 kg)	So	Uncasville, New York
G	10	Lew Hyacinthe	5 ft 11 in (1.8 m)	165 lb (75 kg)	Fr	Bronxville, New York
G	35	Fred Lang	5 ft 9 in (1.75 m)	145 lb (66 kg)	Fr	Floral Park, New York
F	25	Steve Leondis	6 ft 4 in (1.93 m)	190 lb (86 kg)	So	Massapequa, New York
G	12	Regis O'Keefe	6 ft 0 in (1.83 m)	160 lb (73 kg)	Sr	Pittsburgh, Pennsylvania
F	21	Gerry Parker	6 ft 6 in (1.98 m)	195 lb (88 kg)	Fr	Flushing, New York
F	22	Doug Stratton	6 ft 4 in (1.93 m)	180 lb (82 kg)	Sr	Osmond, Nebraska
G	34	Bart Williams	5 ft 11 in (1.8 m)	165 lb (75 kg)	Fr	Beverly Hills, California

Head coach

- Ray Carazo

Assistant coach(es)

- Don Burns
- Bruce Helsel

Legend

- (C) Team captain
- (S) Suspended
- (I) Ineligible
- (W) Walk-on
- Injured
- Current redshirt

Roster

== Schedule ==
Date time, TV	Rank^{#}	Opponent^{#}	Result	Record	Site city, state
November 28*		at Holy Cross	L 69–99	0–1	Hart Recreation Center; Worcester, Massachusetts
December 4*		Connecticut	L 53–56	0–2	Payne Whitney Gymnasium; New Haven, CT
December 11*		at Fordham	L 73–85	0–3	Rose Hill Gymnasium; The Bronx, NY
December 26*		at Minnesota	L 56–95	0–4	Williams Arena; Minneapolis, Minnesota
December 27*		vs. Washington	L 62–68	0–5	Williams Arena; Minneapolis, Minnesota
January 3*		vs. Dayton	L 69–79	0–6	University of Dayton Arena; Dayton, Ohio
January 9		Penn	L 59–63	0–7 (0–1)	Payne Whitney Gymnasium; New Haven, CT
January 10		Princeton	L 50–66	0–8 (0–2)	Payne Whitney Gymnasium; New Haven, CT
January 13*		at Army	L 62–77	0–9 (0–2)	USMA Fieldhouse; West Point, NY
January 17		at Dartmouth	L 65–75	0–10 (0–3)	Alumni Gymnasium; Hanover, NH
January 20*		Manhattan	W 78–64	1–10 (0–3)	Payne Whitney Gymnasium; New Haven, CT
January 24*		New Hampshire	W 69–66	2–10 (0–3)	Payne Whitney Gymnasium; New Haven, CT
January 27*		at Fairfield	L 62–74	2–11 (0–3)	Alumni Hall; Fairfield, Connecticut
January 31		Brown	L 65–71	2–12 (0–4)	Payne Whitney Gymnasium; New Haven, CT
February 3		at Harvard	L 94–107	2–13 (0–5)	Malkin Athletic Center; Cambridge, Massachusetts
February 8*		Merrimack	L 77–90	2–14 (0–5)	Payne Whitney Gymnasium; New Haven, CT
February 10		at Brown	L 61–74	2–15 (0–6)	Marvel Gymnasium; Providence, RI
February 13		Columbia	W 76–65	3–15 (1–6)	Payne Whitney Gymnasium; New Haven, CT
February 14		Cornell	W 58–47	4–15 (2–6)	Payne Whitney Gymnasium; New Haven, CT
February 20		at Princeton	L 47–60	4–16 (2–7)	Jadwin Gymnasium; Princeton, NJ
February 21		at Penn	L 55–78	4–17 (2–8)	Palestra; Philadelphia, Pennsylvania
February 24*		Union	W 70–61	5–17 (2–8)	Payne Whitney Gymnasium; New Haven, CT
February 27		at Cornell	W 68–65 ^{OT}	6–17 (3–8)	Barton Hall; Ithaca, NY
February 28		at Columbia	L 49–63	6–18 (3–9)	Levien Gymnasium; New York City
March 6		Harvard	L 75–78 ^{OT}	6–19 (3–10)	Payne Whitney Gymnasium; New Haven, CT
March 7		Dartmouth	W 53–51	7–19 (4–10)	Payne Whitney Gymnasium; New Haven, CT
*Non-conference game. ^{#}Rankings from AP Poll. (#) Tournament seedings in parentheses.
