= 1980–81 Temple Owls men's basketball team =

American college basketball season

1980–81 Temple Owls men's basketball

NIT, Second Round
- Conference: East Coast Conference
- Record: 20–8 (9–2 ECC)
- Head coach: Don Casey (8th season)
- Home arena: McGonigle Hall

1980–81 ECC men's basketball standings
	Conf.				Overall
Team	W		L	PCT	W		L	PCT
East
American	11	–	0	1.000	24	–	6	.800
Saint Joseph's †	9	–	2	.818	25	–	8	.758
Temple	9	–	2	.818	20	–	8	.714
La Salle	8	–	3	.727	14	–	13	.519
Drexel	6	–	5	.545	14	–	13	.519
Hofstra	5	–	6	.455	12	–	15	.444
West
Lafayette	8	–	8	.500	15	–	13	.536
Rider	8	–	8	.500	14	–	14	.500
Bucknell	6	–	10	.375	12	–	16	.429
Lehigh	6	–	10	.375	14	–	12	.538
Delaware	3	–	13	.188	6	–	19	.240
West Chester	2	–	14	.125	7	–	20	.259
† 1981 ECC tournament winner Rankings from AP poll

The 1980–81 Temple Owls men's basketball team represented Temple University as a member of the East Coast Conference during the 1980–81 NCAA Division I men's basketball season.

== Roster ==
1980–81 Temple Owls men's basketball team
Players	Coaches
Pos. / # / Name / Height / Weight / Year / Hometown; G / 43 / Terence Stansbury / 6 ft 5 in (1.96 m) / 185 lb (84 kg) / Fr / Newark, Delaware	Head coach: Don Casey; Assistant coach(es) Legend: (C) Team captain; (S) Suspended; (I) Ineligible; (W) Walk-on; Injured; Current redshirt

== Schedule ==
Date time, TV	Rank^{#}	Opponent^{#}	Result	Record	Site city, state
Regular Season
Dec 1, 1980		at West Chester	W 92–77	1–0 (1–0)	Hollinger Field House
Dec 4, 1980		Lehigh	W 97–62	2–0 (2–0)	McGonigle Hall; Philadelphia, Pennsylvania
Dec 6, 1980		at Delaware	W 61–60	3–0 (3–0)	Delaware Field House
Dec 11, 1980		Point Park	W 105–75	4–0	McGonigle Hall; Philadelphia, Pennsylvania
Dec 13, 1980*		Cincinnati	W 63–48	5–0	McGonigle Hall; Philadelphia, Pennsylvania
Dec 21, 1980*		vs. No. 3 UCLA	L 49–73	5–1	Yoyogi National Gymnasium (5,000); Tokyo, Japan
Dec 26, 1980*		vs. Charlotte	L 65–68	5–2	
Dec 27, 1980*		vs. Maine	W 70–64	6–2	
Jan 6, 1981*		Penn State	W 43–39	7–2	Palestra; Philadelphia, Pennsylvania
Jan 9, 1981*		at Fordham	L 59–62	7–3	Rose Hill Gymnasium; Bronx, New York
Jan 14, 1981*		at Penn	L 49–51	7–4	Palestra; Philadelphia, Pennsylvania
Jan 17, 1981		at Lafayette	W 56–50	8–4 (4–0)	Hersheypark Arena; Hershey, Pennsylvania
Jan 21, 1981*		at South Carolina	W 68–64	9–4	
Jan 24, 1981*		at Manhattan	W 59–53	10–4	
Jan 28, 1981*		William & Mary	W 80–68	11–4	McGonigle Hall; Philadelphia, Pennsylvania
Jan 31, 1981*		vs. Villanova	W 71–68	12–4	Palestra; Philadelphia, Pennsylvania
Feb 4, 1981		Hofstra	W 80–56	13–4 (5–0)	McGonigle Hall; Philadelphia, Pennsylvania
Feb 7, 1981		Drexel	W 84–63	14–4 (6–0)	McGonigle Hall (1,500); Philadelphia, Pennsylvania
Feb 9, 1981		at Rider	W 69–61	15–4 (7–0)	
Feb 14, 1981		vs. Saint Joseph's	L 58–61	15–5 (7–1)	Palestra (7,151); Philadelphia, Pennsylvania
Feb 16, 1981		Bucknell	W 77–59	16–5 (8–1)	McGonigle Hall; Philadelphia, Pennsylvania
Feb 21, 1981		vs. La Salle	W 84–62	17–5 (9–1)	
Feb 25, 1981*		Maine	W 53–51	18–5 (9–1)	McGonigle Hall; Philadelphia, Pennsylvania
Feb 28, 1981		American	L 62–70	18–6 (9–2)	McGonigle Hall; Philadelphia, Pennsylvania
ECC Tournament
Mar 5, 1981*	(3 E)	at (6 E) Hofstra; First round	W 68–63 ^{OT}	19–6	
Mar 6, 1981*	(3 E)	at (2 E) Saint Joseph's; Quarterfinals	L 55–60	19–7	Alumni Memorial Fieldhouse; Philadelphia, Pennsylvania
NIT Tournament
Mar 12, 1981*		at Clemson; First round	W 90–82	20–7	Littlejohn Coliseum; Clemson, South Carolina
Mar 16, 1981*		at West Virginia; Second round	L 76–77 ^{OT}	20–8	WVU Coliseum; Morgantown, West Virginia
*Non-conference game. ^{#}Rankings from AP Poll. (#) Tournament seedings in parentheses. E=Eastern. All times are in Eastern Standard Time.
