= 1980–81 St. Francis Terriers men's basketball team =

American college basketball season

1980–81 St. Francis Terriers men's basketball
- Conference: Independent
- Record: 10–16
- Head coach: Gene Roberti (2nd season)
- Home arena: Generoso Pope Athletic Complex

The 1980–81 St. Francis Terriers men's basketball team represented St. Francis College during the 1980–81 NCAA Division I men's basketball season. The team was coached by Gene Roberti, who was in his second year at the helm of the St. Francis Terriers. The Terriers played their homes games at the Generoso Pope Athletic Complex and played an Independent, not affiliated with a conference.

The Terriers finished their season at 10–16.

== Roster ==
1980–81 St. Francis Brooklyn Terriers men's basketball team
Players
Coaches

Pos.	#	Name	Height	Weight	Year	Previous school	Hometown
G		Mark Woods	6 ft 2 in (1.88 m)	—	Sr
G		Kevin Worth	6 ft 3 in (1.91 m)	—	Jr
G		Jim Paguaga	6 ft 1 in (1.85 m)	—	Jr
G		Ken Berry	5 ft 9 in (1.75 m)	—	Jr
F		Kevin Henry	6 ft 4 in (1.93 m)	—	So
F		Lorenzo Distant	6 ft 5 in (1.96 m)	—	So
G		Darius Pearson	6 ft 3 in (1.91 m)	—	So
F		Joel Carpenter	6 ft 5 in (1.96 m)	—	So
C		Terry Bunn	6 ft 7 in (2.01 m)	—	So
C		Michael Lalpuis	6 ft 7 in (2.01 m)	—	So
F		Don Beale	6 ft 4 in (1.93 m)	—	So

Head coach

- Gene Roberti

Assistant coach(es)

Legend

- (C) Team captain
- (S) Suspended
- (I) Ineligible
- (W) Walk-on
- Injured
- Current redshirt

== Schedule and results ==
Date time, TV	Opponent	Result	Record	Site (attendance) city, state
Regular Season
December 2, 1980*	at Villanova	L 73–95	0–1	Jake Nevin Field House (2,200); Villanova, PA
December 5, 1980*	vs. Virginia State	L 73–85	0–2	Robins Center (2,600); Richmond, VA
December 6, 1980*	vs. Catholic	W 67–58	1–2	Robins Center (2,600); Richmond, VA
December 10, 1980*	at Saint Peter's	L 47–62	1–3	Jersey City Armory (7,208); Jersey City, NJ
December 13, 1980*	at Siena	L 57–59	1–4	Alumni Recreation Center (2,972); Albany, NY
December 15, 1980*	at Drexel	L 57–80	1–5	Daskalakis Athletic Center (210); Philadelphia, PA
December 19, 1980*	at West Virginia	L 38–64	1–6	WVU Coliseum (3,140); Morgantown, WV
December 20, 1980*	vs. Delaware	W 60–53	2–6	WVU Coliseum (4,296); Morgantown, WV
December 30, 1980*	Hofstra	L 52–62	2–7	Physical Fitness Center (1,500); Hempstead, NY
January 3, 1981*	at Boston University	L 64–73	2–8	Case Gym (675); Boston, MA
January 7, 1981*	at Dartmouth	L 62–68	2–9	Alumni Gymnasium (500); Hanover, NH
January 10, 1981*	at Saint Francis (PA)	L 67–69	2–10	DeGol Arena (1,700); Loretto, PA
January 14, 1981*	at Long Island	L 67–85	2–11	Schwartz Athletic Center (825); Brooklyn, NY
January 17, 1981*	U of Baltimore	W 69–64	3–11	Generoso Pope Athletic Complex (900); Brooklyn, NY
January 22, 1981*	at Army	W 63–62	4–11	Gillis Field House (2,512); West Point, NY
January 29, 1981*	CCNY	W 80–53	5–11	Generoso Pope Athletic Complex (956); Brooklyn, NY
January __, 1981*	Marist	W 57–56	6–11	Generoso Pope Athletic Complex (400); Brooklyn, NY
February 2, 1981*	Canisius	L 67–72	6–12	Generoso Pope Athletic Complex (250); Brooklyn, NY
February 4, 1981*	Robert Morris	W 74–64	7–12	Generoso Pope Athletic Complex (400); Brooklyn, NY
February __, 1981*	Pace	W 97–76	8–12	Generoso Pope Athletic Complex (966); Brooklyn, NY
February 11, 1981*	at Wagner	L 69–70	8–13	Sutter Memorial Gymnasium (1,000); Staten Island, NY
February 14, 1981*	at Northeastern	L 60–73	8–14	Matthews Arena (1,161); Boston, MA
February 17, 1981*	Catholic	W 70–63	9–14	Generoso Pope Athletic Complex (550); Brooklyn, NY
February 21, 1981*	at Towson	L 63–69	9–15	Towson Center (1,072); Towson, MD
February 23, 1981*	Manhattan	W 78–61	10–15	Generoso Pope Athletic Complex (1,500); Brooklyn, NY
February 28, 1981*	at Fairleigh Dickinson	L 84–94	10–16	(1,000); Rutherford, NJ
*Non-conference game. ^{#}Rankings from AP Poll. (#) Tournament seedings in parentheses. All times are in Eastern Time.
