= 1980–81 Penn Quakers men's basketball team =

American college basketball season

1980–81 Penn Quakers men's basketball

NIT, First Round
- Conference: Ivy League
- Record: 20–8 (13–1 Ivy)
- Head coach: Bob Weinhauer (4th season)
- Home arena: The Palestra

1980–81 Ivy League men's basketball standings
	Conf.				Overall
Team	W		L	PCT	W		L	PCT
Princeton	13	–	1	.929	18	–	10	.643
Penn	13	–	1	.929	20	–	8	.714
Harvard	9	–	5	.643	16	–	10	.615
Brown	5	–	9	.357	9	–	17	.346
Columbia	5	–	9	.357	9	–	17	.346
Cornell	4	–	10	.286	7	–	19	.269
Yale	4	–	10	.286	7	–	19	.269
Dartmouth	3	–	11	.214	10	–	16	.385
Rankings from AP Poll

The 1980–81 Penn Quakers men's basketball team represented the University of Pennsylvania during the 1980–81 NCAA Division I men's basketball season. The Quakers, coached by Bob Weinhauer, played in the Ivy League and had a 20–8 win–loss record.

== Roster ==
1980–81 Penn Quakers men's basketball team
Players
Coaches

Pos.	#	Name	Height	Weight	Year	Hometown
F	45	Michael Brown	6 ft 6 in (1.98 m)	193 lb (88 kg)	So	Las Vegas, Nevada
G	33	Ken Hall	6 ft 2 in (1.88 m)	185 lb (84 kg)	Sr	Atlanta, Georgia
G	5	Dave Jackson	6 ft 3 in (1.91 m)	180 lb (82 kg)	Jr	Wyandanch, New York
F	10	David Lardner	6 ft 6 in (1.98 m)	180 lb (82 kg)	So	Auburn, California
F	40	Tom Leifsen	6 ft 9 in (2.06 m)	213 lb (97 kg)	Jr	Millburn, New Jersey
F	11	Paul Little	6 ft 5 in (1.96 m)	185 lb (84 kg)	So	Dorchester, Boston
G	3	George May	6 ft 0 in (1.83 m)	170 lb (77 kg)	Fr	Philadelphia, Pennsylvania
G	23	Fran McCaffery	6 ft 4 in (1.93 m)	180 lb (82 kg)	Jr	Philadelphia, Pennsylvania
C	50	George Noon	6 ft 8 in (2.03 m)	220 lb (100 kg)	So	Bel Air, Maryland
F	14	Scott Oleson	6 ft 7 in (2.01 m)	205 lb (93 kg)	Sr	Wausau, Wisconsin
G	21	Willie Oliphant	6 ft 3 in (1.91 m)	174 lb (79 kg)	Fr	Philadelphia, Pennsylvania
C	24	Avery Rawlings	6 ft 9 in (2.06 m)	175 lb (79 kg)	So	Atlanta, Georgia
G	12	Angelo Reynolds	6 ft 2 in (1.88 m)	180 lb (82 kg)	Jr	Philadelphia, Pennsylvania
F	22	Vincent Ross	6 ft 8 in (2.03 m)	185 lb (84 kg)	Jr	Philadelphia, Pennsylvania

Head coach

- Bob Weinhauer

Assistant coach(es)

- Dennis Jackson
- Tom Schneieder

Legend

- (C) Team captain
- (S) Suspended
- (I) Ineligible
- (W) Walk-on
- Injured
- Current redshirt

== Schedule ==
Date time, TV	Rank^{#}	Opponent^{#}	Result	Record	Site city, state
November 28*		vs. Weber State; Lapchick Tournament Opening Round	W 68–56	1–0	Alumni Hall; Queens, NY
November 29*		at No. 17 St. John's; Lapchick Tournament Opening Round	L 62–68	1–1	Alumni Hall; Queens, NY
December 10*		Saint Francis (PA)	W 76–56	2–1	Palestra; Philadelphia, Pennsylvania
December 20*		Davidson	W 92–60	3–1	Palestra; Philadelphia, Pennsylvania
December 22*		at Duke	L 82–88	3–2	Cameron Indoor Stadium; Durham, North Carolina
December 26*		at St. John's; ECAC Holiday Festival Semifinal	L 58–66	3–3	Madison Square Garden; New York, New York
December 27*		vs. Iona; ECAC Holiday Festival	W 82–66	4–3	Madison Square Garden; New York, New York
January 3*		at Georgetown	W 60–58	5–3	McDonough Gymnasium; Washington, DC
January 9		at Yale	W 63–59	6–3 (1–0)	Payne Whitney Gymnasium; New Haven, CT
January 10		at Brown	W 70–57	7–3 (2–0)	Marvel Gymnasium; Providence, RI
January 14*		Temple	W 51–49	8–3 (2–0)	Palestra; Philadelphia, Pennsylvania
January 17*		Villanova	L 55–68	8–4 (2–0)	Palestra; Philadelphia, Pennsylvania
January 28*		Saint Joseph's	L 61–63	8–5 (2–0)	Palestra; Philadelphia, Pennsylvania
January 31		at Princeton	L 61–62	8–6 (2–1)	Jadwin Gymnasium; Princeton, NJ
February 6		at Columbia	W 67–51	9–6 (3–1)	Levien Gymnasium; New York City
February 7		at Cornell	W 61–49	10–6 (4–1)	Barton Hall
February 13		Harvard	W 73–63	11–6 (5–1)	Palestra; Philadelphia, Pennsylvania
February 14		Dartmouth	W 71–64	12–6 (6–1)	Palestra; Philadelphia, Pennsylvania
February 17*		vs. La Salle	W 67–62	13–6 (6–1)	Palestra; Philadelphia, Pennsylvania
February 20		Brown	W 66–58	14–6 (7–1)	Palestra; Philadelphia, Pennsylvania
February 21		Yale	W 78–55	15–6 (8–1)	Palestra; Philadelphia, Pennsylvania
February 24		Princeton	W 52–43	16–6 (9–1)	Palestra; Philadelphia, Pennsylvania
February 27		at Dartmouth	W 69–59	17–6 (10–1)	Alumni Gym
February 28		at Harvard	W 83–70	18–6 (11–1)	Lavietes Pavilion
March 6		Cornell	W 68–56	19–6 (12–1)	Palestra; Philadelphia, Pennsylvania
March 7		Columbia	W 76–71	20–6 (13–1)	Palestra; Philadelphia, Pennsylvania
Ivy League tournament
March 10		vs. Princeton	L 40–54	20–7 (13–1)	Allan P. Kirby Field House
National Invitation Tournament
March 13*		at West Virginia; NIT First Round	L 64–67	20–8 (13–1)	WVU Coliseum; Morgantown, WV
*Non-conference game. ^{#}Rankings from AP Poll. (#) Tournament seedings in parentheses.
