= 1980–81 Drexel Dragons men's basketball team =

American college basketball season

1980–81 Drexel Dragons men's basketball
- Conference: East Coast Conference
- East
- Record: 14–13 (6–5 ECC)
- Head coach: Eddie Burke (4th season)
- Home arena: Daskalakis Athletic Center

1980–81 ECC men's basketball standings
	Conf.				Overall
Team	W		L	PCT	W		L	PCT
East
American	11	–	0	1.000	24	–	6	.800
Saint Joseph's †	9	–	2	.818	25	–	8	.758
Temple	9	–	2	.818	20	–	8	.714
La Salle	8	–	3	.727	14	–	13	.519
Drexel	6	–	5	.545	14	–	13	.519
Hofstra	5	–	6	.455	12	–	15	.444
West
Lafayette	8	–	8	.500	15	–	13	.536
Rider	8	–	8	.500	14	–	14	.500
Bucknell	6	–	10	.375	12	–	16	.429
Lehigh	6	–	10	.375	14	–	12	.538
Delaware	3	–	13	.188	6	–	19	.240
West Chester	2	–	14	.125	7	–	20	.259
† 1981 ECC tournament winner Rankings from AP poll

The 1980–81 Drexel Dragons men's basketball team represented Drexel University during the 1980–81 NCAA Division I men's basketball season. The Dragons, led by 4th year head coach Eddie Burke, played their home games at the Daskalakis Athletic Center and were members of the East Coast Conference (ECC).

The team finished the season 14–13, and finished in 5th place in the ECC East in the regular season.

== Roster ==
1980–81 Drexel Dragons men's basketball team
Players
Coaches

Pos.	#	Name	Height	Weight	Year	Previous school	Hometown
		Len Hatzenbeller	6 ft 9 in (2.06 m)	—	Sr
			—	—

Head coach

- Eddie Burke (La Salle)

Assistant coach(es)

Legend

- (C) Team captain
- (S) Suspended
- (I) Ineligible
- (W) Walk-on
- Injured
- Current redshirt

== Schedule ==
Date time, TV	Rank^{#}	Opponent^{#}	Result	Record	High points	High rebounds	High assists	Site (attendance) city, state
Regular season
November 29, 1980		Delaware	W 50–43	1–0 (1–0)	–	–	–	Daskalakis Athletic Center (300); Philadelphia, PA
December 2, 1980*		at Long Island	L 68–80	1–1	–	–	–	Schwartz Athletic Center (750); Brooklyn, NY
December 13, 1980		at West Chester	W 59–58	2–1 (2–0)	–	–	–	Hollinger Field House (150); West Chester, PA
December 15, 1980*		St. Francis (NY)	W 80–57	3–1	–	–	–	Daskalakis Athletic Center (200); Philadelphia, PA
December 1980*		at US International	L 61–64 ^{OT}	3–2	–	–	–	(100)
December 23, 1980*		at USC	L 53–82	3–3	–	–	–	L. A. Sports Arena (1,774); Los Angeles, CA
January 3, 1981*		Catholic University	W 64–57	4–3	–	–	–	Daskalakis Athletic Center (200); Philadelphia, PA
January 1981*		Marist	W 67–50	5–3	–	–	–	Daskalakis Athletic Center (300); Philadelphia, PA
January 10, 1981*		Boston University	W 71–63	6–3	–	–	–	Daskalakis Athletic Center (500); Philadelphia, PA
January 14, 1981		at Lehigh	W 70–58	7–3 (3–0)	–	–	–	Stabler Arena (1,000); Bethlehem, PA
January 17, 1981*		Northeastern	L 65–77	7–4	–	–	–	(1,700)
January 19, 1981		at Bucknell	W 56–55	8–4 (4–0)	–	–	–	(1,300)
January 21, 1981		Rider	W 81–60	9–4 (5–0)	36 – Hatzenbeller	–	–	Daskalakis Athletic Center (500); Philadelphia, PA
January 24, 1981		at Lafayette	W 73–64	10–4 (6–0)	–	–	–	(1,500)
January 28, 1981*		Fairleigh Dickinson	L 67–69	10–15	–	–	–	Daskalakis Athletic Center (300); Philadelphia, PA
January 31, 1981*		at Maine	L 51–57	10–6	–	–	–	(1,900)
February 2, 1981*		at Niagara	W 73–60	11–6	–	–	–	(1,029)
February 7, 1981		at Temple	L 63–84	11–7 (6–1)	–	–	–	McGonigle Hall (1,500); Philadelphia, PA
February 11, 1982		vs. Saint Joseph's	L 72–94	11–8 (6–2)	–	–	–	Palestra (4,412); Philadelphia, PA
February 14, 1981*		at Penn State	L 58–71	11–9	–	–	–	(2,988)
February 16, 1981		at American	L 74–85	11–10 (6–3)	–	–	–	Fort Myer Ceremonial Hall (1,550); Arlington, VA
February 21, 1981		at Hofstra	L 55–73	11–11 (6–4)	–	–	–	(900)
February 23, 1981*		Loyola (MD)	W 58–51	12–11	–	–	–	Daskalakis Athletic Center (410); Philadelphia, PA
February 25, 1981; 7:00 pm		La Salle	L 52–63	12–12 (6–5)	–	–	–	Daskalakis Athletic Center (711); Philadelphia, PA
February 28, 1981*		Wagner	W 74–73	13–12	–	–	–	(1,800)
ECC Tournament
March 2, 1981	(5 E)	at (4 E) La Salle; First Round	W 69–66	14–12	–	–	–	Hayman Hall (500)
March 1981	(5 E)	at (1 E) American; Quarterfinals	L 60–62	14–13	–	–	–	Fort Myer Ceremonial Hall (2,100); Arlington, VA
*Non-conference game. ^{#}Rankings from AP. (#) Tournament seedings in parentheses. E=East. All times are in Eastern Time.

== Awards ==
Len Hatzenbeller

- ECC Player of the Year
- ECC All-Conference First Team

Mike Mitchell

- ECC All-Rookie Team
