= Jim Lynam =

American basketball coach (born 1941)

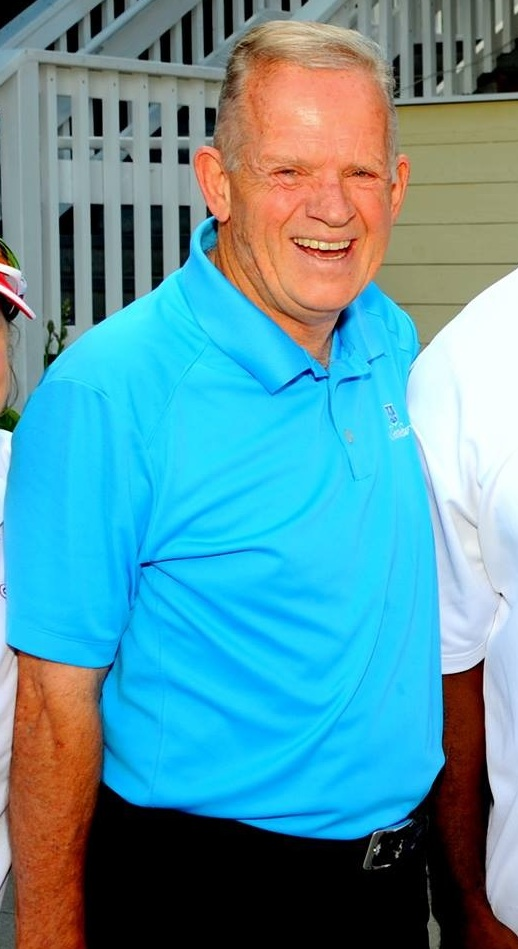
- Lynam in 2022

Personal information
- Born: September 15, 1941 (age 85) Philadelphia, Pennsylvania, U.S.
- Listed height: 6 ft 1 in (1.85 m)
- Listed weight: 185 lb (84 kg)

Career information
- High school: West Catholic (Philadelphia, Pennsylvania)
- College: Saint Joseph's (1960–1963)
- NBA draft: 1963: undrafted
- Coaching career: 1968–2010

Career history

Coaching
- 1968–1970: Fairfield
- 1973–1978: American
- 1978–1981: Saint Joseph's
- 1981–1984: Portland Trail Blazers (assistant)
- 1983–1985: San Diego / Los Angeles Clippers
- 1985–1988: Philadelphia 76ers (assistant)
- 1988–1992: Philadelphia 76ers
- 1994–1997: Washington Bullets
- 1998–2000: New Jersey Nets (assistant)
- 2001–2005: Portland Trail Blazers (assistant)
- 2005–2010: Philadelphia 76ers (assistant)

Career highlights
- As player: Robert V. Geasey Trophy co-winner (1963); No. 4 retired by Saint Joseph's Hawks; As coach: 2× ECC regular season champion (1975, 1980); ECC tournament champion (1981)

Career coaching record
- NBA: 328–392 (.456)
- NCAA: 158–118 (.572)
- Record at Basketball Reference

James Francis Lynam (born September 15, 1941) is an American former college and professional basketball coach. He coached at the college level for Fairfield University from 1968 to 1970, American University from 1973 to 1978, and St. Joseph's University from 1978 to 1981. In the National Basketball Association (NBA), Lynam coached the San Diego / Los Angeles Clippers from 1983 to 1985, the Philadelphia 76ers from 1987 to 1992, and the Washington Bullets from 1995 to 1997. Lynam compiled a 158–118 record at the college level, and 328–392 in the NBA. He was also Philadelphia's general manager from 1992 to 1994.

== Playing career ==
After graduating from West Catholic High School, he went to Saint Joseph's University. With the Hawks, he was a three-year starter. In 1961, Lynam was a key player on a Hawks team that advanced to the 1961 Final Four. The Hawks defeated Utah in a four-overtime game for third place. Lynam won the team MVP award after Jack Egan was expelled for his participation in the 1961 point shaving scandal.

Lynam played with the Hawks until 1963. That year, he was named the MVP of the Big 5 in his senior year.

== Coaching career ==
He began his coaching career at Lansdale Catholic High School in Lansdale, Pa where he was the head boys' basketball coach for the 1964–65 season. He then coached the Fairfield Stags men's basketball in 1968 where he coached for two years. In 1973, he took the reins at American University in 1973, where he coached for five years. He coached the Eagles to a finals appearance in the East Coast Conference tournament in 1975.

In 1978, he returned to his alma mater St. Joseph's. In 1980–81, he coached the Hawks to an ECC Tournament championship, to receive a bid to the NCAA tournament. As a #9 seed, the Hawks defeated Creighton in the first round and upset the #1 seeded and #1 ranked DePaul to reach the Sweet Sixteen. The Hawks then defeated Boston College to advance to the Elite Eight, where their Cinderella run would end by losing to eventual national champion Indiana.

On May 18, 1981, Lynam accepted an offer to be an assistant coach for the Portland Trail Blazers. Portland's coach Jack Ramsay previously coached Lynam at St. Joseph's. In his second year in Portland, the Blazers won their first playoff series since their championship season of 1976–77, though they would lose in the second round to the Los Angeles Lakers.

After two years with Portland, Lynam was named head coach of the San Diego Clippers. San Diego native and franchise cornerstone Bill Walton was largely unavailable due to injury and generally frustrated with new Clippers Owner Donald Sterling (Sterling controversially moved the Clippers to Los Angeles overnight, despite not getting approval from the league). Manute Bol, who Lynam scouted and drafted, was later ruled ineligible for the NBA draft, essentially wasting the draft pick. After a tumultuous year and a half with the Clippers, which saw him as their last coach in San Diego, first coach in Los Angeles and first coaching hire by Sterling, he was fired as coach midway through his second season.

Retiring 76ers coach Billy Cunningham was critical of the Clippers for firing Lynam, and was instrumental in Philadelphia hiring him as an assistant coach prior to the 1985–86 season. Sixers All Star point guard Maurice Cheeks said he had "never seen a better communicator than Jim Lynam." Lynam's popularity with Sixers players would eventually help him become head coach of the team midway through the 1987–88.

The season he took over was Philadelphia's first without Julius Erving or Moses Malone since 1975. In his first full season as coach, he brought the Sixers back to the playoffs. In his second season, Philadelphia won the Atlantic Division title with a 53–29 record, earning the second seed in the conference. Though finally surpassing the Larry Bird Celtics for the first time in the Charles Barkley-era in Philadelphia, they fell to Michael Jordan's Bulls in back-to-back playoffs.

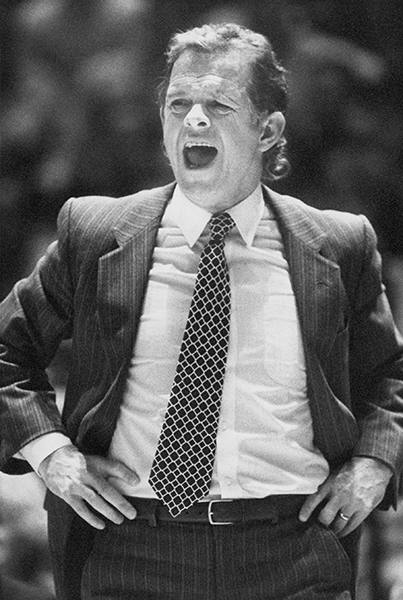
Lynam as Philadelphia 76ers head coach in 1990

After a 7–3 start to the 1991–92 season, injuries decimated the team and they stumbled to a 35–47 record, missing the playoffs. Barkley was unhappy with team owner Harold Katz over his controversial team decisions, such as trading Moses Malone to Washington, trading the first overall pick in the 1986 NBA draft to Cleveland, and letting Rick Mahorn leave as a free agent among other moves, which were viewed as reasons Philadelphia unraveled from a perennial contender in the 1980s to missing the playoffs in 1992.

Katz agreed to step away from the operational side of the team and hand the team decision making to Lynam, moving him from coach to general manager. As general manager, Lynam hired Doug Moe to be his replacement as Sixers coach.

Lynam spent two years as Sixers general manager, before accepting an offer to become coach of the Washington Bullets prior the 1994–95 season. On February 6, 1997, Lynam was fired as coach. Following his dismissal from Washington, Lynam joined John Calipari's staff with the New Jersey Nets.

When his former point guard with the Sixers Maurice Cheeks was hired by the Trail Blazers in 2001, he hired Lynam to his coaching staff. When Cheeks was hired as Philadelphia's coach for the 2005–06 season, Lynam was named an assistant. During the preseason, however, he was forced to leave the team due to an undisclosed medical condition. However, on September 29, 2006, it was announced that Lynam, along with NBA hall of famer Moses Malone would be rejoining the 76ers as an assistant coach. In July 2010, The Oregonian reported that Lynam was among candidates for an assistant coaching job in Portland. He remained in this role until 2010.

The Minnesota Timberwolves brought in Lynam as a part-time basketball operations consultant, evaluating pro personnel on the Wolves roster and throughout the NBA for part of the 2010–11 season. He retired from coaching and basketball operations in 2011 and moved to a broadcasting career. Since the start of the 2011–12 season, Lynam served as a pre-game and post-game analyst for the Philadelphia 76ers on NBC Sports Philadelphia.

== Personal ==
Lynam's daughter, Dei, is a former anchor/reporter for NBC Sports Philadelphia for the Sixers. She once served as a sideline reporter for 76ers telecasts. She also worked as a Sideline Reporter for TNT's coverage of the NBA Playoffs from 2010 to 2015. Now she helps call the 76ers G-League team, the Delaware Blue Coats games. He is also a grandfather to ten grandchildren. Lynam is known for his distinct Philadelphia accent.

== Head coaching record ==
=== College ===
Record table
Season	Team	Overall	Conference	Standing	Postseason
Fairfield Stags (Independent) (1968–1970)
1968–69	Fairfield	10–16			
1969–70	Fairfield	13–13			
Fairfield:		23–29			
American Eagles (Middle Atlantic Conferences) (1973–1974)
1973–74	American	16–10	4–2	T–3rd (East)	
American Eagles (East Coast Conference) (1974–1978)
1974–75	American	16–10	5–1	T–1st (East)	
1975–76	American	9–16	1–4	T–5th (East)	
1976–77	American	13–13	2–3	T–4th (East)	
1977–78	American	16–12	2–3	T–3rd (East)	
American:		70–61	14–13		
Saint Joseph's Hawks (East Coast Conference) (1978–1981)
1978–79	Saint Joseph's	19–11	11–3	2nd (East)	NIT First Round
1979–80	Saint Joseph's	21–9	10–1	1st (East)	NIT First Round
1980–81	Saint Joseph's	25–8	9–2	T–2nd (East)	NCAA Division I Elite Eight
Saint Joseph's:		65–28	30–6		
Total:		158–118			
National champion Postseason invitational champion Conference regular season champion Conference regular season and conference tournament champion Division regular season champion Division regular season and conference tournament champion Conference tournament champion

=== NBA ===
Legend
Regular season	G	Games coached	W	Games won	L	Games lost	W–L %	Win–loss %
Playoffs	PG	Playoff games	PW	Playoff wins	PL	Playoff losses	PW–L %	Playoff win–loss %

Team	Year	G	W	L	W–L%	Finish	PG	PW	PL	PW–L%	Result
San Diego	1983–84	82	30	52	.366	6th in Pacific	—	—	—	—	Missed Playoffs
LA Clippers	1984–85	61	22	39	.361	(fired)	—	—	—	—	—
Philadelphia	1987–88	39	16	23	.410	4th in Atlantic	—	—	—	—	Missed Playoffs
Philadelphia	1988–89	82	46	36	.561	2nd in Atlantic	3	0	3	.000	Lost in first round
Philadelphia	1989–90	82	53	29	.646	1st in Atlantic	10	4	6	.400	Lost in Conf. Semifinals
Philadelphia	1990–91	82	44	38	.537	2nd in Atlantic	8	4	4	.500	Lost in Conf. Semifinals
Philadelphia	1991–92	82	35	47	.427	5th in Atlantic	—	—	—	—	Missed Playoffs
Washington	1994–95	82	21	61	.256	7th in Atlantic	—	—	—	—	Missed Playoffs
Washington	1995–96	82	39	43	.476	4th in Atlantic	—	—	—	—	Missed Playoffs
Washington	1996–97	46	22	24	.478	(fired)	—	—	—	—	—
Career		720	328	392	.456		21	8	13	.381	
