= 1980–81 Cornell Big Red men's basketball team =

American college basketball season

1980–81 Cornell Big Red men's basketball
- Conference: Ivy
- Record: 7–19 (4—10 Ivy)
- Head coach: Tom Miller (1st season)
- Home arena: Barton Hall

1980–81 Ivy League men's basketball standings
	Conf.				Overall
Team	W		L	PCT	W		L	PCT
Princeton	13	–	1	.929	18	–	10	.643
Penn	13	–	1	.929	20	–	8	.714
Harvard	9	–	5	.643	16	–	10	.615
Brown	5	–	9	.357	9	–	17	.346
Columbia	5	–	9	.357	9	–	17	.346
Cornell	4	–	10	.286	7	–	19	.269
Yale	4	–	10	.286	7	–	19	.269
Dartmouth	3	–	11	.214	10	–	16	.385
Rankings from AP Poll

The 1980–81 Cornell Big Red men's basketball team represented Cornell University during the 1980–81 college men's basketball season. The team finished with a final record of 7–19, 4—10, and they finished 6th in the Ivy League. This was coach Tom Miller's first season at Cornell.

== Roster ==
1980–81 Cornell Big Red men's basketball team
Players
Coaches

Pos.	#	Name	Height	Weight	Year	Hometown
G	10	George Hall	6 ft 2 in (1.88 m)	—	Fr	Coram, New York
G	11	Bobby Macke	6 ft 1 in (1.85 m)	—	Fr	Appleton, Wisconsin
G/F	24	Phil Call	6 ft 4 in (1.93 m)	210 lb (95 kg)	Sr	Batavia, New York
G	25	Kevin McCarthy	6 ft 0 in (1.83 m)	—	Sr	Shorewood, Wisconsin
F	30	Mike Lucas	6 ft 7 in (2.01 m)	—	Jr	Detroit, Michigan

Head coach

- Tom Miller

Assistant coach(es)

- Dennis Doyle
- Ray Swetalla

Legend

- (C) Team captain
- (S) Suspended
- (I) Ineligible
- (W) Walk-on
- Injured
- Current redshirt

Roster

== Schedule ==
Date time, TV	Rank^{#}	Opponent^{#}	Result	Record	Site city, state
November 28*		at Clemson	L 64–82	0–1	Littlejohn Coliseum; Clemson, SC
November 29*		vs. Rice	L 51–69	0–2	Littlejohn Coliseum; Clemson, SC
December 5*		at Northwestern	L 48–63	0–3	Welsh–Ryan Arena; Evanston, Illinois
December 8*		at Bowling Green State	L 47–61	0–4	Anderson Arena; Bowling Green, Ohio
December 11*		Saint Joseph's	L 39–42	0–5	Barton Hall; Ithaca, NY
December 28*		Hofstra	W 63–61	1–5	Barton Hall; Ithaca, NY
December 30*		vs. SMU	L 42–67	1–6	Riverfront Coliseum; Cincinnati, Ohio
January 2*		Niagara	L 66–72	1–7	Barton Hall; Ithaca, NY
January 5*		at Colgate	L 72–74	1–8	Cotterell Court; Hamilton, NY
January 7*		Canisius	W 55–53	2–8	Barton Hall; Ithaca, NY
January 10*		Rochester	W 64–56	3–8	Barton Hall; Ithaca, NY
January 16		Columbia	W 75–64	4–8 (1–0)	Barton Hall; Ithaca, NY
January 23		at Columbia	L 45–46	4–9 (1–1)	Levien Gymnasium; New York
January 27*		at Notre Dame	L 58–80	4–10 (1–1)	Joyce Center; Notre Dame, IN
January 30		at Dartmouth	W 66–58	5–10 (2–1)	Alumni Gymnasium; Hanover, NH
January 31		at Harvard	L 69–71	5–11 (2–2)	Malkin Athletic Center; Cambridge, Massachusetts
February 6		Princeton	L 44–46	5–12 (2–3)	Barton Hall; Ithaca, NY
February 7		Penn	L 49–61	5–13 (2–4)	Barton Hall; Ithaca, NY
February 13		at Brown	L 42–43	5–14 (2–5)	Marvel Gymnasium; Providence, RI
February 14		at Yale	L 47–58	5–15 (2–6)	Payne Whitney Gymnasium; New Haven, CT
February 20		Dartmouth	W 60–56	6–15 (3–6)	Barton Hall; Ithaca, NY
February 21		Harvard	L 65–73	6–16 (3–7)	Barton Hall; Ithaca, NY
February 27		Yale	L 65–68	6–17 (3–8)	Barton Hall; Ithaca, NY
February 28		Brown	W 69–52	7–17 (4–8)	Barton Hall; Ithaca, NY
March 6		at Penn	L 56–68	7–18 (4–9)	Palestra; Philadelphia, PA
March 7		at Princeton	L 42–52	7–19 (4–10)	Jadwin Gymnasium; Princeton, NJ
*Non-conference game. ^{#}Rankings from AP Poll. (#) Tournament seedings in parentheses.
