= 1981 East Coast Conference (Division I) men's basketball tournament =

Basketball Tournament

- Classification: Division I
- Season: 1980–81
- Teams: 12
- First round site: Home Courts
- Quarterfinals site: Home Courts
- Semifinals site: Palestra; Philadelphia, PA
- Finals site: Palestra; Philadelphia, PA
- Champions: Saint Joseph's (1st title)
- Winning coach: Jim Lynam (1st title)

1980–81 ECC men's basketball standings
	Conf.				Overall
Team	W		L	PCT	W		L	PCT
East
American	11	–	0	1.000	24	–	6	.800
Saint Joseph's †	9	–	2	.818	25	–	8	.758
Temple	9	–	2	.818	20	–	8	.714
La Salle	8	–	3	.727	14	–	13	.519
Drexel	6	–	5	.545	14	–	13	.519
Hofstra	5	–	6	.455	12	–	15	.444
West
Lafayette	8	–	8	.500	15	–	13	.536
Rider	8	–	8	.500	14	–	14	.500
Bucknell	6	–	10	.375	12	–	16	.429
Lehigh	6	–	10	.375	14	–	12	.538
Delaware	3	–	13	.188	6	–	19	.240
West Chester	2	–	14	.125	7	–	20	.259
† 1981 ECC tournament winner Rankings from AP poll

The 1981 East Coast Conference men's basketball tournament was held March 5–8, 1981. The champion gained and an automatic berth to the NCAA tournament.

== Bracket and results ==
First round Friday, March 5
4E	La Salle	66
5E	Drexel	69
3W	Bucknell	79
6W	West Chester	66
4W	Lehigh	66
5W	Delaware	60
3E	Temple	68
6E	Hofstra	63

Quarterfinals; Saturday, March 6
1E	American	62
5E	Drexel	60
2W	Rider	68
3W	Bucknell	50
1W	Lafayette	74
4W	Lehigh	58
2E	Saint Joseph's	60
3E	Temple	55

Semifinals; Sunday, March 7
1E	American	99
2W	Rider	80
1W	Lafayette	63
2E	Saint Joseph's	73

Championship; Monday, March 8
1E	American	60
2E	Saint Joseph's	63

* denotes overtime game
