= Tom Miller (basketball) =

American former basketball coach (born 1948)

Biographical details
- Born: November 1, 1948 (age 77)

Playing career
- 1968–1970: Army
- Position: Forward

Coaching career (HC unless noted)
- 1975–1980: Indiana (assistant)
- 1980–1986: Cornell
- 1986–1990: Colorado
- 1990–1993: Army

Head coaching record
- Overall: 119–225

Thomas E. Miller (born November 7, 1948) is an American former basketball coach. He served as the head men's basketball at Cornell University from 1980 to 1986, the University of Colorado Boulder from 1986 to 1990, and the United States Military Academy from 1990 to 1993, compiling a career college basketball coaching record of 119–225.

== Head coaching record ==
Record table
Season	Team	Overall	Conference	Standing	Postseason
Cornell Big Red (Ivy League) (1980–1986)
1980–81	Cornell	7–19	4–10	T–6th	
1981–82	Cornell	10–16	7–7	T–4th	
1982–83	Cornell	10–16	6–8	T–5th	
1983–84	Cornell	16–10	9–5	T–2nd	
1984–85	Cornell	14–12	8–6	3rd	
1985–86	Cornell	14–12	9–5	T–2nd	
Cornell:		71–85	43–41		
Colorado Buffaloes (Big Eight Conference) (1986–1990)
1986–87	Colorado	9–19	3–11	8th	
1987–88	Colorado	7–21	3–11	8th	
1988–89	Colorado	7–21	2–12	8th	
1989–90	Colorado	12–18	2–12	8th	
Colorado:		37–79	10–46		
Army Cadets (Patriot League) (1990–1993)
1990–91	Army	6–22	3–9	5th	
1991–92	Army	4–24	2–12	7th	
1992–93	Army	3–15	2–6		
Army:		13–61	7–27		
Total:		119–225			
