= 1980–81 Princeton Tigers men's basketball team =

American college basketball season

1980–81 Princeton Tigers men's basketball

Ivy League Champion

Ivy League one-game playoff, won 1981 NCAA Men's Division I Basketball Tournament, First round
- Conference: Ivy League
- Record: 18–10 (14–1, 1st Ivy)
- Head coach: Pete Carril (14th season)
- Captains: David Blatt; Randy Melville
- Home arena: Jadwin Gymnasium

1980–81 Ivy League men's basketball standings
	Conf.				Overall
Team	W		L	PCT	W		L	PCT
Princeton	13	–	1	.929	18	–	10	.643
Penn	13	–	1	.929	20	–	8	.714
Harvard	9	–	5	.643	16	–	10	.615
Brown	5	–	9	.357	9	–	17	.346
Columbia	5	–	9	.357	9	–	17	.346
Cornell	4	–	10	.286	7	–	19	.269
Yale	4	–	10	.286	7	–	19	.269
Dartmouth	3	–	11	.214	10	–	16	.385
Rankings from AP Poll

The 1980–81 Princeton Tigers men's basketball team represented Princeton University in intercollegiate college basketball during the 1980–81 NCAA Division I men's basketball season. The head coach was Pete Carril and the team co-captains were David Blatt and Randy Melville. The team played its home games in the Jadwin Gymnasium on the university campus in Princeton, New Jersey. The team was the champion of the Ivy League, which earned them an invitation to the 48-team 1981 NCAA Men's Division I Basketball Tournament.

The team posted an 18–10 overall record and a 14–1 conference record. The team's only conference loss came on February 24, 1981, against the Penn Quakers at The Palestra in Philadelphia, Pennsylvania, by a 52–43 margin. The team won its March 10, 1981, one-game Ivy League playoff game against Penn at the Kirby Sports Center at Lafayette College in Easton, Pennsylvania, by a 54–40 margin for the Ivy League Championship and an invitation to the NCAA Men's Division I Basketball Tournament. The team lost its March 12, 1981 NCAA Men's Division I Basketball Tournament East Regional first-round game against the BYU Cougars 60–51 at the Providence Civic Center in Providence, Rhode Island.

The team was led by first team All-Ivy League selection Melville. Melville tied Michael Steurer's Ivy League single-game record set on February 6, 1976, with eight steals against the Colgate Raiders on December 21, 1980, which was a record that would stand until March 5, 1983. Steurer and Melville continue to share the Princeton single game record. The team achieved a 54.9% field goal percentage in conference games, which is the current Ivy League single-season record.

== Regular season ==
The team posted a 18–10 (14–1 Ivy League) record.

11/29 Oral Roberts	L	61-66
12/2 Rutgers	L	47-57
12/6 (16) St. John's	W	47-46
12/9 ST. JOSEPH'S	L	*50-51
12/13 MANHATTAN	W	58-49
12/21 COLGATE	W	75-42
12/23 Ohio State	L	46-72
12/27 Rhode Island !	L	58-62
12/28 Northwestern !	L	*68-72
12/29 CS Fullerton !	W	60-57
1/3 SETON HALL	L	51-53
1/9 Brown	W	44-41
1/10 Yale	W	66-50
1/12 FORDHAM	L	***50-53
1/31 PENNSYLVANIA	W	62-61
2/6 Cornell	W	46-44
2/7 Columbia	W	40-35
2/13 DARTMOUTH	W	55-44
2/14 HARVARD	W	72-48
2/20 YALE	W	60-47
2/21 BROWN	W	40-33
2/24 Pennsylvania	L	43-52
2/27 Harvard	W	*56-54
2/28 Dartmouth	W	60-46
3/6 COLUMBIA	W	75-57
3/7 CORNELL	W	*52-46
3/10 Pennsylvania @	W	54-40
3/12 (18) vs. BYU #	L	51-60

! = Far West Classic at Portland (Ore.) Mem'l Coliseum
@ = Ivy League playoff at Lafayette
# = NCAA first round at Providence (R.I.) Civic Ctr.
