= Alumni Gymnasium (Dartmouth College) =

Gymnasium in Hanover, New Hampshire

Coordinates: 43°42′10″N 72°17′04″W

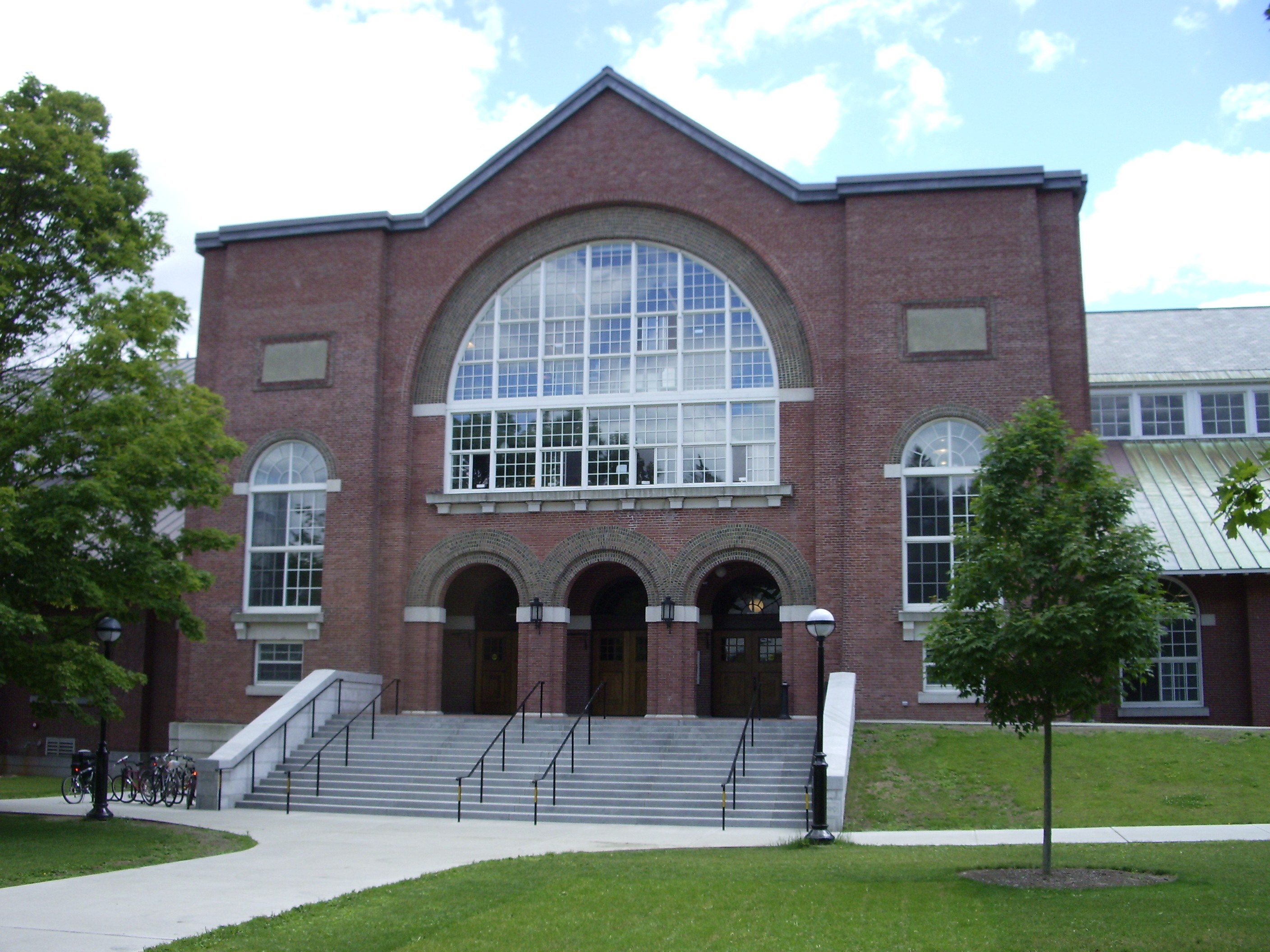
Alumni Gymnasium

Dartmouth College's Lewinstein Athletic Center (formerly Alumni Gymnasium), located in Hanover, New Hampshire, in the United States, is the center of Dartmouth College's athletic life and hosts venues for many of Dartmouth's 34 varsity sports. The gymnasium contains two swimming pools, intramural basketball courts, championship basketball courts, two weight rooms, squash courts, 1/13 of a mile jogging track, two saunas, fencing lanes, and a rowing tank for crew training.

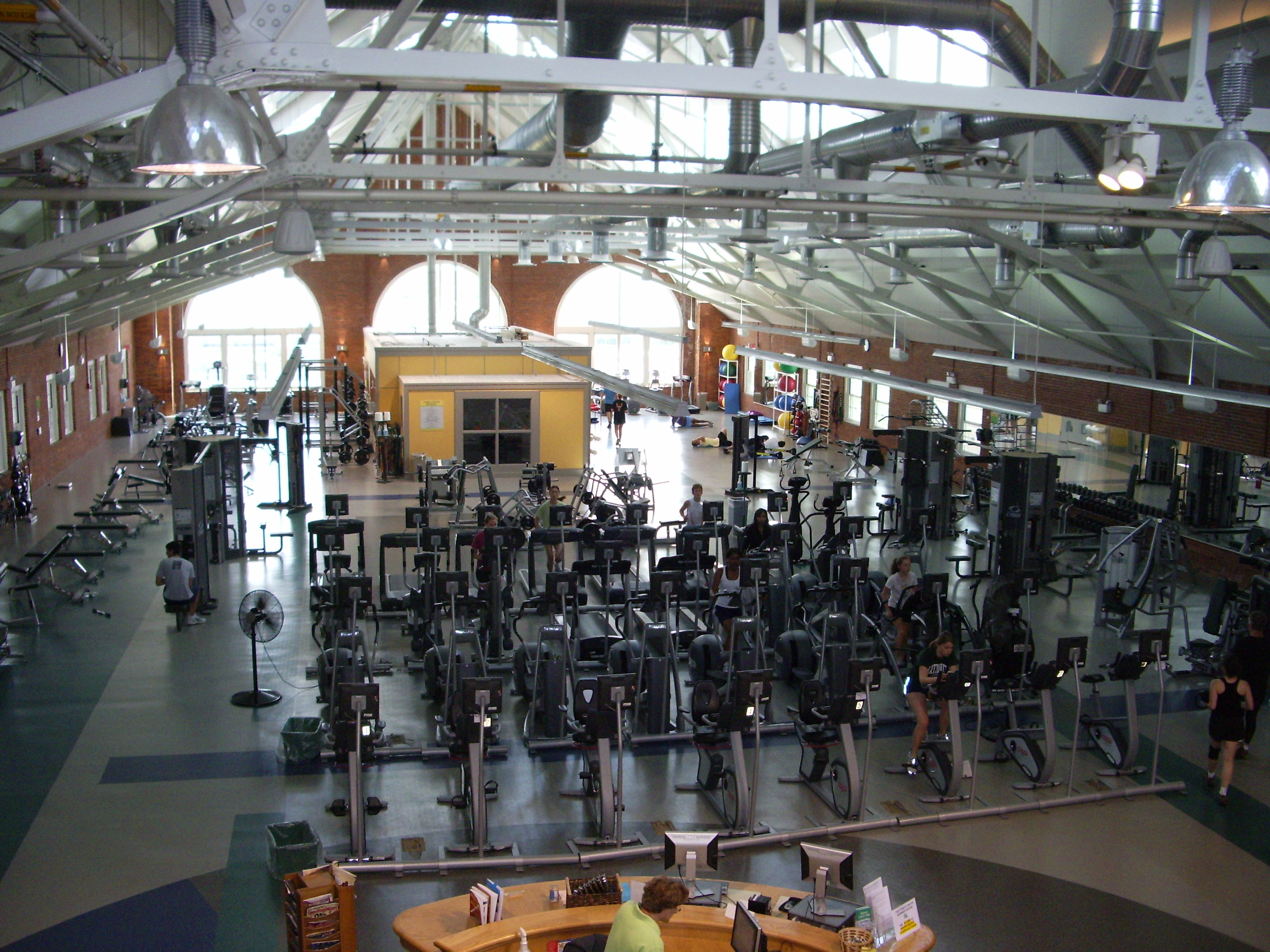
The Fitness Center as viewed from the mezzanine

Lewinstein Athletic Center was designed by Charles Rich and Fredrick Mathesius. Construction began in 1909 under College President Ernest Fox Nichols. The cornerstone of the gymnasium contains several historical objects, including a file of the "New Gymnasium News", copies of the student newspaper The Dartmouth, the Dartmouth humor magazine the Dartmouth Jack-O-Lantern, and the yearbook, the Aegis. The building cost approximately $190,000. In 1938, engineers from the Thayer School of Engineering constructed a springy board track of Canadian spruce around the inside of the gym which was used by Glenn Cunningham to break the American mile record that year. The record was disallowed because Cunningham had been aided by pacing runners.

During World War I, the gymnasium was converted into barracks, and during World War II, was used as an armory and lounge. In 1962–1963, the gym was extensively remodeled to include a new basketball court and added to the Dartmouth College aquatic facilities with the addition of the Karl B. Michael Pool. In 1972, the year the college went coed, a two-story women's locker room was added to the southeast corner.

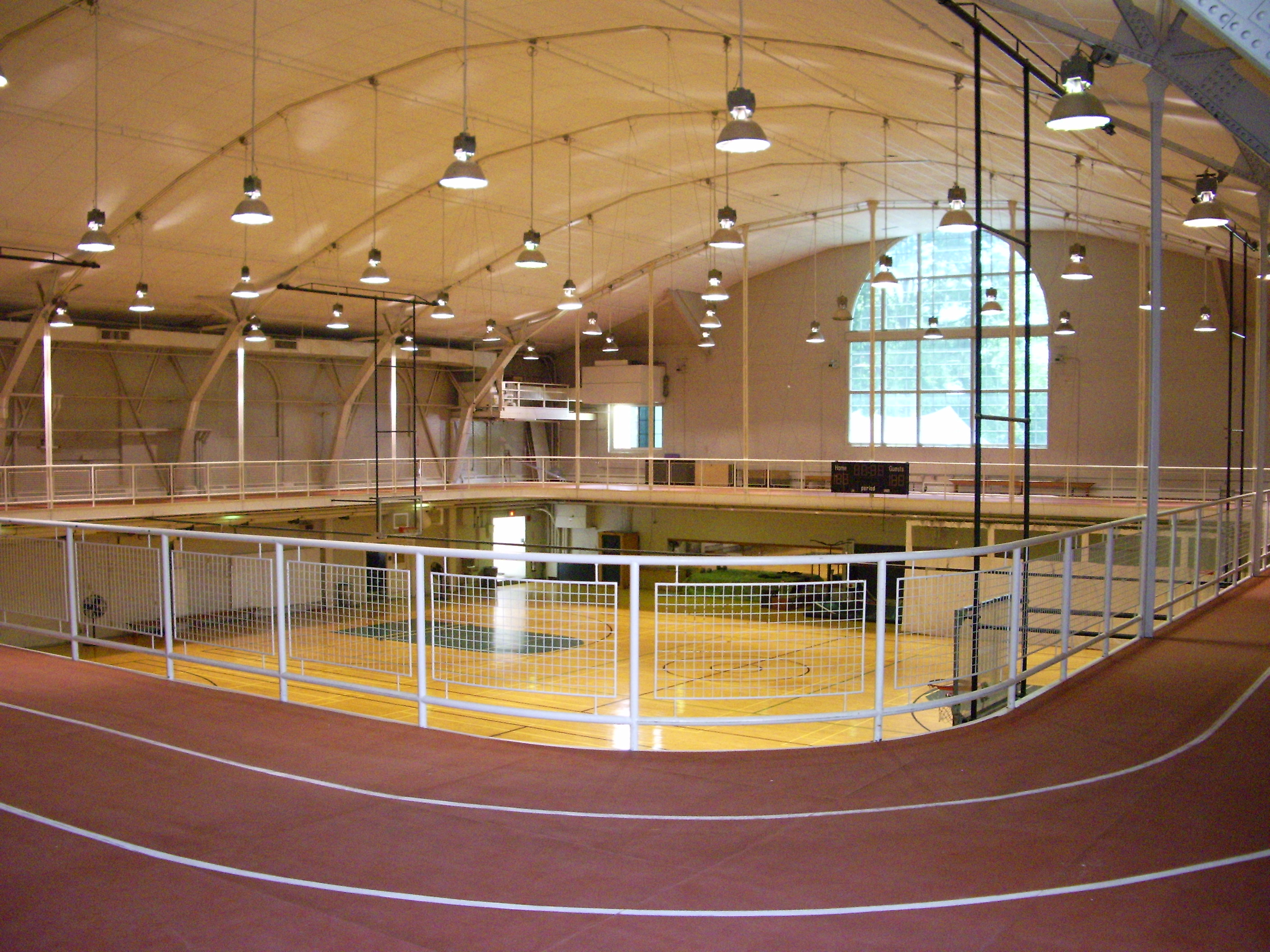
Basketball courts and the indoor track

Lewinstein Athletic Center completed a $12 million renovation in the spring of 2006. As part of the renovation efforts, Lewinstein Athletic Center now features a 14,000-square-foot (1,300 m^{2}) fitness center built into the second floor, 8 new multi-purpose fitness rooms that together add roughly 10,000 square feet (930 m^{2}) of new usable space, structural enhancements to the Karl Michael Pool, new entrances, an elevator servicing all floors of the gym, and handicap accessible upgrades.
